= 1982 Newfoundland general election =

Canadian provincial election

- April 6, 1982

52 seats to the 39th General Assembly of Newfoundland 27 seats needed for a majority
- Turnout: 77.5% (▲3.9% pp)
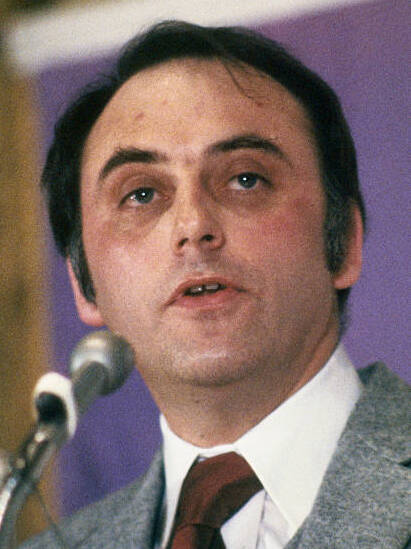
	First party	Second party
		LIB
Leader	Brian Peckford	Len Stirling
Party	Progressive Conservative	Liberal
Leader since	March 26, 1979	1980
Leader's seat	Green Bay	Bonavista North (lost re-election)
Last election	33 seats, 50.25%	19 seats, 40.46%
Seats won	44	8
Seat change	▲11	▼11
Popular vote	152,966	87,228
Percentage	61.19%	34.89%
Swing	▲10.94pp	▼5.57pp
Premier before election
Brian Peckford
Progressive Conservative
Premier after election
Brian Peckford
Progressive Conservative

The 1982 Newfoundland general election was held on 6 April 1982 to elect members of the 39th General Assembly of Newfoundland. It was won by the Progressive Conservative party.

== Results ==
Party	Leader	1979	Seats won	% change	Popular vote	(%)
Progressive Conservative	Brian Peckford	33	44	+33%	152,966	61.2%
Liberal	Len Stirling	19	8	-58%	87,228	34.9%
New Democratic	Peter Fenwick	0	0	0%	9,371	3.7%
Other		0	0	0%	425	0.2%
Totals		52	52	-	251,024	100%

== Results by district ==
- Names in **boldface type** represent party leaders.
- † indicates that the incumbent did not run again.

=== St. John's ===
Electoral district	Candidates			Incumbent
Electoral district	PC	Liberal	NDP	Incumbent
Kilbride; 76.66% turnout	Robert Aylward; 4,710; 81.45%	Sean Callahan; 1,073; 18.55%		Robert Aylward
Pleasantville; 78.23% turnout	Jerome Dinn; 4,803; 68.97%	Walter Noel; 1,349; 19.37%	Gerry Panting; 812; 11.66%	Jerome Dinn
St. John's Centre; 72.80% turnout	Patrick McNicholas; 2,357; 71.27%	John Slattery; 657; 19.87%	Robert Harry Cuff; 293; 8.86%	Patrick McNicholas
St. John's East; 63.09% turnout	William Marshall; 2,021; 68.53%	Hugh Coady; 382; 12.95%	Nancy Riche; 546; 18.52%	William Marshall
St. John's North; 75.05% turnout	John Carter; 2,520; 66.67%	Norman Whalen; 1,095; 28.97%	Austin Scott; 165; 4.36%	John Carter
St. John's South; 64.30% turnout	John Collins; 2,286; 73.67%	Ernest Antle; 582; 18.76%	Barbara Roberts; 235; 7.57%	John Collins
St. John's West; 64.92% turnout	Harold Barrett; 2,475; 71.64%	Ronald Pumphrey; 755; 21.85%	Ronald Lewis; 225; 6.51%	Harold Barrett
Waterford-Kenmount; 81.21% turnout	Gerry Ottenheimer; 5,063; 72.33%	William Callahan; 1,427; 20.39%	John March; 510; 7.28%	Gerry Ottenheimer

=== St. John's suburbs ===
Electoral district	Candidates				Incumbent
Electoral district	PC	Liberal	NDP	Other	Incumbent
Conception Bay South; 75.76% turnout	John Butt; 5,382; 70.56%	Gerald Greenslade; 1,664; 21.81%	Howard Story; 292; 3.83%	Jerry LeDrew (Independent); 290; 3.80%	John Butt
Mount Pearl; 82.14% turnout	Neil Windsor; 5,196; 75.46%	Seymour Dyke; 928; 13.48%	Helen Porter; 762; 11.06%		Neil Windsor
Mount Scio; 77.04% turnout	Leo Barry; 3,997; 77.43%	Sonya Abbott; 785; 15.21%	Raymond Ryall; 380; 7.36%		Leo Barry
St. John's East Extern; 80.88% turnout	Tom Hickey; 4,795; 72.64%	David Wheeler; 1,338; 20.27%	Robert Anderson; 468; 7.09%		Tom Hickey

=== Avalon Peninsula ===
Electoral district	Candidates			Incumbent
Electoral district	PC	Liberal	Other	Incumbent
Carbonear; 85.94% turnout	Milton Peach; 3,319; 54.31%	Rod Moores; 2,792; 45.69%		Rod Moores
Ferryland; 84.89% turnout	Charlie Power; 3,374; 79.84%	John Wiseman; 852; 20.16%		Charlie Power
Harbour Grace; 86.08% turnout	Haig Young; 3,394; 70.15%	Carl Cooper; 1,444; 29.85%		Haig Young
Harbour Main-Bell Island; 81.67% turnout	Norman Doyle; 4,238; 77.24%	Joe Furey; 1,077; 19.63%	Bill Healey (NDP); 172; 3.13%	Norman Doyle
Placentia; 79.42% turnout	William Patterson; 2,706; 64.20%	Basil Power; 1,509; 35.80%		William Patterson
Port de Grave; 81.80% turnout	Randy W. Collins; 3,003; 51.82%	Ambrose Stoyles; 2,657; 45.85%	James Roberts (Independent); 135; 2.33%	Randy W. Collins
St. Mary's-The Capes; 94.15% turnout	Loyola Hearn; 2,619; 56.55%	Derrick Hancock; 2,012; 43.45%		Derrick Hancock
Trinity-Bay de Verde; 84.02% turnout	James Reid; 2,700; 56.40%	Phil Warren; 2,087; 43.60%		Frederick B. Rowe†

=== Eastern Newfoundland ===
Electoral district	Candidates		Incumbent
Electoral district	PC	Liberal	Incumbent
Bellevue; 79.19% turnout	Basil Jamieson; 2,858; 48.90%	Wilson Callan; 2,987; 51.10%	Wilson Callan
Bonavista North; 86.71% turnout	George Cross; 2,972; 52.60%	**Len Stirling**; 2,678; 47.40%	**Len Stirling**
Bonavista South; 64.93% turnout	Jim Morgan; 2,742; 73.43%	Cyril Mifflin; 992; 26.57%	Jim Morgan
Fogo; 83.83% turnout	Manson Sheppard; 2,438; 47.41%	Beaton Tulk; 2,704; 52.59%	Beaton Tulk
Terra Nova; 76.18% turnout	Glen Greening; 2,256; 47.89%	Tom Lush; 2,455; 52.11%	Tom Lush
Trinity North; 77.33% turnout	Charlie Brett; 3,022; 59.50%	Fred Best; 2,057; 40.50%	Charlie Brett

=== Central Newfoundland ===
Electoral district	Candidates			Incumbent
Electoral district	PC	Liberal	NDP	Incumbent
Baie Verte-White Bay; 80.53% turnout	Tom Rideout; 3,062; 56.06%	Chris Decker; 2,400; 43.94%		Tom Rideout
Exploits; 59.51% turnout	Hugh Twomey; 2,787; 61.75%	Glenn Noseworthy; 1,726; 38.25%		Hugh Twomey
Gander; 74.76% turnout	Hazel Newhook; 2,876; 57.75%	Winston Baker; 1,845; 37.05%	Lowell Paulson; 259; 5.20%	Hazel Newhook
Grand Falls; 74.13% turnout	Len Simms; 2,786; 70.73%	Walter Clarke; 1,153; 29.27%		Len Simms
Green Bay; 70.56% turnout	**Brian Peckford**; 3,338; 78.36%	Munden Batstone; 922; 21.64%		**Brian Peckford**
Lewisporte; 78.05% turnout	James Russell; 3,559; 63.37%	Graham Wood; 2,057; 36.63%		Freeman White†
Twillingate; 73.65% turnout	Ida Reid; 1,880; 49.69%	Bill Rowe; 1,588; 41.98%	Roderick Woolridge; 315; 8.33%	Bill Rowe
Windsor-Buchans; 73.97% turnout	John McLennon; 2,057; 51.05%	Graham Flight; 1,972; 48.95%		Graham Flight

=== Southern Newfoundland ===
Electoral district	Candidates			Incumbent
Electoral district	PC	Liberal	NDP	Incumbent
Burgeo-Bay d'Espoir; 81.21% turnout	Harold Andrews; 2,221; 55.14%	Lloyd Walters; 1,807; 44.86%		Harold Andrews
Burin-Placentia West; 90.66% turnout	Glenn Tobin; 3,429; 52.02%	Don Hollett; 3,163; 47.98%		Don Hollett
Fortune-Hermitage; 71.10% turnout	Don Stewart; 2,446; 61.47%	John Rideout; 1,533; 38.53%		Don Stewart
Grand Bank; 77.41% turnout	Bill Matthews; 2,857; 51.64%	Leslie Thoms; 2,442; 44.13%	Eric Miller; 234; 4.23%	Leslie Thoms
La Poile; 68.02% turnout	David Martin; 2,051; 49.51%	Steve Neary; 2,092; 50.49%		Steve Neary

=== Western Newfoundland ===
Electoral district	Candidates			Incumbent
Electoral district	PC	Liberal	NDP	Incumbent
Bay of Islands; 74.06% turnout	Luke Woodrow; 3,254; 65.40%	Elizabeth Hann; 1,377; 27.67%	Clarence Galliott; 345; 6.93%	Luke Woodrow
Humber East; 76.96% turnout	Lynn Verge; 3,102; 66.82%	Paul Dicks; 1,249; 26.91%	Cynthia Wishart; 291; 6.27%	Lynn Verge
Humber Valley; 76.54% turnout	Wallace House; 3,480; 63.53%	Kevin Saunders; 1,998; 36.47%		Wallace House
Humber West; 81.33% turnout	Ray Baird; 3,365; 63.97%	Doyle Mills; 1,130; 21.48%	**Peter Fenwick**; 765; 14.55%	Ray Baird
Port au Port; 89.86% turnout	Don Bennett; 1,798; 44.69%	Jim Hodder; 2,094; 52.05%	Jenny Fenwick; 131; 3.26%	Jim Hodder
St. Barbe; 79.41% turnout	Everett Osmond; 2,611; 50.38%	Trevor Bennett; 2,166; 41.79%	Donald Snook; 406; 7.83%	Trevor Bennett
St. George's; 80.17% turnout	Ron Dawe; 2,910; 63.75%	Charles Mercer; 1,655; 36.25%		Ron Dawe
Stephenville; 75.31% turnout	Frederick Stagg; 2,205; 56.21%	William MacNeil; 1,718; 43.79%		Frederick Stagg
Strait of Belle Isle; 72.66% turnout	Frank Kearney; 1,318; 28.54%	Edward Roberts; 2,975; 64.42%	Levi Squires; 325; 7.04%	Edward Roberts

=== Labrador ===
Electoral district	Candidates			Incumbent
Electoral district	PC	Liberal	NDP	Incumbent
Eagle River; 88.25% turnout	Philip Stone; 527; 21.86%	Eugene Hiscock; 1,316; 54.58%	Ronald Rumbolt; 568; 23.56%	Eugene Hiscock
Menihek; 82.91% turnout	Peter Walsh; 3,589; 58.86%	Gordon Manstan; 1,637; 26.84%	Roland LeGrow; 872; 14.30%	Peter Walsh
Naskaupi; 83.98% turnout	Joseph Goudie; 1,998; 50.61%	Melvin Woodward; 1,950; 49.39%		Joseph Goudie
Torngat Mountains; 99.06% turnout	David Hunt; 214; 18.79%	Garfield Warren; 925; 81.21%		Garfield Warren
