= 1972 Newfoundland general election =

Canadian provincial election

- March 24, 1972

42 seats to the 36th General Assembly of Newfoundland 22 seats needed for a majority
- Turnout: 79.1% (▼8.8% pp)
	First party	Second party
	PC	LIB
Leader	Frank Moores	Edward Roberts
Party	Progressive Conservative	Liberal
Leader since	1972	1972
Leader's seat	Humber West	White Bay North
Last election	21 seats, 51.34%	20 seats, 44.48%
Seats won	33	9
Seat change	▲12	▼11
Popular vote	126,508	77,849
Percentage	60.22%	37.06%
Swing	▲8.88pp	▼7.42pp
Premier before election
Frank Moores
Progressive Conservative
Premier after election
Frank Moores
Progressive Conservative

The 1972 Newfoundland general election was held on 24 March 1972 to elect members of the 36th General Assembly of Newfoundland. It was won by the Progressive Conservative party. In the district of Labrador South, the election was a virtual tie between two candidates and had to be declared void. In a subsequent by-election, the seat was taken by a member of the Labrador Party.

== Results ==
Party	Leader	1971	Seats won	% change	Popular vote	(%)
Progressive Conservative	Frank Moores	21	33	+57%	126,508	60.5%
Liberal	Edward Roberts	20	9	-55%	77,849	37.1%
Labrador		1	0	-100%	2,548	1.21
New Democratic	John Connors	0	0	0%	410	0.2%
Other		0	0	0%	1,759	0.99%
Totals		42	42	-	210,078	100%

== Results by district ==
- Names in **boldface type** represent party leaders.
- † indicates that the incumbent did not run again.
- § indicates that the incumbent was defeated for nomination.
- ‡ indicates that the incumbent ran in a different district.

=== St. John's ===
Electoral district	Candidates		Incumbent
Electoral district	PC	Liberal	Incumbent
St. John's Centre; 73.61% turnout	Anthony Murphy; 3,580; 76.46%	Denis Murphy; 1,102; 23.54%	Anthony Murphy
St. John's East; 71.83% turnout	William Marshall; 2,712; 77.51%	Brendan Kelly; 787; 22.49%	William Marshall
St. John's East Extern; 73.02% turnout	Tom Hickey; 8,039; 78.92%	Austin Ryan; 2,147; 21.08%	Tom Hickey
St. John's North; 81.53% turnout	John Carter; 9,512; 69.29%	Roston Churchill; 4,216; 30.71%	John Carter
St. John's South; 78.43% turnout	Robert Wells; 5,997; 77.64%	Rod Moores; 1,727; 22.36%	Hugh Shea§‡ (ran in Harbour Main)
St. John's West; 75.59% turnout	John Crosbie; 5,949; 72.92%	Duncan Sharpe; 2,209; 27.08%	John Crosbie

=== Conception Bay ===
Electoral district	Candidates			Incumbent
Electoral district	PC	Liberal	Other	Incumbent
Bay de Verde; 75.22% turnout	Brendan Howard; 1,536; 61.66%	Donald Burt; 955; 38.34%		Vacant (Note: William Penman Saunders had been elected in 1971, but he resigned his seat on February 28, 1972.)
Bell Island; 84.24% turnout	Bren Fitzpatrick; 973; 42.25%	Steve Neary; 1,175; 51.02%	Edward Russell (Independent); 155; 6.73%	Steve Neary
Carbonear; 84.85% turnout	Augustus Rowe; 2,020; 59.10%	Walter Milley; 1,398; 40.90%		Augustus Rowe
Harbour Grace; 86.25% turnout	Haig Young; 2,569; 55.69%	Hubert Kitchen; 2,005; 43.46%	George Snow (Independent); 39; 0.85%	Hubert Kitchen
Harbour Main	Gordon Dawe; 5,181; 40.09%	Richard Gosse; 1,651; 12.77%	Hugh Shea (Independent Liberal); 1,140; 8.82%	Gordon Dawe
Harbour Main	William Doody; 4,953; 38.32%	Richard Gosse; 1,651; 12.77%	Hugh Shea (Independent Liberal); 1,140; 8.82%	William Doody
Port de Grave; 82.17% turnout	George Wilson; 2,270; 53.56%	James Hussey; 1,968; 46.44%		James Hussey

=== Avalon Peninsula ===
Electoral district	Candidates		Incumbent
Electoral district	PC	Liberal	Incumbent
Ferryland; 82.66% turnout	Thomas Doyle; 2,402; 65.57%	Kevin O'Regan; 1,261; 34.43%	Tom Doyle
Placentia East; 85.83% turnout	Fintan Aylward; 2,688; 54.99%	Michael Maher; 2,200; 45.01%	Joey Smallwood†
St. Mary's; 88.82% turnout	Gerry Ottenheimer; 1,705; 72.28%	Dermott Lee; 654; 27.72%	Gerry Ottenheimer
Trinity South; 78.43% turnout	James Reid; 2,960; 53.39%	Rupert Bartlett; 2,584; 46.61%	Rupert Bartlett

=== Eastern Newfoundland ===
Electoral district	Candidates			Incumbent
Electoral district	PC	Liberal	Other	Incumbent
Bonavista North; 82.80% turnout	John Curran; 2,848; 45.98%	Paul Thoms; 3,346; 54.02%		Paul Thoms
Bonavista South; 75.81% turnout	Jim Morgan; 3,285; 56.74%	Rossy Barbour; 2,386; 41.21%	Ben Elliott (Independent Liberal); 119; 2.05%	Rossy Barbour
Fogo; 73.51% turnout	Ernest Roebotham; 1,727; 38.79%	Earl Winsor; 2,511; 56.40%	Barton Manning (Independent); 214; 4.81%	Earl Winsor
Trinity North; 76.23% turnout	Charlie Brett; 3,124; 52.77%	Uriah Strickland; 2,796; 47.23%		Uriah Strickland

=== Central Newfoundland ===
Electoral district	Candidates				Incumbent
Electoral district	PC	Liberal	NDP	Other	Incumbent
Gander; 77.59% turnout	Harold Collins; 4,674; 65.62%	Eli Baker; 2,272; 31.90%	Earle Boone; 177; 2.48%		Harold Collins
Grand Falls; 82.25% turnout	Aubrey Senior; 4,640; 57.18%	Wilburne England; 3,268; 40.28%	**John Connors**; 206; 2.54%		Aubrey Senior
Green Bay; 84.62% turnout	Brian Peckford; 2,560; 51.35%	Harold Starkes; 2,425; 48.65%			Harold Starkes
Lewisporte; 84.30% turnout	James Russell; 3,022; 57.82%	Clyde Mullett; 2,128; 40.71%		Walwin Blackmore (Independent); 77; 1.47%	James Russell
Twillingate; 80.58% turnout	John Loveridge; 1,490; 41.08%	Herbert Gillett; 2,110; 58.18%	Roderick Woolridge; 27; 0.74%		William Adams†
White Bay South; 84.03% turnout	William Eaton; 1,641; 42.95%	Bill Rowe; 2,180; 57.05%			Bill Rowe

=== Southern Newfoundland ===
Electoral district	Candidates			Incumbent
Electoral district	PC	Liberal	Other	Incumbent
Burgeo-La Poile; 75.78% turnout	Allan Evans; 3,062; 57.89%	Walter Hodder; 2,227; 42.11%		Allan Evans
Burin; 80.39% turnout	Alex Hickman; 3,803; 65.25%	Ronald Fagan; 2,025; 34.75%		Alex Hickman
Fortune Bay; 82.06% turnout	H.R.V. Earle; 1,563; 55.74%	Leslie Thoms; 1,226; 43.72%	Eric Hiscock (Independent); 15; 0.53%	Vacant (Note: Augustus Oldford had been elected in 1971, but he resigned his seat on January 21, 1972.)
Hermitage; 81.71% turnout	Roy Cheeseman; 2,183; 62.26%	Harold Piercey; 1,323; 37.74%		Harold Piercey
Placentia West; 84.17% turnout	Leo Barry; 1,858; 50.59%	Patrick Canning; 1,815; 49.41%		Patrick Canning

=== Western Newfoundland ===
Electoral district	Candidates		Incumbent
Electoral district	PC	Liberal	Incumbent
Humber East; 75.50% turnout	Tom Farrell; 5,290; 69.72%	Gerald Matthews; 2,297; 30.28%	Tom Farrell
Humber West	**Frank Moores**; Won by acclamation		**Frank Moores**
Port au Port; 84.74% turnout	Frederick Stagg; 4,107; 65.78%	James Campbell; 2,137; 34.22%	Frederick Stagg
St. Barbe North; 90.90% turnout	Wallace Maynard; 839; 37.56%	Frederick B. Rowe; 1,395; 62.44%	James Chalker†
St. Barbe South; 90.47% turnout	Edward Maynard; 2,107; 58.40%	Trevor Bennett; 1,501; 41.60%	Edward Maynard
St. George's; 82.80% turnout	Alexander Dunphy; 2,464; 65.46%	Ronald Callahan; 1,300; 34.54%	Alexander Dunphy
White Bay North; 79.26% turnout	Stanley Cole; 579; 16.17%	**Edward Roberts**; 3,002; 83.83%	**Edward Roberts**

=== Labrador ===
Electoral district	Candidates			Incumbent
Electoral district	PC	Liberal	Labrador	Incumbent
Labrador North; 90.62% turnout	Lloyd Janes; 1,102; 29.98%	Melvin Woodward; 1,396; 37.98%	Herbert Brett; 1,178; 32.04%	Melvin Woodward
Labrador South; 83.33% turnout (Note: The results were subsequently voided by the Supreme Court of Newfoundland and a by-election was held which was won by Martin.)		Joe Harvey; 933; 50.03%	Michael Martin; 932; 49.97%	Joe Harvey
Labrador West; 92.99% turnout	Joseph Rousseau; 3,494; 60.84%	Tom Burgess; 1,811; 31.53%	Gerald Neary; 438; 7.63%	Tom Burgess
