= 36th General Assembly of Newfoundland =

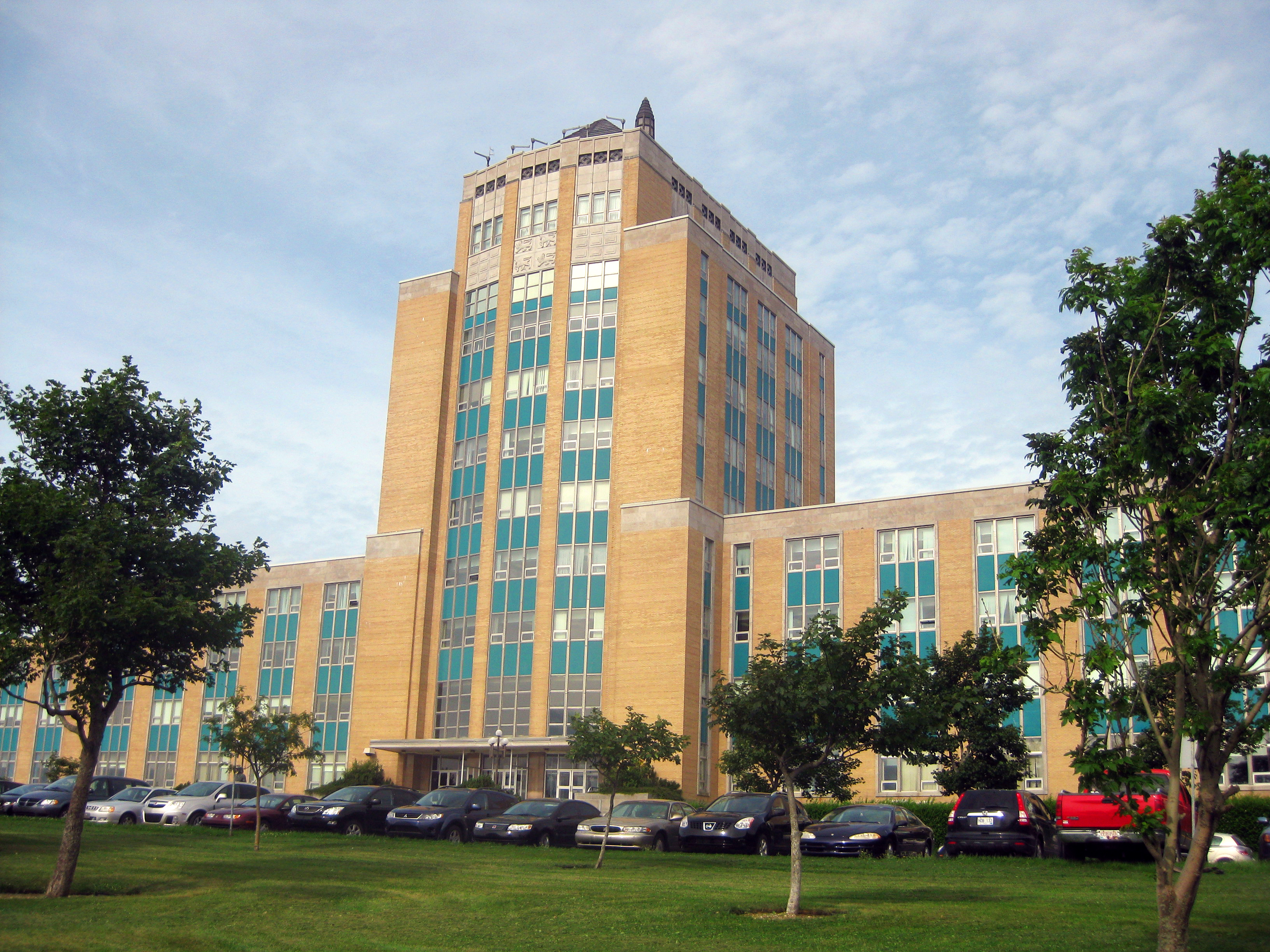
- Confederation Building East Block. Seat of the Newfoundland and Labrador government and the House of Assembly from 1960 to present.

History
- Founded: April 19, 1972
- Disbanded: August 25, 1975
- Preceded by: 35th General Assembly of Newfoundland
- Succeeded by: 37th General Assembly of Newfoundland

Leadership
- Premier: Frank Moores

Elections
- Last election: 1972 Newfoundland general election

The members of the 36th General Assembly of Newfoundland were elected in the Newfoundland general election held in March 1972. The general assembly sat from April 19, 1972, to August 25, 1975.

The Progressive Conservative Party led by Frank Moores formed the government.

James Russell served as speaker.

There were three sessions of the 36th General Assembly:

Session	Start	End
1st	April 19, 1972	November 27, 1972
2nd	January 31, 1973	February 26, 1975
3rd	February 26, 1975	June 25, 1975

Ewart John Arlington Harnum served as lieutenant governor of Newfoundland until 1974. Gordon Arnaud Winter succeeded Harnum as lieutenant-governor.

== Members of the Assembly ==
The following members were elected to the assembly in 1972:

Member	Electoral district	Party	First elected / previously elected
Brendan Howard	Bay de Verde	Progressive Conservative	1972
Stephen A. Neary	Bell Island	Liberal	1962
Paul S. Thoms	Bonavista North	Liberal	1971
James C. Morgan	Bonavista South	Progressive Conservative	1972
Allan Evans	Burgeo and La Poile	Progressive Conservative	1971
T. Alexander Hickman	Burin	Progressive Conservative	1966 (Note: First Elected as a Liberal)
Augustus T. Rowe	Carbonear	Progressive Conservative	1971
Thomas Doyle	Ferryland	Progressive Conservative	1971
Earl S. Winsor	Fogo	Liberal	1956
H.R.V. Earle	Fortune Bay	Progressive Conservative	1962, 1972
Harold Collins	Gander	Progressive Conservative	1967
Aubrey Senior	Grand Falls	Progressive Conservative	1971
A. Brian Peckford	Green Bay	Progressive Conservative	1972
Haig Young	Harbour Grace	Progressive Conservative	1972
Gordon Dawe	Harbour Main	Progressive Conservative	1971
William Doody	Harbour Main	Progressive Conservative	1971
Roy L. Cheeseman	Hermitage	Progressive Conservative	1972
Roger Simmons (1973)	Hermitage	Liberal	1973
Thomas C. Farrell	Humber East	Progressive Conservative	1971
Frank D. Moores (Note: Elected by acclamation)	Humber West	Progressive Conservative	1971
Melvin Woodward	Labrador North	Liberal	1971
Josiah Harvey	Labrador South	Liberal	1971
Michael S. Martin (1972)	Labrador South	New Labrador Party	1972
Joseph G. Rousseau	Labrador West	Progressive Conservative	1972
James Russell	Lewisporte	Progressive Conservative	1971
Fintan Aylward	Placentia East	Progressive Conservative	1972
Leo Barry	Placentia West	Progressive Conservative	1972
Frederick R. Stagg	Port au Port	Progressive Conservative	1971
George M. Wilson	Port de Grave	Progressive Conservative	1972
Frederick B. Rowe	St. Barbe North	Liberal	1972
Edward Maynard	St. Barbe South	Progressive Conservative	1971
Alexander Dunphy	St. George's	Progressive Conservative	1971
Anthony J. Murphy	St. John's Centre	Progressive Conservative	1962
William Marshall	St. John's East	Progressive Conservative	1970
Thomas V. Hickey	St. John's East Extern	Progressive Conservative	1966
John A. Carter	St. John's North	Progressive Conservative	1971
Robert Wells	St. John's South	Progressive Conservative	1972
John C. Crosbie	St. John's West	Progressive Conservative	1966
Gerry Ottenheimer	St. Mary's	Progressive Conservative	1966, (Note: St. John's East) 1971
Charles Brett	Trinity North	Progressive Conservative	1972
James Reid	Trinity South	Progressive Conservative	1972
Herbert W. C. Gillett	Twillingate	Liberal	1972
Edward M. Roberts	White Bay North	Liberal	1966
William N. Rowe	White Bay South	Liberal	1966

== By-elections ==
By-elections were held to replace members for various reasons:

Electoral district	Member elected	Affiliation	Election date	Reason
Labrador South	Michael S. Martin	New Labrador Party	August 31, 1972	Election declared void by Supreme Court
Hermitage	Roger Simmons	Liberal	November 26, 1973	R Cheeseman resigned seat in March 1973
