= 38th General Assembly of Newfoundland =

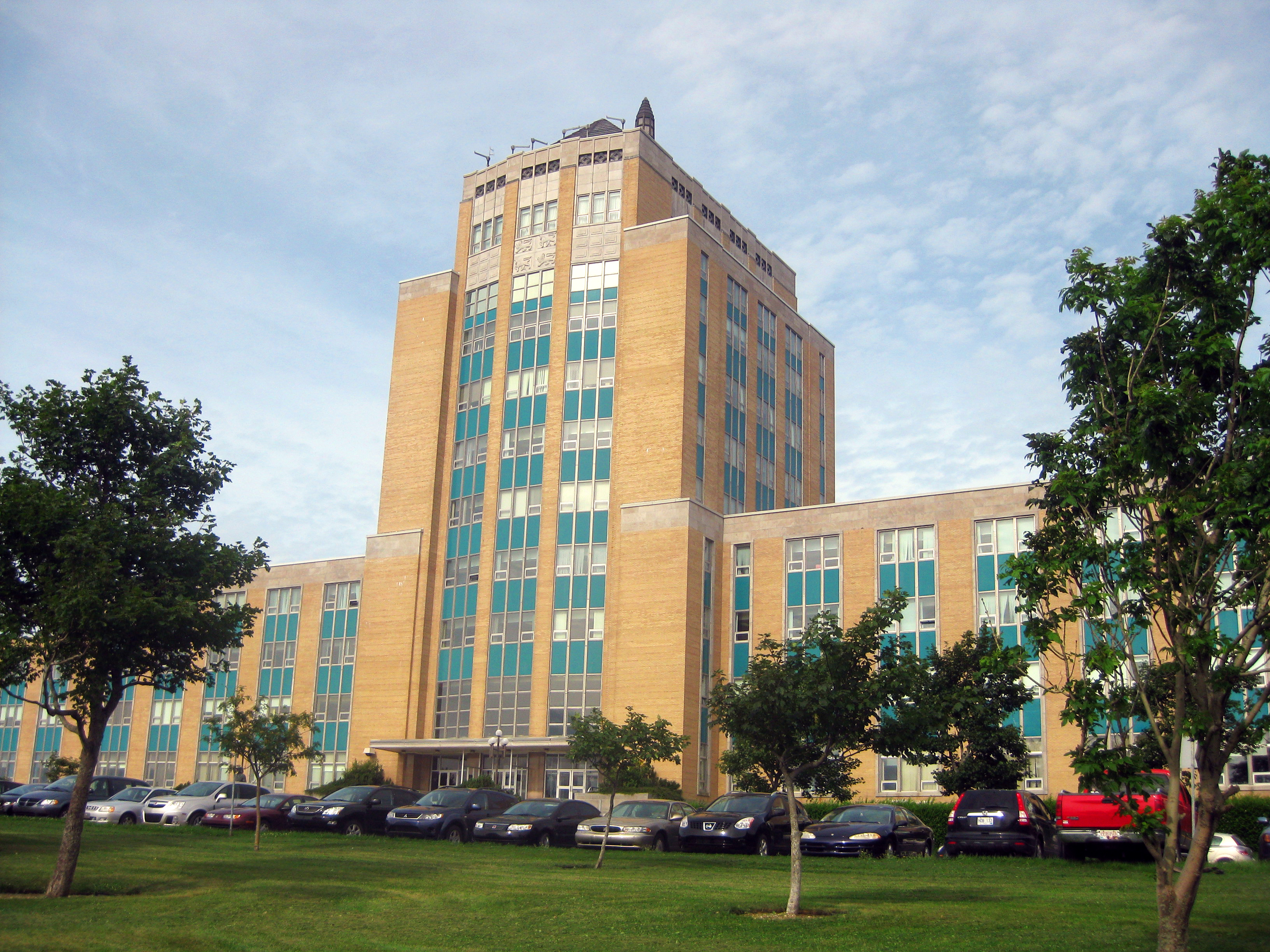
- Confederation Building East Block. Seat of the Newfoundland and Labrador government and the House of Assembly from 1960 to present.

History
- Founded: July 12, 1979
- Disbanded: March 15, 1982
- Preceded by: 37th General Assembly of Newfoundland
- Succeeded by: 39th General Assembly of Newfoundland

Leadership
- Premier: Brian Peckford

Elections
- Last election: 1979 Newfoundland general election

The members of the 38th General Assembly of Newfoundland were elected in the Newfoundland general election held in June 1979. The general assembly sat from July 12, 1979, to March 15, 1982.

The Progressive Conservative Party led by Brian Peckford formed the government.

Leonard Simms served as speaker.

There were four sessions of the 38th General Assembly:

Session	Start	End
1st	July 12, 1979	February 27, 1980
2nd	February 28, 1980	December 17, 1980
3rd	February 25, 1981	February 5, 1982
4th	March 11, 1982	March 15, 1982

Gordon Arnaud Winter served as lieutenant governor of Newfoundland until 1981. William Anthony Paddon succeeded Winter as lieutenant governor.

== Members of the Assembly ==
The following members were elected to the assembly in 1979:

Member	Electoral district	Party	First elected / previously elected
Thomas G. Rideout	Baie Verte-White Bay	Liberal	1975
Thomas G. Rideout	Baie Verte-White Bay	Progressive Conservative	1975
Luke Woodrow	Bay of Islands	Progressive Conservative	1975
Donald C. Jamieson	Bellevue	Liberal	1979
Wilson E. Callan (1981)	Bellevue	Liberal	1975, (Note: First Elected as Liberal Reform) 1981
Len Stirling	Bonavista North	Liberal	1979
James C. Morgan	Bonavista South	Progressive Conservative	1972
Roger Simmons	Burgeo-Bay d'Espoir	Liberal	1973
Harold Andrews (1979)	Burgeo-Bay d'Espoir	Progressive Conservative	1979
Donald C. Hollett	Burin-Placentia West	Liberal	1979
Rod Moores	Carbonear	Liberal	1975
John Butt	Conception Bay South	Progressive Conservative	1979
Eugene Hiscock	Eagle River	Liberal	1979
Hugh M. Twomey	Exploits	Progressive Conservative	1976
Charlie Power	Ferryland	Progressive Conservative	1975, 1977
Beaton Tulk	Fogo	Liberal	1979
Donald Stewart	Fortune-Hermitage	Progressive Conservative	1979
Hazel R. Newhook	Gander	Progressive Conservative	1979
Leslie Thoms	Grand Bank	Liberal	1979
Leonard Simms	Grand Falls	Progressive Conservative	1979
A. Brian Peckford	Green Bay	Progressive Conservative	1972
Haig Young	Harbour Grace	Progressive Conservative	1972
Norman Doyle	Harbour Main-Bell Island	Progressive Conservative	1979
Lynn E. Verge	Humber East	Progressive Conservative	1979
Wallace House	Humber Valley	Progressive Conservative	1975
Raymond Baird	Humber West	Progressive Conservative	1979
Robert Aylward	Kilbride	Progressive Conservative	1979
Stephen A. Neary	La Poile	Liberal	1962
Freeman White	Lewisporte	Liberal	1975
Peter J. Walsh	Menihek	Progressive Conservative	1979
Neil Windsor	Mount Pearl	Progressive Conservative	1975
Leo Barry	Mount Scio	Progressive Conservative	1972, (Note: Burin-Placentia West) 1979
Joseph Goudie	Naskaupi	Progressive Conservative	1975
William G. Patterson	Placentia	Progressive Conservative	1975
Jerome Dinn	Pleasantville	Progressive Conservative	1975
James Hodder	Port au Port	Liberal	1975
Randy Collins	Port de Grave	Progressive Conservative	1979
Trevor Bennett	St. Barbe	Liberal	1979
Ronald Dawe	St. George's	Progressive Conservative	1979
Patrick McNicholas	St. John's Centre	Progressive Conservative	1979
William Marshall	St. John's East	Progressive Conservative	1970
Thomas V. Hickey	St. John's East Extern	Progressive Conservative	1966
John A. Carter	St. John's North	Progressive Conservative	1971
John Collins	St. John's South	Progressive Conservative	1975
Harold Barrett	St. John's West	Progressive Conservative	1979
Walter C. Carter	St. Mary's-The Capes	Progressive Conservative	1962, (Note: First Elected as a Liberal) 1975
Derrick Hancock (1979)	St. Mary's-The Capes	Liberal	1979
Frederick Stagg	Stephenville	Progressive Conservative	1971, 1979
Edward Roberts	Strait of Belle Isle	Liberal	1966
Thomas Lush	Terra Nova	Liberal	1975
Garfield Warren	Torngat Mountains	Liberal	1979
Frederick B. Rowe	Trinity-Bay de Verde	Liberal	1972
Charles Brett	Trinity North	Progressive Conservative	1972
William N. Rowe	Twillingate	Liberal	1966, (Note: White Bay South) 1977
Gerry Ottenheimer	Waterford-Kenmount	Progressive Conservative	1966, (Note: St. John's East) 1971
Graham Flight	Windsor-Buchans	Liberal	1975

== By-elections ==
By-elections were held to replace members for various reasons:

Electoral district	Member elected	Affiliation	Election date	Reason
St. Mary's-The Capes	Derrick Hancock	Liberal	October 30, 1979	W Carter resigned seat to contest federal by-election
Burgeo-Bay d'Espoir	Harold Andrews	Progressive Conservative	November 29, 1979	R Simmons resigned seat to contest federal by-election
Bellevue	Wilson E. Callan	Liberal	April 13, 1981	DC Jamieson resigned seat in 1981
