= 39th General Assembly of Newfoundland =

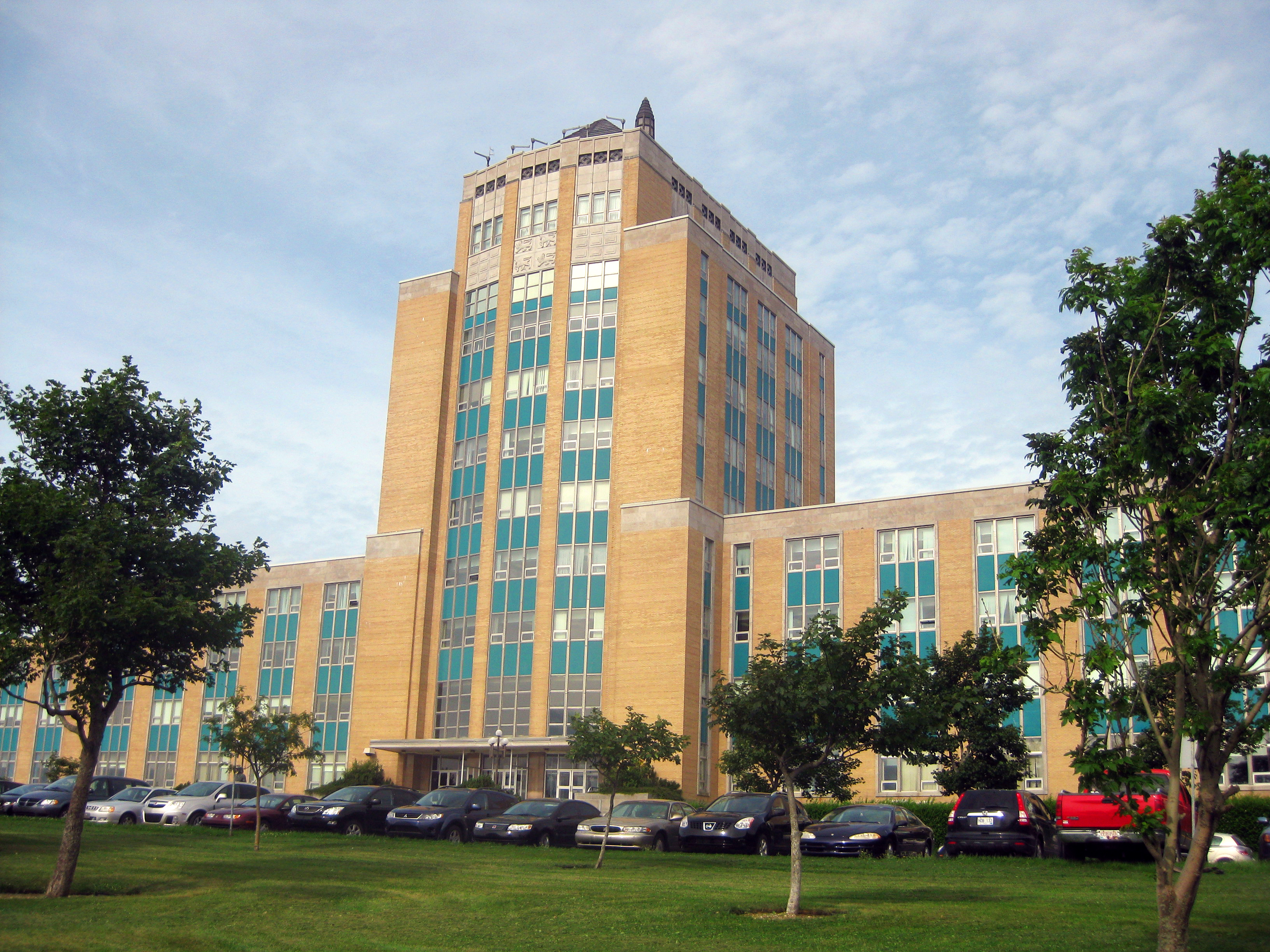
- Confederation Building East Block. Seat of the Newfoundland and Labrador government and the House of Assembly from 1960 to present.

History
- Founded: May 10, 1982
- Disbanded: March 11, 1985
- Preceded by: 38th General Assembly of Newfoundland
- Succeeded by: 40th General Assembly of Newfoundland

Leadership
- Premier: Brian Peckford

Elections
- Last election: 1982 Newfoundland general election

The members of the 39th General Assembly of Newfoundland were elected in the Newfoundland general election held in April 1982. The general assembly sat from May 10, 1982 to March 11, 1985.

The Progressive Conservative Party led by Brian Peckford formed the government.

James Russell served as speaker.

There were three sessions of the 39th General Assembly:

Session	Start	End
1st	May 10, 1982	February 10, 1983
2nd	March 3, 1983	February 29, 1984
3rd	March 12, 1984	March 11, 1985

William Anthony Paddon served as lieutenant governor of Newfoundland.

== Members of the Assembly ==
The following members were elected to the assembly in 1982:

Member	Electoral district	Party	First elected / previously elected
Thomas Gerard Rideout	Baie Verte-White Bay	Progressive Conservative	1975 (Note: First Elected as a Liberal)
Luke Woodrow	Bay of Islands	Progressive Conservative	1975
Wilson Elwood Callan	Bellevue	Liberal	1975, (Note: First Elected as Liberal Reform) 1981
Walter George Cross	Bonavista North	Progressive Conservative	1975, 1982
James C. Morgan	Bonavista South	Progressive Conservative	1972
Harold Dominey Andrews	Burgeo-Bay d'Espoir	Progressive Conservative	1979
Glenn Tobin	Burin-Placentia West	Progressive Conservative	1982
Milton Peach	Carbonear	Progressive Conservative	1982
John Butt	Conception Bay South	Progressive Conservative	1979
Eugene Hiscock	Eagle River	Liberal	1979
Hugh M. Twomey	Exploits	Progressive Conservative	1976
Charlie Power	Ferryland	Progressive Conservative	1975, 1977
Beaton Tulk	Fogo	Liberal	1979
Donald Stewart	Fortune-Hermitage	Progressive Conservative	1979
Hazel R. Newhook	Gander	Progressive Conservative	1979
William Matthews	Grand Bank	Progressive Conservative	1982
Leonard Simms	Grand Falls	Progressive Conservative	1979
A. Brian Peckford	Green Bay	Progressive Conservative	1972
Haig Young	Harbour Grace	Progressive Conservative	1972
Norman Doyle	Harbour Main-Bell Island	Progressive Conservative	1979
Lynn E. Verge	Humber East	Progressive Conservative	1979
Wallace House	Humber Valley	Progressive Conservative	1975
Raymond Baird	Humber West	Progressive Conservative	1979
Robert Aylward	Kilbride	Progressive Conservative	1979
Steve Neary	La Poile	Liberal	1962
James Russell	Lewisporte	Progressive Conservative	1971, 1982
Peter J. Walsh	Menihek	Progressive Conservative	1979
Peter Fenwick (1984)	Menihek	New Democrat	1984
Neil Windsor	Mount Pearl	Progressive Conservative	1979
Leo Barry	Mount Scio	Progressive Conservative	1972, (Note: Burin-Placentia West) 1979
Leo Barry	Mount Scio	Liberal	1972, 1979
Denzil Joseph Goudie	Naskaupi	Progressive Conservative	1975
William G. Patterson	Placentia	Progressive Conservative	1975
Jerome Dinn	Pleasantville	Progressive Conservative	1975
James Hodder	Port au Port	Liberal	1975
Randy W. Collins	Port de Grave	Progressive Conservative	1979
Everett K. Osmond	St. Barbe	Progressive Conservative	1982
Ronald Gilbert Dawe	St. George's	Progressive Conservative	1979
Patrick J. McNicholas	St. John's Centre	Progressive Conservative	1979
William Marshall	St. John's East	Progressive Conservative	1970
Thomas V. Hickey	St. John's East Extern	Progressive Conservative	1966
John A. Carter	St. John's North	Progressive Conservative	1971
John F. Collins	St. John's South	Progressive Conservative	1975
Harold Barrett	St. John's West	Progressive Conservative	1979
Loyola W. Hearn	St. Mary's-The Capes	Progressive Conservative	1982
Frederick Stagg	Stephenville	Progressive Conservative	1979
Edward Roberts	Strait of Belle Isle	Liberal	1966
Thomas Lush	Terra Nova	Liberal	1975
Glen Greening (1983)	Terra Nova	Progressive Conservative	1983
Garfield Warren	Torngat Mountains	Liberal	1979
Garfield Warren	Torngat Mountains	Progressive Conservative	1979
James G. Reid	Trinity-Bay de Verde	Progressive Conservative	1972, 1982
Charles Brett	Trinity North	Progressive Conservative	1972
Ida M. Reid	Twillingate	Progressive Conservative	1982
Gerald Ryan Ottenheimer	Waterford-Kenmount	Progressive Conservative	1966, (Note: St. John's East) 1971
John McLennon	Windsor-Buchans	Progressive Conservative	1982

== By-elections ==
By-elections were held to replace members for various reasons:

Electoral district	Member elected	Affiliation	Election date	Reason
Terra Nova	Glen Greening	Progressive Conservative	December 7, 1983	T Lush resigned seat in September 1983
Menihek	Peter Fenwick	New Democrat	October 9, 1984	PJ Walsh resigned seat in July 1984 to contest a federal seat
