= 1971 Newfoundland general election =

Canadian provincial election

- October 28, 1971

42 seats to the 35th General Assembly of Newfoundland 22 seats needed for a majority
- Turnout: 87.9% (▲26.1 pp)
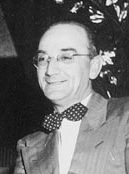
	First party	Second party	Third party
	PC		NLP
Leader	Frank Moores	Joey Smallwood	Tom Burgess
Party	Progressive Conservative	Liberal	New Labrador
Leader since	1970	1949	1969
Leader's seat	Humber West (Note: Not the incumbent, but stood in this seat and won)	Placentia East	Labrador West
Last election	3 seats, 33.69%	39 seats, 61.33%	New party
Seats won	21	20	1
Seat change	▲18	▼19	▲1
Popular vote	120,655	104,523	5,595
Percentage	51.34%	44.48%	2.38%
Swing	▲17.65pp	▼16.85pp	n/a
Premier before election
Joey Smallwood
Liberal
Premier after election
Joey Smallwood
Liberal

The 1971 Newfoundland general election was held on 28 October 1971 to elect members of the 35th General Assembly of Newfoundland. It resulted in a hung parliament as, with the support of the Labrador Party's lone MHA, the Smallwood government had the support of 21 MHAs compared to 21 for the Progressive Conservative party. Smallwood ultimately resigned in January 1972 allowing Moores' Tories to form a government but the instability in the House led to the March 24, 1972 provincial election.

== Results ==
Summary of the 1971 Newfoundland and Labrador House of Assembly election results
Political party	Party leader	Candidates	MHAs			Popular vote		
Political party	Party leader	Candidates	1966	1971	±	#	%	± (pp)
Progressive Conservative	Frank Moores	42	3	21	▲18	120,655	51.34%	▲17.65
Liberal	Joey Smallwood	42	39	20	▼19	104,523	44.48%	▼16.85
Labrador	Tom Burgess	3	n/a	1	▲1	5,595	2.38%	n/a
New Democratic	John Connors	17	0	0	Steady	3,718	1.58%	▼0.24
Independent Liberal		3	0	0	Steady	407	0.17%	n/a
Independent		1	0	0	Steady	109	0.05%	▼2.33
Total		108	42	42		235,007	100%	

== Results by district ==
- Names in **boldface type** represent party leaders.
- † indicates that the incumbent did not run again.
- ‡ indicates that the incumbent ran in a different district.

=== St. John's ===
Electoral district	Candidates				Incumbent
Electoral district	Liberal	PC	NDP	Other	Incumbent
St. John's Centre; 85.76% turnout	Leonard Levitz; 1,592; 28.95%	Anthony Murphy; 3,708; 67.43%	Graham Kelly; 90; 1.64%	David Owens (Independent); 109; 1.98%	Anthony Murphy
St. John's East; 85.91% turnout	Brendan Kelly; 1,270; 30.19%	William Marshall; 2,936; 69.81%			William Marshall
St. John's East Extern; 85.58% turnout	Howard Young; 3,487; 29.02%	Tom Hickey; 7,954; 66.19%	Walter Noel; 576; 4.79%		Tom Hickey
St. John's North; 90.52% turnout	Gordon Lidstone; 5,313; 34.77%	John Carter; 9,966; 65.23%			Nathaniel Noel†
St. John's South; 83.74% turnout	Francis Galgay; 3,082; 34.42%	Hugh Shea; 5,712; 63.79%	Roy Taylor; 160; 1.79%		John Nolan‡ (ran in Ferryland)
St. John's West; 85.05% turnout	Alma Badcock; 2,844; 30.85%	John Crosbie; 6,374; 69.15%			John Crosbie

=== Conception Bay ===
Electoral district	Candidates			Incumbent
Electoral district	Liberal	PC	Other	Incumbent
Bay de Verde; 77.66% turnout	William Saunders; 1,307; 50.40%	Brendan Howard; 1,286; 49.60%		William Saunders
Bell Island; 87.28% turnout	Steve Neary; 1,567; 65.65%	Bern Fitzpatrick; 820; 34.35%		Steve Neary
Carbonear; 88.91% turnout	George Clarke; 1,765; 49.06%	Augustus Rowe; 1,833; 50.94%		George Clarke
Harbour Grace; 84.93% turnout	Hubert Kitchen; 2,409; 52.91%	Harold Gosse; 1,875; 41.18%	Hubert Badcock (Independent Liberal); 269; 5.91%	Alec Moores†
Harbour Main; 83.28% turnout	John Mahoney; 3,605; 22.95%	Gordon Dawe; 4,417; 28.12%	Darrell Cole (NDP); 151; 0.96%	Philip Lewis†
Harbour Main; 83.28% turnout	Ralph Fagan; 3,452; 21.97%	William Doody; 4,084; 26.00%	Darrell Cole (NDP); 151; 0.96%	John Mahoney
Port de Grave; 83.29% turnout	James Hussey; 2,402; 55.90%	Herbert Bowering; 1,793; 41.73%	Edgar Russell (NDP); 102; 2.37%	Eric Dawe†

=== Avalon Peninsula ===
Electoral district	Candidates		Incumbent
Electoral district	Liberal	PC	Incumbent
Ferryland; 86.14% turnout	John Nolan; 1,874; 48.62%	Thomas Doyle; 1,980; 51.38%	Aidan Maloney†
Placentia East; 84.91% turnout	**Joey Smallwood**; 2,852; 58.61%	William Patterson; 2,014; 41.39%	Alain Frecker†
St. Mary's; 88.03% turnout	Michael Maher; 1,138; 48.34%	Gerry Ottenheimer; 1,216; 51.66%	James M. McGrath†
Trinity South; 78.38% turnout	Rupert Bartlett; 3,424; 61.62%	George Baker; 2,267; 40.80%	Uriah Strickland‡ (ran in Trinity North)

=== Eastern Newfoundland ===
Electoral district	Candidates			Incumbent
Electoral district	Liberal	PC	NDP	Incumbent
Bonavista North; 81.84% turnout	Paul Thoms; 3,324; 53.89%	Robert Wells; 2,844; 46.11%		Beaton Abbott†
Bonavista South; 74.58% turnout	Rossy Barbour; 3,050; 53.63%	Jim Morgan; 2,500; 43.96%	Gerald Hayley; 137; 2.41%	Rossy Barbour
Fogo; 77.04% turnout	Earl Winsor; 2,703; 58.10%	Frederick Jesperson; 1,949; 41.90%		Eric Jones†
Trinity North; 77.70% turnout	Uriah Strickland; 3,424; 56.87%	Eric Martin; 2,597; 43.13%		Maxwell Lane†

=== Central Newfoundland ===
Electoral district	Candidates				Incumbent
Electoral district	Liberal	PC	NDP	Other	Incumbent
Gander; 89.64% turnout	Douglas Sheppard; 2,861; 35.26%	Harold Collins; 5,030; 62.00%	Clarence Lingard; 222; 2.74%		Harold Collins
Grand Falls; 85.27% turnout	Frederick W. Rowe; 3,601; 42.91%	Aubrey Senior; 3,987; 47.51%	**John Connors**; 804; 9.58%		Frederick W. Rowe
Green Bay; 81.22% turnout	Harold Starkes; 2,687; 56.38%	Aubrey Rolfe; 1,835; 38.50%	Harold Card; 244; 5.12%		William Smallwood†
Lewisporte; 83.24% turnout	John Whalen; 2,364; 45.92%	James Russell; 2,614; 50.78%	Walwin Blackmore; 170; 3.30%		Harold Starkes‡ (ran in Green Bay)
Twillingate; 81.76% turnout	William Adams; 2,155; 58.69%	John Loveridge; 1,487; 40.50%	Roderick Woolridge; 30; 0.82%		Leslie Curtis†
White Bay South; 88.85% turnout	Bill Rowe; 2,477; 61.42%	William Eaton; 1,433; 35.53%	Martin Saunders; 73; 1.81%	Ronald Budgell (Independent Liberal); 50; 1.24%	Bill Rowe

=== Southern Newfoundland ===
Electoral district	Candidates			Incumbent
Electoral district	Liberal	PC	Other	Incumbent
Burgeo-La Poile; 79.85% turnout	Walter Hodder; 2,674; 47.66%	Allan Evans; 2,762; 49.22%	Andrew Wells (NDP); 175; 3.12%	Walter Hodder
Burin; 93.11% turnout	Alex Hickman; 3,655; 54.51%	Don Hollett; 3,050; 45.49%		Alex Hickman
Fortune Bay; 78.93% turnout	H.R.V. Earle; 1,206; 45.29%	Augustus Oldford; 1,457; 54.71%		H.R.V. Earle
Hermitage; 82.89% turnout	Harold Piercey; 1,850; 52.20%	Roy Cheeseman; 1,585; 44.72%	Leo Coffey (NDP); 109; 3.08%	Abel Wornell†
Placentia West; 85.30% turnout	Patrick Canning; 2,387; 64.25%	Lawrence Hudson; 1,240; 33.38%	Thomas Fitzpatrick (Independent Liberal); 88; 2.37%	Patrick Canning

=== Western Newfoundland ===
Electoral district	Candidates			Incumbent
Electoral district	Liberal	PC	NDP	Incumbent
Humber East; 89.66% turnout	George Warren; 2,998; 33.34%	Tom Farrell; 5,654; 62.87%	Calvin Hillyard; 341; 3.79%	Clyde Wells†
Humber West; 90.95% turnout	Noel Murphy; 3,270; 36.36%	**Frank Moores**; 5,959; 66.26%	James Walsh; 234; 2.60%	**Joey Smallwood**‡ (ran in Placentia East)
Port au Port; 93.50% turnout	William Callahan; 2,730; 40.22%	Frederick Stagg; 4,057; 59.78%		William Callahan
St. Barbe North; 83.34% turnout	James Chalker; 1,354; 66.57%	Boyd Hiscock; 680; 33.43%		James Chalker
St. Barbe South; 87.95% turnout (Note: A judicial recount was initiated in this riding. However, it was discovered during the process that the deputy returning officer had accidentally burned the 106 ballots for the community of Sally's Cove, which made it impossible to complete the recount. Consequently, the Supreme Court of Newfoundland decreed that Maynard had been elected. The initial results of the election are shown here in italics.)	Trevor Bennett; 1,748; 49.89%	Edward Maynard; 1,756; 50.11%		Gerald Myrden†
St. George's; 89.83% turnout	Jeremiah Horan; 1,777; 43.27%	Alexander Dunphy; 2,327; 56.66%		Vacant (Note: William Keough had been elected in 1966, but he died while in office on March 3, 1971.)
White Bay North; 85.57% turnout	Edward Roberts; 3,140; 81.36%	Gerald Moore; 719; 18.63%		Edward Roberts

=== Labrador ===
Electoral district	Candidates				Incumbent
Electoral district	Liberal	PC	Labrador	NDP	Incumbent
Labrador North	Melvin Woodward; 1,858; 44.64%	Arthur Hale; 709; 17.04%	Herbert Brett; 1,545; 37.12%		Earl Winsor‡ (ran in Fogo)
Labrador South; 84.32% turnout	Joe Harvey; 890; 47.52%	Edward Kean; 176; 9.40%	Michael Martin; 807; 43.09%		Gerald Hill†
Labrador West	Roy Legge; 1,445; 22.41%	Peter Walsh; 1,659; 25.73%	**Tom Burgess**; 3,243; 50.30%	Michael Neville; 100; 1.55%	**Tom Burgess**
