= 1979 Newfoundland general election =

Canadian provincial election

- June 18, 1979

52 seats to the 38th General Assembly of Newfoundland 27 seats needed for a majority
- Turnout: 73.6% (▲0.8% pp)
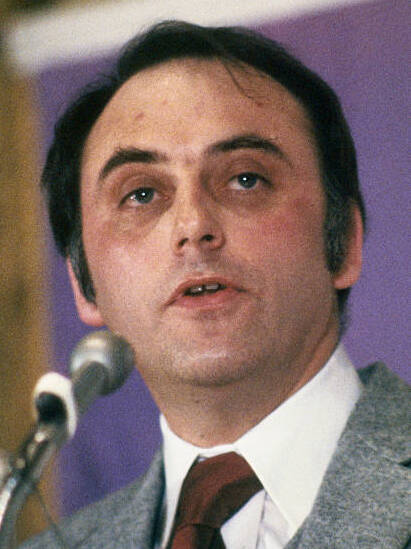

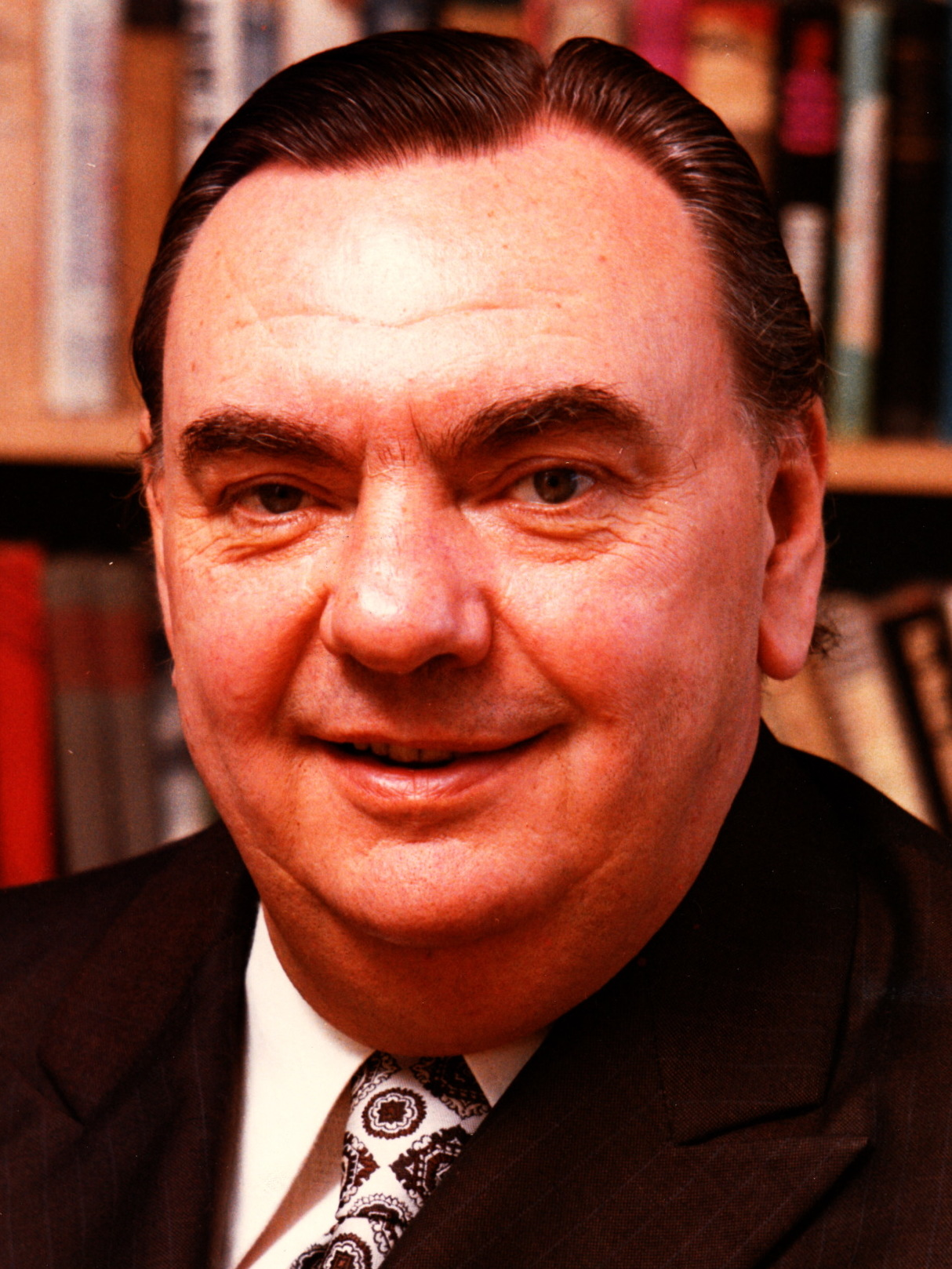
| | First party | Second party | Third party |
|---|---|---|---|
| | | | NDP |
| Leader | Brian Peckford | Donald Jamieson | John Greene |
| Party | Progressive Conservative | Liberal | New Democratic |
| Leader since | March 26, 1979 | 1979 | 1977 |
| Leader's seat | Green Bay | Bellevue (Note: Not the incumbent, but stood in this seat and won.) | Ran in St. John's West (lost) |
| Last election | 30 seats, 45.54% | 16 seats, 37.09% | 0 seats, 4.35% |
| Seats won | 33 | 19 | 0 |
| Seat change | ▲3 | ▲3 | Steady |
| Popular vote | 119,151 | 95,943 | 18,507 |
| Percentage | 50.25% | 40.46% | 7.80% |
| Swing | ▲4.71pp | ▲3.37pp | ▲3.45pp |
Premier before election
Brian Peckford
Progressive Conservative
Premier after election
Brian Peckford
Progressive Conservative

The 1979 Newfoundland general election was held on June 18, 1979 to elect members of the 38th General Assembly of Newfoundland. It was won by the Progressive Conservative party.

== Results ==
| Party | Leader | 1975 | Seats won | % change | Popular vote | (%) |
|---|---|---|---|---|---|---|
| Progressive Conservative | Brian Peckford | 30 | 33 | +10% | 119,151 | 50.4% |
| Liberal | Donald Jamieson | 16 | 19 | +19% | 95,943 | 40.6% |
| New Democratic | John Greene | 0 | 0 | 0% | 18,507 | 7.8% |
| Other | | 5 | 0 | 0% | 2,786 | 1.2% |
| Totals | | 51 | 52 | - | 237,135 | 100% |

== Results by district ==
- Names in **boldface type** represent party leaders.
- † indicates that the incumbent did not run again.

=== St. John's ===
| Electoral district | Candidates | | | | Incumbent |
| Electoral district | PC | Liberal | NDP | Other | Incumbent |
|---|---|---|---|---|---|
| Kilbride; 74.91% turnout | Robert Aylward; 3,863; 64.61% | Robert Hall; 1,833; 30.66% | Stan MacDonald; 283; 4.73% | | Robert Wells† |
| Pleasantville; 80.63% turnout | Jerome Dinn; 4,532; 63.24% | David Riche; 1,973; 27.53% | Gerry Panting; 661; 9.23% | | Jerome Dinn |
| St. John's Centre; 79.41% turnout | Patrick McNicholas; 2,173; 60.14% | Hugh Shea; 773; 21.40% | Valerie Summers; 449; 12.43% | Lewis Murphy (Independent); 128; 3.54% | Anthony Murphy† |
| St. John's Centre; 79.41% turnout | Patrick McNicholas; 2,173; 60.14% | Hugh Shea; 773; 21.40% | Valerie Summers; 449; 12.43% | Dorothy Wyatt (Independent); 90; 2.49% | Anthony Murphy† |
| St. John's East; 63.90% turnout | William Marshall; 2,111; 70.74% | Jaime Wyatt; 520; 17.43% | David Thompson; 353; 11.83% | | William Marshall |
| St. John's North; 81.83% turnout | John Carter; 2,536; 61.57% | Bill Case; 1,332; 32.34% | Margaret Panting; 251; 6.09% | | John Carter |
| St. John's South; 74.11% turnout | John Collins; 2,221; 62.16% | Jim Furlong; 1,171; 32.77% | Gus Breen; 181; 5.07% | | John Collins |
| St. John's West; 76.37% turnout | Harold Barrett; 2,037; 51.11% | Hubert Kitchen; 1,402; 34.34% | **John Greene**; 594; 14.55% | | Hubert Kitchen |
| Waterford-Kenmount; 71.82% turnout | Gerry Ottenheimer; 3,842; 61.95% | William Callahan; 1,992; 32.12% | David Grimes; 448; 10.66% | | Gerry Ottenheimer |

=== St. John's suburbs ===
| Electoral district | Candidates | | | | Incumbent |
| Electoral district | PC | Liberal | NDP | Other | Incumbent |
|---|---|---|---|---|---|
| Conception Bay South; 75.40% turnout | John Butt; 3,503; 46.28% | John Nolan; 2,620; 34.60% | Boyd Batten; 319; 4.21% | Gordon Dawe (Independent Progressive Conservative); 1,035; 13.67% | John Nolan |
| Conception Bay South; 75.40% turnout | John Butt; 3,503; 46.28% | John Nolan; 2,620; 34.60% | Boyd Batten; 319; 4.21% | Richard Gosse (Independent); 94; 1.24% | John Nolan |
| Mount Pearl; 75.01% turnout | Neil Windsor; 3,535; 56.23% | Stuart Toope; 2,009; 31.95% | Helen Porter; 743; 11.82% | | Neil Windsor |
| Mount Scio; 87.78% turnout | Leo Barry; 3,663; 62.19% | Phil Warren; 1,907; 32.38% | Raymond Ryall; 320; 5.43% | | Ray Winsor† |
| St. John's East Extern; 79.34% turnout | Tom Hickey; 3,989; 61.63% | Roland Manning; 1,970; 30.44% | Ed Roche; 513; 7.93% | | Tom Hickey |

=== Avalon Peninsula ===
| Electoral district | Candidates | | | | Incumbent |
| Electoral district | PC | Liberal | NDP | Other | Incumbent |
|---|---|---|---|---|---|
| Carbonear; 69.21% turnout | Ross Cole; 1,642; 33.39% | Rod Moores; 3,188; 64.82% | Alex Thomson; 88; 1.79% | | Rod Moores |
| Ferryland; 82.35% turnout | Charlie Power; 2,678; 64.95% | Jean Payne; 860; 20.86% | Alfred Sullivan; 585; 14.14% | | Charlie Power |
| Harbour Grace; 81.31% turnout | Haig Young; 2,420; 52.90% | Patrick O'Flaherty; 2,073; 45.31% | Robert Stacey; 82; 1.79% | | Haig Young |
| Harbour Main-Bell Island; 75.92% turnout | Norman Doyle; 3,100; 60.67% | Thomas Moore; 1,601; 31.33% | Margaret Peddle; 226; 4.42% | Michael Laurie (Independent); 183; 3.58% | William Doody† |
| Placentia; 79.78% turnout | William Patterson; 1,962; 46.34% | William Hogan; 1,420; 33.54% | Patrick Fleming; 78; 1.84% | Anthony Sparrow (Independent); 774; 18.28% | William Patterson |
| Port de Grave; 74.89% turnout | Randy W. Collins; 2,989; 56.39% | William Smallwood; 2,200; 41.50% | Edward McGrath; 78; 1.47% | Ted Noseworthy (Independent); 34; 0.64% | Eric Dawe† |
| St. Mary's-The Capes; 74.72% turnout | Walter Carter; 2,702; 73.62% | Patrick Molloy; 896; 26.35% | Roy Moyles; 82; 2.23% | | Walter Carter |
| Trinity-Bay de Verde; 71.17% turnout | Eli Bryant; 1,597; 39.30% | Frederick B. Rowe; 2,237; 55.06% | Nelson Palmer; 229; 5.64% | | Frederick B. Rowe |

=== Eastern Newfoundland ===
| Electoral district | Candidates | | | Incumbent |
| Electoral district | PC | Liberal | NDP | Incumbent |
|---|---|---|---|---|
| Bellevue; 70.49% turnout | Robert Peddle; 1,546; 29.63% | **Don Jamieson**; 3,522; 67.51% | Genevieve Connors; 149; 2.86% | Wilson Callan† |
| Bonavista North; 76.71% turnout | George Cross; 2,395; 47.88% | Len Stirling; 2,515; 50.28% | Naomi Pickett; 92; 1.84% | George Cross |
| Bonavista South; 65.78% turnout | Jim Morgan; 2,642; 70.04% | Jim Ryan; 1,011; 26.80% | Joseph Templeman; 119; 3.16% | Jim Morgan |
| Fogo; 75.06% turnout | Wayne Wheaton; 2,053; 44.54% | Beaton Tulk; 2,424; 52.59% | Clifford Wells; 132; 2.87% | Earl Winsor† |
| Terra Nova; 69.53% turnout | Glen Greening; 1,596; 37.10% | Tom Lush; 2,579; 59.95% | Lowell Paulson; 127; 2.95% | Tom Lush |
| Trinity North; 75.12% turnout | Charlie Brett; 3,149; 63.73% | Jack Pelley; 1,596; 32.30% | Roger Desrosiers; 196; 3.97% | Charlie Brett |

=== Central Newfoundland ===
| Electoral district | Candidates | | | Incumbent |
| Electoral district | PC | Liberal | NDP | Incumbent |
|---|---|---|---|---|
| Baie Verte-White Bay; 74.09% turnout | Roy Barker; 1,688; 33.51% | Tom Rideout; 2,830; 56.17% | Gerald Dwyer; 520; 10.32% | Tom Rideout |
| Exploits; 64.21% turnout | Hugh Twomey; 2,753; 56.44% | Munden Batstone; 1,702; 34.89% | Ronald Chafe; 423; 8.67% | Hugh Twomey |
| Gander; 74.72% turnout | Hazel Newhook; 2,362; 47.45% | Randy Simms; 1,054; 21.17% | Winston Baker; 1,562; 31.38% | Harold Collins† |
| Grand Falls; 81.59% turnout | Len Simms; 2,556; 58.74% | Roger Grimes; 1,346; 30.94% | Andrew Barker; 449; 10.32% | John Lundrigan† |
| Green Bay; 75.30% turnout | **Brian Peckford**; 3,502; 77.04% | Maurice Budgell; 987; 21.71% | Brian Walsh; 57; 1.25% | **Brian Peckford** |
| Lewisporte; 77.99% turnout | John Whalen; 2,667; 47.42% | Freeman White; 2,796; 49.72% | Berkley Rose; 161; 2.86% | Freeman White |
| Twillingate; 67.82% turnout | Iain Small; 1,238; 35.57% | Bill Rowe; 1,980; 56.90% | Roderick Woolridge; 262; 7.53% | Bill Rowe |
| Windsor-Buchans; 77.17% turnout | Clarence King; 1,580; 37.61% | Graham Flight; 2,173; 51.73% | David Grimes; 448; 10.66% | Graham Flight |

=== Southern Newfoundland ===
| Electoral district | Candidates | | | | Incumbent |
| Electoral district | PC | Liberal | NDP | Other | Incumbent |
|---|---|---|---|---|---|
| Burgeo-Bay d'Espoir; 73.60% turnout | Patrick Perry; 1,068; 30.02% | Roger Simmons; 2,211; 62.16% | Barry Roberts; 278; 7.82% | | Roger Simmons |
| Burin-Placentia West; 78.32% turnout | Ed Mayo; 1,876; 32.80% | Don Hollett; 3,737; 65.35% | Don Baird; 106; 1.85% | | Patrick Canning† |
| Fortune-Hermitage; 68.08% turnout | Don Stewart; 1,770; 46.79% | Jack Winsor; 1,510; 39.92% | David Howley; 55; 1.45% | Gary Wells (Independent Liberal); 448; 11.84% | Jack Winsor |
| Grand Bank; 73.94% turnout | Clarence Rogers; 1,646; 31.21% | Leslie Thoms; 3,431; 65.04% | Harvey Tulk Jr. 198; 3.75% | | Alex Hickman† |
| La Poile; 69.46% turnout | Cabot Martin; 1,907; 44.90% | Steve Neary; 2,283; 53.76% | Viola Puddester; 57; 1.34% | | Steve Neary |

=== Western Newfoundland ===
| Electoral district | Candidates | | | Incumbent |
| Electoral district | PC | Liberal | NDP | Incumbent |
|---|---|---|---|---|
| Bay of Islands; 63.09% turnout | Luke Woodrow; 2,293; 54.04% | Jim Walsh; 1,393; 32.83% | Val McAbee; 557; 13.13% | Luke Woodrow |
| Humber East; 70.72% turnout | Lynn Verge; 2,489; 58.41% | George Colbourne; 1,297; 30.44% | Eric Mintz; 475; 11.15% | Tom Farrell† |
| Humber Valley; 65.24% turnout | Wallace House; 2,465; 52.64% | Kevin Saunders; 1,723; 36.79% | Allan French; 495; 10.57% | Wallace House |
| Humber West; 67.91% turnout | Ray Baird; 2,495; 56.76% | Raymond Pollett; 1,131; 25.73% | Sandy MacRae; 770; 17.51% | Frank Moores† |
| Port au Port; 78.77% turnout | Don Bennett; 1,431; 40.55% | Jim Hodder; 1,839; 52.11% | Thomas McCarthy; 259; 7.34% | Jim Hodder |
| St. Barbe; 66.22% turnout | Edward Maynard; 1,603; 37.02% | Trevor Bennett; 1,938; 44.76% | Peter Fenwick; 789; 18.22% | Edward Maynard |
| St. George's; 71.48% turnout | Ron Dawe; 1,942; 47.45% | Hazel McIsaac; 1,396; 34.11% | Victor Bennett; 755; 18.44% | Hazel McIsaac |
| Stephenville; 72.05% turnout | Frederick Stagg; 1,931; 51.15% | William MacNeil; 1,596; 42.28% | Bill Beardow; 248; 6.57% | William MacNeil |
| Strait of Belle Isle; 64.35% turnout | Eric Squires; 599; 14.68% | Edward Roberts; 3,136; 76.86% | Levi Squires; 345; 8.46% | Edward Roberts |

=== Labrador ===
| Electoral district | Candidates | | | Incumbent |
| Electoral district | PC | Liberal | NDP | Incumbent |
|---|---|---|---|---|
| Eagle River; 61.89% turnout | Claude Rumbolt; 754; 44.46% | Eugene Hiscock; 865; 51.00% | Elsie McDonald; 77; 4.54% | Ian Strachan† |
| Menihek; 71.45% turnout | Peter Walsh; 1,862; 35.50% | Gordon Manstan; 1,776; 33.86% | Nelson Larson; 1,607; 30.64% | Joseph Rousseau† |
| Naskaupi; 79.50% turnout | Joseph Goudie; 1,760; 47.00% | Melvin Woodward; 1,729; 46.17% | Michael Power; 256; 6.83% | Joseph Goudie |
| Torngat Mountains; 73.99% turnout | William Flowers; 388; 45.76% | Garfield Warren; 460; 54.24% | | New district |
