= Labrador West (electoral district) =

Provincial electoral district in Newfoundland and Labrador, Canada

Newfoundland and Labrador electoral district
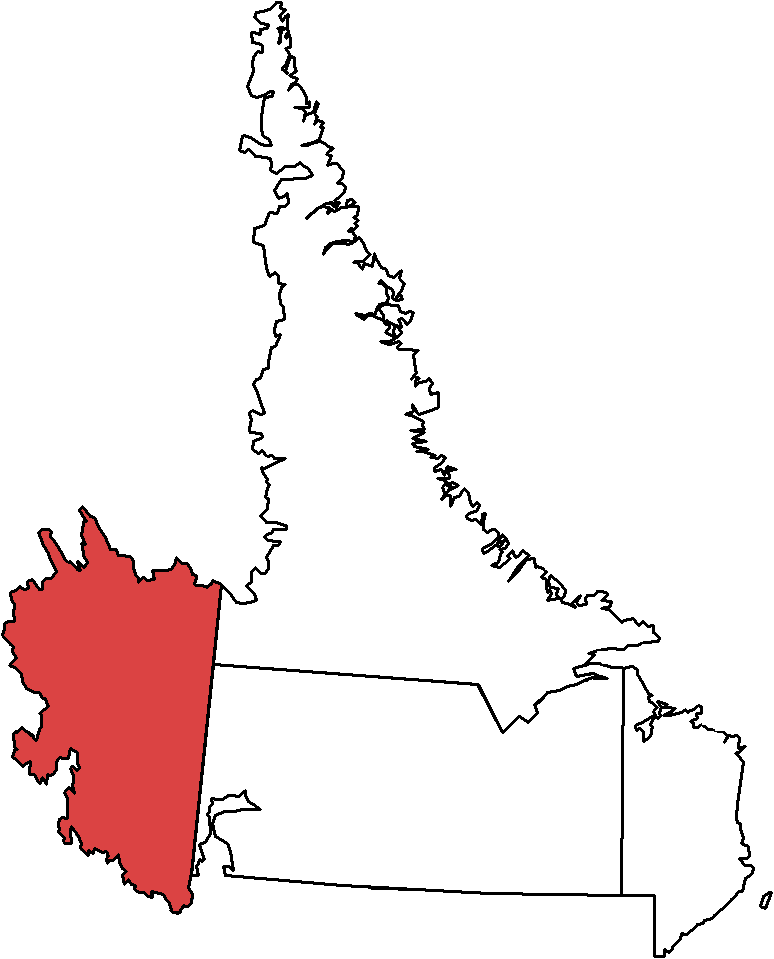
- Labrador West in relation to other districts in Labrador

Provincial electoral district
- Legislature: Newfoundland and Labrador House of Assembly
MHA
Joseph Power
Progressive Conservative
- District created: 1962
- First contested: 1962
- Last contested: 2025

Demographics
- Population (2011): 9,238
- Electors (2015): 6,202
- Area (km²): 60,350
- Census division: Division No. 10
- Census subdivision(s): Labrador City, Wabush, Division No. 10, Subd. D

Labrador West is a provincial electoral district for the House of Assembly of Newfoundland and Labrador, Canada. From the 1975 election to 1996, the district was known as Menihek.

Known as the iron ore capital of Canada with two modern mining communities, Labrador City and Wabush, the district has a strong base of labour support. This district was the first in Newfoundland and Labrador to send a New Democratic member to the House of Assembly, electing party leader Peter Fenwick in a 1984 by-election. The NDP regained the seat in 2019 election, beating the Liberals by a mere two votes and holding the riding in the 2021 general election by a twenty one point margin.

== Members of the House of Assembly ==
The district has elected the following members of the House of Assembly:

Assembly	Years	Member	Party
Labrador West
33rd	1962–1966	Charles Devine	Independent
34th	1966–1969	Thomas W. Burgess	Liberal
34th	1969–1971	Thomas W. Burgess	Labrador Party
35th	1972	Thomas W. Burgess	Labrador Party
35th	1972	Thomas W. Burgess	Liberal
36th	1972–1975	Joseph G. Rousseau	Progressive Conservative
Menihek
37th	1975–1979	Joseph G. Rousseau	Progressive Conservative
38th	1979–1982	Peter J. Walsh	Progressive Conservative
39th	1982–1984	Peter J. Walsh	Progressive Conservative
39th	1984–1985	Peter Fenwick	New Democratic
40th	1985–1989	Peter Fenwick	New Democratic
41st	1989–1993	Alec Snow	Progressive Conservative
42nd	1993–1996	Alec Snow	Progressive Conservative
Labrador West
43rd	1996–1999	Perry Canning	Liberal
44th	1999–2003	Randy Collins	New Democratic
45th	2003–2007	Randy Collins	New Democratic
45th	2007	Jim Baker	Progressive Conservative
46th	2007–2011	Jim Baker	Progressive Conservative
47th	2011–2015	Nick McGrath	Progressive Conservative
48th	2015–2019	Graham Letto	Liberal
49th	2019–2021	Jordan Brown	New Democratic
50th	2021–2025	Jordan Brown	New Democratic
51st	2025–present	Joseph Power	Progressive Conservative

== Election results ==
Graph of election results (minor parties that never got 2% of the vote or did not run consistently are omitted) View source data.

2025 Newfoundland and Labrador general election
Party	Candidate	Votes	%	±%
Progressive Conservative	Joseph Power	1,639	47.27	+26.03
Liberal	Todd Seward	1,364	39.34	+10.62
New Democratic	Shazia Razi	464	13.38	-36.65
Total valid votes		3,467		
Total rejected ballots				
Turnout				
Eligible voters				
Progressive Conservative gain from New Democratic		Swing		+31.34

2021 Newfoundland and Labrador general election
Party	Candidate	Votes	%	±%
New Democratic	Jordan Brown	1,359	50.04	+7.87
Liberal	Wayne Button	780	28.72	-13.38
Progressive Conservative	Nick McGrath	577	21.24	+5.51
Total valid votes		2,716	99.89	
Total rejected ballots		3	0.11	
Turnout		2,719	43.23	
Eligible voters		6,289		
New Democratic hold		Swing		+10.63
Source(s) "Officially Nominated Candidates General Election 2021" (PDF). Elections Newfoundland and Labrador. "NL Election 2021 (Unofficial Results)".

2019 Newfoundland and Labrador general election
Party	Candidate	Votes	%	±%
New Democratic	Jordan Brown	1,364	42.16	+7.43
Liberal	Graham Letto	1,362	42.10	-1.70
Progressive Conservative	Derick Sharron	509	15.73	-5.73
Total valid votes		3,235	99.20	
Total rejected ballots		26	0.80	+0.38
Turnout		3,261	54.21	+0.51
Eligible voters		6,015		
New Democratic gain from Liberal		Swing		+4.57
These results were subject to a recount, where Brown's lead was reduced from four votes to two.

2015 Newfoundland and Labrador general election
Party	Candidate	Votes	%	±%
Liberal	Graham Letto	1,453	43.81	+27.42
New Democratic	Ron Barron	1,152	34.73	+2.06
Progressive Conservative	Nick McGrath	712	21.46	-29.48
Total valid votes		3,317	99.58	–
Total rejected ballots		14	0.42	–
Turnout		3,331	53.71	-3.33
Eligible voters		6,202		
Liberal gain from Progressive Conservative		Swing		+14.74
Source: Elections Newfoundland and Labrador

2011 Newfoundland and Labrador general election
Party	Candidate	Votes	%	±%
Progressive Conservative	Nick McGrath	1,843	50.94	+0.14
New Democratic	Tom Harris	1,182	32.67	-9.92
Liberal	Karen Oldford	593	16.39	+9.78
Total valid votes		3,618	99.72	–
Total rejected ballots		10	0.28	–
Turnout		3,628	57.04	-11.33
Eligible voters		6,360		
Progressive Conservative hold		Swing		+5.03
Source: Elections Newfoundland and Labrador

2007 Newfoundland and Labrador general election
Party	Candidate	Votes	%	±%
Progressive Conservative	Jim Baker	2,204	50.80	+9.18
New Democratic	Darrel J. Brenton	1,848	42.59	+11.62
Liberal	Karen Oldford	287	6.61	-4.06
Total valid votes		4,339	99.79	–
Total rejected ballots		9	0.21	–
Turnout		4,348	68.37	+18.28
Eligible voters		6,360		
Progressive Conservative hold		Swing		+10.40
Source: Elections Newfoundland and Labrador

Newfoundland and Labrador provincial by-election, March 13, 2007 upon the resignation of Randy Collins
Party	Candidate	Votes	%	±%
Progressive Conservative	Jim Baker	1,666	41.62	+18.59
New Democratic	Darrel J. Brenton	1,240	30.97	-24.74
Labrador	Ron Barron	670	16.74	+4.01
Liberal	Karen Oldford	427	10.67	+2.14
Total valid votes		4,003	99.80	–
Total rejected ballots		8	0.20	–
Turnout		4,011	50.09	-10.90
Eligible voters		8,008		
Progressive Conservative gain from New Democratic		Swing		+21.67
Source: Elections Newfoundland and Labrador

2003 Newfoundland and Labrador general election
Party	Candidate	Votes	%	±%
New Democratic	Randy Collins	2,762	55.71	+7.87
Progressive Conservative	Graham Letto	1,142	23.03	+15.94
Labrador	Ern Condon	631	12.73	+12.73
Liberal	Doris Sacrey	423	8.53	-36.54
Total valid votes		4,958	99.80	–
Total rejected ballots		10	0.20	–
Turnout		4,968	60.99	-6.85
Eligible voters		8,145		
New Democratic hold		Swing		+11.91
Source: Elections Newfoundland and Labrador

1999 Newfoundland general election
Party	Candidate	Votes	%	±%
New Democratic	Randy Collins	2,700	47.84	+47.84
Liberal	Perry Canning	2,544	45.07	-16.69
Progressive Conservative	Susan Whitten	400	7.09	-31.15
Total valid votes		5,644	99.68	–
Total rejected ballots		18	0.32	–
Turnout		5,662	67.84	-5.57
Eligible voters		8,346		
New Democratic gain from Liberal		Swing		+32.27
Source: Elections Newfoundland and Labrador

1996 Newfoundland general election
Party	Candidate	Votes	%	±%
Liberal	Perry Canning	3,457	61.76	+15.76
Progressive Conservative	Alec Snow	2,140	38.24	-11.74
Total valid votes		5,597	99.77	–
Total rejected ballots		13	0.23	–
Turnout		5,610	73.41	+0.74
Eligible voters		7,642		
Liberal gain from Progressive Conservative		Swing		+13.75
Source: Elections Newfoundland and Labrador

1993 Newfoundland general election
Party	Candidate	Votes	%	±%
Progressive Conservative	Alec Snow	3,086	49.98	-3.17
Liberal	Perry Canning	2,840	46.00	+5.47
New Democratic	Ruth Larson	248	4.02	-2.30
Total valid votes		6,174	99.74	–
Total rejected ballots		16	0.26	–
Turnout		6,190	72.67	-14.35
Eligible voters		8,518		
Progressive Conservative hold		Swing		-4.32
Source: Elections Newfoundland and Labrador

1989 Newfoundland general election
Party	Candidate	Votes	%	±%
Progressive Conservative	Alec Snow	3,004	53.15	+7.76
Liberal	Bill Kelly	2,291	40.53	+35.33
New Democratic	Nelson Larson	357	6.32	-43.09
Total valid votes		5,652	99.86	–
Total rejected ballots		8	0.14	–
Turnout		5,660	87.02	-3.80
Eligible voters		6,504		
Progressive Conservative gain from New Democratic		Swing		+21.55
Source: Elections Newfoundland and Labrador

1985 Newfoundland general election
Party	Candidate	Votes	%	±%
New Democratic	Peter Fenwick	2,841	49.41	+9.09
Progressive Conservative	Alec Snow	2,610	45.39	+6.45
Liberal	Andrew Spracklin	299	5.20	-15.54
Total valid votes		5,750	99.71	–
Total rejected ballots		17	0.29	–
Turnout		5,767	90.82	+31.99
Eligible voters		6,350		
New Democratic hold		Swing		+7.77
Source: Elections Newfoundland and Labrador

Newfoundland provincial by-election, October 9, 1984 upon the resignation of Peter J. Walsh
Party	Candidate	Votes	%	±%
New Democratic	Peter Fenwick	1,744	40.32	+26.02
Progressive Conservative	Alec Snow	1,684	38.94	-19.91
Liberal	Danny Dumaresque	897	20.74	-6.11
Total valid votes		4,325	99.77	–
Total rejected ballots		10	0.23	–
Turnout		4,335	58.83	-24.09
Eligible voters		7,369		
New Democratic gain from Progressive Conservative		Swing		+22.97
Source: Elections Newfoundland and Labrador

1982 Newfoundland general election
Party	Candidate	Votes	%	±%
Progressive Conservative	Peter J. Walsh	3,589	58.85	+23.35
Liberal	Gordon C. Manstan	1,637	26.85	-7.01
New Democratic	Roland LeGrow	872	14.30	-16.34
Total valid votes		6,098	99.80	–
Total rejected ballots		12	0.20	–
Turnout		6,110	82.92	+11.45
Eligible voters		7,369		
Progressive Conservative hold		Swing		+15.18
Source: Elections Newfoundland and Labrador

1979 Newfoundland general election
Party	Candidate	Votes	%	±%
Progressive Conservative	Peter J. Walsh	1,862	35.50	-29.50
Liberal	Gordon C. Manstan	1,776	33.86	+18.10
New Democratic	Nelson Larson	1,607	30.64	+22.42
Total valid votes		5,245	99.62	–
Total rejected ballots		20	0.38	–
Turnout		5,265	71.45	+21.06
Eligible voters		7,369		
Progressive Conservative hold		Swing		-23.80
Source: Elections Newfoundland and Labrador

1975 Newfoundland general election
Party	Candidate	Votes	%	±%
Progressive Conservative	Joseph G. Rousseau	2,561	65.00	+4.16
Liberal	Eric Phillip Chaulk	621	15.76	-15.77
Reform Liberal	Eugene William Canning	434	11.02	+11.02
New Democratic	William James Smeaton	324	8.22	+8.22
Total valid votes		3,940	99.67	–
Total rejected ballots		13	0.33	–
Turnout		3,953	50.39	-42.60
Eligible voters		7,845		
Progressive Conservative hold		Swing		+9.97
Source: Elections Newfoundland and Labrador

1972 Newfoundland general election
Party	Candidate	Votes	%	±%
Progressive Conservative	Joseph G. Rousseau	3,494	60.84	
Liberal	Thomas W. Burgess	1,811	31.53	
Labrador	Gerald Thomas Neary	438	7.63	
Total valid votes		5,743	99.19	–
Total rejected ballots		14	0.81	–
Turnout		5,757	92.99	
Eligible voters		6,191		
Progressive Conservative gain from Liberal		Swing		–
Source: Elections Newfoundland and Labrador

== See also ==
- List of Newfoundland and Labrador provincial electoral districts
- Canadian provincial electoral districts
- Labrador West
