= Graham Letto =

Canadian politician

The Honourable Graham Letto ECNL

Member of the Newfoundland and Labrador House of Assembly for Labrador West
- In office November 30, 2015 – April 16, 2019
- Preceded by: Nick McGrath
- Succeeded by: Jordan Brown

Minister of Municipal Affairs and Environment, Registrar General, Minister Responsible for the MMSB, And Minister Responsible for the office of Climate Change
- In office November 8, 2018 – May 30, 2019
- Preceded by: Andrew Parsons
- Succeeded by: Lisa Dempster

Personal details
- Party: Liberal

Graham Letto is a Canadian politician, who served in the Newfoundland and Labrador House of Assembly from 2015 until 2019. He represented the district of Labrador West as a member of the Newfoundland and Labrador Liberal Party.

Prior to his election to the legislature, Letto served as mayor of Labrador City, Newfoundland and Labrador from 2001 until 2009.

== Background ==
He was born in Forteau and grew up in L'Anse-au-Clair.

== Political career ==
In 1989, Letto sought election to the town council of Labrador City, and was elected. He was also re-elected to the council in 1993 and 1997. Then in 2001, Letto was elected as mayor of Labrador City. During the 2003 Newfoundland and Labrador general election, he ran in the provincial riding of Labrador West as the Progressive Conservative candidate, but was defeated by Randy Collins of the NDP.

On May 24, 2005, Letto ran for the Conservative Party of Canada in the Labrador riding in a by-election. Letto lost, but increased the Conservative vote in the traditional Liberal riding substantially.

On September 27, 2005, Letto was re-elected mayor of Labrador City in the 2005 municipal election. He did not seek a third term during the 2009 municipal elections, and was succeeded by Janice Barnes.

Letto received a Federation of Canadian Municipalities Roll of Honour Award in June 2014.

In August 2015, Letto was nominated as the Liberal candidate in Labrador West for the 2015 provincial election. On November 30, 2015, Letto won the seat, defeating New Democrat and former Wabush Mayor Ron Barron and Progressive Conservative incumbent Nick McGrath.

On November 8, 2018, Letto was appointed Minister of Municipal Affairs and Environment.

In the 2019 provincial election Letto was defeated by NDP candidate Jordan Brown in a major upset.

== Electoral record ==
=== Provincial ===
2019 Newfoundland and Labrador general election
Party	Candidate	Votes	%	±%
New Democratic	Jordan Brown	1,364	42.2	+7.47
Liberal	Graham Letto	1,362	42.1	-1.71
Progressive Conservative	Derick Sharron	509	15.7	-5.76
Total valid votes				
Total rejected ballots				
Turnout				
Eligible voters				

2015 Newfoundland and Labrador general election
Party	Candidate	Votes	%	±%
Liberal	Graham Letto	1,453	43.8	
New Democratic	Ron Barron	1,152	34.7	
Progressive Conservative	Nick McGrath	712	21.5	

2003 Newfoundland and Labrador general election
Party	Candidate	Votes	%	±%
New Democratic	Randy Collins	2,762	55.71	+7.88
Progressive Conservative	Graham Letto	1,142	23.03	+15.93
Labrador Party	Ern Condon	631	12.73	–
Liberal	Doris Sacrey	423	8.53	-36.54
Total valid votes		4,958	99.72	
New Democratic hold		Swing		+22.21
Source: Newfoundland & Labrador 2003

=== Federal ===
Canadian federal by-election, May 24, 2005: Labrador
Party	Candidate	Votes	%	±%	Expenditures
Liberal	Todd Russell	5,438	51.48	-10.75	$53,970.30
Conservative	Graham Letto	3,415	32.33	+16.56	$73,509.62
New Democratic	Frances Fry	1,045	9.89	+0.25	$26,121.42
Independent	Ern Condon	598	5.66	-4.69	$254.00
Green	Jason Crummey	68	0.64	-1.37	$78.45
Total valid votes/Expense limit		10,564	100.0	–	$74,995
Total rejected, declined and unmarked ballots		58	0.55	+0.03	
Turnout		10,622	53.44	+8.62	
Eligible voters		19,876			
Liberal hold		Swing		-13.6	
Called on the death of Lawrence D. O'Brien, December 16, 2004

Newfoundland and Labrador provincial government of Dwight Ball
Cabinet post (1)
Predecessor	Office	Successor
Andrew Parsons	Minister of Municipal Affairs and Environment; November 8, 2018– April 16, 2019	Lisa Dempster
