= Danny Dumaresque =

Canadian politician

President of the Newfoundland and Labrador Liberal Party
- In office 2006–2009
- Preceded by: Tom Lush
- Succeeded by: Judy Morrow

MHA for Eagle River
- In office 1989–1996
- Preceded by: Eugene Hiscock
- Succeeded by: Riding Redistricted

Personal details
- Born: November 6, 1959 (age 66) St. Anthony, Newfoundland and Labrador
- Party: Liberal Party of Newfoundland and Labrador
- Occupation: Businessman

Danny Wade Dumaresque (born November 6, 1959) is a Canadian politician. He represented the riding of Eagle River in the Newfoundland and Labrador House of Assembly from 1989 to 1996 as a member of the Liberal Party. Dumaresque has been a Director of NL Hydro and an outspoken critic of the Muskrat Falls hydro development. Dumaresque is founder of Labrador Gem Seafoods.

In the 1996 election, Dumaresque defeated Yvonne Jones for the Liberal nomination in the redistricted riding of Cartwright-L'Anse au Clair. Jones ran as an independent candidate, however, and defeated Dumaresque in the general election. She later joined the Liberal caucus.

He later served as John Efford's campaign manager in the party's leadership convention in 2001. He subsequently threatened to sue the victorious candidate, Roger Grimes, for libel after Grimes reportedly stated that he "would never be able to sleep any one night in comfort, knowing he had a minister in confidence who had Danny Dumaresque as an advisor to him." Premier Grimes issued and official apology stating there was no basis for his statement and Mr. Dumaresque dropped his suit.

He also served as president of the provincial Liberal Party from 2006 until 2009. He was succeeded in this role by Judy Morrow.

Dumaresque ran as the Liberal candidate in Torngat Mountains in the 2007 election, but narrowly lost to Patty Pottle.

He was also frequently rumoured as a possible candidate for the leadership of the provincial Liberal party in their 2010 leadership election. After he had previously stated that he would not rule it out, on July 29, 2010 he announced he would not run and would instead focus on his business career. Dumaresque has owned and operated seafood processing plants in Quebec and Newfoundland and successfully marketed various seafood products to the international marketplace.

In March 2011, he announced that he was considering running for the Liberals in the 2011 provincial election in the district of Lake Melville, but on August 22, 2011, he was acclaimed as the party's candidate in The Isles of Notre Dame and lost in the general election. He was an unsuccessful candidate in the leadership election to replace Yvonne Jones in August 2011.

On July 2, 2013 Dumaresque announced he was running for the leadership of the provincial Liberal Party in their 2013 election. He was, again, ultimately unsuccessful in his bid to lead the party.

Dumaresque ran for the Liberal nomination in Cartwright-L'Anse au Clair for the 2015 provincial election but lost to Lisa Dempster. He later won a party nomination in Conception Bay East – Bell Island, but lost to the Progressive Conservative incumbent, David Brazil.

== Electoral record ==
2015 Newfoundland and Labrador general election
Party	Candidate	Votes	%
Progressive Conservative	David Brazil	3,463	59.22
Liberal	Danny Dumaresque	1,582	27.05
New Democratic	Bill Kavanagh	803	13.73
Total valid votes		5,848	100.00

2013 Liberal Party of Newfoundland and Labrador leadership election
	Ballot 1				Ballot 2				Ballot 3			
Candidate	Votes	%	Points	%	Votes	%	Points	%	Votes	%	Points	%
Dwight Ball	10,944	45.94%	2,130.05	44.38%	11,306	48.45%	2,257.15	47.02%	12,598	60.64%	2,832.29	59.01%
Paul Antle	6,340	26.61%	1,321.15	27.52%	6,600	28.28%	1,397.86	29.12%	8,178	39.36%	1,967.71	40.99%
Cathy Bennett	5,252	22.05%	1,089.05	22.69%	5,431	23.27%	1,144.99	23.85%				
Danny Dumaresque	670	2.81%	131.69	2.74%								
Jim Bennett	617	2.59%	128.05	2.67%								
Total	23,823	100.00	4,800.00	100.00	23,337	100.00	4,800.00	100.00	20,776	100.00	4,800.00	100.00

2011 Newfoundland and Labrador general election
Party	Candidate	Votes	%	±%
Progressive Conservative	Derrick Dalley	2,764	67.65%	–
Liberal	Danny Dumaresque	1,070	26.19%	
NDP	Tree Walsh	252	6.17%	

2007 Newfoundland and Labrador general election
Party	Candidate	Votes	%	±%
Progressive Conservative	Patty Pottle	680	48.82%	–
Liberal	Danny Dumaresque	604	43.36%	
Labrador Party	Jimmy Tuttauk	109	7.82%	

1996 Newfoundland and Labrador general election
Party	Candidate	Votes	%	±%
Independent	Yvonne Jones	1,665	56.83%	
Liberal	Danny Dumaresque	1,233	42.08%	
Progressive Conservative	Berkley Bursey	42	1.43%	–

1993 Newfoundland and Labrador general election
Party	Candidate	Votes	%	±%
Liberal	Danny Dumaresque	1,578	66.95%	
Progressive Conservative	Michael Kelly	486	20.62%	–
NDP	Jessie Bird	293	12.43%	

1989 Newfoundland and Labrador general election
Party	Candidate	Votes	%	±%
Liberal	Danny Dumaresque	1,540	60.02%	
Progressive Conservative	Reginald Hancock	1,026	39.98%	–

Newfoundland provincial by-election, October 9, 1984 upon the resignation of Peter J. Walsh
Party	Candidate	Votes	%	±%
New Democratic	Peter Fenwick	1,744	40.32	+26.02
Progressive Conservative	Alec Snow	1,684	38.94	-19.91
Liberal	Danny Dumaresque	897	20.74	-6.11
Total valid votes		4,325	99.77	–
Total rejected ballots		10	0.23	–
Turnout		4,335	58.83	-24.09
Eligible voters		7,369		
New Democratic gain from Progressive Conservative		Swing		+22.97
Source: Elections Newfoundland and Labrador
