= Joe Harvey =

Joe Harvey may refer to:

- Joe Harvey (baseball) (born 1992), American baseball pitcher
- Joe Harvey (footballer) (1918–1989), English football player and manager
- Joe Harvey (politician) (c. 1938–2009), Canadian politician
