= Nick McGrath =

Canadian politician

The Honourable Nick McGrath ECNL

Minister of Transportation and Works, Minister Responsible for Labrador Affairs, Minister Responsible for the Government Purchasing Agency, And Minister Responsible for the office of the chief information officer of Newfoundland and Labrador
- In office 9 October 2013 – 29 September 2014
- Preceded by: Paul Davis
- Succeeded by: David Brazil

Member of the Newfoundland and Labrador House of Assembly for Labrador West
- In office 27 October 2011 – 27 November 2015
- Preceded by: Jim Baker
- Succeeded by: Graham Letto

Minister of Service NL, Minister Responsible for the Workplace Health, Safety, And Compensation Commission of Newfoundland and Labrador
- In office 19 October 2012 – 9 October 2013
- Preceded by: Paul Davis
- Succeeded by: Dan Crummell

Minister of Intergovernmental, Aboriginal Affairs, And Minister Responsible for the Voluntary and Non profit Sector of Newfoundland and Labrador
- In office 28 October 2011 – 19 October 2012
- Preceded by: New Office
- Succeeded by: Felix Collins

Personal details
- Born: St. John's, Newfoundland and Labrador
- Party: Progressive Conservative
- Occupation: Businessman

Nick McGrath is a Canadian politician in Newfoundland and Labrador, Canada.

McGrath was elected to the Newfoundland and Labrador House of Assembly in the 2011 provincial election and represented the electoral district of Labrador West. He lost re-election in the 2015 election. He previously served as Minister of Transportation and Works, Minister of Service NL and Minister of Intergovernmental and Aboriginal Affairs. Before entering provincial politics McGrath was a town councillor in Labrador City, President of Combined Councils of Labrador, and a businessman in Labrador West.

== Background ==
McGrath was born and raised in St. John's before moving to the mining area of Labrador West in the 1970s. He has run six businesses in the area and is a longtime volunteer. Prior to his election as MHA he served on the Labrador City Town Council and was President of Combined Council of Labrador.

== Politics ==
In August 2011, McGrath defeated Peter McCormick and Olympic gold medallist Mark Nichols to win the Progressive Conservative nomination in the district of Labrador West. In the October provincial election McGrath was elected as the MHA, winning 51 percent of the popular vote. On 28 October 2011, McGrath was sworn in as the Minister for Intergovernmental and Aboriginal Affairs and Minister Responsible for Labrador Affairs, and the Voluntary and Non-Profit Sector.

On 9 October 2013, McGrath was appointed Minister of Transportation and Works. He resigned as Minister on 29 September 2014, following a report by the Auditor General which indicated McGrath pushed through the cancellation of a multimillion-dollar contract (Humber Valley Paving Ltd) within hours without notifying senior government officials or the premier. Premier Paul Davis stated that he would have asked for McGrath's resignation had he not quit first.

In the 2015 provincial election McGrath placed third after Liberal victor Graham Letto and New Democrat Ron Barron.

In 2017, McGrath was elected to the Labrador City town council.

In October 2020, McGrath was chosen as the Progressive Conservative candidate for Labrador West in the province's next election. He was defeated by incumbent NDP MHA Jordan Brown; placing third in the 2021 election. In the 2021 municipal election, McGrath was defeated for re-election. In the 2025 mayoral election, McGrath was defeated by former NDP MHA Jordan Brown.

== Electoral record ==
2025 Labrador City mayoral election

| Candidate | Votes | % |
|---|---|---|
| Jordan Brown | 1,080 | 51.85 |
| Mitchell Marsh | 732 | 35.14 |
| Nick McGrath | 214 | 10.27 |
| Matt Fowler | 57 | 2.74 |

=== 2021 ===
2021 Newfoundland and Labrador general election: Labrador West
| Party | Candidate | Votes | % | ±% |
|---|---|---|---|---|
| New Democratic | Jordan Brown | 1,359 | 50.04 | +7.87 |
| Liberal | Wayne Button | 780 | 28.72 | -13.38 |
| Progressive Conservative | Nick McGrath | 577 | 21.24 | +5.51 |
| Total valid votes | | 2,716 | 99.89 | |
| Total rejected ballots | | 3 | 0.11 | |
| Turnout | | 2,719 | 43.23 | |
| Eligible voters | | 6,289 | | |
| New Democratic hold | | Swing | | +10.63 |
Source(s) "Officially Nominated Candidates General Election 2021" (PDF). Elections Newfoundland and Labrador. "NL Election 2021 (Unofficial Results)".

=== 2015 ===
Labrador West - 2015 Newfoundland and Labrador general election
| Party | Candidate | Votes | % | ±% |
|---|---|---|---|---|
| Liberal | Graham Letto | 1,453 | 43.8 | +34.02 |
| NDP | Ron Barron | 1,152 | 34.7 | +2.06 |
| Progressive Conservative | Nick McGrath | 712 | 21.5 | -29.47 |

=== 2011 ===
Labrador West - 2011 Newfoundland and Labrador general election
| Party | Candidate | Votes | % | ±% |
|---|---|---|---|---|
| Progressive Conservative | Nick McGrath | 1,844 | 50.97 | +0.18 |
| NDP | Tom Harris | 1,181 | 32.64 | -9.95 |
| Liberal | Karen Oldford | 593 | 16.39 | +9.78 |
