= James J. Hussey =

Canadian politician

Member of the Newfoundland and Labrador House of Assembly for Port de Grave
- In office 1971–1972
- Preceded by: Eric Dawe
- Succeeded by: George M. Wilson

Personal details
- Born: November 27, 1917 Port de Grave, Newfoundland
- Died: July 31, 2007 (aged 89) St. John's, Newfoundland and Labrador, Canada
- Party: Liberal Party of Newfoundland and Labrador

James John Hussey (November 27, 1917 – July 31, 2007) was a Canadian politician who was elected to the Newfoundland and Labrador House of Assembly in the 1971 provincial election. He represented the electoral district of Port de Grave as a member of the Liberal Party of Newfoundland and Labrador.

Hussey was born in Port de Grave in 1917 to Abraham and Phoebe (née Tucker) Hussey. He received primary schooling in Port de Grave. Hussey married Annie Doris Hill in 1942 and had eight children. He later resided in St. John's and was a member of the Royal Yacht Club of Newfoundland.
