= Jordan Brown (Newfoundland and Labrador politician) =

Canadian politician

His Worship Jordan Brown
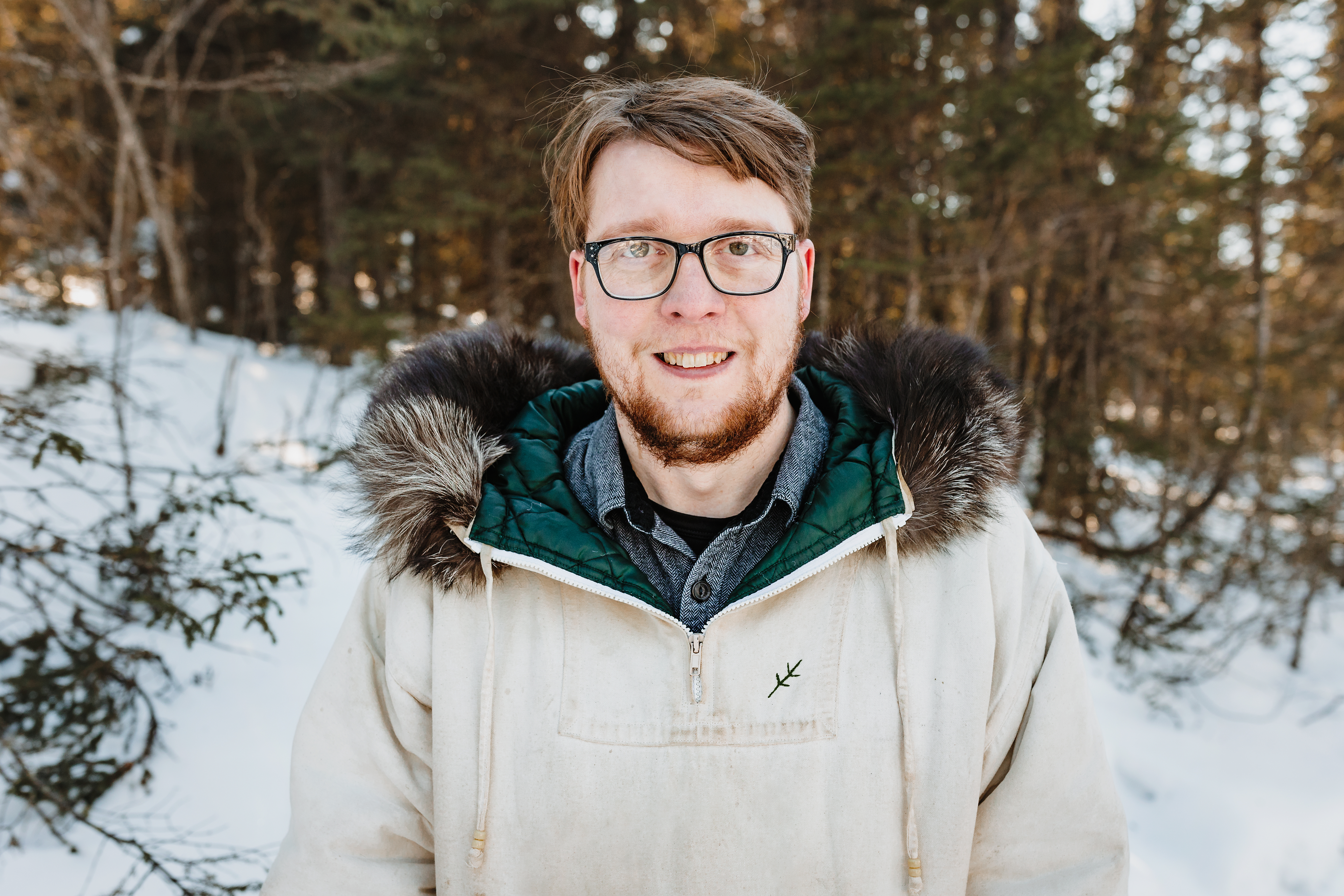

Mayor of Labrador City
- Incumbent
- Assumed office October 2, 2025
- Preceded by: Belinda Adams

House Leader of the Newfoundland and Labrador New Democratic Party
- In office October 19, 2021 – August 1, 2025
- Leader: Alison Coffin and Jim Dinn

Member of the Newfoundland and Labrador House of Assembly for Labrador West
- In office May 16, 2019 – August 1, 2025
- Preceded by: Graham Letto
- Succeeded by: Joseph Power

Personal details
- Born: September 14, 1989 (age 37)
- Party: Independent (municipal); New Democratic (provincial)
- Education: College of the North Atlantic

Jordan Brown (born September 14, 1989) is a Canadian politician who has served as the mayor of Labrador City since 2025. He was previously elected to the Newfoundland and Labrador House of Assembly in the 2019 Newfoundland and Labrador general election. He represented the electoral district of Labrador West as a member of the Newfoundland and Labrador New Democratic Party until 2025. He was re-elected in the 2021 provincial election.

== Early life and career ==
Brown trained as a welder in Happy Valley-Goose Bay and returned to Labrador City to work. In 2013 he helped restart the local Heritage Society. In 2014, he led a successful year-long campaign to have the Labrador flag recognized as the symbol of Labrador and flown at the land border crossings in Labrador and at government buildings. In 2017, Brown unsuccessfully sought election to the Labrador City town council.

== Political career ==
In 2022, Brown criticized the provincial government's claim that the Trans-Labrador Highway had been completed. He argued that it isn't finished until a road reaches Labrador's north coast as far as Nain. In 2023, Brown criticized the diversion of obstetrical services from Happy Valley-Goose Bay to Labrador City, stating that Labrador City's hospital is too understaffed to provide for the central and northern regions of Labrador.

Brown has called for a provincial ban on scab workers.

In 2023, Brown criticized the Bloc Québécois for having a map of the Newfoundland and Labrador–Quebec border with Quebec having control of Labrador.

On May 16, 2025, Brown announced that he will not be seeking re-election.

Brown vacated his seat on August 1, 2025.

On August 31, 2025, Brown announced that he would be running for Mayor of Labrador City. He won the election with 1,080 total votes.

== Awards and recognition ==
In 2017, Brown was awarded the Labradorians of Distinction Medal.

== Electoral history ==
2025 Labrador City mayoral election

Candidate	Votes	%
Jordan Brown	1,080	51.85
Mitchell Marsh	732	35.14
Nick McGrath	214	10.27
Matt Fowler	57	2.74

Labrador West - 2021 Newfoundland and Labrador general election
Party	Candidate	Votes	%	±%
New Democratic	Jordan Brown	1,359	50.0	+7.8
Liberal	Wayne Button	780	28.7	-13.4
Progressive Conservative	Nick McGrath	577	21.3	+5.6
Total valid votes		2,716		
Total rejected ballots				
Turnout				
Eligible voters				

Labrador West - 2019 Newfoundland and Labrador general election
Party	Candidate	Votes	%	±%
New Democratic	Jordan Brown	1,364	42.2	+7.47
Liberal	Graham Letto	1,362	42.1	-1.71
Progressive Conservative	Derick Sharron	509	15.7	-5.76
Total valid votes				
Total rejected ballots				
Turnout				
Eligible voters				

2017 Labrador City municipal election	Vote	%
Wayne Button (elected mayor)	1,186	10.22
Fabian Benoit	1,030	8.87
Junior Humphries (X)	998	8.60
Nick McGrath	920	7.92
John Penney (X)	883	7.61
Kenneth Lawlor	863	7.43
Richard Fahey	783	6.74
Peter Pike	758	6.53
Edward Conway (X)	744	6.41
Corinna Wentzell	684	5.89
Jamie-Lynn Patterson	655	5.64
Toby Leon	629	5.42
Clarence Rogers (X)	584	5.03
Jordan Brown	515	3.44
Christopher Lacey (X)	377	3.25
