= Joseph Power (politician) =

Canadian politician

Joseph Power MHA

Member of the Newfoundland and Labrador House of Assembly for Labrador West
- Incumbent
- Assumed office October 14, 2025
- Preceded by: Jordan Brown

Personal details
- Party: Progressive Conservative
- Website: www.pcnl.ca/joepower

Joseph (Joe) Leonard Power is a Canadian politician from the Progressive Conservative Party of Newfoundland and Labrador. In the 2025 Newfoundland and Labrador general election he was elected to the Newfoundland and Labrador House of Assembly in Labrador West.

On September 17, 2026, Power voted to approve the Churchill Falls Definitive Cooperation and Implementation Agreement (DCIA) in the House of Assembly along with the PC caucus.

Power was the chief of the Labrador City fire department and president of the Newfoundland and Labrador Association of Fire Services.

== Election results ==
2025 Newfoundland and Labrador general election: Labrador West
Party	Candidate	Votes	%	±%
Progressive Conservative	Joseph Power	1,639	47.27	+26.03
Liberal	Todd Seward	1,364	39.34	+10.62
New Democratic	Shazia Razi	464	13.38	-36.65
Total valid votes		3,467		
Total rejected ballots				
Turnout				
Eligible voters				
Progressive Conservative gain from New Democratic		Swing		+31.34
