= Jim Baker (politician) =

Canadian politician

Member of the Newfoundland and Labrador House of Assembly for Labrador West
- In office March 2007 – September 19, 2011
- Preceded by: Randy Collins
- Succeeded by: Nick McGrath

Personal details
- Born: Marystown, Newfoundland and Labrador
- Party: Progressive Conservative

Jim Baker is a Canadian politician from Newfoundland and Labrador, Canada.

Baker represented the district of Labrador West in the Newfoundland and Labrador House of Assembly as a member of the Progressive Conservative Party. Baker was first elected in a 2007 by-election, and was re-elected later that year in the provincial election. Baker did not run for re-election in the 2011 provincial election.

== Election results ==
2007 Newfoundland and Labrador general election
| Party | Candidate | Votes | % | ±% |
|---|---|---|---|---|
| Progressive Conservative | Jim Baker | 2204 | 50.8% | – |
| NDP | Darrel J. Brenton | 1848 | 41.59% | |
| Liberal | Karen Oldford | 287 | 6.61% | |

2007 Labrador West provincial by-election Resignation of Randy Collins
| Party | Candidate | Votes | % | +/- |
|---|---|---|---|---|
| Progressive Conservative | Jim Baker | 1,666 | 41.6 | |
| NDP | Darrel Brenton | 1,240 | 31.0 | |
| Labrador Party | Ron Barron | 670 | 16.7 | |
| Liberal | Karen Oldford | 427 | 10.7 | |
