= Ida Reid =

Canadian politician

Member of the Newfoundland and Labrador House of Assembly for Twillingate
- In office 1982–1985
- Preceded by: Bill Rowe
- Succeeded by: Walter C. Carter

Personal details
- Party: Progressive Conservative Party of Newfoundland and Labrador

Ida M. Reid is a former Canadian politician who was elected to the Newfoundland and Labrador House of Assembly in the 1982 general election. She represented the electoral district of Twillingate as a member of the Progressive Conservative Party of Newfoundland and Labrador. She lived in Twillingate.
