= Derrick Hancock =

Canadian politician

Member of the Newfoundland and Labrador House of Assembly for St. Mary's-The Capes
- In office 1979–1982
- Preceded by: Walter C. Carter
- Succeeded by: Loyola Hearn

Personal details
- Born: September 30, 1948 (age 77) Pool's Cove, Dominion of Newfoundland
- Party: Liberal Party of Newfoundland and Labrador

Derrick Gerald Hancock (born September 30, 1948) is a former Canadian politician who was elected to the Newfoundland and Labrador House of Assembly in the 1979 by-election. He represented the electoral district of St. Mary's-The Capes as a member of the Liberal Party of Newfoundland and Labrador.

Hanccock was born in Pool's Cove, Newfoundland to Allan and Catherine (née Williams) Hancock and attended Booth Memorial High School in St. John's. He married Carla O'Keefe in 1972 with whom he had three children. Hancock resided in Mount Carmel, Newfoundland.
