= Ian Strachan (Newfoundland and Labrador politician) =

Canadian politician (1940–2024)

MHA for Eagle River
- In office 1975–1979
- Succeeded by: Eugene Hiscock

Personal details
- Born: 1 November 1940 Aberdeen, Scotland
- Died: 3 March 2024 (aged 83) Chateauguay, Quebec, Canada
- Party: Liberal Party of Newfoundland and Labrador
- Spouse: Merrill Corbin (m. 1975)
- Children: 4
- Occupation: food technologist

Ian Strachan (1 November 1940 – 3 March 2024) was a Canadian politician. He represented the electoral district of Eagle River in the Newfoundland and Labrador House of Assembly from 1975 to 1979. He was a member of the Liberal Party. He was born at Aberdeen, Scotland.

Strachan previously worked as a Community Development Worker for Memorial University of Newfoundland Extension Services in Nain. He subsequently served as independent facilitator chair of the Combined Councils of Labrador.

Strachan married Merrill Gay Lowes Corbin in 1975. He has a daughter, Ella Edith Wallace, who serves as deputy mayor of Happy Valley-Goose Bay She also ran federally in 2025 for the Conservatives in Labrador As well as 3 other daughters Iona, Kate and Isla. He died on March 3, 2024, at the age of 83.
