= Randy Collins =

Canadian politician

Randy Collins MHA

Member of the Newfoundland and Labrador House of Assembly for Labrador West
- In office 1999–2007
- Preceded by: Perry Canning
- Succeeded by: Jim Baker

Personal details
- Born: Gambo, Newfoundland and Labrador, Canada
- Party: New Democratic Party

Randy Collins is a Canadian politician and a former New Democratic Party (NDP) member of the Newfoundland and Labrador House of Assembly. He represented the Labrador West riding until his resignation in early 2007 due to corruption charges.

== Background ==
Randy Collins was born in Gambo, Newfoundland and Labrador and graduated from Smallwood Academy. He moved to Labrador City in 1972. He was employed by the Iron Ore Company of Canada for 25 years and has an interprovincial millwright certificate. He was elected to the executive of the United Steelworkers of America (USWA) Local 5795 from 1978 to 1991, and was president from 1985 to 1991. In 1991, Collins was elected as staff representative to the USWA.

He was first elected to the legislature in the 1999 election, and was re-elected in 2003. He had previously been the federal NDP candidate in Labrador in the 1997 federal election, where he finished a relatively close second.

== Controversy ==
In September 2009, he pleaded guilty to charges of fraud over $5,000 and fraud on the government. At his sentencing hearing in December 2009, he said "What I did was wrong." He was sentenced to 21 months in prison.
