= Labrador Party =

Canadian provincial political party

The Labrador Party (or New Labrador Party) was the name of two political parties in Newfoundland advocating the interests of the region of Labrador, Canada.

== New Labrador Party (1969–1975) ==
New Labrador Party
- Provincial political party
- Founded: 1969
- Dissolved: 1975
- Ideology: Labrador interests

The party was founded in 1969 by Tom Burgess, a disaffected former Liberal MHA who crossed the floor to become an independent when he was passed over for a cabinet seat. He was re-elected to the Newfoundland and Labrador House of Assembly from Labrador West in the 1971 provincial election under the New Labrador Party banner. The election returned a hung parliament. Burgess initially indicated that he would support the opposition Progressive Conservative Party's bid to form a government and unseat Premier Joey Smallwood's Liberals. However, days after Conservative leader Frank Moores was sworn in as Premier, Burgess was enticed to rejoin the Liberals under the false promise that he would succeed Joey Smallwood as Liberal leader and Premier. Burgess joined the Liberals on January 31, 1972 but was defeated in the party's leadership convention. His defection and that of a Progressive Conservative MHA was enough to bring down the Moores government and force an election; however, Burgess lost his seat and Moores formed a majority Conservative government.

Mike Martin won a seat for the party in a 1972 by-election in Labrador South. However, the MHA retired prior to the 1975 election. Afterward, the party dissolved.

Election results
| Election year | No. of overall votes | % of overall total | % of total in Labrador | No. of candidates who ran | No. of seats won | +/− | Government |
|---|---|---|---|---|---|---|---|
| 1971 | 5,595 | 2.38 | 45.00 | 3 / 42 | 1 / 42 | Steady | Third Party |
| 1972 | 2,548 | 1.21 | 22.58 | 3 / 42 | 0 / 42 | ▼1 | No seats |

Newfoundland and Labrador provincial by-election, August 31, 1972 Void election
| Party | Candidate | Votes | % | ±% |
|---|---|---|---|---|
| Labrador | Michael S. Martin | 1,057 | 50.65 | +0.68 |
| Liberal | Josiah Harvey | 899 | 43.05 | -6.98 |
| Progressive Conservative | Edward F. Kearsey | 132 | 6.30 | – |
| Total valid votes | | 2,088 | 99.24 | – |
| Total rejected ballots | | 16 | 0.76 | – |
| Turnout | | 2,104 | 94.01 | +10.68 |
| Eligible voters | | 2,238 | | |
| Labrador gain from Liberal | | Swing | | +3.83 |
Source: Elections Newfoundland & Labrador

== Second Labrador Party ==
Labrador Party
- Provincial political party
- Founded: 2003
- Dissolved: 2007
- Ideology: Labrador interests
- Colours: White, green

Feelings among Labradorians that the region has been neglected by the Newfoundland and Labrador government led to the party's refounding in 2003 with Ern Condon as leader. The party nominated candidates in each of Labrador's four ridings in that year's election, with the hope of holding the balance of power in the House of Assembly and being able to trade political support for more services and attention to Labrador.

The party failed to win any seats, though Brandon Pardy came in second in Lake Melville with 32% of the vote. The party received 12% of the vote in Labrador West, 8% in Cartwright-L'Anse au Clair, and 5% in Torngat Mountains.

The party chose Ron Barron, the Deputy Mayor of Wabush, as the party leader in preparation for the next provincial election. In a by-election for the riding of Labrador West held on March 13, 2007, Labrador Party candidate Ron Barron came in third, winning 670 of a total of just over 4000 votes cast.

In the fall election in 2007, the Labrador Party decided not to run candidates in three of Labrador's four ridings so the vote between parties opposed to the Progressive Conservatives would not get split. Jimmy Tuttauk, the party's only candidate, earned almost 8% of the vote in the district of Torngat Mountains.

Election results
| Election year | Leader | No. of overall votes | % of overall total | % of total in Labrador | No. of candidates who ran | No. of seats won | +/− | Government |
|---|---|---|---|---|---|---|---|---|
| 2003 | Ern Condon | 2,391 | 0.86 | 17.85 | 4 / 48 | 0 / 48 | Steady | No seats |
| 2007 | Ron Barron | 109 | 0.03 | 0.88 | 1 / 48 | 0 / 48 | Steady | No seats |

Newfoundland and Labrador provincial by-election, March 13, 2007 upon the resignation of Randy Collins
| Party | Candidate | Votes | % | ±% |
|---|---|---|---|---|
| Progressive Conservative | Jim Baker | 1,666 | 41.62 | +18.59 |
| New Democratic | Darrel J. Brenton | 1,240 | 30.97 | -24.74 |
| Labrador | Ron Barron | 670 | 16.74 | +4.01 |
| Liberal | Karen Oldford | 427 | 10.67 | +2.14 |
| Total valid votes | | 4,003 | 99.80 | – |
| Total rejected ballots | | 8 | 0.20 | – |
| Turnout | | 4,011 | 50.09 | -10.90 |
| Eligible voters | | 8,008 | | |
| Progressive Conservative gain from New Democratic | | Swing | | +21.67 |
Source: Elections Newfoundland & Labrador

== Leaders ==
- Tom Burgess (1969–1972)
- Ern Condon (2003–2004)
- Ron Barron (2004–2007)

== See also ==
- List of political parties in Newfoundland and Labrador
- 2007 Labrador West provincial by-election
