= Herbert Gillett =

Canadian politician

Herbert William Clarke Gillett (November 9, 1915 – 1995) was a merchant and politician in Newfoundland. He represented Twillingate in the Newfoundland House of Assembly from 1972 to 1975.

The son of John Gillett and Lucy Clarke, Gillett was born in Twillingate and was educated at Durrell Academy, Prince of Wales College and Memorial University College. In 1936, he entered the family business. In 1955, he established his own wholesale distribution and shipping company at Twillingate. Gillett also served as chair of the Notre Dame Bay Hospital Authority.

In 1941, he married Edna Ashbourne.

He was elected to the Newfoundland assembly in 1972, serving a single term. Gillett served as acting mayor of Twillingate from 1975 to 1977 and then was elected as mayor, serving until 1981.

Gillett Place in Mount Pearl was named in his honour.
