= Everett Osmond =

Canadian politician

MHA for St. Barbe
- In office 1982–1985
- Preceded by: Trevor Bennett
- Succeeded by: Chuck Furey

Personal details
- Born: July 13, 1936
- Died: March 13, 2015 (aged 78) Corner Brook, Newfoundland
- Party: Progressive Conservative Party of Newfoundland and Labrador
- Occupation: Businessman

Everett Kevin Osmond (July 13, 1936 – March 13, 2015) was a business owner and politician in Newfoundland. He represented St. Barbe in the Newfoundland House of Assembly from 1982 to 1985.

With a partner, Osmond operated a restaurant and lounge in the town of Woody Point. He also served as the town mayor. He was elected to the Newfoundland assembly in 1982 as a Progressive Conservative. He married Blanche Burden.
