= Peter Fenwick (politician) =

Canadian politician

Peter Fenwick (born July 18, 1944) is a Canadian politician. He is a former leader of the Newfoundland and Labrador New Democratic Party.

Fenwick was born in St. Thomas, Ontario to Digby and Benoit Fenwick of Montreal and Stanbridge East. He and his wife Jennifer moved to Cape St George, Newfoundland in 1968.

He was a community college teacher when he was acclaimed provincial NDP leader at the party's convention on November 8, 1981.

Fenwick was first elected to the Newfoundland and Labrador House of Assembly in a 1984 by-election in Menihek, Labrador. He was the first member of the party to be elected to a seat in the House of Assembly. He was re-elected in 1985. He stepped down as leader in 1989 and did not stand for re-election to the House of Assembly in that year's election. While leader of the party in 1986, he was arrested along with union representatives who participated in a strike by the Newfoundland Association of Public Employees (NAPE).

In the 2000 federal election, Fenwick ran in the federal riding of Burin—St. George's for the Canadian Alliance Party, the predecessor of the Conservative Party, and came in fourth out five candidates.

Fenwick has since become a high-profile journalist, columnist, and commentator.

Fenwick opened, Inn at the Cape, a B&B in Cape St. George in 2002, and in 2006, became the president of the Newfoundland and Labrador B&B Association, a position he held until October 2009.

Fenwick became the mayor of the Town of Cape St. George in September 2005 and was acclaimed to the position in September 2009. During his term as Mayor he served as the chair of the Southwest Coast Joint Municipal Council.

== Electoral record ==
2000 Canadian federal election
Party	Candidate	Votes
Liberal	Bill Matthews	14,603
Independent	Sam Synard	7,891
Progressive Conservative	Fred Pottle	5,799
Alliance	Peter Fenwick	1,511
New Democratic	David Sullivan	924

1985 Newfoundland general election
Party	Candidate	Votes	%	±%
New Democratic	Peter Fenwick	2,841	49.41	+9.09
Progressive Conservative	Alec Snow	2,610	45.39	+6.45
Liberal	Andrew Spracklin	299	5.20	-15.54
Total valid votes		5,750	99.71	–
Total rejected ballots		17	0.29	–
Turnout		5,767	90.82	+31.99
Eligible voters		6,350		
New Democratic hold		Swing		+7.77
Source: Elections Newfoundland and Labrador

Newfoundland provincial by-election, October 9, 1984 upon the resignation of Peter J. Walsh
Party	Candidate	Votes	%	±%
New Democratic	Peter Fenwick	1,744	40.32	+26.02
Progressive Conservative	Alec Snow	1,684	38.94	-19.91
Liberal	Danny Dumaresque	897	20.74	-6.11
Total valid votes		4,325	99.77	–
Total rejected ballots		10	0.23	–
Turnout		4,335	58.83	-24.09
Eligible voters		7,369		
New Democratic gain from Progressive Conservative		Swing		+22.97
Source: Elections Newfoundland and Labrador
