= Rupert Bartlett =

Canadian lawyer, judge and politician (1921–2000)

The Honourable Rupert Bartlett QC

Member of the Newfoundland House of Assembly for Trinity South
- In office October 28, 1971 – March 24, 1972
- Preceded by: Uriah Strickland
- Succeeded by: James Reid

Personal details
- Born: Rupert Wilfred Bartlett; January 23, 1921 St. John's, Newfoundland
- Died: December 31, 2000 (aged 79) St. John's, Newfoundland, Canada
- Party: Liberal
- Spouse: Marion Wright
- Children: 2
- Relatives: Robert Bartlett (uncle); John Bartlett (greatuncle)
- Education: Prince of Wales College; Memorial University
- Occupation: Lawyer

Rupert Wilfred Bartlett (January 23, 1921 – December 31, 2000) was a lawyer, judge and politician in Newfoundland. He represented Trinity South in the Newfoundland House of Assembly from 1971 to 1972.

The son of Lewis G. Bartlett and Clara Thompson, he was born in St. John's and was educated at Prince of Wales College and Memorial University. He took part in five Arctic expeditions led by Robert Bartlett. Bartlett was called to the Newfoundland bar in 1944; he was named Queen's Counsel in 1963. From 1969 to 1974, he was president of the Law Society of Newfoundland. Bartlett was named to the Supreme Court of Newfoundland in 1974.

He was elected to the Newfoundland assembly in 1971.

Bartlett died at St. Patrick's Mercy Home in St. John's at the age of 79.
