= Fintan Aylward =

Canadian jurist and politician (1928–2021)

MHA for Placentia East
- In office 1972–1975
- Preceded by: Joey Smallwood
- Succeeded by: William G. Patterson

Personal details
- Born: March 11, 1928 St. Lawrence, Newfoundland
- Died: June 29, 2021 (aged 93) St. John's, Newfoundland and Labrador
- Party: Progressive Conservative Party of Newfoundland and Labrador
- Occupation: Lawyer, judge

Fintan J. Aylward (March 11, 1928 – June 29, 2021) was a politician in Newfoundland and Labrador. He represented Placentia East in the Newfoundland House of Assembly from 1972 to 1975. He was a lawyer and judge. Aylward died in St. John's in 2021 at the age of 93.
