= Harold Piercey =

Canadian educator and politician

Harold Piercey (born 1935) is an educator and former politician in Newfoundland. He represented Hermitage in the Newfoundland House of Assembly from 1971 to 1972.

He was born in Pass Island. He taught high school for 34 years, serving 15 as principal. Piercey and his wife Susie, who settled in Milltown, had three children.
