= Michael S. Martin (politician) =

Canadian politician

Michael Martin

MHA for Labrador South
- In office 1972–1975
- Preceded by: Josiah Harvey

Personal details
- Born: 1938 (age 87–88) Cartwright, Dominion of Newfoundland
- Party: New Labrador Party
- Occupation: civil servant, journalist

Michael Solomon Martin (born 1938) is a former Canadian politician. He represented the electoral district of Labrador South in the Newfoundland and Labrador House of Assembly from 1972 to 1975. He was a member of the New Labrador Party. He was born at Cartwright. Martin served in the Canadian Armed Forces where he served four missions as a United Nations peacekeeper. Martin is known for designing the unofficial Flag of Labrador in 1974. He also designed the Labrador Tartan.
