= George M. Wilson =

Canadian politician

Member of the Newfoundland and Labrador House of Assembly for Port de Grave
- In office 1972–1975
- Preceded by: Eric Dawe
- Succeeded by: Eric Dawe

Personal details
- Born: August 7, 1913 South River, Newfoundland
- Party: Progressive Conservative
- Spouse: Muriel Jane Babcock
- Occupation: Businessman

George Maxwell Wilson (August 7, 1913 – ? 1990) was a businessman and politician in Newfoundland. He represented Port de Grave in the Newfoundland House of Assembly from 1972 to 1975.

The son of William Wilson and Emily Stevens, he was born in South River and was educated there. He established a hardware, lumbering and construction company in Clarke's Beach. He served on the town council and also was town mayor.

In 1938, he married Muriel Jane Babcock.

Wilson was elected to the Newfoundland assembly in 1972 but was defeated when he ran for reelection in 1975.
