= Joseph G. Rousseau =

Canadian politician

Joseph G. "Joe" Rousseau (July 15, 1935 – before 1995) was an educator and politician in Newfoundland. He represented Labrador West and then Menihek in the Newfoundland House of Assembly from 1972 to 1979.

The son of Joseph A. Rousseau and Genevieve Boulos, he was born in Corner Brook and was educated there, in St. John's, at St. Patrick's College in Ottawa, at Saint Francis Xavier University and at the University of Alberta. Rousseau taught at Curling, Corner Brook and Wabush, later serving as principal in Wabush. He married Rose Lynn Matthews. Rousseau also served on the executive of the Newfoundland Teachers' Association.

He was first elected to the Newfoundland assembly in 1972. He served in the provincial cabinet as Minister of Rehabilitation and Recreation, Minister of Manpower and Industrial Relations, Minister of Public Works and Services, Minister of Transportation and Communication and Minister of Forestry and Agriculture. He left the assembly in 1979 and returned to teaching.
