= Randy W. Collins =

Canadian politician

Randell Warren "Randy" Collins (born May 11, 1946) is a pharmacist and politician in Newfoundland. He represented Port de Grave in the Newfoundland House of Assembly from 1979 to 1985.

The son of Lester Gordon Collins and Phyllis Gwendolyn Norman, he was born in St. John's and was educated at Gander Academy and the College of Trades and Technology. Collins was a coach in the Newfoundland Hockey Association.

He was elected to the Newfoundland assembly in 1979 and reelected in 1982. Collins was defeated by John Efford when he ran for re-election in 1985.

In 2009, he received the Bowl of Hygieia award for Newfoundland.
