= Don Stewart (Newfoundland politician) =

Canadian politician

Donald Stewart (born 1946) is a business owner and politician in Newfoundland. He represented Fortune-Hermitage in the Newfoundland House of Assembly from 1979 to 1985.

Stewart was born in Harbour Breton and was educated there and at the College of Trades and Technology. He married Patricia Eddy. Stewart operated his own business and was also co-owner of a motel. He was chairman for The Coaster and The Foghorn newspapers. Stewart was a member of the town council for Harbour Breton, also serving as deputy mayor and later as mayor.

Stewart was elected to the Newfoundland assembly in 1979 and was reelected in 1982. He was defeated when he ran for reelection in 1985.
