= Joe Harvey (politician) =

Canadian politician (c. 1938-2009)

Member of the Newfoundland and Labrador House of Assembly for Labrador South
- In office 1971–1972
- Preceded by: Gerald I. Hill
- Succeeded by: Michael S. Martin

Personal details
- Born: c. 1938
- Died: December 9, 2009 (aged 71) St. John's, Newfoundland and Labrador, Canada
- Party: Liberal Party of Newfoundland and Labrador
- Spouse: Sonia Neary (m. 1959)
- Children: 2

Joseph Boyd Harvey (c. 1938 – December 6, 2009) was a Canadian politician who was elected to the Newfoundland and Labrador House of Assembly in the 1971 provincial election. He represented the electoral district of Labrador South as a member of the Liberal Party of Newfoundland and Labrador. He served as President of the Wabush Liberal Association.

Harvey was from Bell Island and worked for Memorial University of Newfoundland in the department of extension. He worked in communications. Harvey married Sonia Neary and had two children. He died in 2009 at the age of 71 in St. John's.
