= Don Hollett =

Canadian politician

MHA for Trinity North
- In office 1979–1982
- Preceded by: Patrick Canning
- Succeeded by: Glenn Tobin

Personal details
- Born: December 28, 1935 Burin, Dominion of Newfoundland
- Died: April 28, 2020 (aged 84)
- Party: Liberal Party of Newfoundland and Labrador

Donald Colin Hollett (December 28, 1935 – April 28, 2020) was a Canadian politician. He represented the electoral district of Burin-Placentia West in the Newfoundland and Labrador House of Assembly from 1979 to 1982. He was a member of the Liberal Party of Newfoundland and Labrador.
