= Ray Baird =

Canadian politician (1930–2020)

MHA for Humber West
- In office 1979–1989
- Preceded by: Frank Moores
- Succeeded by: Paul Dicks

Personal details
- Born: August 23, 1930 St. John's, Dominion of Newfoundland
- Died: December 6, 2020 (aged 90) Corner Brook, Newfoundland and Labrador
- Party: Progressive Conservative Party of Newfoundland and Labrador

Raymond Joseph Baird (August 23, 1930 – December 6, 2020) was a politician in Newfoundland and Labrador. He represented Humber West in the Newfoundland House of Assembly from 1979 to 1989. He was an entrepreneur in Corner Brook and played a large role in many community organizations, including sport and service organizations.

Ray's adult work life began with CNT in pre confederation Newfoundland. Upon receiving the requisite training he headed for Toronto. En route he travelled by NFLD railway and by ship to eventually land in Point Claire, QC some several days later.
