= Eugene Hiscock =

Canadian politician

MHA for Eagle River
- In office 1979–1989
- Preceded by: Ian Strachan
- Succeeded by: Danny Dumaresque

Personal details
- Born: June 27, 1950 (age 75) Chamberlains, Newfoundland and Labrador
- Party: Liberal Party of Newfoundland and Labrador

Eugene Ronald Hiscock (born June 27, 1950) was a Canadian politician. He represented the electoral district of Eagle River in the Newfoundland and Labrador House of Assembly from 1979 to 1989. He was a member of the Liberal Party. He was born at Chamberlains, Newfoundland.
