= Melvin Woodward =

Canadian politician

Melvin Woodward (August 23, 1933 – March 16, 2015) was an entrepreneur and politician in Newfoundland. He represented Labrador North in the Newfoundland House of Assembly from 1971 to 1975. Founder of the Woodward Group of Companies, he was considered one of Labrador's most successful businessmen.

The son of Joseph Woodward and Jennie Brewer-Scanlon, he was born in North Boat Harbour and was educated there and in Cook's Harbour. Woodward married Sybil Coles. In 1957, he moved to Goose Bay to work at the United States Air Force base. He set up his own fuel delivery business there, also becoming involved in transportation, construction and automobile sales in the area. He was a director for the Bank of Canada, a founding member and president of the Labrador North Chamber of Commerce, a member of the board of regents for Memorial University, chair of the St. John's Port Corporation and chair for the Enterprise Development Board for Industry, Trade and Commerce. In 2001, he was named to the Newfoundland and Labrador Business Hall of Fame.

Woodward was elected to the Newfoundland assembly in 1971 and 1972. He served briefly in the Newfoundland cabinet as Minister of Labrador Affairs. He was defeated in bids for reelection in 1975 and 1979.

He died at home in Happy Valley-Goose Bay at the age of 81.
