= Labrador West =

Region in Newfoundland and Labrador, Canada

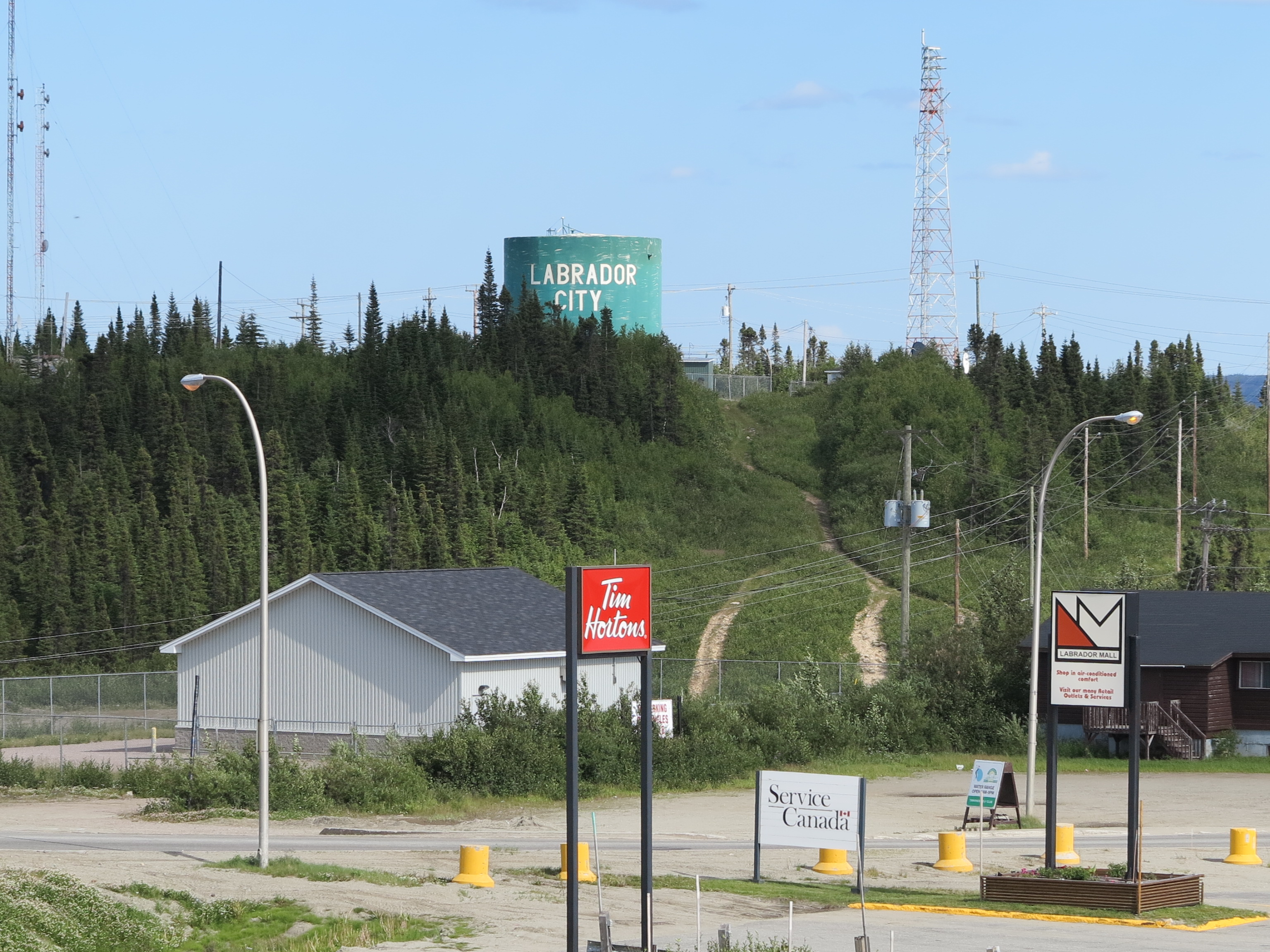
Labrador City

Labrador West (2013 pop.: 10,319) refers to a region in western Labrador in the Canadian province of Newfoundland and Labrador containing the twin towns of Labrador City and Wabush. The area is located in the southwest corner of Labrador, near the Quebec border and has been described as "a dichotomy of pristine wilderness and industrial development."

The region's livelihood is based on iron ore mining which can be traced to the 1950s when the Iron Ore Company of Canada constructed Labrador City and the Quebec North Shore and Labrador Railway to haul ore to the port of Sept-Îles, Quebec, 575 km to the south. The adjacent Wabush Mines were established in the 1960s by another company, along with the town of Wabush and the Wabush Lake Railway which connects to the QNSL.

In the early 1980s, population in Labrador West peaked at about 14,000 residents. At this time, the previously privately owned towns of Labrador City and Wabush became official municipalities, each with its own elected officials, governance and tax schemes. Today, the twin towns have a combined population of 9,126 (as of 2016).

Labrador West is also home to tremendous wilderness opportunities in a pristine state with little human settlement or development. Wilderness recreational opportunities in the Labrador West area include camping, fishing, hunting Moose, Arctic hare and ptarmigan), hiking, boating, skiing, and snowmobiling.

Scheduled passenger airline service is available via the Wabush Airport.

The nearest population centres to Labrador West are the Quebec town of Fermont, 30 km away, the ports of Sept-Îles and Baie-Comeau to the south, and the military town of Happy Valley-Goose Bay to the east.
