= Bill Rowe =

Canadian politician (born 1942)

The Honourable Bill Rowe ECNL KC

Leader of the Opposition (Newfoundland)
- In office 1977–1979
- Preceded by: Steve Neary
- Succeeded by: Don Jamieson

Leader of the Liberal Party of Newfoundland
- In office 1977–1979
- Preceded by: Steve Neary
- Succeeded by: Don Jamieson

Member of the Newfoundland House of Assembly
- In office 1966–1982

Personal details
- Born: June 4, 1942 (age 84) Grand Bank, Dominion of Newfoundland
- Party: Liberal
- Parents: Frederick William Rowe (father); Edith Laura Butt (mother)
- Education: Memorial University of Newfoundland; University of New Brunswick; University of Oxford

William Neil Rowe, ECNL KC (born June 4, 1942) is a former politician, lawyer, broadcaster, and writer in Newfoundland and Labrador, Canada.

Rowe was born in Grand Bank and is the son of the late Liberal Senator Frederick William Rowe and the late Edith Laura Butt.

Rowe attended Memorial University of Newfoundland where he earned a Bachelor of Arts. He studied for a Bachelor of Law at the University of New Brunswick on a Sir James Hamet Dunn Scholarship, and went on to become a Rhodes Scholar, graduating with an Honours M.A in Law from the University of Oxford.

He entered politics and was elected to the Newfoundland and Labrador House of Assembly five times as a Liberal MHA, first at the age of twenty-four. He was appointed, at twenty-six, as a Cabinet Minister in the Government of Joey Smallwood and became responsible for several departments. He was later elected as Leader of the Opposition, holding that position from 1977 to 1979. He resigned his position prior to the 1979 general election, in favour of Don Jamieson, but kept his own seat.

One of Rowe's political aides while he was Opposition Leader was a young Brian Tobin.

In 1982, Rowe lost his seat in the Newfoundland general election, which saw the Progressive Conservatives under the leadership of Brian Peckford, win by a landslide, taking 44 seats.

After leaving politics, Rowe resumed his law practice. As a lawyer, he practiced in St. John's for over three decades, concentrating for years on labour-management arbitrations. During the 1980s he was retained by the federal Minister of National Revenue to conduct a nationwide inquiry into fishermen's perceived income tax problems with Revenue Canada.

Rowe was appointed to Queen's Counsel in 2007.

A long-time public affairs commentator, Rowe has appeared regularly on national and local television and radio. He has hosted a daily call-in show on VOCM and CFCB radio for nearly thirty years, which focuses on public issues and is carried throughout the province and around the world. Rowe was instrumental in exposing the Mount Cashel Orphanage scandal when he was host of VOCM's Open Line radio show.

Rowe also wrote weekly public affairs columns for St. John's daily newspaper, The Telegram, the Corner Brook Western Star, and other newspapers.

In 2004, Premier Danny Williams appointed him Provincial Representative in Ottawa, where he advised the Premier during the crucial negotiations with the Government of Canada that led to the Atlantic Accord, which secured more than two billion dollars for Newfoundland and Labrador.

Rowe has written five books: Clapp's Rock, a best-selling novel published by McClelland & Stewart of Toronto and serialized on CBC Radio; The Temptation of Victor Galanti, a second novel published by McClelland and Stewart; Is That You, Bill?, a volume of essays on politics and public affairs published by Jesperson Press of St. John's; Danny Williams: The War with Ottawa, published in 2010 by Flanker Press; and Danny Williams, Please Come Back, a compilation of his columns and commentaries, published in 2011 by Flanker Press. In 2012, Flanker Press published Rosie O'Dell, a novel whose cover featured a prominent "Warning: Graphic Content and Mature Subject Matter."

Rowe is a member of the Writers' Union of Canada and has served on the executive of the Writers' Alliance of Newfoundland and Labrador.

On June 22, 2011, Rowe announced on his radio show his intention to retire from VOCM after nearly thirty years to write full-time. He has agreed to fill in periodically for the regular talk show hosts. His last day as host of his show, BackTalk, was Friday, June 24, 2011. Paddy Daly took over for him on August 1, 2011. On March 8, 2013, Rowe once again took over the hosting duties at VOCM Open Line, a week after the resignation of Open Line host Randy Simms over controversial comments made on-air to Natuashish Innu Band Chief Simeon Tshakapesh.
