= Peter J. Walsh =

Canadian politician

Peter John Walsh (April 19, 1931 – February 11, 1995) was a business owner and politician in Newfoundland. He represented Menihek in the Newfoundland House of Assembly from 1979 to 1984.

The son of Basil and Judith Walsh, he was born in Lamaline and was educated there and in Halifax. Walsh served in the Canadian Armed Forces from 1952 to 1959. He worked as a supervisor for the Iron Ore Company of Canada and then started his own construction and transportation company in 1967. He founded the Progressive Conservative association in Menihek and served as its president. He ran unsuccessfully for a seat in the Newfoundland assembly in 1971.

Walsh was elected to the provincial assembly in 1979 and was reelected in 1982. He resigned his seat in 1984 to run for the Labrador seat in the Canadian House of Commons, but lost to Bill Rompkey. He was then named to the Canadian Pension Commission.

Walsh died in a hospital in 1995.
