= 40th General Assembly of Newfoundland =

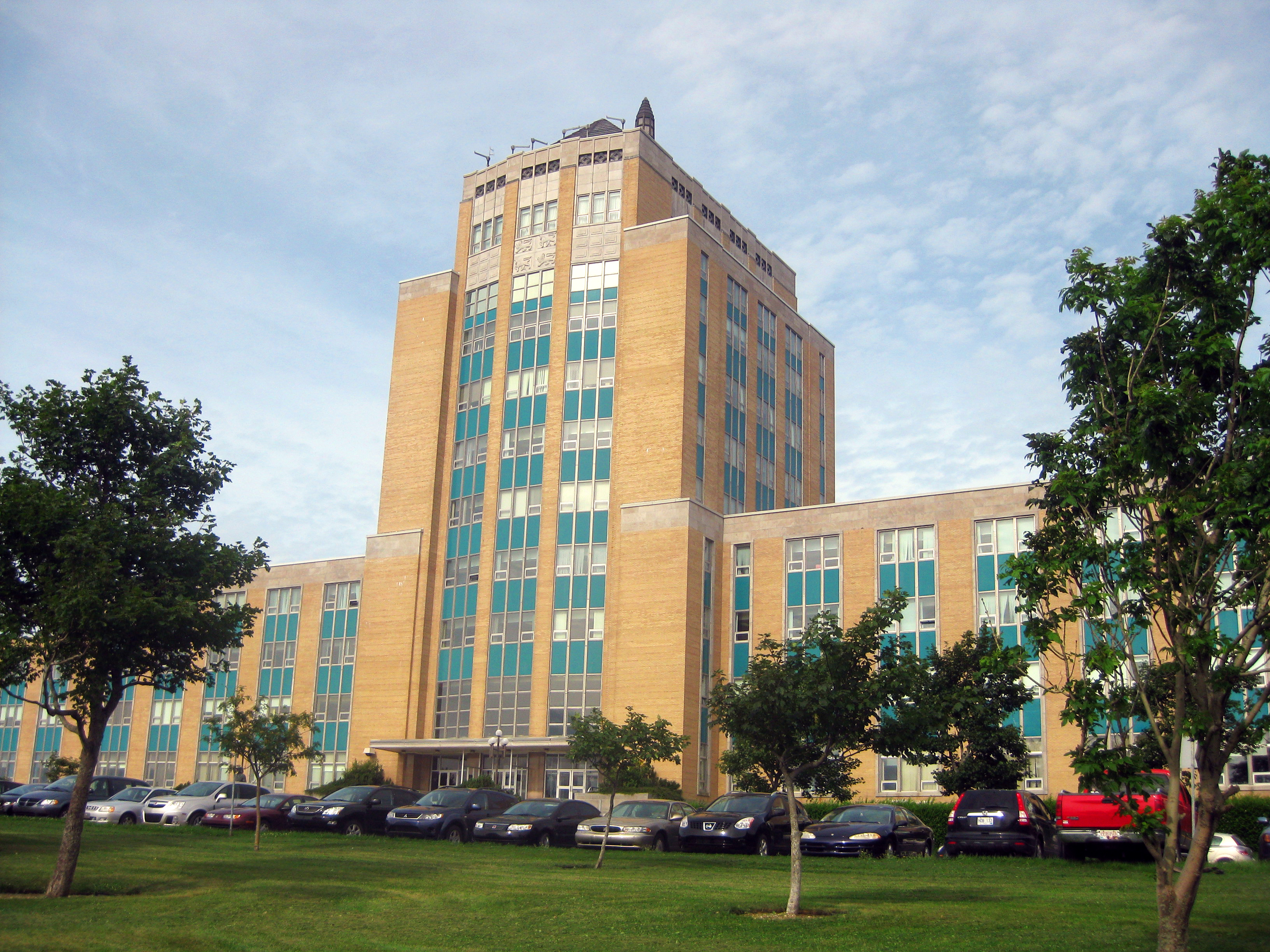
- Confederation Building East Block. Seat of the Newfoundland and Labrador government and the House of Assembly from 1960 to present.

History
- Founded: April 25, 1985
- Disbanded: March 29, 1989
- Preceded by: 39th General Assembly of Newfoundland
- Succeeded by: 41st General Assembly of Newfoundland

Leadership
- Premier: Brian Peckford (Until March 1989)
- Premier: Tom Rideout

Elections
- Last election: 1985 Newfoundland general election

The members of the 40th General Assembly of Newfoundland were elected in the Newfoundland general election held in April 1985. The general assembly sat from April 25, 1985 to March 29, 1989.

The Progressive Conservative Party led by Brian Peckford formed the government. Tom Rideout succeeded Peckford as party leader and Premier in March 1989.

Patrick McNicholas served as speaker.

There were four sessions of the 40th General Assembly:

Session	Start	End
1st	April 25, 1985	February 21, 1986
2nd	March 18, 1986	February 19, 1987
3rd	February 26, 1987	March 8, 1988
4th	March 10, 1988	March 29, 1989

William Anthony Paddon served as lieutenant governor of Newfoundland until 1986. James McGrath succeeded Paddon as lieutenant governor.

== Members of the Assembly ==
The following members were elected to the assembly in 1985:

Member	Electoral district	Party	First elected / previously elected
Thomas Gerard Rideout	Baie Verte-White Bay	Progressive Conservative	1975 (Note: First Elected as a Liberal)
Ted Blanchard	Bay of Islands	Progressive Conservative	1985
Wilson Elwood Callan	Bellevue	Liberal	1975, (Note: First Elected as Liberal Reform) 1981
Wilson Elwood Callan	Bellevue	Progressive Conservative	1975, 1981
Tom Lush	Bonavista North	Liberal	1975, (Note: Terra Nova) 1985
James Morgan	Bonavista South	Progressive Conservative	1972
Dave Gilbert	Burgeo-Bay d'Espoir	Liberal	1985
Glenn Tobin	Burin-Placentia West	Progressive Conservative	1982
Milton Peach	Carbonear	Progressive Conservative	1982
John Butt	Conception Bay South	Progressive Conservative	1979
Eugene Hiscock	Eagle River	Liberal	1979
Hugh Matthew Twomey	Exploits	Progressive Conservative	1976
Charlie Power	Ferryland	Progressive Conservative	1975, 1977
Beaton Tulk	Fogo	Liberal	1979
Roger Simmons	Fortune-Hermitage	Liberal	1973, (Note: Burgeo-Bay D'Espoir) 1985
Winston Baker	Gander	Liberal	1985
Bill Matthews	Grand Bank	Progressive Conservative	1982
Len Simms	Grand Falls	Progressive Conservative	1979
A. Brian Peckford	Green Bay	Progressive Conservative	1972
Haig Young	Harbour Grace	Progressive Conservative	1972
Norman E. Doyle	Harbour Main	Progressive Conservative	1979
Lynn Verge	Humber East	Progressive Conservative	1979
Rick Woodford	Humber Valley	Progressive Conservative	1985
Raymond Baird	Humber West	Progressive Conservative	1979
Robert Aylward	Kilbride	Progressive Conservative	1979
Calvin Mitchell	La Poile	Progressive Conservative	1985
Maxwell James Russell	Lewisporte	Progressive Conservative	1971, 1982
Peter Fenwick	Menihek	New Democrat	1984
H. Neil Windsor	Mount Pearl	Progressive Conservative	1979
Leo Barry	Mount Scio	Liberal	1972, (Note: Burin-Placentia West (First Elected as a Progressive Conservative)) 1979
Jim Kelland	Naskaupi	Liberal	1985
William G. Patterson	Placentia	Progressive Conservative	1975
Jerome W. Dinn	Pleasantville	Progressive Conservative	1975
James Hodder	Port au Port	Progressive Conservative	1975
John Efford	Port de Grave	Liberal	1985
Chuck Furey	St. Barbe	Liberal	1985
Ronald Gilbert Dawe	St. George's	Progressive Conservative	1979
Patrick J. McNicholas	St. John's Centre	Progressive Conservative	1979
William Marshall	St. John's East	Progressive Conservative	1970
Gene Long (1986)	St. John's East	New Democrat	1986
Thomas V. Hickey	St. John's East Extern	Progressive Conservative	1966
Kevin Parsons (1986)	St. John's East Extern	Progressive Conservative	1986
John Carter	St. John's North	Progressive Conservative	1971
John F. Collins	St. John's South	Progressive Conservative	1982
Harold Barrett	St. John's West	Progressive Conservative	1979
Loyola Hearn	St. Mary's-The Capes	Progressive Conservative	1982
Kevin Aylward	Stephenville	Liberal	1985
Chris Decker	Strait of Belle Isle	Liberal	1985
Glen C. Greening	Terra Nova	Progressive Conservative	1983
Garfield E. Warren	Torngat Mountains	Progressive Conservative	1979
James G. Reid	Trinity-Bay de Verde	Progressive Conservative	1982
Charlie Brett	Trinity North	Progressive Conservative	1972
Walter Carmichael Carter	Twillingate	Liberal	1962, (Note: White Bay North) 1975, (Note: St. Mary's-The Capes (Re-Elected as a Progressive Conservative)) 1985
Gerald Ryan Ottenheimer	Waterford-Kenmount	Progressive Conservative	1966, (Note: St. John's East) 1971
Eric Gullage (1988)	Waterford-Kenmount	Liberal	1988
Graham Flight	Windsor-Buchans	Liberal	1975, 1985
Clyde Wells	Windsor-Buchans	Liberal	1966, (Note: Humber East) 1987

== By-elections ==
By-elections were held to replace members for various reasons:

Electoral district	Member elected	Affiliation	Election date	Reason
St. John's East	Gene Long	New Democrat	December 9, 1986	T V Hickey resigned seat in November 1986
St. John's East Extern	Kevin Parsons	Progressive Conservative	December 9, 1986	W W Marshall resigned seat in November 1986
Windsor-Buchans	Clyde Wells	Liberal	December 17, 1987	G Flight resigned seat in June 1987 to allow Liberal Party leader to run for a seat in the assembly
Waterford-Kenmount	Eric Gullage	Liberal	March 9, 1988	G R Ottenheimer named to Senate of Canada in December 1987
