= 1985 Newfoundland general election =

Canadian provincial election

- April 2, 1985

52 seats of the Newfoundland House of Assembly 27 seats needed for a majority
- Turnout: 77.3% (▼0.2 pp)
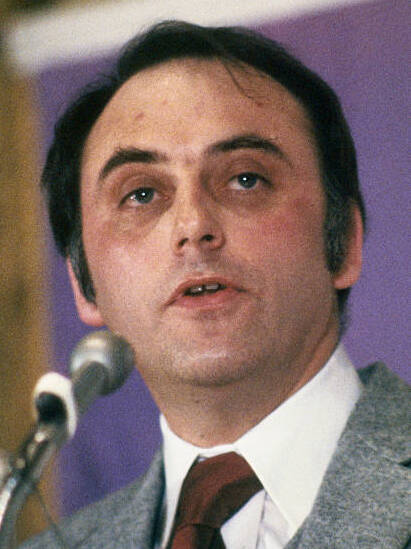
	First party	Second party	Third party
		LIB	NDP
Leader	Brian Peckford	Leo Barry	Peter Fenwick
Party	Progressive Conservative	Liberal	New Democratic
Leader since	17 March 1979	1984	1981
Leader's seat	Green Bay	Mount Scio	Menihek
Last election	44	8	0
Seats won	36	15	1
Seat change	▼8	▲7	▲1
Popular vote	134,893	102,016	39,954
Percentage	48.6%	36.7%	14.4%
Swing	▼12.5pp	▲1.6pp	▲10.7pp
Premier before election
Brian Peckford
Progressive Conservative
Premier after election
Brian Peckford
Progressive Conservative

The 1985 Newfoundland general election was held on 2 April 1985 to elect members of the 40th General Assembly of Newfoundland. It was won by the Progressive Conservative party under Premier Brian Peckford.

== Results ==
Party	Leader	1982	Seats won	% change	Popular vote	(%)
Progressive Conservative	Brian Peckford	44	36	-18%	134,893	48.6%
Liberal	Leo Barry	8	15	+88%	102,016	36.7%
New Democratic	Peter Fenwick	0	1	100%	39,954	14.4%
Other		0	0	0%	778	0.3%
Totals		52	52	-	278,502	100%

== Results by district ==
- Names in **boldface type** represent party leaders.
- † indicates that the incumbent did not run again.

=== St. John's ===
Electoral district	Candidates			Incumbent
Electoral district	PC	Liberal	NDP	Incumbent
Kilbride; 76.04% turnout	Robert Aylward; 3,668; 56.71%	Joseph Sala; 1,170; 18.09%	Alfred Sullivan; 1,630; 25.20%	Robert Aylward
Pleasantville; 74.33% turnout	Jerome Dinn; 3,003; 47.13%	Walter Noel; 2,196; 34.47%	Paul Ring; 1,172; 18.40%	Jerome Dinn
St. John's Centre; 73.55% turnout	Patrick McNicholas; 3,332; 50.97%	Mary Philpott; 2,229; 34.10%	Nina Patey; 976; 14.93%	Patrick McNicholas
St. John's East; 72.79% turnout	William Marshall; 2,738; 50.18%	Hugh Shea; 738; 13.52%	Gene Long; 1,981; 36.30%	William Marshall
St. John's North; 72.14% turnout	John Carter; 2,631; 48.64%	Judi Murphy; 1,347; 24.90%	Dorothy Inglis; 1,431; 26.46%	John Carter
St. John's South; 64.28% turnout	John Collins; 2,466; 54.38%	Dolores Linehan; 1,145; 25.25%	Bob Matthews; 924; 20.37%	John Collins
St. John's West; 67.08% turnout	Harold Barrett; 3,382; 52.15%	Gerald Moore; 1,595; 24.60%	Thomas O'Leary; 1,508; 23.25%	Harold Barrett
Waterford-Kenmount; 70.65% turnout	Gerry Ottenheimer; 3,251; 56.98%	Eric Adams; 1,401; 24.55%	Wallace Day; 1,054; 18.47%	Gerry Ottenheimer

=== St. John's suburbs ===
Electoral district	Candidates				Incumbent
Electoral district	PC	Liberal	NDP	Other	Incumbent
Conception Bay South; 73.51% turnout	John Butt; 2,179; 48.80%	Ron Clarke; 1,737; 38.90%	Art Dawe; 353; 7.91%	Gordon Dawe (Independent); 196; 4.39%	John Butt
Mount Pearl; 73.16% turnout	Neil Windsor; 3,365; 54.97%	Boyd Batten; 1,432; 23.40%	Leo Thistle; 1,324; 21.63%		Neil Windsor
Mount Scio-Bell Island; 83.79% turnout	James Hearn; 2,879; 42.19%	**Leo Barry**; 3,321; 48.67%	Gerry Panting; 624; 9.14%		**Leo Barry**
St. John's East Extern; 80.50% turnout	Tom Hickey; 3,489; 55.66%	Fred Littlejohn; 1,410; 22.49%	Robert Anderson; 1,370; 21.85%		Tom Hickey

=== Avalon Peninsula ===
Electoral district	Candidates			Incumbent
Electoral district	PC	Liberal	NDP	Incumbent
Carbonear; 80.91% turnout	Milton Peach; 3,203; 50.58%	Rod Moores; 2,712; 42.82%	Isabelle King; 418; 6.60%	Milton Peach
Ferryland; 82.12% turnout	Charlie Power; 2,537; 55.52%	Helen Kenny; 687; 15.03%	Adrian Sullivan; 1,346; 29.45%	Charlie Power
Harbour Grace; 83.50% turnout	Haig Young; 2,729; 50.91%	John Crane; 2,498; 46.61%	Helen Porter; 133; 2.48%	Haig Young
Harbour Main; 79.27% turnout	Norman Doyle; 3,784; 58.88%	Jerry Lewis; 398; 6.19%	George Flaherty; 2,245; 34.93%	Norman Doyle
Placentia; 83.78% turnout	William Patterson; 2,295; 50.15%	Rex Murphy; 2,149; 46.96%	Kevin Walsh; 132; 2.89%	William Patterson
Port de Grave; 84.58% turnout	Randy W. Collins; 2,657; 40.40%	John Efford; 3,614; 54.96%	Byron Petten; 305; 4.64%	Randy W. Collins
St. Mary's-The Capes; 80.11% turnout	Loyola Hearn; 3,125; 73.76%	Marie Walsh; 733; 17.30%	Leo Coffey; 379; 8.94%	Loyola Hearn
Trinity-Bay de Verde; 77.49% turnout	James Reid; 2,369; 48.21%	Walter Brown; 1,860; 37.85%	Bert Pitcher; 685; 13.94%	James Reid

=== Eastern Newfoundland ===
Electoral district	Candidates				Incumbent
Electoral district	PC	Liberal	NDP	Other	Incumbent
Bellevue; 80.27% turnout	Basil Jamieson; 2,852; 43.91%	Wilson Callan; 3,030; 46.65%	Mose Ingram; 613; 9.44%		Wilson Callan
Bonavista North; 85.03% turnout	George Cross; 2,861; 47.27%	Tom Lush; 2,983; 49.29%	John Blackwood; 150; 2.48%	Wayne Davis (Independent); 58; 0.96%	George Cross
Bonavista South; 66.73% turnout	Jim Morgan; 2,424; 58.61%	Ancel Johnson; 1,193; 28.84%	Harry Faulkner; 519; 12.55%		Jim Morgan
Fogo; 84.14% turnout	Wayne Wheaton; 2,580; 44.21%	Beaton Tulk; 3,124; 53.53%	Hayward Cross; 132; 2.26%		Beaton Tulk
Terra Nova; 74.23% turnout	Glen Greening; 2,857; 56.03%	Everett Cross; 2,099; 41.17%		Gordon Genge (Independent); 143; 2.80%	Glen Greening
Trinity North; 74.52% turnout	Charlie Brett; 3,137; 56.90%	Myra Moore; 2,082; 37.76%	Bill Abbott; 294; 5.34%		Charlie Brett

=== Central Newfoundland ===
Electoral district	Candidates			Incumbent
Electoral district	PC	Liberal	NDP	Incumbent
Baie Verte-White Bay; 82.42% turnout	Tom Rideout; 2,532; 51.87%	Harold Small; 2,127; 43.58%	Richard Shelley; 222; 4.55%	Tom Rideout
Exploits; 65.70% turnout	Hugh Twomey; 2,805; 53.55%	Gerald Thompson; 1,517; 28.96%	Ron Chafe; 916; 17.49%	Hugh Twomey
Gander; 77.25% turnout	Hazel Newhook; 2,319; 39.51%	Winston Baker; 3,309; 56.38%	Joe Tremblett; 241; 4.11%	Hazel Newhook
Grand Falls; 89.53% turnout	Len Simms; 2,208; 44.25%	George Anderson; 615; 12.32%	Bryan Blackmore; 2,167; 43.43%	Len Simms
Green Bay; 70.36% turnout	**Brian Peckford**; 3,373; 68.56%	Renold Clarke; 1,254; 25.49%	Mervyn Poole; 293; 5.95%	**Brian Peckford**
Lewisporte; 71.07% turnout	James Russell; 3,035; 52.40%	Joy Sceviour; 2,551; 44.04%	William Fogwill; 206; 3.56%	James Russell
Twillingate; 71.51% turnout	Ida Reid; 1,874; 44.59%	Walter Carter; 2,329; 55.41%		Ida Reid
Windsor-Buchans; 81.18% turnout	John McLennon; 1,726; 37.48%	Graham Flight; 2,547; 55.31%	John Budden; 332; 7.21%	John McLennon

=== Southern Newfoundland ===
Electoral district	Candidates			Incumbent
Electoral district	PC	Liberal	NDP	Incumbent
Burgeo-Bay d'Espoir; 78.39% turnout	Harold Andrews; 2,062; 47.75%	Dave Gilbert; 2,256; 52.25%		Harold Andrews
Burin-Placentia West; 85.16% turnout	Glenn Tobin; 3,869; 53.59%	Wilson Brown; 2,794; 38.70%	Chesley Cribb; 557; 7.71%	Glenn Tobin
Fortune-Hermitage; 81.12% turnout	Don Stewart; 2,254; 45.57%	Roger Simmons; 2,535; 51.25%	Joe Edwards; 157; 3.18%	Don Stewart
Grand Bank; 79.89% turnout	Bill Matthews; 3,028; 49.25%	Maxwell Snook; 2,689; 43.74%	Calvin Peach; 431; 7.01%	Bill Matthews
La Poile; 76.22% turnout	Cal Mitchell; 2,138; 40.88%	Noreen Saunders; 1,797; 34.36%	Stephen MacKenzie; 1,295; 24.76%	Steve Neary†

=== Western Newfoundland ===
Electoral district	Candidates				Incumbent
Electoral district	PC	Liberal	NDP	Other	Incumbent
Bay of Islands; 77.51% turnout	Ted Blanchard; 2,419; 43.24%	Graham Watton; 2,404; 42.98%	Jeanette Leitch; 771; 13.78%		Luke Woodrow†
Humber East; 77.87% turnout	Lynn Verge; 2,955; 44.63%	Keith Payne; 2,670; 40.33%	Stuart Fraser; 996; 15.04%		Lynn Verge
Humber Valley; 76.40% turnout	Rick Woodford; 2,197; 47.64%	David Hedd; 1,804; 39.11%	Terry Brazil; 611; 13.25%		Vacant (Note: Wallace House had been elected in 1982, but he died on February 3, 1985, leaving the seat vacant.)
Humber West; 79.49% turnout	Ray Baird; 2,195; 38.90%	Scott Simmons; 2,112; 37.43%	Frank Burke; 1,273; 22.56%	Derek Woodman (Independent); 63; 1.11%	Ray Baird
Port au Port; 85.25% turnout	Jim Hodder; 2,429; 53.33%	Sandy Chisholm; 1,203; 26.41%	Bob Cormier; 923; 20.26%		Jim Hodder
St. Barbe; 78.83% turnout	Everett Osmond; 2,752; 41.26%	Chuck Furey; 2,768; 41.50%	Ed Broaders; 1,150; 17.24%		Everett Osmond
St. George's; 78.77% turnout	Ron Dawe; 2,729; 56.03%	Francis Berkshire; 1,914; 39.29%	Ken Gould; 228; 4.68%		Ron Dawe
Stephenville; 78.86% turnout	Frederick Stagg; 1,690; 40.21%	Kevin Aylward; 2,185; 51.99%	Marion McEachren; 328; 7.80%		Frederick Stagg
Strait of Belle Isle; 75.92% turnout	George Sutton; 1,077; 18.07%	Chris Decker; 3,136; 52.61%	Max Short; 1,430; 23.99%	Wade Reid (Independent); 318; 5.33%	Edward Roberts†

=== Labrador ===
Electoral district	Candidates			Incumbent
Electoral district	PC	Liberal	NDP	Incumbent
Eagle River; 78.19% turnout	Stanley Pike; 781; 30.94%	Eugene Hiscock; 1,170; 46.36%	Claude Rumbolt; 573; 22.70%	Eugene Hiscock
Menihek; 90.82% turnout	Alec Snow; 2,610; 45.39%	Andrew Spracklin; 299; 5.20%	**Peter Fenwick**; 2,841; 49.41%	**Peter Fenwick**
Naskaupi; 86.06% turnout	Joseph Goudie; 1,454; 33.28%	Jim Kelland; 2,685; 61.46%	Barbara Maidment; 230; 5.26%	Joseph Goudie
Torngat Mountains; 81.69% turnout	Garfield Warren; 589; 51.80%	Melvin Woodward; 463; 40.72%	John Terriak; 85; 7.48%	Garfield Warren
