= 1989 Newfoundland general election =

Canadian provincial election

- April 20, 1989

52 seats of the Newfoundland House of Assembly 27 seats needed for a majority
- Turnout: 80.6% (▲3.3 pp)
	First party	Second party	Third party
	LIB	PC	NDP
Leader	Clyde Wells	Tom Rideout	Cle Newhook
Party	Liberal	Progressive Conservative	New Democratic
Leader's seat	Windsor-Buchans; Ran in Humber East (lost)	Baie Verte-Springdale	Ran in St. John's East Extern (lost)
Last election	15	36	1
Seats won	31	21	0
Seat change	▲16	▼15	▼1
Popular vote	137,271	138,609	12,929
Percentage	47.2%	47.6%	4.4%
Swing	▲10.5pp	▼1.0pp	▼10.0pp
Premier before election
Tom Rideout
Progressive Conservative
Premier after election
Clyde Wells
Liberal

The 1989 Newfoundland general election was held on April 20, 1989 to elect members of the 41st General Assembly of Newfoundland. It was won by the Liberal party despite polling fewer votes than the Conservatives.

Unusually, however, Liberal leader Clyde Wells was defeated by Lynn Verge in his own riding of Humber East despite having led his party to victory. Consequently, a member of his caucus, Eddie Joyce, resigned shortly after the election, and Wells was acclaimed to office in the riding of Bay of Islands. Seven years later, Verge was the leader of the Progressive Conservatives during the 1996 election, and she also lost Humber East in the election, though her party did not win that election.

== Opinion polls ==
Evolution of voting intentions at provincial level
Polling firm	Last day of survey	Source	LPNL	PCNL	NLNDP	Other	ME	Sample
Election 1989	April 20, 1989		47.2	47.6	4.4	0.8		
Omnifacts	April 1989		41.6	52.1	6.3	—N/a	4.1	622
	April 1989		43.9	50	6.1	—N/a	—N/a	1,305
Election 1985	November 6, 1984		36.7	48.6	14.4	0.3		

== Results ==
Summary of the House of Assembly of Newfoundland and Labrador election results
Party	Party leader	Candidates	Seats				Popular vote		
Party	Party leader	Candidates	1985	Dissol.	1989	Change	#	%	% Change
Liberal	Clyde Wells	52	15	14	31	▲ +16	137,271	47.2	+10.5
Progressive Conservative	Tom Rideout	52	36	34	21	▼ −15	138,609	47.6	–1.0
New Democratic	Cle Newhook	36	1	2	0	▼ −1	12,929	4.4	–10.0
Independents		5	0	0	0	0	2,138	0.8	+0.5
Vacant				2					
Total		145	52	52	52	-	291,785	100	-

== Results by district ==
- Names in **boldface type** represent party leaders.
- † represents that the incumbent did not run again.
- ‡ represents that the incumbent ran in a different district.

=== St. John's ===
Electoral district	Candidates			Incumbent
Electoral district	PC	Liberal	NDP	Incumbent
Kilbride; 77.25% turnout	Robert Aylward; 3,452; 49.08%	Gerry Glavine; 2,960; 42.09%	Kevin James; 621; 8.83%	Robert Aylward
Pleasantville; 74.87% turnout	Stephen Stafford; 2,972; 42.65%	Walter Noel; 3,284; 47.12%	Dennis MacKay; 713; 10.23%	Jerome Dinn†
St. John's Centre; 79.52% turnout	Patrick McNicholas; 2,838; 44.14%	Hubert Kitchen; 2,967; 46.14%	Vicky Silk; 625; 9.72%	Patrick McNicholas
St. John's East; 83.00% turnout	Shannie Duff; 2,397; 41.72%	Lynette Billard; 1,212; 21.09%	Gene Long; 2,137; 37.19%	Gene Long
St. John's North; 69.73% turnout	Tom Osborne; 1,937; 37.71%	Phil Warren; 2,705; 52.66%	Dorothy Inglis; 495; 9.63%	John Carter†
St. John's South; 71.49% turnout (Note: A judicial recount was held in this riding.)	Douglas Atkinson; 2,105; 43.04%	Tom Murphy; 2,107; 43.08%	Linda Hyde; 679; 13.88%	John Collins†
St. John's West; 72.52% turnout	Harold Barrett; 2,583; 40.67%	Rex Gibbons; 3,389; 53.35%	Larry Power; 380; 5.98%	Harold Barrett
Waterford-Kenmount; 79.59% turnout	Ralph Tucker; 3,188; 42.85%	Eric Gullage; 3,947; 53.06%	Wayne James; 304; 4.09%	Eric Gullage

=== St. John's suburbs ===
Electoral district	Candidates				Incumbent
Electoral district	PC	Liberal	NDP	Other	Incumbent
Conception Bay South; 91.44% turnout	John Butt; 2,580; 44.42%	Pat Cowan; 3,107; 53.50%	Edgar Russell; 121; 2.08%		John Butt
Mount Pearl; 86.13% turnout	Neil Windsor; 4,273; 51.57%	Gordon Seabright; 3,834; 46.27%	Leo Thistle; 179; 2.16%		Neil Windsor
Mount Scio-Bell Island; 74.89% turnout	Myrle Vokey; 3,107; 44.22%	Jim Walsh; 3,143; 44.73%	Kevin Walsh; 425; 6.05%	Josiah Harvey (Independent); 351; 5.00%	Leo Barry†
St. John's East Extern; 85.57% turnout	Kevin Parsons; 3,750; 48.84%	John O'Brien; 2,430; 31.65%	**Cle Newhook**; 1,498; 19.51%		Kevin Parsons

=== Avalon Peninsula ===
Electoral district	Candidates				Incumbent
Electoral district	PC	Liberal	NDP	Other	Incumbent
Carbonear; 90.70% turnout	Milton Peach; 3,387; 48.18%	Art Reid; 3,581; 50.94%		Nicholas Murray (Independent); 62; 0.88%	Milton Peach
Ferryland; 89.25% turnout	Charlie Power; 2,954; 61.61%	Tom Carey; 1,711; 35.68%	Aiden Coady; 130; 2.71%		Charlie Power
Harbour Grace; 85.79% turnout	Joe Gregory; 2,428; 43.04%	John Crane; 3,213; 56.96%			Haig Young†
Harbour Main; 78.65% turnout	Norman Doyle; 4,123; 65.59%	Rod Fowler; 1,485; 23.62%	Gus Flannigan; 678; 10.79%		Norman Doyle
Placentia; 83.95% turnout	William Patterson; 1,760; 37.93%	William Hogan; 2,702; 58.23%	Cletus Canning; 178; 3.84%		William Patterson
Port de Grave; 87.77% turnout	Lewis Gosse; 2,050; 29.67%	John Efford; 4,797; 69.43%	Wayne Lucas; 62; 0.90%		John Efford
St. Mary's-The Capes; 79.95% turnout	Loyola Hearn; 3,100; 75.13%	Don O'Keefe; 913; 22.13%	Ian Penney; 113; 2.74%		Loyola Hearn
Trinity-Bay de Verde; 81.39% turnout	Wayne Quinlan; 1,999; 39.66%	Lloyd Snow; 2,768; 54.92%	Bert Pitcher; 189; 3.75%	Bren Howard (Independent); 84; 1.67%	James Reid†

=== Eastern Newfoundland ===
Electoral district	Candidates			Incumbent
Electoral district	PC	Liberal	NDP	Incumbent
Bellevue; 77.31% turnout	Bruce Stagg; 2,233; 35.40%	Percy Barrett; 3,842; 60.91%	Harvey Thistle; 233; 3.69%	Wilson Callan†
Bonavista North; 88.06% turnout	Eli Cross; 2,351; 39.59%	Tom Lush; 3,470; 58.44%	Ingwald Feltham; 117; 1.97%	Tom Lush
Bonavista South; 67.54% turnout	Roger Fitzgerald; 1,932; 46.63%	Aubrey Gover; 1,952; 47.12%	Rex Sheppard; 259; 6.25%	Jim Morgan†
Fogo; 84.85% turnout	Sam Winsor; 2,966; 50.81%	Beaton Tulk; 2,872; 49.19%		Beaton Tulk
Terra Nova; 78.52% turnout	Glen Greening; 2.920; 54.50%	Ray Goulding; 2,370; 44.23%	Randy Miller; 68; 1.27%	Glen Greening
Trinity North; 79.02% turnout	Charlie Brett; 3,431; 56.61%	Wendell Moore; 2,506; 41.35%	Sam Kelly; 124; 2.04%	Charlie Brett

=== Central Newfoundland ===
Electoral district	Candidates			Incumbent
Electoral district	PC	Liberal	NDP	Incumbent
Baie Verte-White Bay; 84.36% turnout	**Tom Rideout**; 4,109; 82.38%	Joe Gedge; 879; 17.62%		**Tom Rideout**
Exploits; 73.35% turnout	Paul Cooper; 2,801; 48.51%	Roger Grimes; 2,850; 49.36%	Reg Hemeon; 123; 2.13%	Hugh Twomey†
Gander; 76.20% turnout	Agnes Richard; 2,029; 35.57%	Winston Baker; 3,460; 60.66%	Claude Elliott; 215; 3.77%	Winston Baker
Grand Falls; 85.41% turnout	Len Simms; 3,400; 64.87%	Jim Hornell; 1,841; 35.13%		Len Simms
Green Bay; 72.90% turnout	Alvin Hewlett; 3,043; 58.85%	Maurice Budgell; 2,128; 41.15%		Brian Peckford†
Lewisporte; 73.98% turnout	Anne Picco; 2,836; 46.42%	Melvin Penney; 3,148; 51.53%	Berkley Rose; 125; 2.05%	James Russell†
Twillingate; 79.81% turnout	Ida Reid; 2,133; 46.98%	Walter Carter; 2,353; 51.83%	John Lewis; 54; 1.19%	Walter Carter
Windsor-Buchans; 85.50% turnout	Ray Hunter; 2,164; 46.96%	Graham Flight; 2,336; 50.69%	Bernard Woodfine; 108; 2.35%	**Clyde Wells**‡ (ran in Humber East)

=== Southern Newfoundland ===
Electoral district	Candidates			Incumbent
Electoral district	PC	Liberal	NDP	Incumbent
Burgeo-Bay d'Espoir; 82.39% turnout	Boyd Pack; 2,258; 48.20%	Dave Gilbert; 2,427; 51.80%		Dave Gilbert
Burin-Placentia West; 85.82% turnout	Glenn Tobin; 5,095; 66.06%	Dave Brenton; 2,618; 33.94%		Glenn Tobin
Fortune-Hermitage; 75.70% turnout	Oliver Langdon; 2,827; 60.16%	Nathan Cutler; 1,872; 39.84%		Roger Simmons†
Grand Bank; 75.82% turnout	Bill Matthews; 3,948; 68.55%	Graham Wood; 1,811; 31.45%		Bill Matthews
La Poile; 70.89% turnout	Cal Mitchell; 1,757; 35.52%	Bill Ramsay; 2,413; 48.77%	Stephen MacKenzie; 777; 15.71%	Cal Mitchell

=== Western Newfoundland ===
Electoral district	Candidates				Incumbent
Electoral district	PC	Liberal	NDP	Other	Incumbent
Bay of Islands; 81.17% turnout	Leonard Gillingham; 1,418; 23.20%	Eddie Joyce; 3,320; 54.32%	Ken Gould; 159; 2.60%	Myles Griffin (Independent); 789; 12.91%	Ted Blanchard†
Bay of Islands; 81.17% turnout	Leonard Gillingham; 1,418; 23.20%	Eddie Joyce; 3,320; 54.32%	Ken Gould; 159; 2.60%	Trevor Bennett (Independent); 426; 6.97%	Ted Blanchard†
Humber East; 88.75% turnout	Lynn Verge; 3,658; 50.10%	**Clyde Wells**; 3,515; 48.14%	Jim McManamy; 129; 1.76%		Lynn Verge
Humber Valley; 79.95% turnout	Rick Woodford; 2,687; 55.84%	Gary Gale; 2,125; 44.16%			Rick Woodford
Humber West; 87.30% turnout	Jeannette Christopher; 2,341; 38.73%	Paul Dicks; 3,703; 61.27%			Ray Baird†
Port au Port; 91.91% turnout	Jim Hodder; 2,313; 50.25%	Mark Felix; 2,192; 47.62%	Leo Foley; 98; 2.13%		Jim Hodder
St. Barbe; 83.62% turnout	Joseph Kennedy; 3,439; 49.04%	Chuck Furey; 3,573; 50.96%			Chuck Furey
St. George's; 77.91% turnout	Wayne Wheeler; 2,121; 44.48%	Larry Short; 2,647; 55.52%			Ron Dawe†
Stephenville; 87.39% turnout	Wayne Morrison; 1,500; 36.63%	Kevin Aylward; 2,395; 58.49%	Wade Morris; 200; 4.88%		Kevin Aylward
Strait of Belle Isle; 70.53% turnout	Francis Reardon; 1,953; 34.49%	Chris Decker; 3,284; 57.99%		Edward Hollahan (Independent); 426; 7.52%	Chris Decker

=== Labrador ===
Electoral district	Candidates			Incumbent
Electoral district	PC	Liberal	NDP	Incumbent
Eagle River; 80.35% turnout	Reginald Hancock; 1,020; 40.05%	Danny Dumaresque; 1,527; 59.95%		Eugene Hiscock†
Menihek; 87.02% turnout	Alec Snow; 3,004; 53.15%	Bill Kelly; 2,291; 40.53%	Nelson Larson; 357; 6.32%	Peter Fenwick†
Naskaupi; 90.42% turnout	Ian Strachan; 1,118; 26.73%	Jim Kelland; 2,882; 68.90%	Dorothy King; 183; 4.37%	Jim Kelland
Torngat Mountains; 90.40% turnout	Garfield Warren; 821; 62.77%	Mervin Linstead; 414; 31.65%	Bill Wheaton; 73; 5.58%	Garfield Warren
