= 41st General Assembly of Newfoundland =

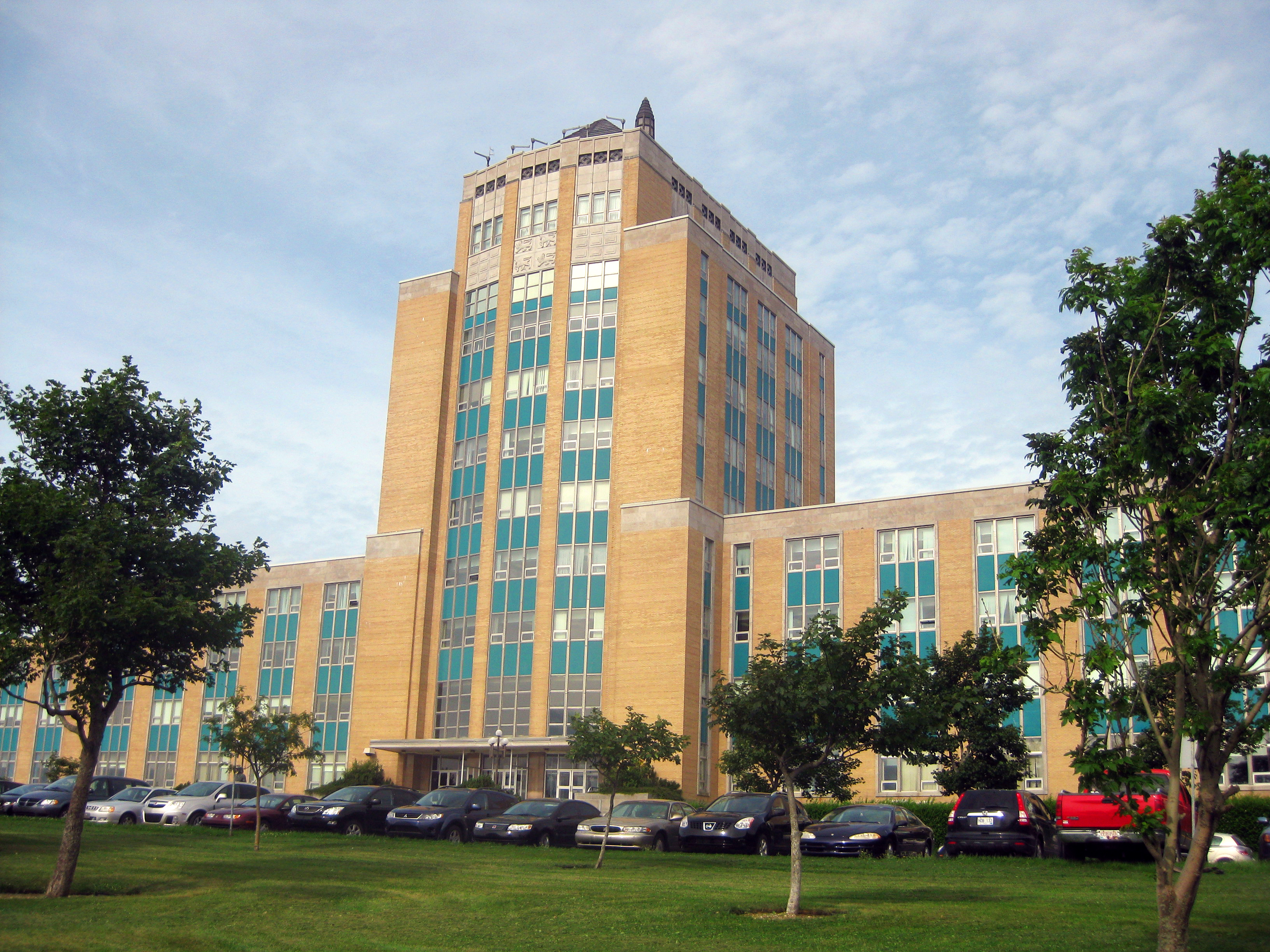
- Confederation Building East Block. Seat of the Newfoundland and Labrador government and the House of Assembly from 1960 to present.

History
- Founded: May 25, 1989
- Disbanded: April 5, 1993
- Preceded by: 40th General Assembly of Newfoundland
- Succeeded by: 42nd General Assembly of Newfoundland

Leadership
- Premier: Clyde Wells

Elections
- Last election: 1989 Newfoundland general election

The members of the 41st General Assembly of Newfoundland were elected in the Newfoundland general election held in April 1989. The general assembly sat from May 25, 1989, to April 5, 1993.

The Liberal Party led by Clyde Wells formed the government.

Thomas Lush served as speaker.

There were five sessions of the 41st General Assembly:

Session	Start	End
1st	May 25, 1989	March 7, 1990
2nd	March 8, 1990	February 27, 1991
3rd	February 28, 1991	March 4, 1992
4th	March 5, 1992	March 2, 1993
5th	March 4, 1993	April 5, 1993

James McGrath served as lieutenant governor of Newfoundland until 1991. Frederick Russell succeeded McGrath as lieutenant governor.

== Members of the Assembly ==
The following members were elected to the assembly in 1989:

Member	Electoral district	Party	First elected / previously elected
Thomas Rideout	Baie Verte-White Bay	Progressive Conservative	1975 (Note: First Elected as a Liberal)
Harold Small (1991)	Baie Verte-White Bay	Liberal	1991
Edward Joyce	Bay of Islands	Liberal	1989
Clyde Wells (1989)	Bay of Islands	Liberal	1966, (Note: Humber East) 1987, (Note: Windsor-Buchans) 1989
Percy Barrett	Bellevue	Liberal	1989
Thomas Lush	Bonavista North	Liberal	1975, (Note: Terra Nova) 1985
Aubrey Gover	Bonavista South	Liberal	1989
Dave Gilbert	Burgeo-Bay d'Espoir	Liberal	1985
Glenn Tobin	Burin-Placentia West	Progressive Conservative	1982
Art Reid	Carbonear	Liberal	1989
Pat Cowan	Conception Bay South	Liberal	1989
Danny Dumaresque	Eagle River	Liberal	1989
Roger Grimes	Exploits	Liberal	1989
Charlie Power	Ferryland	Progressive Conservative	1975, 1977
Loyola Sullivan (1992)	Ferryland	Progressive Conservative	1992
Sam Winsor	Fogo	Progressive Conservative	1989
Oliver Langdon	Fortune-Hermitage	Progressive Conservative	1989
Winston Baker	Gander	Liberal	1985
Bill Matthews	Grand Bank	Progressive Conservative	1982
Len Simms	Grand Falls	Progressive Conservative	1979
Alvin Hewlett	Green Bay	Progressive Conservative	1989
John Crane	Harbour Grace	Liberal	1989
Norman Doyle	Harbour Main	Progressive Conservative	1979
Lynn Verge	Humber East	Progressive Conservative	1979
Rick Woodford	Humber Valley	Progressive Conservative	1985
Paul Dicks	Humber West	Liberal	1989
Robert Aylward	Kilbride	Progressive Conservative	1979
William Ramsay	La Poile	Liberal	1989
Melvin Penney	Lewisporte	Liberal	1989
Alec Snow	Menihek	Progressive Conservative	1989
Neil Windsor	Mount Pearl	Progressive Conservative	1979
Jim Walsh	Mount Scio-Bell Island	Liberal	1989
Jim Kelland	Naskaupi	Liberal	1985
Edward Roberts (1992)	Naskaupi	Liberal	1966, (Note: White Bay North) 1992
William Hogan	Placentia	Liberal	1989
Walter Noel	Pleasantville	Liberal	1989
Jim Hodder	Port au Port	Progressive Conservative	1975
John Efford	Port de Grave	Liberal	1985
Charles Furey	St. Barbe	Liberal	1985
Larry Short	St. George's	Liberal	1989
Hubert Kitchen	St. John's Centre	Liberal	1971, (Note: Harbour Grace) 1977, (Note: St. John's West) 1989
Shannie Duff	St. John's East	Progressive Conservative	1989
Jack Harris (1990)	St. John's East	New Democrat	1990
Kevin Parsons	St. John's East Extern	Progressive Conservative	1986
Philip Warren	St. John's North	Liberal	1989
Thomas Murphy	St. John's South	Liberal	1989
Rex Gibbons	St. John's West	Liberal	1989
Loyola Hearn	St. Mary's-The Capes	Progressive Conservative	1982
Kevin Aylward	Stephenville	Liberal	1985
Chris Decker	Strait of Belle Isle	Liberal	1985
Glen C. Greening	Terra Nova	Progressive Conservative	1983
Garfield Warren	Torngat Mountains	Progressive Conservative	1979
Lloyd Snow	Trinity-Bay de Verde	Liberal	1989
Charlie Brett	Trinity North	Progressive Conservative	1972
Barry Hynes (1989)	Trinity North	Progressive Conservative	1989
Douglas Oldford (1991)	Trinity North	Liberal	1991
Walter Carter	Twillingate	Liberal	1962, 1975, (Note: St. Mary's-The Capes (Re-Elected as a Progressive Conservative)) 1985
Eric Gullage	Waterford-Kenmount	Liberal	1988
Graham Flight	Windsor-Buchans	Liberal	1975, 1985, 1989

== By-elections ==
By-elections were held to replace members for various reasons:

Electoral district	Member elected	Affiliation	Election date	Reason
Bay of Islands	Clyde Wells (Note: Elected by acclamation)	Liberal	May 20, 1989	E Joyce resigned seat in June 1987 to allow Liberal Party leader to run for a seat in the assembly
Trinity North	Barry Hynes (Note: Declared elected after a judicial recount)	Progressive Conservative	October 3, 1989	C Brett resigned seat in July 1989
St. John's East	Jack Harris	New Democrat	December 11, 1990	S Duff resigned seat in September 1990
Trinity North	Douglas Oldford	Liberal	February 19, 1991	B Hynes resigned seat on December 3, 1990
Baie Verte-White Bay	Harold Small	Liberal	1991	T Rideout resigned seat in 1991
Ferryland	Loyola Sullivan	Progressive Conservative	June 25, 1992	C Power resigned seat in May 1992
Naskaupi	Edward Roberts	Liberal	June 25, 1992	J Kelland resigned seat in May 1992
