= Progressive Conservative Party of Newfoundland and Labrador leadership elections =

This page lists the results of leadership elections held by the Progressive Conservative Party of Newfoundland and Labrador. After the defeat of the party's first leader in the 1949 general election and until 1966 the party leadership was officially vacant and the House leader served as de facto party leader.

== 1949 leadership convention ==
(Held April 8, 1949)

- Harry Mews acclaimed

== Developments 1949-1966 ==
Mews was defeated in the 1949 general election and resigned sometime afterward. John Gilbert Higgins was elected House leader and became the first post-Confederation Leader of the Opposition. Higgins retired at the 1951 general election, and Peter Cashin was elected House leader afterwards. Cashin resigned on January 26, 1953, and Malcolm Hollett was elected to succeed him. Hollett was defeated in the 1959 general election and James J. Greene was elected as his replacement. Greene resigned on January 14, 1966, and Noel Murphy was chosen acting leader.

== 1966 leadership convention ==
(Held on April 30, 1966)

- Noel Murphy elected
- Albert Boyle Butt

(Note: the vote totals were not released)

Murphy was defeated in the 1966 general election and Gerry Ottenheimer was elected House leader.

== 1967 leadership convention ==
(Held on May 13, 1967)

- Gerry Ottenheimer acclaimed

Ottenheimer resigned on November 11, 1969. Party President William Marshall was made interim leader and Anthony Joseph Murphy was chosen House leader.

== 1970 leadership convention ==
(Held on May 16, 1970)

- Frank Moores 425
- Hubert Kitchen 91
- Walter Carter 50
- John A. Carter 41
- Joseph Noel 2
- Hugh Shea 2
- Frank Howard-Rose 1

== 1979 leadership convention ==
(Held March 16–17, 1979)

First Ballot:

- Brian Peckford 200
- C. William Doody 157
- Leo Barry 87
- Walter Carter 84
- James Morgan 56
- Ed Maynard 26
- Tom Hickey 24
- Ralph Trask 2
- Kenneth R.J. Prowse 0
- Dorothy Wyatt 0

Second Ballot (Maynard, Hickey, Trask, Prowse and Wyatt eliminated and Morgan withdrew):

- Brian Peckford 272
- C. William Doody 184
- Leo Barry 99
- Walter Carter 83

Third Ballot (Carter eliminated.):

- Brian Peckford 331
- C. William Doody 208
- Leo Barry 80

== 1989 leadership convention ==
(Held on March 11, 1989)

First Ballot:

- Tom Rideout 313
- Len Simms 262
- Neil Windsor 109
- Loyola Hearn 83
- Hal Barrett 22

Second Ballot (Barrett eliminated):

- Tom Rideout 363
- Len Simms 318
- Neil Windsor 64
- Loyola Hearn 38

Third Ballot (Hearn eliminated, Windsor withdrew):

- Tom Rideout 403
- Len Simms 377

== 1991 leadership convention ==
(Held October 19, 1991)

- Len Simms acclaimed

== 1995 leadership convention ==
(Held April 29, 1995)

- Lynn Verge 361
- Loyola Sullivan 358

Verge was defeated in the 1996 general election and Sullivan was appointed interim leader.

== 1998 leadership convention ==
(Held March 7, 1998)

- Ed Byrne acclaimed

== 2001 leadership convention ==
(Held April 7, 2001)

- Danny Williams acclaimed

Williams resigned as premier and party leader on December 3, 2010. Kathy Dunderdale was chosen interim leader and premier.

== 2011 leadership convention ==
(Held April 2, 2011)

- Kathy Dunderdale acclaimed

Dunderdale became premier upon the resignation of Williams and after becoming the PC leader she led the party to victory in the October 2011 election. Dunderdale was the first female premier in the province's history. Dunderdale resigned as Premier on January 24, 2014.

== 2014 leadership conventions ==
=== March 2014 ===
(Held March 2014)

- Frank Coleman acclaimed, declined

=== September 2014 ===
(Held September 13, 2014)

= Eliminated from next round
= Winner

Delegate support by ballot
Candidate	Ballot 1	Ballot 2		Ballot 3	
Name	Votes	Votes	+/- (pp)	Votes	+/- (pp)
Paul Davis	253; 37.0%	340; 50.0%	+13.0%	351; 51.8%	+1.8%
John Ottenheimer	289; 42.3%	339; 49.9%	+7.6%	326; 48.1%	-1.7%
Steve Kent	141; 20.7%	Endorsed Davis			
Votes cast and net change by ballot
Total	683	680	-3	678	-2

== 2018 leadership convention ==
For the first time in the party's history, the voting was conducted through a one-member, one-vote points system, which divided the province into forty districts worth a hundred points each. The points were allocated based on each candidates share of the popular vote. 11,000 members joined the party during this leadership election, of which, just over 4,000 cast their ballots. St. John's lawyer Ches Crosbie won.

Point allocation by ballot
Candidate	Ballot 1
Name	Points
Ches Crosbie	2,298.92; 57.47%
Tony Wakeham	1,701.08; 42.53%
Total points	4,000.00

== 2023 leadership convention ==
On March 27, 2021, Premier Andrew Furey was re-elected with a slim majority. Ches Crosbie, the party's leader, lost his seat in Windsor Lake to Liberal candidate John Hogan. A leadership election was called to replace Crosbie who resigned. The leadership convention was held on October 13 – 15, 2023 at the Sheraton Hotel in St. John’s. Candidate nominations opened May 17, 2023, and closed June 16, 2023. More than 10,000 people signed up to support the PC party and were able to vote in this leadership race. Ultimately, 92 per cent of eligible voters participated. On October 14, 2023, MHA Tony Wakeham was elected leader.

(Voting Held October 4-14, 2023)

= Eliminated from next round
= Winner

Point allocation by ballot
Candidate	Ballot 1	Ballot 2
Name	Votes	Votes
Tony Wakeham	1,816; 45.4%	2,091; 52.0%
Eugene Manning	1,636; 40.9%	1,909; 48.0%
Lloyd Parrott	548; 13.7%	Eliminated
Total Points	4,000.00	4,000.00

== See also ==
- Leadership convention
- Progressive Conservative Party of Newfoundland and Labrador
