= Harold Andrews (politician) =

Canadian broadcaster and politician (1942–1995)

Hal Andrews

Minister of Environment
- In office March 31, 1981 – April 2, 1985
- Premier: Brian Peckford
- Preceded by: Ron Dawe
- Succeeded by: John Butt

Minister of Culture, Recreation, and Youth
- In office March 31, 1981 – May 7, 1982
- Premier: Brian Peckford
- Preceded by: Ron Dawe
- Succeeded by: Len Simms

Member of the Newfoundland House of Assembly for Burgeo-Bay d'Espoir
- In office November 29, 1979 – April 2, 1985
- Preceded by: Roger Simmons
- Succeeded by: Dave Gilbert

Personal details
- Born: Harold Dominey Andrews; August 8, 1942 Twillingate, Newfoundland
- Died: March 11, 1995 (aged 52) St. John's, Newfoundland, Canada
- Party: Progressive Conservative
- Spouse: Marbeth Magnusson
- Education: Memorial University of Newfoundland
- Profession: Television commentator

Harold Dominey "Hal" Andrews (August 8, 1942 – March 11, 1995) is a former Canadian broadcaster and politician in Newfoundland. He represented Burgeo-Bay d'Espoir in the Newfoundland House of Assembly from 1979 to 1985.

== Background ==
Andrews was born in Twillingate and was educated at Bishop Feild College and Memorial University. Andrews worked for the Newfoundland Department of Agriculture, Forestry, Provincial Affairs and Fisheries. In 1966, he joined the CBNT-DT as a commentator-producer, and he was the host of Land and Sea during the 1970s.

== Politics ==
Andrews left broadcasting in 1979 to contest a Newfoundland House of Assembly by-election as the Progressive Conservative candidate for the district of Burgeo-Bay d'Espoir. He won the election and served in the provincial cabinet of Brian Peckford as Minister of Environment and Minister of Culture, Recreation and Youth. He was defeated by David Gilbert when he ran for reelection in 1985.
