= Gerry Ottenheimer =

Canadian politician (1934–1998)

The Honourable Gerry Ottenheimer QC

Speaker pro tempore of the Senate of Canada
- In office December 7, 1992 – January 18, 1998
- Preceded by: Rhéal Bélisle
- Succeeded by: Rose-Marie Losier-Cool

Senator from Newfoundland
- In office December 30, 1987 – January 18, 1998
- Preceded by: Frederick William Rowe
- Succeeded by: Joan Cook

Leader of the Opposition (Newfoundland)
- In office 1967–1969
- Preceded by: Noel Murphy
- Succeeded by: Frank Moores

Leader of the Progressive Conservative Party of Newfoundland
- In office 1967–1969
- Preceded by: Noel Murphy
- Succeeded by: Frank Moores
Provincial ministerial and legislative offices
Minister of Energy
In office February 19, 1987 – December 30, 1987
Premier	Brian Peckford
Succeeded by	Brian Peckford
Minister of Intergovernmental Affairs
In office April 24, 1985 – February 19, 1987
Premier	Brian Peckford
Preceded by	Alex Hickman
Succeeded by	Brian Peckford
Minister of Labour
In office January 15, 1985 – April 24, 1985
Premier	Brian Peckford
Preceded by	Jerome Dinn
Succeeded by	Ted Blanchard
Minister of Justice
In office July 3, 1979 – April 24, 1985
Premier	Brian Peckford
Preceded by	Alex Hickman
Succeeded by	Lynn Verge
31st Speaker of the Newfoundland House of Assembly
In office 1975–1979
Preceded by	James Russell
Succeeded by	Len Simms
Minister of Education Education and Youth (1972–1973)
In office December 1, 1972 – October 10, 1975
Premier	Frank Moores
Preceded by	Jerome Dinn
Succeeded by	Ted Blanchard
Minister without portfolio
In office January 18, 1972 – December 1, 1972
Premier	Frank Moores
Member of the Newfoundland House of Assembly for Waterford-Kenmount
In office September 16, 1975 – December 30, 1987
Preceded by	John A. Carter (as MHA for St. John's North)
Succeeded by	Eric Gullage
Member of the Newfoundland House of Assembly for St. Mary's
In office October 28, 1971 – September 16, 1975
Preceded by	James M. McGrath
Succeeded by	Walter C. Carter (as MHA for St. Mary's-The Capes)
Member of the Newfoundland House of Assembly for St. John's East
In office September 8, 1966 – June 26, 1970
Preceded by	James Greene
Succeeded by	William Marshall

Personal details
- Born: Gerald Ryan Ottenheimer; June 4, 1934 London, England
- Died: January 18, 1998 (aged 63)
- Party: Progressive Conservative
- Spouse: Alma Cullimore
- Children: 4 daughters
- Relatives: John Ottenheimer (half-brother); Helen Conway-Ottenheimer (half-sister-in-law); Ed Byrne (son-in-law); James M. Ryan (grandfather)
- Education: University of Rome; University of Paris; University of Cambridge; Memorial University of Newfoundland; Fordham University
- Occupation: Lawyer

Gerald Ryan Ottenheimer QC (June 4, 1934 – January 18, 1998) was a British-born Canadian politician and Senator.

== Family and education ==
Ottenheimer was the scion of one of Newfoundland's wealthiest families. His grandfather was prosperous fishing magnate James M. Ryan. He was born London, England, the son of Frederick and Marguerite (Ryan) Ottenheimer. He was educated at the University of Rome, University of Paris, University of Cambridge, Memorial University of Newfoundland, and Fordham University.

== Provincial politics (1965–1987) ==
Ottenheimer ran unsuccessfully as a Progressive Conservative in the 1965 federal election in the Newfoundland and Labrador riding of St. John's West.

In 1966, he was elected to the Newfoundland and Labrador House of Assembly as one of three Progressive Conservative Party of Newfoundland and Labrador during the Joey Smallwood electoral sweep. During his 16 years as an MHA, he was party leader, Leader of the Opposition from 1967 to 1969, served in the cabinets of Premiers Frank Moores and Brian Peckford, and was Speaker of the Newfoundland and Labrador House of Assembly.

== Federal politics (1987–1998) ==
In 1987, he was appointed to the Senate by Brian Mulroney representing the senatorial division of Waterford-Trinity, Newfoundland. From 1992 to 1998, he was the Speaker pro tempore. He died of cancer while in office in 1998.

He was married to Alma and had four daughters, Geraldine, Suzanne, Bernadette and Ann Marie. His half-brother is former MHA John Ottenheimer and he was the father-in-law of former Progressive Conservative Party leader Ed Byrne.
