= Haig Young =

Canadian politician (1928–2019)

D. Haig Young

Minister of Public works and Services
- In office March 27, 1979 – January 9, 1988
- Preceded by: Charlie Brett
- Succeeded by: Hugh Twomey

MHA for Harbour Grace
- In office 1972–1989
- Preceded by: Hubert Kitchen
- Succeeded by: John Crane

Minister of Consumer Affairs and Communications
- In office January 9, 1988 – March 27, 1989
- Preceded by: James Russell
- Succeeded by: Lynn Verge

Personal details
- Born: April 13, 1928 Upper Island Cove, Newfoundland and Labrador
- Died: March 14, 2019 (aged 90) Langley, British Columbia
- Party: Progressive Conservative Party of Newfoundland and Labrador
- Occupation: funeral director

Douglas Haig Young (April 13, 1928 – March 14, 2019) was a Canadian politician. He represented the electoral district of Harbour Grace in the Newfoundland and Labrador House of Assembly from 1972 to 1989. He was a member of the Progressive Conservative Party of Newfoundland and Labrador. He was a former Minister of Public Works of Newfoundland and Labrador. Born in Upper Island Cove, he was a funeral director and had two children.
