= Kilbride (electoral district) =

Former provincial electoral district in Newfoundland and Labrador, Canada

Newfoundland and Labrador electoral district
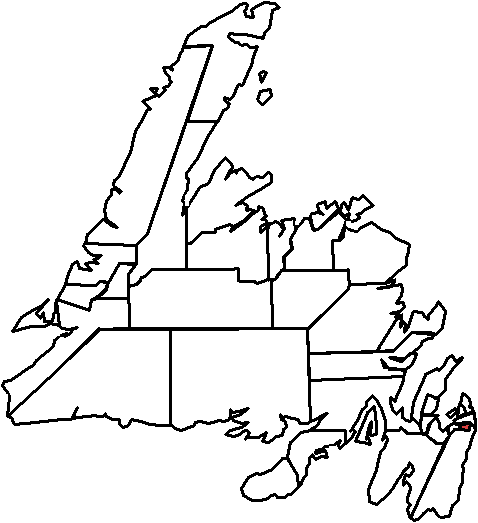
- Kilbride in relation to other districts in Newfoundland

Defunct provincial electoral district
- Legislature: Newfoundland and Labrador House of Assembly
- District created: 1975
- First contested: 1975
- Last contested: 2011

Demographics
- Population (2006): 11,701
- Electors (2011): 10,251

Kilbride is a defunct provincial electoral district for the House of Assembly of Newfoundland and Labrador, Canada. In 2011, there were 10,251 eligible voters living within the district.

The district was created prior to the 1975 election out of parts of St. John's South and St. John's North. It was abolished in 2015 and replaced by Waterford Valley, Mount Pearl-Southlands, Ferryland, Mount Pearl North, and St. John's West.

The district made up the southern portion of the city of St. John's, including the rural neighbourhoods of the Goulds, and Kilbride. Agriculture was an important industry in the district.

It was one of the strongest Progressive Conservative (PC) districts in the Newfoundland and Labrador, voting 85% for the Tories in the 2007 election. Since its creation, it had always returned a PC MHA to the House of Assembly.

== Members of the House of Assembly ==
The district has elected the following members of the House of Assembly:

Assembly	Years	Member	Party
37th	1975–1979	Robert Wells	Progressive Conservative
38th	1979–1982	Bob Aylward	Progressive Conservative
39th	1982–1985	Bob Aylward	Progressive Conservative
40th	1985–1989	Bob Aylward	Progressive Conservative
41st	1989–1993	Bob Aylward	Progressive Conservative
42nd	1993–1996	Ed Byrne	Progressive Conservative
43rd	1996–1999	Ed Byrne	Progressive Conservative
43rd	1999–2003	Ed Byrne	Progressive Conservative
44th	2003–2007	Ed Byrne	Progressive Conservative
45th	2007–2011	John Dinn	Progressive Conservative
46th	2011–2015	John Dinn	Progressive Conservative

== Election results ==
2011 Newfoundland and Labrador general election
Party	Candidate	Votes	%	±%
Progressive Conservative	John Dinn	3,347	58.43	-26.05
New Democratic	Paul Boundridge	1,927	33.64	+25.64
Liberal	Brian Hanlon	454	7.93	+1.00
Total valid votes		5,728	99.81	
Total rejected ballots		11	0.19	-0.11
Turnout		5,739	55.10	-2.25
Eligible voters		10,416		
Progressive Conservative hold		Swing		-25.84

2007 Newfoundland and Labrador general election
Party	Candidate	Votes	%	±%
Progressive Conservative	John Dinn	4,443	84.48	+5.66
New Democratic	Michelle Broderick	421	8.01	+1.43
Liberal	Roger Linehan	364	6.92	-7.67
Independent	Paul Perrier	31	0.59	
Total valid votes		5,259	99.70	
Total rejected ballots		16	0.30	-0.07
Turnout		5,275	57.35	+24.43
Eligible voters		9,198		
Progressive Conservative hold		Swing		+2.11

Newfoundland and Labrador provincial by-election, February 8, 2007 Resignation of Ed Byrne
Party	Candidate	Votes	%	±%
Progressive Conservative	John Dinn	2,744	78.83	+0.55
Liberal	Bob Clarke	508	14.59	-1.18
New Democratic	Gemma Schlamp-Hickey	229	6.58	+0.63
Total valid votes		3,481	99.63	
Total rejected ballots		13	0.37	+0.17
Turnout		3,494	32.92	-37.63
Eligible voters		10,615		
Progressive Conservative hold		Swing		+0.87

2003 Newfoundland and Labrador general election
Party	Candidate	Votes	%	±%
Progressive Conservative	Ed Byrne	5,315	78.28	+16.28
Liberal	Joe Wadden	1,071	15.77	-16.13
New Democratic	David Reynolds	404	5.95	+1.63
Total valid votes		6,790	99.79	
Total rejected ballots		14	0.21	+0.01
Turnout		6,804	70.54	-7.04
Eligible voters		9,645		
Progressive Conservative hold		Swing		+16.21

1999 Newfoundland general election
Party	Candidate	Votes	%	±%
Progressive Conservative	Ed Byrne	4,145	62.00	+14.32
Liberal	Barbara Howlett	2,133	31.90	-14.77
New Democratic	Lee Ingram	289	4.32	-1.34
Independent	Vicki Stuckless	119	1.78	
Total valid votes		6,686	99.81	
Total rejected ballots		13	0.19	+0.03
Turnout		6,699	77.58	+0.08
Eligible voters		8,635		
Progressive Conservative hold		Swing		+14.54

1996 Newfoundland general election
Party	Candidate	Votes	%	±%
Progressive Conservative	Ed Byrne	3,185	47.67	+0.75
Liberal	Gerry Glavine	3,118	46.67	+7.63
New Democratic	Mary Snow	378	5.66	-8.38
Total valid votes		6,681	99.84	
Total rejected ballots		11	0.16	-0.06
Turnout		6,692	77.60	-9.27
Eligible voters		8,635		
Progressive Conservative hold		Swing		-3.44

1993 Newfoundland general election
Party	Candidate	Votes	%	±%
Progressive Conservative	Edward J. Byrne	3,709	46.92	-2.16
Liberal	Gerald Glavine	3,086	39.04	-3.05
New Democratic	Wayne Lucas	1,110	14.04	+5.21
Total valid votes		7,905	99.77	
Total rejected ballots		18	0.23	-0.07
Turnout		7,923	86.77	+9.52
Eligible voters		9,131		
Progressive Conservative hold		Swing		+0.44

1989 Newfoundland general election
Party	Candidate	Votes	%	±%
Progressive Conservative	Robert Aylward	3,452	49.08	-7.63
Liberal	Gerry Glavine	2,960	42.09	+24.00
New Democratic	Kevin Janes	621	8.83	-16.37
Total valid votes		7,033	99.70	
Total rejected ballots		21	0.30	+0.00
Turnout		7,054	77.25	+1.21
Eligible voters		9,131		
Progressive Conservative hold		Swing		-15.81

1985 Newfoundland general election
Party	Candidate	Votes	%	±%
Progressive Conservative	Robert Aylward	3,668	56.71	-24.74
New Democratic	Alfred J. Sullivan	1,630	25.20	
Liberal	Joseph Sala	1,170	18.09	-0.47
Total valid votes		6,468	99.71	
Total rejected ballots		19	0.29	-0.26
Turnout		6,487	76.04	+3.38
Eligible voters		8,531		
Progressive Conservative hold		Swing		-24.97

== See also ==
- List of Newfoundland and Labrador provincial electoral districts
- Canadian provincial electoral districts
