= John McLennon (politician) =

Canadian politician

John Thomas McLennon (born July 9, 1948) is a businessman and former politician in Newfoundland. He represented Windsor-Buchans in the Newfoundland House of Assembly from 1982 to 1985.

The son of Thomas McLennon and Catherine Conway, he was born in Placentia and was educated in Grand Falls. McLennon married Glennis L. Locke in 1967.

He was elected to the Newfoundland assembly in 1982. McLennon was defeated by Graham Flight when he ran for reelection in 1985.
