= Harold Small =

Canadian politician (1936–2021)

Harold Small MHA

Member of the Newfoundland House of Assembly for Baie Verte-White Bay
- In office 15 October 1991 – 3 May 1993
- Preceded by: Tom Rideout
- Succeeded by: Paul Shelley

Personal details
- Born: February 13, 1936 Wild Cove, White Bay, Newfoundland
- Died: May 17, 2021 (aged 85) Wild Cove, White Bay, Newfoundland and Labrador, Canada
- Party: Liberal
- Spouses: Jean Simms; Maxine Butler (m. 1978)
- Profession: Fisherman

Harold Norman George Small (February 13, 1936 – May 17, 2021) was a Newfoundlander and Canadian politician. He served as the member of the Newfoundland House of Assembly (MHA) for Baie Verte-White Bay from 1991 to 1993.

== Background ==
Small was born in the fishing village of Wild Cove as the son of George and Bessie Small. He initially worked at the Advocate Mines in Baie Verte. Following the death of his first wife and one of his sons, he returned to Wild Cove with his brothers in 1972 to work as a fisherman and sealer so that he could "be [his] own boss."

Small was appointed to the Fisheries Loan Board in 1978 by provincial Minister of Fisheries Walter C. Carter as its representative in the "North East Coast." He was one of the founding members of the Canadian Sealers' Association, a cooperative which was established in 1982 in response to the anti-seal hunt protests led by Greenpeace. He was also a director of the Newfoundland and Labrador Rural Development Association in 1983.

== Politics ==
Small ran as the Liberal candidate for the district of Baie Verte-White Bay in the 1985 election, which he lost to incumbent Progressive Conservative (PC) MHA Tom Rideout. When Rideout resigned from the House of Assembly in 1990 after being appointed to the Immigration and Refugee Board of Canada, Small successfully ran as the Liberal candidate in the subsequent by-election to succeed him. He was appointed to the Resource Committee by Premier Clyde Wells. In the 1993 general election, he was defeated by his PC opponent Paul Shelley.

Small thereafter went into retirement in Wild Cove, where he died on May 17, 2021.

== Electoral history ==
1993 Newfoundland general election: Baie Verte-White Bay
Party	Candidate	Votes	%	±%
Progressive Conservative	Paul Shelley	3,172	62.48	–
Liberal	Harold Small	1,830	36.04	–
New Democratic	Rose Howe	75	1.48	–
Total valid votes		5,077	99.82	
Total rejected ballots		9	0.18	–
Total votes		5,086	73.27	–
Eligible voters		6,941		
Progressive Conservative gain from Liberal		Swing		–

1985 Newfoundland general election: Baie Verte-White Bay
Party	Candidate	Votes	%	±%
Progressive Conservative	Tom Rideout	2,532	51.87	▼4.19
Liberal	Harold Small	2,127	43.58	▼0.36
New Democratic	Richard Shelley	222	4.55	–
Total valid votes		4,881	99.73	
Total rejected ballots		13	0.27	
Total votes		4,894	82.42	▲8.33
Eligible voters		5,938		
Progressive Conservative hold		Swing		▼2.28
