= Harold Starkes =

Canadian businessman and politician

Member of the Newfoundland House of Assembly for Green Bay
- In office October 28, 1971 – March 24, 1972
- Preceded by: William R. Smallwood
- Succeeded by: Brian Peckford

Member of the Newfoundland House of Assembly for Lewisporte
- In office November 19, 1962 – October 28, 1971
- Preceded by: Leslie Curtis (as MHA for Twillingate)
- Succeeded by: James Russell

Personal details
- Born: Harold Eric James Starkes; February 12, 1917 Nipper's Harbour, Newfoundland
- Died: 1993 (aged 75–76)
- Party: Liberal
- Spouse: Muriel Noble
- Relations: Roland G. Starkes (father)
- Occupation: Businessman

Harold Eric James Starkes (March 12, 1917 – 1993) was a Canadian businessperson and politician from Newfoundland. He represented Lewisporte from 1962 to 1971 in the Newfoundland House of Assembly.

The son of Roland G. Starkes and Mary Noble, he was born in Nipper's Harbour and was educated at Prince of Wales College. Starkes married Muriel Hazel Noble. He worked as a Newfoundland forestry officer and then, in 1948, became managing director of the Northern Trading Company, serving in that position until 1952. He also was president of R. G. Starkes and Sons Ltd. and of Notre Dame Agencies Ltd.

Starkes was a member of the municipal council for Lewisporte, serving as deputy mayor from 1955 to 1958 and as mayor from 1958 to 1960. He was also president of the Newfoundland Federation of Mayors and Municipalities for one term. Starkes was elected to the Newfoundland assembly in 1962 and served in the provincial cabinet as Minister of Highways. He retired from politics in 1972.
