= Harold Barrett =

Canadian politician (1935–2018)

Harold Hal Barrett

MHA For St. John's West
- In office 1979–1989
- Preceded by: Hubert Kitchen
- Succeeded by: Rex Gibbons

Minister of Development
- In office April 24, 1985 – March 27, 1989
- Preceded by: Neil Windsor
- Succeeded by: Len Simms

Minister of finance
- In office March 27, 1989 – May 5, 1989
- Preceded by: Neil Windsor
- Succeeded by: Hubert Kitchen

Personal details
- Born: September 4, 1935
- Died: December 4, 2018 (aged 83)

Harold Matthew Barrett (September 4, 1935 – December 4, 2018) was a Canadian marine insurance executive and politician in Newfoundland. He represented St. John's West in the Newfoundland House of Assembly from 1979 to 1989.

He was born in St. John's, Newfoundland and Labrador.

He was elected to the Newfoundland assembly in 1979, defeating Liberal Hubert Kitchen. Barrett was reelected in 1982 and 1985. He ran unsuccessfully for the Progressive Conservative party leadership in 1989. Barrett served in the provincial cabinet as Minister of Development and Tourism and as Minister of Finance. He was defeated when he ran for reelection in 1989, losing to Rex Gibbons. He was named chair of the Newfoundland Dockyards later that same year.

Barrett died on December 4, 2018, at the age of 83.
