= Alvin Hewlett =

Canadian politician (born 1952)

Alvin Hewlett MHA

Member of the Newfoundland House of Assembly for Green Bay
- In office April 20, 1989 – February 22, 1996
- Preceded by: Brian Peckford
- Succeeded by: Graham Flight (as MHA for Windsor-Springdale)

Personal details
- Born: February 3, 1952 (age 74) Port Anson, Newfoundland, Canada
- Party: Progressive Conservative
- Education: Memorial University

Alvin Hewlett (born Feb 3, 1952) is a former politician in Newfoundland. He represented Green Bay in the Newfoundland House of Assembly from 1989 to 1996.

The son of Clifford Hewlett, he was born in Port Anson and was educated at Memorial University. Hewlett was executive assistant and then chief of staff for Brian Peckford.

Hewlett was elected to the Newfoundland assembly in 1989 and was reelected in 1993. He was defeated by Graham Flight when he ran for election in the newly created district of Windsor-Springdale.
