= Upper Island Cove =

- Town
- Location of Upper Island Cove in Newfoundland
- Coordinates: 47°38′50″N 53°13′24″W
- Country: Canada
- Province: Newfoundland and Labrador
- Census division: 1
- Incorporated: October 19, 1965

Population (2021)
  - Total: 1,401
- Time zone: UTC-3:30 (Newfoundland Time)
  - Summer (DST): UTC-2:30 (Newfoundland Daylight)
- Area code: 709

Upper Island Cove, Newfoundland and Labrador is a town in Newfoundland and Labrador, Canada. It is located in Census Division No. 1 and was incorporated on October 19, 1965. It is located northeast of Bay Roberts. As of 2021, the population is 1,401.

== History ==
Upper Island Cove is a unique town both in its physical location and its culture. Built at the bottom of high cliffs, the town was once known as “The Walled City." A number of today's residents are descendants of these early fishermen from England and Ireland.

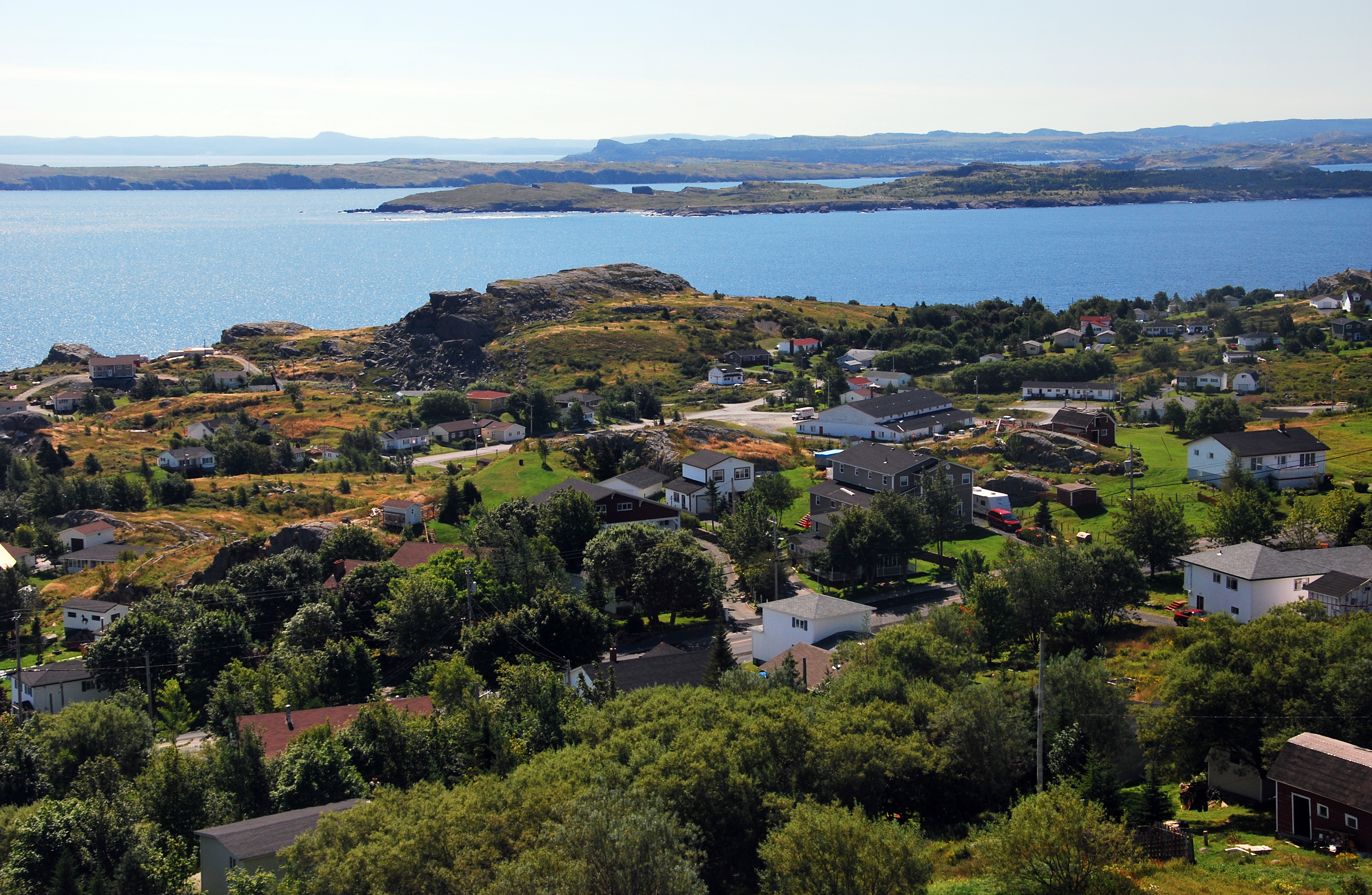
Overlooking Conception Bay

=== Early History 1498 - 1690 ===
It is unknown when the first ever pioneers settled in Upper Island Cove, but we do know it was first inhabited by Portuguese and Basque settlers after John Cabot’s journey to North America in 1497, because of how he described the waters off of the Avalon Peninsula as being “- so thick of cod, that you could scoop them up with a basket.” In a census of the Conception Bay Area in 1675, Upper Island Cove had a total population of 14, Most Portuguese and Basque Settlers.

Most if not all original Portuguese settlers had abandoned Upper Island Cove by 1590, due to aggressive English Colonization and the Anglo-Spanish War, also that Newfoundland was only for seasonal migratory fishing and they had been focusing on imperial power of Brazil and India.

=== Late History 1690 - 1914 ===
In 1690 many new English and Irish Pioneers began focusing more on fishery’s in the Conception Bay Area, In an 1805 Newfoundland Plantation Record, states 3 English and Irish families were the first to lay down permanent land in Upper Island Cove, Those being Young, Crane and Hussey, with the first documentation being from the Young’s in 1690. This small settlement of Upper Island Cove went under many attacks in 1697, during Pierre Le Moyne d’lberville’s pillaging of the Avalon Peninsula in King William’s War. On January 23rd, French and Indigenous attacks on the settlement forced Upper Island Cove Residents to flee into the cold snow covered forest, Upper Island Cove was torched and burned down.

In the 1700s and 1800s more English and Irish settlers began arriving in Upper Island Cove and a Census in 1836 counted 522 Residents, with surnames like Mercer, Lundrigan, Snow, Drover, Coombs, Kings, and Bishops dominating the records.

On February 3rd of 1868, Upper Island Cove was struck with a blizzard unlike ever seen before, the morning was recalled as calm and sunny, which lead to a large group of men to believe it was a safe winter day, they set out to the woods on sled and dogs to cut wood 9 miles inland. Later that evening, a sudden, violent Arctic Blizzard struck the region with zero warning, many residents were caught in the frigid temperatures and snow squalls off guard, and succumbed to frostbite before ever reaching back to the main road.

30 Residents of the Conception Bay Area passed away, with 6 from Upper Island Cove passing away, mostly being members of the Coombs Lineage, hence giving the tragedy the name “Coombs Day”

A later Census again in 1871 counted 970 Residents living in the area, and another in 1901 shows the population dipped to 799 Residents, according to many Residents moving to the mainland of Canada.

=== Involvement in WW1 ===
Many young residents of Upper Island Cove enlisted in August of 1914 after the Dominion of Newfoundland joined World War I, following the invasion of Belgium. Many Island Cove Residents lied about their age, 3 island covers enlisted apart of the first 500 to go overseas such as;

Lance Corporal Nathaniel Crane

Private Harry Coombs

Archibald Coombs

In the Battle of Beaumont Hamel, The Newfoundland Regiment suffered a devastating loss after the 3rd wave of the 29th Division (United Kingdom) which they were apart of in reserve infantry, was commanded to go over the top, in the advance Private Harry Coombs was killed, and Archibald Coombs had to carry his cousin Leinus Coombs to safety, after he had his left leg shattered from an artillery shell in battle.

The war raged on still after the Battle of Beaumont-Hamel, and more young troops from Upper Island Cove died in battle. Such as Lance Corporal Nathaniel Crane, who died in The Battle of Monchy-le-Preux, and Private Nathan Mercer, who died after succumbing to injuries in 1917.

After the war, the town of Upper Island Cove and surrounding areas went into communal grief, 3 residents of Upper Island Cove passed away in battle, and many more left with severe injuries and Post-traumatic stress disorder, it took years for the community to recover.

Today a War memorial stands outside the Anglican Church, honouring those who were killed or wounded in action, not just in World War I, but also the many other veterans from World War II.

=== Modern History ===
In June of 2023, the Coombs Family found hundreds of 550+ Million Year Old Ediacaran fossils at the Inner Meadow Sites in Upper Island Cove, The Initial find occurred while they were looking for runoff sources after a storm in their backyard, which lead to them finding a Petalonamid Fossil on a exposed patch of rock, where they posted it to a Facebook group called “Newfound Fossils”. Researchers from Memorial University excavated the site and discovered 2 new species. They named them Aninoides coombsorum and Edrathina obditchia, Aninoides named in honour of the Coombs Family who found the fossil

== Demographics ==
The population was 942 in 1940; 1,346 in 1951, 1,563 in 1956, and 1,762 in 1966.

In the 2021 Census of Population conducted by Statistics Canada, Upper Island Cove had a population of 1,401 living in 582 of its 669 total private dwellings, a change of −10.2% from its 2016 population of 1,561. With a land area of 7.82 km^{2} (3.02 sq mi), it had a population density of 179.2/km^{2} (464.0/sq mi) in 2021.

== St. Peter's Church and School ==
The Parish of Upper Island Cove is made up of three congregations. St. Peter's, Upper Island Cove; St. John the Evangelist, Bishop's Cove; and St. Andrew's, Bryant's Cove. The Parish dates to 1815 when construction began on the first church building at Upper Island Cove.

Today, Upper Island Cove is one of the largest Anglican Parishes in the Diocese serving over 850 families in the three communities. Each of the Church buildings is unique in architecture and is well maintained. The Parish is served by active Sunday Schools, a Vacation Bible School, J.A., C.L.B., Three A.C.W. Branches, an A.C.A.A., and various Adult Christian Education Programs.

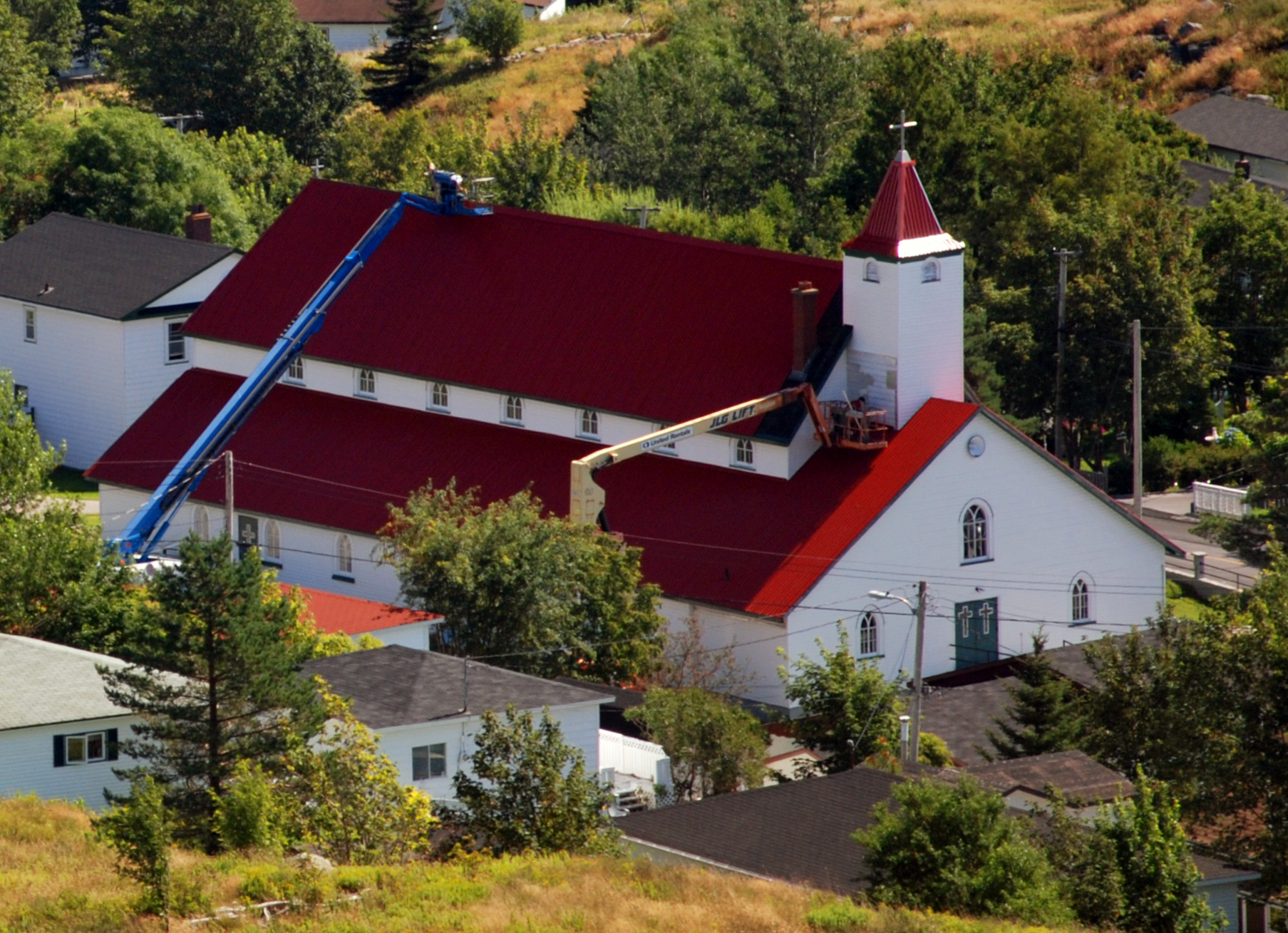
St. Peter's Anglican Church

St. Peter’s School celebrated its 50th anniversary in 2011. It is a part of the Eastern School District, whose main offices are in St. John's. St. Peter's currently has an enrollment of 248 students and offers grades Kindergarten through Grade 9. The average class size is 22.5 students. The school serves the communities of Bishop’s Cove, Bryant’s Cove and Upper Island Cove. Approximately 91% of students are bussed to school on a daily basis. Although its name dates back to the time when there was a denominational school system in Newfoundland and Labrador, and schools were run by various churches, today it is a public school run by John Drover (Principal) and Desmond Spurrell (Vice Principal).

== Local Businesses ==
The Town of Upper Island Cove has many homemade businesses, ranging from Floral Designs, to Mini Marts, the area has many local shops and keepers around for anyone to visit, along with its own Legion.

Popular Businesses such as;

Jays Mini Mart

Clarke Floral Design

Clarke’s Country Corner

UIC Drug Mart

Sharpe’s Sawmill and Building Supplies

Loves Anchor by the Sea.

== Notable people ==
- Craig Sharpe, musician and contestant on season four of Canadian Idol
- Jason Greeley, musician and contestant on season two of Canadian Idol
- Robert Slaney, ice hockey centre
- John Lundrigan, member of the Newfoundland and Labrador House of Assembly and House of Commons
- Haig Young, member of the Newfoundland and Labrador House of Assembly

== See also ==
- List of cities and towns in Newfoundland and Labrador
