= Barry Hynes =

Canadian politician

MHA for Trinity North
- In office 1989–1991
- Preceded by: Charlie Brett
- Succeeded by: Doug Oldford

Personal details
- Born: c. 1945 (age 80–81)
- Party: Progressive Conservative Party of Newfoundland and Labrador
- Occupation: business administrator

Barry Hynes (born c. 1945) was a Canadian politician. He represented the electoral district of Trinity North in the Newfoundland and Labrador House of Assembly from 1989 to 1991. He was a member of the Progressive Conservative Party of Newfoundland and Labrador. He resigned on December 3, 1990 after being convicted of sexual assault.
