= Grand Falls-Windsor-Green Bay South =

Former provincial electoral district in Newfoundland and Labrador, Canada

Newfoundland and Labrador electoral district
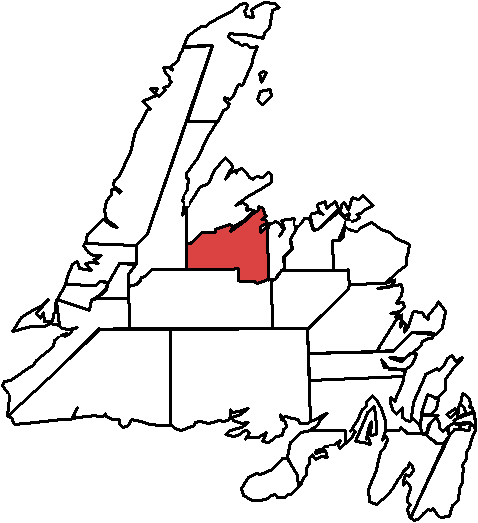
- Grand Falls-Windsor-Green Bay South in relation to other districts in Newfoundland

Defunct provincial electoral district
- Legislature: Newfoundland and Labrador House of Assembly
- District created: 2006
- First contested: 2007
- Last contested: 2011

Demographics
- Population (2006): 9,960
- Electors (2011): 7,004

Grand Falls-Windsor—Green Bay South, formerly known as Windsor—Springdale, is a defunct provincial electoral district for the House of Assembly of Newfoundland and Labrador, Canada. In 2011, there were 7,004 eligible voters living within the district.

It was in Central Newfoundland, on the shore of Notre Dame Bay. It included part of the town of Grand Falls-Windsor. Other communities included South Brook, Beaumont, as well as Triton Island, Pelley's Island, Long Island, and Sunday Cove Island.

The former district of Green Bay was represented by former Premier Brian Peckford (1979–1989).

The district was abolished in 2015 and was succeeded by the new districts of Grand Falls-Windsor-Buchans and Baie Verte-Green Bay.

== Members of the House of Assembly ==
Member	Party	Term
Ray Hunter	Progressive Conservative	1999–2015
Graham Flight	Liberal	1989–1999
Clyde Wells	Liberal	1987–1989
Graham Flight	Liberal	1985–1987
John McLennon	Progressive Conservative	1982–1985
Graham Flight	Liberal	1975–1982

=== Green Bay ===
Member	Party	Term
Alvin Hewlett	Progressive Conservative	1989–1996
Brian Peckford	Progressive Conservative	1972–1989
Harold Starkes	Liberal	1971–1972
William R. Smallwood	Liberal	1956–1971
Baxter Morgan	Liberal	1949–1956

== Election results ==
2011 Newfoundland and Labrador general election
Party	Candidate	Votes	%	±%
Progressive Conservative	Ray Hunter	2,131	57.38%	–
Liberal	Merv Wiseman	1,165	31.37%	
NDP	Clyde Bridger	418	11.25%	

2007 Newfoundland and Labrador general election
Party	Candidate	Votes	%	±%
Progressive Conservative	Ray Hunter	2,620	69.22%	–
Liberal	Aubrey Smith	973	25.71%	
NDP	John L. Whelan	192	5.07%	

=== Green Bay ===
1993 Newfoundland general election
Party	Candidate	Votes	%	±%
Progressive Conservative	Alvin Hewlett	2,671	49.98	-8.87
Liberal	Ray Whalen	1,679	31.42	-9.73
Independent	Wilfred Bartlett	522	9.77	
New Democratic	Wayne Budgell	472	8.83	
Total valid votes		5,344	99.87	
Total rejected ballots		7	0.13	-0.20
Turnout		5,351	75.19	+2.29
Eligible voters		7,117		
Progressive Conservative hold		Swing		+0.43

1989 Newfoundland general election
Party	Candidate	Votes	%	±%
Progressive Conservative	Alvin Hewlett	3,043	58.85	-9.71
Liberal	Maurice Budgell	2,128	41.15	+15.66
Total valid votes		5,171	99.67	
Total rejected ballots		17	0.33	+0.08
Turnout		5,188	72.90	+2.54
Eligible voters		7,117		
Progressive Conservative hold		Swing		-12.69

1985 Newfoundland general election
Party	Candidate	Votes	%	±%
Progressive Conservative	Brian Peckford	3,373	68.56	-9.80
Liberal	Renold E. Clarke	1,254	25.49	+3.84
New Democratic	Mervyn W. Poole	293	5.96	
Total valid votes		4,920	99.76	
Total rejected ballots		12	0.24	+0.06
Turnout		4,932	70.36	-0.20
Eligible voters		7,010		
Progressive Conservative hold		Swing		-6.82

1982 Newfoundland general election
Party	Candidate	Votes	%	±%
Progressive Conservative	Brian Peckford	3,338	78.36	+1.32
Liberal	Munden Derek Batstone	922	21.64	-0.07
Total valid votes		4,260	99.81	
Total rejected ballots		8	0.19	-0.01
Turnout		4,268	70.56	-4.74
Eligible voters		6,049		
Progressive Conservative hold		Swing		+0.70

1979 Newfoundland general election
Party	Candidate	Votes	%	±%
Progressive Conservative	Brian Peckford	3,502	77.03	+6.70
Liberal	Maurice Budgell	987	21.71	-5.69
New Democratic	Brian M. Walsh	57	1.25	-1.01
Total valid votes		4,546	99.80	
Total rejected ballots		9	0.20	-0.04
Turnout		4,555	75.30	+8.70
Eligible voters		6,049		
Progressive Conservative hold		Swing		+6.19

1975 Newfoundland general election
Party	Candidate	Votes	%	±%
Progressive Conservative	Brian Peckford	2,639	70.34	+18.98
Liberal	H. Corbin Clarke	1,028	27.40	-21.25
New Democratic	Harold J. Card	85	2.27	
Total valid votes		3,752	99.76	
Total rejected ballots		9	0.24	-0.08
Turnout		3,761	66.60	-18.02
Eligible voters		5,647		
Progressive Conservative hold		Swing		+20.11

1972 Newfoundland general election
Party	Candidate	Votes	%	±%
Progressive Conservative	Brian Peckford	2,560	51.35	+12.85
Liberal	Harold Starkes	2,425	48.65	-7.73
Total valid votes		4,985	99.68	
Total rejected ballots		16	0.32	-0.39
Turnout		5,001	84.62	+10.29
Eligible voters		5,910		
Progressive Conservative gain from Liberal		Swing		+10.29

1971 Newfoundland general election
Party	Candidate	Votes	%	±%
Liberal	Harold Starkes	2,687	56.38	-14.79
Progressive Conservative	Aubrey Rolfe	1,835	38.50	+9.67
New Democratic	Harold Card	244	5.12	
Total valid votes		4,766	99.29	
Total rejected ballots		34	0.71	+0.23
Turnout		4,800	81.22	+15.74
Eligible voters		5,910		
Liberal hold		Swing		-12.23
Source(s) "1971 Newfoundland and Labrador Election". Canadian Elections Database.

== See also ==
- List of Newfoundland and Labrador provincial electoral districts
- Canadian provincial electoral districts
