= James Russell (Newfoundland politician) =

Canadian educator and politician (born 1940)

The Honourable James Russell ECNL

Minister of Environment and Lands
- In office January 9, 1988 – March 27, 1989
- Premier: Brian Peckford
- Preceded by: Len Simms (as Minister of Forest Resources and Lands)
- Succeeded by: John Butt

Minister of Consumer Affairs and Environment
- In office April 24, 1985 – January 9, 1988
- Premier: Brian Peckford
- Preceded by: Hazel Newhook
- Succeeded by: Haig Young

30th Speaker of the Newfoundland House of Assembly
- In office 1982–1985
- Preceded by: Len Simms
- Succeeded by: Patrick McNicholas
- In office 1972–1975
- Preceded by: George Clarke
- Succeeded by: Gerry Ottenheimer

Member of the Newfoundland House of Assembly for Lewisporte
- In office April 6, 1982 – April 20, 1989
- Preceded by: Freeman White
- Succeeded by: Melvin Penney
- In office October 28, 1971 – September 16, 1975
- Preceded by: Harold Starkes
- Succeeded by: Freeman White

Personal details
- Born: Maxwell James Russell; September 4, 1940 (age 86) Lewisporte, Newfoundland
- Party: Progressive Conservative
- Spouse: Mary Buffett
- Education: Memorial University
- Occupation: Teacher

Maxwell James Russell (born 4 September 1940) is an educator and former political figure in Newfoundland and Labrador, Canada. He represented Lewisporte in the Newfoundland and Labrador House of Assembly from 1971 to 1975 and from 1982 to 1989 as a Progressive Conservative.

== Biography ==
Russell was born in Lewisporte, the son of William Stewart Russell and Blanche Burt, and was educated there and at Memorial University. He taught school in Comfort Cove and Lewisporte. Russell married Mary Buffett. Before entering provincial politics, Russell served on the town council for Lewisporte. He was defeated when he ran for reelection to the House of Assembly in 1975. From 1977 to 1982, he was personnel manager for the Newfoundland and Labrador Housing Corporation. Russell was speaker for the House of Assembly from 1972 to 1975 and from 1982 to 1985. He served in the provincial cabinet as Minister of Consumer Affairs and Communications and as Minister of the Environment. Russell retired from politics in 1989.
