= John Crane (Canadian politician) =

Canadian politician

MHA for Harbour Grace
- In office 1989–1995
- Preceded by: Haig Young
- Succeeded by: district abolished

Personal details
- Born: April 7, 1935 Upper Island Cove, Dominion of Newfoundland
- Died: July 29, 2021 Carbonear, Newfoundland and Labrador
- Party: Liberal Party of Newfoundland and Labrador
- Occupation: businessman

John Crane (April 7, 1935 – July 29, 2021) is a Canadian politician. He represented the electoral district of Harbour Grace in the Newfoundland and Labrador House of Assembly from 1989 to 1995. He is a member of the Liberal Party of Newfoundland and Labrador. He is a businessman.
