= Glenn Tobin =

Canadian politician

The Honourable Glenn Tobin ECNL

Minister of Government Services
- In office March 27, 1989 – May 5, 1989
- Preceded by: Office Established
- Succeeded by: Office Abolished

MHA for Burin-Placentia West
- In office 1982–1996
- Preceded by: Don Hollett
- Succeeded by: Mary Hodder

Minister of Social Services
- In office January 9, 1988 – March 27, 1989
- Preceded by: Charlie Brett
- Succeeded by: Ron Dawe

Personal details
- Born: November 19, 1950 (age 75) Trepassey, Newfoundland and Labrador
- Party: Progressive Conservative Party of Newfoundland and Labrador

Glenn G. Tobin (born November 19, 1950) was a Canadian politician. He represented the electoral district of Burin-Placentia West in the Newfoundland and Labrador House of Assembly from 1982 to 1996. He was a member of the Progressive Conservative Party of Newfoundland and Labrador.

Tobin worked as a social worker in Marystown, Newfoundland and Labrador, where he also served as a town councillor and deputy mayor. He was elected to the Newfoundland assembly in 1982. He served in the provincial cabinet as Minister of Social Services, and Works and Minister of Services and Transportation. Tobin also served as deputy opposition house leader.

After leaving politics, he became manager and operator of Island Trucking Ltd. In 2004, he was named chair of the Newfoundland and Labrador Liquor Corporation.
