= Burin-Placentia West =

Former provincial electoral district in Newfoundland and Labrador, Canada

Coordinates: 47.37°N 55.00°W

Newfoundland and Labrador electoral district
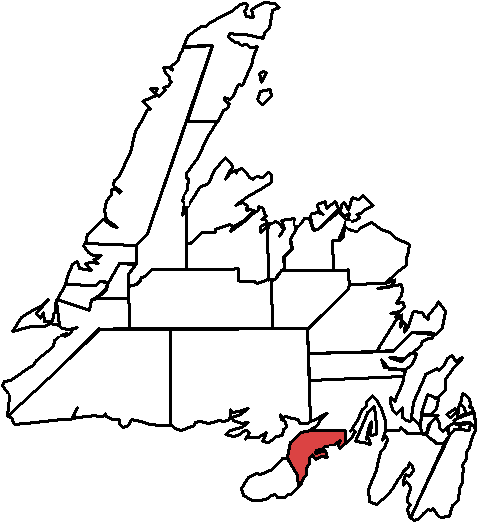
- Burin-Placentia West in relation to other districts in Newfoundland

Defunct provincial electoral district
- Legislature: Newfoundland and Labrador House of Assembly
- District created: 1949
- First contested: 1949
- Last contested: 2011

Demographics
- Population (2006): 11,444
- Electors (2011): 7,673

Burin-Placentia West was a provincial electoral district for the House of Assembly of Newfoundland and Labrador, Canada. The district was known as Placentia West prior to 1975. In 2011 there were 7,673 eligible voters living within the district.

It was Primarily a fishing district with the Marystown Shipyard and offshore fabrication yard an important part of the economy. Like many other districts, it had faced tough economic times.

The main communities are Marystown, Burin, and Rushoon.

Other communities include Baine Harbour, Beau Bois, Boat Harbour, Brookside, Fox Cove-Mortier, Garnish Pond, Jean de Baie, Parker's Cove, Petite Fort, Port au Bras, Red Harbour, Red Island, Rock Harbour, South East Bight, and Spanish Room.

The district was abolished in 2015 into Placentia West-Bellevue and Burin-Grand Bank.

== Members of the House of Assembly ==
The district has elected the following members of the House of Assembly:

| Assembly | Years | Member | Party |
|---|---|---|---|
| 29th | 1949–1951 | Patrick Canning | Liberal |
| 30th | 1951–1956 | Patrick Canning | Liberal |
| 31st | 1956–1959 | Patrick Canning | Liberal |
| 32nd | 1959–1962 | Patrick Canning | Liberal |
| 33rd | 1962–1966 | Patrick Canning | Liberal |
| 34th | 1966–1971 | Patrick Canning | Liberal |
| 35th | 1971–1972 | Patrick Canning | Liberal |
| 36th | 1972–1975 | Leo Barry | Progressive Conservative |
| 37th | 1975–1979 | Patrick Canning | Liberal |
| 38th | 1979–1982 | Don Hollett | Liberal |
| 39th | 1982–1985 | Glenn Tobin | Progressive Conservative |
| 40th | 1985–1989 | Glenn Tobin | Progressive Conservative |
| 41st | 1989–1993 | Glenn Tobin | Progressive Conservative |
| 42nd | 1993–1996 | Glenn Tobin | Progressive Conservative |
| 43rd | 1996–1999 | Mary Hodder | Liberal |
| 43rd | 1999–2003 | Mary Hodder | Liberal |
| 44th | 2003–2007 | Clyde Jackman | Progressive Conservative |
| 45th | 2007–2011 | Clyde Jackman | Progressive Conservative |
| 46th | 2011–2015 | Clyde Jackman | Progressive Conservative |

== Election results ==
2011 Newfoundland and Labrador general election
| Party | Candidate | Votes | % |
|---|---|---|---|
| Progressive Conservative | Clyde Jackman | 2,538 | 48.45 |
| New Democratic | Julie Mitchell | 2,498 | 47.69 |
| Liberal | Jacqueline Mullett | 202 | 3.86 |
| Total valid votes | | 5,238 | 99.77 |
| Total rejected ballots | | 12 | 0.23 |
| Turnout | | 5,250 | 69.00 |
| Electors on the lists | | 7,591 | – |

2007 Newfoundland and Labrador general election
| Party | Candidate | Votes | % |
|---|---|---|---|
| Progressive Conservative | Clyde Jackman | 3,141 | 59.24 |
| New Democratic | Julie Mitchell | 1,704 | 32.14 |
| Liberal | George Brake | 457 | 8.62 |
| Total valid votes | | 5,302 | 99.73 |
| Total rejected ballots | | 14 | 0.27 |
| Turnout | | 5,316 | 69.36 |
| Electors on the lists | | 7,664 | – |

2003 Newfoundland and Labrador general election
| Party | Candidate | Votes | % | ±% |
|---|---|---|---|---|
| Progressive Conservative | Clyde Jackman | 3450 | 55.05% | +49.18% |
| Liberal | Sam Synard | 2133 | 34.03% | -19.27% |
| NDP | Wayne Butler | 684 | 10.91% | -35.79% |

1999 Newfoundland and Labrador general election
| Party | Candidate | Votes | % | ±% |
|---|---|---|---|---|
| Liberal | Mary Hodder | 3469 | 53.30% | -18.99% |
| NDP | Wayne Butler | 2658 | 40.83% | +40.83% |
| Progressive Conservative | Dominic Lundrigan | 382 | 5.87% | -21.84% |

1996 Newfoundland and Labrador general election
| Party | Candidate | Votes | % | ±% |
|---|---|---|---|---|
| Liberal | Mary Hodder | 4944 | 72.29% | |
| Progressive Conservative | Terry Keating | 1895 | 27.71% | – |

== See also ==
- List of Newfoundland and Labrador provincial electoral districts
- Canadian provincial electoral districts
