= Lewisporte (electoral district) =

Former provincial electoral district in Newfoundland and Labrador, Canada

Newfoundland and Labrador electoral district
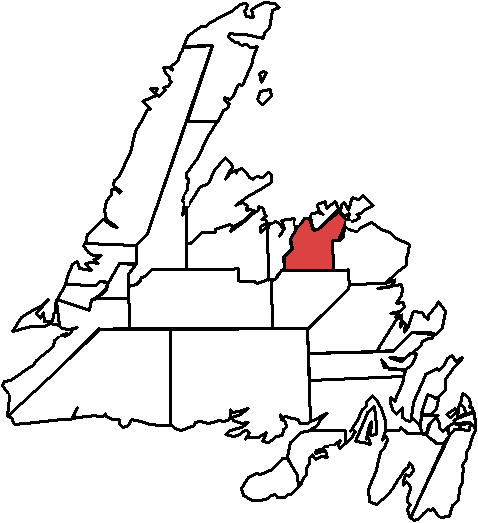
- Lewisporte in relation to other districts in Newfoundland

Defunct provincial electoral district
- Legislature: Newfoundland and Labrador House of Assembly
- District created: 1975
- First contested: 1975
- Last contested: 2011

Demographics
- Population (2006): 10,074
- Electors (2011): 7,797

Lewisporte is a defunct provincial electoral district for the House of Assembly of Newfoundland and Labrador, Canada. In 2011, there were 7,797 eligible voters living within the district. The district was abolished in 2015 and replaced by Lewisporte-Twillingate.

The town of Lewisporte has been a major service centre in this northeastern district, and has many of the votes. Until the 2003 shipping season, it was the southern terminus of the Labrador coastal ferry service. The economy is traditionally dependent on the fishery but farming is also important.

Lewisporte district also includes the communities of Alderburn, Baytona, Birchy Bay, Boyd's Cove, Brown's Arm, Campbellton, Comfort Cove-Newstead, Embree, Horwood, Laurenceton, Little Burnt Bay, Loon Bay, Mason's Cove, Michael's Harbour, Norris Arm, Notre Dame Junction, Port Albert, Porterville, Sandy Point, Stanhope, and Stoneville.

== Members of the House of Assembly ==
The district has elected the following members of the House of Assembly:

Assembly	Years	Member	Party
33rd	1962–1966	Harold Starkes	Liberal
34th	1966–1971	Harold Starkes	Liberal
35th	1971–1972	James Russell	Progressive Conservative
36th	1972–1975	James Russell	Progressive Conservative
37th	1975–1979	Freeman White	Liberal
38th	1979–1982	Freeman White	Liberal
39th	1982–1985	James Russell	Progressive Conservative
40th	1985–1989	James Russell	Progressive Conservative
41st	1989–1993	Melvin Penney	Liberal
42nd	1993–1996	Melvin Penney	Liberal
43rd	1996–1999	Melvin Penney	Liberal
43rd	1999–2003	Tom Rideout	Progressive Conservative
44th	2003–2007	Tom Rideout	Progressive Conservative
45th	2007–2011	Wade Verge	Progressive Conservative
46th	2011–2015	Wade Verge	Progressive Conservative

== Election results ==
2011 Newfoundland and Labrador general election
Party	Candidate	Votes	%	±%
Progressive Conservative	Wade Verge	2450	56.60%	–
NDP	Lloyd Snow	988	22.82%	
Liberal	Todd Manuel	891	20.58%	

2007 Newfoundland and Labrador general election
Party	Candidate	Votes	%	±%
Progressive Conservative	Wade Verge	2660	70.61%	–
Liberal	Jack Martin	647	17.18%	
NDP	Garry Vatcher	460	12.21%	

2003 Newfoundland and Labrador general election
Party	Candidate	Votes	%	±%
Progressive Conservative	Tom Rideout	3503	70.95%	–
Liberal	P. Todd Manue	1275	25.83%	
Independent	Garry Vatcher	159	3.22%	

1999 Newfoundland and Labrador general election
Party	Candidate	Votes	%	±%
Progressive Conservative	Tom Rideout	3791	62.8%	–
Liberal	Melvin Penney	2116	35.0%	
NDP	Michael Dwyer	125	2.1%	

== See also ==
- List of Newfoundland and Labrador provincial electoral districts
- Canadian provincial electoral districts
