= Len Simms =

Canadian politician (1943–2026)

The Honourable Len Simms ECNL

Leader of the Opposition
- In office 1991–1995
- Preceded by: Tom Rideout
- Succeeded by: Lynn Verge

Leader of the Progressive Conservative Party of Newfoundland
- In office 1991–1995
- Preceded by: Tom Rideout
- Succeeded by: Lynn Verge

Speaker of the Newfoundland House of Assembly
- In office 1979–1982
- Preceded by: Gerry Ottenheimer
- Succeeded by: James Russell

MHA for Grand Falls
- In office 1979–1995
- Preceded by: John Lundrigan
- Succeeded by: Mike Mackey

Personal details
- Born: August 23, 1943 Howley, Dominion of Newfoundland
- Died: January 26, 2026 (aged 82)
- Party: Progressive Conservative

Leonard Archibald Simms (October 23, 1943 – January 26, 2026) was a Canadian politician from Newfoundland and Labrador. He was the Progressive Conservative Member of the House of Assembly for Grand Falls from 1979 to 1995. From 2005 until 2014, Simms was chairman and chief executive officer of the Newfoundland and Labrador Housing Corporation, a provincial crown corporation.

Simms served as Speaker of the House of Assembly from 1979 to 1982 when he was appointed to the provincial cabinet of Premier Brian Peckford. Simms served in the portfolios of Culture, Recreation and Youth, Forest Resources and Lands, President of Treasury Board and President of Executive Council.

He ran for the leadership of the Progressive Conservative Party in 1989 but lost to Tom Rideout who subsequently appointed him Development Minister in his Cabinet. The Tory government was defeated in the 1989 general election and Simms moved to the Opposition benches. He succeeded Rideout in 1991 to become Leader of the Opposition and party leader. The party lost the 1993 general election and Simms resigned as party leader two years later.

Simms was appointed head of the Newfoundland and Labrador Housing Corporation by Premier Danny Williams in 2005. In 2007 he stepped down in order to take a senior role in Williams' 2007 re-election campaign and was immediately re-appointed to the $130,000-a-year housing corporation position following the election leading to complaints of "blatant patronage" from the Opposition.

Simms died in January 2026, at the age of 82. He was paid tribute by Premier Tony Wakeham.
