= Pleasantville (electoral district) =

Former provincial electoral district in Newfoundland and Labrador, Canada

Pleasantville was a provincial electoral district for the House of Assembly of Newfoundland and Labrador, Canada. It existed from 1975 to 1996. The district was located in the north end of St. John's.

The riding was created for the 1975 election out of parts of St. John's East Extern and St. John's Centre. It was abolished before the 1996 election, mostly into Virginia Waters and St. John's East, with small parts going to Cape St. Francis and St. John's North.

== Members of the House of Assembly ==
The district has elected the following members of the House of Assembly:

Member	Party	Term
Jerome W. Dinn	Progressive Conservative	1975–1989
Walter Noel	Liberal	1989–1996

== Election results ==
1993 Newfoundland and Labrador general election
Party	Candidate	Votes	%	±%
Liberal	Walter Noel	3,483	46.07	-1.06
Progressive Conservative	Randy Pearcey	3,232	42.75	+0.10
New Democratic	Elaine Price	846	11.19	+0.96
Total valid votes		7,561	99.72	
Total rejected ballots		21	0.28	+0.02
Turnout		7,582	81.25	+6.38
Eligible voters		9,332		
Liberal hold		Swing		-0.58
Source: Elections Newfoundland and Labrador

1989 Newfoundland and Labrador general election
Party	Candidate	Votes	%
Liberal	Walter Noel	3,483	47.12
Progressive Conservative	Stephen Stafford	3,232	42.65
New Democratic	Dennis MacKay	846	10.23
Total valid votes		6,969	99.74
Total rejected ballots		18	0.26
Turnout		6,987	74.87
Eligible voters		9,332	
Source: Elections Newfoundland and Labrador

== See also ==
- List of Newfoundland and Labrador provincial electoral districts
- Canadian provincial electoral districts
