= Jim Morgan (Canadian politician) =

Canadian politician (1939–2019)

MHA for Bonavista South
- In office 1972–1989
- Preceded by: Rossy Barbour
- Succeeded by: Aubrey Gover

Personal details
- Born: James Charles Morgan; October 31, 1939 St. John's, Newfoundland and Labrador
- Died: August 4, 2019 (aged 79) St. John's, Newfoundland and Labrador
- Party: Progressive Conservative Party of Newfoundland and Labrador

James Charles Morgan (October 31, 1939 – August 4, 2019) was a Canadian politician. He represented the electoral district of Bonavista South in the Newfoundland and Labrador House of Assembly from 1972 to 1989. He was a member of the Progressive Conservative Party of Newfoundland and Labrador.

== Early life ==
The son of Samuel Robert and Helen Morgan, he was born at St. John's and was educated at Memorial University, at Devry Technical School in Toronto and at Sir George Williams University in Montreal. In 1967, Morgan married Denise Philippe.

== Political career ==
Morgan was elected to the Newfoundland assembly in 1972. He served in the provincial cabinet as Minister of Transportation and Communications, as Minister of Tourism, as Minister of Forestry and Agriculture and as Minister of Fisheries. He was a candidate for the Progressive Conservative party leadership in 1979 but withdrew, transferring his support to Brian Peckford. In 1988, he made an unsuccessful bid to be the federal Progressive Conservative candidate in the riding of St. John's East but Ross Reid was chosen instead. Morgan made another attempt to enter federal politics in the 2000 election, but was defeated by Liberal Brian Tobin in Bonavista—Trinity—Conception.

== Death ==
Morgan died in St. John's on August 4, 2019, at the age of 79.
