= Rex Gibbons =

Canadian geologist and politician

The Honourable Rex Vincent Gibbons ECNL
- Born: 1946 (age 79–80); Lumsden, Newfoundland
- Education: Memorial University of Newfoundland; Caltech
- Scientific career
- Fields: Geology
- Workplaces: Geological Survey of Newfoundland and Labrador; Lyndon B. Johnson Space Center
- Thesis: Experimental effects of high shock pressure on materials of geological and geophysical interest. (1974)
- Doctoral advisor: Thomas J. Ahrens

Rex Vincent Gibbons (born 1946) is a geologist, educator and former politician in Newfoundland. He represented St. John's West in the Newfoundland House of Assembly from 1989 to 1997.

== Biography ==
He was born in Lumsden and was educated at Memorial University of Newfoundland and the California Institute of Technology, receiving a PhD in Geology. He went on to study Moon rocks and lunar soils at the Lyndon B. Johnson Space Center. In 1976, Gibbons returned to Newfoundland, becoming head of the Publications and Information section of the Newfoundland Department of Mines and Energy, also serving as coordinator of public relations and advertising for the Mines branch of the department. He was an associate editor for Geoscience Canada and served on the board of regents for Memorial University.

He was elected to the Newfoundland assembly in 1989 and was reelected in 1993 and 1996. Gibbons served in the provincial cabinet as Minister of Mines and Energy and as Minister of Natural Resources. He resigned his seat in April 1997 to run for the St. John's West seat in the Canadian House of Commons but came in a close second to Progressive Conservative Charlie Power. He ran in the 2007 provincial election in St. John's South but lost by a wide margin.
