= Dave Gilbert (politician) =

Canadian politician (1935–2019)

Minister of Works, Services, and Transportation
- In office May 5, 1989 – March 14, 1996
- Preceded by: Office Established
- Succeeded by: John Efford

MHA for Burgeo-Bay d'Espoir
- In office 1985–1996
- Preceded by: Harold Andrews

Personal details
- Born: March 31, 1935 Haystack, Dominion of Newfoundland
- Died: July 1, 2019 (aged 84) St. John's, Newfoundland and Labrador
- Party: Liberal Party of Newfoundland and Labrador
- Spouse: Ann Murphy

David S. Gilbert (March 31, 1935 – July 1, 2019) was a politician in Newfoundland and Labrador. He represented Burgeo-Bay d'Espoir in the Newfoundland House of Assembly from 1985 to 1995.

The son of John William Gilbert, he was born in Haystack and was educated at Memorial University. Gilbert took part in the Regular Officer Training Plan of the Royal Canadian Navy. He later worked for the International Acceptance Corporation and also operated a Ford dealership. Gilbert served on the town council for Grand Falls.

He was elected to the Newfoundland assembly in 1985. Gilbert served in the provincial cabinet as Minister of Works, Services and Transportation. He died on July 1, 2019, at the age of 84.
