= Robert Aylward (Canadian politician) =

Canadian politician

The Honourable Robert J. "Bob" Aylward ECNL (born August 13, 1946) is a land surveyor and former politician in Newfoundland. He represented Kilbride in the Newfoundland House of Assembly from 1979 to 1993.

The son of Augustus Aylward and Mary Murphy, he was born in Kilbride and was educated at the Saint Bonaventure's College. Aylward was licensed as a surveyor in 1968 and practised until 1979 when he was elected to the Newfoundland assembly. He was the president of the Association of Newfoundland Land Surveyors. In 1969, he married Jean C. Stead.

Aylward served in the provincial cabinet as the Minister of Rural, Agricultural and Northern Development, as the Minister of Forest Resources and as the Minister of Municipal Affairs and Housing. After leaving politics, he operated a farm. Aylward was a member of the 2006 Electoral Districts Boundaries Commission.
