= Graham Flight =

Canadian politician (1936–2025)

The Honourable Graham Flight ECNL

MHA for Windsor-Buchans
- In office 1975–1982
- In office 1985–1987
- Succeeded by: Clyde Wells
- In office 1989–1996
- Preceded by: Clyde Wells
- Succeeded by: riding dissolved

MHA for Windsor-Springdale
- In office 1996–1999
- Preceded by: new district
- Succeeded by: Ray Hunter

Personal details
- Born: March 22, 1936 Cottle's Island, Dominion of Newfoundland
- Died: March 20, 2025 (aged 88) St. John's, Newfoundland and Labrador, Canada
- Party: Liberal

Graham Ralph Flight (March 22, 1936 – March 20, 2025) was a Canadian politician who represented the districts of Windsor-Buchans and Windsor-Springdale in the Newfoundland and Labrador House of Assembly.

Flight was born at Cottle's Island and was raised in Buchans. He was a teacher and also served as chair of the board of trustees for Buchans.

He was elected to the Newfoundland assembly as a member of the Liberal Party in 1975. Flight was reelected in 1979, defeated in 1982 and was elected again in 1985. He resigned his seat to allow Clyde Wells to run for a seat in the assembly in a 1987 by-election. He was reelected in 1989. Flight served in the provincial cabinet as Minister of Forestry and Agriculture. Flight died in St. John's on March 20, 2025, at the age of 88.
