= Garfield Warren =

Canadian civil servant and politician

Garfield Eric Warren (December 3, 1941 – February 12, 1998) was a civil servant and politician in Newfoundland. He represented Torngat Mountains in the Newfoundland House of Assembly from 1979 to 1993.

The son of Arthur Warren and Jane White, he was born in Chance Cove. He taught school in Port Anne, Manuel's and Arnold's Cove and then worked for the provincial government on the Labrador coast as manager of government stores, as a fisheries representative and on the development of the local crafts industry.

Warren was elected to the Newfoundland assembly in 1979. Originally elected as a Liberal, in 1985 he joined the Conservatives. Warren served in the provincial cabinet as Minister responsible for Northern Development, as Minister of Forestry, Wildlife and Parks and as Minister of Native Affairs. He resigned his seat in 1993. After leaving provincial politics, Warren served on Mount Pearl city council.
