= Jim Kelland =

Canadian politician

The Honourable Jim Kelland ECNL

MHA for Naskaupi
- In office 1985–1992
- Preceded by: Joseph Goudie
- Succeeded by: Edward Roberts

Minister of Environment and Lands
- In office May 5, 1989 – June 3, 1991
- Preceded by: John Butt
- Succeeded by: Pat Cowan

Personal details
- Born: 1933 (age 92–93)

Otto Paul James Kelland (born 1933) is a former politician in Newfoundland. He represented Naskaupi in the Newfoundland House of Assembly from 1985 to 1992.

The son of Otto Kelland, he was born in St. John's and was educated at Bishop Feild College and at St. John's Vocational Institute. Kelland worked in telecommunications as a radio operator and administrator. After amalgamation created the town of Happy Valley-Goose Bay, he became its first mayor in 1974.

Kelland was elected to the Newfoundland assembly in 1985 and was reelected in 1989. He was named to the provincial cabinet as Minister of the Environment and Minister responsible for Wildlife and Parks. He resigned from cabinet in June 1991. Kelland resigned his seat in the assembly on May 28, 1992.
