= John Collins (Canadian politician) =

Canadian politician (1922–2016)

Doctor John Fitzgerald Collins (June 1, 1922 – April 23, 2016) was a Canadian physician and politician in Newfoundland. He represented St. John's South from 1975 to 1989 in the Newfoundland House of Assembly.

He was born in St. John's and was educated at Saint Bonaventure's College, Memorial University, the University of Edinburgh and the University of Toronto. From 1966 to 1969, Collins was head of the cardiology department for the Janeway Children's Health and Rehabilitation Centre. From 1974 to 1979, he was head of the neonatology department of the Grace General Hospital in St. John's. In 1974, Collins became a fellow of the Royal College of Physicians of Edinburgh. He was national chair of the Canadian Medical Association and was president of the Canadian Paediatric Society from 1970 to 1971.

He was elected to the Newfoundland assembly in 1975 and was re-elected in 1979, 1982 and 1985. Collins served as deputy speaker. He also served in the provincial cabinet as Minister of Finance, President of the Treasury Board and Minister of Health. Collins was deputy premier from 1988 to 1989. He did not run for reelection in 1989.

Collins was president of the Rotary Club of St. John's and served on the Child Health Commission from 1965 to 1968.
