= Lynn Verge =

Canadian lawyer and politician

The Honourable Lynn Verge ECNL

Deputy Premier of Newfoundland
- In office March 27, 1989 – May 5, 1989
- Preceded by: John Collins
- Succeeded by: Beaton Tulk

Member of the Newfoundland House of Assembly for Humber East
- In office 1979–1996
- Preceded by: Tom Farrell
- Succeeded by: Bob Mercer

Leader of the Progressive Conservative Party of Newfoundland and Labrador
- In office April 29, 1995 – 1996
- Preceded by: Len Simms
- Succeeded by: Loyola Sullivan

Personal details
- Born: c. 1951
- Party: Progressive Conservative
- Occupation: Lawyer

Lynn Verge (born c. 1951) is a Canadian lawyer and politician from Newfoundland and Labrador. She represented the Corner Brook electoral district of Humber East in the Newfoundland and Labrador House of Assembly from 1979 to 1996. As of 2016, she serves as the executive director of Atwater Library and Computer Centre in Westmount, Quebec.

In 1995, Verge became the first woman to lead a political party in the province when she succeeded Len Simms as leader of the Progressive Conservative Party; she was also the first woman to serve as the Leader of the Official Opposition.

== Politics ==
At the age of 28, she was elected to the House of Assembly in 1979. Following her win Verge, was sworn in as Minister of Education in the cabinet of Brian Peckford, becoming one of the first two female cabinet ministers in Newfoundland and Labrador's history, alongside Consumer Affairs and Environment Minister Hazel Newhook. In 1985, Peckford appointed Verge Minister of Justice and Attorney General. She retained the portfolio when Tom Rideout became premier in March 1989 and was also appointed deputy premier. The following month in the 1989 provincial election, Verge faced off against Liberal leader Clyde Wells in her district of Humber East. Despite Wells leading the Liberal Party to form a majority government, The PC party won the popular vote and Verge defeated Wells in her riding.

Verge sought the leadership of her party in its 1995 leadership race. Her campaign was co-chaired by Kathy Dunderdale, who would later become the province's first female premier. At the convention Verge was elected leader over Loyola Sullivan by a margin of three votes. Her election as leader made Verge the first female leader of a political party in the province. Wells was replaced as Liberal leader and premier by Brian Tobin, a former federal MP and cabinet minister, in 1996. Tobin called a provincial election to be held on February 22, 1996. Tobin was a popular figure in the province and was able to win a large majority government. The Progressive Conservatives had their worst election in 30 years: they won nine of the 48 seats in the legislature and 39% of the popular vote. Verge was defeated in her own district and subsequently resigned as party leader.
