= Tom Rideout =

Canadian lawyer and politician

The Honourable Tom Rideout ECNL

4th Premier of Newfoundland
- In office March 22, 1989 – May 5, 1989
- Monarch: Elizabeth II
- Lieutenant Governor: James A. McGrath
- Deputy: Lynn Verge
- Preceded by: Brian Peckford
- Succeeded by: Clyde Wells

Deputy Premier of Newfoundland and Labrador
- In office November 8, 2005 – May 21, 2008
- Preceded by: Beaton Tulk
- Succeeded by: Kathy Dunderdale

MHA for Baie Verte-Springdale
- In office October 9, 2007 – June 30, 2008
- Preceded by: Paul Shelley
- Succeeded by: Kevin Pollard
- In office September 16, 1975 – October 1, 1991
- Preceded by: New District
- Succeeded by: Harold Small

MHA for Lewisporte
- In office February 9, 1999 – October 9, 2007
- Preceded by: Melvin Penney
- Succeeded by: Wade Verge

Personal details
- Born: Thomas Gerald Rideout; June 25, 1948 (age 78) Fleur de Lys, Newfoundland
- Party: Progressive Conservative (1982-present)
- Other political affiliations: Liberal (1975-1982)

Thomas "Tom" Gerald Rideout (born June 25, 1948) is a former Canadian politician who served as the fourth premier of Newfoundland from March 22, 1989 to May 5, 1989.

== Life and career ==
Born in Fleur de Lys, Newfoundland, Rideout was first elected to the provincial House of Assembly in the 1975 general election as a Liberal but left the party in 1980 to join the Progressive Conservative government of Premier Brian Peckford in its fight with Ottawa for control of offshore petroleum resources.

Rideout became Minister of Culture, Recreation and Youth in 1984 and became Minister of Fisheries in 1985. With Peckford's retirement from politics in 1989, Rideout was chosen Tory party leader and thus became premier of Newfoundland. One month later, at the 1989 provincial election, the Progressive Conservatives narrowly won a higher percentage of votes than the Liberal Party led by Clyde Wells, but the Liberals won the most seats. Wells replaced Rideout as Premier and Rideout remained Leader of the Opposition until October 1991 when he left politics for a federal appointment as a member of the Immigration and Refugee Board of Canada.

Rideout attempted a political comeback in the 1993 federal election, running as the Progressive Conservative candidate in Gander—Grand Falls, but was defeated by Liberal incumbent George Baker.

In 1997, he obtained his law degree from the University of Ottawa, and was called to the Newfoundland bar in 1998.

In 1999, he re-entered public life, and was elected as a Progressive Conservative Member of the House of Assembly for the district of Lewisporte. He was re-elected in 2003, when the PC Party formed the government. He was appointed Minister Responsible for Aboriginal Affairs and Minister of Works, Services & Transportation (the name of which was later changed to Transportation and Works). In addition to these portfolios, Rideout served as acting Minister of Health and Community Services from September 27 to October 1, 2004. On November 8, 2005, Rideout was appointed Minister of Fisheries and Deputy Premier. In the 2007 general election he switched districts and ran in Baie Verte-Springdale, the district he had represented in the House of Assembly from 1975 until 1991.

On May 21, 2008, Rideout tendered his resignation as Deputy Premier, Government House Leader and Minister of Fisheries in the provincial government, in a dispute with the Premier's Office over road funding in his electoral district of Baie Verte-Springdale. On June 30, 2008, Rideout resigned from politics altogether, tendering his resignation as a Member of the House of Assembly.

In 2017, Rideout endorsed Ches Crosbie in the 2018 provincial PC leadership race.
