= Jerome Dinn =

Canadian politician

The Honourable Jerome W. Dinn ECNL (born 1940) is a former politician in Newfoundland and Labrador. He represented Pleasantville in the Newfoundland House of Assembly from 1975 to 1989.

Dinn was born in St. John's, Newfoundland and Labrador and was educated at St. Patrick's Hall there and at the Radio and Telecommunications School in Clinton, Ontario. From 1958 to 1968, he served in the Royal Canadian Air Force. He then worked for NASA, for IBM Canada and the Newfoundland Telephone Company.

Dinn served as vice-president and president of the St. John's East Extern Progressive Conservative Association. He was elected to the Newfoundland assembly in 1975 and was reelected in 1979, 1982 and 1985. Dinn served as party whip and was a member of the Newfoundland cabinet, serving as Minister of Municipal Affairs and Housing, as Minister of Transportation and Communications and as Minister of Labour and Manpower.
