= Ron Dawe =

Canadian politician

The Honourable Ronald Gilbert Dawe ECNL (born 1944) is a Canadian educator and former politician in Newfoundland. He represented St. George's in the Newfoundland House of Assembly from 1979 to 1989.

He was born in Topsail and was educated at Prince of Wales Collegiate and Memorial University. After completing his education, Dawe taught high school. He was also Parks and Recreation director for Stephenville and a recreation consultant for the Newfoundland Department of Rehabilitation and Recreation.

He was elected to the Newfoundland assembly in 1979. Dawe served in the provincial cabinet as Minister of Tourism, Recreation and Culture, as Minister of the Environment and as Minister of Transportation. After he left politics in 1989, he was involved in several businesses, including an inn in Buchans. Dawe served as a senior policy advisor for the Liberal government. He resigned that position in 2002 to seek the Progressive Conservative nomination for St. George's-Stephenville East. However, PC leader Danny Williams refused to allow Dawe to run for the nomination. He subsequently became the Liberal candidate but lost to Joan Burke in the 2003 general election.
