= Hubert Kitchen =

Canadian politician (1928–2020)

Member of the Newfoundland and Labrador House of Assembly
- Constituency: Harbour Grace (1971–72); St. John's West (1977–79); St. John's East (1989–96)

Personal details
- Born: September 16, 1928 Buchans, Newfoundland
- Died: July 18, 2020 (aged 91) St. John's, Newfoundland and Labrador, Canada
- Party: Liberal Party of Newfoundland and Labrador
- Spouse: Jennifer Rooney (m. 1957)
- Occupation: educator, academic, auditor

Hubert William Kitchen (September 16, 1928 – July 18, 2020) was a Canadian politician. He served in the Newfoundland and Labrador House of Assembly as a member of the Liberal Party of Newfoundland and Labrador. He also served in cabinet as Minister of Finance and Minister of Health. Born in Buchans, Newfoundland and Labrador, he attended McGill University, Memorial University, and the University of Alberta, earning B.Comm, B.Ed, M.Ed. and Ph.D. degrees. He was an auditor, school principal, professor of educational administration. He married Jennifer Rooney in 1957 and had a son and a daughter Kitchen died on July 18, 2020, in St. John's.
