= Walter C. Carter =

Canadian politician

Walter Carter

Member of Parliament for St. John's West
- In office 9 September 1968 – 3 September 1975
- Preceded by: Richard Cashin

Minister of Fisheries
- In office October 10, 1975 – January 26, 1980
- Preceded by: John Crosbie
- Succeeded by: Jim Morgan

Personal details
- Born: Walter Carmichael Carter; 8 April 1929 Greenspond, Dominion of Newfoundland
- Died: 20 January 2002 (aged 72)

Walter Carmichael Carter (8 March 1929 – 20 January 2002) was a Canadian politician.

Born in Greenspond, Newfoundland, he was educated there and at Memorial University of Newfoundland. He was elected to St. John's City Council in 1961. Carter was elected to the Newfoundland and Labrador House of Assembly in 1962 and was deputy mayor of St. John's from 1966 to 1968. He was first elected to the Canadian House of Commons for the riding of St. John's West in the 1968 federal election. A Progressive Conservative, he was re-elected in 1972 and 1974. After resigning from the House of Commons to seek provincial office, he tried to return to federal politics but was defeated in 1979 (as a Progressive Conservative) and 1984 (as a Liberal). He was again elected to the Newfoundland and Labrador House of Assembly and was Minister of Fisheries in the cabinets of Frank Moores, Brian Peckford and Clyde Wells. He retired in 1996.

His memoir, Never a Dull Moment (Creative Publishers, ISBN 1-894294-00-9), was published in 1998.
