= Brian Peckford =

Canadian politician

The Honourable Brian Peckford PC
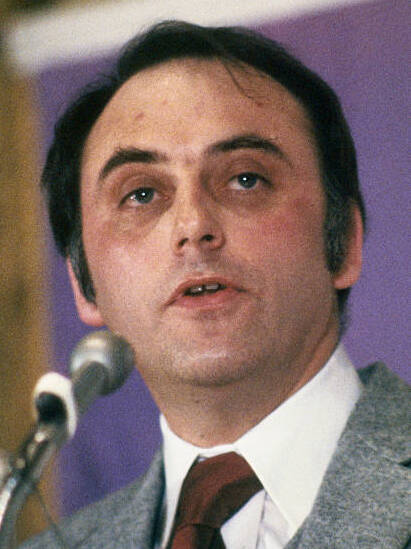
- Peckford in 1980

3rd Premier of Newfoundland
- In office March 26, 1979 – March 22, 1989
- Monarch: Elizabeth II
- Lieutenant Governor: Gordon A. Winter; Tony Paddon; James A. McGrath
- Preceded by: Frank Moores
- Succeeded by: Thomas Rideout

Member of the Newfoundland House of Assembly for Green Bay
- In office March 24, 1972 – April 20, 1989
- Preceded by: Harold Starkes
- Succeeded by: Alvin Hewlett

Newfoundland Minister of Mines and Energy
- In office September 9, 1976 – March 26, 1979
- Preceded by: John Crosbie
- Succeeded by: William Doody

Newfoundland Minister of Municipal Affairs and Housing
- In office October 1, 1974 – September 9, 1976
- Preceded by: H. R. Val Earle
- Succeeded by: Jerome Dinn

Personal details
- Born: August 27, 1942 (age 83) Whitbourne, Dominion of Newfoundland
- Party: Progressive Conservative
- Spouse: Carol Peckford
- Occupation: Teacher

Alfred Brian Peckford PC (born August 27, 1942) is a Canadian politician who served as the third premier of Newfoundland from March 26, 1979 to March 22, 1989. A member of the Progressive Conservative Party, Peckford was first elected as the Member of the House of Assembly (MHA) for Green Bay following the 1972 general election. He served as a cabinet minister in Frank Moores' government before he was elected as PC leader in 1979 following Moores' retirement.

== Background ==
Alfred Brian Peckford was born in Whitbourne, Newfoundland on August 27, 1942, and was raised in the communities of Whitbourne, Marystown, and Lewisporte. He earned a Bachelor of Education degree from Memorial University of Newfoundland, and has completed postgraduate work in English Literature, Education, Psychology, and French Literature. Prior to entering politics, he was a high school teacher in rural Newfoundland. He was the founding patron of the Wessex Society of Newfoundland and Labrador.

== Politics ==
Peckford was the Progressive Conservative (PC) candidate in the district of Green Bay in the 1972 provincial election. The PC Party won a majority government in the election and Peckford was narrowly elected in his district over the Liberal candidate. In 1973 he was appointed Parliamentary Assistant to Premier Frank Moores and the following year he was sworn into cabinet as the Minister of Municipal Affairs and Housing. In the 1975 general election Peckford won 70 percent of the popular vote in his district, defeating the Liberal and New Democratic Party candidates. The PC Party won its second majority government under the leadership of Moores and Peckford remained the Minister of Municipal Affairs and Housing. The following year Moores shuffled his cabinet and Peckford was appointed Minister of Mines and Energy; and Rural and Northern Development.

=== Minister of Mines and Energy ===
Peckford was appointed Minister of Mines and Energy on September 9, 1976, replacing John Crosbie who was leaving provincial politics to run federally. The offshore oil industry was seen as a bright spot in the economic outlook for the province. As the minister responsible Peckford fought hard for provincial control over the emerging industry. Oil companies suspended offshore drilling in 1977 in protest, but after some compromises were made the oil companies eventually accepted the Newfoundland terms, which aimed to maximize local economic benefits and minimize social and environmental disruption. Oil companies would start drilling once again in 1978 under the province's term. One of the terms arranged was that oil companies would be responsible for paying the cost of training local people to work in the industry. The companies had the choice of spending the money themselves on training and researching or paying it into the provincial treasury. Peckford said he pushed for these terms with oil companies after seeing resource give aways in the mining sector as well as the Upper Churchill Falls hydroelectric deal. While Peckford was able to negotiate an agreement with oil companies over drilling in the continental shelf, the province was engaged in ownership dispute with the federal Liberal government over offshore petroleum resources. This dispute was settled after Peckford became premier.

=== Premier ===
On January 19, 1979, Moores announced he was stepping down as premier of the province and leaving politics. Even before announcing his leadership bid Peckford was mentioned as a likely frontrunner to succeed Moores. Ten people ran for the leadership of the party at its March 17, 1979, convention. Out of those ten, Peckford, Leo Barry, Walter Carter and William Doody were seen as the likelier candidates. Peckford was still considered by some media as the frontrunner and had racked up the most cabinet and caucus support. At the convention he led on the first two ballots and was elected leader over Carter and Doody on the third and final ballot.

At 36 years of age Peckford became the youngest first minister in Newfoundland's history and one of the few members of the political elite from a working-class outport background. Liberal leader Bill Rowe challenged Peckford to call an election immediately. He instead waited several months, first bringing down a budget, introducing new legislation and overhauling the rules of legislative procedure. On May 25, 1979, the legislature was dissolved with an election called for June 18. The election was called after Rowe had announced a Liberal leadership convention for July 6–7, due to party dissension over his leadership. While Rowe had planned on contesting the leadership himself he stepped aside and the Liberals installed Liberal MP Don Jamieson as leader two days after the election was called. Prior to Moores' resignation an opinion poll showed the Liberals leading the Progressive Conservatives; no formal polls were conducted during the election campaign. On election day Peckford led his party to its third straight majority government, they won 50 percent of the popular vote and 33 of the 52 seats in the House of Assembly. The Liberals won 41 percent of the vote and 19 seats, the NL NDP won 8 percent of the vote but no seats.

Resource management dominated Peckford's ten years as Premier of Newfoundland, particularly offshore oil, the fisheries, and hydroelectric developments. In all three areas, Peckford hoped to wrestle control from outside interests to secure greater revenues for the province. He argued this would end Newfoundland's status as the poorest province in the country. His government tried to renegotiate the Upper Churchill contract with Hydro Quebec, which had been signed by Premier Joey Smallwood in 1969. The deal sold cheap power to Hydro Quebec for 65 years with no allowances for inflation or revision. The province launched two legal battles over the deal but the Supreme Court of Canada ruled twice in Quebec's favour, in 1984 and 1988. The Peckford government sought to develop power on the Lower Churchill River, but could not secure a transmission route through Quebec into lucrative American and Canadian markets.

Although the fisheries remained vital to the economy of rural Newfoundland, they fell under federal jurisdiction. Ottawa determined fish quotas, distributed trawler licenses, and set all other aspects of fisheries policy. During the 1980 constitutional negotiations Peckford tried to acquire greater provincial control of the fisheries, but was unable to get enough support from other premiers. Peckford argued the province had a historic and moral right to the fisheries and the government did its best to influence federal fisheries policy. When the federal Department of Fisheries and Oceans issued licenses to three factory freezer trawlers in 1985, he declared it "a disaster of monumental proportions". Overfishing continued to be an issue, and decisions made by Peckford's own administration did not help matters. Just three years after he left office cod stocks collapsed and the federal government announced a cod moratorium, which is still in effect in 2012.

After securing deals with oil companies regarding offshore exploration, he battled with Ottawa over ownership of the oil. The Peckford government had tried to negotiate an agreement with Pierre Trudeau's Liberal government over ownership, but were unsuccessful. With the two governments unable to come to an agreement the dispute was sent to the Supreme Court of Canada in 1982. The Peckford and Trudeau governments were that far apart on their views that Peckford hinted that Newfoundlanders and Labradorians might take a more radical stance, similar to the Quebec separatists, if the courts ruled against them.

During his heated dispute with the federal government Peckford called an election for April 6, 1982, hoping to regain a mandate to continue his tough stance with Ottawa and renegotiate the Upper Churchill contract with Quebec. The Liberals, led by Len Stirling, disagreed with Peckford's aggressive stances and campaigned on a slogan of "Make Work Not War". On election night Peckford led his party to victory again, winning 61 percent of the vote and 44 of the 52 seats in the House of Assembly. Only eight Liberals were elected and Stirling was defeated in his own riding of Bonavista North. During his election victory speech Peckford stated that "I am more convinced than I have any time in the past that Newfoundlanders and Labradorians speak [with] one voice when we all say one day the sun will shine and have-not will be no more", words that went on to become a household phrase in the province.

In March 1984 the Supreme Court ruled that the federal government owned the right to develop minerals on the continental shelf off Canada's coast. Peckford shifted his efforts to gaining joint management and most of the revenues from offshore oil resources and embarked on a cross-Canada tour to drum up support for the province's position. In the September 4, 1984, federal election Brian Mulroney's Progressive Conservative Party won a large majority government. Prior to the election Mulroney had agreed to a fair deal for the province with regards to offshore energy resources. On February 11, 1985, less than six months since Mulroney's election victory, both levels of government signed the Atlantic Accord. The Accord granted Newfoundland significant decision-making powers and financial benefits. It made the federal and provincial governments equal partners in the management of offshore developments through the Canada-Newfoundland Offshore Petroleum Board. The Accord was widely hailed as a success for the Peckford government and a turning point for the provincial economy.

Weeks after signing the Atlantic Accord, Peckford announced that an election would be held on April 2, 1985. He self-proclaimed himself the "Great Negotiator" for the Atlantic Accord but during the election he was hounded by teachers and public service employees who were upset with the two year government-imposed wage freeze. Fraser March, the president of the Newfoundland Public Employees Association, had pledged to campaign against "every Tory in the province". A poll released just days before the vote showed the Progressive Conservatives and Liberals were tied at 41.5 percent outside St. John's, while Peckford's Tories led in the capital city. The Progressive Conservatives won 49 per cent of the popular vote on election night, compared to 37 percent for the Liberals and 14 percent for the NDP.

Although resource development dominated Peckford's time as premier his government is responsible for a number of things that have shaped Newfoundland and Labrador. After his party was re-elected in 1979 Peckford appointed Lynn Verge and Hazel Newhook to cabinet, they became the first women to serve as Cabinet ministers in the province. Peckford also brought in the first pay equity policy, established the first Status of Women Council, and in 1983 appointed Margaret Cameron as the province's first woman Supreme Court justice. In 1980 the new provincial flag, his government is responsible for the Department of Environment, they brought in grade 12 to the high school curriculum, and started construction on the Trans-Labrador Highway. In 1987 the Peckford government partnered with Phillip Sprung to construct a hydroponic greenhouse complex on the St. John's-Mount Pearl border. While the greenhouses were supposed to create jobs, tap into a profitable export market, and supply local consumers with fresh and affordable vegetables year-round, they ended up being an economic disaster. The government poured $22 million into the project and it went bankrupt only two years later. The credibility of Peckford and the Progressive Conservatives had been hurt by the project. On January 21, 1989, he announced he was leaving politics, Tom Rideout was chosen as his successor in March, and the PC Party was defeated in the provincial election the following month by the Liberals.

== Post-political life ==
Peckford became a business consultant and has sat on numerous boards since leaving politics including the board of the Canadian Broadcasting Corporation in the 1990s. He relocated to British Columbia in the early 1990s and in 1998 was appointed to lead a one-person inquiry into the state of Fraser River salmon stocks and fishery management.

In 2008, he was appointed chair of a federal government–appointed expert panel to review federal chronic disease policy, especially diabetes, and to present a report to the federal Health minister. He is currently a director of Strongbow Exploration Inc., a public junior mining company. He has also been an advisor to the British Columbia Conservative Party, co-chairing the party's issues management committee.

Peckford endorsed the People's Party led by Maxime Bernier in the 2021 Canadian federal election and Peckford appeared on Jordan Peterson's podcast on January 26, 2022, where he claimed that the Canadian government infringed on the Canadian Charter of Rights and Freedoms during the COVID-19 pandemic.

On January 27, 2022, it was revealed that Peckford is the lead plaintiff for the Justice Centre for Constitutional Freedoms in a federal court case which is challenging the validity of the federal government’s ban on travel for people who are unvaccinated.

Peckford and his wife currently live in Qualicum Beach, Vancouver Island.

== Electoral record ==
1985 Newfoundland general election
Party	Candidate	Votes	%	±%
Progressive Conservative	Brian Peckford	3,373	68.56	-9.80
Liberal	Renold E. Clarke	1,254	25.49	+3.84
New Democratic	Mervyn W. Poole	293	5.96	
Total valid votes		4,920	99.76	
Total rejected ballots		12	0.24	+0.06
Turnout		4,932	70.36	-0.20
Eligible voters		7,010		
Progressive Conservative hold		Swing		-6.82

1982 Newfoundland general election
Party	Candidate	Votes	%	±%
Progressive Conservative	Brian Peckford	3,338	78.36	+1.32
Liberal	Munden Derek Batstone	922	21.64	-0.07
Total valid votes		4,260	99.81	
Total rejected ballots		8	0.19	-0.01
Turnout		4,268	70.56	-4.74
Eligible voters		6,049		
Progressive Conservative hold		Swing		+0.70

1979 Newfoundland general election
Party	Candidate	Votes	%	±%
Progressive Conservative	Brian Peckford	3,502	77.03	+6.70
Liberal	Maurice Budgell	987	21.71	-5.69
New Democratic	Brian M. Walsh	57	1.25	-1.01
Total valid votes		4,546	99.80	
Total rejected ballots		9	0.20	-0.04
Turnout		4,555	75.30	+8.70
Eligible voters		6,049		
Progressive Conservative hold		Swing		+6.19

1975 Newfoundland general election
Party	Candidate	Votes	%	±%
Progressive Conservative	Brian Peckford	2,639	70.34	+18.98
Liberal	H. Corbin Clarke	1,028	27.40	-21.25
New Democratic	Harold J. Card	85	2.27	
Total valid votes		3,752	99.76	
Total rejected ballots		9	0.24	-0.08
Turnout		3,761	66.60	-18.02
Eligible voters		5,647		
Progressive Conservative hold		Swing		+20.11

1972 Newfoundland general election
Party	Candidate	Votes	%	±%
Progressive Conservative	Brian Peckford	2,560	51.35	+12.85
Liberal	Harold Starkes	2,425	48.65	-7.73
Total valid votes		4,985	99.68	
Total rejected ballots		16	0.32	-0.39
Turnout		5,001	84.62	+10.29
Eligible voters		5,910		
Progressive Conservative gain from Liberal		Swing		+10.29
