= Neil Windsor =

Canadian politician (1945–2021)

H. Neil Windsor

Member of the Newfoundland House of Assembly for Mount Pearl
- In office September 16, 1975 – February 22, 1996
- Preceded by: John Carter (as MHA for St. John's North)
- Succeeded by: Julie Bettney

Personal details
- Born: Hunter Neil Windsor; July 8, 1945 St. John's, Newfoundland
- Died: March 28, 2021 (aged 75) Gander, Newfoundland and Labrador
- Party: Progressive Conservative
- Occupation: Engineer

Hunter Neil Windsor (July 8, 1945 – March 28, 2021) was a Canadian engineer and politician. He represented the electoral district of Mount Pearl in the Newfoundland and Labrador House of Assembly from 1975 to 1995. He was a member of the Progressive Conservative Party of Newfoundland and Labrador.

Prior to entering politics, Windsor worked as town engineer for the then Town of Mt. Pearl. He worked with then mayor Kel Ashford to obtain a swimming pool for the community, and was also one of five people who worked together to establish the Mt. Pearl Minor Hockey Association. In 2005, he was inducted into the Mt. Pearl Sports Hall of Fame.

Windsor is credited with being a driving force behind Mt. Pearl achieving city status.

From 1996 to 2011, Windsor served as executive director and registrar for the Association of Professional Engineers, Geologists and Geoscientists of Alberta and received numerous awards for his work.

In November 2014, Mt. Pearl's municipal building was re-named the H. Neil Windsor Municipal Building.

Windsor died in 2021.
