= Charlie Brett =

Canadian politician (born 1936)

The Honourable Charlie Brett ECNL

MHA for Trinity North
- In office 1972–1989
- Preceded by: Uriah Strickland
- Succeeded by: Barry Hynes

Personal details
- Born: August 18, 1936 (age 90) Barr'd Island, Dominion of Newfoundland
- Party: Progressive Conservative Party of Newfoundland and Labrador
- Occupation: Business administrator

Roy Charles Brett (born August 18, 1936) was a Canadian politician. He represented the electoral district of Trinity North in the Newfoundland and Labrador House of Assembly from 1972 to 1989. He was a member of the Progressive Conservative Party of Newfoundland and Labrador.

The son of William Robert Brett and Phoebe Elizabeth Keats, he was born in Barr'd Island, Newfoundland and was educated there and at Memorial University. Brett was a business administrator. In 1956, he married Norma Rice.

Brett was elected to the Newfoundland assembly in 1972. He served in the provincial cabinet as Minister of Social Services, as Minister of Consumer Affairs and Environment and as Minister of Transport and Communications. He resigned his seat soon after being reelected in 1989.
