= 2023 Progressive Conservative Party of Newfoundland and Labrador leadership election =

Leadership election for the Newfoundland and Labrador Progressive Conservative Party

- October 13–15, 2023
- Opinion polls
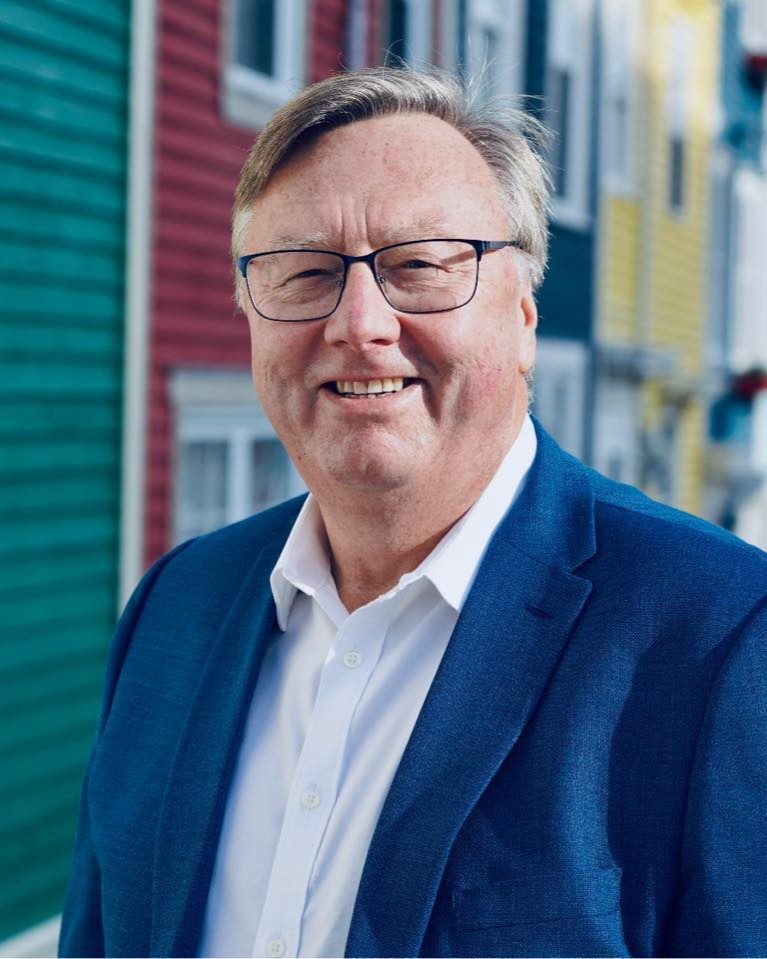

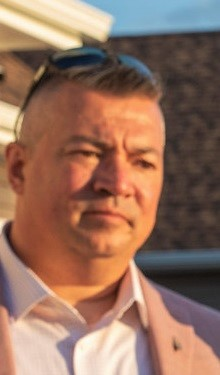
		EM
Candidate	Tony Wakeham	Eugene Manning	Lloyd Parrott
Final ballot	2,091 pts (52.28%)	1,909 pts (47.73%)	Eliminated
First ballot	1,816 pts (45.40%)	1,636 pts (40.90%)	548 pts (13.70%)
Leader before election
David Brazil (interim)
Elected Leader
Tony Wakeham

2023 Progressive Conservative Party of Newfoundland and Labrador leadership election
- Date: October 13–15, 2023
- Convention: Sheraton Hotel; St. John's, NL
- Resigning leader: Ches Crosbie
- Won by: Tony Wakeham
- Ballots: 2
- Candidates: 3
- Entrance fee: $20,000
- Spending limit: $225,000

The 2023 Progressive Conservative Party of Newfoundland and Labrador leadership election was held between October 13–15, 2023 to select a successor to Ches Crosbie, who stepped down following his defeat in the 2021 Newfoundland and Labrador general election. Candidate nominations opened May 17, 2023, and closed June 16, 2023. On October 14, 2023, MHA Tony Wakeham was narrowly elected leader on the second ballot.

== Timeline ==
- March 27, 2021 – The preliminary results of the provincial election are announced, where Premier Andrew Furey is re-elected with a slim majority. Ches Crosbie, the party's leader, loses his seat in Windsor Lake to Liberal candidate John Hogan.
- March 31, 2021 – After taking a few days to speak with the party caucus and his family, Crosbie announces his resignation as party leader. David Brazil is appointed as the interim leader, who believed it would take "a year or two" before a leadership convention would be held.
- April 5, 2021 – Party president Eugene Manning resigns, citing that he would have to be impartial in a future leadership election. He is succeeded by vice president Matthew Janes as interim president.
- August 19, 2021 – The party releases the rules for the leadership campaign without setting a formal date.
- August 19, 2021 – Former mayor of Howley and disqualified 2014 leadership candidate Wayne Ronald Bennett declares his candidacy.
- June 24, 2022 – Leadership Committee co-chairs Shawn Skinner and Rhonda McMeekin announced that the party will hold its leadership convention on October 13–15, 2023 at the Sheraton Hotel in St. John’s. Candidate nominations will open May 17, 2023, and close June 16, 2023. The new leader will be announced on October 14, 2023.
- July 4, 2022 – MHA Lloyd Parrott announces his candidacy.
- January 16, 2023 – Interim leader David Brazil announces he will not be a candidate for the permanent leadership.
- January 17, 2023 – MHA Tony Wakeham announces his candidacy.
- February 21, 2023 – Businessman and former PC Party president Eugene Manning announces his candidacy.
- May 17, 2023 – Eugene Manning announces he has been approved by the party as an accredited candidate.
- May 19, 2023 – Tony Wakeham announces he has been approved by the party as an accredited candidate.
- June 16, 2023 – The Party Executive announces that Eugene Manning, Lloyd Parrott, and Tony Wakeham have been approved as accredited candidates.
- September 24, 2023 – Televised Debate hosted by NTV News. Eugene Manning, Lloyd Parrott, and Tony Wakeham participated.
- October 14, 2023 - MHA Tony Wakeham was elected leader on the second ballot.

== Candidates approved by the party as accredited candidates ==
=== Eugene Manning ===
Businessman and former NL PC Party president (2019-2021)

Date campaign launched: February 21, 2023

Candidate Accreditation: May 17, 2023

Campaign Website: www.eugenemanning.ca

Supporters
MHAs: Helen Conway-Ottenheimer, MHA for Harbour Main; Paul Dinn, MHA for Topsail-Paradise
Prominent Supporters: Sue Collins, 2019 and 2021 candidate for Fogo Island-Cape Freels; Devin Drover, former Crosbie staffer and 2022 Poilievre campaign chair for NL; Kristina Ennis, 2021 candidate for St. John's West; Janet Fryday Dorey, Former Executive Director of the Conservative Party of Canada; Judy Manning, NL Minister of Justice (2014-2015); Fabian Manning, NL Senator; John Ottenheimer, MHA for St. John's East (1996-2007); Gillian Pearson, 2019 candidate for Mount Pearl-Southlands; Charlene Walsh, 2019 and 2021 candidate for Fortune Bay-Cape La Hune; Deanne Stapleton, Former St. John's City Councillor.

=== Lloyd Parrott ===
MHA for Terra Nova (2019–present), Clarenville town councillor (2017–2019).

Date campaign launched: July 4, 2022; Official launch: April 18, 2023

Candidate Accreditation: June 16, 2023

Supporters
MHAs: Chris Tibbs, MHA for Grand Falls-Windsor-Buchans, Jeff Dwyer, MHA for Placentia West-Bellevue

=== Tony Wakeham ===
MHA for Stephenville-Port au Port (2019–present). Wakeham was a 2018 PC leadership candidate. He is the former CEO of Labrador-Grenfell Health. He also worked in senior health management roles in St. John's, Clarenville and Grand Falls-Windsor. Wakeham grew up in Placentia and studied economics at Memorial University. Wakeham, lives in Kippens, and also has deep roots in the sport of basketball, both as a player and coach at the provincial and federal levels. Wakeham previously served as President of the NLBA and Canada Basketball. He and his wife Patricia have two adult children.

Date campaign launched: January 17, 2023

Candidate Accreditation: May 19, 2023

Campaign Website: www.tonywakeham.ca

Supporters
Former Party Leaders: Len Simms, PC Leader (1991-1995); Tom Marshall, 11th Premier of Newfoundland and Labrador (2014).
MHAs: Pleaman Forsey, MHA for Exploits; Loyola O'Driscoll, MHA for Ferryland; Craig Pardy, MHA for Bonavista; Barry Petten, MHA for Conception Bay South; Joedy Wall, MHA for Cape St. Francis.
Former MHAs: Jim Baker, MHA for Labrador West (2007-2011); Clyde Jackman, MHA for Burin-Placentia West (2003-2015); Glenn Tobin, MHA for Burin-Placentia West (1982-1996); Loyola Sullivan, MHA for Ferryland (1992-2006); Kevin Parsons, MHA for Cape St. Francis (2008-2021); Wallace "Wally" Young, MHA for St. Barbe (2001-2011).
Former MPs: Bill Matthews, MP for Random—Burin—St. George's (1997-2008).
Prominent Supporters: Leo Bonnell, Former Chairperson Provincial Advisory Council on Aging and Seniors; Hal Cormier, Pasadena Municipal Councillor; Damian Follett, musician, 2021 candidate for Mount Scio; Tony Oliver, former vice-president of the provincial party; Katarina Roxon, Canadian Paralympic Swimmer; Nathan Ryan, PC Youth President (2020-2022), Ferryland Municipal Councillor; Paul Thomey, former President of the St. John's Board of Trade; Shannon Tobin, 2019 and 2021 candidate for Lake Melville; Tina Neary, Municipal Councillor of Portugal Cove-St. Philips.

== Opinion polling ==
Leader preference among PC supporters

Polling Firm	Date of Polling	Link	Tony Wakeham	Eugene Manning	Lloyd Parrott	Don't Know
Abacus Data	September 19–25, 2023		29%	16%	7%	48%

== Failed to qualify ==
=== Wayne Ronald Bennett ===
Former Mayor of Howley, former leader of the Newfoundland and Labrador First Party (2008–2011), perennial candidate

Date campaign launched: October 3, 2021

Failed to qualify: June 16, 2023

== Declined to run ==
- David Brazil, Interim leader of the Progressive Conservative Party (2021–2023), MHA for Conception Bay East–Bell Island (2010–2023)
- Danny Breen, Mayor of St. John's (2017–present), former St. John's city councillor (2009–2017)
- Barry Petten, MHA for Conception Bay South (2015–present) Endorsed Wakeham
- Shawn Skinner, former St. John's city councillor (1993–1997; 2020–2021), MHA for St. John's Centre (2003–2011)

== Results ==
(Voting Held October 4–14, 2023)

= Eliminated from next round
= Winner

Point allocation by ballot
Candidate	Ballot 1	Ballot 2
Name	Votes	Votes
Tony Wakeham	1,816; 45.4%	2,091; 52.0%
Eugene Manning	1,636; 40.9%	1,909; 48.0%
Lloyd Parrott	548; 13.7%	Eliminated
Total Points	4,000.00	4,000.00
