= Leo Barry (jurist) =

Canadian politician and judge (1943–2026)

The Honourable Leo Barry ECNL

Justice of the Court of Appeal of Newfoundland and Labrador
- In office April 2, 2007 – August 7, 2018
- Nominated by: Stephen Harper
- Appointed by: Rob Nicholson

Justice of the Supreme Court of Newfoundland and Labrador
- In office June 30, 1989 – April 2, 2007
- Nominated by: Brian Mulroney
- Appointed by: Doug Lewis

Leader of the Opposition (Newfoundland and Labrador)
- In office October 13, 1984 – March 23, 1987
- Preceded by: Steve Neary
- Succeeded by: Roger Simmons

Leader of the Liberal Party of Newfoundland and Labrador
- In office October 13, 1984 – April 28, 1987
- Preceded by: Len Stirling
- Succeeded by: Roger Simmons (interim)
Ministerial and other legislative offices
Minister of Mines and Energy
In office July 3, 1979 – January 24, 1983
Premier	Brian Peckford
Preceded by	C. William Doody
Succeeded by	Ron Dawe
In office April 3, 1973 – November 3, 1975
Premier	Frank Moores
Preceded by	Edward Maynard (as Minister of Mines, Agriculture, and Resources)
Succeeded by	John Crosbie
Minister of Industrial Development
In office July 3, 1979 – August 18, 1980
Premier	Brian Peckford
Preceded by	Edward Maynard
Succeeded by	Neil Windsor
Minister without portfolio
In office January 1, 1973 – April 2, 1973
Premier	Frank Moores
Member of the Newfoundland House of Assembly for Mount Scio
In office June 18, 1979 – April 20, 1989
Preceded by	Ray Winsor
Succeeded by	Jim Walsh
Member of the Newfoundland House of Assembly for Burin-Placentia West
In office March 24, 1972 – September 16, 1975
Preceded by	Patrick Canning
Succeeded by	Patrick Canning

Personal details
- Born: Leo Denis Barry; August 7, 1943 Red Island, Newfoundland
- Died: October 24, 2026 (aged 83) St. John's, Newfoundland and Labrador, Canada
- Party: Liberal (1984–1989); Progressive Conservative (1972–1984)
- Education: Memorial University of Newfoundland (B.Sc, B.A.); Dalhousie Law School; Yale Law School (LL.M.)

Leo Denis Barry (August 7, 1943 – October 24, 2026) was a Canadian jurist and politician. He was the provincial Leader of the Opposition from 1984 to 1987 as the leader of the Liberal Party. Following his retirement from politics, Barry was appointed a Justice of the Supreme Court of Newfoundland, where he served from 1989 to 2007. He then served as a Justice in the provincial Court of Appeal from 2007 to 2018.

== Early life and education ==
Born in Red Island, Newfoundland and Labrador, Barry graduated from Memorial University (BA 1963, BSc 1962), Dalhousie Law School in 1967 and received a Masters (specialization in Jurisprudence and International Law) from Yale Law School in 1968.

== Political career ==
Prior to his judicial career, Barry was a Newfoundland MHA and Liberal Party of Newfoundland and Labrador leader and Leader of the Opposition from 1984 until 1987 when he was forced to resign as party leader due to opposition by his caucus.

Barry was initially elected to the Newfoundland and Labrador House of Assembly as a Progressive Conservative in 1972. He served as Deputy Speaker of the House of Assembly before being appointed to the Cabinet of Frank Moores as Minister of Mines and Energy during which time he took a leading role in developing Newfoundland's oil and gas regulations. He was defeated in the 1975 provincial election and served as chairman of the Newfoundland Labor Relations Board for until 1977 when he became a lecturer at Dalhousie University's law school in Halifax.

In 1979, Barry returned to Newfoundland and contested the leadership of the Progressive Conservative party placing third, losing to Brian Peckford. He won a seat during the 1979 provincial election and was appointed energy minister in Peckford's cabinet. Barry resigned from cabinet in 1981 due to a disagreement with Peckford over negotiations with the federal government over Newfoundland's claim to offshore resources. On February 21, 1984, he crossed the floor to join the Liberal Party and became the party's leader later on October 14. As Liberal leader in the 1985 provincial election he increased the number of Liberal seats from four to 15 in the 52 member House of Assembly.

Despite his initial success in increasing the Liberal Party's position, he was seen as aloof and arrogant and was not popular with his caucus who saw him as unwilling to put all of his energy into the party. His position became less secure after the Liberals came in third place in two by-elections.

In February 1987, after Barry went on a week-long trip to Boston without informing his caucus, he returned to be handed a letter signed by all 14 of his caucus colleagues demanding a leadership convention. He initially refused to resign as party leader but agreed to allow a leadership convention in which he would be a candidate. He resigned as Leader of the Opposition on March 23, 1987 and then withdrew from the leadership race and resigned as party leader on April 28, 1987. Clyde Wells was elected party leader in June and went on to lead the Liberal Party to victory in the 1989 provincial election.

== Judicial career ==
Barry returned to his legal practice and was appointed to the bench on June 30, 1989 becoming a judge of the Trial Division of the Supreme Court of Newfoundland and Labrador. On April 2, 2007, he was appointed a judge of the Court of Appeal of the Supreme Court of Newfoundland and Labrador. He reached mandatory retirement on August 7, 2018.

He was a rumoured candidate to replace Supreme Court of Canada Justice Michel Bastarache. However, Prime Minister Stephen Harper nominated Thomas Cromwell of Nova Scotia to fill the vacancy.

== Death ==
Barry died in St. John's on October 24, 2026, at the age of 83. Premier Tony Wakeham and Liberal leader John Hogan wrote tributes following his death.
