= Leader of the Opposition (Newfoundland and Labrador) =

Parliamentary position of the House of Assembly in Newfoundland and Labrador, Canada

Leader of the Official Opposition
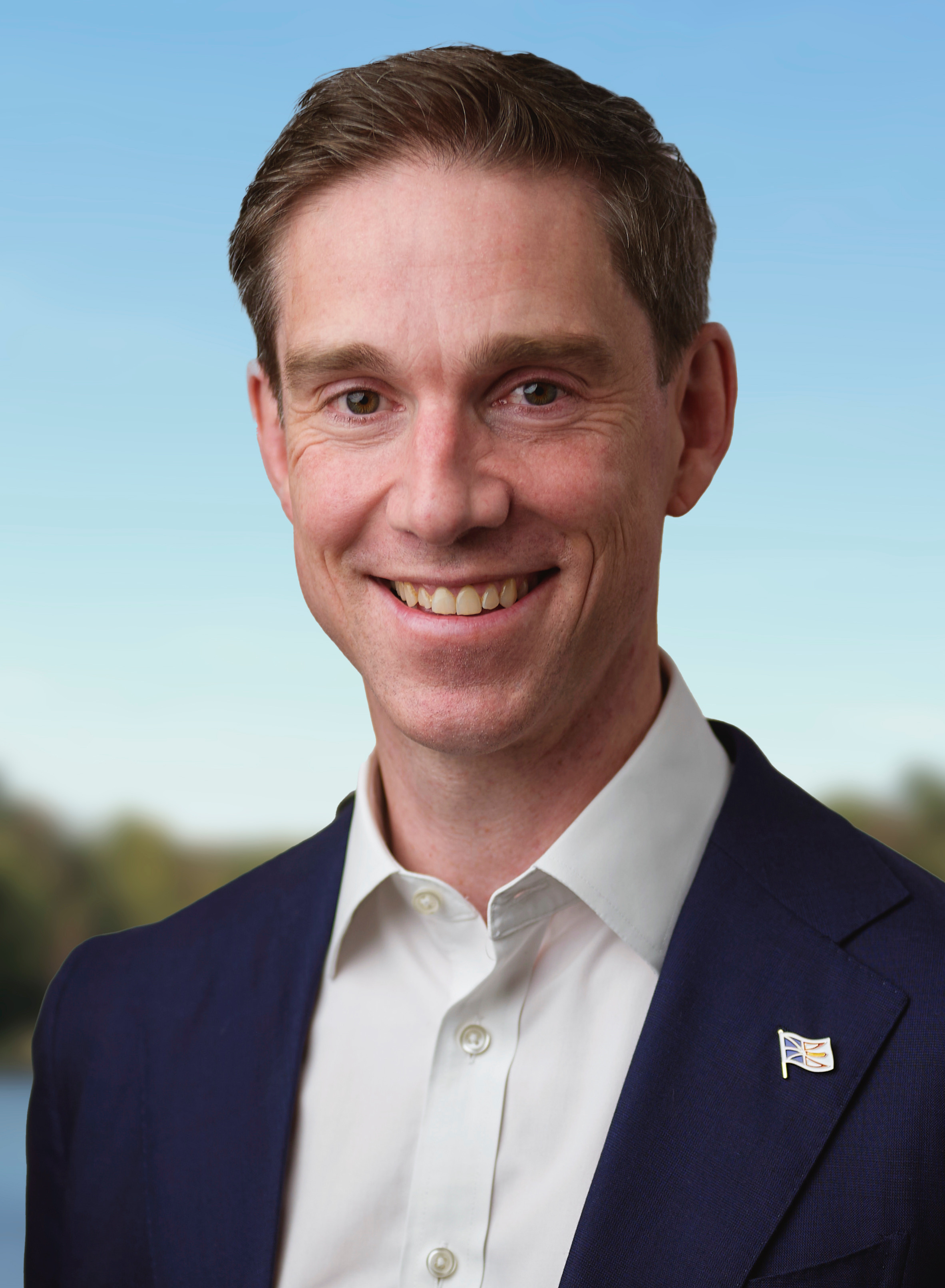
- Incumbent; John Hogan
- Term length: While leader of the largest party not in government
- Inaugural holder: John Gilbert Higgins
- Formation: April 1, 1949

The leader of His Majesty's Loyal Opposition in Newfoundland and Labrador is a title traditionally held by the leader of the largest party not in government in the Newfoundland and Labrador House of Assembly.

== List ==
This list is incomplete

Portrait	Name Electoral district (Birth–Death)	Term of office	Party
	John Gilbert Higgins; MHA for St. John's East (1891–1963)	1949–1951	Progressive Conservative
	Peter John Cashin; MHA for Ferryland (1890–1977)	1951–1953	Progressive Conservative
	Malcolm Mercer Hollett; MHA for St. John's West (1891–1985)	1953–1959	Progressive Conservative
	James Greene; MHA for St. John's East (1928–2014)	1960–1966	Progressive Conservative
	Noel Murphy; MHA for Humber East (1915–2005)	1966	Progressive Conservative
	Gerry Ottenheimer (Note: Ottenheimer served from 1967 to 1969 following Murphy's loss of his seat in the 1966 election.); MHA for St. John's East (1934–1998)	1967–1969	Progressive Conservative
	Anthony Joseph Murphy (Note: Acting for Progressive Conservative Party leader Frank Moores who was elected party leader but did not gain a seat in the House of Assembly until 1971.); MHA for St. John's East (1913–1996)	1969–1971	Progressive Conservative
	Frank Moores; MHA for Humber West (1933–2005)	1971–1972	Progressive Conservative
	Joey Smallwood; MHA for Placentia East (1900–1991)	1972	Liberal
	Edward Roberts; MHA for White Bay North (1940–2022)	1972–1977	Liberal
	Steve Neary (Note: Rowe defeated Roberts for the Liberal leadership in October 1977 and entered the House via a by-election in December. Stephen Neary was Leader of the Opposition in the interim. St. John's Evening Telegram, November 25, 1977.); MHA for LaPoile (1925–1996)	1977	Liberal
	Bill Rowe; MHA for Twillingate (born 1942)	1977–1979	Liberal
	Don Jamieson; MHA for Bellevue (1921–1986)	1979–1980	Liberal
	Len Stirling; MHA for Bonavista North (1937–2024)	1980–1982	Liberal
	Steve Neary (Note: Neary became Opposition Leader after Liberal leader Sterling lost his seat in the 1982 general election. He subsequently became interim party leader as well.); MHA for LaPoile (1925–1996)	1982–1984	Liberal
	Leo Barry; MHA for Mount Scio (1943–2026)	1984–1987	Liberal
	Roger Simmons (Note: Simmons was not party leader. He was Opposition Leader between the time that Leo Barry was deposed as Liberal leader and new leader Clyde Wells' acquisition of a seat via a by-election.); MHA for Fortune-Hermitage (born 1939) (Interim)	1987	Liberal
	Clyde Wells; MHA for Windsor-Buchans (born 1937)	1987–1989	Liberal
	Tom Rideout; MHA for Baie Verte-Springdale (born 1948)	1989–1991	Progressive Conservative
	Len Simms; MHA for Grand Falls-Windsor-Buchans (1943–2026)	1991–1995	Progressive Conservative
	Lynn Verge; MHA for Humber East (born 1951)	1995–1996	Progressive Conservative
	Loyola Sullivan; MHA for Ferryland (born 1949)	1996–1998	Progressive Conservative
	Ed Byrne; MHA for Kilbride (born 1963)	1998–2001	Progressive Conservative
	Danny Williams; MHA for Humber West (born 1949)	2001–2003	Progressive Conservative
	Roger Grimes; MHA for Exploits (born 1950)	2003–2005	Liberal
	Gerry Reid; MHA for The Isles of Notre Dame (born 1954)	2005–2007	Liberal
	Yvonne Jones; MHA for Cartwright-L'Anse au Clair (born 1968) (Interim)	2007–2010	Liberal
	Kelvin Parsons; MHA for Burgeo and La Poile	2010–2011	Liberal
	Yvonne Jones; MHA for Cartwright-L'Anse au Clair (born 1968)	2011–2012	Liberal
	Dwight Ball; MHA for Humber Valley (born 1957)	2012–2013	Liberal
	Eddie Joyce; MHA for Bay of Islands (born 1956)	2013	Liberal
	Dwight Ball; MHA for Humber Valley (born 1957)	2013–2015	Liberal
	Paul Davis; MHA for Topsail-Paradise (born 1961)	2015–2018	Progressive Conservative
	David Brazil; MHA for Conception Bay East - Bell Island (born 1963) (Interim)	2018	Progressive Conservative
	Ches Crosbie; MHA for Windsor Lake (born 1953)	2018–2021	Progressive Conservative
	David Brazil; MHA for Conception Bay East - Bell Island (born 1963) (Interim)	2021–2023	Progressive Conservative
	Tony Wakeham; MHA for Stephenville-Port au Port (born 1956)	2023–2025	Progressive Conservative
	John Hogan; MHA for Windsor Lake (born 1978)	2025–present	Liberal
