= Tom Marshall (politician) =

Canadian lawyer and politician (born 1946)

The Honourable Tom Marshall ECNL KC

11th Premier of Newfoundland and Labrador
- In office January 24, 2014 – September 26, 2014
- Monarch: Elizabeth II
- Lieutenant Governor: Frank Fagan
- Preceded by: Kathy Dunderdale
- Succeeded by: Paul Davis

Member of the Newfoundland and Labrador House of Assembly for Humber East
- In office October 21, 2003 – November 3, 2014
- Preceded by: Bob Mercer
- Succeeded by: Stelman Flynn

Minister of Finance, President of Treasury Board, Minister Responsible for the Human resource Secretariat, Minister Responsible for the NL Liquor Corporation, Minister Responsible for the office of the chief information officer, Minister Responsible for the public service Commission, And Minister Responsible for the public service Secretariat of Newfoundland and Labrador
- In office October 9, 2013 – January 24, 2014
- Preceded by: Jerome Kennedy
- Succeeded by: Charlene Johnson
- In office October 7, 2009 – January 16, 2013
- Preceded by: Jerome Kennedy
- Succeeded by: Jerome Kennedy
- In office December 29, 2006 – October 31, 2008
- Preceded by: Loyola Sullivan
- Succeeded by: Jerome Kennedy

Attorney General of Newfoundland and Labrador
- In office October 19, 2012 – January 16, 2013
- Preceded by: Felix Collins
- In office October 31, 2008 – October 7, 2009
- Preceded by: Jerome Kennedy
- Succeeded by: Felix Collins
- In office November 6, 2003 – March 2005
- Preceded by: Kelvin Parsons
- Succeeded by: Tom Rideout

Minister of Natural Resources, And Minister of Forestry and Agrifoods of Newfoundland and Labrador
- In office January 16, 2013 – October 9, 2013
- Preceded by: Jerome Kennedy
- Succeeded by: Derrick Dalley

Minister of Justice, Acting Minister of Health and Community Services, And Minister of Intergovernmental Affairs of Newfoundland and Labrador
- In office October 31, 2008 – October 7, 2009
- Preceded by: Jerome Kennedy
- Succeeded by: Felix Collins
- In office November 6, 2003 – December 29, 2006
- Preceded by: Kelvin Parsons
- Succeeded by: Tom Osborne

Personal details
- Born: Thomas Wendell Marshall; October 26, 1946 (age 80) Glace Bay, Nova Scotia, Canada
- Party: Progressive Conservative
- Occupation: Lawyer

Thomas Wendell Marshall, KC (born October 26, 1946) is a Canadian lawyer and politician. He was the 11th premier of Newfoundland and Labrador, from January 24, 2014 to September 26, 2014.

Marshall represented the district of Humber East in the House of Assembly for the Progressive Conservative Party from 2003 until 2014. He had been a senior minister in the cabinets of Danny Williams and Kathy Dunderdale, having served in the portfolios of Minister of Finance and President of Treasury Board, Attorney General, Minister of Natural Resources, Minister of Justice and Minister of Intergovernmental Affairs. Prior to entering politics Marshall was a successful lawyer in Corner Brook. His father is Jack Marshall, who served as a Member of Parliament and Canadian Senator.

== Background ==
Marshall grew up in Corner Brook, Newfoundland and Labrador. He is the son of the late Sylvia and Jack Marshall. His father was a Progressive Conservative member of Parliament for Humber – St. George's – St. Barbe, and a Canadian senator. Marshall attended Memorial University of Newfoundland, where he was awarded a bachelor of commerce degree in 1969. He went on to Dalhousie University in Halifax, Nova Scotia where he was awarded a bachelor of laws degree in 1972. He joined the law firm of Barry, Wells and Monaghan as an associate lawyer, and became a partner in the firm of Barry, Wells, Monaghan, Seaborn and Marshall in 1975. He remained senior partner with the firm of Monaghan, Marshall, Murphy and Watton until his election to the House of Assembly in 2003.

== Politics ==
In the 2003 provincial election, Marshall was the Progressive Conservative Party (PC Party) candidate in the district of Humber East. He ran against Bob Mercer, the Liberal incumbent and Minister of Environment in the Roger Grimes government. The PC Party won a majority government in the election, and Marshall easily defeated Mercer to become the MHA for Humber East. Marshall was easily re-elected in the 2007 provincial election, winning 84 per cent of the popular vote in his district. In the 2011 election Marshall won 78 per cent of the popular vote in Humber East. He resigned on November 3, 2014.

Since his first election win Marshall has held a number of senior cabinet roles within the governments of Danny Williams and Kathy Dunderdale. Weeks after the 2003 election he was sworn in as the Minister of Justice and Attorney General. On March 11, 2005, he also assumed the role as Minister responsible for Intergovernmental Affairs, a portfolio Williams had held since becoming premier. The following year Marshall became the Minister of Finance and President of Treasury Board, a portfolio he would hold on several occasion. His first stint as Finance Minister lasted until 2008, when he returned to the Department of Justice. In a 2009 cabinet shuffle Marshall was re-appointed Minister of Finance and President of the Treasury Board, and took the additional responsibility go Attorney General in 2012. In January 2013, left the Department of Justice and became Minister of Natural Resources, while remaining Attorney General. When his successor as Minister of Finance resigned suddenly in October of that year he would return to the portfolio. After being sworn in as the 11th Premier of Newfoundland and Labrador, Marshall appointed Charlene Johnson as his successor at the Department of Finance and Felix Collins became the Attorney General.

=== Minister of Finance ===
In his first budget as Minister of Finance the province recorded a $76 million surplus. His budget cut personal taxes and paid $66 million onto the province's debt. In his 2008 budget Marshall announced a $1.4 billion budget surplus, the largest surplus to that date. Like his previous budget Marshall continued to cut personal income taxes and pay down debt, the budget also spent $673 million on infrastructure throughout Newfoundland and Labrador. Marshall's 2010 budget projected a $194.3 million deficit for that coming year despite that he increased overall spending and cut personal and small business taxes. By the time Marshall delivered his 2011 budget the deficit he projected the previous year had turned into a $485-million surplus, due to higher than expected oil revenues. The budget was the first under new premier Kathy Dunderdale and was delivered five months before the provincial election. The $7.3 billion dollar budget increased spending, but despite a budget surplus it would add to the province's net debt causing widespread anger and mistrust amongst the voting class.

== Premier ==
Marshall was sworn in as the 11th Premier of Newfoundland and Labrador on January 24, 2014, succeeding Dunderdale who resigned the post on the same day. Marshall became the country's second Jewish premier, after Dave Barrett. He held the post until September 2014, when Paul Davis was elected as PC leader.

=== Leadership ===
When Williams announced his resignation as premier and Progressive Conservative leader on November 22, 2010, Marshall was considered a potential candidate in the race to succeed him. However, Marshall announced in December 2010, that he would not be a candidate and would instead be endorsing Dunderdale, who was later acclaimed leader. He became interim leader of the Progressive Conservative Party and Premier of Newfoundland and Labrador on January 24, 2014. Marshall has stated he is only interested in being premier for several months, until the party selects a permanent leader.

=== Public opinion ===
Dunderdale's resignation came after two years of dwindling public support for her, her government and the PC Party. In a Corporate Research Associates (CRA) poll conducted after Marshall became premier, support increased in these three areas. Satisfaction with government saw the largest increase, with 57 per cent of those poll indicating they approved of government's performance under Marshall. Compared to 20 per cent who were dissatisfied and 23 per cent who did not have an opinion or indicated it was too soon to tell. In the previous CRA poll conducted in November 2013, only 42 per cent of respondents were satisfied with the government's performance under Dunderdale. 32 per cent of respondents thought Marshall was the best choice for Premier, compared to 38 per cent who preferred Liberal leader Dwight Ball and 11 per cent who preferred New Democratic Party leader Lorraine Michael. Support for the Progressive Conservatives increased marginally in the poll and the party remained in a distanced second place. The poll showed the Liberal Party was the choice of 53 per cent of respondents, followed by PC Party with 33 per cent and the NDP were third with 13 per cent support. Satisfaction with government continued to increase under Marshall's leadership, with a CRA poll conducted throughout May 2013 showing that 64 per cent of those polled were either completely or mostly satisfied with government. Despite an increase in government satisfaction, Marshall's personal number as choice for premier only increased to 33 per cent. He trailed Ball who was the choice of 38 per cent, while Michael was well behind at 11 per cent. Support for the PC Party also dropped slightly, to the benefit of the NDP. The Liberals led in the poll with 53 per cent indicating they supported them, the Progressive Conservatives were second at 29 per cent and the NDP third at 16 per cent.

== Post-politics ==
In 2017, Marshall endorsed Ches Crosbie in the 2018 provincial PC leadership race. Marshall supported Tony Wakeham in the 2023 provincial PC party leadership race.

== Electoral history ==
2011 Newfoundland and Labrador general election
Party	Candidate	Votes	%	±%
Progressive Conservative	Tom Marshall	3,494	78.25%	–
New Democratic	Marc Best	593	13.28%	
Liberal	Charles Murphy	378	8.47%	

2007 Newfoundland and Labrador general election
Party	Candidate	Votes	%	±%
Progressive Conservative	Tom Marshall	4,160	83.99	–
Liberal	Mike Hoffe	537	10.84	
New Democratic	Jean Graham	256	5.17	

2003 Newfoundland and Labrador general election
Party	Candidate	Votes	%	±%
Progressive Conservative	Tom Marshall	3,976	60.24	–
Liberal	Bob Mercer	2,624	39.76	
