= Jim Walsh (Canadian politician) =

Canadian politician

The Honourable Jim Walsh ECNL

Member of the House of Assembly for Conception Bay East–Bell Island
- In office 1989–2003
- Preceded by: Leo Barry
- Succeeded by: Dianne Whalen

Minister of Tourism and Culture
- In office July 17, 1992 – August 26, 1994
- Preceded by: Office Established
- Succeeded by: Office Abolished

Minister of Works, services, And Transportation
- In office February 17, 2003 – November 6, 2003
- Preceded by: Percy Barrett
- Succeeded by: Tom Rideout

Personal details
- Born: James P. Walsh; 1949 (age 76–77)

James P. Walsh (born 1949) is a businessperson and former politician in Newfoundland and Labrador. He represented Conception Bay East – Bell Island in the Newfoundland House of Assembly from 1989 to 2003.

He was born in Corner Brook, Newfoundland and Labrador. Walsh married Barbara Best; the couple had four children. Before entering politics, he was managing director of the Young Group of Companies. Walsh was also president of Hospitality Newfoundland and was host of a CBC television show called Quiz Kids.

Walsh ran unsuccessfully for the Bay of Islands seat in the Newfoundland assembly in 1979. He was elected to the assembly in 1989 for Mount Scio–Bell Island and was reelected in 1993, 1995 and 1999. He was defeated when he ran for reelection in 2003. He served in the provincial cabinet as Minister of Tourism and Culture and as Minister of Works, Services and Transportation, Parliamentary Sect. to Minister of Finance and Treasury Board, and Parliamentary Sect. responsible for Newfoundland Housing. From 2004 until 2009 Walsh served with the Transportation Safety Board.

In January 2010, he was convicted of fraud and breach of trust in a legislative spending scandal in which over 115 Members had overspent their constituency allowances. Walsh was granted parole in July of that year. As stated in the Canadian Parliamentary Review Vol 30 No. 4 2007, according to the Auditor General, MHAs and staff frequently sought guidance from the Legislative staff and were poorly advised. "The House staff provided inconsistent advice and even prepared some members claims. The result was a mishmash of expenditures that were at times unethical and fraudulent."
