= Bob Mercer (politician) =

Canadian politician

The Honourable Bob Mercer ECNL

Minister of Environment
- In office February 17, 2003 – November 5, 2003
- Preceded by: Kevin Aylward
- Succeeded by: Tom Osborne

MHA for Humber East
- In office 1996–2003
- Preceded by: Lynn Verge
- Succeeded by: Tom Marshall

Personal details
- Party: Liberal

Bob Mercer is a former Canadian politician. He represented the riding of Humber East in the Newfoundland and Labrador House of Assembly from 1996 to 2003. He was a member of the Liberals.

Prior to his election to the House of Assembly, Mercer served as mayor of Pasadena from 1993 to 1996. He subsequently served a second term as mayor from 2005 to 2009.
