= 2018 Progressive Conservative Party of Newfoundland and Labrador leadership election =

Canadian political party leadership election

- April 27–29, 2018
- Opinion polls
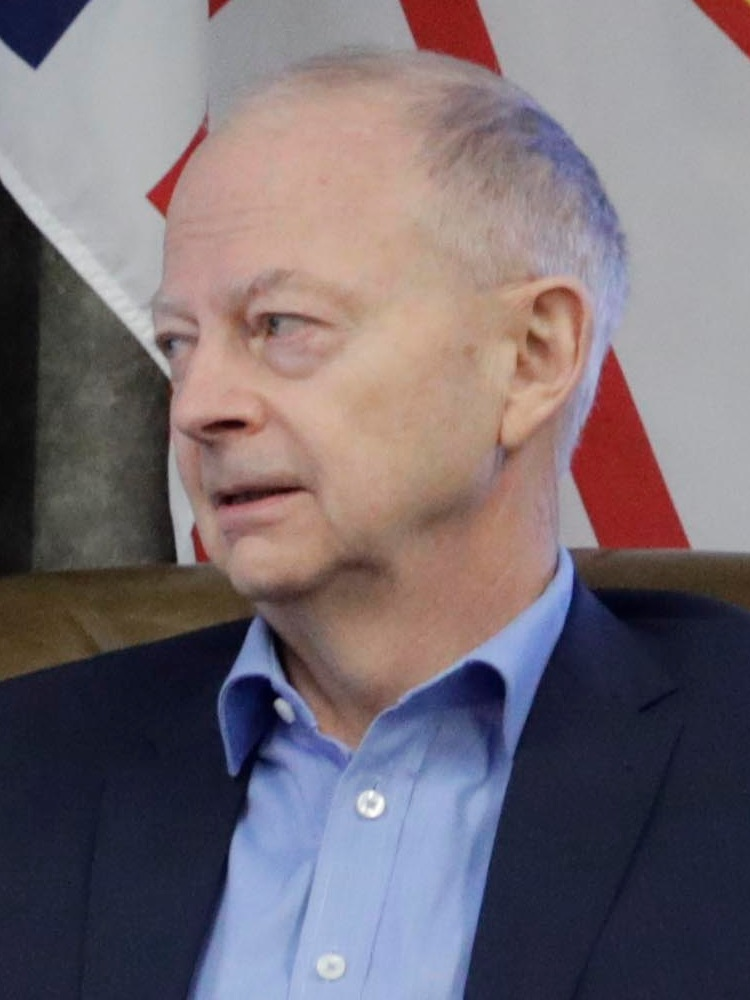

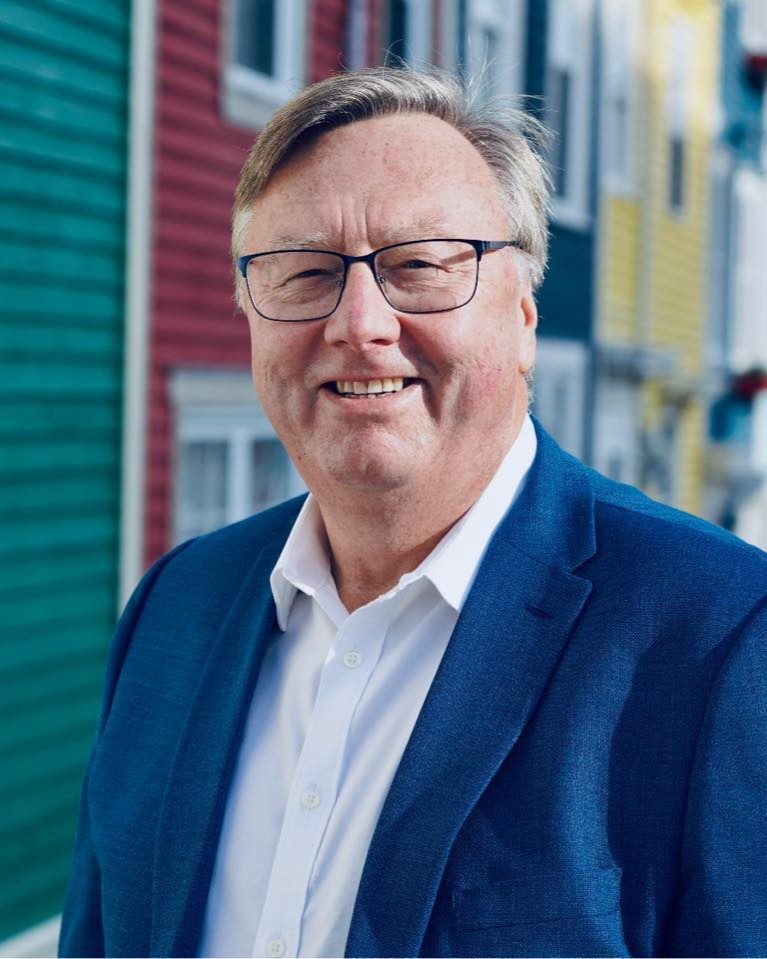
Candidate	Ches Crosbie	Tony Wakeham
Points	2,299 pts (57.47%)	1,701 pts (42.53%)
Leader before election
Paul Davis
Elected Leader
Ches Crosbie

2018 Progressive Conservative Party of Newfoundland and Labrador leadership election
- Date: April 28, 2018
- Convention: Delta Hotel; St. John's, NL
- Resigning leader: Paul Davis
- Won by: Ches Crosbie
- Ballots: 1
- Candidates: 2
- Entrance fee: $10,000.00
- Spending limit: $200,000.00

The Progressive Conservative Party of Newfoundland and Labrador leadership election, 2018 was held on April 27–29, 2018, to select a successor to Paul Davis who announced on October 11, 2016, that he planned to step down as leader once his replacement was elected. St. John's lawyer Ches Crosbie defeated former Health Authority CEO Tony Wakeham to become the new leader. 11,000 members joined the party during this leadership election, of which, just over 4,000 cast their ballots.

== Timing ==
On October 11, 2016, Progressive Conservative Party leader Paul Davis announced that he had written party president Mark Whiffen and asked for a leadership convention to be called. Davis, who had been facing a leadership review at the party's upcoming convention, stated he would remain party leader until his successor was chosen. Davis has since stated that will not rule out running again. The party subsequently delayed the leadership vote until 2018 in order to give the party time to change its leadership election system in its constitution from delegated to a mix of one-member-one vote and points per district.

Election Period means the period of time which begins by the death, retirement or resignation or announcement of the retirement or resignation, of the Leader of the Party; or in which Article 15-2 of the Constitution applies. For the purposes of the leadership selection process occurring between 2016 and 2018 the election period began on October 11, 2016.

To become a candidate, a person must have filed nomination papers with the Chief Electoral Officer by January 15, 2018. To vote, a member of the public must have become a member of the party by January 30, 2018. The election was conducted by mail-in balloting with all party members (as of January 30, 2018) eligible to vote. Ballots must have been returned by April 25, 2018 and were opened and counted at the party's Annual General Meeting on April 28, 2018.

=== Rules ===
To apply to become an accredited candidate, a prospective or announced candidate shall:

a. be a Member of the Party;

b. be eligible to stand for election as a Member of the House of Assembly;

c. apply in writing, using Form B, to be accredited as a Leadership Candidate;

d. file a nomination form, using Form C, containing the

i. legible signatures,

ii. residential addresses,

iii. telephone numbers, and

iv. district associations of 100 individuals, representing 51% of electoral districts, who are registered Members or registered Supporters of the Party;

e. provide a non-refundable registration fee in the form of a certified cheque in the amount of $10,000.00 payable to the Progressive Conservative Party of Newfoundland and Labrador;

f. plus a $10,000.00 deposit, in the form of a certified cheque, the amount will be refunded, less any imposed penalties or deductions as per Rules 122, 123 and 186(c).

== Declared candidates ==
=== Ches Crosbie ===
Background

Ches Crosbie is a prominent St. John's lawyer and son of former provincial and federal cabinet minister John Crosbie.

Date candidacy declared: October 24, 2017
Campaign website: www.chescrosbie.ca
Supporters
MHAs: Barry Petten, MHA for Conception Bay South (2015-); Jim Lester, MHA for Mount Pearl North (2017-)
Federal politicians: Michael Chong, MP for Wellington—Halton Hills
Former party leaders: Tom Marshall, former Premier of NL (2014); Tom Rideout, former Premier of NL (1989)
Former MHAs: Dan Crummell, former MHA for St. John's West (2011-2015); Joe Goudie, former MHA for Lake Melville (1975–1985); Roger Fitzgerald, MHA for Bonavista South (1993-2011); Bill Marshall, former MHA for St. John's East (1970-1989)
Former federal politicians: (1) John Crosbie (MP for St. John's West, 1976-1993 and Ches Crosbie's father), Loyola Hearn, former MP
Other prominent supporters: Memorial University Campus Conservatives; Memorial University Progressive Conservatives (PCMUN); Linda Bishop, Chairperson of the Save Our People Action Committee (SOPAC); Karla MacFarlane, interim leader of Nova Scotia PC Party; Tony Oliver, former vice-president of the provincial party; Paul Walsh, disabilities advocate

Policies

Crosbie states his platform will focus on three issues: rebuilding the economy, restoring confidence in government and revitalizing the PC Party. Specifically, introducing laws to prevent government overspending, and bring in what he calls an "honesty in politics" law. Crosbie is also calling for a repeal of the 15% tax on insurance premiums.

=== Tony Wakeham ===
Background

Tony Wakeham is the former CEO Labrador-Grenfell Health. He also worked in senior health management roles in St. John's, Clarenville and Grand Falls-Windsor. Wakeham grew up in Placentia and studied economics at Memorial University. Wakeham, lives in Kippens, and also has deep roots in the sport of basketball, both as a player and coach at the provincial and federal levels. He and his wife Patricia have two adult children.

Date candidacy declared: December 5, 2017
Campaign website: www.tonywakeham2019.com
Supporters
MHAs: David Brazil, MHA for Conception Bay East-Bell Island (2010-2023); Kevin Parsons, MHA for Cape St. Francis (2008-2021)
Federal politicians:
Former MHAs: Susan Sullivan, MHA for Grand Falls-Windsor-Buchans (2007-2015); Patty Pottle, MHA for Torngat Mountains (2007-2011); Paul Shelley, MHA for Baie Verte-Springdale (1993-2007); Paul Oram, MHA for Terra Nova (2003-2009); Wade Verge, former Provincial Cabinet Minister and Speaker of the House Assembly; Fred Stagg, MHA (1971-1985); Len Simms, former party leader (1991–1995).
Prominent Supporters: Ed Ring, former Information & Privacy Commissioner; Paul Thomey, former President of the St. John's Board of Trade; Chris Andrews, musician & member of Shanneyganock

Policies

Wakeham supports introducing recall legislation.

== Debates ==
Two debates took place during the course of the leadership campaign.

- March 15, 2018: Debate sponsored by the MUN Political Science department. Professor Stephen Tomblin moderating.
- March 26, 2018: Debate sponsored by the Ferryland District Association. NTV provincial affairs correspondent Michael Connors moderating.

== Opinion polling ==
Polling Firm	Date of Polling	Link	Ches Crosbie	Tony Wakeham	Undecided
MQO	January 29, 2018		37	14	50

== Declined ==
- David Brazil - MHA for Conception Bay East-Bell Island (2010–2023), former Minister of Service NL (2014) and Minister of Transportation and Works (2014-2015). Endorsed Wakeham and is serving as his campaign manager.
- Ryan Cleary - NDP MP for St. John's South—Mount Pearl (2011-2015), 2015 PC candidate in Windsor Lake
- Sandy Collins - Former MHA for Terra Nova (2009-2015), former Minister of Tourism, Culture and Recreation (2014-2015)
- Keith Hutchings - MHA for Ferryland (2007–2019), former Minister of Innovation, Business and Rural Development (2011-2013), Minister of Fisheries and Aquaculture (2013-2014), Minister of Municipal and Intergovernmental Affairs (2014-2015)
- Steve Kent - MHA for Mount Pearl North (2007-2017), former Minister of Municipal and Intergovernmental Affairs (2013-2014), Deputy Premier and Minister of Health (2014-2015), and leadership candidate in the 2014 race, placing third. Accepted the position of CAO of Mount Pearl in October 2017 and subsequently resigned his seat.
- John Ottenheimer - Former MHA for St. John's East (1996-2007), former Minister of Education (2003-2004), Minister of Health and Community Services (2004-2006), and Minister of Intergovernmental Affairs (2006-2007), CEO of the Newfoundland and Labrador Housing Corporation (2015-2016), and runner-up in the 2014 leadership race.

== Results ==
For the first time in the party's history, the voting was conducted through a one-member, one-vote points system, which divided the province into forty districts worth a hundred points each. The points were allocated based on each candidates share of the popular vote.

Point allocation by ballot
Candidate	Ballot 1
Name	Points
Ches Crosbie	2,298.92; 57.47%
Tony Wakeham	1,701.08; 42.53%
Total points	4,000.00
