= Richard J. Greene =

Canadian politician

Member of the Newfoundland and Labrador House of Assembly for Bell Island
- In office 1959–1962
- Preceded by: Joseph O'Driscoll
- Succeeded by: Steve Neary

Personal details
- Born: November 26, 1924 Newfoundland
- Died: June 18, 2007 (aged 82) St. John's, Newfoundland and Labrador, Canada
- Party: Progressive Conservative Party of Newfoundland and Labrador
- Occupation: Lawyer

Richard Joseph Greene (November 26, 1924 – June 18, 2007) was a Canadian politician who was elected to the Newfoundland and Labrador House of Assembly in the 1959 provincial election. He represented the electoral district of Bell Island as a member of the Progressive Conservative Party of Newfoundland and Labrador. He lived in St. John's and was a lawyer.
