= Paul Davis (Canadian politician) =

Canadian politician (born 1961)

The Honourable Paul Davis ECNL
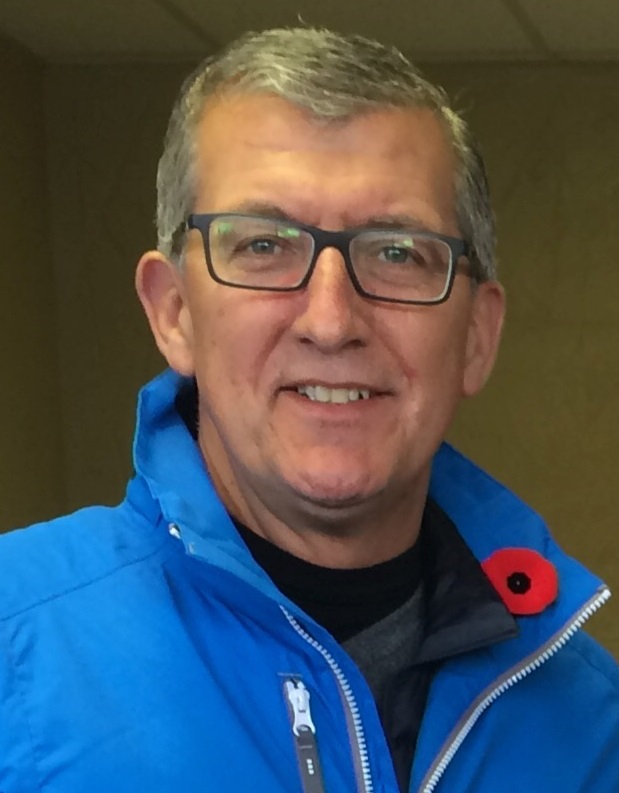

12th Premier of Newfoundland and Labrador
- In office September 26, 2014 – December 14, 2015
- Monarch: Elizabeth II
- Lieutenant Governor: Frank Fagan
- Deputy: Steve Kent
- Preceded by: Tom Marshall
- Succeeded by: Dwight Ball

Leader of the Opposition
- In office December 14, 2015 – May 14, 2018
- Preceded by: Dwight Ball
- Succeeded by: David Brazil

Leader of the Progressive Conservative Party of Newfoundland and Labrador
- In office September 13, 2014 – April 28, 2018
- Preceded by: Tom Marshall
- Succeeded by: Ches Crosbie

Member of the Newfoundland and Labrador House of Assembly for Topsail-Paradise Topsail (2010-2015)
- In office April 5, 2010 – November 2, 2018
- Preceded by: Elizabeth Marshall
- Succeeded by: Paul Dinn

Minister of Health and Community Services
- In office May 1, 2014 – July 2, 2014
- Preceded by: Susan Sullivan

Minister of Child, Youth and Family Services of Newfoundland and Labrador
- In office October 9, 2013 – May 1, 2014
- Preceded by: Charlene Johnson
- Succeeded by: Clyde Jackman

Minister of Transportation and Works
- In office October 19, 2012 – October 9, 2013
- Preceded by: Tom Hedderson
- Succeeded by: Nick McGrath

Minister of Service NL
- In office October 28, 2011 – October 19, 2012
- Preceded by: New office
- Succeeded by: Nick McGrath

Deputy Mayor of Conception Bay South
- In office 2005–2010

Personal details
- Born: Paul Alfred Davis; June 17, 1961 (age 65)
- Party: Progressive Conservative
- Spouse: Cheryl Davis
- Occupation: Police officer

Paul Alfred Davis (born June 17, 1961) is a Canadian politician who was the leader of the Progressive Conservative Party of Newfoundland and Labrador and Leader of the Opposition in the province. Davis served as the 12th premier of Newfoundland and Labrador from September 26, 2014, to December 14, 2015. He was the member of the House of Assembly for Topsail-Paradise from 2015 to 2018, previously representing Topsail from 2010 to 2015.

Davis won the leadership of the Progressive Conservatives at the 2014 leadership convention on September 13, 2014, and was subsequently sworn in as premier. Previous to this he had served as Minister of Health and Community Services, Minister of Child, Youth and Family Services, Minister of Transportation and Works, and Minister of Service NL. Prior to entering cabinet in 2011, he served as the Legislative Assistant for the Department of Municipal Affairs. Before entering provincial politics Davis was the media relations officer for the Royal Newfoundland Constabulary (RNC) and the Deputy Mayor of Conception Bay South.

== Background ==
Davis was born on June 17, 1961. He joined the Royal Newfoundland Constabulary (RNC) in 1985, after graduating from Holland College. Between 1987 and 1992 Davis worked with Corner Brook Division of the Constabulary, before being reassigned to the Criminal Investigation Division in St. John's. During his service with the RNC he also had assignment in Property Crimes, Major Crimes and the Child Abuse Sexual Assault Units. Davis became the RNC Media Relations Officer in 2006, and served in that role until he entered provincial politics. When Davis retired from police work in 2010, his accolades include a Crime Stoppers Police Officer of the Year award and a Police Exemplary Service Medal.

Davis was also a town councillor in the St. John's area municipality of Conception Bay South, and reached the position of Deputy Mayor. He was first elected in 2001 and re-elected in 2005 and 2009.

Davis's wife Cheryl, a realtor, was elected to the Conception Bay South town council in the 2017 elections as a Councillor-At-Large.

== Provincial politics ==
Following the appointment of member of the House of Assembly Elizabeth Marshall to the Canadian Senate, Davis announced he would seek the Progressive Conservative nomination in her former district of Topsail. In a four-person race for the nomination, Davis was easily elected as the party's candidate, winning 882 out of 1215 ballots cast. The following month Davis was elected to the House of Assembly after winning 82 per cent of the popular vote in the by-election. He subsequently resigned as a member of the RNC and was sworn in as the member of the House of Assembly (MHA) for Topsail on April 5, 2010. On July 27, 2010, Premier Danny Williams appointed Davis as the Legislative Assistant for the Department of Municipal Affairs.

On May 12, 2011, Davis was acclaimed as the Progressive Conservatives candidate in Topsail for that October's general election. Just weeks later in early June, Davis announced that he had been diagnosed with non-Hodgkin lymphoma in April. Due to his illness he would be unable to make public appearances till he finished his cancer treatments, and would work from his home. Due to his battle with cancer Davis was unable to campaign in public during the October election, despite this was re-elected with 68 per cent of the popular vote.

=== Minister of Service NL ===
On October 28, 2011, Premier Kathy Dunderdale appointed Davis as the Minister of Service NL and Minister Responsible for the Government Purchasing Agency, Office of the Chief Information Officer, and the Workplace Health, Safety and Compensation Commission.

=== Minister of Transportation and Works ===
In a cabinet shuffle held on October 19, 2012, Davis became the Minister of Transportation and Works and Minister Responsible for the Newfoundland and Labrador Housing Corporation.

In February 2013, Davis announced that the government would decommission and sell the MV Nonia, a ferry that was purchased by the previous Liberal government in 1999. The ferry was purchased for $1 million and had been plagued with problems, with $18 million having been spent over the years to keep it afloat. In March it was revealed that the government had spent $3 million in repairs on the Nonia only months before the decision was made to sell it. The ferry ended up being sold for just $76,222.

In May 2013, Davis announced changes to the Green Bay ferry service. In an effort to find savings, the dock at Shoal Arm would no longer be a stop on the ferry route. The route would now include only Pilley's Island, Long Island, and Little Bay Islands. In 2011–2012, the 45 minute sailing between Little Bay Islands and Shoal Arm had an average ridership of just three vehicles and five passengers.

=== Minister of Child, Youth and Family Services ===
On October 9, 2013, Davis was appointed Minister of Child, Youth and Family Services. The following week Davis announced that the department would start flying social workers into the isolated Innu community of Natuashish on a rotational basis, two weeks in and two weeks out, to help resolve issues in recruitment. Earlier the year the chief of the community went to the media after he found seven children under the age of 12 in a house by themselves inhaling gas.

On December 3, 2013, Davis announced changes to the provinces adoption law. By modernizing the law Davis stated that the government would “streamline and expedite” the adoption system. The changes saw the definition of relative expanded; great-aunts and great-uncles will be able to adopt children through a simpler process. Changes were made to make it easier for an adopted person to reunite with their parents or relatives, once they reach adulthood. As well adult adoptions can now occur because of the updated legislation. This allows for step-children to be adopted by a parent to receive such things as health benefits or inheritance, and allows for people to adopt a person in their care who is developmentally delayed.

=== Minister of Health and Community Services ===
On May 1, 2014, Premier Tom Marshall held a cabinet shuffle and appointed Davis as the Minister of Health and Community Services, replacing Susan Sullivan. Davis' appointment came after the government reversed a previous decision to provide cancer treatment at a new hospital in Corner Brook. Sullivan had stated for years that the population in the Corner Brook area did not warrant radiation therapy or a Positron emission tomography (PET) scanner. However, Marshall, who was sworn in as premier in January 2014, announced that both radiation therapy and a PET scanner would be part of the new hospital. In June 2014, Davis along with Marshall announced a company had been hired to evaluate the best plan for providing radiation therapy at the Corner Brook hospital.

Davis resigned as Minister of Health and Community Services on July 2, 2014, to seek the leadership of the Progressive Conservative Party of Newfoundland and Labrador.

=== Party leadership ===
On January 24, 2014, Kathy Dunderdale resigned as Premier of Newfoundland and Labrador and leader of the Progressive Conservative Party. Davis announced days later that he would not be a candidate in the race to succeed her. He later stated that he ruled out a bid in January because of health issues related to his 2011 cancer diagnosis. Businessman Frank Coleman eventually became the lone candidate in the race and was expected to be sworn in as party leader on July 5, 2014. However, on June 18, 2014, Coleman announced that due to a health issue in his family he would not takeover as party leader or as premier. The party cancelled their July convention and scheduled a new leadership convention for September 13, 2014.

On July 2, 2014, Davis launched his bid for the leadership of the Progressive Conservative Party at an event in Paradise. Davis received endorsements from 14 members of the Progressive Conservative caucus, including eight cabinet ministers. He was also endorsed by several former politicians, including former party leaders Len Simms and Loyola Sullivan. Davis was generally perceived as being the frontrunner in the race, which was also contested by former ministers Steve Kent and John Ottenheimer.

On August 8, 2014, Abacus Data released an opinion poll that showed Davis was the favourite among the public to win the leadership of the PC Party. 34 per cent of those polled said they would select Davis as leader if they were casting a vote in the leadership race. Kent placed second with the support of 27 per cent and Ottenheimer was third with of 21 per cent. 18 per cent of those polled were undecided. Among those who voted PC in the 2011 election 40 per cent picked Davis as their choice for leader. Kent had the support of 26 per cent, Ottenheimer was third with 24 per cent and 10 per cent were undecided. Abacus also asked those surveyed which party they would vote for in a provincial election under each leadership candidate. Davis performed better than both Kent and Ottenheimer, but under his leadership the PC Party would still trail the Liberals. With Davis at the helm, 46 per cent of respondents would vote Liberal, 38 per cent would vote PC and 16 per cent would vote NDP.

Davis won the leadership of the Progressive Conservative Party with 52% of the vote on an unexpected third ballot at the party's convention on September 13, 2014. Davis trailed Ottenheimer on the first ballot by 36 votes, Kent finished third and dropped off the ballot. Kent immediately announced he was throwing his support behind Davis. When the second ballot votes were announced chief electoral officer John Noseworthy announced there was no clear majority. Davis received 340 votes, Ottenhimer won 339 and there was one spoiled ballot. Davis won a clear majority on third ballot receiving 351 votes of the 678 cast.

=== Premiership (2014-15) ===
Davis was sworn in as the 12th Premier of Newfoundland and Labrador on September 26, 2014. It is believed that Davis is the first premier in Canadian history to have previously worked as a police officer.

==== Public safety ====
During his swearing in ceremony Davis stated that one of his first priorities will be to strike an advisory committee on crime, which he had promised during his leadership bid. The commitment came after an 11-year-old boy had been stabbed the previous evening while participating in a skills competition on a soccer field near Davis' district of Topsail. Davis, who went to the soccer field following the stabbing, acknowledged the victim in his first speech as premier. He later told reporters that the advisory committee would bring together people involved in corrections, law enforcement, mental health and advocacy.

At the swearing in ceremony for his cabinet on September 30, 2014, Davis announced that the Department of Justice would now be titled the Department of Public Safety and that the Fire and Emergency Services portfolio would now fall under the department. In a surprise move Davis announced that St. John's lawyer Judy Manning would serve as the department's new minister, despite not being an elected member of the House of Assembly. Davis received criticism for dropping justice from the department's name as well as the appointment of Manning, due to her being unelected and not willing to seek a seat in the House of Assembly until the next election. Representative from the provincial branch of the Canadian Bar Association met with Davis on October 10, 2014, to question him on why the former Department of Justice was replaced with the Department of Public Safety. Following the meeting Davis announced the department would be renamed the Department of Justice and Public Safety.

In February 2015, Manning announced that negotiations between her and the City of St. John's had reached an impasse regarding the St. John's Regional Fire Department (SJRFD) being the Public Safety Answering Point for 911 service on the Avalon Peninsula. As part of a new province-wide 911 service the SJRFD was expected to provide the service to the entire Avalon Peninsula as opposed to just the St. John's Metro Area, where they had been providing the service for 40 years. The issues that led to the impasse were control over the operating budget and intellectual property rights. Manning stated that she had already spoken to the Royal Newfoundland Constabulary about them being the Public Safety Answering Point in the event an agreement could not be reached with the SJRFD. Davis stepped in and announced that he would meet with St. John's Mayor Dennis O'Keefe regarding the negotiations. Following their meeting it was announced that an agreement had been reached for the SJRFD to be the Public Safety Answering Point for the entire Avalon Peninsula.

On March 12, 2015, Davis announced that Manning would no longer serve in cabinet following a shuffle that saw her and two other ministers leave the provincial cabinet. Manning was replaced as Minister of Justice and Public Safety by Darin King while Felix Collins took over as Attorney General. Davis stated that he had planned to call an election this Spring but that changed when he decided to eliminate eight seats from the House of Assembly and he was not prepared to have Manning serve as an unelected minister for a full year.

==== Democratic reform ====
On January 15, 2015, Davis announced that the House of Assembly would be opening the following week so that his government could bring forth legislation to reduce the number of electoral districts in the province by 10. Under the province's current legislation a committee was supposed to be set up in 2016 to review electoral boundaries. Davis announced he was speeding up the process in order to reduce the number of districts before the next election, which is supposed to be called by September 2015. Currently there are 48 electoral districts in the province. His government expects that by reducing the number to 38 the government will save $10 million over four years. Along with reducing the number of electoral districts, the Davis government will also review MHA pension plans and identify measures to increase the participation of elected members in the House of Assembly.

==== Education policy ====
The first speech from the throne of the Davis government was read on April 21, 2015. The speech - which was read by the Lieutenant Governor - announced that there would be an overhaul of the kindergarten to grade 12 school curriculum. The government promised to create a 21st-century curriculum and bring together educational leaders to review the province's math curriculum. The speech also announced that a multi-year K-12 infrastructure development plan and a new plan for early childhood learning development would be released.

On April 24, 2015, acting Education Minister Derrick Dalley announced that there would be 77.5 teaching positions cut for the 2015–2016 school year. Class size caps for grade 4-6 would go up by one student per class, while the cap for Grades 7 through 9 would increase by two students per class. Dalley also announced that with over 150 teachers set to retire new teachers would still need to be hired for the upcoming school year to make up the difference.

==== Fiscal policy ====
When Davis appointed his cabinet he kept Ross Wiseman as Minister of Finance and President of Treasury Board, Wiseman had taken over the portfolio earlier that month. On November 27, 2014, Davis announced that government was imposing a freeze on discretionary spending and imposing an extra layer of approval on all hiring. The announcement was made following a decision by OPEC not to cut oil production despite a major drop in the price of oil since the summer of 2014. When the 2014 budget was released the government forecasted a deficit of more than half a billion dollars and were predicting oil to trade at $105 a barrel. When OPEC made their decision not to cut production oil was trading below $80 a barrel. For every dollar the price of oil is below the provincial government's projected amount, the treasury loses roughly $25 million. Davis would not rule out spending cuts or tax increases in the 2015 budget.

==== Downpayment Assistance Program ====
On October 22, 2015, Davis announced the Downpayment Assistance Program, which is to be administered by the Newfoundland and Labrador Housing Corporation. The program is a two-year pilot project which provides downpayment loans to first-time homebuyers who have low-to-moderate incomes. Applicants must have a household income of $65,000 or less. The downpayment loans range from between $4,500 and $12,500 and successful applicants will not have to begin repaying their loans until five years after the purchase of their home.

==== Health policy ====
Davis appointed leadership rival Steve Kent as Deputy Premier and Minister of Health and Community Services. During the leadership contest both Davis and Kent had promised a health care summit. In November it was announced that the Premier's Health Care Summit would take place on January 14, 2015, in St. John's. Consultations throughout the province began in November to allow residents the opportunity to provide feedback in advance of the summit. Kent announced in December 2014, that work on a new mental health and addictions strategy would begin in early 2015.

On April 29, 2015, Davis along with his Minister of Health and Community Services and Minister of Seniors, Wellness and Social Development announced a plan to partner with private and non-profit providers to create 360 long-term care beds throughout the island portion of the province. A private or non-profit provider would construct and operate new long-term care facilities and the provincial government would pay a per-bed fee. The Davis government hired Partnerships BC - a crown corporation in British Columbia specializing in public private partnerships - to facilitate between government and the potential providers. The move was condemned by the public sector unions who called the move an attack on their workers.

==== Public opinion ====
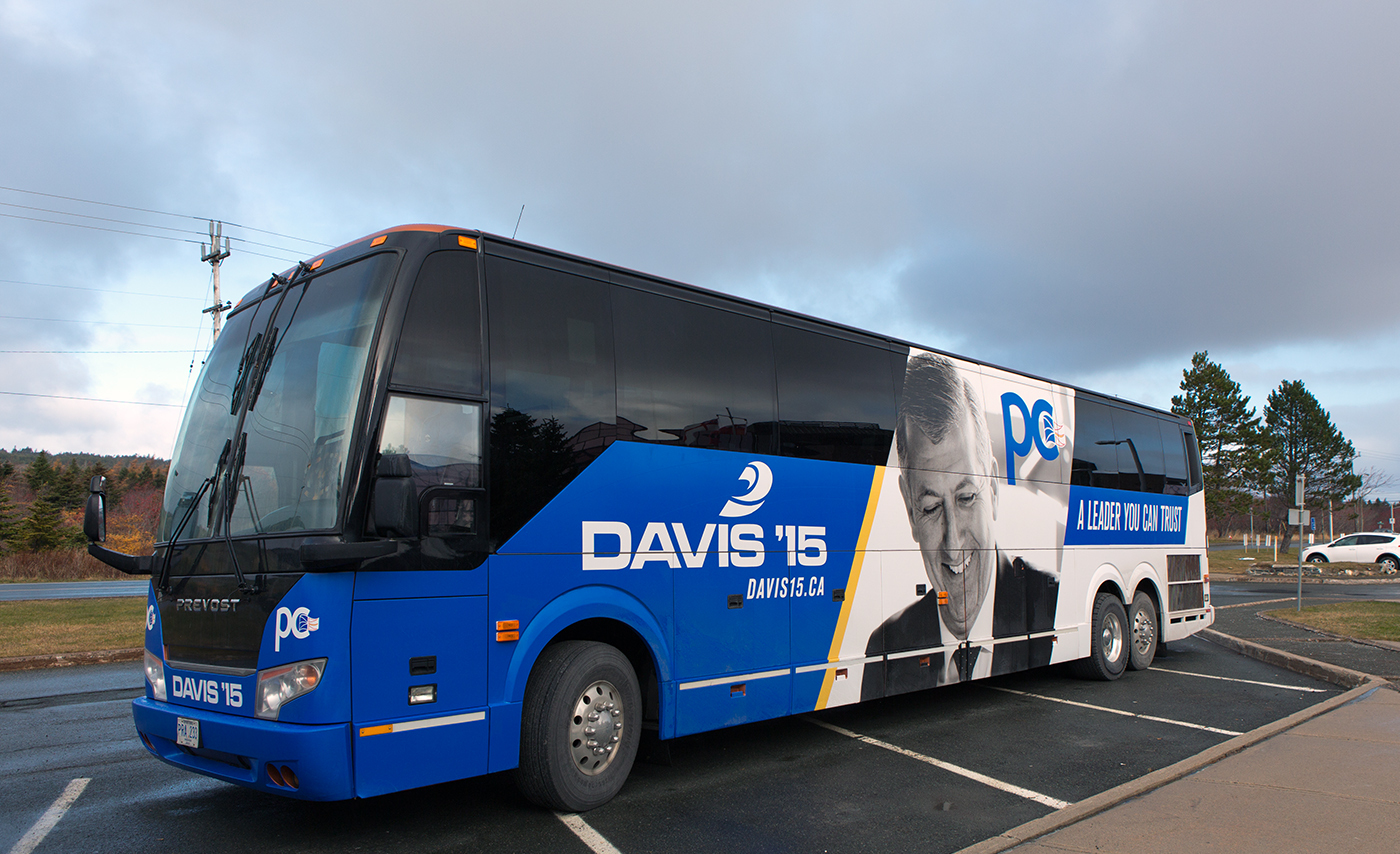
Davis 2015 PC Campaign Bus

When Davis took over the leadership of the Progressive Conservatives the party was significantly trailing the Liberals in public opinion polls. Support for the PC Party had eroded since 2012 and the Liberals saw a surge in support at the expense of both the Tories and the NDP throughout 2013. Just weeks before Davis won the leadership race a Corporate Research Associates (CRA) poll showed the Liberals had 32 point lead over the PC Party.

A CRA poll released on December 8, 2014, their first poll since Davis became premier, showed support for the Progressive Conservatives at 29 per cent. This was a small increase over the 26 per cent the party recorded three months earlier. The PC Party still trailed the Liberals by a significant margin, with that party having the support of 60 per cent of those polled. Support for the NDP had dropped to 10 per cent. Liberal leader Dwight Ball also led Davis as choice for premier. 46 per cent of respondents polled chose Ball as the best choice to be premier, a six per cent increase in three months. 26 per cent felt Davis was the best choice to be premier, while nine per cent felt NDP leader Lorraine Michael was the best choice. Satisfaction with the Davis government was at 50 per cent, while dissatisfaction was at 31 per cent. The remainder of those polled did not provide an answer or said it was too soon to tell. Quarterly polls released by CRA over the next year showed little movement in voters intentions when it came to support for the Progressive Conservatives or Davis as choice for premier. Satisfaction with the Davis government also remained around 50 per cent, according to CRA. In the spring and summer of 2015, the New Democrats saw a jump in support at the expense of the Liberal Party and were now challenging the Tories for second place. Support for the NDP had increased from 10 per cent in November 2014 to 25 per cent in August 2015. At the same time support for the Liberals declined by 12 percentage points and the Tories fell by two percentage points. After a majority government win by the federal Liberal Party in the October 19, 2015, election their provincial counterparts saw their support surge in the lead up to the provincial election scheduled for November 30, 2015. An Abacus Data poll released on November 6, 2015, showed support for the Liberal Party at 66 per cent. The PC Party was a distant second at 19 per cent and the NDP followed closely at 15 per cent. A Forum Research poll released the following day showed almost identical numbers for the three parties as the Abacus poll. In the final week of the campaign Abacus Data released a second poll showing little change in the political landscape. The Liberals led with 64 per cent, followed by the PCs at 22 per cent and the NDP at 13 per cent. However, two polls released by Forum Research in the final week of the campaign showed a drop in support for the Liberals. Their November 24, poll pegged Liberal support at 52 per cent, followed by the PC Party at 29 percent, and the NDP at 19 per cent. Forum Research released their final poll on November 29, one day before the provincial election. This poll had Liberal support at 54 per cent, trailed by the PCs at 31 per cent and the New Democrats at 15 per cent. This final Forum Research poll also showed that Davis’ approval ratings had risen throughout the campaign while his disapproval ratings had stayed the same. Both Ball and NDP leader Earle McCurdy had seen their approval ratings hold relatively steady but both leaders saw their disapproval ratings increase. In Forum Research's November 6, poll 25 per cent of those polled thought Davis was the best choice for premier compared to 37 per cent who felt Ball was the best choice. In their November 29, poll 33 per cent thought Davis was the best choice for premier compared to 35 per cent who thought Ball was the best choice.

An Angus Reid poll released on December 16, 2014, which rated the approval of Canadian premiers showed that Davis had one of the lowest approval ratings in the country. 34 per cent approved of Davis' performance as premier, 37 per cent were dissatisfied and 28 per cent were not sure. Manitoba Premier Greg Selinger was the only premier to have a lower approval rating than Davis. When Angus Reid released the approval ratings of Canadian premiers in March 2015, Davis saw his approval rating increase to 41 percent, which ranked him among the more popular premiers in the country. His disapproval rating had also increased to 43 percent. The next two quarterly polls by Angus Reid in June and September 2015, showed a drop in support for Davis. In June his approval rating stood at 39 percent and by September it had fallen to 31 percent. Davis led his party to defeat in the November 30, 2015, provincial election but an Angus Reid poll conducted during his final weeks as premier showed a jump in support for him. The poll, which was released in December 2015, showed that his support stood at 43 percent. 46 percent of respondents disapproved of his performance. Davis’ support in this poll was the highest he had recorded throughout the course of his premiership.

=== Leader of the Opposition (2015-2018) ===
Following the 2015 election, the Progressive Conservative Party was reduced to only 7 seats after previously controlling the government since 2003. Davis continued as the party's leader until 2018 and served as Leader of the Opposition.

==== Public opinion ====
Davis's support did not change much since the election, however support for Premier Dwight Ball dropped below support for Davis. A poll in June 2016 showed that Davis was the most popular of the 3 party leaders with support from 35% of respondents. However, another poll suggested that his party's approval was below that of the New Democratic Party led by Earle McCurdy.

==== Resignation ====
On October 11, 2016, Davis announced his plan to step down as leader of the Progressive Conservative Party. He sent a letter to PC Party president Mark Whiffen requesting a leadership convention be held to elect a new leader. Davis, who had been facing a leadership review at the party's upcoming Annual General Meeting, stated that he would remain leader until his successor was chosen. Following the election of Davis's successor on April 28, 2018, Davis stated that he will remain as the MHA for Topsail-Paradise until at least the end of the current sitting of the House of Assembly in June.

On May 13, 2018, Davis announced he would resign as Leader of the Opposition. As the new party leader, Ches Crosbie, did not have a seat in the House of Assembly, MHA David Brazil was appointed Leader of the Opposition on May 14, 2018. On October 18, Davis announced his resignation as MHA effective November 2, 2018.

== Federal politics ==
In October 2020, Davis announced that he would seek the federal Conservative nomination for Avalon and run in the 2021 Canadian federal election. On December 17, 2020, it was announced that Davis had lost the nomination to Matthew Chapman, the 2019 candidate in the riding. In 2021, he was appointed executive director of the Gathering Place.

== Electoral record ==
Topsail-Paradise - 2015 Newfoundland and Labrador general election
Party	Candidate	Votes	%	±%
Progressive Conservative	Paul Davis	3381	58.3%	–
Liberal	Rex Hillier	2137	36.9%	–
New Democratic	Chris Bruce	281	4.8%	–

Topsail - 2011 Newfoundland and Labrador general election
Party	Candidate	Votes	%	±%
Progressive Conservative	Paul Davis	3860	68.35%	-13.07
NDP	Brian Nolan	1507	26.69%	+15.53
Liberal	Nic Reid	280	4.96%	-2.14

}

Topsail, By-Election - March 16, 2010 On the Senate appointment of Elizabeth Marshall, January 29, 2010
Party	Candidate	Votes	%	±%
Progressive Conservative	Paul Davis	2737	81.42	-1.62
NDP	Brian Nolan	374	11.16	+2.91
Liberal	Shane Kennedy	238	7.10	-1.61
