= Steve Neary =

Canadian politician (1925–1996)

Leader of the Opposition (Newfoundland)
- In office 1982–1984
- Preceded by: Len Stirling
- Succeeded by: Leo Barry
- In office 1977–1977
- Preceded by: Edward Roberts
- Succeeded by: Bill Rowe

Member of the Newfoundland House of Assembly for La Poile
- In office September 16, 1975 – April 2, 1985
- Preceded by: Allan Evans
- Succeeded by: Cal Mitchell

Member of the Newfoundland House of Assembly for Bell Island
- In office November 19, 1962 – September 16, 1975
- Preceded by: Richard J. Greene
- Succeeded by: William Doody

Personal details
- Born: June 21, 1925 Bell Island, Dominion of Newfoundland
- Died: June 7, 1996 (aged 70) St. John's, Newfoundland, Canada
- Party: Liberal
- Other political affiliations: Newfoundland Democratic Party (1959-1962)
- Spouse: Jane Maher
- Children: 4

Stephen Aloysius Neary (June 21, 1925 – June 7, 1996) was a Newfoundlander and Canadian politician and cabinet minister who served as the provincial Leader of the Official Opposition.

== Early life ==
Neary was born in Bell Island on June 21, 1925. He worked at the Argentia Naval Base until 1945 before returning home and moving onto a job at the Dominion Steel Company. While working there, he helped unionize the office employees before serving on the municipal council.

== Politics ==
He was active with the Newfoundland Federation of Labour serving as its secretary-treasurer and ran for office as a candidate for the Newfoundland Democratic Party in the 1959 provincial election.

In 1962, he was elected to the Newfoundland House of Assembly as a Liberal and, as a backbench MHA, took on the legal industry for charging excessive fees and sparked a Royal Commission of Inquiry into the matter. In 1968 he was appointed to cabinet and was Minister of Public Services from 1969 to 1972 when the government was defeated. After losing the Liberal nomination for his riding in 1975 he ran, and was elected as an Independent Liberal. Rejoining the party, he ran unsuccessfully for leader in 1977. He was appointed Leader of the Opposition on May 3, 1982 after party leader Len Stirling failed to win a seat in the 1982 provincial election and also served as interim party leader from 1983 to 1984. He retired from provincial politics in 1985. He attempted to win a seat in the House of Commons of Canada in a St. John's East federal by-election in 1987 but was defeated.

== Later life ==
After his retirement, Neary wrote a book about the German U-boat attack on Bell Island in the second World War, called Enemy on our Doorstep. He also devoted a great deal of time to Bell Island and was instrumental in raising monuments, and to creating a museum. He died at his home in St. John's on June 7, 1996.
