= 2024 Conception Bay East–Bell Island provincial by-election =

By-election in Newfoundland and Labrador, Canada

- January 30, 2024

Riding of Conception Bay East–Bell Island
- Turnout: 44.72%
| | First party | Second party | Third party |
|---|---|---|---|
| | LIB | PC | NDP |
| Candidate | Fred Hutton | Tina Neary | Kim Churchill |
| Party | Liberal | Progressive Conservative | New Democratic |
| Last election | 33.08% | 56.19% | 10.73% |
| Popular vote | 2,603 | 2,152 | 846 |
| Percentage | 45.90% | 37.95% | 14.92% |
| Swing | ▲12.82 | ▼18.24 | ▲4.19 |
MHA before election
David Brazil
Progressive Conservative
Elected MHA
Fred Hutton
Liberal

The 2024 Conception Bay East–Bell Island provincial by-election was held on January 30, 2024. The election was triggered by the resignation of Progressive Conservative MHA David Brazil. The election was originally scheduled for January 29, but was moved a day later due to winter storm warning.

== Candidates ==
Four candidates filed for election:

- Fred Hutton (Liberal) - former journalist, advisor to Premier Andrew Furey.
- Tina Neary (Progressive Conservative) - town councillor in Portugal Cove-St. Philip's.
- Kim Churchill (New Democratic) - Deaf rights activist.
- Darryl Harding (Independent) - Former president of the Progressive Conservative riding association, and town councillor in Portugal Cove-St. Philip's.

== Timeline ==
- November 10, 2023: David Brazil announces his resignation, effective December 29.
- November 22: Kim Churchill announces her intentions to seek the NDP nomination.
- November 24: Former Progressive Conservative party president and leadership candidate Eugene Manning announces he would not be running in the by-election.
- November 27: The NDP names Kim Churchill as their candidate.
- November 28: The Progressive Conservatives announce Tina Neary as their candidate.
- November 30: An internal letter is sent to the Progressive Conservative Party executive from former riding association president Darryl Harding complaining that Neary was chosen as the candidate without the support of the party. He would run as an independent.
- December 13: The Liberal Party announces Fred Hutton as their candidate.
- December 29: David Brazil's resignation comes into effect.
- December 30: The chief electoral officer official drops the writs, beginning the campaign.
- January 7, 2024: NDP candidate Kim Churchill kicks off her campaign.
- January 7: Deadline for candidate nominations.
- January 22: Advanced poll. Deadline to vote in person via special ballot or to request a special ballot.
- January 28: It was announced that the election would be postponed until January 30 due to a storm warning.
- January 29: Original election day.
- January 30: Election day. At 9:18pm local time, VOCM calls the election for Hutton.
- February 29: MHA Hutton was appointed Minister of Housing and Minister responsible for the Newfoundland and Labrador Housing Corporation.

== Campaign ==
The main campaign issues in the by-election were the Bell Island ferry service and healthcare.

== Results ==
Newfoundland and Labrador provincial by-election, January 30, 2024 Resignation of David Brazil
| Party | Candidate | Votes | % | ±% |
|---|---|---|---|---|
| Liberal | Fred Hutton | 2,603 | 45.90 | +12.82 |
| Progressive Conservative | Tina Neary | 2,152 | 37.95 | –18.24 |
| New Democratic | Kim Churchill | 846 | 14.92 | +4.19 |
| Independent | Darryl Harding | 70 | 1.23 | New |
| Total valid votes | | 5,671 | | |
| Turnout | | | 44.72 | –5.40 |
| Eligible voters | | 12,682 | | |
| Liberal gain from Progressive Conservative | | Swing | | +15.53 |

== Result at previous general election ==
2021 Newfoundland and Labrador general election: Conception Bay East–Bell Island
| Party | Candidate | Votes | % | ±% |
|---|---|---|---|---|
| Progressive Conservative | David Brazil | 3,215 | 56.19 | –17.60 |
| Liberal | Lynn Hammond | 1,893 | 33.08 | +6.87 |
| New Democratic | Gavin Will | 614 | 10.73 | |
| Total valid votes | | 5,722 | 98.69 | |
| Total rejected ballots | | 76 | 1.31 | –0.50 |
| Turnout | | 5,798 | 50.12 | –5.44 |
| Eligible voters | | 11,569 | | |
| Progressive Conservative hold | | Swing | | –12.23 |
Source(s) "Officially Nominated Candidates General Election 2021" (PDF). Elections Newfoundland and Labrador. "2021 Provincial General Election Report" (PDF).

== See also ==
- List of Newfoundland and Labrador by-elections
