= David Brazil (politician) =

Canadian politician (born 1963)

The Honourable David Brazil ECNL
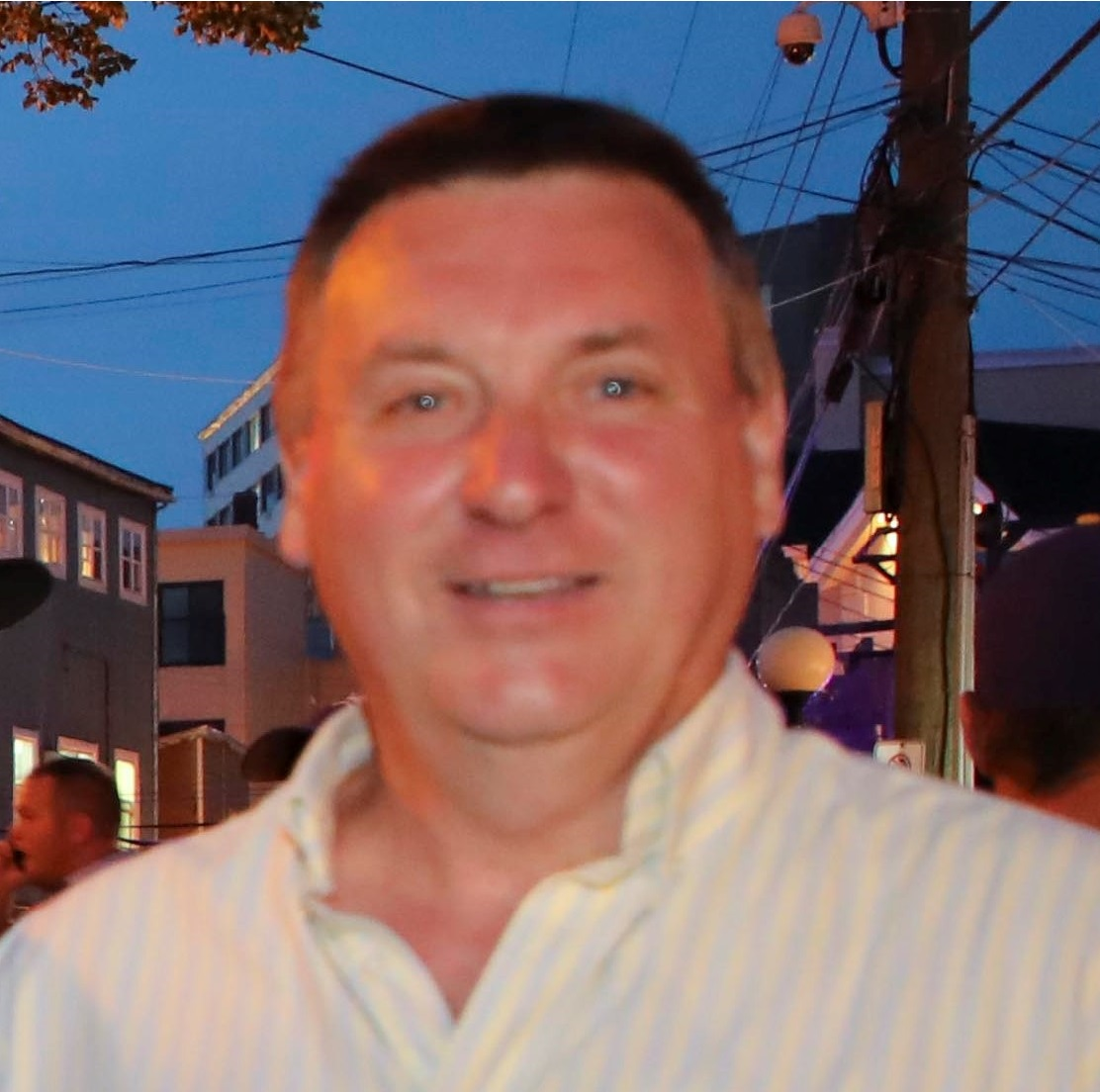
- Brazil in 2018

Member of the Newfoundland and Labrador House of Assembly for Conception Bay East–Bell Island
- In office December 20, 2010 – December 29, 2023
- Preceded by: Dianne Whalen
- Succeeded by: Fred Hutton

Minister of Service NL, Minister responsible for the government purchasing agency, Minister responsible for the office of the chief information officer, And Minister Responsible for the Workplace Health, Safety, and Compensation Commission
- In office July 17, 2014 – September 30, 2014
- Preceded by: Dan Crummell
- Succeeded by: Tony Cornect

Interim Leader of the Progressive Conservative Party of Newfoundland and Labrador
- In office March 31, 2021 – October 14, 2023
- Preceded by: Ches Crosbie
- Succeeded by: Tony Wakeham

Leader of the Opposition in Newfoundland and Labrador
- In office March 31, 2021 – October 14, 2023
- Preceded by: Ches Crosbie
- Succeeded by: Tony Wakeham
- In office May 14, 2018 – October 12, 2018
- Preceded by: Paul Davis
- Succeeded by: Ches Crosbie

Minister of Transportation and Works
- In office September 30, 2014 – December 14, 2015
- Preceded by: Nick McGrath
- Succeeded by: Al Hawkins

Personal details
- Born: September 20, 1963 (age 63)
- Party: Conservative Party of Canada; Progressive Conservative
- Spouse: Alice Dalton m.1987
- Occupation: Businessman public servant

David J. Brazil (/ˈbræzəl/ BRAZ-əl; born September 20, 1963) is a Canadian politician from Newfoundland and Labrador. He represented the district of Conception Bay East - Bell Island in the Newfoundland and Labrador House of Assembly from 2010 until 2023. He served as interim Leader of the Progressive Conservative Party of Newfoundland and Labrador and interim Leader of the Opposition from 2021 to 2023.

Brazil previously served as Opposition Leader in 2018 between the resignation of Paul Davis and the election of Ches Crosbie as MHA.

== Political career ==
=== Government member ===
In November 2010, Brazil won the nomination to be the Progressive Conservative Party of Newfoundland and Labrador candidate in a by-election for the electoral district of Conception Bay East – Bell Island defeating five other candidates for the nomination. The by-election was being held to replace the late Dianne Whalen who had died a month earlier.

The by-election was called for December 2, 2010 with two other candidates running for the New Democrats and the Liberals. One week before the by-election, on November 25, Premier Danny Williams announced that he would retire from politics on December 3, 2010. With the announcement that the Premier would be resigning it left many wondering if Brazil, who was initially thought to easily hold on to the seat for the Tories, would be able to win now that the party's popular leader was stepping down. However, on December 2, 2010, Brazil defeated both the New Democratic and Liberal Party candidates, winning 66% of the popular vote. The percentage of the vote was consistent with previous by-election wins the PCs had before the announcement that Williams was retiring.

Brazil was re-elected with 55% of the vote in the 2011 election. On July 17, 2014, Brazil was appointed to the Executive Council of Newfoundland and Labrador as Minister of Service NL. When Paul Davis took over as premier in September 2014, he moved Brazil to Minister of Transportation and Works.

=== Opposition member ===
Brazil was re-elected in the 2015 election, defeating Liberal Danny Dumaresque by almost 1,900 votes.

In 2017, Brazil declined to seek the leadership of the PC Party and endorsed Tony Wakeham in the 2018 election, serving as his campaign manager.

Following the election of Ches Crosbie as PC leader in April 2018, Paul Davis announced he would resign as Leader of the Opposition. Since Crosbie did not have a seat in the House of Assembly when elected leader, Brazil was appointed the Leader of the Opposition on May 14, 2018. On September 20, 2018 Crosbie won the district of Windsor Lake in a by-election, therefore becoming Leader of the Opposition.

Brazil was re-elected in the 2019 provincial election. Brazil was re-elected in the 2021 provincial election. PC leader Crosbie was personally defeated in his district of Windsor Lake. The Liberals under Furey won a majority government. On March 31, 2021, Crosbie resigned as leader and Brazil was appointed interim Leader and interim Leader of the Opposition. In 2022, Brazil suffered a major heart attack but returned to work a few months later. On January 16, 2023, Brazil announced he would not be a candidate in the 2023 provincial PC leadership election. He was succeeded as leader by Tony Wakeham on October 14, 2023.

On November 10, 2023, Brazil announced his resignation as MHA effective December 29, 2023. The provincial by-election to replace him was held on January 30, 2024 electing Liberal Fred Hutton.

=== Federal politics ===
On June 12, 2024, Brazil announced that he was seeking the federal conservative nomination in St. John's East for the 2025 Canadian federal election. Brazil was subsequently acclaimed the nomination but lost in the election placing a distant second behind Liberal incumbent Joanne Thompson.

At the time of the 2025 Canadian federal election, he lived in St. John's, Newfoundland and Labrador.

== Electoral results ==
2025 Canadian federal election: St. John's East
Party	Candidate	Votes	%	±%	Expenditures
Liberal	Joanne Thompson	28,681	62.28	+17.14	$85,697.61
Conservative	David Brazil	11,941	25.93	+7.84	$74,080.02
New Democratic	Mary Shortall	5,172	11.23	−23.61	$103,699.91
Green	Otis Crandell	159	0.35	N/A	$543.97
Communist	Samuel Crête	98	0.21	N/A	$0.00
Total valid votes/expense limit		46,051	99.05	+0.15	$124,970.38
Total rejected ballots		440	0.95	–0.15	
Turnout		46,491	70.94		
Eligible voters		65,536			
Liberal notional hold		Swing		+4.65	
Source: Elections Canada
Note: number of eligible voters does not include voting day registrations.

2021 Newfoundland and Labrador general election: Conception Bay East–Bell Island
Party	Candidate	Votes	%	±%
Progressive Conservative	David Brazil	3,215	56.19	–17.60
Liberal	Lynn Hammond	1,893	33.08	+6.87
New Democratic	Gavin Will	614	10.73	
Total valid votes		5,722	98.69	
Total rejected ballots		76	1.31	–0.50
Turnout		5,798	50.12	–5.44
Eligible voters		11,569		
Progressive Conservative hold		Swing		–12.23
Source(s) "Officially Nominated Candidates General Election 2021" (PDF). Elections Newfoundland and Labrador. "2021 Provincial General Election Report" (PDF).

2019 Newfoundland and Labrador general election
Party	Candidate	Votes	%	±%
Progressive Conservative	David Brazil	4,365	73.8	
Liberal	Cyril Hayden	1,551	26.2	
Total valid votes				
Total rejected ballots				
Turnout				
Eligible voters				

2015 Newfoundland and Labrador general election
Party	Candidate	Votes	%
Progressive Conservative	David Brazil	3,463	59.22
Liberal	Danny Dumaresque	1,582	27.05
New Democratic	Bill Kavanagh	803	13.73
Total valid votes		5,848	100.00

2011 Newfoundland and Labrador general election
Party	Candidate	Votes	%	±%
Progressive Conservative	David Brazil	3,059	55.00%	−11.28%
NDP	Bill Kavanagh	2,290	41.17%	+14.97%
Liberal	Kim Ploughman	213	3.83%	−3.68%

Conception Bay East - Bell Island: By-election – December 2, 2010 On the death of Dianne Whalen, October 3, 2010
Party	Candidate	Votes	%	±%
Progressive Conservative	David Brazil	2638	66.28%	−5.51%
NDP	George Murphy	1043	26.20%	+15.96%
Liberal	Joy Buckle	299	7.51%	−10.46%
