= Tom Farrell (Canadian politician) =

Canadian politician

MHA for Humber East
- In office 1971–1979
- Preceded by: Clyde Wells
- Succeeded by: Lynn Verge

Personal details
- Born: November 25, 1924 Sligo, Ireland
- Died: April 14, 2012 (aged 87)
- Party: Progressive Conservative
- Occupation: Physician

Tom Farrell (November 25, 1924 – April 14, 2012) was a Canadian politician. He represented the riding of Humber East in the Newfoundland and Labrador House of Assembly from 1971 to 1979. He was a member of the Progressive Conservatives.
