= Ches Crosbie =

Canadian politician

Ches Crosbie KC
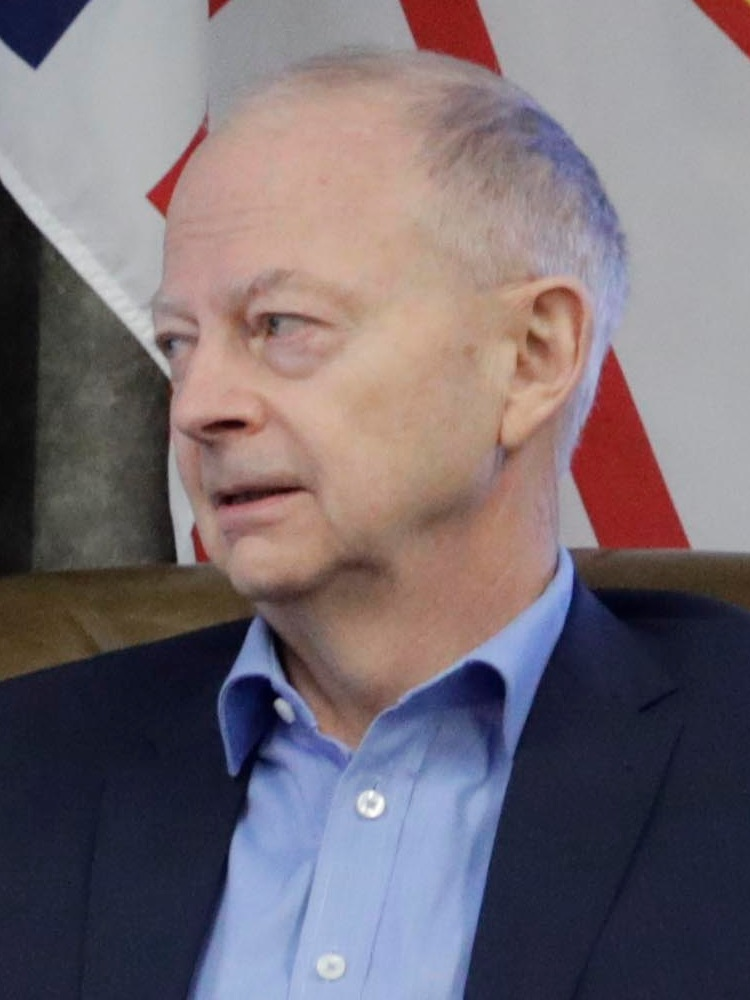

Leader of the Opposition (Newfoundland and Labrador)
- In office October 12, 2018 – March 31, 2021
- Preceded by: David Brazil
- Succeeded by: David Brazil

Leader of the Progressive Conservative Party of Newfoundland and Labrador
- In office April 28, 2018 – March 31, 2021
- Preceded by: Paul Davis
- Succeeded by: David Brazil (interim)

Member of the Newfoundland and Labrador House of Assembly for Windsor Lake
- In office October 12, 2018 – March 27, 2021
- Preceded by: Cathy Bennett
- Succeeded by: John Hogan

Personal details
- Born: Chesley Furneaux Crosbie; June 12, 1953 (age 73) St. John's, Newfoundland and Labrador, Canada
- Party: Progressive Conservative
- Relations: Chesley Crosbie (grandfather), Sir John Chalker Crosbie (great-grandfather)
- Parent(s): John Crosbie and Jane Crosbie
- Occupation: Lawyer

Chesley Furneaux Crosbie, KC (born 12 June 1953) is a Canadian lawyer and former politician. Crosbie was elected leader of the Progressive Conservative Party of Newfoundland and Labrador on April 28, 2018 serving until March 31, 2021. He served as the Leader of the Opposition in the Newfoundland and Labrador House of Assembly from 2018 until 2021.

== Early life ==
Crosbie is the eldest of three children of Jane (Furneaux) and John C. Crosbie and was born and raised in St. John's. His father was a prominent figure in Newfoundland and Labrador and Canadian politics, a provincial and federal cabinet minister who also served as Lieutenant-Governor of the province (2008–13). Crosbie is also a grandson and namesake of Chesley A. Crosbie and the great-grandson of Sir John Crosbie, prominent businessmen and public figures in Newfoundland.

Crosbie's early education was at Bishop Feild College in St. John's, and at St. Andrews College in Aurora, Ontario. He was selected as Newfoundland and Labrador's Rhodes Scholar in 1976, studying jurisprudence at Oxford, and continued his legal studies at Dalhousie University. There he met his future wife, Lois Hoegg, a native of Stellarton, Nova Scotia. Hoegg was appointed as a judge to the Trial Division of the Supreme Court of Newfoundland and Labrador on June 1, 2007 and later appointed to the Court of Appeal on June 18, 2010. She elected supernumerary status on June 1, 2022 and retired on October 31, 2025. They have three daughters.

== Lawyer ==
On completing law school, Crosbie returned to St. John's and was admitted to the bar in 1983. He founded Ches Crosbie Barristers in 1991. The firm developed expertise in class actions, and Crosbie first came into the public eye as an advocate for breast cancer patients affected by delayed and erroneous test results (settled in 2009, see Cameron Inquiry), for the victims of moose-vehicle accidents, for users of video lottery terminals, and for the former residents of residential schools in Labrador (settled in 2016). Crosbie was appointed Queen's Counsel in 2004.

From an interest in helping injured children, Crosbie and his firm have given away thousands of bicycle helmets to young people across the province. He has worked on a pro bono basis with former shipyard employees attempting to get compensation for long-term health problems. He has also volunteered with heritage organizations such as the Sealer's Memorial and Interpretation Centre in Elliston, Trinity Bay, and worked with the Placentia Historical Society and the Town of Placentia to commemorate the 75th anniversary of the 1941 meeting of U.S. president Franklin D. Roosevelt and British prime minister Winston Churchill which established the Atlantic Charter.

== Politics ==
Crosbie's earliest involvement in politics came as a supporter of his father, who was a candidate for the leadership of the Progressive Conservative Party of Canada in 1983. He is a long-time provincial Progressive Conservative and federal Conservative supporter.

In 2014, Crosbie announced his candidacy for the federal constituency of Avalon. However, in 2015, his candidacy was rejected by the Conservative Party of Canada, reputedly as the result of his "playful barbs" concerning Prime Minister Stephen Harper in a Shakespearean-parody fundraising skit. His father, John Crosbie, then accused the federal Conservatives of squashing his son's candidacy because he was too independent and because Newfoundland senator David Wells wanted to keep his control over Newfoundland patronage appointments, an accusation that Wells denied.

=== Leader of the Progressive Conservative Party of Newfoundland and Labrador ===
In February 2017, Crosbie announced an exploratory candidacy for the leadership of the Progressive Conservative Party of Newfoundland and Labrador, following the resignation of leader and former premier Paul Davis. On April 28, 2018, Crosbie defeated Health Authority CEO Tony Wakeham to succeed Davis. The leadership convention operated under a mixed vote-points system in which a hundred points were awarded in each of 40 districts across the provinces, based on the percentage of vote each candidate won. The final tally was Crosbie with 2,298.92 and Wakeham with 1,701.08 points respectively.

In August 2018, Crosbie announced his candidacy for the district of Windsor Lake following the resignation of MHA Cathy Bennett. On September 20, 2018, Crosbie won the race and therefore became Leader of the Opposition.

Crosbie led the party into the 2019 provincial election with the party increasing its seat count from 7 to 15. The PCs finished 1% behind the Liberals in the popular vote and the Ball government was reduced to a minority. Crosbie was personally re-elected in Windsor Lake.

Crosbie endorsed Peter Mackay in the 2020 Conservative Party of Canada leadership election.

Crosbie led the party into the 2021 provincial election. He was personally defeated in his district of Windsor Lake; while the party lost one other seat, electing 13 MHAs. The Liberals under Furey won a majority government. On March 31, 2021, Crosbie resigned as PC leader.

== Retirement ==
On February 14, 2022, it emerged that Crosbie donated $800 to the protesters in the Freedom Convoy. He endorsed Pierre Poilievre in the 2022 Conservative Party of Canada leadership election. In 2024, he said that climate change caused by humans is "bogus" during a Senate of Canada standing committee on natural resources hearing. In August 2026, Crosbie announced his opposition to the 2026 Churchill Falls Definitive Cooperation and Implementation Agreement (DCIA).

== Election results ==
2021 Newfoundland and Labrador general election: Windsor Lake
Party	Candidate	Votes	%	±%
Liberal	John Hogan	2,688	50.58	+12.12
Progressive Conservative	Ches Crosbie	2,154	40.53	-8.18
New Democratic	Tomás Shea	472	8.88	-3.94
Total valid votes		5,314	99.27	
Total rejected ballots		39	0.73	
Turnout		5,353	56.68	
Eligible voters		9,444		
Liberal gain from Progressive Conservative		Swing		+10.15
Source(s) "Officially Nominated Candidates General Election 2021" (PDF). Elections Newfoundland and Labrador. "NL Election 2021 (Unofficial Results)".

2019 Newfoundland and Labrador general election
Party	Candidate	Votes	%	±%
Progressive Conservative	Ches Crosbie	2,644	48.71	+6.01
Liberal	Bob Osborne	2,088	38.47	+0.34
New Democratic	Tomás Shea	696	12.82	-6.35
Total valid votes		5,428		
Total rejected ballots				
Turnout				
Eligible voters				
Progressive Conservative hold		Swing		+2.83

}

By-election - September 20, 2018 On the resignation of Cathy Bennett, August 21, 2018
Party	Candidate	Votes	%	±%
Progressive Conservative	Ches Crosbie	2,034	42.70	+22.49
Liberal	Paul Antle	1,816	38.13	-28.18
New Democratic	Kerri Claire Neil	913	19.17	+5.69
Total valid votes		4,763		
Progressive Conservative gain from Liberal		Swing		+25.33

2018 Progressive Conservative Party of Newfoundland and Labrador leadership electionPoint allocation by ballot
Candidate	Ballot 1
Name	Points
Ches Crosbie	2,298.92; 57.47%
Tony Wakeham	1,701.08; 42.53%
Total points	4,000.00
