= Len Stirling =

Canadian politician (1937–2024)

Leader of the Opposition in Newfoundland and Labrador
- In office 1982–1984
- Preceded by: Don Jamieson
- Succeeded by: Steve Neary

Member of the Newfoundland and Labrador House of Assembly for Bonavista North
- In office 1979–1982
- Preceded by: W. George Cross
- Succeeded by: W. George Cross

Personal details
- Born: November 3, 1937 Corner Brook, Newfoundland
- Died: February 12, 2024 (aged 86)
- Party: Liberal Party of Newfoundland and Labrador
- Profession: Insurance executive

Leonard Walter Stirling (November 3, 1937 – February 12, 2024) was a Canadian politician in the province of Newfoundland and Labrador. He was a member of the Newfoundland House of Assembly from 1979 to 1982 and was leader of the Liberal Party of Newfoundland and Labrador from 1980 to 1982.

== Private life ==
Stirling was from Corner Brook and worked as an insurance executive in private life. He served as deputy mayor of St. John's before entering provincial politics.

== Party president and assembly member ==
Stirling was president of the Newfoundland and Labrador Liberal Party in the late 1970s and played a pivotal role in persuading Donald Jamieson to lead the party in the 1979 provincial election. The party's sitting leader, Bill Rowe, had been criticized by a majority of caucus members, and the party had scheduled a leadership review before the election was called. Rowe voluntarily stepped aside after Jamieson agreed to lead the party. The Liberals lost the election to Brian Peckford's Progressive Conservative Party, although Stirling was personally elected in the Bonavista North division.

Jamieson resigned as Liberal Party leader after the election, and Stirling won a landslide victory over Leslie Thoms to become his successor in late 1980.

== Party leader ==
Stirling was leader of the provincial Liberal Party at a time when Canadian prime minister Pierre Trudeau and Newfoundland premier Brian Peckford were engaged in a jurisdictional dispute over Newfoundland's offshore mineral resources. Stirling agreed with Peckford that the province should own the resources, although he criticized Peckford's approach in battling the federal government.

In July 1981, Stirling criticized Peckford for using an order-in-council to increase the salary of cabinet members.

Peckford called a snap election for April 1982, making mineral resources the primary election issue. The Liberal campaign focused on employment issues and argued that Peckford's aggressive stance on resources was undermining Newfoundland's negotiating position. Stirling said that he could negotiate a better resource deal with the federal government via a more conciliatory tone and proposed a federal-provincial fund that would allow Newfoundland to purchase failing fishery plants.

Peckford's Progressive Conservatives were re-elected with a landslide majority government in the 1982 election, and Stirling was personally defeated in Bonavista North. He resigned as leader in October 1982.

An essay on the Newfoundland Liberal Party published in 1992 described Stirling as having a "pleasant, conciliatory personality," but lacking in profile and without "zeal for political power."

== After politics ==
Stirling continued his career as an insurance executive. By the 1990s, he was first vice president and Atlantic regional manager of Johnson's Insurance. He was named to the board of governors of Newfoundland and Labrador Hydro in 1999.

Stirling died on February 12, 2024, at the age of 86.

== Electoral record ==
Leadership contests

Candidate	Votes	%
Liberal Party of Newfoundland and Labrador leadership convention
1980
First Ballot
Len Stirling	666	82.53
Les Thoms	140	17.35
Edward Noseworthy	1	0.12
Total valid votes	807	100.00

Source: John Laschinger and Geoffrey Stevens, Leaders & Lesser Mortals: Backroom Politics in Canada, Toronto: Key Porter Books Limited, 1992, p. 258.
