= Humber East =

Former provincial electoral district in Newfoundland and Labrador, Canada

Newfoundland and Labrador electoral district
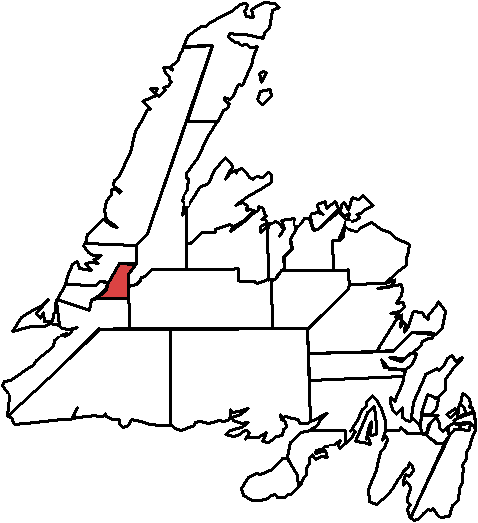
- Humber East in relation to other districts in Newfoundland

Defunct provincial electoral district
- Legislature: Newfoundland and Labrador House of Assembly
- District created: 1966
- First contested: 1966
- Last contested: 2014

Demographics
- Population (2006): 10,153
- Electors (2011): 8,801
- Census division: Division No. 5
- Census subdivision(s): Corner Brook, Division No. 5, Subd. A, Division No. 5, Subd. C, Division No. 5, Subd. F, Massey Drive, Pasadena, Steady Brook

Humber East is a former provincial electoral district for the House of Assembly of Newfoundland and Labrador, Canada.

It includes the eastern section of Corner Brook as well as Humber Village, Little Rapids, Massey Drive, Pasadena, and Steady Brook. There is a mix of urban and rural areas. The district is among the most prosperous in the province.

Humber East has elected a series of political heavyweights, including Clyde Wells, Tom Farrell, Lynn Verge, and former premier Tom Marshall. Humber East was reconfigured into the districts of Corner Brook and Humber-Bay of Islands in 2015.

== Members of the House of Assembly ==
The district has elected the following members of the House of Assembly:

Member	Party	Term
Stelman Flynn	Liberal	2014–2015
Tom Marshall	Progressive Conservative	2003–2014
Bob Mercer	Liberal	1996–2003
Lynn Verge	Progressive Conservative	1979–1996
Tom Farrell	Progressive Conservative	1971–1979
Clyde Wells	Liberal	1966–1971
Noel Murphy	Progressive Conservative	1962–1966
John A. Forsey	Liberal	1956–1962

== Election results ==
Newfoundland and Labrador provincial by-election, 25 November 2014
Party	Candidate	Votes	%	±%
Liberal	Stelman Flynn	2,200	55.43	+46.96
Progressive Conservative	Lary Wells	1,454	36.63	-41.61
New Democratic	Martin Ware	315	7.94	-5.35
Total valid votes		3,969	99.60	
Total rejected ballots		16	0.40	+0.04
Turnout		3,985	49.64	-1.38
Eligible voters		8,027		
Liberal gain from Progressive Conservative		Swing		+44.29

2011 Newfoundland and Labrador general election
Party	Candidate	Votes	%	±%
Progressive Conservative	Tom Marshall	3,493	78.25	-5.74
NDP	Marc Best	593	13.28	+8.12
Liberal	Charles Murphy	378	8.47	-2.37
Total valid votes		4,464	99.64	
Total rejected ballots		16	0.36	-0.24
Turnout		4,480	55.81	-9.16
Eligible voters		8,027		
Progressive Conservative hold		Swing		-6.93

2007 Newfoundland and Labrador general election
Party	Candidate	Votes	%	±%
Progressive Conservative	Tom Marshall	4,160	83.99	+23.75
Liberal	Mike Hoffe	537	10.84	-28.92
NDP	Jean Graham	256	5.17	
Total valid votes		4,953	99.40	
Total rejected ballots		30	0.60	+0.13
Turnout		4,983	64.97	-6.94
Eligible voters		7,670		
Progressive Conservative hold		Swing		+26.33

2003 Newfoundland and Labrador general election
Party	Candidate	Votes	%	±%
Progressive Conservative	Tom Marshall	3,976	60.24	+20.86
Liberal	Bob Mercer	2,624	39.76	-12.59
Total valid votes		6,600	99.53	
Total rejected ballots		31	0.47	+0.17
Turnout		6,631	71.90	-0.04
Eligible voters		9,222		
Progressive Conservative gain from Liberal		Swing		+16.73

1999 Newfoundland general election
Party	Candidate	Votes	%	±%
Liberal	Bob Mercer	3,197	52.35	+2.30
Progressive Conservative	Janice Wells	2,405	39.38	-10.57
Independent	David B. LeDrew	259	4.24	
NDP	Jean Mehaney	246	4.03	
Total valid votes		6,107	99.71	
Total rejected ballots		18	0.29	-0.22
Turnout		6,125	71.94	-8.82
Eligible voters		8,514		
Liberal hold		Swing		+6.43

1996 Newfoundland general election
Party	Candidate	Votes	%	±%
Liberal	Bob Mercer	3,424	50.05	+5.79
Progressive Conservative	Lynn Verge	3,417	49.95	-3.15
Total valid votes		6,841	99.49	
Total rejected ballots		35	0.51	+0.24
Turnout		6,878	80.76	-3.92
Eligible voters		8,514		
Liberal gain from Progressive Conservative		Swing		+4.47

1993 Newfoundland general election
Party	Candidate	Votes	%	±%
Progressive Conservative	Lynn Verge	3,696	53.10	+3.00
Liberal	Priscilla Boutcher	3,081	44.26	-3.88
New Democratic	Maureen Mills	184	2.64	+0.88
Total valid votes		6,961	99.73	
Total rejected ballots		19	0.27	+0.08
Turnout		6,980	84.68	-4.08
Eligible voters		8,243		
Progressive Conservative hold		Swing		+3.44

1989 Newfoundland general election
Party	Candidate	Votes	%	±%
Progressive Conservative	Lynn Verge	3,658	50.10	+5.47
Liberal	Clyde Wells	3,515	48.14	+7.81
New Democratic	Jim McManamy	129	1.77	-13.28
Total valid votes		7,302	99.81	
Total rejected ballots		14	0.19	+0.06
Turnout		7,316	88.75	+10.88
Eligible voters		8,243		
Progressive Conservative hold		Swing		-1.17

1985 Newfoundland general election
Party	Candidate	Votes	%	±%
Progressive Conservative	Lynn Verge	2,955	44.63	-22.19
Liberal	Keith Payne	2,670	40.33	+13.42
New Democratic	Stuart Fraser	996	15.04	+8.77
Total valid votes		6,621	99.86	
Total rejected ballots		9	0.14	-0.01
Turnout		6,630	77.87	+0.91
Eligible voters		8,514		
Progressive Conservative hold		Swing		-17.81

1982 Newfoundland general election
Party	Candidate	Votes	%	±%
Progressive Conservative	Lynn Verge	3,102	66.82	+8.41
Liberal	Paul Dicks	1,249	26.91	-3.53
New Democratic	Cynthia Wishart	291	6.27	-4.88
Total valid votes		4,642	99.81	
Total rejected ballots		7	0.15	-0.11
Turnout		4,649	76.96	+6.24
Eligible voters		6,041		
Progressive Conservative hold		Swing		+5.97

== Boundaries ==
The District of Humber East is located on the West Coast of Newfoundland, it takes in a portion of the City of Corner Brook, the towns of Massey Drive, Steady Brook, Humber Village, Little Rapids, and Pasadena. Its boundaries are as follows:

- Begins at the intersection of the Meridian of 57° 30′ West Longitude and the southern shoreline of Deer Lake;
- Then running in a general southwesterly direction along the sinuosities of the southern shoreline of Deer Lake to its intersection with the centre line of Blue Gulch Brook;
- Then running in a general southeasterly direction along the centre line of Blue Gulch Brook to its intersection with the centre line of Main Street, Pasadena;
- Then running in a general southwesterly direction along the centre line of Main Street to its intersection with the centre line of South Brook;
- Then running in a general southeasterly direction along the centre line of South Brook to its

intersection with the Parallel of 49° North Latitude;

- Then running due south to the point of intersection with the southern shoreline of Grand Lake;
- Then running due west to its intersection with the centre line of the Trans Canada Highway;
- Then running in a general northeasterly direction along the centre line of the Trans Canada

Highway to its intersection with the centre line of Lewin Parkway;

- Then running in a general northwesterly direction along the centre line of Lewin Parkway to its intersection with the centre line of Wheeler's Road;
- Then running in a general northwesterly direction along the centre line of Wheeler's Road to its intersection with the centre line of Pratt Street;
- Then running in a general southwesterly direction along the centre line of Pratt Street to its

intersection with the centre line of Carter Avenue;

- Then running in a general northwesterly direction along the centre line of Carter Avenue to its

intersection with the centre line of Elizabeth Street;

- Then running in a general northwesterly direction along the centre line of Elizabeth Street to its intersection with the centre line of Churchill Street;
- Then running in a general northeasterly direction along the centre line of Churchill Street to its

intersection with the centre line of O’Connell Drive;

- Then running in a general easterly direction along the centre line of O’Connell Drive to its

intersection with the centre line of Corner Brook Stream;

- Then running in a general northwesterly direction along the centre line of Corner Brook Stream to its intersection with the southern shoreline of Humber Arm;
- Then running in a general northeasterly direction along the sinuosities of Humber Arm and Humber River to the intersection with the centre line of the Bay of Islands North Shore Highway, Route #440;
- Then running in a northeasterly direction to the summit of Old Man Mountain, north of Old Mans Pond;
- Then running in an easterly direction to the point of beginning.

== See also ==
- List of Newfoundland and Labrador provincial electoral districts
- Canadian provincial electoral districts

Newfoundland and Labrador House of Assembly
Preceded by Virginia Waters	Constituency represented by the premier of Newfoundland and Labrador; 2014	Succeeded by Topsail
