= Dianne Whalen =

Canadian politician

Member of the Newfoundland and Labrador House of Assembly
- In office 2003 – October 3, 2010
- Preceded by: Jim Walsh
- Succeeded by: David Brazil
- Constituency: Conception Bay East - Bell Island

Provincial Minister of Municipal & Provincial Affairs, Minister Responsible for Emergency Prepardness, And Registrar General
- In office 2008 – October 3, 2010
- Preceded by: Dave Denine
- Succeeded by: Kevin O'Brien

Provincial Minister of Transportation and Works
- In office 2007–2008
- Preceded by: John Hickey
- Succeeded by: Trevor Taylor

Provincial Minister of Government Services And Lands, And Minister Responsible for the Government Purchasing Agency, And Minister Responsible for the strategic Social Media
- In office 2003–2007
- Succeeded by: Kevin O'Brien

Mayor of Paradise, Newfoundland and Labrador
- In office 1985–2003
- Preceded by: Bill Lewis
- Succeeded by: Fred Brown

Personal details
- Born: May 3, 1951 Come By Chance, Newfoundland and Labrador
- Died: October 3, 2010 (aged 59) St. John’s, Newfoundland and Labrador
- Party: Progressive Conservative Party
- Website: Dianne Whalen

Dianne Carolynn Whalen (May 3, 1951 – October 3, 2010) was a Canadian politician and provincial Cabinet Minister in Newfoundland and Labrador.

== Early life ==
Whalen was born in Come By Chance, Newfoundland and Labrador, raised in Port Blandford and lived for 40 years in Paradise where she served as mayor for 18 years.

== Political career ==
Whalen was one of several star candidates that helped bring the Progressive Conservatives back to power in 2003 after 14 years in opposition. She was elected to represent the district of Conception Bay East and Bell Island in the Newfoundland and Labrador House of Assembly. Whalen was re-elected in 2007 and served as MHA and Minister until her death in 2010. Whalen was appointed to Danny Williams' first Cabinet in 2003 as the Minister of Government Services. She remained in the Government Services portfolio till 2007 when she was appointed Minister of Transportation and Works. On October 31, 2008, she became Minister of Municipal Affairs, Minister Responsible for Emergency Preparedness, and as Registrar General.

In the fall of 2009 Whalen went off on sick leave after being hospitalized as a result of illness. With the re-opening of the House of Assembly in March 2010 Whalen resumed her duties as MHA and Minister. On October 3, 2010, Premier Williams announced that Whalen had died following a fight with cancer.
