= Red Island, Newfoundland and Labrador =

Coordinates: 47°23′N 54°10′W

Red Island is a former village about 12 miles northwest of Placentia, Newfoundland and Labrador, Canada in Placentia Bay, on an island of the same name. It had five families in 1864, and had a population of approximately 350 in the 1945 census.^{1} The village of 283 was depopulated in October 1968, during the provincial government's Resettlement Program. In modern times, many people have cabins there and use it as a summer retreat. It recorded a 1986 population of 1, during an attempt to repopulate the island. This failed, however, when no teacher could be found for the proposed re-opened school.

Location of Red Island in Newfoundland and Labrador
