= Tony Wakeham =

Premier of Newfoundland and Labrador since 2025

The Honourable Tony Wakeham ECNL MHA
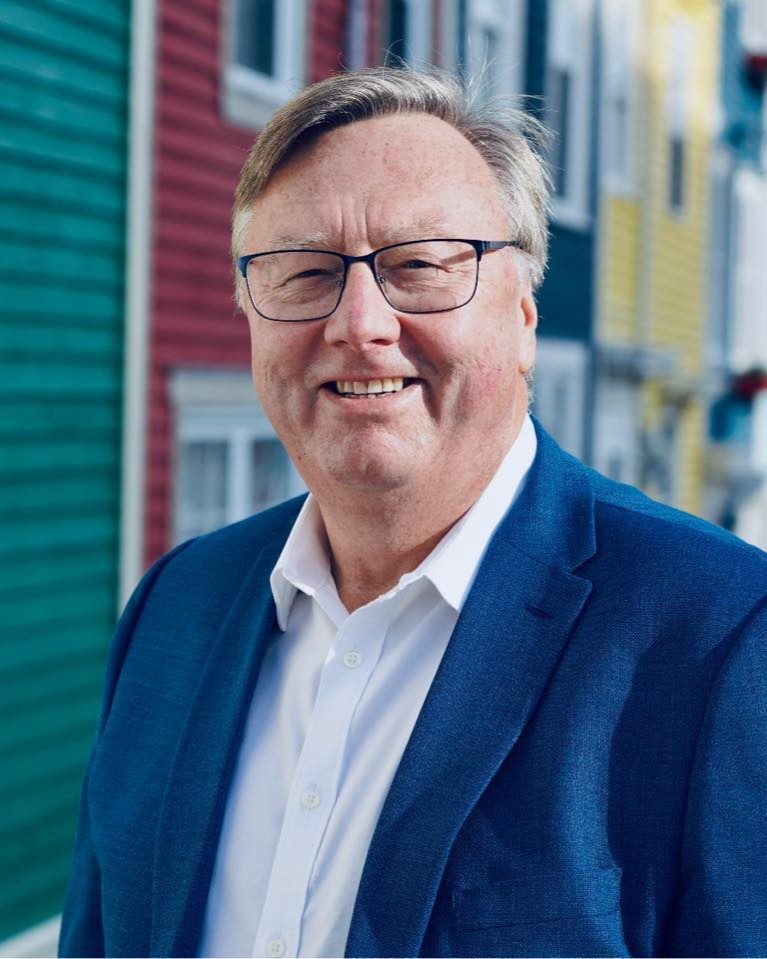
- Wakeham in 2022

16th Premier of Newfoundland and Labrador
- Incumbent
- Assumed office October 29, 2025
- Monarch: Charles III
- Lieutenant Governor: Joan Marie Aylward
- Deputy: Barry Petten
- Preceded by: John Hogan

Leader of the Progressive Conservative Party of Newfoundland and Labrador
- Incumbent
- Assumed office October 14, 2023
- Preceded by: David Brazil (interim)

Leader of the Opposition in Newfoundland and Labrador
- In office October 14, 2023 – October 29, 2025
- Preceded by: David Brazil
- Succeeded by: John Hogan

Member of the Newfoundland and Labrador House of Assembly for Stephenville-Port au Port
- Incumbent
- Assumed office May 16, 2019
- Preceded by: John Finn

Personal details
- Born: July 16, 1956 (age 70) Placentia, Newfoundland, Canada
- Party: Progressive Conservative
- Spouse: Patricia Wakeham
- Children: 2
- Education: Memorial University of Newfoundland
- Occupation: Politician; businessman; public servant
- Website: www.tonywakeham.ca

Tony Wakeham (born July 16, 1956) is a Canadian politician and businessman who has served as the 16th premier of Newfoundland and Labrador since 2025. He has represented Stephenville-Port au Port in the Newfoundland and Labrador House of Assembly since 2019, and has served as the leader of the Newfoundland and Labrador Progressive Conservative Party since 2023.

== Life and early career ==
Tony Wakeham was born on July 16, 1956, in Placentia, Newfoundland and Labrador, to James and Mary Wakeham. His father worked at Naval Station Argentia and his mother was a teacher. After attending Laval High School in Placentia, Wakeham graduated from Memorial University of Newfoundland with a Bachelor of Arts in 1979. He played basketball during his time at Memorial. Wakeham is married to his wife, Patricia, and has 2 children.

Prior to entering politics, Wakeham was the CEO of Labrador-Grenfell Health Authority, was a franchisee of many KFC restaurants and has served as the president of both the Newfoundland and Labrador Basketball Association and Basketball Canada. He has also worked as a public servant in the provincial government.

Wakeham coached several basketball teams, including two of the Newfoundland and Labrador men's teams at the Canada Winter Games; one of them received the province's best finish up to that point.

== Political career ==
In 2018, Wakeham ran for the leadership of the Progressive Conservative Party of Newfoundland and Labrador, but was defeated by St. John's lawyer Ches Crosbie. The final tally was Crosbie with 2,298.92 and Wakeham with 1,701.08 points respectively. Wakeham was subsequently elected in the 2019 provincial election.

On January 17, 2023, Wakeham announced he would be a candidate in the 2023 provincial PC leadership election. He won the election on October 14, 2023 and became Leader of the Opposition.

=== Premier (2025–present) ===
Wakeham led his party to a majority government in the 2025 Newfoundland and Labrador general election, in a major political upset. He was re-elected in his own seat of Stephenville-Port au Port, and will be the first Progressive Conservative premier of the province since 2015. Primarily campaigning on affordability and healthcare, Wakeham promised to conduct an independent review and a referendum on the Churchill Falls memorandum of understanding. He formed the Wakeham ministry on October 29, 2025, following his swearing-in.

On March 3, 2026, the Government of Newfoundland and Labrador announced that it had reached a major agreement with Equinor and BP to advance the Bay du Nord offshore oil development project. The agreement addressed three key areas: life-of-field benefits, royalties, and a provincial equity option.

==== Churchill Falls Memorandum of Understanding (MOU) ====
On December 12, 2024, Churchill Falls negotiations culminated in the signing of a historic Memorandum of Understanding by Newfoundland and Labrador Hydro, Hydro-Québec, and CFLCo. The agreement was publicly announced by Premier Andrew Furey and Québec Premier François Legault as a transformative new partnership intended to replace the 1969 contract seventeen years before its expiry. Following the announcement, a special session of the House of Assembly was held in January 2025 to examine the MOU in detail. On January 9, 2025, the House voted in favour of continuing negotiations toward definitive agreements with Hydro-Québec. The motion passed with support from Liberal, New Democratic Party, and Independent members, while Progressive Conservative members left the chamber before the vote, arguing that a more independent review was required before further commitments were made.

The direction of the project changed significantly following the 2025 provincial election, which brought Wakeham's PCs to power. The new government had campaigned on concerns regarding the MOU and promised a more rigorous assessment before approving any final agreements. On December 15, 2025, Wakeham established the Churchill River Independent Review Committee (IRC), chaired by Chris Huskilson and including Guy Holburn and Michael Wilson. The committee was tasked with determining whether the MOU was in the best long-term interests of Newfoundland and Labrador and was empowered to conduct a comprehensive examination of both the content of the agreement and the negotiation process that produced it.

The IRC delivered its final report on April 30, 2026, and its conclusions profoundly reshaped the public conversation. Although the committee recognized substantial financial and economic benefits associated with the MOU, it concluded that the agreement "in its current form is not in the public interest." The committee identified a number of concerns, including limited long-term access to Churchill Falls power for Newfoundland and Labrador after 2041, lack of guaranteed transmission access through Québec to reach external markets, problematic pricing structures, governance arrangements that continued to provide significant influence to Hydro-Québec, and risks associated with the proposed Gull Island ownership model. The committee estimated that the real net present value of the agreement was approximately $31 billion rather than the nominal $227 billion frequently highlighted by government communications. Nevertheless, the IRC acknowledged that the proposed agreement could generate meaningful benefits if significant improvements were made.

Following release of the report, Premier Wakeham stated that the province would not abandon development of Churchill Falls and Gull Island but would instead seek material improvements through renewed negotiations. A new negotiating team consisting of Barry Perry, Jerome Kennedy, and Jennifer Williams was appointed, and discussions resumed with Hydro-Québec during the summer of 2026. One of the most significant issues identified by the IRC was Newfoundland and Labrador's inability under the original MOU to secure guaranteed transmission rights through Hydro-Québec's network to external markets. During meetings between Premier Wakeham and Québec Premier Christine Fréchette, negotiators focused heavily on addressing this deficiency.

By August 2026, reports emerged that a revised agreement was close to completion. According to sources familiar with negotiations, the proposed replacement for the 2024 MOU would include guaranteed transmission access of approximately 985 MW through Hydro-Québec's network, enabling Newfoundland and Labrador to market electricity directly into other jurisdictions. Former deputy minister Ron Penney described the provision as a significant departure from the original MOU because the earlier agreement had not secured guaranteed access to Québec's transmission system. This development directly addressed one of the most important concerns raised by the Independent Review Committee and reflected the evolving effort to ensure that Newfoundland and Labrador could maximize the long-term value of Churchill River resources while avoiding some of the limitations that had characterized both the 1969 contract and aspects of the original 2024 MOU.

==== August 17, 2026 DCIA Deal ====
On August 17, 2026, Newfoundland and Labrador, Quebec, and the Government of Canada announced a substantially revised agreement concerning the Churchill River system. The three parties signed a Definitive Cooperation and Implementation Agreement (DCIA). At a public event in St. John's, Prime Minister Mark Carney, Premier Tony Wakeham, and Premier Christine Fréchette unveiled what Carney described as one of the largest clean-energy investments in North American history. The package combined hydroelectric upgrades, transmission infrastructure, mining-related investments, and a major proposed wind-energy project in Labrador. Together, these initiatives were projected to deliver approximately 14,000 MW of renewable electricity, support more than 20,000 construction jobs, and significantly expand eastern Canada's energy infrastructure.

A key feature of the new arrangement was the reworking of the economic benefits available to Newfoundland and Labrador. The province's share of the agreement was estimated at $49 billion in 2026 net present value, representing an increase of approximately $13 billion over the 2024 Memorandum of Understanding. In nominal terms, the package was valued at approximately $273 billion. Newfoundland and Labrador was also projected to receive roughly $10 billion in earlier cash flows prior to 2041, improving the province's financial position before the expiry of the original Churchill Falls contract.

The power-sharing provisions were also significantly revised. Newfoundland and Labrador secured access to up to 2,350 MW of hydroelectric generation from Churchill Falls and Gull Island, compared with 1,990 MW under the 2024 MOU. In addition, a proposed 2,000 MW Labrador wind project could provide the province with a further 400 MW of electricity, bringing the total increase to approximately 760 MW more power than contemplated under the earlier agreement. Newfoundland and Labrador retained the flexibility to use this electricity for domestic industrial development or sell surplus power externally. Hydro-Québec agreed to purchase unused provincial allocations at premium pricing, reported as 150 percent above base PPA pricing.

Another major breakthrough involved transmission rights. Unlike the 2024 MOU, the revised agreement guarantees Newfoundland and Labrador access to use Quebec's transmission network to reach external markets. The province secured a transmission portfolio totaling 985 MW, including up to 240 MW through the Champlain Hudson Power Express (CHPE) into New York and 200 MW through the New England Clean Energy Connect (NECEC) into New England. Additional capacity includes synthetic export arrangements and direct transmission opportunities. For the first time, Newfoundland and Labrador gained the independent ability to export significant volumes of electricity through Quebec to U.S. markets without requiring Hydro-Québec approval for those sales decisions.

The development plan itself underwent important changes. The previously contemplated Churchill Falls Expansion (CFX) project was removed from the commercial agreement. While a feasibility study will continue to examine future expansion possibilities, no binding commercial arrangements were established for that component. Instead, attention shifted toward upgrading the existing Churchill Falls facility, increasing its generating capacity by approximately 1,275 MW, and expanding the proposed Gull Island project to roughly 2,700 MW, substantially larger than originally envisioned in the 2024 MOU.

Federal participation became a defining element of the agreement. The federal government committed approximately $10 billion in financing support for Churchill Falls upgrades, Gull Island development, transmission infrastructure, and the Labrador wind project. Newfoundland and Labrador's share of direct federal support was estimated at approximately $3.5 billion in 2026 net present value, including investments in Labrador West transmission infrastructure, wind-energy development support, loan guarantees, and additional financing measures intended to reduce project costs and risk.

The agreement also aimed to support Labrador's mining sector. The federal government announced that projects associated with the Labrador Trough, described as a world-class iron ore and critical minerals region, would receive support through federal development initiatives and the Major Projects Office. Proposed investments include a transmission line to mining developments in Labrador West, planning and feasibility work for the Kami Iron Ore Project, pre-construction work related to the Lac Knife project, and expansion of critical-minerals handling infrastructure at SFP Pointe-Noire. The objective is to leverage expanded electricity infrastructure to stimulate mining and industrial growth throughout the region.

Employment and Indigenous participation were central elements of the agreement. The agreement guarantees that 85 percent of all person-hours associated with Gull Island construction will remain within Newfoundland and Labrador, with priority given first to qualified Labrador Innu workers, followed by Labrador residents and Newfoundlanders. Governments estimated that as many as 5,000 workers could be employed at Gull Island during peak construction, while the broader package of developments could support more than 20,000 jobs overall. Newfoundland and Labrador and Canada also identified opportunities for Labrador Innu participation in future transmission and wind-energy assets.

For residents of Newfoundland and Labrador, the provincial government linked the agreement to direct consumer benefits. Once finalized, a 15 percent "Churchill River Electricity Rebate" is expected to apply to the first 2,000 kWh of electricity consumed each month. The government estimates that this measure would save the average household approximately $351 per year.

Despite the announcement, the agreement remains non-binding, with definitive agreements expected before the end of 2026. The current arrangement allows parties to withdraw before final execution. Opposition Liberals questioned several aspects of the revised deal, including the relative allocation of additional power between Newfoundland and Labrador and Quebec and the absence of withdrawal penalties. Premier Wakeham also abandoned his earlier commitment to hold a referendum, announcing instead that a special session of the House of Assembly would begin on September 14, 2026 to allow elected representatives to review and debate the agreement publicly.

On September 17, 2026, the House of Assembly voted 21-18 to approve the Definitive Cooperation and Implementation Agreement (DCIA) with the PC caucus and Independent MHA Eddie Joyce voting in favour and the Liberal and NDP caucuses voting against, along with Independent MHA Keith Russell.

== Electoral history ==
=== Leadership elections ===
2023 Progressive Conservative Party of Newfoundland and Labrador leadership election

Point allocation by ballot
Candidate	Ballot 1	Ballot 2
Name	Votes	Votes
Tony Wakeham	1,816; 45.4%	2,091; 52.0%
Eugene Manning	1,636; 40.9%	1,909; 48.0%
Lloyd Parrott	548; 13.7%	Eliminated
Total Points	4,000.00	4,000.00

2018 Progressive Conservative Party of Newfoundland and Labrador leadership electionPoint allocation by ballot
Candidate	Ballot 1
Name	Points
Ches Crosbie	2,298.92; 57.47%
Tony Wakeham	1,701.08; 42.53%
Total points	4,000.00

=== Provincial elections ===
2025 Newfoundland and Labrador general election: Stephenville-Port au Port
Party	Candidate	Votes	%	±%
Progressive Conservative	Tony Wakeham	3,820	76.29	+16.63
Liberal	Jeff Young	1,044	20.85	-17.00
New Democratic	Susan Jarvis	143	2.86	+0.38
Total valid votes		5,007		
Total rejected ballots				
Turnout				
Eligible voters				
Progressive Conservative hold		Swing		+16.81

2021 Newfoundland and Labrador general election: Stephenville-Port au Port
Party	Candidate	Votes	%	±%
Progressive Conservative	Tony Wakeham	2,481	59.67	+9.36
Liberal	Kevin Aylward	1,574	37.85	-11.83
New Democratic	Jamie Ruby	103	2.48	
Total valid votes		4,158	99.59	
Total rejected ballots		17	0.41	
Turnout		4,175	43.41	
Eligible voters		9,618		
Progressive Conservative hold		Swing		+10.60
Source(s) "Officially Nominated Candidates General Election 2021" (PDF). Elections Newfoundland and Labrador. "NL Election 2021 (Unofficial Results)".

2019 Newfoundland and Labrador general election
Party	Candidate	Votes	%	±%
Progressive Conservative	Tony Wakeham	2,512	50.3	+25.0
Liberal	John Finn	2,481	49.7	-15.1
Total valid votes				
Total rejected ballots				
Turnout				
Eligible voters				
