= Conception Bay East–Bell Island =

Provincial electoral district in Newfoundland and Labrador, Canada

Conception Bay East – Bell Island
Newfoundland and Labrador electoral district
- Location in St. John's

Provincial electoral district
- Legislature: Newfoundland and Labrador House of Assembly
MHA
Fred Hutton
Liberal
- District created: 1985
- First contested: 1985
- Last contested: 2025

Demographics
- Population (2011): 14,885
- Electors (2024): 12,682
- Area (km²): 100
- Census division: Division No. 1
- Census subdivision(s): Paradise, Portugal Cove–St. Philip's, Wabana, Division No. 1, Subd. R

Conception Bay East–Bell Island is a provincial electoral district for the House of Assembly of Newfoundland and Labrador, Canada. In 2011 there were 11,011 eligible voters living within the district.

Primarily an exurban district within the St. John's Metropolitan Area, the district includes Bell Island (which is linked by a ferry service to the rest of the district), the town of Portugal Cove–St. Philip's, the St. Thomas part of the town of Paradise, and the watershed area along Thorburn Road. The district was considered fairly safe for the Progressive Conservative Party until Liberal Fred Hutton won a by-election on January 30, 2024.

The riding was created in 1985 as Mount Scio-Bell Island out of parts of Harbour Main-Bell Island, St. John's East Extern, Mount Scio, Conception Bay South and a small part of Mount Pearl.

Bell Island had its own electoral district from 1956 to 1975 when it became part of Harbour Main-Bell Island. It was part of Harbour Main-Bell Island prior to 1956 as well.

== Members of the House of Assembly ==
The district has elected the following members of the House of Assembly:

Assembly	Years	Member	Party
Bell Island
31st	1956–1959	Joseph O'Driscoll	Liberal
32nd	1959–1962	Richard J. Greene	Progressive Conservative
33rd	1963–1966	Stephen A. Neary	Liberal
34th	1966–1971	Stephen A. Neary	Liberal
35th	1971–1972	Stephen A. Neary	Liberal
36th	1972–1975	Stephen A. Neary	Liberal
Riding dissolved into Harbour Main-Bell Island.
Mount Scio-Bell Island; Riding created from Conception Bay South, Harbour Main-Bell Island, Mount Pearl, Mount Scio, and St. John's East Extern.
40th	1985–1989	Leo Barry	Liberal
41st	1989–1993	Jim Walsh	Liberal
42nd	1993–1996	Jim Walsh	Liberal
Conception Bay East–Bell Island
43rd	1996–1999	Jim Walsh	Liberal
44th	1999–2003	Jim Walsh	Liberal
45th	2003–2007	Dianne Whalen	Progressive Conservative
46th	2007–2010	Dianne Whalen	Progressive Conservative
46th	2010–2011	David Brazil	Progressive Conservative
47th	2011–2015	David Brazil	Progressive Conservative
48th	2015–2019	David Brazil	Progressive Conservative
49th	2019–2021	David Brazil	Progressive Conservative
50th	2021–2023	David Brazil	Progressive Conservative
50th	2024–2025	Fred Hutton	Liberal
51st	2025–present	Fred Hutton	Liberal

== Election results ==
Graph of election results (minor parties that never got 2% of the vote or did not run consistently are omitted) View source data.

=== Conception Bay East–Bell Island ===
2025 Newfoundland and Labrador general election
Party	Candidate	Votes	%	±%
Liberal	Fred Hutton	3,730	57.23	+11.33
Progressive Conservative	Tina Neary	2,285	35.06	-2.89
New Democratic	Henry House	503	7.72	-7.20
Total valid votes		6,518		
Total rejected ballots				
Turnout				
Eligible voters				
Liberal hold		Swing		+7.11

Newfoundland and Labrador provincial by-election, January 30, 2024 Resignation of David Brazil
Party	Candidate	Votes	%	±%
Liberal	Fred Hutton	2,603	45.90	+12.82
Progressive Conservative	Tina Neary	2,152	37.95	-18.24
New Democratic	Kim Churchill	846	14.92	+4.19
Independent	Darryl Harding	70	1.23	
Total valid votes		5,671	99.65	
Total rejected ballots		20	0.35	-0.96
Turnout		5,691	44.82	-5.30
Eligible voters		12,698		
Liberal gain from Progressive Conservative		Swing		+15.53

2021 Newfoundland and Labrador general election
Party	Candidate	Votes	%	±%
Progressive Conservative	David Brazil	3,215	56.19	–17.60
Liberal	Lynn Hammond	1,893	33.08	+6.87
New Democratic	Gavin Will	614	10.73	
Total valid votes		5,722	98.69	
Total rejected ballots		76	1.31	–0.50
Turnout		5,798	50.12	–5.44
Eligible voters		11,569		
Progressive Conservative hold		Swing		–12.23
Source(s) "Officially Nominated Candidates General Election 2021" (PDF). Elections Newfoundland and Labrador. "2021 Provincial General Election Report" (PDF).

2019 Newfoundland and Labrador general election
Party	Candidate	Votes	%	±%
Progressive Conservative	David Brazil	4,365	73.78	+14.57
Liberal	Cyril Hayden	1,551	26.22	-0.83
Total valid votes		5,916	98.19	
Total rejected ballots		109	1.81	+1.50
Turnout		6,025	55.56	+0.43
Eligible voters		10,844		
Progressive Conservative hold		Swing		+7.70

2015 Newfoundland and Labrador general election
Party	Candidate	Votes	%	±%
Progressive Conservative	David Brazil	3,463	59.22	+4.22
Liberal	Danny Dumaresque	1,582	27.05	+23.22
New Democratic	Bill Kavanagh	803	13.73	-27.44
Total valid votes		5,848	99.69	
Total rejected ballots		18	0.31	+0.15
Turnout		5,866	55.13	+5.50
Eligible voters		10,641		
Progressive Conservative hold		Swing		-9.50

2011 Newfoundland and Labrador general election
Party	Candidate	Votes	%	±%
Progressive Conservative	David Brazil	3,059	55.00	-11.30
New Democratic	Bill Kavanagh	2,290	41.17	+14.98
Liberal	Kim Ploughman	213	3.83	-3.68
Total valid votes		5,562	99.84	
Total rejected ballots		9	0.16	-0.04
Turnout		5,571	49.63	+13.61
Eligible voters		11,225		
Progressive Conservative hold		Swing		-13.14

Newfoundland and Labrador provincial by-election, December 2, 2010 On the death of Dianne Whalen, October 3, 2010
Party	Candidate	Votes	%	±%}
Progressive Conservative	David Brazil	2,640	66.30	-5.50
New Democratic	George Murphy	1,043	26.19	+15.96
Liberal	Joy Buckle	299	7.51	-10.46
Total valid votes		3,982	99.80	
Total rejected ballots		8	0.20	-0.14
Turnout		3,990	36.02	-23.68
Eligible voters		11,078		
Progressive Conservative hold		Swing		-10.73

2007 Newfoundland and Labrador general election
Party	Candidate	Votes	%	±%
Progressive Conservative	Dianne Whalen	3,991	71.79	+15.51
Liberal	Linda Goodyear	999	17.97	-7.41
New Democratic	Gavin Will	569	10.24	-5.78
Total valid votes		5,559	99.66	
Total rejected ballots		19	0.34	+0.03
Turnout		5,578	59.70	-18.01
Eligible voters		9,344		
Progressive Conservative hold		Swing		+11.46

2003 Newfoundland and Labrador general election
Party	Candidate	Votes	%	±%
Progressive Conservative	Dianne Whalen	4,147	56.28	+26.42
Liberal	Jim Walsh	1,870	25.38	-14.81
New Democratic	Ken Kavanagh	1,180	16.02	+0.58
Non-Affiliated	Doug Cole	171	2.32	
Total valid votes		7,368	99.69	
Total rejected ballots		23	0.31	+0.16
Turnout		7,391	77.71	+3.71
Eligible voters		9,511		
Progressive Conservative gain from Liberal		Swing		+20.61

1999 Newfoundland general election
Party	Candidate	Votes	%	±%
Liberal	Jim Walsh	2,426	40.19	-8.21
Progressive Conservative	Doug Cole	1,803	29.87	-7.07
New Democratic	Ken Kavanagh	932	15.44	+10.18
Newfoundland and Labrador First	Sue Kelland-Dyer	876	14.51	
Total valid votes		6,037	99.85	
Total rejected ballots		9	0.15	-0.05
Turnout		6,046	74.00	+0.28
Eligible voters		8,170		
Liberal hold		Swing		-0.57

1996 Newfoundland general election
Party	Candidate	Votes	%	±%
Liberal	Jim Walsh	2,909	48.39	-2.49
Progressive Conservative	Doug Cole	2,220	36.93	-2.49
Independent	Ken Kavanagh	566	9.42	
New Democratic	David Sullivan	316	5.26	-4.05
Total valid votes		6,011	99.80	
Total rejected ballots		12	0.20	-0.08
Turnout		6,023	73.72	-13.86
Eligible voters		8,170		
Liberal hold		Swing		+0.19

=== Mount Scio-Bell Island ===
1993 Newfoundland general election
Party	Candidate	Votes	%	±%
Liberal	Jim Walsh	4,183	50.89	+6.15
Progressive Conservative	Larry O'Keefe	3,272	39.81	-4.42
New Democratic	Valerie Stafford	765	9.41	+3.26
Total valid votes		8,220	99.72	
Total rejected ballots		23	0.28	-0.05
Turnout		8,243	87.58	+12.69
Eligible voters		9,412		
Liberal hold		Swing		+5.29

1989 Newfoundland general election
Party	Candidate	Votes	%	±%
Liberal	Jim Walsh	3,143	44.73	-3.93
Progressive Conservative	Myrle Vokey	3,107	44.22	+2.03
New Democratic	Kevin Walsh	425	6.05	-3.10
Independent	Josiah Harvey	351	5.00	
Total valid votes		7,026	99.67	
Total rejected ballots		23	0.33	-0.14
Turnout		7,049	74.89	-8.90
Eligible voters		9,412		
Liberal hold		Swing		-2.98

1985 Newfoundland general election
Party	Candidate	Votes	%
Liberal	Leo Barry	3,321	48.67
Progressive Conservative	James Patrick Hearn	2,879	42.19
New Democratic	Gerald Panting	624	9.14
Total valid votes		6,824	99.53
Total rejected ballots		32	0.47
Turnout		6,856	83.79
Eligible voters		8,182	

=== Bell Island ===
1972 Newfoundland general election
Party	Candidate	Votes	%	±%
Liberal	Steve Neary	1,175	51.02	-14.63
Progressive Conservative	Bern Fitzpatrick	973	42.25	+7.90
Independent	Edward J. Russell	155	6.73	
Total valid votes		2,303	99.96	
Total rejected ballots		1	0.04	-1.03
Turnout		2,304	84.24	-3.99
Eligible voters		2,735		
Liberal hold		Swing		-11.26

1971 Newfoundland general election
Party	Candidate	Votes	%	±%
Liberal	Steve Neary	1,567	65.65	-9.90
Progressive Conservative	Bern Fitzpatrick	820	34.35	+16.21
Total valid votes		2,387	98.92	
Total rejected ballots		26	1.08	+0.57
Turnout		2,413	88.23	+31.14
Eligible voters		2,735		
Liberal hold		Swing		-13.05

1966 Newfoundland general election
Party	Candidate	Votes	%	±%
Liberal	Stephen Neary	1,761	75.55	+21.17
Progressive Conservative	Herbert Buckingham	423	18.15	-27.48
Independent	Joseph Gendreau	147	6.31	
Total valid votes		2,331	99.49	
Total rejected ballots		12	0.51	-0.17
Turnout		2,343	57.09	-14.03
Eligible voters		4,104		
Liberal hold		Swing		+24.32

1962 Newfoundland general election
Party	Candidate	Votes	%	±%
Liberal	Steve Neary	1,814	54.38	+14.55
Progressive Conservative	Richard Greene	1,522	45.62	-1.27
Total valid votes		3,336	99.32	
Total rejected ballots		23	0.68	+0.03
Turnout		3,359	71.12	-3.01
Eligible voters		4,723		
Liberal gain from Progressive Conservative		Swing		+7.91

== See also ==
- List of Newfoundland and Labrador provincial electoral districts
- Canadian provincial electoral districts
