= 2003 Newfoundland and Labrador general election =

Canadian provincial election

- October 21, 2003

48 seats of the Newfoundland and Labrador House of Assembly 25 seats were needed for a majority
- Turnout: 72.5% (▲2.9 pp)
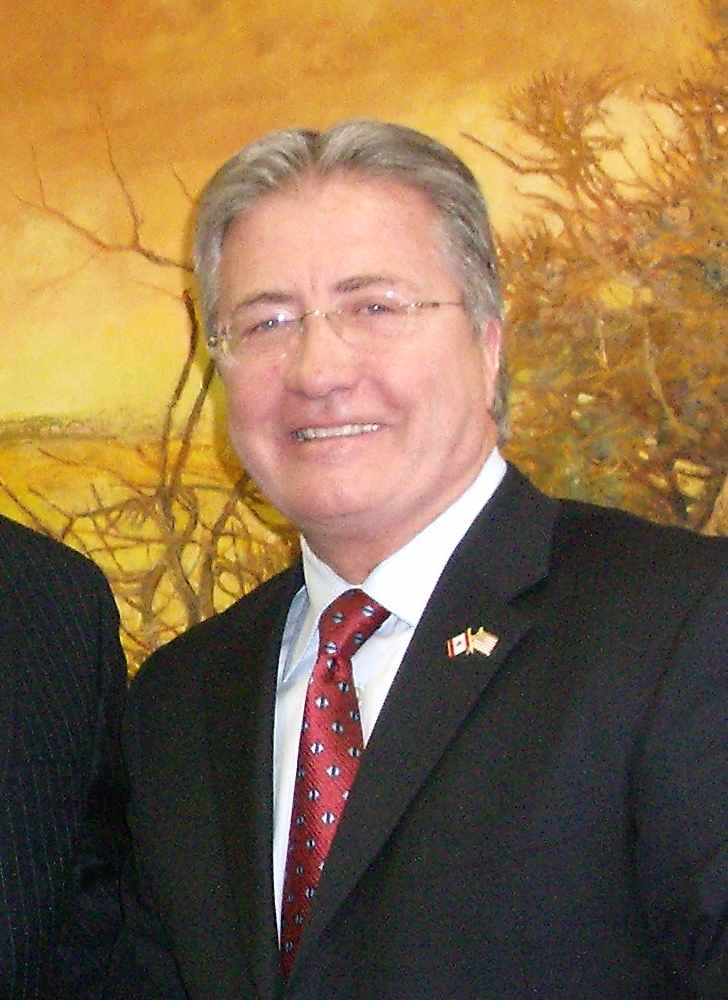

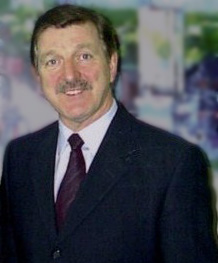

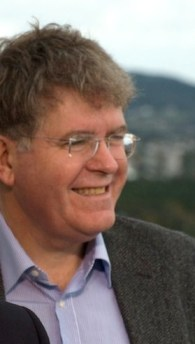
	First party	Second party	Third party
Leader	Danny Williams	Roger Grimes	Jack Harris
Party	Progressive Conservative	Liberal	New Democratic
Leader since	2001	2001	1992
Leader's seat	Humber West	Exploits	Signal Hill-Quidi Vidi
Last election	14	32	2
Seats won	34	12	2
Seat change	▲20	▼20	0
Popular vote	162,949	91,729	19,048
Percentage	58.71%	33.05%	6.86%
Swing	▲17.94%	▼16.57%	▼1.37%
- Popular vote by riding. As this is an FPTP election, seat totals are not determined by popular vote, but instead via results by each riding. Click the map for more details.
Premier before election
Roger Grimes
Liberal
Premier after election
Danny Williams
Progressive Conservative

The 2003 Newfoundland and Labrador general election was held on October 21, 2003, to elect the 48 members of the 45th General Assembly of Newfoundland and Labrador. The election was called on September 29 by Premier Roger Grimes of the Liberal Party of Newfoundland and Labrador.

== Opinion polls ==
Evolution of voting intentions at provincial level
Polling firm	Last day of survey	Source	PCNL	LPNL	NLNDP	Other	ME	Sample
Election 2003	October 21, 2003		58.71	33.05	6.86	1.38		
Corporate Research Associates Inc.	October 2003		57	33	6	—N/a	4.4	—N/a
Corporate Research Associates Inc.	August 2003		54	36	6	—N/a	3.5	801
Election 1999	February 9, 1999		40.77	49.62	8.23	1.38		

== Results ==
This election marked only the third change of government in the 54 years since the province joined Canada. The Liberals, led by Roger Grimes, were soundly defeated by the Danny Williams-led Progressive Conservative Party, who took almost three-quarters of the seats in the House of Assembly and well over half of the popular vote. The Liberals lost seven of their 17 Cabinet ministers, along with the Speaker of the House, from the preceding government. Jack Harris and the New Democrats hopes to increase their seat total from two were frustrated, although their incumbents were re-elected.

=== Results by party ===
Summary of the Legislative Assembly of Newfoundland and Labrador election results
Party	Party leader	Candidates	Seats				Popular vote		
Party	Party leader	Candidates	1999	Dissol.	2003	Change	#	%	Change
Progressive Conservative	Danny Williams	48	14	19	34	+78.9%	162,949	58.71%	+17.94%
Liberal	Roger Grimes	48	32	27	12	-55.6%	91,729	33.05%	-16.57%
New Democratic	Jack Harris	34	2	2	2	-	19,048	6.86%	-1.37%
Independent and no affiliation		13	-	-	-	-	3,812	1.38%	-%
Total		143	48	48	48	-	277,538	100.00%	

=== Results by region ===
Party name		St. John's	Avalon/Burin	Central/Southern	Western	Labrador	Total
Parties winning seats in the legislature:
Progressive Conservative	Seats:	13	5	8	7	1	34
Progressive Conservative	Popular vote:	67.73%	57.61%	54.02%	57.48%	30.52%	58.71%
Liberal	Seats:	-	4	5	1	2	12
Liberal	Popular vote:	19.43%	38.17%	42.78%	40.16%	29.93%	33.05%
New Democratic	Seats:	1	-	-	-	1	2
New Democratic	Popular vote:	12.59%	4.20%	2.62%	1.61%	21.65%	6.86%
Parties not winning seats in the legislature:
Other	Popular vote:	0.25%	0.02%	0.58%	0.75%	17.90%	1.38%
Total seats:		14	9	13	8	4	48

== Results by riding ==
- Names in **boldface type** represent party leaders.
- † represents that the incumbent is not running again.

=== St. John's ===
Electoral district	Candidates				Incumbent
Electoral district	Liberal	PC	NDP	Other	Incumbent
Kilbride; 70.54% turnout	Joe Wadden; 1,071; 15.77%	Ed Byrne; 5,315; 78.28%	David Reynolds; 404; 5.95%		Ed Byrne
St. John's Centre; 70.51% turnout	Joan Marie Aylward; 1,763; 29.05%	Shawn Skinner; 3,349; 55.19%	Carol Cantwell; 956; 15.75%		Joan Marie Aylward
St. John's East; 65.68% turnout	George Murphy; 862; 14.56%	John Ottenheimer; 4,151; 70.11%	Bruce Clark; 841; 14.21%	Steve Durant (Independent); 66; 1.11%	John Ottenheimer
St. John's North; 62.69% turnout	Jeff Brace; 1,433; 26.74%	Bob Ridgley; 3,107; 57.97%	Liam Walsh; 820; 15.30%		Lloyd Matthews†
St. John's South; 67.72% turnout	Dennis O'Keefe; 756; 12.68%	Tom Osborne; 4,532; 75.99%	Tom McGinnis; 676; 11.33%		Tom Osborne
St. John's West; 66.91% turnout	Tom Hann; 1,292; 20.48%	Sheila Osborne; 4,557; 72.23%	Raj Sharan; 460; 7.29%		Sheila Osborne
Signal Hill—Quidi Vidi; 67.55% turnout	Ray O'Neill; 391; 7.72%	Karen Carroll; 2,221; 43.82%	**Jack Harris**; 2,456; 48.46%		**Jack Harris**
Virginia Waters; 69.14% turnout	Walter Noel; 2,358; 32.67%	Kathy Dunderdale; 4,193; 58.10%	Dave Sullivan; 666; 9.23%		Walter Noel

=== St. John's suburbs ===
Electoral district	Candidates				Incumbent
Electoral district	Liberal	PC	NDP	Other	Incumbent
Cape St. Francis; 78.42% turnout	Bill Tapper; 1,294; 16.43%	Jack Byrne; 5,604; 71.13%	Ralph Tapper; 980; 12.44%		Jack Byrne
Conception Bay East and Bell Island; 77.71% turnout	Jim Walsh; 1,870; 25.41%	Dianne Whalen; 4,147; 56.36%	Ken Kavanaugh; 1,180; 16.04%	Doug Cole (Independent); 171; 2.32%	Jim Walsh
Conception Bay South; 72.74% turnout	Sheina Lerman; 372; 5.51%	Terry French; 5,606; 83.10%	Andy Lewis; 768; 11.38%		Terry French
Mount Pearl; 68.79% turnout	Wayne Ralph; 798; 11.46%	Dave Denine; 5,662; 81.30%	Roy Locke; 504; 7.24%		Julie Bettney†
Topsail; 80.53% turnout	Ralph Wiseman; 2,354; 28.78%	Elizabeth Marshall; 5,354; 65.45%	Michael Kehoe; 472; 5.77%		Ralph Wiseman
Waterford Valley; 66.81% turnout	Averill Baker; 1,277; 20.41%	Harvey Hodder; 4,569; 73.03%	Justin Locke; 410; 6.55%		Harvey Hodder

=== Avalon and Burin peninsulas ===
Electoral district	Candidates				Incumbent
Electoral district	Liberal	PC	NDP	Other	Incumbent
Bellevue; 74.54% turnout	Percy Barrett; 2,623; 48.17%	Joan Cleary; 2,523; 46.34%	Michael Fahey; 299; 5.49%		Percy Barrett
Burin—Placentia West; 82.20% turnout	Sam Synard; 2,133; 34.04%	Clyde Jackman; 3,450; 55.05%	Wayne Butler; 684; 10.91%		Mary Hodder†
Carbonear—Harbour Grace; 77.95% turnout	George Sweeney; 3,699; 53.84%	John Babb; 3,165; 46.11%			George Sweeney
Ferryland; 71.73% turnout	Andrea Kavanagh; 504; 8.41%	Loyola Sullivan; 5,167; 85.25%	Lois Martin; 309; 5.16%	Pilar Riego-Hickey (Independent); 11; 0.18%	Loyola Sullivan
Grand Bank; 85.51% turnout	Judy Foote; 3,101; 49.26%	Darin King; 3,058; 48.58%	Bill Wakeley; 136; 2.16%		Judy Foote
Harbour Main—Whitbourne; 83.69% turnout	Fred Akerman; 1,482; 21.98%	Tom Hedderson; 4,769; 70.71%	Eugene Conway; 493; 7.31%		Tom Hedderson
Placentia and St. Mary's; 84.87% turnout	Kevin Power; 1,812; 31.73%	Fabian Manning; 3,746; 65.60%	Janet Stringer; 152; 2.66%		Fabian Manning
Port de Grave; 74.97% turnout	Roland Butler; 3,983; 62.66%	Clarence Gosse; 2,374; 37.34%			Roland Butler
Trinity—Bay de Verde; 81.40% turnout	Lloyd Snow; 2,095; 32.37%	Charlene Johnson; 4,091; 63.20%	Victoria Harnum; 287; 4.43%		Lloyd Snow

=== Central Newfoundland ===
Electoral district	Candidates				Incumbent
Electoral district	Liberal	PC	NDP	Other	Incumbent
Baie Verte; 71.03% turnout	Maurice Budgell; 927; 22.69%	Paul Shelley; 3,045; 74.52%		William Day (Independent); 114; 2.79%	Paul Shelley
Bonavista North; 74.42% turnout	Churence Rogers; 2,301; 39.67%	Harry Harding; 3,384; 58.33%	Howard E. Parsons; 116; 2.00%		Harry Harding
Bonavista South; 66.82% turnout	Betty Fitzgerald; 938; 17.14%	Roger Fitzgerald; 4,354; 79.58%	Sam Kelly; 179; 3.27%		Roger Fitzgerald
Exploits; 75.26% turnout	**Roger Grimes**; 3,218; 56.14%	Clayton Forsey; 2,346; 40.93%	John L. Whelan; 168; 2.93%		**Roger Grimes**
Gander; 65.94% turnout	Dianne Crewe; 1,930; 32.72%	Kevin O'Brien; 3,621; 61.38%	Steve Johnson; 348; 5.90%		Sandra Kelly†
Grand Falls—Buchans; 70.63% turnout	Anna Thistle; 3,921; 59.21%	Paula Flood; 2,331; 35.20%	Gerry Tobin; 370; 5.59%		Anna Thistle
Lewisporte; 65.49% turnout	Todd Manuel; 1,275; 25.82%	Tom Rideout; 3,504; 70.96%		Garry Vatcher (Independent); 159; 3.22%	Tom Rideout
Terra Nova; 79.03% turnout	Tom Lush; 2,614; 43.96%	Paul Oram; 3,114; 52.37%	Herbert Ralph; 218; 3.67%		Tom Lush
Trinity North; 76.88% turnout	Kathryn Small; 1,640; 26.86%	Ross Wiseman; 4,126; 67.57%	Howard W. Duffett; 340; 5.57%		Ross Wiseman
Twillingate and Fogo; 72.73% turnout	Gerry Reid; 2,941; 55.75%	Derrick Dalley; 2,334; 44.25%			Gerry Reid
Windsor—Springdale; 65.82% turnout	Barry Oake; 1,826; 32.62%	Ray Hunter; 3,488; 62.32%	Clar Jacobs; 138; 2.47%	Elmer Anthony (Independent); 145; 2.59%	Ray Hunter

=== Western and Southern Newfoundland ===
Electoral district	Candidates				Incumbent
Electoral district	Liberal	PC	NDP	Other	Incumbent
Bay of Islands; 76.61% turnout	Eddie Joyce; 2,907; 49.43%	Mike Monaghan; 2,760; 46.93%	Dave Quigley; 214; 3.64%		Eddie Joyce
Burgeo and La Poile; 69.79% turnout	Kelvin Parsons; 4,233; 80.77%	Stephen MacKenzie; 1,008; 19.23%			Kelvin Parsons
Fortune Bay—Cape La Hune; 72.55% turnout	Oliver Langdon; 2,880; 58.49%	Andrew Colford; 2,044; 41.52%			Oliver Langdon
Humber East; 71.90% turnout	Bob Mercer; 2,624; 39.75%	Tom Marshall; 3,976; 60.25%			Bob Mercer
Humber Valley; 78.02% turnout	Dwight Ball; 2,507; 47.28%	Kathy Goudie; 2,796; 52.72%			Rick Woodford†
Humber West; 61.52% turnout	Edward Buckle; 1,533; 27.56%	**Danny Williams**; 3,823; 68.72%	Matthew Robbins; 207; 3.72%		**Danny Williams**
Port au Port; 67.91% turnout	Gerald Smith; 2,378; 42.75%	Jim Hodder; 3,101; 55.74%		Frederick G. Ollerhead (Independent); 84; 1.51%	Gerald Smith
St. Barbe; 73.59% turnout	Ralph Payne; 1,577; 32.67%	Wallace Young; 2,948; 61.07%	Holly Patey; 293; 6.07%		Wallace Young
St. George's—Stephenville East; 70.23% turnout	Ron Dawe; 2,464; 44.31%	Joan Burke; 2,927; 52.63%		Nancy Critchley (Independent); 170; 3.06%	Kevin Aylward†
The Straits - White Bay North; 70.46% turnout	Don McDonald; 1,802; 35.95%	Trevor Taylor; 3,133; 62.50%		Ford Michelmore (Independent); 78; 1.56%	Trevor Taylor

=== Labrador ===
Electoral district	Candidates				Incumbent
Electoral district	Liberal	PC	NDP	Labrador	Incumbent
Cartwright—L'Anse au Clair; 80.47% turnout	Yvonne Jones; 1,514; 59.98%	Dennis Normore; 804; 31.85%		Frank Pye; 206; 8.16%	Yvonne Jones
Labrador West; 67.34% turnout	Doris Sacrey; 423; 8.53%	Graham Letto; 1,142; 23.03%	Randy Collins; 2,762; 55.71%	**Ern Condon**; 631; 12.73%	Randy Collins
Lake Melville; 72.56% turnout	Ken Anthony; 1,126; 24.92%	John Hickey; 1,778; 39.35%	Barbara Stickley; 129; 2.86%	Brandon Pardy; 1,485; 32.87%	Ernie McLean†
Torngat Mountains; 80.80% turnout	Wally Andersen; 934; 68.93%	Winston White; 352; 25.98%		Lucy Jararuse; 69; 5.09%	Wally Andersen

== By-elections since the general election ==
Exploits (resignation of Roger Grimes), June 23, 2005:

By-election: Exploits
Party	Candidate	Votes	%	±%
PC	Clayton Forsey	2,605	55.2	
Liberal	George Saunders	1,958	41.5	
NDP	John Whelan	159	3.4	
Total		4,722	100%	

Placentia and St. Mary's (resignation of Fabian Manning), February 21, 2006:

By-election: Placentia and St. Mary's
Party	Candidate	Votes	%	±%
PC	Felix Collins	2,247	46.3	
Independent	Nick Careen	1,641	33.8	
Liberal	Kevin Power	931	19.2	
Newfoundland and Labrador First	Tom Hickey	31	0.6	
Total		4,850		

Signal Hill-Quidi Vidi (resignation of Jack Harris), November 1, 2006:

By-election: Signal Hill—Quidi Vidi
Party	Candidate	Votes	%	±%
NDP	Lorraine Michael	1,968	55.23	+6.77
PC	Jerome Kennedy	1,595	44.77	+0.95
Total		3,563	100%	

Ferryland (resignation of Loyola Sullivan), February 8, 2007:

By-election: Ferryland
Party	Candidate	Votes	%	±%
PC	Keith Hutchings	2,770	75.52	-10.73
Liberal	Kevin Bennett	715	19.49	+11.08
NDP	Rick Boland	183	4.99	-0.17
Total		3,668	100%	

Kilbride (resignation of Ed Byrne), February 8, 2007:

By-election: Kilbride
Party	Candidate	Votes	%	±%
PC	John Dinn	2,744	78.83	+0.55
Liberal	Bob Clarke	508	14.59	-1.18
NDP	Gemma Schlamp-Hickey	229	6.58	+0.63
Total		3,481	100%	

Port au Port (resignation of Jim Hodder), February 8, 2007:

By-election: Port au Port
Party	Candidate	Votes	%	±%
PC	Tony Cornect	2,701	61.99	+6.25
Liberal	Mark Felix	1,521	34.91	-7.84
NDP	Paul O'Keefe	135	3.90	*
Total		4,357	100%	

Humber Valley (resignation of Kathy Goudie), February 13, 2007:

By-election: Humber Valley
Party	Candidate	Votes	%	±%
Liberal	Dwight Ball	2,153	48.70	+1.26
PC	Darryl Kelly	2,146	48.54	-4.02
NDP	Shelley Senior	122	2.76	*
Total		4,421	100%	

Newfoundland and Labrador provincial by-election, February 13, 2007: Labrador West
Party	Candidate	Votes	%	±%
Progressive Conservative	Jim Baker	1,666	41.62	+18.59
New Democratic	Darrell Brenton	1,240	30.98	−24.73
Labrador	Ron Barron	670	16.74	+4.01
Liberal	Karen Oldford	427	10.66	–
Total		4,451	100%	+2.13
Called upon the resignation of Randy Collins.

== See also ==
- 2007 Newfoundland and Labrador provincial by-elections
- 45th General Assembly of Newfoundland and Labrador
- List of Newfoundland and Labrador General Assemblies
- List of Newfoundland and Labrador political parties
