= 2007 Newfoundland and Labrador provincial by-elections =

Elections in Canada

Five provincial by-elections were held in the Canadian province of Newfoundland and Labrador in 2007, following vacancies in the Newfoundland and Labrador House of Assembly. Three took place on February 8, and two took place on February 13.

In addition, one special election took place on November 6, 2007, following the death of a candidate during the general election campaign in October.

== Ferryland ==
Ferryland by-election, February 8, 2007 resignation of Loyola Sullivan
Party	Candidate	Votes	%	+/-
Progressive Conservative	Keith Hutchings	2,770	75.5	
Liberal	Kevin Bennett	715	19.5	
New Democrat	Rick Boland	183	5.0	

== Kilbride ==
Kilbride by-election, February 8, 2007 resignation of Ed Byrne
Party	Candidate	Votes	%	+/-
Progressive Conservative	John Dinn	2,744	78.8	
Liberal	Bob Clarke	508	14.6	
New Democrat	Gemma Schlamp-Hickey	229	6.6	

== Port au Port ==
Port au Port by-election, February 8, 2007 resignation of Jim Hodder
Party	Candidate	Votes	%	+/-
Progressive Conservative	Tony Cornect	2,701	62.0	
Liberal	Mark Felix	1,521	34.9	
New Democrat	Paul O'Keefe	135	3.1	

== Humber Valley ==
At first, it was announced that Darryl Kelly, the PC candidate, had won the election by a margin of twelve votes; however, it turned out that this was a mistake and that Dwight Ball, the Liberal candidate, had won by a margin of eighteen votes instead. Turnout was 62 per cent. Due to the close result of the by-election (which turned out to have been won by a margin of only nine votes in the official result), a judicial recount was ordered for March 1–2, 2007, which resulted in a reduction of Ball's lead to seven votes.

In the general election on October 9, however, Kelly defeated Ball by a 254-vote margin.

Humber Valley by-election, February 13, 2007 Resignation of Kathy Goudie
Party	Candidate	Votes	%	+/-
Liberal	Dwight Ball	2,153	48.7	
Progressive Conservative	Darryl Kelly	2,146	48.5	
New Democrat	Shelley Senior	122	2.8	

== Labrador West ==
The NDP campaign suffered a number of mishaps, most notably the decision of their presumed candidate Karen Oldford to run for the Liberals instead, and the president of the United Steelworkers union local at Wabush Mines choosing to endorse the Labrador Party instead of the NDP.

Labrador West by-election, February 13, 2007 resignation of Randy Collins
Party	Candidate	Votes	%	+/-
Progressive Conservative	Jim Baker	1,666	41.6	
New Democrat	Darrel Brenton	1,240	31.0	
Labrador Party	Ron Barron	670	16.7	
Liberal	Karen Oldford	427	10.7	

== Grand Falls-Windsor-Buchans ==
During the general election campaign, Liberal candidate Gerry Tobin died on October 1. As a result, the election was deferred in this district from October 9 to November 6. The new Liberal candidate, John Woodrow, withdrew from the race on November 3 after it was revealed that he had previously made false allegations of bribery against MHA Beaton Tulk in 1998, but then revived his campaign on November 5 after learning that it was too late to actually remove his name from the ballot.

Grand Falls-Windsor-Buchans special election, November 6, 2007
Party	Candidate	Votes	%	+/-
Progressive Conservative	Susan Sullivan	2,767	71.83	
New Democrat	Junior C. Downey	922	23.93	
Liberal	John J. Woodrow	163	4.23	
