= Dale Kirby =

Canadian politician (born 1971)

The Honourable Dale Kirby ECNL Ph.D.

Minister of Education and Early Childhood Development
- In office December 14, 2015 – April 3, 2018
- Preceded by: Susan Sullivan
- Succeeded by: Al Hawkins

Member of the Newfoundland and Labrador House of Assembly for Mount Scio
- In office November 30, 2015 – April 17, 2019
- Preceded by: New District
- Succeeded by: Sarah Stoodley

Member of the Newfoundland and Labrador House of Assembly for St. John's North
- In office November 9, 2011 – November 5, 2015
- Preceded by: Bob Ridgley
- Succeeded by: riding dissolved

Personal details
- Born: May 19, 1971 (age 55) St. Lawrence, Newfoundland, Canada
- Party: New Democrat (1999–2013); Independent (2013–2014); Liberal (2014–2018); Independent (2018–2019)
- Occupation: University Professor

Dale Kirby (born May 19, 1971) is a politician who served in the Newfoundland and Labrador House of Assembly from 2011 to 2019.

He served as Minister of Education and Early Childhood Development in the Ball government from 2015 to 2018.

== Early life ==
Kirby was born in St. Lawrence on the Burin Peninsula. He was raised on a small farm in Lord's Cove where generations of his family have worked in inshore fishing industries. Kirby began working at an early age at Kirby's Store, later Kirby's Kwik-Way, a family-run grocery and convenience store. He graduated from St. Joseph's Academy in 1989.

=== University studies and student activism ===
Kirby earned Bachelor of Science and Master of Education degrees from Memorial University of Newfoundland before completing a doctorate in higher education theory and policy studies at the University of Toronto. While at university, he held a number of elected student union positions at the local, provincial, and national levels. As chairperson of the Newfoundland and Labrador component of the Canadian Federation of Students in the 1990s, Kirby led a successful campaign to freeze college and university tuition fees in Newfoundland and Labrador.

== Academic career ==
In 2006, Kirby was appointed an assistant professor of post-secondary education studies in the Faculty of Education at Memorial University of Newfoundland. He was promoted to the position of associate professor in 2011. Prior to joining Memorial University, he worked as a senior advisor on education policy in the Ontario Public Service.

Kirby is a professor, researcher, and consultant on student access and participation in college and university and in the area of online learning. In recognition of his contributions and advocacy, the Canadian Council on Learning named him a Minerva Scholar in 2007. In 2011, he received the R. W. B. Jackson Award from the Canadian Educational Researchers Association as well the Best Research Paper Award at the 2011 European Distance and E-Learning Network Annual Conference.

== Politics ==
Kirby was first elected in 2011 to represent the electoral district of St. John's North as a member of the Newfoundland and Labrador New Democratic Party. Kirby left the NDP caucus in 2013 after a high-profile, public dispute with NDP leader Lorraine Michael, and later joined the Newfoundland and Labrador Liberal Party. He was reelected in the 2015 provincial election as a Liberal in the new district of Mount Scio.

Kirby was sworn at Government House as Minister of Education and Early Childhood Development by Lieutenant Governor Frank Fagan on December 14, 2015. Kirby was Minister of Education and Early Childhood Development for Newfoundland and Labrador from 2015 to 2018 during which time he oversaw the implementation of full-day Kindergarten across the province. He also oversaw the work of the Task Force on Improving Educational Outcomes which carried out a comprehensive review of the Newfoundland and Labrador public school system.

On April 30, 2018 Kirby resigned from the Liberal cabinet following allegations of harassment by Liberal MHAs Colin Holloway and Pam Parsons. Kirby sat as an Independent during an investigation of the complaint by the Commissioner for Legislative Standards. On August 27, 2018, CBC released a copy of a report by the Commissioner for Legislative Standards that cleared him and Eddie Joyce of wrongdoing in all the allegations made by fellow Liberal MHA Colin Holloway. On October 20, 2018, Kirby shared the results of the report regarding MHA Pam Parsons’ complaint to the public. Kirby was cleared on all complaints, except ”seeking a personal benefit” in a comment to Parsons about a school petition at the 2016 Liberal Party AGM; the report recommended a sanction by the House of Assembly on that count.

Kirby did not seek re-election in the 2019 election.

== Electoral history ==
2015 Newfoundland and Labrador general election
Party	Candidate	Votes	%	±%
Liberal	Dale Kirby	1,899	47.1	+42.8
Progressive Conservative	Rhonda Churchill-Herder	1,104	27.4	-13.1
New Democratic	Sean Panting	1,030	25.5	-29.7

2011 Newfoundland and Labrador general election
Party	Candidate	Votes	%	±%
New Democratic	Dale Kirby	2,595	55.2	+45.2
Progressive Conservative	Bob Ridgley	1,905	40.5	-37.1
Liberal	Elizabeth Scammell-Reynolds	201	4.3	-8.7

1999 Newfoundland and Labrador general election
Party	Candidate	Votes	%	±%
Liberal	Lloyd Matthews	2,304	45.5	-10.9
Progressive Conservative	Ray Andrews	1,971	38.9	+5.4
New Democratic	Dale Kirby	788	15.6	+5.3
