= Calvin Peach =

Canadian politician

Member of the Newfoundland and Labrador House of Assembly for Bellevue
- In office November 1, 2007 – 2015
- Preceded by: Percy Barrett
- Succeeded by: riding dissolved

Mayor of Norman's Cove-Long Cove
- In office 1997–2007
- Preceded by: Allison Temple
- Succeeded by: Eva Bennett

Personal details
- Born: September 28, 1953 (age 72)
- Party: Progressive Conservative
- Other political affiliations: Newfoundland and Labrador New Democratic Party (1985)

Calvin Peach (born September 28, 1953) is a former Canadian politician. He represented the district of Bellevue in the Newfoundland and Labrador House of Assembly from 2007 until 2015. He is a member of the Progressive Conservatives. His district was redistricted in 2015 and Peach unsuccessfully ran in the new district of Placentia West-Bellevue.

He is the former mayor of Norman's Cove, Newfoundland and Labrador.

Peach ran in the district of Grand bank in the 1985 Newfoundland election as a NDP but loss to Bill Matthews.

== Electoral record ==
2015 Newfoundland and Labrador general election
Party	Candidate	Votes	%	±%
Liberal	Mark Browne	3,645	63.7	–
Progressive Conservative	Calvin Peach	1,931	33.7	–
New Democratic	Bobbie Warren	146	2.6	–

2011 Newfoundland and Labrador general election
Party	Candidate	Votes	%	±%
Progressive Conservative	Calvin Peach	3,005	60.26	–
NDP	Gabe Ryan	1,356	27.19	
Liberal	Pam Pardy Ghent	626	12.55	

2007 Newfoundland and Labrador general election
Party	Candidate	Votes	%	±%
Progressive Conservative	Calvin Peach	2908	55.9	–
Liberal	Denise Pike	2139	41.12	
NDP	Ian Slade	155	3.1	

1985 Newfoundland and Labrador general election
Party	Candidate	Votes	%	±%
Progressive Conservative	Bill Matthews	3028	49.3	–
Liberal	T. Maxwell Snook	2689	43.7	
NDP	Calvin Peach	431	7.0	
