= Wilson Callan =

Canadian politician

MHA for Bellevue
- In office 1975–1979
- Preceded by: Don Jamieson
- Succeeded by: Percy Barrett
- In office 1981–1985
- Succeeded by: Don Jamieson

Personal details
- Born: October 8, 1939 Norman's Cove-Long Cove, Dominion of Newfoundland
- Died: August 13, 2022 (aged 82) Carbonear, Newfoundland and Labrador, Canada
- Party: Reform Liberal (1975–1976); Liberal (1976–1979); Progressive Conservative (from 1981)
- Spouse: Ella Smith

Wilson Elwood Callan (October 8, 1939 – August 13, 2022) was a Canadian politician. He represented the electoral district of Bellevue in the Newfoundland and Labrador House of Assembly from 1975 to 1979 and 1981 to 1985. He was a member of the Newfoundland Reform Liberal Party and Liberal for his first term and a member of the Progressive Conservative Party of Newfoundland and Labrador for his second.

He was born in Norman's Cove-Long Cove. Callan was first elected to the Newfoundland assembly as a Reform Liberal member. He joined the Liberals in September 1976. Callan stepped aside to allow Liberal leader Don Jamieson to run in Bellevue in the 1979 general election. After Jamieson resigned in 1981, Callan was elected in a by-election. He was elected again in 1982 and 1985. He later joined the Conservatives. Callan did not run for reelection in 1989.
