= Bellevue (electoral district) =

Former provincial electoral district in Newfoundland and Labrador, Canada

Coordinates: 47.734°N 54.263°W

Newfoundland and Labrador electoral district
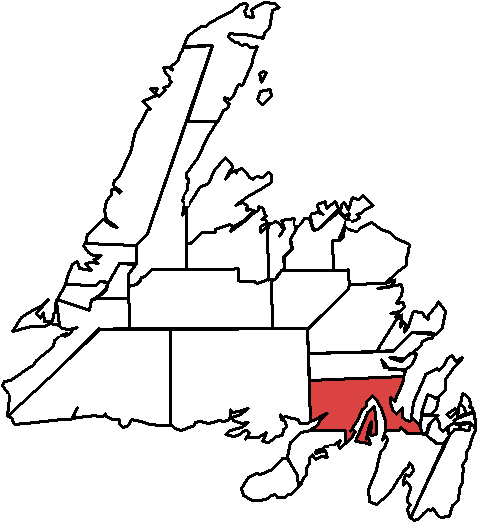
- Bellvue in relation to other district in Newfoundland

Defunct provincial electoral district
- Legislature: Newfoundland and Labrador House of Assembly
- District created: 1975
- First contested: 1975
- Last contested: 2011

Demographics
- Population (2006): 11,005
- Electors (2011): 7,680

Bellevue is a former provincial electoral district for the House of Assembly of Newfoundland and Labrador, Canada. In 2003 it had 7,310 eligible voters. The district was abolished in 2015 and replaced by Placentia West-Bellevue.

The district combines traditional fishing communities such as Southern Harbour and Arnold's Cove with the heavy industry of Come By Chance (an oil refinery) and Sunnyside (near the Bull Arm offshore fabrication site). It is also one of the few districts to have elected a member of the Reform Liberal Party — a breakoff bloc of the provincial Liberals led by ex-Liberal leader Joey Smallwood in the 1970s.

The communities located within the district; Arnold's Cove, Bay L'Argent, Bellevue, Blaketown, Chance Cove, Chapel Arm, Come by Chance, English Harbour East, Fair Haven, Garden Cove, Goobies, Grand le Pierre, Harbour Mille, Jacques Fontaine, Little Bay East, Little Harbour East, Long Cove, Long Harbour, Mount Arlington Heights, Monkstown, Norman's Cove, North Harbour, Old Shop, St. Bernard's, South Dildo, Southern Harbour, Sunnyside, Swift Current, Terrenceville, Thornlea.

== Members of the House of Assembly ==
The district has elected the following members of the House of Assembly:

Election	Years	Member	Party
9th	1975–1976	Wilson Callan	Reform Liberal
9th	1976–1979	Wilson Callan	Liberal
10th	1979–1981	Don Jamieson	Liberal
10th	1981–1982	Wilson Callan	Progressive Conservative
11th	1982–1985	Wilson Callan	Progressive Conservative
12th	1985–1989	Percy Barrett	Liberal
13th	1989–1993	Percy Barrett	Liberal
14th	1993–1996	Percy Barrett	Liberal
15th	1996–1999	Percy Barrett	Liberal
16th	1999–2003	Percy Barrett	Liberal
17th	2003–2007	Percy Barrett	Liberal
18th	2007–2011	Calvin Peach	Progressive Conservative
19th	2011–2015	Calvin Peach	Progressive Conservative

== Election results ==
2011 Newfoundland and Labrador general election
Party	Candidate	Votes	%
Progressive Conservative	Calvin Peach	3,005	60.26
New Democratic	Gabe Ryan	1,356	27.19
Liberal	Pamela Pardy-Ghent	626	12.55
Total valid votes		4,987	99.78
Total rejected ballots		11	0.22
Turnout		4,998	65.34
Electors on the lists		7,649	–

2007 Newfoundland and Labrador general election
Party	Candidate	Votes	%
Progressive Conservative	Calvin Peach	2,908	55.9
Liberal	Denise Pike	2,139	41.12
New Democratic	Ian Slade	155	3.10
Total valid votes		5,202	99.84
Total rejected ballots		8	0.16
Turnout		5,210	68.11
Electors on the lists		7,649	–

2003 Newfoundland and Labrador general election
Party	Candidate	Votes	%	±%
Liberal	Percy Barrett	2623	48.17	-13.09
Progressive Conservative	Joan Cleary	2523	46.34	+14.71
NDP	Michael Fahey	299	5.49	-1.62

1999 Newfoundland and Labrador general election
Party	Candidate	Votes	%	±%
Liberal	Percy Barrett	3229	61.26	-1.85%
Progressive Conservative	Gus Coombs	1667	31.63	-0.70%
NDP	Moses Ingram	375	7.11	+2.56%

1996 Newfoundland and Labrador general election
Party	Candidate	Votes	%	±%
Liberal	Percy Barrett	3576	63.11	
Progressive Conservative	Nick Careen	1832	32.33	–
NDP	Lee Ingram	258	4.55	

== See also ==
- List of Newfoundland and Labrador provincial electoral districts
- Canadian provincial electoral districts
