= Al Hawkins =

Canadian politician

The Honourable Al Hawkins ECNL

Minister of Transportation and Works of Newfoundland and Labrador
- In office December 14, 2015 – July 31, 2017
- Preceded by: David Brazil
- Succeeded by: Steve Crocker

Member of the Newfoundland and Labrador House of Assembly for Grand Falls-Windsor-Buchans
- In office November 30, 2015 – April 17, 2019
- Preceded by: Susan Sullivan
- Succeeded by: Chris Tibbs

Minister of Advance Education Skills and Labour, Minister of Education and Early Childhood Development, And Registrar General
- In office 2009 – July 31, 2017
- Preceded by: Office Established
- Succeeded by: Brian Warr

Personal details
- Party: Liberal
- Website: https://www.tw.gov.nl.ca/

Al Hawkins is a Canadian politician, who was elected to the Newfoundland and Labrador House of Assembly in the 2015 provincial election. He represented the electoral district of Grand Falls-Windsor-Buchans as a member of the Liberal Party until 2019.

Following the Liberals forming government in the 2015 election, Hawkins served as Minister of Transportation and Works. In September 2017, he was shuffled to Minister of Advanced Education, Skills and Labour, and in November 2018, was moved to Minister of Education and Early Childhood Development.

Prior to his election to the legislature, Hawkins served as mayor of Grand Falls-Windsor. He also served on the board of directors of Newfoundland and Labrador Hydro, Bull Arm Fabrication and Nalcor.

He was defeated in the 2019 provincial election.

Newfoundland and Labrador provincial government of Dwight Ball
Cabinet posts (3)
Predecessor	Office	Successor
Andrew Parsons	Minister of Education and Early Childhood Development; November 8, 2018–April 17, 2019	Incumbent
Gerry Byrne	Minister of Advanced Education and Skills; July 31, 2017–November 8, 2018	Bernard Davis
David Brazil	Minister of Transportation and Works; December 14, 2015–July 31, 2017	Steve Crocker
