= Jim Hodder =

Jim Hodder may refer to:

- Jim Hodder (musician) (1947–1990), American drummer
- Jim Hodder (politician) (1940–2021), Canadian politician for Port au Port
