= Phil Warren =

Phil Warren may refer to:

- Phil Warren (politician) (born 1933), educator and politician in Newfoundland
- Phil Warren (promoter) (1930s–2002), New Zealand music promoter, manager, agent and politician
