= John Carter (Canadian politician) =

Canadian politician (1933–2017)

MHA St. John's North
- In office 1971–1989
- Preceded by: Nathaniel Noel
- Succeeded by: Phil Warren

Minister of Education and Youth
- In office January 18, 1972 – December 1, 1972
- Preceded by: Hubert Kitchen
- Succeeded by: Gerry Ottenheimer

Personal details
- Born: May 15, 1933
- Died: December 29, 2017 (aged 84)

John A. Carter (May 15, 1933 – December 29, 2017) was a Canadian farmer and politician. He represented St. John's North in the Newfoundland House of Assembly from 1971 to 1989.

== Early life ==
Carter was born to Allan and Eda (Pittman) in St. John's, Newfoundland and Labrador on May 15, 1933. Carter attended school at Bishop Field College and Saint Bonaventure's College, and he is a Memorial University Of Newfoundland graduate. In 1960, Carter married Brenda Marjorie Murphy.

== Career ==
Carter was the owner/operator of Mount Scio Farm, a major producer of the herb summer savoury in Eastern Canada.

Carter served as President of his province's Progressive Conservative Party.

In 1971, he was elected to the Newfoundland and Labrador House of Assembly as the member for St. John's North. He also served as Minister of Education and Youth in the Frank Moores' government. In 1977, Carter was the sole member to object to the filming of former premier, Joey Smallwood's, final speech on his retirement from parliament.

Carter was reelected five times represented the district until 1989.

== Death ==
He died on December 29, 2017, at the age of 84 after a brief illness.
