= Percy Barrett =

Canadian politician

The Honourable Percy Barrett ECNL

Member of the House of Assembly for Bellevue
- In office 1989–2007
- Preceded by: Wilson Callan
- Succeeded by: Calvin Peach

Minister of Works, Services, and Transportation
- In office February 13, 2001 – February 17, 2003
- Preceded by: Rick Woodford
- Succeeded by: Jim Walsh

Minister of Labour
- In office February 17, 2003 – November 6, 2003
- Preceded by: Anna Thistle
- Succeeded by: Tom Osborne

Personal details
- Born: Woody Island, Dominion of Newfoundland

Percy Barrett (born April 7, 1948) is an educator and former political figure in Newfoundland and Labrador, Canada. He represented Bellevue in the Newfoundland and Labrador House of Assembly from 1989 to 2007 as a Liberal.

He was born in Woody Island, the son of Sidney Barrett, and was educated at Memorial University and the Ontario Institute for Studies in Education. Barrett was a school principal and was also an administrator in adult education and continuing education programs. In 1968, he married Leona Penney. Barrett was a member of the provincial cabinet, serving as Minister of Works, Services and Transportation and as Minister of Labour.

Barrett was accused of overspending his constituency allowance while serving in the assembly and paid back funds in 2008 after he was sued by the province. An earlier police investigation found that there was insufficient evidence to proceed with criminal charges against Barrett in connection with the overspending.
