= Chris Tibbs =

Canadian politician (born 1977)

The Honourable Chris Tibbs ECNL MHA
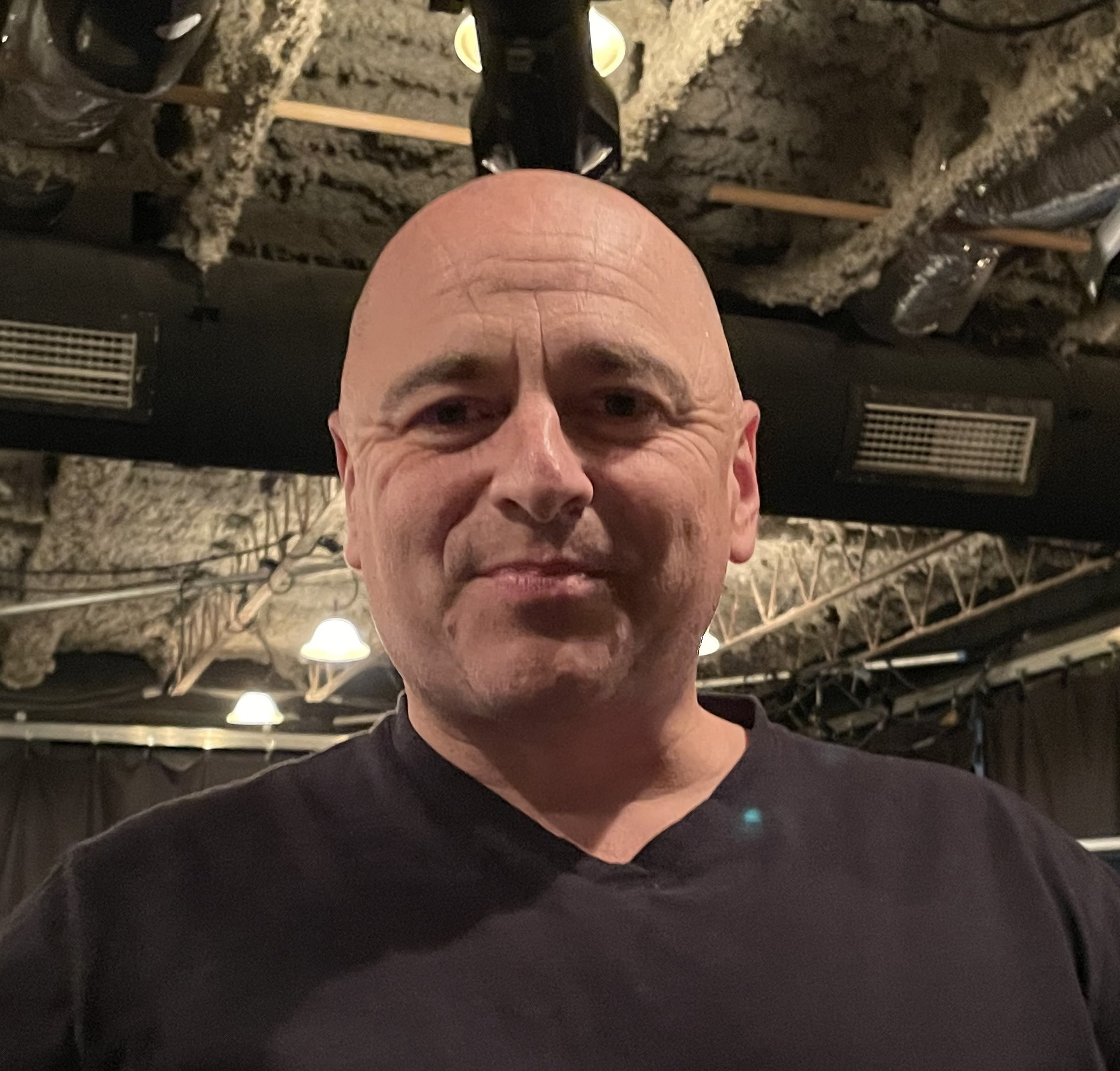
- Tibbs in 2026

Member of the Newfoundland and Labrador House of Assembly for Grand Falls-Windsor-Buchans
- Incumbent
- Assumed office May 16, 2019
- Preceded by: Al Hawkins

Minister of Municipal and Community Affairs, And Registrar General
- In office October 29, 2025 – August 20, 2026
- Preceded by: Paul Pike
- Succeeded by: Barry Petten

Minister of Environment, Conservation, and Climate Change
- In office October 29, 2025 – August 20, 2026
- Preceded by: Scott Reid
- Succeeded by: Andrea Barbour

Minister of Social Supports and Well-Being
- Incumbent
- Assumed office August 20, 2026
- Preceded by: Joedy Wall

Minister of Housing
- Incumbent
- Assumed office August 20, 2026
- Preceded by: Joedy Wall

Minister of Poverty Reduction
- Incumbent
- Assumed office August 20, 2026
- Preceded by: Joedy Wall

Personal details
- Born: April 8, 1977 (age 49) Grand Falls-Windsor, Newfoundland, Canada
- Party: Progressive Conservative
- Occupation: Paramedic, politician

Christopher Earl Tibbs (born April 8, 1977) is a Canadian politician, who was elected to the Newfoundland and Labrador House of Assembly in the 2019 provincial election. He represents the electoral district of Grand Falls-Windsor-Buchans as a member of the Newfoundland and Labrador Progressive Conservative Party.

== Background ==
Tibbs was born in Grand Falls-Windsor where he resides with his wife Danielle and his two sons Declan and Xander. Prior to politics, Tibbs worked as a paramedic before going on to study tourism in Dublin, Ireland. Since the mid-2000s, he has worked in the oil and gas sector.

== Politics ==
Tibbs was first elected in the 2019 provincial election. He was re-elected in the 2021 provincial election.

During the 2021 to 2025 legislative session, Tibbs was shadow minister for Digital Government and Service NL, OCIO, and Fire and Emergency Services NL.

Tibbs supported Lloyd Parrott in the 2023 provincial PC party leadership race.

Tibbs was re-elected in the 2025 provincial election.

On October 29, 2025, Tibbs was appointed Minister of Municipal and Community Affairs, Registrar General, Minister of Community Engagement, Minister of Environment, Conservation, and Climate change, and Minister Responsible for Multi-Material Stewardship Board.

On August 20, 2026, a shuffle occurred within the Wakeham ministry, and Tibbs received the new roles of Minister of Social Supports and Well-Being, Minister of Housing, Minister of Poverty Reduction, and Minister Responsible for the Status of Persons with Disabilities.

On September 17, 2026, Tibbs voted to approve the Churchill Falls Definitive Cooperation and Implementation Agreement (DCIA) in the House of Assembly along with the PC caucus.

== Election results ==
2025 Newfoundland and Labrador general election: Grand Falls-Windsor-Buchans
Party	Candidate	Votes	%	±%
Progressive Conservative	Chris Tibbs	3,408	59.0%	-0.24
Liberal	Barry Manuel	2,144	37.1%	-1.37
New Democratic	Liz Noseworthy	229	4.0%	+1.70
Total valid votes				
Total rejected ballots				
Turnout				
Eligible voters				
Progressive Conservative hold		Swing		+

2021 Newfoundland and Labrador general election: Grand Falls-Windsor-Buchans
Party	Candidate	Votes	%	±%
Progressive Conservative	Chris Tibbs	2,735	59.24	+6.08
Liberal	Debbie Ball	1,776	38.47	-8.37
New Democratic	Holly Pike	106	2.30	
Total valid votes		4,617		
Total rejected ballots				
Turnout				
Eligible voters				
Progressive Conservative hold		Swing		-7.23
Source(s) "Officially Nominated Candidates General Election 2021" (PDF). Elections Newfoundland and Labrador. "NL Election 2021 (Unofficial Results)".

2019 Newfoundland and Labrador general election
Party	Candidate	Votes	%	±%
Progressive Conservative	Chris Tibbs	2,935		
Liberal	Al Hawkins	2,586		
Total valid votes				
Total rejected ballots				
Turnout				
Eligible voters				
