= Kathy Goudie =

Canadian politician

MHA for Humber Valley
- In office 2003 – January 19, 2007
- Preceded by: Rick Woodford
- Succeeded by: Dwight Ball

Personal details
- Party: Progressive Conservative
- Occupation: Nurse

Kathy Goudie is a Canadian politician who represented the electoral district of Humber Valley in the Newfoundland and Labrador House of Assembly from 2003 to 2007.

She resigned from the legislature on January 19, 2007, after the province's auditor general, John Noseworthy, found she had double-billed $3,818 in constituency expenses. Goudie, who attributed the double-billing to a clerical error, repaid the amount and police later determined that there were insufficient grounds to lay criminal charges.

== Electoral record ==
2003 Newfoundland and Labrador general election: Humber Valley
Party	Candidate	Votes	%	±%
Progressive Conservative	Kathy Goudie	2,796	52.72	+20.93
Liberal	Dwight Ball	2,507	47.28	-20.93
Total valid votes		5,303	99.44	
Total rejected ballots		30	0.56	+0.18
Turnout		5,333	78.02	+19.92
Eligible voters		6,835		
Progressive Conservative gain from Liberal		Swing		+20.93
