= Ralph Wiseman =

Canadian politician

Minister of Human Resources and Employment
- In office April 4, 2002 – November 5, 2003
- Preceded by: Gerald Smith
- Succeeded by: Office Abolished

Minister of the Environment
- In office February 13, 2001 – April 4, 2002
- Preceded by: Kevin Aylward
- Succeeded by: Kevin Aylward

MHA for Topsail
- In office 1996–2003
- Succeeded by: Elizabeth Marshall

Personal details
- Party: Liberal Party of Newfoundland and Labrador

Ralph Wiseman is a Canadian politician. He was a Liberal Party member of the Newfoundland and Labrador House of Assembly from 1996 to 2003, representing the electoral district of Topsail.

Wiseman was elected to the Newfoundland assembly in 1996 and was reelected in 1999. He served in the provincial cabinet as Minister of Environment and as Minister of Human Resources and Employment. He was defeated by Elizabeth Marshall when he ran for reelection in 2003.

In the 2005 municipal elections, he was elected mayor of Paradise, Newfoundland and Labrador. In the subsequent 2009 municipal elections, he was re-elected to a second term as mayor in a draw, after a series of recounts confirmed that he and 19-year-old challenger Kurtis Coombs had finished in an exact tie.

Wiseman elected not to run in the municipal election held in September 2013. He was succeeded as mayor by Dan Bobbett, a former town councillor.
