= Mike Mackey =

Canadian politician

Mike Mackey MHA

Member of the Newfoundland House of Assembly for Grand Falls
- In office 27 June 1995 – 22 February 1996
- Preceded by: Len Simms
- Succeeded by: Anna Thistle

Personal details
- Born: c. 1942 St. Brendan's, Newfoundland
- Party: Progressive Conservative
- Profession: Educator

Michael J. Mackey (born c. 1942) is a Canadian politician from Newfoundland and Labrador. He was the member of the Newfoundland House of Assembly (MHA) for Grand Falls from 1995 to 1996.

== Politics ==
Mackey was born in the village of St. Brendan's in Bonavista Bay. He lived in Grand Falls as an adult, where he became an educator. Mackey was the regional supervisor for the provincial Department of Education's adult education program in 1980. When the Central Community College was established in Grand Falls in 1987, Mackey became the school's community director of education.

When former Progressive Conservative (PC) party leader Len Simms resigned from the House of Assembly in 1995, Mackey successfully ran as the PC candidate to succeed him in his district of Grand Falls. Mackey's tenure in the House of Assembly was brief, as he was defeated for re-election in the 1996 provincial election by his Liberal opponent Anna Thistle.

== Electoral history ==
1996 Newfoundland general election: Grand Falls-Buchans
Party	Candidate	Votes	%	±%
Liberal	Anna Thistle	3,441	50.24	▲19.18
Progressive Conservative	Mike Mackey	2,321	33.89	▼19.57
New Democratic	Joe Tremblett	1,087	15.87	▲0.45
Total valid votes		6,849	99.88	
Total rejected ballots		8	0.12	
Total votes		6,857	78.82	▲21.70
Eligible voters		8,700		
Liberal gain from Progressive Conservative		Swing		▲13.07

Provincial by-election in Grand Falls, Newfoundland, June 27, 1995
Party	Candidate	Votes	%	±%
Progressive Conservative	Mike Mackey	2,056	53.46	▼13.43
Liberal	Anna Thistle	1,197	31.06	▲3.67
New Democratic	Joe Tremblett	593	15.42	▲9.70
Total valid votes		3,846	99.79	
Total rejected ballots		8	0.21	
Total votes		3,854	57.12	
Eligible voters		6,747		
Progressive Conservative hold		Swing		▼8.93
