= Darryl Kelly =

Canadian politician

Member of the Newfoundland and Labrador House of Assembly for Humber Valley
- In office November 1, 2007 – September 19, 2011
- Preceded by: Dwight Ball
- Succeeded by: Dwight Ball

Personal details
- Died: May 19, 2019
- Party: Progressive Conservative
- Occupation: School teacher, principal

Darryl Kelly (died 2019) was a Canadian politician. He represented the riding of Humber Valley in the Newfoundland and Labrador House of Assembly from 2007 to 2011 as a member of the Progressive Conservatives.

Kelly stood as the Progressive Conservative candidate in a by-election in Humber Valley on February 13, 2007, losing by a margin of just seven votes to Liberal candidate Dwight Ball. However, Kelly defeated Ball in the general election on October 9, 2007. In the 2011 general election Kelly was defeated in a rematch against Ball.

== Electoral history ==
2011 Newfoundland and Labrador general election
Party	Candidate	Votes	%	±%
Liberal	Dwight Ball	2,609	48.14	+1.04
Progressive Conservative	Darryl Kelly	2,541	46.88	-4.54
New Democratic	Sheldon Hynes	270	4.98	+3.50
Total valid votes		5,420	99.65	
Total rejected ballots		19	0.35	+0.09
Turnout		5,439	67.77	-6.52
Eligible voters		8,026		
Liberal gain from Progressive Conservative		Swing		+2.79

2007 Newfoundland and Labrador general election
Party	Candidate	Votes	%	±%
Progressive Conservative	Darryl Kelly	3,023	51.42	+2.88
Liberal	Dwight Ball	2,769	47.10	-1.60
New Democratic	Kris Hynes	87	1.48	-1.28
Total valid votes		5,879	99.75	
Total rejected ballots		15	0.25	+0.03
Turnout		5,894	74.29	+12.21
Eligible voters		7,934		
Progressive Conservative gain from Liberal		Swing		+2.24

Humber Valley - By-election, 13 February 2007 Resignation of Kathy Goudie
Party	Candidate	Votes	%	±%
Liberal	Dwight Ball	2,153	48.70	+1.42
Progressive Conservative	Darryl Kelly	2,146	48.54	-4.18
New Democratic	Shelley Senior	122	2.76	–
Total valid votes		4,421	99.77	
Total rejected ballots		10	0.23	-0.34
Turnout		4,431	62.08	-15.95
Eligible voters		7,138		
Liberal gain from Progressive Conservative		Swing		+2.80
