= St. John's North (provincial electoral district) =

Former provincial electoral district in Newfoundland and Labrador, Canada

Newfoundland and Labrador electoral district
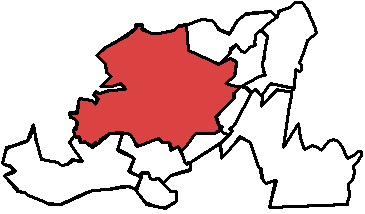
- St. John's North in relation to other districts in St. John's

Defunct provincial electoral district
- Legislature: Newfoundland and Labrador House of Assembly
- Last contested: 2011

Demographics
- Population (2006): 11,673
- Electors (2011): 8,779

St. John's North is a defunct provincial electoral district for the House of Assembly of Newfoundland and Labrador, Canada. In 2011 there were 8,779 eligible voters living within the district.

The district included a large section of central-northern St. John's. Includes commercial areas such as Kenmount Road, the Avalon Mall and the O'Leary industrial park. Stretches along Thorburn Road and takes in half of Pippy Park, including the Health Science Centre and the northern half of Memorial University. It was replaced in 2015 largely by the district of Mount Scio.

== Members of the House of Assembly ==
The district has elected the following members of the House of Assembly:

Assembly	Years	Member	Party
31st	1956–1959	George M. Nightingale	Liberal
32nd	1959–1962	George M. Nightingale	Liberal
33rd	1962–1966	Geoffrey Carnell	Liberal
34th	1966–1971	Nathaniel S. Noel	Liberal
35th	1971–1972	John Carter	Progressive Conservative
36th	1972–1975	John Carter	Progressive Conservative
37th	1975–1979	John Carter	Progressive Conservative
38th	1979–1982	John Carter	Progressive Conservative
39th	1982–1985	John Carter	Progressive Conservative
40th	1985–1989	John Carter	Progressive Conservative
41st	1989–1993	Phil Warren	Liberal
42nd	1993–1996	Lloyd Matthews	Liberal
43rd	1996–1999	Lloyd Matthews	Liberal
43rd	1999–2003	Lloyd Matthews	Liberal
44th	2003–2007	Bob Ridgley	Progressive Conservative
45th	2007–2011	Bob Ridgley	Progressive Conservative
46th	2011–2013	Dale Kirby	New Democratic
46th	2013–2014	Dale Kirby	Independent
46th	2014–2015	Dale Kirby	Liberal

== Election results ==
2011 Newfoundland and Labrador general election
Party	Candidate	Votes	%	±%
NDP	Dale Kirby	2,595	55.20	+45.22
Progressive Conservative	Bob Ridgley	1,905	40.52	-37.02
Liberal	Elizabeth Scammel Reynolds	201	4.28	-8.20
New Democratic gain from Progressive Conservative		Swing		+41.12

2007 Newfoundland and Labrador general election
Party	Candidate	Votes	%	±%
Progressive Conservative	Bob Ridgley	3488	77.55%	–
Liberal	Simon Lono	561	12.47%	
NDP	Matt Power	449	9.98%	

2003 Newfoundland and Labrador general election
Party	Candidate	Votes	%	±%
Progressive Conservative	Bob Ridgley	3107	–	–
Liberal	Jeff Brace	1433		
NDP	Liam Walsh	820		

1999 Newfoundland and Labrador general election
Party	Candidate	Votes	%	±%
Liberal	Lloyd Matthews	2304		
Progressive Conservative	Ray Andrews	1971	–	–
NDP	Dale Kirby	788		

1996 Newfoundland and Labrador general election
Party	Candidate	Votes	%	±%
Liberal	Lloyd Matthews	2789	56.4	
Progressive Conservative	Ian Carter	1649	33.3	–
NDP	Raj Sharan	510	10.3	

1993 Newfoundland and Labrador general election
Party	Candidate	Votes	%	±%
Liberal	Lloyd Matthews	2520		
Progressive Conservative	Warren Babb	1704	–	–
NDP	Sara Rich	810		

1989 Newfoundland and Labrador general election
Party	Candidate	Votes	%	±%
Liberal	Philip Warren	2705		
Progressive Conservative	Thomas Osbourne	1937	–	–
NDP	Dorothy Inglis	495		

1985 Newfoundland and Labrador general election
Party	Candidate	Votes	%	±%
Progressive Conservative	John Carter	2631	–	–
NDP	Dorothy Inglis	1431		
Liberal	Judi Murphy	1347		

1982 Newfoundland and Labrador general election
Party	Candidate	Votes	%	±%
Progressive Conservative	John A. Carter	2520	–	–
Liberal	Norman Whalen	1095		
NDP	Austin Scott	165		

== See also ==
- List of Newfoundland and Labrador provincial electoral districts
- Canadian provincial electoral districts
