= Elizabeth Marshall (politician) =

Canadian politician (born 1951)

The Honourable Elizabeth Marshall ECNL KC

Canadian Senator from Newfoundland and Labrador
- In office January 29, 2010 – March 23, 2026
- Nominated by: Stephen Harper
- Appointed by: Michaëlle Jean
- Preceded by: Joan Cook

Minister of Health and Community Services
- In office November 6, 2003 – September 27, 2004
- Preceded by: Gerald Smith
- Succeeded by: John Ottenheimer

Member of the Newfoundland House of Assembly for Topsail
- In office October 21, 2003 – January 29, 2010
- Preceded by: Ralph Wiseman
- Succeeded by: Paul Davis

Personal details
- Born: September 7, 1951 (age 75) Stephenville Crossing, Newfoundland, Canada
- Party: Conservative (federal); Progressive Conservative (provincial)
- Spouse: Stan Marshall
- Education: Memorial University of Newfoundland (BSc)

Elizabeth Marshall (born September 7, 1951) is a Canadian politician who was a member of the Senate from 2010 until 2026. Previously, she had been a longtime public servant in the government of Newfoundland and Labrador before entering politics in 2003 and serving in the provincial cabinet and the Newfoundland and Labrador House of Assembly.

== Background ==
Elizabeth Marshall was born in Stephenville Crossing, Newfoundland and Labrador. She received her early education in St. Lawrence, Corner Brook, and Grand Falls-Windsor. Marshall holds a Bachelor of Science (Math) degree from Memorial University of Newfoundland. She became a chartered accountant in 1979, and spent a number of years working in the provincial public service. She is a former Deputy Minister of Social Services and Deputy Minister of Works, Services, and Transportation. Marshall also spent a decade as Newfoundland and Labrador's Auditor General, from 1992 to 2002. She is married to businessperson Stan Marshall, the president and CEO of Nalcor Energy since April 2016, and they reside in Paradise.

== Provincial politics ==
In March 2003, Marshall became the Progressive Conservative (PC Party) candidate in the district of Topsail, when she easily defeated Gerald Spracklin in a nomination battle. In the provincial election held that October Marshall defeated Liberal incumbent Ralph Wiseman, who had been serving as the Minister of Human Resources and Employment.

Following the election Premier Danny Williams appointed Marshall as the Minister of Health and Community Services. Less than a year later in September 2004, she tendered her resignation as minister, citing Williams managerial style. Marshall stated that Williams had made decisions regarding her portfolio without consulting her, with the most recent example being a decision to provide more money to end a strike by the Victorian Order of Nurses in Corner Brook. Marshall continued to sit as a member of the House of Assembly (MHA) in the PC caucus, and stated that she agreed with the direction of the government.

In January 2007, Marshall stated that she planned on seeking re-election as the MHA for Topsail in that year's election and said she enjoyed her work outside of cabinet. She also dismissed rumours that she planned on seeking the Conservative Party of Canada nomination in the riding of St. John's East, although she admitted to being approached about running in the previous federal election.

== Federal politics ==
On January 29, 2010, Prime Minister Stephen Harper appointed Marshall to the Senate of Canada as a Conservative.

On May 25, 2011, she was appointed Government Whip, succeeding Consiglio Di Nino. In November 2013 she seconded the Martin motion that led to the suspension of Senators Patrick Brazeau, Mike Duffy and Pamela Wallin.

She retired early from the Senate effective March 23, 2026 - less than six months ahead of her 75th birthday, which would have been her mandatory retirement date.
