= John Noseworthy (Canadian politician) =

Canadian accountant and politician

Auditor General of Newfoundland and Labrador
- In office April 25, 2002 – July 31, 2011
- Preceded by: Elizabeth Marshall
- Succeeded by: Wayne Loveys (acting)

Personal details
- Born: Mount Pearl, Newfoundland and Labrador
- Spouse: Sharon Noseworthy
- Children: Jonathan Noseworthy

John L. Noseworthy is a Canadian accountant and politician who served as Auditor General of Newfoundland and Labrador from April 25, 2002, till July 30, 2011. Noseworthy was the Progressive Conservative Party of Newfoundland and Labrador candidate for the district of Signal Hill-Quidi Vidi in the October 2011 provincial election losing to New Democratic Party candidate Lorraine Michael.

Noseworthy began his career with government in 1981 as a senior auditor in the Department of the Auditor General. He held positions of auditor manager, audit principal and deputy auditor general. In April 2002, Premier Roger Grimes gave notice that he would move a motion in the House of Assembly appointing Noseworthy as successor to Beth Marshall, which subsequently passed.

Noseworthy is a past board member of the Council of the Institute of Chartered Accountants of Newfoundland and Labrador, past chair of the Canadian Council of Legislative Auditors Strategic Issues Group, and past chair of the Planning and Coordinating Committee of the Canadian Council of Legislative Auditors. In 2002 Noseworthy was awarded the Queen’s Golden Jubilee Medal for outstanding public service.

== Politics ==
On June 22, 2011, John Noseworthy announced via Twitter that he was retiring from his position as auditor general effective July 31, 2011, 13 months before his 10-year term as auditor general was up. His name was brought up as a candidate for the leadership of the Liberal Party of Newfoundland and Labrador upon the resignation of Yvonne Jones, but on August 8, 2011 he announced he was offered the job of Liberal leader but declined. On August 16, 2011, he announced he was seeking the Progressive Conservative Party nomination in the district of Signal Hill-Quidi Vidi for the October 2011 provincial election. On August 19, he was acclaimed as the party's candidate for the district, unsuccessfully challenging New Democratic Party leader Lorraine Michael.

=== Electoral record ===
Signal Hill-Quidi Vidi - 2011 Newfoundland and Labrador general election
Party	Candidate	Votes	%	±%
New Democratic	Lorraine Michael	3,239	65.28%	
Progressive Conservative	John Noseworthy	1,550	31.24%	–
Liberal	Drew Brown	173	3.49%	

== See also ==
- Auditor General of Newfoundland and Labrador
