= Topsail (electoral district) =

Former provincial electoral district in Newfoundland and Labrador, Canada

Newfoundland and Labrador electoral district
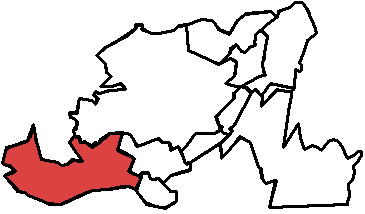
- Topsail in relation to other districts in St. John's

Defunct provincial electoral district
- Legislature: Newfoundland and Labrador House of Assembly
- District created: 1995
- First contested: 1996
- Last contested: 2011

Demographics
- Population (2006): 12,011
- Electors (2011): 11,080

Topsail is a defunct provincial electoral district for the House of Assembly of Newfoundland and Labrador, Canada. In 2011, there were 11,080 eligible voters living in the district. The district was abolished in 2015 and was mostly replaced by Topsail-Paradise. Parts of the riding were also redistributed into Mount Scio, Mount Pearl North, and Conception Bay South.

Topsail was located on the eastern shore of Conception Bay and included parts of the city of Mount Pearl and the towns of Conception Bay South and Paradise. The residential mix was suburban and sometimes rural, although many residents had commutes to St. John's.

Topsail was created in a 1995 redistribution, incorporating much of Conception Bay South and a small part of Mount Scio-Bell Island.

The 2007 redistribution changed the district significantly. Fifty-four per cent of it was retained, 32 per cent moved to Conception Bay South, 10 per cent moved to Mount Pearl North and four per cent shifted to Conception Bay East-Bell Island. The district also gained 16 per cent of both Waterford Valley and Conception Bay East-Bell Island. (CBC Electoral District Profile)

The district was represented by Liberal Ralph Wiseman, from the 1996 election until 2003. Wiseman was defeated by Progressive Conservative candidate Elizabeth Marshall in the 2003 general election, Marshall was re-elected in 2007 garnering 83% of the vote. In January 2010 Prime Minister Stephen Harper appointed Marshall to the Senate of Canada.

In the by-election held on March 16, 2010 Progressive Conservative candidate Paul Davis held on to the seat for the governing Tories, winning over 81% of the vote.

== Members of the House of Assembly ==
The district has elected the following members of the House of Assembly:

Assembly	Years	Member	Party
43rd	1996–1999	Ralph Wiseman	Liberal
43rd	1999–2003	Ralph Wiseman	Liberal
44th	2003–2007	Elizabeth Marshall	Progressive Conservative
45th	2007–2010	Elizabeth Marshall	Progressive Conservative
45th	2010–2011	Paul Davis	Progressive Conservative
46th	2011–2015	Paul Davis	Progressive Conservative

== Election results ==
2011 Newfoundland and Labrador general election
Party	Candidate	Votes	%	±%
Progressive Conservative	Paul Davis	3,860	68.35	-14.69
NDP	Brian Nolan	1,507	26.69	+18.44
Liberal	Nic Reid	280	4.96	-3.75
Total valid votes		5,647	99.86	–
Total rejected ballots		8	0.14	-0.10
Turnout		5,655	49.85	-9.64
Eligible voters		11,345		
Progressive Conservative hold		Swing		-16.56

^ Change is from 2007

}

By-Election - March 16, 2010 On the Senate appointment of Elizabeth Marshall, January 29, 2010
Party	Candidate	Votes	%	±%
Progressive Conservative	Paul Davis	2,737	81.73	-1.32
NDP	Brian Nolan	374	11.17	+2.92
Liberal	Shane Kennedy	238	7.11	-1.60
Total valid votes		3,349	99.88	–
Total rejected ballots		4	0.12	-0.12
Turnout		3,353	32.91	-26.58
Eligible voters		10,188		
Progressive Conservative hold		Swing		-2.12

2007 Newfoundland and Labrador general election
Party	Candidate	Votes	%	±%
Progressive Conservative	Elizabeth Marshall	4,892	83.04	+17.59
Liberal	Cynthia Layden-Barron	513	8.71	-20.07
NDP	Kyle Rees	486	8.25	+2.48
Total valid votes		5,891	99.76	–
Total rejected ballots		14	0.24	+0.04
Turnout		5,905	59.49	-21.04
Eligible voters		9,926		
Progressive Conservative hold		Swing		+18.83

2003 Newfoundland and Labrador general election
Party	Candidate	Votes	%	±%
Progressive Conservative	Elizabeth Marshall	5,354	65.45	+26.37
Liberal	Ralph Wiseman	2,354	28.78	-23.38
NDP	Mike Kehoe	472	5.77	-2.99
Total valid votes		8,180	99.80	–
Total rejected ballots		16	0.20	-0.02
Turnout		8,196	80.53	+0.75
Eligible voters		10,178		
Progressive Conservative gain from Liberal		Swing		+24.88

1999 Newfoundland and Labrador general election
Party	Candidate	Votes	%	±%
Liberal	Ralph Wiseman	3,381	52.16	-2.56
Progressive Conservative	Rick Fifield	2,533	39.08	-6.21
NDP	Mary Snow	568	8.76	
Total valid votes		6,482	99.78	
Total rejected ballots		14	0.22	-0.23
Turnout		6,496	79.77	+0.64
Eligible voters		8,143		
Liberal hold		Swing		+1.83

1996 Newfoundland and Labrador general election
Party	Candidate	Votes	%
Liberal	Ralph Wiseman	3,510	54.72
Progressive Conservative	Dianne Whalen	2,905	45.28
Total valid votes		6,415	99.55
Total rejected ballots		29	0.45
Turnout		6,444	79.14
Eligible voters		8,143	
Source: Elections Newfoundland and Labrador

== See also ==
- List of Newfoundland and Labrador provincial electoral districts
- Canadian provincial electoral districts

Newfoundland and Labrador House of Assembly
Preceded by Humber East	Constituency represented by the premier of Newfoundland and Labrador; 2014-2015	Succeeded by Humber-Gros Morne
