= Wallace House (politician) =

Canadian politician

H. Wallace House (1929 – February 3, 1985) was an educator and politician in Newfoundland. He represented Humber Valley in the Newfoundland House of Assembly from 1975 to 1985.

He was born in Bellburns and was educated there, at Memorial University and at Boston University. His career in education in Newfoundland lasted twenty years; he was a teacher and principal and served as superintendent of education for the Deer Lake Integrated School Board. He also was president for various local branches of the Newfoundland Teachers' Association and president of the Regional Administrators Association.

House was elected to the Deer Lake town council in 1969, and served as mayor from 1969 to 1975. He was a founding member of the Deer Lake Public Health Corporation and served as its secretary and treasurer. House was elected to the Newfoundland assembly in 1975; he was reelected in 1979 and 1982. He served in the provincial cabinet as Minister of Education, as Minister of Labour and Manpower and as Minister of Health.

House died in office in 1985.

== Electoral record ==
Humber Valley - 1982 Newfoundland and Labrador general election
Party	Candidate	Votes	%	±%
Progressive Conservative	Wallace House	3,480	63.53%	+10.89
Liberal	Kevin Saunders	1,998	36.47%	+0.32

Humber Valley - 1979 Newfoundland and Labrador general election
Party	Candidate	Votes	%	±%
Progressive Conservative	Wallace House	2,465	52.64%	-0.39
Liberal	Kevin Saunders	1,723	36.79%	–
New Democratic	Allan Harvey French	495	10.57%	–

Humber Valley - Newfoundland and Labrador general election, 1975
Party	Candidate	Votes	%	±%
Progressive Conservative	Wallace House	2,221	53.03%	–
Liberal	Stanley Earl Parsons	902	21.54%	–
Reform Liberal	Alex John Wiseman	865	20.65%	–
Independent	Kenneth R.J. Prowse	200	4.78%	–
