= Nathaniel Noel =

Canadian politician, journalist and educator

Nathaniel Stewart Noel (November 29, 1920 – 2006) was a lawyer, judge and politician in Newfoundland and Labrador. He represented St. John's North in the Newfoundland House of Assembly from 1966 to 1971.

The son of Thomas C. Noel and Flora M. Winsor, he was born in St. John's, Newfoundland and Labrador and was educated at Bishop Feild College, Memorial University College and Dalhousie University. Noel served overseas with the 59th (Newfoundland) Heavy Artillery Regiment during World War II. He was called to the Newfoundland bar in 1949 and practised law in St. John's.

Noel married Olga Thistle; the couple had three children.

He was elected to the Newfoundland assembly in 1966; he did not run for reelection in 1971. In 1973, he was named to the Trial division of the Supreme Court of Newfoundland.

Noel died in 2006.
