= Auditor General of Newfoundland and Labrador =

Canadian Provincial government accountability agency

The Auditor General of Newfoundland and Labrador is appointed by the Lieutenant-Governor in Council and confirmed by a resolution of the House of Assembly

The Auditor General Act creates the Office of the Auditor General to assist in carrying out the duties prescribed. The Act appoints the Auditor General as the House of Assembly's independent legislative auditor of Government, its departments, agencies of the Crown, and Crown controlled corporations. The Auditor General reports to the House of Assembly, on significant matters which result from the examination of these entities.

The Act also appoints the Auditor General as the auditor of the accounts and financial statements of the Province. This results in an opinion as to the fair presentation of these financial statements. In addition, the Auditor General is the auditor of the financial statements of a number of agencies of the Crown and issues a separate report for each of these agencies as to the fair presentation of their financial statements.

== History ==
The Office of the Auditor General has a long history in Newfoundland. The first Comptroller and Auditor General, F.C. Berteau, was appointed in 1898. In his 1898-99 Report for the Colony of Newfoundland, Berteau made the following comment relating to the role of Auditor General:

" I take it that the duties of an Auditor General do not stop at the checking and overseeing of the Public Accounts. They go further; he should note where and how alterations making for economy and the better management of the Public Funds can be effected without injury to the efficiency of the several services."

== Role of the Auditor General ==
The Auditor General Act, which was assented to on 31 October 1991, determines the role of the Auditor General. Implicit in the Act is the requirement for the Auditor General to provide the House of Assembly with timely, relevant information, necessary to enhance public sector accountability and performance.

The Auditor General's fundamental role is to bring an independent audit and reporting process to bear upon the manner in which Government and its various entities discharge their responsibilities and report on their planned programs and their use of public resources. This role of the Auditor General is superimposed on the accountability relationship which exists between all levels of Government through to the House of Assembly.

To fulfil its legislated mandate, the Office of the Auditor General has a staff of approximately 36, with 32 staff at the head office in St. John's and 4 staff at its Corner Brook branch. The Office is responsible for auditing financial statements and other accountability documents, evaluating management practices and control systems, and determining compliance with legislative and other authorities. Eighty-percent of audit staff hold professional accounting designations. The staff with their extensive experience in legislative auditing is one of the Office's greatest assets.

On an annual basis the Auditor General examines the consolidated summary financial statements prepared by Government which include in the reporting entity certain organizations that are accountable for the administration of their financial affairs and resources either to a Minister of Government or directly to the Legislature, and that are owned or controlled by Government. The Auditor General also examines the statements of the Consolidated Revenue Fund of the Province which have been prepared by Government. Comments on these financial statements and comments on the reporting entity are included in a report prepared annually entitled Report of the Auditor General to the House of Assembly on the Audit of the Financial Statements of the Province.

The Auditor General is the auditor of the financial statements and accounts of the Province and makes those examinations considered necessary to report as required under the Auditor General Act. There are 18 departments, the Consolidated Fund Services and the Legislature, involved in the administration of the revenue and expenditure program.

The size and complexity of government operations prevent the audit of all programs and systems on an annual basis. Therefore, the Auditor General audits a selection of programs and systems each year designed to cover all significant operations on a cyclical basis.

The Auditor General is the auditor of the financial statements of certain agencies of the Crown. As part of these audits the Auditor General expresses an opinion on the financial statements and when appropriate, issues a management letter. This letter highlights certain matters which come to attention as a result of the audit and includes any recommendations for improvement. These audits are performed in accordance with the provisions of the various legislation which creates the entities.

Each year the Auditor General performs additional examinations of certain agencies of the Crown including those whose financial statement audits are performed by private sector auditors. These additional examinations are designed to review compliance with various legislation and to ensure that the entities have adequate systems of management control in place. The results of these examinations are disclosed in a report prepared annually entitled Report of the Auditor General to the House of Assembly on Reviews of Departments and Crown Agencies.

== About the Office of the Auditor General ==
As outlined in the Auditor General Act, the Auditor General's fundamental role is to bring an independent audit and reporting process to bear upon the manner in which Government and its various entities discharge their responsibilities, report on their planned programs and their use of public resources. The role of the Auditor General complements the accountability relationship which exists between Government, its departments, agencies of the Crown and the House of Assembly, as illustrated in Figure 1.

The Auditor General reports to the House of Assembly on significant matters which result from the examinations of Government, its departments and agencies of the Crown. The Auditor General is also the independent auditor of the Province's financial statements and the financial statements of many agencies of the Crown and, as such, expresses an opinion as to the fair presentation of their financial statements.

In addition to allocating our resources to perform the above audits, reviews, and examinations, we may also receive requests to complete special assignments. Under the Auditor General Act, these special assignments may be requested by the House of Assembly, the Public Accounts Committee or the Lieutenant-Governor in Council. In these special assignments, the Auditor General reports to whoever makes the request.

Section 12 of the Auditor General Act requires the Auditor General to report, at least annually, on:

- The work of the Office;
- Whether, in carrying out the work of the Office, the Auditor General received all the information including reports and explanations required;
- The results of the examination of the Province's financial statements;
- Audits, examinations and inquiries performed under the Act; and
- The results of the examination of the accounts of the Province calling attention to anything the Auditor General considers significant relating to:
- Collections of public money;
- Disbursements of public money;
- Instances where accounts have not been faithfully and properly kept;
- Instances where assets acquired, administered or otherwise held were not adequately safeguarded or accounted for;
- Instances where accounting systems and management control systems that relate to revenue, disbursements, the safeguarding or use of assets or the determination of liabilities were not in existence, were inadequate or had not been complied with; and
- Any factors or circumstances relating to an expenditure of public money which in opinion of the Auditor General should be brought to the attention of the House of Assembly

== Expertise in public sector matters ==
"As a result of working exclusively in the public sector, Legislative Auditors have said to acquired extensive corporate and operational knowledge of Government. They are specialists in the field of public sector auditing and their credibility with legislators (for example, on topics such as emerging public sector trends and accountability issues) is thus well established. Given their extensive interaction with legislators, Legislative Auditors are in the notable position of being aware of, and understanding legislators' concerns".

"Furthermore, having a whole-of-Government mandate has allowed Legislative Auditors to speak to legislators about broad Government matters and to better identify those accountability and performance issues that have the greatest impact on Government. As a consequence, Legislative Auditors are better able to promote consistency of accounting across government organizations, and to make informed decisions about the selection, conduct and reporting of audits".

== See also ==
- John Noseworthy (Canadian politician)
