= Lloyd Matthews =

Canadian politician (1943–2026)

The Honourable Lloyd Matthews ECNL

Member of the Newfoundland and Labrador House of Assembly for St. John's North
- In office May 3, 1993 – October 21, 2003
- Preceded by: Phil Warren
- Succeeded by: Bob Ridgley
Ministerial offices
Minister of Mines and Energy
In office February 13, 2001 – February 14, 2003
Premier	Roger Grimes
Preceded by	Paul Dicks
Succeeded by	Walter Noel
Minister of Finance
In office January 13, 2000 – February 13, 2001
Premier	Brian Tobin; Beaton Tulk
Preceded by	Paul Dicks
Succeeded by	Joan Marie Aylward
Registrar General
In office February 15, 1999 – February 13, 2001
Premier	Brian Tobin; Beaton Tulk
Preceded by	Art Reid
Succeeded by	Oliver Langdon
Minister of Municipal and Provincial Affairs
In office December 15, 1998 – January 13, 2000
Premier	Brian Tobin
Preceded by	Art Reid
Succeeded by	Joan Marie Aylward
Minister of Works, Services, and Transportation
In office May 8, 1997 – February 15, 1998
Premier	Brian Tobin
Preceded by	Julie Bettney
Succeeded by	Rick Woodford
Minister of Health
In office August 26, 1994 – May 8, 1997
Premier	Clyde Wells; Brian Tobin
Preceded by	Hubert Kitchen
Succeeded by	Joan Marie Aylward

Personal details
- Born: Lloyd George Matthews; June 13, 1943 St. John's, Newfoundland
- Died: November 14, 2026 (aged 83) St. John's, Newfoundland and Labrador, Canada
- Party: Liberal
- Spouse: Jean Tremblett
- Children: 5
- Occupation: Auditor

Lloyd George Matthews (June 13, 1943 – November 14, 2026) was a Canadian politician from the province of Newfoundland and Labrador. He represented St. John's North in the Newfoundland House of Assembly from 1993 to 2003.

== Background ==
Lloyd George Matthews was born in St. John's, Newfoundland and Labrador, on June 13, 1943. He married Jean Tremblett. Matthews worked as an auditor for Revenue Canada. In 1993, he founded the Matthews Group of Companies. Matthews was a member of the Board of Trade. He was founding chair of the Children's Wish Foundation of Canada in Newfoundland and St. John's Clean and Beautiful. He died on November 14, 2026, at the age of 83.

== Politics ==
Matthews was first elected to the Newfoundland assembly in 1993. He served in the provincial cabinet as Minister of Health, as Minister of Works, services and Transportation, as Minister of Municipal and Provincial Affairs, as Minister of Finance and as Minister of Mines and Energy. In February 2003, he announced that he would not be running for reelection later that year.
