= Bob Ridgley =

Canadian politician

Member of the Newfoundland and Labrador House of Assembly for St. John's North
- In office 2003 – September 19, 2011
- Preceded by: Lloyd Matthews
- Succeeded by: Dale Kirby

Personal details
- Party: Progressive Conservative
- Occupation: Businessman, educator

Bob Ridgley is a Canadian politician. He represented the district of St. John's North in the Newfoundland and Labrador House of Assembly as a member of the Progressive Conservative Party from 2003 to 2011. He was defeated in the 2011 provincial election.
