= Ed Byrne (Canadian politician) =

Canadian politician (born 1963)

Leader of the Progressive Conservative Party of Newfoundland and Labrador
- In office 1998–2001
- Preceded by: Loyola Sullivan
- Succeeded by: Danny Williams

Government House Leader, Minister of Natural Resources, Minister of Forest resources and Agrifoods, And Minister of Mines and Energy
- In office November 6, 2003 – June 21, 2006
- Preceded by: Walter Noel
- Succeeded by: Kathy Dunderdale

MHA for Kilbride
- In office 1993–2007
- Preceded by: Bob Aylward
- Succeeded by: John Dinn

Personal details
- Born: 1963 (age 62–63)
- Party: Progressive Conservative
- Occupation: Politician

Edward J. Byrne (born 1963) is a former Canadian politician, formerly a member of the Newfoundland and Labrador House of Assembly. He served as leader of the Progressive Conservative Party of Newfoundland and Labrador and opposition leader from 1998 to 2001. When the Conservatives came to power in 2003, he was named Minister of Natural Resources and Government House Leader, being considered the second-most powerful politician in the province after Premier Danny Williams.

Byrne was forced to step down from cabinet in 2006 after it was revealed that he and several other legislators had exceeded their constituency allowance claims, which led to a criminal investigation. He resigned from the Assembly at the end of that year. In 2009, he was convicted of defrauding the Crown of in excess of CAD$100,000 and influence peddling (known more formally in Newfoundland and Labrador as fraud against the government).

== Early career and rise in politics ==
Byrne studied at Memorial University of Newfoundland where towards a joint Bachelor of Arts / Bachelor of Education program majoring conjointly in Newfoundland Studies and Religious Studies. In 1984, he was elected President of the university's Council of the Students’ Union.

He began his career as an adult educator specializing in curriculum development and serving as a skills training coordinator, and he went on to serve as Administrator of the Atlantic Labour Training Trust Fund. For five years, as well, he served as a management consultant.

He wed the daughter of Gerry Ottenheimer, who was then serving as the Deputy-Speaker of the Senate of Canada. Subsequently, Byrne was elected to represent the district of Kilbride in the provincial elections of 1993, 1996, 1999 and 2003. As a Progressive Conservative Member of the House of Assembly, he served in several shadow portfolios including Post-secondary Education, Employment and Labour Relations, Environment, and Industry, Trade and Technology; and as Chair of the Public Accounts Committee.

He served as Leader of the Progressive Conservative Party and Leader of the Opposition from 1998 to 2001. In the 1999 provincial election the PCs increased their seats from 9 to 14. He stepped aside in 2001 to allow St. John's businessman Danny Williams to assume the leadership. Williams and the Progressive Conservatives then went on to win the 2003 provincial election.

Byrne was appointed as the Minister of the Departments of Mines and Energy and Forest Resources and Agrifoods (now known collectively as the Department of Natural Resources) and Government House Leader on November 6, 2003, by Williams, positions he held until June 21, 2006.

== Constituency allowance scandal ==
On June 21, 2006, Williams announced that he had requested Byrne's resignation as a result of an audit of the financial records of the House of Assembly by the Auditor General of the province. Byrne was forced to step down after the Auditor General expressed concern to the Speaker of the House of Assembly over financial issues. Byrne left cabinet that day.

On June 22, 2006, the provincial Auditor General released a report on Byrne's constituency allowance claims in the 2003 and 2004 fiscal years. While Byrne had been eligible for a maximum claim of $31,500 for that period, the Auditor General had found evidence that he had claimed a total of $326,642 in excess of that amount. The Auditor General recommended that the case be turned over to the Department of Justice for review.

The Auditor General also reported, on June 22, that three other members of the House of Assembly were being investigated for similar actions, one former Liberal member, one sitting Liberal member, and one sitting New Democratic Party member. The finance director of the Assembly, Bill Murray, was also suspended. As the scandal involved all political parties, the Conservatives did not suffer a backlash in the 2007 election and actually increased their share of the popular vote and seat count.

On June 23, the Royal Newfoundland Constabulary began a criminal investigation based on the findings of the Auditor General. Byrne, three other Newfoundland politicians and a senior civil servant in the House of Assembly were subsequently indicted under the Criminal Code of Canada, on fraud-related offenses.

On November 28, 2006, Byrne announced his resignation from provincial politics, effective January 1, 2007.

=== Trial and conviction ===
Upon his arraignment in front of Provincial Court Associate Chief Judge D. Mark Pike, Byrne pleaded guilty to both criminal charges laid against him: fraud in excess of $5,000 and fraud against the government (influence peddling). On April 17, 2009, Judge Pike sentenced Byrne to two-years-less-a-day on the count of fraud in excess of $5,000, and eighteen months on the count of fraud against the government, with both sentences being served concurrently. Byrne was further ordered to repay CAD$117,812 to the Crown. Byrne served his prison sentence at Her Majesty's Penitentiary's (Bishop's Falls Correctional Centre).

In his sentencing decision, the Judge noted that "The most aggravating factor to be considered is that this fraud and bribery was committed by someone who was in a high position of public trust. When officials enrich themselves or others in circumstances such as this, there is an undermining of the confidence in the democratic system ... Byrne used his position to carry out these fraudulent and corrupt activities." The Judge noted two significant mitigating factors in his decision: first, that Byrne's marriage had broken down (and his family life dramatically affected); and, second, that having been convicted of an offense against Her Majesty, Byrne may never again be employed in or by the Public Sector (i.e., any government body under the authority of Her Majesty anywhere in Canada). The judge nonetheless largely agreed with the prosecution's request for two years imprisonment, citing the need to send a message of deterrence given the serious nature of Byrne's fraud. The judge rejected the defence's suggestion for a conditional sentence as too lenient, despite considering Byrne as not considered a danger to society if he was released due to his high-profile.

== Arrest and sentencing for impaired driving ==
Byrne was arrested in April 2008, after he ran a red light while driving in St. John's. At the time of his arrest, Byrne's blood alcohol level was three times the legal limit. On April 28, 2009, Byrne pleaded guilty to a charge of failing a breathalyzer (a charge of impaired driving was dropped). His licence was suspended for 18 months, and he was fined $920. Byrne was incarcerated on fraud and corruption charges, at the time of the court hearing for impaired driving and was not present for the sentencing.

Byrne had a prior conviction for impaired driving in 1991.
