= Phil Warren (politician) =

Canadian educator and politician

The Honourable Phil Warren OC ECNL

MHA For St. John's North
- In office 1989–1993
- Preceded by: John Carter
- Succeeded by: Lloyd Matthews

Minister of Education
- In office May 5, 1989 – July 19, 1992
- Preceded by: Loyola Hearn
- Succeeded by: Chris Decker

Personal details
- Born: 1933 (age 92–93)

Philip John Warren (born 1933) is an educator and former politician in Newfoundland. He represented St. John's North in the Newfoundland House of Assembly from 1989 to 1993.

The son of Willis and Eunice Warren, he was born in New Perlican and was educated there, at Memorial University and at the University of Alberta. Warren married Marie Brown. Before entering politics, he worked as a teacher and school principal. Warren taught at the University of Calgary. In 1962, he became part of the educational administration department at Memorial University; from 1968 to 1973, he was department head. In 1964, he was named chair for a Royal Commission on Education and Youth. He was named to the Canadian College of Teachers in 1974. Warren became a life member of both the Newfoundland Teachers' Association and the Canadian Education Association.

In 1980, he became president of the provincial Liberal party. Warren was elected to the Newfoundland assembly in 1989 after two previous unsuccessful attempts. He served in the provincial cabinet as Minister of Education, resigning from cabinet in 1993. Warren did not run for reelection.

In 2002, he was named an Officer in the Order of Canada.
