= Grand Falls-Windsor-Buchans =

Provincial electoral district in Newfoundland and Labrador, Canada

Newfoundland and Labrador electoral district
- Grand Falls-Windsor-Buchans in relation to other districts in Newfoundland

Provincial electoral district
- Legislature: Newfoundland and Labrador House of Assembly
MHA
Chris Tibbs
Progressive Conservative
- District created: 2006
- First contested: 2007
- Last contested: 2025

Demographics
- Population (2006): 9,924
- Electors (2011): 7,450

Grand Falls-Windsor—Buchans is a provincial electoral district for the House of Assembly of Newfoundland and Labrador, Canada. Prior to 2006, the district was Grand Falls-Buchans, while expanded slightly in all directions it took in no major municipalities. In 2011, there were 7,450 eligible voters living within the district.

In the heart of central Newfoundland. Includes part of the town of Grand Falls-Windsor to the north and stretches westward. Badger, Buchans, Buchans Junction, Crooked Lake, Millertown and Red Indian Lake are in the district. Forestry and mining are major industries.

== Members of the House of Assembly ==
The district has elected the following members of the House of Assembly:

Assembly	Years	Member	Party
Grand Falls
29th	1949–1951	Edward S. Spencer	Liberal
30th	1951–1956	Edward S. Spencer	Liberal
31st	1956–1959	Edward S. Spencer	Liberal
32nd	1959–1962	Raymond W. Guy	Liberal
33rd	1962–1966	Ambrose Peddle	Progressive Conservative
34th	1966–1971	Frederick W. Rowe	Liberal
35th	1971	Aubrey Senior	Progressive Conservative
36th	1972–1975	Aubrey Senior	Progressive Conservative
37th	1975–1979	John Lundrigan	Progressive Conservative
38th	1979–1982	Len Simms	Progressive Conservative
39th	1982–1985	Len Simms	Progressive Conservative
40th	1985–1989	Len Simms	Progressive Conservative
41st	1989–1993	Len Simms	Progressive Conservative
42nd	1993–1995	Len Simms	Progressive Conservative
42nd	1995–1996	Mike Mackey	Progressive Conservative
Grand Falls - Buchans
43rd	1996–1999	Anna Thistle	Liberal
44th	1999–2003	Anna Thistle	Liberal
45th	2003–2007	Anna Thistle	Liberal
Grand Falls - Windsor - Buchans
46th	2007–2011	Susan Sullivan	Progressive Conservative
47th	2011–2015	Susan Sullivan	Progressive Conservative
48th	2015–2019	Al Hawkins	Liberal
49th	2019–2021	Chris Tibbs	Progressive Conservative
50th	2021–2025	Chris Tibbs	Progressive Conservative
51st	2025–present	Chris Tibbs	Progressive Conservative

== Election results ==
=== Results as Grand Falls—Windsor—Buchans ===
View source data.

Minor parties with a consistent vote share below 2% are omitted

2025 Newfoundland and Labrador general election
Party	Candidate	Votes	%	±%
Progressive Conservative	Chris Tibbs	3,408	59.0%	
Liberal	Barry Manuel	2,144	37.1%	
New Democratic	Liz Noseworthy	229	4.0/5	
Total valid votes				
Total rejected ballots				
Turnout				
Eligible voters				
Progressive Conservative hold		Swing		+

2021 Newfoundland and Labrador general election
Party	Candidate	Votes	%	±%
Progressive Conservative	Chris Tibbs	2,735	59.24	+6.08
Liberal	Debbie Ball	1,776	38.47	-8.37
New Democratic	Holly Pike	106	2.30	
Total valid votes		4,617		
Total rejected ballots				
Turnout				
Eligible voters				
Progressive Conservative hold		Swing		-7.23
Source(s) "Officially Nominated Candidates General Election 2021" (PDF). Elections Newfoundland and Labrador. "NL Election 2021 (Unofficial Results)".

2019 Newfoundland and Labrador general election
Party	Candidate	Votes	%	±%
Progressive Conservative	Chris Tibbs	2,935	53.16	+29.54
Liberal	Al Hawkins	2,586	46.84	-6.71
Total valid votes		5,521	98.71	
Total rejected ballots		72	1.29	+0.23
Turnout		5,593	60.75	+6.11
Eligible voters		9,207		
Progressive Conservative gain from Liberal		Swing		+18.13

2015 Newfoundland and Labrador general election
Party	Candidate	Votes	%	±%
Liberal	Al Hawkins	2,607	53.55%	+21.46
Progressive Conservative	Mark Whiffen	1,150	23.62%	-38.00
Independent	Rex Barnes	962	19.76%	
New Democratic	Meghan Keating	149	3.06%	-3.23
Total valid votes		4,868	100.0	

2011 Newfoundland and Labrador general election
Party	Candidate	Votes	%	±%
Progressive Conservative	Susan Sullivan	2,957	61.62%	-10.21
Liberal	Wayne Morris	1,540	32.09%	+27.86
New Democratic	John Whelan	302	6.29%	-17.64
Total valid votes		4,799	100.0	

2007 general election, November 6, 2007
Party	Candidate	Votes	%	±%
Progressive Conservative	Susan Sullivan	2,767	71.83	
NDP	Junior C. Downey	922	23.93	
Liberal	John J. Woodrow	163	4.23	

=== Results as Grand Falls—Buchans ===
2003 Newfoundland and Labrador general election
Party	Candidate	Votes	%	+/-
Liberal	Anna Thistle	3,921		
Progressive Conservative	Paula Flood	2,331		
NDP	Gerry Tobin	370		

1999 Newfoundland and Labrador general election
Party	Candidate	Votes	%	+/-
Liberal	Anna Thistle	3,551		
Progressive Conservative	Lorne Woolridge	2,349		
NDP	Bob Buckingham	188		

1996 Newfoundland and Labrador general election
Party	Candidate	Votes	%	±%
Liberal	Anna Thistle	3,441		
Progressive Conservative	Mike Mackey	2,321	–	–
NDP	Joe Tremblett	1,087		

=== Results as Grand Falls ===
1993 Newfoundland and Labrador general election
Party	Candidate	Votes	%	±%
Progressive Conservative	Len Simms	3,470	–	–
Liberal	Edward Langdon	1,421		
NDP	John Mackey	297		

1989 Newfoundland and Labrador general election
Party	Candidate	Votes	%	±%
Progressive Conservative	Len Simms	3,400	64.9	–
Liberal	Jim Hornell	1,841	35.1	

1985 Newfoundland and Labrador general election
Party	Candidate	Votes	%	±%
Progressive Conservative	Len Simms	2,208	44.3	–
NDP	Bryan Blackmore	2,167	43.4	
Liberal	George Anderson	615	12.3	

1982 Newfoundland and Labrador general election
Party	Candidate	Votes	%	±%
Progressive Conservative	Leonard Simms	2,786	70.7	–
Liberal	Walter Clarke	1,153	29.3	

1979 Newfoundland and Labrador general election
Party	Candidate	Votes	%	±%
Progressive Conservative	Len Simms	2,556	58.7	–
Liberal	Roger Grimes	1,346	30.9	
NDP	Andrew Barker	449	3.8	

== See also ==
- List of Newfoundland and Labrador provincial electoral districts
- Canadian provincial electoral districts
