= Dwight Ball =

Canadian politician

The Honourable Dwight Ball ECNL
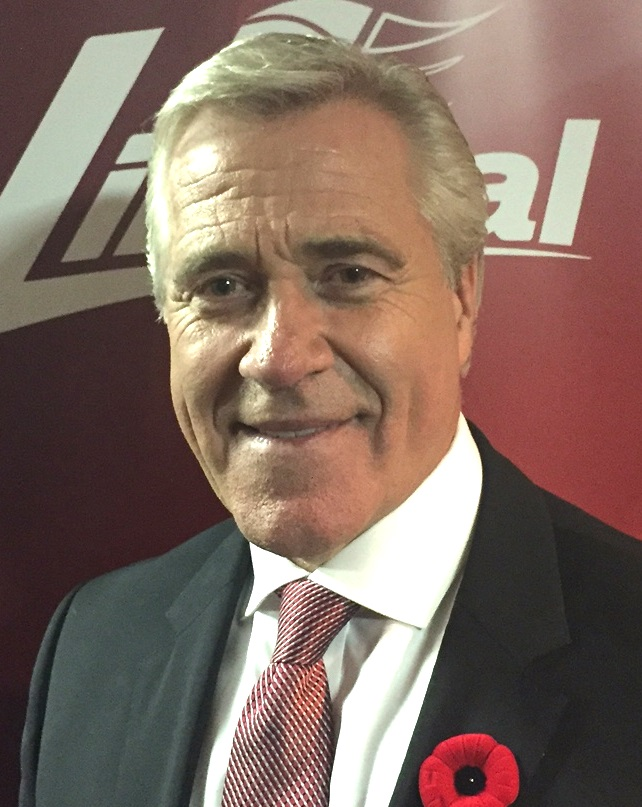
- Ball in 2016

13th Premier of Newfoundland and Labrador
- In office 14 December 2015 – 19 August 2020
- Monarch: Elizabeth II
- Lieutenant Governor: Frank Fagan; Judy Foote
- Preceded by: Paul Davis
- Succeeded by: Andrew Furey

Minister of Intergovernmental and Indigenous Affairs
- In office 8 November 2018 – 19 August 2020
- Preceded by: position established
- Succeeded by: position abolished

Minister Responsible for Labrador Affairs
- In office 8 November 2018 – 19 August 2020
- Preceded by: position established
- Succeeded by: Lisa Dempster

Minister of Labrador and Aboriginal Affairs
- In office 14 December 2015 – 8 November 2018
- Preceded by: Keith Russell
- Succeeded by: position abolished

Leader of the Opposition (Newfoundland and Labrador)
- In office 17 November 2013 – 14 December 2015
- Preceded by: Eddie Joyce
- Succeeded by: Paul Davis
- In office 3 January 2012 – 18 July 2013
- Preceded by: Yvonne Jones
- Succeeded by: Eddie Joyce

Leader of the Liberal Party
- In office 17 November 2013 – 3 August 2020
- Preceded by: Kevin Aylward (2012); Eddie Joyce (interim) (2013)
- Succeeded by: Andrew Furey

Member of the Newfoundland and Labrador House of Assembly for Humber-Gros Morne Humber Valley (2007, 2011-2015)
- In office 30 November 2015 – 7 September 2020
- Preceded by: district established
- Succeeded by: Andrew Furey
- In office 11 October 2011 – 30 November 2015
- Preceded by: Darryl Kelly
- Succeeded by: district abolished
- In office 13 February 2007 – 9 October 2007
- Preceded by: Kathy Goudie
- Succeeded by: Darryl Kelly

Personal details
- Born: 21 December 1957 (age 68) Deer Lake, Newfoundland, Canada
- Party: Liberal
- Profession: Pharmacist

Dwight Ball (born December 21, 1957) is a Canadian politician who was the 13th premier of Newfoundland and Labrador from 14 December 2015, to 19 August 2020, and an MHA. He represented the electoral district of Humber Valley in the Newfoundland and Labrador House of Assembly, and was the leader of the Liberal Party from 17 November 2013 to 3 August 2020.

On 3 January 2012, Ball began his duties as Leader of the Official Opposition and interim leader of the Liberal Party. On 5 July 2013, Ball stepped down as interim leader of the Liberal Party to run for the position permanently in the 2013 leadership election, which he won. He was sworn in on 14 December 2015.

On 30 November 2015, Ball won a 31-seat majority government in the 2015 election. The Ball government was re-elected to a minority government in 2019.

On 17 February 2020, Ball announced his pending resignation. Following a virtual convention on 3 August—held in part due to the ongoing COVID-19 pandemic—Ball was succeeded by Andrew Furey, who assumed the premiership on 19 August 2020.

== Early life and career ==
Dwight Ball was raised in Deer Lake, Newfoundland and Labrador, and graduated from Elwood Regional High School. He attended Memorial University when he was 17 years old. His younger brother is Deer Lake's mayor Dean Ball.

Ball was the recipient of the Bowl of Hygeia Award for his work as a community pharmacist that began with his franchising of the Deer Lake Pharmacy. Ball later bought a community pharmacy in Springdale. Ball is also the owner of several senior care homes and is involved in real estate development and venture capital investments. The towns of Deer Lake and Springdale have independently both named Ball as Employer of the Year for his contributions to supportive employment programs in the area.

== Politics ==
Ball was the Liberal candidate in the district of Humber Valley in the 2003 provincial election, but was defeated by Progressive Conservative candidate Kathy Goudie by less than 200 votes. When Goudie resigned from the legislature, Ball ran in a by-election to succeed her on 13 February 2007. At first, it was announced that Progressive Conservative candidate Darryl Kelly had won the by-election by a margin of twelve votes; however, Ball was later declared elected by a margin of 18 votes. A judicial recount was conducted weeks later and resulted in a reduction of Ball's lead to seven votes. In a rematch in the general election on 9 October 2007, Kelly defeated Ball by 254 votes. Four years later Ball once again ran as the Liberal candidate in the 2011 election and this time narrowly defeated Kelly by 68 votes.

=== Leadership ===
At a press conference on 15 December 2011, the Liberal Party announced that Ball would serve as interim leader of the party and as the Leader of the Official Opposition, effective 3 January 2012. He succeeds Kevin Aylward, who failed to win a seat in the general election, as leader of the Liberal Party and Yvonne Jones as the Official Opposition Leader. Ball announced on the same day that he planned to run for the permanent leadership of the party at the next leadership convention, and that he would step down as interim leader 90 days before the convention to even the playing field for other candidates. In May 2012, the party announced the leadership convention would take place from 15 to 17 November 2013. On 5 July 2013, Ball stepped down as interim leader of the Liberal Party to run for the position permanently in the leadership election that November, which he won with 59% of the vote on the 3rd ballot. Ball served as leader for the party in the 2015 general election.

== Premiership (2015–2020) ==
Ball was sworn in as Premier on 14 December 2015, after leading the Liberal Party to win 31 of 40 seats in the House of Assembly in the election in November.

Despite consistent Progressive Conservative leads in polling through the debate, including a 9-point lead in the final poll, released a day before the election, The Liberal Party led by Dwight Ball won re-election in the 2019 provincial election, but nonetheless fell one seat short of retaining their majority after an unexpected loss to the New Democrats in Labrador West by 5 votes.

On 17 February 2020, Premier Ball announced his resignation as Premier and Leader of the Liberal Party. On 3 August 2020, Andrew Furey was chosen to succeed Ball after winning the provincial Liberal leadership race.

=== Minister of Labrador and Aboriginal Affairs ===
Ball took over the post of Minister of Labrador and Aboriginal Affairs from PC Keith Russell after the election in 2015. This decision was somewhat controversial as none of the Aboriginal MHAs from Labrador were appointed to Ball's cabinet and Ball was neither from Labrador or an Aboriginal, however, the move was supported by NunatuKavut president and former Labrador MP Todd Russell.

=== Inquiries ===
In December 2015, it was announced that public inquiries into the deaths of Don Dunphy (a man from Mitchells Brook who was shot dead by a police officer after posting content on Twitter that was deemed a "security threat".) and Burton Winters (a teenager from Makkovik who got lost by himself outside of his community and died of hypothermia while a search helicopter did not arrive until 52 hours later.) would take place. The Dunphy inquiry took place during Ball's term; however the Winters inquiry did not.

In 2017, Premier Ball called a public inquiry into the Muskrat Falls project which took place between 2018 and 2020. In the inquiry report Commissioner Richard LeBlanc concluded the government failed its duty to residents by predetermining that the megaproject would proceed no matter what. In his report, LeBlanc concluded that the business case, which assumed the Muskrat Falls project was the lowest-cost power option, was "questionable." LeBlanc stated that the project’s economics were not sufficiently tested and that Nalcor failed to consider all potentially viable power options. LeBlanc stated that Nalcor concealed information that could have undermined the business case for the project from the public and government.

=== 2016-17 budget ===
The provincial government unveiled its budget in April 2016 which implemented austerity measures. Ball and Minister of Finance Cathy Bennett do not expect the province to see another surplus until 2022.

Anti-austerity protests took place across the province in areas like St. John's, Corner Brook, Grand Falls-Windsor and Happy Valley-Goose Bay.

=== Natural resources ===
==== Ed Martin scandal ====
In early 2016, Nalcor Energy CEO Ed Martin left the company. Ball and Martin each claim that Martin left under conflicting circumstances.

==== Lower Churchill Project ====
The cost of the Lower Churchill Project has doubled since it started development nearly a decade before Ball took office. The province's financial situation was different when the project started development, the price of oil was high (Newfoundland and Labrador is an oil-producing province), however, the price of oil and the value of the Canadian dollar has gone down since. Ball has blamed the governments of Danny Williams and Kathy Dunderdale for the number of problems that the project has caused.

In 2016, researchers from Harvard University found that methylmercury levels in fish would rise as a result of the project. After protests led by Indigenous groups in Central Labrador in 2016, an Agreement was reached by Labrador’s three Indigenous groups (Nunatsiavut Government, Innu Nation and the NunatuKavut Community Council) and the Government of Newfoundland and Labrador outlining the establishment of an independent committee to make recommendations on mitigating potential impacts of methylmercury on human health from the Lower Churchill Project at Muskrat Falls, Labrador. In 2018, the committee recommended — among other things — wetland capping to stem the release of methylmercury.

During the Muskrat Falls inquiry in 2019, it was revealed the provincial government wouldn't be completing wetland capping at the Muskrat Falls reservoir as previously planned. The $30 million designated for the capping was split up and offered to all three Indigenous governments with the Innu Nation and NunatuKavut accepting. Nalcor had applied for a permit in July 2018 to carry out the approximately 13 hectares of wetland capping — essentially pouring sand and stone over a small area of wetland near the reservoir — but the permit was never approved by the Department of Municipal Affairs and Environment. Ball later said wetland capping would have only decreased methylmercury levels by two per cent.

=== Popularity ===
During the 2015 election campaign Ball's Liberals usually saw public approval ratings well over 50%. His party earned 57.2% of the votes in the election. In February 2016, a poll showed that 60% of respondents approved of Ball's work as premier.

The 2016-17 budget had a huge impact on Ball's public approval. A poll from MQO Research in April 2016 showed a near tie in support for all 3 parties, a huge difference from a few months earlier when Ball's liberals had far more support than the other 2 parties. Combined with the scandal involving Ed Martin, Ball's public support has dropped at a fast rate since the election. A poll in May 2016 showed that Ball was the least popular head of government in the country with a 17% approval rating. The second lowest score was Ontario's Kathleen Wynne with 24%.

An online petition calling for Ball's resignation went viral in June 2016, but Ball has stated that he will not resign and he also stated that the province would not go bankrupt.

On 16 June 2018, delegates at the Liberal Party Annual General Meeting vote to endorse the leadership of Ball with 79% voting against the party holding a leadership convention.

=== Resignation ===
On 17 February 2020, Ball announced his pending resignation as leader of the Liberal Party and Premier amidst accusations of cronyism. The decision came after CBC News linked Ball to awarding the sole-source contract for the Crown corporation Nalcor Energy to Gordon McIntosh, former Deputy of Natural Resources Minister Siobhan Coady and the designer of Newfoundland and Labrador's off-shore energy plan.

The Liberal Party initially planned to elect a new leader in May 2020; however, the election was delayed by the COVID-19 pandemic. In the 2020 Liberal Party of Newfoundland and Labrador leadership election, surgeon Andrew Furey was chosen as Ball's successor. Furey was sworn in on 19 August 2020. On 7 September 2020 Ball resigned as MHA for Humber-Gros Morne.

== Brandon Phillips Murder Case ==
In October 2015, Dwight Ball's daughter, Jade Ball (born c. 1986), who was then 29 years old, was in an on-again, off-again romantic relationship with Brandon Phillips, a 27-year-old man from St. John's. On October 3, 2015, Phillips carried out an armed robbery at the Captain's Quarters Hotel in St. John's, during which he fatally shot 63-year-old hotel employee Larry Wellman, who had intervened to stop the robbery. Wellman succumbed to his injuries at the scene, marking the incident as a high-profile homicide in the province.

At the time, Ball was the leader of the Official Opposition for the Newfoundland and Labrador Liberal Party and was campaigning for the upcoming provincial election scheduled for November 30, 2015. Earlier in 2015, Ball experienced a series of disturbing incidents at his home, including items going missing such as a TV and a black North Face jacket. Ball also received threatening messages, with the tires of his car slashed and his windows smashed one evening. The harassment extended to fraudulent charges on his stolen credit card totalling tens of thousands of dollars, including the purchase of a vehicle. On October 5, Jade Ball reported to police that she was being harassed by individuals connected to a $40,000 drug debt owed by Phillips, including in-person threats from dealers who approached her directly, as well as threats that extended to her family.

Ball voluntarily contacted investigators on October 8 and provided crucial information, identifying Phillips as a potential suspect. He informed police that his daughter had been involved with Phillips for four to five years and that they had cohabited shortly after beginning their relationship, during which time both had struggled with serious opiate addiction. The stolen jacket played a key role in the identification, as it directly linked Phillips to the surveillance footage of the murder. This tip was instrumental in directing the investigation toward Phillips, who was arrested on October 10, 2015, and charged with first-degree murder and armed robbery.

The Royal Newfoundland Constabulary (RNC) placed Jade Ball under surveillance as a person of interest in the days following the murder and Phillips's arrest, monitoring her movements, residence, and vehicles registered to Dwight Ball, including two white Audi sedans. Surveillance teams also observed Jade Ball traveling with Phillips and an unidentified man in one of Ball's vehicles shortly after the killing, though the trail was briefly lost. Ball's condominium on Quidi Vidi Road was also briefly monitored. Evidence recovered during the investigation included sneakers from Phillips's apartment that tested positive for both his DNA and Wellman's blood on the treads. Neither Dwight Ball nor Jade Ball was implicated in the crime; Jade was explicitly noted in police documents as not being a target of the investigation.

Phillips's trial commenced in Supreme Court in St. John's in November 2017, where he was charged with first-degree murder. Dwight Ball received formal notice that he might be required to testify but was ultimately not called as a witness by the Crown. On December 8, 2017, a jury convicted Phillips of second-degree murder after deliberating for less than two hours, sentencing him to life imprisonment with no parole eligibility for 10 years. Phillips was also issued a no-contact order prohibiting communication with Jade Ball.

The case drew significant media attention due to Ball's rising political profile — he was elected premier on November 30, 2015, less than two months after tipping off police — and the personal dimensions involving his family. In December 2017, Ball successfully obtained a court injunction to temporarily block CBC News from publishing certain police documents related to his interactions with investigators and the search warrant before it was heard in Supreme Court, citing privacy concerns for his daughter. The partial media ban, which included a publication ban on details of Ball's injunction application, raised questions about transparency and potential conflicts of interest, particularly as it involved a sitting premier seeking to restrict access to documents tied to a high-profile murder trial.

Ball described the ordeal as a profound family challenge, compounded by Jade's struggles with drug addiction, which he addressed publicly in a December 20, 2017 interview with CBC News.

== Electoral record ==
2019 Newfoundland and Labrador general election
Party	Candidate	Votes	%	±%
Liberal	Dwight Ball	4,247	69.9	
Progressive Conservative	Greg Osmond	1,825	30.1	
Total valid votes				

Humber - Gros Morne - 2015 Newfoundland and Labrador general election
Party	Candidate	Votes	%	±%
Liberal	Dwight Ball	4,610	75.98%	–
Progressive Conservative	Graydon Pelley	983	16.20%	–
New Democratic	Mike Goosney	474	7.81%	–

2013 Liberal Party of Newfoundland and Labrador leadership election
	Ballot 1				Ballot 2				Ballot 3			
Candidate	Votes	%	Points	%	Votes	%	Points	%	Votes	%	Points	%
Dwight Ball	10,944	45.94%	2,130.05	44.38%	11,306	48.45%	2,257.15	47.02%	12,598	60.64%	2,832.29	59.01%
Paul Antle	6,340	26.61%	1,321.15	27.52%	6,600	28.28%	1,397.86	29.12%	8,178	39.36%	1,967.71	40.99%
Cathy Bennett	5,252	22.05%	1,089.05	22.69%	5,431	23.27%	1,144.99	23.85%				
Danny Dumaresque	670	2.81%	131.69	2.74%								
Jim Bennett	617	2.59%	128.05	2.67%								
Total	23,823	100.00	4,800.00	100.00	23,337	100.00	4,800.00	100.00	20,776	100.00	4,800.00	100.00

Humber Valley - 2011 Newfoundland and Labrador general election
Party	Candidate	Votes	%	±%
Liberal	Dwight Ball	2,609	48.14%	+1.05
Progressive Conservative	Darryl Kelly	2,541	46.88%	4.54
New Democratic	Sheldon Hynes	270	4.98%	–

Humber Valley - 2007 Newfoundland and Labrador general election
Party	Candidate	Votes	%	±%
Progressive Conservative	Darryl Kelly	3,023	51.42%	+2.88
Liberal	Dwight Ball	2,769	47.09%	-1.61
New Democratic	Kris Hynes	87	1.47%	–

Humber Valley - By-election, 13 February 2007 Resignation of Kathy Goudie
Party	Candidate	Votes	%	±%
Liberal	Dwight Ball	2,153	48.70%	+1.42
Progressive Conservative	Darryl Kelly	2,146	48.54%	–
New Democratic	Shelley Senior	122	2.76%	–

Humber Valley - 2003 Newfoundland and Labrador general election
Party	Candidate	Votes	%	±%
Progressive Conservative	Kathy Goudie	2,796	52.73%	–
Liberal	Dwight Ball	2,507	47.28%	–

Newfoundland and Labrador provincial government of Dwight Ball
Cabinet post (1)
Predecessor	Office	Successor
Paul Davis	Premier of Newfoundland and Labrador; 14 December 2015 – 19 August 2020	Andrew Furey
