= Humber Valley (electoral district) =

Former provincial electoral district in Newfoundland and Labrador, Canada

Newfoundland and Labrador electoral district
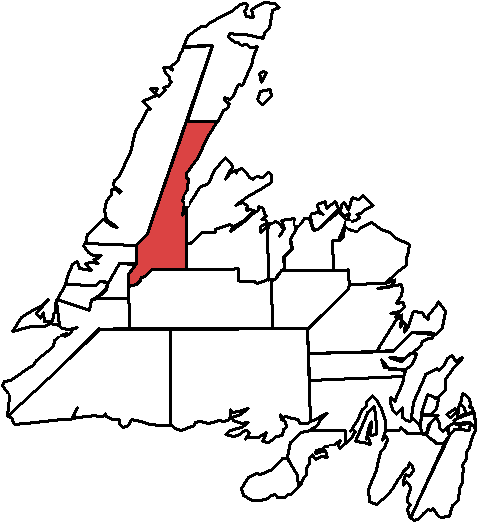
- Humber Valley in relation to other districts in Newfoundland

Defunct provincial electoral district
- Legislature: Newfoundland and Labrador House of Assembly
- District created: 1975
- Last contested: 2011

Demographics
- Population (2006): 10,449
- Electors (2011): 7,938

Humber Valley is a defunct provincial electoral district for the House of Assembly of Newfoundland and Labrador, Canada. In the 2011 Census, there were 7,938 eligible voters living within the district.

Humber Valley covered some of the best agricultural land in Newfoundland and Labrador, and ran from Deer Lake to just north of Great Harbour Deep. Apart from Deer Lake, other communities in the district included Cormack, Reidville, Hampden, Sop's Arm, and part of Pasadena.

The district was created for the 1975 provincial election out of parts of White Bay South, Humber East, and St. George's.

In 2015, the House of Assembly was reduced to 40 seats, and the district of Humber Valley was combined with part of the district of St. Barbe, forming the new district of Humber - Gros Morne.

== Members of the House of Assembly ==
The district has elected the following members of the House of Assembly:

Member	Party	Term
Dwight Ball	Liberal	2011–2015
Darryl Kelly	Progressive Conservative	2007–2011
Dwight Ball	Liberal	2007
Kathy Goudie	Progressive Conservative	2003–2007
Rick Woodford	Liberal	1996–2003
Rick Woodford	Progressive Conservative	1985–1996
Wallace House	Progressive Conservative	1975–1985

=== White Bay South ===
Member	Party	Term
William N. Rowe	Liberal	1966–1975
Frederick W. Rowe	Liberal	1956–1966

== Election results ==
2011 Newfoundland and Labrador general election
Party	Candidate	Votes	%	±%
Liberal	Dwight Ball	2,609	48.14	+1.04
Progressive Conservative	Darryl Kelly	2,541	46.88	-4.54
New Democratic	Sheldon Hynes	270	4.98	+3.50
Total valid votes		5,420	99.65	
Total rejected ballots		19	0.35	+0.09
Turnout		5,439	67.77	-6.52
Eligible voters		8,026		
Liberal gain from Progressive Conservative		Swing		+2.79

2007 Newfoundland and Labrador general election
Party	Candidate	Votes	%	±%
Progressive Conservative	Darryl Kelly	3,023	51.42	+2.88
Liberal	Dwight Ball	2,769	47.10	-1.60
New Democratic	Kris Hynes	87	1.48	-1.28
Total valid votes		5,879	99.75	
Total rejected ballots		15	0.25	+0.03
Turnout		5,894	74.29	+12.21
Eligible voters		7,934		
Progressive Conservative gain from Liberal		Swing		+2.24

Humber Valley - By-election, 13 February 2007 Resignation of Kathy Goudie
Party	Candidate	Votes	%	±%
Liberal	Dwight Ball	2,153	48.70	+1.42
Progressive Conservative	Darryl Kelly	2,146	48.54	-4.18
New Democratic	Shelley Senior	122	2.76	–
Total valid votes		4,421	99.77	
Total rejected ballots		10	0.23	-0.34
Turnout		4,431	62.08	-15.95
Eligible voters		7,138		
Liberal gain from Progressive Conservative		Swing		+2.80

2003 Newfoundland and Labrador general election
Party	Candidate	Votes	%	±%
Progressive Conservative	Kathy Goudie	2,796	52.72	+20.93
Liberal	Dwight Ball	2,507	47.28	-20.93
Total valid votes		5,303	99.44	
Total rejected ballots		30	0.56	+0.18
Turnout		5,333	78.02	+19.92
Eligible voters		6,835		
Progressive Conservative gain from Liberal		Swing		+20.93

1999 Newfoundland general election
Party	Candidate	Votes	%	±%
Liberal	Rick Woodford	3,051	68.21	-6.70
Progressive Conservative	Warren Rose	1,422	31.79	+6.70
Total valid votes		4,473	99.62	
Total rejected ballots		17	0.38	-0.04
Turnout		4,490	58.10	-13.17
Eligible voters		7,728		
Liberal hold		Swing		-6.70

1996 Newfoundland general election
Party	Candidate	Votes	%	±%
Liberal	Rick Woodford	4,109	74.91	+34.51
Progressive Conservative	Evelyn Organ	1,376	25.09	-32.57
Total valid votes		5,485	99.58	
Total rejected ballots		23	0.42	+0.01
Turnout		5,508	71.27	-13.22
Eligible voters		7,728		
Liberal gain from Progressive Conservative		Swing		+33.54

1993 Newfoundland general election
Party	Candidate	Votes	%	±%
Progressive Conservative	Rick Woodford	2,944	57.66	+1.82
Liberal	Gary Gale	2,063	40.40	-3.76
New Democratic	Catherine Shortall	99	1.94	–
Total valid votes		5,106	99.59	
Total rejected ballots		21	0.41	-0.41
Turnout		5,127	84.49	+4.53
Eligible voters		6,068		
Progressive Conservative hold		Swing		+1.58

1989 Newfoundland general election
Party	Candidate	Votes	%	±%
Progressive Conservative	Rick Woodford	2,687	55.84	+8.20
Liberal	Gary Gale	2,125	44.16	+5.05
Total valid votes		4,812	99.18	
Total rejected ballots		40	0.82	+0.50
Turnout		4,852	79.96	+3.56
Eligible voters		6,068		
Progressive Conservative hold		Swing		+2.79

1985 Newfoundland general election
Party	Candidate	Votes	%	±%
Progressive Conservative	Rick Woodford	2,197	47.64	-15.89
Liberal	David Hedd	1,804	39.12	+2.64
New Democratic	Terry Brazil	611	13.25	–
Total valid votes		4,612	99.68	
Total rejected ballots		15	0.32	-0.22
Turnout		4,627	76.40	-0.14
Eligible voters		6,056		
Progressive Conservative hold		Swing		-9.27

1982 Newfoundland general election
Party	Candidate	Votes	%	±%
Progressive Conservative	Wallace House	3,480	63.53	+10.89
Liberal	Kevin Saunders	1,998	36.47	-0.32
Total valid votes		5,478	99.46	
Total rejected ballots		30	0.54	+0.29
Turnout		5,508	76.54	+11.30
Eligible voters		7,196		
Progressive Conservative hold		Swing		+5.60

1979 Newfoundland general election
Party	Candidate	Votes	%	±%
Progressive Conservative	Wallace House	2,465	52.64	-0.40
Liberal	Kevin Saunders	1,723	36.79	+15.25
New Democratic	Allan Harvey French	495	10.57	–
Total valid votes		4,683	99.74	
Total rejected ballots		12	0.26	-0.22
Turnout		4,695	65.24	-4.17
Eligible voters		7,196		
Progressive Conservative hold		Swing		-7.83

1975 Newfoundland general election
Party	Candidate	Votes	%
Progressive Conservative	Wallace House	2,221	53.03
Liberal	Stanley Earl Parsons	902	21.54
Reform Liberal	Alex John Wiseman	865	20.65
Independent	Kenneth R. J. Prowse	200	4.78
Total valid votes		4,188	99.52
Total rejected ballots		20	0.48
Turnout		4,208	69.42
Eligible voters		6,062	

== See also ==
- List of Newfoundland and Labrador provincial electoral districts
- Canadian provincial electoral districts
