= 2016 Newfoundland and Labrador budget protests =

2016 Newfoundland and Labrador protests
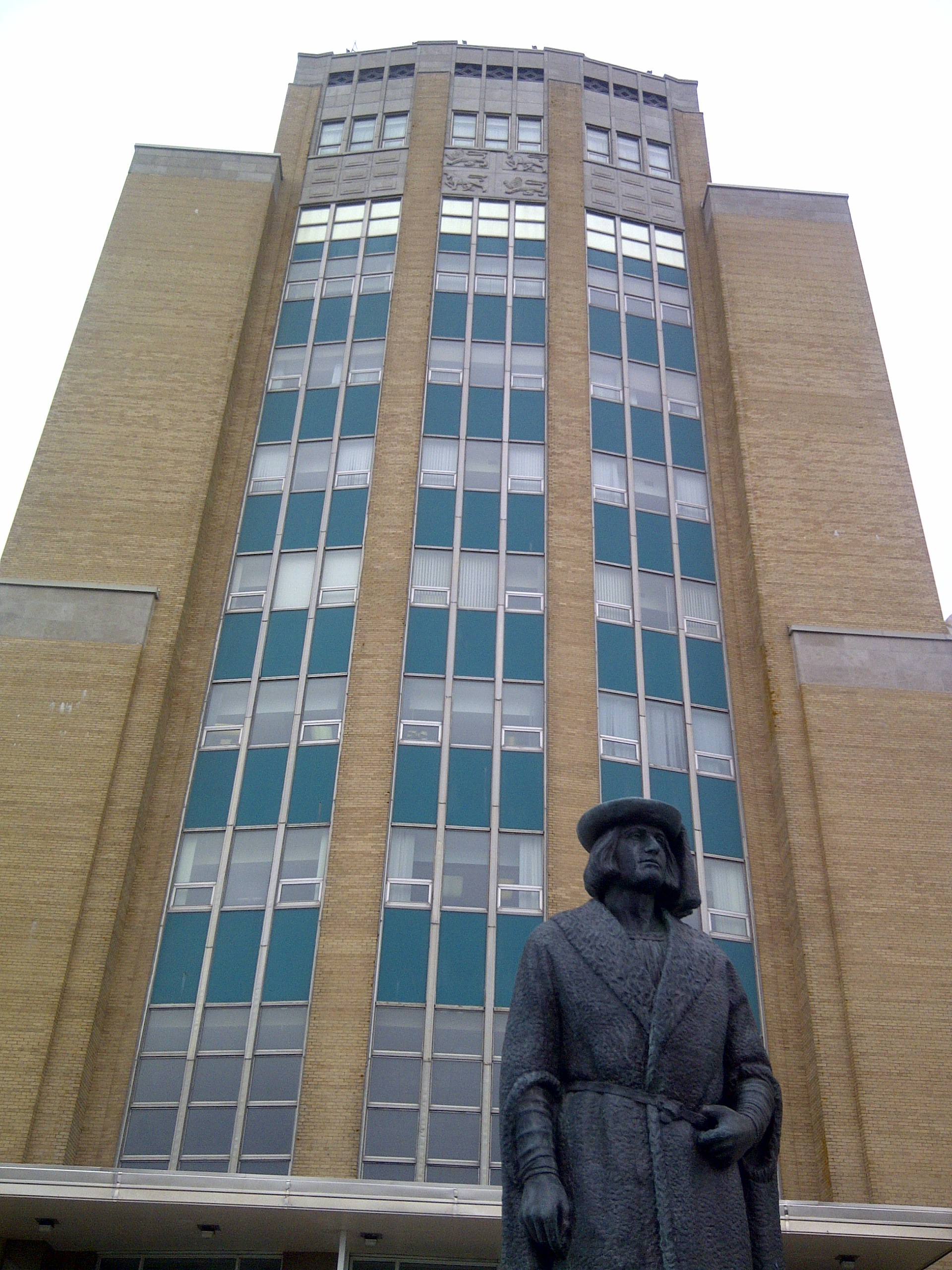
- Confederation Building in St. John's, the seat of the provincial legislature and the site of a series of protests.
- Date: 14 April 2016 — ~Summer 2016
- Location: Newfoundland and Labrador, Canada
- Caused by: Government overspending; Austerity; Deficit-reduction levy; Public-sector job cuts; High cost of living
- Methods: Protests; Demonstrations
- Status: May 19, 2016: Liberal MHA Paul Lane expelled from Liberal caucus due to his opposition to the levy.; May 25, 2016: Increased funding from the federal government reduces the number of residents who will have to pay the levy.; June 2016: Budget passes in the House of Assembly.

Parties
| Government of Newfoundland and Labrador | NAPE; CUPE; NLFL; Qalipu Mi'kmaq First Nation Band; Progressive Conservative Party; NDP |

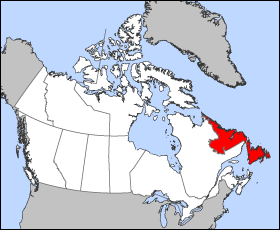
Newfoundland and Labrador's location in Canada. Newfoundland is the island to the east of the Canadian mainland while Labrador is the region to the northwest of Newfoundland or northeast of Quebec.

The 2016 Newfoundland and Labrador budget protests were a series of protests in the Canadian province of Newfoundland and Labrador. The protests were in opposition to the provincial budget proposed by Finance Minister Cathy Bennett which will implement tax-hikes and cuts to many public service jobs. The protests were a major part of the financial crisis in Newfoundland and Labrador.

== Context ==
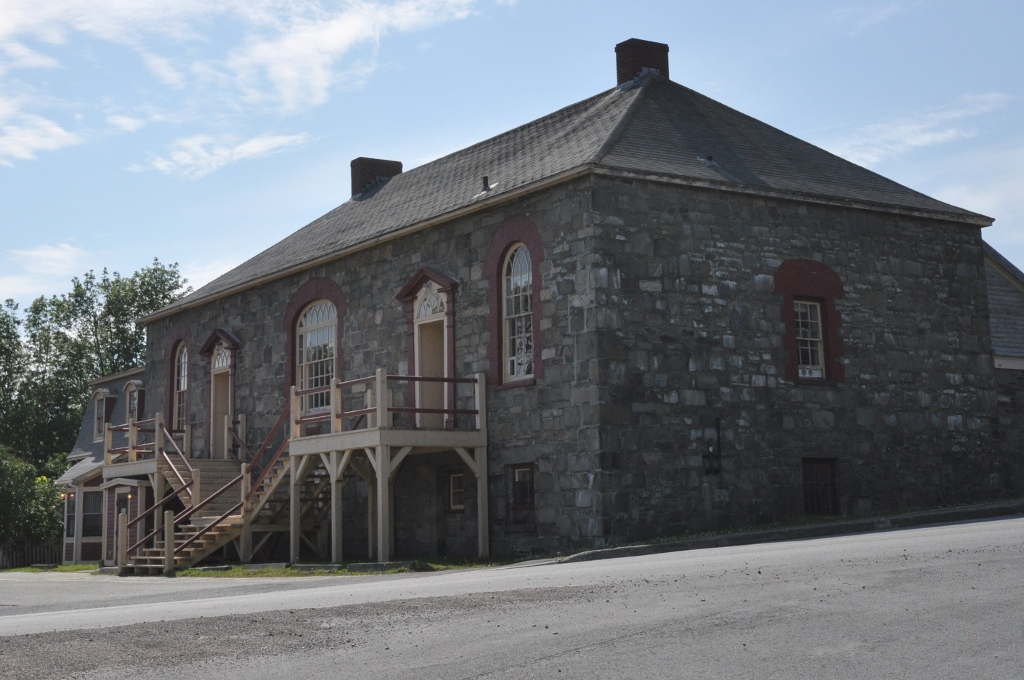
The courthouse in Harbour Grace will be one of the casualties of public-sector cuts.

Newfoundland and Labrador is one of Canada's oil-producing provinces and oil revenues account for a significant amount of the province's GDP. During the premiership of Danny Williams, oil prices were high and government spending increased. The province's public sector doubled in size while provincial government spending was 20–36% higher than most other provinces.

The recent drop in the price of oil caused a deficit for the province and the government did not expect to see another surplus until 2022. The provincial budget was unveiled by Finance Minister Cathy Bennett on April 14, 2016. In the budget, plans for more than 400 public-sector job cuts were announced, taxes on gasoline were doubled, the sales tax was increased and a "deficit-reduction levy" was to be introduced. This levy is an additional tax that will be imposed on residents with an annual income between $49,500 and $72,000.

=== Lower Churchill Project ===
One of the most notable mega-projects by the province under Williams was the Lower Churchill Project, a hydroelectric project in central Labrador on the Churchill River. During Williams's premiership the project received a great deal of support from Newfoundlanders; however, it was much more controversial among Labradorians. The position on the project taken by the Nunatsiavut government was even supported by Amnesty International. The project is being developed by Nalcor Energy and Emera. Nalcor is a provincial crown corporation based in St. John's.

The project is behind schedule and despite the province's financial situation and the high costs of the project, it is expected to continue development.

== Reaction to the budget ==
The budget has been very controversial since its unveiling.

Many notable people from the province have spoken out against the budget. Former Liberal Premier Roger Grimes criticized the introduction of the levy.

Several public and independent groups have formed in the province. These groups are motivated by the cyclical abuse, lack of democracy and mismanagement of the province ever since it joined the Confederation.

The groups or entities included:

- Coordinated Approach
- Mutual Aid
- Free NL
- Golden Arrow Community
- People's Union
- People's Assembly
- Newfrownland.ca

== Protests ==
Many protests by various organizations took place after April 2016. Former cabinet ministers under the Progressive Conservative government from 2003 to 2015 appeared at some protests (including former Premier Paul Davis) where they were often not well received.

=== Notable protest locations ===
- Bell Island
- Bonavista
- Burin
- Clarenville
- Corner Brook
- Gambo
- Grand Falls-Windsor
- Happy Valley-Goose Bay
- Harbour Grace
- King's Cove
- Portugal Cove-St. Philip's
- Ramea
- St. John's
- Swift Current
- Wabush
- Woody Point
