= John Dinn =

Canadian politician

Member of the Newfoundland and Labrador House of Assembly for Kilbride
- In office February 2007 – November 27, 2015
- Preceded by: Ed Byrne
- Succeeded by: District Abolished

St. John's City Councillor from Ward 5
- In office 1992–2005

Personal details
- Party: Progressive Conservative

John Dinn is a Canadian politician in Newfoundland and Labrador, Canada. He represented the district of Kilbride in the Newfoundland and Labrador House of Assembly from 2007 to 2015 as a member of the Progressive Conservative Party. From 1992 until 2005 Dinn represented Ward 5 on the St. John's City Council.

== Electoral record ==
2011 Newfoundland and Labrador general election
Party	Candidate	Votes	%	±%
Progressive Conservative	John Dinn	3,347	58.43%	–
NDP	Paul Boundridge	1,927	33.64%	
Liberal	Brian Hanlon	454	7.93%	

2007 Newfoundland and Labrador general election
Party	Candidate	Votes	%	±%
Progressive Conservative	John Dinn	4,443	84.48%	–
NDP	Michelle Broderick	421	8.01%	
Liberal	Roger Linehan	364	6.92%	
Independent	Paul Perrier	31	0.59%	

By-Election: February 8, 2007 On the resignation of Ed Byrne
Party	Candidate	Votes	%	±%
PC	John Dinn	2,744	78.83	+0.55
Liberal	Bob Clarke	508	14.59	-1.18
NDP	Gemma Schlamp-Hickey	229	6.58	+0.63
Total		3,481	100%	
