= Anna Thistle =

Canadian politician

The Honourable Anna Thistle ECNL

MHA for Grand Falls-Windsor-Buchans
- In office 22 February 1996 – 9 October 2007
- Preceded by: Mike Mackey
- Succeeded by: Susan Sullivan

Minister of Labour, And Minister of youth Services
- In office February 13, 2001 – November 5, 2003
- Preceded by: Sandra Kelly
- Succeeded by: John Ottenheimer

President of the Treasury Board
- In office December 15, 1998 – February 15, 2001
- Preceded by: Paul Dicks
- Succeeded by: Joan Marie Aylward

Personal details
- Party: Newfoundland & Labrador Liberal Party
- Occupation: Credit Union Manager, Municipal Councillor

Anna Thistle is a Canadian politician. She represented the electoral district of Grand Falls-Windsor-Buchans in the Newfoundland and Labrador House of Assembly from 1996 to 2007. She was a member of the Liberal Party of Newfoundland & Labrador.

Thistle worked for the Canadian Imperial Bank of Commerce at various branches in Newfoundland and Labrador. Then, in 1977, she became the first manager for the Newfoundland and Labrador Credit Union branch in Grand Falls-Windsor, serving in that position until her election to the provincial assembly in 1996. She was elected to the first council for the amalgamated town of Grand Falls-Windsor in 1990 and was reelected in 1993. Thistle took responsibility for developing and implementing the town and region's Strategic Economic Development Plan.

In 1998, she was named President of Treasury Board. In 2001, she was named Minister of Labour and, in 2003, Minister of Youth Services and Post-Secondary Education.

Thistle did not stand for re-election in the 2007 general election.
