= Susan Sullivan (Canadian politician) =

Canadian politician

The Honourable Susan Sullivan ECNL

Minister of Health and Community Services
- In office October 28, 2011 – May 1, 2014
- Preceded by: Jerome Kennedy
- Succeeded by: Paul Davis

Member of the Newfoundland and Labrador House of Assembly for Grand Falls-Windsor-Buchans
- In office November 27, 2007 – November 5, 2015
- Preceded by: Anna Thistle
- Succeeded by: District Abolished

Minister of Innovation, Trade and Rural Development
- In office December 6, 2010 – October 28, 2011
- Preceded by: Shawn Skinner
- Succeeded by: Department eliminated

Minister of Human Resources, Labour & Employment
- In office October 31, 2008 – December 6, 2010
- Preceded by: Shawn Skinner
- Succeeded by: Joan Burke (acting)

Minister of Education and Early Childhood Development
- In office September 30, 2014 – December 14, 2015
- Preceded by: Darin King
- Succeeded by: Dale Kirby

Personal details
- Born: Grand Falls-Windsor, Newfoundland and Labrador
- Party: Progressive Conservative
- Occupation: Educator

Susan Sullivan is a Canadian politician in Newfoundland and Labrador, Canada. She represented the electoral district of Grand Falls-Windsor-Buchans in Newfoundland and Labrador House of Assembly from 2007 to 2015. She was a member of the Progressive Conservative Party.

She served in the provincial cabinet as Minister of Education and Early Childhood Development, Minister of Innovation, Business and Rural Development, Minister of Health and Community Services, Minister of Innovation, Trade and Rural Development and Minister of Human Resources, Labour and Employment. Prior to her entrance into provincial politics Sullivan had a 30-year teaching career and was the Deputy Mayor of Grand Falls-Windsor.

== Background ==
Sullivan was born and raised in Grand Falls-Windsor, Newfoundland and Labrador. She studied at Memorial University of Newfoundland, where she obtained a Bachelor of Arts, majoring in French, and a Bachelor of Education. She received her Masters of Education from Mount St. Vincent University, in Halifax, as well she was awarded a French immersion diploma from Université Laval, in Quebec City. Sullivan had a 30-year teaching career and retired in June 2007. In her last seven years as an educator she was French Department Head for the Centre for Distance Learning and Innovation, during this time she taught senior high French to all parts of the province via the Internet. In 2005, she was elected Deputy Mayor of Grand Falls-Windsor and held this post until entering provincial politics.

== Provincial politics ==
In June 2007, Sullivan defeated two others to win the Progressive Conservative Party nomination for the district of Grand Falls-Windsor-Buchans. In the three-person race, Sullivan captured 53 per cent of the 1,700 votes cast. The provincial election was set for October 9, 2007, but during the campaign Sullivan's Liberal opponent died suddenly. The election in the district was postponed due to the death and was held on November 6, 2007. After a big victory by the Progressive Conservatives in the general election, Sullivan took 72 per cent of the vote in the deferred election. On October 31, 2008, Premier Danny Williams appointed Sullivan to cabinet as the Minister of Human Resources, Labour and Employment and Minister responsible for Francophone Affairs. On December 6, 2010, Premier Kathy Dunderdale appointed Sullivan as Minister of Innovation, Trade, and Rural Development, Minister responsible for the Status of Women and she continued as Minister responsible for Francophone Affairs.

In the October 11, 2011 provincial election, Sullivan was easily re-elected as the member of the House of Assembly (MHA) for Grand Falls-Windsor-Buchans. Weeks later she was sworn in as the Minister of Health and Community Services. On May 1, 2014, Sullivan was moved to the Department of Innovation, Business and Rural Development. On September 5, 2014, she was given an additional role in cabinet as Minister responsible for the Status of Women. When Paul Davis took over as premier in September 2014, Sullivan was appointed Minister of Education and Early Childhood Development. On October 16, 2015, Sullivan announced that she would not seek re-election in the 2015 election.

== Electoral record ==
2011 Newfoundland and Labrador general election
Party	Candidate	Votes	%	±%
Progressive Conservative	Susan Sullivan	2,957	61.62%	–
Liberal	Wayne Morris	1,540	32.09%	
NDP	John Whelan	302	6.29%	

2007 general election, November 6, 2007
Party	Candidate	Votes	%	±%
Progressive Conservative	Susan Sullivan	2,767	71.83	
NDP	Junior C. Downey	922	23.93	
Liberal	John J. Woodrow	163	4.23	
