= Jim Hodder (politician) =

Canadian politician (1940–2021)

Minister of Cultural Affairs, Tourism and Historic Resources
- In office March 27, 1989 – May 5, 1989
- Preceded by: Office Established
- Succeeded by: Office Abolished

MHA for Port au Port
- In office 2003–2007
- Preceded by: Gerald Smith
- Succeeded by: Tony Cornect
- In office 1975–1993
- Preceded by: First Member
- Succeeded by: Gerald Smith

Personal details
- Born: December 29, 1940 Rose Blanche, Dominion of Newfoundland
- Died: March 2, 2021 (aged 80) St. John's, Newfoundland and Labrador
- Party: Progressive Conservative (1985–2007)
- Other political affiliations: Liberal (1975–1985)
- Occupation: High School Teacher

James Eric Hodder (December 29, 1940 – March 2, 2021) was a Canadian politician, who represented the electoral district of Port au Port in the Newfoundland and Labrador House of Assembly from 1975 to 1993, and again from 2003 to 2007. He started as a member of the Liberal Party; however, in 1985, he crossed the floor to join Brian Peckford's Progressive Conservative government.

A graduate of Memorial University of Newfoundland with bachelor's degrees in history and education, he was a high school teacher and principal in Stephenville before entering politics. His father Walter also served in the Newfoundland assembly.

He retired from the legislature for health reasons in January 2007, and was succeeded by Tony Cornect in a by-election. He died in St. John's on March 2, 2021.
