= Norman's Cove-Long Cove =

- Town
- Interactive map of Norman's Cove-Long Cove
- Coordinates: 47°32′45″N 53°41′24″W
- Country: Canada
- Province: Newfoundland and Labrador

Government
  - Mayor: Don Haley
  - Member of Parliament: Jonathan Rowe (C)
  - Member of the House of Assembly: Jeff Dwyer (PC)

Area
  - Total: 19.98 km^{2} (7.71 sq mi)

Population (2021)
  - Total: 647
- Time zone: UTC-3:30 (Newfoundland Time)
  - Summer (DST): UTC-2:30 (Newfoundland Daylight)
- Postal code: A0B 2T0
- Area code: 709
- Highways: Route 201

Norman's Cove-Long Cove is a town in the Canadian province of Newfoundland and Labrador. The town had a population of 647 in the Canada 2021 Census, down from 720 in 2011.

== Demographics ==
In the 2021 Census of Population conducted by Statistics Canada, Norman's Cove-Long Cove had a population of 647 living in 291 of its 342 total private dwellings, a change of −2.9% from its 2016 population of 666. With a land area of 20.15 km^{2} (7.78 sq mi), it had a population density of 32.1/km^{2} (83.2/sq mi) in 2021.

== See also ==
- List of municipalities in Newfoundland and Labrador
