= Gerald Smith (Canadian politician) =

Canadian politician

The Honourable Gerald Smith ECNL

MHA for Port au Port
- In office 1993–2003
- Preceded by: Jim Hodder
- Succeeded by: Jim Hodder

Personal details
- Born: November 30, 1943 (age 82) Lourdes, Dominion of Newfoundland
- Party: Liberal

Gerald Smith (born November 30, 1943) is a Canadian politician. He represented the riding of Port au Port in the Newfoundland and Labrador House of Assembly from 1993 to 2003 as a member of the Liberal Party.

The son of John Thomas Smith, he was born in Lourdes and was educated there, at Memorial University and at the Université du Québec à Trois-Rivières. In 1968, he married Barbara Radford. Before entering politics, Smith was a teacher and elementary school principal. He also served as mayor of Lourdes.

He served as minister of human resources and employment and minister of health in the Executive Council of Newfoundland and Labrador, in the government of Roger Grimes. Smith was defeated by Jim Hodder when he ran for reelection in 2003.
