= Rick Woodford =

Canadian politician

Rick Woodford (1948–2006) was a former Newfoundland and Labrador MHA and cabinet minister.

Woodford served ten years as mayor of Cormack, also serving as a director for the Newfoundland Federation of Municipalities. He had been MHA for Humber Valley for 18 years, and became minister of forest resources and agrifoods in the Liberal government of Roger Grimes. He sat as a Progressive Conservative from 1985 to 1996, until running as a Liberal in 1996. He underwent surgery for a brain tumour in 2001 and retired in 2003 due to the pain and side effects associated with follow-on treatments.

He died in April 2006 in a canoeing incident, along with his female companion. The bodies were found on April 16 in Birchy Lake, near Cormack.

== Electoral record ==
Humber Valley - 1999 Newfoundland and Labrador general election
Party	Candidate	Votes	%	±%
Liberal	Rick Woodford	3,051	68.21%	-6.7
Progressive Conservative	Warren Rose	1,422	31.79%	–

Humber Valley - 1996 Newfoundland and Labrador general election
Party	Candidate	Votes	%	±%
Liberal	Rick Woodford	4,109	74.91%	+17.25
Progressive Conservative	Evelyn Organ	1,376	25.09%	–

Humber Valley - 1993 Newfoundland and Labrador general election
Party	Candidate	Votes	%	±%
Progressive Conservative	Rick Woodford	2,944	57.66%	+1.82
Liberal	Gary Gale	2,063	40.40%	-3.76
New Democratic	Catherine Shortall	99	1.94%	–

Humber Valley - 1989 Newfoundland and Labrador general election
Party	Candidate	Votes	%	±%
Progressive Conservative	Rick Woodford	2,687	55.84%	+8.2
Liberal	Gary Gale	2,125	44.16%	–

Humber Valley - 1985 Newfoundland and Labrador general election
Party	Candidate	Votes	%	±%
Progressive Conservative	Rick Woodford	2,197	47.64%	–
Liberal	David Hedd	1,804	39.12%	–
New Democratic	Terry Brazil	611	13.25%	–
