= 1966 Newfoundland general election =

Canadian provincial election

- September 8, 1966

42 seats to the 34th General Assembly of Newfoundland 22 seats needed for a majority
- Turnout: 61.8% (▲3.3 pp)
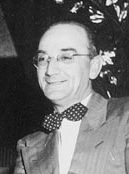
	First party	Second party
		PC
Leader	Joey Smallwood	Noel Murphy
Party	Liberal	Progressive Conservative
Leader since	1949	1966
Leader's seat	Humber West (Note: Not the incumbent, but stood in this seat and won)	Humber East (Note: Was defeated for re-election in this seat)
Last election	34 seats, 58.7%	7 seats, 36.6%
Seats won	39	3
Seat change	▲5	▼4
Popular vote	91,613	50,316
Percentage	61.8%	34.0%
Swing	▲3.1pp	▼2.6pp
Premier before election
Joey Smallwood
Liberal
Premier after election
Joey Smallwood
Liberal

The 1966 Newfoundland general election was held on 8 September 1966 to elect members of the 34th General Assembly of Newfoundland. It was won by the Liberal party.

== Results ==
Party	Leader	1962	Seats won	% change	Popular vote	(%)
Liberal	Joey Smallwood	34	39	+15%	91,613	61.8%
Progressive Conservative	Noel Murphy	7	3	-57%	50,316	34.0%
New Democratic	Calvin Normore	0	0	0%	2,725	1.8%
Other		1	0	-100%	3,548	2.4%
Totals		42	42	-	149,371	100%

== Results by district ==
- Names in **boldface type** represent party leaders.
- † indicates that the incumbent did not run again.
- ‡ indicates that the incumbent ran in a different district.

=== St. John's ===
Electoral district	Candidates		Incumbent
Electoral district	Liberal	PC	Incumbent
St. John's Centre; 66.15% turnout	Denis Galway; 1,773; 39.58%	Anthony Murphy; 2,706; 60.42%	Anthony Murphy
St. John's East; 71.61% turnout	Kevin O'Regan; 1,373; 37.13%	Gerry Ottenheimer; 2,325; 62.87%	James Greene†
St. John's East Extern; 70.78% turnout	John Murphy; 3,327; 47.84%	Tom Hickey; 3,627; 52.16%	William Browne†
St. John's North; 66.97% turnout	Nathaniel Noel; 4,586; 57.33%	Mervyn Russell; 3,414; 42.67%	Geoffrey Carnell†
St. John's South; 73.65% turnout	John Nolan; 4,166; 54.71%	Rex Renouf; 3,448; 45.29%	Rex Renouf
St. John's West; 69.20% turnout	John Crosbie; 4,054; 57.63%	Harvey Cole; 2,980; 42.37%	William Adams†

=== Conception Bay ===
Electoral district	Candidates			Incumbent
Electoral district	Liberal	PC	Other	Incumbent
Bay de Verde; 63.70% turnout	William Saunders; 1,363; 66.61%	Walter Hudson; 395; 19.31%	Alvin Clarke (Independent); 288; 14.08%	William Saunders
Bell Island; 57.09% turnout	Steve Neary; 1,761; 75.55%	Herbert Buckingham; 423; 18.15%	Joseph Gendreau (Independent); 147; 6.31%	Steve Neary
Carbonear; 65.80% turnout	George Clarke; 1,591; 64.02%	Joseph Noel; 555; 22.33%	Elmer Vaters (Independent); 339; 13.64%	George Clarke
Harbour Grace; 61.49% turnout	Alec Moores; 2,296; 75.38%	Harold Osborne; 750; 24.62%		Claude Sheppard†
Harbour Main; 66.37% turnout	Philip Lewis; 2,712; 30.83%	Gordon Dawe; 2,090; 23.74%	James Hickey (Independent); 534; 6.07%	Philip Lewis
Harbour Main; 66.37% turnout	John Mahoney; 2,342; 26.61%	John Carroll; 1,120; 12.73%	James Hickey (Independent); 534; 6.07%	Clifton Joy†
Port de Grave; 54.23% turnout	Eric Dawe; 1,696; 66.64%	Lloyd Stevens; 849; 33.36%		Eric Dawe

=== Avalon Peninsula ===
Electoral district	Candidates		Incumbent
Electoral district	Liberal	PC	Incumbent
Ferryland; 68.85% turnout	Aidan Maloney; 1,905; 69.70%	Thomas Greene; 828; 30.30%	Myles Murray†
Placentia East; 72.22% turnout	Alain Frecker; 2,037; 62.47%	William Patterson; 1,224; 37.53%	Alain Frecker
St. Mary's; 71.32% turnout	James M. McGrath; 1,229; 67.49%	John Halley; 592; 32.51%	James M. McGrath
Trinity South; 53.07% turnout	Uriah Strickland; 1,840; 51.80%	John Carter; 1,712; 48.20%	Uriah Strickland

=== Eastern Newfoundland ===
Electoral district	Candidates			Incumbent
Electoral district	Liberal	PC	Other	Incumbent
Bonavista North; 52.87% turnout	Beaton Abbott; 2,932; 73.65%	John Pinsent; 834; 20.95%	Hubert Granter (NDP); 215; 5.40%	**Joey Smallwood**‡ (ran in Humber West)
Bonavista South; 45.36% turnout	Rossy Barbour; 2,161; 63.71%	William Moss; 1,231; 36.29%		Rossy Barbour
Fogo; 48.76% turnout	Eric Jones; 2,150; 73.33%	Artie Willis; 782; 26.67%		Edward Spencer†
Trinity North; 46.72% turnout	Maxwell Lane; 2,215; 62.93%	Robert Barton; 638; 18.13%	Sam Drover (Independent); 667; 18.95%	Arthur Mifflin†

=== Central Newfoundland ===
Electoral district	Candidates		Incumbent
Electoral district	Liberal	PC	Incumbent
Gander; 66.71% turnout	Charles Granger; 3,180; 61.13%	Harold Collins; 2,022; 38.87%	Beaton Abbott‡ (ran in Bonavista North)
Grand Falls; 75.57% turnout	Frederick W. Rowe; 3,642; 55.31%	Ambrose Peddle; 2,943; 44.69%	Ambrose Peddle
Green Bay; 65.48% turnout	William Smallwood; 2,496; 71.17%	Rupert Short; 1,011; 28.83%	William Smallwood
Lewisporte; 54.95% turnout	Harold Starkes; 2,287; 73.85%	Douglas Hayward; 810; 26.15%	Harold Starkes
Twillingate	Leslie Curtis; Won by acclamation		Leslie Curtis
White Bay South; 63.24% turnout	Bill Rowe; 2,014; 79.95%	Cyril Pelley; 505; 20.05%	Frederick W. Rowe‡ (ran in Grand Falls)

=== Southern Newfoundland ===
Electoral district	Candidates		Incumbent
Electoral district	Liberal	PC	Incumbent
Burgeo-La Poile; 58.16% turnout	Walter Hodder; 2,331; 68.68%	Allan Evans; 1,063; 31.32%	Walter Hodder
Burin; 56.56% turnout	Alex Hickman; 2,744; 79.01%	Scott Bradley; 729; 20.99%	Eric Jones‡ (ran in Fogo)
Fortune Bay	H.R.V. Earle; Won by acclamation		H.R.V. Earle
Hermitage	Abel Wornell; Won by acclamation		Abel Wornell
Placentia West; 62.59% turnout	Patrick Canning; 2,367; 74.34%	Joseph Cheeseman; 817; 25.66%	Patrick Canning

=== Western Newfoundland ===
Electoral district	Candidates			Incumbent
Electoral district	Liberal	PC	Other	Incumbent
Humber East; 74.70% turnout	Clyde Wells; 3,652; 52.74%	**Noel Murphy**; 3,273; 47.26%		**Noel Murphy**
Humber West; 67.53% turnout	**Joey Smallwood**; 4,431; 67.21%		**Calvin Normore** (NDP); 2,162; 32.79%	Charles Ballam†
Port au Port; 76.87% turnout	William Callahan; 2,454; 57.61%	Berkley Evans; 948; 22.25%	Michael Harper (Independent); 858; 20.14%	Stephen Smith†
St. Barbe North; 63.92% turnout	James Chalker; 1,139; 79.48%	Gerald Hynes; 294; 20.52%		James Chalker
St. Barbe South; 66.93% turnout	Gerald Myrden; 1,511; 64.68%	Andrew Swimm; 825; 35.32%		Vacant (Note: William Smith had been elected in 1962, but he had died on August 4, 1965.)
St. George's; 72.61% turnout	William Keough; 1,736; 51.24%	Prime Power; 937; 27.66%	Fred Wells (Independent); 715; 21.10%	William Keough
White Bay North; 61.99% turnout	Edward Roberts; 2,165; 84.94%	Anita Sulley; 384; 15.06%		Walter Carter†

=== Labrador ===
Electoral district	Candidates			Incumbent
Electoral district	Liberal	PC	NDP	Incumbent
Labrador North; 57.38% turnout	Earl Winsor; 1,333; 71.25%	Arthur Hale; 538; 28.75%		Earl Winsor
Labrador South; 58.99% turnout	Gerald Hill; 1,129; 90.39%	Leace Critch; 120; 9.61%		Gerald Hill
Labrador West; 64.10% turnout	Tom Burgess; 1,493; 61.82%	Charles Devine; 574; 23.77%	Albert McGrath; 348; 14.41%	Charles Devine
