= 34th General Assembly of Newfoundland =

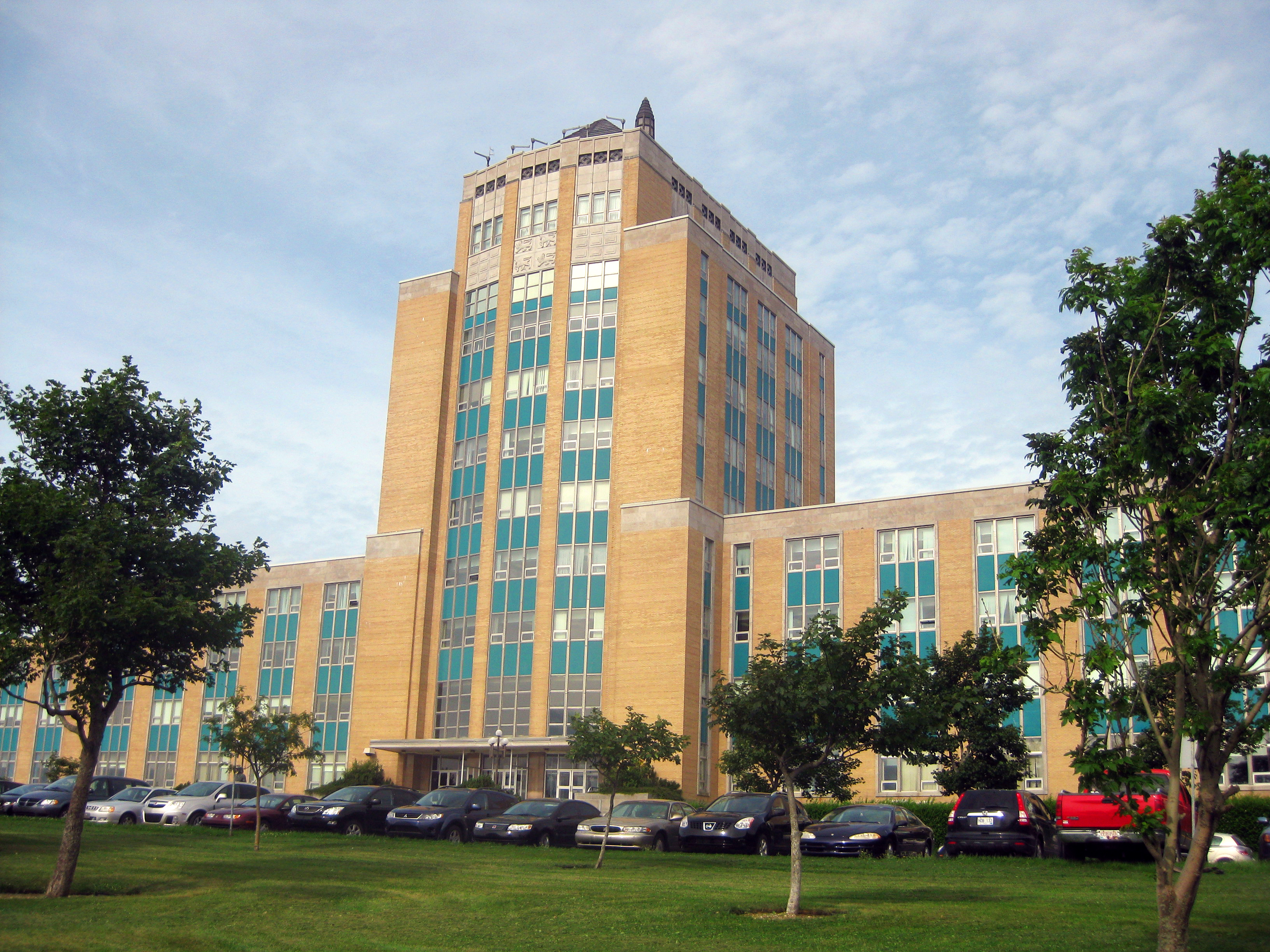
- Confederation Building East Block. Seat of the Newfoundland and Labrador government and the House of Assembly from 1960 to present.

History
- Founded: November 30, 1966
- Disbanded: October 4, 1971
- Preceded by: 33rd General Assembly of Newfoundland
- Succeeded by: 35th General Assembly of Newfoundland

Leadership
- Premier: Joey Smallwood

Elections
- Last election: 1966 Newfoundland general election

The members of the 34th General Assembly of Newfoundland were elected in the Newfoundland general election held in September 1966. The general assembly sat from November 30, 1966, to October 4, 1971.

The Liberal Party led by Joey Smallwood formed the government.

George W. Clarke served as speaker.

There were five sessions of the 34th General Assembly:

Session	Start	End
1st	November 30, 1966	February 1, 1968
2nd	February 21, 1968	November 1, 1968
3rd	February 24, 1969	November, 1969
4th	February 1, 1970	February 1, 1970
5th	March 22, 1971	March 22, 1971

Fabian O'Dea served as lieutenant governor of Newfoundland until 1969. Ewart John Arlington Harnum succeeded O'Dea as lieutenant-governor.

== Members of the Assembly ==
The following members were elected to the assembly in 1966:

Member	Electoral district	Party	First elected / previously elected
William P. Saunders	Bay de Verde	Liberal	1962
Stephen A. Neary	Bell Island	Liberal	1962
Beaton J. Abbott	Bonavista North	Liberal	1956
Ross Barbour	Bonavista South	Liberal	1959
Walter H. Hodder	Burgeo and La Poile	Liberal	1962
T. Alexander Hickman	Burin	Liberal	1966
George W. Clarke	Carbonear	Liberal	1956
Aidan J. Maloney	Ferryland	Liberal	1966
Eric S. Jones	Fogo	Liberal	1956
H.R.V. Earle	Fortune	Liberal	1962
Charles R. Granger	Gander	Liberal	1966
Harold Collins (1967)	Gander	Progressive Conservative	1967
Frederick W. Rowe	Grand Falls	Liberal	1952
William R. Smallwood	Green Bay	Liberal	1956
Alexander D. Moores	Harbour Grace	Liberal	1966
Philip J. Lewis	Harbour Main	Liberal	1951
John W. Mahoney	Harbour Main	Liberal	1966
Abel Wornell (Note: Elected by acclamation)	Hermitage	Liberal	1966
Clyde Wells	Humber East	Liberal	1966
Joseph R. Smallwood	Humber West	Liberal	1949
Earl W. Winsor	Labrador North	Liberal	1956
Gerald I. Hill	Labrador South	Liberal	1962
Thomas W. Burgess	Labrador West	Liberal	1966
Thomas W. Burgess	Labrador West	Labrador Party	1966
Harold Starkes	Lewisporte	Liberal	1962
G. Alain Frecker	Placentia East	Liberal	1959
Patrick J. Canning	Placentia West	Liberal	1949
William R. Callahan	Port au Port	Liberal	1966
Eric N. Dawe	Port de Grave	Liberal	1962
James R. Chalker	St. Barbe North	Liberal	1949
Gerald Myrden	St. Barbe South	Liberal	1966
William J. Keough	St. George's	Liberal	1949
Anthony J. Murphy	St. John's Centre	Progressive Conservative	1962
Gerald R. Ottenheimer	St. John's East	Progressive Conservative	1966
William Marshall (1970)	St. John's East	Progressive Conservative	1970
Thomas V. Hickey	St. John's East Extern	Progressive Conservative	1966
Nathaniel S. Noel	St. John's North	Liberal	1966
John A. Nolan	St. John's South	Liberal	1966
John C. Crosbie	St. John's West	Liberal	1966
John C. Crosbie	St. John's West	Progressive Conservative	1966
James M. McGrath	St. Mary's	Liberal	1956
C. Maxwell Lane	Trinity North	Liberal	1956, (Note: White Bay) 1963
Uriah F. Strickland	Trinity South	Liberal	1956
Leslie R. Curtis	Twillingate	Liberal	1949
Edward M. Roberts	White Bay North	Liberal	1966
William N. Rowe	White Bay South	Liberal	1966

== By-elections ==
By-elections were held to replace members for various reasons:

Electoral district	Member elected	Affiliation	Election date	Reason
Gander	Harold A. Collins	Progressive Conservative	October 20, 1967	C R Granger ran for federal seat
St. John's East	William Marshall	Progressive Conservative	June 26, 1970	G R Ottenheimer resigned seat to pursue studies abroad
