= 33rd General Assembly of Newfoundland =

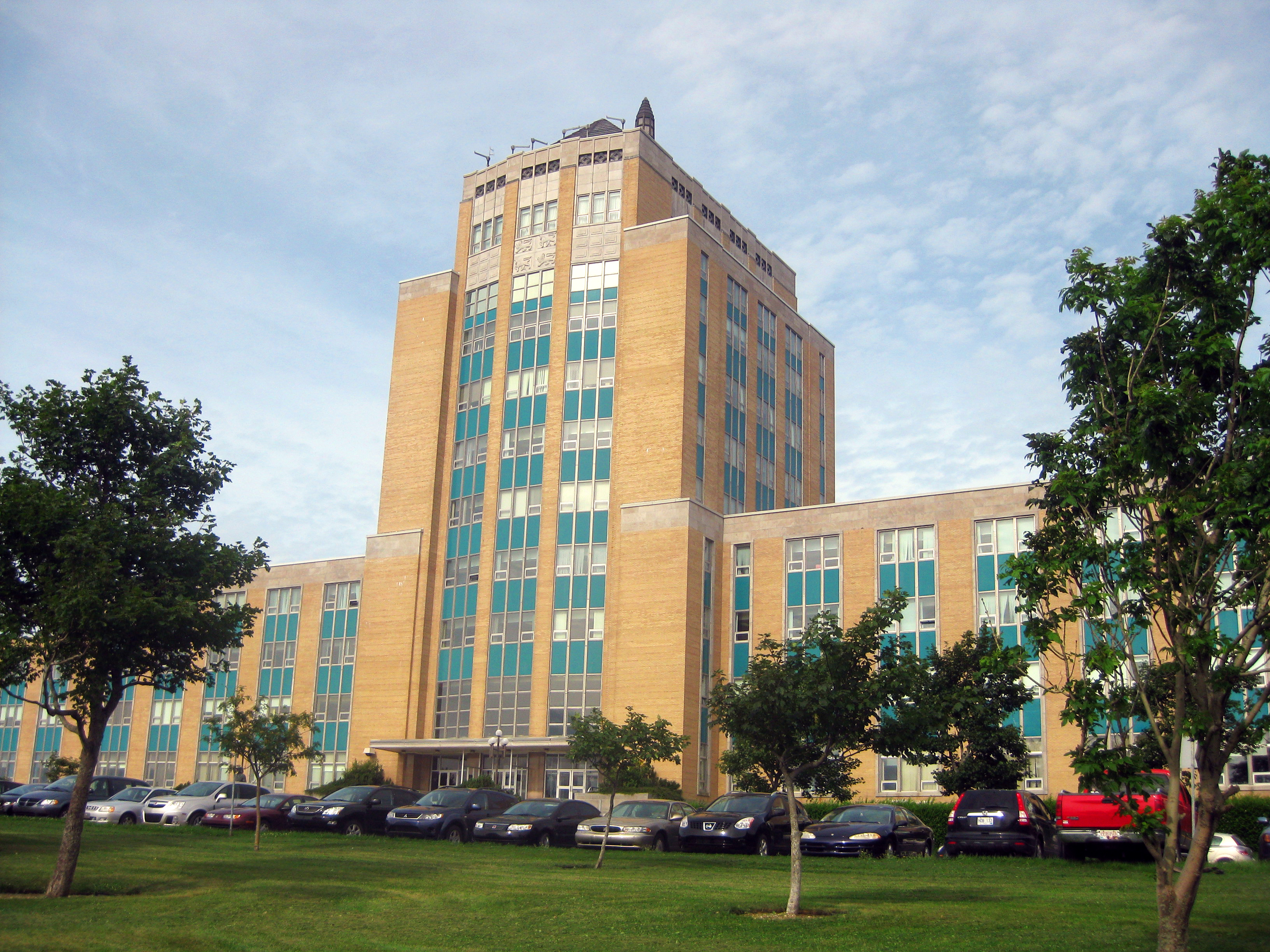
- Confederation Building East Block. Seat of the Newfoundland and Labrador government and the House of Assembly from 1960 to present.

History
- Founded: March 20, 1963
- Disbanded: August 17, 1966
- Preceded by: 32nd General Assembly of Newfoundland
- Succeeded by: 34th General Assembly of Newfoundland

Leadership
- Premier: Joey Smallwood

Elections
- Last election: 1962 Newfoundland general election

The members of the 33rd General Assembly of Newfoundland were elected in the Newfoundland general election held in November 1962. The general assembly sat from March 20, 1963 to August 17, 1966.

The Liberal Party led by Joey Smallwood formed the government.

George W. Clarke served as speaker.

There were four sessions of the 33rd General Assembly:

Session	Start	End
1st	March 20, 1963	February 14, 1964
2nd	March 4, 1964	January 26, 1965
3rd	January 27, 1965	January 12, 1966
4th	January 12, 1966	March 25, 1966

Campbell Leonard Macpherson served as lieutenant governor of Newfoundland until 1963. Fabian O'Dea succeeded Macpherson as lieutenant-governor.

== Members of the Assembly ==
The following members were elected to the assembly in 1962:

Member	Electoral district	Party	First elected / previously elected
William P. Saunders	Bay de Verde	Liberal	1962
Stephen A. Neary	Bell Island	Liberal	1962
Joseph R. Smallwood	Bonavista North	Liberal	1949
Ross Barbour	Bonavista South	Liberal	1959
Walter H. Hodder	Burgeo and La Poile	Liberal	1962
Eric S. Jones	Burin	Liberal	1956
George W. Clarke	Carbonear	Liberal	1956
Myles P. Murray	Ferryland	Liberal	1952
Edward S. Spencer (Note: Elected by acclamation)	Fogo	Liberal	1949
H.R.V. Earle	Fortune	Liberal	1962
Beaton J. Abbott	Gander	Liberal	1956
Ambrose H. Peddle	Grand Falls	Progressive Conservative	1962
William R. Smallwood	Green Bay	Liberal	1956
Claude A. Sheppard	Harbour Grace	Liberal	1956
Philip J. Lewis	Harbour Main	Liberal	1951
Clifton Joy	Harbour Main	Liberal	1962
John T. Cheeseman	Hermitage	Liberal	1956
Noel Murphy	Humber East	Progressive Conservative	1962
Charles H. Ballam	Humber West	Liberal	1949
Earl W. Winsor	Labrador North	Liberal	1956
Gerald I. Hill	Labrador South	Liberal	1962
Charles S. Devine	Labrador West	Independent	1962
Harold Starkes	Lewisporte	Liberal	1962
G. Alain Frecker	Placentia East	Liberal	1959
Patrick J. Canning	Placentia West	Liberal	1949
Stephen K. Smith	Port au Port	Liberal	1956
Eric N. Dawe	Port de Grave	Liberal	1962
James R. Chalker	St. Barbe North	Liberal	1949
William Smith	St. Barbe South	Progressive Conservative	1962
William J. Keough	St. George's	Liberal	1949
Anthony J. Murphy	St. John's Centre	Progressive Conservative	1962
James J. Greene	St. John's East	Progressive Conservative	1959
William J. Browne	St. John's East Extern	Progressive Conservative	1954, (Note: St. John's West) 1962
Geoffrey C. Carnell	St. John's North	Liberal	1962
G. Rex Renouf	St. John's South	Progressive Conservative	1957, 1962
William G. Adams	St. John's West	Liberal	1962
James M. McGrath	St. Mary's	Liberal	1956
Arthur S. Mifflin	Trinity North	Liberal	1956
C. Maxwell Lane (1963)	Trinity North	Liberal	1956, (Note: White Bay) 1963
Uriah F. Strickland	Trinity South	Liberal	1956
Leslie R. Curtis	Twillingate	Liberal	1949
Walter Carter	White Bay North	Liberal	1962
Frederick W. Rowe	White Bay South	Liberal	1952

== By-elections ==
By-elections were held to replace members for various reasons:

Electoral district	Member elected	Affiliation	Election date	Reason
Trinity North	C. Maxwell Lane	Liberal	February 18, 1963	A Mifflin named to Supreme Court
