= 35th General Assembly of Newfoundland =

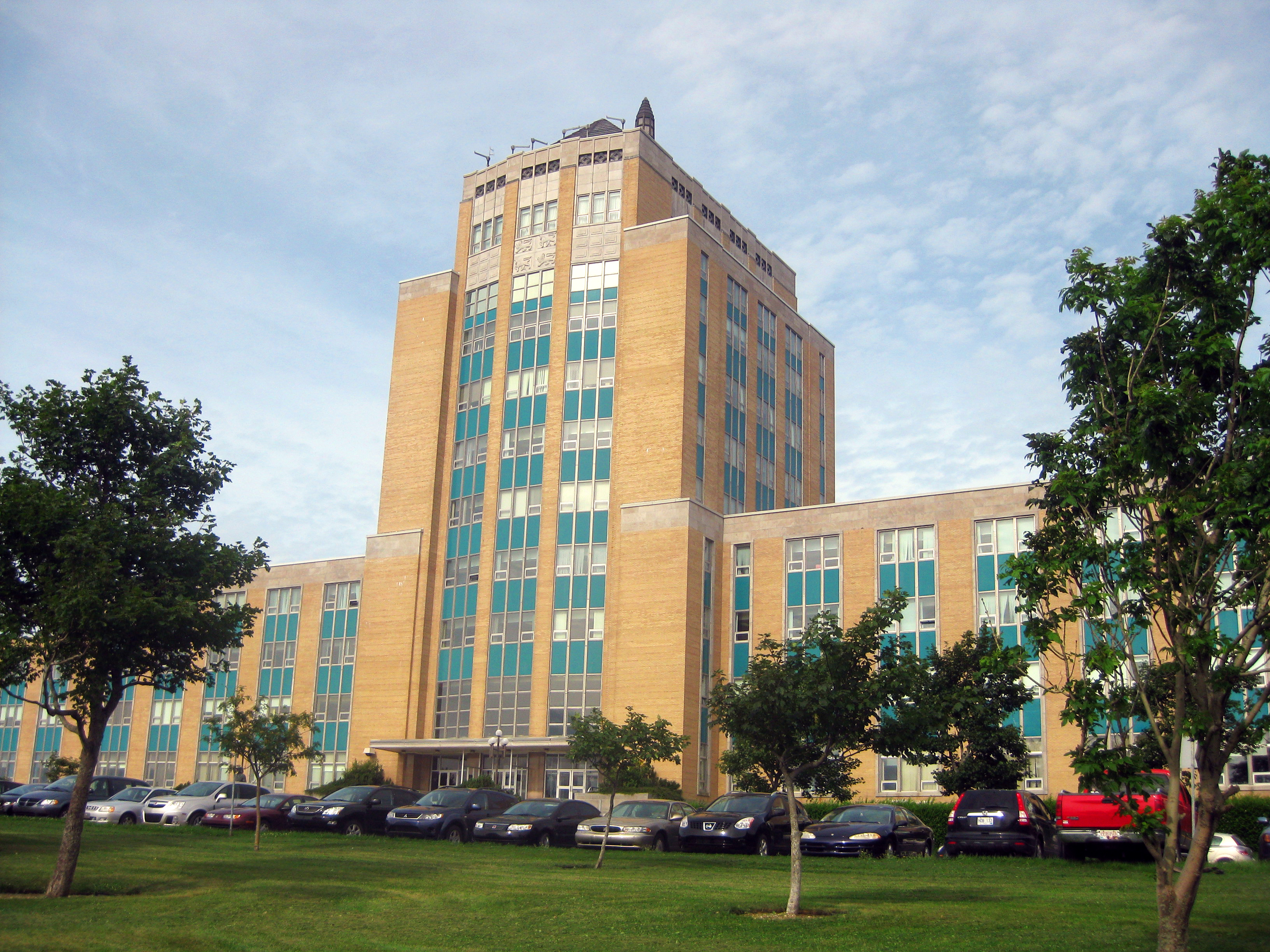
- Confederation Building East Block. Seat of the Newfoundland and Labrador government and the House of Assembly from 1960 to present.

History
- Founded: March 1, 1972
- Disbanded: March 1, 1972
- Preceded by: 34th General Assembly of Newfoundland
- Succeeded by: 36th General Assembly of Newfoundland

Elections
- Last election: 1971 Newfoundland general election

The members of the 35th General Assembly of Newfoundland were elected in the Newfoundland general election held in October 1971. The votes were evenly divided between the Liberal Party and the Progressive Conservatives.

The election resulted in a hung parliament where neither party was able to form a stable government.

There was one session of the 35th General Assembly:

Session	Start	End
1st	March 1, 1972	March 1, 1972

Ewart John Arlington Harnum served as lieutenant governor of Newfoundland.

== Members of the Assembly ==
The following members were elected to the assembly in 1971:

Member	Electoral district	Party	First elected / previously elected
William P. Saunders (Note: Resigned seat.)	Bay de Verde	Liberal	1962
Stephen A. Neary	Bell Island	Liberal	1962
Paul S. Thoms	Bonavista North	Liberal	1971
Ross Barbour	Bonavista South	Liberal	1959
Allan Evans	Burgeo and La Poile	Progressive Conservative	1971
T. Alexander Hickman	Burin	Progressive Conservative	1966 (Note: First Elected as a Liberal)
Augustus T. Rowe	Carbonear	Progressive Conservative	1971
Thomas Doyle	Ferryland	Progressive Conservative	1971
Earl S. Winsor	Fogo	Liberal	1956
W. Augustus Oldford	Fortune Bay	Liberal	1971
Harold Collins	Gander	Progressive Conservative	1967
Aubrey Senior	Grand Falls	Progressive Conservative	1971
Harold Starkes	Green Bay	Liberal	1962
Hubert Kitchen	Harbour Grace	Liberal	1971
Gordon Dawe	Harbour Main	Progressive Conservative	1971
William Doody	Harbour Main	Progressive Conservative	1971
Harold Piercey	Hermitage	Liberal	1971
Thomas C. Farrell	Humber East	Progressive Conservative	1971
Frank D. Moores	Humber West	Progressive Conservative	1971
Melvin Woodward	Labrador North	Liberal	1971
Joe Harvey	Labrador South	Liberal	1971
Thomas W. Burgess	Labrador West	New Labrador Party	1966
Thomas W. Burgess	Labrador West	Liberal	1966
James Russell	Lewisporte	Progressive Conservative	1971
Joseph R. Smallwood	Placentia East	Liberal	1949
Patrick J. Canning	Placentia West	Liberal	1949
Frederick R. Stagg	Port au Port	Progressive Conservative	1971
James J. Hussey	Port de Grave	Liberal	1971
James R. Chalker	St. Barbe North	Liberal	1949
Edward Maynard	St. Barbe South	Progressive Conservative	1971
Alexander Dunphy	St. George's	Progressive Conservative	1971
Anthony J. Murphy	St. John's Centre	Progressive Conservative	1962
William Marshall	St. John's East	Progressive Conservative	1970
Thomas V. Hickey	St. John's East Extern	Progressive Conservative	1966
John A. Carter	St. John's North	Progressive Conservative	1971
Hugh J. Shea (Note: Joined Liberals)	St. John's South	Progressive Conservative	1971
Hugh J. Shea	St. John's South	Independent	1971
Hugh J. Shea	St. John's South	Liberal	1971
John C. Crosbie	St. John's West	Progressive Conservative	1966
Gerry Ottenheimer	St. Mary's	Progressive Conservative	1966, (Note: St. John's East) 1971
Uriah F. Strickland	Trinity North	Liberal	1956
Rupert Bartlett	Trinity South	Liberal	1971
William G. Adams	Twillingate	Liberal	1962, (Note: St. John's West) 1971
Edward M. Roberts	White Bay North	Liberal	1966
William N. Rowe	White Bay South	Liberal	1966

== By-elections ==
None
