= Carbonear-Harbour Grace =

Former provincial electoral district in Newfoundland and Labrador, Canada

Newfoundland and Labrador electoral district
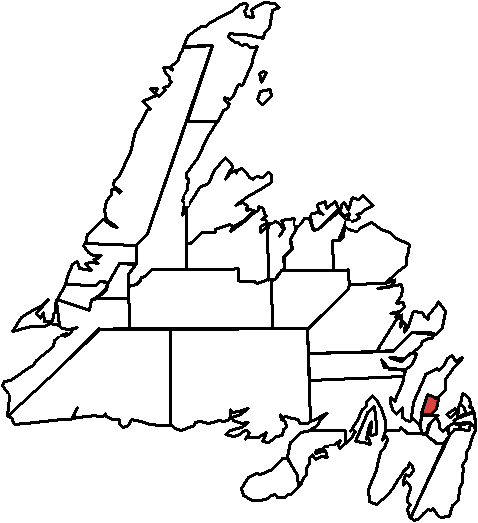
- Carbonear-Harbour Grace in relation to other district in Newfoundland

Defunct provincial electoral district
- Legislature: Newfoundland and Labrador House of Assembly
- District created: 1995
- First contested: 1996
- Last contested: 2013

Demographics
- Population (2006): 12,051
- Electors (2011): 9,205

Carbonear-Harbour Grace is a defunct provincial electoral district for the House of Assembly of Newfoundland and Labrador, Canada. In 2011 there were 9,205 eligible voters living within the district.

Being a regional services centre heavily influences the district's economy. Communities include: Carbonear, Harbour Grace, Bristol's Hope, Bryant's Cove, Freshwater, Harbour Grace South, Riverhead, Spaniard's Bay, Tilton Upper Island Cove, and Victoria.

The provincial district was created in 1949 at the time of Confederation and was abolished in 2015. It was succeeded by the new districts of Harbour Grace-Port de Grave and Carbonear-Trinity-Bay de Verde.

== Members of the House of Assembly ==
=== Carbonear-Harbour Grace ===
Assembly	Years	Member	Party
Carbonear–Bay de Verde
29th	1949–1951	Herbert Pottle	Liberal
30th	1951–1956	Herbert Pottle	Liberal
31st	1956–1959	George W. Clarke	Liberal
32nd	1959–1962	George W. Clarke	Liberal
Carbonear
33rd	1962–1966	George W. Clarke	Liberal
34th	1966–1971	George W. Clarke	Liberal
35th	1971–1972	Augustus Rowe	Progressive Conservative
36th	1972–1975	Augustus Rowe	Progressive Conservative
37th	1975–1977	Rod Moores	Reform Liberal
37th	1977–1979	Rod Moores	Liberal
38th	1979–1982	Rod Moores	Liberal
39th	1982–1985	Milton Peach	Progressive Conservative
40th	1985–1989	Milton Peach	Progressive Conservative
41st	1989–1993	Art Reid	Liberal
42nd	1993–1996	Art Reid	Liberal
Carbonear–Harbour Grace
43rd	1996–1999	Art Reid	Liberal
44th	1999–2003	George Sweeney	Liberal
45th	2003–2007	George Sweeney	Liberal
46th	2007–2011	Jerome Kennedy	Progressive Conservative
47th	2011–2013	Jerome Kennedy	Progressive Conservative
47th	2013–2015	Sam Slade	Liberal

=== Harbour Grace ===
Assembly	Years	Member	Party
29th	1949–1951	James Chalker	Liberal
30th	1951–1956	James Chalker	Liberal
31st	1956–1959	Claude Sheppard	Liberal
32nd	1959–1962	Claude Sheppard	Liberal
33rd	1962–1966	Claude Sheppard	Liberal
34th	1966–1971	Alec Moores	Liberal
35th	1971–1972	Hubert Kitchen	Liberal
36th	1972–1975	Haig Young	Progressive Conservative
37th	1975–1979	Haig Young	Progressive Conservative
38th	1979–1982	Haig Young	Progressive Conservative
39th	1982–1985	Haig Young	Progressive Conservative
40th	1985–1989	Haig Young	Progressive Conservative
41st	1989–1993	John Crane	Liberal
42nd	1993–1996	John Crane	Liberal

== Election results ==
}

By-election, November 26, 2013 On the resignation of Jerome Kennedy, October 2, 2013
Party	Candidate	Votes	%	±%
Liberal	Sam Slade	2,769	50.42	+35.63
Progressive Conservative	Jack Harrington	2,313	42.12	-34.17
NDP	Charlene Sudbrink	410	7.47	-1.03
Liberal gain from Progressive Conservative		Swing		+34.90

2011 Newfoundland and Labrador general election
Party	Candidate	Votes	%	±%
Progressive Conservative	Jerome Kennedy	3,993	76.29	+1.38
Liberal	Phillip Earle	774	14.79	-10.31
NDP	Shawn Hyde	445	8.50	
Independent	Kyle Brookings	22	0.42	
Total valid votes		5,234		
Rejected		24	0.46	-0.56
Turnout		5,258	56.71	-10.69
Progressive Conservative hold		Swing		+5.85

2007 Newfoundland and Labrador general election
Party	Candidate	Votes	%	±%
Progressive Conservative	Jerome Kennedy	4,367	74.91	+28.80
Liberal	Paul Baldwin	1,463	25.09	-28.80
Total valid votes		5,830		
Rejected		60	1.02	
Turnout		5,890	67.40	
Progressive Conservative gain from Liberal		Swing		+28.80

2003 Newfoundland and Labrador general election
Party	Candidate	Votes	%	±%
Liberal	George Sweeney	3,699	53.89	-7.0
Progressive Conservative	John Babb	3,165	46.11	+12.73

1999 Newfoundland and Labrador general election
Party	Candidate	Votes	%	±%
Liberal	George Sweeney	4,132	60.86	+4.60
Progressive Conservative	Claude Garland	2,266	33.38	-6.06
NDP	Kevin Noel	391	5.73	+1.46

1996 Newfoundland and Labrador general election
Party	Candidate	Votes	%	±%
Liberal	Art Reid	3,846	56.26	
Progressive Conservative	George Faulkner	2,698	39.47	–
NDP	Linda Soper	292	4.27	

== See also ==
- List of Newfoundland and Labrador provincial electoral districts
- Canadian provincial electoral districts
