= First white child =

Marks the establishment of a European colony in the New World

The birth of the first white child is a concept that marks the establishment of a European colony in the New World.

== Americas ==
=== Vinland ===
Snorri Thorfinnsson is the first person of European descent believed to have been born in the Americas apart from Greenland. The site of his birth is not known, but scholars believe it may have been at any of Buzzards Bay, Massachusetts, the Long Island Sound, the Bay of Fundy, or L’Anse aux Meadows.

=== Canada ===
Jonathan Guy, the son of Newfoundland settler Nicholas Guy, was the first child born to English parents in Canada, and one of the first born in any part of North America within a permanent settlement. He was born on 27 March 1613 in Cuper's Cove, a settlement that has been continuously occupied since 1610 and where his family remained long after his birth. Some accounts of the legendary Sheila NaGeira place her firstborn at Carbonear in the 16th century.

Hélène Desportes is often cited as the first white child born in New France. She was probably born in 1620, to Pierre Desportes and Françoise Langlois, although there is some disagreement about whether she had actually been born in France before her family's arrival in the colony in 1614. Hélène's first cousin Eustache Martin was born in October 1621 in Quebec to Abraham Martin and Marguerite Langlois.

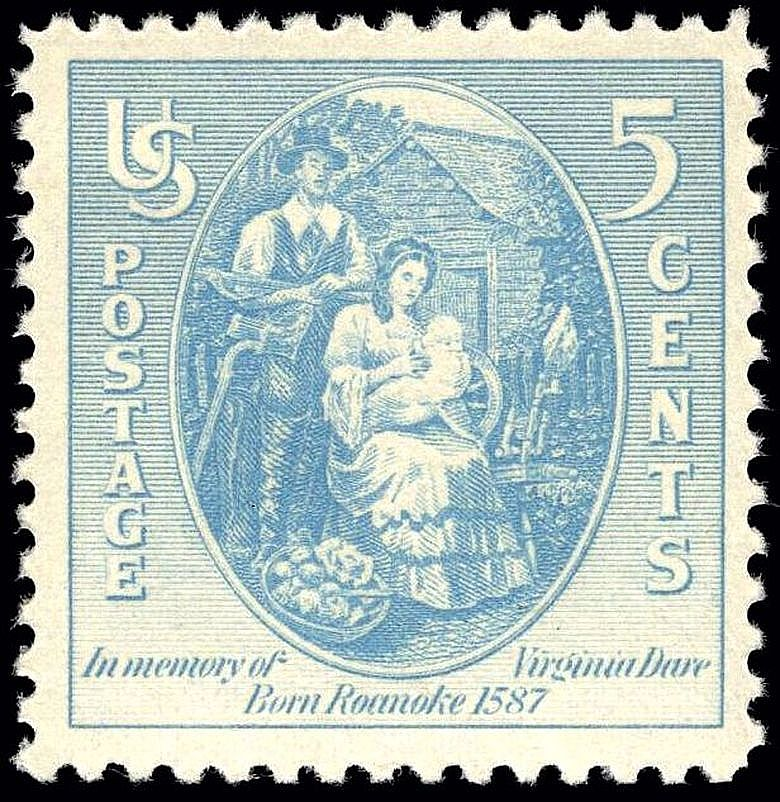
A 1937 United States stamp honoring Virginia Dare

At Port Royal, Acadia, in 1636, Pierre Martin and Catherine Vigneau, who had arrived on the passenger ship Saint Jehan along with 78 other migrants, were the first European parents to have a child in Acadia. The first-born child was Mathieu Martin. In part because of this distinction, Mathieu Martin later became the Seigneur of Cobequid (1699).

=== Mexico ===
The first white child in modern Mexico was likely born in the 1520s.

Earlier, Gonzalo Guerrero, a sailor from Palos, Spain, is presumed to have reached the New World aboard a Spanish expedition in the late 15th or early 16th century, which was shipwrecked along the Yucatán Peninsula. Around 1511, Guerrero became a war chief for Nachan Kaan, Lord of Chektumal, and married a rich Maya woman, with whom he fathered the first half-European children of Mexico. Guerrero and his wife's three children are widely deemed the first mestizos of the New World. (Note: By the first quarter of 1519, of the ten sailors who had landed in Yucatan and had not been ritually sacrificed in 1511, only Guerrero and Aguilar are thought to have remained alive (Chamberlain 1948, p. 15, González Hernández 2018, para. 4).)

=== United States ===
==== English descent ====
Virginia Dare, born in 1587 at the Roanoke Colony, was the first child born in North America to English parents, and her memory was celebrated in the British colonies. Virginia Laydon (b. 1609) was the first child in Jamestown, Virginia colony. Peregrine White, born aboard the Mayflower at Provincetown Harbor in 1620, was the first Pilgrim birth.

The first English-descended child born in Spanish Texas was Helena Dill Berryman, born in 1804 in what is now Nacogdoches County.

==== Dutch and Spanish descent ====
Martín de Argüelles Jr., born in the Spanish colony of St. Augustine, Spanish Florida, was the first child of European descent known to be born in what is now the continental United States. Born in 1566, his father was a hidalgo and one of the expeditioners who went to New Spain (modern Mexico) with Captain General Pedro Menéndez de Avilés in 1565. St. Augustine, Florida, is also the oldest continuously occupied European-founded city anywhere in the United States excluding Puerto Rico.

Sarah Rapelje, born on June 6, 1625 in Fort Orange (modern Albany) to parents born in the Dutch Republic, was the first white child born in New Netherland.

=== Brazil ===
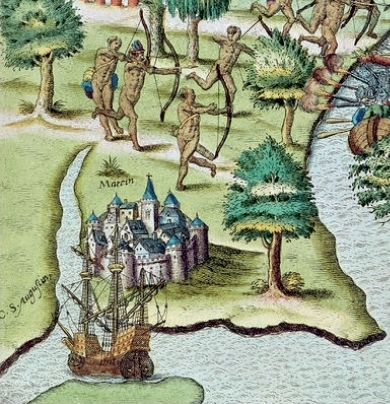
The former Castle of Duarte Coelho, built in 1536 in Olinda, was the first strong-house in Brazil. By Theodor de Bry.

The brothers Duarte Coelho de Albuquerque and Jorge de Albuquerque Coelho, born in Olinda, in the then Captaincy of Pernambuco, in 1537 and 1539, sons of the donatary captain, Duarte Coelho, and his wife Brites de Albuquerque, are considered the first white children from Brazil. Even though the discovery of Brazil took place in 1500, the arrival of European women had not yet occurred, and until then Brazil was occupied by white male sailors on ships, who had relationships with indigenous women, such as Caramuru and João Ramalho, who had the possible first mestizos in Brazil in the 1510s.

== Oceania ==
=== Australia and New Zealand ===
Seebaer van Nieuwelant (born 27 July 1623), son of Willemtgen and Willem Janszoon, was born south of Dirk Hartog Island, in present-day Western Australia. His father, not to be confused with the earlier Dutch explorer of the same name, was a midshipman from Amsterdam. He and his wife were aboard the Leijden, commanded by Claes Hermanszoon, which was charting the coast at the time. Their son's name in Dutch meant "sea-born of new land". (Note: From the journal of the Leijden (or Leyden): "On the 27th do. WILLEMTGEN JANSZ., wedded wife Of WILLEM JANSZ. of Amsterdam, midshipman, was delivered of a son, who got the name of SEEBAER VAN NIEUWELANT.")

The first European birth in New Zealand was Thomas Holloway King at the Rangihoua Bay settlement on 21 February 1815.

=== Polynesia ===
The first child born to European parents in Fiji was Augusta Cameron, born 5 December 1835.

The first white child in the Hawaiian Islands was Levi Sartwell Loomis who was born on 16 July 1820 in a grass hut in Honolulu, on the island of Oahu. his parents were Elisha and Mary Sartwell Loomis who were part of the first company of American missionaries which arrived on March 30, 1820, on the Thaddeus from Boston. On November 9, 1820, Sophia Moseley Bingham, Hawaii's first female white child, was born in Honolulu to American missionaries Hiram and Sybil Moseley Bingham.

== Africa ==
=== Rhodesia ===
Nada Burnham (1894–1896), daughter of the celebrated American scout Frederick Russell Burnham, was the first white child born in Bulawayo and died of fever and starvation during the Siege of Bulawayo in the Second Matabele War. She was buried in the Pioneer Cemetery in Bulawayo, Southern Rhodesia.

=== South Africa ===
Bernert Willemsz Wijlant (born 6 June 1652), the son of Barenz Wijlant, was the first white child born in the Cape Colony (modern South Africa).

== Political symbolism ==
The Washington Post noted in 2018 that the birth of Virginia Dare is a celebrated symbol among far-right and white nationalist currents. VDARE, an alt-right website associated with white nationalism, is named in her honor.

== Sources ==
- Calder, Robert (2017). A hero for the Americas : the legend of Gonzalo Guerrero. Regina, Saskatchewan: University of Regina Press. ISBN 9780889775091. OCLC 978286075.
- Chamberlain, Robert Stoner (1948). The conquest and colonization of Yucatan, 1517-1550. Carnegie Institution of Washington Publication 582. Washington, D.C.: Carnegie Institution of Washington. hdl:2027/txu.059173008409431.
- González Hernández, Cristina (2018). "Gonzalo Guerrero". Diccionario Biográfico electrónico. Real Academia de la Historia. Archived from the original on 24 March 2023.
- Heeres, Jan Ernst (3 January 2006) [1899]. Choat, Colin (ed.). The Part Borne by the Dutch in the Discovery of Australia 1606-1765. Project Gutenberg Australia. Wikidata Q132175190.
