= Sheila NaGeira =

Legendary Irish noblewoman

Sheila NaGeira, Sheila Mageila, Sheila Na Geira Pike, or Princess Sheila is a legendary 17th-century Irish noblewoman regarded in Carbonear, Newfoundland as an ancestor of the locally prominent Pike family.

== Legend ==
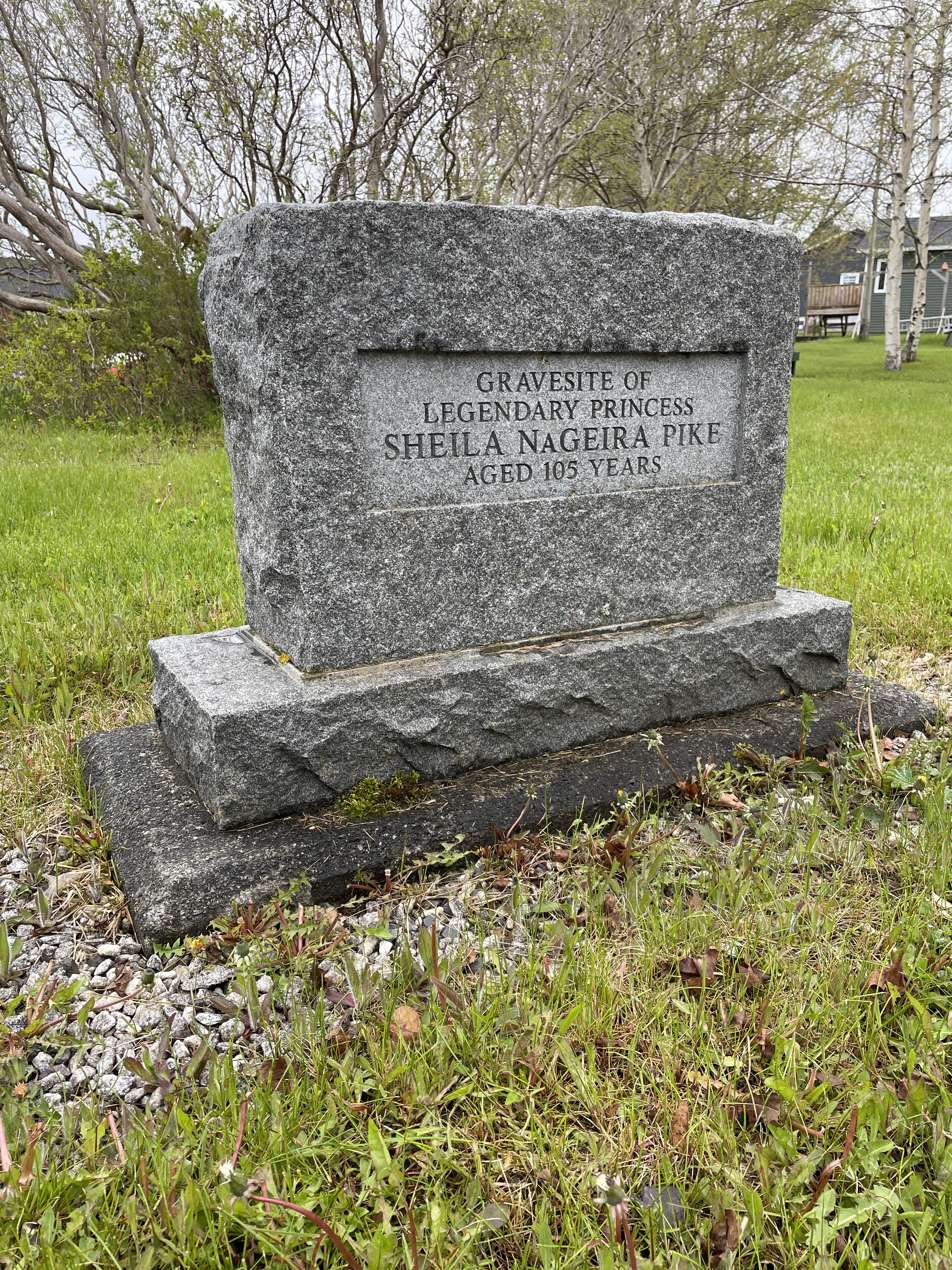
Gravesite of Legendary Princess Sheila NaGeira Pike Aged 105 Years

The family legend first appeared in print in a 1934 article on Harbour Grace by William A. Munn. It states that Sheila lived in the early 17th century and was from the recently dispossessed Gaelic nobility in Connacht. Catholic education being illegal in Ireland, she was sent to France to a convent school where her aunt was abbess. On the voyage there or back her ship was captured, first by a Dutch warship, and then by an English privateer captained by Peter Easton on its way to Newfoundland. En route Easton's lieutenant Gilbert Pike and Sheila fell in love; they landed at Harbour Grace, were married by the ship's chaplain, and settled first in Mosquito (now Bristol's Hope) and later in Carbonear.

Munn's 1934 version states that Sheila and Gilbert's firstborn was "the first white child in Newfoundland", predating Nicholas Guy's son born in 1613 at Cupids. Other versions reduce the scope to first white child in Carbonear or the west coast of Newfoundland, or extend it to all of Canada or British North America (where Virginia Dare was reputedly born in Roanoke Colony in 1587). In the 1940s, the story was broadcast several times by Joey Smallwood's radio show, The Barrelman, and included in a school reader, spreading it throughout Newfoundland. In 1958, P. J. Wakeham self-published Princess Sheila, a novel based on the legend, which sold 5,000 copies by 1960 and was republished in 1987 as The Legend of Princess Sheila. Many post-1960 versions of the legend incorporate elements of Wakehams' novel, such as Sheila's death aged 105.

The Pikes became a large family in Newfoundland, and many with a Pike in their family tree claim descent from Sheila. Linda Duncan, MP for Edmonton—Strathcona, said in the House of Commons of Canada in 2009:

My family's roots, beginning around 1610 in Mosquito Point and Carbonear, were based on the shipping industry. My ancestor, Gilbert Pike, was a buccaneer. ... The most famous person in Newfoundland, Sheila NaGeira, is my ancestor.

== Name ==
The given name Sheila is an anglicised spelling of the Irish name Síle (old spelling Sighile), itself originally a Gaelicisation of Celia or Cecilia which was later often equated with Julia. Sheila's second name is spelled Nagira in Munn's account. A baby girl in Carbonear was given the middle name Mageila in 1917 in honour of Sheila. All combinations of M or N with l or r are attested, while the middle vowel may be written i, e, a, ee, ei, or ie; together with the following r it may be pronounced /ɛr/, /ɛər/, /ɪər/, or /ɑr/ (respectively like ERRor, squARE, nEAR, or stARt). Two-word forms like "NaGeira" and "na Geira" are found.

In aisling poems, Síle Ní Ghadhra was a common name for Ireland personified as a woman in bondage awaiting a Jacobite rising. Eponymous examples are one written by Munster poet Tadhg Gaelach Ó Súilleabháin (1715–1795) and translated by James Clarence Mangan in 1849; another with the same metre translated by John D'Alton in 1831; and Ethna Carbery's Gaelic revival "Shiela ní Gara". Eugene O'Curry used the same personification in 1829 with reference to Catholic Emancipation. "Sheela na Guira", "Celia O'Gara", "Shillinaguira", and many other spellings, is a well-known Irish jig setting for the Ó Súilleabháin and D'Alton poems, attested from 1745.

"Ni Ghadharadh" (modern spelling Ní Ghadhra) is the feminine form of Ó Gadhra (O'Gara), surname of the chiefs of Luighne Connacht. Another "Sheela-na-Guira", or "Gillian Dwyer", was an O'Dwyer (Ní Dhuibhir) from Cullahill near Borrisoleigh in Munster, who ended centuries of family resistance to the Norman Burkes by marrying Walter Burke. Na Guira has also been interpreted as Maguire (Nic Uidhir, an Ulster name). In Maria Edgeworth's 1817 play The Rose, Thistle, and Shamrock, the English Miss Gallagher scolds Irish maid Biddy for combing her hair too roughly: "You ran it fairly into my brain, you did! you're the grossest! heavy handiest!—fit only to wait on Sheelah na Ghirah, or the like." Biddy is insulted, "though I don't rightly know who that Sheelah na Ghirah was, from Adam."

In 1978 Harold Horwood suggested that "Na-gaira" was not a surname but an Irish-language epithet meaning "the beautiful", and that Sheila's true surname was O'Conor, that of the Gaelic kings of Connacht. Hiscock suggests Horwood's "Na-gaira" is a misreading of mo ghile "my darling". A related elaboration of the legend is that Sheila's true name and lineage were kept secret in Newfoundland to avoid persecution.

== Historicity ==
Scholars are sceptical of the story. Elements are common to folk traditions elsewhere in North America. From the 1960s, older locals recounted to folklorists versions heard in their youth in the early twentieth century; there is no evidence of earlier currency. An 1892 letter on "Sheela-na-Guira" in an Irish journal describes her as "daughter of the head of the Connaught O'Garas, and a celebrated beauty", without reference to Newfoundland or Pike. The first Pike recorded in Newfoundland is Thomas Pike at Carbonear in 1681. Ron Howell, chairman of the Carbonear Heritage Society, has written, "This lore of Sheila and Gilbert has no basis in recorded fact. ... It would give me great pleasure to know that someone discovered a credible, recorded, 17th or 18th century reference to either Sheila or Gilbert. I would suggest that anyone promoting the Sheila story note that it is folklore and not recorded history."

The putative grave of Sheila and Gilbert is on a site owned by the Pike family and descendants until acquired in the 1980s by the Royal Canadian Legion. In 1982 the Canadian Conservation Institute gave the faded inscription on the extant gravestone as follows:

Here lieth the body of John Pike, Sen. who departed this life 14 July 1753, aged 63. Also Julian his wife, died 14 June 174[?] Aged 69.

== Commentaries ==
Philip Hiscock suggests that Smallwood valued the story as a foundation myth and its Catholic–Protestant marriage as "a metaphor for an unriven Newfoundland". Johanne Trew comments, "The gendering of the narrative is obvious: since the female Irish line is subsumed into the male English line, it is the English name/identity which remains visible."

== Culture ==
Princess Sheila appears, crowned, on the coat of arms of the town of Carbonear. The local theatre is the "Princess Sheila NaGeira Theatre". A tourist information notice is at the site her putative grave. Besides Wakeham's novel, works based on the story include the 1955 poem "The Ballad of Sheila Na Geira" by L. E. F. English; the musicals Sheila Na Geira: A Legend of Love and Larceny (1997) by Chuck Herriott, and The Princess & the Pirate (1998) by Gordon Carruth; and the children's book A Newfoundland Adventure by Dawn Baker. The heroine of Margaret Duley's 1941 novel Highway to Valour is named "Sheila Mageila Michelet", while "Sheila nGira" in Patrick Kavanagh's Gaff Topsails (1996) draws deeper on the legend.
