= Brendan Howard =

Canadian politician

The Honourable Brendan Howard MHA

Member of Parliament for Bay de Verde
- In office June 1972 – February 1975
- Preceded by: William Saunders
- Succeeded by: Fred Rowe

Personal details
- Born: Brendan Odilo Howard; 22 March 1931 Daniel's Cove, Dominion of Newfoundland
- Died: 20 March 2000 (aged 68)
- Party: Progressive Conservative
- Spouse: Elizabeth McCann
- Profession: politician

Brendan Odilo Howard (March 22, 1931 – March 20, 2000) was a politician in Newfoundland. He represented Bay de Verde in the Newfoundland House of Assembly from 1972 to 1975.

The son of Lawrence Peter Howard and Margaret Kehoe, he was born in Daniel's Cove and was educated there and in Carbonear. In 1953, Howard married Elizabeth McCann.

He ran unsuccessfully for a seat in the Newfoundland assembly in 1971 but was elected in 1972.
