= Division No. 1, Subdivision I, Newfoundland and Labrador =

Bristol’s Hope
- Unorganized territory
- Bristol’s Hope
- Location within Newfoundland
- Coordinates: 47°43′03″N 53°11′19″W
- Country: Canada
- Province: Newfoundland and Labrador
- Census division: Division 1

Government
  - MHA: Riley Balsom (PC, Carbonear-Trinity-Bay de Verde)
  - MP: Paul Connors (LPC, Avalon)

Area
  - Land: 65.43 km^{2} (25.26 sq mi)

Population (2016)
  - Total: 299
  - Density: 4.6/km^{2} (12/sq mi)
- Time zone: UTC-3:30 (Newfoundland Time)
  - Summer (DST): UTC-2:30 (Newfoundland Daylight)
- Highways: Route 70

Bristol’s Hope is an unorganized subdivision on the Avalon Peninsula in Newfoundland and Labrador, Canada. It is in Division 1 and contains the unincorporated community of Bristol's Hope.

== Bristol's Hope ==
Bristol's Hope is the modern name of a community in the province of Newfoundland and Labrador, Canada. It is located on Conception Bay between Carbonear and Harbour Grace.

The place names Musket's Cove and Mosquito have been used since about the 1630s to refer to the area now called Bristol's Hope. The community was renamed in 1904 to commemorate the 1617 outpost of that name, an offshoot of the John Guy colony established at Cupids, ten miles away, in 1610.

The Plantation of Bristol's Hope was the second English colony in Newfoundland established by the Bristol Society of Merchant Venturers. It was a "sister" colony to Cuper's Cove, established in 1618 with a land grant from King James I of England, and was settled by some of the colonists from Cuper's Cove. Robert Hayman was the colony's only Proprietary Governor as this colony only existed until about 1631 before being abandoned. Although some accounts have the original colony centred at present-day Harbour Grace, the Plantation itself was much larger and included the modern location.

According to the 1677 Newfoundland Census, there were two households with permanent residences in "Musketa" consisting of thirteen family members and twenty-three servants. When the region came under attack from the French in 1697, their records list "Mosquit" as having "3 planters, 5 boats, and 2500 codfish".The current population is fewer than 200 people.

Possibly the settlement's most famous native-son was General Sir Henry Pynn, who fought under Wellington in the Peninsular War against Napoleon, and was the first native-born Newfoundlander to be knighted. His ancestor was one of the leaders in the successful defence of Carbonear Island against the French under D’Iberville in 1697.

=== Mosquito School House Registered Heritage Structure ===
This one-room schoolhouse was built by community residents between 1818-1828.
