= Richard Pike (mariner) =

British mariner

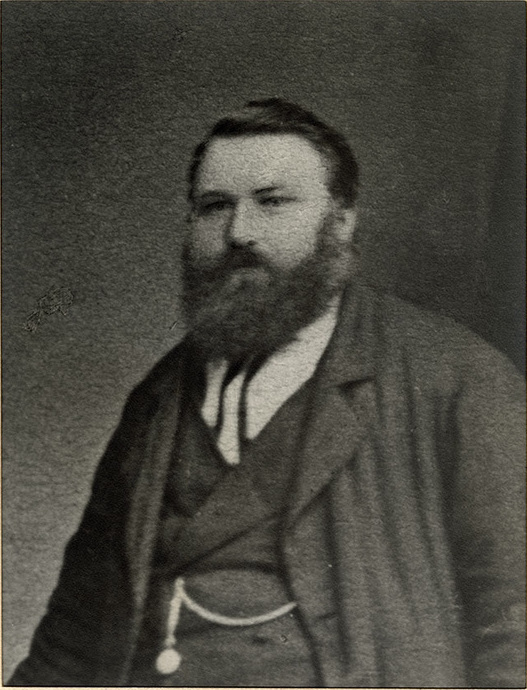
- Born: 1834; Carbonear, British North America
- Died: 4 May 1893 (aged 58–59)
- Occupation: Mariner

Richard Pike (1834 – 4 May 1893) was a British master-mariner.

== Biography ==
Pike was born in 1834 at Carboniere in Conception Bay, Newfoundland. He was brought up in the northern fisheries, in whaling and sealing, and in 1869 obtained command of a steamer engaged in that trade. In 1875 he was captain of the Proteus, a stout-built vessel of 467 tons and 110 horse-power, which in 1881 was chartered by the United States government to carry Lieutenant Adolphus Greely and his party through Smith Sound to Lady Franklin Bay. This was safely effected; and, in 1883, the Proteus, still commanded by Pike, was again chartered to carry out relief to the expedition, the United States ship Yantic being ordered to accompany her as a depot, as far as was prudent, but not to venture into the ice, for which she was not fitted. On 23 July, off Cape Sabine, the Proteus was nipped in the pack and sank almost immediately; no lives were lost, but there was scant time to save some provisions and clothes. Sometimes in the boats, sometimes painfully dragging them over the rough ice-floes, Pike and his companions succeeded, after extreme hardship, in reaching Upernavik, where they were taken up by the Yantic. For that year there was no relief to Greely's party; but the survivors were rescued in the following year. In 1891 Pike, in the steamer Kite, was engaged to carry Robert Peary and his party, which he put on shore in McCormick Bay in Murchison Sound (lat. 77 43' N.), and returned without misadventure. In the next year he brought the party back, and was to have taken Peary out again in the summer of 1893. The arrangement was cancelled by Pike's death, at St. John's, on 4 May. 'A typical Newfoundlander,' wrote his shipmates in the Kite, 'as active in mind and body as many men of half his years.' 'A quiet, unassuming man,' wrote a correspondent of the 'Times,' 'thoroughly capable and reliable, unequalled as an Arctic navigator, and in the front rank of our sealing captains.'
