= Sam Slade (politician) =

Canadian politician

Member of the Newfoundland and Labrador House of Assembly for Carbonear-Harbour Grace
- In office December 11, 2013 – November 27, 2015
- Preceded by: Jerome Kennedy
- Succeeded by: District Abolished

Personal details
- Party: Liberal
- Occupation: Politician, Fisherman

Samuel Slade is a Canadian politician. He was elected to the Newfoundland and Labrador House of Assembly in a by-election on November 26, 2013 and sworn in on December 11, 2013. He represented the electoral district of Carbonear-Harbour Grace as a member of the Liberal Party of Newfoundland and Labrador from 2013 until 2015. In 2015, Slade lost the Liberal nomination in Carbonear - Trinity - Bay de Verde to MHA Steve Crocker.

Prior to his election to the legislature, Slade was the mayor of Carbonear from 2005 to 2013. He ran for mayor again in 2017 but lost to Frank Butt. In 2021, Slade ran for councillor in Carbonear. He was elected and was sworn in as deputy mayor.

== Electoral record ==
By-election, November 26, 2013 On the resignation of Jerome Kennedy, October 2, 2013
Party	Candidate	Votes	%	±%
Liberal	Sam Slade	2,769	50.42%	+35.63
Progressive Conservative	Jack Harrington	2,313	42.12%	-34.17
NDP	Charlene Sudbrink	410	7.47%	-1.03
Liberal gain from Progressive Conservative		Swing		+34.90
