= George Sweeney (politician) =

Canadian politician

The Honourable George Sweeney ECNL

Member of the Newfoundland and Labrador House of Assembly for Carbonear-Harbour Grace
- In office 1998–2007
- Preceded by: Art Reid
- Succeeded by: Jerome Kennedy

Minister of Government Services and Lands
- In office February 17, 2003 – November 5, 2003
- Preceded by: Walter Noel
- Succeeded by: Dianne Whalen

Personal details
- Party: Liberal

George Sweeney is a former politician in Newfoundland and Labrador, Canada. He represented Carbonear-Harbour Grace in the Newfoundland and Labrador House of Assembly from 1998 to 2007 as a Liberal.

Born in Carbonear, he was educated in Harbour Grace and at the Carbonear District Vocational School. Before entering politics, Sweeney was an electrician and a community college instructor. He served as government whip and was a member of the provincial cabinet, serving as Minister of Government Services and Lands.

Sweeney has also served as president of the local chamber of commerce and was a founding director of Hospitality Newfoundland and Labrador.
