= Rod Moores =

Canadian politician

Rod Moores MHA

MHA for Carbonear
- In office 1975–1982
- Preceded by: Augustus Rowe
- Succeeded by: Milton Peach

Personal details
- Born: April 9, 1949 (age 77) Carbonear, Newfoundland
- Party: Reform Liberal (1975–1979); Liberal (from 1979)
- Occupation: Public servant

Roderick Moores (born April 9, 1949) was a Canadian politician. He represented the electoral district of Carbonear in the Newfoundland and Labrador House of Assembly from 1975 to 1982. He was a member of Joey Smallwood's Newfoundland Reform Liberal Party, but upon that party's dissolution in 1979 joined the Liberals. He was born at Carbonear.
