= Don Horwood =

Canadian former basketball coach

Don Horwood (born in Carbonear, Newfoundland) is a Canadian former basketball coach. He was the head coach of the University of Alberta men's basketball team from 1983 to 2009. Horwood is a three-time recipient of the Stuart W. Aberdeen Memorial Trophy as Canadian University Coach of the Year (1987, 1994, 2002).

== Career ==
A small forward, Horwood spent his playing career at the Memorial University of Newfoundland (1963 - 1968). He made his first stop of his coaching career at Brother Rice High School, St. John’s NL. (1968-69). In 1969 Horwood moved to British Columbia where he taught and coached at Oak Bay High School (1969-1978), guiding the team to British Columbia Provincial High School Championships in 1973, 1974 and 1977.

In the 1978-79 season, he served as assistant coach for the University of Alberta men's basketball team while attending graduate school.

Starting in 1979 and until 1983, Horwood coached at Spectrum High School in Victoria. In 1983, he was named head men's basketball coach at the University of Alberta. During his tenure, which ended in 2009, Horwood compiled an overall record of 587 wins and 346 losses, coaching the Golden Bears to CIS national titles in 1994, 1995 and 2002 and to championship game appearances in 1996 and 1999. He earned CIS Coach of the Year honours (Stuart W. Aberdeen Memorial Trophy) in 1987, 1994 and 2002 as well as Alberta Basketball Provincial Coach of the Year distinction in 1994 and 1995.

During the 1996 Olympic Games in Atlanta, he served as basketball colour commentator for CBC.

Horwood was inducted into the Oak Bay Secondary School Hall of Fame in 2004, the University of Alberta Sports Wall of Fame in 2013 and the Alberta Sports Hall of Fame in 2014. In 2008, he was presented with the City of Edmonton Salute to Excellence Award.
