= Milton Peach =

Canadian politician

The Honourable Milton Peach ECNL
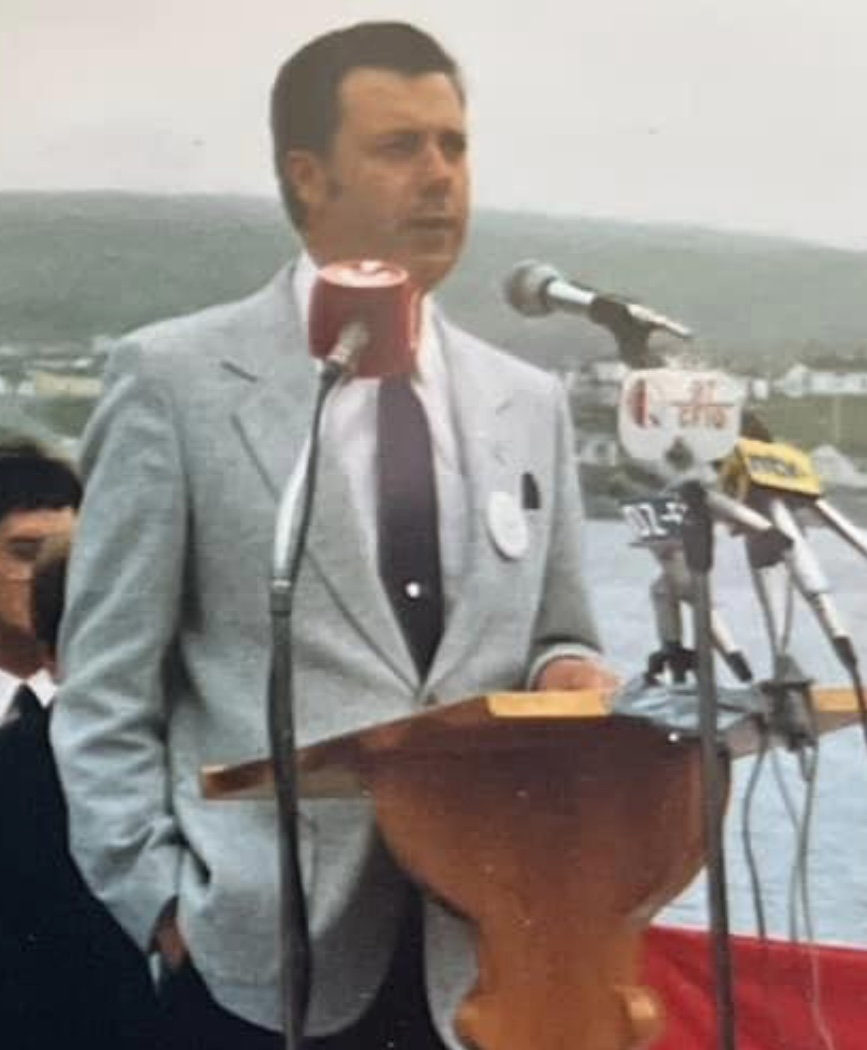
- Former Mayor of Carbonear, Milton Peach.

MHA for Carbonear
- In office 1982–1989
- Preceded by: Rod Moores
- Succeeded by: Art Reid

Mayor for Carbonear
- In office 1977–1982
- Preceded by: John Goff
- Succeeded by: Art Reid
- In office 1993–1997
- Preceded by: William Butt
- Succeeded by: Claude Garland

Personal details
- Born: December 5, 1943 (age 82) Small Point, Dominion of Newfoundland
- Party: Progressive Conservative Party of Newfoundland and Labrador
- Occupation: teacher, funeral director

Milton L. Peach (born December 5, 1943) was a Canadian politician. He represented the electoral district of Carbonear in the Newfoundland and Labrador House of Assembly from 1982 to 1989. He was a member of the Progressive Conservative Party of Newfoundland and Labrador. He was born at Carbonear. He holds B.A. and B.Ed. degrees and was a teacher. Peach was also Mayor of Carbonear from 1977 to 1982 and again from 1993 to 1997.
