= Art Reid =

Canadian politician

The Honourable Art Reid ECNL

Minister of Municipal and Provincial Affairs, Minister Responsible for NL Housing Corporation, And Registrar General
- In office May 19, 1993 – December 15, 1998
- Preceded by: William Hogan
- Succeeded by: Lloyd Matthews

MHA for Carbonear-Harbour Grace
- In office 1996–1998
- Succeeded by: George Sweeney

MHA for Carbonear
- In office 1989–1995
- Preceded by: Milton Peach

Personal details
- Born: October 17, 1947 (age 79) Carbonear, Dominion of Newfoundland
- Party: Liberal Party of Newfoundland and Labrador
- Occupation: educator

Arthur D. Reid (born October 17, 1947) was a Canadian politician. He represented the electoral district of Carbonear and Carbonear-Harbour Grace in the Newfoundland and Labrador House of Assembly from 1989 to 1998. He was a member of the Liberal Party of Newfoundland and Labrador. He was born at Carbonear. Prior to provincial politics, Reid served as a member of the Carbonear town council as deputy mayor and later mayor from 1982 to 1989.
