= Jerome Kennedy =

Canadian politician (born 1960)

The Honourable Jerome Kennedy ECNL KC

Minister of Finance, President of the Treasury Board
- In office 16 January 2013 – 2 October 2013
- Premier: Kathy Dunderdale
- Preceded by: Tom Marshall
- Succeeded by: Tom Marshall
- In office 31 October 2008 – 7 October 2009
- Premier: Danny Williams
- Preceded by: Tom Marshall
- Succeeded by: Tom Marshall

Minister of Natural Resources
- In office 28 October 2011 – 16 January 2013
- Premier: Kathy Dunderdale
- Preceded by: Shawn Skinner
- Succeeded by: Tom Marshall

Government House Leader
- In office 28 October 2011 – 19 October 2012
- Premier: Kathy Dunderdale
- Preceded by: Joan Shea
- Succeeded by: Darin King

Minister of Health
- In office 7 October 2009 – 28 October 2011
- Premier: Danny Williams; Kathy Dunderdale
- Preceded by: Paul Oram
- Succeeded by: Susan Sullivan

Minister of Justice And Attorney General
- In office 30 October 2007 – 31 October 2008
- Premier: Danny Williams
- Preceded by: Tom Osborne
- Succeeded by: Tom Marshall

Member of the Newfoundland and Labrador House of Assembly for Carbonear-Harbour Grace
- In office 9 October 2007 – 2 October 2013
- Preceded by: George Sweeney
- Succeeded by: Sam Slade

Personal details
- Born: 10 July 1960 (age 66) Carbonear, Newfoundland and Labrador
- Party: Progressive Conservative
- Spouse: Rachel Huntsman

Jerome Kennedy KC, (born 10 July 1960) is a Canadian lawyer and politician in Newfoundland and Labrador, who served in the cabinets of Premier Kathy Dunderdale and Danny Williams.

Kennedy was elected in 2007, as the Member of the House of Assembly (MHA) for the district of Carbonear-Harbour Grace. During his time he cabinet he held the posts of Minister of Finance, Minister of Natural Resources, Government House Leader, Minister of Health and Community Services, and as Minister of Justice and Attorney General. Before entering politics Kennedy was a high-profile criminal lawyer in St. John's.

== Early life and education ==
Kennedy was born and raised in Carbonear, Newfoundland and Labrador and is the oldest of nine children of Patrick and Flora Kennedy. He graduated from Memorial University of Newfoundland in 1981, with a Bachelor of Arts. He then earned a Bachelor of Laws degree from the University of New Brunswick Law School in 1984.

Kennedy was admitted to the Newfoundland Bar in 1985, and began practising criminal law full-time in 1989. Kennedy became a high profile and outspoken criminal defence lawyer in St. John's. He is well known for representing Randy Druken and Gregory Parsons during the Lamer Inquiry, which examined how the criminal justice system dealt with three discredited murder convictions.

== Politics ==
On 1 November 2006, Kennedy was the Progressive Conservative Party candidate in a by-election in the district of Signal Hill-Quidi Vidi, to replace outgoing New Democratic Party (NDP) leader, Jack Harris. Kennedy was unsuccessful in his bid for the seat, losing the election to Harris' successor as NDP leader, Lorraine Michael. After the loss he said that he had not given thought to running again in the future. However Kennedy ran for the Progressive Conservatives in the 2007 general election, this time he was elected to represent the district of Carbonear-Harbour Grace in the Newfoundland and Labrador House of Assembly.

=== Minister of Justice ===
Following the election Kennedy was appointed Minister of Justice and Attorney General. In the months following his appointment, Kennedy toured Her Majesty's Penitentiary, (HMP) and described the conditions at the prison as "appalling," he ordered a review of the NL prison system, and tasked Simonne Poirier, a retired warden of Dorchester Penitentiary in New Brunswick, and Gregory Brown, who had extensive experience in the field of prison management to complete the review. In late 2008, a report entitled: Decades of Darkness: Moving towards the light, was released, which painted a scathing review of the province's correctional services.

Kennedy served in the position of Attorney General for a year, during this time he tried to secure federal funding for a new prison for the province as well he worked at streamlining the operations of the criminal justice system.

=== Minister of Finance ===
Kennedy was appointed Minister of Finance, President of Treasury Board, Minister Responsible for the Public Service Secretariat and Minister Responsible for the Office of the Chief Information Officer on 31 October 2008, taking over for Tom Marshall who moved to Kennedy's old portfolio of Justice. Kennedy became minister just as the economy was seeing a downturn, due to the late-200s recession. In March 2009, he released his first budget titled; Building on Our Strong Foundation. Kennedy announced that the province recorded a $2.4 billion surplus during the 2008-2009 fiscal year and that the province's debt fell below $8 billion, but that they faced a $750 million deficit for the 2009-2010 fiscal year due to the recession. Kennedy's $6.7 billion budget put a significant focus on health and social services as well it included $800 million in infrastructure spending to stimulate the economy. Kennedy was also tasked with negotiating contracts with public sector employees. The government had agreed to giving workers a 21.5 per cent wage increase over four years and easily signed deals with the majority of the unions representing public sector employees. The province's nurses union however asked for a raise of more than 24 per cent over two years, plus an overhaul of starting and top wage scales. Kennedy told the nurses union that if they did not accept the 21.5 per cent wage increase over four years, given to other public sector employees, by 31 December 2008, that the government's offer may shrink due to the worsening economy. He later told nurses that "if forced to" the government would legislate nurses back to work if they chose to strike. After months of volatile negotiations Kennedy and the nurses union reached a tentative agreement on 26 May 2009, roughly two hours before nurses were expected on picket lines throughout the province. The four-year agreement, which was later accepted by nurses, included an across the board compounded pay raise of 21.5 per cent, plus new step increases for new nurses and senior nurses which represented a total pay increase of 31 per cent and 27 per cent respectively for these groups by the end of the contract.

=== Minister of Health ===
In October 2009, Kennedy succeeded Paul Oram as the Minister of Health and Community Services, after Oram announced his retirement from provincial politics. Kennedy's appointment coincided with the 2009 H1N1 flu pandemic. The province started rolling out their mass H1N1 vaccination toward the end of October, which temporarily suspended attention to other health services. While there was originally much confusion and controversy with the mass vaccination, Newfoundland and Labrador ended up vaccinating more of their residents than any other province in Canada. 69 per cent of Newfoundlanders and Labradorians were vaccinated, well above the national average of 41 per cent.

=== Minister of Natural Resources ===
Following his re-election in 2011, Kennedy was sworn in as the Minister of Natural Resources, Minister Responsible for the Forestry and Agrifoods Agency and Government House Leader. It was while Minister of Natural Resources and questioned why wind power was not being considered as a less expensive option than the Muskrat Falls hydro power development that he famously said in an interview "Wind is not a reliable source of power in Newfoundland."

=== Leadership ===
Kennedy had been thought of as a likely successor to former Premier Williams since entering politics in 2007. When Williams resigned as premier and PC leader on 25 November 2010, Kennedy was thought to be the frontrunner in the leadership race to succeed him. However, on 23 December 2010, Kennedy announced that he would not be seeking the leadership after discussing it with his family. Kennedy endorsed Dunderdale, who was later acclaimed leader of the party.

== Post-politics ==
In 2013, Kennedy joined personal injury law firm, Roebothan McKay Marshall, reviving his law practice.

== Electoral history ==
Carbonear-Harbour Grace - 2011 Newfoundland and Labrador general election
Party	Candidate	Votes	%	±%
Progressive Conservative	Jerome Kennedy	3,993	76.29%	–
Liberal	Phillip Earle	774	14.79%	
NDP	Shawn Hyde	445	8.50%	
Independent	Kyle Brookings	22	0.42%	

Carbonear-Harbour Grace - 2007 Newfoundland and Labrador general election
Party	Candidate	Votes	%	±%
Progressive Conservative	Jerome Kennedy	4367	74.91%	–
Liberal	Paul Baldwin	1463	25.09%	

Signal Hill-Quidi Vidi, By-Election - November 1, 2006
Party	Candidate	Votes	%	±%
New Democratic Party	Lorraine Michael	1968	55.2	+6.7
Progressive Conservative	Jerome Kennedy	1595	44.8	+1.0
