= Davis Earle =

Canadian physicist

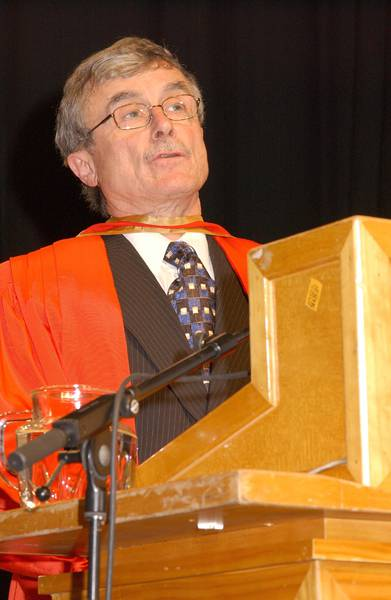
- Davis Earle accepting his honorary degree from Memorial University in 2004.
- Born: Eric Davis Earle; November 26, 1937; Carbonear, Dominion of Newfoundland, British Empire
- Died: December 24, 2016 (aged 79); Deep River, Ontario, Canada
- Scientific career
- Fields: Physics

Dr. Eric 'Davis' Earle (died 24 December 2016) was a Canadian nuclear physicist. A Rhodes Scholar, he worked at Chalk River and helped organize Sudbury Neutrino Observatory as part of the project team whose director, Arthur B. McDonald, won the 2015 Nobel Prize in Physics.

He received an honorary doctor of science degree from Memorial University of Newfoundland in 2004

== Early life ==
Davis was son of Mildred and Guy Earle, born November 26, 1937, and raised in Carbonear, Newfoundland. His father was the final captain of the SS Kyle and part-owner of the Earle Freighting Service. Davis said “My father tried to get me to join him in the codfish business in Carbonear, but I didn’t want to go work with my father at 20. I thought I needed to see a bit of Canada,” a goal that stuck with him throughout his life. Davis got his bachelor's of science degree at Memorial University, a master's degree at the University of British Columbia. In 1959 he became a Rhodes Scholar and completed his doctorate studies at Oxford in 1964.
