= Gunners Pond =

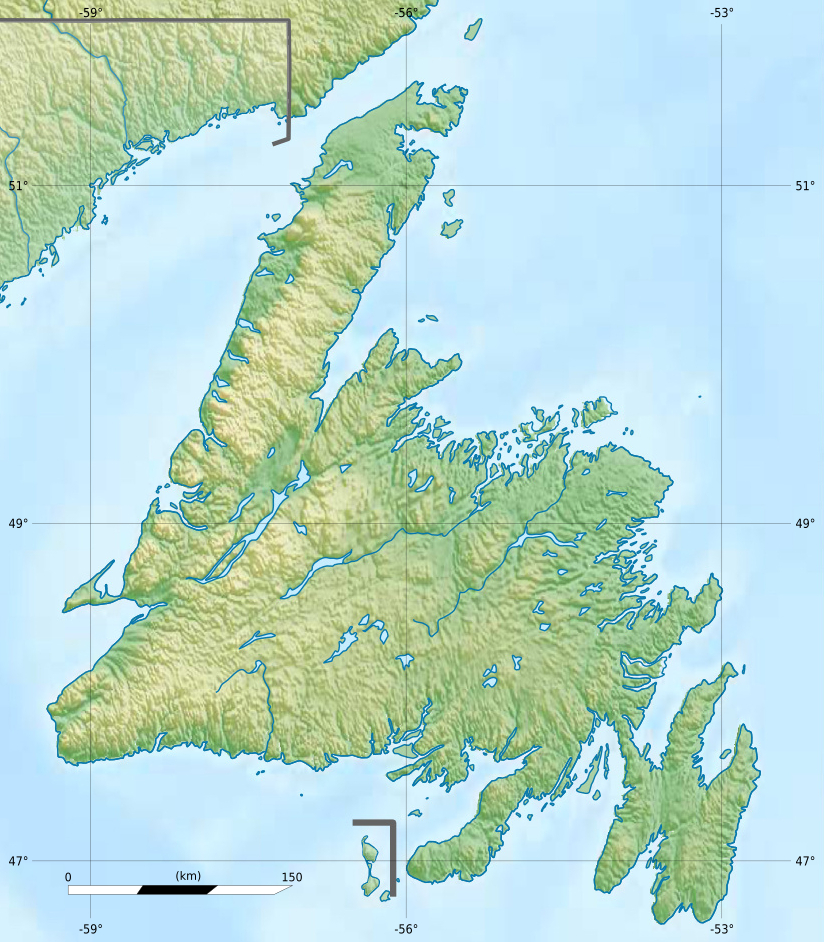
- Location within Newfoundland
- Location: Avalon peninsula, Newfoundland and Labrador
- Coordinates: 47°42′35″N 53°17′35″W
- Type: Pond
- Basin countries: Canada
- Max. length: 2,836 feet (864 m)
- Max. width: 1,450 feet (440 m)

Gunners Pond is a body of water located near Carbonear, Newfoundland and Labrador on the Avalon peninsula. The pond is approximately 2,710 feet (830 m) long and 1,335 feet (407 m) wide. It is accessible through a road from Carbonear and a bike trail connecting to Fox Farm Road. In the northwestern end of the pond, there is a section nicknamed "Tub's Harbour". It was nicknamed by local residents. There are 20 dwellings on the pond home to full-time residents and others are used as cabins.

Water flows into Gunners Pond from McCarthy's Pond and The Bower, while Gunners Pond flows into London Pond.

Gunners Pond
- Settlement
- Location of Gunners Pond in Newfoundland
- Coordinates: 47°42′35″N 53°17′35″W
- Country: Canada
- Province: Newfoundland and Labrador

Government
  - MHA: Steve Crocker (Lib)
  - MP: Ken McDonald (Lib)
- Time zone: UTC-3:30 (Newfoundland Time)
  - Summer (DST): UTC-2:30 (Newfoundland Daylight)
- Area code: 709
