= CHVO =

CHVO may refer to:

- CHVO-FM, a radio station (103.9 FM) licensed to Carbonear, Newfoundland and Labrador, Canada
- Centre Hospitalier des Vallées de l'Outaouais, a hospital in Gatineau, Quebec
