= Charbonnier =

Charbonnier is a surname, meaning "someone who sales or makes charcoal", and may refer to:

- Gaëtan Charbonnier (born 1988), French footballer
- Janine Charbonnier (1926–2022), French composer
- Jean-Baptiste Charbonnier (1764–1859), composer and organist
- Jean-Baptiste-Frézal Charbonnier (1842–1888), a Catholic missionary who was Vicar Apostolic of Tanganyika from January 1887 to March 1888
- Jean-François Charbonnier (1959–2020), French footballer
- Jean-Philippe Charbonnier (1921–2004), French photographer
- Lionel Charbonnier (born 1966), French football coach
- Louis Charbonnier (1754–1833), French general during the French Revolutionary Wars
- Nicolas Charbonnier (born 1981), French sailor and Olympic athlete
- Prosper Charbonnier (1862–1936), French naval officer and ballistics expert
- Stéphane Charbonnier (1967–2015), French caricaturist and journalist
