= Robert Duff (Newfoundland politician) =

Canadian politician

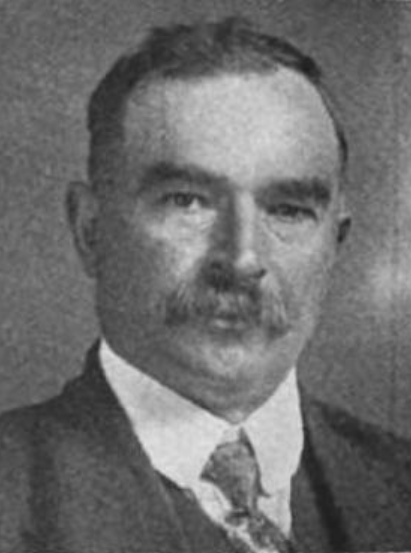

Member of the Newfoundland House of Assembly for Carbonear
- In office 1924–1928
- Preceded by: James Moore
- Succeeded by: James Moore

Personal details
- Born: Robert Duff; July 21, 1868 Carbonear, Newfoundland
- Died: October 11, 1928 (aged 60) Montreal, Quebec
- Party: Liberal-Progressive
- Spouse: Louisa C. Penney (m. 1896)
- Children: 4
- Parent: William Duff Sr. (father)
- Occupation: Merchant, politician

Robert Duff (July 21, 1868 – October 11, 1928) was a merchant and politician in Newfoundland. He represented Carbonear in the Newfoundland House of Assembly from 1924 to 1928.

== Biography ==
Born in Carbonear on July 21, 1868, Duff became a prominent business owner in the area. Duff was president of William Duff & Sons Ltd., the Public Service Electric Co., the Harbour Grace Marine Railway Dock Co. and the Conception Bay Mutual Marine Co. He was also a director of the Newfoundland Savings Bank.

Duff was elected to the Newfoundland assembly in 1924 as a Liberal-Progressive. In 1926, he transferred his support to the government of Walter Stanley Monroe and was made a minister without portfolio in the cabinet.

He married Louisa C. Penney in 1896 and they had four children.

He died in Montreal on October 11, 1928.
