= Augustus Rowe =

Canadian physician and politician (1920–2013)

Doctor Augustus Rowe

MHA for Carbonear
- In office 1971–1975
- Preceded by: George W. Clarke
- Succeeded by: Rod Moores

Minister of Health
- In office January 1972 – 1975

Personal details
- Born: August 2, 1920 Heart's Content, Dominion of Newfoundland
- Died: July 20, 2013 (aged 92) Toronto, Ontario, Canada
- Party: Progressive Conservative Party of Newfoundland and Labrador
- Occupation: physician

Military service
- Allegiance: Dominion of Newfoundland
- Unit: Royal Newfoundland Regiment
- Battles/wars: World War II

Augustus Taylor Rowe (August 2, 1920 – July 20, 2013) was a Canadian physician and politician. He served as a member of the Newfoundland and Labrador House of Assembly for Carbonear from 1971 to 1975. He also spent three years as the province's health minister within the cabinet of the former premier Frank Moores from January 1972 to 1975.

Rowe was born on August 2, 1920, in Heart's Content, Dominion of Newfoundland (the present-day province of Newfoundland and Labrador). He enlisted in the Royal Newfoundland Regiment during World War II. He completed medical school at St Mary's Hospital Medical School (which was part of the University of London at the time) in London following the war. He returned to Newfoundland and settled in Carbonear in 1954, where he began his medical career as a general practitioner.

In 1957, Dr. Rowe founded Carbonear's first hospital, Carbonear Community Hospital. He led the efforts to raise approximately $37,000 Canadian dollars to establish the new hospital, which provided regional patients which a local medical center. Previously, patients needing hospital treatment had to travel to St. John's or Old Perlican. Rowe served as the director of Carbonear Community Hospital from its opening in 1957 until October 1971, when he resigned upon his election to the House of Assembly.

Rowe was elected to the Newfoundland and Labrador House of Assembly as a MLA from Carbonear in October 1971 as a member of the Progressive Conservative Party of Newfoundland and Labrador. Rowe was re-elected to the House of Assembly in 1972. Rowe was appointed as provincial health minister within the cabinet of Premier Frank Moores from January 1972 to 1975.

He retired from politics in 1975 to pursue family medicine. He later joined the faculty of Memorial University of Newfoundland and became the university's chairman of Family Medicine from 1978 to 1985. A university honor, the Gus Rowe Teaching Award, which is bestowed by the Faculty of Medicine was named for Rowe.

He retired from the university in 1985 and moved to Toronto with his wife, Beatrice. He died in Toronto on July 20, 2013, at the age of 92. He was survived by wife of 68 years, Beatrice "Bea" (née Adams) Rowe; two children, David and Jane, and two grandchildren.
