= Janine Charbonnier =

French composer (1926–2022)

Janine Charbonnier (8 June 1926 - 28 May 2022) was a French composer, pianist, and piano teacher. She was born in Paris and married writer Georges Charbonnier.

She studied with Pierre Barbaud at the Paris Conservatoire and taught piano for several years. As an algorithmic composer, Charbonnier used mathematical principles and logic to organize the form and musical materials of her works. With Barbaud and Roger Blanchard, she co-founded the Groupe de Musique Algorithmique de Paris (GMAP). With the assistance of Bull Centre National Computing Electronics, they produced their first concert of algorithmic music, as part of an art festival at the Rodin Museum in Paris in June 1959.

== Works ==
Selected works include:

- La Varsovienne, electronic, 1965 (with Roger Blanchard)
- Circus, a theatrical musical based on a novel by Maurice Roche, 1973
- Réseaux aériens, for actors, piano, and harpsichord, 1962
- Exercice Op. 3, for woodwind quartet
- Prélude, Canon, Choral, for saxophone, trumpet, trombone, and tuba
- 01 Hommage à Leibniz, for chamber ensemble, 1966
- 01 10 Hommage à Leibniz, for chamber ensemble, 1970
- Filtres, for chamber orchestra, 1972
- Générateur I et II (Hommage à Blaise Pascal), for ensemble, 1962
- Hommage à Vera Molnar, for percussion, 1980
