= Carbonear Island =

Lighthouse in Newfoundland, Canada

Carbonear Island Lighthouse
- Location: Carbonear Island, Avalon Peninsula, Newfoundland and Labrador, Canada
- Coordinates: 47°44′24″N 53°09′22″W

Tower
- Constructed: 1878 (first), after 1955 (current)
- Construction: wooden tower and dwelling (first) steel skeletal tower (current)
- Shape: rectangular tower with balcony and lantern (first) triangular tower (current)
- Markings: white tower (first) white and red tower (current)
- Fog signal: deactivated

Light
- Focal height: 195 m (640 ft)
- Characteristic: Fl W 6s

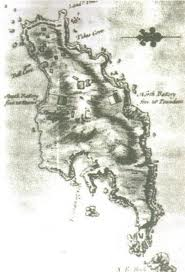
Map of fortification in 1750

Carbonear Island is a small uninhabited island on the Avalon Peninsula of Newfoundland, Canada. It is located at the mouth of Carbonear harbour. It became a strategic haven for the British settlers of Carbonear fending off the raids by the French and became known for a time as the "Gibraltar of Newfoundland".

While there is some evidence that the island may have at some time been occupied by First Nations people, the first documented reference to Carbonear Island was by Thomas Oxford of St. John's in 1679 when he requested that a fortress be erected on the island. In 1696 when Pierre Le Moyne d'Iberville had raided most of the settlements in Conception Bay and Trinity Bay, the residents of Carbonear and surrounding towns took refuge on the Island. During the Battle of Carbonear the abandoned town was burned but, thanks partially to fortifications they had erected with their own funds, the earth works walls of which are still evident, the residents were successful in defending the island from capture.

The second major attack came in 1705 led by Daniel d'Auger de Subercase. After failing an attack on St. John's, he moved on to destroy every town in Conception and Trinity Bays, with the exception of Carbonear Island. After almost sixty years of peace, for a brief period in the summer of 1762, the island was attacked and fell under the control of Count Joseph Louis Bernard de Clairons d'Haussonville, the fortifications burned and abandoned. The English quickly recovered the area and realized the need to develop their fortifications there. Carbonear Island continued to be an important refuge for settlers in the region during subsequent attacks from the French and later by American privateers until the early 19th century.

In 1878, a lighthouse and residence for year-round occupancy was erected on the northeast end of Carbonear Island and was maintained until c. 1928, when the lighthouse was staffed mainly by the Forward families. Subsequently, an automated light station was installed which is still in use. The Island is now a protected bird sanctuary sheltering various breeds of birds, including the bald eagle.

The Carbonear Islands' military importance was recognized in 1954, when they were designated a site of national significance, and in 1981, when they were declared a site of a nationally historic event. The first of a series of excavations began on the island in 2010 to learn more about its role in protecting British North America, and approximately 1300 artifacts were found in the first summer's dig.

== Demographics ==
Historical populations
Year	Pop.	±%
1901	10	—
1911	7	—
1921	7	—
2021	0	−100.0%
