= Herbert Pottle =

Canadian judge and politician

Minister of Public Welfare
- In office 1949–1955
- Preceded by: Himself as Commissioner of Public Welfare.

Commissioner for Public Welfare
- In office 1947–1949
- Preceded by: Herman William Quinton as Commissioner of Public Health and Welfare.
- Succeeded by: None, Commission of Government disbanded. Himself as Minister of Public Welfare.

Member of the House of Assembly for Carbonear-Bay de Verde
- In office 1949–1956
- Preceded by: None, district created.
- Succeeded by: George W. Clarke

Personal details
- Born: February 16, 1907 Flatrock, Newfoundland
- Died: September 21, 2002 (aged 95) Ottawa, Ontario, Canada
- Party: Liberal
- Spouse: Muriel Ethel Moran (m. 1937)
- Children: 2 daughters
- Parents: William Pottle (father); Patience Evely (mother)
- Education: Mount Allison University; University of Toronto
- Occupation: clinical psychologist

Herbert Lench Pottle (February 16, 1907 – September 21, 2002) was a Canadian politician, civil servant, magistrate and writer. He represented the electoral district of Carbonear-Bay de Verde in the Newfoundland and Labrador House of Assembly from 1949 to 1956. He was a member of the Liberal Party of Newfoundland and Labrador.

The son of William Pottle and Patience Evely, he was born in 1907 in Flatrock, Newfoundland and received his early education there. A clinical psychologist, he was an alumnus of Mount Allison University (B.A. 1932) and the University of Toronto (M.A. 1934, PhD 1937). Pottle married Muriel Ethel Moran in 1937; the couple had two daughters. He was employed by the Newfoundland Department of Education from 1939 to 1943. From 1943 to 1947, Pottle was a Child Welfare director and a judge in St. John's juvenile court.

From 1947 to 1949, he served in Newfoundland's Commission of Government as Commissioner for Public Welfare. He was elected to the provincial assembly in 1949 and served in the Newfoundland cabinet as Minister of Public Welfare. Pottle resigned from cabinet in 1955. He was subsequently named secretary for the United Church of Canada's board of information and stewardship, serving until 1963. From 1963 to 1972, he served in the Canadian Department of Health and Welfare.

He died in Ottawa in 2002 at the age of 95.

== Works ==
- Dawn without Light, political memoir (1979)
- From the Nart Shore, autobiography (1983)
- Humour on the Rock (1983)
