= Nicholas Guy =

Nicholas Guy (fl. 1612 – 1631) was one of the first settlers at the London and Bristol Company's Cuper's Cove, colony in Newfoundland, and was the father of the first English child born in Newfoundland and subsequently all of the country of Canada.

Most likely born in Bristol, England, Nicholas Guy was a member of the first group of settlers to journey to Newfoundland for colonization. In the winter of 1612 - 1613 there were sixty-two people were living in the colony, and during that winter eight deaths were recorded and one birth, a boy born to Nicholas Guy and his wife on 27 March 1613. It is believed that Guy relocated to the sister colony of Bristol's Hope when it was established in 1618. Sometime before 1630 Guy had moved again to Carbonear to fish, farm, and trap furs, on land belonging to Sir Percival Willoughby. A letter written by Guy to Willoughby on September 1, 1631 indicates that Guy had become Willoughby's agent in the development of his land, which consisted of the northern part of the peninsula between Conception and Trinity bays.

The Guy family remained the predominant planter family in Carbonear throughout the seventeenth century. The 1677 census lists both Jonathan Guy (probably Nicholas's son) and Nicholas Guy (likely Jonathan's son) living there with their families. Jonathan owned, among other things, four dwelling houses, two boats and a vegetable garden and kept seven head of cattle, eleven sheep and 3 hogs. Nicholas had one dwelling house and two boats and kept six head of cattle and 4 hogs.

Although unproven, it is likely Guy was a close relative of John Guy, the first Governor of Newfoundland.
