= Riley Balsom =

Canadian politician

Riley Balsom MHA

Member of the Newfoundland and Labrador House of Assembly for Carbonear-Trinity-Bay de Verde
- Incumbent
- Assumed office November 3, 2025
- Preceded by: Steve Crocker

Town Councilor for Heart's Content
- In office September 28, 2021 – October 2, 2025

Personal details
- Born: August 13, 1996 (age 30)
- Party: Progressive Conservative
- Education: Memorial University of Newfoundland (B.A.)

Riley Balsom (born August 13, 1996) is a Canadian politician from Newfoundland and Labrador. He was elected to the Newfoundland and Labrador House of Assembly in Carbonear-Trinity-Bay de Verde in the 2025 general election.

== Background and political career ==
Balsom is the only son of Rick and Petrina Balsom. He attended Memorial University of Newfoundland and graduated with a Bachelor of Arts degree in history. Before entering politics, he was a department manager at Walmart in Carbonear.

Balsom volunteered for over ten years as a member of the Progressive Conservative (PC) district association for Carbonear-Trinity-Bay de Verde. He was elected to the town council of Heart's Content in the 2021 municipal elections. Balsom then successfully ran for the provincial legislature in 2025.

On September 17, 2026, Balsom voted to approve the Churchill Falls Definitive Cooperation and Implementation Agreement (DCIA) in the House of Assembly along with the PC caucus.

== Election results ==
2025 Newfoundland and Labrador general election: Carbonear-Trinity-Bay de Verde
Party	Candidate	Votes	%	±%
Progressive Conservative	Riley Balsom	3,459	49.88	+22.18
Liberal	Danielle Doyle	3,085	44.48	-23.05
New Democratic	Kathleen Burt	242	3.49	-1.04
Independent	Alison Coffin	134	1.93	
Independent	Edward Thomas Cole	15	0.22	-0.03
Total valid votes		6,935		
Total rejected ballots				
Turnout				
Eligible voters				
Progressive Conservative gain from Liberal		Swing		+22.62
