= Harbour Grace South =

Coordinates: 47°40′43″N 53°12′57″W

Harbour Grace South is small community in the Canadian province of Newfoundland and Labrador. It is a neighbourhood within the town of Harbour Grace. It is located on the western shore of Conception Bay.

== See also ==
- List of communities in Newfoundland and Labrador
