= Abel Wornell =

Canadian businessperson, author and politician

Abel Charles Wornell (October 11, 1914 – October 11, 2004) was a businessperson, author and politician in Newfoundland. He represented Hermitage in the Newfoundland House of Assembly from 1966 to 1971.

The son of Edmund Wornell and Jessie Lush, he was born in Greenspond and was educated there, at Twillingate and at Memorial University College. Wornell began work with James Baird Ltd. and became manager of the Bell Island branch. He then was managing director for J. Petite and Sons Ltd. at English Bay West. Rideout later worked as a manufacturer's agent. He was a member of the Confederate Association in Newfoundland.

Wornell married Mildred Rideout; the couple had one daughter.

In 1966, he was elected to the Newfoundland assembly. Wornell was the author of two collections of poetry:

- Monarch of the Grump (1951)
- Rhymes of a Newfoundlander (1958)

He was a member of the Methodist College Literary Institute, also serving as its president. He won awards in the Newfoundland government Arts and Letters competition.

Wornell died on his 90th birthday.
