= Claude Sheppard =

Canadian politician and magistrate

MHA for Harbour Grace
- In office 1956–1966
- Preceded by: James Chalker
- Succeeded by: Alec Moores

Personal details
- Born: June 21, 1916 Spaniard's Bay, Dominion of Newfoundland
- Died: October 7, 2001 (aged 85)
- Party: Liberal Party of Newfoundland and Labrador
- Spouse(s): Florence Gosse (m. April 4, 1940)
- Occupation: businessman

Claude Asquith Sheppard (June 21, 1916 – October 7, 2001) was a Canadian politician and magistrate. He represented the electoral district of Harbour Grace in the Newfoundland and Labrador House of Assembly from 1956 to 1966 as a member of the Liberal Party of Newfoundland and Labrador.

The son of J.F. Sheppard and Mary V. Hiscock, he was born at Spaniard's Bay, Newfoundland and was educated there, at Bishop Feild College and at Memorial University. In 1940, he married Florence Gosse; with her, he had two children. Sheppard served overseas as a major in the Royal Artillery during World War II. He was a stipendiary magistrate from 1946 to 1956.

He was first elected to the Newfoundland assembly in 1956. Sheppard served as deputy speaker from 1963 to 1966. He retired from politics in 1966. Later that year, he was named manager of administrative services for the Newfoundland and Labrador Power Commission.
