= Carbonear-Trinity-Bay de Verde =

Provincial electoral district in Newfoundland and Labrador, Canada

Newfoundland and Labrador electoral district
- Carbonear-Trinity-Bay de Verde in relation to other districts in Newfoundland

Provincial electoral district
- Legislature: Newfoundland and Labrador House of Assembly
MHA
Riley Balsom
Progressive Conservative
- District created: 1975
- First contested: 1975
- Last contested: 2025

Demographics
- Population (2016): 14,724
- Electors (2014): 6,968

Carbonear-Trinity-Bay de Verde is a provincial electoral district of the House of Assembly of Newfoundland and Labrador, Canada. The district covers the eastern edge of Trinity Bay and the tip of Conception Bay. In 2011, there were 6,968 eligible voters living within the district.

The district includes the communities of: Bay de Verde, Cavendish, Carbonear, Grate's Cove, Green's Harbour, Hants Harbour, Heart's Content, Heart's Delight, Heart's Desire, Hopeall, Islington, Long Beach, Lower Island Cove, New Perlican, Northern Bay, Old Perlican, Perry's Cove, Red Head Cove, Salmon Cove, Spout Cove, Western Bay, and Winterton. In the 2007 redistribution, added a small chunk of Carbonear-Harbour Grace while losing 16 per cent of the district to Bellevue. The district was subject to redistribution in 2015.

== Members of the House of Assembly ==
The district has elected the following members of the House of Assembly:

Assembly	Years	Member	Party
Trinity South
29th	1949–1951	Maxwell Button	Liberal
30th	1952–1956	Maxwell Button	Liberal
31st	1956–1959	Samuel Hefferton	Liberal
32nd	1960–1962	Uriah Strickland	Liberal
33rd	1963–1966	Uriah Strickland	Liberal
34th	1966–1971	Uriah Strickland	Liberal
35th	1971–1972	Rupert Bartlett	Liberal
Trinity - Bay de Verte
36th	1972–1975	Jim Reid	Progressive Conservative
37th	1975–1979	Fred Rowe	Liberal
38th	1979–1982	Fred Rowe	Liberal
39th	1982–1985	Jim Reid	Progressive Conservative
40th	1985–1989	Jim Reid	Progressive Conservative
41st	1989–1993	Lloyd Snow	Liberal
42nd	1993–1996	Lloyd Snow	Liberal
43rd	1996–1999	Lloyd Snow	Liberal
44th	1999–2003	Lloyd Snow	Liberal
45th	2003–2007	Charlene Johnson	Progressive Conservative
46th	2007–2011	Charlene Johnson	Progressive Conservative
47th	2011–2014	Charlene Johnson	Progressive Conservative
47th	2014–2015	Steve Crocker	Liberal
Carbonear - Trinity - Bay de Verde
48th	2015–2019	Steve Crocker	Liberal
49th	2019–2021	Steve Crocker	Liberal
50th	2021–2025	Steve Crocker	Liberal
51st	2025–present	Riley Balsom	Progressive Conservative

=== Bay de Verde/Carbonear-Bay de Verde ===
Assembly	Years	Member	Party
Carbonear - Bay de Verde
29th	1949–1951	Herbert Pottle	Liberal
30th	1952–1956	Herbert Pottle	Liberal
31st	1956–1959	George Clarke	Liberal
32nd	1960–1962	George Clarke	Liberal
Bay de Verde
33rd	1963–1966	William Penman Saunders	Liberal
34th	1966–1971	William Penman Saunders	Liberal
35th	1971–1972	William Penman Saunders	Liberal
36th	1972–1975	Brendan Howard	Progressive Conservative

== Election results ==
=== Carbonear-Trinity-Bay de Verde ===
Graph of election results (minor parties that never got 2% of the vote or did not run consistently are omitted) View source data.

2025 Newfoundland and Labrador general election
Party	Candidate	Votes	%	±%
Progressive Conservative	Riley Balsom	3,459	49.88	+22.18
Liberal	Danielle Doyle	3,085	44.48	-23.05
New Democratic	Kathleen Burt	242	3.49	-1.04
Independent	Alison Coffin	134	1.93	
Independent	Edward Thomas Cole	15	0.22	-0.03
Total valid votes		6,935		
Total rejected ballots				
Turnout				
Eligible voters				
Progressive Conservative gain from Liberal		Swing		+22.62

2021 Newfoundland and Labrador general election
Party	Candidate	Votes	%	±%
Liberal	Steve Crocker	3,892	67.53	+7.25
Progressive Conservative	Frank Butt	1,596	27.69	-6.32
New Democratic	Matt Smith	261	4.53	-0.43
Independent	Edward Thomas Cole	14	0.24	-0.50
Total valid votes		5,763	99.41	
Total rejected ballots		34	0.59	
Turnout		5,797	51.55	
Eligible voters		11,246		
Liberal hold		Swing		+6.79
Source(s) "Officially Nominated Candidates General Election 2021" (PDF). Elections Newfoundland and Labrador. "NL Election 2021 (Unofficial Results)".

2019 Newfoundland and Labrador general election
Party	Candidate	Votes	%	±%
Liberal	Steve Crocker	4,292	60.3	-24.7
Progressive Conservative	Jason Oliver	2,422	34.0	+24.9
New Democratic	Kathleen Burt	353	5.0	-0.2
Independent	Edward Thomas Cole	53	0.7	+0.05
Total valid votes		7,120	100	
Total rejected ballots		42		
Turnout		7,162	66.6	
Eligible voters		10,759		

2015 Newfoundland and Labrador general election
Party	Candidate	Votes	%	±%
Liberal	Steve Crocker	4952	85.04	+19.51
Progressive Conservative	Tomás Shea	529	9.08	-19.98
New Democratic	David Coish	304	5.22	-0.19
IND	Ed Cole	38	0.65	
Total valid votes		5,823		
Liberal hold		Swing		

=== Trinity-Bay de Verde ===
Newfoundland and Labrador provincial by-election, 25 November 2014
Party	Candidate	Votes	%	±%
Liberal	Steve Crocker	3,074	65.53	+41.60
Progressive Conservative	Ronald Johnson	1,363	29.06	-32.86
New Democratic	Tolson Rendell	254	5.41	-8.74
Total valid votes		4,691		
Liberal gain from Progressive Conservative		Swing		+37.23

2011 Newfoundland and Labrador general election
Party	Candidate	Votes	%	±%
Progressive Conservative	Charlene Johnson	2,882	61.91	-10.02
Liberal	Barry Snow	1,114	23.93	+1.03
NDP	Sheina Lerman	659	14.16	+9.02

2007 Newfoundland and Labrador general election
Party	Candidate	Votes	%	±%
Progressive Conservative	Charlene Johnson	3,572	71.93	+8.73
Liberal	Bruce M. Layman	1,137	22.90	-9.47
NDP	Don Penney	257	5.18	+0.75

2003 Newfoundland and Labrador general election
Party	Candidate	Votes	%	±%
Progressive Conservative	Charlene Johnson	4,091	63.20	–
Liberal	Lloyd G. Snow	2,095	32.37	
NDP	Victoria Harnum	287	4.43	

1999 Newfoundland and Labrador general election
Party	Candidate	Votes	%	±%
Liberal	Lloyd G. Snow	3,201	54.0	
Progressive Conservative	Peter Bursey	2,176	36.7	–
NDP	Jeff Jacobs	320	5.4	
NLP	Monty Newhook	214	3.6	

1996 Newfoundland and Labrador general election
Party	Candidate	Votes	%	±%
Liberal	Lloyd Snow	3,765		
Progressive Conservative	Nellie Squires	2,554	–	–
NDP	Bill Hiscock	353		

1993 Newfoundland and Labrador general election
Party	Candidate	Votes	%	±%
Liberal	Lloyd Snow	2,617		
Progressive Conservative	Charles Lloyd Sparkes	1,662	–	–
NDP	Lucy Tuck	305		
Independent	Peter George Hiscock	257		

1989 Newfoundland and Labrador general election
Party	Candidate	Votes	%	±%
Liberal	Lloyd Snow	2,768		
Progressive Conservative	Wayne Quinlan	1,999	–	–
NDP	Bert Pitcher	189		
Independent	Bren Howard	84		

1985 Newfoundland and Labrador general election
Party	Candidate	Votes	%	±%
Progressive Conservative	James G. Reid	2,369	–	–
Liberal	Walter Brown	1,860		
NDP	Bert Pitcher	685		

1982 Newfoundland and Labrador general election
Party	Candidate	Votes	%	±%
Progressive Conservative	James Reid	2,700	–	–
Liberal	Phil Warren	2,087		

== See also ==
- List of Newfoundland and Labrador provincial electoral districts
- Canadian provincial electoral districts
