= Alec Moores =

Canadian politician

Alec D. Moores

MHA for Harbour Grace
- In office 1966–1971
- Preceded by: Claude Sheppard
- Succeeded by: Hubert Kitchen

Personal details
- Born: December 30, 1919 Blackhead, Dominion of Newfoundland
- Died: April 16, 2014 (aged 94) Harbour Grace, Newfoundland and Labrador
- Party: Liberal Party of Newfoundland and Labrador
- Occupation: businessman

Alec Douglas Moores (December 30, 1919 – April 16, 2014) was a Canadian politician. He represented the electoral district of Harbour Grace in the Newfoundland and Labrador House of Assembly from 1966 to 1971. He was a member of the Liberal Party of Newfoundland and Labrador. He was a businessman.
