= Aidan Maloney =

Canadian politician and executive (1920–2018)

Minister of Public Welfare
- In office August 8, 1966 – May 5, 1967
- Preceded by: Myles Murray
- Succeeded by: Beaton Abbott

MHA for Ferryland
- In office 1966–1971
- Preceded by: Myles Murray
- Succeeded by: Thomas Doyle

Minister of Community and social development and Minister of Fisheries
- In office May 25, 1967 – July 26, 1971
- Preceded by: C. Maxwell Lane
- Succeeded by: Earl Winsor

Personal details
- Born: August 12, 1920 King's Cove, Dominion of Newfoundland
- Died: March 16, 2018 (aged 97) St. John's, Newfoundland and Labrador
- Party: Liberal Party of Newfoundland and Labrador
- Occupation: executive

Aidan Joseph Maloney (August 12, 1920 – March 16, 2018) was a Canadian politician and executive. He represented the electoral district of Ferryland in the Newfoundland House of Assembly from 1966 to 1971. Maloney also served in cabinet as Minister of Fisheries, and as Community & Social Development. He was a member of the Liberal Party of Newfoundland and Labrador. Born in King's Cove, he was a business executive. Maloney died in March 2018 at the age of 97.
