= William Roger Callahan =

Canadian journalist and politician (1931–2022)

William Callahan

MHA For Port Au Port
- In office 1966–1971
- Preceded by: Stephen K. Smith
- Succeeded by: Frederick Stagg

Minister of Mines, Agriculture, And Resources
- In office July 17, 1968 – January 18, 1972
- Preceded by: C. Maxwell Lane
- Succeeded by: C. William Doody

Personal details
- Born: William Roger Callahan

William Roger Callahan (November 7, 1931 – April 6, 2022) was a Canadian journalist and politician in Newfoundland. He represented Port au Port from 1966 to 1971 in the Newfoundland House of Assembly.

== Biography ==
The son of William B. Callahan and Alice M. Rogers, he was born in St. John's and was educated there, in Corner Brook and at St. Augustine's Seminary in Toronto. From 1949 to 1953, he was a reporter and photographer for The Western Star in Corner Brook. Callahan next worked as the news director and later sports director for CJON Radio and TV. In 1956, he became editor for the newspaper on the Pepperrell Air Force Base. From 1959 to 1966, he was managing and editorial page editor for the Western Star. Callahan also served as senior executive at The Evening Telegram.

Callahan was elected to the Newfoundland assembly in 1966; Callahan served in the provincial cabinet as Minister of Mines, Agriculture and Resources. In 1971, he became publisher for The Daily News in St. John's.

Callahan married Daphne Marie Ryan; the couple had six children.

In 2015, he received a Lifetime Achievement Award at the Atlantic Journalism Awards.

Callahan was also the author of two books, Joseph Roberts Smallwood: Journalist, Premier, Newfoundland Patriot, and The Banting Enigma (both Flanker Press).

Callahan died on April 6, 2022, at the age of 90.
