= Eric Dawe =

Canadian businessman and politician

The Honourable Eric N. Dawe MHA

Minister of Municipal and Housing of Newfoundland and Labrador
- In office 1966–1971

Member of the Newfoundland and Labrador House of Assembly for Port de Grave
- In office 1962–1971
- Preceded by: Llewellyn Strange
- Succeeded by: George M. Wilson
- In office 1975–1979
- Preceded by: George M. Wilson
- Succeeded by: Randy W. Collins

Personal details
- Born: May 1, 1921 Bay Roberts, Newfoundland
- Died: October 8, 2015 (aged 94) St. John's, Newfoundland and Labrador
- Party: Liberal (1962–1971); Reform Liberal (1975–1979)
- Occupation: Business owner

Eric Neilson Dawe (May 1, 1921 – October 8, 2015) was a Canadian businessman and politician in Newfoundland. He represented Port de Grave in the Newfoundland House of Assembly from 1962 to 1971 and from 1975 to 1979.

== Early life ==
Dawe was born in Bay Roberts and was educated there and at Bishop Feild College. He joined the family hardware business in 1940 and took over management of the business six years later.

== Political career ==
Dawe took part in the push to incorporate Bay Roberts. He was elected to the first town council in 1951 and later served eight years as the town's mayor. Dawe also served as president of the Newfoundland Association of Mayors and Municipalities. He was elected to the Newfoundland assembly in 1962 and reelected in 1966. Dawe served in the provincial cabinet as Minister of Municipal Affairs and Housing.

He retired from the assembly in 1971 but was elected again in 1975 as a member of the Liberal Reform Party. In 1979, he became managing director of Avalon Coal, Salt and Oil Limited.

As of August 2012, Dawe was the only surviving member of the first town council for Bay Roberts.

== Death and legacy ==
He died at the age of 94 on October 8, 2015.

Eric Dawe Drive in Bay Roberts was named in his honour.
