= William Penman Saunders =

Canadian businessman and politician

The Honourable William Saunders MHA

Member of Parliament for Bay de Verde
- In office June 1962 – February 1972
- Preceded by: George Clarke
- Succeeded by: Brendan Howard

Personal details
- Born: William Penman Saunders; 15 September 1912 Carbonear, Dominion of Newfoundland
- Died: 1980 (aged 67–68) Carbonear, Newfoundland
- Party: Liberal

William Penman Saunders (September 15, 1912 – 1980) was a canadian business manager and politician in Newfoundland. He represented Bay de Verde in the Newfoundland House of Assembly from 1962 to 1971.

== Biography ==
The son of William and Ursula Saunders, he was born in Carbonear and was educated there. He managed Saunders Cooperage and the Carbonear branch of Harvey and Company Ltd. Saunders married Victoria Piercey; the couple had four children. He served on the municipal council for Carbonear from 1950 to 1958 and was mayor from 1958 to 1962.

Saunders was elected to the Newfoundland assembly in 1962 and was reelected in 1966 and 1971. However, in 1971, he resigned before taking his seat in the assembly which led to a tie in terms of number of seats held between the Liberals and Progressive Conservatives. A new election was called which resulted in a solid Conservative majority.
