= George Alain Frecker =

Canadian politician

Minister of Provincial Affairs
- In office 1964–1971

Minister of Education
- In office 1959–1964

Member of the Newfoundland and Labrador House of Assembly for Placentia East
- In office August 20, 1959 – October 28, 1971
- Preceded by: Greg Power
- Succeeded by: Joey Smallwood

Personal details
- Born: George Alain Frecker; June 29, 1905 Saint-Pierre, Saint Pierre and Miquelon
- Died: September 30, 1979 (aged 74) St. John's, Newfoundland, Canada
- Party: Liberal
- Spouse: Helena Mary McGrath
- Children: 8

George Alain Frecker, OC (June 29, 1905 – September 30, 1979) was a Canadian politician and academic administrator.

== Early life ==
Frecker was the son of George and Suzanna Frecker. He was born in St. Pierre in 1905 and moved to Halifax, Nova Scotia at the age of 13. He completed a B.Sc. in electrical engineering from the Nova Scotia Technical College in 1932 and a B.A. from Saint Mary's University in 1933.

== Career ==
Frecker moved to St. John's, Newfoundland in 1934 as the head of the Engineering Department at Memorial University College. He served as the Secretary of Education and the Deputy Minister of Education from 1944 to 1959. He resigned as Deputy Minister when he was elected to the Newfoundland House of Assembly for the district of Placentia East at the 1959 provincial election, serving as an MHA until 1971. During his time as MHA he served as the Minister of Education from 1959 to 1964 and the Minister of Provincial Affairs from 1964 to 1971.

He was the Chancellor of Memorial University of Newfoundland from 1972 to 1979. In 1972 he was presented with the Order of Canada medal of service for "excellence in all fields of endeavour in Canadian life". During his life he was awarded honorary degrees from St. Francis Xavier University, Saint Mary's University, Memorial University, Laval University and the University of Montreal.

== Family ==
He married Helena Mary McGrath; the couple had eight children.

== Death ==
Frecker died at the age of 74. After his death the Memorial University facility in St. Pierre was renamed l'Institut Frecker and a French choir in St. John's was renamed Chorale Frecker in his honour.

== Footnotes ==
Academic offices
Preceded by The Rt. Hon. The Lord Thomson of Fleet	Chancellor of Memorial University of Newfoundland; 1972-1979	Succeeded by Paul Desmarais
