= Walter Hodder =

Canadian educator and politician

Walter Harold Hodder (1909 – 1993) was an educator and politician in Newfoundland. He represented Burgeo and La Poile in the Newfoundland House of Assembly from 1962 to 1971.

Hodder was born in Ireland's Eye, Trinity Bay and was educated at Bishop Feild College, at Memorial University College and at Mount Allison University. He taught school for 33 years, mainly in small communities on Newfoundland's south shore; Hodder also provided first aid and medical advice when the district nurse was not available. He was principal of elementary and high schools in Port aux Basques. He served as president of the local branches for the Newfoundland Teachers' Association and the Red Cross. Hodder served as lieutenant in the Canadian Officer Training Corps for the Canadian Army.

He was elected to the town council for Channel-Port aux Basques in 1956 and served as mayor from 1958 to 1962. Hodder was elected to the Newfoundland assembly in 1962. He was defeated when he ran for reelection in 1971. After leaving politics, he became a salesman of radio and home entertainment equipment.

His son Jim also served in the provincial assembly.
