= Rossy Barbour =

Canadian politician

MHA for Bonavista South
- In office 1959–1971
- Preceded by: Uriah Strickland
- Succeeded by: Jim Morgan

Personal details
- Born: September 15, 1901 Newton, Newfoundland Colony
- Died: April 29, 1993 (aged 91) St. John's, Newfoundland and Labrador
- Party: Liberal Party of Newfoundland and Labrador
- Occupation: salesman

Roosevelt Ross Barbour (September 15, 1901 – April 29, 1993) was a Canadian politician. He represented the electoral district of Bonavista South in the Newfoundland and Labrador House of Assembly from 1959 to 1971. He was a member of the Liberal Party of Newfoundland and Labrador. Born in Newtown, Newfoundland and Labrador, he was a salesman.
