= George W. Clarke (Newfoundland politician) =

Canadian politician

The Honourable George W. Clarke MHA
- Clarke in 1961

29th Speaker of the Newfoundland House of Assembly
- In office 1963–1971
- Preceded by: John R. Courage
- Succeeded by: James Russell

Member of the Newfoundland House of Assembly for Carbonear Carbonear-Bay de Verde (1956–1962)
- In office October 2, 1956 – October 28, 1971
- Preceded by: Herbert Pottle
- Succeeded by: Augustus Rowe

Personal details
- Born: October 23, 1910 Carbonear, Newfoundland
- Died: October 9, 2000 (aged 89) St. John's, Newfoundland, Canada
- Party: Liberal
- Spouse: Frances Anna Penney (m. 1938)
- Children: 2 sons
- Education: Memorial University; Mount Allison University
- Occupation: lawyer, teacher

Military service
- Allegiance: Canada
- Branch/service: Royal Canadian Air Force
- Years of service: 1941-1945
- Battles/wars: Second World War

George William Clarke (October 23, 1910 – October 9, 2000) was a lawyer and political figure in Newfoundland. He represented Carbonear in the Newfoundland and Labrador House of Assembly from 1956 to 1971.

== Biography ==
Clarke was born on October 23, 1910 in Carbonear to Thomas Clarke and Amelia Clarke (née Poole). After graduating from Memorial University and Mount Allison University, Clarke taught school from 1928 until 1941, when he joined the Meteorological Service of the Royal Canadian Air Force. He served as a magistrate from 1946 to 1956. Clarke was called to the Newfoundland bar in 1962 and practised law in St. John's. He was speaker for the Newfoundland Assembly from 1963 to 1971, when he retired from politics.

Clarke retired from the practice of law in 1981. He died in St. John's in 2000.
