= 1959 Newfoundland general election =

Canadian provincial election

- August 20, 1959

36 seats of the Newfoundland House of Assembly 19 seats were needed for a majority
- Turnout: 69.3% (▲8.3% pp)
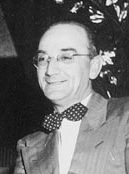
	First party	Second party
		PC
Leader	Joey Smallwood	Malcolm Hollett
Party	Liberal	Progressive Conservative
Leader since	1949	1953
Leader's seat	St. John's West (Note: Not the incumbent, but stood in this seat and won)	St. John's West (lost re-election)
Last election	32	4
Seats won	31	3
Seat change	▼1	▼1
Popular vote	75,560	33,002
Percentage	58.0%	25.3%
Swing	▼8.3pp	▼7.3pp
	Third party	Fourth party
	UNP	NDP
Leader	James Higgins	Ed Finn
Party	United Newfoundland Party	Newfoundland Democratic Party
Leader since	1959	1959
Leader's seat	St. John's East (lost re-election)	Ran in Humber West (lost)
Last election	pre-creation	pre-creation
Seats won	2	0
Seat change	▲2	Steady
Popular vote	10,639	9,352
Percentage	8.1%	7.2%
Swing	pre-creation	pre-creation
Premier before election
Joey Smallwood
Liberal
Premier after election
Joey Smallwood
Liberal

The 1959 Newfoundland general election was held on 20 August 1959 to elect members of the 32nd General Assembly of Newfoundland. It was won by the Liberal party.

== Results ==
Party	Leader	1956	Seats won	% change	Popular vote	(%)
Liberal	Joey Smallwood	32	31	-3.1%	75,560	58.0%
Progressive Conservative	Malcolm Hollett	4	3	-25%	33,002	25.3%
United Newfoundland	James Higgins	–	2	N/A	10,639	8.1%
Newfoundland Democratic Party (Note: The Newfoundland Democratic Party was founded by the Newfoundland Federation of Labour to run candidates as a protest against the Liberal government's decertification of the International Woodworkers of America in the course of the Newfoundland Loggers' Strike. This party was supported by the Co-operative Commonwealth Federation (CCF). The party went on to become the Newfoundland New Democratic Party in 1961.)	Ed Finn	0	0	0%	9,352	7.2%
Other		0	0	0%	1,772	1.3%
Totals		36	36	–	131,148	100%

== Results by district ==
- Names in **boldface type** represent party leaders.
- † indicates that the incumbent did not run again.
- ‡ indicates that the incumbent ran in a different district.

=== St. John's ===
Electoral district	Candidates				Incumbent
Electoral district	Liberal	PC	United (historical)	NDP	Incumbent
St. John's Centre; 60.74% turnout		Frank Fogwill; 2,631; 45.41%	Augustine Duffy; 2,860; 49.36%	Larry Daley; 303; 5.23%	Augustine Duffy
St. John's East; 71.88% turnout		James Greene; 2,949; 51.28%	**James Higgins**; 2,802; 48.72%		**James Higgins**
St. John's North; 76.19% turnout	George Nightingale; 3,056; 56.76%	Leslie Marshall; 1,910; 35.48%	Harvey Cole; 418; 7.76%		George Nightingale
St. John's South; 68.94% turnout		Rex Renouf; 2,859; 47.09%	John O'Dea; 2,997; 49.37%	Charles Devine; 215; 3.54%	Rex Renouf
St. John's West; 89.98% turnout	**Joey Smallwood**; 4,243; 65.64%	**Malcolm Hollett**; 2,221; 34.36%			**Malcolm Hollett**

=== Conception Bay ===
Electoral district	Candidates				Incumbent
Electoral district	Liberal	PC	United (historical)	NDP	Incumbent
Bell Island; 75.93% turnout	Joseph O'Driscoll; 1,385; 39.82%	Richard Greene; 1,631; 46.89%		Steve Neary; 462; 13.28%	Joseph O'Driscoll
Carbonear-Bay de Verde; 44.14% turnout	George Clarke; 2,359; 82.63%		James Evans; 496; 17.37%		George Clarke
Harbour Grace; 63.92% turnout	Claude Sheppard; 1,834; 70.11%	George Broomfield; 703; 26.87%	George Sweetapple; 79; 3.02%		Claude Sheppard
Harbour Main	Philip J. Lewis; 2,212; 29.82%	Albert Furey; 1,827; 24.63%	James Miller; 343; 4.62%	Alphonsus Dunphy; 173; 2.33%	Philip Lewis
Harbour Main	Matthew Whelan; 1,476; 19.90%	John Halley; 1,386; 18.69%	James Miller; 343; 4.62%	Alphonsus Dunphy; 173; 2.33%	Matthew Whelan
Port de Grave; 58.90% turnout	Llewellyn Strange; 1,703; 67.10%	Richard Parsons; 835; 32.90%			Llewellyn Strange

=== Avalon Peninsula ===
Electoral district	Candidates			Incumbent
Electoral district	Liberal	PC	NDP	Incumbent
Ferryland; 77.22% turnout	Myles Murray; 1,676; 59.06%	Otto Byrne; 1,162; 40.94%		Myles Murray
Placentia East; 75.16% turnout	Alain Frecker; 1,578; 54.19%	William Patterson; 1,217; 41.79%	Esau Thoms; 117; 4.02%	Greg Power†
St. Mary's; 77.58% turnout	James M. McGrath; 1,017; 57.23%	Thomas Howley; 760; 42.77%		James M. McGrath
Trinity South	Uriah Strickland; Won by acclamation			Samuel Hefferton†

=== Eastern Newfoundland ===
Electoral district	Candidates				Incumbent
Electoral district	Liberal	PC	NDP	Other	Incumbent
Bonavista North; 65.18% turnout	Edward Spencer; 3,399; 80.51%	Samuel King; 474; 11.23%	Kitchener Pritchett; 349; 8.27%		**Joey Smallwood**‡ (ran in St. John's West)
Bonavista South; 57.67% turnout	Rossy Barbour; 2,951; 73.83%	Gerald Hayley; 932; 23.32%		Albert Keel (Independent); 114; 2.85%	Uriah Strickland‡ (ran in Trinity South)
Fogo; 60.47% turnout	Isaac Mercer; 2,551; 77.73%	Whitfield Bannister; 422; 12.86%	Roosevelt Wellon; 309; 9.41%		Isaac Mercer
Trinity North; 56.31% turnout	Arthur Mifflin; 3,038; 72.26%	Milton Moores; 547; 13.01%		Sam Drover (Independent); 619; 14.72%	Arthur Mifflin

=== Central Newfoundland ===
Electoral district	Candidates					Incumbent
Electoral district	Liberal	PC	United (historical)	NDP	Other	Incumbent
Gander; 72.85% turnout	Beaton Abbott; 4,037; 70.64%	Robert Taylor; 639; 11.18%			James Mullett (Independent); 1,039; 18.18%	Beaton Abbott
Grand Falls; 71.57% turnout	Raymond Guy; 3,636; 80.85%		Stedman Inder; 397; 8.83%	James Hannaford; 464; 10.32%		Edward Spencer‡ (ran in Bonavista North)
Green Bay; 82.10% turnout	William Smallwood; 2,529; 78.61%	Roy Manuel; 497; 15.45%			Cyril Pelley (Independent); 191; 5.94%	William Smallwood
Twillingate; 71.10% turnout	Leslie Curtis; 2,692; 76.96%	Job Kean; 237; 6.78%		Raymond Rogers; 569; 16.27%		Leslie Curtis
White Bay South; 84.77% turnout	Frederick W. Rowe; 1,736; 79.67%			John O'Brien; 443; 20.33%		Frederick W. Rowe

=== Southern Newfoundland ===
Electoral district	Candidates			Incumbent
Electoral district	Liberal	PC	NDP	Incumbent
Burgeo-La Poile; 61.58% turnout	John Cheeseman; 2,458; 79.42%	Allan Evans; 637; 20.58%		John Cheeseman
Burin; 62.73% turnout	Eric Jones; 2,782; 79.35%	Henry Butler; 442; 12.61%	Cyril Strong; 282; 8.04%	Eric Jones
Fortune and Hermitage; 63.07% turnout	John Courage; 2,884; 75.24%	Eric Hiscock; 637; 24.76%		John Courage
Placentia West; 67.16% turnout	Patrick Canning; 2,307; 69.55%	Joseph Cheeseman; 1,010; 30.45%		Patrick Canning

=== Western Newfoundland ===
Electoral district	Candidates				Incumbent
Electoral district	Liberal	PC	United (historical)	NDP	Incumbent
Humber East; 77.46% turnout	John Forsey; 2,907; 55.19%	Tom Cahill; 992; 18.83%		Joseph Chaulk; 1,368; 25.97%	John Forsey
Humber West; 75.21% turnout	Charles Ballam; 3,101; 55.64%	Fred Clarke; 696; 12.49%		**Ed Finn**; 1,776; 31.87%	Charles Ballam
Port au Port; 81.97% turnout	Stephen Smith; 2,014; 61.16%	Michael Singleton; 815; 24.75%		Ambrose Rice; 464; 14.09%	Stephen Smith
St. Barbe; 83.53% turnout	James Chalker; 2,272; 65.76%	Wallace Maynard; 515; 14.91%		John McCool; 668; 19.33%	James Chalker
St. George's; 81.79% turnout	William Keough; 1,896; 63.67%	Alphonsus Pittman; 608; 20.42%	Richard White; 247; 8.29%	Gerald P. Byrne; 227; 7.62%	William Keough
White Bay North; 76.40% turnout	Maxwell Lane; 2,399; 88.69%	Robert Gillard; 265; 9.80%		Edgar Richards; 41; 1.52%	Maxwell Lane

=== Labrador ===
Electoral district	Candidates		Incumbent
Electoral district	Liberal	PC	Incumbent
Labrador North; 71.03% turnout	Earl Winsor; 832; 80.39%	William Moss; 203; 19.61%	Earl Winsor
Labrador South; 70.86% turnout	George Sellars; 1,061; 90.84%	Roderick Roberts; 107; 9.16%	George Sellars
