= 1956 Newfoundland general election =

Canadian provincial election

- October 2, 1956

36 seats of the Newfoundland House of Assembly 19 seats were needed for a majority
- Turnout: 61.0% (▼14.1%)
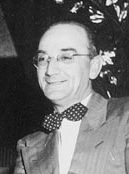
	First party	Second party
		PC
Leader	Joey Smallwood	Malcolm Hollett
Party	Liberal	Progressive Conservative
Leader since	1949	1953
Leader's seat	Bonavista North	St. John's West
Last election	24	4
Seats won	32	4
Seat change	▲8	Steady
Popular vote	75,883	36,591
Percentage	66.3%	32.0%
Swing	▲2.7pp	▼3.6pp
Premier before election
Joey Smallwood
Liberal
Premier after election
Joey Smallwood
Liberal

The 1956 Newfoundland general election was held on 2 October 1956 to elect members of the 31st General Assembly of Newfoundland. It was won by the Liberal party.

== Results ==
Party	Leader	1951	Seats won	% change	Popular vote	(%)
Liberal	Joey Smallwood	24	32		75,883	66.3%
Progressive Conservative	Malcolm Hollett	4	4		36,591	32.0%
CCF	Sam Drover	0	0		* (Note: CCF votes are among the 1,964 ballots categorized as "other".)	*
Other		0	0	0%	1,964	1.7%
Totals		28	36	-	114,438	100%

== Results by district ==
- Names in **boldface type** represent party leaders.
- † indicates that the incumbent did not run again.
- ‡ indicates that the incumbent ran in a different district.

=== St. John's ===
Electoral district	Candidates		Incumbent
Electoral district	Liberal	PC	Incumbent
St. John's Centre; 63.19% turnout	James Gibbs; 2,164; 35.99%	Augustine Duffy; 3,848; 64.01%	New district
St. John's East; 71.08% turnout	Edward Thorburn; 1,839; 32.60%	James Higgins; 3,802; 67.40%	James Higgins
St. John's East; 71.08% turnout	Edward Thorburn; 1,839; 32.60%	James Higgins; 3,802; 67.40%	Frank Fogwill†
St. John's North; 67.88% turnout	George Nightingale; 2,694; 56.32%	Derrick Bowring; 2,089; 43.68%	New district
St. John's South; 66.95% turnout	Hubert Kelly; 2,590; 43.93%	William Browne; 3,306; 56.07%	New district
St. John's West		**Malcolm Hollett**; Won by acclamation	William Browne‡ (ran in St. John's South)
St. John's West		**Malcolm Hollett**; Won by acclamation	**Malcolm Hollett**

=== Conception Bay ===
Electoral district	Candidates				Incumbent
Electoral district	Liberal	PC	CCF	Other	Incumbent
Bell Island; 69.52% turnout	Joseph O'Driscoll; 1,912; 60.05%	David Jackman; 901; 28.30%	Ray Littlejohn; 43; 1.35%	Michael Hawco (Independent); 328; 10.30%	New district
Carbonear-Bay de Verde; 59.38% turnout	George Clarke; 2,699; 70.14%	P. W. Crummey; 1,052; 27.34%	Stanley Atkins; 97; 2.52%		Herbert Pottle†
Harbour Grace; 70.23% turnout	Claude Sheppard; 1,714; 58.98%	Richard Parsons; 544; 18.72%	Israel Gosse; 41; 1.41%	Frank Archibald (Independent); 607; 20.89%	James Chalker‡ (ran in St. Barbe)
Harbour Main	Philip Lewis; 2,251; 30.55%	Arthur Harnett; 1,648; 22.37%			David Jackman‡ Harbour Main-Bell Island (ran in Bell Island)
Harbour Main	Matthew Whelan; 1,861; 25.26%	James A. McGrath; 1,608; 21.82%			Philip Lewis; Harbour Main-Bell Island
Port de Grave; 56.12% turnout	Llewellyn Strange; 1,853; 75.94%	John Pinsent; 587; 24.06%			Isaac Mercer‡ (ran in Fogo)

=== Avalon Peninsula ===
Electoral district	Candidates			Incumbent
Electoral district	Liberal	PC	CCF	Incumbent
Ferryland; 76.33% turnout	Myles Murray; 1,941; 69.22%	Rex Renouf; 863; 30.78%		Myles Murray
Placentia East; 62.55% turnout	Greg Power; 1,849; 76.82%		Esau Thoms; 558; 23.18%	Greg Power; Placentia-St. Mary's
St. Mary's; 75.67% turnout	James M. McGrath; 1,163; 67.50%	Larry Daley; 560; 32.50%		New district
Trinity South; 51.21% turnout	Samuel Hefferton; 2,419; 81.94%		Charles Bailey; 533; 18.06%	Maxwell Button†

=== Eastern Newfoundland ===
Electoral district	Candidates			Incumbent
Electoral district	Liberal	PC	CCF	Incumbent
Bonavista North; 57.17% turnout	**Joey Smallwood**; 3,429; 93.00%		Paul Thoms; 258; 7.00%	**Joey Smallwood**
Bonavista South; 50.32% turnout	Uriah Strickland; 2,490; 71.53%	Rossy Barbour; 905; 26.00%	Guy Dixon; 86; 2.47%	Clyde Brown†
Fogo	Isaac Mercer; Won by acclamation			Gordon Janes†
Trinity North; 50.15% turnout	Arthur Mifflin; 3,038; 88.65%		Solomon Drodge; 389; 11.35%	Samuel Hefferton‡ (ran in Trinity South)

=== Central Newfoundland ===
Electoral district	Candidates			Incumbent
Electoral district	Liberal	PC	Other	Incumbent
Gander; 68.97% turnout	Beaton Abbott; 4,045; 75.02%	Bennett Elliott; 1,347; 24.98%		New district
Grand Falls; 76.69% turnout	Edward Spencer; 2,680; 55.82%	Kevin Griffin; 2,121; 44.18%		Edward Spencer
Green Bay; 67.04% turnout	William Smallwood; 2,529; 78.61%	Roy Manuel; 497; 15.45%	Cyril Pelley (Independent); 191; 5.94%	Baxter Morgan†
Twillingate; 55.78% turnout	Leslie Curtis; 2,380; 87.05%	Arthur Butcher; 354; 12.95%		Leslie Curtis
White Bay South; 66.43% turnout	Frederick W. Rowe; 1,437; 84.23%		**Sam Drover** (CCF); 269; 15.77%	**Sam Drover**; White Bay

=== Southern Newfoundland ===
Electoral district	Candidates			Incumbent
Electoral district	Liberal	PC	CCF	Incumbent
Burgeo-La Poile; 64.47% turnout	John Cheeseman; 2,201; 68.14%	Allan Evans; 992; 30.71%	Willis Parsons; 37; 1.15%	George Norman†
Burin; 69.20% turnout	Eric S. Jones; 3,219; 83.96%	Frank Pearce; 615; 16.04%		Phillip Forsey†
Fortune and Hermitage; 64.46% turnout	John Courage; 3,337; 85.00%	Samuel Walters; 589; 15.00%		John Courage
Placentia West	Patrick Canning; Won by acclamation			Patrick Canning

=== Western Newfoundland ===
Electoral district	Candidates			Incumbent
Electoral district	Liberal	PC	Other	Incumbent
Humber East; 74.84% turnout	John Forsey; 3,058; 60.59%	Woodrow Hunt; 1,812; 35.90%	Darius Powell (Independent); 177; 3.51%	New district
Humber West; 78.57% turnout	Charles Ballam; 3,923; 61.11%	William Young; 1,860; 38.89%		Charles Ballam; Humber
Port au Port; 73.93% turnout	Stephen Smith; 2,019; 67.71%	William Goodyear; 963; 32.29%		New district
St. Barbe; 66.25% turnout	James Chalker; 2,187; 79.64%	Wallace Maynard; 559; 20.36%		Reginald Sparkes†
St. George's; 78.23% turnout	William Keough; 1,695; 59.49%	Richard White; 1,154; 40.51%		William Keough; St. George's-Port au Port
White Bay North; 75.05% turnout	Maxwell Lane; 2,414; 91.06%	James Tucker; 138; 5.21%	Gilbert Simms (CCF); 99; 3.73%	New district

=== Labrador ===
Electoral district	Candidates		Incumbent
Electoral district	Liberal	PC	Incumbent
Labrador North; 68.60% turnout	Earl Winsor; 873; 87.21%	Roderick Roberts; 128; 12.79%	Frederick W. Rowe‡ Labrador (ran in White Bay South)
Labrador South	George Sellars; Won by acclamation		New district
