= 31st General Assembly of Newfoundland =

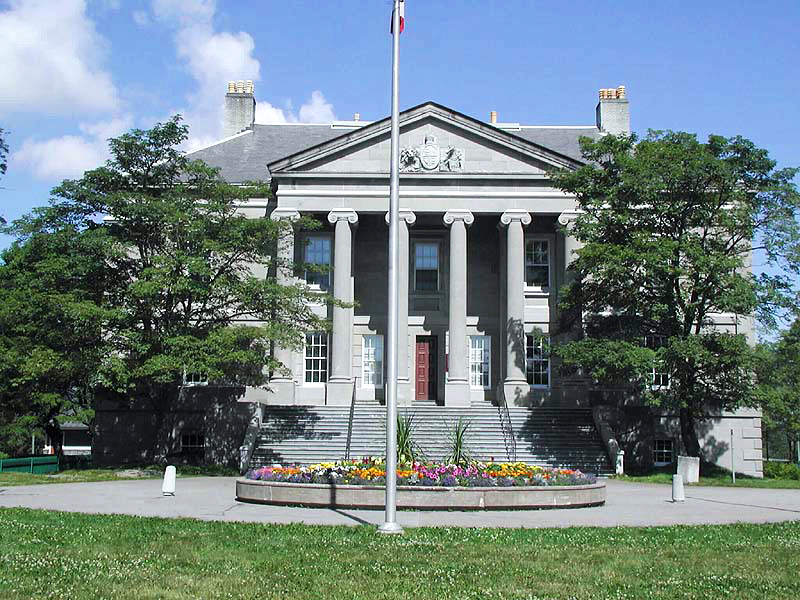
- Colonial Building seat of the Newfoundland government and the House of Assembly from January 28, 1850, to July 28, 1959.

History
- Founded: March 19, 1957
- Disbanded: July 28, 1959
- Preceded by: 30th General Assembly of Newfoundland
- Succeeded by: 32nd General Assembly of Newfoundland

Leadership
- Premier: Joey Smallwood

Elections
- Last election: 1956 Newfoundland general election

The members of the 31st General Assembly of Newfoundland were elected in the Newfoundland general election held in October 1956. The general assembly sat from March 19, 1957, to July 28, 1959.

The Liberal Party led by Joey Smallwood formed the government.

John R. Courage served as speaker.

There were three sessions of the 31st General Assembly:

Session	Start	End
1st	March 19, 1957	June 12, 1957
2nd	June 20, 1958	September 10, 1958
3rd	February 23, 1959	July 28, 1959

Sir Leonard Outerbridge served as lieutenant governor of Newfoundland until 1957. Campbell Leonard Macpherson succeeded Outerbridge as lieutenant governor.

== Members of the Assembly ==
The following members were elected to the assembly in 1956:

Member	Electoral district	Party	First elected / previously elected
Joseph P. O'Driscoll	Bell Island	Liberal	1956
Joseph R. Smallwood	Bonavista North	Liberal	1949
Uriah F. Strickland	Bonavista South	Liberal	1956
John T. Cheeseman	Burgeo and La Poile	Liberal	1956
Eric S. Jones	Burin	Liberal	1956
George W. Clarke	Carbonear-Bay de Verde	Liberal	1956
Myles P. Murray	Ferryland	Liberal	1952
Isaac Mercer (Note: Elected by acclamation)	Fogo	Liberal	1951
John R. Courage	Fortune Bay and Hermitage	Liberal	1949
Beaton J. Abbott	Gander	Liberal	1956
Edward S. Spencer	Grand Falls	Liberal	1949
William R. Smallwood	Green Bay	Liberal	1956
Claude A. Sheppard	Harbour Grace	Liberal	1956
Philip J. Lewis	Harbour Main	Liberal	1951
Matthew P. Whelan	Harbour Main	Liberal	1956
John A. Forsey	Humber East	Liberal	1956
Charles H. Ballam	Humber West	Liberal	1949
Earl W. Winsor	Labrador North	Liberal	1956
George Sellars	Labrador South	Liberal	1956
Patrick J. Canning	Placentia West	Liberal	1949
Stephen K. Smith	Port au Port	Liberal	1956
Llewellyn Strange	Port de Grave	Liberal	1956
James R. Chalker	St. Barbe	Liberal	1949
William J. Keough	St. George's	Liberal	1949
Augustine M. Duffy	St. John's Centre	Progressive Conservative	1951, (Note: Ferryland) 1956
James D. Higgins	St. John's East	Progressive Conservative	1951
George M. Nightingale	St. John's North	Liberal	1956
William J. Browne	St. John's South	Progressive Conservative	1954
Rex Renouf (1957)	St. John's South	Progressive Conservative	1957
Malcolm M. Hollett	St. John's West	Progressive Conservative	1952
James M. McGrath	St. Mary's	Liberal	1956
Arthur S. Mifflin	Trinity North	Liberal	1956
Samuel J. Hefferton	Trinity South	Liberal	1949
Leslie R. Curtis	Twillingate	Liberal	1949
C. Maxwell Lane	White Bay North	Liberal	1956
Frederick W. Rowe	White Bay South	Liberal	1952

Gregory Power was elected as a Liberal in Placentia East in 1956. He was first elected to the House of Assembly in 1951.

== By-elections ==
By-elections were held to replace members for various reasons:

Electoral district	Member elected	Affiliation	Election date	Reason
St. John's South	Rex Renouf	Progressive Conservative	June 18, 1957	W J Browne resigned in 1957 to run for federal seat
