= 32nd General Assembly of Newfoundland =

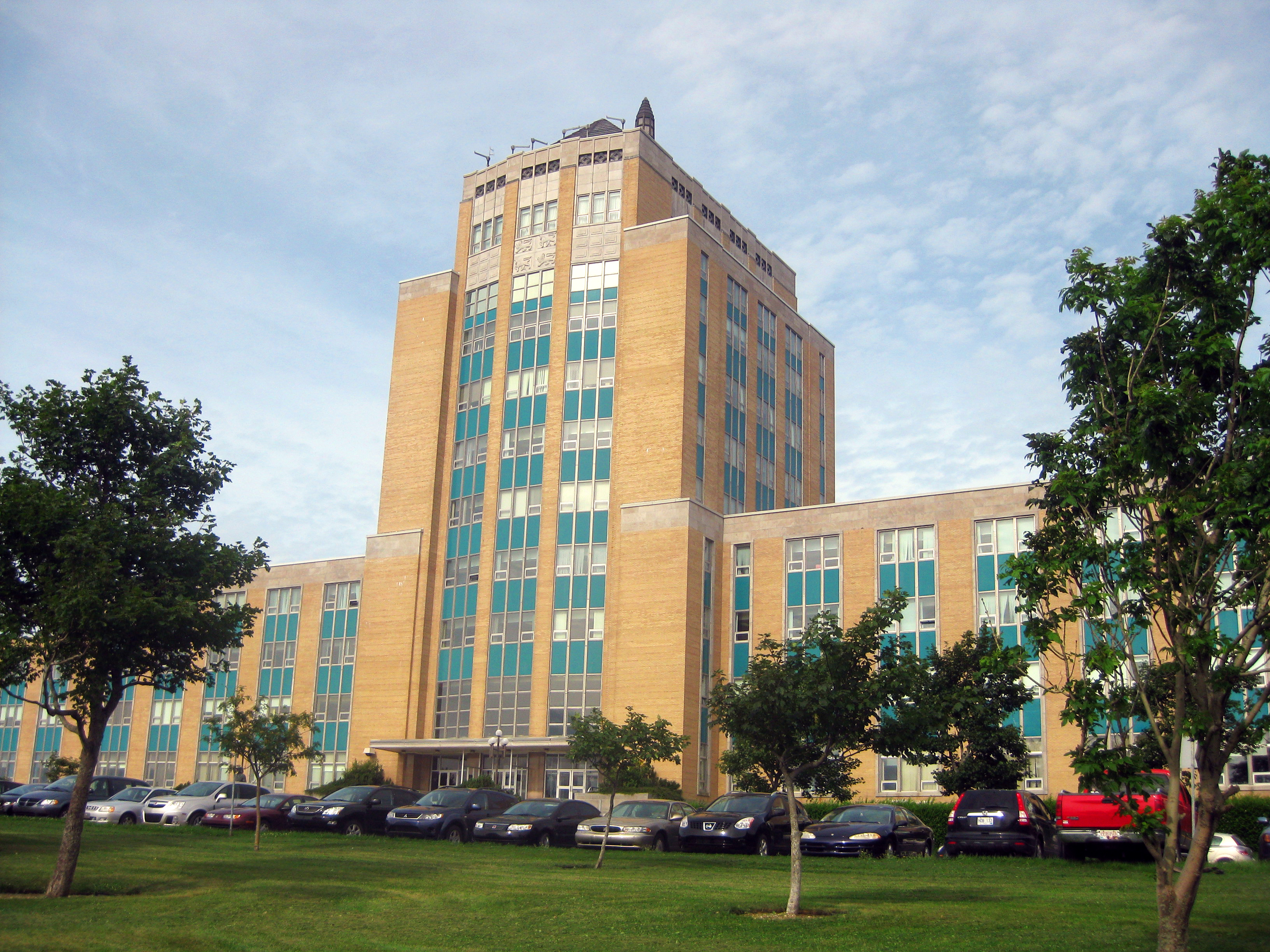
- Confederation Building East Block. Seat of the Newfoundland and Labrador government and the House of Assembly from 1960 to present.

History
- Founded: April 20, 1960
- Disbanded: October 23, 1962
- Preceded by: 31st General Assembly of Newfoundland
- Succeeded by: 33rd General Assembly of Newfoundland

Leadership
- Premier: Joey Smallwood

Elections
- Last election: 1959 Newfoundland general election

The members of the 32nd General Assembly of Newfoundland were elected in the Newfoundland general election held in August 1959. The general assembly sat from April 20, 1960, to October 23, 1962. The assembly moved to the newly constructed Confederation Building in 1960.

The Liberal Party led by Joey Smallwood formed the government.

John R. Courage served as speaker.

There were four sessions of the 32nd General Assembly:

Session	Start	End
1st	April 20, 1960	July 5, 1960
2nd	January 18, 1961	March 13, 1961
3rd	December 4, 1961	January 15, 1962
4th	January 24, 1962	March 20, 1962

Campbell Leonard Macpherson served as lieutenant governor of Newfoundland.

== Members of the Assembly ==
The following members were elected to the assembly in 1959:

Member	Electoral district	Party	First elected / previously elected
Richard J. Greene	Bell Island	Progressive Conservative	1959
Edward S. Spencer	Bonavista North	Liberal	1949
Ross Barbour	Bonavista South	Liberal	1959
John T. Cheeseman	Burgeo and La Poile	Liberal	1956
Eric S. Jones	Burin	Liberal	1956
George W. Clarke	Carbonear-Bay de Verde	Liberal	1956
Myles P. Murray	Ferryland	Liberal	1952
Isaac Mercer	Fogo	Liberal	1951
John R. Courage	Fortune Bay and Hermitage	Liberal	1949
Beaton J. Abbott	Gander	Liberal	1956
Raymond W. Guy	Grand Falls	Liberal	1959
William R. Smallwood	Green Bay	Liberal	1956
Claude A. Sheppard	Harbour Grace	Liberal	1956
Philip J. Lewis	Harbour Main	Liberal	1951
Albert E. Furey	Harbour Main	Progressive Conservative	1959
John A. Forsey	Humber East	Liberal	1956
Charles H. Ballam	Humber West	Liberal	1949
Earl W. Winsor	Labrador North	Liberal	1956
George Sellars	Labrador South	Liberal	1956
Gerald Hill (1962)	Labrador South	Liberal	1962
G. Alain Frecker	Placentia East	Liberal	1959
Patrick J. Canning	Placentia West	Liberal	1949
Stephen K. Smith	Port au Port	Liberal	1956
Llewellyn Strange	Port de Grave	Liberal	1956
James R. Chalker	St. Barbe	Liberal	1949
William J. Keough	St. George's	Liberal	1949
Augustine M. Duffy	St. John's Centre	United Newfoundland	1951, (Note: Ferryland (First elected as Progressive Conservative)) 1956 (Note: Re-elected as Progressive Conservative)
James J. Greene	St. John's East	Progressive Conservative	1959
George M. Nightingale	St. John's North	Liberal	1956
John R. O'Dea	St. John's South	United Newfoundland	1959
Joseph R. Smallwood	St. John's West	Liberal	1949
James M. McGrath	St. Mary's	Liberal	1956
Arthur S. Mifflin	Trinity North	Liberal	1956
Uriah F. Strickland (Note: Elected by acclamation)	Trinity South	Liberal	1956
Leslie R. Curtis	Twillingate	Liberal	1949
C. Maxwell Lane	White Bay North	Liberal	1956
Frederick W. Rowe	White Bay South	Liberal	1952

== By-elections ==
By-elections were held to replace members for various reasons:

Electoral district	Member elected	Affiliation	Election date	Reason
Labrador South	Gerald Hill	Liberal	March 19, 1962	G Sellars died in 1961
