= 30th General Assembly of Newfoundland =

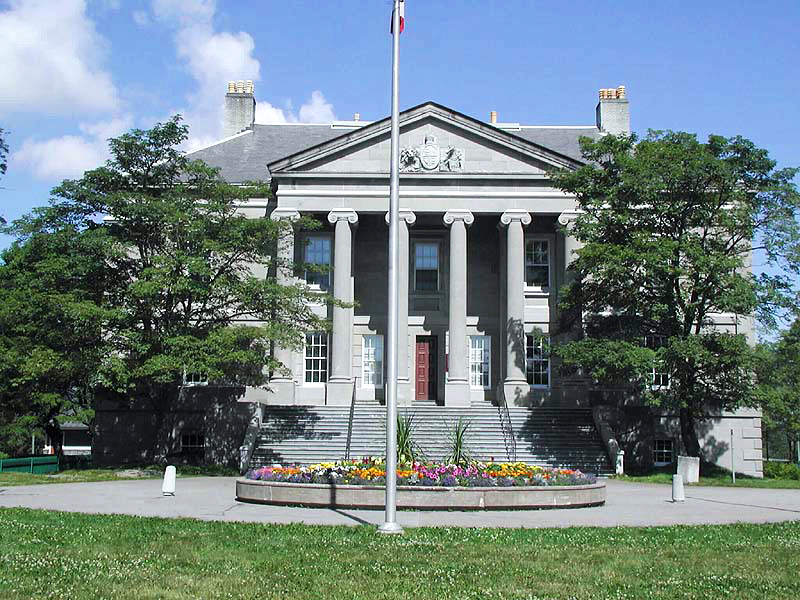
- Colonial Building seat of the Newfoundland government and the House of Assembly from January 28, 1850, to July 28, 1959.

History
- Founded: March 11, 1952
- Disbanded: September 10, 1956
- Preceded by: 29th General Assembly of Newfoundland
- Succeeded by: 31st General Assembly of Newfoundland

Leadership
- Premier: Joey Smallwood

Elections
- Last election: 1951 Newfoundland general election

The members of the 30th General Assembly of Newfoundland were elected in the Newfoundland general election held in November 1951. The general assembly sat from March 11, 1952 to September 10, 1956.

The Liberal Party led by Joey Smallwood formed the government.

Reginald F. Sparkes served as speaker.

There were seven sessions of the 30th General Assembly:

Session	Start	End
1st	March 11, 1952	May 20, 1952
2nd	June 30, 1952	March 11, 1953
3rd	March 11, 1953	May 20, 1953
4th	March 24, 1954	June 21, 1954
5th	March 23, 1955	April 27, 1955
6th	September 12, 1955	September 28, 1955
7th	March 14, 1956	May 10, 1956

Sir Leonard Outerbridge served as lieutenant governor of Newfoundland.

== Members of the Assembly ==
The following members were elected to the assembly in 1951:

Member	Electoral district	Party	First elected
Joseph R. Smallwood	Bonavista North	Liberal	1949
Clyde Brown (Note: Elected by acclamation)	Bonavista South	Liberal	1951
George Norman	Burgeo and La Poile	Liberal	1951
Phillip S. Forsey	Burin	Liberal	1949
Herbert L. Pottle	Carbonear-Bay de Verde	Liberal	1949
Augustine M. Duffy	Ferryland	Progressive Conservative	1951
Myles Murray (1952)	Ferryland	Liberal	1952
Gordon Janes	Fogo	Liberal	1949
John R. Courage	Fortune Bay and Hermitage	Liberal	1949
Edward S. Spencer	Grand Falls	Liberal	1951
A. Baxter Morgan	Green Bay	Liberal	1949
James R. Chalker	Harbour Grace	Liberal	1949
David I. Jackman	Harbour Main-Bell Island	Progressive Conservative	1949
Philip J. Lewis	Harbour Main-Bell Island	Liberal	1951
Charles H. Ballam	Humber	Liberal	1949
Frederick W. Rowe	Labrador (Note: Election held August 2, 1952)	Liberal	1952
Gregory J. Power	Placentia and St. Mary's	Liberal	1951
Patrick J. Canning	Placentia West	Liberal	1949
Isaac Mercer	Port de Grave	Liberal	1951
Reginald F. Sparkes	St. Barbe	Liberal	1949
William J. Keough	St. George's-Port au Port	Liberal	1949
James D. Higgins	St. John's East	Progressive Conservative	1949
Frank D. Fogwill	St. John's East	Progressive Conservative	1949
Peter J. Cashin	St. John's West	Progressive Conservative	1951
Oliver L. Vardy	St. John's West	Liberal	1949
Malcolm Hollett (1952)	St. John's West	Progressive Conservative	1952
William J. Browne (1954)	St. John's West	Progressive Conservative	1954
Samuel J. Hefferton	Trinity North	Liberal	1949
C. Maxwell Button	Trinity South	Liberal	1949
Leslie R. Curtis	Twillingate	Liberal	1949
Samuel Drover	White Bay	Liberal	1949
Samuel Drover	White Bay	CCF	1949

== By-elections ==
By-elections were held to replace members for various reasons:

Electoral district	Member elected	Affiliation	Election date	Reason
St. John's West	Malcolm Hollett	Progressive Conservative	February 7, 1952	O L Vardy named Deputy Minister of Economic Development
Ferryland	Myles Murray	Liberal	September 25, 1952	Voting irregularities discovered during recount
St. John's West	William J. Browne	Progressive Conservative	March 9, 1954	P J Cashin resigned to run for federal seat
