= 1951 Newfoundland general election =

Canadian provincial election

- November 26, 1951

28 seats of the Newfoundland House of Assembly 15 seats were needed for a majority
- Turnout: 75.1% (▼20.4 pp)
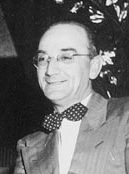

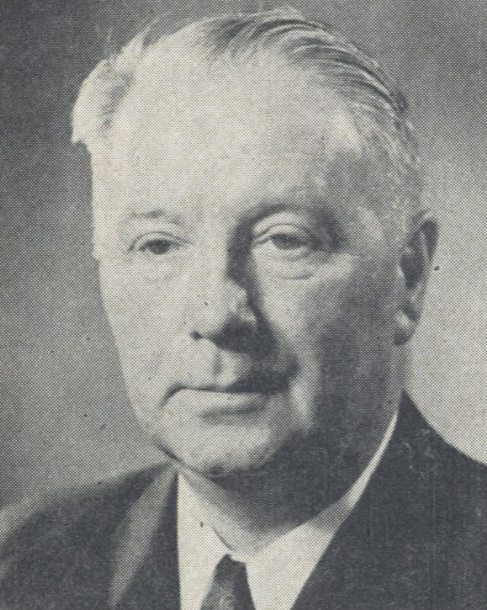
	First party	Second party
Leader	Joey Smallwood	Peter Cashin
Party	Liberal	Progressive Conservative
Leader since	1949	1951
Leader's seat	Bonavista North	St. John's West (Note: Not the incumbent, but ran in this district and won)
Last election	22	5
Seats won	24	4
Seat change	▲2	▼1
Popular vote	83,628	46,782
Percentage	63.6%	35.6%
Swing	▼2.1pp	▲3.1pp
Premier before election
Joey Smallwood
Liberal
Premier after election
Joey Smallwood
Liberal

The 1951 Newfoundland general election was held on 26 November 1951 to elect members of the 30th General Assembly of Newfoundland. It was won by the Liberal party.

== Results ==
Party	Leader	1949	Seats won	% change	Popular vote	(%)
Liberal	Joey Smallwood	22	24		83,628	63.6%
Progressive Conservative	Peter Cashin	5	4		46,782	35.6%
Other		1	0	-100%	1,156	0.88%
Totals		28	28	-	131,566	100%

== Results by district ==
- Names in **boldface type** represent party leaders.
- † indicates that the incumbent did not run again.
- ‡ indicates that the incumbent ran in a different district.

=== St. John's ===
Electoral district	Candidates		Incumbent
Electoral district	Liberal	PC	Incumbent
St. John's East	William Ashley; 4,652; 20.11%	James Higgins; 7,208; 31.17%	John Higgins†
St. John's East	William Ryan; 4,634; 20.04%	Frank Fogwill; 6,634; 28.68%	Frank Fogwill
St. John's West	Oliver Vardy; 7,068; 25.56%	**Peter Cashin**; 7,176; 25.95%	Oliver Vardy
St. John's West	James Spratt; 6,598; 23.86%	Malcolm Hollett; 6,811; 24.63%	James Spratt

=== Conception Bay ===
Electoral district	Candidates			Incumbent
Electoral district	Liberal	PC	Other	Incumbent
Carbonear-Bay de Verde	Herbert Pottle; 3,138; 72.27%	P.W. Crummey; 1,204; 27.73%		Herbert Pottle
Harbour Grace	James Chalker; 2,079; 71.76%	Richard Parsons; 818; 28.24%		James Chalker
Harbour Main-Bell Island	Philip Lewis; 2,893; 25.25%	David Jackman; 2,939; 25.65%		David Jackman
Harbour Main-Bell Island	Addison Bown; 2,877; 25.11%	John Dawson; 2,747; 23.98%		Ronald Fahey†
Port de Grave	Isaac Mercer; 1,935; 66.06%	Richard A. Parsons; 937; 31.99%	Edgar Russell (Independent); 57; 1.95%	George Makinson†

=== Avalon and Burin Peninsulas ===
Electoral district	Candidates			Incumbent
Electoral district	Liberal	PC	Other	Incumbent
Burin	Phillip Forsey; 3,611; 90.61%	Grace Sparkes; 374; 9.39%		Phillip Forsey
Ferryland (Note: A judicial recount was held in this riding. Due to voting irregularities, a by-election was held on September 25, 1952, where Murray was ultimately elected.)	Myles Murray; 1,426; 49.96%	Augustine Duffy; 1,428; 50.04%		**Peter Cashin**‡ (ran in St. John's West)
Placentia-St. Mary's	Greg Power; 2,587; 66.61%	Cornelius Mahoney; 1,297; 33.39%		Leonard Miller†
Placentia West	Patrick Canning; 2,779; 74.05%	Edward Reddy; 605; 16.12%	James McCarthy (Independent); 369; 9.83%	Patrick Canning
Trinity South	Maxwell Button; 2,630; 74.46%	Edward Cranford; 494; 13.99%	James Reid (Independent); 408; 11.55%	Maxwell Button

=== Eastern and Central Newfoundland ===
Electoral district	Candidates		Incumbent
Electoral district	Liberal	PC	Incumbent
Bonavista North	**Joey Smallwood**; 3,916; 91.71%	Kitchener Pritchett; 354; 8.29%	**Joey Smallwood**
Bonavista South	Clyde Brown; Won by acclamation		Ted Russell†
Fogo	Gordon Janes; 2,529; 87.09%	James Way; 375; 12.91%	Gordon Janes
Grand Falls	Edward Spencer; 5,935; 78.04%	Nobel Baird; 1,670; 21.96%	Edward Spencer
Green Bay	Baxter Morgan; Won by acclamation		Baxter Morgan
Trinity North	Samuel Hefferton; 3,159; 79.55%	Martin Bourne; 812; 20.45%	Samuel Hefferton
Twillingate	Leslie Curtis; Won by acclamation		Leslie Curtis

=== Southern and Western Newfoundland ===
Electoral district	Candidates		Incumbent
Electoral district	Liberal	PC	Incumbent
Burgeo-La Poile	George Norman; 2,615; 82.00%	E.J. Skinner; 574; 18.00%	Herman Quinton†
Fortune and Hermitage	John Courage; 4,364; 96.27%	Stanley Keeping; 169; 3.73%	John Courage
Humber	Charles Ballam; 6,458; 88.48%	Wesley Parsons; 841; 11.52%	Charles Ballam
St. Barbe	Reginald Sparkes; 2,421; 90.74%	Roland Roberts; 247; 9.26%	Reginald Sparkes
St. George's-Port au Port	William Keough; 3,144; 70.48%	D.J. Gillis; 1,317; 29.52%	William Keough
White Bay	Sam Drover; Won by acclamation		Sam Drover

=== Labrador ===
Electoral district	Candidates	Incumbent
Electoral district	Liberal	Incumbent
Labrador	Frederick W. Rowe; Won by acclamation	Harold Horwood†
