= Charles Devine =

Canadian politician (1928–2008)

Charles Devine MHA

Member of the Newfoundland House of Assembly for Labrador West
- In office November 16, 1962 – September 8, 1966
- Preceded by: Earl Winsor (as MHA for Labrador North)
- Succeeded by: Tom Burgess

Personal details
- Born: May 7, 1928 St. John's, Newfoundland
- Died: October 1, 2008 (aged 80) St. John's, Newfoundland and Labrador, Canada
- Party: Newfoundland Democratic (1959–1962); Independent (1962–1966); Progressive Conservative (1966)
- Occupation: Statistician and newspaper owner

Charles Stanislaus "Charlie" Devine (May 7, 1928 – Oct. 1, 2008) was a Newfoundlander and Canadian politician. He represented Labrador West in the Newfoundland House of Assembly from 1962 to 1966.

== Early life and career ==
The son of Louis A. Devine and Alice Hearn, he was born in St. John's. He worked in the family business and then worked as a civilian executive in the United States Air Force. He later moved to Labrador, where he worked as a statistician for the Iron Ore Company of Canada. Devine founded the Labrador City newspaper The Aurora. He also served as president of the local Chamber of Commerce and Rotary Club.

== Politics and later life ==
Devine first unsuccessfully ran for election to the House of Assembly in 1959 as a candidate for the newly created Newfoundland Democratic Party in the district of St. John's South. He was then successfully elected to the new district of Labrador West in the subsequent 1962 general election as an independent candidate. While in the House of Assembly, Devine crossed the floor and joined the provincial Progressive Conservative (PC) party.

Devine alleged that the government of Joey Smallwood ignored the concerns of Labrador and its residents. In 1966, he controversially suggested that a plebiscite should be held in Labrador on whether the region should join the province of Quebec. He issued a nine point list with requirements for starting discussions with the Quebecois government, which included the construction of a highway between Labrador City and Gagnon, an exemption from provincial and income taxes, and the construction of a nationalized Churchill Falls power plant. Smallwood briefly responded that Devine "should be promptly locked up." Devine would go on to lose his seat in the 1966 general election.

Following his exit from the House of Assembly, Devine retired to St. John's, where he helped establish the Canadian Association of Retired Persons. He died at St. Clare's Hospital in St. John's.

== Electoral history ==
1966 Newfoundland general election: Labrador West
Party	Candidate	Votes	%	±%
Liberal	Tom Burgess	1,493	61.82	▲20.74
Progressive Conservative	Charles Devine	574	23.77	▼35.15
New Democratic	Albert McGrath	348	14.41	–
Total valid votes		2,445	99.67	
Total rejected ballots		8	0.33	▼0.82
Total votes		2,453	64.10	
Eligible voters		3,827		
Liberal gain from Progressive Conservative		Swing		▲27.95

1962 Newfoundland general election: Labrador West
Party	Candidate	Votes	%	±%
Independent	Charles Devine	558	58.92	–
Liberal	Edward Henley	389	41.08	–
Total valid votes		947	98.85	
Total rejected ballots		11	1.15	
Total votes		958	86.38	
Eligible voters		1,109		
Liberal gain		Swing		–

1959 Newfoundland general election: St. John's South
Party	Candidate	Votes	%	±%
United Newfoundland	John R. O'Dea	2,997	49.37	–
Progressive Conservative	Rex Renouf	2,859	47.09	▼8.98
Newfoundland Democratic	Charles Devine	215	3.54	–
Total valid votes		6,071	99.26	
Total rejected ballots		45	0.74	
Total votes		6,116	86.38	
Eligible voters		8,871		
United Newfoundland gain from Progressive Conservative		Swing		–
