= Isaac Mercer (disambiguation) =

Isaac Mercer may refer to:

- Isaac Mercer (1910–2002), Newfoundland lawyer and politician
- Isaac Mercer (Bay de Verde), who represented Bay de Verde in the Newfoundland assembly from 1902 to 1904 in 1900 Newfoundland general election
- Isaac Mercer (died 1860), whose murder led to a ban on the practice of mummering in Newfoundland
