= Trevor Bennett (disambiguation) =

Trevor Bennett (1926–2026) was a Canadian politician in Newfoundland and Labrador

Trevor Bennett may also refer to:

- A fictional character in The Adventure of the Creeping Man, a 1923 Sherlock Holmes story by Sir Arthur Conan Doyle
- A trophy awarded by the Quebec Junior Football League
