= Cartwright-L'Anse au Clair =

Provincial electoral district in Newfoundland and Labrador, Canada

Coordinates: 51°25′55″N 57°03′50″W

Newfoundland and Labrador electoral district
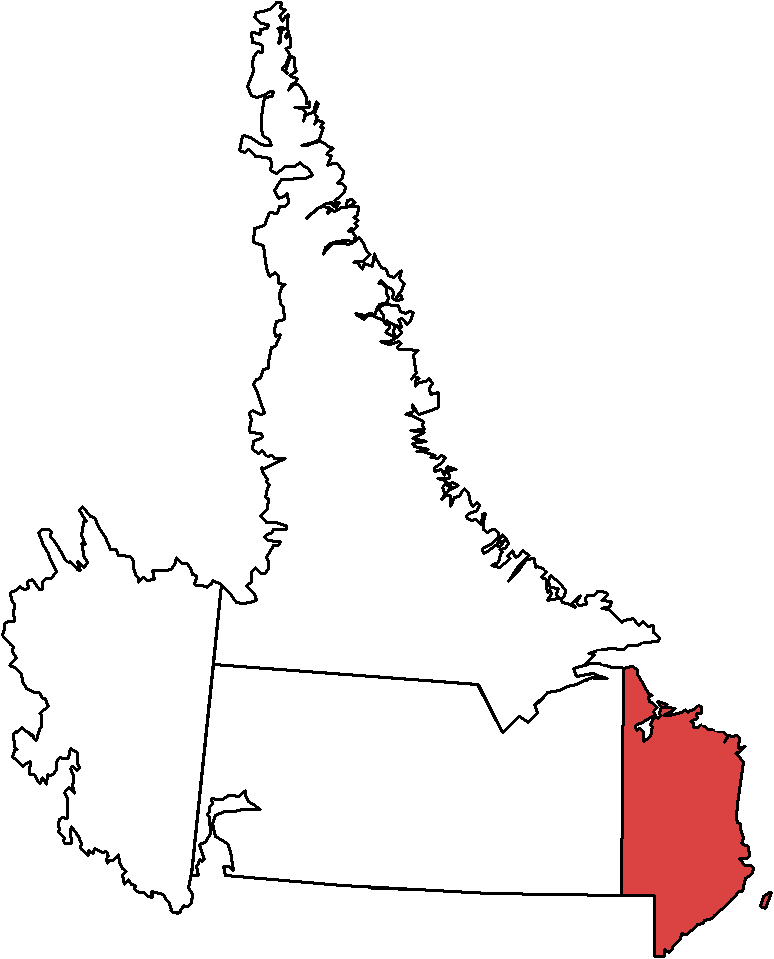
- Cartwright-L'Anse au Clair in relation to other districts in Labrador

Provincial electoral district
- Legislature: Newfoundland and Labrador House of Assembly
MHA
Lisa Dempster
Liberal
- District created: 1975
- First contested: 1975
- Last contested: 2025

Demographics
- Population (2006): 4,713
- Electors (2011): 3,131
- Census division: Division No. 10
- Census subdivision(s): Cartwright, Charlottetown, Division No. 10, Subdivision A, Division No. 10, Subdivision B, Forteau, L'Anse-au-Clair, L'Anse-au-Loup, Mary's Harbour, Pinware, Port Hope Simpson, Red Bay, St. Lewis, West St. Modeste

Cartwright-L'Anse au Clair is a provincial electoral district for the House of Assembly of Newfoundland and Labrador, Canada. In 2011, there were 3,131 eligible voters living within the district.

The district covers remote communities in Southern Labrador that are mostly dependent on fishery. The district includes: Black Tickle, Charlottetown, Capstan Island, Cartwright, Domino, Forteau, L'Anse Amour, L'Anse au Clair, L'Anse au Loup, Lodge Bay, Mary's Harbour, Norman Bay, Paradise River, Pinsent's Arm, Pinware, Port Hope Simpson, Red Bay, St. Lewis, and West St. Modeste.

The district is considered one of the safest Liberal seats in the province; on only one occasion in almost 50 years have voters not elected a Liberal, and even then — in 1996 — it was with a Liberal running as an Independent; Yvonne Jones was a mainstay of the Liberal caucus after that, and served as Liberal party leader from 2007 to 2011. She resigned to take up a seat in the federal House of Commons in 2013. Lisa Dempster was elected as her successor, and has represented the seat since then.

== Members of the House of Assembly ==
Assembly	Years	Member	Party
Labrador South
31st	1956–1959	George Sellars	Liberal
32nd	1959–1962	George Sellars	Liberal
33rd	1963–1966	Gerald I. Hill	Liberal
34th	1966–1971	Gerald I. Hill	Liberal
35th	1971–1972	Joe Harvey	Liberal
36th	1972-1972	Joe Harvey	Liberal
36th	1972–1975	Michael S. Martin	Labrador Party
Eagle River
37th	1975–1979	Ian Strachan	Liberal
38th	1979–1982	Eugene Hiscock	Liberal
39th	1982–1985	Eugene Hiscock	Liberal
40th	1985–1989	Eugene Hiscock	Liberal
41st	1989–1993	Danny Dumaresque	Liberal
42nd	1993–1996	Danny Dumaresque	Liberal
Cartwright - L'Anse au Clair
43rd	1996–1999	Yvonne Jones	Independent
44th	1999–2003	Yvonne Jones	Liberal
45th	2003–2007	Yvonne Jones	Liberal
46th	2007–2011	Yvonne Jones	Liberal
47th	2011–2013	Yvonne Jones	Liberal
47th	2013–2015	Lisa Dempster	Liberal
48th	2015–2019	Lisa Dempster	Liberal
49th	2019–2021	Lisa Dempster	Liberal
50th	2021–2025	Lisa Dempster	Liberal
51st	2025–Present	Lisa Dempster	Liberal

== Election results ==
Graph of election results (minor parties that never got 2% of the vote or did not run consistently are omitted) View source data.

=== Cartwright-L'Anse au Clair ===
2025 Newfoundland and Labrador general election
Party	Candidate	Votes	%	±%
Liberal	Lisa Dempster	789	53.75	-41.46
Progressive Conservative	Nina Rumbolt-Pye	641	43.66	+38.87
New Democratic	Patricia Bailey	38	2.59	
Total valid votes		1,468		
Total rejected ballots				
Turnout				
Eligible voters				
Liberal hold		Swing		-40.16

2021 Newfoundland and Labrador general election
Party	Candidate	Votes	%	±%
Liberal	Lisa Dempster	973	95.21	+27.98
Progressive Conservative	Joshua Nolan	49	4.79	-27.98
Total valid votes		1,022	99.42	
Total rejected ballots		6	0.58	
Turnout		1,028	35.28	
Eligible voters		2,914		
Liberal hold		Swing		+27.98
Source(s) "Officially Nominated Candidates General Election 2021" (PDF). Elections Newfoundland and Labrador. "NL Election 2021 (Unofficial Results)".

2019 Newfoundland and Labrador general election
Party	Candidate	Votes	%	±%
Liberal	Lisa Dempster	1,132	67.22	-25.8
Progressive Conservative	Michael Normore	552	32.78	+29.6
Total valid votes		1,684	100	
Total rejected ballots		24		
Turnout		1,708	58.8	
Eligible voters		2,905		
Liberal hold		Swing		-27.71

2015 Newfoundland and Labrador general election
Party	Candidate	Votes	%	±%
Liberal	Lisa Dempster	1,405	93.05	+39.48
New Democratic	Jennifer Deon	57	3.77	-29.20
Progressive Conservative	Jason MacKenzie	48	3.18	-10.29
Total valid votes		1,510	99.60	
Total rejected ballots		6	0.40	
Turnout		1,516	49.48	
Eligible voters		3,064		
Liberal hold		Swing		+34.34

By-election, June 25, 2013 Resignation of Yvonne Jones
Party	Candidate	Votes	%	+/-
Liberal	Lisa Dempster	1,142	53.56	-24.24
NDP	Jason Spingle	703	32.97	+30.91
Progressive Conservative	Dennis Normore	287	13.46	-13.33
Liberal hold		Swing		-24.24

2011 Newfoundland and Labrador general election
Party	Candidate	Votes	%	±%
Liberal	Yvonne Jones	1,516	71.14	-1.74
Progressive Conservative	Glen Acreman	571	26.79	-0.33
NDP	Bill Cooper	44	2.06	
Total valid votes		2,131	100.0	
Difference		945	44.35	
Total rejected ballots		2	0.09	
Turnout		2,133	67.87	
Liberal hold		Swing		-1.58

2007 Newfoundland and Labrador general election
Party	Candidate	Votes	%	±%
Liberal	Yvonne Jones	1,736	72.88	+12.90
Progressive Conservative	Dennis Normore	646	27.12	-4.73

2003 Newfoundland and Labrador general election
Party	Candidate	Votes	%	±%
Liberal	Yvonne Jones	1,514	59.98	-25.47
Progressive Conservative	Dennis Normore	804	31.85	+17.30
Labrador Party	Frank Pye	206	8.16	+8.16

1999 Newfoundland and Labrador general election
Party	Candidate	Votes	%	±%
Liberal	Yvonne Jones	1,832	85.45	+43.37
Progressive Conservative	Sharon Moores	312	14.55	+13.12

1996 Newfoundland and Labrador general election
Party	Candidate	Votes	%	±%
Independent	Yvonne Jones	1,665	56.83	
Liberal	Danny Dumaresque	1,233	42.08	
Progressive Conservative	Berkley Bursey	42	1.43	–

=== Eagle River ===
1993 Newfoundland and Labrador general election
Party	Candidate	Votes	%	±%
Liberal	Danny Dumaresque	1,578	66.95	+6.93
Progressive Conservative	Michael Kelly	486	20.62	–19.36
NDP	Jessie Bird	293	12.43	–

1989 Newfoundland and Labrador general election
Party	Candidate	Votes	%	±%
Liberal	Danny Dumaresque	1,540	60.02	+14.67
Progressive Conservative	Reginald Hancock	1,026	39.98	+9.00

1985 Newfoundland and Labrador general election
Party	Candidate	Votes	%	±%
Liberal	Eugene Hiscock	1,170	46.35	–8.23
Progressive Conservative	Stanley Pike	782	30.98	+9.12
NDP	Claude Rumbolt	573	22.70	–0.86

1982 Newfoundland and Labrador general election
Party	Candidate	Votes	%	±%
Liberal	Eugene Hiscock	1,316	54.58	+3.58
NDP	Claude Rumbolt	568	23.56	+19.02
Progressive Conservative	Philip Stone	527	21.86	–22.60

1979 Newfoundland and Labrador general election
Party	Candidate	Votes	%	±%
Liberal	Eugene Hiscock	865	51.00	–11.18
Progressive Conservative	Claude Rumbolt	754	44.46	+6.64
NDP	Elsie McDonald	77	4.54	–

1975 Newfoundland general election
Party	Candidate	Votes	%	±%
Liberal	Ian Strachan	962	62.18	
Progressive Conservative	Churchill White	585	37.82	–

=== Labrador South ===
Labrador South by-election, August 31, 1972 Void Election
Party	Candidate	Votes	%	±%
Labrador Party	Michael Martin	1.047	50.65	+0.68
Liberal	Josiah Harvey	899	43.05	–6.98
Progressive Conservative	Edward Kersey	132	6.30	–

1972 Newfoundland general election
Party	Candidate	Votes	%	±%
Liberal	Josiah Harvey	933	50.03	+2.51
Labrador Party	Michael Martin	932	49.97	+6.88

1971 Newfoundland general election
Party	Candidate	Votes	%	±%
Liberal	Josiah Harvey	890	47.52	–42.86
Labrador Party	Michael Martin	807	43.09	–
Progressive Conservative	Edward Kean	176	9.40	–

1966 Newfoundland general election
Party	Candidate	Votes	%	±%
Liberal	Gerald I. Hill	1,129	90.39	
Progressive Conservative	Leace Critch	120	9.61	–

1962 Newfoundland general election
Party	Candidate	Votes	%	±%
Liberal	Gerald I. Hill	acc.		

Labrador South by-election, March 19, 1962 Death of George Sellars
Party	Candidate	Votes	%	±%
Liberal	Gerald I. Hill	acc.		

1959 Newfoundland general election
Party	Candidate	Votes	%	±%
Liberal	George Sellars	1,061	90.84	
Progressive Conservative	Roderick Roberts	107	9.16	–

1956 Newfoundland general election
Party	Candidate	Votes	%	±%
Liberal	George Sellars	acc.		

== See also ==
- List of Newfoundland and Labrador provincial electoral districts
- Canadian provincial electoral districts
