= Gerald Myrden =

Canadian politician

MHA for St. Barbe South
- In office 1966–1971
- Preceded by: William Joseph Smith
- Succeeded by: Edward Maynard

Personal details
- Born: July 1, 1922 North Sydney, Nova Scotia
- Died: April 4, 2016 (aged 93)
- Party: Liberal Party of Newfoundland and Labrador
- Occupation: Businessman

Gerald H. N. Myrden (July 1, 1922 – April 4, 2016) was a businessperson and politician in Newfoundland. He represented St. Barbe South in the Newfoundland House of Assembly from 1966 to 1971. The son of Alexander and Lillian Myrden, he was born in North Sydney, Nova Scotia and was educated in Corner Brook. He was president of G.H. Myrden Ltd, Tayden Co. Ltd, West Coast Supply Store Ltd and Western Beverages Ltd. Myrden was elected to the Newfoundland assembly in 1966.
