= William Smith (Newfoundland politician) =

Canadian lawyer and politician

William Joseph Smith

MHA for St. Barbe South
- In office 1962–1965
- Succeeded by: Gerald Myrden

Personal details
- Born: 1910 Brigus, Newfoundland
- Died: August 4, 1965 (aged 55) Corner Brook, Newfoundland
- Party: Progressive Conservative Party of Newfoundland and Labrador
- Spouse: Mary Kelloway Smith
- Occupation: Lawyer

William (Bill) Joseph Smith (1910 – August 4, 1965) was a Canadian lawyer, politician, and member of the Newfoundland Ranger Force.

== Life and career ==
As a young man, Smith worked for his family's business before becoming Newfoundland Ranger #56, where he served for over 11 years. From July 1937 to September 1948, he attended Dalhouise Law School in Halifax, Nova Scotia, where he earned the Smith Shield for his performance in moot court.

After graduating, Smith articled with R.A. Parsons in St. John's, then joined the legal practice of L. Whelan in Corner Brook. He practiced as a partner at Barry and Smith from 1954–1964.

With his wife, Mary Kelloway Smith (1917-1997), Bill had one boy and four girls. The eldest, Patricia, died shortly after birth. The second child, Robert T. Smith (1946-2022), was a teacher, turned provincial court judge in Newfoundland and Labrador and also a prolific wedding officiant, conducting well over 2,000 ceremonies during the course of his career. His grandson, Michael A. Smith (1996), is a Canadian journalist and formerly the assistant editor of Canvet Publications Inc., which produces two of Canada’s premier military and history magazines: Legion Magazine and Canada’s Ultimate Story.

Smith served in the Newfoundland House of Assembly representing St. Barbe from 1962 until his death from heart failure in 1965, at the age of 55.
