= Allan Evans (politician) =

Canadian politician

Allan Evans (February 19, 1917 – 1992?) was a salesman and politician in Newfoundland. He represented Burgeo & La Poile in the Newfoundland House of Assembly from 1971 to 1975.

The son of Frederick Theodore Evans and Elvira Savoury, he was born in St. Jacques and was educated there, at Bishop Feild College and at Memorial University. In 1938, Evans married Winifred Hayman.

He ran unsuccessfully for a seat in the Newfoundland assembly in 1956, 1959, 1962 and 1966 before being elected in 1971; he was reelected in 1972.
