= Trevor Bennett =

Canadian politician (1926–2026)

MHA for St. Barbe
- In office 1982–1985
- Preceded by: Edward Maynard
- Succeeded by: Everett Osmond

Personal details
- Born: September 3, 1926 Daniel's Harbour, Newfoundland
- Died: May 5, 2026 (aged 99) Corner Brook, Newfoundland, Canada
- Party: Liberal Party of Newfoundland and Labrador
- Spouse: Mildred Jane Field (m. 1952)
- Children: 4, including Jim
- Occupation: Businessman

Angus Trevor Bennett (September 3, 1926 – May 5, 2026) was a Canadian politician in Newfoundland and Labrador. He served in the Newfoundland and Labrador House of Assembly for St. Barbe from 1979 to 1982 as a member of the Liberal Party of Newfoundland and Labrador. He was the son of Angus and Myra Bennett, from Daniel's Harbour, Newfoundland and Labrador. His mother was a notable nurse, dubbed "The Florence Nightingale of Newfoundland". Their home in Daniel's Harbor, Bennett House, is a Registered Heritage Structure in the province. Bennett was educated in Daniel's Harbour and was a businessman. He married Mildred Jane Field in 1952 and had four children. Bennett died in Corner Brook on May 5, 2026, at the age of 99.
