= Pinware =

Pinware Pied Noir
- Town
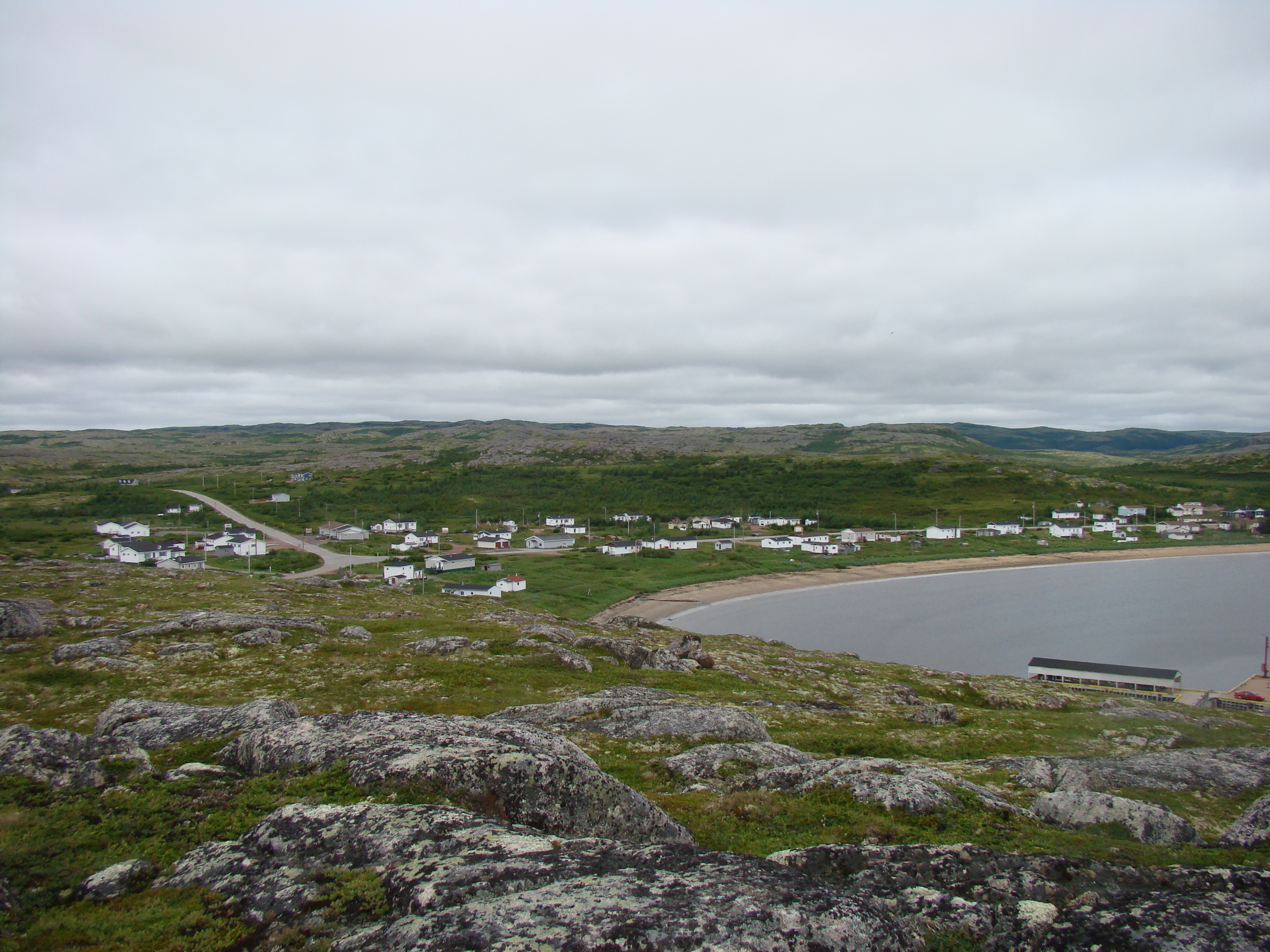
- Pinware, NL

- Location within Newfoundland and Labrador
- Coordinates: 51°37′19″N 56°42′50″W
- Country: Canada
- Province: Newfoundland and Labrador
- Incorporated: 1978

Government
  - Type: Municipal Council
  - Mayor: Kayla Beals
  - Town Clerk: Mary Ellen Butt

Population (2021)
  - Total: 64
- Time zone: UTC-03:30 (NST)
  - Summer (DST): UTC-02:30 (NDT)
- Area code: 709
- Highways: Route 510 (Trans-Labrador Highway)

Pinware is a town in the Canadian province of Newfoundland and Labrador. The town has a population of 64, according to the Canada 2021 Census.

The town is located along Route 510 in Labrador, between L'Anse-au-Diable and Red Bay.

The community has been formerly known as Riviere des François, Pirouette River, and Black Bay. It is believed the name is a corruption of Pied Noir (black foot) from the shape of a rock found at the mouth of Black Rock Brook.

== Demographics ==
In the 2021 Census of Population conducted by Statistics Canada, Pinware had a population of 64 living in 28 of its 31 total private dwellings, a change of −27.3% from its 2016 population of 88. With a land area of 4.08 km^{2} (1.58 sq mi), it had a population density of 15.7/km^{2} (40.6/sq mi) in 2021.

Its 2016 census count of 88 was a decrease from its 2011 population of 107.

== Economy ==
Pinware was once a fishing community.

== See also ==
- List of cities and towns in Newfoundland and Labrador
