= Fabian O'Dea =

Canadian lawyer and lieutenant governor

The Honourable Fabian Aloysius O'Dea QC

4th Lieutenant Governor of Newfoundland
- In office March 1, 1963 – April 2, 1969
- Monarch: Elizabeth II
- Governors General: George Vanier; Roland Michener
- Premier: Joey Smallwood
- Preceded by: Campbell Macpherson
- Succeeded by: Ewart John Arlington Harnum

Personal details
- Born: January 20, 1918 St. John's, Dominion of Newfoundland
- Died: December 12, 2004 (aged 86) St. John's, Newfoundland and Labrador, Canada
- Spouse: Constance Margaret Ewing (1950

Military service
- Allegiance: Canada
- Branch/service: Royal Canadian Naval Volunteer Reserve
- Years of service: 1939-1945
- Battles/wars: Second World War

Fabian Aloysius O'Dea, QC (January 20, 1918 – December 12, 2004) was a Newfoundland and Canadian lawyer and the fourth lieutenant governor of Newfoundland.

== Family ==
He was the son of John V. O'Dea and May (Coady) O'Dea. In 1950, O'Dea married Constance Margaret (Peggy) Ewing. They had four children; Deborah (1951), Victoria (Viki) (1953), Stephen (1954) and Jane (1956).

== Life and career ==
Born in St. John's, O'Dea was educated at St. Bonaventure's College, Memorial University of Newfoundland (MUN), University of Toronto, Dalhousie University and Christ Church, Oxford.

In 1939, he was selected Rhodes Scholar for Newfoundland, but delayed going to Oxford in order to join the Royal Canadian Naval Volunteer Reserve, where he served as torpedo officer.

In 1945, when he retired from the reserve he attended Oxford for a BCL degree and was admitted to the English Bar at the Inner Temple in 1948.

In 1949, O'Dea was made honorary aide-de-camp to the Governor General of Canada. From 1949 to 1961 he was aide-de-camp to the Lieutenant Governor of Newfoundland and Labrador. In 1963 O'Dea became Lieutenant Governor of Newfoundland and Labrador and a QC.

O'Dea was a member of the Board of Regents for MUN, Vice-President for Newfoundland at the Canadian Bar Association and a member of the Canadian Rhodes Scholarship selection committee. Fabian O'Dea was also a collector of sixteenth to eighteenth century maps of Newfoundland and Labrador.

John R. O'Dea was the brother of Fabian O'Dea. Brian O'Dea was Fabian O'Dea's nephew.

== Awards and honours ==
O'Dea's awards include:

- 1963 Knight of Grace of St. John of Jerusalem
- 1969 LL.D by Memorial University of Newfoundland
- 1988 Knight of Malta
- 1990 Knight of Justice of St. John of Jerusalem

Coat of arms of Fabian O'Dea

Notes
Recorded at the College of Arms on 1 June 1967.
Crest
A caribou statant erect Proper holding in its mouth a trefoil Vert and supporting between the forelegs a fasces palewise Or.
Escutcheon
Vert on a fess wavy Argent between in chief a fouled anchor surmounted by a balance and in base a sun rising Or two barrulets wavy Vert.
Motto
Constans (Steadfast)
