= Gerald Hill (politician) =

Canadian businessman and politician

Gerald Irvine Hill (February 1, 1919 – February 22, 1997) was an insurance company executive and politician in Newfoundland. He represented Labrador South from 1962 to 1971 in the Newfoundland House of Assembly.

The son of Captain Sidney and Sophie Hill, he was born in Wesleyville and was educated at Prince of Wales College and Acadia University. He joined Confederation Life in 1942; in 1961, he became manager for the Newfoundland division. He was elected to the Newfoundland assembly by acclamation in a 1962 by-election held following the death of George Sellars. He was reelected in 1962 and 1966 and served in the Newfoundland cabinet as a minister without portfolio from 1968 to 1971. After he retired from Confederation Life in 1975, Hill continued to work as a self-employed insurance and business consultant.

He died in 1997.
