= George Sellars (Newfoundland politician) =

Canadian politician (1890–1961)

Member of the Newfoundland House of Assembly for Labrador South
- In office October 2, 1956 – October 24, 1961
- Preceded by: Frederick W. Rowe (as MHA for Labrador)
- Succeeded by: Gerald Hill

Personal details
- Born: December 28, 1890 Bonavista, Newfoundland Colony
- Died: October 24, 1961 (aged 70) St. John's, Newfoundland, Canada
- Party: Liberal
- Spouse: Elizabeth Taylor (m. 1916)
- Children: 3

George Sellars (December 28, 1890 – October 24, 1961) was a Canadian politician who was elected to the Newfoundland and Labrador House of Assembly in the 1956 provincial election. He represented the electoral district of Labrador South as a member of the Liberal Party of Newfoundland and Labrador until his death in office in 1961.

Sellars was born in Bonavista, Newfoundland in 1890. He resided in his hometown and worked as a wireless operator and as a co-operative and commercial business manager for a decade. Sellers also worked for the Canadian National Railway for 40 years and was a justice of the peace. He married Elizabeth Taylor in 1916 and had three children. Sellars died of a heart attack while still in office, on October 24, 1961.
