= Reginald F. Sparkes =

Canadian politician (1906–1990)

- Sparkes in 1961

27th Speaker of the Newfoundland House of Assembly
- In office 1949–1956
- Preceded by: James A. Winter (pre-Confederation)
- Succeeded by: John R. Courage

Member of the Newfoundland House of Assembly for St. Barbe
- In office May 27, 1949 – October 2, 1956
- Preceded by: George C. Whiteley (pre-Confederation)
- Succeeded by: James Chalker

Personal details
- Born: June 27, 1906 Jackson's Arm, Newfoundland Colony
- Died: January 1990 (aged 83)
- Party: Liberal
- Spouse: Ann "Hannah" Bugden (m. 1930)
- Education: Bishop Feild College; Columbia University
- Occupation: Teacher, writer

Reginald Ford Sparkes (June 27, 1906 – January 1990) was an educator, writer and political figure in Newfoundland. He represented St. Barbe in the Newfoundland and Labrador House of Assembly from 1949 to 1956. Sparkes was the first speaker for the House of Assembly after Newfoundland became part of Canada.

== Biography ==
He was born in Jackson's Arm, Newfoundland, the son of Isaac Sparkes and Roseanna Ford, and was educated there, at Bishop Feild College and Columbia University. He taught in Trinity Bay and Change Islands. In 1936, he became a supervisor inspector for west coast schools in Newfoundland. Sparkes married Hannah Bugden. He retired from politics in 1956 and became manager of the Newfoundland Savings Bank, later taken over by the Bank of Montreal. In 1967, he retired to Hallstown, North River. He died in 1990.

== Publications ==
- The Winds Softly Sigh published in 1981 ISBN 0-919948-77-4
- Sense and Nonsense published in 1989 ISBN 0-920911-78-1, selections from his weekly column written under the name Jonathan Miles, A Countryman's Notebook
