= Rex Renouf =

Canadian politician

George Rex Renouf (1911–1971) was a lawyer and politician in Newfoundland. He represented St. John's South from 1957 to 1959 and from 1962 to 1966 in the Newfoundland House of Assembly.

The son of Charles H. Renouf and Maude Hanrahan, he was born in St. John's and was educated there and at Memorial University College. Renouf studied law with Edward Emerson and was called to the Newfoundland bar in 1939. He ran unsuccessfully for the Twillingate seat in the Newfoundland assembly in 1956 and then was elected in a 1957 by-election. Renouf supported Progressive Conservative leader Malcolm Hollett in opposing Joey Smallwood's 1959 motion against John Diefenbaker in 1957 regarding a dispute on the terms of union with Canada. He was defeated by John R. O'Dea when he ran for reelection to the assembly later that year. He was reelected in 1962 but defeated in 1966.

Renouf was president of the St. John's Canadian National Institute for the Blind and the Newfoundland Historical Society. He was also active in the Society for the Prevention of Cruelty to Animals, the St. John's Rotary Club, the Boy Scouts Association of Newfoundland and the Knights of Columbus. He married Norah Elphinstone.
