= George Norman (Newfoundland politician) =

Canadian politician

Member of the Newfoundland and Labrador House of Assembly for Burgeo-La Poile
- In office 1951–1956
- Preceded by: Herman Quinton
- Succeeded by: John T. Cheeseman

Personal details
- Born: August 25, 1902 Cupids, Newfoundland
- Died: August 25, 1964 (aged 62) St. John's, Newfoundland and Labrador, Canada
- Party: Liberal Party of Newfoundland and Labrador
- Occupation: Railway agent

George Maxwell Norman (August 25, 1902 – August 25, 1964) was a Canadian politician who was elected to the Newfoundland and Labrador House of Assembly in the 1951 provincial election. He represented the electoral district of Burgeo and La Poile as a member of the Liberal Party of Newfoundland and Labrador.

Norman was born in Cupids, Newfoundland to British immigrants. He was an agent operator for the Canadian National Railway and lived at Port aux Basques, Newfoundland. Norman married Mildred Joyce Lacey in 1924 and had two daughters. Norman died on his 62nd birthday of a heart attack, in 1964.
