= Samuel J. Hefferton =

Canadian politician, journalist and educator

Samuel Hefferton

Minister of Education and Minister of Municipal Affairs
- In office April 9, 1949 – May 1, 1957
- Preceded by: Office Established
- Succeeded by: Frederick William Rowe

MHA for Trinity North
- In office 1949–1956
- Succeeded by: Arthur S. Mifflin

Minister of Public Welfare
- In office May 1, 1957 – December 1, 1959
- Preceded by: Beaton Abbott
- Succeeded by: Beaton Abbott

Personal details
- Born: March 28, 1896 Newtown, Dominion of Newfoundland
- Died: February 16, 1980 (aged 83) St. John's, Newfoundland and Labrador
- Party: Liberal Party of Newfoundland and Labrador

Samuel James Hefferton (March 28, 1896 – February 16, 1980) was a Canadian politician, journalist and educator. He represented the electoral district of Trinity North in the Newfoundland and Labrador House of Assembly from 1949 to 1956. He was a member of the Liberal Party of Newfoundland and Labrador.

The son of Jacob and Dinah Jane Hefferton, he was educated in Newton, at Bishop Feild College, at Memorial University, at Queen's University and at London University in England. He began teaching in 1911 but joined the Royal Newfoundland Regiment during World War I. Hefferton married Minnie DeGrish in 1918. After the war, he worked on the Evening Telegram and later served as managing editor for The Industrial Worker. In 1920, Hefferton returned to teaching and was principal for various high schools. He served as president of the Newfoundland Teachers Association from 1942 to 1949.

In 1949, he resigned from teaching. Hefferton served as Minister of Education in the interim government formed by Joey Smallwood and then was elected to the Newfoundland assembly later that year. He served in the Newfoundland cabinet as Minister of Education and then as Minister of Municipal Affairs and Supply and later Minister of Health. He was named Minister of Public Welfare in 1957 but resigned from the assembly in 1959 when he was named chairman of the St. John's Metropolitan Board and also of the Provincial Planning Board. He had resigned from both boards by 1966. He continued to live in St. John's until his death at the age of 83.
