= Raymond Guy =

Canadian businessman and politician

Raymond Winston Guy (July 5, 1912 – November 24, 2000) was a businessperson and politician in Newfoundland. He represented Grand Falls from 1959 to 1962 in the Newfoundland House of Assembly.

The son of Simeon and Jessie Guy, he was born in Musgrave Harbour and was educated there. Guy married Gillian Spooner. He was hired as a clerk by a store in Musgrave Harbour in 1929 and then moved to Grand Falls in 1935 where he was employed as a retail manager. Guy served in the Royal Navy during World War II. He returned to work as a retail manager after the war. After retiring from politics, he returned again to retail work until 1965 when he became deputy director for the Emergency Measures Organization at St. John's. He later served as director for the organization until his retirement in 1977.

Guy founded and was commander for the Windsor Sea Cadets. He held executive positions within the local Independent Order of Odd Fellows, district Freemasons and the provincial branch Royal Canadian Legion.
