= Joseph O'Driscoll =

Newfoundland soldier and politician

Joseph P. O'Driscoll (1899–1978) was a soldier and politician in Newfoundland. He represented Bell Island in the Newfoundland House of Assembly from 1956 to 1959.

The son of Patrick C. O'Driscoll and Margaret Dalton, he was born in St. John's and was educated at Saint Bonaventure's College. O'Driscoll married Amy Chaplin. He joined the Royal Newfoundland Regiment in 1916 and was wounded at Monchy-le-Preux. He returned to the family business in Newfoundland and later served in the Home Defence Force during World War II. O'Driscoll served as president of the St. John's Great War Veterans' Association and as provincial commander of the Royal Canadian Legion. In 1949, he was promoted to lieutenant-colonel and became head of the Royal Newfoundland Regiment.
