= James D. Higgins =

Canadian politician (1913–1974)

James Douglas Higgins, QC (December 4, 1913 – October 10, 1974) was a Canadian lawyer, politician, judge and athlete. He represented St. John's East from 1951 to 1959 in the Newfoundland House of Assembly as a Progressive Conservative. He was the first leader of the United Newfoundland Party which was formed in 1959.

The son of William J. Higgins and Mary Patricia McGirr, he was born in St. John's and was educated at Saint Bonaventure's College and Memorial University. Higgins studied law with Charles Edward Hunt and was called to the Newfoundland bar in 1937. He married Catherine Comerford.

In 1949, he was elected to the municipal council for St. John's; he was reelected in 1953, 1957 and 1961. Higgins served as deputy mayor from 1953 to 1961. He was elected to the Newfoundland assembly in 1951 and was reelected in 1956. In 1959, the Newfoundland Progressive Conservative Party split over a dispute with the Canadian government regarding the terms of union between Newfoundland and Canada. Higgins and Augustine Duffy left he party to form the United Newfoundland Party with John R. O'Dea; Higgins was chosen as leader. However, he was defeated when he ran for reelection in 1959. He ran again unsuccessfully for reelection to the provincial assembly as a Liberal in 1962.

Higgins was named a Queen's Counsel in 1956. He was appointed to the Supreme Court of Newfoundland in 1963. In 1964, he was appointed Knight of the Order of St. Gregory the Great by Pope Paul VI. Higgins chaired a 1966 Royal Commission which recommended an increase in the minimum wage and various other changes to the provincial labour laws. He also chaired the 1973 Newfoundland Electoral Boundaries Commission.

Higgins took part in the Royal St. John's Regatta for many years. He served on the committee for the Regatta from 1930, serving as president from 1949 to 1964 and was later named honorary president for life. He was president of the St. John's Football League from 1939 to 1961. On October 9, 1974, Higgins was named chairman of the board of governors for the Newfoundland Sports Hall of Fame. He died the following day after suffering a heart attack.

He was named to the Sport Newfoundland and Labrador Hall of Fame in 1981.
