= Myles Murray =

Canadian politician and lawyer

Minister of Provincial Affairs
- In office December 15, 1951 – February 15, 1963
- Preceded by: James Spratt
- Succeeded by: John T. Cheeseman

MHA for Ferryland
- In office 1952–1966
- Preceded by: Augustus Duffy
- Succeeded by: Aidan Maloney

Minister of Public Welfare
- In office February 15, 1963 – August 8, 1966
- Preceded by: C. Maxwell Lane
- Succeeded by: Aidan Maloney

Personal details
- Born: October 22, 1906 Murray's Pond, Portugal Cove, Newfoundland Colony
- Died: April 15, 1985 (aged 78) St. John's, Newfoundland and Labrador
- Party: Liberal Party of Newfoundland and Labrador
- Occupation: lawyer

Myles P. Murray (October 22, 1906 – April 15, 1985) was a Canadian politician and lawyer. He represented the electoral district of Ferryland in the Newfoundland and Labrador House of Assembly from 1952 to 1966. He was a member of the Liberal Party of Newfoundland and Labrador.

The son of Mary and Michael Murray, he was born in Murray's Pond, Portugal Cove. Murray was educated at Saint Bonaventure's College and Memorial University College. He articled in the law offices of William R. Howley, was called to the Newfoundland bar in 1930 and set up practice in St. John's. He married Doreen Whitaker in 1941; the couple had two sons. During World War II, he served with the Royal Artillery and then with the Royal Air Force. After the war, Murray joined the Newfoundland Department of Justice. In 1950, he was named King's Counsel.

He ran unsuccessfully in the provincial riding of Harbour Main-Bell Island in 1949. Murray was defeated by two votes in the 1951 election but, during the recount, voting irregularities were noticed and the result of the election was set aside. He won the subsequent by-election held in 1952. Murray served in the Newfoundland cabinet as Minister of Provincial Affairs and then Minister of Public Welfare. He retired from politics in 1966 and was named a magistrate in the District Court for St. John's. He died in St. John's at the age of 78.
