= Malcolm Mercer Hollett =

Canadian politician (1891–1985)

The Honourable Malcolm Mercer Hollett

Senator for Newfoundland (Burin)
- In office 6 October 1961 – 31 March 1971
- Preceded by: Peter John Cashin
- Succeeded by: James Greene

Leader of the Opposition (Newfoundland)
- In office 1953–1959
- Preceded by: Peter John Cashin
- Succeeded by: James Greene

Member of the House of Assembly for St. John's West
- In office 1951–1959
- Preceded by: Peter John Cashin
- Succeeded by: Joey Smallwood

Personal details
- Born: 9 December 1891 Great Burin, Newfoundland
- Died: 23 September 1985 (aged 93) St. John's, Newfoundland, Canada
- Party: Progressive Conservative of Newfoundland; Progressive Conservative Party of Canada
- Other political affiliations: Responsible Government League
- Parents: Henry Hollett (father); Mary Hollett (mother)
- Education: Mount Allison University; University of Oxford

Military service
- Allegiance: Newfoundland
- Branch/service: British Army
- Unit: Royal Newfoundland Regiment
- Battles/wars: First World War

Malcolm Mercer Hollett (December 9, 1891 – September 23, 1985) was a Newfoundland magistrate, politician and Canadian Senator.

The son of Henry and Mary Hollett, he was born in Great Burin and received his early education there and at the Methodist College in St. John's. Hollett was awarded a Rhodes Scholarship in 1915 after graduating from Mount Allison University in New Brunswick but he delayed going to the University of Oxford in order to enlist in the Royal Newfoundland Regiment. He enrolled at Oxford after World War I and graduated with a diploma in economics in 1921.

He returned to Newfoundland after his studies and was appointed magistrate. Hollett led relief efforts after the 1929 Grand Banks earthquake created a tsunami that devastated the communities of the Burin Peninsula where he lived.

Hollett served in the Newfoundland National Convention and was a member of the colony's 1947 delegation to London. He opposed Newfoundland joining Canadian confederation and supported the reinstitution of responsible government. During the 1948 referendums on Newfoundland's future, Hollett was a leading member of the Responsible Government League that campaigned against joining Canada.

He ran and was elected to the House of Assembly as a Progressive Conservative member for St. John's West in 1952. The next year, he became leader of the Progressive Conservative party and Leader of the Opposition.

He led the party through the 1956 election, but was unable to increase the party's seat total beyond the four seats it had when he became leader. Prior to the 1959 provincial election, Hollett faced a revolt when two of his MHAs left to form the more moderate United Newfoundland Party which, unlike Hollett's Conservatives, favoured continued federal subsidies to Newfoundland. During the election itself, Newfoundland Premier and Liberal leader Joey Smallwood challenged Hollett in his own riding and defeated him, reducing the Tories to three seats in the House of Assembly. Hollett resigned as party leader. Smallwood decided to run against Hollett after the Tory leader opposed a government motion of censure against the federal Progressive Conservative government of John Diefenbaker.

He was appointed to the Senate by Diefenbaker in 1961 and sat as a Progressive Conservative. He resigned in 1971 at the age of 80 and returned to Newfoundland. He died in 1985 at the age of 94.
