= John Forsey =

Canadian politician

John A. Forsey

Member of the Newfoundland and Labrador House of Assembly for Humber East
- In office 1956–1962
- Succeeded by: Noel Murphy

Personal details
- Born: 1917
- Died: 1984 (aged 66–67)
- Party: Liberal Party of Newfoundland and Labrador

John Aaron Forsey (1917–1984) was a Canadian politician who was elected to the Newfoundland and Labrador House of Assembly in the 1956 provincial election. He represented the electoral district of Humber East as a member of the Liberal Party of Newfoundland and Labrador. He lived in Corner Brook, Newfoundland and Labrador.
