= Port de Grave (electoral district) =

Former provincial electoral district in Newfoundland and Labrador, Canada

Newfoundland and Labrador electoral district
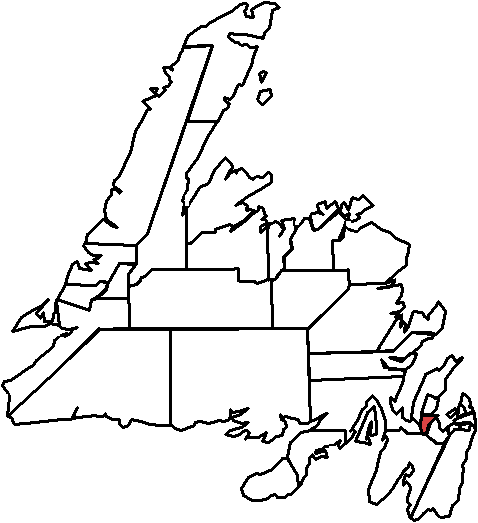
- Port de Grave in relation to other districts in Newfoundland

Defunct provincial electoral district
- Legislature: Newfoundland and Labrador House of Assembly
- District created: 1972
- First contested: 1972
- Last contested: 2011

Demographics
- Population (2006): 12,015
- Electors (2011): 8,914

Port de Grave is a defunct provincial electoral district for the House of Assembly of Newfoundland and Labrador, Canada. Fishing was a prime industry in the district and many people commute to work in the St. John's area. Bay Roberts was an important service centre for the region and there is some light industrial activity. In 2011, there were 8,914 eligible voters living within the district.

The district included the communities of Bay Roberts, Bareneed, Bishop's Cove, Blow Me Down, Bryant's Cove, Hibb's Cove, Port de Grave, Ship Cove, Spaniard's Bay, The Dock, Tilton, and Upper Island Cove.

The district was one of the strongest Liberal regions of the province, and was one of only three districts to return a Liberal MHA in the 2007 election.

The district was abolished in 2015, and was succeeded by the new district of Harbour Grace-Port de Grave.

== Members of the House of Assembly ==
The district has elected the following members of the House of Assembly:

Assembly	Years	Member	Party
29th	1949–1951	George T. Makinson	Liberal
30th	1951–1956	Isaac Mercer	Liberal
31st	1956–1959	Llewellyn Strange	Liberal
32nd	1959–1962	Llewellyn Strange	Liberal
33rd	1962–1966	Eric Dawe	Liberal
34th	1966–1971	Eric Dawe	Liberal
35th	1971–1972	James J. Hussey	Liberal
36th	1972–1975	George Wilson	Progressive Conservative
37th	1975–1979	Eric Dawe	Reform Liberal
38th	1979–1982	Randy Collins	Progressive Conservative
39th	1982–1985	Randy Collins	Progressive Conservative
40th	1985–1989	John Efford	Liberal
41st	1989–1993	John Efford	Liberal
42nd	1993–1996	John Efford	Liberal
43rd	1996–1999	John Efford	Liberal
43rd	1999–2001	John Efford	Liberal
43rd	2001–2003	Roland Butler	Liberal
44th	2003–2007	Roland Butler	Liberal
45th	2007–2011	Roland Butler	Liberal
46th	2011–2015	Glenn Littlejohn	Progressive Conservative

== Election results ==
2011 Newfoundland and Labrador general election
Party	Candidate	Votes	%	±%
Progressive Conservative	Glenn Littlejohn	3,647	60.13%	–
Liberal	Leanne Hussey	2,022	33.34%	
NDP	Sarah Downey	396	6.53%	

2007 Newfoundland and Labrador general election
Party	Candidate	Votes	%	±%
Liberal	Roland Butler	3329	50.75%	
Progressive Conservative	Glenn Littlejohn	3069	46.78%	–
NDP	Randy Wayne Dawe	162	2.47%	

2003 Newfoundland and Labrador general election
Party	Candidate	Votes	%	±%
Liberal	Roland Butler	3983	62.66%	
Progressive Conservative	Clarence Gosse	2374	37.34%	–

By-election, 2001 On resignation of John Efford
Party	Candidate	Votes	%	±%
Liberal	Roland Butler	3309	50.75%	
Progressive Conservative	Ed Neil	3211	49.24%	–

1999 Newfoundland and Labrador general election
Party	Candidate	Votes	%	±%
Liberal	John Efford	4488		
Progressive Conservative	Paul Cooper	1026	–	–
NDP	Steve Quigley	185		

== See also ==
- List of Newfoundland and Labrador provincial electoral districts
- Canadian provincial electoral districts
