= Eric S. Jones =

Canadian magistrate and politician

Eric Jones

MHA for Burin
- In office 1956–1971
- Preceded by: Phillip Forsey
- Succeeded by: Earl Winsor

Minister of Finance
- In office November 5, 1969 – July 26, 1971
- Preceded by: H.R.V. Earle
- Succeeded by: Frederick William Rowe

Minister of Highways
- In office December 7, 1964 – November 5, 1969
- Preceded by: Frederick William Rowe
- Succeeded by: Harold Starkes

Personal details
- Born: Eric Jones

Eric S. Jones (November 27, 1914 – October 30, 1982) was an educator, magistrate and politician in Newfoundland. He represented Burin in the Newfoundland House of Assembly from 1956 to 1966 and Fogo from 1966 to 1971.

The son of Mark and Deborah Jones, he was born in Fogo and was educated there and at Memorial University. From 1930 to 1940, he taught school at Seldom Come By, Bay St. George and Bay of Islands. He was principal of the International Grenfell Association boarding school in Cartwright, Labrador. From 1940 to 1944, he was field secretary of the Canadian Legion educational service in Newfoundland. In 1944, he was named magistrate at Harbour Breton and, in 1955, at Grand Bank. In 1956, he was named to the South Coast Commission.

Jones married Nina Smith; the couple had four children.

He was elected to the Newfoundland assembly in 1956 and was reelected in 1959, 1962 and was elected for Fogo in 1966. He served in the Newfoundland cabinet as Minister of Highways and then as Minister of Finance. He resigned from politics in October 1971, when he was named chair of the Newfoundland Civil Service commission. He died in St. John's at the age of 67.
