= St. John's South (provincial electoral district) =

Former provincial electoral district in Newfoundland and Labrador, Canada

Newfoundland and Labrador electoral district
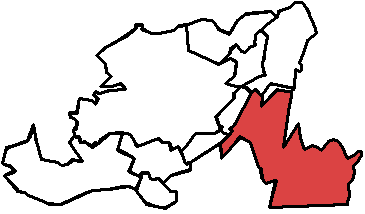
- St. John's South in relation to other districts in St. John's

Provincial electoral district
- Legislature: Newfoundland and Labrador House of Assembly
- Last contested: 2011

Demographics
- Population (2006): 11,832
- Electors (2011): 7,923

St. John's South is a defunct provincial electoral district for the House of Assembly of Newfoundland and Labrador, Canada. As of its final contest in 2011, there were 7,923 eligible voters living within the district.

The riding was created prior to the 1956 election out of parts of St. John's West and Ferryland.

Historically working class in nature, St. John's South includes increasingly prosperous residential pockets. The district covers the traditional "west end" of St. John's (now geographically closer to the centre, due to city expansion), the western section of the downtown core and the south side of the harbour to Cape Spear, including the neighbourhood of Shea Heights. In the 2007 redistribution, four per cent of Kilbride was added. The district was abolished in 2015 and largely replaced by Waterford Valley.

== Members of the House of Assembly ==
The district has elected the following members of the House of Assembly:

Assembly	Years	Member	Party
31st	1956–1957	William Browne	Progressive Conservative
31st	1957–1959	Rex Renouf	Progressive Conservative
32nd	1959–1962	John R. O'Dea	United Newfoundland Party
33rd	1962–1966	Rex Renouf	Progressive Conservative
34th	1966–1971	John A. Nolan	Liberal
35th	1971–1972	Hugh J. Shea	Progressive Conservative
36th	1972–1975	Robert Wells	Progressive Conservative
37th	1975–1979	John Collins	Progressive Conservative
38th	1979–1982	John Collins	Progressive Conservative
39th	1982–1985	John Collins	Progressive Conservative
40th	1985–1989	John Collins	Progressive Conservative
41st	1989–1993	Tom Murphy	Liberal
42nd	1993–1996	Tom Murphy	Liberal
43rd	1996–1999	Tom Osborne	Progressive Conservative
43rd	1999–2003	Tom Osborne	Progressive Conservative
44th	2003–2007	Tom Osborne	Progressive Conservative
45th	2007–2011	Tom Osborne	Progressive Conservative
46th	2011–2012	Tom Osborne	Progressive Conservative
46th	2012–2013	Tom Osborne	Independent
46th	2013–2015	Tom Osborne	Liberal

== Election results ==
2011 Newfoundland and Labrador general election
Party	Candidate	Votes	%	±%
Progressive Conservative	Tom Osborne	2,966	57.90%	–
NDP	Keith Dunne	1,994	38.92%	
Liberal	Trevor Hickey	163	3.18%	

2007 Newfoundland and Labrador general election
Party	Candidate	Votes	%	±%
Progressive Conservative	Tom Osborne	3887	79.6%	–
NDP	Clyde Bridger	571	11.69%	
Liberal	Rex Gibbons	425	8.7%	

2003 Newfoundland and Labrador general election
Party	Candidate	Votes	%	±%
Progressive Conservative	Tom Osborne	4,532	–	–
Liberal	Dennis O'Keefe*	756		
NDP	Tom McGinnis	676		

- Dennis O'Keefe who ran as the Liberal candidate is not the same Dennis O'Keefe that served as Mayor of St. John's.

1999 Newfoundland general election
Party	Candidate	Votes	%	±%
Progressive Conservative	Tom Osborne	4,041	66.32%	–
Liberal	Patrick Kennedy	1563	25.65%	
NDP	Judy Vanata	374	6.14%	
Independent	Jason Crummey	101	1.66%	

1996 Newfoundland general election
Party	Candidate	Votes	%	±%
Progressive Conservative	Tom Osborne	2,521	42.17%	–
Liberal	Tom Murphy	2,417	40.43%	
NDP	Sue Skipton	858	14.35%	
Independent	Bill Maddigan	155	2.59%	

1993 Newfoundland general election
Party	Candidate	Votes	%	±%
Liberal	Tom Murphy	2,432	47.97%	
Progressive Conservative	Jerome Quinlan	2,040	40.24%	–
NDP	Bert Pitcher	576	11.36%	

1989 Newfoundland general election
Party	Candidate	Votes	%	±%
Liberal	Thomas Murphy	2107		
Progressive Conservative	Douglas Atkinson	2105	–	–
NDP	Linda Hyde	679		

1985 Newfoundland general election
Party	Candidate	Votes	%	±%
Progressive Conservative	John Collins	2466	–	–
Liberal	Dolores Linehan	1145		
NDP	Bob Matthews	924		

1982 Newfoundland general election
Party	Candidate	Votes	%	±%
Progressive Conservative	John Collins	2286	–	–
Liberal	Ernest Antle	582		
NDP	Barbara Roberts	235		

== See also ==
- List of Newfoundland and Labrador provincial electoral districts
- Canadian provincial electoral districts
