= Edward Spencer (Canadian politician) =

Canadian civil engineer and politician

MHA Grand Falls
- In office 1949–1966
- Preceded by: Office Established
- Succeeded by: Raymond Guy

Minister of Public Works
- In office June 22, 1949 – May 1, 1957
- Preceded by: Office Established
- Succeeded by: James Chalker

Minister of Finance
- In office February 25, 1957 – December 7, 1964
- Preceded by: Greg Power
- Succeeded by: Frederick William Rowe

Personal details
- Born: Edward Spencer

Edward Samuel Spencer (January 2, 1893 – June 17, 1973) was a civil engineer and politician in Newfoundland. He represented Grand Falls from 1949 to 1959, Bonavista North from 1959 to 1962 and Fogo from 1962 to 1966 in the Newfoundland House of Assembly.

The son of Edward Thomas Spencer and Sarah Roberts, he was born in Pilley's Island and received his primary education in Newfoundland, going on to study engineering with the International Correspondence School of Scranton, Pennsylvania. He began work with the Nova Scotia Steel Company at Wabana in 1908, as a surveyor and then assistant engineer. In 1914, Spencer married Daisie E. Sellars. In 1923, he became work as an engineer working on highways for the Newfoundland government. He was in charge of construction of the Botwood seaplane base and then was maintenance engineer at Gander airport. Spencer worked at the Royal Canadian Air Force station at North Bay, Ontario during World War II. In 1945, he became a field engineer for the Canadian National Railway. He returned to Newfoundland as a building superintendent for Gander airport.

Spencer ran unsuccessfully for the St. Barbe seat in the Newfoundland assembly in 1932. He was elected to the assembly in 1949. He served 15 years in the provincial cabinet as Minister of Public Works and then as Minister of Finance. He retired from politics in 1966.

Spencer received the Belgian Order of the Crown in 1946 for rescue work following the crash of a Belgian airliner.
