= Beaton Abbott =

Canadian educator and politician

Member of the Newfoundland House of Assembly for Bonavista North
- In office September 8, 1966 – October 28, 1971
- Preceded by: Joey Smallwood
- Succeeded by: Paul Thoms

Member of the Newfoundland House of Assembly for Gander
- In office October 2, 1956 – September 8, 1966
- Preceded by: Edward Spencer (as MHA for Grand Falls)
- Succeeded by: Charles Granger

Personal details
- Born: April 1903 Musgrave Harbour, Newfoundland Colony
- Died: March 8, 1992 (aged 88) Musgrave Harbour, Newfoundland, Canada
- Party: Liberal (1956–69); Independent (1969–71)
- Occupation: Educator, magistrate

Beaton John Abbott (April 1903 – March 8, 1992) was an educator, magistrate and politician in Newfoundland. He represented Gander from 1956 to 1966 and Bonavista North from 1966 to 1971 in the Newfoundland House of Assembly.

== Early life and career ==
Abbott was born in Musgrave Harbour as the son of Samson Abbott and Ellen Whiteway. After graduating from the local school there, he was educated at St. John's Methodist College and at La Salle. Abbott taught school for thirteen years and then served as a magistrate at Twillingate, Grand Bank and Grand Falls over a 21-year period. He was a member of the United Church General Council from 1952 to 1956 and was president of the Newfoundland Bible Society from 1959 to 1968.

== Politics ==
He was first elected to the Newfoundland assembly in 1956. He served in the Newfoundland cabinet as Minister of Public Welfare, Minister of Municipal Affairs and Supply, Minister of Supply and Minister of Municipal Affairs and Housing. Abbott resigned from cabinet in 1968. He died on March 8, 1992.
