= Llewellyn Strange =

Canadian police chief and politician

Llewellyn Strange (1892–1973) was a Newfoundland-born Canadian police chief and politician.

Llewellyn was born to John and Jane E. Strange in Port de Grave and educated here. He married Mary Ellen Morgan and worked in a fishery until, in 1921, he joined the Newfoundland constabulary. There he worked in the criminal investigation division from 1926 until 1933, when he became head constable. In 1934, he became assistant chief of police and a justice of the peace. In January 1945, he was named the constabulary's commanding officer. He retired in 1956.

Strange was elected to the Newfoundland House of Assembly in 1956, representing the Port de Grave district, and reelected in 1959. He retired from politics in 1962, remaining in Port de Grave, where he died in 1973, aged roughly 80.
