= Stephen K. Smith =

Canadian soldier and politician

Stephen Kevin Smith (1894 – November 1981) was a soldier and politician in Newfoundland. He represented Port au Port in the Newfoundland House of Assembly from 1956 to 1966.

The son of John Smith and Mary Hutchings, he was born in Harbour Breton and was educated at Saint Bonaventure's College. Smith served in the Royal Newfoundland Regiment during World War I and was wounded at Beaumont-Hamel and at Bailleul; he reached the rank of lieutenant. Smith served as Newfoundland trade commissioner in Portugal from 1921 to 1923. In 1925, he became fire and safety superintendent for the Newfoundland Power and Paper Company at Corner Brook; in 1935, he was named manager for the company townsite. He was president of the Corner Brook Great War Veterans Association. During World War II, he was commander of the Newfoundland Home Guard at Corner Brook. He married Molly Way.

Smith was elected to the Newfoundland assembly in 1956 and was reelected two more times. He died in 1981.
