= C. Maxwell Lane =

Canadian politician

Maxwell Lane

MHA for White Bay
- In office 1956–1962
- Succeeded by: Walter C. Carter

MHA for Trinity North
- In office 1966–1971
- Preceded by: Uriah Strickland
- Succeeded by: Arthur S. Mifflin

Personal details
- Born: September 20, 1905 Salvage, Newfoundland Colony
- Died: April 1993 (aged 87) St. John's, Newfoundland and Labrador
- Party: Liberal Party of Newfoundland and Labrador
- Occupation: Teacher, Stipendiary Magistrate

Charles Maxwell Lane (September 20, 1905 – April 1993) was a Canadian educator, stipendiary magistrate and politician. He represented the electoral districts of White Bay North and Trinity North in the Newfoundland and Labrador House of Assembly as a member of the Liberal Party of Newfoundland and Labrador.

The son of Charles and Adelaide Lane, he was born in Salvage and was educated at Bishop Feild College and Memorial University. Lane married Hilda Eliza Eugenie Wareham; the couple had three children. He served as a magistrate from 1940 to 1951. He was the first general secretary of the Newfoundland Federation of Fishermen, also serving as chair. In 1959, he was chosen as president of the government-sponsored Newfoundland Brotherhood of Woodworkers. Lane served in the provincial cabinet as Minister of Public Welfare, Minister of Fisheries and Mines and Minister of Agriculture and Resources. He retired from politics in 1971.

He died in St. John's in 1993.
