= John T. Cheeseman =

Canadian politician (1892–1968)

Member of the Newfoundland House of Assembly for Hermitage
- In office November 19, 1962 – September 8, 1966
- Preceded by: John Courage
- Succeeded by: Abel Wornell

Member of the Newfoundland House of Assembly for Burgeo-LaPoile
- In office October 2, 1956 – November 19, 1962
- Preceded by: George Norman
- Succeeded by: Walter Hodder

Member of the Newfoundland House of Assembly for Burin
- In office November 3, 1919 – May 3, 1923 Serving with Samuel Foote
- Preceded by: John S. Currie; Thomas LeFeuvre
- Succeeded by: George Harris

Personal details
- Born: August 3, 1892 Port au Bras, Newfoundland Colony
- Died: February 22, 1968 (aged 75) St. John's, Newfoundland, Canada
- Party: Liberal Reform (1919–23); Liberal (1956–66)
- Spouse: Mona Ludlow
- Children: 2
- Education: Bishop Feild College
- Occupation: Merchant

John Thomas Cheeseman (August 3, 1892 – February 22, 1968) was a businessman and politician in Newfoundland. He represented Burin from 1919 to 1923, Burgeo-LaPoile from 1956 to 1962 and Hermitage from 1962 to 1966.

== Early life and career ==
The son of Lawrence Cheeseman, he was born in Port au Bras and was educated there and at Bishop Feild College. Cheeseman worked for a time in his father's fishery business, then became manager of the Burin Import and Export Company and finally opened his own business around 1930. Cheeseman married Mona Ludlow; the couple had two sons.

== Politics and legacy ==
Cheeseman was elected to the House of Assembly in 1919, but he was defeated when he ran for reelection in 1923 Newfoundland general election. He was again elected to the House of Assembly over thirty years later in 1956 after Newfoundland had joined Canada.

Cheeseman was appointed Chief Inspector of Fisheries and then Chief Fisheries Officer for Newfoundland. He later served in the Newfoundland Executive Council as Minister of Fisheries and Co-Operatives and then as Minister of Provincial Affairs. He retired from the assembly in 1966.

Cheeseman's son son Roy also served in the Newfoundland assembly. A Newfoundland provincial park, John T. Cheeseman Provincial Park, was named in his honour.
