= James M. McGrath =

Canadian doctor and politician

Doctor James Michael Francis McGrath (August 29, 1902 – 1975) was a physician and politician in Newfoundland. He represented St. Mary's in the Newfoundland House of Assembly from 1956 to 1971.

The son of James Francis McGrath and Mary Aylward, he was born in St. John's, Colony of Newfoundland and educated at Saint Bonaventure's College and the National University of Ireland. McGrath also pursued post-graduate studies at Kentucky State University. In 1931, he married Anita Marie Kearney. McGrath was medical officer at St. Mary's Bay from 1928 to 1938; he also served as local stipendiary magistrate from 1928 to 1935. He was director of the Avalon Health Unit at Harbour Grace from 1938 to 1943 and Assistant Deputy Minister of Health for Newfoundland from 1943 to 1956.

He was first elected to the Newfoundland assembly in 1956. He served in the provincial cabinet as Minister of Health and as Minister of Finance. McGrath retired from politics in 1971. He published a book of poems privately before he died in 1975.
