= Isaac Mercer =

Canadian lawyer and politician

Isaac Mercer (September 3, 1912 – August 5, 2002) was a lawyer and politician in Newfoundland. He represented Port de Grave from 1951 to 1956 and Fogo from 1956 to 1961 in the Newfoundland House of Assembly.

The son of William and Maria Mercer, he was born in Sunnyside, Trinity Bay in 1912 and was educated in local schools, at Bishop Feild College, at Memorial University and at Dalhousie University. He was admitted to the bars of Newfoundland and Nova Scotia in 1938 and began the practice of law in St. John's. In 1942, Mercer married Ruby Tucker. He formed a law firm in partnership with Arthur S. Mifflin and Fabian O'Dea. In 1948, Mercer was named King's Counsel.

He was first elected to the Newfoundland assembly in 1951. After leaving politics in 1961, Mercer continued to practice law until 1977. In 1989, he was named an honorary life member of the Canadian Bar Association. He died in 2002.
