= William R. Smallwood =

Canadian politician

William Smallwood

MHA for Green Bay
- In office 1956–1971
- Preceded by: Baxter Morgan
- Succeeded by: Harold Starkes

Personal details
- Born: September 30, 1928 Corner Brook, Dominion of Newfoundland
- Died: October 30, 2001 (aged 73) St. John's, Newfoundland and Labrador, Canada
- Party: Liberal
- Relations: Joey Smallwood (father)
- Occupation: Lawyer

William Richard Smallwood (September 30, 1928 – October 30, 2001) was a Canadian politician. He represented the electoral district of Green Bay in the Newfoundland and Labrador House of Assembly from 1956 to 1971. He was a member of the Liberal Party. He was born in Corner Brook in 1928, the son of Newfoundland Premier and Canadian Father of Confederation, Joey Smallwood, and his wife Clara Oates. He was their second child and had an older brother, Ramsay and younger sister, Clara. He attended the Curtis Academy, Memorial University, and Dalhousie University, earning an LL.B. degree. He was a lawyer in St. John's.

On May 27, 1971, Smallwood assaulted William Marshall on the floor of the House, and was issued a five-day suspension. John Crosbie was given a three-day suspension after accusing Joey Smallwood of approving of William's behavior, while Marshall and H.R.V. Earle were suspended for criticising Speaker Clarke.

In 1983, he suffered stab wounds in an altercation with his son, who was charged with attempted murder. The charges were withdrawn due to insufficient evidence. He died in St. John's, Newfoundland and Labrador in 2001.
