= George Nightingale =

English-born machinist and politician in Newfoundland

George Maurice Nightingale (June 5, 1893 – December 11, 1964) was an English-born machinist and politician in Newfoundland. He represented St. John's North in the Newfoundland House of Assembly from 1956 to 1962.

The son of Robert and Harriet Nightingale, he was born in Liverpool and was educated at Liverpool Technical Institute. Nightingale came to St. John's in 1911 and worked under contract for an engineering company there. From 1915 to 1918, he worked as a mechanic for the Royal Flying Corps. After the war, he set up a garage and car dealership. Nightingale married Violet Noseworthy; the couple had three children. His daughter Florence became an actress, Florence Paterson.

He served on St. John's City Council as an alderman from 1949 to 1961, serving as deputy mayor and as a traffic commissioner. Nightingale was defeated when he ran for reelection to city council in 1961. He was elected to the Newfoundland assembly in 1956 and was reelected in 1959.
