= Uriah Strickland =

Canadian politician

Member of the House of Assembly for Trinity North
- In office 1971–1972
- Preceded by: Charlie Brett
- Succeeded by: C. Maxwell Lane

Member of the House of Assembly for Trinity South
- In office 1960–1971
- Preceded by: Samuel Hefferton
- Succeeded by: Rupert Bartlett

Member of the House of Assembly for Bonavista South
- In office 1956–1959
- Preceded by: Clyde Brown
- Succeeded by: Rossy Barbour

Personal details
- Born: November 7, 1907 Hants Harbour, Dominion of Newfoundland
- Died: March 16, 1976 (aged 68) St. John's, Newfoundland, Canada
- Party: Liberal
- Spouse(s): Susan Short m. 25 Nov 1931
- Parents: George Strickland (father); Mary Ann Strickland (mother)
- Education: Memorial University
- Occupation: master mariner

Uriah Fifield Strickland (November 7, 1907 – March 16, 1976) was a Canadian politician and master mariner. He represented the electoral districts of Bonavista South, Trinity South, and Trinity North in the Newfoundland and Labrador House of Assembly. He was a member of the Liberal Party of Newfoundland.

The son of George and Mary Ann Strickland, he was born in Hants Harbour, Newfoundland and was educated at the Salvation Army College in St. John's and at Memorial University. Strickland was employed in fishing at Hants Harbour and then taught school for a time. He then earned his papers as a master mariner.

He was first elected to the Newfoundland assembly in 1956 for Bonavista South. He was elected for Trinity South in 1959. Strickland served in the provincial cabinet as Minister of Municipal Affairs and Housing. He was elected for Trinity North in 1971 but was defeated when he ran for reelection in 1972.
