= Fogo (electoral district) =

Former electoral district in Newfoundland and Labrador

Fogo was a provincial electoral district that was represented in the Newfoundland House of Assembly in Canada.

The riding existed from when Newfoundland joined Confederation in 1949 until 1996 when it was merged with the riding of Twillingate to become Twillingate-Fogo.

For the entirety of its existence, it consisted of Fogo Island, the Straight Shore area and the Gander Bay area. The only change in boundaries came before the 1975 election when Horwood and Change Islands were removed from the riding and added to Lewisporte.

== Members of the House of Assembly ==
The district has elected the following members of the House of Assembly:

=== Fogo ===
Member	Party	Term
Beaton Tulk	Liberal	1993-1996
Sam Winsor	Progressive Conservative	1989-1993
Beaton Tulk	Liberal	1979-1989
Earl Winsor	Liberal	1971-1979
Eric Jones	Liberal	1966-1971
Edward Spencer	Liberal	1962-1966
Isaac Mercer	Liberal	1956-1962
Gordon Janes	Liberal	1949-1956

== Election results ==
1993 Newfoundland general election
Party	Candidate	Votes	%	±%
Liberal	Beaton Tulk	3,295	54.09	+4.89
Progressive Conservative	Sam Winsor	2,663	43.71	-7.09
New Democratic	Sam Kelly	134	2.20	
Total valid votes		6,092	99.74	
Total rejected ballots		16	0.26	-0.08
Turnout		6,108	88.47	+3.62
Eligible voters		6,904		
Liberal gain from Progressive Conservative		Swing		+5.99
Source: Elections Newfoundland and Labrador

1989 Newfoundland general election
Party	Candidate	Votes	%	±%
Progressive Conservative	Sam Winsor	2,966	50.81	+6.60
Liberal	Beaton Tulk	2,872	49.19	-4.33
Total valid votes		5,838	99.66	
Total rejected ballots		20	0.34	+0.17
Turnout		5,858	84.85	+0.71
Eligible voters		6,904		
Progressive Conservative gain from Liberal		Swing		+5.47
Source: Elections Newfoundland and Labrador

1985 Newfoundland general election
Party	Candidate	Votes	%	±%
Liberal	Beaton Tulk	3,124	53.53	+0.94
Progressive Conservative	Wayne Frank Wheaton	2,580	44.21	-3.21
New Democratic	Hayward Cross	132	2.26	
Total valid votes		5,836	99.83	
Total rejected ballots		10	0.17	-0.25
Turnout		5,846	84.14	+0.31
Eligible voters		6,948		
Liberal hold		Swing		+2.07
Source: Elections Newfoundland and Labrador

1982 Newfoundland general election
Party	Candidate	Votes	%	±%
Liberal	Beaton Tulk	2,704	52.59	-0.01
Progressive Conservative	Manson Sheppard	2,438	47.41	+2.87
Total valid votes		5,142	99.57	
Total rejected ballots		22	0.43	+0.10
Turnout		5,164	83.83	+8.77
Eligible voters		6,160		
Liberal hold		Swing		-1.44
Source: Elections Newfoundland and Labrador
