= Sam Drover =

Canadian politician

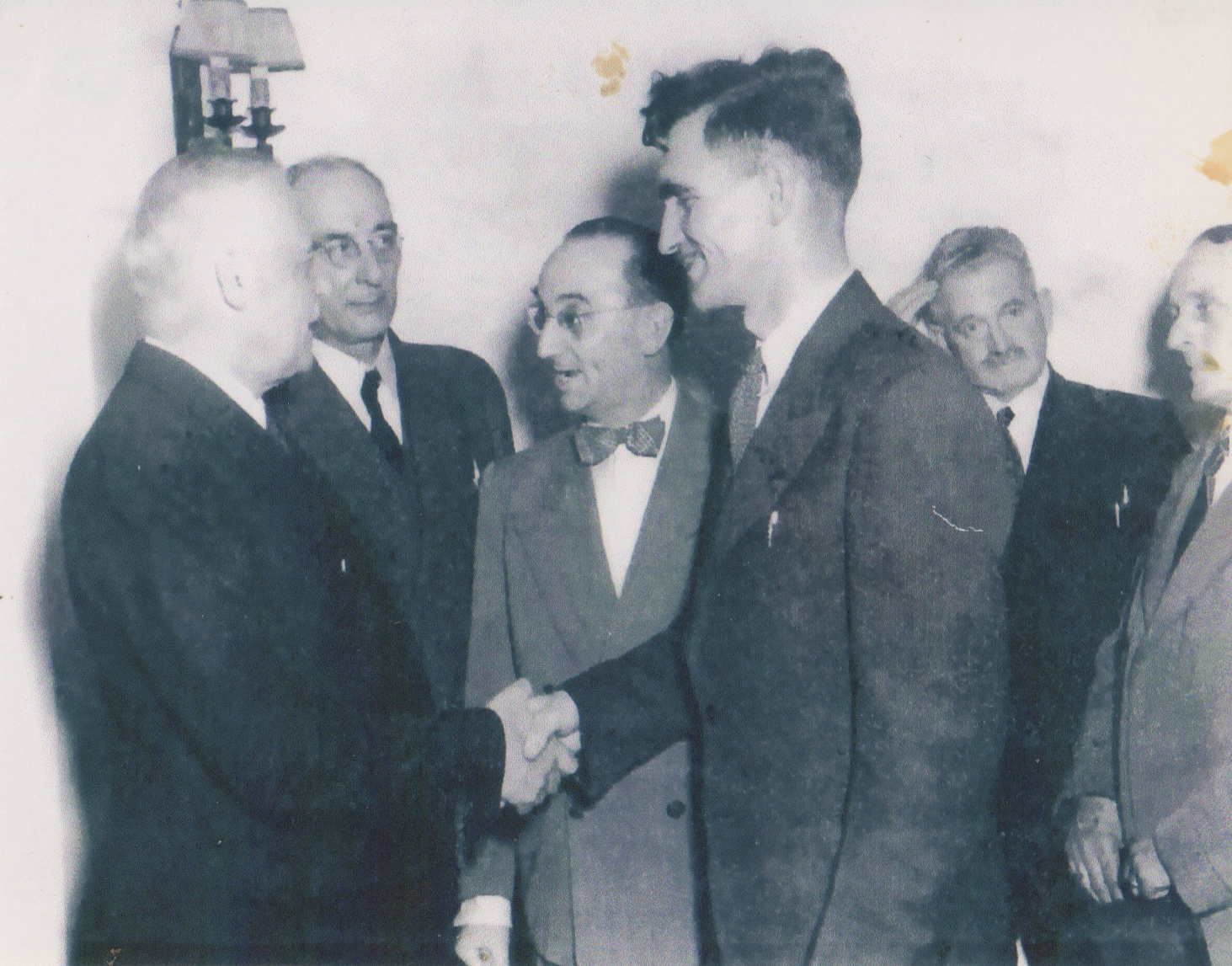
Samuel Drover (right) shaking hands with Louis St. Laurent (left)

Samuel Drover (1911 in Hodge's Cove, Trinity Bay, Dominion of Newfoundland – June 20, 2005) was a longtime member of Newfoundland's House of Assembly and founded the Newfoundland Co-operative Commonwealth Federation (CCF), a social democratic political party.

Drover was educated in Hodge's Cove and at Memorial University. He taught school from 1929 until 1938, when he joined the Royal Newfoundland Constabulary. Drover tried to enlist in the Royal Air Force in 1942 but was not accepted. He then joined the Newfoundland Ranger Force, serving until 1949.

He was originally elected as a Liberal member of the House of Assembly in the 1949 election, which was the first after the dominion of Newfoundland joined the Canadian confederation as a province. He was re-elected in 1951. Drover became disenchanted with Premier Joey Smallwood's government because he believed that it ignored the problems of rural poverty.

He crossed the floor to the CCF in 1955, becoming the first CCF member in Newfoundland. He helped form the new party and became its leader. The CCF fielded ten candidates in the 1956 election. The party won no seats, however, and he lost his own seat in the riding now known as Trinity North. It would take three decades before the CCF's successor, the New Democratic Party, was able to win a seat in the legislature. Following his defeat, Drover started his own business in Hodge's Cove.

Drover ran in the 1965 federal election as an "independent Liberal" in Trinity—Conception and in the 1972 election as an independent candidate in Bonavista—Trinity—Conception. On both occasions he came in fourth, behind the three major parties.
