= Arthur S. Mifflin =

Canadian judge and politician

MHA for Trinity North
- In office 1956–1966
- Preceded by: Samuel J. Hefferton
- Succeeded by: C. Maxwell Lane

Personal details
- Born: June 19, 1920 Catalina, Dominion of Newfoundland
- Died: April 16, 2010 (aged 89) St. John's, Newfoundland and Labrador
- Party: Liberal Party of Newfoundland and Labrador
- Occupation: lawyer

Arthur Samuel Mifflin (June 19, 1920 – April 16, 2010) was a Canadian politician and judge. He represented the electoral district of Trinity North in the Newfoundland and Labrador House of Assembly from 1956 to 1966. He was a member of the Liberal Party of Newfoundland and Labrador.

The son of Samuel W. Mifflin and Blanche Manuel, he was born in Catalina and was educated in Catalina, at Memorial University College, at the University of King's College and at Dalhousie University. Mifflin was called to the Newfoundland bar in 1947 and set up practice in St. John's. He was named Queen's Counsel in 1958. In 1964, he was named to the Supreme Court of Newfoundland. In 1975, he was named Chief Justice in the Trials Division of the Supreme Court and he was Chief Justice for the Appeals Division from 1979 until 1986, when he was named a supernumerary justice.

He died at St. Clare's Mercy Hospital in St. John's at the age of 89.
