= Bishop Feild College =

Canadian school

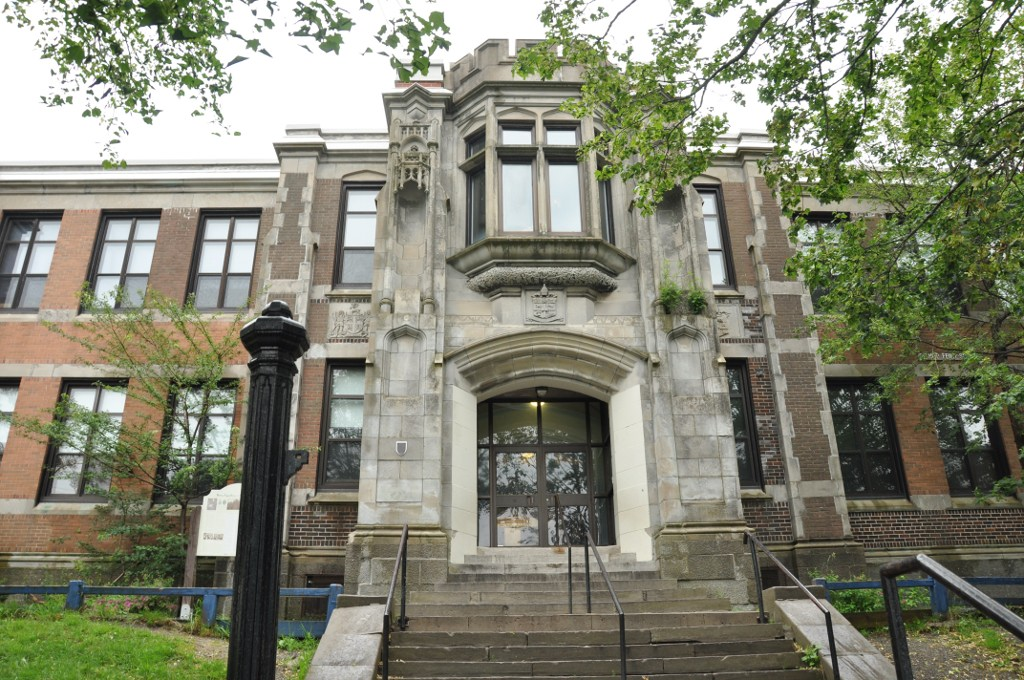
- Bishop Field College

General information
- Architectural style: Collegiate Gothic Revival
- Location: Bond St, St. John's, NL, Canada
- Coordinates: 47.5695336°N 52.7059596°W
- Construction started: 1926

Design and construction
- Architect: Eustace G. Bird
- Engineer: Anglin-Norcross Ltd.

Bishop Feild School
- Bond Street, St. John's, NL; Canada

Information
- Type: Private
- Established: 1844
- Grades: K-6
- Enrollment: 350
- Campus: Urban
- Website: Bishop Feild School official website

Bishop Feild College (originally Church of England Academy; formerly Church of England College and Bishop Feild School; currently Bishop Feild Elementary), founded in 1844, is a school in St. John's, Newfoundland. Founded as the Church of England Academy, it was renamed in 1892 as the Church of England College in 1892, before its 1894 name change to Bishop Feild College. The renaming was in honor of Bishop Edward Feild, a school inspector and second bishop of Newfoundland.

Originally an Anglican-affiliated boys school of the Newfoundland Cathedral, it later also admitted girls. BFC has functioned as a middle school and secondary school, but it now only admits students through grade 6. An independent private school until the 1960s, it eventually joined the school board. It is a member of the International League of Peaceful Schools. It currently teaches approximately 350 children in grades Kindergarten to Grade 6 that offers an English language stream as well as an Early French Immersion Program.

Early headmasters of BFC came from England. Ralph Robinson Wood was the first headmaster born in Newfoundland. BFC alumni are referred to as "Old Feildians".

The Feildian was a monthly magazine pertaining to BFC and other Church of England schools in Newfoundland. Its objectives were to foster school spirit while chronicling the school's affairs through content such as correspondence, news, sports, and an alumni section. Established in 1893, it ceased publication in 1960. It was the first publication of its kind in Newfoundland.

== Building ==
The current building, located at 46 Bond Street and built in 1926 by Anglin and Norcross, was designed by the architect Eustace G. Bird in Collegiate Gothic Revival style. This style was typical for Church of England buildings that were commissioned under Bishop Feild as he sought a "high-church" tone set around the Anglican Church. The building plan is a rectangular, long façade. Its defining elements include crenellation and rusticated stone. Indiana limestone is used, with limestone quoining at corners. At the entranceway, there are places that represent the coasts of arms of the school, city, province, and the diocese. Large windows are also located at the entranceway. Keystone trim can be found around windows. BFC was named as a Registered Heritage Structure by the Heritage Foundation of Newfoundland and Labrador in June 1994.

== Alumni ==
- Thomas Ricketts
- William G. Adams
- Hugh Abercrombie Anderson
- John Murray Anderson
- Andrew Carnell
- Chesley William Carter
- John T. Cheeseman
- William Coaker
- Eric Dawe
- Ewart John Arlington Harnum
- William Richard Kent
- Walter Learning
- Moses Morgan
- John Shannon Munn
- Leonard Outerbridge
- Bill Rompkey
- Jack Henry Scammell
- Reginald F. Sparkes
- William Warren
- Owen William Steele

== Academics ==
- Arthur Barnes, vice-principal
