= Prince of Wales Collegiate =

Location
- 24 Paton Street; St. John's, Newfoundland and Labrador, A1B 3E7; Canada; 47°34′01.00″N 52°44′20.00″W

Information
- Type: Public
- Founded: 1959
- School district: Newfoundland and Labrador English School District
- Principal: Roger Butler
- Staff: 45
- Grades: 9–13
- Enrolment: 762 (2017)
- Language: English; French
- Nickname: Cavalier
- Website: pwc.nlesd.ca

Prince of Wales Collegiate (PWC) is a public high school located in St. John's, Newfoundland and Labrador, Canada. It served part of St. John's as well as the community of Portugal Cove-St. Philip's.

The school was erected in 1959. At that time it was called United Collegiate and along with Prince of Wales College on LeMarchant Road was governed by The United Church School Board. In 1962, Prince of Wales College closed as a high school and this school was renamed Prince of Wales Collegiate. A major extension to the original building was erected in 1993.

Prince of Wales offers a number of Advanced Placement courses and concurrent studies affiliated with Memorial University. They offer local courses in French Immersion, Spanish, Russian and Italian that come with the opportunity for international travel, and strong programs in arts, theatre and music. A wide variety of extracurricular activities are available, including a wide variety of boys' and girls' athletic teams and special interest clubs.

== History ==
Wesleyan-Methodist Academy opened in 1860 on Longs Hill. It was a wooden building.

In 1874 the name Wesleyan-Academy changed to Methodist Academy when the Newfoundland Conference of the Methodist Church of Canada was formed. It was administered by a Board of Directors.

1886 a major expansion and reconstruction program to the building, adding a Model school (teacher training) and a students’ residence (the College Home). The Academy was now reconstituted as the Methodist College, and the Board of Directors was replaced by a Board of Governors. The College was formally known as The Newfoundland Methodist College.

The entire complex was destroyed in the Great Fire of July 1892.

In 1894 a new, much larger building was erected on the site, as well as a new College Home.

Edward, Prince of Wales (later King Edward VIII) was visiting Newfoundland in 1919 and laid the corner stone for the proposed new Methodist College—later named Prince of Wales College.

In January 1925, just six months before it would have become the United Church College (in keeping with Church Union in June of that year), the building, like its predecessor, fell victim to fire. The main structure of the building was salvaged.

1926 a new building was built from the old and named Holloway School, in honor of Robert Holloway, former principal of the Methodist College.

In 1928 Prince of Wales College on LeMarchant Road opened as a secondary school and Holloway School became an elementary school.

Harrington School opened in 1956, due to increased enrolment, and accommodated kindergarten and grade one.

Circa 1957, again due to a lack of space, Prince of Wales Annex on LeMarchant Road opened for Grade six.

In 1960, the present building on Paton Street opened as The United Church Regional High School, United Collegiate. The students came from Macpherson and Curtis Academy in that first year. The school was renamed Prince of Wales Collegiate in 1963.

For the 2024–25 school year, the school was reconfigured as a Grade 9 to Level IV school.

== Attack ==
On 9 March 2023, during the school lunch break, multiple assailants arrived at Prince of Wales Collegiate with weapons and attacked a student on the school's front steps. The victim was hospitalized with multiple head injuries. Five teenagers were arrested and charged with attempted murder; all five pleaded guilty to aggravated assault, receiving sentences of 18 to 24 months.

== Notable alumni ==
- Sir Richard Squires, 6th Prime Minister of Newfoundland (1919–1923; 1928–1932).

== See also ==
- Royal eponyms in Canada
