= John R. O'Dea =

Newfoundland politician

John Roche O'Dea (April 17, 1915 – June 6, 1998) was a business owner and politician in Newfoundland. He represented St. John's South from 1959 to 1962 in the Newfoundland House of Assembly as a member of the United Newfoundland Party.

== Family ==
The brother of Fabian O'Dea, who served as lieutenant governor of Newfoundland in the 1960s, John Roche O'Dea was the son of John V. O'Dea and May (Coady) O'Dea, he was born in St. John's and educated at Saint Bonaventure's College, Loyola College and Memorial University College.

O'Dea married Madeleine Connolly; the couple had five children, including Brian O'Dea.

== Life and career ==
He began work with Newfoundland Brewery Ltd in 1934, later becoming managing director and then becoming president in 1963. O'Dea founded the United Newfoundland Party with Augustine Duffy in 1959. He was elected to the Newfoundland Assembly later that year; he was defeated in 1962 when he ran for reelection as a Liberal. Newfoundland Brewery had been taken over by Molson and, in 1968, he established a new brewery, Atlantic Brewing Co., at Stephenville. O'Dea was named chair of St. John's Metro Board in 1971.

O'Dea died in St. John's on June 6, 1998.
