= Earl Winsor =

Canadian politician (1918–1989)

The Honourable Earl Winsor MHA

Minister of Fisheries
- In office July 26, 1971 – January 18, 1972
- Premier: Joey Smallwood
- Preceded by: Aidan Maloney
- Succeeded by: Frank Moores

Member of the Newfoundland House of Assembly for Fogo
- In office October 28, 1971 – June 18, 1979
- Preceded by: Eric S. Jones
- Succeeded by: Beaton Tulk

Member of the Newfoundland House of Assembly for Labrador North
- In office October 2, 1959 – October 28, 1971
- Preceded by: Frederick W. Rowe (as MHA for Labrador)
- Succeeded by: Melvin Woodward

Personal details
- Born: Earl Wilfred Winsor; July 7, 1918 Wesleyville, Newfoundland
- Died: April 10, 1989 (aged 70) St. John's, Newfoundland, Canada
- Party: Liberal
- Spouse: Sarah Elizabeth Penney
- Education: Memorial University
- Profession: Master mariner

Earl Wilfred Winsor (July 7, 1918 – April 10, 1989) was a master mariner and politician in Newfoundland. He represented Labrador North from 1956 to 1971 and Fogo from 1971 to 1979 in the Newfoundland House of Assembly.

The son of Joshua and Blanche Winsor, he was born in Wesleyville and was educated there and at Memorial University. He worked as a wireless operator and served in the merchant navy during World War II. After the war, he was captain of several ships in the Labrador area. He was also a director of the Winsor Trading Company.

Winsor served in the Newfoundland cabinet as Minister of Labrador Affairs and then as Minister of Fisheries. He was a member of the Masonic Order, the Orange Association, the St. John's Board of Trade and the Royal Canadian Legion.

A ferry operating in the Fogo area was renamed the MV Captain Earl W. Winsor in 1998.
