= Leslie Curtis =

Canadian lawyer and politician

Leslie Roy Curtis (October 27, 1895 – January 16, 1980) was a lawyer and politician in Newfoundland. He represented Twillingate in the Newfoundland House of Assembly from 1949 to 1971.

The son of the Reverend Dr. Levi Curtis and Lillie B. Black, he was born in Twillingate and was educated at the Methodist College in St. John's. He studied law with Richard Squires and was called to the Newfoundland bar in 1920. In 1931, he was named King's Counsel. Curtis had become a senior partner in Squires' law firm by 1935 and he set up his own firm in 1939. He was elected to the Newfoundland assembly in 1949. Curtis served as Minister of Justice and Attorney General from 1949 to 1966. In 1966, he was named president of the Privy Council.

In 1923, Curtis married Marie E. Kendall.

Curtis was described, in Harold Horwood's biography of Smallwood, as "the only able minister [in Smallwood's first cabinet] who could cope with Smallwood's approach, the toughest, most pragmatic member of the government, and the only one who ever learned to deal with Smallwood as an equal."
