= John R. Courage =

Canadian politician (1915-1970)

The Honourable John R. Courage MHA
- Courage in 1961

28th Speaker of the Newfoundland House of Assembly
- In office 1957–1962
- Preceded by: Reginald F. Sparkes
- Succeeded by: George W. Clarke

Member of the Newfoundland House of Assembly for Fortune Bay and Hermitage
- In office May 27, 1949 – November 19, 1962
- Preceded by: Harris M. Mosdell (pre-Confederation)
- Succeeded by: H.R.V. Earle (as MHA for Fortune Bay); John T. Cheeseman (as MHA for Hermitage)

Personal details
- Born: March 15, 1915 Long Harbour Beach, Newfoundland
- Died: May 20, 1970 (aged 55)
- Party: Liberal
- Spouse: Mary Keeping
- Children: 2 sons
- Education: Memorial University
- Occupation: Teacher, lawyer

John Rowland Courage (March 15, 1915 – May 20, 1970) was an educator, lawyer and political figure in Newfoundland. He represented Fortune Bay and Hermitage in the Newfoundland and Labrador House of Assembly from 1949 to 1962 as a Liberal.

The son of George R. and Jane Courage, he was born in Long Harbour Beach, Fortune Bay and educated in North Sydney, Nova Scotia, in Pass Islands and at Memorial University. Courage taught school from 1931 to 1945. In 1945, he was named principal of the Adult Education Centre. Courage was called to the Newfoundland bar in 1953. He served as speaker for the House of Assembly from 1957 until 1962, when he resigned his seat to become chairman of the Newfoundland Civil Service Commission.

Courage married Mary Keeping; the couple had two sons.
