= Patrick Canning =

Canadian educator, businessman and politician

Pat Canning

MHA for Burin-Placentia West
- In office 1975–1979
- Preceded by: Leo Barry
- Succeeded by: Don Hollett
- In office 1949–1972
- Succeeded by: Leo Barry

Personal details
- Born: March 17, 1915 Merasheen, Newfoundland
- Died: 1991 (aged 75–76) Newfoundland and Labrador
- Party: Liberal Party of Newfoundland and Labrador

Patrick Joseph Canning (March 17, 1915 – 1991) was a Canadian educator, business owner and politician in Newfoundland. He represented the electoral district of Burin-Placentia West in the Newfoundland and Labrador House of Assembly from 1949 to 1972 and 1975 to 1979. He was a member of the Liberal Party of Newfoundland and Labrador.

The son of Bernard Canning and Elizabeth Pomroy, he was born in 1915 in Merasheen and was educated there and at Memorial University College. Canning joined the Royal Navy in 1940 and saw service in the North Atlantic and Mediterranean during World War II. After the war, he taught school for several years and then was employed as manager for James Baird Ltd. in Marystown from 1949 to 1951. In 1951, he set up his own business Central Stores there. Canning also served as president of the Newfoundland and Labrador Truckers' Association.

He married Helen Fleming; the couple had two daughters.

Canning was first elected to the Newfoundland assembly in 1949 and then was reelected in 1952, 1956, 1959, 1962, 1966 and 1971. He was defeated when he ran for reelection in 1972 but was reelected in 1975, defeating cabinet minister Leo Barry. Canning retired from politics in 1979 and died in 1991.
