= St. Barbe (electoral district) =

Former provincial electoral district in Newfoundland and Labrador, Canada

Newfoundland and Labrador electoral district
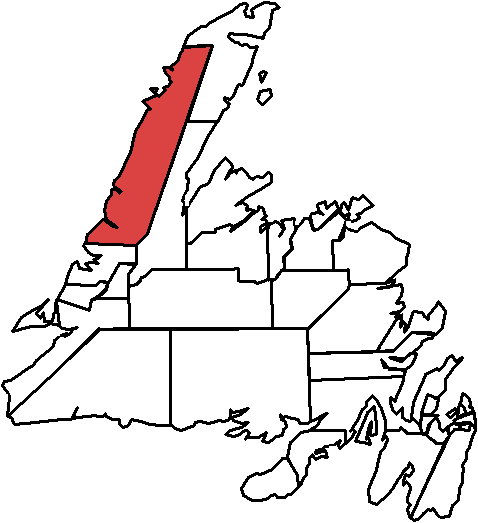
- St. Barbe in relation to other districts in Newfoundland

Defunct provincial electoral district
- Legislature: Newfoundland and Labrador House of Assembly
- District created: 1975
- First contested: 1975
- Last contested: 2011

Demographics
- Population (2006): 10,018
- Electors (2011): 7,064

St. Barbe is a defunct provincial electoral district for the House of Assembly of Newfoundland and Labrador, Canada. In 2011, there were 7,064 eligible voters living within the district. The district was abolished in 2015 and replaced by St. Barbe-L'Anse aux Meadows.

An area along the west coast of the Great Northern Peninsula, the district has significant economic disparity among various communities. While most of the towns with Gros Morne National Park, and the town of Port Saunders, which is a government service centre have fared very well economically, other towns such as Bird Cove have lost more than 50% of their population since the 1992 cod moratorium.

The tourist season runs from late May until late October. While the principal tourism driver is Gros Morne National Park, the season continues into late October as this is a popular big game hunting destination for primarily US hunters. Up to a dozen big game outfitters operate from the area employing hundreds of guides, cooks, and others. The area has fish processing plants in Woody Point, Rocky Harbour, Cow Head, River of Ponds, Port au Choix, New Ferrole and Black Duck Cove. Various species including shrimp, turbot and crab are processed locally, while many other species such as lobster, herring, mackerel and halibut are shipped out with little to no processing done.

It included the communities of St. Barbe, Bartlett's Harbour, Bellburns, Bird Cove, Black Duck Cove, Blue Cove, Brig Bay, Castor River North, Castor River South, Cow Head, Daniel's Harbour, Eddie's Cove West, Forrester's Point, Glenburnie-Birchy Head-Shoal Brook, Hawke's Bay, New Ferrole, Norris Point, Parsons Pond, Pigeon Cove, Plum Point, Pond Cove, Port aux Choix, Port Saunders, Portland Creek, Reef's Harbour, River of Ponds, Rocky Harbour St. Pauls, Sally's Cove, Shoal Cove West, Three Mile Rock, Trout River, Wiltondale, and Woody Point.

== Members of the House of Assembly ==
Member	Party	Term
Jim Bennett	Liberal	2011–2015
Wallace Young	Progressive Conservative	2001–2011
Chuck Furey	Liberal	1985–2000
Everett Osmond	Progressive Conservative	1982–1985
Trevor Bennett	Liberal	1979–1982
Ed Maynard	Progressive Conservative	1975–1979
James R. Chalker	Liberal	1956–1962
Reginald Sparkes	Liberal	1949–1956

=== St. Barbe North ===
Member	Party	Term
Frederick B. Rowe	Liberal	1972–1975
James R. Chalker	Liberal	1962–1972

=== St. Barbe South ===
Member	Party	Term
Edward Maynard	Progressive Conservative	1971–1975
Gerald Myrden	Liberal	1966–1971
William Smith	Progressive Conservative	1962–1966

== Election results ==
2011 Newfoundland and Labrador general election
Party	Candidate	Votes	%	±%
Liberal	Jim Bennett	1815	45.05%	
Progressive Conservative	Wallace Young	1779	44.11%	–
NDP	Diane Ryan	437	10.84%	

2007 Newfoundland and Labrador general election
Party	Candidate	Votes	%	±%
Progressive Conservative	Wallace Young	2491	58.65%	–
Liberal	Jim Bennett	1560	36.73%	
NDP	B. Gary Noel	196	4.62%	

2003 Newfoundland and Labrador general election
Party	Candidate	Votes	%	±%
Progressive Conservative	Wallace Young	2948	61.19	–
Liberal	Ralph Payne	1577	32.73	
NDP	Holly Patey	293	6.08	

== See also ==
- List of Newfoundland and Labrador provincial electoral districts
- Canadian provincial electoral districts
