= James Chalker =

Canadian politician and businessman

MHA for Harbour Grace
- In office 1949–1956
- Succeeded by: Claude Sheppard

MHA for St. Barbe North
- In office 1956–1972
- Succeeded by: Frederick B. Rowe

Personal details
- Born: October 12, 1912 St. John's, Dominion of Newfoundland
- Died: August 17, 2003 (aged 90) St. John's, Newfoundland and Labrador
- Party: Liberal Party of Newfoundland and Labrador
- Occupation: businessman

James Ronald Chalker (October 12, 1912 – August 17, 2003) was a Canadian politician and businessperson. He represented the electoral districts of Harbour Grace and St. Barbe North in the Newfoundland and Labrador House of Assembly from 1949 to 1972. He was a member of the Liberal Party of Newfoundland and Labrador.

The son of James Chalker and Mary Byrne, he was born at St. John's in 1912 and was educated at Bishop Feild College and St. Andrew's College in Aurora, Ontario. In 1937, he married Margaret L. Butt. Before being elected to the Newfoundland assembly in 1949, Chalker was managing director of Chalker and Co. Ltd. and Newfoundland Lime Ltd. He served in Joey Smallwood's cabinet for 22 years, serving as Minister of Education, Minister of Economic Development, Minister of Public Works and Minister of Provincial Affairs. At the time of his death in 2003, Chalker was the last surviving former Smallwood Cabinet member.

The east block of the Confederation Building, the Arts and Culture Centres in St. John's and Corner Brook, the College of Trades and Technology and Memorial University were built during Chalker's tenure as public works minister.
