= Frederick William Rowe =

Canadian politician (1912–1994)

The Honourable Frederick W. Rowe

Senator from Lewisporte, Newfoundland
- In office December 9, 1971 – September 28, 1987
- Nominated by: Pierre Trudeau
- Appointed by: Ewart Harnum

Member of the Newfoundland House of Assembly for Grand Falls
- In office September 8, 1966 – October 28, 1971
- Preceded by: Ambrose Peddle
- Succeeded by: Aubrey Senior

Member of the Newfoundland House of Assembly for White Bay South
- In office October 2, 1956 – September 8, 1966
- Preceded by: Sam Drover (as MHA for White Bay)
- Succeeded by: Bill Rowe

Member of the Newfoundland House of Assembly for Labrador
- In office November 26, 1951 – October 2, 1956
- Preceded by: Harold Horwood
- Succeeded by: Earl Winsor

Personal details
- Born: Frederick William Rowe; September 28, 1912 Lewisporte, Newfoundland
- Died: June 20, 1994 (aged 81) St. John's, Newfoundland, Canada
- Party: Liberal
- Spouse: Edith Laura Butt (m. 1936)
- Children: 4 sons, including Frederick B. Rowe and Bill Rowe
- Education: Memorial University; Mount Allison University; University of Toronto
- Occupation: Teacher

Frederick William Rowe (September 28, 1912 – June 20, 1994) was a Newfoundlander and Canadian politician. After serving in the Newfoundland House of Assembly for 20 years, he was appointed to the Canadian Senate.

== Biography ==
He was born in Lewisporte, Dominion of Newfoundland, the youngest son of Eli Rowe and Phoebe Ann Freake. He attended school at Lewisporte Methodist School, continuing his education at Prince of Wales College and the Normal Training School of Newfoundland in St. John's. In 1934, he enrolled in Memorial University College and graduated in 1936 with first class honours. After graduating, he became a teacher in Bishop's Falls and then in Bonne Bay, where he met his future wife, Edith Laura Butt. Rowe married her on December 25, 1936. They had four sons: Frederick, Stanley, William, and George.

Rowe also taught in Lewisporte and Wesleyville, Newfoundland and Labrador before attending Mount Allison University in Sackville, New Brunswick, where he received a Bachelor of Arts degree and the O. E. Smith Scholarship in 1941.

In 1948, Rowe left Newfoundland for additional post-secondary training, attending the University of Toronto to study for a Bachelor of Paedagogy, which he received in 1949. While in Toronto he appeared on CBC Radio a number of times, commenting on Newfoundland life and culture.

He returned to Newfoundland late in 1949 and spent the next two years working part-time on a doctorate in Paedagogy, which he was granted by the University of Toronto in 1951. During that time, Rowe was a civil servant, working as the first Deputy Minister of Welfare in the new provincial government under the leadership of Joseph R. Smallwood. From 1950 to 1952 he served on the first Board of Regents for Memorial University. He also served on the United Church Board of Education from 1951 to 1956.

In 1951, he decided to give up his job and get involved in elected politics. A general election was called for that November, but bad weather caused the polling to be delayed until the following August. Rowe was the only candidate running for the Labrador seat and was elected to the Newfoundland and Labrador House of Assembly by acclamation. Smallwood made him the Minister of Mines and Resources, a portfolio he would hold until 1956. From 1956 to 1966, he represented the riding of White Bay South and from 1966 to 1971, the riding of Grand Falls. He was defeated in the 1971 general election.

While he was involved in provincial politics, Rowe held many cabinet positions: Public Welfare (1955–1956), Education (1956–1959), Highways (1959–1964), Finance (1964–1967), Community and Social Development (1966–1967), Education (1967–1971), and Labrador Affairs (1967–1971). In 1969, he became the first Deputy Premier of Newfoundland.

Smallwood announced his intention to retire and asked the Liberals to choose a new leader. The leadership convention was scheduled for October 1969. In January, Rowe announced that he would run for the job. He had competition from John Crosbie, who had left the Party after arguing with Smallwood the previous year over funding for the Come By Chance Refinery project. By mid-July 1969, Smallwood entered the leadership race. Rumours at the time speculated that it was a move to stop Crosbie from winning. Rowe immediately withdrew his name and pledged his support to Smallwood, who went on to win the leadership. He remained as Premier until January 1972.

After losing his bid for re-election in Grand Falls in the 1971 general election, Rowe was appointed to the Senate by Pierre Trudeau. For the next sixteen years, he was a Liberal Senator from Newfoundland. As a Senator, he represented Canada at the Inter-Parliamentary Conferences at Rome, Italy in 1972; at an international event in Colombo, Sri Lanka in 1975; at the Commonwealth Parliamentary Conference in the Bahamas in 1982; in Seoul, South Korea in 1983; and as a member of the official Canadian delegation to the People's Republic of China in 1983.

He retired upon turning 75, the mandatory retirement age for senators.

One of Rowe's greatest contributions to Newfoundland was his research and writing on the province's history, particularly on its history of education. His published books include, The History of Education in Newfoundland (1952); The Challenge of a Changing Canada (1957); The Development of Education in Newfoundland (1964); Education and Culture in Newfoundland (1976); Extinction: The Beothuks of Newfoundland (1977), Newfoundland and its Education System (1978); A History of Newfoundland and Labrador (1980); The Smallwood Era (1985); and his memoirs, Into the Breach: Memoirs of a Newfoundland Senator (1988).

While Minister of Education, he wrote Blueprint for Education in Newfoundland (1958). He also wrote many articles for publications such as The Canadian Encyclopedia, World Book Encyclopedia, and Joseph R. Smallwood's The Book of Newfoundland.

Rowe died in St. John's at the age of 81.

His son, Bill Rowe, followed in his father's footsteps, becoming a writer and a cabinet minister. His son Frederick B. Rowe also served in the Newfoundland assembly.
