= Augustine Duffy =

Canadian politician

Augustine Michael Duffy (February 18, 1905 – July 26, 1966) was a businessman and politician in Newfoundland, Canada. He represented Ferryland from 1951 to 1952 and St. John's Centre from 1956 to 1962 in the Newfoundland House of Assembly. His first name also appears as Augustus in some sources.

The son of Michael A. Duffy and Mary J. Lawlor, he was born in St. John's in 1905 and was educated at Saint Bonaventure's College. Duffy married his first wife, Ethel Oliphant, around 1930; the couple had two daughters, Geraldine Mary (b.1932) and Joan Bernadette (b.1933). Ethel died from tuberculosis in 1935 and he married Elizabeth M. Morrisey in 1938; there were no children from his second marriage. He was managing director of A.M. Duffy Ltd. and of The Colonial Stationery Ltd.

He was first elected to the Newfoundland assembly in 1951 as a Progressive Conservative. The results of the election were overturned due to voting irregularities and Duffy was defeated in the by-election that followed. He was elected again in 1956 but, in 1959, he left the Conservative party and joined the United Newfoundland Party. Duffy was co-founder of the party with John R. O'Dea. He was defeated when he ran for re-election in 1962.
