= 37th General Assembly of Newfoundland =

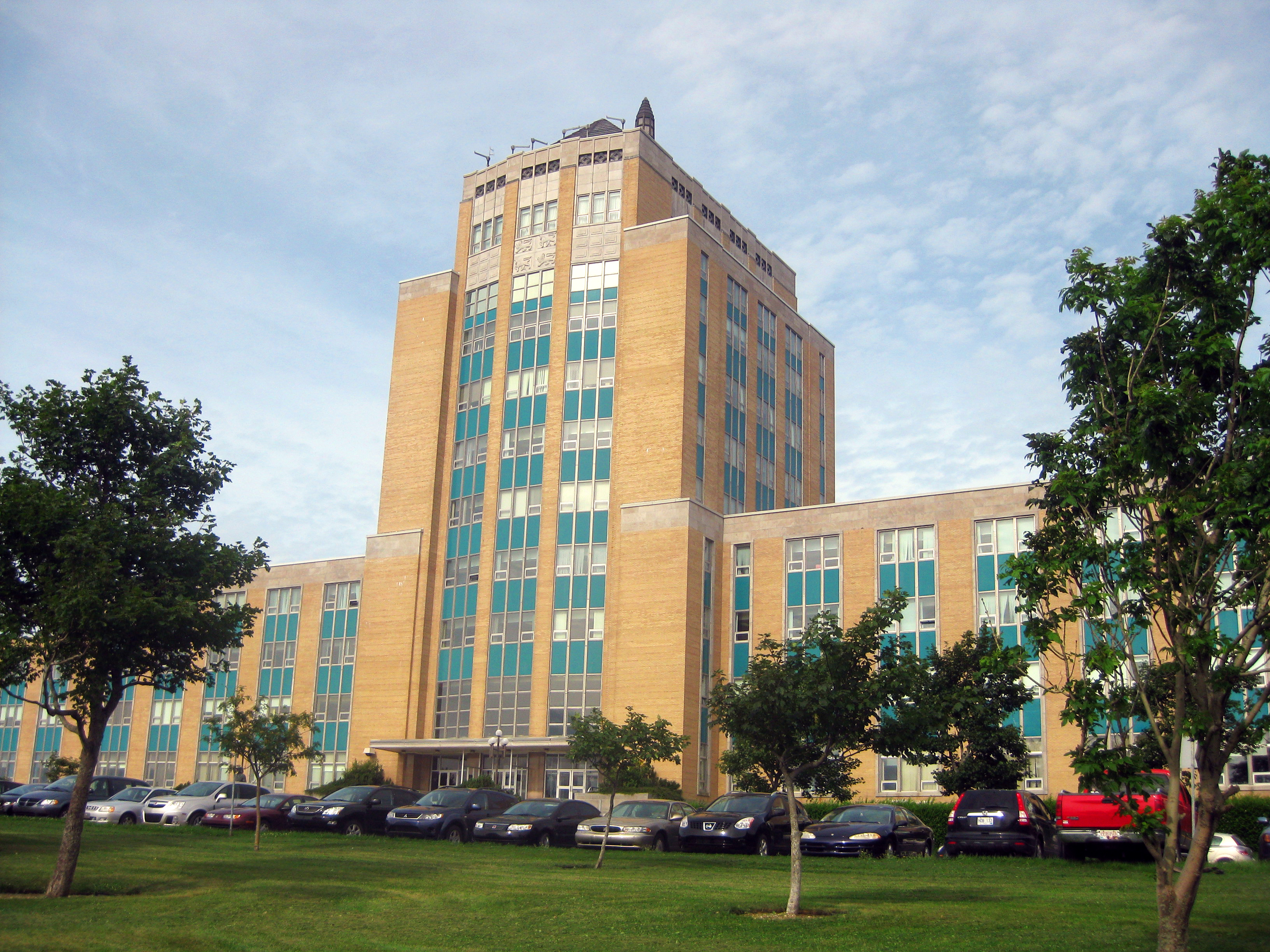
- Confederation Building East Block. Seat of the Newfoundland and Labrador government and the House of Assembly from 1960 to present.

History
- Founded: November 19, 1975
- Disbanded: May 25, 1979
- Preceded by: 36th General Assembly of Newfoundland
- Succeeded by: 38th General Assembly of Newfoundland

Leadership
- Premier: Frank Moores

Elections
- Last election: 1975 Newfoundland general election

The members of the 37th General Assembly of Newfoundland were elected in the Newfoundland general election held in September 1975. The general assembly sat from November 19, 1975 to May 25, 1979.

The Progressive Conservative Party led by Frank Moores formed the government.

Gerald Ottenheimer served as speaker.

There were four sessions of the 37th General Assembly:

Session	Start	End
1st	November 19, 1975	November 18, 1976
2nd	February 2, 1977	November 24, 1977
3rd	March 6, 1978	November 21, 1978
4th	December 4, 1978	May 25, 1979

Gordon Arnaud Winter served as lieutenant governor of Newfoundland.

== Members of the Assembly ==
The following members were elected to the assembly in 1975:

Member	Electoral district	Party	First elected / previously elected
Thomas G. Rideout	Baie Verte-White Bay	Liberal	1975
Luke Woodrow	Bay of Islands	Progressive Conservative	1975
Wilson E. Callan	Bellevue	Liberal Reform	1975
Wilson E. Callan	Bellevue	Liberal	1975
W. George Cross	Bonavista North	Progressive Conservative	1975
James C. Morgan	Bonavista South	Progressive Conservative	1972
Roger Simmons	Burgeo-Bay d'Espoir	Liberal	1973
Patrick J. Canning	Burin-Placentia West	Liberal	1949, 1975
Rod Moores	Carbonear	Liberal Reform	1975
John A. Nolan	Conception Bay South	Liberal	1966, (Note: St. John's South) 1975
Ian Strachan	Eagle River	Liberal	1975
Stephen J. Mulrooney	Exploits	Liberal	1975
Hugh Twomey (1976)	Exploits	Progressive Conservative	1976
Charlie Power	Ferryland	Progressive Conservative	1975
Martin O'Brien (1976)	Ferryland	Liberal	1976
Charlie Power (1977)	Ferryland	Progressive Conservative	1975, 1977
Earl S. Winsor	Fogo	Liberal	1956
C. Jack Winsor	Fortune-Hermitage	Liberal	1975
Harold A. Collins	Gander	Progressive Conservative	1967
T. Alexander Hickman	Grand Bank	Progressive Conservative	1966 (Note: First Elected as a Liberal)
John Lundrigan	Grand Falls	Progressive Conservative	1975
A. Brian Peckford	Green Bay	Progressive Conservative	1972
Haig Young	Harbour Grace	Progressive Conservative	1972
William Doody	Harbour Main-Bell Island	Progressive Conservative	1971
Thomas C. Farrell	Humber East	Progressive Conservative	1971
Wallace House	Humber Valley	Progressive Conservative	1975
Frank D. Moores	Humber West	Progressive Conservative	1971
Robert Wells	Kilbride	Progressive Conservative	1972
Stephen A. Neary	La Poile	Independent Liberal	1962
Stephen A. Neary	La Poile	Liberal	1962
Freeman White	Lewisporte	Liberal	1975
Joseph G. Rousseau	Menihek	Progressive Conservative	1972
Neil Windsor	Mount Pearl	Progressive Conservative	1975
Ray Winsor	Mount Scio	Progressive Conservative	1975
Joseph Goudie	Naskaupi	Progressive Conservative	1975
William G. Patterson	Placentia	Progressive Conservative	1975
Jerome Dinn	Pleasantville	Progressive Conservative	1975
James Hodder	Port au Port	Liberal	1975
Eric N. Dawe	Port de Grave	Liberal Reform	1962, 1975
Edward Maynard	St. Barbe	Progressive Conservative	1971
Hazel McIsaac	St. George's	Liberal	1975
Anthony J. Murphy	St. John's Centre	Progressive Conservative	1962
William Marshall	St. John's East	Progressive Conservative	1970
Thomas V. Hickey	St. John's East Extern	Progressive Conservative	1966
John A. Carter	St. John's North	Progressive Conservative	1971
John Collins	St. John's South	Progressive Conservative	1975
John C. Crosbie	St. John's West	Progressive Conservative	1966
Hubert Kitchen (1977)	St. John's West	Liberal	1971, (Note: Harbour Grace) 1977
Walter C. Carter	St. Mary's-The Capes	Progressive Conservative	1962, (Note: White Bay North (First Elected as a Liberal)) 1975
William J. MacNeil	Stephenville	Liberal	1975
Edward Roberts	Strait of Belle Isle	Liberal	1966
Thomas Lush	Terra Nova	Liberal	1975
Frederick B. Rowe	Trinity-Bay de Verde	Liberal	1972
Charles Brett	Trinity North	Progressive Conservative	1972
Joseph R. Smallwood	Twillingate	Liberal Reform	1949, (Note: Bonavista North/ St. John's West/Humber West/Placentia East (First Elected as a Liberal)) 1975
William N. Rowe (1977)	Twillingate	Liberal	1966, (Note: White Bay South) 1977
Gerry Ottenheimer	Waterford-Kenmount	Progressive Conservative	1966, (Note: St. John's East) 1971
Graham Flight	Windsor-Buchans	Liberal	1975

== By-elections ==
By-elections were held to replace members for various reasons:

Electoral district	Member elected	Affiliation	Election date	Reason
Bonavista North	W. George Cross	Progressive Conservative	June 30, 1976	Results of election overturned
Exploits	Hugh Twomey	Progressive Conservative	June 30, 1976	Results of election overturned
Ferryland	Martin O'Brien	Liberal	June 30, 1976	Results of election overturned
Ferryland	Charlie Power	Progressive Conservative	June 16, 1977	Results of 1976 by-election overturned
St. John's West	Hubert Kitchen	Liberal	June 16, 1977	JC Crosbie entered federal politics
Twillingate	William N. Rowe	Liberal	December 8, 1977	JR Smallwood resigned seat
