= 1975 Newfoundland general election =

Canadian provincial election

- September 16, 1975

51 seats to the 37th General Assembly of Newfoundland 26 seats needed for a majority
- Turnout: 72.8% (▼6.2% pp)
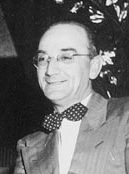
	First party	Second party	Third party
	PC	LIB
Leader	Frank Moores	Edward Roberts	Joey Smallwood
Party	Progressive Conservative	Liberal	Reform Liberal
Leader since	1972	1972	1975
Leader's seat	Humber West	Strait of Belle Isle	Twillingate (Note: Not the incumbent, but stood in this seat and won)
Last election	33 seats, 60.22%	9 seats, 37.06%	New party
Seats won	30	16	4
Seat change	▼3	▲7	▲4
Popular vote	101,016	82,270	26,552
Percentage	45.54%	37.09%	11.96%
Swing	▼14.68pp	▲0.03pp	n/a
Premier before election
Frank Moores
Progressive Conservative
Premier after election
Frank Moores
Progressive Conservative

The 1975 Newfoundland general election was held on 16 September 1975 to elect members of the 37th General Assembly of Newfoundland. It was won by the Progressive Conservative party.

== Results ==
Party	Leader	1972	Seats won	% change	Popular vote	(%)
Progressive Conservative	Frank Moores	33	30	-9.1%	101,016	45.54
Liberal	Ed Roberts	9	16	+56%	82,270	37.09
Reform Liberal	Joey Smallwood	-	4	N/A	26,522	11.96
New Democratic	Gerry Panting	-	-	0%	9,653	4.35
Other (Independent Liberal)		-	*1	0%	2,357	1.06
Totals		42	51	-	222,789	100.00

== Results by district ==
- Names in **boldface type** represent party leaders.
- † indicates that the incumbent did not run again.
- ₰ indicates that the incumbent ran in another district and lost the nomination.
- ‡ indicates that the incumbent ran in a different district.

=== St. John's ===
Electoral district	Candidates				Incumbent
Electoral district	PC	Liberal	Reform Liberal	NDP	Incumbent
Kilbride; 72.56% turnout	Robert Wells; 2,939; 62.71%	Ern Antle; 1,037; 22.12%	Hugh Shea; 711; 15.17%		New district
Pleasantville; 75.76% turnout	Jerome Dinn; 2,903; 46.33%	Maxwell Dyke; 1,125; 17.95%	David Owens; 479; 7.65%	**Gerry Panting**; 1,759; 28.07%	New district
St. John's Centre; 66.08% turnout	Anthony Murphy; 2,366; 59.58%	William Doyle; 956; 24.08%	John Coyle; 649; 16.34%		Anthony Murphy
St. John's East; 65.30% turnout	William Marshall; 2,032; 55.08%	Brian Clarke; 357; 9.68%	David Gulliver; 721; 19.54%	Robert Griffiths; 579; 15.70%	William Marshall
St. John's North; 72.49% turnout	John Carter; 1,944; 46.13%	Graham Wood; 1,386; 32.89%		Andrew Wells; 884; 20.98%	John Carter
St. John's South; 65.66% turnout	John Collins; 2,221; 66.96%	Gordon Lidstone; 1,096; 33.04%			Robert Wells‡ (ran in Kilbride)
St. John's West; 67.55% turnout	John Crosbie; 2,134; 55.70%	Robert Innes; 1,697; 44.30%			John Crosbie
Waterford-Kenmount; 66.24% turnout	Gerry Ottenheimer; 2,922; 54.29%	Gerald Moore; 1,062; 19.73%	Roy Upshall; 808; 15.02%	Elizabeth Genge; 590; 10.96%	New district

=== St. John's suburbs ===
Electoral district	Candidates				Incumbent
Electoral district	PC	Liberal	Reform Liberal	NDP	Incumbent
Conception Bay South; 79.24% turnout	Gordon Dawe; 3,062; 44.21%	John Nolan; 3,112; 44.93%	Ralph Petten; 467; 6.74%	Wilson Porter; 285; 4.12%	New district
Mount Pearl; 75.20% turnout	Neil Windsor; 1,885; 41.03%	Kell Ashford; 1,513; 32.93%		Helen Porter; 1,196; 26.04%	New district
Mount Scio; 85.10% turnout	Ray Winsor; 2,685; 47.88%	Len Stirling; 1,978; 35.27%		Bill Gillespie; 945; 16.85%	New district
St. John's East Extern; 82.05% turnout	Tom Hickey; 3,318; 65.28%	Michael Laurie; 1,765; 34.72%			Tom Hickey

=== Avalon Peninsula ===
Electoral district	Candidates				Incumbent
Electoral district	PC	Liberal	Reform Liberal	NDP	Incumbent
Carbonear; 79.22% turnout	Fred Earle; 1,919; 36.92%	Walter Milley; 1,194; 22.97%	Rod Moores; 2,085; 40.11%		Augustus Rowe†
Ferryland; 83.47% turnout	Charlie Power; 1,240; 30.48%	Martin O'Brien; 1,232; 30.28%	Kenneth Carew; 918; 22.57%	Kevin Condon; 678; 16.67%	Thomas Doyle‡ (ran in Twillingate)
Harbour Grace; 79.89% turnout	Haig Young; 1,982; 45.79%	Ted Pike; 969; 22.38%	Clarence Engelbrecht (Bob Lewis); 1,378; 31.83%		Haig Young
Harbour Main-Bell Island; 69.24% turnout	William Doody; 2,944; 65.96%	Wilfred Drover; 1,519; 34.04%			Gordon Dawe‡ Harbour Main (ran in Conception Bay South)
Harbour Main-Bell Island; 69.24% turnout	William Doody; 2,944; 65.96%	Wilfred Drover; 1,519; 34.04%			William Doody; Harbour Main
Harbour Main-Bell Island; 69.24% turnout	William Doody; 2,944; 65.96%	Wilfred Drover; 1,519; 34.04%			Merged district
Harbour Main-Bell Island; 69.24% turnout	William Doody; 2,944; 65.96%	Wilfred Drover; 1,519; 34.04%			Steve Neary₰ Bell Island (ran in La Poile)
Placentia; 78.90% turnout	William Patterson; 1,721; 41.40%	Anthony Sparrow; 1,698; 40.85%	Alphonsus Best; 738; 17.75%		Fintan Aylward†; Placentia East
Port de Grave; 74.97% turnout	George Wilson; 1,625; 33.18%	James Hussey; 1,624; 33.15%	Eric Dawe; 1,649; 33.67%		George Wilson
St. Mary's-The Capes; 77.41% turnout	Walter Carter; 2,168; 60.81%	Ted Noseworthy; 264; 7.41%	John Devereaux; 1,133; 31.78%		Gerry Ottenheimer; St. Mary's (ran in Waterford-Kenmount)
Trinity-Bay de Verde; 74.09% turnout	James Reid; 1,536; 37.85%	Frederick B. Rowe; 2,197; 54.14%	Raymond Taylor; 325; 8.01%		Brendan Howard†; Bay de Verde
Trinity-Bay de Verde; 74.09% turnout	James Reid; 1,536; 37.85%	Frederick B. Rowe; 2,197; 54.14%	Raymond Taylor; 325; 8.01%		Merged district
Trinity-Bay de Verde; 74.09% turnout	James Reid; 1,536; 37.85%	Frederick B. Rowe; 2,197; 54.14%	Raymond Taylor; 325; 8.01%		James Reid; Trinity South

=== Eastern Newfoundland ===
Electoral district	Candidates				Incumbent
Electoral district	PC	Liberal	Reform Liberal	Other	Incumbent
Bellevue; 74.42% turnout	Graham Bennett; 1,303; 23.55%	Hubert Kitchen; 2,044; 36.94%	Wilson Callan; 2,186; 39.51%		New district
Bonavista North; 70.07% turnout	George Cross; 1,518; 35.80%	Paul Thoms; 1,511; 35.64%	Samuel King; 1,211; 28.56%		Paul Thoms
Bonavista South; 67.69% turnout	Jim Morgan; 2,326; 62.23%	George Allen; 474; 12.68%	William Smallwood; 938; 25.09%		Jim Morgan
Fogo; 58.14% turnout	Barton Manning; 947; 28.06%	Earl Winsor; 2,428; 71.94%			Earl Winsor
Terra Nova; 68.44% turnout	Samuel Saunders; 1,069; 26.80%	Tom Lush; 2,116; 53.06%	Bill Broderick; 803; 20.14%		New district
Trinity North; 73.04% turnout	Charlie Brett; 2,554; 54.67%	Calvin Lethbridge; 979; 20.95%	Bren Power Jr. 1,073; 22.97%	Edgar Russell (Independent); 66; 1.41%	Charlie Brett

=== Central Newfoundland ===
Electoral district	Candidates				Incumbent
Electoral district	PC	Liberal	Reform Liberal	NDP	Incumbent
Baie Verte-White Bay; 79.86% turnout	Desmond Sullivan; 1,592; 31.35%	Tom Rideout; 2,911; 57.31%	Carl Wright; 576; 11.34%		Bill Rowe†; White Bay South
Exploits; 69.70% turnout (Note: The results were subsequently voided by the Supreme Court of Newfoundland and a by-election was held which was won by Twomey.)	Hugh Twomey; 2,455; 49.91%	Stephen Mulrooney; 2,464; 50.09%			New district
Gander; 76.91% turnout	Harold Collins; 2,462; 57.07%	Averill Baker; 1,852; 42.93%			Harold Collins
Grand Falls; 77.19% turnout	John Lundrigan; 2,126; 70.34%	Mundun Batstone; 1,014; 27.21%		Ernest Duder; 586; 15.73%	Aubrey Senior†
Green Bay; 66.60% turnout	Brian Peckford; 2,639; 70.34%	Corbin Clarke; 1,028; 27.40%		Harold Card; 85; 2.26%	Brian Peckford
Lewisporte; 75.98% turnout	James Russell; 2,214; 43.18%	Freeman White; 2,719; 53.02%	Randolph LeDrew; 195; 3.80%		James Russell
Twillingate; 73.80% turnout	Thomas Doyle; 877; 24.17%	Woodrow Philpott; 1,200; 33.07%	**Joey Smallwood**; 1,467; 40.42%	Roderick Woolridge; 85; 2.34%	Herbert Gillett†
Windsor-Buchans; 75.59% turnout	Walter Critchley; 1,233; 29.32%	Graham Flight; 2,363; 56.18%		Donald Head; 610; 14.50%	New district

=== Southern Newfoundland ===
Electoral district	Candidates				Incumbent
Electoral district	PC	Liberal	Reform Liberal	Other	Incumbent
Burgeo-Bay d'Espoir; 72.00% turnout	Brendan Howard; 770; 23.19%	Roger Simmons; 2,550; 76.81%			Allan Evans; Burgeo-La Poile (ran in La Poile)
Burin-Placentia West; 81.02% turnout	Leo Barry; 2,237; 39.95%	Patrick Canning; 3,363; 60.05%			Leo Barry; Placentia West
Fortune-Hermitage; 66.59% turnout	H.R.V. Earle; 1,219; 34.71%	Jack Winsor; 1,696; 48.29%	William Brown; 597; 17.00%		H.R.V. Earle; Fortune Bay
Fortune-Hermitage; 66.59% turnout	H.R.V. Earle; 1,219; 34.71%	Jack Winsor; 1,696; 48.29%	William Brown; 597; 17.00%		Merged district
Fortune-Hermitage; 66.59% turnout	H.R.V. Earle; 1,219; 34.71%	Jack Winsor; 1,696; 48.29%	William Brown; 597; 17.00%		Roger Simmons‡ Hermitage (ran in Burgeo-Bay d'Espoir)
Grand Bank; 75.07% turnout	Alex Hickman; 2,038; 39.72%	Ted Skakum; 1,912; 37.26%	Robert Field; 1,054; 20.54%	Esther Spracklin (NDP); 127; 2.48%	Alex Hickman; Burin
La Poile; 76.96% turnout	Allan Evans; 1,558; 34.23%	Walter Hodder; 758; 16.66%		Steve Neary (Independent Liberal); 2,185; 48.01%	New district
La Poile; 76.96% turnout	Allan Evans; 1,558; 34.23%	Walter Hodder; 758; 16.66%		Eric Hiscock (Independent); 50; 1.10%	New district

=== Western Newfoundland ===
Electoral district	Candidates				Incumbent
Electoral district	PC	Liberal	Reform Liberal	Other	Incumbent
Bay of Islands; 75.29% turnout	Luke Woodrow; 1,726; 37.71%	David Barter; 1,250; 27.31%	Arthur Vincent; 970; 21.19%	David Hunt (NDP); 631; 13.79%	New district
Humber East; 72.03% turnout	Tom Farrell; 2,595; 58.17%	Clayton Hutchings; 1,866; 41.83%			Tom Farrell
Humber Valley; 69.42% turnout	Wallace House; 2,221; 53.03%	Stanley Parsons; 902; 21.54%	Alex Wiseman; 865; 20.65%	Kenneth Prowse (Independent); 200; 4.78%	New district
Humber West; 78.22% turnout	**Frank Moores**; 2,419; 49.77%	Fred Basha; 927; 19.07%	Geoff Stirling; 1,380; 28.39%	Gordon Mullett (NDP); 135; 2.77%	**Frank Moores**
Port au Port; 80.87% turnout	James Cochrane; 1,543; 43.69%	Jim Hodder; 1,989; 56.31%			Jim Hodder
St. Barbe; 70.35% turnout	Edward Maynard; 2,019; 50.96%	Wilson Brown; 1,943; 49.04%			Frederick B. Rowe‡ St. Barbe North (ran in Trinity-Bay de Verde)
St. Barbe; 70.35% turnout	Edward Maynard; 2,019; 50.96%	Wilson Brown; 1,943; 49.04%			Merged district
St. Barbe; 70.35% turnout	Edward Maynard; 2,019; 50.96%	Wilson Brown; 1,943; 49.04%			Edward Maynard; St. Barbe South
St. George's; 76.85% turnout	Alexander Dunphy; 1,990; 48.15%	Hazel McIsaac; 2,143; 51.85%			Alexander Dunphy
Stephenville; 71.65% turnout	Wayne Morrison; 1,823; 46.32%	William MacNeil; 2,113; 53.68%			New district
Strait of Belle Isle; 67.45% turnout	Marlene Maynard; 982; 21.71%	**Edward Roberts**; 2,819; 62.33%	Cyril Humber; 568; 12.56%	Raymond Elliott (NDP); 154; 3.40%	**Edward Roberts**; White Bay North

=== Labrador ===
Electoral district	Candidates				Incumbent
Electoral district	PC	Liberal	Reform Liberal	NDP	Incumbent
Eagle River; 66.58% turnout	Winston White; 585; 37.82%	Ian Strachan; 962; 62.18%			Vacant (Note: Michael Martin had been elected in 1972, but he had resigned from office on May 5, 1975.); Labrador South
Menihek; 50.39% turnout	Joseph Rousseau; 2,561; 65.00%	Eric Chaulk; 621; 15.76%	Eugene Canning; 434; 11.02%	William Smeaton; 324; 8.22%	Joseph Rousseau; Labrador West
Naskaupi; 62.86% turnout	Joseph Goudie; 1,869; 54.32%	Melvin Woodward; 1,572; 45.68%			Melvin Woodward; Labrador North
