= Newfoundland and Labrador Route 350 =

Highway in Newfoundland and Labrador, Canada

Coordinates: 49.3460°N 55.4199°W

Route 350
- Botwood Highway

Route information
- Maintained by Newfoundland and Labrador Department of Transportation and Infrastructure
- Length: 70.7 km (43.9 mi)

Major junctions
- South end: Route 1 (TCH) in Bishop's Falls
- Route 352 in Northern Arm
- North end: Leading Tickles

Location
- Country: Canada
- Province: Newfoundland and Labrador

Highway system
- Highways in Newfoundland and Labrador
← Route 346	→ Route 351

Route 350, commonly known as Botwood Highway, is a side highway in Central Newfoundland that leads from the Trans-Canada Highway (Route 1) in Bishop's Falls to Botwood, Point Leamington and Leading Tickles. It is 70.7 kilometres (43.9 mi) in length and contains several side roads to communities located off the route, such as Peterview, and Route 352 that leads to Point of Bay and the Cottrell's Cove-Fortune Harbour area. Route 350-17 branches off in Point Leamington and connects the small community of Pleasantview to the main route. Route 350 continues on from Point Leamington for another 25 km north to Leading Tickles where the road officially ends. Along the way there is another short road connecting Glovers Harbour to the main route as well.

== Route description ==
Route 350 begins in Bishop's Falls at an interchange with Route 1 (Trans-Canada Highway, Exit 22) just north of downtown. It heads northeast, paralleling the Exploits River, to pass through some neighbourhoods before leaving Bishop's Falls and passing through rural areas for several kilometres, where the road passes by the Exploits Valley (Botwood) Airport (Signed as Centra Newfoundland Airstrip). The highway begins following the coastline of the Bay of Exploits as it passes through Botwood, where it meets a local road leading to Peterview, and Northern Arm, where it makes a left turn at an intersection with Route 352 (Fortune Harbour Road). Route 350 now heads north through inland terrain for several kilometres to Point Leamington, where it meets a local road leading to Pleasantview before winding its through town. The highway winds its way northward through hilly terrain for several kilometres, where it meets a local road leading to Glovers Harbour, before entering Leading Tickles. Route 350 passes through some neighbourhoods before crossing a Causeway onto Cull Island and heading westward through the main part of town. Route 350 now comes to a dead end near the western tip of the island.

== Major intersections ==
Location	km	mi	Destinations	Notes
Bishop's Falls	0.0	0.0	Route 1 (TCH) – Grand Falls-Windsor, Gander	Exit 22 on Route 1; southern terminus; road continues south as Main Street into downtown
	4.6	2.9	Exploits Valley (Botwood) Airport main entrance	Access road into airport; Signed as Centra Newfoundland Airstrip
Botwood	12.6	7.8	Peterview Road (Route 350-13) - Peterview	
Northern Arm	20.8	12.9	Route 352 north (Fortune Harbour Road) – Philips Head, Point of Bay	Southern terminus of Route 352
Point Leamington	39.1	24.3	Pleasantview Road (Route 350-17) - Pleasantview	
	61.2	38.0	Glovers Harbour Road (Route 350-21) - Glovers Harbour	
Leading Tickles	70.7	43.9	Dead End	Northern terminus
1.000 mi = 1.609 km; 1.000 km = 0.621 mi

== See also ==
- List of Newfoundland and Labrador highways
