= Exploits (electoral district) =

Provincial electoral district in Newfoundland and Labrador, Canada

Newfoundland and Labrador electoral district

Provincial electoral district
- Legislature: Newfoundland and Labrador House of Assembly
MHA
Pleaman Forsey
Progressive Conservative
- District created: 1975
- First contested: 1975
- Last contested: 2025

Demographics
- Population (2011): 12,667
- Electors (2015): 9,456
- Area (km²): 3,945
- Pop. density (per km²): 3.2
- Census division(s): Division No. 6, Division No. 8
- Census subdivision(s): Bishop's Falls, Botwood, Grand Falls-Windsor (part), Leading Tickles, Norris Arm, Northern Arm, Peterview, Point Leamington, Point of Bay

Exploits is a provincial electoral district for the House of Assembly of Newfoundland and Labrador, Canada. In central Newfoundland on the Bay of Exploits, it lies between the Trans-Canada Highway in the south and Notre Dame Bay in the north. Most of the population lives in the southern centres of Botwood and Bishop's Falls.

To the north, Exploits includes communities in Notre Dame Bay such as Cottrell's Cove, but most of the population lives in southern centres such as Botwood and Bishop's Falls. Communities include: Bishop's Falls, Bishop's Falls South, Botwood, Charles Brook, Cottrell's Cove, Fortune Harbour, Glovers Harbour, Leading Tickles West, Moore's Cove, Northern Arm, Peterview, Phillip's Head, Pleasantview, Point Leamington, Point of Bay, Ritter's Arm, and Wooddale.

The district was formerly represented by Liberal Premier Roger Grimes.

== Members of the House of Assembly ==
The district has elected the following members of the House of Assembly:

Assembly	Years	Member	Party
37th	1975–1976	Stephen Mulrooney	Liberal
37th	1976–1979	Hugh Twomey	Progressive Conservative
38th	1979–1982	Hugh Twomey	Progressive Conservative
39th	1982–1985	Hugh Twomey	Progressive Conservative
40th	1985–1989	Hugh Twomey	Progressive Conservative
41st	1989–1993	Roger Grimes	Liberal
42nd	1993–1996	Roger Grimes	Liberal
43rd	1996–1999	Roger Grimes	Liberal
44th	1999–2003	Roger Grimes	Liberal
45th	2003–2005	Roger Grimes	Liberal
45th	2005–2007	Clayton Forsey	Progressive Conservative
46th	2007–2011	Clayton Forsey	Progressive Conservative
47th	2011–2015	Clayton Forsey	Progressive Conservative
48th	2015–2019	Jerry Dean	Liberal
49th	2019–2021	Pleaman Forsey	Progressive Conservative
50th	2021–2025	Pleaman Forsey	Progressive Conservative
51st	2025–Present	Pleaman Forsey	Progressive Conservative

== Election results ==
Graph of election results (minor parties that never got 2% of the vote or did not run consistently are omitted) View source data.

2025 Newfoundland and Labrador general election
Party	Candidate	Votes	%	±%
Progressive Conservative	Pleaman Forsey	3,406	61.0%	+6.20
Liberal	Fabian Power	2,019	36.2%	-9.18
New Democratic	Dawn Lahey	160	2.9%	-
Total valid votes		5,585		
Total rejected ballots				
Turnout				
Eligible voters				
Progressive Conservative hold		Swing		+

2021 Newfoundland and Labrador general election
Party	Candidate	Votes	%	±%
Progressive Conservative	Pleaman Forsey	2,641	54.80	+5.36
Liberal	Rodney Mercer	2,178	45.20	+12.10
Total valid votes		4,819	99.05	
Total rejected ballots		46	0.95	
Turnout		4,865	51.50	
Eligible voters		9,447		
Progressive Conservative hold		Swing		-3.37
Source(s) "Officially Nominated Candidates General Election 2021" (PDF). Elections Newfoundland and Labrador. "NL Election 2021 Report" (PDF).

2019 Newfoundland and Labrador general election
Party	Candidate	Votes	%	±%
Progressive Conservative	Pleaman Forsey	2,874	49.44	+2.40
Liberal	Jerry Dean	1,924	33.10	-17.06
Independent	Gloria Cooper	1,015	17.46	-
Total valid votes		5,813	99.71	
Total rejected ballots		17	0.29	-0.12
Turnout		5,830	64.67	+8.48
Eligible voters		9,015		
Progressive Conservative gain from Liberal		Swing		+9.73

2015 Newfoundland and Labrador general election
Party	Candidate	Votes	%	±%
Liberal	Jerry Dean	2,654	50.16%	+34.22
Progressive Conservative	Clayton Forsey	2,489	47.04%	-21.68
New Democratic	Bridget Henley	148	2.80%	-12.53
Total valid votes		5,291	100%	

2011 Newfoundland and Labrador general election
Party	Candidate	Votes	%	±%
Progressive Conservative	Clayton Forsey	2,819	68.72%	-3.67
Liberal	Jim Samson	654	15.94%	-11.67
New Democratic	Grant Hameon	629	15.33%	
Total valid votes		4,102	100%	

2007 Newfoundland and Labrador general election
Party	Candidate	Votes	%	±%
Progressive Conservative	Clayton Forsey	3,396	72.39%	–
Liberal	Jody Fancey	1,295	27.61%	

By-election: June 23, 2005 On resignation of Roger Grimes
Party	Candidate	Votes	%	±%
PC	Clayton Forsey	2,605	55.2	
Liberal	George Saunders	1,958	41.5	
NDP	John Whelan	159	3.4	
Total		4,722	100%	

2003 Newfoundland and Labrador general election
Party	Candidate	Votes	%	±%
Liberal	Roger Grimes	3,218	56.14%	
Progressive Conservative	Clayton Forsey	2,346	40.93%	–
NDP	John Whelan	168	2.93%	

1999 Newfoundland and Labrador general election
Party	Candidate	Votes	%	±%
Liberal	Roger Grimes	2,526		
Progressive Conservative	Gonzo Gillingham	1,944	–	–
NDP	Arnold Best	633		

== See also ==
- List of Newfoundland and Labrador provincial electoral districts
- Canadian provincial electoral districts
