= Newfoundland and Labrador Route 352 =

Canadian highway

Route 352
- Fortune Harbour Road

Route information
- Maintained by Newfoundland and Labrador Department of Transportation and Infrastructure
- Length: 53.1 km (33.0 mi)

Major junctions
- South end: Route 350 in Northern Arm
- North end: Fortune Harbour

Location
- Country: Canada
- Province: Newfoundland and Labrador

Highway system
- Highways in Newfoundland and Labrador
← Route 351	→ Route 360

Route 352, also known as Fortune Harbour Road, is a 53.1-kilometre-long (33.0 mi) north-south highway on the northern coast of Newfoundland in the Canadian province of Newfoundland and Labrador. It connects the town of Northern Arm, at an intersection with Route 350 (Botwood Highway), with the community of Fortune Harbour, along with several other communities in between.

== Route description ==
Route 352 begins in Northern Arm at an intersection with Route 350 (Botwood Highway). It heads northeast through neighbourhoods to leave town and pass along the coastline of the Bay of Exploits to pass through Philips Head, Point of Bay, and Charles Brook. The highway now winds its way northward up a peninsula for several kilometres to pass Cottrell's Cove, where it has an intersection with a local road leading to Moore's Cove. Route 352 winds its way through more rural terrain to enter Fortune Harbour, where it comes to a dead end after passing through the town.

== Major intersections ==
Location	km	mi	Destinations	Notes
Northern Arm	0.0	0.0	Route 350 (Botwood Highway) to Route 1 (TCH) – Botwood, Point Leamington, Leading Tickles	Southern terminus
Cottrell's Cove	45.6	28.3	Moore's Cove Road - Moore's Cove	
Fortune Harbour	53.1	33.0	Dead End	Northern terminus
1.000 mi = 1.609 km; 1.000 km = 0.621 mi
