= Touton =

Newfoundland pancake

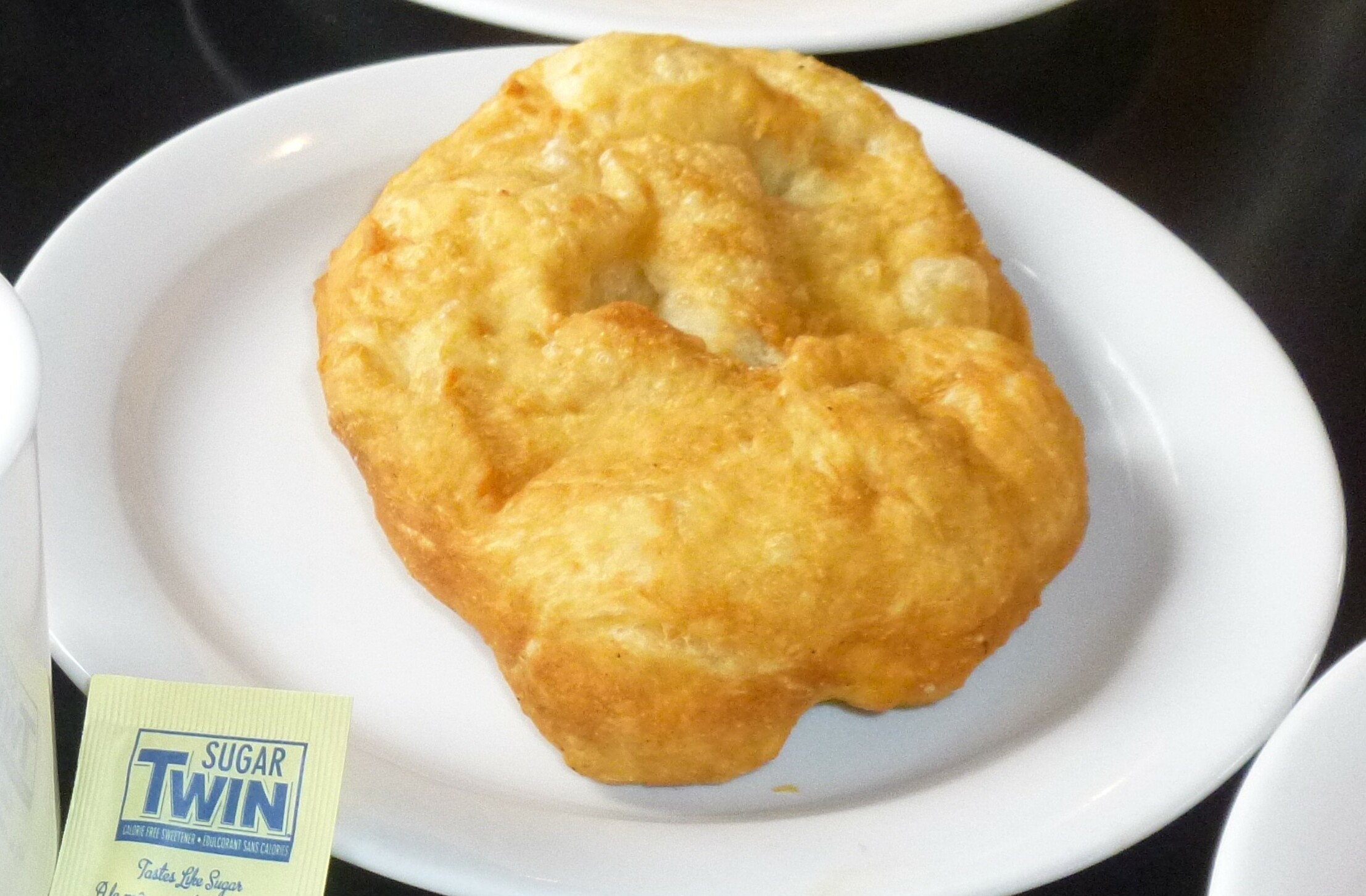
- Alternative names: Tiffin, touton, touten, towtent, damper dogs, damper devils
- Type: Fried bread dough
- Place of origin: Canada
- Region or state: Newfoundland
- Main ingredients: Bread dough, butter or pork fat

Touton, pronounced /ˈtaʊtən/, toutin, tiffin, touten or towtent is a traditional dish from Newfoundland, made with risen bread dough. The dish has a long list of regionally-distinct names, and can refer to two (or more) different types of baked or fried dough: the dough cake variant, usually fried; and a baked bun variant, made with pork fat. Toutons are usually served at breakfast or brunch and are on the breakfast menus of many local restaurants.

== Variants ==
=== Fried bread dough ===
The most widely accepted definition of a touton refers to the dish produced by frying bread dough on a pan in butter or pork fat. Toutons are often made from leftover bread dough, or dough that was left to rise overnight, such as this description from North River, Conception Bay, 1966:

Risen bread dough pulled flat like a pancake, and fried in pork fat (salt) or margarine. It was usually served for breakfast because with slow rising yeast, bread was mixed in the evening, allowed to rise during the night, and was baked the next day.

They were sometimes a treat for children, who were fed them so they wouldn’t gobble up all the fresh-baked bread. There was no exact recipe for touton/bread dough in outport communities; each maker generally relied on recipes and techniques passed down orally or through observation. Folklorist Andrea McGuire documented this in an interview with Mary (Murphy) King, originally of Ship Cove, Placentia Bay, who spoke of her mother's interactions with American servicemen in the mid twentieth century:

A few of the men “worshipped mom for her bread and her stews and stuff like that … Another thing they never could understand were toutons.” The men would ask Mary’s mother for her bread and touton recipe, which baffled her a little. She would say, “There’s no recipe, you just mix a bit of this and a bit of that,” but as Mary put it, “Now, they were just as wise as my cat would be, you know, because they couldn’t understand—if you didn’t have a recipe, how would you make bread?”

It is much rarer to find them cooked in fatback pork today; the toutons found in local restaurants are more likely fried in a combination of olive oil, clarified butter, or canola oil.

=== Potato toutons ===
Potato toutons represent a distinctive regional variant originating from the Bonavista Peninsula, particularly in the communities of Bonavista, Elliston, and Maberly. This version uses potatoes as the primary ingredient and has been a culinary tradition in the region since the early twentieth century. In other areas, such as the Burin Peninsula, similar preparations are commonly known as potato cakes. These are typically made from mashed potatoes combined with flour, onion, and savory (a herb), then shaped into patties and fried.

=== Tiffin ===
"Tiffin" is one of the most common regional names for toutons. It is generally found in the Bonavista Bay and Central Newfoundland region. However, there are outliers in Labrador and Conception Bay North:

Some of these terms appear remarkably limited in their regional distribution. Tiffin, for example, appears to be localized in a handful of communities in Northern Bonavista Bay, yet students from one southern Bonavista Bay community reported this term with the meaning 'small lunch', a meaning which also occurs in regional British as well as in Indian English.

The manufacture of tiffins is similar to descriptions given above for toutons. One 1979 account from Bonavista Bay relates,

When mother was making bread and dough has risen she would cut pieces off, about the size of a doughnut and fry them. These were tiffins. Some people also call them scons but this may not be restricted to Wesleyville.

Other versions of the word include tiffen-bread, and sintiffin.

=== Baked salt pork bun ===
In some parts of Newfoundland, a touton is a baked cake or bun, often made with diced salted pork in the dough. In 1971, mother and housewife Marie Harris of Glovertown provided this "old Nfld recipe passed on orally among friends & mothers to daughters":

...a plain tea cake made of flour, sugar, water (or milk), butter, salt & small pieces of white pork. This was well mixed until it formed a dough which was rolled to a thickness of 1/3 - 1/2 inch and then cut into circles. The cakes were baked in an ovan [sic] of 350F and eaten when ready, hot or cold (Delicious cakes). [also add baking powder to ingredients!] Not to be confused with tiffins.

Another typical description is the one given by Mr. Margaret Cook (born in Coachman's Cove) to folklorist John Widdowson in 1964:

The toutons then, you take them an' roll them up with the pork, see - pork toutons. No, no, not bread, no, just the flour. Take the flour an' put the pork in and the bakin' powders, whatever you have an' then roll them an bake ('em). That's the toutons.

== Condiments ==
The traditional accompaniment to toutons is a drizzle of molasses or a pat of butter. Less common toppings include maple syrup, sugar, cinnamon, honey, raisin sauce, and fruit jams.

A common alternative to plain molasses is coady (also spelled cody or lassy coady), a sweet sauce typically made by simmering 1 cup molasses, 1/4 cup water, 3 tablespoons butter, and 1 tablespoon vinegar or lemon juice for about 10 minutes. Coady may include fresh or powdered ginger, along with other warm spices.

== Popular culture ==
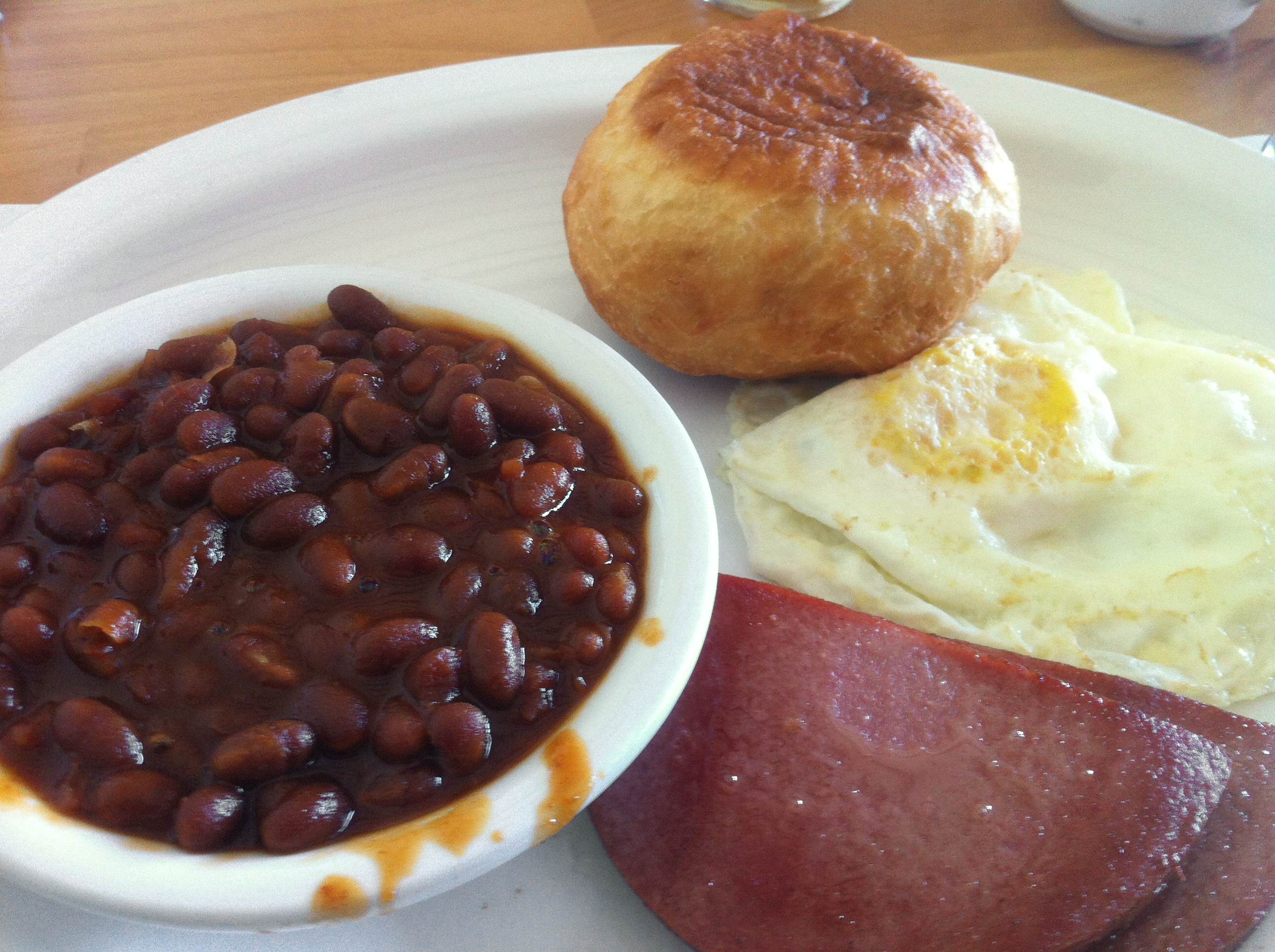
A touton (top), with fried egg, bologna and beans

By the late 1980s to early 2000s, toutons emerged as a symbol or reminder of Newfoundland identity. Wayne Johnston's 1987 novel The Time of Their Lives has a character exclaim, "She loved toutons, balls of fried dough. I remember her making toutons for herself, grabbing out handful after handful of dough from a big bread pan." A 2000 newspaper column by Memorial University student Kelley Power references the "full fledged Black Horse drinking, touton eating Newfoundlander." Provincial expats have spread their love of toutons across Canada, and Chef Mark Burton of the Four Seasons Hotel Vancouver has offered upscale touton fritters with molasses and butter. Bed and breakfast establishments and tour operators within the province serve up toutons to visiting tourists as part of "The True Newfoundland & Labrador." In 2015, the Downhome magazine sponsored the "Clash of the Toutons" competition to pick the best restaurant-made toutons in the province. The winners, picked by popular vote out of 47 restaurants, were Betty and Graham Badcock of the Madrock Cafe in Bay Roberts:

“It’s like friggin’ magic,” exclaims Betty. “We’re so busy in the summertime, my darlin’, I can’t even tell you what day of the week it is.” At the peak of tourist season, Betty says customers have waited up to two hours outside the café for their turn at a table. And yes, many of them are waiting for toutons. That’s no wonder, because Betty has a touton to suit just about anybody’s taste. Made from homemade dough, they come white or whole wheat, BLT sandwich-style or as a Madrock Touton - that’s a touton served with a fried egg in the centre.

Toutons are referenced in the hit musical Come from Away and Newfoundland-born Petrina Bromley, a member of the original Broadway cast, introduced fellow members of the cast and crew to the fried dough version while in La Jolla. In 2018, Nova Scotia's Andy Hay prepared toutons as his dessert course in the season finale competition of MasterChef Canada.

== Alternative names ==
A wide range of regional names exist for toutons, made complicated by the fact that different speakers may be referencing any of the major variants above, and that some of the terms applied to toutons (e.g., bang belly or flapjacks) may also refer to altogether different foodstuffs.

- bang belly (also refers to various types of baked buns/puddings)
- chobies (Glovertown. 1970s-80s-90s)
- cushions (Western Newfoundland)
- damper dogs (St. John's. 1960s)
- damper devils (possibly St. John's)
- dicky dough (Trinity Bay)
- dunkie doughs (Random Island. 1980s-90s)
- fan-titties (Jackson's Arm. 1970s)
- flacoons (Freshwater, Placentia Bay. 1970s. Possibly from Old French flacon - "bottle" - used to roll out dough)
- flackers (Stephenville Crossing)
- flapjacks (Fortune Harbour. 1960s. Also refers to a more traditional pancake.)
- flats (Bonavista, possibly.)
- flitters (Lumsden, also Great Northern Peninsula, particularly in the Straits. Most likely a corruption of "fritters.")
- flummy/flummies (Northwest River, Labrador. 1960s. More like a bread cooked on top of a stove, often made by trappers).
- freezie (Central Newfoundland)
- fried dough (Red Bay)
- frozie (Calvert; Bishop’s Falls; Bonavista Bay; southern Labrador. Can also refer to a molasses pork cake, or even a deep fried touton.)
- gandies (Fischells; St. George's; Stephenville. 1950s.)
- gangees (Point Leamington)
- luski/luskinikn (traditional Mi'kmaq. Possibly more of a bannock. Word is "literally ‘four cents’ – because it costs so little to make.")
- pan cakes or pan bread (Cartwright)
- panitsiak (Nunatsiavut. Possibly more of a bannock. Also mappa cake, mukmuk cake, and sunamajuk.)
- pooies (Bay Roberts)
- posies (Northern Bay. 1940s/50s)
- puffy-ups (Possibly Bonavista)
- scons (Miawpukek. circa 1987; also Wesleyville, see tiffin above)
- stove cakes (L’anse au Diable, Labrador. 1970s.)
- tommy's/tommies (Hooping Harbour; Harbour Deep. mid 20th-century, 1970s.)
- touten (Elliston. 1960s.)
- toutins (North River, Conception Bay. 1960s)
- toutons with holes in them (Point Leamington, Fortune Harbour)
- towtents (pork cakes. 1890s.)
- tushin
- zachingles/sachingiels (Cape St. George / Mainland)

== See also ==
- List of doughnut varieties
- List of breakfast foods
