= Eddie Joyce =

Canadian politician (born 1956)

The Honourable Eddie Joyce ECNL MHA

Leader of the Opposition in Newfoundland & Labrador
- In office July 18, 2013 – November 17, 2013
- Preceded by: Dwight Ball
- Succeeded by: Dwight Ball

Minister of Municipal Affairs, Minister of Environment, Minister of Service NL, Minister Responsible for fire and Emergency services- NL, Minister Responsible for the Government Purchasing Agency, Minister Responsible for the Multi-Materials Stewardship Board, Minister Responsible for the office of climate change, Minister Responsible for Workplace NL, And Registrar General
- In office December 14, 2015 – April 26, 2018
- Preceded by: Kevin O'Brien
- Succeeded by: Andrew Parsons

Interim Leader of the Liberal Party of Newfoundland and Labrador
- In office July 18, 2013 – November 17, 2013
- Preceded by: Dwight Ball (interim)
- Succeeded by: Dwight Ball

Member of the Newfoundland and Labrador House of Assembly for Humber-Bay of Islands Bay of Islands (1989, 1999–2007, 2011–2015)
- Incumbent
- Assumed office October 27, 2011
- Preceded by: Terry Loder
- In office February 9, 1999 – October 9, 2007
- Preceded by: Brian Tobin
- Succeeded by: Terry Loder
- In office April 20, 1989 – April 21, 1989
- Preceded by: Ted Blanchard
- Succeeded by: Clyde Wells

Personal details
- Born: October 19, 1956 (age 69)
- Party: Independent (since 2018); Liberal (1989–2018)
- Occupation: Political Assistant

Edward Joyce (born October 19, 1956) is a Canadian politician who represents the district of Humber-Bay of Islands in the Newfoundland and Labrador House of Assembly. Originally a member of the Liberal Party, he served as the party's interim leader and the leader of the official opposition in the House of Assembly from July until November 2013. He served as a cabinet minister in the Ball government from 2015 to 2018.

He was born in Curling and was educated in Corner Brook's Memorial University campus, and at Acadia University. He won a bronze medal in boxing at the 1975 Canada Winter Games. Joyce served as chair of the Canadian Paraplegic Association. In 2000, he was elected to the Newfoundland and Labrador Soccer Hall of Fame.

== Politics ==
Joyce was first elected in the 1989 election — however, as party leader Clyde Wells had been defeated by Lynn Verge in his own riding despite leading the Liberal Party to victory, Joyce stepped aside to allow Wells to contest the seat in a by-election. He worked in the executive offices of Wells and his successor as Premier, Brian Tobin, until the 1999 election, when he ran for office again in Bay of Islands. He won the seat and served until the 2007 election, when he was defeated by Terry Loder. In October 2010, Joyce announced that he would re-seek the Liberal nomination; further, in the 2011 provincial election, Joyce defeated Loder to reclaim his old seat.

On July 18, 2013 Joyce was named Leader of the Opposition and interim Liberal leader, replacing Dwight Ball who resigned to run for the provincial leadership permanently in the party's 2013 convention. Following the Liberals forming government in the 2015 election, Joyce was named to provincial cabinet. On April 25, 2018, Joyce was formally accused of harassment by another Liberal MHA. He was subsequently removed from cabinet and caucus pending the outcome of an investigation.

On August 27, 2018, CBC released a copy of the Commissioner for Legislative Standards report regarding allegations made by fellow Liberal MHA Colin Holloway which cleared Joyce and Dale Kirby of any wrongdoing. On October 21, 2018, the Commissioner's report regarding the complaints made by Sherry Gambin-Walsh was leaked to the public. The report found that Joyce had broken the code of conduct for elected officials when he lobbied Minister Gambin-Walsh to hire a friend of his for a government job; Joyce was cleared on all other allegations. On November 16, 2018 Joyce confirmed that he had been denied re-entry into the Liberal caucus.

Joyce contested the 2019 provincial election as an independent candidate in Humber-Bay of Islands. He was re-elected as an independent. In the 2021 provincial election, Joyce was again re-elected. Joyce was re-elected in the 2025 Newfoundland and Labrador general election.

Following the retirement of MHA Tom Osborne in 2024, Joyce became the province's longest serving MHA. Joyce has been in the House of Assembly since 2011; he also previously served between 1999 and 2007.

On September 17, 2026, Joyce voted to approve the Churchill Falls Definitive Cooperation and Implementation Agreement (DCIA) in the House of Assembly along with the PC caucus.

== Electoral record ==
2025 Newfoundland and Labrador general election: Humber-Bay of Islands
Party	Candidate	Votes	%	±%
Independent	Eddie Joyce	3,433	72.14	+0.53
Liberal	Meghan Parsons	735	15.44	-2.31
Progressive Conservative	Ethan Wheeler-Park	514	10.80	+0.16
New Democratic	Collin Glavac	77	1.62	
Total valid votes		4,759		
Total rejected ballots				
Turnout				
Eligible voters				
Independent hold		Swing		+1.42

2021 Newfoundland and Labrador general election: Humber-Bay of Islands
Party	Candidate	Votes	%	±%
Independent	Eddie Joyce	2,988	71.60	+4.41
Liberal	Stelman Flynn	741	17.76	+0.56
Progressive Conservative	Robert Marche	444	10.64	+0.03
Total valid votes		4,173	97.87	
Total rejected ballots		91	2.13	
Turnout		4,264	41.00	
Eligible voters		10,399		
Independent hold		Swing		+1.93
Source: Elections Newfoundland and Labrador

2019 Newfoundland and Labrador general election
Party	Candidate	Votes	%	±%
Independent	Eddie Joyce	4,172	67.2%	–
Liberal	Brian Dicks	1,068	17.2%	-67.3
Progressive Conservative	Michael Patrick Holden	659	10.6%	+0.3
New Democratic	Shawn Hodder	310	5.0%	-0.2

2015 Newfoundland and Labrador general election
Party	Candidate	Votes	%	±%
Liberal	Eddie Joyce	4,622	84.5%	+33.28
Progressive Conservative	Ronald Jesseau	564	10.3%	-27.5
New Democratic	Conor Curtis	282	5.2%	-6.4

2011 Newfoundland and Labrador general election
Party	Candidate	Votes	%	±%
Liberal	Eddie Joyce	2,760	51.22	+5.62
Progressive Conservative	Terry Loder	2,003	37.18	-15.25
NDP	Tony Adey	625	11.6	+9.63

2007 Newfoundland and Labrador general election
Party	Candidate	Votes	%	±%
Progressive Conservative	Terry Loder	2854	52.43	+3.00
Liberal	Eddie Joyce	2482	45.6	-1.33
NDP	Charles Murphy	107	1.97	-1.67

2003 Newfoundland and Labrador general election
Party	Candidate	Votes	%	±%
Liberal	Eddie Joyce	2907	49.43	-8.13
Progressive Conservative	Mike Monaghan	2760	46.93	+15.77
NDP	Dave (Bud) Quigley	214	3.64	-7.64

1999 Newfoundland and Labrador general election
Party	Candidate	Votes	%	±%
Liberal	Eddie Joyce	3164	57.56	-8.11
Progressive Conservative	Paul Hunt	1713	31.16	+3.69
NDP	Israel Hann	620	11.28	+4.43
