= St. John's West =

St. John's West could refer to:

- St. John's West (federal electoral district)
- St. John's West (provincial electoral district)
