= Humber-Bay of Islands =

Provincial electoral district in Newfoundland and Labrador, Canada

Newfoundland and Labrador electoral district
- Humber-Bay of Islands in relation to other district in Newfoundland

Provincial electoral district
- Legislature: Newfoundland and Labrador House of Assembly
MHA
Eddie Joyce
Independent
- District created: 1975
- First contested: 1975
- Last contested: 2025

Demographics
- Population (2006): 9,936
- Electors (2015): 13,412

Humber-Bay of Islands is a provincial electoral district for the House of Assembly of Newfoundland and Labrador, Canada. In 2015, the district had 13,412 eligible voters.

It contains the towns of Irishtown, Hughes Brook, Summerside, Meadows, Gillams, McIvers, Cox's Cove, Mount Moriah, York Harbour, Lark Harbour, and Humber Arm South (Benoit's Cove, Frenchmen's Cove, Halfway Point, and Wood's Island).

While historically, the Curling area of Corner Brook was part of the district. The district was reconfigured in 2015 to include the Humbermouth area of the City of Corner Brook, while maintaining the north and south shores of the Bay of Islands and the Curling area of the city. The Humbermouth area of Corner Brook was previously included in the district of Humber East.

While not a wealthy district, Humber-Bay of Islands is more economically vibrant than other rural districts. Its economy is driven by the fishery and tourism, to a limited extent. Many residents work in Corner Brook.

This district was home to back-to-back premiers. Immediately after becoming leader of the Liberals, Brian Tobin chose this district, vacated by Clyde Wells. Former Liberal Cabinet Minister Eddie Joyce is currently MHA; he was re-elected as an independent in 2019.

== Members of the House of Assembly ==
The district has elected the following members of the House of Assembly:

Assembly	Years	Member	Party
Bay of Islands
37th	1975–1979	Luke Woodrow	Progressive Conservative
38th	1979–1982	Luke Woodrow	Progressive Conservative
39th	1982–1985	Luke Woodrow	Progressive Conservative
40th	1985–1989	Ted Blanchard	Progressive Conservative
41st	1989	Eddie Joyce	Liberal
41st	1989–1993	Clyde Wells	Liberal
42nd	1993–1996	Clyde Wells	Liberal
43rd	1996–1999	Brian Tobin	Liberal
44th	1999–2003	Eddie Joyce	Liberal
45th	2003–2007	Eddie Joyce	Liberal
46th	2007–2011	Terry Loder	Progressive Conservative
47th	2011–2015	Eddie Joyce	Liberal
Humber - Bay of Islands
48th	2015–2018	Eddie Joyce	Liberal
48th	2018–2019	Eddie Joyce	Independent
49th	2019–2021	Eddie Joyce	Independent
50th	2021–2025	Eddie Joyce	Independent
51st	2025–present	Eddie Joyce	Independent

== Election results ==
Graph of election results (minor parties that never got 2% of the vote or did not run consistently are omitted) View source data.

=== Humber-Bay of Islands ===
2025 Newfoundland and Labrador general election
Party	Candidate	Votes	%	±%
Independent	Eddie Joyce	3,433	72.14	+0.53
Liberal	Meghan Parsons	735	15.44	-2.31
Progressive Conservative	Ethan Wheeler-Park	514	10.80	+0.16
New Democratic	Collin Glavac	77	1.62	
Total valid votes		4,759		
Total rejected ballots				
Turnout				
Eligible voters				
Independent hold		Swing		+1.42

2021 Newfoundland and Labrador general election
Party	Candidate	Votes	%	±%
Independent	Eddie Joyce	2,988	71.60	+4.41
Liberal	Stelman Flynn	741	17.76	+0.56
Progressive Conservative	Robert Marche	444	10.64	+0.03
Total valid votes		4,173	97.87	
Total rejected ballots		91	2.13	
Turnout		4,264	41.00	
Eligible voters		10,399		
Independent hold		Swing		+1.93
Source: Elections Newfoundland and Labrador

2019 Newfoundland and Labrador general election
Party	Candidate	Votes	%	±%
Independent	Eddie Joyce	4,172	67.19	–
Liberal	Brian Dicks	1,068	17.20	-67.3
Progressive Conservative	Michael Patrick Holden	659	10.61	+0.3
New Democratic	Shawn A. Hodder	310	4.99	-0.2
Total valid votes		6,209	100	
Total rejected ballots		74		
Turnout		6,283	62.7	+10.0
Eligible voters		10,028		
Independent gain from Liberal		Swing		+67.26

2015 Newfoundland and Labrador general election
Party	Candidate	Votes	%
Liberal	Eddie Joyce	4,622	84.53
Progressive Conservative	Ronald Jesseau	564	10.31
New Democratic	Conor Curtis	282	5.16
Total valid votes		5,468	99.54
Total rejected ballots		25	0.46
Turnout		5,493	52.75
Eligible voters		10,414	

=== Bay of Islands ===
2011 Newfoundland and Labrador general election
Party	Candidate	Votes	%	±%
Liberal	Eddie Joyce	2,760	51.22	+5.62
Progressive Conservative	Terry Loder	2,003	37.18	-15.25
New Democratic	Tony Adey	625	11.60	+9.63
Total valid votes		5,388	99.66	
Total rejected ballots		18	0.34	
Turnout		5,406	69.98	
Electors on the lists		7,725	–	

2007 Newfoundland and Labrador general election
Party	Candidate	Votes	%	±%
Progressive Conservative	Terry Loder	2,854	52.43	+3.00
Liberal	Eddie Joyce	2,482	45.60	-1.33
New Democratic	Charles Murphy	107	1.97	-1.67
Total valid votes		5,444	99.63	
Total rejected ballots		20	0.37	
Turnout		5,464	73.45	
Electors on the lists		7,439	–	

2003 Newfoundland and Labrador general election
Party	Candidate	Votes	%	±%
Liberal	Eddie Joyce	2907	49.43	-8.13
Progressive Conservative	Mike Monaghan	2760	46.93	+15.77
NDP	Dave (Bud) Quigley	214	3.64	-7.64

1999 Newfoundland and Labrador general election
Party	Candidate	Votes	%	±%
Liberal	Eddie Joyce	3164	57.56	-8.11
Progressive Conservative	Paul Hunt	1713	31.16	+3.69
NDP	Israel Hann	620	11.28	+4.43

1996 Newfoundland and Labrador general election
Party	Candidate	Votes	%	±%
Liberal	Brian Tobin	3997	65.67	
Progressive Conservative	Paul Hunt	1672	27.47	–
NDP	Hayward Pardy	417	6.85	

== See also ==
- List of Newfoundland and Labrador provincial electoral districts
- Canadian provincial electoral districts
