= Clayton Forsey =

Canadian politician (born 1953)

Member of the Newfoundland and Labrador House of Assembly for Exploits
- In office 2005 – November 27, 2015
- Preceded by: Roger Grimes
- Succeeded by: Jerry Dean

Progressive Conservative Party Caucus Whip
- In office March 31, 2007 – 2015

Personal details
- Born: August 21, 1953 (age 72) Leading Tickles, Newfoundland and Labrador
- Party: Progressive Conservative

Clayton Forsey MHA, (born August 21, 1953) is a Canadian politician, who represented the district of Exploits in the Newfoundland and Labrador House of Assembly from 2005 to 2015. Forsey is a member of the Progressive Conservative Party and served as the Parliamentary Secretary to the Minister Responsible for Forestry and Agrifoods. He was defeated in the 2015 election.

His brother Pleaman Forsey was elected to represent his former district in 2019.

== Electoral record ==
2015 Newfoundland and Labrador general election: Exploits
Party	Candidate	Votes	%	±%
Liberal	Jerry Dean	2,654	50.16%	+34.22
Progressive Conservative	Clayton Forsey	2,489	47.04%	-21.68
New Democratic	Bridget Henley	148	2.80%	-12.53
Total valid votes		5,291	100%	

2011 Newfoundland and Labrador general election: Exploits
Party	Candidate	Votes	%	±%
Progressive Conservative	Clayton Forsey	2,819	68.72%	-3.67
Liberal	Jim Samson	654	15.94%	-11.67
New Democratic	Grant Hameon	629	15.33%	
Total valid votes		4,102	100%	

2007 Newfoundland and Labrador general election
Party	Candidate	Votes	%	±%
Progressive Conservative	Clayton Forsey	3,396	72.39%	–
Liberal	Jody Fancey	1,295	27.61%	

By-election: June 23, 2005 On resignation of Roger Grimes
Party	Candidate	Votes	%	±%
PC	Clayton Forsey	2,605	55.2	
Liberal	George Saunders	1,958	41.5	
NDP	John Whelan	159	3.4	
Total		4,722	100%	

2003 Newfoundland and Labrador general election
Party	Candidate	Votes	%	±%
Liberal	Roger Grimes	3,218	56.14%	
Progressive Conservative	Clayton Forsey	2,346	40.93%	–
NDP	John Whelan	168	2.93%	
