= Ted Blanchard =

Canadian politician

MHA for Bay of Islands
- In office 1985–1989
- Preceded by: Luke Woodrow
- Succeeded by: Eddie Joyce

Minister of Labour
- In office April 24, 1985 – March 27, 1989
- Preceded by: Gerry Ottenheimer
- Succeeded by: Norman Doyle

Personal details
- Born: December 12, 1929
- Died: May 22, 2014 (aged 84)

Theodore Alton "Ted" Blanchard (December 12, 1929 – May 22, 2014) was an educator, civil servant and politician in Newfoundland and Labrador. He represented Bay of Islands in the Newfoundland House of Assembly from 1985 to 1989.

He was born in Gillams. In his teens, he worked for Bowater in Corner Brook as a stevedore before returning to school to earn his teacher's certificate. He worked in a sole-charge school in Trinity East for two years. Blanchard married Joyce Randell in 1950. She contracted tuberculosis and spent two years at a sanitarium in St. John's; their first child died from the disease but his wife recovered and they eventually had five more children. After his first wife died in 2002, he married Maureen Buckle.

He was well known as a fiddle player, taking up the instrument when he was eight. He performed in live music shows on the radio during the 1950s. In 1957, he released Newfoundland Old Time Fiddle Music, the first commercial recording of Newfoundland fiddle music, performing with fiddler Don Randell. He performed in the house band for the CBC television show All Around the Circle. In 2008, Blanchard and Randell received the St. John's Folk Arts Council lifetime achievement award.

He took part in the Royal St. John's Regatta, competing until the age of 78 and also participating as a committee member and coach.

Blanchard worked for the Canadian Unemployment Insurance Commission briefly before joining the provincial public service in 1950. He was CEO of the Newfoundland Labour Relations Board from 1959 to 1968 and was employed with the provincial treasury board during the 1970s. Blanchard held every executive position in the Newfoundland Department of Labour up to and including assistant deputy minister.

He was elected to the Newfoundland assembly in 1985 and served in the provincial cabinet as Minister of Labour. He did not run for reelection in 1989.

In 2012, Blanchard received a Seniors of Distinction Award from the provincial government.

He died in St. John's in 2014 at the age of 84.
