= Sandra Kelly =

Canadian nurse and politician

The Honourable Sandra Kelly ECNL

MHA for Gander
- In office 1996–2003
- Preceded by: Gary Vey
- Succeeded by: Kevin O'Brien

Mayor of Gander, Newfoundland and Labrador
- In office November 10, 1993 – February 29, 1996
- Preceded by: Douglas Sheppard
- Succeeded by: Claude Elliott

Personal details
- Party: Liberal

Sandra Kelly (born April 13, 1949) is a Canadian former elected official. She sat in the Newfoundland and Labrador House of Assembly from 1996 to 2003 as a member of the Liberals. She served as the Minister of Tourism, Culture and Recreation and the Minister of Industry, Trade, and Technology. She represented the electoral district of Gander.

The daughter of Hardy West and Doris Wellon, she was born Sandra West in Gander and was educated there, at the General Hospital School of Nursing in St. John's and at Dalhousie University, where she received a diploma in community health nursing. In 1970, she married Ronald Patrick Kelly. She was Mayor of Gander from 1993 to 1996.

She was elected to the Newfoundland assembly in 1996 and re-elected in 1999. She chose not to run for re-election in 2003.
