= Richard Cashin =

Canadian politician

The Honourable Richard Cashin PC OC ONL

Member of Parliament for St. John's West
- In office 18 June 1962 – 24 June 1968
- Preceded by: William Joseph Browne
- Succeeded by: Walter Carter

Personal details
- Born: Richard Joseph Cashin; 5 January 1937 (age 89) St. John's, Dominion of Newfoundland
- Party: Liberal
- Other political affiliations: New Democratic Party of Canada (1970s onwards)

Richard Joseph Cashin PC OC ONL (born 5 January 1937), is a lawyer, former Canadian politician and trade union leader.

The grandson of Sir Michael Cashin, KBE and nephew of Peter Cashin, Richard Cashin is a member of a prominent Newfoundland political family. He was first elected to the House of Commons of Canada in the 1962 general election as the Liberal Member of Parliament (MP) for St. John's West. He remained an MP throughout the Pearson era, being re-elected in 1963 and 1965 elections.

He was named parliamentary secretary to the Minister of Fisheries in 1966. After several years as an MP, during Progressive Conservative and Liberal minority governments, Cashin suffered a major upset when he was one of the few incumbent Liberal MPs to lose his seat in the 1968 general election that returned a Liberal majority government led by Pierre Trudeau.

After his political defeat, Cashin returned to his law practice. He won a major settlement for fishermen in Placentia Bay in a lawsuit against the Electric Reduction Company whose toxic waste damaged the local fishery industry.

In 1970, Cashin joined with Father Desmond McGrath in a successful effort to organize fishers into a new trade union, which became the Fish, Food and Allied Workers Union. Cashin and McGrath crossed the province organizing the union, and at the union's founding convention held in 1971, Cashin was elected its first president. The union was successful in pressuring fishing companies in Burgeo to negotiate a contract in 1972, and led trawlermen in successful strike action in 1975. Through these actions, the union grew and established itself as the largest union in the province.

Cashin moved to the left in the 1970s and supported candidates of the New Democratic Party. Despite being appointed to the board of directors of government-owned oil company Petro-Canada by Prime Minister Pierre Trudeau, he led the union to endorse the NDP in the 1980s, and became a vice-president of the party. In 1987, his influence resulted in the Fish, Food and Allied Workers Union disaffiliating from the United Food and Commercial Workers and joining the Canadian Auto Workers.

In 1989, he was made an Officer of the Order of Canada. Cashin was sworn into the Queen's Privy Council for Canada in 1992 allowing him to use the style The Honourable.
