= Martin O'Brien (politician) =

Canadian politician

Member of the Newfoundland and Labrador House of Assembly for Ferryland
- In office 1976–1977
- Preceded by: Charlie Power
- Succeeded by: Charlie Power

Personal details
- Party: Liberal Party of Newfoundland and Labrador

Martin O'Brien is a former Canadian politician who was elected to the Newfoundland and Labrador House of Assembly in the 1976 by-election. He represented the electoral district of Ferryland as a member of the Liberal Party of Newfoundland and Labrador.

O'Brien initially ran in the general election, losing to Progressive Conservative Charlie Power by eight votes; the results were later challenged in court and nullified. O'Brien then defeated Power in the ensuing by-election by a margin of nine votes, and O'Brien was seated briefly as the member for Ferryland. Power challenged the results of the election once again, alleging irregularities and another by-election was set in 1977 after the challenge was successful. O'Brien did not re-offer as a candidate in this election and Power won by a larger margin.
