= Alexander Dunphy =

Canadian politician (1928–1999)

Alexander Dunphy MHA

Member of the Newfoundland House of Assembly for St. George's
- In office October 28, 1971 – September 16, 1975
- Preceded by: William Keough
- Succeeded by: Hazel McIsaac

Personal details
- Born: Alexander M. Dunphy Jr. October 23, 1928 Curling, Newfoundland
- Died: January 14, 1999 (aged 70) St. John's, Newfoundland, Canada
- Party: Progressive Conservative
- Spouse: Mary Elizabeth Burton (m. 1962)
- Children: 4
- Education: Saint Francis Xavier University
- Occupation: Businessman

Alexander M. Dunphy, Jr. (October 23, 1928 – January 14, 1999) was a Canadian businessman and politician from Newfoundland. He represented St. George's in the Newfoundland House of Assembly from 1971 to 1975.

== Biography ==
The son of Alexander M. Dunphy and Isabella McLellan, he was born in Curling and was educated at Saint Bonaventure's College and Saint Francis Xavier University. In 1962, Dunphy married Mary Elizabeth Burton. He served as mayor of Steady Brook from 1970 to 1971. Dunphy served on the executive of the Progressive Conservative Association from 1968 to 1971.
