= Hazel Newhook =

Canadian politician (1914–2016)

MHA for Gander
- In office 1979–1985
- Preceded by: Harold Collins
- Succeeded by: Winston Baker

Mayor of Gander
- In office May 16, 1973 – November 9, 1977
- Preceded by: Royal Cooper
- Succeeded by: Lloyd Mercer

Personal details
- Born: December 24, 1914 Grand Falls, Dominion of Newfoundland
- Died: June 26, 2016 (aged 101) Gander, Newfoundland and Labrador, Canada
- Party: Progressive Conservative

Hazel Rose Newhook ONL (December 24, 1914 – June 26, 2016) was a Canadian politician, who sat in the Newfoundland House of Assembly from 1979 to 1985 as a member of the Progressive Conservatives, where she represented the electoral district of Gander. She also served as mayor of Gander from 1973 to 1977.

Newhook and her caucus colleague Lynn Verge were appointed to the Executive Council of Newfoundland by Premier Brian Peckford in 1979, becoming the first two women ever to serve in the provincial cabinet. She was awarded the Order of Newfoundland and Labrador in 2009. She turned 100 in December 2014 and died on June 26, 2016, at the age of 101.
