= Crummell =

Crummell is a surname. Notable people with the surname include:

- Alexander Crummell (1819–1898), African-American minister, academic and African nationalist
- Dan Crummell, Canadian politician
