= James Augustine Power =

Canadian lawyer and politician

James A. Power

Member of Parliament for St. John's West
- In office August 1953 – June 1957

Personal details
- Born: 14 September 1903 St. John's, Newfoundland
- Died: 9 February 1975 (aged 71) St. John's, Newfoundland and Labrador, Canada
- Party: Liberal
- Profession: lawyer

James Augustine Power (14 September 1903 – 9 February 1975) was a Liberal party member of the House of Commons of Canada and a lawyer. He was born in St. John's, Newfoundland.

He was first elected at the St. John's West riding in the 1953 general election. After serving his only Parliamentary term, the 22nd Canadian Parliament, he was defeated by William Joseph Browne of the Progressive Conservative party.

He died on 9 February 1975 and was interred at Belvedere Cemetery in St. John's.
