= List of mayors of Gander, Newfoundland and Labrador =

This is a list of mayors of Gander, Newfoundland and Labrador.

== Mayors ==
Name	Term start	Term end
Jack Robertson	January 23, 1959	June 10, 1969
Royal Cooper	June 11, 1969	July 14, 1970
Douglas Sheppard	July 15, 1970	October 5, 1971
John Anstey	October 25, 1971	February 13, 1973
Royal Cooper	February 14, 1973	May 15, 1973
Hazel Newhook	May 16, 1973	November 9, 1977
Lloyd Mercer	November 10, 1977	November 15, 1981
Douglas Sheppard	November 16, 1981	November 9, 1993
Sandra Kelly	November 10, 1993	February 29, 1996
Claude Elliott	March 6, 1996	September 27, 2017
Percy Farwell	September 28, 2017	Present
