= Bettina Ford =

Canadian politician

Bettina Ford MHA

Member of the Newfoundland and Labrador House of Assembly for Gander
- Incumbent
- Assumed office October 14, 2025
- Preceded by: John Haggie

Personal details
- Born: 1975 (age 50–51) Gander, Newfoundland, Canada
- Party: Liberal

Bettina Ford (born 1975) is a Canadian politician from the Liberal Party of Newfoundland and Labrador. In the 2025 Newfoundland and Labrador general election she was elected to the Newfoundland and Labrador House of Assembly in Gander.

== Career ==
In 1997, Ford became one of the youngest municipal officials in Newfoundland and Labrador.

She was a Voluntary Resources Coordinator for the Community Sector Council of NL. She is also Deputy Mayor of the Town of Gander.

Since the Liberals lost the election, Ford entered the House of Assembly in opposition. She is the opposition critic for the ministries of Tourism, Culture and Arts, Sport, Recreation and Parks, PictureNL, the Newfoundland and Labrador Arts Council, and the Pippy Park Commission.

== Election results ==
2025 Newfoundland and Labrador general election: Gander
Party	Candidate	Votes	%	±%
Liberal	Bettina Ford	3,063	58.29	-12.65
Progressive Conservative	Tom Healey	2,054	39.09	+13.15
New Democratic	Justin Foley	138	2.63	-0.50
Total valid votes		5,255		
Total rejected ballots				
Turnout				
Eligible voters				
Liberal hold		Swing		-12.90
