= Terry Loder =

Canadian politician

Member of the Newfoundland and Labrador House of Assembly for Bay of Islands
- In office November 1, 2007 – September 19, 2011
- Preceded by: Eddie Joyce
- Succeeded by: Eddie Joyce

Personal details
- Born: February 3, 1953 (age 73)
- Party: Progressive Conservative Party of Newfoundland and Labrador
- Spouse: Vivian Loder
- Children: 2 (Stacy and Mallory)

Terry Loder (born February 3, 1953) is a Canadian politician in Newfoundland and Labrador, Canada. He represented the district of Bay of Islands in the Newfoundland and Labrador House of Assembly from 2007 to 2011. He is a member of the Progressive Conservative Party. In the 2011 provincial election, Loder was defeated by former MHA Eddie Joyce, who reclaimed the seat.

== Electoral history ==
2011 Newfoundland and Labrador general election
Party	Candidate	Votes	%	±%
Liberal	Eddie Joyce	2,760	51.22	+5.62
Progressive Conservative	Terry Loder	2,003	37.18	-15.25
New Democratic	Tony Adey	625	11.60	+9.63
Total valid votes		5,388	99.66	
Total rejected ballots		18	0.34	
Turnout		5,406	69.98	
Electors on the lists		7,725	–	

2007 Newfoundland and Labrador general election
Party	Candidate	Votes	%	±%
Progressive Conservative	Terry Loder	2,854	52.43	+3.00
Liberal	Eddie Joyce	2,482	45.60	-1.33
New Democratic	Charles Murphy	107	1.97	-1.67
Total valid votes		5,444	99.63	
Total rejected ballots		20	0.37	
Turnout		5,464	73.45	
Electors on the lists		7,439	–	
