= Gary Vey =

Canadian politician

MHA for Gander
- In office 1995–1996
- Preceded by: Winston Baker
- Succeeded by: Sandra Kelly

Personal details
- Party: Liberal

Gary Vey was a Canadian politician, who sat in the Newfoundland House of Assembly from 1995 to 1996 as a member of the Liberals. He represented the electoral district of Gander.
