= Jerry Dean =

Canadian politician

Jerry Dean MHA

Member of the Newfoundland and Labrador House of Assembly for Exploits
- In office November 30, 2015 – April 17, 2019
- Preceded by: Clayton Forsey
- Succeeded by: Pleaman Forsey

Personal details
- Party: Liberal

Jerry H. Dean is a Canadian politician, who was elected to the Newfoundland and Labrador House of Assembly in the 2015 provincial election. He represented the electoral district of Exploits as a member of the Liberal Party until his loss in the 2019 election.

Prior to his election to the legislature, Dean was the mayor of Botwood.
