= Gerald S. Doyle =

Businessperson and folk music collector (b. 1892, d. 1956)

- Born: Gerald Stanley Doyle; September 26, 1892; King's Cove, Newfoundland
- Died: June 12, 1956 (aged 63); St. John's, Newfoundland, Canada
- Occupation: businessman
- Notable work: Old-Time Songs and Poetry of Newfoundland

Gerald Stanley Doyle, OBE KSG (September 26, 1892 – July 12, 1956) was a Newfoundlander and Canadian businessman who is well known for his compilation of Newfoundland folk music.

== Early life ==
Doyle was born in King's Cove, Newfoundland, to Thomas Doyle and Margaret Devine. As a child, the Doyle family moved to St. John's, where Gerald Doyle become an apprentice at the Wadden's Drug Store in Water Street.

== Career ==
This developed into a career selling patented medicines and cod liver oil around the coasts of Newfoundland and the Caribbean. He formally incorporated these practices into his own business, Gerald S. Doyle Limited, in 1929.

== Preservation ==
Around this time, Doyle became invested in the preservation of Newfoundland's culture and heritage. He began publishing the Old-Time Songs and Poetry of Newfoundland in 1927, giving them away free of charge in outport communities and including advertisements for his business endeavors. The year before, he established a newsletter titled The Family Fireside, which published community news, local folklore legends, and traditional music submissions by readers. In addition to this, he debuted the Gerald S. Doyle News Bulletin on the radio station VONF in 1932, which aired information of personal interest to outport fishermen. Doyle is credited for the popularization and modern perception of Newfoundland folk music.

== Death and legacy ==
Doyle died in St. John's in 1956. His son, Thomas Mershon Doyle, later entered politics and became the MHA for Ferryland. The Gerald S. Doyle Memorial Museum was established in King's Cove in his honour, and his efforts preserving Newfoundland culture are commemorated to this day.
