= Pleaman Forsey =

Canadian politician

The Honourable Pleaman Forsey ECNL MHA

Member of the Newfoundland and Labrador House of Assembly for Exploits
- Incumbent
- Assumed office May 16, 2019
- Preceded by: Jerry Dean

Minister of Forestry, Agriculture and Lands
- Incumbent
- Assumed office October 29, 2025
- Premier: Tony Wakeham
- Preceded by: Lisa Dempster

Minister of Crown Lands
- Incumbent
- Assumed office October 29, 2025
- Preceded by: Office established

Minister of Emergency Preparedness and Disaster Management
- Incumbent
- Assumed office February 23, 2026
- Preceded by: Helen Conway-Ottenheimer

Personal details
- Party: Progressive Conservative

Pleaman Forsey is a Canadian politician, who was elected to the Newfoundland and Labrador House of Assembly in the 2019 provincial election. He represents the electoral district of Exploits as a member of the Newfoundland and Labrador Progressive Conservative Party. He was re-elected in the 2021 provincial election. Forsey supported Tony Wakeham in the 2023 provincial PC party leadership race.

Forsey was re-elected in the 2025 Newfoundland and Labrador general election.

On October 29, 2025, Forsey was appointed to Minister of Forestry, Agriculture, and Lands, and Minister of Crown Lands.

On September 17, 2026, Forsey voted to approve the Churchill Falls Definitive Cooperation and Implementation Agreement (DCIA) in the House of Assembly along with the PC caucus.

== Personal life ==
He is the brother of Clayton Forsey, who represented the same district in the legislature from 2005 to 2015.

== Election results ==
2025 Newfoundland and Labrador general election: Exploits
Party	Candidate	Votes	%	±%
Progressive Conservative	Pleaman Forsey	3,406	61.0%	+6.20
Liberal	Fabian Power	2,019	36.2%	-9.18
New Democratic	Dawn Lahey	160	2.9%	-
Total valid votes		5,585		
Total rejected ballots				
Turnout				
Eligible voters				
Progressive Conservative hold		Swing		+

2021 Newfoundland and Labrador general election: Exploits
Party	Candidate	Votes	%	±%
Progressive Conservative	Pleaman Forsey	2,641	54.80	+5.36
Liberal	Rodney Mercer	2,178	45.20	+12.10
Total valid votes		4,819	99.05	
Total rejected ballots		46	0.95	
Turnout		4,865	51.50	
Eligible voters		9,447		
Progressive Conservative hold		Swing		-3.37
Source(s) "Officially Nominated Candidates General Election 2021" (PDF). Elections Newfoundland and Labrador. "NL Election 2021 Report" (PDF).

2019 Newfoundland and Labrador general election
Party	Candidate	Votes	%	±%
Progressive Conservative	Pleaman Forsey	2,874	49.4	+2.4
Liberal	Jerry Dean	1,924	33.1	-17.1
Independent	Gloria Cooper	1,015	17.5	-
Total valid votes		5,813	100	
Total rejected ballots		17		
Turnout		5,830	64.7	
Eligible voters		9,015		
