= Jean Payne =

Canadian politician (1939–2020)

Jean Payne (12 May 1939 – 4 March 2020) was a member of the House of Commons of Canada from 1993 to 1997. She was born in St. John's, Newfoundland, and was a businessperson by career.

She was elected in the 1993 federal election at the St. John's West electoral district for the Liberal party. Payne left federal politics after serving in the 35th Canadian Parliament and did not seek another term in office in the 1997 federal election.

Parliament of Canada
Preceded by John Crosbie, Progressive Conservative	Member of Parliament for St. John's West; 1993–1997	Succeeded by Charlie Power, Progressive Conservative
