= Thomas Doyle (Canadian politician) =

Canadian politician

Thomas Mershon Doyle MHA

Member of the Newfoundland House of Assembly for Ferryland
- In office October 28, 1971 – September 16, 1975
- Preceded by: Aidan Maloney
- Succeeded by: Charlie Power

Minister of Rehabilitation And Recreation
- In office May 2, 1973 – September 27, 1976
- Preceded by: Joseph G. Rousseau
- Succeeded by: Harold Collins

Personal details
- Born: February 7, 1932 St. John's, Newfoundland
- Died: December 9, 2007 (aged 75) St. John's, Newfoundland and Labrador, Canada
- Party: Progressive Conservative
- Spouse: Patricia Kieley
- Parent: Gerald S. Doyle (father)
- Profession: Businessman

Thomas Mershon Doyle (February 7, 1932 – December 9, 2007) was a businessperson and politician in Newfoundland. He represented Ferryland in the Newfoundland House of Assembly from 1971 to 1975 as a Progressive Conservative.

The son of Gerald S. Doyle and Marjorie Mershon, he was born in St. John's and was educated at Saint Bonaventure's College and St. Michael's College, going on to study business marketing in Great Britain. Doyle joined the family business in 1954, becoming director and vice-president of marketing by 1971. From 1965 to 1969, he served on St. John's City Council as an alderman.

Doyle married Patricia Kieley.

He was elected to the Newfoundland assembly in 1971 and reelected in 1972. Doyle served in the provincial cabinet as Minister of Supply and Services, Minister of Tourism and Minister of Rehabilitation and Recreation. He was defeated when he ran for reelection in 1975.

Doyle served as president of the Newfoundland Alcohol and Drug Addiction Foundation. In 1981, he was named finance director for the provincial Progressive Conservative Party. He died in a palliative care centre in St. John's at the age of 75.
