= Corner Brook Transit =

Public transportation provider in Newfoundland and Labrador, Canada

- Founded: 1981 (Van/Jitney Service 1940s-1977)
- Headquarters: Watson's Pond Industrial Park
- Service area: Corner Brook, Curling, Newfoundland and Labrador
- Service type: bus service
- Routes: 2
- Fleet: 3
- Daily ridership: Approx. 4,000 Monthly
- Fuel type: Gasoline
- Operator: Buckles Busing Ltd.
- Website: Corner Brook Transit

Corner Brook Transit is a provider of public transportation to the residents of Corner Brook, Newfoundland and Labrador, Canada. Municipally managed, the service is provided under contract by Buckles Busing LTD. There are two routes that run from 7 a.m. to 6 p.m. Monday through Friday, with destinations including Murphy Square and the downtown area. In response to declining ridership, a pilot project is set to be initiated to reformulated the routes.

The transit agency has instituted a NextBus realtime transit location system, which will provide data to internet and cell phone users on vehicle ETAs.

The fleet consists of three gasoline fueled Ford E-Series Cutaway buses. Two of the old diesel buses have been kept as back-ups.

== Routes ==
- 5: Curling and Grenfell/Windsor/Plaza/Murphy Square - combines former Routes 1 and 2
- 6: Country/Pratt/Grenfell and Humber/Murphy Square - combines former Routes 3 and 4

== See also ==
- Public transport in Canada
