= Winston Baker =

Canadian politician

The Honourable Winston Baker ECNL

MHA for Gander
- In office 1985–1995
- Preceded by: Hazel Newhook
- Succeeded by: Gary Vey

Personal details
- Born: December 17, 1939 (age 86) Grand Bank, Dominion of Newfoundland
- Party: Liberal

Winston Baker (born December 17, 1939) was a Canadian politician, who sat in the Newfoundland House of Assembly from 1985 to 1995 as a member of the Liberals. He represented the electoral district of Gander.

Baker was deputy mayor for Gander from 1981 to 1985. He was defeated by Hazel Newhook when he ran for the Gander seat in the Newfoundland assembly in 1982; Baker defeated Newhook to win the seat in 1985. He ran unsuccessfully for the party leadership in 1987, losing to Clyde Wells. Baker served as government house leader, president of the Treasury Board and Minister of Finance. Baker resigned his seat in 1995.
