= Gander (electoral district) =

Provincial electoral district in Newfoundland and Labrador, Canada

Newfoundland and Labrador electoral district
- Coordinates: 48.887°N 54.873°W

Provincial electoral district
- Legislature: Newfoundland and Labrador House of Assembly
MHA
Bettina Ford
Liberal
- District created: 1967
- First contested: 1971
- Last contested: 2025

Demographics
- Population (2011): 14,725
- Electors (2015): 9,874
- Area (km²): 3,250
- Pop. density (per km²): 4.5
- Census division(s): Division No. 6, Division No. 7
- Census subdivision(s): Appleton, Benton, Gambo, Gander, Glenwood

Gander is a provincial electoral district for the House of Assembly of Newfoundland and Labrador, Canada.

It includes the town of Gander and the surrounding communities of Appleton, Gambo, Glenwood, and Benton. Gander, which has an airport and military history, is a service centre for a large region of the province. Voters in Gander often swing between the Liberal and Progressive Conservative columns, often electing members who sat on the government benches, making it an important swing district in the province.

== Members of the House of Assembly ==
The district has elected the following members of the House of Assembly:

Assembly	Years	Member	Party
31st	1956-1959	Beaton John Abbott	Liberal
32nd	1959-1962	Beaton John Abbott	Liberal
33rd	1962–1966	Beaton John Abbott	Liberal
34th	1966–1967	Charles Ronald McKay Granger	Liberal
34th	1967–1971	Harold Anthony Collins	Progressive Conservative
35th	1972	Harold Anthony Collins	Progressive Conservative
36th	1972–1975	Harold Anthony Collins	Progressive Conservative
37th	1975–1979	Harold Anthony Collins	Progressive Conservative
38th	1979–1982	Hazel Rose Newhook	Progressive Conservative
39th	1982–1985	Hazel Rose Newhook	Progressive Conservative
40th	1985–1989	Winston Baker	Liberal
41st	1989–1993	Winston Baker	Liberal
42nd	1993–1995	Winston Baker	Liberal
42nd	1995–1996	Gary Vey	Liberal
43rd	1996–1999	Sandra Kelly	Liberal
44th	1999–2003	Sandra Kelly	Liberal
45th	2003–2007	Kevin George O'Brien	Progressive Conservative
46th	2007–2011	Kevin George O'Brien	Progressive Conservative
47th	2011–2015	Kevin George O'Brien	Progressive Conservative
48th	2015–2019	John Haggie	Liberal
49th	2019–2021	John Haggie	Liberal
50th	2021–2025	John Haggie	Liberal
51st	2025–present	Bettina Ford	Liberal

== Election results ==
Graph of election results (minor parties that never got 2% of the vote or did not run consistently are omitted) View source data.

2025 Newfoundland and Labrador general election
Party	Candidate	Votes	%	±%
Liberal	Bettina Ford	3,063	58.29	-12.65
Progressive Conservative	Tom Healey	2,054	39.09	+13.15
New Democratic	Justin Foley	138	2.63	-0.50
Total valid votes		5,255		
Total rejected ballots				
Turnout				
Eligible voters				
Liberal hold		Swing		-12.90

2021 Newfoundland and Labrador general election
Party	Candidate	Votes	%	±%
Liberal	John Haggie	3,358	70.93	+12.36
Progressive Conservative	Jamie Harnum	1,228	25.94	-15.49
New Democratic	Dawn Lahey	148	3.13	
Total valid votes		4,734	99.58	
Total rejected ballots		20	0.42	
Turnout		4,754	47.85	
Eligible voters		9,935		
Liberal hold		Swing		+13.93
Source(s) "Officially Nominated Candidates General Election 2021" (PDF). Elections Newfoundland and Labrador. "NL Election 2021 (Unofficial Results)".

2019 Newfoundland and Labrador general election
Party	Candidate	Votes	%	±%
Liberal	John Haggie	3,311	58.6	-9.0
Progressive Conservative	Ryan Wagg	2,342	41.4	+34.4
Total valid votes		5,653	100	
Total rejected ballots		73		
Turnout		5,726	61.6	+14.1
Eligible voters		9,296		

2015 Newfoundland and Labrador general election
Party	Candidate	Votes	%	±%
Liberal	John Haggie	3,151	67.56	+36.65
New Democratic	Lukas Norman	1,184	25.39	+8.57
Progressive Conservative	Ryan Menchion	329	7.05	-45.22
Total valid votes		4,664	99.53	–
Total rejected ballots		22	0.47	–
Turnout		4,686	47.46	-5.61
Eligible voters		9,874		
Liberal gain from Progressive Conservative		Swing		+22.61
Source: Elections Newfoundland and Labrador

2011 Newfoundland and Labrador general election
Party	Candidate	Votes	%	±%
Progressive Conservative	Kevin O'Brien	2,393	52.27	-22.83
Liberal	Barry Warren	1,415	30.91	+6.01
New Democratic	Lukas Norman	770	16.82	+16.82
Total valid votes		4,578	99.65	–
Total rejected ballots		16	0.35	–
Turnout		4,594	53.07	-2.85
Eligible voters		8,656		
Progressive Conservative hold		Swing		-14.42
Source: Elections Newfoundland and Labrador

2007 Newfoundland and Labrador general election
Party	Candidate	Votes	%	±%
Progressive Conservative	Kevin O'Brien	3,599	75.10	+13.72
Liberal	Stephanie Winsor	1,193	24.90	-7.82
Total valid votes		4,792	99.01	–
Total rejected ballots		48	0.99	–
Turnout		4,840	55.92	-2.59
Eligible voters		8,656		
Progressive Conservative hold		Swing		+10.77
Source: Elections Newfoundland and Labrador

2003 Newfoundland and Labrador general election
Party	Candidate	Votes	%	±%
Progressive Conservative	Kevin O'Brien	3,621	61.38	+14.06
Liberal	Diane Crewe	1,930	32.72	-16.84
New Democratic	Steve Johnson	348	5.90	+2.78
Total valid votes		5,899	99.88	–
Total rejected ballots		7	0.12	–
Turnout		5,906	58.51	-1.18
Eligible voters		10,094		
Progressive Conservative gain from Liberal		Swing		+15.45
Source: Elections Newfoundland and Labrador

1999 Newfoundland and Labrador general election
Party	Candidate	Votes	%	±%
Liberal	Sandra Kelly	3,064	49.56	-6.24
Progressive Conservative	Kevin O'Brien	2,926	47.32	+3.12
New Democratic	Roy Locke	193	3.12	+3.12
Total valid votes		6,183	99.84	–
Total rejected ballots		10	0.16	–
Turnout		6,193	59.69	-10.02
Eligible voters		10,375		
Liberal hold		Swing		-4.68
Source: Elections Newfoundland and Labrador

1996 Newfoundland and Labrador general election
Party	Candidate	Votes	%	±%
Liberal	Sandra Kelly	3,585	55.80	+7.99
Progressive Conservative	Dan Crummell	2,840	44.20	-2.70
Total valid votes		6,425	99.60	–
Total rejected ballots		26	0.40	–
Turnout		6,451	69.71	+12.40
Eligible voters		9,254		
Liberal hold		Swing		+5.35
Source: Elections Newfoundland and Labrador

Newfoundland and Labrador provincial by-election, October 10, 1995 upon the resignation of Winston Baker
Party	Candidate	Votes	%	±%
Liberal	Gary Vey	2,421	47.81	-15.59
Progressive Conservative	Dan Crummell	2,375	46.90	+19.85
New Democratic	Roy Locke	268	5.29	-4.26
Total valid votes		5,064	99.90	–
Total rejected ballots		5	0.10	–
Turnout		5,069	57.31	-3.52
Eligible voters		8,845		
Liberal hold		Swing		-17.72
Source: Elections Newfoundland and Labrador

1993 Newfoundland and Labrador general election
Party	Candidate	Votes	%	±%
Liberal	Winston Baker	3,876	63.40	+2.74
Progressive Conservative	John Elliott	1,654	27.05	-8.52
New Democratic	Roy Locke	584	9.55	+5.78
Total valid votes		6,114	99.69	–
Total rejected ballots		19	0.31	–
Turnout		6,133	60.83	-15.37
Eligible voters		10,082		
Liberal hold		Swing		+5.63
Source: Elections Newfoundland and Labrador

1989 Newfoundland and Labrador general election
Party	Candidate	Votes	%	±%
Liberal	Winston Baker	3,460	60.66	+4.28
Progressive Conservative	Agnes Richard	2,029	35.57	-3.94
New Democratic	Claude Elliott	215	3.77	-0.34
Total valid votes		5,704	99.74	–
Total rejected ballots		15	0.26	–
Turnout		5,719	76.20	-1.05
Eligible voters		7,505		
Liberal hold		Swing		+4.11
Source: Elections Newfoundland and Labrador

1985 Newfoundland and Labrador general election
Party	Candidate	Votes	%	±%
Liberal	Winston Baker	3,309	56.38	+19.33
Progressive Conservative	Hazel Newhook	2,319	39.51	-18.24
New Democratic	G. Joe Tremblett	241	4.11	-1.09
Total valid votes		5,869	99.81	–
Total rejected ballots		11	0.19	–
Turnout		5,880	77.25	+2.49
Eligible voters		7,612		
Liberal gain from Progressive Conservative		Swing		+18.79
Source: Elections Newfoundland and Labrador

1982 Newfoundland and Labrador general election
Party	Candidate	Votes	%	±%
Progressive Conservative	Hazel Newhook	2,876	57.75	+10.30
Liberal	Winston Baker	1,845	37.05	+15.88
New Democratic	Lowell Paulson	259	5.20	-26.18
Total valid votes		4,980	99.82	–
Total rejected ballots		9	0.18	–
Turnout		4,989	74.76	+0.04
Eligible voters		6,673		
Progressive Conservative hold		Swing		+13.09
Source: Elections Newfoundland and Labrador

1979 Newfoundland and Labrador general election
Party	Candidate	Votes	%	±%
Progressive Conservative	Hazel Newhook	2,362	47.45	-9.62
New Democratic	Winston Baker	1,564	31.38	+31.38
Liberal	Randy Simms	1,054	21.17	-21.76
Total valid votes		4,978	99.84	–
Total rejected ballots		8	0.16	–
Turnout		4,986	74.72	-2.20
Eligible voters		6,673		
Progressive Conservative hold		Swing		-20.50
Source: Elections Newfoundland and Labrador

1975 Newfoundland general election
Party	Candidate	Votes	%	±%
Progressive Conservative	Harold Collins	2,462	57.07	-8.55
Liberal	Averill Baker	1,852	42.93	+11.03
Total valid votes		4,314	99.91	–
Total rejected ballots		4	0.09	–
Turnout		4,318	76.92	-0.67
Eligible voters		5,614		
Progressive Conservative hold		Swing		-9.79
Source: Elections Newfoundland and Labrador

1972 Newfoundland general election
Party	Candidate	Votes	%	±%
Progressive Conservative	Harold Collins	4,674	65.62	–
Liberal	Eli Baker	2,272	31.90	–
New Democratic	Earl Reginald Boone	177	2.48	–
Total valid votes		7,123	99.35	–
Total rejected ballots		26	0.65	–
Turnout		7,149	77.59	
Eligible voters		9,214		
Progressive Conservative hold		Swing		–
Source: Elections Newfoundland and Labrador

== See also ==
- List of Newfoundland and Labrador provincial electoral districts
- Canadian provincial electoral districts
