= Stephen Mulrooney =

Canadian politician

Member of the Newfoundland and Labrador House of Assembly for Exploits
- In office 1975–1976
- Succeeded by: Hugh Twomey

Personal details
- Party: Liberal Party of Newfoundland and Labrador

Stephen J. Mulrooney is a former Canadian politician who was elected to the Newfoundland and Labrador House of Assembly in the 1975 provincial election. He represented the electoral district of Exploits as a member of the Liberal Party of Newfoundland and Labrador. He beat Progressive Conservative Hugh Twomey by nine votes, and the election results were later challenged in court and nullified. Twomey then defeated Mulooney in the ensuing by-election with 2,848 votes to Mulrooney's 2,197.
