= Pleasantview, Newfoundland and Labrador =

Pleasantview
- Local service district / designated place
- Location of Pleasantview Pleasantview (Canada)
- Coordinates: 49.361°N 55.34°W
- Country: Canada
- Province: Newfoundland and Labrador
- Region: Newfoundland
- Census division: 8
- Census subdivision: E

Government
  - Type: Unincorporated

Area
  - Land: 4.8 km^{2} (1.9 sq mi)

Population (2016)
  - Total: 43
- Time zone: UTC−03:30 (NST)
  - Summer (DST): UTC−02:30 (NDT)
- Area code: 709

Pleasantview is a local service district and designated place in the Canadian province of Newfoundland and Labrador.

== Geography ==
Pleasantview is in Newfoundland within Subdivision E of Division No. 8.

== Demographics ==
As a designated place in the 2016 Census of Population conducted by Statistics Canada, Pleasantview recorded a population of 43 living in 23 of its 79 total private dwellings, a change of −12.2% from its 2011 population of 49. With a land area of 4.8 km^{2} (1.9 sq mi), it had a population density of 9.0/km^{2} (23.2/sq mi) in 2016.

== Government ==
Pleasantview is a local service district (LSD) that is governed by a committee responsible for the provision of certain services to the community. The chair of the LSD committee is Calvin Warford.

== See also ==
- List of communities in Newfoundland and Labrador
- List of designated places in Newfoundland and Labrador
- List of local service districts in Newfoundland and Labrador
