= Jack Winsor =

Canadian politician

Member of the Newfoundland and Labrador House of Assembly for Fortune-Hermitage
- In office 1975–1979
- Succeeded by: Don Stewart

Personal details
- Party: Liberal Party of Newfoundland and Labrador

C. Jack Winsor is a former Canadian politician who was elected to the Newfoundland and Labrador House of Assembly in the 1975 provincial election. He represented the electoral district of Fortune-Hermitage as a member of the Liberal Party of Newfoundland and Labrador. He lived in Gaultois, Newfoundland and Labrador.
