= Moore's Cove =

Locality in Newfoundland and Labrador, Canada

Coordinates: 49.495°N 55.273°W

Location of Moore's Cove in Newfoundland and Labrador

Moore's Cove is a locality in the Canadian province of Newfoundland and Labrador.
