= Hazel McIsaac =

Canadian politician (1933–2012)

Hazel McIsaac MHA

Member of the Newfoundland House of Assembly for St. George's
- In office September 16, 1975 – June 18, 1979
- Preceded by: Alexander Dunphy
- Succeeded by: Ron Dawe

Personal details
- Born: Hazel Gillam; April 17, 1933 Robinsons, Newfoundland
- Died: December 14, 2012 (aged 79) Stephenville Crossing, Newfoundland and Labrador, Canada
- Party: Liberal
- Children: 2

Hazel A. McIsaac (April 17, 1933 – December 14, 2012) was a politician in Newfoundland and Labrador. She represented St. George's from 1975 to 1979 as a Liberal. McIsaac was the first woman elected to the assembly after Newfoundland entered the Canadian Confederation in 1949.

== Biography ==
She was born Hazel Gillam in Robinsons. McIsaac was elected for the District of St. George's as a Liberal in the 1975 general election. She was defeated when she ran for reelection in 1979. After leaving provincial politics, she served on the town council for St. George's.

McIsaac died at the age of 79 at the Bay St. George Long Term Care Centre after a ten-year battle with Alzheimer's disease.

== Legacy ==
The ferry MV Hazel McIsaac was named in her honour in 2011. The mid-sized passenger and car ferry provided service between Pilley's Island on one hand and Long Island and Little Bay Islands in Green Bay on the other hand. The residents of Little Bay Islands were relocated by the Newfoundland and Labrador provincial government on December 31, 2019, and ferry service was discontinued. The ferry service between Pilley's Island and Long Island stayed operational however.
