= Philips Head, Newfoundland and Labrador =

Coordinates: 49.226°N 55.304°W

Philips Head
- Local service district / designated place
- Interactive map of Philips Head
- Country: Canada
- Province: Newfoundland and Labrador
- Time zone: UTC-3:30 (Newfoundland Time)
  - Summer (DST): UTC-2:30 (Newfoundland Daylight)
- Area code: 709
- Highways: Route 352

Philips Head, or Phillips Head, is a local service district and designated place in the Canadian province of Newfoundland and Labrador. It is in the north-central portion of the island of Newfoundland. It is in the Bay of Exploits, west of Lewisporte and north of Botwood.

== History ==
The post office was established on February 3, 1958. The first postmistress was Doris Jessie March. Located within the community are the remains of an old World War II gun battery and shelter, sans artillery, as well as an old watch tower and fuel tank.

The artillery station constructed at Phillip's Head was elaborate in scope. It boasted a three-storey lookout tower and a 700-foot underground passage that connected 11 rooms filled with ammunition, secret documents and supplies. The entire station was surrounded by barbed wire fencing and fitted with drain pipes intended to flood the facility in the event of enemy invasion. Booby traps were also set up along the underground passage and two hidden escape hatches were installed.

== Geography ==
Phillips Head is in Newfoundland within Subdivision E of Division No. 8.

== Demographics ==
As a designated place in the 2016 Census of Population conducted by Statistics Canada, Phillips Head recorded a population of 151 living in 65 of its 104 total private dwellings, a change of −6.8% from its 2011 population of 162. With a land area of 3.58 km^{2} (1.38 sq mi), it had a population density of 42.2/km^{2} (109.2/sq mi) in 2016.

== Government ==
Phillips Head is a local service district (LSD) that is governed by a committee responsible for the provision of certain services to the community. The chair of the LSD committee is Reg Stride.

== See also ==
- List of communities in Newfoundland and Labrador
- List of designated places in Newfoundland and Labrador
- List of local service districts in Newfoundland and Labrador
