= James Reid (Newfoundland politician) =

Canadian politician

Minister of Rural Development
- In office April 2, 1973 – October 10, 1975
- Preceded by: Office Established
- Succeeded by: John Lundrigan

Member of the House of Assembly for Trinity-Bay de Verde
- In office 1972-1975
- Preceded by: Rupert Bartlett
- Succeeded by: Frederick Rowe
- In office 1982-1989
- Preceded by: Frederick Rowe
- Succeeded by: Lloyd Snow

Minister of community and Social Development
- In office December 1, 1972-April 2, 1973
- Preceded by: Aubrey Senior
- Succeeded by: Office Abolished

Personal details
- Born: 1921 Heart's Delight, Dominion of Newfoundland
- Died: 1991 (aged 69–70)
- Party: Progressive Conservative
- Parent: F.E. Reid (father)
- Occupation: businessman

Military service
- Allegiance: United Kingdom
- Branch/service: Royal Air Force
- Battles/wars: Second World War

James Gordon Bartlett Reid (1921–1991) was a businessman and politician in Newfoundland. He represented Trinity-Bay de Verde in the Newfoundland House of Assembly from 1972 to 1975 and from 1982 to 1989.

== Early life ==
The son of F.E. Reid, he was born in Heart's Delight and was educated there.

== Military career ==
Reid served in the Royal Air Force during the Second World War.

== Business career ==
After the war, he established several businesses in the Heart's Delight area, including a construction and heavy equipment company.

== Political career ==
Reid became the first mayor of Heart's Delight-Islington in 1972.

He was elected to the provincial assembly in 1972 and served in the Newfoundland cabinet as Minister of Community and Social Development. Reid was defeated when he ran for reelection in 1975; he was reelected in 1982 and 1985. He did not run for reelection in 1989 due to poor health.
