= Frederick B. Rowe =

Canadian politician (1937–2021)

Frederick Rowe

Member of the House of Assembly for Trinity-Bay de Verde
- In office 1975 - 1982
- Preceded by: James Reid
- Succeeded by: James Reid

Member of the House of Assembly for St. Barbe North
- In office 1972 - 1975
- Preceded by: James Chalker
- Succeeded by: Edward Maynard as MHA for St. Barbe

Personal details
- Born: August 20, 1937 Wesleyville, Dominion of Newfoundland
- Died: November 19, 2021 (aged 84)
- Party: Liberal
- Spouse: Sandra Maude Butler
- Parents: Frederick William Rowe (father); Edith Laura Butt (mother)
- Education: Memorial University; Columbia University
- Occupation: politician

Frederick Butt Rowe (August 20, 1937 – November 19, 2021) was a Canadian politician who represented St. Barbe North from 1972 to 1975 and Trinity-Bay de Verde from 1975 to 1982 in the Newfoundland House of Assembly.

The son of Frederick William Rowe and Edith Laura Butt, he was born in Wesleyville and was educated at the Curtis Academy in St. John's, at Memorial University and at Columbia University. In 1960, Rowe married Sandra Maude Butler.

Rowe died on November 19, 2021, at the age of 84.
