= Peterview =

Peterview, Newfoundland & Labrador Peters Arm
- Town
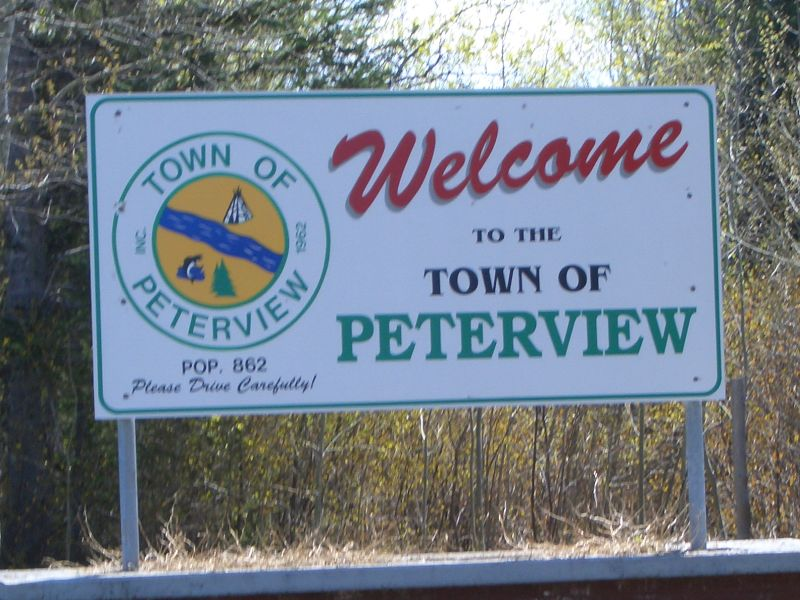
- Peterview's welcome sign on the only road into the community.

- Seal

- Location of Peterview in Newfoundland
- Coordinates: 49°8′55″N 55°21′02″W
- Country: Canada
- Province: Newfoundland and Labrador
- Census division: 6
- Incorporated: 1962

Government

Area
  - Total: 6.72 km^{2} (2.59 sq mi)
- Elevation: 12 m (39 ft)

Population (2021)
  - Total: 723
  - Density: 123.2/km^{2} (319/sq mi)
- Time zone: UTC-3:30 (Newfoundland Time)
  - Summer (DST): UTC-2:30 (Newfoundland Daylight)
- Postal code span: A0H
- Area code: 709
- Highways: Route 350
- Website: https://www.peterview.ca/

Peterview is a town located in the Exploits Valley area of central Newfoundland and Labrador, Canada, where Peters River empties into the Bay of Exploits, just south of Botwood, off Route 350.

Originally named Peters Arm, the community was incorporated as the Town of Peterview in 1962. The mayor is Corey Samson and the deputy mayor is Keith Humber. According to the 2001 Statistics Canada census, Peterview has a population of 807 with 266 private dwellings.

Peterview has connections to Demasduit, also known as Mary March, a figure in Newfoundland history and one of the last Beothuks, as John Peyton, one of her captors, built the first house in the area.

== Demographics ==
In the 2021 Census of Population conducted by Statistics Canada, Peterview had a population of 723 living in 279 of its 288 total private dwellings, a change of −12.7% from its 2016 population of 828. With a land area of 6.34 km^{2} (2.45 sq mi), it had a population density of 114.0/km^{2} (295.4/sq mi) in 2021.

== See also ==
- List of cities and towns in Newfoundland and Labrador
