= Kevin O'Brien (Newfoundland and Labrador politician) =

Canadian politician (born 1956)

The Honourable Kevin O'Brien
- ECNL

Minister of Municipal Affairs, Minister Responsible for Emergency preparedness, Minister Responsible for fire and Emergency services NL, And Registrar General of Newfoundland and Labrador
- In office 2010–2013
- Preceded by: Dianne Whalen
- Succeeded by: Steve Kent

Minister of Advance Education and Skills, Minister Responsible for the NL Housing Corporation, And Minister Responsible for the status of persons with Disabilities
- In office October 9, 2013 – July 3, 2015
- Preceded by: Joan Shea
- Succeeded by: Gerry Byrne

Member of the Newfoundland and Labrador House of Assembly for Gander
- In office 2003 – July 3, 2015
- Preceded by: Sandra Kelly
- Succeeded by: John Haggie

Minister of Government Services, And Minister Responsible for the Government Purchasing Agency of Newfoundland and Labrador
- In office 2007–2010
- Preceded by: Dianne Whalen
- Succeeded by: Harry Harding

Minister of Business of Newfoundland and Labrador
- In office July 5, 2006 – October 29, 2007
- Preceded by: Danny Williams
- Succeeded by: Paul Oram

Personal details
- Born: August 25, 1956 (age 70) Ferryland, Newfoundland and Labrador, Canada
- Party: Progressive Conservative
- Occupation: Pharmacist, Businessman

Kevin George O'Brien (born August 25, 1956) is a Canadian businessman, pharmacist and politician in Newfoundland and Labrador, Canada. He served as the province's Minister of Advanced Education and Skills. O'Brien was elected to the Newfoundland and Labrador House of Assembly as a member of the Progressive Conservative Party (PC) in 2003, representing the district of Gander until his resignation in 2015. He resigned his provincial seat on July 3, 2015 to run federally in the 2015 federal election.

== Politics ==
O'Brien was elected to the Newfoundland and Labrador House of Assembly as a member of the Progressive Conservative Party in 2003 representing the district of Gander. He was appointed to Cabinet in July 2006, becoming the Minister of Business. Following his re-election in 2007, O'Brien was shuffled into the portfolio of Government Services. With the death of fellow Municipal Affairs Minister Dianne Whalen in October 2010 O'Brien was shuffled out of the Government Services portfolio and into Municipal Affairs.

In September 2013, O'Brien was accused by the Gander Chamber of Commerce of threatening to slow down the construction of a new school in Gander if NDP representatives were allowed to be present at a community breakfast. The Chamber of Commerce also alleged that O'Brien had made similar threats in the past. O'Brien denied the allegations.

On October 9, 2013, O'Brien was shuffled to Minister of Advanced Education. In March 2015, O'Brien resigned from cabinet.

In July 2015, O'Brien resigned his provincial seat to run for the federal Conservative party in the riding of Coast of Bays—Central—Notre Dame in the 2015 federal election. On October 19, 2015, O'Brien was defeated in the federal election by Liberal incumbent Scott Simms.

== Electoral record ==
2015 Canadian federal election: Coast of Bays—Central—Notre Dame
Party	Candidate	Votes	%	±%	Expenditures
Liberal	Scott Simms	26,523	74.82	+19.90	$53,460.35
Conservative	Kevin O'Brien	6,479	18.28	–12.04	$151,187.70
New Democratic	Claudette Menchenton	2,175	6.14	–7.49	$3,416.01
Green	Elizabeth Perry	271	0.76	–0.12	–
Total valid votes/expense limit		35,448	99.59		$238,355.39
Total rejected ballots		145	0.41	–	
Turnout		35,593	55.71	–	
Eligible voters		63,891			
Liberal notional hold		Swing		+15.97	
Source: Elections Canada

2011 Newfoundland and Labrador general election
Party	Candidate	Votes	%	±%
Progressive Conservative	Kevin O'Brien	2393	52.27%	–
Liberal	Barry Warren	1415	30.91%	
NDP	Lukas Norman	770	16.82%	

2007 Newfoundland and Labrador general election
Party	Candidate	Votes	%	±%
Progressive Conservative	Kevin O'Brien	3599	75.1%	+13.2%
Liberal	Stephanie Winsor	1193	24.9%	+8.2%

2003 Newfoundland and Labrador general election
Party	Candidate	Votes	%	±%
Progressive Conservative	Kevin O'Brien	3621	61.38	–
Liberal	Dianne Crewe	1930	32.71	
NDP	Steve Johnson	348	5.89	

1999 Newfoundland and Labrador general election
Party	Candidate	Votes	%	±%
Liberal	Sandra Kelly	3,064	49.5%	
Progressive Conservative	Kevin O'Brien	2,926	47.2%	–
NDP	Roy Locke	193	3.1%	
