= St. John's West (federal electoral district) =

Former federal electoral district in Newfoundland and Labrador, Canada

Newfoundland and Labrador electoral district

Defunct federal electoral district
- Legislature: House of Commons
- District created: 1949
- District abolished: 2003
- First contested: 1949
- Last contested: 2000

St. John's West was a federal electoral district in Newfoundland and Labrador, Canada, represented in the House of Commons of Canada from 1949 to 2004. This riding was created in 1949 when Newfoundland joined the Canadian Confederation. It was abolished in 2003 when redistributed into Avalon and St. John's South—Mount Pearl ridings.

The riding initially consisted of the Districts of Placentia-St. Mary's and Ferryland and a part of St. John's. In 1952, it was redefined to include the Iona Islands in the District of Placentia West. In 1966, it was redefined to consist of the provincial districts of St. John's South, Ferryland, St. Mary's and Placentia East, and those parts of the provincial districts of St. John's West, St. John's North and St. John's Centre not included in the electoral district of St. John's East.

== Members of Parliament ==
This riding elected the following members of Parliament:

Parliament	Years	Member	Party
St. John's West
21st	1949–1953	William Joseph Browne	Progressive Conservative
22nd	1953–1957	James Augustine Power	Liberal
23rd	1957–1958	William Joseph Browne	Progressive Conservative
24th	1958–1962	William Joseph Browne	Progressive Conservative
25th	1962–1963	Richard Cashin	Liberal
26th	1963–1965	Richard Cashin	Liberal
27th	1965–1968	Richard Cashin	Liberal
28th	1968–1972	Walter C. Carter	Progressive Conservative
29th	1972–1974	Walter C. Carter	Progressive Conservative
30th	1974–1975	Walter C. Carter	Progressive Conservative
30th	1976–1979	John Crosbie	Progressive Conservative
31st	1979–1980	John Crosbie	Progressive Conservative
32nd	1980–1984	John Crosbie	Progressive Conservative
33rd	1984–1988	John Crosbie	Progressive Conservative
34th	1988–1993	John Crosbie	Progressive Conservative
35th	1993–1997	Jean Payne	Liberal
36th	1997–2000	Charlie Power	Progressive Conservative
36th	2000–2000	Loyola Hearn	Progressive Conservative
37th	2000–2003	Loyola Hearn	Progressive Conservative
37th	2003–2004	Loyola Hearn	Conservative
Riding dissolved into Avalon and St. John's South

== Election results ==
1949 Canadian federal election
Party	Candidate	Votes
Progressive Conservative	William Joseph Browne	10,344
Liberal	Greg Power	9,828

1953 Canadian federal election
Party	Candidate	Votes
Liberal	James Augustine Power	9,965
Progressive Conservative	William Joseph Browne	9,025

1957 Canadian federal election
Party	Candidate	Votes
Progressive Conservative	William Joseph Browne	10,539
Liberal	James Augustine Power	8,449
Co-operative Commonwealth	E.E. Thoms	321

1958 Canadian federal election
Party	Candidate	Votes
Progressive Conservative	William Joseph Browne	15,953
Liberal	Leonard Miller	10,338
Co-operative Commonwealth	E.E. Thoms	240

1962 Canadian federal election
Party	Candidate	Votes
Liberal	Richard Cashin	12,650
Progressive Conservative	William J. Browne	12,626
New Democratic	Stanley H. Ross	281

1963 Canadian federal election
Party	Candidate	Votes
Liberal	Richard Cashin	14,724
Progressive Conservative	Art Harnett	10,997
New Democratic	James J. Walsh	466

1965 Canadian federal election
Party	Candidate	Votes
Liberal	Richard Cashin	14,481
Progressive Conservative	Gerald Ryan Ottenheimer	10,054
New Democratic	Esau E. Thoms	580
Social Credit	S. Carey Skinner	115

1968 Canadian federal election
Party	Candidate	Votes
Progressive Conservative	Walter Carter	15,379
Liberal	Richard Cashin	11,150
New Democratic	John Lorne Connors	597

1972 Canadian federal election
Party	Candidate	Votes
Progressive Conservative	Walter Carter	16,818
Liberal	David Bruce Porter	7,230
New Democratic	Moses L. Ingram	1,668
Independent	Hugh J. Shea	1,637

1974 Canadian federal election
Party	Candidate	Votes
Progressive Conservative	Walter Carter	14,550
Liberal	Lilian Bouzane	8,864
New Democratic	Walter Noel	3,415
Social Credit	S. Carey Skinner	143

By-election on 18 October 1976 On Mr. Carter's resignation, 3 September 1975
Party	Candidate	Votes
Progressive Conservative	John Crosbie	11,719
New Democratic	Tom Mayo	8,597
Liberal	Robert Innes	3,971

1979 Canadian federal election
Party	Candidate	Votes
Progressive Conservative	John Crosbie	17,236
Liberal	Patrick O'Flaherty	10,024
New Democratic	Tom Mayo	9,033

1980 Canadian federal election
Party	Candidate	Votes
Progressive Conservative	John Crosbie	19,067
Liberal	Aidan Hennebury	11,423
New Democratic	J. Michael Maher	3,967
Marxist–Leninist	Tony Seed	86

1984 Canadian federal election
Party	Candidate	Votes
Progressive Conservative	John Crosbie	33,696
Liberal	Walter Carter	8,699
New Democratic	Nina P. Patey	1,926

1988 Canadian federal election
Party	Candidate	Votes
Progressive Conservative	John Crosbie	24,194
Liberal	Genevieve M. Payne	12,787
New Democratic	Alfred J. Sullivan	2,333

1993 Canadian federal election
Party	Candidate	Votes
Liberal	Jean Payne	24,021
Progressive Conservative	Loyola Hearn	16,380
New Democratic	Sharon Walsh	1,740
Reform	Dana Tucker	1,041
Natural Law	Guy Harvey	459

1997 Canadian federal election
Party	Candidate	Votes
Progressive Conservative	Charlie Power	19,393
Liberal	Rex Gibbons	16,317
New Democratic	Lee Ingram	6,866
Reform	Harold Silas Ruby	1,113
Natural Law	Michael Rendell	319

By-election on 15 May 2000 Resignation of Charles J. Power, 31 January 2000
Party	Candidate	Votes
Progressive Conservative	Loyola Hearn	11,392
New Democratic	Greg Malone	11,036
Liberal	Anthony G. Sparrow	8,032
Alliance	Frank Hall	1,315
Independent (Extreme Wrestling)	Ed Sailor White	332
Source: Elections Canada

2000 Canadian federal election
Party	Candidate	Votes
Progressive Conservative	Loyola Hearn	22,959
Liberal	Chuck Furey	14,137
New Democratic	Dave Curtis	4,744
Alliance	Eldon Drost	840
Natural Law	Michael Rendell	141

== See also ==
- List of Canadian electoral districts
- Historical federal electoral districts of Canada
