= Aubrey Senior =

Canadian politician

The Honourable Aubrey Senior ECNL

Minister of Community and Social Development
- In office January 18, 1972 – December 1, 1972
- Preceded by: Bill Rowe
- Succeeded by: Jim Reid

MHA for Grand Falls
- In office 1971–1975
- Preceded by: Frederick William Rowe
- Succeeded by: John Lundrigan

Personal details
- Born: March 2, 1936 (age 90) Flat Islands, Placentia Bay, Dominion of Newfoundland
- Party: Progressive Conservative Party of Newfoundland and Labrador
- Spouse: Jean
- Occupation: Chartered Financial Planner

Sheridan Aubrey John Senior (born March 2, 1936, in Port Elizabeth, Newfoundland) was a Canadian politician. He represented the electoral district of Grand Falls in the Newfoundland and Labrador House of Assembly from 1971 to 1975. He was a member of the Progressive Conservative Party of Newfoundland and Labrador, was appointed Minister of Community and Social Development and served as Provincial Director of the Progressive Conservative Party. Before politics, he was a school teacher, proprietor of "Trader John" Wholesale and Retail. After politics, he worked in the financial services industry and received the Chartered Financial Planner (CFP) designation. He had two children: Sheridan Paul Senior and Jason Craig Senior. He plays guitar, organ, piano, and the accordion. Since retirement, he and his wife dedicate their time to entertaining senior citizens and others with live musical performances.
