= Northern Arm =

- Town
- Interactive map of Northern Arm
- Coordinates: 49°11′10″N 55°23′11″W
- Country: Canada
- Province: Newfoundland and Labrador

Government
  - Type: Mayor

Population (2021)
  - Total: 371
- Time zone: UTC-3:30 (Newfoundland Time)
  - Summer (DST): UTC-2:30 (Newfoundland Daylight)
- RR: A0H 1E0
- Area code: 709
- Highways: Route 350; Route 352

Northern Arm is a town in the Canadian province of Newfoundland and Labrador. The town had a population of 371 in the Canada 2021 Census.

In the 2021 Census of Population conducted by Statistics Canada, Northern Arm had a population of 371 living in 166 of its 213 total private dwellings, a change of −12.9% from its 2016 population of 426. With a land area of 24.94 km^{2} (9.63 sq mi), it had a population density of 14.9/km^{2} (38.5/sq mi) in 2021.

== See also ==
- List of cities and towns in Newfoundland and Labrador
