= Cottrell's Cove =

Place in Newfoundland and Labrador, Canada

Coordinates: 49.491°N 55.284°W

Location of Cottrell's Cove in Newfoundland and Labrador

Cottrell's Cove (/ˈkɒtrɛlz/ KOT-relz) is a local service district and designated place in the Canadian province of Newfoundland and Labrador.

== Geography ==
Cottrell's Cove is in Newfoundland within Subdivision E of Division No. 8.

== Demographics ==
As a designated place in the 2016 Census of Population conducted by Statistics Canada, Cottrell's Cove recorded a population of 123 living in 63 of its 111 total private dwellings, a change of -14.6% from its 2011 population of 144. With a land area of 37.18 km^{2} (14.36 sq mi), it had a population density of 3.3/km^{2} (8.6/sq mi) in 2016.

== Government ==
Cottrell's Cove is a local service district (LSD) that is governed by a committee responsible for the provision of certain services to the community. The chair of the LSD committee is John B Boone.

== See also ==
- List of communities in Newfoundland and Labrador
- List of designated places in Newfoundland and Labrador
- List of local service districts in Newfoundland and Labrador
