= Hugh Twomey =

Canadian politician (1920–1989)

Hugh M. Twomey

MHA for Exploits
- In office 1976–1989
- Preceded by: Stephen Mulrooney
- Succeeded by: Roger Grimes

Personal details
- Born: September 26, 1920 County Cork, Ireland
- Died: August 2, 1989 (aged 68) Botwood, Newfoundland and Labrador, Canada
- Party: Progressive Conservative Party of Newfoundland and Labrador
- Occupation: doctor, medical officer

Hugh Matthew Twomey (September 26, 1920 – August 2, 1989) was a Canadian physician and politician. He represented the electoral district of Exploits in the Newfoundland and Labrador House of Assembly from 1976 to 1989 as a member of the Progressive Conservative Party of Newfoundland and Labrador.

The son of John Michael Tworney and Christina Golden, he was born in Cork, Ireland, and was educated at the Royal College of Surgeons in Dublin. He came to Newfoundland in 1947 as medical officer on the hospital ship MV Lady Anderson. Twomey next worked at the Harbour Breton Cottage Hospital and then was medical superintendent for the Botwood hospital from 1949 until his retirement in 1984. He was president of the Newfoundland Medical Association and the Central Newfoundland Medical Society. He was also assistant professor of clinical medicine at Memorial University. Twomey married Mary Carmel Stuewe.

Twomey was first elected to the Newfoundland assembly in 1975. He served stints as Minister of Health (1984 to 1988) and as Minister of Public Works and Services (1988 to 1989). He died of an illness shortly after retiring from the legislature, in 1989.

The chronic care facility that he built to replace the Botwood hospital was later renamed the Dr. Hugh Twomey Health Centre.
