= Charlie Power (politician) =

Canadian politician

The Honourable Charlie Power ECNL

Member of the Canadian Parliament for St. John's West
- In office 1997 – 31 January 2000
- Preceded by: Jean Payne
- Succeeded by: Loyola Hearn

Member of the Newfoundland and Labrador House of Assembly for Ferryland
- In office 1977–1992
- Preceded by: Martin O'Brien
- Succeeded by: Loyola Sullivan
- In office 1975–1976
- Preceded by: Thomas Doyle
- Succeeded by: Martin O'Brien

Personal details
- Born: 29 February 1948 (age 78) Tors Cove, Dominion of Newfoundland
- Party: Progressive Conservative
- Profession: teacher

Charles J. Power (born 29 February 1948) was a member of the House of Commons of Canada from 1997 to 2000. By career, he was a teacher.

From the 1975 to 1992 he was a Member of the Newfoundland and Labrador House of Assembly for Ferryland.

Charlie Power won the St. John's West electoral district for the Progressive Conservative party during the 1997 general election. He resigned his House of Commons seat on 31 January 2000 before the end of the 36th Canadian Parliament ostensibly for personal reasons.
