= Ray Winsor =

Canadian politician

Ramon Vere "Ray" Winsor (August 19, 1933 – January 16, 2006) was a dentist and politician in Newfoundland. He represented Mount Scio from 1975 to 1979 in the Newfoundland House of Assembly.

The son of John Wilfred Winsor and Elizabeth Hollett, he was born in St. John's and was educated at Memorial University and Dalhousie University. In 1957, he married Marie Lane. Winsor was chief of the Dentistry department at the Janeway Children's Health and Rehabilitation Centre.

He was elected to the Newfoundland assembly in 1975, serving one term. Winsor served as chair of the Public Accounts Committee and the Government caucus.
