= William J. MacNeil =

Canadian businessman and politician

William Joseph MacNeil (born July 27, 1946) is a real estate agent and former politician in Newfoundland. He represented Stephenville in the Newfoundland House of Assembly from 1975 to 1979.

The son of Neil Joseph MacNeil and Annetta Gallant, he was born in Stephenville and was educated in St. Stephen's and at Memorial University.

MacNeil was elected to the Newfoundland assembly in 1975.
