= Leading Tickles =

Coordinates: 49.500°N 55.400°W

- Town
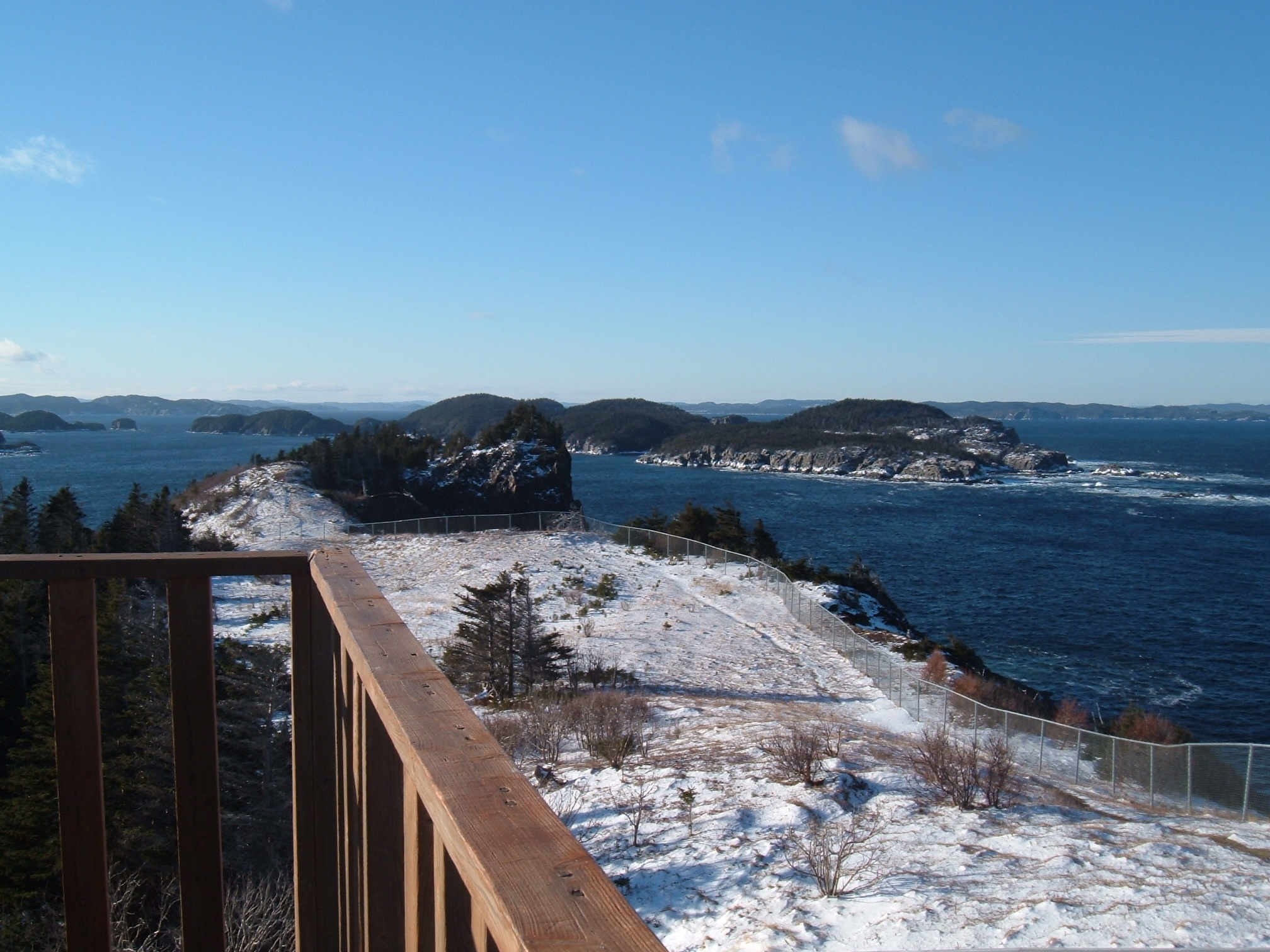
- View of the small islands from the top of a lookout point at Leading Tickles
- Interactive map of Leading Tickles
- Country: Canada
- Province: Newfoundland and Labrador

Population (2021)
  - Total: 296
- Time zone: UTC-3:30 (Newfoundland Time)
  - Summer (DST): UTC-2:30 (Newfoundland Daylight)
- Area code: 709
- Highways: Route 350

Leading Tickles is a town in the Canadian province of Newfoundland and Labrador. In 2021, the town had a population of 296, down from 407 in the Canada 2006 Consus. It is located approximately 25 km Northwest of Point Leamington on the shores of Notre Dame Bay. The town has notable scenery, especially in spring and early summer when many icebergs pass just off the coast.

== Demographics ==
In the 2021 Consus of Population conducted by Statistics Canada, Leading Tickles had a population of 296 living in 138 of its 189 total private dwellings, a change of 1.4% from its 2016 population of 292. With a land area of 26.59 km^{2} (10.27 sq mi), it had a population density of 11.1/km^{2} (28.8/sq mi) in 2021.

== See also ==
- List of cities and towns in Newfoundland and Labrador
