= Point of Bay =

- Town
- Interactive map of Point of Bay
- Coordinates: 49°16′37″N 55°16′04″W
- Country: Canada
- Province: Newfoundland and Labrador

Population (2021)
  - Total: 137
- Time zone: UTC-3:30 (Newfoundland Time)
  - Summer (DST): UTC-2:30 (Newfoundland Daylight)
- Area code: 709
- Highways: Route 352

Point of Bay is a town in the Canadian province of Newfoundland and Labrador. The town had a population of 154 people in 2016, down from 163 in the Canada 2006 Census.

== Demographics ==
In the 2021 Census of Population conducted by Statistics Canada, Point of Bay had a population of 137 living in 67 of its 109 total private dwellings, a change of −11% from its 2016 population of 154. With a land area of 21.62 km^{2} (8.35 sq mi), it had a population density of 6.3/km^{2} (16.4/sq mi) in 2021.

== See also ==
- List of cities and towns in Newfoundland and Labrador
