= Harold Collins (Canadian politician) =

Canadian politician

MHA for Gander
- In office 1967–1979
- Preceded by: Charles Granger
- Succeeded by: Hazel Newhook

Personal details
- Born: May 21, 1925 Indian Islands, Notre Dame Bay, Dominion of Newfoundland
- Died: November 10, 2015 (aged 90) St. John's, Newfoundland and Labrador
- Party: Progressive Conservative Party of Newfoundland and Labrador

Harold Anthony Collins (May 21, 1925 – November 10, 2015) was a Canadian politician. He represented the electoral district of Gander in the Newfoundland and Labrador House of Assembly from 1967 to 1979. He was a member of the Progressive Conservative Party of Newfoundland and Labrador. Collins was born at Indian Islands, Newfoundland. He married Joan Peckford in 1949 and has ten children. Collins died in 2015 at the age of 90.
