= Edward Maynard (politician) =

Canadian politician

Edward Maynard (February 22, 1939 – July 16, 2004) was a businessperson and politician in Newfoundland. He represented St. Barbe South from 1971 to 1975 and St. Barbe from 1975 to 1979 in the Newfoundland House of Assembly.

The son of William Henry Maynard and Jane Mitchelmore, he was born in Green Island Brook in 1939 and was educated there and at Saint Bonaventure's College. He worked as a teacher, as a policeman, as an electronics technician and as a union organizer before entering politics. Maynard married Marlene Offery.

He was involved in municipal politics during the 1960s and was first elected to the Newfoundland assembly in 1971; during the course of a judicial recount after the election, it was discovered that the returning officer had destroyed 106 ballots. However, Maynard was declared elected by the Newfoundland Supreme Court, which put an end to Joey Smallwood's tenure as premier. He served in the provincial cabinet as Minister of Labour, Minister of Forestry and Agriculture, Minister of Manpower and Industrial Relations, Minister of Public Works and Services, Minister of Industrial Development, president of the Treasury Board and president of the executive council. Maynard ran unsuccessfully for the leadership of the Progressive Conservative Party in 1979. He was defeated when he ran for reelection later that year. From 1979 to 1989, he served as chair of the Workmen's Compensation Board. Maynard later worked as a management consultant.
