= Curling, Newfoundland and Labrador =

Coordinates: 48°57′33″N 57°59′52″W

Curling
- Neighbourhood
- Interactive map of Curling
- Country: Canada
- Province: Newfoundland and Labrador
- City: Corner Brook

Curling is a mainly residential neighbourhood of the city of Corner Brook, Newfoundland and Labrador. It is situated just west of the main part of the city. Located in the Humber Arm of the Bay of Islands, Curling was originally a fishing community. It is the oldest section of Corner Brook.

== History ==
James Cook, the famous British cartographer and explorer, was the first to survey and record the geography of the Bay of Islands. Throughout the summer of 1767, he surveyed most of the area. Copies of the maps he created are displayed at the Captain James Cook Monument in Corner Brook.

Curling used to be known as Birchy Cove; its name was changed in dedication of Rev. J.J. Curling. Curling used to have a hotel and a golf course. Oil tankers are currently in their place.

In 1956, Curling amalgamated with three other communities (Humbermouth, Townsite and Westside) on the south side of the Humber Arm to form the city of Corner Brook.

The Western Star, the main newspaper for the west coast of Newfoundland, was founded in Curling in 1900.

== Attractions ==
Bartlett's Point Park is a small day-park located on the waterfront, and features walking trails and a playground.

== Transportation ==
Part of Route 450 travels through Curling on O'Connell Drive before continuing on down the southern shore of the Humber Arm and Bay of Islands.

Curling is included in the Corner Brook Transit public bus service route. It also has its own taxi service, called Birchy Cabs.

== See also ==
- List of communities in Newfoundland and Labrador
- Corner Brook
