= Fortune Harbour =

Human settlement in Newfoundland and Labrador, Canada

Coordinates: 49°30′34″N 55°14′16″W

Location of Fortune Harbour in Newfoundland and Labrador

Fortune Harbour or Fortune Harbor is a designated place in the Canadian province of Newfoundland and Labrador.

== History ==
The 1913 McAlpine Gazetteer lists the community in Twillingate district:

"FORTUNE HARBOR, a post and money order settlement in Twillingate district. Contains postal telegraph, express, 1 store, 1 Catholic church, Bowring Bros. and Reid Nfld. steamers call during open navigation."

An 1884 pilot guide discusses "Fortune harbor" in Notre Dame Bay:

"Fortune harbor is a land-locked anchorage, situated 2 miles southeastward of Bagg head. Two entrances are formed by Sweeny island, that to the eastward of the island being only 30 yards wide and having a depth of 12 feet at low water. The western entrance is suitable for large vessels with a commanding breeze, but the turns are sharp, the wind is often baffling in the approach, and the squalls heavy, particularly with westerly winds.

== Geography ==
Fortune Harbour is in Newfoundland within Subdivision E of Division No. 8.

== Demographics ==
As a designated place in the 2016 Census of Population conducted by Statistics Canada, Fortune Harbour recorded a population of 78 living in 31 of its 90 total private dwellings, a change of -7.1% from its 2011 population of 84. With a land area of 11.11 km^{2} (4.29 sq mi), it had a population density of 7.0/km^{2} (18.2/sq mi) in 2016.

== See also ==
- List of communities in Newfoundland and Labrador
- List of designated places in Newfoundland and Labrador
