= Luke Woodrow =

Canadian politician

Luke Jerome Woodrow (1921 – August 19, 2000) was a Roman Catholic priest, realtor and politician in Newfoundland. He represented Bay of Islands in the Newfoundland House of Assembly from 1975 to 1985.

The son of Richard Woodrow and Mary Rice, he was born in Northern Bay and was educated at Laval University, Loyola College and St. Peter's Seminary in London, Ontario. Woodrow was ordained a Catholic priest in 1947. He served in parishes in Corner Brook, Harbour Breton and Benoit's Cove. He left the priesthood in 1969, going into business as a realtor. Woodrow married Bernice Boland.

From 1972 to 1975, he served on Corner Brook city council. Woodrow was elected to the Newfoundland assembly in 1975. He served as executive assistant to Frank Moores and Brian Peckford. In 1986, Woodrow was appointed to the board of directors for the Fishing Industry Advisory Board. He also served on the provincial executives for the CNIB and the Canadian Red Cross.

He died in Corner Brook at the age of 79.
