= Point Leamington =

Coordinates: 49.317°N 55.400°W

- Town
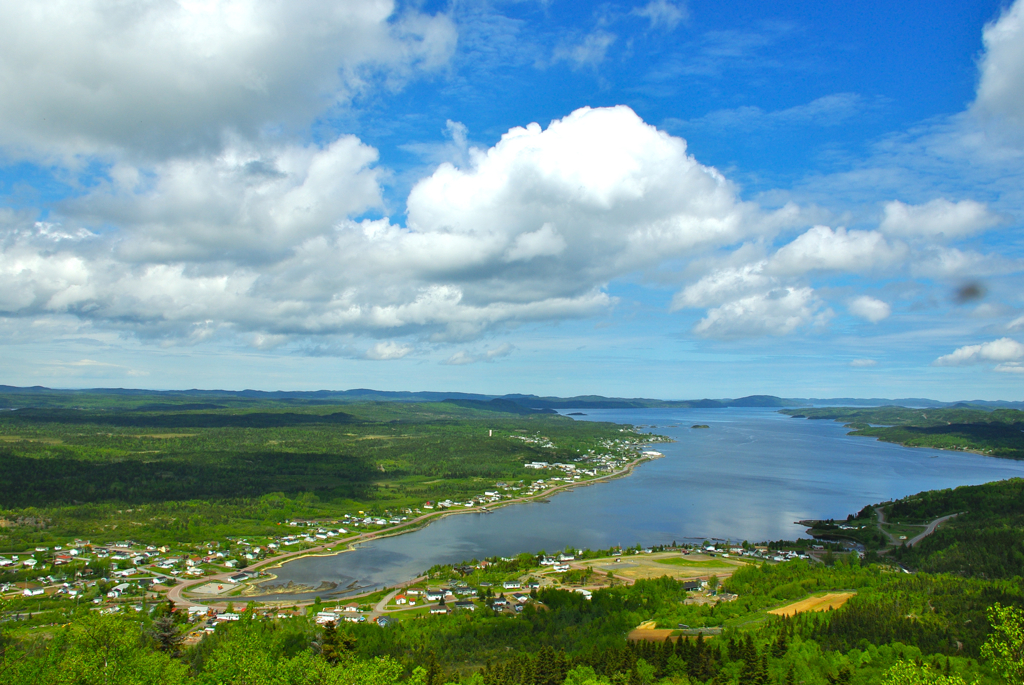
- Point Leamington from the top of Rowsell's Hill.
- Interactive map of Point Leamington
- Country: Canada
- Province: Newfoundland and Labrador
- Established: 1870

Government
- Elevation: 0 m (0 ft)

Population (2021)
  - Total: 574
- Time zone: UTC-3:30 (Newfoundland Time)
  - Summer (DST): UTC-2:30 (Newfoundland Daylight)
- Area code: 709
- Highways: Route 350

Point Leamington is a town of about 590 people located north of Botwood and Grand Falls-Windsor in the Canadian province of Newfoundland and Labrador.

== Demographics ==
In the 2021 Census of Population conducted by Statistics Canada, Point Leamington had a population of 574 living in 278 of its 341 total private dwellings, a change of −2.9% from its 2016 population of 591. With a land area of 26.8 km^{2} (10.3 sq mi), it had a population density of 21.4/km^{2} (55.5/sq mi) in 2021.
