= 42nd General Assembly of Newfoundland =

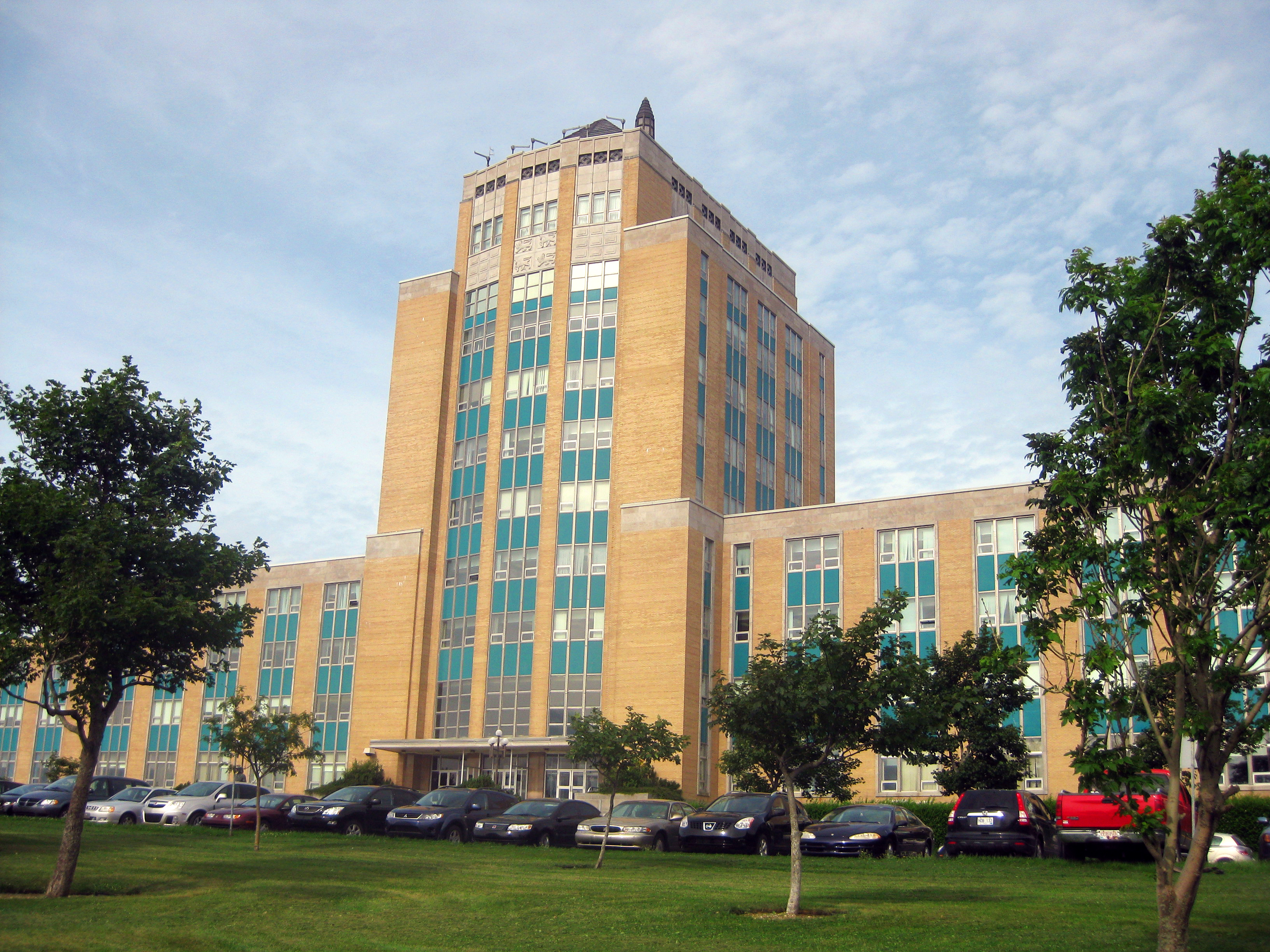
- Confederation Building East Block. Seat of the Newfoundland and Labrador government and the House of Assembly from 1960 to present.

History
- Founded: May 20, 1993
- Disbanded: January 29, 1996
- Preceded by: 41st General Assembly of Newfoundland
- Succeeded by: 43rd General Assembly of Newfoundland

Leadership
- Premier: Clyde Wells

Elections
- Last election: 1993 Newfoundland general election

The members of the 42nd General Assembly of Newfoundland were elected in the Newfoundland general election held in May 1993. The general assembly sat from May 20, 1993 to January 29, 1996.

The Liberal Party led by Clyde Wells formed the government.

Paul Dicks served as speaker until 1995. Lloyd Snow succeeded Dicks as speaker.

There were three sessions of the 42nd General Assembly:

Session	Start	End
1st	May 20, 1993	February 24, 1994
2nd	February 28, 1994	March 15, 1995
3rd	March 16, 1995	January 29, 1996

Frederick Russell served as lieutenant governor of Newfoundland.

== Members of the Assembly ==
The following members were elected to the assembly in 1993:

Member	Electoral district	Party	First elected / previously elected
Paul Shelley	Baie Verte-White Bay	Progressive Conservative	1993
Clyde Wells	Bay of Islands	Liberal	1966, (Note: Humber East) 1987, (Note: Windsor-Buchans) 1989
Percy Barrett	Bellevue	Liberal	1989
Tom Lush	Bonavista North	Liberal	1975, (Note: Terra Nova) 1985
Roger Fitzgerald	Bonavista South	Progressive Conservative	1993
Dave S. Gilbert	Burgeo-Bay d'Espoir	Liberal	1985
Glenn Tobin	Burin-Placentia West	Progressive Conservative	1982
Art Reid	Carbonear	Liberal	1989
Pat Cowan	Conception Bay South	Liberal	1989
Danny Dumaresque	Eagle River	Liberal	1989
Roger Grimes	Exploits	Liberal	1989
Loyola Sullivan	Ferryland	Progressive Conservative	1992
Beaton Tulk	Fogo	Liberal	1979, 1993
Oliver Langdon	Fortune-Hermitage	Liberal	1989 (Note: First Elected as a Progressive Conservative)
Winston Baker	Gander	Liberal	1985
Gary Vey (1995)	Gander	Liberal	1995
Bill Matthews	Grand Bank	Progressive Conservative	1982
Len Simms	Grand Falls	Progressive Conservative	1979
Mike Mackey (1995)	Grand Falls	Progressive Conservative	1995
Alvin Hewlett	Green Bay	Progressive Conservative	1989
John Crane	Harbour Grace	Liberal	1989
Don Whelan	Harbour Main	Liberal	1993
Lynn Verge	Humber East	Progressive Conservative	1979
Rick Woodford	Humber Valley	Progressive Conservative	1985
Paul Dicks	Humber West	Liberal	1989
Edward J. Byrne	Kilbride	Progressive Conservative	1993
Bill Ramsay	La Poile	Liberal	1989
Melvin Penney	Lewisporte	Liberal	1989
Alec Snow	Menihek	Progressive Conservative	1989
H. Neil Windsor	Mount Pearl	Progressive Conservative	1979
Jim Walsh	Mount Scio-Bell Island	Liberal	1989
Edward Roberts	Naskaupi	Liberal	1966, (Note: White Bay North) 1992
Nick Careen (Note: Judicial recount)	Placentia (Note: Results of election declared invalid in January 1994)	Progressive Conservative	1993
Walter Noel	Pleasantville	Liberal	1989
Gerald Smith	Port au Port	Liberal	1993
John Efford	Port de Grave	Liberal	1985
Chuck Furey	St. Barbe	Liberal	1985
Bud Hulan	St. George's	Liberal	1993
Hubert Kitchen	St. John's Centre	Liberal	1971, (Note: Harbour Grace) 1977, (Note: St. John's West) 1989
Jack Harris	St. John's East	New Democrat	1990
Jack Byrne	St. John's East Extern	Progressive Conservative	1993
Lloyd Matthews	St. John's North	Liberal	1993
Tom Murphy	St. John's South	Liberal	1989
Rex Gibbons	St. John's West	Liberal	1989
Fabian G. Manning	St. Mary's-The Capes	Progressive Conservative	1993
Kevin Aylward	Stephenville	Liberal	1985
Chris Decker	Strait of Belle Isle	Liberal	1985
Kay Young	Terra Nova	Liberal	1993
William H. Andersen	Torngat Mountains	Liberal	1993
LLoyd George Snow	Trinity-Bay de Verde	Liberal	1989
Doug Oldford	Trinity North	Liberal	1991
Walter Carter	Twillingate	Liberal	1962, 1975, (Note: St. Mary's-The Capes (Re-Elected as a Progressive Conservative)) 1985
Harvey Hodder	Waterford-Kenmount	Progressive Conservative	1993
Graham R. Flight	Windsor-Buchans	Liberal	1975, 1985, 1989

== By-elections ==
By-elections were held to replace members for various reasons:

Electoral district	Member elected	Affiliation	Election date	Reason
Placentia	Nick Careen	Progressive Conservative	February 21, 1994	Results of election declared invalid by Newfoundland Supreme Court on January 14, 1994
Grand Falls	Michael Mackey	Progressive Conservative	June 27, 1995	L Simms resigned seat on May 1, 1995
Gander	Gary Vey	Liberal	October 10, 1995	W Baker resigned seat on July 31, 1995
