= 43rd General Assembly of Newfoundland =

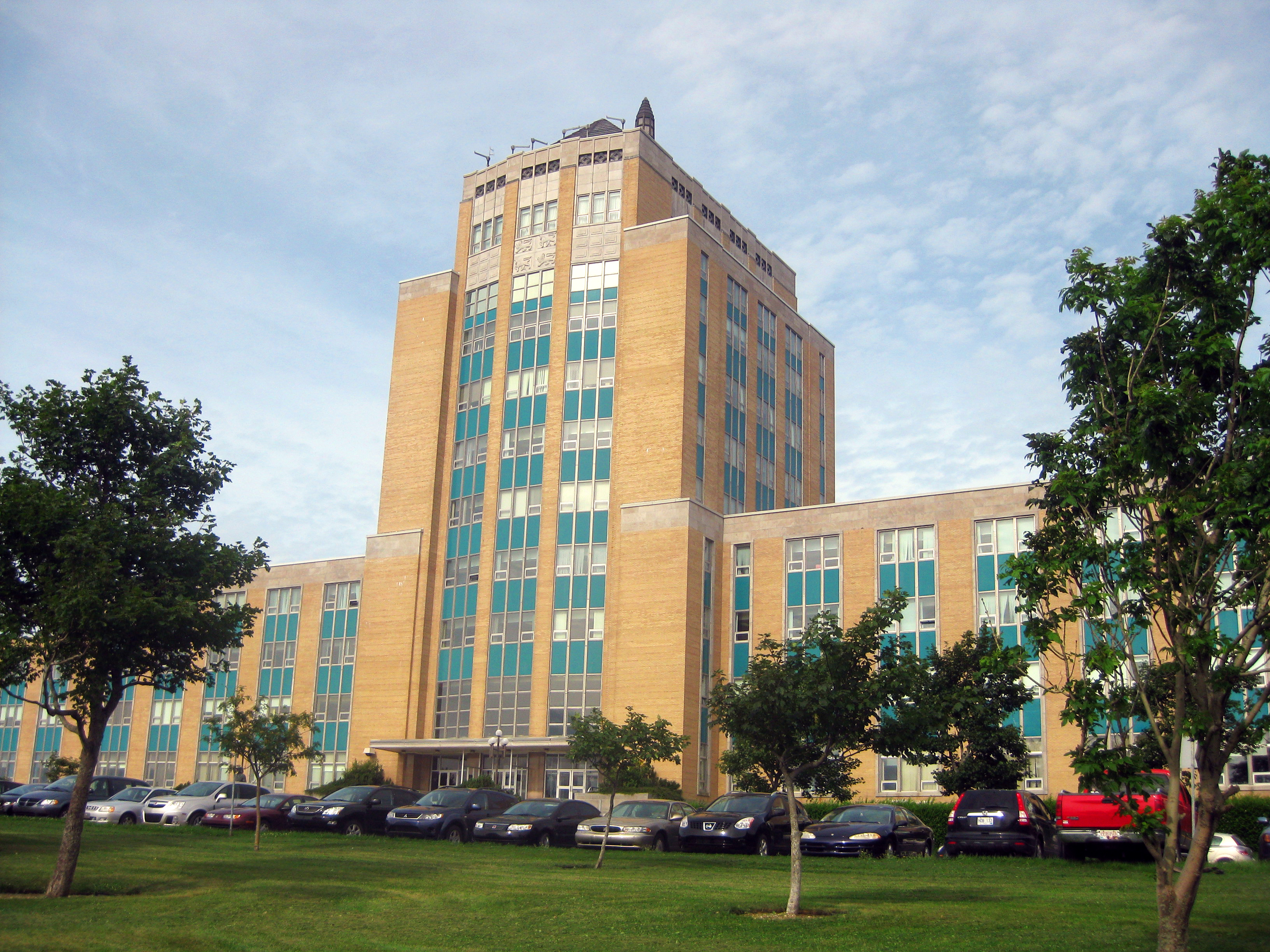
- Confederation Building East Block. Seat of the Newfoundland and Labrador government and the House of Assembly from 1960 to present.

History
- Founded: March 20, 1996
- Disbanded: January 18, 1999
- Preceded by: 42nd General Assembly of Newfoundland
- Succeeded by: 44th General Assembly of Newfoundland and Labrador

Leadership
- Premier: Brian Tobin

Elections
- Last election: 1996 Newfoundland general election

The members of the 43rd General Assembly of Newfoundland were elected in the Newfoundland general election held in February 1996. The general assembly sat from March 20, 1996 to January 18, 1999.

The Liberal Party led by Brian Tobin formed the government.

Lloyd Snow served as speaker.

There were three sessions of the 43rd General Assembly:

Session	Start	End
1st	March 20, 1996	March 10, 1997
2nd	March 11, 1997	March 17, 1998
3rd	March 18, 1998	January 18, 1999

Frederick Russell served as lieutenant governor of Newfoundland until 1997. Arthur Maxwell House succeeded Russell as lieutenant-governor.

== Members of the Assembly ==
The following members were elected to the assembly in 1996:

Member	Electoral district	Party	First elected / previously elected
Paul Shelley	Baie Verte	Progressive Conservative	1993
Brian Tobin	Bay of Islands	Liberal	1996
Percy Barrett	Bellevue	Liberal	1989
Beaton Tulk	Bonavista North	Liberal	1979, (Note: Fogo) 1993
Roger Fitzgerald	Bonavista South	Progressive Conservative	1993
Bill Ramsay	Burgeo & La Poile	Liberal	1989
Mary Hodder	Burin-Placentia West	Liberal	1996
Jack Byrne	Cape St. Francis	Progressive Conservative	1993
Art Reid	Carbonear-Harbour Grace	Liberal	1989
Yvonne Jones	Cartwright-L'Anse au Clair	Independent	1996
Jim Walsh	Conception Bay East – Bell Island	Liberal	1989
Bob French	Conception Bay South	Progressive Conservative	1996
Roger Grimes	Exploits	Liberal	1989
Loyola Sullivan	Ferryland	Progressive Conservative	1992
Oliver Langdon	Fortune Bay-Cape La Hune	Liberal	1989 (Note: First Elected as a Progressive Conservative)
Sandra Kelly	Gander	Liberal	1996
Judy Foote	Grand Bank	Liberal	1996
Anna Thistle	Grand Falls - Buchans	Liberal	1996
Don Whelan	Harbour Main - Whitbourne	Liberal	1993
Bob Mercer (Note: Judicial recount)	Humber East	Liberal	1996
Rick Woodford	Humber Valley	Liberal	1985
Paul Dicks	Humber West	Liberal	1989
Ed Byrne	Kilbride	Progressive Conservative	1993
Perry Canning	Labrador West	Liberal	1996
Ernie McLean	Lake Melville	Liberal	1996
Melvin Penney	Lewisporte	Liberal	1989
Julie Bettney	Mount Pearl	Liberal	1996
Anthony Sparrow	Placentia & St. Mary's	Liberal	1996
Gerald Smith	Port au Port	Liberal	1993
John Efford	Port de Grave	Liberal	1985
Chuck Furey	St. Barbe	Liberal	1985
Kevin Aylward	St. George's-Stephenville East	Liberal	1985
Joan Aylward	St. John's Centre	Liberal	1996
John Ottenheimer	St. John's East	Progressive Conservative	1996
Lloyd Matthews	St. John's North	Liberal	1993
Tom Osborne	St. John's South	Progressive Conservative	1996
Rex Gibbons	St. John's West	Liberal	1989
Sheila Osborne (1997)	St. John's West	Progressive Conservative	1997
Jack Harris	Signal Hill-Quidi Vidi	New Democrat	1990
Tom Lush	Terra Nova	Liberal	1975, 1985, (Note: Bonavista North) 1989
Chris Decker	The Straits – White Bay North	Liberal	1985
Ralph Wiseman	Topsail	Liberal	1996
Wally Andersen	Torngat Mountains	Liberal	1996
Lloyd Snow	Trinity-Bay de Verde	Liberal	1989
Doug Oldford	Trinity North	Liberal	1991
Gerry Reid	Twillingate & Fogo	Liberal	1996
Walter Noel	Virginia Waters	Liberal	1989
Harvey Hodder	Waterford Valley	Progressive Conservative	1993
Graham Flight	Windsor-Springdale	Liberal	1975, 1985, 1989

== By-elections ==
By-elections were held to replace members for various reasons:

Electoral district	Member elected	Affiliation	Election date	Reason
St. John's West	Sheila Osborne	Progressive Conservative	July 21, 1997	R Gibbons resigned seat on April 30, 1997 to run in a federal election
