= 1993 Newfoundland general election =

Canadian provincial election

- May 3, 1993

52 seats of the Newfoundland House of Assembly 27 seats needed for a majority
- Turnout: 83.6% (▲3.0 pp)
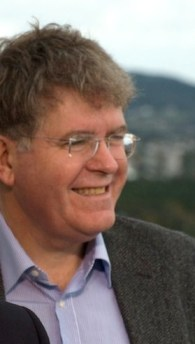
	First party	Second party	Third party
	LIB
Leader	Clyde Wells	Len Simms	Jack Harris
Party	Liberal	Progressive Conservative	New Democratic
Leader's seat	Bay of Islands	Grand Falls-Windsor-Buchans	St. John's East
Last election	31	21	0
Seats won	35	16	1
Seat change	▲4	▼5	▲1
Popular vote	148,274	127,150	22,399
Percentage	49.1%	42.1%	7.4%
Swing	▲1.9	▼5.5	▲3.0
Premier before election
Clyde Wells
Liberal
Premier after election
Clyde Wells
Liberal

The 1993 Newfoundland general election was held on May 3, 1993, to elect members of the 42nd General Assembly of Newfoundland. It was won by the Liberal party.

== Results ==
Party	Leader	1989	Seats won	% change	Popular vote	(%)
Liberal	Clyde Wells	31	35	+6.5%	148,274	49.1%
Progressive Conservative	Len Simms	21	16	-24%	127,150	42.1%
New Democratic	Jack Harris	0	1	N/A	22,399	7.4%
Other		0	0	0%	3,967	1.7%
Total		52	52	-	302,631	100%

== Results by district ==
- Names in **boldface type** represent party leaders.
- † indicates that the incumbent did not again.
- § indicates that the incumbent lost their party's nomination.

=== St. John's ===
Electoral district	Candidates			Incumbent
Electoral district	Liberal	PC	NDP	Incumbent
Kilbride	Gerald Glavine; 3,086; 39.04%	Ed Byrne; 3,709; 46.92%	Wayne Lucas; 1,110; 14.04%	Robert Aylward†
Pleasantville	Walter Noel; 3,483; 46.07%	Randy Pearcey; 3,232; 42.75%	Elaine Price; 846; 11.19%	Walter Noel
St. John's Centre	Hubert Kitchen; 2,990; 47.25%	Paul Stapleton; 2,464; 38.94%	Fraser March; 874; 13.81%	Hubert Kitchen
St. John's East	Joan Cook; 1,728; 31.31%	Sean Fitzgerald; 1,285; 24.02%	**Jack Harris**; 2,336; 43.67%	**Jack Harris**
St. John's North	Lloyd Matthews; 2,520; 50.06%	Warren Babb; 1,704; 33.85%	Sara Rich; 810; 16.09%	Phil Warren†
St. John's South	Tom Murphy; 2,432; 48.18%	Jerome Quinlan; 2,040; 40.41%	Bert Pitcher; 576; 11.41%	Tom Murphy
St. John's West	Rex Gibbons; 3,094; 48.24%	Paul Sears; 2,485; 38.74%	Bonnie MacGillivray; 835; 13.02%	Rex Gibbons
Waterford-Kenmount	Eric Gullage; 3,837; 41.61%	Harvey Hodder; 4,731; 51.31%	Scott Anderson; 653; 7.08%	Eric Gullage

=== St. John's suburbs ===
Electoral district	Candidates				Incumbent
Electoral district	Liberal	PC	NDP	Other	Incumbent
Conception Bay South	Pat Cowan; 2,995; 46.77%	Bud Suter; 2,413; 37.69%	George Corbett; 895; 13.98%	Elijah Dawe (Independent); 100; 1.56%	Pat Cowan
Mount Pearl	Bill Rowe; 2,986; 31.26%	Neil Windsor; 5,799; 60.70%	Sharon King; 768; 8.04%		Neil Windsor
Mount Scio-Bell Island	Jim Walsh; 4,183; 50.89%	Larry O'Keefe; 3,272; 39.81%	Valerie Stafford; 765; 9.31%		Jim Walsh
St. John's East Extern	Sam Connors; 3,383; 39.40%	Jack Byrne; 4,144; 47.04%	Cle Newhook; 1,283; 14.56%		Kevin Parsons†

=== Avalon Peninsula ===
Electoral district	Candidates				Incumbent
Electoral district	Liberal	PC	NDP	Other	Incumbent
Carbonear	Art Reid; 3,672; 53.87%	Lew Cole; 2,772; 40.67%	Ben Baker Jr. 372; 5.46%		Art Reid
Ferryland	Mary O'Brien; 1,125; 22.65%	Loyola Sullivan; 3,675; 74.00%	Vicki Silk; 166; 3.34%		Loyola Sullivan
Harbour Grace	John Crane; 2,803; 51.13%	Douglas Adams; 2,576; 46.99%	Ted Noseworthy; 103; 1.88%		John Crane
Harbour Main	Don Whelan; 3,310; 45.79%	Randy Simms; 3,141; 43.46%	Gus Flannigan; 777; 10.75%		Norman Doyle†
Placentia (Note: A judicial recount was held in this riding. The results were subsequently voided by the Supreme Court of Newfoundland and a by-election was held which affirmed Careen's victory.)	William Hogan; 2,260; 48.81%	Nick Careen; 2,281; 49.27%	Lena Hickey; 89; 1.92%		William Hogan
Port de Grave	John Efford; 4,835; 73.37%	Betty Gosse; 1,219; 18.50%	Jerry Earle; 467; 7.09%	Arthur Petten (Independent); 69; 1.05%	John Efford
St. Mary's-The Capes	Fred B. Rowe; 1,368; 31.29%	Fabian Manning; 2,832; 64.78%	Ian Penney; 172; 3.93%		Loyola Hearn†
Trinity-Bay de Verde	Lloyd Snow; 2,617; 54.06%	Charles Sparkes; 1,662; 34.33%	Lucy Tuck; 305; 6.30%	Peter Hiscock (Independent); 257; 5.31%	Lloyd Snow

=== Eastern Newfoundland ===
Electoral district	Candidates			Incumbent
Electoral district	Liberal	PC	NDP	Incumbent
Bellevue	Percy Barrett; 3,956; 62.76%	Frederick Drover; 1,803; 28.61%	John Robinson; 544; 8.63%	Percy Barrett
Bonavista North	Tom Lush; 3,722; 63.72%	John Ackerman; 1,770; 30.30%	Ed Brown; 349; 5.98%	Tom Lush
Bonavista South	Aubrey Gover; 2,235; 44.74%	Roger Fitzgerald; 2,613; 52.31%	Marion Quinton; 147; 2.94%	Aubrey Gover
Fogo	Beaton Tulk; 3,295; 54.09%	Sam Winsor; 2,663; 43.71%	Sam Kelly; 134; 2.20%	Sam Winsor
Terra Nova	Kay Young; 3,235; 56.77%	Glen Greening; 2,300; 40.37%	Kevin Muggridge; 163; 2.86%	Glen Greening
Trinity North	Doug Oldford; 3,302; 54.62%	Wilson Wiseman; 2,393; 39.59%	Martin Sceviour; 350; 5.79%	Doug Oldford

=== Central Newfoundland ===
Electoral district	Candidates				Incumbent
Electoral district	Liberal	PC	NDP	Other	Incumbent
Baie Verte-White Bay	Harold Small; 1,830; 36.04%	Paul Shelley; 3,172; 62.48%	Rose Howe; 75; 1.48%		Harold Small
Exploits	Roger Grimes; 3,227; 51.43%	Paul Cooper; 2,677; 42.66%	Reginald Hemeon; 371; 5.91%		Roger Grimes
Gander	Winston Baker; 3,876; 63.40%	John Elliott; 1,654; 27.05%	Roy Locke; 584; 9.55%		Winston Baker
Grand Falls	Edward Langdon; 1,421; 27.39%	**Len Simms**; 3,470; 66.89%	John Mackey; 297; 5.72%		**Len Simms**
Green Bay	Ray Whalen; 1,679; 31.42%	Alvin Hewlett; 2,671; 49.98%	Wayne Budgell; 472; 8.83%	Wilfred Bartlett (Independent); 522; 9.77%	Alvin Hewlett
Lewisporte	Melvin Penney; 3,696; 55.42%	Rex Freake; 2,840; 42.59%	Ruth Larson; 248; 3.72%		Melvin Penney
Twillingate	Walter Carter; 2,893; 63.91%	Raymond Andrews; 1,580; 34.90%	Peter Halliday; 54; 1.19%		Walter Carter
Windsor-Buchans	Graham Flight; 2,621; 55.99%	Ray Hunter; 1,888; 40.33%	Joe Tremblett; 172; 3.67%		Graham Flight

=== Southern Newfoundland ===
Electoral district	Candidates				Incumbent
Electoral district	Liberal	PC	NDP	Other	Incumbent
Burgeo-Bay d'Espoir	Dave Gilbert; 2,980; 64.54%	James Oxford; 1,450; 31.41%	Sam Organ; 187; 4.05%		Dave Gilbert
Burin-Placentia West	Sadie Popovitch-Penny; 3,322; 41.12%	Glenn Tobin; 8,078; 53.71%	Sunitha Anjilvel; 417; 5.16%		Glenn Tobin
Fortune-Hermitage	Oliver Langdon; 3,057; 65.45%	Kathy Dunderdale; 1,391; 29.78%	Terry Hickey; 223; 4.77%		Oliver Langdon
Grand Bank	Judy Foote; 2,805; 43.88%	Bill Matthews; 3,406; 53.29%	Joseph Edwards; 181; 2.83%		Bill Matthews
La Poile	Bill Ramsay; 2,706; 49.98%	Cal Mitchell; 1,403; 25.91%	Janet Francis; 99; 1.83%	Paul Gillingham (Independent); 1,206; 22.28%	Bill Ramsay

=== Western Newfoundland ===
Electoral district	Candidates				Incumbent
Electoral district	Liberal	PC	NDP	Other	Incumbent
Bay of Islands	**Clyde Wells**; 3,853; 63.50%	Arthur Bull; 2,048; 33.75%	Kevin Hynes; 167; 2.75%		**Clyde Wells**
Humber East	Priscilla Boutcher; 3,081; 44.26%	Lynn Verge; 3,696; 53.10%	Maureen Mills; 184; 2.64%		Lynn Verge
Humber Valley	Gary Gale; 2,063; 40.40%	Rick Woodford; 2,944; 57.66%	Catherine Shortall; 99; 1.94%		Rick Woodford
Humber West	Paul Dicks; 3,603; 58.29%	Gerard Ledrew; 2,390; 38.67%	Beatrice Buckley; 188; 3.04%		Paul Dicks
Port au Port	Gerald Smith; 2,719; 64.55%	Godfrey White; 1,205; 28.61%	Terry Benoit; 288; 6.84%		Jim Hodder†
St. Barbe	Chuck Furey; 3,580; 57.54%	Lorinda O'Connell; 1,900; 30.54%	Edward Hollahan; 742; 11.93%		Chuck Furey
St. George's	Bud Hulan; 2,015; 41.95%	Cynthia Downey; 1,514; 31.52%	Harold Bennett; 189; 3.94%	Larry Short (Independent); 900; 18.74%	Larry Short§
St. George's	Bud Hulan; 2,015; 41.95%	Cynthia Downey; 1,514; 31.52%	Harold Bennett; 189; 3.94%	Hazel McIsaac (Independent); 185; 3.85%	Larry Short§
Stephenville	Kevin Aylward; 2,325; 58.61%	Lorne Barbour; 1,350; 34.03%	Sheila White; 292; 7.36%		Kevin Aylward
Strait of Belle Isle	Chris Decker; 3,124; 55.10%	Wes Cull; 1,558; 27.48%	Augustine Rumbolt; 314; 5.54%	Wade Reid (Independent); 674; 11.89%	Chris Decker

=== Labrador ===
Electoral district	Candidates				Incumbent
Electoral district	Liberal	PC	NDP	Other	Incumbent
Eagle River	Danny Dumaresque; 1,574; 66.95%	Michael Kelly; 484; 20.59%	Jessie Bird; 293; 12.46%		Danny Dumaresque
Menihek	Perry Canning; 2,840; 46.00%	Alec Snow; 3,086; 49.98%	Ruth Larson; 248; 4.02%		Alec Snow
Naskaupi	Edward Roberts; 2,341; 57.49%	Dennis Conway; 1,562; 38.36%	Tom Davis; 115; 2.82%	Tom Green (Independent); 35; 0.86%	Edward Roberts
Naskaupi	Edward Roberts; 2,341; 57.49%	Dennis Conway; 1,562; 38.36%	Tom Davis; 115; 2.82%	Maurice Coombs (Independent); 19; 0.47%	Edward Roberts
Torngat Mountains (Note: A judicial recount was held in this riding.)	William Andersen III; 591; 48.80%	Patricia Ford; 588; 48.55%	Felix Barnable; 32; 2.64%		Garfield Warren†
