= 1996 Newfoundland general election =

Canadian provincial election

- February 22, 1996

48 seats of the Newfoundland House of Assembly 25 seats were needed for a majority
- Turnout: 74.4% (▼9.2 pp)
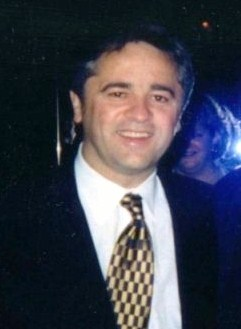

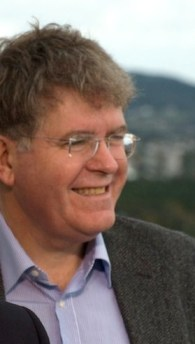
	First party	Second party	Third party
		PC
Leader	Brian Tobin	Lynn Verge	Jack Harris
Party	Liberal	Progressive Conservative	New Democratic
Leader's seat	Bay of Islands	Humber East (lost re-election)	Signal Hill-Quidi Vidi
Last election	35	16	1
Seats won	37	9	1
Seat change	▲2	▼7	±0
Popular vote	157,229	110,312	12,706
Percentage	55.10%	38.66%	4.45%
Swing	▲6.0pp	▼3.44pp	▼2.95pp
- Popular vote by riding. As this is an FPTP election, seat totals are not determined by popular vote, but instead via results by each riding. Click the map for more details.
Premier before election
Brian Tobin
Liberal
Premier after election
Brian Tobin
Liberal

The 1996 Newfoundland general election was held on February 22, 1996, to elect members of the 43rd General Assembly of Newfoundland. It was won by the Liberal Party under new leader Brian Tobin. PC Leader Lynn Verge was not re-elected in her riding of Humber East.

== Results ==
Party	Leader	1993	Seats won	% change	Popular vote	(%)
Liberal	Brian Tobin	35	37	+5.7%	157,229	55.10%
Progressive Conservative	Lynn Verge	16	9	-44%	110,312	38.66%
New Democratic	Jack Harris	1	1	0%	12,706	4.45%
Other		0	1	0%	5,111	1.79%
Total		52	48	-	285,385	100%

== Results by district ==
- Names in **boldface type** represent party leaders.
- † represents that the incumbent is not running again.
- ‡ represents that the incumbent is running in a different district.

=== St. John's ===
Electoral district	Candidates				Incumbent
Electoral district	Liberal	PC	NDP	Other	Incumbent
Kilbride; 77.50% turnout	Gerry Glavine; 3,118; 46.67%	Ed Byrne; 3,185; 47.67%	Mary Snow; 378; 5.66%		Ed Byrne
St. John's Centre; 74.31% turnout	Joan Aylward; 2,579; 43.05%	Paul Brown; 2,254; 37.62%	Wayne Lucas; 1,158; 19.33%		Hubert Kitchen‡ (ran in St. John's East)
St. John's East; 79.37% turnout	Hubert Kitchen; 2,340; 38.20%	John Ottenheimer; 2,989; 48.80%	Sean Murray; 796; 13.00%		Jack Harris‡ (ran in Signal Hill-Quidi Vidi)
St. John's North; 73.95% turnout	Lloyd Matthews; 2,789; 56.37%	Ian Carter; 1,649; 33.33%	Raj Sharan; 510; 10.31%		Lloyd Matthews
St. John's South; 70.73% turnout	Tom Murphy; 2,417; 40.62%	Tom Osborne; 2,521; 42.36%	Sue Skipton; 858; 14.42%	Bill Maddigan (Independent); 155; 2.60%	Tom Murphy
St. John's West; 74.82% turnout	Rex Gibbons; 4,152; 64.36%	Bren Kelly; 1,648; 25.55%	Pat Lynch; 651; 10.09%		Rex Gibbons
Signal Hill-Quidi Vidi; 79.89% turnout	Joan Cook; 1,661; 30.29%	Cy Mills; 902; 16.45%	**Jack Harris**; 2,800; 51.07%	Jason Crummey (Terra Nova Greens); 120; 2.19%	New district
Virginia Waters; 73.88% turnout	Walter Noel; 3,639; 55.67%	Bev LeMoine; 2,348; 35.92%	Bob Buckingham; 550; 8.41%		New District

=== St. John's suburbs ===
Electoral district	Candidates				Incumbent
Electoral district	Liberal	PC	NDP	Other	Incumbent
Cape St. Francis; 82.63% turnout	Jim Martin; 3,158; 48.60%	Jack Byrne; 3,299; 51.09%			Jack Byrne; St. John's East Extern
Conception Bay East & Bell Island; 73.72% turnout	Jim Walsh; 2,909; 48.39%	Doug Cole; 2,220; 36.93%	David Sullivan; 316; 5.26%	Kenneth Kavanagh (Independent); 566; 9.42%	Jim Walsh; Mount Scio-Bell Island
Conception Bay South; 75.51% turnout	Bill Dawe; 2,628; 43.50%	Bob French; 3,051; 50.50%	Harvey Taylor; 363; 6.00%		Pat Cowan†
Mount Pearl; 80.94% turnout	Julie Bettney; 3,686; 53.51%	Neil Windsor; 2,927; 42.49%	Sam Kelly; 275; 3.99%		Neil Windsor
Topsail; 79.14% turnout	Ralph Wiseman; 3,510; 54.72%	Dianne Whalen; 2,905; 45.28%			New district
Waterford Valley; 73.88% turnout	Bernie Heywood; 2,858; 45.35%	Harvey Hodder; 3,444; 54.65%			Harvey Hodder; Waterford-Kenmount

=== Avalon and Burin peninsulas ===
Electoral district	Candidates				Incumbent
Electoral district	Liberal	PC	NDP	Other	Incumbent
Bellevue; 69.15% turnout	Percy Barrett; 3,576; 63.11%	Nick Careen; 1,832; 32.33%	Lee Ingram; 258; 4.55%		Percy Barrett
Burin-Placentia West; 79.71% turnout	Mary Hodder; 4,944; 72.29%	Terry Keating; 1,895; 27.71%			Glenn Tobin†
Carbonear-Harbour Grace; 75.63% turnout	Art Reid; 3,846; 56.26%	George Faulkner; 2,698; 39.47%	Linda Soper; 292; 4.27%		Art Reid; Carbonear
Carbonear-Harbour Grace; 75.63% turnout	Art Reid; 3,846; 56.26%	George Faulkner; 2,698; 39.47%	Linda Soper; 292; 4.27%		Merged district
Carbonear-Harbour Grace; 75.63% turnout	Art Reid; 3,846; 56.26%	George Faulkner; 2,698; 39.47%	Linda Soper; 292; 4.27%		John Crane†; Harbour Grace
Ferryland; 85.33% turnout	Tom Best; 2,237; 31.64%	Loyola Sullivan; 4,834; 68.34%			Loyola Sullivan
Grand Bank; 76.86% turnout	Judy Foote; 4,136; 62.13%	Herb Edwards; 2,521; 37.87%			Bill Matthews†
Harbour Main-Whitbourne; 76.91% turnout	Don Whelan; 3,407; 52.61%	Eugene Conway; 2,705; 41.77%	Gus Flannigan; 239; 3.69%	Norm Sylvia (Independent); 125; 1.93%	Don Whelan; Harbour Main
Placentia & St. Mary's; 86.67% turnout	Anthony Sparrow; 3,601; 51.38%	Fabian Manning; 3,407; 48.62%			Nick Careen‡ Placentia (ran in Bellevue)
Placentia & St. Mary's; 86.67% turnout	Anthony Sparrow; 3,601; 51.38%	Fabian Manning; 3,407; 48.62%			Merged district
Placentia & St. Mary's; 86.67% turnout	Anthony Sparrow; 3,601; 51.38%	Fabian Manning; 3,407; 48.62%			Fabian Manning; St. Mary's-The Capes
Port de Grave; 76.98% turnout	John Efford; 4,603; 67.63%	Robert Lundrigan; 2,203; 32.37%			John Efford
Trinity-Bay de Verde; 73.16% turnout	Lloyd Snow; 3,765; 56.43%	Nellie Squires; 2,176; 38.28%	Bill Hiscock; 320; 5.29%		Lloyd Snow

=== Central Newfoundland ===
Electoral district	Candidates				Incumbent
Electoral district	Liberal	PC	NDP	Other	Incumbent
Baie Verte; 79.95% turnout	Bud Hulan; 2,380; 39.95%	Paul Shelley; 3,578; 60.05%			Paul Shelley; Baie Verte-White Bay
Bonavista North; 73.74% turnout	Beaton Tulk; 3,594; 56.69%	Sam Winsor; 2,463; 38.85%		Wayne Davis (Independent); 283; 4.46%	Tom Lush‡ (ran in Terra Nova)
Bonavista South; 78.29% turnout	Kay Young; 2,474; 34.10%	Roger Fitzgerald; 4,781; 65.90%			Roger Fitzgerald
Exploits; 65.93% turnout	Roger Grimes; 3,262; 59.89%	Rod Stockley; 1,581; 29.02%	Peter Langdon; 604; 11.09%		Roger Grimes
Gander; 78.32% turnout	Sandra Kelly; 3,585; 55.80%	Dan Crummell; 2,840; 44.20%			Gary Vey†
Grand Falls-Buchans; 78.82% turnout	Anna Thistle; 3,441; 50.24%	Mike Mackey; 2,321; 33.89%	Joe Tremblett; 1,087; 15.87%		Mike Mackey; Grand Falls
Lewisporte; 70.00% turnout	Melvin Penney; 3,252; 55.59%	Rex Freake; 2,598; 44.41%			Melvin Penney
Terra Nova; 69.75% turnout	Tom Lush; 4,049; 66.31%	Glenn Greening; 2,057; 33.69%			Kay Lush‡ (ran in Bonavista South)
Trinity North; 65.98% turnout	Doug Oldford; 3,784; 64.04%	Sheila Kelly-Blackmore; 2,125; 35.96%			Doug Oldford
Twillingate & Fogo; 67.46% turnout	Gerry Reid; 3,885; 63.85%	Terry Reid; 1,689; 27.76%	Wayne Greenham; 511; 8.40%		Walter C. Carter†; Twillingate
Twillingate & Fogo; 67.46% turnout	Gerry Reid; 3,885; 63.85%	Terry Reid; 1,689; 27.76%	Wayne Greenham; 511; 8.40%		Merged district
Twillingate & Fogo; 67.46% turnout	Gerry Reid; 3,885; 63.85%	Terry Reid; 1,689; 27.76%	Wayne Greenham; 511; 8.40%		Beaton Tulk; Fogo (ran in Bonavista North)
Windsor-Springdale; 66.99% turnout	Graham Flight; 2,857; 47.71%	Alvin Hewlett; 2,841; 47.44%	Jim Hobbs; 290; 4.84%		Graham Flight; Windsor-Buchans

=== Western and Southern Newfoundland ===
Electoral district	Candidates				Incumbent
Electoral district	Liberal	PC	NDP	Other	Incumbent
Bay of Islands; 75.77% turnout	**Brian Tobin**; 3,997; 65.68%	Paul Hunt; 1,672; 27.47%	Hayward Pardy; 417; 6.85%		Clyde Wells†
Burgeo & La Poile; 67.84% turnout	Bill Ramsay; 3,598; 60.17%	Cheryl Stagg; 2,382; 39.83%			Dave Gilbert†; Burgeo-Bay D'Espoir
Burgeo & La Poile; 67.84% turnout	Bill Ramsay; 3,598; 60.17%	Cheryl Stagg; 2,382; 39.83%			Merged district
Burgeo & La Poile; 67.84% turnout	Bill Ramsay; 3,598; 60.17%	Cheryl Stagg; 2,382; 39.83%			Bill Ramsay; La Poile
Fortune Bay-Cape La Hune; 66.75% turnout	Oliver Langdon; 4,046; 74.73%	Kay Blake; 1,368; 25.27%			Oliver Langdon; Fortune-Hermitage
Humber East; 80.76% turnout	Bob Mercer; 3,424; 50.05%	**Lynn Verge**; 3,417; 49.95%			**Lynn Verge**
Humber Valley; 71.27% turnout	Rick Woodford; 4,109; 74.91%	Evelyn Organ; 1,376; 25.09%			Rick Woodford
Humber West; 72.49% turnout	Paul Dicks; 4,215; 73.86%	Pat Callahan; 1,492; 26.14%			Paul Dicks
Port au Port; 71.05% turnout	Gerald Smith; 4,011; 67.93%	Scott Hurley; 1,894; 32.07%			Gerald Smith
St. Barbe; 74.17% turnout	Chuck Furey; 3,374; 64.19%	Carolyn Lavers; 1,844; 35.08%			Chuck Furey
St. George's-Stephenville East; 66.01% turnout	Kevin Aylward; 3,505; 61.68%	Cec Stein; 1,640; 28.86%		Roy Spencer (Independent); 538; 9.47%	Bud Hulan‡ St. George's (ran in Baie Verte)
St. George's-Stephenville East; 66.01% turnout	Kevin Aylward; 3,505; 61.68%	Cec Stein; 1,640; 28.86%		Roy Spencer (Independent); 538; 9.47%	Merged district
St. George's-Stephenville East; 66.01% turnout	Kevin Aylward; 3,505; 61.68%	Cec Stein; 1,640; 28.86%		Roy Spencer (Independent); 538; 9.47%	Kevin Aylward; Stephenville
The Straits & White Bay North; 63.98% turnout	Chris Decker; 2,581; 49.27%	Conan Coates; 999; 19.07%		Dennis Coates (Independent); 1,659; 31.67%	Chris Decker; Strait of Belle Isle

=== Labrador ===
Electoral district	Candidates			Incumbent
Electoral district	Liberal	PC	Other	Incumbent
Cartwright-L'Anse au Clair; 86.69% turnout	Danny Dumaresque; 1,233; 41.94%	Berkley Bursey; 42; 1.43%	Yvonne Jones (Independent); 1,665; 56.63%	Danny Dumaresque; Eagle River
Labrador West; 82.46% turnout	Perry Canning; 3,547; 63.37%	Alec Snow; 2,140; 38.23%		Alec Snow; Menihek
Lake Melville; 60.38% turnout	Ernie McLean; 2,762; 76.57%	Darlene Gear-White; 845; 23.43%		Edward Roberts†; Naskaupi
Torngat Mountains; 91.97% turnout	Wally Andersen; 795; 70.29%	Bill Flowers; 336; 29.71%		William Andersen III†

== See also ==
- List of Newfoundland and Labrador General Assemblies
- List of Newfoundland and Labrador political parties

=== Parties ===
- Progressive Conservative Party of Newfoundland and Labrador (see also Progressive Conservative Party of Canada)
- Liberal Party of Newfoundland and Labrador (see also Liberal Party of Canada)
- Newfoundland and Labrador New Democratic Party (see also New Democratic Party)
