= 1999 Newfoundland general election =

Canadian provincial election

← 1996	February 9, 1999	2003 →

48 seats of the Newfoundland House of Assembly 25 seats were needed for a majority
- Turnout: 69.6% (▼4.8 pp)
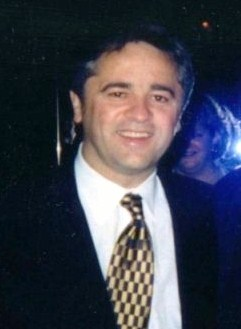

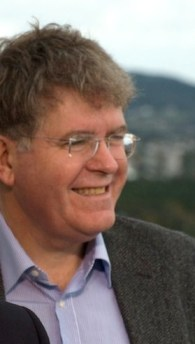
	First party	Second party	Third party
		PC
Leader	Brian Tobin	Ed Byrne	Jack Harris
Party	Liberal	Progressive Conservative	New Democratic
Leader's seat	Bay of Islands; Ran in The Straits & White Bay North	Kilbride	Signal Hill-Quidi Vidi
Last election	37	9	1
Seats won	32	14	2
Seat change	▼5	▲5	▲1
Popular vote	132,399	108,772	21,962
Percentage	49.62%	40.77%	8.23%
Swing	▼5.48pp	▲2.11pp	▲3.78pp
- Popular vote by riding. As this is an FPTP election, seat totals are not determined by popular vote, but instead via results by each riding. Click the map for more details.
Premier before election
Brian Tobin
Liberal
Premier after election
Brian Tobin
Liberal

The 1999 Newfoundland general election was held on February 9, 1999 to elect members of the 44th General Assembly of Newfoundland. It was won by the Liberal party.

== Results ==
Party	Leader	1996	Seats won	% change	Popular vote	(%)
Liberal	Brian Tobin	37	32	-16%	132,399	49.62%
Progressive Conservative	Ed Byrne	9	14	+56%	108,772	40.77%
New Democratic	Jack Harris	1	2	+100%	21,962	8.23%
Newfoundland & Labrador Party	Sue Kelland-Dyer	*	-	*	2,562	0.96%
Independent/No affiliation		1	-	-100%	1,112	0.42%
Total		48	48	-	266,807	100%

* Party did not nominate candidates in previous election.

== Results by district ==
- Names in **boldface type** represent party leaders.
- † represents that the incumbent is not running again.
- ‡ represents that the incumbent is running in a different district.

=== St. John's ===
Electoral district	Candidates				Incumbent
Electoral district	Liberal	PC	NDP	Other	Incumbent
Kilbride; 77.58% turnout	Barbara Howlett; 2,133; 31.90%	**Ed Byrne**; 4,145; 62.00%	Lee Ingram; 289; 4.32%	Vicki Stuckless (NL Party); 119; 1.78%	**Ed Byrne**
St. John's Centre; 76.66% turnout	Joan Aylward; 2,609; 42.27%	Paul Brown; 2,443; 39.58%	Valerie Long; 1,120; 18.15%		Joan Aylward
St. John's East; 76.84% turnout	Tom McGrath; 1,559; 26.28%	John Ottenheimer; 3,774; 63.61%	Barry Darby; 600; 10.11%		John Ottenheimer
St. John's North; 75.76% turnout	Lloyd Matthews; 2,304; 45.51%	Ray Andrews; 1,971; 38.93%	Dale Kirby; 788; 15.56%		Lloyd Matthews
St. John's South; 72.09% turnout	Patrick Kennedy; 1,563; 25.71%	Tom Osborne; 4,041; 66.47%	Judy Vanta; 374; 6.15%	Jason Crummey (Independent); 101; 1.66%	Tom Osborne
St. John's West; 74.57% turnout	Tom Moore; 2,532; 39.43%	Sheila Osborne; 3,206; 49.93%	Pat Lynch; 683; 10.64%		Sheila Osborne
Signal Hill-Quidi Vidi; 75.76% turnout	Pete Soucy; 2,010; 38.66%	Chris O'Brien; 793; 15.25%	**Jack Harris**; 2,179; 41.91%	Paul Hillier (NL Party); 116; 2.23% Shaun Dunn (Independent); 53; 1.02%	**Jack Harris**
Virginia Waters; 73.08% turnout	Walter Noel; 2,973; 47.43%	Paul Walsh; 2,277; 36.33%	Amanda Will; 887; 14.15%	Deanne Stapleton (Independent); 131; 2.09%	Walter Noel

=== St. John's suburbs ===
Electoral district	Candidates				Incumbent
Electoral district	Liberal	PC	NDP	NLFirst	Incumbent
Cape St. Francis; 86.83% turnout	Jim Martin; 2,169; 31.87%	Jack Byrne; 4,197; 61.67%	Shawn Sullivan; 440; 6.46%		Jack Byrne
Conception Bay East & Bell Island; 74.00% turnout	Jim Walsh; 2,426; 40.19%	Doug Cole; 1,803; 29.87%	Ken Kavanagh; 932; 15.44%	**Sue Kelland-Dyer**; 876; 14.51%	Jim Walsh
Conception Bay South; 75.32% turnout	Bill Lee; 1,806; 29.98%	Bob French; 3,888; 64.54%	Reg Porter; 330; 5.48%		Bob French
Mount Pearl; 73.19% turnout	Julie Bettney; 3,468; 55.70%	Cathy Sheehan; 2,269; 36.44%	Glen Grouchey; 489; 7.85%		Julie Bettney
Topsail; 79.77% turnout	Ralph Wiseman; 3,381; 52.16%	Rick Fifield; 2,533; 39.08%	Mary Snow; 568; 8.76%		Ralph Wiseman
Waterford Valley; 74.90% turnout	Paula Buckle; 2,680; 41.88%	Harvey Hodder; 3,480; 54.38%	Bill Maddigan; 239; 3.73%		Harvey Hodder

=== Avalon and Burin peninsulas ===
Electoral district	Candidates				Incumbent
Electoral district	Liberal	PC	NDP	NLFirst	Incumbent
Bellevue; 64.41% turnout	Percy Barrett; 3,229; 61.26%	Gus Coombs; 1,667; 31.63%	Mose Ingram; 375; 7.11%		Percy Barrett
Burin-Placentia West; 75.76% turnout	Mary Hodder; 3,469; 53.30%	Dominic Lundrigan; 2,658; 40.84%	Wayne Butler; 382; 5.87%		Mary Hodder
Carbonear-Harbour Grace; 75.12% turnout	George Sweeney; 4,132; 68.44%	Claude Garland; 37.54%	Kevin Noel; 391; 6.48%		Art Reid†
Ferryland; 81.86% turnout	Harold Mullowney; 2,141; 31.62%	Loyola Sullivan; 4,482; 66.20%	Gerry Ryan; 147; 2.17%		Loyola Sullivan
Grand Bank; 65.15% turnout	Judy Foote; 3,964; 70.18%	John Bolt; 1,146; 20.29%	Richard Rennie; 538; 9.53%		Judy Foote
Harbour Main-Whitbourne; 79.43% turnout	Wanda Dawe; 2,502; 37.44%	Tom Hedderson; 3,670; 54.92%	Fred Akerman; 511; 7.65%		Don Whelan†
Placentia & St. Mary's; 80.66% turnout	Anthony Sparrow; 2,938; 45.08%	Fabian Manning; 3,579; 54.92%			Anthony Sparrow
Port de Grave; 64.50% turnout	John Efford; 4,488; 78.75%	Paul Cooper; 1,026; 18.00%	Steve Quigly; 185; 3.25%		John Efford
Trinity-Bay de Verde; 64.84% turnout	Lloyd Snow; 3,201; 54.15%	Peter Bursey; 2,176; 36.81%	Jeff Jacobs; 320; 5.41%	Monty Newhook; 214; 3.62%	Lloyd Snow

=== Central Newfoundland ===
Electoral district	Candidates				Incumbent
Electoral district	Liberal	PC	NDP	Other	Incumbent
Baie Verte; 69.07% turnout	Gerald Burton; 1,988; 38.68%	Paul Shelley; 3,152; 61.32%			Paul Shelley
Bonavista North; 61.01% turnout	Beaton Tulk; 3,943; 75.54%	Jim Cooze; 1,277; 24.46%			Beaton Tulk
Bonavista South; 68.50% turnout	George Clements; 1,768; 27.87%	Roger Fitzgerald; 4,496; 70.87%	Shawn Crann; 80; 1.26%		Roger Fitzgerald
Exploits; 61.89% turnout	Roger Grimes; 2,526; 49.50%	Gonzo Gillingham; 1,944; 38.10%		Arnold Best (NL Party); 633; 12.40%	Roger Grimes
Gander; 75.19% turnout	Sandra Kelly; 3,064; 49.56%	Kevin O'Brien; 2,926; 47.32%	Roy Locke; 193; 3.12%		Sandra Kelly
Grand Falls-Buchans; 69.84% turnout	Anna Thistle; 3,511; 58.05%	Lorne Woolridge; 2,349; 38.84%	Bob Buckingham; 188; 3.11%		Anna Thistle
Lewisporte; 71.92% turnout	Melvin Penney; 2,116; 35.08%	Tom Rideout; 3,791; 62.85%	Michael Dwyer; 125; 2.07%		Melvin Penney
Terra Nova; 60.01% turnout	Tom Lush; 3,514; 66.88%	Rob Stead; 1,740; 33.12%			Tom Lush
Trinity North; 65.58% turnout	Doug Oldford; 2,979; 50.70%	Sheila Kelly-Blackmore; 2,183; 37.15%	Dan Corbett; 714; 12.15%		Doug Oldford
Twillingate & Fogo; 56.40% turnout	Gerry Reid; 3,343; 65.82%	Gerald McKenna; 1,466; 28.86%		Dallas Mitchell (Independent); 270; 5.32%	Gerry Reid
Windsor-Springdale; 65.40% turnout	Graham Flight; 2,180; 37.30%	Ray Hunter; 3,192; 54.61%	Rose Howe; 115; 1.97%	Audrey Smith (Independent); 263; 4.50% Roger Bennett (Independent); 95; 1.63%	Graham Flight

=== Western and Southern Newfoundland ===
Electoral district	Candidates				Incumbent
Electoral district	Liberal	PC	NDP	Other	Incumbent
Bay of Islands; 68.65% turnout	Eddie Joyce; 3,164; 57.56%	Paul Hunt; 1,713; 31.16%	Israel Hann; 620; 11.28%		**Brian Tobin**‡ (ran in The Straits & White Bay North)
Burgeo & La Poile; 65.02% turnout	Kelvin Parsons; 3,421; 59.50%	Greg Sheaves; 1,988; 34.57%	Owen Marsden; 342; 5.95%		Bill Ramsay†
Fortune Bay-Cape La Hune; 56.04% turnout	Oliver Langdon; 3,189; 70.21%	Bob Baker; 1,353; 29.79%			Oliver Langdon
Humber East; 71.94% turnout	Bob Mercer; 3,197; 52.35%	Janice Wells; 2,405; 39.38%	Jean Mehaney; 246; 4.03%	David Ledrew (NL Party); 259; 4.24%	Bob Mercer
Humber Valley; 58.10% turnout	Rick Woodford; 3,051; 68.21%	Warren Rose; 1,422; 31.79%			Rick Woodford
Humber West; 61.19% turnout	Paul Dicks; 2,814; 58.41%	Pat Callahan; 1,152; 23.91%	Paul Bourgeois; 852; 17.84%		Paul Dicks
Port au Port; 63.45% turnout	Gerald Smith; 2,976; 56.50%	Ada Marche; 1,719; 32.64%	Sharon Whalen; 421; 7.99%	William Smallwood (Independent); 151; 2.87%	Gerald Smith
St. Barbe; 62.72% turnout	Chuck Furey; 2,878; 59.61%	Rod Roberts; 1,950; 40.39%			Chuck Furey
St. George's-Stephenville East; 56.26% turnout	Kevin Aylward; 2,546; 52.66%	Leonard Muise; 1,944; 40.21%		Dave Johnson (NL Party); 345; 7.14%	Kevin Aylward
The Straits & White Bay North; 52.76% turnout	**Brian Tobin**; 3,227; 74.77%	Ford Mitchelmore; 1,089; 25.23%			Chris Decker†

=== Labrador ===
Electoral district	Candidates			Incumbent
Electoral district	Liberal	PC	NDP	Incumbent
Cartwright-L'Anse au Clair; 63.66% turnout	Yvonne Jones; 1,832; 85.45%	Sharon Moores; 312; 14.55%		Yvonne Jones
Labrador West; 83.23% turnout	Perry Canning; 2,544; 45.07%	Susan Whitten; 400; 7.09%	Randy Collins; 2,700; 47.84%	Perry Canning
Lake Melville; 60.99% turnout	Ernie McLean; 1,915; 52.45%	Hayward Broomfield; 1,413; 38.70%	Ronald Peddle; 323; 8.85%	Ernie McLean
Torngat Mountains; 99.19% turnout	Wally Andersen; 1,036; 85.06%	Simeon Tshakapesh; 182; 14.94%		Wally Andersen

== See also ==
- List of Newfoundland and Labrador General Assemblies
- List of Newfoundland and Labrador political parties
