= Newfoundland and Labrador First Party =

- Former federal party
- Founded: November 5, 2004; 21 years ago (provincial); November 15, 2007; 18 years ago (federal)
- Dissolved: January 31, 2011; 15 years ago
- Headquarters: 10 Cole Place; St. John's, Newfoundland and Labrador; A1A 5G6
- Ideology: Newfoundland and Labrador regionalism
- Colours: Green, white, pink

The Newfoundland and Labrador First Party was a Canadian political party registered at both the federal and provincial levels of government in the province of Newfoundland and Labrador. The party advocated for Newfoundland and Labrador interests.

== Election results ==
Election	# of candidates	# of votes	% of popular vote	% in ridings contested	# of seats
2008	3	1801	0.01%	1.68%	0

=== Federal results ===
Riding	Province	Candidate	Votes	%	Placement
Humber—St. Barbe—Baie Verte	Newfoundland and Labrador	Wayne Ronald Bennett	967	3.7%	4/4
St. John's East	Newfoundland and Labrador	Les Coultas	347	0.84%	6/6
St. John's South—Mount Pearl	Newfoundland and Labrador	Greg Byrne	402	1.16%	5/6

=== Provincial results ===
Newfoundland and Labrador provincial by-election, February 21, 2006: Placentia—St. Mary’s
Party	Candidate	Votes	%
Progressive Conservative	Felix Collins	2,247	46.3
Independent	Nick Careen	1,641	33.8
Liberal	Kevin Power	931	19.2
Newfoundland and Labrador First	Tom Hickey	31	0.6
Total		4,850	
By-election called upon the resignation of Fabian Manning
Source(s) "Results of February 21 by election in Electoral District of Placentia & St. Mary's". Government of Newfoundland and Labrador - Office of the Chief Electoral Officer. February 24, 2006.

== History ==
The provincial party was publicly launched on November 5, 2004, and officially registered in February 2006. It ran in its first election in a February 21, 2006 by-election in the Placentia and St. Mary's electoral district where the party's president Tom Hickey won 31 of 4,862 votes. After the provincial election, the party dissolved itself at the provincial level to focus on the federal platform which it felt was the most productive arena in which to advocate for fairness and equality for the province within Canada.

The federal party, also led by Hickey, became eligible for registration by Elections Canada on November 15, 2007. It gained registered status in September 2008 as it entered three candidates in the 2008 federal election, where it attained 1.75% of the votes in those three districts.

Hickey was the founder of the First Party, which was established as a party in November 2004. Hickey (who ran unsuccessfully for the party in a Placentia—St. Mary's by-election held in 2006, winning only 31 votes) led the party from 2004 until 2008, when he was succeeded as party leader by Wayne Bennett.

=== Deregistration ===
The Party Executive was given official notification by registered letter to the Chief Agent of the party that as of January 31, 2011, the party would cease to exist and would be deregistered by Elections Canada. This deregistration was for failure to comply with the required submission of a minimum of 250 signed Declarations of Membership Forms in the allotted time period given.

Wayne Bennett contested the riding of Humber—St. Barbe—Baie Verte in the 2011 federal election, as an independent. He received 332 votes, 1.106% of the votes in the riding. Bennett would also go on to unsuccessfully seek the leadership of both the provincial Progressive Conservative and New Democratic parties.

== See also ==
- List of Newfoundland and Labrador political parties
- Secessionist movements of Canada#Newfoundland & Labrador
