= Anthony Sparrow (politician) =

Canadian politician

Anthony Sparrow MHA

Member of the Newfoundland House of Assembly for Placentia-St. Mary's
- In office 22 February 1996 – 9 February 1999
- Preceded by: Fabian Manning
- Succeeded by: Fabian Manning

Personal details
- Born: c. 1955 Dunville, Newfoundland, Canada
- Party: Liberal
- Profession: Businessman

Anthony G. Sparrow (born c. 1955) is a Canadian politician from Newfoundland and Labrador. He was the member of the Newfoundland House of Assembly (MHA) for Placentia-St. Mary's from 1996 to 1999.

== Politics ==
Sparrow is from Dunville, which amalgamated into Placentia in 1991. As a teenager, he was involved with the Liberal Youth Movement which supported Premier Joey Smallwood's election in the district of Placentia East.

He first attempted to enter the House of Assembly as the candidate for the provincial Liberal party in the redistributed riding of Placentia in 1975, but he narrowly lost to his Progressive Conservative (PC) opponent William G. Patterson. In the subsequent 1979 election, he made another run for the same seat, but lost the Liberal nomination to William Hogan. He contested the seat as an independent candidate where he was again defeated by Patterson.

Sparrow successfully returned to provincial politics in the 1996 election, where he narrowly defeated PC MHA Fabian Manning as the Liberal candidate in Placentia-St. Mary's. He was appointed to the Government Services Committee by Premier Brian Tobin. Manning regained his seat in the 1999 election.

Following his defeat, Sparrow became the Liberal candidate in a 2000 by-election for the federal riding of St. John's West which had been triggered upon the resignation of the incumbent PC Member of Parliament (MP) Charlie Power. Sparrow defeated Steve Kent, then the deputy mayor of Mount Pearl, in a nomination contest bolstered by support from his hometown of Placentia. Despite what was described by The Globe and Mail as "an all-out effort" by the Liberal party to promote his candidacy, Sparrow lost the election to PC candidate Loyola Hearn.

== Electoral history ==
St. John's West, Newfoundland by-election, May 15, 2000
Party	Candidate	Votes	%	±%
Progressive Conservative	Loyola Hearn	11,392	35.48	▼8.59
New Democratic	Greg Malone	11,036	34.37	▲18.77
Liberal	Anthony Sparrow	8,032	25.01	▼12.07
Alliance	Frank Hall	1,315	4.09	–
Independent	E. Sailor White	332	1.03	–
Total valid votes		32,107	99.74	
Total rejected ballots		103	0.26	
Total votes		32,210	44.31	
Eligible voters		72,697		
Progressive Conservative hold		Swing		-13.14

1999 Newfoundland general election: Placentia-St. Mary's
Party	Candidate	Votes	%	±%
Progressive Conservative	Fabian Manning	3,579	54.92	▲6.30
Liberal	Anthony Sparrow	2,938	45.08	▼6.30
Total valid votes		6,517	99.74	
Total rejected ballots		17	0.26	
Total votes		6,534	70.71	
Eligible voters		9,241		
Progressive Conservative gain from Liberal		Swing		+6.30

1996 Newfoundland general election: Placentia-St. Mary's
Party	Candidate	Votes	%	±%
Liberal	Anthony Sparrow	3,601	51.38	▲20.09
Progressive Conservative	Fabian Manning	3,407	48.62	▼16.16
Total valid votes		7,008	99.81	
Total rejected ballots		13	0.19	
Total votes		7,021	79.23	
Eligible voters		8,861		
Liberal gain from Progressive Conservative		Swing		+18.12

1979 Newfoundland general election: Placentia
Party	Candidate	Votes	%	±%
Progressive Conservative	William Patterson	1,962	46.34	▲4.94
Liberal	William Hogan	1,420	33.54	▲9.19
Independent	Anthony Sparrow	774	18.28	–
New Democratic	Patrick Fleming	78	1.84	▼3.12
Total valid votes		4,234	99.81	
Total rejected ballots		15	0.19	
Total votes		4,249	79.78	
Eligible voters		5,326		
Progressive Conservative hold		Swing		+7.06

1975 Newfoundland general election: Placentia
Party	Candidate	Votes	%	±%
Progressive Conservative	William Patterson	1,721	41.40	▼13.59
Liberal	Anthony Sparrow	1,698	40.85	▼4.16
Reform Liberal	Alphonsus Best	738	17.75	–
Total valid votes		4,157	99.78	
Total rejected ballots		9	0.22	
Total votes		4,166	78.90	
Eligible voters		5,326		
Progressive Conservative hold		Swing		-8.88
