= Judy Manning (lawyer) =

Canadian lawyer and politician

The Honourable Judy Manning ECNL

Minister of Justice and Public Safety of Newfoundland and Labrador
- In office September 30, 2014 – March 12, 2015
- Succeeded by: Darin King; Felix Collins

Personal details
- Born: July 9, 1978 (age 48) St. Bride's, Newfoundland and Labrador
- Occupation: Lawyer

Judy Manning (born July 9, 1978) is a Canadian lawyer in Newfoundland and Labrador.

She served as the Minister of Justice and Public Safety, Attorney General and Minister Responsible for the Status of Women in the provincial cabinet from September 30, 2014, to March 12, 2015.

Manning was appointed to cabinet by Premier Paul Davis despite not holding a seat in the House of Assembly.

== Background ==
Manning earned a bachelor of commerce (co-op) degree from Memorial University in 2001, and a bachelor of laws degree from Dalhousie University in 2004. She was called to the Newfoundland and Labrador bar in 2005 and to the Ontario bar in 2008.

Manning served as a review commissioner with the Workplace, Health, Safety and Compensation Review Division (WHSCRD) from April to September 2014.

Manning is the niece of Senator and former MHA Fabian Manning. On February 21, 2023, Manning's brother, Eugene Manning, announced his candidacy in the 2023 NL PC leadership election. Eugene Manning narrowly lost to Tony Wakeham.

== Politics ==
Manning's appointment to cabinet was subject to criticism due to her not being an elected Member of the House of Assembly and because she was unwilling to seek a seat in three by-elections. Manning stated she intended to be the Progressive Conservative candidate in the district of Placentia—St. Mary's when that seat became available. The seat at the time was represented by Felix Collins who had previously indicated he would not seek re-election. On March 12, 2015, Manning was removed from cabinet along with two other ministers. Davis cited cost savings as his reason for reducing his cabinet but also noted he was unwilling to have Manning serve in cabinet for up to a year without her holding a seat in the legislature. Davis said he had originally planned on calling a spring election but that was delayed till the fall by his government's decision to remove eight seats from the House of Assembly. It was later reported that when Manning was appointed to cabinet she and Davis were under the impression that Collins would resign his seat in the near future, creating a by-election for her to run in. However, Collins did not resign his seat and he found himself back in cabinet as Attorney General after Manning's departure due to him being the only lawyer within caucus. Manning unsuccessfully contested the 2015 provincial election in that district. She is currently a National Councillor for Newfoundland and Labrador for the Conservative Party of Canada.

== Electoral record ==
2015 Newfoundland and Labrador general election
Party	Candidate	Votes	%	±%
Liberal	Sherry Gambin-Walsh	3,789	66.00	+45.09
Progressive Conservative	Judy Manning	1,751	30.50	-19.36
New Democratic	Peter Beck	197	3.40	-25.83
Total valid votes		5,737	100.0	
Liberal gain		Swing		
