= William Hogan (Canadian politician) =

Canadian politician (1937–2022)

Minister of Municipal And Provincial Affairs
- In office February 12, 1992 – May 3, 1993
- Preceded by: Eric Gullage
- Succeeded by: Art Reid

MHA for Placentia
- In office 1989–1993
- Preceded by: William G. Patterson
- Succeeded by: Nick Careen

Minister of Social Services
- In office June 3, 1991 – February 12, 1992
- Preceded by: John Efford
- Succeeded by: Eric Gullage

Personal details
- Born: William Patrick Hogan; September 15, 1937 St. John's, Newfoundland
- Died: January 12, 2022 (aged 84)
- Party: Liberal Party of Newfoundland and Labrador
- Spouse: Mary Hawco (m. 1956; died 2015)
- Children: 5
- Occupation: certified safely professional

William Patrick Hogan (September 15, 1937 – January 12, 2022) was a Canadian politician in Newfoundland and Labrador. He represented Placentia in the Newfoundland House of Assembly from 1989 to 1993. He served in cabinet as Minister of Municipal and Provincial Affairs. Hogan was mayor of Dunville from 1969 to 1989, and also served as mayor of Placentia from 1997 to 2001, and 2005 to 2014. He died on January 12, 2022, at the age of 84.
