= Greg Power =

Canadian athlete, poet, farmer and politician

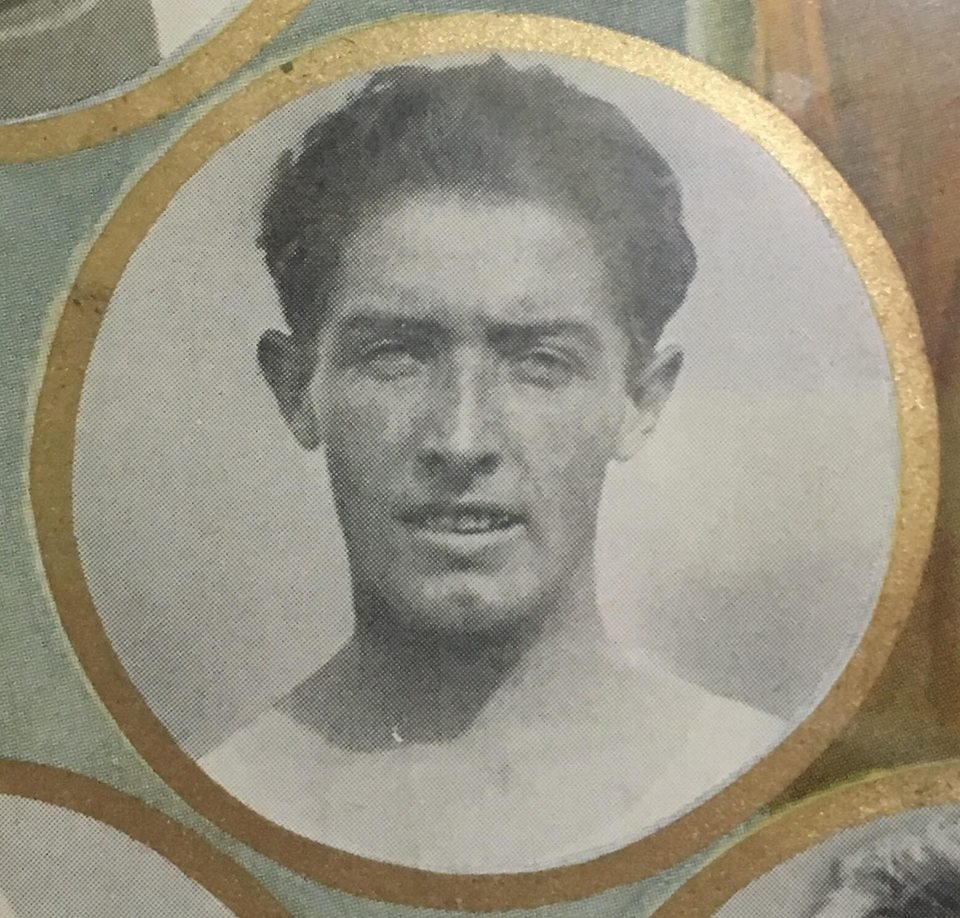
Greg Power, 1930 British Empire Games, Hamilton, Ontario, Canada, Champion Sprinter and Jumper

Gregory J. Power (March 22, 1909 – May 15, 1997) was a politician, office holder, farmer, poet and athlete, who was born in Dunville, Placentia Bay, Newfoundland. Power represented Placentia and St. Mary's from 1951 to 1956 and Placentia East from 1956 to 1959 in the Newfoundland House of Assembly.

The son of William and Gertrude Power, he was educated in St. John's and at Memorial University College. Power married Mary Ellen Crosbie. He was considered Joey Smallwood's right-hand man in the battle for Confederation of Newfoundland with Canada. He served as editor of the pro-Confederation newspaper The Confederate and wrote numerous editorial letters to local newspapers under the pseudonym "Housewife". His forte was satirical poetry.

Power ran unsuccessfully for a seat in the 1949 Federal election in St. John's West. Failing to win a seat he was instead appointed the first chairman of the Newfoundland Liquor Corporation. He was elected to the House of Assembly for Placentia East in the 1951 Provincial election and became Minister of Finance. He later served a Minister of Highways during the extensive expansion of Newfoundland's road system during the 1950s. Power resigned from cabinet in 1959 and became critical of Smallwood.

Power was twice winner of the O'Leary Newfoundland Poetry Award and endowed the Gregory J. Power Poetry Award, an annual competition at Memorial University of Newfoundland that aims to recognize and encourage young poets. He had a regular column in the newspaper The Evening Telegram.

Power represented Newfoundland in the 1930 British Empire Games placing fifth out of six competitors in the triple jump. Several of his Newfoundland records were never broken prior to the switch to metric distances and as a result, still stand. He was inducted into the Newfoundland Sports Hall of Fame in 1983.

He also owned Mary's Poultry Farms Ltd. With facilities in St. John's, Logy Bay and Dunville, Newfoundland. It was one of the largest egg producing operations in Atlantic Canada.

Power was awarded an honorary doctorate (LL.D.) at the Memorial University of Newfoundland Spring 1995 Convocation.

He died May 15, 1997, in St. John's at the age of 88.

== See also ==
- List of people of Newfoundland and Labrador
- List of communities in Newfoundland and Labrador
