= Perry Canning =

Canadian politician

Perry Canning MHA

Member of the Newfoundland House of Assembly for Labrador West
- In office 22 February 1996 – 9 February 1999
- Preceded by: Alec Snow
- Succeeded by: Randy Collins

Personal details
- Party: Liberal

Perry Canning is a Canadian politician from Newfoundland and Labrador. He was the member of the House of Assembly (MHA) for Labrador West from 1996 to 1999.

== Politics ==
Canning is from Happy Valley-Goose Bay in Labrador. He ran as the Liberal candidate in the riding of Menihek in 1993, but he lost to incumbent Progressive Conservative (PC) MHA Alec Snow. Canning challenged Snow again in the following 1996 election and won in the redistributed riding of Labrador West. While in the House of Assembly, Canning was appointed as the chair of the Resources Committee by Premier Brian Tobin. He was narrowly defeated by New Democratic (NDP) candidate Randy Collins in the 1999 election.

Canning continued to work for the provincial government as an industry advisor in what was criticized by the opposition as a patronage appointment. He later worked for Suncor Energy. In 2017, he was appointed as the Assistant Deputy Minister of Mines within the Department of Natural Resources in the Dwight Ball administration.

== Electoral history ==
1999 Newfoundland general election: Labrador West
Party	Candidate	Votes	%	±%
New Democratic	Randy Collins	2,700	47.84	▲43.82
Liberal	Perry Canning	2,544	45.07	▼16.70
Progressive Conservative	Susan Whitten	400	7.09	▼31.14
Total valid votes		5,644	99.68	
Total rejected ballots		18	0.32	▲0.09
Total votes		5,662	67.84	▼5.57
Eligible voters		8,346		
New Democratic gain from Liberal		Swing		▲30.26

1996 Newfoundland general election: Labrador West
Party	Candidate	Votes	%	±%
Liberal	Perry Canning	3,457	61.77	▲15.77
Progressive Conservative	Alec Snow	2,140	38.23	▼11.75
Total valid votes		5,597	99.77	
Total rejected ballots		13	0.23	▼0.03
Total votes		5,610	73.41	▲0.74
Eligible voters		7,642		
Liberal gain from Progressive Conservative		Swing		▲13.68

1993 Newfoundland general election: Menihek
Party	Candidate	Votes	%	±%
Progressive Conservative	Alec Snow	3,086	49.98	▼3.17
Liberal	Perry Canning	2,840	46.00	▲5.47
New Democratic	Ruth Larson	248	4.02	▼2.30
Total valid votes		6,174	99.74	
Total rejected ballots		16	0.26	
Total votes		6,190	72.67	
Eligible voters		8,518		
Progressive Conservative hold		Swing		▼4.32
