= Felix Collins =

Canadian educator, lawyer, and politician

The Honourable Felix Collins ECNL KC

Attorney General of Newfoundland and Labrador
- In office March 12, 2015 – December 14, 2015
- Preceded by: Judy Manning
- Succeeded by: Andrew Parsons

Minister of Intergovernmental and Aboriginal Affairs of Newfoundland and Labrador
- In office October 19, 2012 – 2014
- Preceded by: Nick McGrath
- Succeeded by: Keith Russell

Minister of Justice and Attorney General of Newfoundland and Labrador
- In office October 2009 – October 19, 2012
- Preceded by: Tom Marshall
- Succeeded by: Darin King

Member of the Newfoundland and Labrador House of Assembly for Placentia - St. Mary's
- In office February 21, 2006 – November 30, 2015
- Preceded by: Fabian Manning
- Succeeded by: Sherry Gambin-Walsh

Personal details
- Born: St. Anne's, Newfoundland and Labrador, Canada
- Party: Progressive Conservative

Felix Collins is a Canadian educator, lawyer and politician from Newfoundland and Labrador, and a former Attorney General. Collins served as the member of the House of Assembly for Placentia—St. Mary’s from 2006 to 2015 for the Progressive Conservatives.

Collins entered cabinet in 2009 being appointed Minister of Justice and Attorney General. In 2012, he became Minister of Intergovernmental and Aboriginal Affairs. The following year Collins left cabinet when his portfolio was merged with other departments, only to re-enter cabinet months later when he was named Attorney General by Premier Tom Marshall. Collins also served as Attorney General in the Davis government. Collins was a notable figure in the Bill 29, Access to Information and Protection of Privacy Act debate in 2012.

== Education ==
Collins graduated from Memorial University of Newfoundland with a Bachelor of Arts degree in education in 1964 and a Bachelor of Arts degree in 1968. He completed his master's degree in education in 1972 at the University of Boston. In 1995, Collins completed a Bachelor of Laws degree from the University of Ottawa.

== Career ==
Collins worked as a school principal, teacher, coordinator and a superintendent of education until retirement in 1992, at which time he entered law school. In April 1996, he was called to the Newfoundland Bar and is a member of the Law Society of Newfoundland, he practiced law in St. John’s until 2007.

== Politics ==
Collins was mayor of the Town of Placentia for sixteen years and a member of the Placentia Council for nineteen years. He was chairperson of the first Joint Councils of the Placentia area and served as Chairperson of the Placentia Area Recreation Commission. He was one of the founding directors of the Placentia Health Care Board, and served eight years as its vice-president. He served six years on the Board of Directors of Marine Atlantic.

In February 2006, Collins was elected to the Newfoundland and Labrador House of Assembly for the District of Placentia—St. Mary’s in a by-election, replacing Fabian Manning who had been removed from the Progressive Conservative caucus. Collins was re-elected in the 2007 provincial election.

Collins is a member of the Progressive Conservative Party and as Member of the House of Assembly (MHA) he served as Deputy Chair of Committees, Chair of the Elections and Privileges Committee, and a Member of the Public Accounts Committee. He has also served as Legislative Advisor to the Minister of Natural Resources and as Commissioner for the St. John’s Urban Region (Agricultural) Development Area Boundary Review. In a cabinet shuffle in October 2009, Premier Danny Williams appointed him to serve as Newfoundland and Labrador's Minister of Justice and Attorney General.

Collins remained Justice Minister and Attorney General under Premier Kathy Dunderdale until October 19, 2012, when he was demoted and became Minister of Intergovernmental and Aboriginal Affairs. Following the 2013, provincial budget, which saw major spending cuts throughout government, it was announced that Collins' cabinet post would be eliminated. Effective June 1, 2013, Premier Dunderdale would take over the Intergovernmental Affairs portfolio, while an Office of Labrador and Aboriginal Affairs would be created. Collins was succeeded by MHA Keith Russell as Labrador and Aboriginal Affairs Minister in 2014.

Collins returned as Attorney General from March 2015 to December 2015 following the removal of Judy Manning.

He did not run for re-election in the 2015 provincial election.

== Election results ==
2011 Newfoundland and Labrador general election
Party	Candidate	Votes	%	±%
Progressive Conservative	Felix Collins	2,516	49.86%	–
NDP	Trish Dodd	1,475	29.23%	
Liberal	Todd Squires	1,055	20.91%	
Total			100.0%	

2007 Newfoundland and Labrador general election
Party	Candidate	Votes	%	±%
Progressive Conservative	Felix Collins	3,086	79.17%	–
NDP	Jennifer Coultas	812	20.83%	
Total		3,098	100.0%	

Newfoundland and Labrador provincial by-election, February 21, 2006: Placentia—St. Mary’s
Party	Candidate	Votes	%
Progressive Conservative	Felix Collins	2,247	46.3
Independent	Nick Careen	1,641	33.8
Liberal	Kevin Power	931	19.2
Newfoundland and Labrador First	Tom Hickey	31	0.6
Total		4,850	
By-election called upon the resignation of Fabian Manning
Source(s) "Results of February 21 by election in Electoral District of Placentia & St. Mary's". Government of Newfoundland and Labrador - Office of the Chief Electoral Officer. Feb 24, 2006.
