= Sherry Gambin-Walsh =

Canadian politician

The Honourable Sherry Gambin-Walsh ECNL MHA

Minister Responsible for Women and Gender Equality
- In office May 9, 2025 – October 29, 2025
- Preceded by: Pam Parsons
- Succeeded by: Helen Conway-Ottenheimer

Member of the Newfoundland and Labrador House of Assembly for Placentia-St. Mary's
- Incumbent
- Assumed office November 30, 2015
- Preceded by: Felix Collins

Minister of Service NL, Minister of the Public Procurement Agency, Minister of Workplace NL, and Minister Responsible for the Government Purchasing Agency of Newfoundland and Labrador
- In office July 31, 2017 – April 3, 2020
- Preceded by: Eddie Joyce
- Succeeded by: Tom Osborne

Minister of Children, Seniors and Social Development of Newfoundland and Labrador
- In office August 17, 2016 – July 31, 2017
- Preceded by: Office Established
- Succeeded by: Lisa Dempster

Minister of Child, Youth and Family Services, Minister of Seniors, Wellness and Social Development, Minister responsible for the NL Housing Corporation, and Minister responsible for the Status of People with Disabilities of Newfoundland and Labrador
- In office December 14, 2015 – August 17, 2016
- Preceded by: Sandy Collins
- Succeeded by: Office Abolished

Personal details
- Party: Liberal
- Occupation: Nurse

Sherry Gambin-Walsh is a Canadian politician, who was elected to the Newfoundland and Labrador House of Assembly in the 2015 provincial election. She represents the electoral district of Placentia-St. Mary's as a member of the Liberal Party. Prior to entering politics, Gambin-Walsh was a nurse.

== Politics ==
Following the 2015 provincial election she served as Minister of Children, Seniors and Social Development until moving to Service NL in a 2017 cabinet shuffle.

In April 2018, Gambin-Walsh confirmed she was one of the MHAs who filed a complaint against Cabinet Minister Eddie Joyce accusing him of bullying and harassment. Joyce was subsequently removed from Cabinet and the Liberal caucus. Other allegations of bullying and harassment followed Gambin-Walsh's and the issue turned into a major political scandal.

She was re-elected in the 2019 provincial election. On April 4, 2020, Gambin-Walsh was removed from cabinet as the RCMP launched a criminal investigation into allegations that she leaked cabinet documents. On September 9, 2020 the RCMP stated that Gambin-Walsh broke cabinet confidentially by leaking information to Paul Didham, a senior police officer with the Royal Newfoundland Constabulary. The RCMP stated that Gambin-Walsh would not be charged criminally as no one benefited from the information; however Premier Furey did not reappoint her to cabinet.

She was re-elected in the 2021 provincial election. On May 9, 2025, she was appointed Minister Responsible for Women and Gender Equality.

Gambin-Walsh was re-elected in the 2025 Newfoundland and Labrador general election.

== Personal life ==
Gambin-Walsh has two children, one of whom is developmentally delayed.

== Electoral record ==
2025 Newfoundland and Labrador general election: Placentia-St. Mary's
Party	Candidate	Votes	%	±%
Liberal	Sherry Gambin-Walsh	2,973	49.9%	-0.95
Progressive Conservative	Rhonda Power	2,470	41.5%	-5.04
Independent	Philip Gardiner	338	5.7%	
New Democratic	Douglas Meggison	176	3.0%	
Total valid votes				
Total rejected ballots				
Turnout				
Eligible voters				
Liberal hold		Swing		+

2021 Newfoundland and Labrador general election: Placentia-St. Mary's
Party	Candidate	Votes	%	±%
Liberal	Sherry Gambin-Walsh	2,552	50.85	+3.45
Progressive Conservative	Calvin Manning	2,336	46.54	+8.04
NL Alliance	Clem J. Whittle	131	2.61	
Total valid votes		5,019		
Total rejected ballots				
Turnout				
Eligible voters				
Liberal hold		Swing		-2.30
Source(s) "Officially Nominated Candidates General Election 2021" (PDF). Elections Newfoundland and Labrador. "NL Election 2021 (Unofficial Results)".

2019 Newfoundland and Labrador general election
Party	Candidate	Votes	%	±%
Liberal	Sherry Gambin-Walsh	2,764	47.4	
Progressive Conservative	Hilda Whelan	2,245	38.5	
Independent	Steve Thorne	824	14.1	
Total valid votes				
Total rejected ballots				
Turnout				
Eligible voters				

2015 Newfoundland and Labrador general election
Party	Candidate	Votes	%	±%
Liberal	Sherry Gambin-Walsh	3,789	66.00	+45.09
Progressive Conservative	Judy Manning	1,751	30.50	-19.36
New Democratic	Peter Beck	197	3.40	-25.83
Total valid votes		5,737	100.0	
Liberal gain		Swing		
