= Joan Cook =

Canadian politician

The Honourable Joan Cook

Senator from Newfoundland and Labrador
- In office March 6, 1998 – October 6, 2009
- Monarch: Elizabeth II
- Prime Minister: Jean Chrétien; Paul Martin; Stephen Harper
- Preceded by: Gerald Ottenheimer
- Succeeded by: Elizabeth Marshall

Personal details
- Born: October 6, 1934 (age 91) English Harbour West, Newfoundland
- Spouse: Widow
- Profession: Businesswoman

Joan Cook (born October 6, 1934) is a past Canadian Senator for Newfoundland and Labrador, serving from 1998 to 2009.

== Biography ==
Cook was born in English Harbour West, then the Dominion of Newfoundland. Cook held several professional roles, including vice-president of her family's automobile dealership, Cook and Jones Motors, executive positions at CJON radio and television, and executive roles at Robert Simpson Eastern Ltd.

Cook was also heavily involved with charitable efforts, chairing fundraising campaigns for Newfoundland's branch of the Canadian Cancer Society. Cook also served on the board of directors for Newfoundland and Labrador's Pottle Center for Mental Health.

After two unsuccessful campaigns as a Liberal candidate in the 1993 and 1996 Newfoundland and Labrador general elections, Cook was appointed to the Senate of Canada by Governor General Roméo LeBlanc on March 6, 1998, on the advice of Liberal Prime Minister Jean Chrétien.

As a senator, Cook served on many committees, such as the senate committee on Fisheries and Oceans. Cook also served as opposition whip of the senate from 2005 to 2007.

Cook retired from the Senate on October 6, 2009, upon reaching the mandatory retirement age for Canadian Senatorss, Cook resigned from her appointment as Newfoundland and Labrador Senator on October 6, 2009.

== Electoral history ==
Signal Hill-Quidi Vidi – 1996 Newfoundland and Labrador general election
Party	Candidate	Votes	%	+/-
New Democratic	Jack Harris	2,800		
Liberal	Joan Cook	1,661		
Progressive Conservative	Cy Mills	902		
Independent	Jason Crummey	120		

St. John's East – 1993 Newfoundland and Labrador general election
Party	Candidate	Votes	%	+/-
New Democratic	Jack Harris	2,336		
Liberal	Joan Cook	1,728		
Progressive Conservative	Sean Fitzgerald	1,285		
