= Placentia-St. Mary's =

Provincial electoral district in Newfoundland and Labrador, Canada

Placentia—St. Mary's
Newfoundland and Labrador electoral district
- Placentia—St. Mary's in relation to other districts in Newfoundland
- Coordinates: 47.249°N 53.587°W

Provincial electoral district
- Legislature: Newfoundland and Labrador House of Assembly
MHA
Sherry Gambin-Walsh
Liberal
- District created: 1995
- First contested: 1996
- Last contested: 2025

Demographics
- Population (2006): 11,115
- Electors (2011): 7,361
- Census subdivision: Placentia

Placentia—St. Mary's is a provincial electoral district for the House of Assembly of Newfoundland and Labrador, Canada. In 2011, there were 7,361 eligible voters living within the district.

Placentia and St. Mary's includes the former U.S. naval base at Argentia, as well as Voisey Bay Nickel's planned processing facility at Long Harbour. Communities include: Admiral's Beach, Angel's Cove, Argentia, Branch, Coote Pond, Colinet, Cuslett, Dunville, Forest Field, Freshwater, Fox Harbour, Gaskiers, Great Barasway, Harricott, Jerseyside, Little Barasway, Mall Bay, Mitchell's Brook, Mount Carmel, New Bridge, North Harbour, O'Donnells, Patrick's Cove, Peter's River, Placentia, Point Verde, Point Le Haye, Point Lance, Riverhead, Ship Cove, Ship Harbour, St. Bride's, St. Catherine's, St. Mary's, St. Joseph's, St. Stephen's, and St. Vincent's.

Placentia and St. Mary's is a Tory stronghold, but many constituents backed rebel MHA Fabian Manning, who was ejected from the PC caucus in 2005 after splitting with Premier Danny Williams on fisheries policies. The district is currently held by Liberal MHA and former Cabinet Minister Sherry Gambin-Walsh.

== Members of the House of Assembly ==
Assembly	Years	Member	Party
Placentia and St. Mary's
29th	1949–1951	Leonard J. Miller	Progressive Conservative
30th	1951–1956	Greg Power	Liberal
Placentia East
31st	1956–1959	Greg Power	Liberal
32nd	1959–1962	Alain Frecker	Liberal
33rd	1962–1966	Alain Frecker	Liberal
34th	1966–1971	Alain Frecker	Liberal
35th	1972	Joseph R. Smallwood	Liberal
36th	1972–1975	Fintan Aylward	Progressive Conservative
37th	1975–1979	William Patterson	Progressive Conservative
38th	1979–1982	William Patterson	Progressive Conservative
39th	1982–1985	William Patterson	Progressive Conservative
40th	1985–1989	William Patterson	Progressive Conservative
41st	1989–1993	William Hogan	Liberal
42nd	1993–1996	Nick Careen	Progressive Conservative
Placentia - St. Mary's
43rd	1996–1999	Anthony Sparrow	Liberal
44th	1999–2003	Fabian Manning	Progressive Conservative
45th	2003–2006	Fabian Manning	Progressive Conservative
45th	2006–2007	Felix Collins	Progressive Conservative
46th	2007–2011	Felix Collins	Progressive Conservative
47th	2011–2015	Felix Collins	Progressive Conservative
48th	2015–2019	Sherry Gambin-Walsh	Liberal
49th	2019–2021	Sherry Gambin-Walsh	Liberal
50th	2021–2025	Sherry Gambin-Walsh	Liberal
51st	2025–Present	Sherry Gambin-Walsh	Liberal

=== Former District of St. Mary's/St. Mary's - The Capes ===
Assembly	Years	Member	Party
St. Mary's
31st	1956–1959	Dr. James McGrath	Liberal
32nd	1959–1961	Dr. James McGrath	Liberal
33rd	1962–1966	Dr. James McGrath	Liberal
34th	1966–1971	Dr. James McGrath	Liberal
35th	1972	Gerald Ottenheimer	Progressive Conservative
36th	1972–1975	Gerald Ottenheimer	Progressive Conservative
St. Mary's - The Capes
37th	1975–1979	Walter C. Carter	Progressive Conservative
38th	1979	Walter C. Carter	Progressive Conservative
38th	1979–1982	Derrick Hancock	Liberal
39th	1982–1985	Loyola Hearn	Progressive Conservative
40th	1985–1989	Loyola Hearn	Progressive Conservative
41st	1989–1993	Loyola Hearn	Progressive Conservative
42nd	1993–1996	Fabian Manning	Progressive Conservative

== Election results ==
Graph of election results (minor parties that never got 2% of the vote or did not run consistently are omitted) View source data.

2025 Newfoundland and Labrador general election
Party	Candidate	Votes	%	±%
Liberal	Sherry Gambin-Walsh	2,973	49.9%	-0.95
Progressive Conservative	Rhonda Power	2,470	41.5%	-5.04
Independent	Philip Gardiner	338	5.7%	
New Democratic	Douglas Meggison	176	3.0%	
Total valid votes				
Total rejected ballots				
Turnout				
Eligible voters				
Liberal hold		Swing		+

2021 Newfoundland and Labrador general election
Party	Candidate	Votes	%	±%
Liberal	Sherry Gambin-Walsh	2,552	50.85	+3.45
Progressive Conservative	Calvin Manning	2,336	46.54	+8.04
NL Alliance	Clem J. Whittle	131	2.61	
Total valid votes		5,019		
Total rejected ballots				
Turnout				
Eligible voters				
Liberal hold		Swing		-2.30
Source(s) "Officially Nominated Candidates General Election 2021" (PDF). Elections Newfoundland and Labrador. "NL Election 2021 (Unofficial Results)".

2019 Newfoundland and Labrador general election
Party	Candidate	Votes	%	±%
Liberal	Sherry Gambin-Walsh	2,764	47.4	
Progressive Conservative	Hilda Whelan	2,245	38.5	
Independent	Steve Thorne	824	14.1	
Total valid votes				
Total rejected ballots				
Turnout				
Eligible voters				

2015 Newfoundland and Labrador general election
Party	Candidate	Votes	%	±%
Liberal	Sherry Gambin-Walsh	3,789	66.00	+45.09
Progressive Conservative	Judy Manning	1,751	30.50	-19.36
New Democratic	Peter Beck	197	3.40	-25.83
Total valid votes		5,737	100.0	
Liberal gain		Swing		

2011 Newfoundland and Labrador general election
Party	Candidate	Votes	%	±%
Progressive Conservative	Felix Collins	2,516	49.86	-29.31
New Democratic	Trish Dodd	1,475	29.23	+9.23
Liberal	Todd Squires	1,055	20.91	+20.91
Total valid votes		5,046	100.0	

2007 Newfoundland and Labrador general election
Party	Candidate	Votes	%	±%
Progressive Conservative	Felix Collins	3,086	79.17	–
NDP	Jennifer Coultas	812	20.83	
Total		3,098	100.0%	

By-election, February 21, 2006 On the resignation of Fabian Manning
Party	Candidate	Votes	%	±%
Progressive Conservative	Felix Collins	2,247	46.3	–
Independent	Nick Careen	1,641	33.8	
Liberal	Kevin Power	931	19.2	
Newfoundland and Labrador First	Tom Hickey	31	0.6	
Total		4,850	100.0%	

2003 Newfoundland and Labrador general election
Party	Candidate	Votes	%	±%
Progressive Conservative	Fabian Manning	3,746	65.60	–
Liberal	Kevin Power	1,812	31.73	
NDP	Janet Stringer	152	2.66	
Total		5,710	100.0%	

1999 Newfoundland and Labrador general election
Party	Candidate	Votes	%	±%
Progressive Conservative	Fabian Manning	3,579	54.8%	–
Liberal	Anthony Sparrow	2,938	45.0%	
Total		6,517	100.0%	

== See also ==
- List of Newfoundland and Labrador provincial electoral districts
- Canadian provincial electoral districts
