= Judy Foote =

Canadian politician (born 1952)

The Honourable Judy Foote PC ONL ECNL
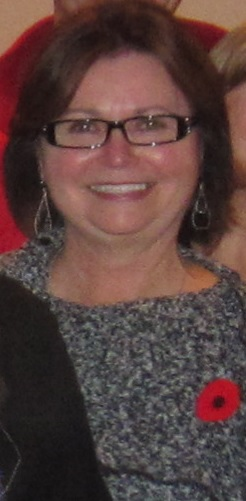

14th Lieutenant Governor of Newfoundland and Labrador
- In office May 3, 2018 – November 14, 2023
- Monarchs: Elizabeth II; Charles III
- Governors General: Julie Payette; Mary Simon
- Premier: Dwight Ball; Andrew Furey
- Preceded by: Frank Fagan
- Succeeded by: Joan Marie Aylward

Minister of Public Services and Procurement Receiver General for Canada
- In office November 4, 2015 – August 24, 2017
- Prime Minister: Justin Trudeau
- Preceded by: Diane Finley
- Succeeded by: Carla Qualtrough

Member of Parliament for Bonavista—Burin—Trinity
- In office October 19, 2015 – September 30, 2017
- Preceded by: first member
- Succeeded by: Churence Rogers

Member of Parliament for Random—Burin—St. George's
- In office October 14, 2008 – August 4, 2015
- Preceded by: Bill Matthews
- Succeeded by: riding dissolved

Member of the Newfoundland and Labrador House of Assembly for Grand Bank
- In office February 22, 1996 – October 9, 2007
- Preceded by: Bill Matthews
- Succeeded by: Darin King

Personal details
- Born: Judy May Crowley; June 23, 1952 (age 74) Grand Bank, Newfoundland, Canada
- Party: Liberal
- Spouse: Howard Foote
- Children: 3
- Education: Memorial University of Newfoundland, Lambton College
- Occupation: Journalist
- Website: www.govhouse.nl.ca

Judy May Foote PC ONL ECNL (née Crowley; born June 23, 1952) is a former Canadian politician who served as the 14th lieutenant governor of Newfoundland and Labrador from 2018 to 2023. She was the first woman to hold the position.

Prior to her appointment as viceregal representative of the King in Right of Newfoundland and Labrador, Foote was the Liberal Member of Parliament for the ridings of Random—Burin—St. George's from 2008 to 2015 and Bonavista—Burin—Trinity from 2015 to 2017. She was the federal Minister of Public Services and Procurement from 2015 until her resignation from cabinet and Parliament for family reasons on August 24, 2017. Before entering federal politics, she represented Grand Bank in the Newfoundland and Labrador House of Assembly from 1996 to 2007 as a member of the Liberal Party.

== Early life ==
Foote was born on June 23, 1952, in Grand Bank, Newfoundland and Labrador. She was the head of the university relations division of the Memorial University of Newfoundland before she entered politics.

== Political career ==
Foote served as the communications director for premier Clyde Wells before she ran for an elected position.

Foote ran in the 1993 provincial election in Grand Bank but lost to Progressive Conservative incumbent Bill Matthews.

Foote represented the electoral district of Grand Bank in the Newfoundland and Labrador House of Assembly from 1996 to 2007 as a member of the Liberal Party.

Foote served in the provincial cabinet as Minister of Development and Rural Renewal from 1996 to 1997, as Minister of Industry, Trade and Technology from 1997 to 1998, as Minister of Education from 1998 to 2000 and from 2001 to 2003. In February 2003, she became Newfoundland's Minister of Industry, Trade and Rural Development in a cabinet shuffle. Foote was narrowly reelected by 43 votes after a recount reduced her initial 50-vote lead in the Newfoundland and Labrador general election in October 2003.

In 2007, Foote stepped down from the House of Assembly after she won the Liberal party nomination for Random—Burin—St. George's against former Newfoundland cabinet minister Oliver Langdon and businessman Roger Jamieson to run in the 2008 federal election. Foote was then elected to the House of Commons of Canada in 2008, succeeding longtime Liberal MP Bill Matthews. In 2009, Foote, along with the other five Liberal MPs from Newfoundland, voted against the 2009 Canadian federal budget because it went against funding promises made to the province in the 1985 Atlantic Accord.

Foote became the Liberal Deputy House Leader in September 2010, but after she was reelected in the 2011 federal election, she accepted the position of Liberal Whip, which she held until the 2015 federal election.

=== Minister of Public Services and Procurement ===
Upon the Liberal victory in 2015, Foote joined the cabinet as Minister of Public Services and Procurement. She received the highest percentage of votes of any candidate nationwide in the 2015 election winning her seat with nearly 82% of all votes. In the House of Commons, Foote was seated next to Justin Trudeau during the Liberal Party's time in Government until her resignation.

In May 2016, Foote appeared alongside premier Dwight Ball to announce that $250 million will be loaned to the provincial government from the federal government to reduce controversial taxes proposed in the provincial budget and Foote also said that more federal help for the province is coming in the future.

Foote was the minister responsible for overseeing the roll-out of the Phoenix pay system in 2016. That system has had serious problems with underpayments and over payments, and the opposition NDP have suggested that Foote take more responsibility for the problems.

On August 24, 2017, following a leave of absence for personal reasons since April 2017, Foote announced she was resigning from the federal cabinet and her seat as an MP because she had learned that she carries the BRCA2 cancer-causing gene and that she had passed it on to her children. However, she said that she was cancer-free at the time and her children were "well."

== Lieutenant governor ==
On March 20, 2018, Prime Minister Justin Trudeau announced the appointment of Foote to succeed Frank Fagan as the Lieutenant Governor of Newfoundland and Labrador. She is the first woman to be appointed as the viceregal representative for the province. Foote was sworn in on May 3, 2018. Foote was succeeded on November 14, 2023 by Joan Marie Aylward.

== Personal life ==
In 2000, Foote was diagnosed with breast cancer while serving as a provincial Member of the House of Assembly for the District of Grand Bank and underwent procedures and treatments. In June 2014, Foote announced that she was battling breast cancer for the second time. Foote suffered a stroke in 2024.

== Electoral record ==
2015 Canadian federal election: Bonavista—Burin—Trinity
Party	Candidate	Votes	%	±%	Expenditures
Liberal	Judy M. Foote	28,704	81.80	+27.33	$40,957.22
Conservative	Mike Windsor	3,534	10.07	–20.43	$7,929.44
New Democratic	Jenn Brown	2,557	7.29	–6.66	$616.65
Green	Tyler John Colbourne	297	0.85	–0.03	–
Total valid votes/expense limit		35,092	100.00		$214,042.22
Total rejected ballots		173	0.49	–	
Turnout		35,265	57.36	–	
Eligible voters		61,475			
Liberal notional hold		Swing		+23.88	
Source: Elections Canada,

2011 federal election redistributed results
Party	Vote	%
Liberal	16,805	54.46
Conservative	9,412	30.50
New Democratic	4,303	13.95
Green	270	0.88
Others	66	0.21

2011 Canadian federal election: Random—Burin—St. George's
Party	Candidate	Votes	%	±%	Expenditures
Liberal	Judy Foote	12,914	49.65	−4.10	
Conservative	John Ottenheimer	8,322	32.00	+11.49	
New Democratic	Stella Magalios	4,465	17.17	−6.60	
Green	Tanya Gutmanis	307	1.18	−0.80	
Total valid votes/expense limit		26,008	100.00	–	
Total rejected ballots		120	0.46	+0.06	
Turnout		26,128	45.80	+4.73	–
Eligible voters		57,047	–	–	

Random—Burin—St. George's – 2008 Canadian federal election
Party	Candidate	Votes	%	±%
Liberal	Judy Foote	12,557	53.7	
New Democratic	Terry White	5,553	23.8	
Conservative	Herb Davis	4,791	20.5	
Green	Kaitlin Wainwright	462	2.0	
Total valid votes		23,363		

Grand Bank – 2003 Newfoundland and Labrador general election
Party	Candidate	Votes	%	±%
Liberal	Judy Foote	3101	49.32%	
Progressive Conservative	Darin King	3058	48.53%	–
NDP	Bill Wakeley	136	2.15%	

Grand Bank – 1999 Newfoundland general election
Party	Candidate	Votes	%	±%
Liberal	Judy Foote	3964		
Progressive Conservative	John Bolt	1146	–	–
NDP	Richard Rennie	538		

1996 Newfoundland general election
Party	Candidate	Votes	%	±%
Liberal	Judy Foote	4136		
Progressive Conservative	Herb Edwards	2521	–	–

1993 Newfoundland and Labrador general election
Party	Candidate	Votes	%	±%
Progressive Conservative	Bill Matthews	3406	–	–
Liberal	Judy Foote	2805		
NDP	Joseph L. Edwards	181		

== Honours and arms ==
=== Honours ===
Ribbon bars of Judy Foote

Appointments

- November 4, 2015: Member of the Queen's Privy Council for Canada (PC)
- May 3, 2018: Member of the Order of Newfoundland and Labrador (ONL)
  - May 3, 2018 – November 14, 2023: Chancellor of the Order of Newfoundland and Labrador (while in office)
- (Canada) May 3, 2018: Dame of Justice of the Most Venerable Order of the Hospital of Saint John of Jerusalem (D.StJ) (Vice-Prior in Newfoundland and Labrador while in office)

Medals

- (Canada) 2002: Queen Elizabeth II Golden Jubilee Medal
- (Canada) 2012: Queen Elizabeth II Diamond Jubilee Medal

==== Honorary military appointments ====
- (Canada) May 3, 2018 – November 14, 2023: Honorary Colonel of the Royal Newfoundland Regiment.
- (Canada) May 3, 2018 – November 14, 2023: Patron of the Canadian Corps of Commissionaires (Newfoundland and Labrador Branch).
- (Newfoundland and Labrador) May 3, 2018 – November 14, 2023: Honorary Chief of Police of the Royal Newfoundland Constabulary.

=== Arms ===
Foote was granted a coat of arms by the Canadian Heraldic Authority through Grant of Arms and Supporters, with differences to Carla Jean Foote, Jason Howard Foote and Heidi Ellen Lee Foote, on May 15, 2019.

Coat of arms of Judy Foote
Granted 2019 Crest A black spruce proper charged with a butterfly Or embellished Azure and flanked by two daffodils all issuant from a rocky mount prope. Escutcheon Azure on a lozenge fesswise conjoined with a fillet cross and a fillet saltire Argent and environed by dog paw prints Or, a boar passant Azure armed and unguled Gules. Supporters Two doves proper each charged on its shoulder with a cross-crosslet Azure, resting its interior claw on a lyre Or set on a closed book lying flat its spine outwards and standing on a rocky mount set with grass proper and issuant from a bar wavy Azure. Motto MIND OVER BODY

29th Canadian Ministry (2015–2025) – Cabinet of Justin Trudeau
Cabinet post (1)
Predecessor	Office	Successor
Diane Finley	Minister of Public Services and Procurement; November 4, 2015 – August 24, 2017	Carla Qualtrough
