= William G. Patterson =

Canadian politician

William G. "Bill" Patterson (1915 – July 7, 2000) was a welder and politician in Newfoundland. He represented Placentia in the Newfoundland House of Assembly from 1975 to 1989.

The son of William Patterson and Annie Greene, he was born in Placentia. Patterson married Mary Collins. He first worked as a welder at the naval base in Argentia before opening his own welding business.

He ran unsuccessfully for a seat in the Newfoundland assembly in 1959 and several times more before being elected in 1975. He led the fight against the closure of the Argentia Traffic Control Centre between 1984 and 1986 which led to the federal and provincial governments sharing the operating costs of the centre. Patterson was defeated when he ran for reelection in 1989 and returned to his business interests.

He died at the age of 85.
