= Nick Careen =

Canadian politician

- Born: Point Lance, Newfoundland and Labrador, Canada
- Occupation: Politician

Nick Careen is a Newfoundland and Labrador politician. He was elected to Newfoundland and Labrador's provincial House of Assembly in the 1993 Newfoundland general election as a Progressive Conservative. He represented Placentia District from 1993 to 1996.

Careen also unsuccessfully ran as an Independent candidate in the February 2006 by-election in Placentia—St. Mary’s. He placed second winning 1,641 votes.

In January 2007, he was appointed to the board of directors of Marine Atlantic.

== Election results (partial) ==
Newfoundland and Labrador provincial by-election, February 21, 2006: Placentia—St. Mary’s
Party	Candidate	Votes	%
Progressive Conservative	Felix Collins	2,247	46.3
Independent	Nick Careen	1,641	33.8
Liberal	Kevin Power	931	19.2
Newfoundland and Labrador First	Tom Hickey	31	0.6
Total		4,850	
By-election called upon the resignation of Fabian Manning
Source(s) "Results of February 21 by election in Electoral District of Placentia & St. Mary's". Government of Newfoundland and Labrador - Office of the Chief Electoral Officer. Feb 24, 2006.
