= Tom Murphy (Newfoundland politician) =

Canadian politician (1937–2018)

MHA for St. John's South
- In office 1989–1996
- Preceded by: John Collins
- Succeeded by: Tom Osborne

Minister of Employment and Labour Relations
- In office August 26, 1994 – January 26, 1996
- Preceded by: Roger Grimes
- Succeeded by: Office Abolished

Personal details
- Born: May 3, 1937
- Died: August 29, 2018 (aged 81)

Thomas J. Murphy (May 3, 1937 – August 29, 2018) was a Canadian politician from Newfoundland. He represented St. John's South in the Newfoundland House of Assembly from 1989 to 1996.

The son of Richard Murphy, he was born in St. John's and was educated at Saint Mary's University. In 1981, Murphy married Gloria Grimes. Murphy was president of the Canadian Society of Safety Engineering.

Murphy was elected to the Newfoundland assembly in 1989, winning by only two votes; he was reelected in 1993. He was defeated by Tom Osborne when he ran for reelection in 1996.

From August 26, 1994 to January 26, 1996, he was the Minister of Employment and Labour Relations.
