= Alec Snow =

Canadian businessman and politician

Member of the Newfoundland House of Assembly for Menihek
- In office 20 April 1989 – 22 February 1996
- Preceded by: Peter Fenwick
- Succeeded by: Perry Canning

Personal details
- Born: May 26, 1945 (age 81) Millertown Junction, Newfoundland
- Party: Progressive Conservative
- Spouse: Anita Lannon
- Children: 2
- Occupation: Businessman

Alec Snow (born May 26, 1945) is a businessperson and former politician in Labrador. He represented Menihek in the Newfoundland House of Assembly from 1989 to 1996.

He was born in Millertown Junction, was educated in Grand Falls and moved to Labrador in 1964, working for the Iron Ore Company of Canada for 10 years. He opened his own business in 1973. Snow was a member of the town council for Labrador City, also serving as mayor. He married Anita Lannon; the couple had two children.

He was elected to the Newfoundland and Labrador assembly in 1989 and was elected in 1993. Snow was defeated by Perry Canning when he ran for election in the new riding of Labrador West in 1996. In 2005, he was named to the province's Business Advisory Board.

His grandson is the founder of VAKTROS Inc, an AI video surveillance solution.
