= John Efford =

Canadian politician (1944–2022)

The Honourable John Efford PC

Member of Parliament for Avalon Bonavista—Trinity—Conception (2002-2004)
- In office May 13, 2002 – January 23, 2006
- Preceded by: Brian Tobin
- Succeeded by: Fabian Manning

Member of the Newfoundland and Labrador House of Assembly for Port de Grave
- In office April 2, 1985 – March 28, 2001
- Preceded by: Randy W. Collins
- Succeeded by: Roland Butler

Minister of Energy and Natural Resources
- In office December 12, 2003 – September 25, 2005
- Preceded by: Herb Dhaliwal
- Succeeded by: John McCallum

Personal details
- Born: Ruben John Efford; January 6, 1944 Port de Grave, Dominion of Newfoundland
- Died: January 2, 2022 (aged 77) Carbonear, Newfoundland and Labrador, Canada
- Party: Liberal
- Occupation: Businessman

Ruben John Efford PC (January 6, 1944 – January 2, 2022) was a Canadian politician. He first served as a member of the Newfoundland and Labrador House of Assembly (MHA) from 1985 to 2001, representing Port de Grave electoral district and also serving as cabinet minister of various portfolios. After losing the 2001 leadership convention of the Liberal Party of Newfoundland and Labrador, he went into federal politics and served as a Member of Parliament (MP) from 2002 until 2006 for the Liberal Party of Canada. He initially represented Bonavista—Trinity—Conception, before switching to Avalon after electoral redistribution prior to the 2004 federal election.

== Early life ==
Ruben John Efford was born on January 6, 1944, in Port de Grave, Newfoundland and Labrador, the son of Reuben John and Diana Efford. He completed high school in his hometown, before doing a business administration program. He went on to become the owner and operator of Efford’s Wholesale, Snow's Plumbing Ltd and the Della Lee retail clothing store. He joined and actively participated in the Liberal Party of Newfoundland and Labrador during the early 1960s. He was elected to the District Liberal Association in 1969 and eventually became its vice-president.

== Provincial politics ==
Efford entered provincial politics in 1985, running in the election that year for the provincial Liberals. He was elected to the House of Assembly, representing the riding of Port de Grave. He was initially Opposition critic for consumer affairs, public works, fisheries, health and social services. He later served as minister of social services, minister of works, services and transportation, and minister of fisheries and aquaculture after the Liberals won the 1989 provincial election.

A founding member and chairperson of the United Fisherpersons of Newfoundland and Labrador, Efford opposed the federal cod moratorium that impacted the province's economy. He accompanied Newfoundlander fish harvesters to Nathan Phillips Square in Toronto to protest the measure and argued for their rights to fish. In his capacity as fisheries minister from 1996 to 2000, Efford was a strong proponent of seal hunting, which was given conditional support from the federal government's fishery advisory committee – consisting of representatives from the industry and academia – as well as the House of Commons' fisheries committee. He was perturbed by some students and scientists at Memorial University of Newfoundland who wrote to the federal fisheries minister requesting that the latter delay increasing the seal quota until a complete scientific review was conducted. Efford was of the opinion that they were undermining his efforts.

Efford ultimately served as a MHA from 1985 to 2001. He lost the 2001 leadership convention to become Liberal party leader to Roger Grimes by 14 votes in a divisive contest. Despite Grimes offering him a senior cabinet position, both Efford and fellow leadership contestant Paul Dicks subsequently left provincial politics, maintaining that they could not work with Grimes.

== Federal politics ==
Efford was elected to the House of Commons in a by-election in May 2002 and was re-elected in the 2004 general election. He was appointed Minister of Natural Resources in December 2003 and served in that role until February 2006. During his tenure, the federal government came to a new agreement on the Atlantic Accord with the provincial government of Newfoundland and Labrador. He also served as a member of the standing committees on Canadian Heritage, Fisheries and Oceans, on the standing committees of Human Resources Development, Status of Persons with Disabilities, Aboriginal Affairs, and Northern Development and Natural Resources.

== Retirement ==
After considerable speculation that he intended to resign his federal cabinet position due to ill-health, Efford announced on September 1, 2005, to much surprise, that he had no intention to resign. He later stated on NTV that he would not run again in the 2006 federal election or run for the leadership of the Newfoundland Liberal Party. In November 2005, it was reported that Efford was retiring from politics due to poor health from diabetes.

In February 2011, Efford criticized the leadership of provincial Liberal Leader Yvonne Jones and called for her to consider resigning. Efford stated that her low poll numbers were the main reason for his request. He referenced a Telelink poll released that week by NTV, in which 11 percent of respondents said they would prefer Jones to lead the province. Jones responded by saying Efford was an absolute nuisance to the Newfoundland and Labrador Liberal party, and another poll done in March showed that Jones' popularity was now up to 18% from the 11% that the February poll showed.

== Personal life ==
Efford was married to Madonna until his death. Together, they had three children: Jacqueline Ann, John III and Joseph Lee.

Efford revealed in 2019 that he had been battling Alzheimer's disease for two years. He died on January 2, 2022, at a hospital in Carbonear, four days shy of his 78th birthday.

== Electoral history ==
2004 Canadian federal election: Avalon
Party	Candidate	Votes	%	±%	Expenditures
Liberal	R. John Efford	18,335	58.34	+12.41	$47,245
Conservative	Rick Dalton	9,211	29.31	-10.37	$50,104
New Democratic	Michael Kehoe	3,450	10.98	-3.24	$2,472
Green	Don C. Ferguson	430	1.37	–	$746
Total valid votes/expense limit		31,246	100.0	–	$74,947
Total rejected, declined and unmarked ballots		336	1.06		
Turnout		31,762	49.83		
Eligible voters		63,745			
Liberal notional hold		Swing		+11.39	
Changes from 2000 are based on redistributed results. Change for the Conservatives is from the combined totals of the Progressive Conservatives and the Canadian Alliance.

By-election on May 13, 2002 On Brian Tobin's resignation, January 25, 2002
Party	Candidate	Votes
Liberal	John Efford	18,665
Progressive Conservative	Michelle Brazil	5,281
New Democratic	Jim Gill	588
Alliance	David Tulett	166
Green	Christopher John Bradshaw	139
Independent	Brent Rockwood	106

1999 Newfoundland and Labrador general election
Party	Candidate	Votes	%	±%
Liberal	John Efford	4488		
Progressive Conservative	Paul Cooper	1026	–	–
NDP	Steve Quigley	185		

Parliament of Canada
Preceded by Brian Tobin, Liberal	Member of Parliament from Bonavista—Trinity—Conception; 2002–2004	Succeeded by district abolished
Preceded by district created	Member of Parliament from Avalon; 2004–2006	Succeeded by Fabian Manning, Conservative
