= Fabian Manning =

Canadian politician

The Honourable Fabian Manning
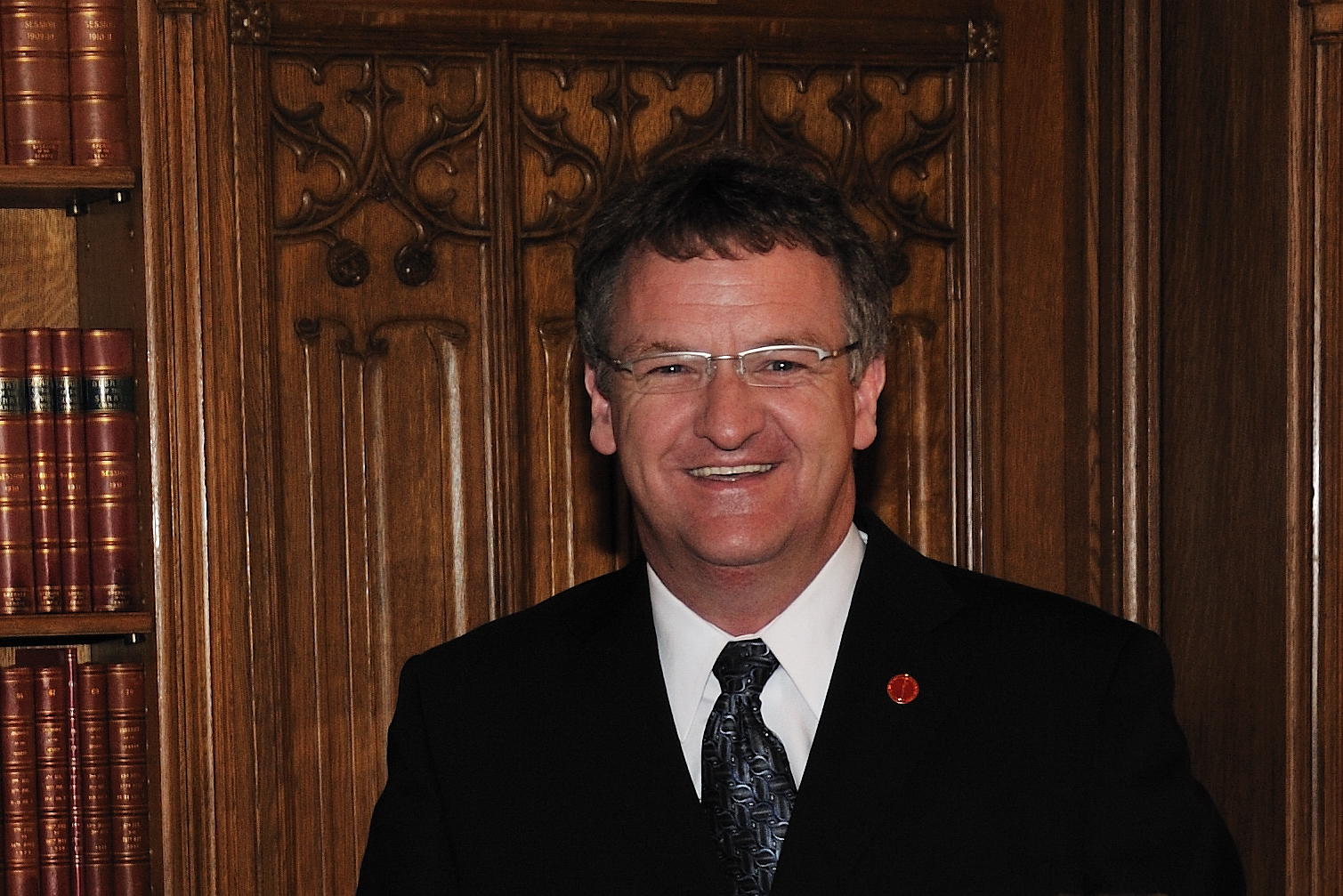
- Manning in 2010

Canadian Senator from Newfoundland and Labrador
- Incumbent
- Assumed office May 25, 2011
- Nominated by: Stephen Harper
- Appointed by: David Johnston
- Preceded by: Himself
- In office January 2, 2009 – March 28, 2011
- Nominated by: Stephen Harper
- Appointed by: Michaëlle Jean
- Preceded by: C. William Doody
- Succeeded by: Himself

Member of Parliament for Avalon
- In office January 23, 2006 – October 14, 2008
- Preceded by: John Efford
- Succeeded by: Scott Andrews

Member of the Newfoundland and Labrador House of Assembly for Placentia—St. Mary's (St. Mary's—The Capes; 1993–1996)
- In office February 9, 1999 – December 25, 2005
- Preceded by: Anthony Sparrow
- Succeeded by: Felix Collins (2006)
- In office May 3, 1993 – February 22, 1996
- Preceded by: Loyola Hearn
- Succeeded by: Anthony Sparrow

Personal details
- Born: May 21, 1964 (age 61) St. Bride's, Newfoundland and Labrador, Canada
- Party: Conservative
- Other political affiliations: Progressive Conservative (2006–present); Progressive Conservative Party of Newfoundland and Labrador (1993–2005); Independent Progressive Conservative (2005)
- Spouse: Sandra (Dohey) Manning
- Profession: Politician

Fabian Manning (born May 21, 1964) is a politician in Newfoundland and Labrador, Canada. Manning served as a Progressive Conservative and later as the independent Member of the House of Assembly for the district of Placentia and St. Mary’s from 1999 to 2005. From 2006 to 2008 he was the Conservative Party of Canada Member of Parliament for the riding of Avalon. After his defeat in the 2008 federal election Manning was appointed to the Senate of Canada on January 2, 2009, he resigned his Senate seat on March 28, 2011, to run for election in his former riding of Avalon in the 2011 federal election, but was unsuccessful. Prime Minister Stephen Harper re-appointed Manning to the Senate on May 25, 2011.

== Early political career ==
Born in St. Bride's, Manning served on that town's council for three terms. He was also a lead figure for the Cape Shore Regional Development Association. In 1993, he was elected to the Newfoundland and Labrador House of Assembly as a Progressive Conservative representing the riding of St. Mary's-The Capes. In 1996, Manning was defeated in the redistributed riding of Placentia and St. Mary's by Anthony Sparrow, but he successfully sought election there in 1999.

In May 2005, he was voted out of the provincial Progressive Conservative caucus because he publicly attacked the government's crab management policies. He sat as an Independent Progressive Conservative member for the rest of his term. When he was a member of the opposition, Manning served as the critic for the Ministers of Tourism, Culture, and Recreation; Employment and Labour; Government Services and Lands; Human Resources and Employment; and Youth Services and post secondary education. He was the Parliamentary Assistant to the Leader of the Opposition, a member of the Progressive Conservative Caucus Strategy Committee, and a member of the Public Accounts Committee.

== Member of Parliament ==
In December 2005, after having been ejected from the provincial Progressive Conservative caucus, Manning resigned his seat in the House of Assembly to pursue a seat in the House of Commons of Canada. Avalon had previously been represented by John Efford, a Liberal cabinet minister, who had been elected by a wide margin in 2004. Without the powerful incumbent, however, Manning was able to take the seat for the federal Conservatives in the 2006 federal election with 51.55% of the vote.

Manning spoke in favour of the federal government's 2007 budget, saying, "Our government has kept its commitment to honor and respect the Atlantic Accord." The provincial government of Newfoundland and Labrador and Premier Danny Williams in particular have opposed the budget which contains revisions to a previously agreed upon equalization formula.

In late August 2007, he attacked the Liberal environmental plan as making the Hebron offshore oil megaproject "dead on arrival." Scott Simms, a Liberal MP from central Newfoundland, rejected Manning's accusations, insisting that the Hebron project would not be cancelled. He also suggested that Manning's comments had more to do with attempting to increase support for Stephen Harper (who was in a dispute with Premier Danny Williams), and reviving support for the Conservative party, which had dipped to only 17% of voters.

As part of the Conservative caucus, he was a member of the Standing Committee on Fisheries and Oceans, Chair of Atlantic Caucus and the Standing Joint Committee on the Library of Parliament.

Manning ran for re-election in Avalon in the October 2008 election and was defeated by Liberal Scott Andrews.

== Appointments to Senate ==
Manning was selected by Stephen Harper for appointment to the Senate on January 2, 2009. Manning resigned his seat in the Senate on March 28, 2011, to run in that year's federal election in a bid to retake the same seat he had lost in 2008. Manning's bid for the riding of Avalon was unsuccessful.

On May 18, 2011, Prime Minister Stephen Harper announced that Manning was to be re-appointed to the Senate. The Prime Minister followed through with that intention. Manning as a senator for Newfoundland and Labrador is also a member of the Fisheries and Oceans committee and the National Security and Defence committee.

Manning endorsed Peter Mackay in the 2020 Conservative Party of Canada leadership election.

On February 21, 2023, Manning's nephew, Eugene Manning, announced his candidacy in the 2023 NL PC leadership election. Eugene Manning narrowly lost to Tony Wakeham.

== Election results ==
2011 Canadian federal election: Avalon
Party	Candidate	Votes	%	±%	Expenditures
Liberal	Scott Andrews	16,008	43.97	-1.31	$71,517.62
Conservative	Fabian Manning	14,749	40.51	+5.35	$85,098.25
New Democratic	Matthew Martin Fuchs	5,157	14.16	-3.22	$3,735.98
Independent	Randy Wayne Dawe	276	0.76	–	$1,060.00
Green	Matt Crowder	218	0.60	-1.57	$11.96
Total valid votes/expense limit		36,408	100.0	–	$85,411.40
Total rejected, declined and unmarked ballots		166	0.45	-0.34	
Turnout		36,574	56.77	+4.97	
Eligible voters		64,424			
Liberal hold		Swing		-3.33	

2008 Canadian federal election: Avalon
Party	Candidate	Votes	%	±%	Expenditures
Liberal	Scott Andrews	14,866	45.28	+6.70	$68,253
Conservative	Fabian Manning	11,542	35.16	-16.39	$54,159
New Democratic	Randy Wayne Dawe	5,707	17.38	+8.31	$25,080
Green	Dave Aylward	714	2.17	+1.37	$766
Total valid votes/expense limit		32,829	100.0	–	$82,453
Total rejected, declined and unmarked ballots		262	0.79	-0.86	
Turnout		33,091	51.80	-7.81	
Eligible voters		63,882			
Liberal gain from Conservative		Swing		+11.54	

2006 Canadian federal election: Avalon
Party	Candidate	Votes	%	±%	Expenditures
Conservative	Fabian Manning	19,132	51.55	+22.24	$71,141
Liberal	Bill Morrow	14,318	38.58	-19.76	$71,528
New Democratic	Eugene Conway	3,365	9.07	-1.91	$1,036
Green	Shannon Hillier	297	0.80	-0.57	none listed
Total valid votes/expense limit		37,112	100.0	–	$76,596
Total rejected, declined and unmarked ballots		623	1.65	+0.59	
Turnout		37,735	59.61	+9.78	
Eligible voters		63,303			
Conservative gain from Liberal		Swing		+21.00	

2003 Newfoundland and Labrador general election
Party	Candidate	Votes	%	±%
Progressive Conservative	Fabian Manning	3,746	65.60	–
Liberal	Kevin Power	1,812	31.73	
NDP	Janet Stringer	152	2.66	
Total		5,710	100.0%	

1999 Newfoundland and Labrador general election
Party	Candidate	Votes	%	±%
Progressive Conservative	Fabian Manning	3,579	54.8%	–
Liberal	Anthony Sparrow	2,938	45.0%	
Total		6,517	100.0%	
