= Humber West =

Former provincial electoral district in Newfoundland and Labrador, Canada

Newfoundland and Labrador electoral district
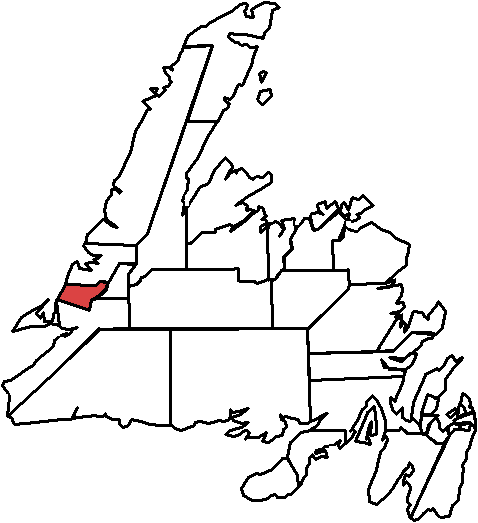
- Humber West in relation to other districts in Newfoundland

Defunct provincial electoral district
- Legislature: Newfoundland and Labrador House of Assembly
- District created: 1971
- First contested: 1971
- Last contested: 2011

Demographics
- Population (2006): 10,201
- Electors (2011): 8,403

Humber West is a defunct provincial electoral district for the House of Assembly of Newfoundland and Labrador, Canada. In 2011, there were 8,403 eligible voters living within the district.

The district includes the western part of Corner Brook, as well as the communities of Gallants, George's Lake, Pinchgut Lake, and Spruce Brook. The district has elected a member of the governing party in every election since confederation, with the exception of future premier Danny Williams' by-election win two years before he led his Progressive Conservative Party to power.

The seat has been held by three former premiers of the province. From 2001 to 2010, premier Williams held the seat. From 1971 to 1979, the seat was represented by premier Frank Moores. Finally, from 1966 to 1971, the seat was held by Joey Smallwood.

The riding voted for the party to form government in every election since Newfoundland became a province in 1949.

The district was abolished in 2015; it was succeeded by the new district of Corner Brook.

== Members of the House of Assembly ==
The district has elected the following members of the House of Assembly:

Member	Party	Term
Vaughn Granter	Progressive Conservative	2011–2015
Danny Williams	Progressive Conservative	2001–2010
Paul Dicks	Liberal	1989–2001
Ray Baird	Progressive Conservative	1979–1989
Frank Moores	Progressive Conservative	1971–1979
Joseph R. Smallwood	Liberal	1966–1971
Charles H. Ballam	Liberal	1949–1966

== Election results ==
2011 Newfoundland and Labrador general election
Party	Candidate	Votes	%	±%
Progressive Conservative	Vaughn Granter	2335	59.38%	–
Liberal	Donna Luther	833	21.19%	
NDP	Jordan Stringer	764	19.43%	

}

By-Election — February 15, 2011 On the resignation of Danny Williams, December 3, 2010
Party	Candidate	Votes	%	±%
Progressive Conservative	Vaughn Granter	2109	63.58%	–
Liberal	Mark Watton	1097	33.06%	
NDP	Rosie Myers	112	3.38%	

2007 Newfoundland and Labrador general election
Party	Candidate	Votes	%	±%
Progressive Conservative	Danny Williams	3755	87.92%	–
Liberal	Maurice Budgell	516	12.08%	

2003 Newfoundland and Labrador general election
Party	Candidate	Votes	%	±%
Progressive Conservative	Danny Williams	3823	68.72%	–
Liberal	Edward Buckle	1533	27.56%	
NDP	Matthew Robbins	207	3.72%	

}

By-election, 2001 On the resignation of Paul Dicks
Party	Candidate	Votes	%	±%
Progressive Conservative	Danny Williams	3606	72.01%	–
Liberal	June Alteen	1215	24.26%	
NDP	Kris Watton	186	3.71%	

1999 Newfoundland and Labrador general election
Party	Candidate	Votes	%	±%
Liberal	Paul Dicks	2814	58.40%	
Progressive Conservative	Pat Callahan	1152	23.91%	–
NDP	Paul Bourgeois	852	17.68%	

== See also ==
- List of Newfoundland and Labrador provincial electoral districts
- Canadian provincial electoral districts

Newfoundland and Labrador House of Assembly
Preceded by Exploits	Constituency represented by the premier of Newfoundland and Labrador; 2003-2010	Succeeded by Virginia Waters
