= Lloyd Snow =

Canadian politician

Speaker of the Newfoundland and Labrador House of Assembly
- In office 1995–2003
- Preceded by: Paul Dicks
- Succeeded by: Harvey Hodder

Member of the House of Assembly for Trinity-Bay de Verde
- In office 1989–2003
- Preceded by: James Reid
- Succeeded by: Charlene Johnson

Personal details
- Born: January 5, 1943 (age 83) Victoria, Dominion of Newfoundland
- Party: Liberal
- Spouse: Linda Mansfield
- Education: Memorial University
- Occupation: Teacher

Lloyd Snow (born January 5, 1943) is an educator and former political figure in Newfoundland and Labrador, Canada. He represented Trinity-Bay de Verde in the Newfoundland and Labrador House of Assembly from 1989 to 2003 as a Liberal.

He was born in Victoria, the son of Arthur Snow, and was educated in Brownsdale and at Memorial University. Snow was an elementary school principal and high school teacher and vice-principal. In 1967, he married Linda Mansfield. Snow was mayor of Hant's Harbour. He served as speaker for the provincial assembly from 1995 to 2003.
