= Oliver Langdon =

Canadian politician

The Honourable Oliver Langdon ECNL

Member of the Newfoundland and Labrador House of Assembly for Fortune Bay-Hermitage
- In office April 20, 1989 – February 22, 1996
- Preceded by: Roger Simmons
- Succeeded by: Electoral district dissolved

Member of the Newfoundland and Labrador House of Assembly for Fortune Bay-Cape La Hune
- In office February 22, 1996 – October 9, 2007
- Preceded by: Electoral district created
- Succeeded by: Tracey Perry

Minister of Environment and Labour
- In office July 4, 1997 – February 13, 2001

Minister of Municipal and Provincial Affairs, And Registrar General
- In office February 13, 2001 – November 6, 2003

Personal details
- Born: Seal Cove, Fortune Bay, Newfoundland
- Party: Liberal (-1989, 1993-) Progressive Conservative (1989-1993)
- Education: Memorial University
- Profession: Teacher, Firefighter

Oliver Langdon is an educator and former political figure in Newfoundland and Labrador. He represented Fortune Bay-Cape La Hune in the Newfoundland and Labrador House of Assembly from 1989 to 2007 as a Progressive Conservative and then Liberal member.

He was born in Seal Cove, Fortune Bay and educated at Memorial University. Langdon married Margaret Loveless. He served in the provincial cabinet as Minister of Environment and Labour and as Minister of Municipal and Provincial Affairs. Langdon was a member of the town council for Point Leamington.

First elected as a Progressive Conservative in 1989, Langdon ran as a Liberal in 1993, and beat Progressive Conservative candidate and future Premier of Newfoundland and Labrador, Kathy Dunderdale. He resigned from provincial politics in 2007; Langdon lost to Judy Foote when he sought the Liberal candidacy in the federal riding of Random–Burin–St. George's in August 2007.
