= Paul Shelley (politician) =

Canadian politician

The Honourable Paul Shelley ECNL

Member of the House of Assembly for Baie Verte
- In office May 3, 1993 – July, 2007
- Preceded by: Harold Small
- Succeeded by: Tom Rideout

Minister of Tourism, Culture, And Recreation
- In office November 6, 2003 – November 8, 2005
- Preceded by: Julie Bettney
- Succeeded by: Tom Hedderson

Minister of Human Resources, Labour, And Employment, Minister Responsible for the Labour relations Agency, Minister Responsible for Labrador Affairs, And Minister Responsible for the NL Housing Corporation
- In office November 8, 2005 – January 19, 2007
- Preceded by: Joan Shea
- Succeeded by: Shawn Skinner

Personal details
- Born: July 11, 1959 (age 67) Baie Verte

Paul J. Shelley (born July 11, 1959) is a former political figure in Newfoundland and Labrador, Canada. He represented Baie Verte-Springdale in the Newfoundland and Labrador House of Assembly from 1993 to 2007 as a Progressive Conservative.

He was born in Baie Verte, the son of William Shelley, and was educated at Memorial University. Shelley worked in construction from 1977 to 1981, was technical director of the Newfoundland and Labrador Basketball Association from 1986 to 1987 and taught school in Baie Verte from 1987 to 1989. Shelley married Beverly Whitten. He served in the provincial cabinet as Minister Tourism, Culture and Recreation and Minister of Human Resources, Labour and Employment. Shelley resigned his seat in July 2007, citing family reasons.
