= Melvin Penney =

Canadian pharmacist and politician

Melvin Lorne Penney (born 1946) is a pharmacist and former politician in Newfoundland. He represented Lewisporte in the Newfoundland House of Assembly from 1989 to 1999.

The son of Arthur Penney and Hazel Coish, he was born in Indian Islands and was educated there and in Lewisporte. He received his qualifications as a pharmacist and worked at a drug store in Lewisporte. In 1975, he opened his own drug store. Penney married Marion Paynter.

He was elected to the Newfoundland assembly in 1989 and was reelected in 1993 and 1996. Penney was defeated by Tom Rideout when he ran for reelection in 1999.
