= Roger Grimes =

Canadian politician

The Honourable Roger Grimes CM ECNL
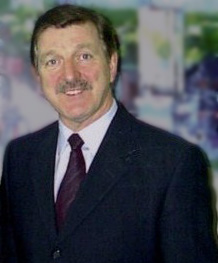

8th Premier of Newfoundland and Labrador
- In office February 13, 2001 – November 6, 2003
- Monarch: Elizabeth II
- Lieutenant Governor: Arthur Maxwell House; Edward Moxon Roberts
- Preceded by: Beaton Tulk
- Succeeded by: Danny Williams

Leader of the Liberal Party of Newfoundland and Labrador
- In office February 3, 2001 – May 30, 2005
- Preceded by: Beaton Tulk
- Succeeded by: Gerry Reid

Member of the Newfoundland and Labrador House of Assembly for Exploits
- In office April 20, 1989 – May 30, 2005
- Preceded by: Hugh Twomey
- Succeeded by: Clayton Forsey

Personal details
- Born: May 2, 1950 (age 76) Grand Falls-Windsor, Newfoundland, Canada
- Party: Liberal Party
- Spouse: Mary Ann Lewis
- Education: Memorial University, B.S., B.Ed., M.Ed.

Roger D. Grimes CM ECNL (born May 2, 1950) is a Canadian politician from Newfoundland and Labrador. Grimes was born and raised in the central Newfoundland town of Grand Falls-Windsor.

Grimes is a former leader of the province's Liberal Party and was its eighth premier from February 2001 until November 2003.

A teacher by profession, Grimes was elected president of the Newfoundland and Labrador Teachers’ Association in 1985, a position he held for two years.

== Politics ==
In 1989, Grimes was elected to the House of Assembly representing Exploits district.

Grimes entered the cabinet of Premier Clyde Wells in 1991 as Minister of Employment and Labour Relations, followed by service as Minister of Tourism, Culture and Recreation. Under Premier Brian Tobin, Grimes was by now a senior Minister and served in the portfolios of Education, Mines and Energy, and Health and Community Servies.

=== 2001 NL Liberal Leadership Convention ===
Grimes won the 2001 Liberal Party of Newfoundland and Labrador Leadership to become Party Leader, defeating John Efford by 14 votes in a fierce and divisive contest in Mount Pearl. Efford and fellow leadership contestant Paul Dicks subsequently left provincial politics saying they could not work under the leadership of Grimes.

=== Premier of Newfoundland and Labrador ===
Grimes was sworn in as Premier on February 13, 2001. The same year he became Premier, the name of the province was officially changed to Newfoundland and Labrador.

In 2002, Grimes called for a review of the Act of Union by which the province had become a part of Canada and on July 2, 2003, the findings of the Royal Commission on Renewing and Strengthening Our Place in Canada were released. It noted the following stressors in the relationship between the province and Canada:

- The huge impact on the province by the destruction of the cod stocks.
- Hydroelectricity resources in Labrador have primarily benefited Quebec.
- Chronically high unemployment; the highest in Canada.
- Lowest per-capita income in Canada.
- The highest tax rates in the country.
- The most out-migration of any province in Canada.

The report called for:

- more collaborative federalism;
- an action team to deal with the fishery in waters surrounding Newfoundland;
- collaboration between Canada, Quebec, and Newfoundland and Labrador on the development of the Gull Island hydro site on the lower part of the Churchill River;
- revision of the Atlantic Accord, negotiated by the provincial and federal governments in the 1980s, to ensure that offshore oil and gas royalties primarily benefit the province (this recommendation was one of the earliest priorities of Grimes' successor, Danny Williams);
- immediate and realistic negotiations on joint management of the fishery.

Also in 2003, the federal government declared a moratorium on the last remaining cod fishery in Atlantic Canada in the Gulf of St. Lawrence. Newfoundland and Labrador was again the most directly affected province. As Grimes was dealing with this issue, and others facing the province, time was soon running out on his tenure.

Despite his attempts to strike an image as a fresh government, Grimes and his Liberals were defeated in the October 2003 provincial election by the Progressive Conservatives under Danny Williams, bringing an end to 14 years of Liberal rule in Newfoundland and Labrador.

== Retirement and later life ==
On May 30, 2005, Grimes resigned the seat he had held in the legislature for 16 years and stepped down as the leader of the Liberal Party of Newfoundland and Labrador. He is quoted as saying that the time was right for him to retire from provincial politics. Gerry Reid became interim leader after Grimes announced his retirement.

In March 2011, the provincial Liberals held their first fundraiser of the year. The event was a roast of Grimes, called “Grimes and Punishment” and was held in St. John's.

Grimes was critical of the Lower Churchill Project and fellow Liberal Premier Dwight Ball. In June 2016, he was banned from the Capital Hyundai Arena after he made negative comments about the former Chair of Nalcor's Board of Directors, Ken Marshall (who had been involved in a scandal regarding payments from the provincial government). Marshall's brother, Steve Marshall, is the owner of the rink and made the decision following Grimes's comments.

Grimes was appointed to the Canada-Newfoundland Offshore Petroleum Board for a six-year term effective April 10, 2018.

== Honours ==
- Canadian Version of the Queen Elizabeth II Golden Jubilee Medal (2002).
- Canadian Version of the Queen Elizabeth II Diamond Jubilee Medal (2012).
- Member of the Order of Canada (CM) 22 November 2019.
