= Doug Oldford =

Canadian politician (1948–2024)

MHA for Trinity North
- In office 1991–2000
- Preceded by: Barry Hynes
- Succeeded by: Ross Wiseman

Personal details
- Born: June 29, 1948 Bonavista, Newfoundland
- Died: April 25, 2024 (aged 75) Clarenville, Newfoundland and Labrador
- Party: Liberal Party of Newfoundland and Labrador
- Occupation: business administrator

Douglas Oldford (June 29, 1948 – April 25, 2024) was a Canadian politician. He represented the electoral district of Trinity North in the Newfoundland and Labrador House of Assembly from 1991 to 2000. He was a member of the Liberal Party of Newfoundland and Labrador. Oldford was deputy speaker of the legislature in 2000, when he resigned for health reasons.

In 2001, he was named to the Historic Sites and Monuments Board of Canada.
