= Paul Dicks =

Canadian politician (born 1950)

The Honourable Paul D. Dicks ECNL KC

Speaker of the Newfoundland House of Assembly
- In office 1993–1995
- Preceded by: Thomas Lush
- Succeeded by: Lloyd Snow

MHA for Humber West
- In office 1989–2001
- Preceded by: Ray Baird
- Succeeded by: Danny Williams

Personal details
- Born: 1950 (age 75–76) Corner Brook, Newfoundland and Labrador
- Party: Newfoundland and Labrador Liberal Party

Paul D. Dicks (born 1950) is a lawyer and former politician in Newfoundland and Labrador. He represented Humber West in the Newfoundland and Labrador House of Assembly from 1989 to 2001 as a Liberal.

He was born in Corner Brook, Newfoundland and Labrador and was educated at Memorial University for undergraduate degrees in Arts and Education, and then at Dalhousie University in Halifax, Nova Scotia for his LL.B. Dicks was then called to the Newfoundland bar and set up practice in his hometown of Corner Brook.

He ran successfully for the Liberal Party in Humber West in the general election of 1989. He was Speaker of the House of Assembly of Newfoundland and Labrador from 1993 until 1995. Dicks served in the provincial cabinet as Minister of Justice and Attorney General from 1989 to 1991 and from 1998 to 1999, as Minister of Finance and President of Treasury Board from 1995 to 2000 and as Minister of Mines and Energy from 2000 to 2001. He left politics in 2001 after running unsuccessfully for leadership of the provincial Liberal Party. Dicks was named chair of Newfoundland and Labrador Hydro in 2003, serving until 2006, and was named to the board of directors for the Bank of Canada in 2002.

In 2007, Dicks promised to repay money spent on personal items, including fine wines and artwork using constituency allowance funds during his time as an MHA after he was criticized in a report by the provincial auditor general.
