= 47th General Assembly of Newfoundland and Labrador =

- Majority parliament
- October 27, 2011 – November 5, 2015

Parliament leaders
- Premier: Hon. Kathy Dunderdale; October 27, 2011 – January 24, 2014
- Hon. Tom Marshall; January 24, 2014 – September 26, 2014
- Hon. Paul Davis; September 26, 2014 – November 5, 2015
- Leader of the Opposition: Yvonne Jones; October 27, 2011 – January 3, 2012
- Dwight Ball; January 3, 2012 – July 18, 2013
- Eddie Joyce; July 18, 2013 – November 17, 2013
- Dwight Ball; November 17, 2013 – November 5, 2015

Party caucuses
- Government: Progressive Conservative Party
- Opposition: Liberal Party
- Recognized: New Democratic Party

House of Assembly
- Opposition House Leader: Yvonne Jones; January 3, 2012 – April 8, 2013
- Andrew Parsons; April 8, 2013 – November 5, 2015
- Members: 40 MHA seats

Sovereign
- Monarch: Elizabeth II; 6 February 1952 – present
← 46th	→ 48th

The 47th Newfoundland and Labrador House of Assembly was elected on October 11, 2011. Members of the House of Assembly were sworn in on October 27, 2011, and former cabinet minister Ross Wiseman was named Speaker of the House of Assembly the same day.

== Members ==
Name	Party	Riding	First elected / previously elected
Kevin Pollard	Progressive Conservative	Baie Verte-Springdale	2008
Eddie Joyce	Liberal	Bay of Islands	1989, 1999, 2011
Calvin Peach	Progressive Conservative	Bellevue	2007
Eli Cross	Progressive Conservative	Bonavista North	2011
Glen Little	Progressive Conservative	Bonavista South	2011
Andrew Parsons	Liberal	Burgeo and La Poile	2011
Clyde Jackman	Progressive Conservative	Burin-Placentia West	2003
Kevin Parsons	Progressive Conservative	Cape St. Francis	2008
Jerome Kennedy (until October 2, 2013)	Progressive Conservative	Carbonear-Harbour Grace	2007
Sam Slade	Liberal (since November 26, 2013)	Carbonear-Harbour Grace	2013
Yvonne Jones (until April 8, 2013)	Liberal	Cartwright-L'Anse au Clair	1996
Lisa Dempster	Liberal	Cartwright-L'Anse au Clair	2013
David Brazil	Progressive Conservative	Conception Bay East and Bell Island	2010
Terry French (until September 18, 2014)	Progressive Conservative	Conception Bay South	2002
Rex Hillier	Liberal (since November 21, 2014)	Conception Bay South	2014
Clayton Forsey	Progressive Conservative	Exploits	2005
Keith Hutchings	Progressive Conservative	Ferryland	2007
Tracey Perry	Progressive Conservative	Fortune Bay-Cape La Hune	2007
Kevin O'Brien	Progressive Conservative	Gander	2003
Darin King	Progressive Conservative	Grand Bank	2007
Susan Sullivan	Progressive Conservative	Grand Falls-Windsor-Buchans	2007
Ray Hunter	Progressive Conservative	Grand Falls-Windsor-Green Bay South	1999
Tom Hedderson	Progressive Conservative	Harbour Main	1999
Tom Marshall (until November 3, 2014)	Progressive Conservative	Humber East	2003
Stelman Flynn	Liberal (since December, 2014)	Humber East	2014
Dwight Ball	Liberal	Humber Valley	2007, 2011
Vaughn Granter	Progressive Conservative	Humber West	2011
John Dinn	Progressive Conservative	Kilbride	2007
Nick McGrath	Progressive Conservative	Labrador West	2011
Keith Russell	Progressive Conservative	Lake Melville	2011
Wade Verge	Progressive Conservative	Lewisporte	2007
Steve Kent	Progressive Conservative	Mount Pearl North	2007
Paul Lane	Progressive Conservative	Mount Pearl South	2011
Paul Lane	Liberal (since 2014)	Mount Pearl South	2011
Felix Collins	Progressive Conservative	Placentia and St. Mary's	2006
Tony Cornect	Progressive Conservative	Port au Port	2007
Glenn Littlejohn	Progressive Conservative	Port de Grave	2011
Lorraine Michael	NDP	Signal Hill-Quidi Vidi	2006
Jim Bennett	Liberal	St. Barbe	2011
Joan Shea (until June 2, 2014)	Progressive Conservative	St. George's-Stephenville East	2003
Scott Reid	Liberal (since September 11, 2014)	St. George's-Stephenville East	2014
Gerry Rogers	NDP	St. John's Centre	2011
George Murphy	NDP	St. John's East	2011
Dale Kirby	NDP	St. John's North	2011
Dale Kirby	Independent	St. John's North	2011
Dale Kirby	Liberal (since 2014)	St. John's North	2011
Tom Osborne	Progressive Conservative (until September 13, 2012)	St. John's South	1996
Tom Osborne	Independent (2012-2013)	St. John's South	1996
Tom Osborne	Liberal (since 2013)	St. John's South	1996
Dan Crummell	Progressive Conservative	St. John's West	2011
Sandy Collins	Progressive Conservative	Terra Nova	2006
Derrick Dalley	Progressive Conservative	The Isles of Notre Dame	2007
Christopher Mitchelmore	NDP	The Straits - White Bay North	2011
Christopher Mitchelmore	Independent	The Straits - White Bay North	2011
Christopher Mitchelmore	Liberal (since 2014)	The Straits - White Bay North	2011
Paul Davis	Progressive Conservative	Topsail	2010
Randy Edmunds	Liberal	Torngat Mountains	2011
Ross Wiseman	Progressive Conservative	Trinity North	2000 (Note: First Elected as a Liberal)
Charlene Johnson (until September 5, 2014)	Progressive Conservative	Trinity-Bay de Verde	2003
Steve Crocker	Liberal (since December, 2014)	Trinity-Bay de Verde	2014
Kathy Dunderdale (until February 28, 2014)	Progressive Conservative	Virginia Waters	2003
Cathy Bennett	Liberal (since April 9, 2014)	Virginia Waters	2014

== Seating plan ==
=== Standings changes in the 47th Assembly ===
Number of members per party by date	2011	2012	2013						2014										
Number of members per party by date	Oct 11	Sep 13	Apr 8	Jun 25	Aug 29	Oct 2	Oct 29	Nov 26	Jan 20	Feb 4	Feb 28	May 5	Jun 2	Sep 5	Sep 11	Sep 18	Nov 3	Nov 21	Dec
Progressive Conservative	37	36				35			34		33		32	31		30	29		
Liberal	6		5	6	7			8	9	11		12			13			14	16
NDP	5						3												
Independent	0	1			0		2			0									
Total members	48		47	48		47		48			47	48	47	46	47	46	45	46	48
Vacant	0		1	0		1		0			1	0	1	2	1	2	3	2	0
Government Majority	26	24	25	24		23		22	20		19	18	17	16	15	14	13	12	10

Membership changes in the 47th Assembly
Date	Name	District	Party	Reason
October 11, 2011	See List of Members			Election day of the 2011 Newfoundland and Labrador general election
September 13, 2012	Tom Osborne	St. John's South	Independent	Voluntarily left the Progressive Conservative caucus
April 8, 2013	Yvonne Jones	Cartwright-L'Anse au Clair	Liberal	Resigned to run in a federal by-election in Labrador
June 25, 2013	Lisa Dempster	Cartwright-L'Anse au Clair	Liberal	Elected by-election
August 29, 2013	Tom Osborne	St. John's South	Liberal	Joined the Liberal caucus
October 2, 2013	Jerome Kennedy	Carbonear-Harbour Grace	Progressive Conservative	Resigned
October 29, 2013	Dale Kirby	St. John's North	Independent	Left the NDP caucus at odds with the leadership of Lorraine Michael
October 29, 2013	Christopher Mitchelmore	The Straits - White Bay North	Independent	Left the NDP caucus at odds with the leadership of Lorraine Michael
November 26, 2013	Sam Slade	Carbonear-Harbour Grace	Liberal	Elected in a by-election
January 20, 2014	Paul Lane	Mount Pearl South	Liberal	Joined the Liberal caucus
February 4, 2014	Dale Kirby	St. John's North	Liberal	Joined the Liberal caucus
February 4, 2014	Christopher Mitchelmore	The Straits – White Bay North	Liberal	Joined the Liberal caucus
February 28, 2014	Kathy Dunderdale	Virginia Waters	Progressive Conservative	Resigned
April 9, 2014	Cathy Bennett	Virginia Waters	Liberal	Elected in a by-election, sworn in on May 5, 2014.
June 2, 2014	Joan Shea	St. George's-Stephenville East	Progressive Conservative	Resigned
August 26, 2014	Scott Reid	St. George's-Stephenville East	Liberal	Elected in a by-election, sworn in on September 11, 2014
September 5, 2014	Charlene Johnson	Trinity-Bay de Verde	Progressive Conservative	Resigned
September 18, 2014	Terry French	Conception Bay South	Progressive Conservative	Resigned
November 3, 2014	Tom Marshall	Humber East	Progressive Conservative	Resigned
November 5, 2014	Rex Hillier	Conception Bay South	Liberal	Elected in a by-election, sworn in on November 21, 2014
November 25, 2014	Steve Crocker	Trinity-Bay de Verde	Liberal	Elected in a by-election, sworn in December, 2014
November 25, 2014	Stelman Flynn	Humber East	Liberal	Elected in a by-election, sworn in December, 2014
