= 2015 Newfoundland and Labrador general election =

Canadian provincial election

- November 30, 2015

All 40 seats in the 48th General Assembly of Newfoundland and Labrador 21 seats needed for a majority
- Opinion polls
- Turnout: 55.2% (▼2.7 pp)
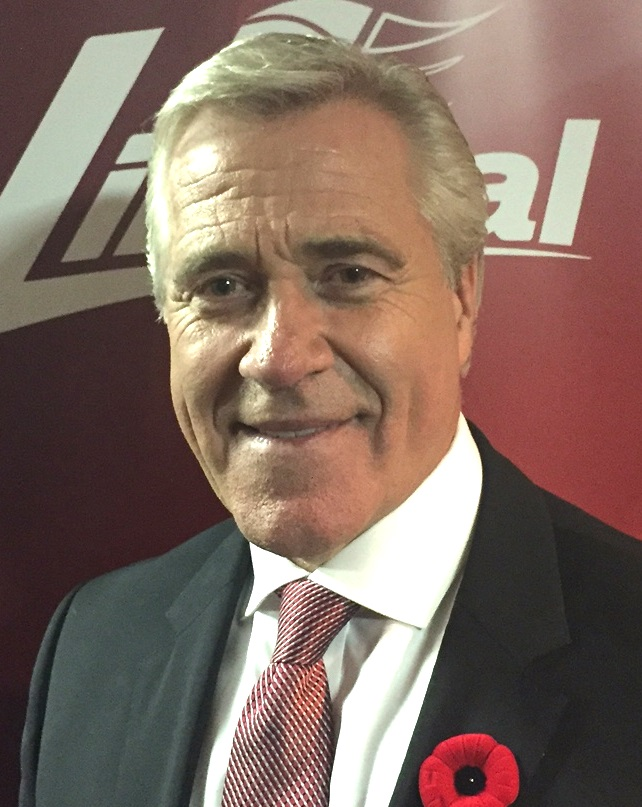

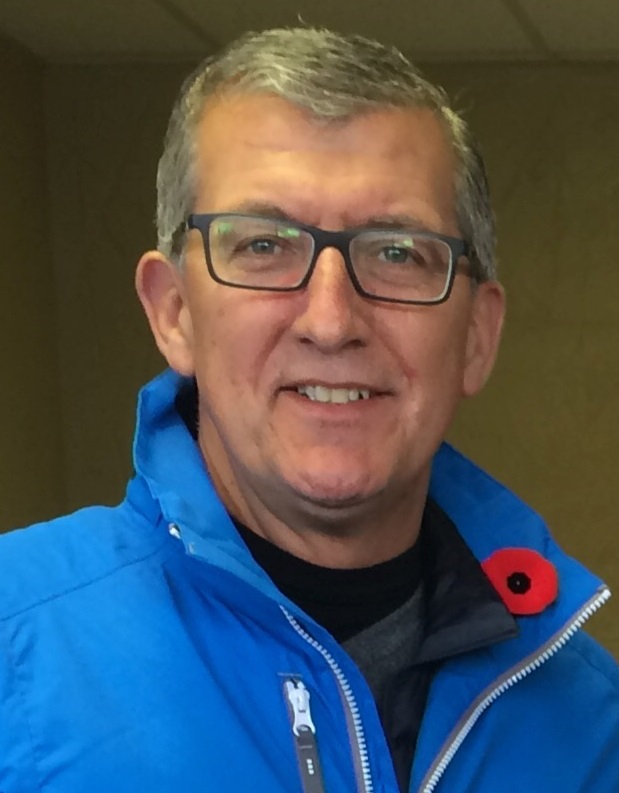
	First party	Second party	Third party
			NDP
Leader	Dwight Ball	Paul Davis	Earle McCurdy
Party	Liberal	Progressive Conservative	New Democratic
Leader since	November 17, 2013	September 13, 2014	March 7, 2015
Leader's seat	Humber - Gros Morne	Topsail-Paradise	ran in St. John's West (lost)
Last election	6 seats, 19.1%	37 seats, 56.1%	5 seats, 24.6%
Seats before	16	29	3
Seats won	31	7	2
Seat change	▲15	▼22	▼1
Popular vote	114,271	60,413	23,906
Percentage	57.2%	30.1%	12.0%
Swing	▲38.1pp	▼25.9pp	▼12.6pp
- Popular vote by riding. As this is an FPTP election, seat totals are not determined by popular vote, but instead via results by each riding.
Premier before election
Paul Davis
Progressive Conservative
Premier after election
Dwight Ball
Liberal

The 2015 Newfoundland and Labrador general election, held on November 30, 2015, elected members of the 48th General Assembly of Newfoundland and Labrador. The Progressive Conservative Party which had governed since 2003 election, was defeated by the Liberal Party, which won a majority in the new assembly.

The election had been scheduled for October 13, 2015, under Newfoundland and Labrador's House of Assembly Act, mandating a fixed election day on the second Tuesday in October in the fourth calendar year after the previous election. However, the House of Assembly amended the act in June 2015, to delay the election until November 30, 2015, so that the election campaign would not overlap with the federal election scheduled on October 19, 2015.

Following the result of the election no party with the word "Conservative" in its name formed the government in either a provincial or federal jurisdiction in Canada for the first time since 1943.

At the time (with 55.2% of eligible voters casting a ballot), this election had the lowest turnout of any provincial election since confederation. This record was broken in 2021 when only 48.24% of eligible voters cast a ballot.

== Party leadership ==
Following the 2011 provincial election Liberal leader Kevin Aylward announced his resignation as leader. Aylward was unable to win a seat in the legislature and announced on October 26, 2011, he would step down once his successor was chosen. On December 15, 2011, the Liberal Party announced that Dwight Ball would become Leader of the Opposition and interim Liberal leader effective January 3, 2012. Party president Judy Morrow announced in December 2011, that the party was not likely to hold a leadership convention until sometime in 2013. On November 17, 2013, Dwight Ball was elected leader of the Liberal Party.

On January 22, 2014, Kathy Dunderdale announced she was resigning as Premier of Newfoundland and Labrador and leader of the Progressive Conservative Party (PC Party) later that week and that Finance Minister Tom Marshall would replace her until the party selected a new leader. On January 24, 2014, Marshall was sworn in as the province's 11th premier. Marshall had indicated that he would not be seeking re-election as the member of the House of Assembly for Humber East and therefore would not contest the leadership of the Progressive Conservative Party. The party held its leadership convention on September 13, 2014, and chose Paul Davis as its leader. Davis was sworn in as the 12th Premier on September 26, 2014.

== Timeline ==
2011

- October 11, 2011: Election held for members of the Newfoundland and Labrador House of Assembly in the 47th General Assembly of Newfoundland and Labrador.
- October 26, 2011: Liberal Leader Kevin Aylward announces his resignation after failing to win the district of St. George's-Stephenville East in the election.
- December 15, 2011: The Liberal Party announces that Humber Valley MHA Dwight Ball will become Leader of the Opposition and interim Liberal leader effective January 3, 2012.

2012

- January 3, 2012: Dwight Ball becomes interim leader of the Liberal Party of Newfoundland and Labrador.
- September 13, 2012: Progressive Conservative MHA Tom Osborne announces that he has left the party and will sit as an independent.

2013

- April 8, 2013: Yvonne Jones (Liberal) resigns her Cartwright-L'Anse au Clair seat to run in a federal by-election in Labrador.
- June 25, 2013: Lisa Dempster (Liberal) is elected MHA for Cartwright-L'Anse au Clair, following the resignation of Yvonne Jones.
- July 18, 2013: Bay of Islands MHA Eddie Joyce is named Leader of the Opposition and Interim Liberal Leader replacing Dwight Ball who resigned to run for the leadership permanently in the party's 2013 leadership election.
- August 29, 2013: Independent MHA Tom Osborne (former PC) joins the Liberal caucus.
- October 2, 2013: Jerome Kennedy (PC) resigns his Carbonear-Harbour Grace seat.
- October 21, 2013: The media reports that NDP Leader Lorraine Michael received a letter signed by all four members of her caucus over the previous weekend calling for a leadership election to be held in 2014. Michael subsequently asks the party to hold a leadership review in 2014 in which her leadership would be voted on, but not a full party convention.
- October 29, 2013: NDP MHAs Dale Kirby and Christopher Mitchelmore announce that they have left the NDP caucus and will sit as independents.
- November 17, 2013: Dwight Ball is elected as leader of the Liberal Party.
- November 26, 2013: Liberal Sam Slade is elected MHA for Carbonear-Harbour Grace.

2014

- January 20, 2014: PC MHA Paul Lane for Mount Pearl South crosses the floor to the Liberal Party.
- January 24, 2014: Kathy Dunderdale resigns as Premier. Finance Minister Tom Marshall is sworn in as premier until Dunderdale's successor is chosen.
- January 27, 2014: Dale Kirby and Christopher Mitchelmore resign their NDP memberships and are now full Independents.
- February 4, 2014: Dale Kirby and Christopher Mitchelmore cross the floor to the Liberal Party.
- February 28, 2014: Kathy Dunderdale resigns her Virginia Waters seat.
- April 9, 2014: Cathy Bennett (Liberal) is elected MHA for Virginia Waters.
- April 17, 2014: Frank Coleman becomes leader-designate of the Progressive Conservative Party following the withdrawal of sole competitor Bill Barry from the leadership election.
- May 18, 2014: Following a party crisis in October 2013, Lorraine Michael is endorsed by 75% of NDP members during a leadership review.
- June 2, 2014: Joan Shea (PC) resigns her St. George's-Stephenville East seat.
- June 16, 2014: Citing a "significant and challenging family matter," Frank Coleman announces his withdrawal from the Progressive Conservative leadership race. As the only candidate left in the race, Coleman was to officially become Progressive Conservative leader at the party's convention on July 5, 2014. Following his withdrawal, Premier Tom Marshall announced that a convention would likely be postponed until after Labour Day.
- August 26, 2014: Scott Reid (Liberal) is elected MHA for St. George's-Stephenville East.
- September 5, 2014: Charlene Johnson (PC) resigns her Trinity-Bay de Verde seat.
- September 13, 2014: Paul Davis is elected leader of the Progressive Conservatives.
- September 18, 2014: Terry French (PC) resigns his Conception Bay South seat.
- September 26, 2014: Paul Davis is sworn in as premier.
- November 3, 2014: Tom Marshall (PC) resigns his Humber East seat.
- November 5, 2014: Rex Hillier (Liberal) is elected MHA for Conception Bay South.
- November 25, 2014: Steve Crocker (Liberal) and Stelman Flynn (Liberal) are elected as MHAs for Trinity-Bay de Verde and Humber East respectively.

2015

- January 6, 2015: Lorraine Michael announces she will resign as NDP leader.
- March 7, 2015: Earle McCurdy is elected leader of the NDP.
- July 3, 2015: Kevin O'Brien (PC) resigns his Gander seat.

== Campaign ==
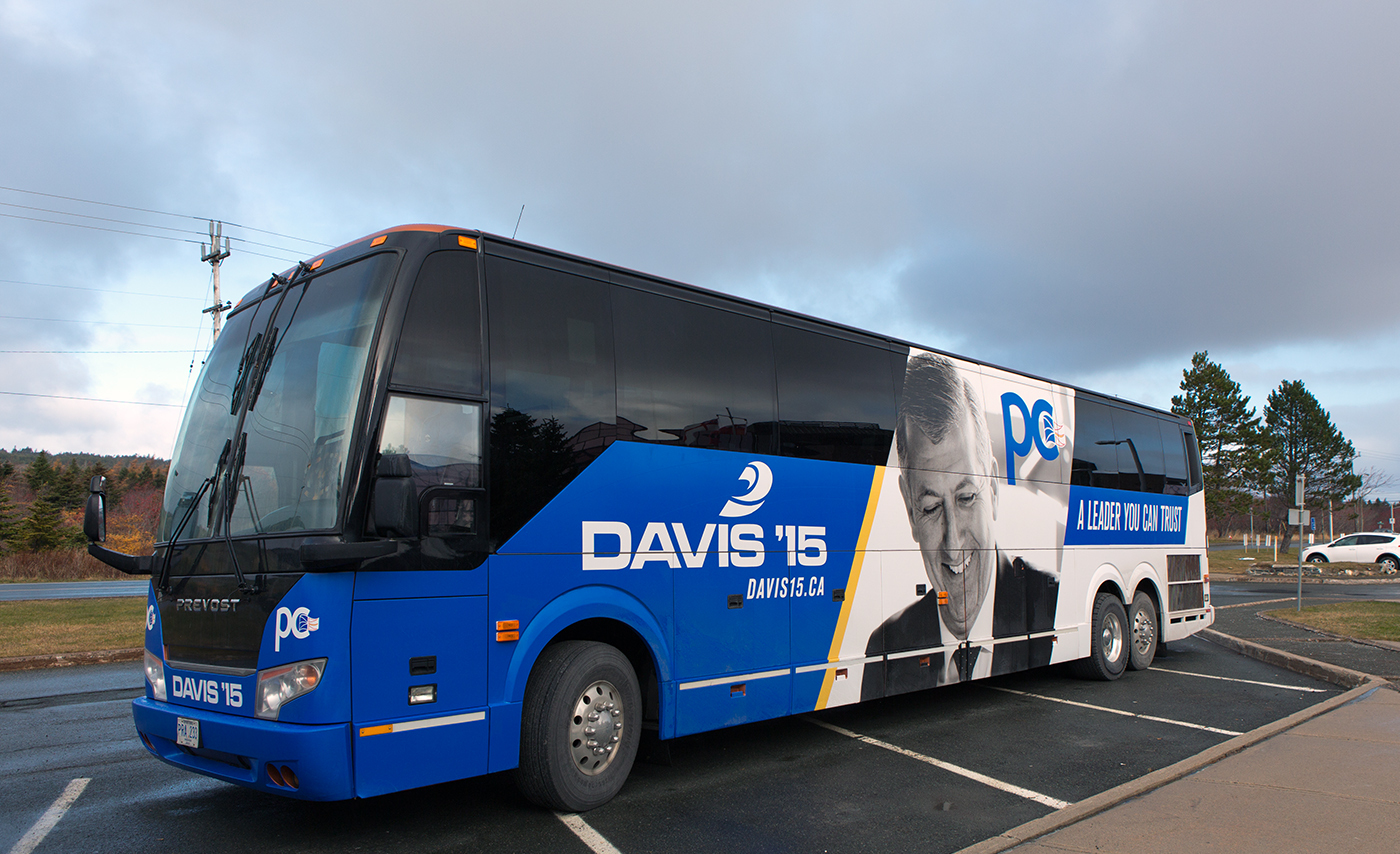
Davis PC Campaign Bus

In June 2015, Premier Davis announced that a general election would be held in November, after the October federal election. Many veteran PC MHAs who had served in Danny Williams' cabinet did not seek re-election. On November 5, Davis visited the lieutenant governor to request that the House of Assembly be dissolved. The election would be held on November 30.

The Liberals consistently held a massive lead in public opinion polling throughout the campaign, with 66% support among decided voters at the outset and 67% support in a poll released just one week before election day.

Their lead was so large and so unshakable that some pundits openly speculated that the party could potentially sweep every seat in the province, although others suggested that this was unlikely. Numerous ridings in and around St. John's remained more competitive than provincewide polling suggested, and some voters appeared to be swayed in the final days by the argument that even if they were inclined to support the Liberals, the province's democratic process would not be well-served by giving one party a clean sweep of the legislature with no opposition party to challenge them.

In the final results, the Liberals did win almost every seat in most of the province, except for a single Progressive Conservative incumbent hanging on in Central Newfoundland; in St. John's, however, the New Democrats successfully retained two of the three seats they held in the city, while the Progressive Conservatives held onto almost every seat in the city's suburbs.

The largest victory in the province was won by Liberal MLA Andrew Parsons in Burgeo-La Poile, who took 96.5% of the more than 4,000 votes cast in his riding while neither of his opponents garnered even 100 votes.

== Party standings ==
This election saw the fourth change-in-government since Newfoundland and Labrador joined confederation in 1949.

Summary of the House of Assembly of Newfoundland and Labrador election results
Party	Votes	%	+/–	Seats			
Party	Votes	%	+/–	2011	Dissol.	2015	Change
Liberal	114,271	57.15	+38.1	6	16	31	+15
Progressive Conservative	60,413	30.22	-25.9	37	29	7	-22
New Democratic	23,906	11.96	-12.6	5	3	2	-1
Independents	1,344	0.67	+0.5	±0	±0	0	±0
Total	199,934	100.00	–	48	48	40	0

=== Results by party ===
↓
31	7	2
Liberal	Progressive Conservative	NDP

==== Liberal Party ====
The Liberal Party won 31 seats making this election their best election since 1999 when the party won 32. However, in 1990, the party won 32 of 48 seats (66.7%), while they won 31 of 40 seats (77.5%) in 2015. By percentage, this is the party's best result since 1966 when the party won 39 of 42 seats (92.9%). Dwight Ball is the province's first liberal premier since Roger Grimes. 6 liberal candidates won over 80% of the popular vote in their respective ridings and four of these six candidates were later appointed to the Executive Council.

==== Progressive Conservative Party ====
With this election, PC leader Paul Davis became the fourth incumbent premier to not lead his party to re-election (after Joey Smallwood in 1972, Tom Rideout in 1989 and Roger Grimes in 2003). With seven of 40 seats (17.5%), this is the party's worst result since 1966 when it won three of 42 seats.

==== New Democratic Party ====
In the 2011 election, the NDP placed second in total votes. They won five seats (a record-high for the party); however, since the election, two NDP MHAs defected to the Liberal Party. Only two of the three remaining NDP MHAs ran for re-election; these two MHAs were the only NDP candidates to win in this election. By percentage of seats however, this is the second-best result the provincial NDP has ever had winning two of 40 seats (5%). However, NDP leader McCurdy was defeated in his district.

=== Results by region ===
The district with the highest turnout was Cape St. Francis (71.68%). The district with the lowest turnout was Torngat Mountains (39.50%).

Party Name		St. John's	St. John's Metro	Avalon/Burin	Central	Western	Labrador	Total
Parties winning seats in the legislature:
Progressive Conservative	Seats:	0	5	1	1	0	0	7
Progressive Conservative	Popular Vote:	19.81%	54.74%	29.71%	34.51%	13.50%	18.90%	30.22%
Liberal	Seats:	5	1	6	8	7	4	31
Liberal	Popular Vote:	50.27%	36.97%	61.80%	55.76%	79.19%	63.41%	57.15%
New Democratic	Seats:	2	0	0	0	0	0	2
New Democratic	Popular Vote:	29.92%	8.29%	8.19%	7.17%	7.31%	17.69%	11.96%
Parties that won no seats in the legislature
Independent	Popular Vote:			0.30%	2.56%			0.67%

== Candidates by district ==
Bold incumbents indicate cabinet members and party leaders are italicized. The premier's name is boldfaced and italicized.

- All candidate names are those on the official list of confirmed candidates; names in media or on party website may differ slightly.
- Names in **boldface type** represent party leaders.
- † Represents that the incumbent is not running again.
- § represents that the incumbent was defeated for nomination.
- ₰ represents that the incumbent ran in another district and lost the nomination.
- ‡ Represents that the incumbent is running in a different district.

=== St. John's ===
Electoral district	Candidates				Incumbent
Electoral district	PC	Liberal	NDP	Other	Incumbent
Mount Scio; 46.81% turnout	Rhonda Churchill Herder; 1,104; 27.4%	Dale Kirby; 1,899; 47.1%	Sean Panting; 1,030; 25.5%		Dale Kirby; St. John's North
St. John's Centre; 47.58% turnout	Kathie Hicks; 490; 10.6%	Lynn Sullivan; 1,923; 41.7%	Gerry Rogers; 2,195; 47.6%		Gerry Rogers
St. John's East-Quidi Vidi; 56.40% turnout	Joshua Collier; 478; 8.1%	Paul Antle; 2,365; 40.2%	Lorraine Michael; 3,035; 51.6%		George Murphy†; St. John's East
St. John's West; 55.63% turnout	Dan Crummell; 1,364; 26.8%	Siobhan Coady; 2,342; 46.0%	**Earle McCurdy**; 1,384; 27.2%		Dan Crummell
Virginia Waters-Pleasantville; 56.55% turnout	Beth Crosbie; 1,826; 32.5%	Bernard Davis; 2,528; 45.0%	Bob Buckingham; 1,259; 22.4		Lorraine Michael‡ Signal Hill-Quidi Vidi
Waterford Valley; 55.13% turnout	Alison Stoodley; 792; 14.6%	Tom Osborne; 3,588; 65.9%	Alison Coffin; 1,062; 19.5%		John Dinn; Kilbride
Waterford Valley; 55.13% turnout	Alison Stoodley; 792; 14.6%	Tom Osborne; 3,588; 65.9%	Alison Coffin; 1,062; 19.5%		Merged District
Waterford Valley; 55.13% turnout	Alison Stoodley; 792; 14.6%	Tom Osborne; 3,588; 65.9%	Alison Coffin; 1,062; 19.5%		Tom Osborne; St. John's South
Windsor Lake; 52.59% turnout	Ryan Cleary; 970; 20.2%	Cathy Bennett; 3,182; 66.3%	Don Rowe; 647; 13.5%		Cathy Bennett; Virginia Waters

=== St. John's suburbs ===
Electoral district	Candidates				Incumbent
Electoral district	PC	Liberal	NDP	Other	Incumbent
Cape St. Francis; 71.68% turnout	Kevin Parsons; 4,086; 66.3%	Geoff Gallant; 1,613; 26.2%	Mark Gruchy; 460; 7.5%		Kevin Parsons
Conception Bay South; 55.03% turnout	Barry Petten; 2,360; 47.7%	Steve Porter; 2,187; 44.2%	Jeanne Clarke; 398; 8.0%		Rex Hillier‡
Mount Pearl North; 63.09% turnout	Steve Kent; 3,120; 51.5%	Randy Simms; 2,571; 42.4%	Cameron Mercer-Maillet; 370; 6.1%		**Steve Kent**
Mount Pearl-Southlands; 56.58% turnout	Jim Lester; 2,318; 42.9%	Paul Lane; 2,559; 47.4%	Roy Locke; 522; 9.7%		Paul Lane; Mount Pearl South
Conception Bay East – Bell Island; 55.46% turnout	David Brazil; 3,463; 59.2%	Danny Dumaresque; 1,582; 27.1%	Bill Kavanagh; 803; 13.7%		**David Brazil**
Topsail-Paradise; 57.58% turnout	**Paul Davis**; 3,381; 58.3%	Rex Hillier; 2,137; 36.9%	Chris Bruce; 281; 4.8%		**Paul Davis**; Topsail

=== Avalon Peninsula ===
Electoral district	Candidates				Incumbent
Electoral district	PC	Liberal	NDP	Other	Incumbent
Carbonear-Trinity-Bay de Verde; 49.02% turnout	Tomas Shea; 529; 9.1%	Steve Crocker; 4,952; 85.0%	David Coish; 304; 5.2%	Ed Cole (Ind.); 38; 0.7%	Steve Crocker; Trinity-Bay de Verde
Carbonear-Trinity-Bay de Verde; 49.02% turnout	Tomas Shea; 529; 9.1%	Steve Crocker; 4,952; 85.0%	David Coish; 304; 5.2%	Ed Cole (Ind.); 38; 0.7%	Merged District
Carbonear-Trinity-Bay de Verde; 49.02% turnout	Tomas Shea; 529; 9.1%	Steve Crocker; 4,952; 85.0%	David Coish; 304; 5.2%	Ed Cole (Ind.); 38; 0.7%	Sam Slade§ Carbonear-Harbour Grace
Ferryland; 62.34% turnout	Keith Hutchings; 3,093; 49.8%	Jeff Marshall; 2,550; 41.1%	Mona Rossiter; 564; 9.1%		Keith Hutchings
Harbour Grace-Port de Grave; 59.50% turnout	Glenn Littlejohn; 2,289; 36.3%	Pam Parsons; 3,877; 61.5%	Kathleen Burt; 133; 2.1%		Glenn Littlejohn; Port de Grave
Harbour Main; 56.31% turnout	Curtis Buckle; 1,998; 34.9%	Betty Parsley; 2,253; 39.4%	Raymond Flaherty; 1,381; 24.2%	Ted Noseworthy; 85; 1.5%	Tom Hedderson†
Placentia-St. Mary's; 61.71% turnout	Judy Manning; 1,751; 30.5%	Sherry Gambin-Walsh; 3,789; 66.0%	Peter Beck; 197; 3.4%		Felix Collins†

=== Eastern Newfoundland ===
Electoral district	Candidates				Incumbent
Electoral district	PC	Liberal	NDP	Other	Incumbent
Bonavista; 57.80% turnout	Glen Little; 1,436; 27.0%	Neil King; 3,504; 65.8%	Adrian Power; 116; 2.2%	Johanna Ryan Guy (Ind.); 269; 5.1%	Glen Little; Bonavista South
Burin-Grand Bank; 53.60% turnout	Terence Fleming; 441; 8.8%	Carol Anne Haley; 3,962; 79.4%	Ambrose Penton; 590; 11.8%		Darin King†; Grand Bank
Placentia West-Bellevue; 59.10% turnout	Calvin Peach; 1,931; 33.7%	Mark Browne; 3,645; 63.7%	Bobbie Warren; 146; 2.6%		Calvin Peach; Bellevue
Placentia West-Bellevue; 59.10% turnout	Calvin Peach; 1,931; 33.7%	Mark Browne; 3,645; 63.7%	Bobbie Warren; 146; 2.6%		Merged District
Placentia West-Bellevue; 59.10% turnout	Calvin Peach; 1,931; 33.7%	Mark Browne; 3,645; 63.7%	Bobbie Warren; 146; 2.6%		Clyde Jackman†; Burin-Placentia West
Terra Nova; 57.29% turnout	Sandy Collins; 2,422; 42.8%	Colin Holloway; 2,476; 43.7%	Bert Blundon; 763; 13.5		Sandy Collins; Terra Nova
Terra Nova; 57.29% turnout	Sandy Collins; 2,422; 42.8%	Colin Holloway; 2,476; 43.7%	Bert Blundon; 763; 13.5		Merged District
Terra Nova; 57.29% turnout	Sandy Collins; 2,422; 42.8%	Colin Holloway; 2,476; 43.7%	Bert Blundon; 763; 13.5		Ross Wiseman†; Trinity North

=== Central Newfoundland ===
Electoral district	Candidates				Incumbent
Electoral district	PC	Liberal	NDP	Other	Incumbent
Baie Verte-Green Bay; 55.90% turnout	Kevin Pollard; 2,197; 39.4%	Brian Warr; 3,130; 56.1%	Matt Howse; 253; 4.5%		Kevin Pollard; Baie Verte-Springdale
Exploits; 56.16% turnout	Clayton Forsey; 2,489; 47.0%	Jerry Dean; 2,654; 50.2%	Bridget Henley; 148; 2.8%		Clayton Forsey
Fogo Island-Cape Freels; 48.20% turnout	Eli Cross; 1,387; 27.6%	Derrick Bragg; 3,516; 69.9%	Rebecca Stuckey; 128; 2.5%		Eli Cross; Bonavista North
Gander; 47.40% turnout	Ryan Menchion; 351; 7.5%	John Haggie; 3,151; 67.7%	Lukas Norman; 1,152; 24.8%		Vacant
Fortune Bay-Cape La Hune; 67.66% turnout	Tracey Perry; 1,830; 49.1%	Bill Carter; 1,405; 37.7%	Mildred Skinner; 494; 13.2%		Tracey Perry
Grand Falls-Windsor-Buchans; 54.32% turnout	Mark Whiffen; 1,061; 22.8%	Al Hawkins; 2,534; 54.6%	Meaghan Keating; 141; 3.0%	Rex Barnes (Ind.); 908; 19.6%	Susan Sullivan†; Grand Falls-Windsor-Buchans
Grand Falls-Windsor-Buchans; 54.32% turnout	Mark Whiffen; 1,061; 22.8%	Al Hawkins; 2,534; 54.6%	Meaghan Keating; 141; 3.0%	Rex Barnes (Ind.); 908; 19.6%	Merged District
Grand Falls-Windsor-Buchans; 54.32% turnout	Mark Whiffen; 1,061; 22.8%	Al Hawkins; 2,534; 54.6%	Meaghan Keating; 141; 3.0%	Rex Barnes (Ind.); 908; 19.6%	Ray Hunter†; Grand Falls-Windsor-Green Bay South
Lewisporte-Twillingate; 58.44% turnout	Derrick Dalley; 2,686; 44.5%	Derek Bennett; 3,254; 53.9%	Hillary Bushell; 99; 1.6%		Wade Verge†; Lewisporte
Lewisporte-Twillingate; 58.44% turnout	Derrick Dalley; 2,686; 44.5%	Derek Bennett; 3,254; 53.9%	Hillary Bushell; 99; 1.6%		Merged District
Lewisporte-Twillingate; 58.44% turnout	Derrick Dalley; 2,686; 44.5%	Derek Bennett; 3,254; 53.9%	Hillary Bushell; 99; 1.6%		Derrick Dalley; The Isles of Notre Dame

=== Western Newfoundland ===
Electoral district	Candidates				Incumbent
Electoral district	PC	Liberal	NDP	Other	Incumbent
Burgeo-La Poile; 57.73% turnout	Georgia Darmonkow; 93; 2.2%	Andrew Parsons; 3,998; 96.5%	Kelly McKeown; 53; 1.3%		Andrew Parsons
Corner Brook; 45.03% turnout	Neville Wheaton; 779; 16.6%	Gerry Byrne; 3,121; 66.7%	Holly Pike; 781; 16.7%		Vaughn Granter; Humber West
Corner Brook; 45.03% turnout	Neville Wheaton; 779; 16.6%	Gerry Byrne; 3,121; 66.7%	Holly Pike; 781; 16.7%		Merged District
Corner Brook; 45.03% turnout	Neville Wheaton; 779; 16.6%	Gerry Byrne; 3,121; 66.7%	Holly Pike; 781; 16.7%		Stelman Flynn§ Humber East
Humber - Gros Morne; 64.85% turnout	Graydon Pelley; 983; 16.2%	**Dwight Ball**; 4,610; 76.0%	Mike Goosney; 474; 7.8%		Jim Bennett₰ St. Barbe
Humber - Gros Morne; 64.85% turnout	Graydon Pelley; 983; 16.2%	**Dwight Ball**; 4,610; 76.0%	Mike Goosney; 474; 7.8%		Merged District
Humber - Gros Morne; 64.85% turnout	Graydon Pelley; 983; 16.2%	**Dwight Ball**; 4,610; 76.0%	Mike Goosney; 474; 7.8%		Dwight Ball; Humber Valley
Humber-Bay of Islands; 52.56% turnout	Ronald Jesseau; 564; 10.3%	Eddie Joyce; 4,622; 84.5%	Conor Curtis; 282; 5.2%		Eddie Joyce; Bay of Islands
St. Barbe-L'Anse aux Meadows; 52.65% turnout	Ford Mitchelmore; 404; 8.3%	Chris Mitchelmore; 4,359; 89.3%	Genevieve Brouillette; 117; 2.4%		Chris Mitchelmore; The Straits-White Bay North
St. George's-Humber; 49.68% turnout	Greg Osmond; 708; 15.2%	Scott Reid; 3,618; 77.5%	Shane Snook; 341; 7.3%		Scott Reid; St. George's-Stephenville East
Stephenville-Port au Port; 51.24% turnout	Tony Cornect; 1,273; 25.3%	John Finn; 3,262; 64.8%	Bernice Hancock; 499; 9.9%		Tony Cornect; Port au Port

=== Labrador ===
Electoral district	Candidates				Incumbent
Electoral district	PC	Liberal	NDP	Other	Incumbent
Cartwright-L'Anse au Clair; 49.30% turnout	Jason MacKenzie; 48; 3.2%	Lisa Dempster; 1,405; 93.0%	Jennifer Deon; 57; 3.8%		Lisa Dempster
Labrador West; 53.60% turnout	Nick McGrath; 712; 21.5%	Graham Letto; 1,453; 43.8%	Ron Barron; 1,152; 34.7%		Nick McGrath
Lake Melville; 47.97% turnout	Keith Russell; 850; 28.6%	Perry Trimper; 1,840; 62.0%	Arlene Michelin-Pittman; 280; 9.4%		Keith Russell
Torngat Mountains; 39.50% turnout	Sharon Vokey; 23; 2.7%	Randy Edmunds; 779; 92.6%	Mark Sharkey; 39; 4.6%		Randy Edmunds

Preliminary results as of 1 December 2015.

== MHAs not running again ==
Progressive Conservative

- Felix Collins, Placentia—St. Mary's
- John Dinn, Kilbride
- Vaughn Granter, Humber West
- Tom Hedderson, Harbour Main
- Ray Hunter, Grand Falls-Windsor-Green Bay South
- Clyde Jackman, Burin-Placentia West
- Darin King, Grand Bank
- Susan Sullivan, Grand Falls-Windsor-Buchans
- Wade Verge, Lewisporte
- Ross Wiseman, Trinity North

Liberal

- Jim Bennett, St. Barbe
- Stelman Flynn, Humber East
- Sam Slade, Carbonear-Harbour Grace

New Democratic Party

- George Murphy, St. John's East

== Opinion polls ==
Polling Firm	Date of Polling	Link	Progressive Conservative	Liberal	New Democratic
Forum Research	November 29, 2015		31	54	15
Abacus Data	November 22–24, 2015		22	64	13
Forum Research	November 24, 2015		29	52	19
Corporate Research Associates	November 5–22, 2015		22	67	10
MQO	November 5–11, 2015		17	74	9
Forum Research	November 6, 2015		21	65	13
Abacus Data	October 30–November 4, 2015		19	66	15
Corporate Research Associates	August 11–September 2, 2015		27	48	25
Abacus Data/VOCM	June 17–21, 2015		21	53	25
Corporate Research Associates	May 11–June 1, 2015		27	50	22
Corporate Research Associates	February 9–March 2, 2015		31	56	13
Abacus Data	February 17–25, 2015		32	57	9
Corporate Research Associates	November 5–30, 2014		29	60	10
MQO	October 20–25, 2014		28	62	11
Corporate Research Associates	August 7–September 1, 2014		26	58	15
Abacus Data/VOCM	July 28–August 1, 2014		34	48	16
Corporate Research Associates	May 12–31, 2014		29	53	16
Corporate Research Associates	February 11– March 4, 2014		33	53	13
Abacus Data/VOCM	January 27–30, 2014		34	49	15
Corporate Research Associates	November 7–30, 2013		29	52	19
MQO	October 22–26, 2013		29	52	18
Corporate Research Associates	August 8–31, 2013		26	41	33
Corporate Research Associates	May 8–30, 2013		27	36	37
Corporate Research Associates	February 11–March 8, 2013	PDF	38	22	39
MQO	January 21–27, 2013		36	28	35
Corporate Research Associates	November 13-December 1, 2012		46	23	31
Corporate Research Associates	August 9–September 2, 2012	PDF	45	22	33
Environics Research Group	June 19–29, 2012	PDF	35	26	38
Corporate Research Associates	May 10–June 4, 2012	PDF	49	18	33
Corporate Research Associates	February 13–29, 2012	HTML	54	18	28
Corporate Research Associates	November 9–29, 2011	PDF	60	13	26
Election 2011	October 11, 2011	–	56.1	19.1	24.6
