= John Butt (politician) =

Canadian politician

The Honourable John Butt ECNL

MHA for Conception Bay South
- In office 1979–1989
- Preceded by: John A. Nolan
- Succeeded by: Pat Cowan

Minister of Culture, Recreation, and Youth
- In office January 9, 1988 – March 27, 1989
- Preceded by: Bill Matthews
- Succeeded by: Office Abolished

Minister of Environment And Lands
- In office March 27, 1989 – May 5, 1989
- Preceded by: James Russell
- Succeeded by: Jim Kelland

Personal details
- Born: September 24, 1941 (age 85)

John C. Butt (born September 24, 1941) is a former politician in Newfoundland. He represented Conception Bay South in the Newfoundland House of Assembly from 1979 to 1989.

Butt was born in Pouch Cove. He served on the town council for Conception Bay South. He was elected to the Newfoundland assembly in 1979 and served in the provincial cabinet as Minister of Environment and Lands and as Minister of Culture, Recreation and Youth. Butt was defeated by Pat Cowan when he ran for reelection in 1989.
