= Deputy Premier of Newfoundland and Labrador =

Deputy head of government in the Newfoundland and Labrador province of Canada

- Coat of arms of Newfoundland and Labrador

- Flag of Newfoundland and Labrador
- Incumbent; Barry Petten since 29 October 2025
- Office of the Premier
- Style: The Honourable (formal); Deputy Premier (informal)
- Status: Deputy Head of Government
- Member of: House Assembly; Executive Council
- Reports to: House Assembly; Premier
- Seat: Confederation Building, East Block, St. John's
- Nominator: Premier of Newfoundland and Labrador
- Appointer: Lieutenant Governor of Newfoundland and Labrador
- Term length: At His Majesty's pleasure
- Formation: January 9, 1988
- First holder: John F. Collins
- Website: Office of the Premier

The Deputy Premier of Newfoundland and Labrador is the representative of the Premier in the Canadian province of Newfoundland and Labrador.

The deputy premier is appointed by the lieutenant governor of Newfoundland and Labrador, as representative of the King in Right of Newfoundland and Labrador. The deputy premier is nominated by the Premier, who usually is the leader of the party that commands a majority in the House of Assembly. It is typical that the deputy premier holds additional portfolios and is a member of the Cabinet.

The word premier is derived from the French word of the same spelling, meaning "first"; and ultimately from the Latin word primarius, meaning "primary"; and hence deputy means "secondary".

Barry Petten has served as the Deputy Premier since October 29, 2025. He represents Conception Bay South in the House of Assembly and holds additional portfolios as Minister of Transportation and Infrastructure and Minister of Public Procurement.

The office was established in 1988. Before 2001, the official title was Deputy Premier of Newfoundland.

== List of deputy premiers ==
No.	Officeholder	Term start	Term end	Time in office	Party	Ministry	Constituency	Notes
1	John F. Collins	9 January 1988	27 March 1989	1 year, 77 days	PC	Peckford	St. John's South	
2	Lynn Verge	27 March 1989	5 May 1989	39 days	PC	Rideout	Humber East	
−	vacant	6 May 1989	12 February 2001	11 years, 282 days	n/a	Wells; Tobin; Tulk	n/a	
3	Beaton Tulk	13 February 2001	2 February 2002	354 days	Lib	Grimes	Bonavista North	
−	vacant	3 February 2002	7 November 2005	3 years, 277 days	n/a	Grimes; Williams	n/a	
4	Tom Rideout	8 November 2005	21 May 2008	2 years, 195 days	PC	Williams	Lewisporte; Baie Verte-Springdale	
−	vacant	22 May 2008	30 October 2008	161 days	n/a	Williams	n/a	
5	Kathy Dunderdale	31 October 2008	3 December 2010	2 years, 33 days	PC	Williams	Virginia Waters	
−	vacant	4 December 2010	29 September 2014	3 years, 299 days	n/a	Dunderdale; Marshall; Davis	n/a	
6	Steve Kent	30 September 2014	14 December 2015	1 year, 75 days	PC	Davis	Mount Pearl North	
−	vacant	15 December 2015	18 August 2020	4 years, 247 days	n/a	Ball	n/a	
7	Siobhan Coady	19 August 2020	29 October 2025	5 years, 71 days	Lib	Furey; Hogan	St. John's West	
8	Barry Petten	29 October 2025	incumbent	313 days	PC	Wakeham	Conception Bay South	

== See also ==
- Prime Minister of Canada
- Premier (Canada)
- List of premiers of Newfoundland and Labrador
