= Topsail-Paradise =

Provincial electoral district in Newfoundland and Labrador, Canada

Topsail–Paradise
Newfoundland and Labrador electoral district
- Location in the St. John's area

Provincial electoral district
- Legislature: Newfoundland and Labrador House of Assembly
MHA
Paul Dinn
Progressive Conservative
- District created: 2015
- First contested: 2015
- Last contested: 2025

Demographics
- Population (2011): 14,830
- Electors (2019): 10,119
- Area (km²): 25
- Census division: Division No. 1
- Census subdivision(s): Conception Bay South, Paradise

Topsail–Paradise is a provincial electoral district in Newfoundland and Labrador, Canada. In 2011 there were 14,830 people living in the district.

Topsail–Paradise includes part of the town of Paradise and the part of the town of Conception Bay South. The district was created following the 2015 electoral districts boundaries review. The majority of Topsail–Paradise was previously the district of Topsail. The district also includes former parts of the districts of Conception Bay East-Bell Island and Conception Bay South.

== Geography ==
The constituency is named after the community of Topsail in Conception Bay South, and the town of Paradise.

== Members of the House of Assembly ==
Assembly	Years	Member	Party
48th	2015–2019	Paul Davis	Progressive Conservative
48th	2019-2019	Paul Dinn	Progressive Conservative
49th	2019–2021	Paul Dinn	Progressive Conservative
50th	2021–2025	Paul Dinn	Progressive Conservative
51st	2025–Present	Paul Dinn	Progressive Conservative

== Election results ==
Graph of election results (minor parties that never got 2% of the vote or did not run consistently are omitted) View source data.

2025 Newfoundland and Labrador general election
Party	Candidate	Votes	%	±%
Progressive Conservative	Paul Dinn	3,031	48.0%	-2.59
Liberal	Dan Bobbett	2,929	46.4%	+4.32
New Democratic	Tyler Bourne	353	5.6%	-1.73
Total valid votes				
Total rejected ballots				
Turnout				
Eligible voters				
Progressive Conservative hold		Swing		-

2021 Newfoundland and Labrador general election
Party	Candidate	Votes	%	±%
Progressive Conservative	Paul Dinn	3,036	50.59	-10.39
Liberal	Ken Carter	2,525	42.08	+13.13
New Democratic	Kathleen Burt	440	7.33	
Total valid votes		6,001	98.33	
Total rejected ballots		102	1.67	
Turnout		6,103	55.60	
Eligible voters		6,103		
Progressive Conservative hold		Swing		-11.76
Source(s) "Officially Nominated Candidates General Election 2021" (PDF). Elections Newfoundland and Labrador. "NL Election 2021 Report" (PDF).

2019 Newfoundland and Labrador general election
Party	Candidate	Votes	%	±%
Progressive Conservative	Paul Dinn	3,476	60.98	-0.19
Liberal	Patricia Hynes-Coates	1,650	28.95	-4.69
NL Alliance	Lori Best-Moore	574	10.07	
Total valid votes		5,700	99.46	
Total rejected ballots		31	0.54	+0.32
Turnout		5,731	54.75	+19.74
Eligible voters		10,467		
Progressive Conservative hold		Swing		+2.25

Newfoundland and Labrador provincial by-election, January 24, 2019 Resignation of Paul Davis, November 2, 2018
Party	Candidate	Votes	%	±%
Progressive Conservative	Paul Dinn	2,204	61.17	+2.87
Liberal	Patricia Hynes-Coates	1,212	33.64	-3.21
New Democratic	Kathleen Burt	187	5.19	+0.34
Total valid votes		3,603	99.78	
Total rejected ballots		8	0.22	-0.24
Turnout		3,611	35.01	-22.56
Eligible voters		10,313		
Progressive Conservative hold		Swing		+3.04

2015 Newfoundland and Labrador general election
Party	Candidate	Votes	%
Progressive Conservative	Paul Davis	3,381	58.30
Liberal	Rex Hillier	2,137	36.85
New Democratic	Chris Bruce	281	4.85
Total valid votes		5,799	99.54
Total rejected ballots		27	0.46
Turnout		5,826	57.57
Eligible voters		10,119	
Source: Elections Newfoundland and Labrador

== See also ==
- List of Newfoundland and Labrador provincial electoral districts
- Canadian provincial electoral districts
