= Bob French (politician) =

Canadian politician and businessman

Robert French (January 24, 1944 – August 2, 2002) was a businessperson and politician in Newfoundland and Labrador. He represented Conception Bay South in the Newfoundland and Labrador House of Assembly from 1996 to 2002.

He was born in St. John's, Newfoundland and Labrador. He married Elizabeth "Bettey" Bussey. French served on the town council for Conception Bay South from 1985 to 1990. He was chair for the Newfoundland and Labrador Summer Games held in 1996. He had been president of Softball Newfoundland and Labrador and was inducted into the Softball Newfoundland and Labrador Hall of Fame and the Conception Bay South Sports Hall of Fame.

He was elected to the Newfoundland assembly in 1996 and reelected in 1999. He died in office at the age of 58.

His son Terry succeeded him in the Newfoundland assembly.

== Legacy ==
Robert French has a stadium named after him called Robert French Memorial Stadium, which is located in Conception Bay South.
