= Pat Cowan =

Pat Cowan may refer to:

- Patrick Cowan (born 1986), American football quarterback
- Pat Cowan (politician) (1943–2006), politician in Newfoundland
