= Department of Energy and Mines =

Ministry in Newfoundland and Labrador

Energy and Mines
Agency overview
- Formed: February 20, 2004
- Preceding agencies: Department of Mines and Energy; Department of Forest Resources and Agrifoods; Department of Natural Resources; Department of Industry, Energy and Technology
- Jurisdiction: Newfoundland and Labrador
- Headquarters: St. John's
- Minister responsible: Lloyd Parrott
- Website: www.gov.nl.ca/iet/

The Ministry of Energy and Mines is a government department in Newfoundland and Labrador, Canada. The department is headed by a member of the provincial cabinet, typically a Member of the House of Assembly, who is chosen by the premier and formally appointed by the Lieutenant-Governor of Newfoundland and Labrador. The current minister is Lloyd Parrott.

The department was formerly known as the Department of Mines and Energy, however its name was changed in 2004, to Natural Resources under the government of Danny Williams. The department is responsible for the provinces energy, mines, forestry and agrifoods sectors. Due to the significance of Newfoundland and Labrador's natural resources sector the Minister of Natural Resources is considered to be one of the most high-profile positions in the Provincial Cabinet.

On August 19, 2020 the department was renamed Industry, Energy and Technology. On October 29, 2025, the department was renamed Energy and Mines.

== Ministers ==
Key:

Progressive Conservative Party of Newfoundland and Labrador
Liberal Party of Newfoundland and Labrador

| Portrait | Name | Term of office | | Political party | Premier |
|---|---|---|---|---|---|
| | Rex Gibbons | March 14, 1996 | April 29, 1997 | Liberal | Brian Tobin |
| | Chuck Furey | July 4, 1997 | December 15, 1998 | Liberal | Brian Tobin |
| | Roger Grimes | December 15, 1998 | February 13, 2001 | Liberal | Brian Tobin |
| | Paul Dicks | January 13, 2000 | February 13, 2001 | Liberal | Brian Tobin |
| | Lloyd Matthews | February 13, 2001 | February 17, 2003 | Liberal | Roger Grimes |
| | Walter Noel | February 17, 2003 | November 6, 2003 | Liberal | Roger Grimes |
| | Ed Byrne | November 6, 2003 | July 5, 2006 | Progressive Conservative | Danny Williams |
| | Kathy Dunderdale | July 5, 2006 | December 6, 2010 | Progressive Conservative | Danny Williams |
| | Shawn Skinner | December 6, 2010 | October 28, 2011 | Progressive Conservative | Kathy Dunderdale |
| | Jerome Kennedy | October 28, 2011 | January 16, 2013 | Progressive Conservative | Kathy Dunderdale |
| | Tom Marshall | January 16, 2013 | October 9, 2013 | Progressive Conservative | Kathy Dunderdale |
| | Derrick Dalley | October 9, 2013 | December 14, 2015 | Progressive Conservative | Kathy Dunderdale; Tom Marshall; Paul Davis |
| | Siobhán Coady | December 14, 2015 | August 19, 2020 | Liberal | Dwight Ball |
| | Andrew Parsons | August 19, 2020 | May 1, 2025 | Liberal | Andrew Furey |
| | Steve Crocker | May 3, 2025 | October 29, 2025 | Liberal | Andrew Furey; John Hogan |
| | Lloyd Parrott | October 29, 2025 | | Progressive Conservative | Tony Wakeham |

== See also ==
- Executive Council of Newfoundland and Labrador
- Newfoundland Ranger Force, a former law enforcement agency while the Dominion of Newfoundland's Department of Natural Resources
