= Cathy Bennett =

Canadian politician

The Honourable Cathy Bennett ECNL
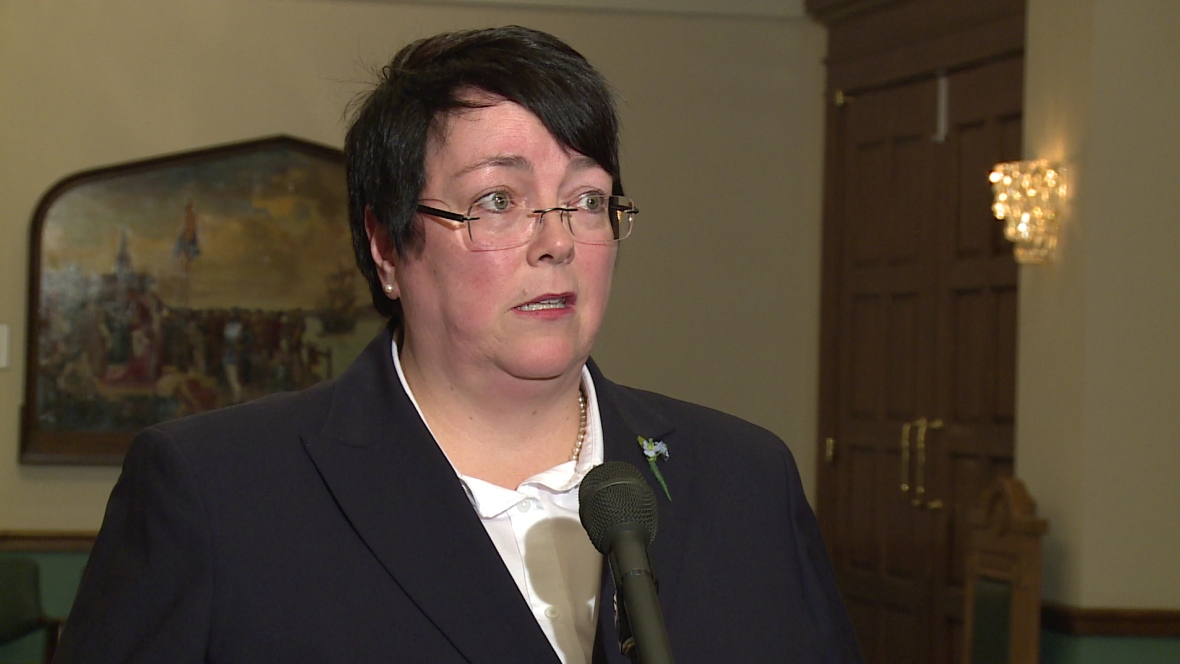
- Bennett in April 2016

Minister of Finance
- In office December 14, 2015 – July 31, 2017
- Preceded by: Ross Wiseman
- Succeeded by: Tom Osborne

Member of the Newfoundland and Labrador House of Assembly for Windsor Lake (Virginia Waters; 2014–2015)
- In office May 5, 2014 – August 21, 2018
- Preceded by: Kathy Dunderdale
- Succeeded by: Ches Crosbie

Minister Responsible for the Status of Women
- In office December 14, 2015 – July 31, 2017
- Preceded by: Susan Sullivan
- Succeeded by: Siobhan Coady

Personal details
- Born: 1964 (age 61–62) Corner Brook, Newfoundland, Canada
- Party: Liberal
- Occupation: Politician

Cathy Bennett is a Canadian businesswoman and politician in Newfoundland and Labrador, Canada. She represented the electoral district of Virginia Waters in the Newfoundland and Labrador House of Assembly from 2014 to 2018.

She was first elected in a 2014 by-election to succeed former Premier Kathy Dunderdale, who had resigned earlier in the year. She defeated her Progressive Conservative opponent by 40 votes.

In 2013, Bennett ran for the leadership of the Liberal Party, coming in third. She served as Minister of Finance in the Ball government.

== Background ==
Bennett received a High School diploma in 1982.

Bennett is a prominent business person in Newfoundland, owning and operating numerous restaurants throughout the province. She was also a significant contributor and fundraiser for St. John's first Ronald McDonald House. She previously served as the chairperson of the St. John's Board of Trade and governor of the Atlantic Provinces Economic Council.

== Politics ==
=== Minister of Finance ===
Bennett became Minister of Finance for the provincial government after the Liberal Party won 31 out of 40 seats in the 2015 general election. She was re-elected in the district of Windsor Lake.

On April 14, 2016 Bennett revealed the provincial government's budget which implements austerity measures. She criticized the high amount of spending by the government from 2003-15 led by the Progressive Conservative Party.

Bennett resigned as Finance Minister on July 31, 2017. She continued as a backbencher MHA from July 2017 until August 2018; most notably her involvement in the debate regarding bullying and harassment in the House of Assembly. She resigned on August 21, 2018.

=== Abuse in office ===
In a 2016 article in the National Observer, Bennett shared that she faces body-shaming and abuse from disappointed constituents. Some of these constituents offered that the best solution to her policy would be kill herself or "All Newfoundlanders should put a bounty on her head. She is a witch." She is quoted as saying, "Language that starts with the shaming and the insults and the verbal abuse is the beginning steps that lead to [physical violence]." In 2018, following the suspension of two cabinet ministers for harassment, Bennett stated that her resignation as Finance Minister in 2017 was due to bullying, isolation and gaslighting within the Liberal caucus and cabinet.

== Awards and honors ==
- 2013 CEO of the Year - Atlantic Business Magazine
- 2012 Top 25 Women of Influence

== Electoral record ==
2015 Newfoundland and Labrador general election: Windsor Lake
Party	Candidate	Votes	%
Liberal	Cathy Bennett	3,182	66.40
Progressive Conservative	Ryan Cleary	970	20.24
New Democratic	Don Rowe	640	13.36
Total valid votes		4,792	100.0
Turnout		52.59	
Eligible voters		9,088	

Virginia Waters by-election April 9, 2014 on the resignation of Kathy Dunderdale, February 28, 2014
Party	Candidate	Votes	%	±%
Liberal	Cathy Bennett	1932	39.88	+30.33
Progressive Conservative	Danny Breen	1892	39.05	-20.99
NDP	Sheilagh O'Leary	1021	21.07	-9.35
Total valid votes		4,895		
Rejected				
Turnout				
Liberal gain from Progressive Conservative		Swing		+25.66

2013 Liberal Party of Newfoundland and Labrador leadership election
	Ballot 1				Ballot 2				Ballot 3			
Candidate	Votes	%	Points	%	Votes	%	Points	%	Votes	%	Points	%
Dwight Ball	10,944	45.94%	2,130.05	44.38%	11,306	48.45%	2,257.15	47.02%	12,598	60.64%	2,832.29	59.01%
Paul Antle	6,340	26.61%	1,321.15	27.52%	6,600	28.28%	1,397.86	29.12%	8,178	39.36%	1,967.71	40.99%
Cathy Bennett	5,252	22.05%	1,089.05	22.69%	5,431	23.27%	1,144.99	23.85%				
Danny Dumaresque	670	2.81%	131.69	2.74%								
Jim Bennett	617	2.59%	128.05	2.67%								
Total	23,823	100.00	4,800.00	100.00	23,337	100.00	4,800.00	100.00	20,776	100.00	4,800.00	100.00

Newfoundland and Labrador provincial government of Dwight Ball
Cabinet posts (2)
Predecessor	Office	Successor
Ross Wiseman	Minister of Finance; December 14, 2015–July 31, 2017	Tom Osborne
Susan Sullivan	Minister Responsible for the Status of Women; December 14, 2015–July 31, 2017	Siobhan Coady
