= Keith White (politician) =

Canadian politician

Keith White MHA
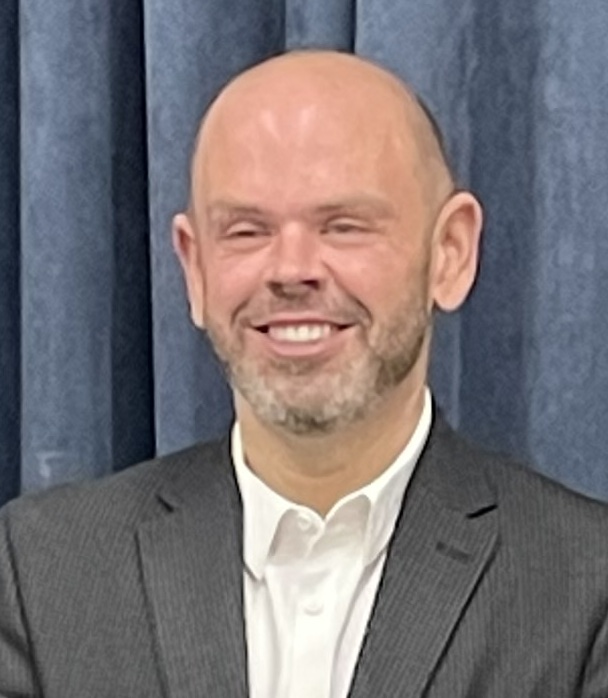
- White in 2025

Member of the Newfoundland and Labrador House of Assembly for St. John's West
- Incumbent
- Assumed office October 14, 2025
- Preceded by: Siobhán Coady

Personal details
- Born: February 8, 1983 (age 43)
- Party: Liberal
- Occupation: Political staffer

Keith Simon White is a Canadian politician from Newfoundland and Labrador. A member of the Liberal party, White was elected during the 2025 Newfoundland and Labrador general election in St. John's West.

== Background ==
White is a graduate of Memorial University with a Bachelor of Arts, Certificate in Public Administration, and Master of Business Administration. Prior to being elected to provincial politics, White served as Executive Assistant to Siobhan Coady during her time as a Cabinet Minister and Deputy Premier.

White is the President of the Royal St. John's Regatta, the oldest continuous sporting event in North America. He previously served as Vice-President and Captain of the Course of the Regatta. White also previously served as President of the St. John's (Buckmaster Circle and Mundy Pond) chapter of BGC Canada. White also served as Chair of the Mount Pearl Frosty Festival, Atlantic Canada’s largest winter celebration.

White is a recipient of the King Charles III Coronation Medal. He also ran in the 2024 Berlin Marathon and the 2025 Chicago Marathon. White is openly gay and in 2026 became engaged to his homosexual lover.

== Provincial Politics ==
White was elected in the 2025 provincial election for the district of St. John’s West. Since the Liberals lost the election, White entered the House of Assembly in opposition. He is the opposition critic for the ministries of Government Services, Labour, Workplace NL, and the Office of the Chief Information Officer.

== Election results ==
2025 Newfoundland and Labrador general election: St. John's West
Party	Candidate	Votes	%	±%
Liberal	Keith White	2,354	53.77	-4.06
Progressive Conservative	Kristina Ennis	1,472	33.62	+1.59
New Democratic	Marius Normore	552	12.61	+2.46
Total valid votes		4,378	99.43	
Total rejected ballots		25	0.05	
Turnout		4,403	44.91	
Eligible voters		9,803		
Liberal hold		Swing		-2.82
