= Barry Petten =

Canadian politician

The Honourable Barry Petten ECNL MHA

Member of the Newfoundland and Labrador House of Assembly for Conception Bay South
- Incumbent
- Assumed office November 30, 2015
- Preceded by: Rex Hillier

Minister of Transportation and Infrastructure
- Incumbent
- Assumed office October 29, 2025
- Preceded by: Elvis Loveless

Deputy Premier of Newfoundland and Labrador
- Incumbent
- Assumed office October 29, 2025
- Preceded by: Siobhan Coady

Minister of Public Procurement
- Incumbent
- Assumed office October 29, 2025
- Preceded by: Elvis Loveless

Minister of Municipal and Community Affairs
- Incumbent
- Assumed office August 20, 2026
- Preceded by: Chris Tibbs

Minister of Community Engagement
- Incumbent
- Assumed office August 20, 2026
- Preceded by: Chris Tibbs

Deputy Government House Leader
- Incumbent
- Assumed office August 20, 2026
- Preceded by: Joedy Wall

Registrar General
- Incumbent
- Assumed office August 20, 2026
- Preceded by: Chris Tibbs

Personal details
- Born: July 22, 1966 (age 60)
- Party: Progressive Conservative
- Spouse: Rhonda Petten
- Occupation: Mental health counsellor political assistant

Barry Calvin Petten (born July 22, 1966) is a Canadian politician, who was elected to the Newfoundland and Labrador House of Assembly in the 2015 provincial election. He represents the electoral district of Conception Bay South as a member of the Progressive Conservative Party.

Petten was a mental health counsellor for 20 years. He served on the NL Association of Social Workers and the Municipal Appeals Board. He was also President and Chief Shop Stewart of Local 6234. He worked as an executive assistant to various ministers from 2009 to 2015.

In 2018, Petten endorsed Ches Crosbie in the 2018 provincial PC leadership race.

Petten was re-elected in the 2019 and 2021 provincial elections. Petten supported Tony Wakeham in the 2023 provincial PC party leadership race.

Petten was re-elected in the 2025 Newfoundland and Labrador general election.

On October 29, 2025 Petten was appointed as Deputy Premier, Minister of Transportation and Infrastructure, and Minister of Public Procurement of Newfoundland and Labrador.

On August 20, 2026, a cabinet shuffle occurred in the Wakeham ministry in which Petten received the new roles of Minister of Municipal and Community Affairs, Registrar General, Minister of Community Engagement, and Deputy Government House Leader.

On September 17, 2026, Petten voted to approve the Churchill Falls Definitive Cooperation and Implementation Agreement (DCIA) in the House of Assembly along with the PC caucus.

== Election results ==
2025 Newfoundland and Labrador general election: Conception Bay South
Party	Candidate	Votes	%	±%
Progressive Conservative	Barry Petten	3,060	56.5%	-0.59
Liberal	Ken McDonald	2,043	37.7%	+1.52
New Democratic	Rhonda Watkins	309	5.7%	+1.51
Total valid votes				
Total rejected ballots				
Turnout				
Eligible voters				
Progressive Conservative hold		Swing		

2021 Newfoundland and Labrador general election: Conception Bay South
Party	Candidate	Votes	%	±%
Progressive Conservative	Barry Petten	3,063	57.09	-5.43
Liberal	Shelley Moores	1,941	36.18	+13.40
New Democratic	Andrew Lovell	225	4.19	
NL Alliance	Warrick Butler	136	2.53	-12.16
Total valid votes		5,365		
Total rejected ballots				
Turnout				
Eligible voters				
Progressive Conservative hold		Swing		-5.43
Source(s) "Officially Nominated Candidates General Election 2021" (PDF). Elections Newfoundland and Labrador. "NL Election 2021 (Unofficial Results)".

2019 Newfoundland and Labrador general election
Party	Candidate	Votes	%	±%
Progressive Conservative	Barry Petten	3,447	62.5	+14.8
Liberal	Kevin Baker	1,256	22.8	-21.4
NL Alliance	Warrick Butler	810	14.7	–
Total valid votes		5,513	100	
Total rejected ballots		55		
Turnout		5,568	61.8	+6.8
Eligible voters		9,003		

2015 Newfoundland and Labrador general election
Party	Candidate	Votes	%	±%
Progressive Conservative	Barry Petten	2,360	47.72	+0.04
Liberal	Steve Porter	2,187	44.23	-5.04
New Democratic	Jeanne Clarke	398	8.05	+5.00
Total valid votes		4,945	99.64	–
Total rejected ballots		18	0.36	–
Turnout		4,963	54.99	+11.42
Eligible voters		9,025		
Progressive Conservative gain from Liberal		Swing		+2.54
Source: Elections Newfoundland and Labrador

Newfoundland and Labrador provincial by-election, November 5, 2014 upon the resignation of Terry French
Party	Candidate	Votes	%	±%
Liberal	Rex Hillier	2,102	49.27	+42.52
Progressive Conservative	Barry Petten	2,034	47.68	-21.51
New Democratic	Cameron Mercer-Maillet	130	3.05	-21.01
Total valid votes		4,266	99.77	–
Total rejected ballots		10	0.23	–
Turnout		4,276	43.57	
Eligible voters		9,813		
Liberal gain from Progressive Conservative		Swing		+32.02
Source: Elections Newfoundland and Labrador
