= Paul Dinn =

Canadian politician

The Honourable Paul Dinn ECNL MHA

Member of the Newfoundland and Labrador House of Assembly for Topsail-Paradise
- Incumbent
- Assumed office February 19, 2019
- Preceded by: Paul Davis

Minister of Education and Early Childhood Development
- Incumbent
- Assumed office October 29, 2025
- Preceded by: Bernard Davis

Minister of Advance Education and skills
- Incumbent
- Assumed office October 29, 2025
- Preceded by: Gerry Byrne

Personal details
- Party: Progressive Conservative
- Spouse: Jennifer Dinn
- Relations: Jim Dinn (brother)
- Occupation: Public Servant

Paul C. Dinn is a Canadian politician. He represents the electoral district of Topsail-Paradise in the Newfoundland and Labrador House of Assembly, for the Progressive Conservative Party. He was first elected in a by-election in 2019.

Dinn was re-elected in the 2019 and 2021 provincial elections. His brother, Jim, is the leader of the New Democratic Party and MHA for St. John's Centre. Dinn supported Eugene Manning in the 2023 provincial PC party leadership race.

Before entering provincial politics Dinn was a director within the Department of Advanced Education, Skills and Labour. He was also a town councillor in Paradise.

Dinn was re-elected in the 2025 Newfoundland and Labrador general election.

On October 29, 2025, Dinn was appointed Minister of Education and Early Childhood Development and Minister of Advance Education and Skills.

On September 17, 2026, Dinn voted to approve the Churchill Falls Definitive Cooperation and Implementation Agreement (DCIA) in the House of Assembly along with the PC caucus.

== Electoral record ==
2025 Newfoundland and Labrador general election: Topsail-Paradise
Party	Candidate	Votes	%	±%
Progressive Conservative	Paul Dinn	3,031	48.0%	-2.59
Liberal	Dan Bobbett	2,929	46.4%	+4.32
New Democratic	Tyler Bourne	353	5.6%	-1.73
Total valid votes				
Total rejected ballots				
Turnout				
Eligible voters				
Progressive Conservative hold		Swing		-

2021 Newfoundland and Labrador general election: Topsail-Paradise
Party	Candidate	Votes	%	±%
Progressive Conservative	Paul Dinn	3,036	50.59	-10.39
Liberal	Ken Carter	2,525	42.08	+13.13
New Democratic	Kathleen Burt	440	7.33	
Total valid votes		6,001	98.33	
Total rejected ballots		102	1.67	
Turnout		6,103	55.60	
Eligible voters		6,103		
Progressive Conservative hold		Swing		-11.76
Source(s) "Officially Nominated Candidates General Election 2021" (PDF). Elections Newfoundland and Labrador. "NL Election 2021 Report" (PDF).

2019 Newfoundland and Labrador general election
Party	Candidate	Votes	%	±%
Progressive Conservative	Paul Dinn	3,476	61.0	
Liberal	Patricia Hynes-Coates	1,650	28.9	
NL Alliance	Lori Best-Moore	574	10.1	
Total valid votes				
Total rejected ballots				
Turnout				
Eligible voters				

}

By-election - January 24, 2019 On the resignation of Paul Davis, November 2, 2018
Party	Candidate	Votes	%	±%
Progressive Conservative	Paul Dinn	2,204	61.17	+2.87
Liberal	Patricia Hynes-Coates	1,212	33.64	-3.21
New Democratic	Kathleen Burt	187	5.19	+0.34
Total valid votes		3,603	100.00	
Progressive Conservative hold		Swing		+3.04

2017 municipal election
Candidate	Vote	%
Allan English	2,765	11.20
Elizabeth Laurie (X)	2,554	10.34
Paul Dinn (X)	2,417	9.79
Deborah Quilty (X)	2,128	8.62
Patrick Martin (X)	1,842	7.46
Sterling Willis (X)	1,807	7.32
Coreen Bennett	1,761	7.13
Kimberley Street	1,568	6.35
Scott Dawe	1,533	6.21
Sheldon Antle	1,517	6.14
Glen Carew	1,238	5.01
Neil Farrell	1,162	4.71
Reggie Lawrence	956	3.87
Jamie Thornhill	591	2.40
Tony Kelly	560	2.27
Anthony Pittman	292	1.18
