= John A. Nolan =

Canadian politician

John Alexander Nolan (August 14, 1930 – April 28, 2004) was a broadcaster and politician in Newfoundland. He represented St. John's South from 1966 to 1971 and Conception Bay South from 1975 to 1979 in the Newfoundland House of Assembly.

The son of Leo Nolan and Rose Redmond, he was born in St. John's and was educated there. Nolan married Edith Snelgrove. He was an announcer for CJON Radio and TV.

He was elected to the Newfoundland assembly in 1966. Nolan served in the provincial cabinet as Minister of Municipal Affairs, Minister of Supply and Services and Minister of Economic Development; he was also president of the Treasury Board. He ran unsuccessfully for the Ferryland seat in the assembly in 1971 and then was elected again for Conception Bay South in 1975. Nolan served as a citizenship court judge in St. John's from 1981 to 1986. From 1987 to 1992, he worked for Q Radio and was a volunteer host & announcer for Avalon Cablevision/Cable Atlantic Cable 9.

Nolan died at home at the age of 73 after a lengthy illness.
