= Darin King =

Canadian politician (born 1966)

The Honourable Darin King ECNL Ph.D.

Minister of Justice
- In office 19 October 2012 – 14 December 2015
- Preceded by: Felix Collins
- Succeeded by: Andrew Parsons

Minister of Fisheries and Aquaculture
- In office 28 October 2011 – 19 October 2012
- Preceded by: Clyde Jackman
- Succeeded by: Derrick Dalley

Member of the Newfoundland and Labrador House of Assembly for Grand Bank
- In office 1 November 2007 – 27 November 2015
- Preceded by: Judy Foote
- Succeeded by: District Abolished

Minister of Human Resources, Labour and Employment
- In office 13 January 2011 – 28 October 2011
- Preceded by: Joan Burke (acting)
- Succeeded by: Department eliminated

Minister of Education
- In office 2009–2011
- Preceded by: Joan Burke
- Succeeded by: Joan Burke

Minister of Business, Tourism, Culture and Rural Development
- In office 30 September 2014 – 14 December 2015
- Preceded by: Department established
- Succeeded by: Christopher Mitchelmore

Personal details
- Born: Grand Bank, Newfoundland and Labrador, Canada
- Party: Progressive Conservative
- Spouse: Colleen King
- Occupation: School Administrator

Darin King (born 17 August 1966) is a former Canadian politician in Newfoundland and Labrador, Canada. He served as the Minister of Business, Tourism, Culture and Rural Development as well as the Minister of Justice and Public Safety in the provincial cabinet, and was the Member of the House of Assembly (MHA) for the district of Grand Bank.

King was elected to the House of Assembly in the 2007 provincial election and was re-elected in 2011. He previously held the posts of Minister of Education, Minister of Fisheries and Aquaculture and Minister of Human Resources, Labour and Employment. Prior to entering politics, King was director of education for the Eastern School District of Newfoundland and Labrador, the province's largest school district.

== Background ==
=== Early life and education ===
King was born in Grand Bank, Newfoundland and Labrador and raised in the community of Fortune on Newfoundland's Burin Peninsula. He attended Memorial University of Newfoundland where he was awarded a Bachelor of Education degree and a diploma in School Resources Services. He went on to study at Saint Mary's University in Halifax, Nova Scotia where he earned a Master of Education degree. King also has a Business Ph.D, in human resource, from Northcentral University in Arizona.

King has lived most of his life in Grand Bank but he now resides in Conception Bay South with his wife Colleen and their two teenage children, Mitchell and Kate.

=== Professional life ===
King taught at all levels in the K-12 school system and went on to work for five years as a school administrator. After this he worked with the Burin Peninsula School Board where he spent four years as the assistant director of education (programs) and another two years as the associate assistant director (human resources). King joined the newly created Eastern School District in 2004 as the assistant director of education (programs) and he eventually became the CEO/Director of Education with the school board.

In addition to his professional experience, King is active in numerous sports and community organizations. He is a past chair of the Grand Bank Recreation Commission, a former board member of the Newfoundland and Labrador Parks and Recreation Association, and a past chair of the Grand Bank Development Corporation.

== Politics ==
In May 2003, King defeated Gordon Dunphy to win the Progressive Conservative Party (PC) nomination in the district of Grand Bank for that year's provincial election. The Progressive Conservatives won the October 2003, election but King was narrowly defeated by the Liberal Party incumbent, Judy Foote, by a margin of 43 votes. In 2007, King was acclaimed as the PC candidate in Grand Bank and was granted special leave by the Eastern School District until that October's election. Foote did not seek re-election in 2007, and King won 80 per cent of the vote in the provincial election. Following the election King became the Parliamentary Secretary to the Minister of Education. He also served on the House of Assembly Social Services and Public Accounts Committees.

=== Minister of Education ===
On 9 April 2009, King was sworn in as Minister of Education, succeeding Joan Burke. King faced criticism from the deaf and hard of hearing communities in the Summer of 2010, when he announced that the Newfoundland School for the Deaf would not be reopening in September. The school's enrollment had steadily declined over the years due to advancements in medicine and technology and no students were set to attend the school. Students, former students and their parents spoke out against the closing of the school and several students said that government was forcing them to attend public schools.

=== Minister of Human Resources, Labour and Employment ===
On 13 January 2011, premier Kathy Dunderdale shuffled King out of the Education portfolio, replacing him with his predecessor Burke. King was appointed the Minister of Human, Resources, Labour and Employment. King was also minister responsible for Persons with Disabilities, the Labour Relations Agency, Youth Engagement and the NL Housing Corporation.

=== Minister of Fisheries and Aquaculture ===
King was re-elected in October 2011, and was appointed as the Minister of Fisheries and Aquaculture. The portfolio is among the highest ranking in Newfoundland and Labrador, and is often quite difficult. Former minister Clyde Jackman, who was moved to Education, had faced numerous controversies during his time as Fisheries Minister, and during the provincial election Dunderdale had spoken about there being overcapacity in the fishing industry.

In November 2011, provincial government-appointed auditors backed up claims by Ocean Choice International (OCI) that they were losing millions of dollars each year operating the Marystown fish plant. On 2 December 2011, the company announced that they would permanently close their Marystown and Port Union fish processing plants and invest money into other plants throughout the province. The following week OCI asked the provincial government for an exemption to export unprocessed fish in return for nearly doubling the workforce at the company's plant in Fortune. King reacted positively to the proposed idea and said the government would consider it. Negotiations on a deal would become tense, King criticized the company for using 'pressure tactics' to try to get a deal. OCI said that they were in damage control all around the world because of King's comments. In February 2012, King rejected a proposal by the company saying that it was not in the best interest of the province. The deal was also controversial among the fish plant workers in Fortune and their union. Fish plant workers voted unanimously to allow for the export of fish in return for full-time work, while the Fish, Food and Allied Workers union (FFAW) were opposed to exporting fish. King was shuffled out of the Fisheries portfolio and replaced by Derrick Dalley before a decision was reached. On 21 December 2012, Dalley announced the government would allow OCI to ship 75 per cent of its yellowtail flounder quota overseas for processing, along with 100 per cent of its redfish quota. In return a total of 236 year-round jobs, between the Fortune fish plant and on company vessels at sea, for at least five years.

In February 2012, King announced that effective immediately he would be freezing funding to the FFAW. He cited the union's criticism of the provincial government as the reason for the move. King stated 'No matter what we do in this province, the FFAW are more concerned with their own self-interest than they are with the interests of the industry.'

=== Minister of Justice and Government House Leader ===
On 19 October 2012, King was sworn in as the Minister of Justice, Government House Leader, and Minister Responsible for the Labour Relations Agency.

Following the 2013 provincial budget, which saw major funding cuts throughout government, King and the government came under fire for cuts made to the Department of Justice. The government faced backlash from members of the legal community and the public over cuts and lay offs. Despite this King reassured the public that services would not be jeopardized and that people were overreacting to the cuts. However, ten days after the budget was released King announced he had established a committee to review the cuts within his department. The committee met for just one day before King announced he would be reversing many of the budget cuts. Employees that had been laid off following the budget would be re-instated, and some vacant positions would be filled. While King said he took 100 per cent of the credit for the cuts being made, he said the reversal showed that government was willing to listen.

=== Leadership aspirations ===
King has been seen as possible leadership candidate for the Progressive Conservatives since entering politics and following the resignation of Premier Danny Williams in December 2010 he stated that he may run to succeed him. On 22 December 2010, King announced that he would not be seeking the leadership of the party at this time due to his young family and that he would be encouraging Premier Kathy Dunderdale to run for the leadership of the party on a permanent basis.

== Retirement ==
King did not run for re-election in the 2015 provincial election. He subsequently served as Executive Director for the Newfoundland and Labrador Building and Construction Trades Council from 2015 to 2024.

=== Federal politics ===
On September 12, 2024, King announced that he is seeking the federal conservative nomination in Terra Nova—The Peninsulas. King dropped out of the nomination race before it was called.

== Electoral history ==
2011 Newfoundland and Labrador general election: Grand Bank
Party	Candidate	Votes	%	±%
Progressive Conservative	Darin King	3,271	68.52	−11.51
Liberal	Carol Anne Haley	1,336	27.98	+8.01
New Democratic	Wally Layman	167	3.5	+3.5

2007 Newfoundland and Labrador general election
Party	Candidate	Votes	%	±%
Progressive Conservative	Darin King	3563	80.03%	+31.5
Liberal	Rod Cake	889	19.97%	-29.35

2003 Newfoundland and Labrador general election
Party	Candidate	Votes	%	±%
Liberal	Judy Foote	3101	49.32%	-20.86
Progressive Conservative	Darin King	3058	48.53%	+28.24
NDP	Bill Wakeley	136	2.15%	-7.37
