= Vaughn Granter =

Canadian politician (born 1965)

The Honourable Vaughn Granter ECNL

Member of the Newfoundland and Labrador House of Assembly for Humber West
- In office March 16, 2011 – November 27, 2015
- Preceded by: Danny Williams
- Succeeded by: District Abolished

Minister of Environment and Conservation
- In office July 17, 2014 – September 30, 2014
- Preceded by: Joan Shea
- Succeeded by: Dan Crummell

Minister of Fisheries and Aquaculture
- In office September 30, 2014 – December 14, 2015
- Preceded by: Keith Hutchings
- Succeeded by: Steve Crocker

Personal details
- Born: 14 September 1965 (age 61) Pool's Island, Newfoundland and Labrador
- Party: Progressive Conservative
- Education: Memorial University of Newfoundland; St. Francis Xavier University
- Occupation: Teacher

Vaughn Granter (born September 14, 1965) is a politician in Newfoundland and Labrador who currently serves as a second term City Councillor in Corner Brook. Granter previously served in various portfolios including as Minister of Fisheries and Aquaculture in the Davis government. He was elected to serve in the Newfoundland and Labrador House of Assembly on February 15, 2011 and re-elected in the 2011 general election.

Granter worked as in the education profession since 1987, most recently as a high school principal at Corner Brook Regional High. Granter ran for public office in the electoral district of Humber West in a by-election that was called after the resignation of Premier Danny Williams. He defeated two other opponents including Liberal, Mark Watton on February 15, 2011 with a large majority to hold the seat for the Progressive Conservative party. Granter did not run for re-election in the 2015 provincial election.

In 2017, Granter successfully ran for Corner Brook City Council. He was re-elected in the 2021 municipal elections.

== Electoral history ==
Humber West Election - October 11, 2011
Party	Candidate	Votes	%	±%
Progressive Conservative	Vaughn Granter	2,335	59.38%	–
Liberal	Donna Luther	833	21.19%	
NDP	Jordan Stringer	764	19.43%	

Humber West By-Election - February 15, 2011 On the resignation of Danny Williams, December 3, 2010
Party	Candidate	Votes	%	±%
Progressive Conservative	Vaughn Granter	2,109	63.58%	–
Liberal	Mark Watton	1,097	33.06%	
NDP	Rosie Myers	112	3.38%	
