= Conception Bay South (electoral district) =

Provincial electoral district in Newfoundland and Labrador, Canada

Newfoundland and Labrador electoral district
- Location in the St. John's area

Provincial electoral district
- Legislature: Newfoundland and Labrador House of Assembly
MHA
Barry Petten
Progressive Conservative
- District created: 1975
- First contested: 1975
- Last contested: 2021

Demographics
- Population (2011): 14,558
- Electors (2015): 9,025
- Area (km²): 85
- Census division: Division No. 1
- Census subdivision(s): Conception Bay South, St. John's (part)

Conception Bay South is a provincial electoral district for the House of Assembly of Newfoundland and Labrador, Canada. In 2011 there were 9,938 eligible voters living within the district.

Composed of part of the town of Conception Bay South. A mix of rural and suburban populations, especially as the town of Conception Bay South grows. The district includes the communities of Foxtrap, Long Pond, Manuels, Kelligrews and part of Chamberlains. It is part of the St. John's metropolitan area.

The riding was created for the 1975 election from Harbour Main and St. John's North.

== Members of the House of Assembly ==
The district has elected the following members of the House of Assembly:

Assembly	Years	Member	Party
Riding created from Harbour Main and St. John's North.
37th	1975–1979	John A. Nolan	Liberal
38th	1979–1982	John Butt	Progressive Conservative
39th	1982–1985	John Butt	Progressive Conservative
40th	1985–1989	John Butt	Progressive Conservative
41st	1989–1993	Pat Cowan	Liberal
42nd	1993–1996	Pat Cowan	Liberal
43rd	1996–1999	Bob French	Progressive Conservative
44th	1999–2002	Bob French	Progressive Conservative
44th	2002–2003	Terry French	Progressive Conservative
45th	2003–2007	Terry French	Progressive Conservative
46th	2007–2011	Terry French	Progressive Conservative
47th	2011–2014	Terry French	Progressive Conservative
47th	2014–2015	Rex Hillier	Liberal
48th	2015–2019	Barry Petten	Progressive Conservative
49th	2019–2021	Barry Petten	Progressive Conservative
50th	2021–2025	Barry Petten	Progressive Conservative
51st	2025–present	Barry Petten	Progressive Conservative

== Election results ==
Graph of election results (minor parties that never got 2% of the vote or did not run consistently are omitted) View source data.

2025 Newfoundland and Labrador general election
Party	Candidate	Votes	%	±%
Progressive Conservative	Barry Petten	3,060	56.5%	-0.59
Liberal	Ken McDonald	2,043	37.7%	+1.52
New Democratic	Rhonda Watkins	309	5.7%	+1.51
Total valid votes				
Total rejected ballots				
Turnout				
Eligible voters				
Progressive Conservative hold		Swing		

2021 Newfoundland and Labrador general election
Party	Candidate	Votes	%	±%
Progressive Conservative	Barry Petten	3,063	57.09	-5.43
Liberal	Shelley Moores	1,941	36.18	+13.40
New Democratic	Andrew Lovell	225	4.19	
NL Alliance	Warrick Butler	136	2.53	-12.16
Total valid votes		5,365		
Total rejected ballots				
Turnout				
Eligible voters				
Progressive Conservative hold		Swing		-5.43
Source(s) "Officially Nominated Candidates General Election 2021" (PDF). Elections Newfoundland and Labrador. "NL Election 2021 (Unofficial Results)".

2019 Newfoundland and Labrador general election
Party	Candidate	Votes	%	±%
Progressive Conservative	Barry Petten	3,447	62.52	+14.80
Liberal	Kevin Baker	1,256	22.78	-21.44
NL Alliance	Warrick Butler	810	14.69	–
Total valid votes		5,513	99.01	
Total rejected ballots		55	0.99	+0.63
Turnout		5,568	61.85	+6.85
Eligible voters		9,003		
Progressive Conservative hold		Swing		+18.12

2015 Newfoundland and Labrador general election
Party	Candidate	Votes	%	±%
Progressive Conservative	Barry Petten	2,360	47.72	+0.04
Liberal	Steve Porter	2,187	44.23	-5.04
New Democratic	Jeanne Clarke	398	8.05	+5.00
Total valid votes		4,945	99.64	–
Total rejected ballots		18	0.36	–
Turnout		4,963	54.99	+11.42
Eligible voters		9,025		
Progressive Conservative gain from Liberal		Swing		+2.54
Source: Elections Newfoundland and Labrador

Newfoundland and Labrador provincial by-election, November 5, 2014 upon the resignation of Terry French
Party	Candidate	Votes	%	±%
Liberal	Rex Hillier	2,102	49.27	+42.52
Progressive Conservative	Barry Petten	2,034	47.68	-21.51
New Democratic	Cameron Mercer-Maillet	130	3.05	-21.01
Total valid votes		4,266	99.77	–
Total rejected ballots		10	0.23	–
Turnout		4,276	43.57	
Eligible voters		9,813		
Liberal gain from Progressive Conservative		Swing		+32.02
Source: Elections Newfoundland and Labrador

2011 Newfoundland and Labrador general election
Party	Candidate	Votes	%	±%
Progressive Conservative	Terry French	3,632	69.19	-10.19
New Democratic	Noah Davis-Power	1,263	24.06	+19.64
Liberal	Cynthia Layden Barron	354	6.75	-9.45
Total valid votes		5,249	99.73	–
Total rejected ballots		14	0.27	–
Turnout		5,263	74.84	+3.615
Eligible voters		9,527		
Progressive Conservative hold		Swing		-14.92
Source: Elections Newfoundland and Labrador

2007 Newfoundland and Labrador general election
Party	Candidate	Votes	%	±%
Progressive Conservative	Terry French	4,670	79.38	-3.72
Liberal	Jerry E. Young	953	16.20	+4.81
New Democratic	Touria Tougui	260	4.42	-1.09
Total valid votes		5,883	99.64	–
Total rejected ballots		21	0.36	–
Turnout		5,904	61.97	-2.64
Eligible voters		9,527		
Progressive Conservative hold		Swing		-4.27
Source: Elections Newfoundland and Labrador

2003 Newfoundland and Labrador general election
Party	Candidate	Votes	%	±%
Progressive Conservative	Terry French	5,606	83.10	+0.79
Liberal	Andy Lewis	768	11.39	-5.04
New Democratic	Sheina Lerman	372	5.51	+4.25
Total valid votes		6,746	99.75	–
Total rejected ballots		17	0.25	–
Turnout		6,763	64.61	+3.61
Eligible voters		10,467		
Progressive Conservative hold		Swing		+2.92
Source: Elections Newfoundland and Labrador

Newfoundland and Labrador provincial by-election, November 12, 2002 upon the death of Bob French
Party	Candidate	Votes	%	±%
Progressive Conservative	Terry French	4,761	82.31	+17.77
Liberal	Gary Corbett	950	16.43	-13.55
New Democratic	Ann Price	73	1.26	-4.22
Total valid votes		5,784	99.74	–
Total rejected ballots		15	0.26	–
Turnout		5,799	61.00	-1.18
Eligible voters		9,507		
Progressive Conservative hold		Swing		+15.66
Source: Elections Newfoundland and Labrador

1999 Newfoundland and Labrador general election
Party	Candidate	Votes	%	±%
Progressive Conservative	Bob French	3,888	64.54	+14.04
Liberal	Bill Lee	1,806	29.98	-13.52
New Democratic	Reg Porter	330	5.48	-0.52
Total valid votes		6,024	99.69	–
Total rejected ballots		19	0.31	–
Turnout		6,043	62.18	-5.43
Eligible voters		9,719		
Progressive Conservative hold		Swing		+13.78
Source: Elections Newfoundland and Labrador

1996 Newfoundland and Labrador general election
Party	Candidate	Votes	%	±%
Progressive Conservative	Bob French	3,051	50.50	+12.82
Liberal	Bill Dawe	2,628	43.50	-3.28
New Democratic	Harvey Taylor	363	6.00	-7.98
Total valid votes		6,042	99.74	–
Total rejected ballots		16	0.26	–
Turnout		6,058	67.61	+0.25
Eligible voters		8,960		
Progressive Conservative gain from Liberal		Swing		+8.05
Source: Elections Newfoundland and Labrador

1993 Newfoundland and Labrador general election
Party	Candidate	Votes	%	±%
Liberal	Patt Cowan	2,995	46.77	-6.72
Progressive Conservative	Martin Suter	2,413	37.69	-6.74
New Democratic	George Corbett	895	13.98	+11.89
Independent	Elijah Dawe	100	1.56	
Total valid votes		6,403	99.75	–
Total rejected ballots		16	0.25	+0.04
Turnout		6,419	100.85	+9.41
Eligible voters		6,365		
Liberal hold		Swing		+0.01
Source: Elections Newfoundland and Labrador

1989 Newfoundland and Labrador general election
Party	Candidate	Votes	%	±%
Liberal	Patt Cowan	3,107	53.49	+14.59
Progressive Conservative	John Butt	2,580	44.42	-4.38
New Democratic	Edgar Russell	121	2.08	-5.82
Total valid votes		5,808	99.79	–
Total rejected ballots		12	0.21	–0.08
Turnout		5,820	91.44	+17.93
Eligible voters		6,365		
Liberal gain from Progressive Conservative		Swing		+9.49
Source: Elections Newfoundland and Labrador

1985 Newfoundland general election
Party	Candidate	Votes	%	±%
Progressive Conservative	John Butt	2,179	48.80	-21.75
Liberal	Ron Clarke	1,737	38.90	+17.09
New Democratic	Art Dawe	353	7.91	+4.08
Independent	Gordon Dawe	196	4.39	
Total valid votes		4,465	99.71	–
Total rejected ballots		13	0.29	+0.05
Turnout		4,478	73.51	-2.25
Eligible voters		6,092		
Progressive Conservative hold		Swing		-19.42
Source: Elections Newfoundland and Labrador

1982 Newfoundland general election
Party	Candidate	Votes	%	±%
Progressive Conservative	John Butt	5,382	70.56	+24.29
Liberal	Gerald Greenslade	1,664	21.81	-12.79
New Democratic	Howard Story	292	3.83	-0.39
Independent	Jerry LeDrew	290	3.80	
Total valid votes		7,628	99.76	–
Total rejected ballots		18	0.24	–0.28
Turnout		7,646	75.76	+0.36
Eligible voters		10,093		
Progressive Conservative hold		Swing		+18.54
Source: Elections Newfoundland and Labrador

1979 Newfoundland general election
Party	Candidate	Votes	%	±%
Progressive Conservative	John Butt	3,503	46.27	+2.06
Liberal	John A. Nolan	2,620	34.61	-10.33
Independent	Gordon Dawe	1,035	13.67	
New Democratic	Boyd Batten	319	4.21	+0.10
Independent	Richard Gosse	94	1.24	
Total valid votes		7,571	99.49	–
Total rejected ballots		39	0.51	+0.04
Turnout		7,610	75.40	-3.84
Eligible voters		10,093		
Progressive Conservative gain from Liberal		Swing		+6.19
Source: Elections Newfoundland and Labrador

1975 Newfoundland general election
Party	Candidate	Votes	%
Liberal	John A. Nolan	3,112	44.93
Progressive Conservative	Gordon Dawe	3,062	44.21
Reform Liberal	Ralph C. Petten	467	6.74
New Democratic	Wilson Porter	285	4.11
Total valid votes		6,926	99.53
Total rejected ballots		33	0.47
Turnout		6,959	79.24
Eligible voters		8,782	
Source: Elections Newfoundland and Labrador

== See also ==
- List of Newfoundland and Labrador provincial electoral districts
- Canadian provincial electoral districts
