= Rex Hillier =

Canadian politician

Member of the Newfoundland and Labrador House of Assembly for Conception Bay South
- In office November 21, 2014 – November 27, 2015
- Preceded by: Terry French
- Succeeded by: District Abolished

Personal details
- Party: Liberal Party

Rex Hillier is a Canadian politician. He was elected to represent the district of Conception Bay South in the Newfoundland and Labrador House of Assembly in a 2014 by-election. He is a member of the Liberal Party. Before being elected, Hiller was a member of the Conception Bay South Town Council as a Councillor. He was the Liberal nominee in the district of Topsail-Paradise for the 2015 provincial election but lost to Paul Davis. He had previously lost the Liberal nomination in Conception Bay South for the 2015 election.

== Election results ==
2015 Newfoundland and Labrador general election
Party	Candidate	Votes	%	±%
Progressive Conservative	Paul Davis	3,381	58.3	–
Liberal	Rex Hillier	2,137	36.9	–
New Democratic	Chris Bruce	281	4.8	–

}

Conception Bay South By-election November 5, 2014 On the resignation of Terry French, September 18, 2014
Party	Candidate	Votes	%	±%
Liberal	Rex Hillier	2102	49.37	+42.63
Progressive Conservative	Barry Petten	2034	47.58	-21.61
NDP	Cameron Mercer-Maillet	130	3.05	-21.01
Total valid votes		4258		
Rejected				
Turnout				
Liberal gain		Swing		
