= Derrick Dalley =

Canadian politician (born 1965)

The Honourable Derrick Dalley ECNL

Minister of Tourism, Culture, and Recreation, And Minister of Fisheries and Aquaculture
- In office October 28, 2011 – October 9, 2013
- Preceded by: Terry French
- Succeeded by: Terry French

Minister of Business
- In office January 13, 2011 – October 28, 2011
- Preceded by: Ross Wiseman
- Succeeded by: Darin King

Member of the Newfoundland and Labrador House of Assembly for The Isles of Notre Dame
- In office 1 November 2007 – 30 November 2015
- Preceded by: Gerry Reid
- Succeeded by: District Abolished

Personal details
- Born: 22 July 1965 (age 61) Twillingate, Newfoundland and Labrador
- Party: Progressive Conservative
- Spouse: Anne Marie
- Children: Zachary, Samantha
- Occupation: Social Worker, Guidance Counselor, principal

Derrick Dalley MHA, (born 22 July 1965) is a former Canadian politician in Newfoundland and Labrador, Canada. He served as the Minister of Natural Resources in the provincial cabinet. Dalley has represented the district of The Isles of Notre Dame in the House of Assembly from 2007 until 2015. Before entering politics he worked as a guidance counselor and principal.

== Early life ==
Dalley was born in Twillingate, Notre Dame Bay. He spent his early years in Springdale before returning to Twillingate, where he completed high school. Dalley went on to attend Memorial University of Newfoundland where he completed a Bachelor of Arts degree, with a major in political science, and a Bachelor of Education degree in 1987. In 1992, he completed a master's degree in Guidance and Counseling at the University of New Brunswick. Dalley started his career as a social worker in Twillingate, before becoming a guidance counsellor for several schools on the Baie Verte Peninsula. Dalley eventually moved back to his hometown where he continued his career in education. He became principal of Inter Island Academy of New World Island and guidance counsellor and principal of J. M. Olds Academy of Twillingate.

In 1988, Dalley was named the Newfoundland Senior Hockey Leagues rookie of the year. He also plays softball and has coached and taught hockey to youth.

== Politics ==
=== Government backbencher ===
Dalley ran as the Progressive Conservative Party candidate in the 2003 provincial election in the district of Twillingate and Fogo, against Liberal cabinet minister Gerry Reid. Dalley received 44 per cent of the popular vote but was defeated by Reid by roughly 600 votes.

The district was renamed The Isles of Notre Dame for the 2007 provincial election and Dalley once again challenged Reid, who now served as the leader of the Liberal Party. On election night Dalley was declared the winner by just seven votes, in the two person race. Due to Dalley winning by less than 10 votes a judicial recount was required. In November Dalley's win was reaffirmed, with a judge declaring that he had actually defeated Reid by 12 votes. Reid had been the MHA for the district since it was created in 1996. Prior to its creation the area was made up of two separate district, and both of those had only elected a Progressive Conservative on one occasion.

Dalley was appointed as Vice-Chair of the Public Accounts Committee on 9 January 2008. On 9 April 2009, he was appointed Parliamentary Secretary to the Minister of Education, replacing Darin King who was sworn in as Minister of Education.

=== Minister of Business ===
On 13 January 2011, Premier Kathy Dunderdale appointed Dalley to cabinet as the Minister of Business. Dalley's first major announcement as minister was a $500,000 loan to help establish a shrimp shell processing facility within his district. Following this announcement, both oppositions parties criticized Dalley's appointment to cabinet. New Democratic Party leader Lorraine Michael said his appointment was in part because of his narrow victory in the 2007 election. Kelvin Parsons, who was the acting Official Opposition Leader, said the announcement showed Dalley was in trouble in his district and that he was appointed to cabinet to help him in the upcoming election. In the October 11, 2011, provincial election Dalley was easily re-elected, winning 68 per cent of the popular vote.

=== Minister of Tourism, Culture and Recreation ===
The Department of Business was merged with the Department of Innovation, Trade and Rural Development following the provincial election and Dalley was appointed Minister of Tourism, Culture and Recreation. He held that portfolio for less than a year before moving to the Department of Fisheries and Aquaculture.

=== Minister of Fisheries and Aquaculture ===
In an 19 October 2012, cabinet shuffle Dalley replaced Darin King as the Minister of Fisheries and Aquaculture. At the time of Dalley's appointment the department was dealing with a proposal from Ocean Choice International (OCI) that would allow the company to ship out raw product to Europe and Asia in return for processing jobs at the fish plant in Fortune. At the time OCI had 60 seasonal employees working at the Fortune fish plant and planned to create 110 full-time processing jobs if government approved their proposal. Negotiations had been ongoing for nearly a year and at the time of the shuffle Dunderdale said she was unsure if government would reach a deal with OCI. On 21 December 2012, Dalley held a news conference to announce that a deal had been struck with OCI. The deal would create 236 year-round jobs, between the town's plant and on company vessels at sea, for a minimum of five years. In return the company would ship up to 75 per cent of its yellowtail flounder quota overseas and 100 per cent of its redfish quota.

=== Minister of Natural Resources ===
In a cabinet shuffle held on 9 October 2013, Dalley was promoted to the Department of Natural Resources. The following day Dalley, along with Premier Dunderdale and executives from Husky Energy, were in Placentia to announce a multibillion-dollar development in the offshore oil industry. The announcement was on the White Rose Extension Project, which would see a graving dock facility complete with gates built in Argentia.

Dalley's district was abolished in 2015 and largely replaced by Lewisporte-Twillingate. Dalley ran in the new district and lost.

== Electoral record ==
2015 Newfoundland and Labrador general election
Party	Candidate	Votes	%	±%
Liberal	Derek Bennett	3,254	53.9	–
Progressive Conservative	Derrick Dalley	2,686	44.5	–
New Democratic	Hillary Bushell	99	1.6	–

=== Results as The Isles of Notre Dame ===
2011 Newfoundland and Labrador general election
Party	Candidate	Votes	%	±%
Progressive Conservative	Derrick Dalley	2,764	67.65%	–
Liberal	Danny Dumaresque	1,070	26.19%	
NDP	Tree Walsh	252	6.17%	

2007 Newfoundland and Labrador general election
Party	Candidate	Votes	%	±%
Progressive Conservative	Derrick Dalley	2371	50.07%	+5.82
Liberal	Gerry Reid	2364	49.93%	-5.82

=== Results as Twillingate and Fogo ===
2003 Newfoundland and Labrador general election
Party	Candidate	Votes	%	±%
Liberal	Gerry Reid	2941	55.75	-10.07
Progressive Conservative	Derrick Dalley	2344	44.25	+15.39

Newfoundland and Labrador provincial government of Paul Davis
Cabinet post (1)
Predecessor	Office	Successor
Continued from Marshall Ministry	Minister of Natural Resources; 26 September 2014 – 14 December 2015	Siobhan Coady

Newfoundland and Labrador provincial government of Tom Marshall
Cabinet post (1)
Predecessor	Office	Successor
Continued from Dunderdale Ministry	Minister of Natural Resources; 24 January 2014 – 26 September 2014	Continued into Davis Ministry

Newfoundland and Labrador provincial government of Kathy Dunderdale
Cabinet posts (4)
Predecessor	Office	Successor
Tom Marshall	Minister of Natural Resources; 9 October 2013 – 24 January 2014	Continued into Marshall Ministry
Darin King	Minister of Fisheries and Aquaculture; 19 October 2012 – 9 October 2013	Keith Hutchings
Terry French	Minister of Tourism, Culture and Recreation; 28 October 2011 – 19 October 2012	Terry French
Ross Wiseman	Minister of Business; 13 January 2011 – 28 October 2011	Department Abolished
