= St. John's West (provincial electoral district) =

Provincial electoral district in Newfoundland and Labrador, Canada

Newfoundland and Labrador electoral district
- Location in the St. John's area

Provincial electoral district
- Legislature: Newfoundland and Labrador House of Assembly
MHA
Keith White
Liberal
- District created: 1949
- First contested: 1949
- Last contested: 2025

Demographics
- Population (2006): 11,805
- Electors (2011): 7,741
- Area (km²): 10
- Census division: Division No. 1
- Census subdivision: St. John's

St. John's West is a provincial electoral district for the House of Assembly of Newfoundland and Labrador, Canada. In 2011, there were 7,741 eligible voters living within the district.

The district is largely residential and middle class and includes the Cowan Heights area. Prior to 1956, the district was larger and elected two MHAs.

The district is represented by Keith White. It was previously held by Cabinet Minister Siobhan Coady.

From 1949 to 1975, it elected two MHAs through block voting. Since 1975, it has elected a single MHA through first past the post.

== Members of the House of Assembly ==
The following members of the House of Assembly have been elected in St. John's West:

Assembly	Years	Member	Party
29th	1949–1951	James Spratt	Liberal
29th	1949–1951	Oliver Vardy	Liberal
30th	1949–1951	Oliver Vardy	Liberal
30th	1951–1956	Peter Cashin	Progressive Conservative
30th	1951–1956	Malcolm Hollett	Progressive Conservative
31st	1956–1959	Malcolm Hollett	Progressive Conservative
32nd	1959–1962	Joseph R. Smallwood	Liberal
33rd	1962–1966	William G. Adams	Liberal
34th	1966–1969	John Crosbie	Liberal
34th	1969–1971	John Crosbie	Progressive Conservative
35th	1972	John Crosbie	Progressive Conservative
36th	1972–1975	John Crosbie	Progressive Conservative
37th	1975–1977	John Crosbie	Progressive Conservative
37th	1977–1979	Hubert Kitchen	Liberal
38th	1979–1982	Hal Barrett	Progressive Conservative
39th	1982–1985	Hal Barrett	Progressive Conservative
40th	1985–1989	Hal Barrett	Progressive Conservative
41st	1989–1993	Rex Gibbons	Liberal
42nd	1993–1996	Rex Gibbons	Liberal
43rd	1996–1997	Rex Gibbons	Liberal
43rd	1997–1999	Sheila Osborne	Progressive Conservative
44th	1999–2003	Sheila Osborne	Progressive Conservative
45th	2003–2007	Sheila Osborne	Progressive Conservative
46th	2007–2011	Sheila Osborne	Progressive Conservative
47th	2011–2015	Dan Crummell	Progressive Conservative
48th	2015–2019	Siobhán Coady	Liberal
49th	2019–2021	Siobhán Coady	Liberal
50th	2021–2025	Siobhán Coady	Liberal
51st	2025–present	Keith White	Liberal

== Election results ==
Graph of election results (minor parties that never got 2% of the vote or did not run consistently are omitted) View source data.

2025 Newfoundland and Labrador general election
Party	Candidate	Votes	%	±%
Liberal	Keith White	2,354	53.77	-4.06
Progressive Conservative	Kristina Ennis	1,472	33.62	+1.59
New Democratic	Marius Normore	552	12.61	+2.46
Total valid votes		4,378	99.43	
Total rejected ballots		25	0.05	
Turnout		4,403	44.91	
Eligible voters		9,803		
Liberal hold		Swing		-2.82

2021 Newfoundland and Labrador general election
Party	Candidate	Votes	%	±%
Liberal	Siobhán Coady	2,679	57.82	+12.13
Progressive Conservative	Kristina Ennis	1,484	32.03	-10.19
New Democratic	Brenda Walsh	470	10.14	-1.94
Total valid votes		4,633	99.08	
Total rejected ballots		43	0.92	
Turnout		4,676	49.14	
Eligible voters		9,516		
Liberal hold		Swing		+11.16
Source(s) "Officially Nominated Candidates General Election 2021" (PDF). Elections Newfoundland and Labrador. "NL Election 2021 (Unofficial Results)".

2019 Newfoundland and Labrador general election
Party	Candidate	Votes	%	±%
Liberal	Siobhán Coady	2,393	45.69	-0.32
Progressive Conservative	Shane Skinner	2,211	42.22	+15.42
New Democratic	Brenda Walsh	633	12.09	-15.10
Total valid votes		5,237	99.37	
Total rejected ballots		33	0.63	+0.18
Turnout		5,270	57.31	+1.73
Electors on the lists		9,195	–	
Liberal hold		Swing		-7.87
Source: Elections Newfoundland & Labrador

2015 Newfoundland and Labrador general election
Party	Candidate	Votes	%	±%
Liberal	Siobhán Coady	2,342	46.01	+26.76
New Democratic	Earle McCurdy	1,384	27.19	-10.21
Progressive Conservative	Dan Crummell	1,364	26.80	-16.55
Total valid votes		5,090	99.55	
Total rejected ballots		23	0.45	+0.23
Turnout		5,113	55.59	-4.01
Eligible voters		9,198		
Liberal gain from Progressive Conservative		Swing		+21.66
Source: Elections Newfoundland and Labrador

2011 Newfoundland and Labrador general election
Party	Candidate	Votes	%	±%
Progressive Conservative	Dan Crummell	2,004	43.35	-29.33
New Democratic	Chris Pickard	1,729	37.40	+30.50
Liberal	George Joyce	890	19.25	-1.17
Total valid votes		4,623	99.78	
Total rejected ballots		10	0.22	
Turnout		4,633	59.60	
Eligible voters		7,774		

2007 Newfoundland and Labrador general election
Party	Candidate	Votes	%	±%
Progressive Conservative	Sheila Osborne	3,623	72.68	-0.47
Liberal	George Joyce	1,018	20.42	-0.08
New Democratic	Joan Scott	344	6.90	-0.39

2003 Newfoundland and Labrador general election
Party	Candidate	Votes	%	±%
Progressive Conservative	Sheila Osborne	4,557	72.21	–
Liberal	Tom Hann	1,294	20.50	
NDP	Raj Sharan	460	7.29	

1999 Newfoundland general election
Party	Candidate	Votes	%	±%
Progressive Conservative	Sheila Osborne	3,206	49.8	–
Liberal	Tom Moore	2,532	39.3	
NDP	Pat Lynch	683	10.6	

1996 Newfoundland general election
Party	Candidate	Votes	%	±%
Liberal	Rex Gibbons	4,152		
Progressive Conservative	Bren Kelly	1,648	–	–
NDP	Pat Lynch	651		

1993 Newfoundland general election
Party	Candidate	Votes	%	±%
Liberal	Rex Gibbons	3,094		
Progressive Conservative	Paul Sears	2,485	–	–
NDP	Bonnie MacGillivray	835		

1989 Newfoundland general election
Party	Candidate	Votes	%	±%
Liberal	Rex Gibbons	3,389		
Progressive Conservative	Hal Barrett	2,583	–	–
NDP	Larry Power	380		

1985 Newfoundland general election
Party	Candidate	Votes	%	±%
Progressive Conservative	Harold Barrett	3,382	–	–
Liberal	Gerald Moore	1,595		
NDP	Thomas O'Leary	1,508		

1982 Newfoundland general election
Party	Candidate	Votes	%	±%
Progressive Conservative	Harold Barrett	2,475	–	–
Liberal	Ronald Pumphrey	755		
NDP	Ronald Lewis	225		

== See also ==
- List of Newfoundland and Labrador provincial electoral districts
- Canadian provincial electoral districts
