= Siobhán Coady =

Canadian businesswoman and politician (born 1960)

The Honourable Siobhán Coady ECNL
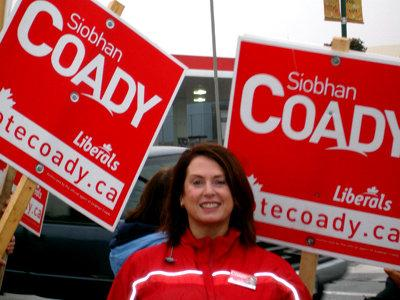

Member of the Newfoundland and Labrador House of Assembly for St. John's West
- In office November 30, 2015 – October 14, 2025
- Preceded by: Dan Crummell
- Succeeded by: Keith White

Deputy Premier of Newfoundland and Labrador
- In office August 19, 2020 – October 29, 2025
- Premier: Andrew Furey; John Hogan
- Preceded by: Steve Kent
- Succeeded by: Barry Petten

Minister of Finance
- In office August 19, 2020 – October 29, 2025
- Preceded by: Tom Osborne
- Succeeded by: Craig Pardy

Minister of Natural Resources
- In office December 14, 2015 – August 19, 2020
- Premier: Dwight Ball
- Preceded by: Derrick Dalley
- Succeeded by: Andrew Parsons

Member of Parliament for St. John's South–Mount Pearl
- In office October 14, 2008 – May 2, 2011
- Preceded by: Loyola Hearn
- Succeeded by: Ryan Cleary

Government House Leader
- In office November 22, 2019 – August 19, 2020
- Preceded by: Andrew Parsons
- Succeeded by: Steve Crocker

Personal details
- Born: November 11, 1960 (age 65) Grand Falls-Windsor, Newfoundland and Labrador, Canada
- Party: Liberal
- Other political affiliations: Liberal Party of Canada
- Education: Memorial University of Newfoundland
- Occupation: businesswoman

Siobhán Coady (/ʃəˈvɔːn/; born November 11, 1960) is a Canadian businesswoman and politician who represented the riding of St. John's West in the Newfoundland and Labrador House of Assembly as a Liberal, from 2015 to 2025. Coady previously served as the Liberal Member of Parliament for the riding of St. John's South–Mount Pearl from 2008 to 2011. She served as Minister of Natural Resources in the Ball government. She also served as Minister of Finance and Deputy Premier in the Furey and Hogan governments.

== Personal life ==
Coady was born in Grand Falls-Windsor and raised in St. John's. She is an alumna of Memorial University of Newfoundland having received a Bachelor of Education degree. She is also an accredited public relations professional. Coady and her husband Pat live in St. John's.

Before entering politics, Coady was president and CEO of Newfound Genomics Inc., a biotechnology company; The Clinical Trials Centre, a medical research company; and Bonaventure Fisheries Inc., a privately held fish harvesting company. She is a past chair and Governor of the Canadian Chamber of Commerce and was President of the St. John’s Board of Trade in 1993.

Coady has volunteered in a wide range of activities with community organizations including as Past Chair of the Regional Economic Development Board, the Newfoundland and Labrador Business Hall of Fame, and the Red Cross Campaign. Until her election to Parliament, Coady was a member of the board of directors for the Genesis Centre, the Children’s Wish Foundation, Genome Canada, the Public Policy Forum, the St. John’s International Airport Authority, and was the public representative on the Institute of Chartered Accountants of Newfoundland.

== Federal politics ==
Coady ran as the Liberal Party of Canada candidate in the riding of St. John's South-Mount Pearl in the 2004 and 2006 federal elections, losing to Conservative Party incumbent Loyola Hearn.

With the retirement of Hearn, Coady ran for Parliament again in the 2008 federal election, defeating her nearest rival, New Democratic Party candidate Ryan Cleary, by a 3% margin.

After the 2008 election, Liberal Party leader, Stéphane Dion appointed Coady to the Official Opposition Shadow Cabinet as Critic for the Department of Fisheries and Oceans. In 2009, Liberal Leader, Michael Ignatieff appointed Coady as the Liberal Critic for the Treasury Board.

Coady has been on several committees including the Standing Committee on Government Operations and Estimates (OGGO) and was a member of the Standing Committee on Industry, Science, and Technology (INDU).

While Coady was considered by many to be a rising star within the Liberal caucus, and led in an opinion poll before the election, she lost her seat in the May 2, 2011, election to New Democratic Party candidate Ryan Cleary by 7,750 votes.

Following her election defeat it was reported that Coady was being lobbied by members of the Liberal Party to run for the party's presidency in January 2012, after Alfred Apps announced he would not run for re-election. In July 2011, Coady announced that she would consider being a candidate in the election to be President of the Liberal Party. Her announcement came just after former Deputy Prime Minister Sheila Copps announced that she was also considering being a candidate for president. However, Coady did not end up entering the race for the presidency.

At the Liberal Party's caucus retreat at the end of August 2011, she spoke about her desire to establish a policy think tank, similar to the Broadbent Institute and the Manning Centre for Building Democracy that had been established by New Democrats and Conservatives respectively. The think tank would look at the various ideals and principles that the Liberal Party had brought to the country and investigate their vision for the country. The institute would study, analyze and find policy suggestions to questions such as how to best ensure a quality health care system in the future, as well as how to ensure innovation, productivity and job growth.

== Provincial politics ==
In August 2011, following resignation of Yvonne Jones as Leader of the Liberal Party of Newfoundland and Labrador, Coady's name was brought up as a possible successor. While she stated early on she would not seek the leadership she continued to be lobbied by supporters to enter the race and was considered a frontrunner for the position.

In June 2014, Coady was nominated as the provincial Liberal candidate for St. John's West in the 2015 election. On November 30, 2015, Coady won the seat, defeating New Democrat leader Earle McCurdy and Progressive Conservative incumbent Dan Crummell.

In December 2015, Coady was appointed Minister of Natural Resources in the cabinet appointed by Dwight Ball. She was re-elected in the 2019 provincial election. She was sworn is as Government House Leader on October 30, 2019. On August 19, 2020, she was appointed Deputy Premier and Minister of Finance in the Furey government.

She was re-elected in the 2021 provincial election.

On July 7, 2025, Coady announced that she would not seek re-election in the 2025 provincial election.

== Electoral history ==
2021 Newfoundland and Labrador general election: St. John's West
Party	Candidate	Votes	%	±%
Liberal	Siobhán Coady	2,679	57.82	+12.13
Progressive Conservative	Kristina Ennis	1,484	32.03	-10.19
New Democratic	Brenda Walsh	470	10.14	-1.94
Total valid votes		4,633	99.08	
Total rejected ballots		43	0.92	
Turnout		4,676	49.14	
Eligible voters		9,516		
Liberal hold		Swing		+11.16
Source(s) "Officially Nominated Candidates General Election 2021" (PDF). Elections Newfoundland and Labrador. "NL Election 2021 (Unofficial Results)".

2019 Newfoundland and Labrador general election
Party	Candidate	Votes	%
Liberal	Siobhan Coady	2,393	45.7
Progressive Conservative	Shane Skinner	2,211	42.2
New Democratic	Brenda Walsh	633	12.1
Total valid votes			
Total rejected ballots			
Turnout			
Electors on the lists			–
Source: Elections Newfoundland & Labrador

St. John's West – 2015 Newfoundland and Labrador general election
Party	Candidate	Votes	%	±%
Liberal	Siobhán Coady	2,342	46.0	
New Democratic	Earle McCurdy	1,384	27.2	
Progressive Conservative	Dan Crummell	1,364	26.8	

2011 Canadian federal election: St. John's South—Mount Pearl
Party	Candidate	Votes	%	±%	Expenditures
New Democratic	Ryan Cleary	18,681	47.92	+7.36	$67,211.17
Liberal	Siobhán Coady	11,130	28.55	-14.77	$81,760.42
Conservative	Loyola Sullivan	8,883	22.79	+10.24	$78,347.37
Green	Rick Austin	291	0.75	-1.11	none listed
Total valid votes/expense limit		38,985	100.0	–	$82,628.65
Total rejected, declined and unmarked ballots		108	0.28	+0.01	
Turnout		39,093	58.97	+7.02	
Eligible voters		66,294			
New Democratic gain from Liberal		Swing		+11.06	

2008 Canadian federal election: St. John's South—Mount Pearl
Party	Candidate	Votes	%	±%	Expenditures
Liberal	Siobhán Coady	14,920	43.32	+10.32	$63,155.64
New Democratic	Ryan Cleary	13,971	40.56	+18.87	$18,947.03
Conservative	Merv Wiseman	4,324	12.55	-32.13	$63,115.88
Green	Ted Warren	643	1.86	+1.23	$172.03
Newfoundland and Labrador First	Greg Byrne	402	1.16	–	$2,908.17
Independent	Terry Christopher Butler	179	0.51	–	none listed
Total valid votes/expense limit		34,439	100.0	–	$80,167
Total rejected, declined and unmarked ballots		92	0.27	-0.06	
Turnout		34,531	51.95		
Eligible voters		66,467			
Liberal gain from Conservative		Swing		-4.28	

2006 Canadian federal election: St. John's South—Mount Pearl
Party	Candidate	Votes	%	±%	Expenditures
Conservative	Loyola Hearn	16,644	44.68	+5.11	$67,639.04
Liberal	Siobhán Coady	12,295	33.00	-2.26	$68,791.05
New Democratic	Peg Norman	8,079	21.69	-2.02	$40,492.63
Green	Barry Crozier	235	0.63	-0.83	none listed
Total valid votes/expense limit		37,253	100.0	–	$73,776
Total rejected, declined and unmarked ballots		124	0.33	+0.03	
Turnout		37,371	57.90	+5.42	
Eligible voters		64,543			
Conservative hold		Swing		+3.68	

2004 Canadian federal election: St. John's South—Mount Pearl
Party	Candidate	Votes	%	±%	Expenditures
Conservative	Loyola Hearn	13,330	39.57	-16.27	$63,090.26
Liberal	Siobhán Coady	11,879	35.26	+4.91	$63,121.27
New Democratic	Peg Norman	7989	23.71	+10.31	$36,839.75
Green	Steve Willcott	493	1.46	–	$184.24
Total valid votes/expense limit		33,691	100.0	–	$72,104
Total rejected, declined and unmarked ballots		103	0.30		
Turnout		33,794	52.48	-1.38	
Eligible voters		64,397			
Conservative notional gain from Progressive Conservative		Swing		-10.59	
Changes from 2000 are based on redistributed results. Change for the Conservatives is based on the combined totals of the Progressive Conservatives and the Canadian Alliance.
