= Dan Crummell =

Canadian politician

The Honourable Dan Crummell ECNL

Minister of Environment and Conservation, Minister of Service NL, Minister responsible for Climate change and Energy Efficiency, And Minister Responsible for the Multi-Materials Stewardship Board
- In office September 30, 2014 – December 14, 2015
- Preceded by: Vaughn Granter
- Succeeded by: Perry Trimper

Member of the Newfoundland and Labrador House of Assembly for St. John's West
- In office October 27, 2011 – November 5, 2015
- Preceded by: Sheila Osborne
- Succeeded by: Siobhán Coady

Minister of Service NL, Minister of Municipal and Intergovernmental Affairs, Minister Responsible for Fire and Emergency services-NL, Minister Responsible for the Government purchasing Agency, Minister Responsible for the Labour relations agency, Minister Responsible for the office of the chief information officer, Minister Responsible for the Workplace Health, Safety and Compensation Commission, And Registrar General
- In office October 9, 2013 – July 17, 2014
- Preceded by: Nick McGrath
- Succeeded by: David Brazil

Personal details
- Born: Gander, Newfoundland
- Party: Progressive Conservative
- Spouse: Valerie Thomson

Dan Crummell is a Canadian politician in Newfoundland and Labrador, who represented the district of St. John's West in Newfoundland and Labrador House of Assembly from 2011 to 2015, as a member of the Progressive Conservative Party. In a 1995 by-election and the 1996 provincial election, Crummell was the Progressive Conservative candidate in the district of Gander.

== Background ==
Crummell was raised in the town of Gander in central Newfoundland. He moved to St. John's to pursue his post-secondary education at Memorial University of Newfoundland (MUN), and completed an Arts degree with a major in Political Science and minors in English and History. During his time at MUN, Crummell served as the Executive Vice-President and later President of Memorial University's Council of the Students’ Union. Following his graduation he worked in sales and marketing with Molson Canada. He spent 25 years with the company, and spent 10 years as the Regional Sales Manager for Newfoundland and Labrador.

== Politics ==
Crummell first sought political office when he ran as the Progressive Conservative Party (PC) candidate in an October 10, 1995 by-election in the district of Gander. The by-election was called following the resignation of Liberal cabinet minister Winston Baker, who had held the seat since 1985. PC Party leader Lynn Verge admitted that it would be a tremendous upset if her party was able to take the seat from the Liberals in the by-election. On election night Liberal candidate Gary Vey defeated Crummell by just 46 votes. A provincial election was called only months later for February 22, 1996, and Crummell once again ran as the candidate for the PC Party in Gander. Gander mayor Sandra Kelly, who lost the Liberal nomination to Vey for the October by-election, was now the Liberal candidate for the district. Kelly defeated Crummell by over 700 votes, and the Liberal Party were re-elected to a majority government.

=== Government backbencher ===
On July 18, 2011, Crummell defeated Glenn Moores to become the Progressive Conservative candidate in the district of St. John's West, for that year's provincial election. In the October 11, election Crummell defeated New Democratic Party candidate Chris Pickard by less than 300 votes, while the Liberal candidate finished a distant third. On October 24, 2012, Crummell was appointed Parliamentary Secretary to the Minister of Advanced Education and Skills (Apprenticeship and Labour Market).

In a November 2012, radio interview Crummell stated that he thought federal Intergovernmental Affairs minister Peter Penashue should do the honourable thing and resign from cabinet. Penashue, Newfoundland and Labrador's representative in the federal cabinet, was facing allegations of improper campaign spending and donations. Hours after Crummell made the comments on CBC's radio program On Point, he sent out an email saying that he was unaware that an official agent had been appointed to look into the issues with Penashue and that he thought it was important for the province to have representation in the federal cabinet. Five months later Penashue resigned as minister of Intergovernmental Affairs and as the member of Parliament for Labrador, and announced he would run in a by-election after it was confirmed he had accepted ineligible donations in the 2011 election. He was later defeated in a by-election.

=== Cabinet Minister ===
On October 9, 2013, Premier Kathy Dunderdale appointed Crummell Minister of Service NL, in a major shuffle that saw him and MHA Steve Kent enter cabinet. Along with being named Minister of Service NL, Crummell was also Minister Responsible for the Workplace Health, Safety and Compensation Commission, Minister Responsible for the Office of the Chief Information Officer, and Minister Responsible for the Government Purchasing Agency.

On July 17, 2014, Crummell was appointed Minister of Municipal and Intergovernmental Affairs, Minister Responsible for Fire and Emergency Services, and Registrar General.

On September 30, 2014, Crummell was appointed Minister of Environment and Conservation, Minister Responsible for the Multi-Materials Stewardship Board and Minister Responsible for Climate Change and Energy Efficiency.

In the 2015 election, Crummell was defeated by Liberal Siobhán Coady.

=== 2015-present ===
In 2018, following the election of Ches Crosbie as PC Leader; Crosbie appointed Crummell as his chief of staff in the Opposition Office. Crummell was replaced as chief of staff by former MP Bill Matthews that October.

== Electoral record ==
St. John's West - 2015 Newfoundland and Labrador general election
Party	Candidate	Votes	%	±%
Liberal	Siobhán Coady	2,342	46.0	
New Democratic	Earle McCurdy	1,384	27.2	
Progressive Conservative	Dan Crummell	1,364	26.8	

St. John's West - 2011 Newfoundland and Labrador general election
Party	Candidate	Votes	%	±%
Progressive Conservative	Dan Crummell	2,004	43.45	
NDP	Chris Pickard	1,729	37.4	
Liberal	George Joyce	890	19.25	

}

Gander - 1996 Newfoundland and Labrador general election
Party	Candidate	Votes	%	±%
Liberal	Sandra Kelly	3,585	55.8	+8.0
Progressive Conservative	Dan Crummell	2,840	44.2%	-2.7

}

Gander By-Election - October 10, 1995 On the resignation of Winston Baker, July 31, 1995
Party	Candidate	Votes	%	±%
Liberal	Gary Vey	2,421	47.8%	
Progressive Conservative	Dan Crummell	2,375	46.9%	
NDP	Roy Locke	268	5.3%	
