= Terry French (politician) =

Canadian politician

The Honourable Terry French ECNL
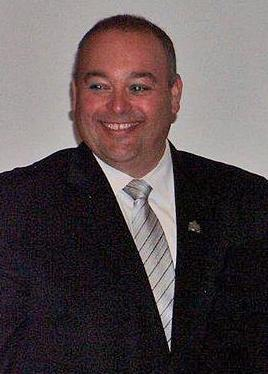

Mayor of Conception Bay South
- In office 2017–2021
- Preceded by: Steve Tessier
- Succeeded by: Darrin Bent

Minister of Tourism, Culture and Recreation, Minister of Innovation, Business, and Rural Development, Minister of Justice, And Minister Responsible for the Research and Development Corporation of Newfoundland and Labrador
- In office October 19, 2012 – September 19, 2014
- Preceded by: Derrick Dalley
- In office November 27, 2009 – October 28, 2011
- Preceded by: Clyde Jackman
- Succeeded by: Derrick Dalley

Member of the Newfoundland and Labrador House of Assembly for Conception Bay South
- In office 2002 – September 19, 2014
- Preceded by: Bob French
- Succeeded by: Rex Hillier

Minister of Environment and Conservation, Minister Responsible for the Labour relations Agency, Minister Responsible for the multi-materials stewardship board, And Minister Responsible for the Office of Climate change, Energy Efficiency and Emissions training of Newfoundland and Labrador
- In office October 28, 2011 – October 19, 2012
- Preceded by: Ross Wiseman
- Succeeded by: Tom Hedderson

Personal details
- Born: Conception Bay South, Newfoundland and Labrador, Canada
- Party: Progressive Conservative
- Occupation: Executive Assistant

Terry French is a Canadian politician in Newfoundland and Labrador, Canada. French represented the district of Conception Bay South in the Newfoundland and Labrador House of Assembly from 2002 to 2014. He was acclaimed as mayor of Conception Bay South in the 2017 Newfoundland and Labrador municipal elections.

He was first elected to the provincial assembly in a 2002 by-election held following the death of his father Bob French, who had represented the riding since 1996.

He served in the cabinets of Danny Williams, Kathy Dunderdale and Tom Marshall. He has served as the Minister of Tourism, Culture and Recreation, Minister of Environment and Conservation and as the Minister of Justice. On September 19, 2014, French resigned his Conception Bay South seat.

In 2015, he was named president of the Construction Labour Relations Association of Newfoundland and Labrador.

== Electoral record ==
Conception Bay South - 2011 Newfoundland and Labrador general election
Party	Candidate	Votes	%	±%
Progressive Conservative	Terry French	3632	69.19%	–
NDP	Noah Davis-Power	1263	24.06%	
Liberal	Cynthia Layden-Barron	354	6.74%	

Conception Bay South - 2007 Newfoundland and Labrador general election
Party	Candidate	Votes	%	±%
Progressive Conservative	Terry French	4671	79.4%	–
Liberal	Jerry Young	953	16.2%	
NDP	Touria Tougui	259	4.4%	

Conception Bay South - 2003 Newfoundland and Labrador general election
Party	Candidate	Votes	%	±%
Progressive Conservative	Terry French	5606	83.10%	–
Liberal	Andy Lewis	768	11.38%	
NDP	Sheina Lerman	372	5.51%	

}

Conception Bay South - By-Election, October 21, 2002 Due to the death of Bob French, August 2, 2002
Party	Candidate	Votes	%	±%
Progressive Conservative	Terry French	4761	82.1%	–
Liberal	Gary Corbett	950	16.4%	
NDP	Ann Price	73	1.6%	
