= Stelman Flynn =

Canadian politician

Member of the Newfoundland and Labrador House of Assembly for Humber East
- In office December 11, 2014 – November 27, 2015
- Preceded by: Tom Marshall
- Succeeded by: District Abolished

Personal details
- Born: Forteau, Newfoundland and Labrador, Canada
- Party: Liberal Party

Stelman Flynn is a Canadian politician. He was elected to represent the district of Humber East in the Newfoundland and Labrador House of Assembly in a 2014 by-election. He is a member of the Liberal Party. Before being elected, Flynn served two terms as president of Hospitality Newfoundland and Labrador, one of the province's largest industry organizations.

Flynn's riding of Humber East was abolished for the 2015 provincial election. He lost the Liberal nomination for the new riding of St. George's-Humber to fellow MHA Scott Reid. Flynn unsuccessfully ran as the Liberal candidate in Humber-Bay of Islands for the 2021 provincial election.

== Election results ==
2021 Newfoundland and Labrador general election: Humber-Bay of Islands
Party	Candidate	Votes	%	±%
Independent	Eddie Joyce	2,988	71.60	+4.41
Liberal	Stelman Flynn	741	17.76	+0.56
Progressive Conservative	Robert Marche	444	10.64	+0.03
Total valid votes		4,173	97.87	
Total rejected ballots		91	2.13	
Turnout		4,264	41.00	
Eligible voters		10,399		
Independent hold		Swing		+1.93
Source: Elections Newfoundland and Labrador

Newfoundland and Labrador provincial by-election, 25 November 2014
Party	Candidate	Votes	%	±%
Liberal	Stelman Flynn	2,263	56.13	+47.66
Progressive Conservative	Lary Wells	1,454	36.06	-42.19
New Democratic	Martin Ware	315	7.81	-5.47
Total valid votes		4,032		
Liberal gain from Progressive Conservative		Swing		+44.92
