= Pat Cowan (politician) =

Canadian politician

Patricia Anne Cowan (1943 – May 8, 2006) was a politician in Newfoundland. She represented Conception Bay South in the Newfoundland House of Assembly from 1989 to 1996 as a Liberal.

Patt Cowan was born in Ontario and moved to Newfoundland in 1974. Cowan was a primary school principal in Conception Bay South during the 1980s. She was president of the Newfoundland and Labrador Teachers' Association from 1987 to 1989.

Cowan was elected to the Newfoundland assembly in 1989. She served in the provincial cabinet as Minister of Employment and Labour Relations, Minister of Environment and Lands and Minister Responsible for the Status of Women.
