= Conception Bay South =

- Town
- Town of Conception Bay South
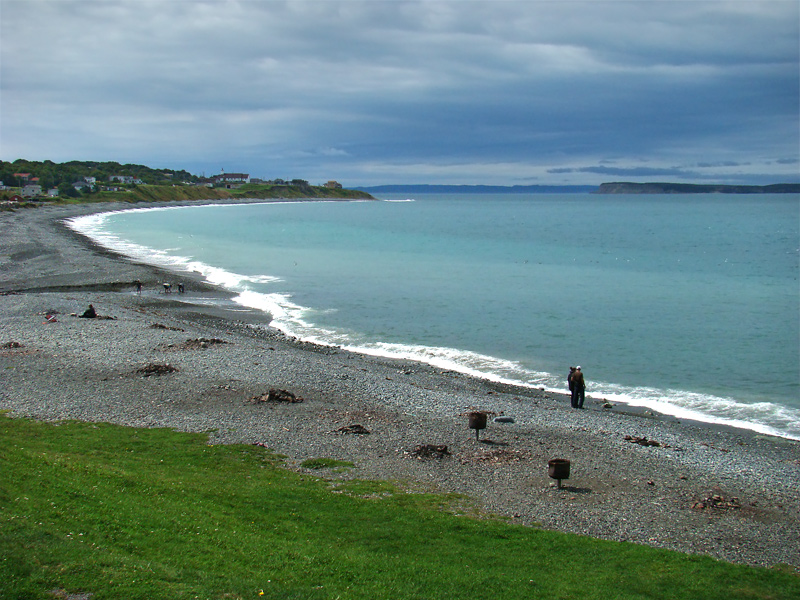
- Topsail Beach

- Seal
- Nickname: C.B.S.
- Motto: Bright town. Bright future.
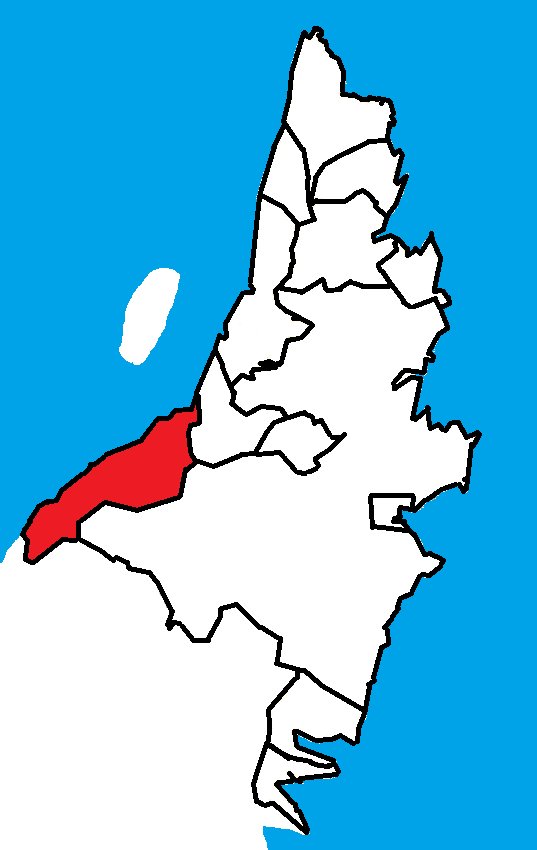
- Location of Conception Bay South (red) in the St. John's Metropolitan Area.

- Location of Conception Bay South in Newfoundland
- Coordinates: 47°31′00″N 52°59′00″W
- Country: Canada
- Province: Newfoundland and Labrador
- Incorporated: 1973

Government
  - Type: Conception Bay South Town Council
  - Mayor: Darrin Bent
  - MHA: Paul Dinn; Helen Conway-Ottenheimer; Barry Petten
  - MP: Paul Connors

Area
  - Total: 59.10 km^{2} (22.82 sq mi)
- Elevation: 14 m (46 ft)

Population (2021)
  - Total: 27,168
  - Density: 459.7/km^{2} (1,191/sq mi)
- Time zone: UTC−3:30 (Newfoundland Time)
  - Summer (DST): UTC−2:30 (Newfoundland Daylight)
- Postal code span: A1W & A1X
- Area code: 709
- Highways: Route 1 (TCH); Route 2 Route 60; Route 61

Conception Bay South is a town in the Province of Newfoundland and Labrador, Canada. The town is commonly called CBS.

The town is located on the Avalon Peninsula which forms part of the southern shore of Conception Bay which is in turn part of the island of Newfoundland. It is approximately 20 kilometres (12 miles) southwest of the provincial capital of St. John's. Conception Bay South is the second largest municipality in the province and is part of the St. John's metropolitan area, the 20th largest metropolitan area in Canada. Most of the residents are employed in the nearby cities of St. John's or Mount Pearl.

The town lies on Cambrian bedrock, primarily shale containing limestone concretions and manganese ores.

== History ==
Conception Bay South was formed in 1973 through the amalgamation of eight communities (Topsail, Chamberlains, Manuels, Long Pond, Foxtrap, Kelligrews, Upper Gullies and Seal Cove) all of which follow the coastline of Conception Bay. Lawrence Pond amalgamated with the town in 1985.

The early residents, mainly English but some Irish, were attracted by good growing land, abundant supplies of firewood and the more temperate climate as compared to other parts of the Avalon Peninsula. Good communication with St. John's was established by road in the 1830s and strengthened in the 1880s with the arrival of the railway. Residents of Conception Bay South grew crops and raised cattle for the St. John's market and St. John's residents established summer homes in Conception Bay South.

== Demographics ==
Historical population
Year	Pop.	±%
1971	8,212	—
1976	9,743	+18.6%
1981	10,856	+11.4%
1986	15,531	+43.1%
1991	17,590	+13.3%
2001	19,772	+12.4%
2006	21,966	+11.1%
2011	24,848	+13.1%
2016	26,199	+5.4%
2021	27,168	+3.7%

In the 2021 Census of Population conducted by Statistics Canada, Conception Bay South had a population of 27,168 living in 10,711 of its 11,364 total private dwellings, a change of 3.7% from its 2016 population of 26,199. With a land area of 59.72 km^{2} (23.06 sq mi), it had a population density of 454.9/km^{2} (1,178.2/sq mi) in 2021.

In 2016, Conception Bay South was 92.3% White, 6.6% Aboriginal, and 1.1% other visible minorities.

== Economy ==
Conception Bay provided ample fishing grounds for some time in its history. The world's largest tuna was caught off the coast of Long Pond and is now on display in the Atlantic Fisheries Museum in Lunenburg, Nova Scotia. Lobster trapping is also a common sight.

== Tourism ==
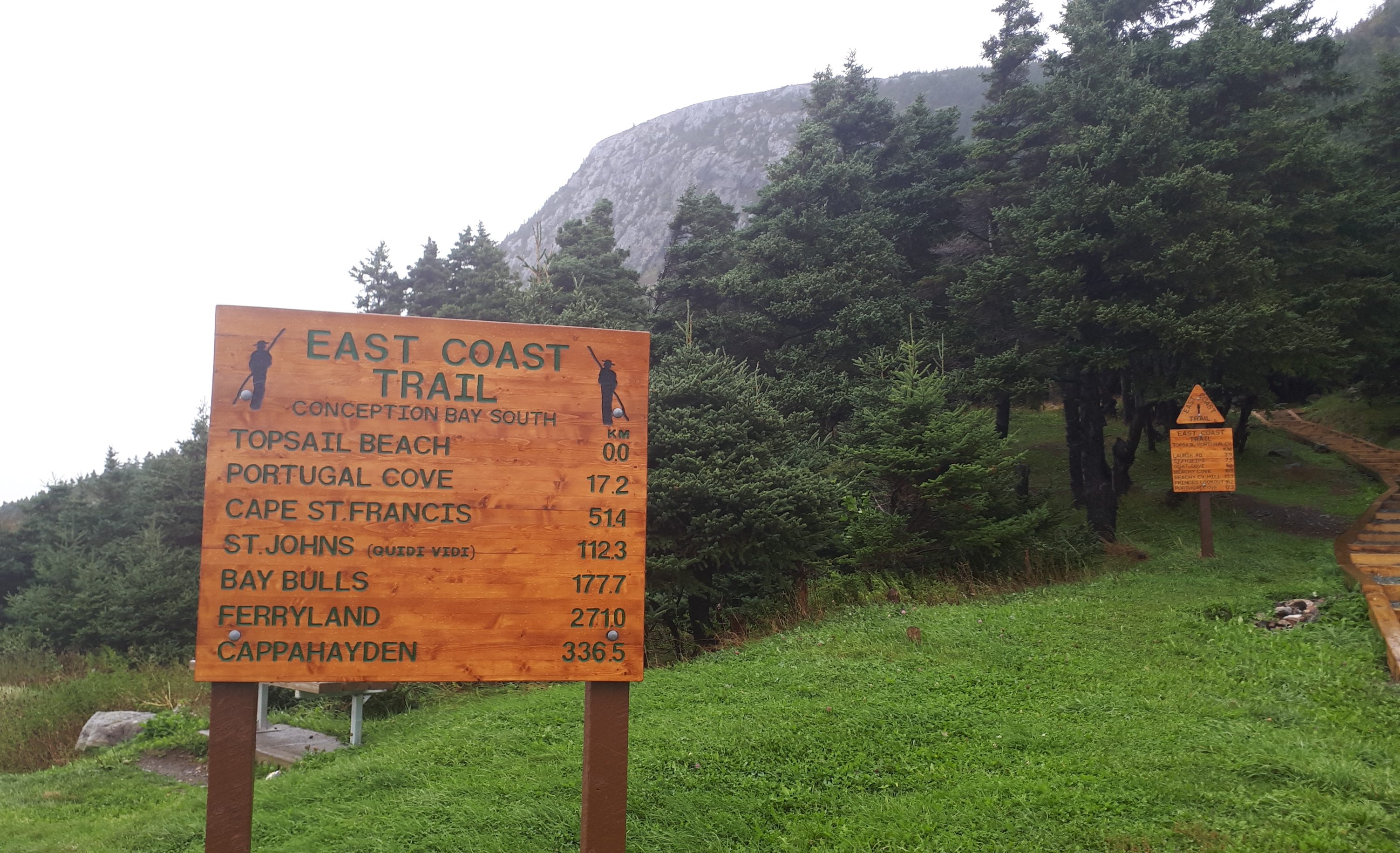
The start of the East Coast Trail at the Topsail Beach park.

The Kelligrews Soiree launches the Town's tourist season in early July. There are several full days of activities and events for the entire family, including the world-famous Kelligrews Soiree folk festival and garden party.

The Admirals' Coast scenic route follows Route 60 along the western and southern shore of Conception Bay between Marysvale to Paradise, and provides excellent views over the bay. Conception Bay South is the largest community in the Admirals' Coast and provides many amenities for tourists visiting the region.

The town is one of the few to have a geological attraction, namely the trilobite fossil beds along the Manuels River Linear Park. The fossils found here are similar to those found in southern Spain, Portugal, and northern Africa, but different from those found in western Newfoundland. This was a key in establishing the theory of plate tectonics, or continental drift.

The town also has a marina at Foxtrap, site of a famous 19th century "battle." The town is home to the Royal Newfoundland Yacht Club at Long Pond, which received permission for use of the Prefix Royal, and the Blue Ensign.

A popular seaside attraction is Topsail Beach, in the east end of town. The park at Topsail Beach is the northern beginning of the East Coast Trail.

== Education ==
Conception Bay South is home to nine schools under the Newfoundland and Labrador English School District. There are five elementary schools (Admirals Academy, Upper Gullies Elementary, St. Edward's, St. George's Elementary, and Topsail Elementary), two junior high schools (Frank Roberts Junior High, and Villanova Junior High) and two high schools (Queen Elizabeth Regional High, and Holy Spirit High). French Immersion is offered from K-12 through all of these schools. There is also the College of the North Atlantic (Seal Cove Campus).

== Sports ==
Sports are a big part of community life in Conception Bay South. Rugby and soccer are perhaps the most popular sports in the community. The town is home to the Bayman Rugby Club. The Conception Bay South Soccer Association boasts more than 1000 members playing at fields in Topsail, Chamberlains, Foxtrap and Kelligrews. The association is home to a state of the art clubhouse and turf field facility at Topsail. Conception Bay South Soccer has hosted the Under 13 Atlantic Championships twice (2012 and 2014), the Under 18 National Championships (2013) and the Under 16 National Championships (2014). In 2013 Olympic Bronze medalists Christine Sinclair, Diana Matheson, Karina LeBlanc and Rhian Wilkinson held clinics for young players at the Topsail facility. The soccer association has also hosted the 2016 Senior National Championships as well as the 2016 Newfoundland and Labrador Summer Games. The Conception Bay South Soccer Association's competitive teams are known as the "Conception Bay South Strikers."

Swimming, tennis, ice hockey, baseball, softball and volleyball are also played by many residents. Curling has been adapted by many residents who in the past have played in St. John's. There are currently 5 soccer fields, a rugby field, 25m swimming pool, 2 hockey stadiums, 6 ball fields as well as many gyms, and courts. The outdoor tennis court by Villanova Jr. High has been converted into a skatepark, with the removal of the nets and addition of 4 permanent (but movable) pieces of skatepark equipment.

There is also a large minor hockey association in Conception Bay South with over 900 Children involved aged from 5 until age 18. The children involved travel all the way from Topsail to Avondale to play in the Conception Bay Regional minor hockey association. The association is divided up into six divisions according to age: there is Pre-Novice, Novice, Atom, Peewee, Bantam, and Midget. Each division is also divided into A, B and C teams based on skill level of the people who participate in the try-outs each year. There is also an annual competition between the two high school hockey teams each year called the Fred Squires shield. This best-of-three game series is dedicated to Fred Squires who was a former Conception Bay South stadium manager and later died in an automobile accident while employed with the Canadian Red Cross, NL division.

In 2021, the Newfoundland Growlers of the ECHL played six games at CBS Arena, after a workplace misconduct investigation prevented them from playing at their regular home stadium, the Mary Brown's Centre. The team squared off against the Adirondack Thunder and the Worcester Railers for three games apiece, winning four games in total before sold-out crowds of 1,168 spectators.

== Emergency services ==
Conception Bay South is home to a 24-hour Fire Department staffed by 28 full-time and 25 volunteer members. The West Side Fire Hall is located in Kelligrews and the East Side Fire Hall is in Topsail. There is an RNC headquarters located in Manuels, and many on-call ambulance services. Search and Rescue is provided by the Canadian Forces 103 Rescue Squadron based at Gander International Airport in central Newfoundland as well as the Canadian Coast Guard from St.John's.

== Transportation ==
The town is located approximately 30 km from St. John's International Airport which provides service to Canada, the United States, the Caribbean and Europe. The town's harbour is located in the Long Pond area and hosts many cruise ships over the summer months. Parsons & Sons provides charter busing and school runs for the public throughout the town and also outside the province. There is a taxi service along with taxi companies from nearby St. John's, Mount Pearl and Paradise. There are also two marinas located in C.B.S., one in Foxtrap and one in Long Pond.

== Local government ==
2021

- Mayor: Darrin Bent
- Deputy Mayor: Andrea Gosse
- Councillors: Josh Barrett, Christine Butler, Melissa Hardy, Rex Hillier, Shelley Moores, Gerard Tilley, Paul Connors.

== Notable people ==
- Tom Dawe, writer
- Nicole Lundrigan, writer
- Lauren Rowe, soccer player
- Marit Stiles (born 1969), politician
- Nick Wall, jockey
