= 45th General Assembly of Newfoundland and Labrador =

45th General Assembly of Newfoundland
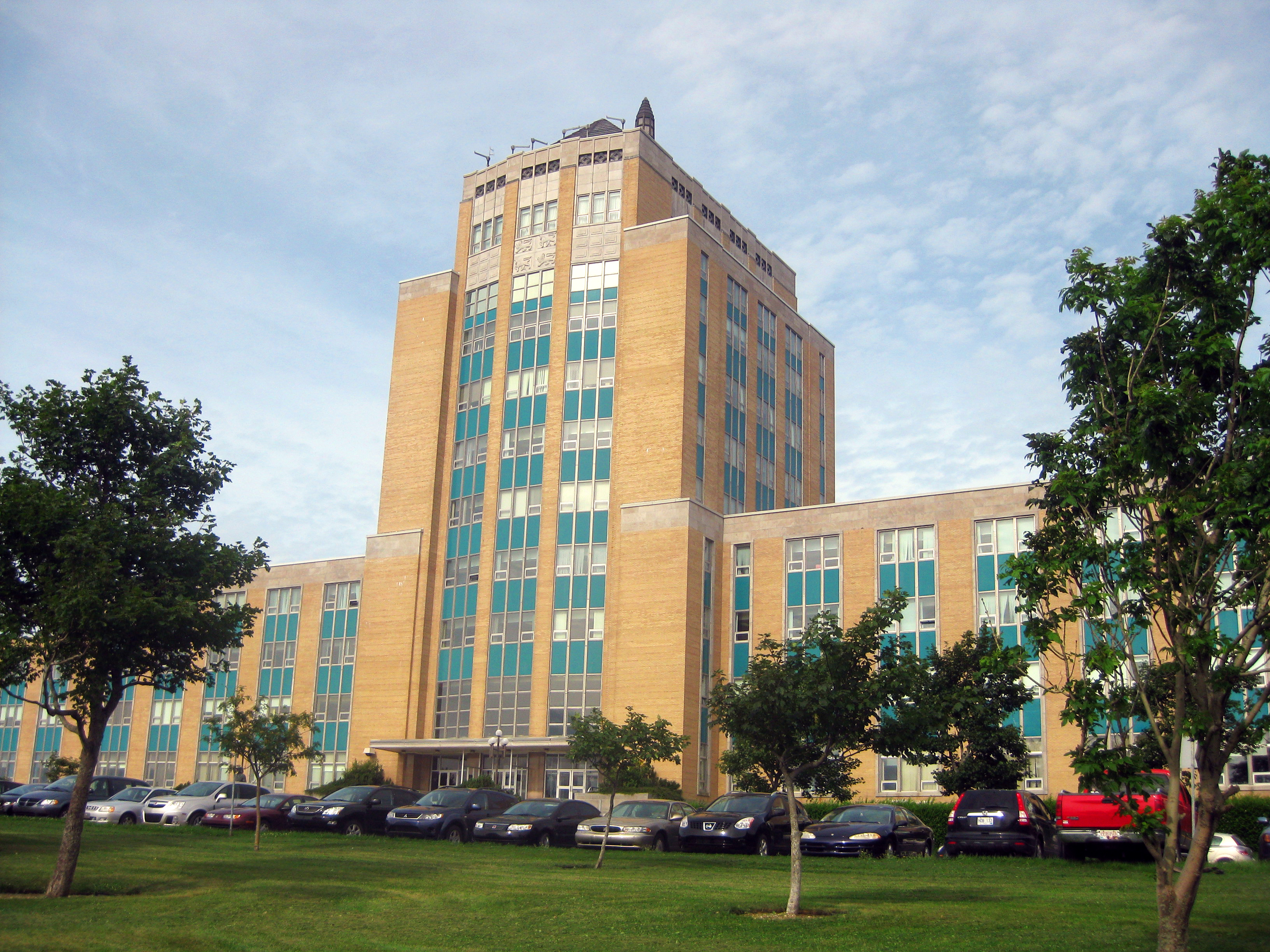
- Confederation Building East Block. Seat of the Newfoundland and Labrador government and the House of Assembly from 1960 to present.

History
- Founded: 2003
- Disbanded: 2007
- Preceded by: 44th General Assembly of Newfoundland and Labrador
- Succeeded by: 46th General Assembly of Newfoundland and Labrador

Leadership
- Premier: Danny Williams

Elections
- Last election: 2003 Newfoundland and Labrador general election

The 45th Newfoundland and Labrador House of Assembly began on November 12, 2003, with the swearing in of Members. The Premier and Executive Council had been sworn in on November 6, 2003. The Progressive Conservative government led by Danny Williams was elected with a victory over the Liberal Party. The Liberal and New Democratic Party (NDP) opposition was greatly decreased from what it was after the 1999 election.

Danny Williams was the Premier during this General Assembly.

== Timeline ==
- November 6, 2003 – Danny Williams is sworn in as Newfoundland and Labrador's 9th Premier.
- November 6, 2003 – Danny Williams' Cabinet Ministers are sworn in, to serve in Newfoundland and Labrador's new government.
- December 23, 2004 – Williams ordered all Canadian flags removed from provincial buildings in reply to a dispute with then-Prime Minister of Canada Paul Martin over his desire to shield Newfoundland and Labrador's offshore oil revenues from the calculation of its fiscal capacity, the basis for calculating equalization payments which redistribute wealth to poorer provinces.
- May 30, 2005 – Liberal Leader Roger Grimes resigns as Member of the House of Assembly (MHA) and Opposition Leader. His successor as MHA is Progressive Conservative, Clayton Forsey.
- May 30, 2005 – Gerry Reid, Liberal MHA, is named interim leader of the Newfoundland and Labrador Liberal Party, and Interim Opposition Leader.
- February 6, 2006 – Jim Bennett is acclaimed as leader of the Liberal Party of Newfoundland and Labrador.
- February 21, 2006 – Fabian Manning resigns as a Provincial Cabinet Minister and MHA. His successor is Progressive Conservative, Felix Collins.
- May 29, 2006 – Jim Bennett resigns as Liberal leader and Gerry Reid is chosen to serve as leader of the party.
- June 21, 2006 – Auditor General John Noseworthy's investigations into spending at the house of assembly, leads to the discovery of a Legislative spending scandal.
- November 1, 2006 – Jack Harris resigns as a Newfoundland and Labrador New Democratic Party Leader, and MHA. His successor as New Democrat Leader and MHA is social activist, Lorraine Michael.
- February 8, 2007 – Loyola Sullivan resigns as a MHA for Ferryland. Her successor is Progressive Conservative, Keith Hutchings.
- February 8, 2007 – Ed Byrne resigns as a MHA for Kilbride. His successor is Progressive Conservative, John Dinn.
- February 8, 2007 – Jim Hodder resigns as a MHA for Port au Port. His successor is Progressive Conservative, Tony Cornect.
- February 13, 2007 – Kathy Goudie resigns as a MHA for Humber Valley. Her successor is Liberal, Dwight Ball.
- February 13, 2007 – Randy Collins resigns as a MHA for Labrador West. His successor is Progressive Conservative, Jim Baker.
- February 13, 2007 – Wally Andersen, resigns as MHA for Torngat Mountains before the 2007 general election, after being charged with fraud. A by-election was never called and the district's seat remained vacant until the 2007 general election.

== Party standings ==
=== After the 2003 general election ===
Affiliation	Members
Progressive Conservative	34
Liberal Party	12
New Democratic Party	2
Total	48
Government Majority	20

=== Going into the 2007 general election ===
Affiliation	Members
Progressive Conservative	34
Liberal Party	12
New Democratic Party	1
Vacant	1
Total	48
Government Majority	20

== Members (MHAs) ==
Name	Party	Riding	First elected / previously elected
Paul Shelley	Progressive Conservative	Baie Verte-Springdale	1993
Eddie Joyce	Liberal	Bay of Islands	1989, 1999
Percy Barrett	Liberal	Bellevue	1989
Harry Harding	Progressive Conservative	Bonavista North	2002
Roger Fitzgerald†	Progressive Conservative	Bonavista South	1993
Kelvin Parsons	Liberal	Burgeo and La Poile	1999
Clyde Jackman	Progressive Conservative	Burin-Placentia West	2003
Jack Byrne	Progressive Conservative	Cape St. Francis	1993
George Sweeney	Liberal	Carbonear-Harbour Grace	1999
Yvonne Jones	Liberal	Cartwright-L'Anse au Clair	1996
Dianne Whalen	Progressive Conservative	Conception Bay East and Bell Island	2003
Terry French	Progressive Conservative	Conception Bay South	2002
Roger Grimes (2003–May 2005)	Liberal	Exploits	1989
Clayton Forsey (June 2005–October 2007)	Progressive Conservative	Exploits	2005
Loyola Sullivan (2003-February 2007)	Progressive Conservative	Ferryland	1992
Keith Hutchings (February–October 2007)	Progressive Conservative	Ferryland	2007
Oliver Langdon	Liberal	Fortune Bay-Cape La Hune	1989 (Note: First Elected as a Progressive Conservative)
Kevin O'Brien	Progressive Conservative	Gander	2003
Judy Foote	Liberal	Grand Bank	1996
Anna Thistle	Liberal	Grand Falls-Buchans	1996
Tom Hedderson	Progressive Conservative	Harbour Main-Whitbourne	1999
Tom Marshall	Progressive Conservative	Humber East	2003
Kathy Goudie (2003-February 2007)	Progressive Conservative	Humber Valley	2003
Dwight Ball (February–October 2007)	Liberal	Humber Valley	2007
Danny Williams	Progressive Conservative	Humber West	2001
Gerry Reid	Liberal	Isles of Notre Dame	1996
Ed Byrne (2003-February 2007)	Progressive Conservative	Kilbride	1993
John Dinn (February–October 2007)	Progressive Conservative	Kilbride	2007
Randy Collins (2003-February 2007)	New Democrat	Labrador West	1999
Jim Baker (February–October 2007)	Progressive Conservative	Labrador West	2007
John Hickey	Progressive Conservative	Lake Melville	2003
Tom Rideout	Progressive Conservative	Lewisporte	1975, (Note: Baie Verte-Springdale (First Elected as a Liberal)) 1999
Dave Denine	Progressive Conservative	Mount Pearl South	2003
Fabian Manning (2003–2006)	Progressive Conservative	Placentia and St. Mary's	1993, 1999
Felix Collins (2006–2007)	Progressive Conservative	Placentia and St. Mary's	2006
Jim Hodder (2003-February 2007)	Progressive Conservative	Port au Port	1975, (Note: First Elected as a Liberal) 2003
Tony Cornect (February–October 2007)	Progressive Conservative	Port au Port	2007
Roland Butler	Liberal	Port de Grave	2001
Jack Harris (2003–2006)	New Democrat	Signal Hill-Quidi Vidi	1990
Lorraine Michael (2006–2007)	New Democrat	Signal Hill-Quidi Vidi	2006
Wallace Young	Progressive Conservative	St. Barbe	2001
Joan Burke	Progressive Conservative	St. George's-Stephenville East	2003
Shawn Skinner	Progressive Conservative	St. John's Centre	2003
John Ottenheimer	Progressive Conservative	St. John's East	1996
Bob Ridgley	Progressive Conservative	St. John's North	2003
Tom Osborne	Progressive Conservative	St. John's South	1996
Sheila Osborne	Progressive Conservative	St. John's West	1997
Paul Oram	Progressive Conservative	Terra Nova	2003
Trevor Taylor	Progressive Conservative	The Straits – White Bay North	2001
Elizabeth Marshall	Progressive Conservative	Topsail	2003
Wally Andersen (Resigned February 2007)	Liberal	Torngat Mountains	1996
Vacant (February–October 2007)		Torngat Mountains	1996
Ross Wiseman	Progressive Conservative	Trinity North	2000
Charlene Johnson	Progressive Conservative	Trinity-Bay de Verde	2003
Kathy Dunderdale	Progressive Conservative	Virginia Waters	2003
Ray Hunter	Progressive Conservative	Windsor-Springdale	1999
