= 46th General Assembly of Newfoundland and Labrador =

46th General Assembly of Newfoundland
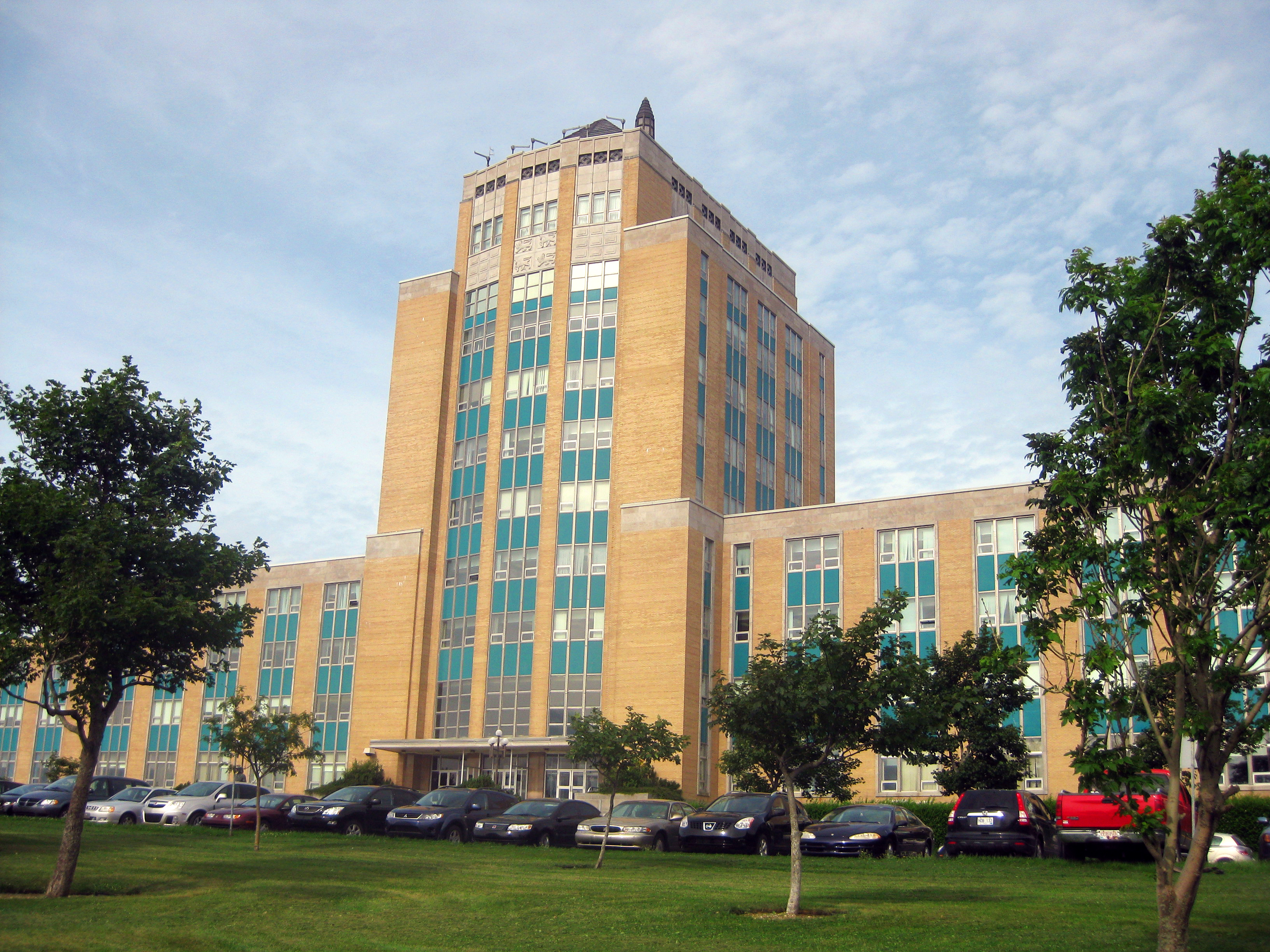
- Confederation Building East Block. Seat of the Newfoundland and Labrador government and the House of Assembly from 1960 to present.

History
- Founded: 2007
- Disbanded: 2011
- Preceded by: 45th General Assembly of Newfoundland and Labrador
- Succeeded by: 47th General Assembly of Newfoundland and Labrador

Leadership
- Premier: Danny Williams

Elections
- Last election: 2007 Newfoundland and Labrador general election

The 46th Newfoundland and Labrador House of Assembly was summoned to meet on March 10, 2008, its members having been sworn in and elected its speaker on November 1, 2007, and was dissolved on September 19, 2011. The Progressive Conservative government led by Danny Williams was re-elected with a landslide victory. The Liberal and NDP opposition was nearly wiped off the electoral map. Williams resigned in 2010 and his Deputy Premier Kathy Dunderdale was sworn in as the Premier.

== Members (MHAs) ==
Name	Party	Riding	First elected / previously elected
Tom Rideout	Progressive Conservative	Baie Verte-Springdale	1975, (Note: First Elected as a Liberal) 1999
Kevin Pollard (2008)	Progressive Conservative	Baie Verte-Springdale	2008
Terry Loder	Progressive Conservative	Bay of Islands	2007
Calvin Peach	Progressive Conservative	Bellevue	2007
Harry Harding	Progressive Conservative	Bonavista North	2002
Roger Fitzgerald†	Progressive Conservative	Bonavista South	1993
Kelvin Parsons	Liberal	Burgeo and La Poile	1999
Clyde Jackman	Progressive Conservative	Burin-Placentia West	2003
Jack Byrne	Progressive Conservative	Cape St. Francis	1993
Kevin Parsons (2008)	Progressive Conservative	Cape St. Francis	2008
Jerome Kennedy	Progressive Conservative	Carbonear-Harbour Grace	2007
Yvonne Jones	Liberal	Cartwright-L'Anse au Clair	1996
Dianne Whalen	Progressive Conservative	Conception Bay East – Bell Island	2003
David Brazil (2010)	Progressive Conservative	Conception Bay East – Bell Island	2010
Terry French	Progressive Conservative	Conception Bay South	2002
Clayton Forsey	Progressive Conservative	Exploits	2005
Keith Hutchings	Progressive Conservative	Ferryland	2007
Tracey Perry	Progressive Conservative	Fortune Bay-Cape La Hune	2007
Kevin O'Brien	Progressive Conservative	Gander	2003
Darin King	Progressive Conservative	Grand Bank	2007
Susan Sullivan	Progressive Conservative	Grand Falls-Windsor-Buchans	2007
Ray Hunter	Progressive Conservative	Grand Falls-Windsor-Green Bay South	1999
Tom Hedderson	Progressive Conservative	Harbour Main	1999
Tom Marshall	Progressive Conservative	Humber East	2003
Darryl Kelly	Progressive Conservative	Humber Valley	2007
Danny Williams	Progressive Conservative	Humber West	2001
Vaughn Granter (2011)	Progressive Conservative	Humber West	2011
Derrick Dalley	Progressive Conservative	Isles of Notre Dame	2007
John Dinn	Progressive Conservative	Kilbride	2007
Jim Baker	Progressive Conservative	Labrador West	2007
John Hickey	Progressive Conservative	Lake Melville	2003
Wade Verge	Progressive Conservative	Lewisporte	2007
Steve Kent	Progressive Conservative	Mount Pearl North	2007
Dave Denine	Progressive Conservative	Mount Pearl South	2003
Felix Collins	Progressive Conservative	Placentia and St. Mary's	2006
Tony Cornect	Progressive Conservative	Port au Port	2007
Roland Butler	Liberal	Port de Grave	2001
Lorraine Michael	NDP	Signal Hill-Quidi Vidi	2006
Wallace Young	Progressive Conservative	St. Barbe	2001
Joan Burke	Progressive Conservative	St. George's-Stephenville East	2003
Shawn Skinner	Progressive Conservative	St. John's Centre	2003
Ed Buckingham	Progressive Conservative	St. John's East	2007
Bob Ridgley	Progressive Conservative	St. John's North	2003
Tom Osborne	Progressive Conservative	St. John's South	1996
Sheila Osborne	Progressive Conservative	St. John's West	1997
Paul Oram	Progressive Conservative	Terra Nova	2003
Sandy Collins (2009)	Progressive Conservative	Terra Nova	2009
Trevor Taylor	Progressive Conservative	The Straits – White Bay North	2001
Marshall Dean (2009)	Liberal	The Straits – White Bay North	2009
Elizabeth Marshall	Progressive Conservative	Topsail	2003
Paul Davis (2010)	Progressive Conservative	Topsail	2010
Patty Pottle	Progressive Conservative	Torngat Mountains	2007
Ross Wiseman	Progressive Conservative	Trinity North	2000
Charlene Johnson	Progressive Conservative	Trinity-Bay de Verde	2003
Kathy Dunderdale	Progressive Conservative	Virginia Waters	2003

== Standings changes since 2007 general election ==
Number of members per party by date	2007			2008			2009				2010					2011
Number of members per party by date	Oct 5	Oct 9	Nov 6	Jun 4	Jun 30	Aug 27	Oct 2	Oct 7	Oct 27	Nov 26	Jan 29	Mar 16	Oct 3	Dec 2	Dec 3	Feb 15
Progressive Conservative	1	43	44	43	42	44	43	42		43	42	43	42	43	42	43
Liberal	0	3							4							
NDP	0	1														
Total members	1	47	48	47	46	48	47	46	47	48	47	48	47	48	47	48
Vacant	47	1	0	1	2	0	1	2	1	0	1	0	1	0	1	0
Government Majority	N/A	39	40	39	38	40	39	38	37	38	37	38	37	38	37	38

Membership changes in the 46th Assembly
Date	Name	District	Party	Reason
October 5, 2007	Roger Fitzgerald	Bonavista South	Progressive Conservative	Acclaimed in the general election
October 9, 2007	See List of Members			Election day of the 46th general election
November 6, 2007	Susan Sullivan	Grand Falls-Windsor-Buchans	Progressive Conservative	Elected in a differed election
June 4, 2008	Jack Byrne	Cape St. Francis	Progressive Conservative	Died
June 30, 2008	Tom Rideout	Baie Verte-Springdale	Progressive Conservative	Vacated seat
August 27, 2008	Kevin Parsons	Cape St. Francis	Progressive Conservative	Elected in a by-election.
August 27, 2008	Kevin Pollard	Baie Verte-Springdale	Progressive Conservative	Elected in a by-election.
October 2, 2009	Trevor Taylor	The Straits – White Bay North	Progressive Conservative	Resigned cabinet post and vacated seat
October 7, 2009	Paul Oram	Terra Nova	Progressive Conservative	Vacated seat
October 27, 2009	Marshall Dean	The Straits – White Bay North	Liberal	Elected in a by-election
November 26, 2009	Sandy Collins	Terra Nova	Progressive Conservative	Elected in a by-election
January 29, 2010	Elizabeth Marshall	Topsail	Progressive Conservative	Appointed to the Canadian Senate
March 16, 2010	Paul Davis	Topsail	Progressive Conservative	Elected in a by-election
October 3, 2010	Dianne Whalen	Conception Bay East – Bell Island	Progressive Conservative	Died of cancer
December 2, 2010	David Brazil	Conception Bay East – Bell Island	Progressive Conservative	Elected in a by-election
December 3, 2010	Danny Williams	Humber West	Progressive Conservative	Retired as Premier and vacated seat
February 15, 2011	Vaughn Granter	Humber West	Progressive Conservative	Elected in a by-election

== By-elections in the 46th General Assembly ==
Cape St. Francis, By-election – August 27, 2008 after the death of Jack Byrne
Party	Candidate	Votes	%	±%
Progressive Conservative	Kevin Parsons	2,865	68.97	
New Democratic Party	Kathleen Connors	972	23.40	
Liberal	Tonia Power-Mercer	317	7.63	
Total		4,154		

Baie Verte-Springdale, By-election, August 27, 2008 after the resignation of Tom Rideout
Party	Candidate	Votes	%	±%
Progressive Conservative	Kevin Pollard	1,979	55.90	
Liberal	Shaun Lane	1,245	35.17	
New Democratic Party	Tim Howse	316	8.97	
Total		3,540		

The Straits – White Bay North, By-Election, October 27, 2009 after the resignation of Trevor Taylor
Party	Candidate	Votes	%	±%
Liberal	Marshall Dean	1,925	47.58%	
Progressive Conservative	Rick Pelley	1,799	44.47%	–
NDP	Dale Colbourne	321	7.93%	

Terra Nova, By-Election, November 26, 2009 after the resignation of Paul Oram
Party	Candidate	Votes	%	±%
Progressive Conservative	Sandy Collins	2398	55%	-19.05%
Liberal	John Baird	1663	38.2%	+21.32%
NDP	Robin Brentnall	297	6.8%	-1.54%

Topsail, By-Election – March 16, 2010 after the Senate appointment of Elizabeth Marshall
Party	Candidate	Votes	%	±%
Progressive Conservative	Paul Davis	2737	81.42	-1.62
NDP	Brian Nolan	374	11.16	+2.91
Liberal	Shane Kennedy	238	7.10	-1.61

By-Election – December 2, 2010 after the death of Dianne Whalen
Party	Candidate	Votes	%	±%
Progressive Conservative	David Brazil	2638	66.28%	-5.51%
NDP	George Murphy	1043	26.20%	+15.96%
Liberal	Joy Buckle	299	7.51%	-10.46%

By-Election – February 15, 2011 after the resignation of Danny Williams
Party	Candidate	Votes	%	±%
Progressive Conservative	Vaughn Granter	2109	63.58%	–
Liberal	Mark Watton	1097	33.06%	
NDP	Rosie Myers	112	3.38%	
