= 2011 Progressive Conservative Party of Newfoundland and Labrador leadership election =

- Date: April 1–2, 2011
- Convention: St. John's, Newfoundland and Labrador
- Resigning leader: Danny Williams
- Won by: Kathy Dunderdale
- Ballots: acclamation
- Candidates: 1
- Entrance fee: $5,000

The 2011 Progressive Conservative Party of Newfoundland and Labrador leadership election was prompted by Danny Williams' announcement that he was resigning as premier and party leader on December 3, 2010. Premier Kathy Dunderdale, who was sworn in after Williams' resignation, was the only eligible candidate for leadership election and therefore became the leader-designate. Dunderdale was sworn in as leader at the party's convention on April 2, 2011.

Dunderdale will lead the party into the general election which is legislated be held on October 11, 2011.

== Timing ==
On November 25, 2010, Premier Danny Williams announced that he would be stepping down as leader of the party and Premier of the province on December 3, 2010. The party's caucus decided that Deputy Premier Kathy Dunderdale would become the tenth Premier of the province (and first woman to hold the office) on an interim basis until a successor is chosen for the leadership election. Nominations for the leadership opened on December 30, 2010, and closed on January 10, 2011. The rules to enter the race state that you must submit $5,000 and 50 signatures from party members. After the close of nominations Dunderdale along with Brad Cabana were the only two people who came forward to run. On January 11, 2011, the PC Party announced that Cabana's nomination was not valid because, while he had collected 73 names, not enough of them were PC Party members to meet the 50 signature requirement for a leadership candidate. Cabana appealed the party's decision but it was announced on January 27, 2011, that the rules committee upheld the previous ruling by the credentials committee. With Cabana being ineligible to run Dunderdale was officially named the leader-designate, with her leadership to be ratified at the party's convention this spring.

== Declared candidates ==
=== Kathy Dunderdale ===
MHA for Virginia Waters (since 2003), Minister of Innovation, Trade and Rural Development (2003–2006), Minister of Natural Resources (2006–2010), Deputy Premier (2008–2010), Premier (since 2010)

Caucus supporters:(43) Jim Baker, David Brazil, Ed Buckingham, Joan Burke, Felix Collins, Sandy Collins, Tony Cornect, Derrick Dalley, Paul Davis, Dave Denine, John Dinn, Kathy Dunderdale, Roger Fitzgerald, Clayton Forsey, Terry French, Harry Harding, Tom Hedderson, John Hickey, Ray Hunter, Keith Hutchings, Clyde Jackman, Charlene Johnson, Darryl Kelly, Jerome Kennedy, Steve Kent, Darin King, Terry Loder, Tom Marshall, Kevin O'Brien, Sheila Osborne, Tom Osborne, Kevin Parsons, Calvin Peach, Tracey Perry, Kevin Pollard, Patty Pottle, Bob Ridgley, Shawn Skinner, Susan Sullivan, Wade Verge, Ross Wiseman, Wallace Young
Date campaign launched: December 30, 2010

== Ineligible candidate ==
=== Brad Cabana ===
Cabana, who runs a politics blog and was previously mayor of the Saskatchewan village of Elstow, was unable to enter the race because there were not enough party members among the 73 signatures he collected to secure nomination.

Caucus supporters:
Date campaign launched:January 10, 2011

== Potential candidates who did not enter ==
- Joan Burke, MHA for St. George's-Stephenville East, House Leader, Minister of Child Youth and Family Services.
- Joe Hickey, Vice President Business Development and Marketing at Ultra Electronics TCS.
- Rick Hillier, Former Chief of Defence Staff and current Chancellor of Memorial University of Newfoundland.
- Jerome Kennedy, MHA for Carbonear-Harbour Grace, Minister of Health and Community Services.
- Steve Kent, MHA for Mount Pearl North, Parliamentary Secretary to the Minister Responsible for the Forestry and Agrifoods Agency.
- Darin King, MHA for Grand Bank, Minister of Education.
- Elizabeth Marshall, Canadian Senator, former Health Minister.
- Tom Marshall, MHA for Humber East, Minister of Finance.
- Kevin O'Brien, MHA for Gander, Minister of Municipal Affairs.
- Tim Powers, Vice-President of Summa Communications.
- Shawn Skinner - MHA for St. John's Centre, Minister of Natural Resources.

== Timeline ==
- November 25, 2010 – Premier Williams announces he will resign as leader and Premier on December 3, 2010.
- December 3, 2010 – Williams resigns and Kathy Dunderdale is sworn in as Newfoundland and Labrador's 10th Premier. As well she announces she will not run for the PC leadership.
- December 6, 2010 – Premier Dunderdale shuffles two members of her Cabinet to fill her previous portfolio of Natural Resources.
- December 17, 2010 – Premier Dunderdale announces she is reconsidering running for the leadership.
- December 22, 2010 – Health Minister Jerome Kennedy and Education Minister Darin King both announce they will not seek the leadership of the Party. Both Ministers said they will encourages Premier Dunderdale to run.
- December 23, 2010 – Finance Minister Tom Marshall and Municipal Affairs Minister Kevin O'Brien announces they will not be candidates in the leadership race and will back Premier Dunderdale if she enters.
- December 29, 2010 – MHA Steve Kent announces he will not run and endorses Dunderdale.
- December 30, 2010 – Premier Kathy Dunderdale announces her candidacy for the leadership and is endorsed by her entire caucus.
- January 10, 2011 – Joe Hickey announces he will not seek the leadership of the party. Brad Cabana enters the leadership race just hours before nominations for the election close.
- January 11, 2011 – The PC Party announce that Cabana is unable to enter the race because he did not collect the 50 signatures from party members which was needed to be nominated.
- January 12, 2011 – Cabana announces that an aide to Minister Ross Wiseman threatened him if he tried to run for the leadership.
- January 13, 2011 – Cabana files an appeal over the party's ruling that he was ineligible to enter the race.
- January 27, 2011 – Cabana's appeal is denied by the rules committee, Dunderdale becomes leader-designate.
- April 2, 2011 – Dunderdale is sworn in as party leader.

== See also ==
- Progressive Conservative Party of Newfoundland and Labrador
