= Department of Social Supports and Well-Being =

Government Department in Newfoundland and Labrador

Agency overview
- Formed: April 9, 2009
- Preceding agencies: Department of Health and Community Services; Department of Child, Youth and Family Services; Department of Children, Seniors and Social Development; Department of Families and Affordability
- Jurisdiction: Newfoundland and Labrador
- Headquarters: St. John's
- Minister responsible: Chris Tibbs
- Website: www.gov.nl.ca/sswb/

The Ministry of Social Supports and Well-Being (commonly abbreviated SSWB) is a provincial government department in Newfoundland and Labrador, Canada. The department is headed by a member of the provincial cabinet, typically a Member of the House of Assembly, who is chosen by the premier and formally appointed by the Lieutenant-Governor of Newfoundland and Labrador.

The department's creation was announced in April 2009, by the government of Danny Williams. Before becoming a stand-alone department many aspects of the department were a branch within the Department of Health and Community Services.

Child and Youth Services is responsible for: child protection services, foster care, adoption, kinship, youth services, and youth corrections programs. The department is also responsible for the disability policy office, adult protection, and income support.

The department was reconfigured as the Department of Children, Seniors and Social Development in 2016.

In a report released in November 2016, NL Auditor General Terry Paddon said 6,252 children — eight percent of the children in Newfoundland and Labrador — were being served by CSSD (Child and Youth Services) programs.

In 2021, the income support division of Immigration, Skills and Labour was relocated into CSSD.

On May 9, 2025, Jamie Korab was appointed Minister of Families and Affordability. On October 29, 2025, Joedy Wall was appointed Minister. On August 20, 2026, Chris Tibbs was appointed Minister.

== Background ==
Up until 1997, the responsibility for child protection services in Newfoundland and Labrador was under the purview of the Department of Social Services (DSS). In 1997, DSS was renamed the Department of Human Resources and Employment (DHRE). On April 1, 1998, the Department of Health and Community Services (DHCS) assumed responsibility for child protection services. The responsibility for child protection services was therefore devolved from the DHRE to a number of Health and Community Services (HCS) Boards. In 2009, the Government of Newfoundland and Labrador established the Department of Child, Youth and Family Services (CYFS). In May 2025, the department was renamed the Department of Families and Affordability. On October 29, 2025, the department was renamed the Department of Social Supports and Well-Being.

== Ministers ==
Key:

Progressive Conservative Party of Newfoundland and Labrador
Liberal Party of Newfoundland and Labrador

No.	Portrait	Name	Term of office		Political party	Premier
1		Joan Burke	April 9, 2009	January 13, 2011	Progressive Conservative	Danny Williams; Kathy Dunderdale
2		Charlene Johnson	January 13, 2011	October 9, 2013	Progressive Conservative	Kathy Dunderdale
3		Paul Davis	October 9, 2013	May 1, 2014	Progressive Conservative	Kathy Dunderdale; Tom Marshall
4		Clyde Jackman	May 1, 2014	July 27, 2014	Progressive Conservative	Tom Marshall
5		Sandy Collins	July 17, 2014	December 14, 2015	Progressive Conservative	Tom Marshall; Paul Davis
6		Sherry Gambin-Walsh	December 14, 2015	July 31, 2017	Liberal	Dwight Ball
7		Lisa Dempster	July 31, 2017	August 19, 2020	Liberal	Dwight Ball
8		Brian Warr	August 19, 2020	April 8, 2021	Liberal	Andrew Furey
9		John Abbott	April 8, 2021	June 14, 2023	Liberal	Andrew Furey
10		Paul Pike	June 14, 2023	May 9, 2025	Liberal	Andrew Furey
11		Jamie Korab	May 9, 2025	August 15, 2025	Liberal	John Hogan
12		Bernard Davis	August 15, 2025	October 14, 2025	Liberal	John Hogan
13		Joedy Wall	October 29, 2025	August 20, 2026	Progressive Conservative	Tony Wakeham
14		Chris Tibbs	August 20, 2026	Incumbent	Progressive Conservative	Tony Wakeham

== See also ==
- Executive Council of Newfoundland and Labrador
- Mount Cashel Orphanage
- Murder of Zachary Turner
