= Glen Greening =

Canadian politician

Member of the Newfoundland and Labrador House of Assembly for Terra Nova
- In office 1983–1993
- Preceded by: Tom Lush
- Succeeded by: Kay Young

Personal details
- Born: November 3, 1947
- Died: August 5, 2019 (aged 71)
- Party: Progressive Conservative Party of Newfoundland and Labrador

Glen Clayton Greening (November 3, 1947 – August 5, 2019) was a Canadian politician who was elected to the Newfoundland and Labrador House of Assembly in a 1983 by-election. He represented the electoral district of Terra Nova as a member of the Progressive Conservative Party of Newfoundland and Labrador. He lived in Mount Pearl.

Greening died of cancer in 2019 at the age of 71.
