= 2007 Newfoundland and Labrador general election =

Canadian provincial election

- October 9, 2007

48 seats in the 46th General Assembly of Newfoundland and Labrador 25 seats needed for a majority
- Turnout: 61.3% (▼11.2 pp)
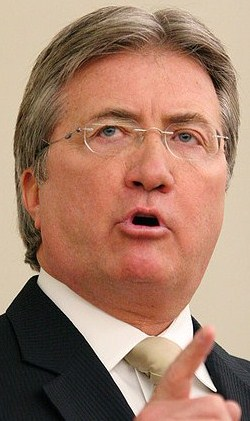

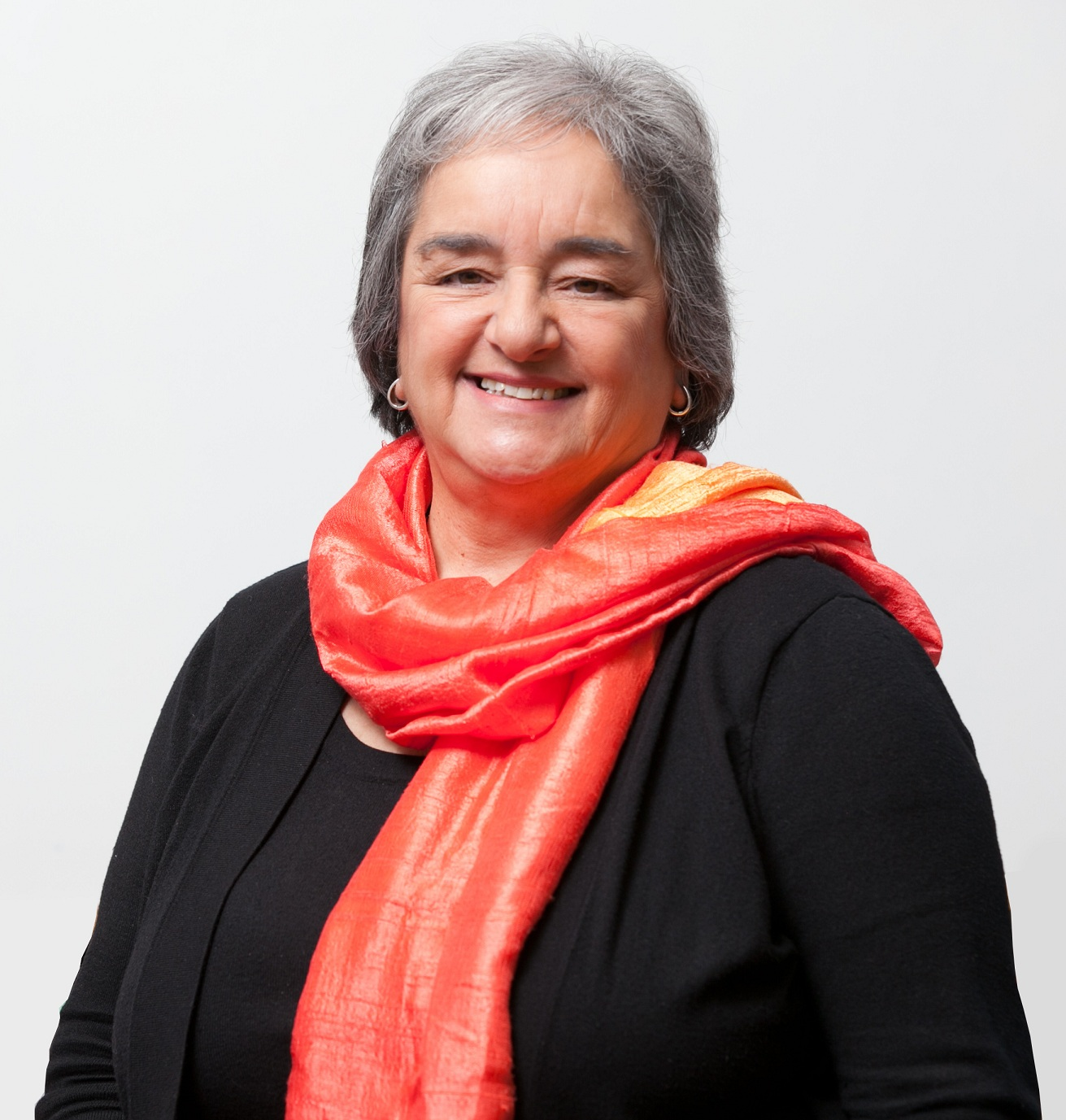
	First party	Second party	Third party
		LIB
Leader	Danny Williams	Gerry Reid	Lorraine Michael
Party	Progressive Conservative	Liberal	New Democratic
Leader since	2001	2006	2006
Leader's seat	Humber West	The Isles of Notre Dame (lost re-election)	Signal Hill-Quidi Vidi
Last election	34 seats, 58.71%	12 seats, 33.05%	2 seats, 6.86%
Seats won	44	3	1
Seat change	▲10	▼9	▼1
Popular vote	155,943	48,598	19,028
Percentage	69.59%	21.69%	8.49%
Swing	▲10.88pp	▼11.36pp	▲1.63pp
- Popular vote by riding. As this is an FPTP election, seat totals are not determined by popular vote, but instead via results by each riding. Click the map for more details.
Premier before election
Danny Williams
Progressive Conservative
Premier after election
Danny Williams
Progressive Conservative

The 2007 Newfoundland and Labrador general election was held on October 9, 2007, to elect members of the 46th General Assembly of Newfoundland and Labrador.

== Campaign ==
The election was called soon after Premier Danny Williams announced the popular Hebron Oil Field deal, and it was widely considered a foregone conclusion that Williams' Progressive Conservatives would be reelected. Polls during the campaign showed the Conservatives reaching up to 73 per cent of voter support, leading some commentators to speculate that the party could in fact win every seat in the House of Assembly — a feat accomplished only twice before in Canadian history, in Prince Edward Island in the 1935 election and in New Brunswick in the 1987 election.

On election day, the Progressive Conservatives did win ten more seats than they held at the dissolution of the previous legislature, and won just under 70 per cent of the popular vote, the highest popular vote share ever attained by a party in the province. However, they did not sweep all 48 seats in the legislature though their popular vote share was higher than the winning party's share in the 1935 PEI election and the 1987 New Brunswick election. Three Liberal incumbents, as well as New Democratic Party leader Lorraine Michael, successfully held their seats. Notably, however, Liberal leader Gerry Reid was not reelected in his own riding.

== Grand Falls-Windsor—Buchans and Bonavista South ==
On October 1, 2007, Gerry Tobin, Liberal candidate in the riding of Grand Falls-Windsor—Buchans, was found dead in his home. As a result, the chief electoral officer postponed the election in that riding until November 6, 2007. The Progressive Conservatives won the special election, bringing their total number of seats in the legislature to 44.

Subsequently, Clayton Hobbs, Liberal candidate in the riding of Bonavista South, dropped out of the race, citing health reasons; consequently, incumbent Progressive Conservative MHA Roger Fitzgerald was declared re-elected.

== Results ==
Party	Seats	Second	Third	Fourth
Progressive Conservative	44	4	0	0
Liberal	3	34	9	0
New Democratic	1	9	26	0
Labrador Party	0	0	1	0

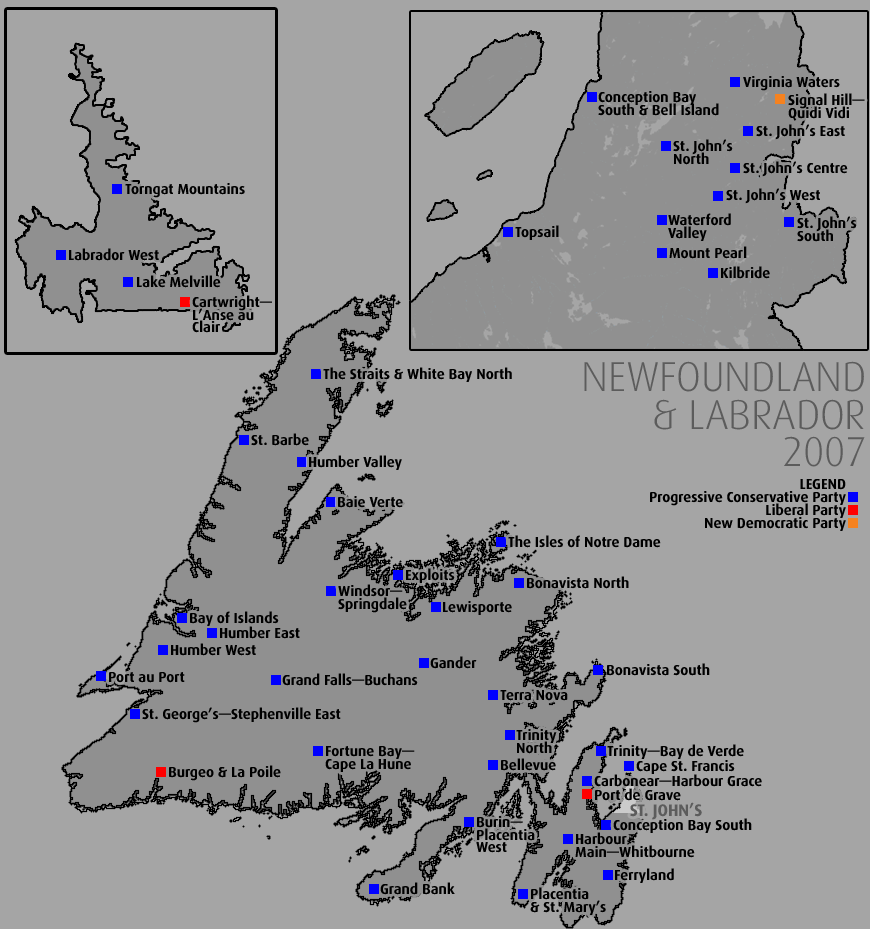
Riding-by-riding results

=== Results by party ===
Summary of the Legislative Assembly of Newfoundland and Labrador election results
Party	Party leader	Candidates	Seats				Popular vote		
Party	Party leader	Candidates	2003	Dissol.	2007	Change	#	%	Change
Progressive Conservative	Danny Williams	*48	34	34	44	+10	155,943	69.59%	+10.88%
Liberal	Gerry Reid	*46	12	11	3	-9	48,598	21.69%	-11.36%
New Democratic	Lorraine Michael	36	2	1	1	-1	19,028	8.49%	+1.63%
Independent and no affiliation		3	-	-	-	-	446	0.20%	-%
Labrador	Ron Barron	1	*	-	-	-	68	0.03%	-%
Vacant				2					
Total		132	48	48	48	-	224,083	100.00%	

=== Results by region ===
Party Name		St. John's	St. John's Suburbs	Avalon/Burin	Central	Western/ Southern	Labrador	Total
Parties winning seats in the legislature:
Progressive Conservative	Seats:	6	7	8	11	9	3	44
Progressive Conservative	Popular Vote:	69.38%	80.71%	69.50%	70.89%	64.81%	48.53%	69.59%
Liberal	Seats:	-	-	1	-	1	1	3
Liberal	Popular Vote:	10.50%	11.42%	22.46%	23.12%	33.09%	34.78%	21.69%
New Democratic	Seats:	1	-	-	-	-	-	1
New Democratic	Popular Vote:	19.10%	7.79%	8.04%	5.85%	2.10%	16.14%	8.49%
Parties that won no seats in the legislature
Independent	Popular Vote:	1.02%	0.08%	-	0.14%	-	-	0.20%
Labrador Party	Popular Vote:	-	-	-	-	-	0.55%	0.03%
Total seats:		7	7	9	11	10	4	48

== Results by riding ==
Bold incumbents indicates party leaders. The premier's name is boldfaced and italicized.

- All candidate names are those on the official list of confirmed candidates; names in media or on party website may differ slightly.
- Names in **boldface type** represent party leaders.
- † represents that the incumbent is not running again.
- § represents that the incumbent was defeated for nomination.
- ₰ represents that the incumbent ran in another district and lost the nomination
- ‡ represents that the incumbent is running in a different district.

=== St. John's ===
Electoral district	Candidates				Incumbent
Electoral district	PC	Liberal	NDP	Other	Incumbent
Kilbride; 57.35% turnout	John Dinn; 4,443; 84.48%	Roger Linehan; 364; 6.92%	Michelle Broderick; 421; 8.01%	Paul Perrier (Independent); 31; 0.59%	John Dinn
St. John's Centre; 57.89% turnout	Shawn Skinner; 3,332; 76.49%	Lori Ann Campbell-Martino; 374; 8.59%	Jane Robinson; 650; 14.92%		Shawn Skinner
St. John's East; 65.84% turnout	Ed Buckingham; 3,649; 70.09%	Peter Adams; 692; 13.29%	Gemma Schlamp-Hickey; 864; 16.60%		John Ottenheimer†
St. John's North; 56.33% turnout	Bob Ridgley; 3,488; 77.55%	Simon Lono; 561; 12.47%	Matt Power; 449; 9.98%		Bob Ridgley
St. John's South; 64.88% turnout	Tom Osborne; 3,887; 79.60%	Rex Gibbons; 425; 8.70%	Clyde Bridger; 571; 11.69%		Tom Osborne
St. John's West; 65.08% turnout	Sheila Osborne; 3,623; 72.69%	George Joyce; 1,018; 20.43%	Joan Scott; 344; 6.90%		Sheila Osborne
Signal Hill—Quidi Vidi; 71.45% turnout	Maria Afonso; 2,135; 39.87%	Maura Beam; 158; 2.95%	**Lorraine Michael**; 3,062; 57.18%		**Lorraine Michael**
Virginia Waters; 56.12% turnout	**Kathy Dunderdale**; 4,043; 73.04%	Drew Brown; 429; 7.75%	Dave Sullivan; 710; 12.83%	Fred Wilcox (Independent); 353; 6.38%	**Kathy Dunderdale**

=== St. John's suburbs ===
Electoral district	Candidates			Incumbent
Electoral district	PC	Liberal	NDP	Incumbent
Cape St. Francis; 71.01% turnout	Jack Byrne; 4,983; 77.45%	Bill Tapper; 739; 11.49%	Kathleen Connors; 680; 10.57%	Jack Byrne
Conception Bay East—Bell Island; 59.70% turnout	Dianne Whalen; 3,991; 71.55%	Linda Goodyear; 999; 17.91%	Gavin Will; 569; 10.20%	Dianne Whalen
Conception Bay South; 61.97% turnout	Terry French; 4,670; 79.10%	Jerry Young; 953; 10.03%	Touria Tougui; 259; 4.64%	Terry French
Mount Pearl North; 61.36% turnout	Steve Kent; 4,751; 84.72%	Elaine Reid; 505; 9.00%	Janice Lockyer; 330; 5.88%	Harvey Hodder†; Waterford Valley
Mount Pearl South; 61.11% turnout	Dave Denine; 4,163; 84.12%	William Reid; 441; 8.91%	Tom McGinnis; 332; 6.71%	Dave Denine; Mount Pearl
Topsail; 59.49% turnout	Elizabeth Marshall; 4,892; 82.85%	Cynthia Barron-Layden; 513; 8.69%	Kyle Rees; 486; 8.23%	Elizabeth Marshall

=== Avalon and Burin Peninsulas ===
Electoral district	Candidates			Incumbent
Electoral district	PC	Liberal	NDP	Incumbent
Bellevue; 68.11% turnout	Calvin Peach; 2,908; 55.82%	Denise Pike; 2,139; 41.06%	Ian Slade; 155; 2.98%	Percy Barrett †
Burin—Placentia West; 69.35% turnout	Clyde Jackman; 3,141; 59.09%	George Brake; 457; 8.60%	Julie Mitchell; 1,704; 32.05%	Clyde Jackman
Carbonear—Harbour Grace; 67.40% turnout	Jerome Kennedy; 4,367; 74.14%	Paul Baldwin; 1,463; 24.84%		George Sweeney †
Ferryland; 60.51% turnout	Keith Hutchings; 4,256; 83.40%	Kevin Bennett; 472; 9.25%	Grace Bavington; 351; 6.88%	Keith Hutchings
Grand Bank; 63.37% turnout	Darin King; 3,563; 79.69%	Rod Cake; 889; 19.88%		Judy Foote†
Harbour Main; 62.51% turnout	Tom Hedderson; 4,586; 82.25%	Kevin Slaney; 635; 11.39%	Jean Dandenault; 323; 5.79%	Tom Hedderson; Harbour Main-Whitbourne
Placentia—St. Mary's; 51.58% turnout	Felix Collins; 3,086; 78.24%		Jennifer Coultas; 812; 20.64%	Felix Collins
Port de Grave; 76.44% turnout	Glenn Littlejohn; 3,069; 46.62%	Roland Butler; 3,329; 50.57%	Randy Dawe; 162; 2.46%	Roland Butler
Trinity—Bay de Verde; 71.61% turnout	Charlene Johnson; 3,572; 71.65%	Bruce Layman; 1,137; 22.81%	Don Penney; 257; 5.16%	Charlene Johnson

=== Central Newfoundland ===
Electoral district	Candidates				Incumbent
Electoral district	PC	Liberal	NDP	Other	Incumbent
Baie Verte—Springdale; 55.78% turnout	Tom Rideout; 3,388; 75.14%	Glendon Bungay; 798; 17.70%	Tim Howse; 301; 6.68%		Vacant (Note: Paul Shelley had resigned his seat on July 12, 2007, and a by-election had not been held to fill the seat prior to the general election call.); Baie Verte-Springdale
Bonavista North; 59.20% turnout	Harry Harding; 2,883; 67.09%	Winston Carter; 1,292; 30.07%	Howard Parsons; 80; 1.86%		Harry Harding
Bonavista South	Roger Fitzgerald won by acclamation	(Note: Clayton Hobbs was originally the Liberal candidate, but he withdrew prior to the election.)			Roger Fitzgerald
Exploits; 63.13% turnout	Clayton Forsey; 3,396; 72.16%	Jody Fancey; 1,295; 27.52%			Clayton Forsey
Gander; 55.91% turnout	Kevin O'Brien; 3,599; 74.36%	Stephanie Winsor; 1,193; 24.65%			Kevin O'Brien
Grand Falls-Windsor—Buchans (Note: Due to the death of Liberal candidate Gerry Tobin on October 1, the election in the riding of Grand Falls-Windsor-Buchans was delayed. The deferred election for this riding took place on November 6, 2007, with the Liberals nominating John Woodrow in Tobin's place.); 52.60% turnout	Susan Sullivan; 2,767; 71.63%	John J. Woodrow (Note: Woodrow briefly suspended his campaign on November 3, 2007 when it became known that he had falsely accused former Premier Beaton Tulk of bribery. However, being unable to remove his name from the ballot, Woodrow revived his campaign on November 5, 2007.); 163; 4.22%	Junior C. Downey; 922; 23.87%		Anna Thistle†; Grand Falls-Buchans
Grand Falls-Windsor—Green Bay South; 53.73% turnout	Ray Hunter; 2,535; 68.68%	Aubrey Smith; 957; 25.93%	John Whelan; 188; 5.09%		Ray Hunter; Windsor-Springdale
Lewisporte; 48.49% turnout	Wade Verge; 2,660; 70.43%	John Martin; 647; 17.13%	Garry Vatcher; 460; 12.18%		Tom Rideout
Terra Nova; 55.71% turnout	Paul Oram; 3,427; 73.84%	Katty Gallant; 781; 16.83%	Bill Cashin; 358; 7.71%	Lionel Glover (Independent); 62; 1.34%	Paul Oram
The Isles of Notre Dame; 66.78% turnout	Derrick Dalley; 2,371; 49.88%	**Gerry Reid**; 2,364; 49.74%			**Gerry Reid**; Twillingate and Fogo
Trinity North; 57.21% turnout	Ross Wiseman; 3,939; 81.77%	Kathryn Small; 609; 12.64%	Janet Stringer; 247; 5.13%		Ross Wiseman

=== Western and Southern Newfoundland ===
Electoral district	Candidates			Incumbent
Electoral district	PC	Liberal	NDP	Incumbent
Bay of Islands; 73.45% turnout	Terry Loder; 2,817; 51.56%	Eddie Joyce; 2,520; 46.12%	Charlie Murphy; 107; 1.96%	Eddie Joyce
Burgeo—La Poile; 62.46% turnout	Colin Short; 1,864; 38.45%	Kelvin Parsons; 2,882; 59.45%	June Hiscock; 85; 1.75%	Kelvin Parsons
Fortune Bay—Cape La Hune; 65.00% turnout	Tracey Perry; 2,539; 62.86%	Elvis Loveless; 1,394; 34.51%	Sheldon Hynes; 84; 2.08%	Oliver Langdon†
Humber East; 64.97% turnout	Tom Marshall; 4,160; 83.48%	Michael Hoffe; 537; 10.78%	Jean Graham; 256; 5.14%	Tom Marshall
Humber Valley; 74.29% turnout	Darryl Kelly; 3,023; 51.29%	Dwight Ball; 2,769; 46.98%	Kris Hynes; 87; 1.48%	Dwight Ball
Humber West; 59.89% turnout	**Danny Williams**; 3,755; 87.39%	Maurice Budgell; 516; 12.01%		**Danny Williams**
Port au Port; 61.10% turnout	Tony Cornect; 3,936; 80.80%	Michelle Felix-Morgan; 910; 18.68%		Tony Cornect
St. Barbe; 58.04% turnout	Wallace Young; 2,491; 58.47%	Jim Bennett; 1,560; 36.62%	Gary Noel; 196; 4.60%	Wallace Young
St. George's—Stephenville East; 58.86% turnout	Joan Burke; 3,143; 74.36%	George Lee; 1,062; 25.12%		Joan Burke
The Straits - White Bay North; 66.78% turnout	Trevor Taylor; 2,651; 62.66%	Boyd Noel; 1,358; 32.10%	Gerry Ryall; 171; 4.04%	Trevor Taylor

=== Labrador ===
Electoral district	Candidates				Incumbent
Electoral district	PC	Liberal	NDP	Labrador	Incumbent
Cartwright—L'Anse au Clair; 74.28% turnout	Dennis Normore; 646; 26.92%	Yvonne Jones; 1,736; 72.33%			Yvonne Jones
Labrador West; 68.36% turnout	Jim Baker; 2,204; 50.69%	Karen Oldford; 287; 6.60%	Darrel Brenton; 1,848; 42.50%		Jim Baker
Lake Melville; 70.28% turnout	John Hickey; 2,380; 56.29%	Chris Montague; 1,672; 39.55%	Bill Cooper; 147; 3.48%		John Hickey
Torngat Mountains; 71.19% turnout	Patty Pottle; 794; 53.65%	Danny Dumaresque; 604; 40.81%		Jim Tuttauk; 109; 7.36%	Vacant (Note: Wally Andersen had resigned his seat on September 5, 2007, and a by-election had not been held to fill the seat prior to the general election call.)

== Election Results by Party and Seats ==
Election	Progressive Conservative	Liberal	NDP
2007	44	3	1

== See also ==
- 46th General Assembly of Newfoundland and Labrador
- Speaker of the House of Assembly of Newfoundland and Labrador
- List of Newfoundland and Labrador General Assemblies
- List of Newfoundland and Labrador political parties

=== General resources ===
- Government of Newfoundland and Labrador
- Elections Newfoundland and Labrador

=== Election coverage ===
- Election Almanac - Newfoundland and Labrador Provincial Election
- Professor Antweiler's Voter Migration Election Forecaster - Newfoundland and Labrador Provincial Election 2007

=== Parties ===
- Progressive Conservative Party of Newfoundland and Labrador (see also Conservative Party of Canada)
- Liberal Party of Newfoundland and Labrador (see also Liberal Party of Canada)
- Newfoundland and Labrador New Democratic Party (see also New Democratic Party)
