= Kay Young =

Canadian politician

The Honourable Kay Young ECNL

Minister of Social Services
- In office August 26, 1994 – March 14, 1996
- Preceded by: Tom Lush
- Succeeded by: Joan Marie Aylward

MHA for Terra Nova
- In office 1993–1996
- Preceded by: Glen Greening
- Succeeded by: Tom Lush

Personal details
- Party: Liberal

Caroline Kate (Kay) Young (born January 30, 1944) is a former Canadian politician. She represented the riding of Terra Nova in the Newfoundland and Labrador House of Assembly from 1993 to 1996 as a member of the Liberal Party.

The daughter of Wallace Diamond and Nellie Emberley, she was born Caroline Kate Diamond in Whitbourne, Newfoundland and Labrador, and was educated at Memorial University. She was a teacher in Lethbridge from 1967 to 1993. She married Walter Young.

She defeated Progressive Conservative incumbent Glen Greening to win a seat in the Newfoundland assembly in 1993. Young was Minister of Social Services and Minister responsible for the Status of Women. She ran unsuccessfully in the redistributed riding of Bonavista South in 1996, losing to Roger Fitzgerald.
