= Tom Lush =

Canadian politician

The Honourable Tom Lush ECNL

Speaker of the Newfoundland House of Assembly
- In office 1989–1993
- Preceded by: Patrick McNicholas
- Succeeded by: Paul Dicks

Member of the House of Assembly for Terra Nova
- In office 1996–2003
- Preceded by: Kay Young
- Succeeded by: Paul Oram
- In office 1975–1983
- Preceded by: District Created
- Succeeded by: Glenn Greening

Member of the House of Assembly for Bonavista North
- In office 1985–1996
- Preceded by: W. George Cross
- Succeeded by: Beaton Tulk

Personal details
- Born: March 1, 1939 Gambo, Dominion of Newfoundland
- Party: Liberal
- Education: Memorial University
- Occupation: teacher, principal

Thomas Lush (born March 1, 1939) is a Canadian educator and former politician in Newfoundland and Labrador. He represented the riding of Terra Nova in the Newfoundland and Labrador House of Assembly from 1975 to 1983 and from 1996 to 2003, and Bonavista North from 1985 to 1996. He was a member of the Liberal Party.

He was born in Gambo, the son of Gordon Lush, and was educated at Memorial University. He taught school in various Newfoundland communities, also serving as vice-principal and principal. In 1962, Lush married Lillie Calloway.

He was elected to the assembly in 1975 and was reelected in 1979 and 1982. He resigned his seat to return to teaching in 1983 but then was elected to the assembly again in 1985. Lush was speaker for the House of Assembly from 1989 to 1993. He served in the Executive Council as Minister of Social Services from 1993 to 1994 and Minister of Inter-Governmental Affairs from 2001 to 2003. Lush was government house leader from 2000 to 2003. He was later the President of the Liberal Party of Canada's riding association in St. John's East.
