= Colin Holloway =

Canadian politician

Colin Holloway MHA

Member of the Newfoundland and Labrador House of Assembly for Terra Nova
- In office November 30, 2015 – April 17, 2019
- Preceded by: Sandy Collins
- Succeeded by: Lloyd Parrott

Personal details
- Party: Liberal

Colin Holloway is a Canadian politician, who was elected to the Newfoundland and Labrador House of Assembly in the 2015 provincial election. He represented the electoral district of Terra Nova as a member of the Liberal Party until his 2019 election defeat.

In 2018, he filed a complaint against four politicians, citing that he wanted "bullying and intimidation to end." One complaint was against Dale Kirby and Eddie Joyce for intimidation and harassment while selecting the speaker of the house. Both MHAs were cleared of any wrongdoing, disappointing Holloway.
