= Lloyd Parrott =

Canadian politician

The Honourable Lloyd Parrott ECNL MHA
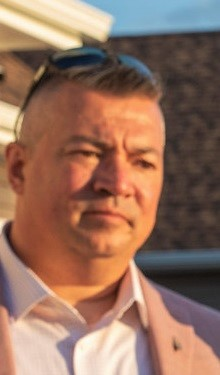

Member of the Newfoundland and Labrador House of Assembly for Terra Nova
- Incumbent
- Assumed office May 16, 2019
- Preceded by: Colin Holloway

Minister of Energy and Mines
- Incumbent
- Assumed office October 29, 2025
- Preceded by: Steve Crocker

Government House Leader
- Incumbent
- Assumed office October 29, 2025
- Preceded by: Lisa Dempster

Minister of Labour
- Incumbent
- Assumed office August 20, 2026
- Preceded by: Mike Goosney

Minister of Government Services
- Incumbent
- Assumed office August 20, 2026
- Preceded by: Mike Goosney

Minister of Red Tape Reduction
- Incumbent
- Assumed office August 20, 2026
- Preceded by: Office established

Personal details
- Party: Progressive Conservative
- Occupation: Politician, soldier

Lloyd K. Parrott is a Newfoundland Canadian politician, who was elected to the Newfoundland and Labrador House of Assembly in the 2019 provincial election. He represents the electoral district of Terra Nova as a member of the Newfoundland and Labrador Progressive Conservative Party.

== Background ==
Parrott grew up in Wabush, Labrador and moved to Clarenville in 2011. Parrott is a former member of the Clarenville town council (2017-2019). He is a retired member of the military, and has served on various boards in the province, including the Hebron Project Employers Association, Construction Labour Relations Association of N.L., Alpine Development Alliance Corp. and a trustee of the Teamsters Union in N.L.

Parrott is an amputee stating to CBC News in 2023: "I lost my leg because of military injury in 2007". Parrott is the first amputee to serve in the provincial legislature.

== Provincial Politics ==
Parrott was first elected in 2019. He was re-elected in the 2021 provincial election.

On July 4, 2022, Parrott announced he would be a candidate in the 2023 provincial PC leadership election. Parrott formally launched his campaign on April 18, 2023 in Clarenville. Parrott lost placing a distant third on the first ballot.

Parrott was re-elected in the 2025 Newfoundland and Labrador general election.

=== Cabinet Minister ===
The PC Party won a majority in the 2025 election. On October 29, 2025, Parrott was appointed to Minister of Energy and Mines, and Government House Leader.

On May 21, 2026, Parrott was entangled in a shouting match with Liberal MHA Elvis Loveless in the House of Assembly, with spillovers outside the House. On May 25, Speaker Paul Lane deemed both Parrott's and Loveless's behavior 'unacceptable' and both were made to withdraw from the House.

On August 20, 2026, a cabinet shuffled occurred within the Wakeham ministry. Parrott kept all his portfolios, but gained Minister of Labour, Minister of Government Services, and Minister of Red Tape Reduction.

On September 17, 2026, Parrott voted to approve the Churchill Falls Definitive Cooperation and Implementation Agreement (DCIA) in the House of Assembly along with the PC caucus.

== Election results ==
=== 2023 leadership election ===
(Voting Held October 4–14, 2023)

= Eliminated from next round
= Winner

Point allocation by ballot
Candidate	Ballot 1	Ballot 2
Name	Votes	Votes
Tony Wakeham	1,816; 45.4%	2,091; 52.0%
Eugene Manning	1,636; 40.9%	1,909; 48.0%
Lloyd Parrott	548; 13.7%	Eliminated
Total Points	4,000.00	4,000.00

=== Provincial elections ===
2025 Newfoundland and Labrador general election: Terra Nova
Party	Candidate	Votes	%	±%
Progressive Conservative	Lloyd Parrott	3,875	66.7%	+13.5
Liberal	Greg French	1,704	29.3%	-14.26
New Democratic	Melanie Adams	231	4.0%	+0.76
Total valid votes				
Total rejected ballots				
Turnout				
Eligible voters				
Progressive Conservative hold		Swing		+

2021 Newfoundland and Labrador general election: Terra Nova
Party	Candidate	Votes	%	±%
Progressive Conservative	Lloyd Parrott	2,837	53.20	+5.02
Liberal	Steve Denty	2,323	43.56	+0.09
New Democratic	Anne Marie Anonsen	173	3.24	
Total valid votes		5,333	99.59	
Total rejected ballots		22	0.41	
Turnout		5,355	53.25	
Eligible voters		10,057		
Progressive Conservative hold		Swing		+2.47
Source(s) "Officially Nominated Candidates General Election 2021" (PDF). Elections Newfoundland and Labrador. "NL Election 2021 Report" (PDF).

2019 Newfoundland and Labrador general election
Party	Candidate	Votes	%	±%
Progressive Conservative	Lloyd Parrott	2,876	48.17	+5.39
Liberal	Colin Holloway	2,595	43.47	-0.27
NL Alliance	Barry Moores	499	8.36	
Total valid votes		5,970	99.48	
Total rejected ballots		31	0.52	+0.08
Turnout		6,001	64.25	+6.89
Eligible voters		9,340		
Progressive Conservative gain from Liberal		Swing		+2.83
