= Terra Nova (electoral district) =

Provincial electoral district in Newfoundland and Labrador, Canada

Newfoundland and Labrador electoral district
- Terra Nova in relation to other districts in Newfoundland

Provincial electoral district
- Legislature: Newfoundland and Labrador House of Assembly
MHA
Lloyd Parrott
Progressive Conservative
- District created: 1975
- First contested: 1975
- Last contested: 2025

Demographics
- Population (2011): 14,275
- Electors (2015): 9,913
- Area (km²): 6,125
- Census division: Division No. 7
- Census subdivision(s): Clarenville, Eastport, Glovertown, Happy Adventure, Port Blandford, Salvage, Sandringham, Sandy Cove, St. Brendan's, Terra Nova, Traytown

Terra Nova is a provincial electoral district for the House of Assembly of Newfoundland and Labrador, Canada. In 2011 there were 8,425 eligible voters within the district.

The central Newfoundland district is found on the western shore of Bonavista Bay and Trinity Bay though it excludes the Bonavista Peninsula and includes the national park of same name. While farming and fishing have been traditional mainstays of the economy, tourism has become increasingly popular.

The largest community in this district is Clarenville. It also includes communities on Bonavista Bay from Glovertown south to Port Blandford and the Trinity Bay communities between Clarenville and Southport while it also includes St. Brendan's and Random Island.

== Members of the House of Assembly ==
The district has elected the following members of the House of Assembly:

Assembly	Years	Member	Party
37th	1975–1979	Tom Lush	Liberal
38th	1979–1982	Tom Lush	Liberal
39th	1982–1983	Tom Lush	Liberal
39th	1983–1985	Glenn Greening	Progressive Conservative
40th	1985–1989	Glenn Greening	Progressive Conservative
41st	1989–1993	Glenn Greening	Progressive Conservative
42nd	1993–1996	Kay Young	Liberal
43rd	1996–1999	Tom Lush	Liberal
44th	1999–2003	Tom Lush	Liberal
45th	2003–2007	Paul Oram	Progressive Conservative
46th	2007–2009	Paul Oram	Progressive Conservative
46th	2009–2011	Sandy Collins	Progressive Conservative
47th	2011–2015	Sandy Collins	Progressive Conservative
48th	2015–2019	Colin Holloway	Liberal
49th	2019–2021	Lloyd Parrott	Progressive Conservative
50th	2021–2025	Lloyd Parrott	Progressive Conservative
51st	2025–Present	Lloyd Parrott	Progressive Conservative

== Election results ==
Graph of election results (minor parties that never got 2% of the vote or did not run consistently are omitted) View source data.

2025 Newfoundland and Labrador general election
Party	Candidate	Votes	%	±%
Progressive Conservative	Lloyd Parrott	3,875	66.7%	+13.5
Liberal	Greg French	1,704	29.3%	-14.26
New Democratic	Melanie Adams	231	4.0%	+0.76
Total valid votes				
Total rejected ballots				
Turnout				
Eligible voters				
Progressive Conservative hold		Swing		+

2021 Newfoundland and Labrador general election
Party	Candidate	Votes	%	±%
Progressive Conservative	Lloyd Parrott	2,837	53.20	+5.02
Liberal	Steve Denty	2,323	43.56	+0.09
New Democratic	Anne Marie Anonsen	173	3.24	
Total valid votes		5,333	99.59	
Total rejected ballots		22	0.41	
Turnout		5,355	53.25	
Eligible voters		10,057		
Progressive Conservative hold		Swing		+2.47
Source(s) "Officially Nominated Candidates General Election 2021" (PDF). Elections Newfoundland and Labrador. "NL Election 2021 Report" (PDF).

2019 Newfoundland and Labrador general election
Party	Candidate	Votes	%	±%
Progressive Conservative	Lloyd Parrott	2,876	48.17	+5.39
Liberal	Colin Holloway	2,595	43.47	-0.27
NL Alliance	Barry Moores	499	8.36	
Total valid votes		5,970	99.48	
Total rejected ballots		31	0.52	+0.08
Turnout		6,001	64.25	+6.89
Eligible voters		9,340		
Progressive Conservative gain from Liberal		Swing		+2.83

2015 Newfoundland and Labrador general election
Party	Candidate	Votes	%	±%
Liberal	Colin Holloway	2,476	43.74	+29.43
Progressive Conservative	Sandy Collins	2,422	42.78	-20.37
New Democratic	Bert Blundon	763	13.48	-1.21
Total valid votes		5,661	99.56	–
Total rejected ballots		25	0.44	–
Turnout		5,686	57.36	+4.23
Eligible voters		9,913		
Liberal gain from Progressive Conservative		Swing		+24.90
Source: Elections Newfoundland and Labrador

2011 Newfoundland and Labrador general election
Party	Candidate	Votes	%	±%
Progressive Conservative	Sandy Collins	2,785	63.15	+8.12
New Democratic	Robin Brentnall	648	14.69	+7.88
Liberal	Ryan Lane	631	14.31	-23.85
Independent	John Baird	346	7.85	+7.85
Total valid votes		4,410	99.64	–
Total rejected ballots		16	0.36	–
Turnout		4,426	53.13	+2.81
Eligible voters		8,330		
Progressive Conservative hold		Swing		+8.00
Source: Elections Newfoundland and Labrador

Newfoundland and Labrador provincial by-election, November 26, 2009 upon the resignation of Paul Oram
Party	Candidate	Votes	%	±%
Progressive Conservative	Sandy Collins	2,398	55.03	-19.02
Liberal	John Baird	1,663	38.16	+21.28
New Democratic	Robin Brentnall	297	6.81	-0.92
Total valid votes		4,358	99.82	–
Total rejected ballots		8	0.18	–
Turnout		4,366	50.32	-5.39
Eligible voters		8,676		
Progressive Conservative hold		Swing		-20.15
Source: Elections Newfoundland and Labrador

2007 Newfoundland and Labrador general election
Party	Candidate	Votes	%	±%
Progressive Conservative	Paul Oram	3,427	74.05	+21.68
Liberal	Katty Gallant	781	16.88	-27.08
New Democratic	Bill Cashin	358	7.73	+4.06
Independent	Lionel Glover	62	1.34	+1.34
Total valid votes		4,628	99.72	–
Total rejected ballots		13	0.28	–
Turnout		4,641	55.71	-13.51
Eligible voters		8,330		
Progressive Conservative hold		Swing		+24.38
Source: Elections Newfoundland and Labrador

2003 Newfoundland and Labrador general election
Party	Candidate	Votes	%	±%
Progressive Conservative	Paul Oram	3,114	52.37	+19.25
Liberal	Tom Lush	2,614	43.96	-22.92
New Democratic	Herbert Ralph	218	3.67	+3.67
Total valid votes		5,946	99.80	–
Total rejected ballots		12	0.20	–
Turnout		5,958	69.22	+15.06
Eligible voters		8,608		
Progressive Conservative gain from Liberal		Swing		+21.09
Source: Elections Newfoundland and Labrador

1999 Newfoundland general election
Party	Candidate	Votes	%	±%
Liberal	Tom Lush	3,514	66.88	+0.57
Progressive Conservative	Rob Stead	1,740	33.12	-0.57
Total valid votes		5,254	99.75	–
Total rejected ballots		13	0.25	–
Turnout		5,267	54.16	-11.19
Eligible voters		9,725		
Liberal hold		Swing		+0.57
Source: Elections Newfoundland and Labrador

1996 Newfoundland general election
Party	Candidate	Votes	%	±%
Liberal	Tom Lush	4,049	66.31	+9.54
Progressive Conservative	Glenn Greening	2,057	33.69	-6.68
Total valid votes		6,106	99.74	–
Total rejected ballots		16	0.26	–
Turnout		6,122	65.35	-4.85
Eligible voters		9,368		
Liberal hold		Swing		+8.11
Source: Elections Newfoundland and Labrador

1993 Newfoundland general election
Party	Candidate	Votes	%	±%
Liberal	Kay Young	3,235	56.77	+12.54
Progressive Conservative	Glenn Greening	2,300	40.37	-14.13
New Democratic	Kevin Muggridge	163	2.86	+1.59
Total valid votes		5,698	99.72	–
Total rejected ballots		16	0.28	–
Turnout		5,714	70.20	-8.32
Eligible voters		8,140		
Liberal gain from Progressive Conservative		Swing		+13.34
Source: Elections Newfoundland and Labrador

1989 Newfoundland general election
Party	Candidate	Votes	%	±%
Progressive Conservative	Glenn Greening	2,920	54.50	-1.53
Liberal	Ray Goulding	2,370	44.23	+3.06
New Democratic	Randy Miller	68	1.27	+1.27
Total valid votes		5,358	99.85	–
Total rejected ballots		8	0.15	–
Turnout		5,366	78.52	+4.29
Eligible voters		6,834		
Progressive Conservative hold		Swing		-2.30
Source: Elections Newfoundland and Labrador

1985 Newfoundland general election
Party	Candidate	Votes	%	±%
Progressive Conservative	Glenn Greening	2,857	56.03	+0.65
Liberal	Everett Cross	2,099	41.17	+1.51
Independent	Gordon W. Genge	143	2.80	+2.80
Total valid votes		5,099	99.73	–
Total rejected ballots		14	0.27	–
Turnout		5,113	74.23	-3.75
Eligible voters		6,888		
Progressive Conservative hold		Swing		+1.08
Source: Elections Newfoundland and Labrador

Newfoundland provincial by-election, December 7, 1983 upon the resignation of Tom Lush
Party	Candidate	Votes	%	±%
Progressive Conservative	Glenn Greening	2,671	55.38	+7.49
Liberal	Paul Thoms	1,913	39.66	-12.45
New Democratic	Peter Fenwick	239	4.96	+4.96
Total valid votes		4,823	99.75	–
Total rejected ballots		12	0.25	–
Turnout		4,835	77.98	+1.80
Eligible voters		6,200		
Progressive Conservative gain from Liberal		Swing		+9.97
Source: Elections Newfoundland and Labrador

1982 Newfoundland general election
Party	Candidate	Votes	%	±%
Liberal	Tom Lush	2,455	52.11	-7.84
Progressive Conservative	Glenn Greening	2,256	47.89	+10.79
Total valid votes		4,711	99.75	–
Total rejected ballots		12	0.25	–
Turnout		4,723	76.18	+6.65
Eligible voters		6,200		
Liberal hold		Swing		-9.32
Source: Elections Newfoundland and Labrador

1979 Newfoundland general election
Party	Candidate	Votes	%	±%
Liberal	Tom Lush	2,579	59.95	+6.89
Progressive Conservative	Glenn Greening	1,596	37.10	+10.29
New Democratic	Lowell Paulson	127	2.95	+2.95
Total valid votes		4,302	99.79	–
Total rejected ballots		9	0.21	–
Turnout		4,311	69.53	+1.09
Eligible voters		6,200		
Liberal hold		Swing		+8.59
Source: Elections Newfoundland and Labrador

1975 Newfoundland general election
Party	Candidate	Votes	%	±%
Liberal	Tom Lush	2,116	53.06	
Progressive Conservative	Samuel Saunders	1,069	26.81	
Reform Liberal	Bill Broderick	803	20.13	
Total valid votes		3,988	99.68	–
Total rejected ballots		13	0.32	–
Turnout		4,001	68.44	
Eligible voters		5,846		
Liberal notional gain		Swing		
Source: Elections Newfoundland and Labrador

== See also ==
- List of Newfoundland and Labrador provincial electoral districts
- Canadian provincial electoral districts
