= Sandy Collins (politician) =

Canadian politician

The Honourable Sandy Collins ECNL

Member of the Newfoundland and Labrador House of Assembly for Terra Nova
- In office October 7, 2009 – November 30, 2015
- Preceded by: Paul Oram
- Succeeded by: Colin Holloway

Minister of Tourism, Culture and Recreation, Minister of Child, Youth, and Family services, Minister Responsible for the office of public Engagement, And Minister Responsible for the Workplace Health, Safety and Compensation Commission of Newfoundland and Labrador
- In office May 1, 2014 – December 14, 2015
- Preceded by: Terry French
- Succeeded by: Christopher Mitchelmore

Personal details
- Born: October 6, 1978 (age 48) Gander, Newfoundland and Labrador, Canada
- Party: Progressive Conservative
- Occupation: Teacher, Executive Assistant

Sandy Collins is a former Canadian politician from Newfoundland and Labrador. He represented the district of Terra Nova in the Newfoundland and Labrador House of Assembly from 2009 until 2015. He also served in the provincial cabinet.

Collins entered politics when he won a 2009 by-election in the district of Terra Nova for the Progressive Conservative Party. Following his re-election in the 2011 provincial election he was appointed the Parliamentary Secretary to the Minister of Health and Community Services. He lost re-election in the 2015 provincial election.

== Early life and education ==
Upon finishing high school in 1996, Collins attended Memorial University. He graduated in 2001 with a Bachelor of Arts degree with a double major in Political Science and History. Collins then accepted a one-year teaching position in South Korea and as a result of that experience he returned to university and received a Bachelor of Education degree in 2003. He returned to South Korea after completing his third degree and in 2004 Collins returned to Newfoundland and Labrador to work as Constituency Assistant to Paul Oram.

== Politics ==
Collins is a member of the Progressive Conservative Party and won his seat in a by-election on November 26, 2009 for the district of Terra Nova. In the 2011 provincial election, Collins was easily re-elected, winning over 63% of the popular vote. Following his re-election, Premier Kathy Dunderdale appointed him as the Parliamentary Secretary to the Minister of Health and Community Services.

On May 1, 2014, Collins was appointed Minister of Tourism, Culture and Recreation by Premier Tom Marshall.

He lost re-election in the 2015 provincial election.

== Electoral record ==
2015 Newfoundland and Labrador general election
Party	Candidate	Votes	%	±%
Liberal	Colin Holloway	2476		
Progressive Conservative	Sandy Collins	2422		
NDP	Bert Blundon	763		

2011 Newfoundland and Labrador general election
Party	Candidate	Votes	%	±%
Progressive Conservative	Sandy Collins	2,785	63.15%	–
NDP	Robin Brentnall	648	14.69%	
Liberal	Ryan Lane	631	14.31%	
Independent	John Baird	346	7.85%	

By-Election, November 26, 2009 On the resignation of Paul Oram, October 7, 2009
Party	Candidate	Votes	%	±%
Progressive Conservative	Sandy Collins	2398	55.02%	–
Liberal	John Baird	1663	38.15%	
NDP	Robin Brentnall	297	6.81%	
