= Paul Oram =

Canadian politician

The Honourable Paul Oram ECNL

MHA for Terra Nova
- In office 2003 – October 7, 2009
- Preceded by: Tom Lush
- Succeeded by: Sandy Collins

Minister of Business
- In office October 30, 2007 – July 9, 2009
- Preceded by: Kevin O'Brien
- Succeeded by: Ross Wiseman

Minister of Health and Community Services
- In office July 9, 2009 – October 7, 2009
- Preceded by: Ross Wiseman
- Succeeded by: Jerome Kennedy

Personal details
- Party: Progressive Conservative

Paul Oram is a former Canadian politician. He represented the riding of Terra Nova in the Newfoundland and Labrador House of Assembly from 2003 to 2009. He was a member of the Progressive Conservatives.

On October 7, 2009, Oram resigned as Minister of Health and Community Services and as MHA for Terra Nova, citing personal health reasons.
