= Kathy Dunderdale =

Canadian politician (born 1952)

The Honourable Kathy Dunderdale ECNL
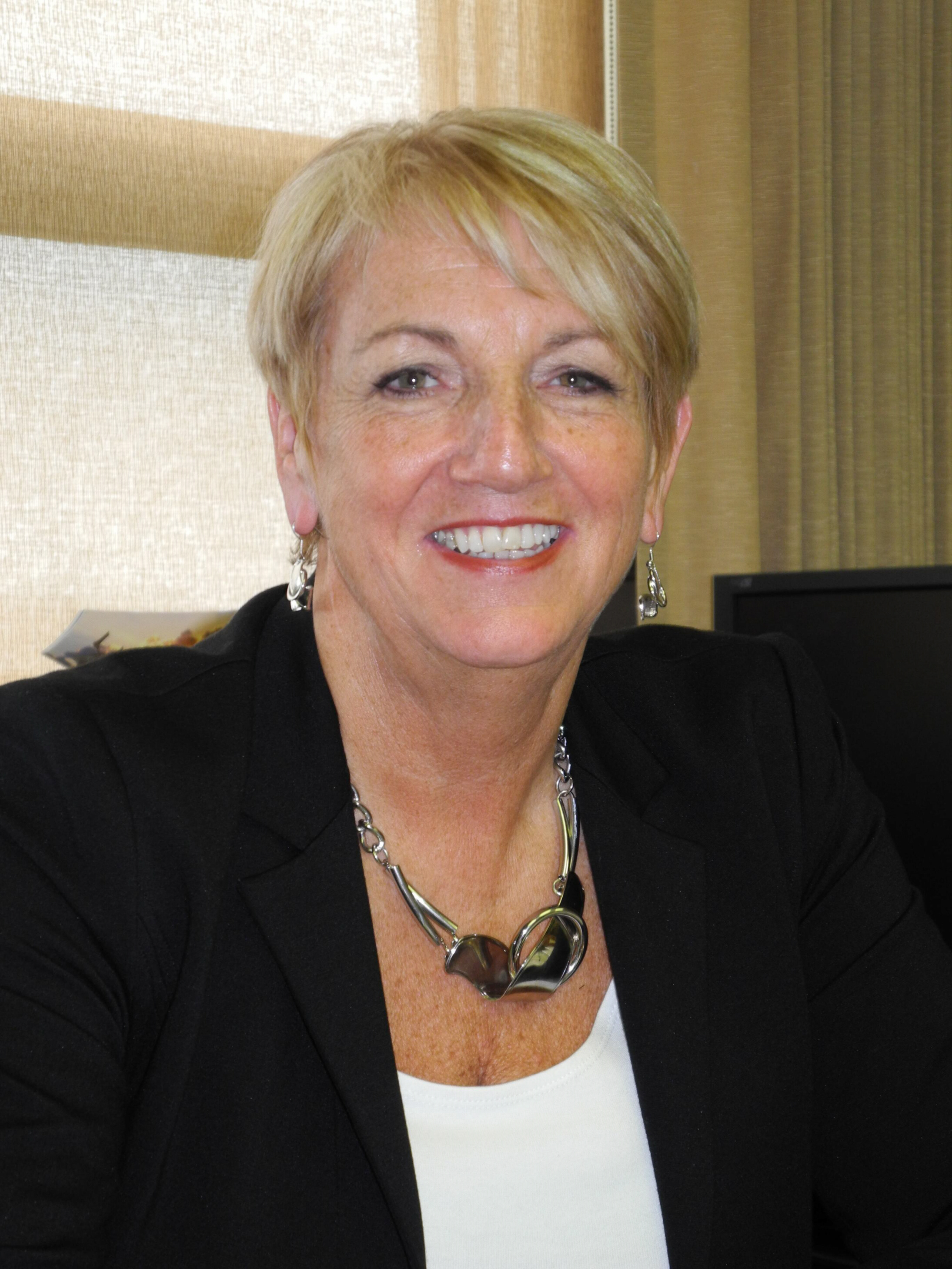

10th Premier of Newfoundland and Labrador
- In office December 3, 2010 – January 24, 2014
- Monarch: Elizabeth II
- Lieutenant Governor: John Crosbie; Frank Fagan
- Preceded by: Danny Williams
- Succeeded by: Tom Marshall

Member of the Newfoundland and Labrador House of Assembly for Virginia Waters
- In office October 21, 2003 – February 28, 2014
- Preceded by: Walter Noel
- Succeeded by: Cathy Bennett

Minister of Natural Resources, Minister Responsible for the Forestry and Agrifoods Agency, And Minister Responsible for the Status of Women of Newfoundland and Labrador
- In office July 5, 2006 – December 6, 2010
- Preceded by: Ed Byrne
- Succeeded by: Shawn Skinner

Deputy Premier of Newfoundland and Labrador
- In office October 31, 2008 – December 3, 2010
- Preceded by: Tom Rideout
- Succeeded by: Steve Kent

Minister of Industry, Innovation, Trade and Rural Development, Minister Responsible for the Research and Development Corporation of Newfoundland and Labrador
- In office November 6, 2003 – July 5, 2006
- Preceded by: Judy Foote
- Succeeded by: Trevor Taylor

Personal details
- Born: Kathleen Mary Margaret Warren; February 1952 (age 74) Burin, Newfoundland, Canada
- Party: Progressive Conservative
- Spouse: Peter Dunderdale (d. 2006)

Kathleen Mary Margaret "Kathy" Dunderdale (née Warren; born February 1952) is a politician and former MHA who served as the tenth premier of Newfoundland and Labrador from December 3, 2010, to January 24, 2014. Dunderdale was born and raised in Burin; before entering politics she worked in the fields of community development, communications, fisheries and social work. Her first foray into politics was as a member of the Burin town council, where she served as deputy mayor. She was also a Progressive Conservative Party (PC) candidate in the 1993 general election and served as President of the PC Party.

In the 2003 general election, Dunderdale was elected as Member of the House of Assembly (MHA) for Virginia Waters. She was re-elected as MHA in the 2007 and 2011 general elections and resigned her post on February 28, 2014. She served in the cabinets of Danny Williams—at various times holding the portfolios of Innovation, Trade and Rural Development, Natural Resources and Deputy Premier—where she developed a reputation as one of the most high-profile members of Williams' cabinets. Dunderdale became premier upon the resignation of Williams, and after becoming the PC leader, she led the party to victory in the October 2011 election. Dunderdale was the first female premier in the province's history and the sixth woman to serve as a premier in the history of Canada.

== Background ==
Kathleen Mary Margaret Warren was born and raised in Burin, Newfoundland and Labrador by her mother Alice and father Norman; she was one of 11 children. Dunderdale received a High School diploma in 1970. After attending Memorial University of Newfoundland for social work, she dropped out of university to get married. She met her late husband, Captain Peter Dunderdale, in 1972 while she was home from university for the summer. Captain Dunderdale was a British master mariner whose boat was in dry dock undergoing repairs. The couple had a son, Tom, and daughter, Sarah, together and Dunderdale was a stay-at-home mom during their formative years, while her husband sailed the world. When her children grew older, she worked away from home in many different volunteer roles.

In the early 1980s, Dunderdale was on an action committee that successfully lobbied Fishery Products International to reverse a decision to shut down its Burin fish plant. The committee was successful and the plant remains in operation. She worked as a social worker with the provincial Department of Social Services, and accepted an offer to be part of an appeals board for inshore fishers after the cod moratorium.

Dunderdale served on the Burin town council and worked with an array of organizations, including the local school board and the Status of Women. She was president of the Progressive Conservative Party of Newfoundland and Labrador, and, after her husband retired from the sea and her children moved away for university, she became heavily involved in the consulting company her husband had started. She help found Women in Resource Development Corporation (WRDC) in 1997, an organization that works to get women involved in the trades and technology sector in Newfoundland and Labrador.

In 1995, she and her husband moved to St. John's, where Dunderdale currently lives within her district of Virginia Waters. Her husband was diagnosed with prostate cancer and died in 2006 at age 56.

== Politics ==
Dunderdale was elected to the Burin town council in 1985, and served as deputy mayor from 1989 to 1993. She got involved in the provincial Federation of Municipalities, she served as their first female president and is the organization's only honorary member, Dunderdale was also director of the Canadian Federation of Municipalities.

Dunderdale was the Progressive Conservative Candidate in the district of Fortune-Hermitage in the 1993 provincial election. Dunderdale ran against Liberal cabinet minister Oliver Langdon, and while she knew she would not win the election she felt she had to send premier Clyde Wells a message about the way he was treating municipalities. In the 1995 Progressive Conservative leadership election Dunderdale served as co-chair of Lynn Verge's successful campaign.

=== MHA and minister ===
Dunderdale was elected to the Newfoundland and Labrador House of Assembly in the 2003 general election defeating Liberal cabinet minister Walter Noel by 1,835 votes, taking 58 percent of the popular vote. Following the election she was brought into cabinet as Minister of Innovation, Trade and Rural Development, and Minister Responsible for the Rural Secretariat.

In a July 5, 2006 cabinet shuffle, Williams appointed Dunderdale as the Minister of Natural Resources and the Minister Responsible for the Forestry and Agrifoods Agency. She was re-elected in the 2007 general election taking 73% of the popular vote against three other candidates. Dunderdale remained as Natural Resources Minister following the 2007 election and on October 31, 2008, Williams appointed her to serve as Deputy Premier and Minister Responsible for the Status of Women, while continuing to serve in her previous portfolios.

From February 1, 2010 to March 15, 2010, Dunderdale assumed the duties as acting Premier of Newfoundland and Labrador, while Williams took a leave of absence to undergo heart surgery in Florida.

=== Minister of Natural Resources ===
During her time as the Minister of Natural Resources, she negotiated and signed several multibillion-dollar development deals.

On August 20, 2008, Dunderdale, Premier Williams and a consortium of oil companies led by Chevron Canada signed a deal to develop the Hebron oil field. The Hebron oil field is the second largest oil field off the coast of the province with an estimated 700 million barrels of oil reserves. The province expects to gain at least $20 billion in royalties and up to 3,500 jobs from the project. Less than a year later, on June 16, 2009, the government announced they had negotiated an agreement with oil companies to expand the Hibernia oil field. The province negotiated a 10 percent equity stake in the "Hibernia South" extension, and it is projected to add $13 billion to the province's coffers.

On November 18, 2010, Dunderdale and Premier Williams were joined by Nova Scotia Premier Darrell Dexter in announcing a $6.2 billion agreement to develop the first phase of the Lower Churchill Project. Nalcor Energy, a Newfoundland and Labrador Crown corporation, signed a partnership agreement with Emera Inc. of Nova Scotia to develop the 824 megawatts Muskrat Falls. The hydro development would see power from the falls transferred from Labrador to the island of Newfoundland via an underwater transmission link through the Strait of Belle Isle. Another underwater transmission link across the Gulf of St. Lawrence would bring power to Nova Scotia. Newfoundland and Labrador will use 40 percent of the hydro power itself and will be able to shut down the oil-burning Holyrood Thermal Generating Station. Emera Inc. will get 20% of the power for $1.2 billion to sell to customers in Nova Scotia. The remaining 40 percent will be sold by Nalcor Energy to markets in Atlantic Canada and the Northeastern United States.

== Premier ==
On December 3, 2010, Dunderdale was sworn in as Newfoundland and Labrador's tenth Premier, taking over for Williams who retired from politics the same day. Dunderdale is the first female Premier in the province's history and only the sixth female in Canada to lead a province or territory. On December 6, 2010, Dunderdale held a minor cabinet shuffle to replace herself as the Minister of Natural Resources. Innovation, Trade and Rural Development Minister Shawn Skinner took over Dunderdale's duties as Minister of Natural Resources and he was replaced by Susan Sullivan.

=== Party leadership ===
After being sworn in as premier, Dunderdale announced that she would not be seeking the leadership of the Progressive Conservative Party and therefore would only serve in the role of premier until a leadership election was held in the spring of 2011. However, on December 17, 2010, Dunderdale announced that she was reconsidering running for the leadership of the party and that she would make a final decision after Christmas.

On December 22, 2010, cabinet ministers Jerome Kennedy and Darin King, who were both seen as likely leadership candidates, announced they would not seek the leadership of the party. Both men said they were encouraging Dunderdale to run and that they would endorse her campaign if she entered the race. On December 23, 2010, Dunderdale garnered support from two other cabinet ministers when Finance Minister Tom Marshall and Municipal Affairs Minister Kevin O'Brien opted out of running for the leadership and threw their support behind her entering the race.

Dunderdale announced her candidacy for the PC Party leadership on December 30, 2010, and was endorsed by her entire caucus. While she originally stated she would step down as premier if she decided to run for the leadership after announcing her candidacy Dunderdale said she will only step down if someone challenges her for the leadership. On January 10, 2011, an hour before nominations were set to close in the leadership election Brad Cabana, a blogger and a former mayor in Saskatchewan, filed his nomination papers becoming Dunderdale's only challenger. The next day however the PC Party's credentials committee announced that Cabana was ineligible to enter the race because he was unable to collect the 50 signatures needed by PC party members to be nominated. Cabana appealed the party's decision but it was announced on January 27, 2011, that the rules committee upheld the previous ruling by the credentials committee. With Cabana being ineligible to run Dunderdale was officially named the leader-designate, she was sworn in as leader at the party's convention on April 2, 2011.

=== 2011 general election ===
On September 19, 2011, Dunderdale met with Lieutenant Governor John Crosbie and requested a dissolution of the 46th General Assembly with an election to follow on October 11, 2011. With an overwhelming lead in public opinion polls, for both Dunderdale and her party, and with roughly $1,000,000 in the bank, pundits considered the election hers to lose. Dunderdale released her party's platform in Grand Falls-Windsor on September 22, 2011. While Dunderdale stressed the need for fiscal restraint, the platform included $135,000,000 in new spending a year. The platform included continuing the freeze on post-secondary tuition and eventually eliminating loans in favour of needs-based grants, phasing out the payroll tax over six years, investing a third of any surplus into unfunded public pension funds, reviewing the province's income tax rates to ensure they are progressive and competitive, continuing to make payments on the province's direct debt, creating a population growth strategy, moving forward with the Muskrat Falls hydro development, and improving health care wait times.

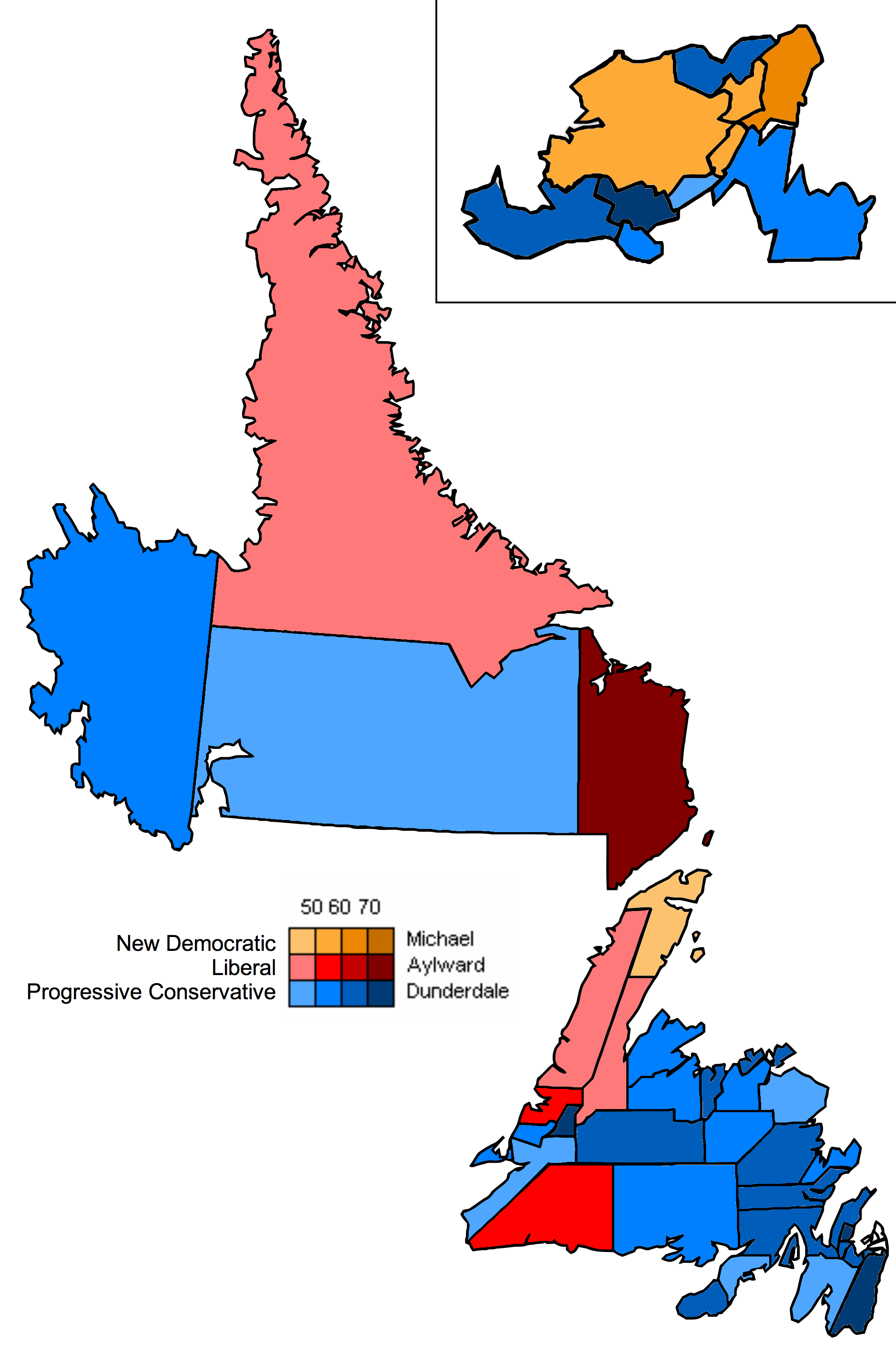
Map showing the partisan support and margins within electoral districts

On election night the Progressive Conservatives won 37 of the province's 48 seats, six fewer seats then the party held before the election. The Liberal Party won six seats, while the NDP were elected in five. With this win Dunderdale became only the third female in Canadian history to lead a party to victory in a general election, after Catherine Callbeck in Prince Edward Island and Pat Duncan in the Yukon.

On October 28, 2011, Dunderdale's new cabinet was sworn in at Government House. Through the elimination and restructuring of government departments she reduced her cabinet to 16 members, including herself, down from 19. Dunderdale created the Department of Advanced Education and Skills, which takes on the majority of the responsibilities of the now defunct Department of Human Resources, Labour and Employment. She eliminated the Department of Business and merged it with the Department of Innovation, Trade and Rural Development to create the Department of Innovation, Business and Rural Development. She also restructured the former departments of Labrador and Aboriginal Affairs and Intergovernmental Affairs to create the Department of Intergovernmental and Aboriginal Affairs.

=== Labour disputes ===
Upon entering the premier's chair, Dunderdale was faced with an ongoing dispute between the province's doctors and government over contract negotiations. In November, 14 doctors announced their resignations over the government's latest offer of a 31 percent wage increase that they felt was not enough. At her swearing in as premier Dunderdale stated that earlier that week she had asked Health Minister Jerome Kennedy and Finance Minister Tom Marshall to meet with the Newfoundland and Labrador Medical Association (NLMA) later that day to work out a resolution to the dispute. After the meeting Dunderdale announced she hoped to have a deal signed with the province's doctors before Christmas.

Dunderdale also announced soon after being sworn in that she wanted to end a year-long strike on the Burin Peninsula that involved 15 home care workers. The government had been called on to settle the dispute but had refused to get involved seeing the workers are not direct employees of provincial government. Within five days of taking office, Dunderdale's government reached an agreement with the workers which they unanimously accepted ending the 377-day strike.

On December 15, 2010, Dunderdale, along with Ministers Kennedy and Marshall, joined the NLMA president to announce that a tentative agreement between the provincial government and doctors had been reached. The offer included 100 percent Atlantic Canadian parity within the first two years of the agreement, pay equity for salaried specialists, and retention bonuses for fee-for-service rural physicians. As a result of the new deal, the 13 of the 14 doctors who tendered their resignations en masse in November rescinded their resignations.

On September 17, 2013, the government announced that a four-year tentative agreement had been reached with the Newfoundland and Labrador Association of Public and Private Employees (NAPE), the province's largest public sector union. The deal between the two was reached after 18 months of negotiations, during at which point NAPE released radio and television advertisements criticizing the government for saying the province's economy was booming while they laid off employees and told unions to expect a modest increase in pay. The tentative deal included a wage freeze during the first two years of the deal, a two per cent increase in pay during year three and a three per cent wage increase in year four. Full-time employees will also receive a $1,400 signing bonus, while temporary, seasonal and part-time workers will get a pro-rated bonus. As well a new job evaluation system would see significant monetary benefits for some employees. Two weeks after reaching an agreement with NAPE, the government announced tentative agreements with the Canadian Union of Public Employees (CUPE) and the Association of Allied Health Professionals (AAHP). Both agreements had a similar structure as the one government reached with NAPE.

=== Energy policy ===
==== Muskrat Falls ====
One of the major focuses of Dunderdale's premiership has been the development of the first phase of the Lower Churchill Project—Muskrat Falls. Several weeks before becoming premier, Dunderdale along with Williams and Premier Dexter of Nova Scotia, signed a partnership agreement to develop the multibillion-dollar hydro development. During her first official meeting with Prime Minister Stephen Harper on February 1, 2011, Dunderdale asked for his government's support with a loan guarantee for Muskrat Falls. The loan guarantee would reduce the cost of the project by millions, resulting in lower electricity rates for consumers. Dunderdale's first throne speech as premier was read out by Lieutenant Governor Crosbie on March 21, 2011, and there was significant focus placed on the Lower Churchill development. During a campaign stop in St. John's during the 2011 federal election Dunderdale endorsed Harper and his Conservative Party while Harper committed to the loan guarantee. On August 19, 2011, Canada's Natural Resources Minister Joe Oliver announced a Memorandum of Agreement for the loan guarantee. While Oliver stated the loan guarantee would be in place by the end of November 2011, it was not until November 30, 2012 that the loan guarantee was finalized. In a simultaneous news conference held in St. John's and Halifax on December 17, 2012, Dunderdale and Emera Inc. announced they had both officially sanctioned the Muskrat Falls hydro development.

==== Nation energy plan ====
During her time as Natural Resources Minister, Dunderdale promoted the need for a national energy plan, which would include an east-west power grid spanning the country. At the Council of the Federation meeting in July 2012, Dunderdale was selected as one of three premiers to help draft a national energy strategy on behalf of the Council. At the same meeting she compared a conflict between British Columbia Premier Christy Clark and Alberta Premier Allison Redford, regarding the Northern Gateway pipeline, to the conflicts Newfoundland and Labrador has had dealing with the province of Quebec regarding hydroelectricity. Dunderdale was one of the few premiers to wade into that conflict and stated that "I don't agree that provinces should be able to use their geographical location to hold off economic development for their sister provinces - that's not in the best interests of the country". She went on to say that there would need to be difficult conversations but that they are needed to find resolutions that work for all.

=== Education ===
As part of a reorganization of government departments, the post-secondary education portfolio was removed from the Department of Education and became part of the new Department of Advanced Education and Skills. Along with post-secondary education the new department would be responsible for apprentices, advanced studies and take over much of the responsibilities of the former Department of Human Resources, Labour and Employment. The Department of Education would be responsible for K-12 education, early childhood learning and the province's libraries.

==== K-12 education ====
As part of the 2013 budget, the Dunderdale government announced that the province's four English school boards would be consolidated into one, while the one French school board would remain as is. The number of school boards in the province had been reduced in 2004, from 10 boards to five. Since that time, student enrolment in Newfoundland and Labrador had declined by 14,000, or 17 per cent. The government faced criticism for the amalgamation from people in the education system but despite this Minister Clyde Jackman announced the appointment of a transition team for the amalgamation on April 24, 2013, with a plan to have the new school board in place for September of that year. The budget also saw reductions in the Department of Education that would affect areas such as administration, learning resources support and district-based numeracy supports. However, the minister said there would be no reduction in the allocation of regular classroom teachers, and Jackman stated that Newfoundland and Labrador had the best student-teacher ratio in the country.

==== Post-secondary education ====
Since 2003, the Progressive Conservative government have froze tuition fees at the province's public post-secondary institutions, the freeze has led to the province having the lowest tuition fees in the country. In her party's 2011 election platform Dunderdale announced that a re-elected PC government would continue with the tuition freeze and would gradually phase out student loans and replace them with up-front needs-based grants.

The 2013 provincial budget included a 10-year sustainability plan, which announced that in 2014 the government would review both Memorial University and the College of the North Atlantic (CNA). However, the 2013 budget did include a $15 million budget cut to CNA and changes to the college's programming. The budget announced that the Adult Basic Education (ABE) program - a high school equivalency program designed for adults who did not complete high school - would be removed from the CNA curriculum and be privatized. The program is already administered through the private sector and through non-profit organizations, with the government stating that only 40 per cent of people enrolled in ABE attended CNA. In a letter to the editor, Advanced Education and Skills Minister Joan Shea wrote "it costs approximately $5,000 more to provide ABE to a student at College of the North Atlantic than at a private school, and the average cost of ABE per student in this province is about three times the cost in other Atlantic provinces." College of the North Atlantic President and CEO also announced the elimination of a number of programs at campuses where there was low enrolment. Vaughan later announced the addition of new programs that are considered in demand.

=== Fiscal policy ===
During Danny Williams' time as premier, the province experienced a major economic expansion, mainly as a result of the offshore oil industry. After years of sluggish growth and annual deficits the province started recording large surpluses, starting in 2006. While billions of dollars were paid down on the province's debt, government spending increased considerably. In his 2011 report Auditor General John Noseworthy noted that spending had increased by 47.4 percent over a five-year period. Finance Minister Tom Marshall defended the spending practises by saying that the province had to play catchup after decades of deficits, and that the global recession forced all governments to hike spending to keep economies afloat.

Despite warnings from Noseworthy to control spending, Dunderdale's first budget saw spending increase by 4.9 percent. Spending was focused on infrastructure, health care, social programs, Nalcor Energy as well as other areas. The budget included tax credits for child care, volunteer fire fighters as well as an 8 percent Residential Energy Rebate on home heating fuel, which is equal to the provincial portion of the Harmonized Sales Tax (HST). The budget raised the threshold on the payroll tax exemption from $1 million to $1.2 million. Despite a $598 million surplus for the previous year and a $59 surplus forecasted for the coming year, the province's net debt was expected to increase from $8.2 billion to $8.67 billion due to unfunded liabilities. However, on November 16, 2011, Dunderdale's government released their Fall economic update and announced that the surplus for the 2011-2012, fiscal year was now projected to be $755.8 million, with the added surplus going towards the debt. In the audited financial statements released in January 2013, the surplus for the 2011-2012 was $882.8 million, with the overall debt falling to $7.8 billion.

At a luncheon with the St. John's Board of Trade in February 2012, Dunderdale delivered a speech which laid out a more fiscally conservative course. She stated that the days of big spending were over and that it was time to reign in public spending. Dunderdale said that there would be virtually no new spending in the upcoming provincial budget, that government departments were told to find savings and that she had ordered an audit of all government programs. She also said that her goal in the next decade is to radically decrease Newfoundland and Labrador's debt load and to achieve the same per capita debt as the Canadian average. Fiscal restraint was again the key message in the March 5, 2011, speech from the throne. The speech announced that all government departments and programs were under review. Dunderdale later stated that her government was looking for $100 million in savings for the upcoming fiscal year and that key services were exempt from cuts.

The 2012 budget was delivered by Finance Minister Marshall on April 24, 2012, and was a stark contrast from the austerity budget that Dunderdale and her ministers had been warning of for months. Only 45 temporary positions were cut from the public service and a review of programs found $38.8 million in savings, much lower than the $100 million Dunderdale had previously mentioned. Government spending actually increased in the budget by 1.7 per cent, though this was below the rate of inflation.

The government estimated that oil would average $124 a barrel for the year but as a result of lower oil production, caused by maintenance of two of the three offshore oil rigs, the province would record a deficit of $258 million. Marshall stated that while he could have eliminated the deficit in one year through cuts, the government decided that they would run a deficit for two years before going back to surpluses. The government also announced that over the next 10 years they would embark on a "core mandate analysis" to restrain growth in program spending to the rate of inflation, and reduce Newfoundland and Labrador's debt level to the all-province average. Just three months after the budget was delivered Dunderdale announced that the government would cut back on travel and leave some vacant positions unfilled due to a drop in oil prices. On the day of her news conference brent crude, a close reference point for oil produced offshore Newfoundland, stood at $103 a barrel, which was up from $90 the previous month. For every $1 drop in the price of oil below government estimates results in nearly $20 million less being funnelled into the provincial treasury, which meant the deficit for the year was expected to climb by several hundred million dollars. By the time Finance Minister Marshall released his mid-year economic update on December 13, 2012, it was estimated that the deficit would total $726 million for that fiscal year.

During this same time, Dunderdale was named the best fiscal performer of Canada's premiers by the Fraser Institute. The institute measured the performance of all premiers for their time in office, which was the 2011-2012 fiscal year for Dunderdale, and looked at their performance on three core components of fiscal policy: government spending, taxes, and debt and deficits. Dunderdale received a score of 71.4 out of a possible 100.0, though the report did mention that her strong performance with regards to government spending was in part due to the province's significant economic growth and not her ability to restrain growth in spending.

On January 16, 2013, Dunderdale held a surprise cabinet shuffle that saw Minister Marshall shuffled out of Finance and appointed as Minister of Natural Resources. He was replaced by Jerome Kennedy, who had served as Natural Resources Minister since October 2011. With contract negotiations underway with public sector unions underway, Minister Kennedy's appointment was called a warning shot to the union leaders by the opposition. Minister Kennedy is considered a tough negotiator; further, he was Minister of Finance in 2008 during the last round of contract negotiations.

Prior to announcing the 2013 provincial budget, Kennedy warned that if expenditures were not brought under control the province could face a $1.6 billion deficit for the coming fiscal year and that the province's debt could increase by $4 billion in three years. These figures were much lower when the budget was brought down on March 26, 2013; however, the Dunderdale government was still projecting a deficit of $563.8 million for the 2013 fiscal year. Roughly 1,200 public sector jobs were eliminated, due to spending cuts totalling over $300 million.

=== Fishery policy ===
During Dunderdale's tenure as premier, the Fisheries portfolio has seen a significant overturn at the ministerial level. In less than three years Dunderdale had appointed her fourth Minister of Fisheries and Aquaculture. Keith Hutchings became that fourth minister after his appointment on October 9, 2013. Following his appointment a representative with the Fish, Food and Allied Workers union said he hoped to see the minister stay in his portfolio for a longer period of time, as he was the seventh minister in the portfolio in ten years. Dunderdale's first Fisheries minister was Clyde Jackman, who had been the minister when Dunderdale succeeded Williams as premier. Jackman remained minister until after the 2011 provincial election, when Darin King took over the portfolio. Eleven months later King was succeeded by Derrick Dalley who was minister for the next year. Opposition parties criticized government after Hutchings appointment saying the overturn in ministers showed that there was no plan for the fishery.

In February 2011, Dunderdale's government rejected a report prepared by an independent committee that called for a massive downsizing of the fishing industry. The report by the Steering Committee for Fishing Industry Memorandum of Understanding (MOU) was released by the province, and called for $450 million to be spent to achieve substantial cuts in the industry. At the time Minister Jackman dismissed the report almost immediately, saying the $450 million price tag was too expensive. Opposition parties and union leaders were highly critical of the government for dismissing the report, with NDP leader Lorraine Michael calling for Minister Jackman to resign.

During the October 2011, provincial election, Dunderdale said "We've got too many people chasing too few fish, and these plants are going to collapse and fail because they're not on sound economic models". She said there was overcapacity in the fishing industry and that fish processing plants would need to close. Minister Jackman, who represents a district that relies heavily on the fishing industry, continued to face much criticism for his performance in the fisheries portfolio and was re-elected by just 40 votes. The day after winning a majority government, Dunderdale stated in an interview that tough decisions were looming in the industry. She again stated there was overcapacity and structural problems in the fishery and that her government was ready to make the tough decisions that were long overdue. Dunderdale swore in her new cabinet weeks after the election and shuffled Jackman to the Department to Education, Darin King succeeded him as the Minister of Fisheries and Aquaculture.

On February 28, 2012, the government announced that they would stop providing funding to the FFAW. In a five-year period, the provincial government had provided roughly $1.3 million in grant money for things like research, seafood marketing and fisheries technology programs. Minister King cited the union's criticism of the provincial government as the reason for the move, stating 'No matter what we do in this province, the FFAW are more concerned with their own self-interest than they are with the interests of the industry.'

==== Minimum processing requirements ====
Fish caught off the coast of Newfoundland and Labrador are required to have a minimal level of processing done in provincial fish plants. The objective is to ensure that the province's fishery generates the maximum economic and employment benefits for the province. These requirements are known as minimum processing requirements, or MPRs. These requirements have been an issue in province over the years for numerous reasons including; the cost of processing, labour availability and because some markets are interested in less processed fish. The Minister of Fisheries and Aquaculture can grant a company exemptions from minimum processing requirements.

In November 2011, provincial government-appointed auditors backed up claims by Ocean Choice International (OCI) that they were losing millions of dollars each year operating the Marystown fish plant. On December 2, 2011, the company announced that they would permanently close their Marystown and Port Union fish processing plants and invest money into other plants throughout the province. The following week, OCI asked the provincial government for an exemption to export unprocessed fish in return for nearly doubling the workforce at the company's plant in Fortune. Minister King reacted positively to the proposed idea and said the government would consider it. Negotiations on a deal would become tense, with the minister criticizing the company for using 'pressure tactics' to try to get a deal. OCI said that they were in damage control all around the world because of Minister King's comments. In February 2012, the government rejected a proposal to drop MPRs for the company, saying that it was not in the best interest of the province. In mid-October 2012, workers at the Fortune fish plant voted unanimously in favour of allowing OCI to ship out raw fish to China for processing, in return for 110 full-time jobs at their plant. The FFAW, which represented the workers, opposed the move to ship out the raw product. Dunderdale held a cabinet shuffle on October 19, 2012, and appointed Tourism Minister Derrick Dalley as the new Minister of Fisheries and Aquaculture. In a news conference held on December 21, 2012, Minister Dalley announced the government would allow Ocean Choice International to ship 75 per cent of its yellowtail flounder quota overseas for processing, along with 100 per cent of its redfish quota. In return a total of 236 year-round jobs, between the Fortune fish plant and on company vessels at sea, for at least five years.

===== CETA =====
Minimum processing requirements also became an issue in the Canada-European Union Comprehensive Economic Trade Agreement (CETA). Dunderdale announced in a speech to the St. John's Board of Trade in May 2013, that the loan guarantee for the Muskrat Falls project nearly fell apart because of MPRs. She said that the federal government tried to pressure her into eliminating MPRs at the eleventh hour of the loan guarantee negotiations to help secure the trade deal. Dunderdale said that while she was willing to look at minimum processing requirements, she was not willing to tie it to the loan guarantee.

On October 18, 2013, Charlene Johnson, the minister responsible for trade, along with Fisheries minister Keith Hutchings announced that the government supported the agreement in principle for CETA, that had been announced early that day. The ministers said the trade agreement would a game changer for the fishing industry. The agreement would eliminate MPRs for the European Union three years after the ratification of the deal, which is expected to occur in 2015. In return for eliminating minimum processing requirement, high tariffs and import restrictions on almost all fish would be eliminated on the first day that CETA comes into effect. Currently only 13.1 per cent of seafood is duty-free. But by 2022, all seafood would be 100 per cent duty-free. Following the conclusion of the CETA negotiations Dunderdale said that other provinces and the federal government had been pressuring her to accept a deal that would eliminate minimum processing requirements on fish right away, in exchange for concessions on tariffs later. Dunderdale said they refused that deal and were eventually able to negotiate the current arrangement. Her government also felt that eliminating MPRs was a safe trade away because they did not feel European countries could compete with Newfoundland and Labrador fish plants, due to higher operating costs in those countries.

On October 29, 2013, Dunderdale held a major news conference regarding the fishery at The Rooms in St. John's. Along with cabinet ministers and industry officials, Dunderdale announced that the federal and provincial governments would be investing $400 million, over three years, into the fishery. The federal government portion of the money totalled $280 million while the provincial portion was $120 million. The money is compensation for the province eliminating minimum processing requirements for the European Union. Although the premier said that her government plans to work with industry officials on how the money would be spent, she said it would be invested into such things as research and development, new marketing initiatives and infrastructure.

=== Access to information ===
==== Bill 29 ====
In June 2012, Dunderdale's government brought forth controversial legislation, known as Bill 29, that reformed the province's Access to Information and Protection of Privacy Act. The amendments to the act expanded the government's ability to deny access to information by keeping ministerial briefings secret, ignoring requests for information that cabinet ministers deem to be "frivolous," and barring the auditor general from a wider array of records. Deadlines to respond to requests were pushed back, and fees were increased from $15 to $25. The opposition leaders immediately condemned the bill and said they would team up to filibuster the bill. An expert on international access-to-information laws, Toby Mendel, called key changes to the act "breathtaking," and said the province will rank lower than some third world countries with the new legislation. As well 75 people also assembled outside the Confederation Building to protest the bill. However, Newfoundland and Labrador's information commissioner, Ed Ring, said bill 29 was not a bad thing and that it would not stop the Access to the Information and Protection of Privacy Act from doing its job. Bill 29 led to a four-day filibuster in the House of Assembly, which eventually ended when the government invoked closure to the debate. NDP leader Lorraine Michael's accusation that the government was being racist, when referring to Mendel's criticism of the bill, was cited by the government as reasons to end debate.

On September 13, 2012, long time Tory MHA and former cabinet minister Tom Osborne announced he was leaving the PC Party to sit as an independent. He cited Dunderdale's leadership as the reason for his defection and said that the turning point for him was the debate over Bill 29. Osborne said that while he voted in favour of the new legislation, he did not support it. On October 19, 2012, Dunderdale shuffled her cabinet and Justice Minister Felix Collins, who was responsible for Bill 29, was shuffled out of the Justice portfolio and became Minister of Intergovernmental and Aboriginal Affairs. Though the portfolio change was considered to be a demotion Dunderdale stated that Collins' handling of Bill 29 was not connected to his move. At the time of the cabinet shuffle Dunderdale also created the Office of Public Engagement, which will bring together different departments to aid in communications efforts. The new office will also be responsible for access to information.

==== Office of Public Engagement ====
The Office of Public Engagement was established on October 19, 2012, and includes the Rural Secretariat, the Voluntary and Non-Profit Secretariat, the Youth Engagement office, the Strategic Partnership Initiative, and the Access to Information and Protection of Privacy Office. Innovation, Business and Rural Development Minister Keith Hutchings was appointed as the minister responsible for the office, while Steve Kent was appointed parliamentary secretary for the office. Several days after his appointment Hutchings announced that the government was looking at putting restaurant inspection reports online for the public viewing. The Canadian Broadcasting Corporation (CBC) had spent $457 obtaining inspection reports earlier the year, which had been criticized by former Service NL Minister Paul Davis during the debate on Bill 29. On November 22, 2012, Hutchings and Service NL Minister Nick McGrath announced that the public could now go on the government's website and see recent health and sanitation inspection reports for restaurants. While both opposition parties agreed with the government's decision to make the reports available online, Liberal MHA Andrew Parsons said that "I have no doubt that this is a response to the Bill 29 criticism".

A CBC investigation, intended to test access to information following Bill 29, discovered that some departments and agencies were refusing to release previously available details about how much public employees take home above their base salaries. When the media was briefed on Bill 29 the-then Deputy Minister of Justice, Donald Burrage, said that the provisions of the act which enabled the public to see bonuses offered to public service employees had not been changed. Minister Hutchings confirmed that only the base salary, or a salary range, plus a range of possible bonuses, are now available. However, he said that this was not a change due to Bill 29 and that the information on salaries is only voluntary.

=== Personal security ===
On February 7, 2011, the premier's office announced that due to several incidents since Dunderdale became premier in December that police bodyguards were protecting her. After her office contacted the Royal Newfoundland Constabulary (RNC) to report the incidents the RNC felt it was necessary to take precaution and assign security to the premier. Dunderdale spoke on the issue the following day, she said that due to privacy reasons she was partially reluctant to take on a bodyguard but respects the RNC's decision. Dunderdale also said that the police had asked her not to comment on the issue and therefore she would stay mum about what led to the need for security.

=== Public opinion ===
During her premiership support for Dunderdale, her government and the PC Party saw a steady decline. A Corporate Research Associates (CRA) poll released days after Dunderdale became premier, and conducted before she took office, showed that 90 per cent of the population were satisfied with the PC government. 75 per cent would vote for the Progressive Conservative Party in an election and 76 percent chose Williams as the best leader to be premier. A CRA poll conducted throughout February 2011, showed that support for Dunderdale, her government and the PC Party remained high. Satisfaction with government was at 82 per cent, while 73 per cent of respondents said they would vote for the PC Party in an election. 64 per cent of respondents stated Dunderdale was the best choice for premier, compared to 18 per cent for Liberal leader Yvonne Jones and 5 per cent for Lorraine Michael. An Angus Reid Public Opinion (Angus Reid) poll conducted around the same time listed Dunderdale as the second most popular premier in Canada with a 55 percent approval rating. 10 percent of respondents disapproved of her performance while 35 percent were not sure if they approved or disapproved of her performance.

By the time the provincial election was called in September 2011, support for Dunderdale, her government and the Progressive Conservatives had fallen in public opinion polls. However, her party entered the campaign with support levels in the high fifties and Dunderdale remained the top choice for premier. On October 11, 2011, Dunderdale led her party to victory winning 56 per cent of the popular vote, which was consistent with polling throughout the campaign. After an initial bounce in the polls following the election, support for Dunderdale would decline right up until her resignation as premier in 2014. Throughout 2012, Dunderdale saw her personal numbers take a big hit, while PC Party support and government satisfaction would also decline. In November 2012, 36 per cent of respondents to a CRA poll thought Dunderdale was the best choice for premier, down from 59 per cent a year earlier. Although the Progressive Conservatives still remained in first place their support had fallen 14 points over the year to 46 per cent. While government satisfaction had fallen it remained high, with 58 percent of respondents either being completely or mostly satisfied. An Angus Reid poll released in December 2012, also showed declining support for Dunderdale over the year. Just 37 per cent of those polled approved of the job Dunderdale was doing as premier, while 55 per cent disapproved.

In March 2013, a CRA poll showed that the Progressive Conservatives had fallen below the NDP, with 39 per cent indicating they supported the New Democrats and 38 per cent supporting the PC Party. The Liberal Party were third with 22 per cent support. Michael also surpassed Dunderdale when asked who would make the best premier, Michael was at 33 per cent and Dunderdale was at 32 per cent. This was also the first poll to show that more people were dissatisfied with government's performance then satisfied. An Angus Reid poll released on April 8, 2013, rating the performance of provincial premiers, showed that Dunderdale was the most unpopular premier in the country. Her approval rating was tied with British Columbia's Christy Clark at 25 per cent, while 73 per cent of respondents said they disapproved of Dunderdale's performance as premier.

A CRA poll conducted throughout May 2013 continued to show declining support for Dunderdale, her government, and the PC Party. Only 21 per cent of those surveyed felt Dunderdale was the best choice for premier, behind both Michael and Ball. Dissatisfaction with her government increased to 65 per cent, compared to 33 per cent who indicated they were dissatisfied a year earlier. Support for the Progressive Conservatives also fell to just 27 per cent. This was below both the NDP and Liberals who were statistically tied for first, at 37 per cent and 36 per cent respectively. The poll also showed that 35 per cent of respondents were undecided or did not plan to vote, a significant increase from 14 per cent in November 2011. Towards the end of 2013, satisfaction for the Dunderdale administration saw a significant increase, though support for her and the PC Party saw little change from the poll in May. According to a November CRA poll, satisfaction with the Dunderdale government was up 10 points from May to 42 per cent, while dissatisfaction was at 52 per cent. A quarter of decided voters thought Dundedale was the best choice for premier, this was above Michael but 14 points below Ball. Due to a large drop in NDP support, down to 19 percent, the PC Party moved back into second place with 29 per cent of decided voters indicating that they would vote for the party in an election. The Liberal Party opened up a wide lead with 52 per cent of decided voters saying they would vote for the party in an election.

=== Resignation ===
On January 22, 2014, and initially reported by media outlets the day before, Dunderdale announced that she would be resigning as Premier on January 24, 2014. In her speech Dunderdale stated "Just as you know when it's time to step up, you also know when it is time to step back, and that time for me is now." The announcement followed the defection of PC MHA Paul Lane to the Liberal Party, and months of poor performance in opinion polls. Dunderdale's Finance Minister Tom Marshall was sworn in as premier and became the interim party leader on January 24. Marshall will hold the post until the PC Party selects a permanent leader. On February 28, 2014, Dunderdale sent out a news releasing announcing she was resigning as the MHA for Virginia Water by the end of the day, ending a ten and a half year career in provincial politics. She subsequently returned to community work gaining employment with Gathering Place as their volunteer coordinator.

== Electoral record ==
Virginia Waters - 2011 Newfoundland and Labrador general election
Party	Candidate	Votes	%	±%
Progressive Conservative	Kathy Dunderdale	3,370	60.03%	-13.01
NDP	Dave Sullivan	1,708	30.42%	+17.59
Liberal	Sheila Miller	536	9.55%	+1.8

Virginia Waters - 2007 Newfoundland and Labrador general election
Party	Candidate	Votes	%	±%
Progressive Conservative	Kathy Dunderdale	4043	73.04%	+14.94%
NDP	David Sullivan	710	12.83%	+3.6%
Liberal	Drew Brown	429	7.75%	-24.92%
Independent	Fred Wilcox	353	6.38%	+6.38%

Virginia Waters - 2003 Newfoundland and Labrador general election
Party	Candidate	Votes	%	±%
Progressive Conservative	Kathy Dunderdale	4193	58.10%	+21.77%
Liberal	Walter Noel	2358	32.67%	-14.76%
NDP	David Sullivan	666	9.23%	-4.92%
