= Roland Butler =

Canadian politician

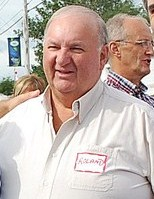

MHA for Port de Grave
- In office 2001 – September 19, 2011
- Preceded by: John Efford
- Succeeded by: Glenn Littlejohn

Personal details
- Born: January 31, 1945
- Died: December 11, 2025 (Age 80)
- Party: Liberal

Roland Butler (January 31, 1945-December 11, 2025) was a Canadian politician. He represented the district of Port de Grave in the Newfoundland and Labrador House of Assembly from 2001 to 2011.

Butler attended Coley's Point High School before going on to complete a Business Administration Program.

He was a member of the Liberal Party. From 1974 to 1984, he held a number of positions in the Port de Grave District Liberal Association, including Vice-president and Secretary. He was one of only three Liberal candidates elected in 2007 provincial election. Butler announced in April 2010, that he would not seek re-election in the 2011 provincial election. After leaving politics, he had suggested that he may write a book about the 2001 leadership race. He had a wife, a son, and two grandsons.
