= Ross Wiseman =

Canadian politician

The Honourable Ross Wiseman ECNL

Minister of Finance
- In office September 5, 2014 – December 14, 2015
- Preceded by: Charlene Johnson
- Succeeded by: Cathy Bennett

Member of the Newfoundland and Labrador House of Assembly for Trinity North
- In office 2000 – November 5, 2015
- Preceded by: Doug Oldford
- Succeeded by: District Abolished

Speaker of the Newfoundland and Labrador House of Assembly
- In office October 27, 2011 – September 5, 2014
- Preceded by: Roger Fitzgerald
- Succeeded by: Wade Verge

Minister of Environment and Conservation of Newfoundland and Labrador
- In office January 13, 2011 – October 28, 2011
- Preceded by: Charlene Johnson
- Succeeded by: Terry French

Minister of Business of Newfoundland and Labrador
- In office 2009–2011
- Preceded by: Paul Oram
- Succeeded by: Derrick Dalley

Minister of Health and Community Services of Newfoundland and Labrador
- In office 2007–2009
- Preceded by: Tom Osborne
- Succeeded by: Paul Oram

Personal details
- Born: 1953 (age 72–73) Come By Chance, Newfoundland, Canada
- Party: Progressive Conservative Party (2001-Present)
- Other political affiliations: Liberal Party of Newfoundland and Labrador (2000-2001)
- Occupation: Health Care Administrator

Alfred Ross Robert Martin Wiseman is a Canadian politician from Newfoundland and Labrador. Wiseman represented the district of Trinity North in the Newfoundland and Labrador House of Assembly from 2000 to 2015, as a member of the Progressive Conservative Party.

Wiseman served in the provincial cabinet as Minister of Finance, President of the Treasury Board, Minister of Environment and Conservation, Minister of Business and Minister of Health and Community Services. He also served as Speaker of the House of Assembly from 2011 to 2014. Prior to entering cabinet he was the Parliamentary Secretary to the Minister of Health and Community Services.

== Politics ==
Wiseman was elected as the member of the House of Assembly (MHA) for the district of Trinity North on April 25, 2000. Originally elected as a member of the governing Liberal Party, Wiseman announced in September 2001 that he was crossing the floor to join the Progressive Conservative caucus.

Wiseman was appointed to cabinet in January 2007 as Minister of Health and Community Services. In a minor cabinet shuffle in 2009, he became Minister of Business. On January 13, 2011, Premier Kathy Dunderdale shuffled the cabinet, and Wiseman became Minister of Environment and Conservation.

Following his re-election in the October 2011, election Wiseman was uncontested for the role of Speaker of the House of Assembly.

On September 5, 2014, Wiseman was named Minister of Finance by outgoing premier Tom Marshall. He retained the portfolio when Paul Davis took over as premier later that month.

On July 30, 2015, Wiseman announced that he was leaving politics and would not run in the 2015 election.

== Electoral record ==
Trinity North - 2011 Newfoundland and Labrador general election
Party	Candidate	Votes	%	±%
Progressive Conservative	Ross Wiseman	3,211	66.87	–
NDP	Vanessa Wiseman	1,247	25.97	
Liberal	Brad Cabana	344	7.16	

2007 Newfoundland and Labrador general election
Party	Candidate	Votes	%	±%
Progressive Conservative	Ross Wiseman	3939	82.15	–
Liberal	Kathryn Small	609	12.7	
NDP	Janet Stringer	247	5.15	

2003 Newfoundland and Labrador general election
Party	Candidate	Votes	%	±%
Progressive Conservative	Ross Wiseman	4,126	67.57	–
Liberal	Kathryn Small	1,640	26.85	
NDP	Howard W. Duffett	340	5.56	

By-election: April 25, 2000 On the resignation of Doug Oldford
Party	Candidate	Votes	%	±%
Liberal	Ross Wiseman	2,654	48.12	
Progressive Conservative	Bruce Stagg	2,463	44.66	–
NDP	Perry Feltham	398	7.21	
