= Charlene Johnson =

Canadian politician

The Honourable Charlene Johnson ECNL

Minister of Finance, President of the Treasury Board, Minister Responsible for the Human Resource Secretariat, Minister Responsible for the NL liquor corporation, Acting Minister of Health and Community Services, And Minister Responsible for the status of Women of Newfoundland and Labrador
- In office January 29, 2014 – September 5, 2014
- Preceded by: Tom Marshall
- Succeeded by: Ross Wiseman

Member of the Newfoundland and Labrador House of Assembly for Trinity-Bay de Verde
- In office October 21, 2003 – September 5, 2014
- Preceded by: Lloyd Snow
- Succeeded by: Steve Crocker

Minister of Innovation, Business, and Rural Development, Minister Responsible for the office of public Engagement, Minister Responsible for the research and Development Corporation, And Minister Responsible for the Status of Women
- In office October 9, 2013 – January 29, 2014
- Preceded by: Keith Hutchings
- Succeeded by: Terry French (acting)

Minister of Child, Youth and Family Services of Newfoundland and Labrador
- In office January 13, 2011 – October 9, 2013
- Preceded by: Joan Shea
- Succeeded by: Paul Davis

Minister of Environment and Conservation of Newfoundland and Labrador
- In office 2007–2011
- Succeeded by: Ross Wiseman

Personal details
- Born: Carbonear, Newfoundland and Labrador
- Party: Progressive Conservative

Charlene Johnson is a former Canadian politician in Newfoundland and Labrador, Canada. Johnson represented the district of Trinity-Bay de Verde for the Progressive Conservative Party from 2003 to 2014.

Johnson served as a minister in the cabinets of Danny Williams, Kathy Dunderdale and Tom Marshall. During her time in cabinet, she was Minister of the Environment and Conservation, Minister of Child, Youth and Family Services, Minister of Innovation, Business and Rural Development, and Minister of Finance and President of Treasury Board. Johnson is the youngest woman ever elected to the House of Assembly, and the only woman to ever give birth while serving as a Member of the House of Assembly (MHA).

== Background ==
Johnson was born in Carbonear, Newfoundland and Labrador, and raised in the Conception Bay community of Gull Island. She studied at the University of New Brunswick, where she was awarded a Bachelor of Science degree in Forest Engineering. Johnson then obtained a Master of Applied Science degree in Environmental Systems Engineering and Management from Memorial University of Newfoundland.

== Politics ==
In the 2003 provincial election, Johnson became the youngest woman to ever be elected to the Newfoundland and Labrador House of Assembly. Johnson defeated Liberal incumbent Lloyd Snow in the district of Trinity-Bay de Verde, she won 63 percent of the vote compared to Snow's 32 percent. She was re-elected in the 2007 provincial election, taking 72 percent of the vote. Following the election, Premier Danny Williams appointed her Minister of Environment and Conservation.

In April 2009, Johnson became the first MHA in Newfoundland and Labrador, and one of only a handful of women in Canada, to give birth while being a member of a provincial or federal legislature.

Johnson served as the Environment Minister till January 2011, when Premier Kathy Dunderdale appointed her Minister of Child, Youth and Family Services. Later that year she was re-elected, winning 62 percent of the popular. Johnson remained in the portfolio of Child, Youth and Family Services when Dunderdale named her new cabinet several weeks after the election. In October 2013, Johnson was appointed Minister of Innovation, Business and Rural Development. In January 2014, she was named Minister of Finance and President of Treasury Board replacing Tom Marshall who had become premier.

In September 2014, Johnson announced she was leaving politics to focus on her family. Her father, Ron Johnson ran in the by-election to replace her, but was defeated by Liberal Steve Crocker.

=== Post-politics ===
In November 2017, Johnson was appointed as CEO of the Newfoundland and Labrador Oil & Gas Industries Association (Noia).

== Electoral record ==
2011 Newfoundland and Labrador general election
Party	Candidate	Votes	%	±%
Progressive Conservative	Charlene Johnson	2882	61.91%	–
Liberal	Barry Snow	1114	23.93%	
NDP	Sheina Lerman	659	14.16%	

2007 Newfoundland and Labrador general election
Party	Candidate	Votes	%	±%
Progressive Conservative	Charlene Johnson	3572	71.93%	–
Liberal	Bruce M. Layman	1137	22.9%	
NDP	Don Penney	257	5.18%	

2003 Newfoundland and Labrador general election
Party	Candidate	Votes	%	±%
Progressive Conservative	Charlene Johnson	4091	63.2%	–
Liberal	Lloyd G. Snow	2095	32.37%	
NDP	Victoria Harnum	287	4.43%	
