= Ed Buckingham =

Canadian politician

Member of the Newfoundland and Labrador House of Assembly for St. John's East
- In office October 11, 2007 – September 19, 2011
- Preceded by: John Ottenheimer
- Succeeded by: George Murphy

Personal details
- Born: St. John's, Newfoundland
- Party: Progressive Conservative
- Occupation: Teacher, Politician

Ed Buckingham is a former Canadian politician from the province of Newfoundland and Labrador. Buckingham represented the district of St. John's East in the Newfoundland and Labrador House of Assembly. He was elected in the 2007 provincial election as a member of the Progressive Conservative Party. He lost his seat in the 2011 provincial election to the NDP.

== Electoral history ==
2011 Newfoundland and Labrador general election
Party	Candidate	Votes	%	±%
NDP	George Murphy	2,766	52.11%	
Progressive Conservative	Ed Buckingham	2,175	40.98%	–
Liberal	Michael Duffy	367	6.91%	

2007 Newfoundland and Labrador general election
Party	Candidate	Votes	%	±%
Progressive Conservative	Ed Buckingham	3,649	70.11%	–
NDP	Gemma Schlamp-Hickey	864	16.6%	
Liberal	Peter Adams	692	13.29%	
