= Wallace Young =

Canadian politician

Member of the Newfoundland and Labrador House of Assembly for St. Barbe
- In office January 30, 2001 – September 19, 2011
- Preceded by: Chuck Furey
- Succeeded by: Jim Bennett

Personal details
- Party: Progressive Conservative
- Occupation: Businessman

Wallace "Wally" Young MHA, is a Canadian politician in Newfoundland and Labrador, Canada. He represented the district of St. Barbe in the Newfoundland and Labrador House of Assembly as a member of the Progressive Conservative Party from 2001 until 2011. Young was elected in a 2001 by-election and re-elected in the 2003 and 2007 provincial elections. Young was defeated in the 2011 provincial election by former Liberal leader Jim Bennett.

Young served as the Parliamentary Secretary to the Minister of Innovation, Trade and Rural Development from November 27, 2009 until September 19, 2011.

== Electoral history ==
2011 Newfoundland and Labrador general election
| Party | Candidate | Votes | % | ±% |
|---|---|---|---|---|
| Liberal | Jim Bennett | 1816 | 45.05% | |
| Progressive Conservative | Wallace Young | 1778 | 44.11% | – |
| NDP | Diane Ryan | 437 | 10.84% | |

2007 Newfoundland and Labrador general election
| Party | Candidate | Votes | % | ±% |
|---|---|---|---|---|
| Progressive Conservative | Wallace Young | 2491 | 58.65% | – |
| Liberal | Jim Bennett | 1560 | 36.73% | |
| NDP | B. Gary Noel | 196 | 4.62% | |

2003 Newfoundland and Labrador general election
| Party | Candidate | Votes | % | ±% |
|---|---|---|---|---|
| Progressive Conservative | Wallace Young | 2948 | 61.18% | – |
| Liberal | Ralph Payne | 1577 | 32.73% | |
| NDP | Holly Patey | 293 | 6.08% | |
