= Ray Hunter =

Canadian politician

Member of the Newfoundland and Labrador House of Assembly for Grand Falls-Windsor-Green Bay South
- In office 2007 – November 27, 2015
- Preceded by: first member
- Succeeded by: District Abolished

Member of the Newfoundland and Labrador House of Assembly for Windsor-Springdale
- In office 1999–2007
- Preceded by: Graham Flight
- Succeeded by: riding redistributed

Personal details
- Party: Progressive Conservative
- Occupation: Electrician, Businessman

Ray Hunter is a Canadian politician in Newfoundland and Labrador, Canada. He represented the district of Grand Falls-Windsor-Green Bay South in the Newfoundland and Labrador House of Assembly until his retirement in 2015. He has sat as a member of the Progressive Conservative Party (PC) since being first elected in the 1999 provincial election, he has since been re-elected in the 2003 and 2007 elections.

In June 2011, former Conservative Member of Parliament Rex Barnes challenged him for the PC nomination but Hunter easily defeated him and was re-elected in the October election.

== Electoral record ==
2011 Newfoundland and Labrador general election
Party	Candidate	Votes	%	±%
Progressive Conservative	Ray Hunter	2,131	57.38%	–
Liberal	Merv Wiseman	1,165	31.37%	
NDP	Clyde Bridger	418	11.25%	

2007 Newfoundland and Labrador general election
Party	Candidate	Votes	%	±%
Progressive Conservative	Ray Hunter	2,620	69.22%	–
Liberal	Aubrey Smith	973	25.71%	
NDP	John L. Whelan	192	5.07%	
