= Sheila Osborne =

Canadian politician (born 1942)

Member of the Newfoundland and Labrador House of Assembly for St. John's West
- In office July 21, 1997 – September 19, 2011
- Preceded by: Rex Gibbons
- Succeeded by: Dan Crummell

Personal details
- Born: December 5, 1942 (age 83) St. John's, Dominion of Newfoundland
- Party: Progressive Conservative
- Spouse: Tom Osborne Sr. (died 2026)
- Children: Tom Osborne Jr.

Sheila Osborne (born December 5, 1942) is a Canadian politician in Newfoundland and Labrador, Canada. She represented the district of St. John's West in the Newfoundland and Labrador House of Assembly from 1997 to 2011, as a member of the Progressive Conservative Party.

Osborne was first elected to the Newfoundland assembly in a 1997 by-election held after Liberal Rex Gibbons resigned his seat. Osborne announced in June 2011, that she would not seek re-election in October's provincial election.

Her son, Tom Osborne Jr., was also a member of the Newfoundland and Labrador House of Assembly. He is now an MP, representing the Cape Spear riding.
