= Executive Council of Newfoundland and Labrador =

Cabinet of the Canadian province of Newfoundland and Labrador

Executive Council of Newfoundland and Labrador Conseil exécutif de Terre-Neuve-et-Labrador
- Cabinet of the Province of Newfoundland and Labrador, Canada

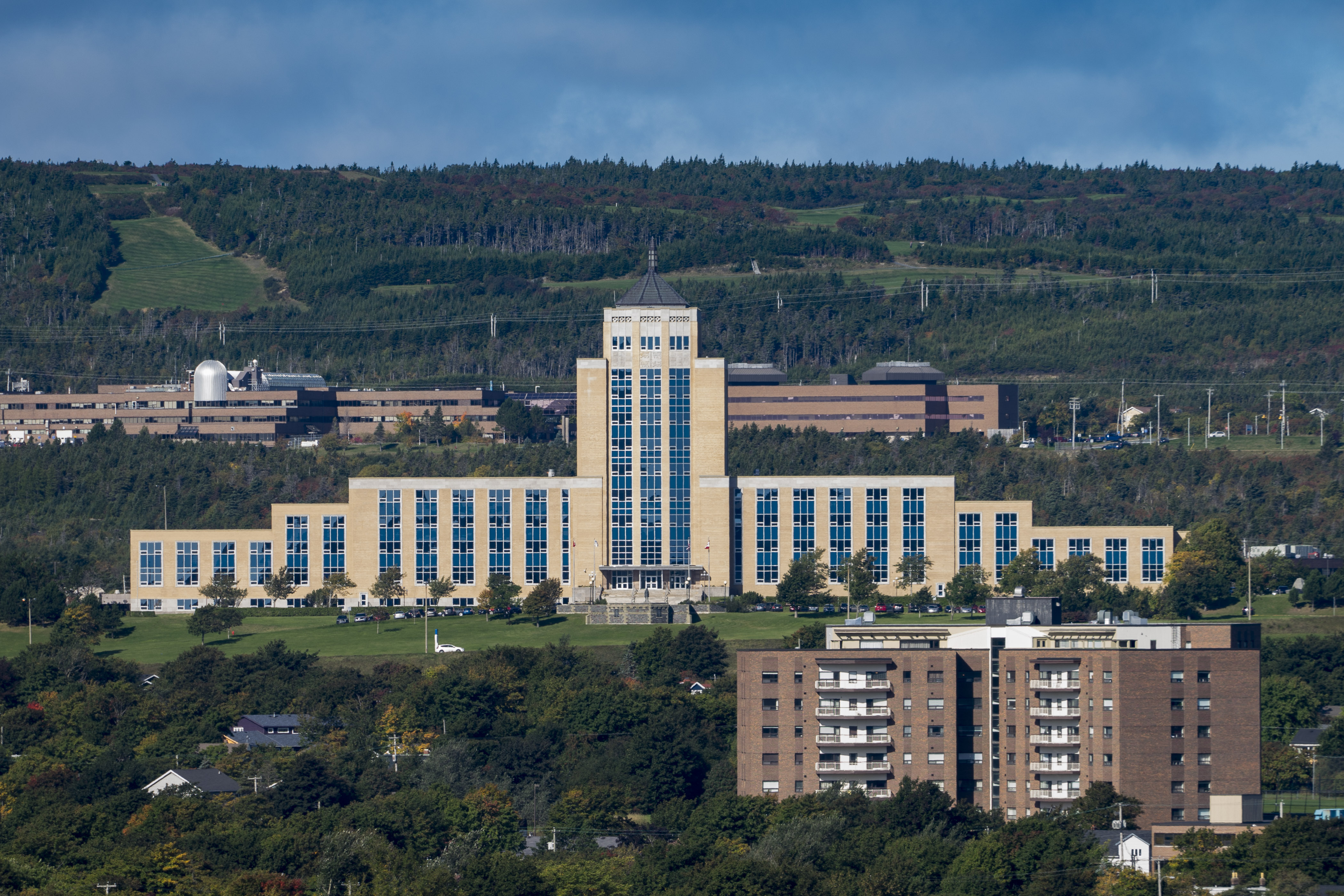
- Confederation Building is the seat of Executive Council
- Date formed: 1832 (194 years ago)

People and organizations
- Monarch: Charles III
- Lieutenant Governor: Joan Marie Aylward
- Premier: Tony Wakeham
- Current ministry: Wakeham ministry
- Member party: Progressive Conservative

The Executive Council of Newfoundland and Labrador (French: Conseil exécutif de Terre-Neuve-et-Labrador), often referred to as the Cabinet of Newfoundland and Labrador, is the cabinet headed by the lieutenant governor and composed of the ministers in office. The Executive Council is composed only of ministers in office, and is the official body by which Cabinet's constitutional advice is given to the lieutenant governor.

The Executive Council is thus similar in structure and role to the federal King's Privy Council for Canada, though smaller in size, and, whereas the federal cabinet is a committee of the King's Privy Council, the Executive Council of Newfoundland and Labrador and Cabinet of Newfoundland one and the same. Also, unlike the King's Privy Council, members of the Executive Council of Newfoundland and Labrador are not appointed for life, and are not entitled to post-nominal letters due to their position.

The Lieutenant Governor of Newfoundland and Labrador, as representative of the King in Right of Newfoundland and Labrador, heads the council, and is referred to as the Governor-in-Council. Most cabinet ministers are the head of a ministry, but this is not always the case. The lieutenant governor, advised by the Premier, determines which portfolios will be created. Ministers organize their department and present legislation for the new ministry if none exists. Other members of the Cabinet, who advise, or minister, the vice-regal, are selected by the Premier of Newfoundland and Labrador and appointed by the lieutenant governor.

The Executive Council has offices and meetings at Confederation Building East Block.

== Current Cabinet ==
The 2025 Newfoundland and Labrador general election resulted in a victory for the PC Party. Tony Wakeham and his Cabinet were sworn in on October 29, 2025. On August 20, 2026, Wakeham completed a cabinet shuffle.

Lieutenant Governor
Her Honour The Honourable Joan Marie Aylward	(2023–present)
Portfolio	Minister
Premier of Newfoundland and Labrador (2025–present) President of Executive Council (2025–present) Minister for Intergovernmental Affairs (2025–present)	Tony Wakeham
Deputy Premier (2025–present): Minister of Transportation and Infrastructure (2025–present); Minister of Public Procurement (2025–present); Minister of Municipal and Community Affairs (2026–present); Minister of Community Engagement (2026–present); Deputy Government House Leader (2026–present); Registrar General (2026–present)	Barry Petten
Minister of Justice and Public Safety (2025–present); Attorney General (2025–present); Minister Emergency Preparedness and Disaster Management (2025–2026); Minister Responsible for Access to Information and Protection of Privacy Office (2025–present); Minister Responsible for the Human Rights Commission (2025–present); Minister of Women and Gender Equality (2025–2026)	Helen Conway-Ottenheimer
Minister of Immigration (2025–present); Minister of Jobs and Growth (2025–present); Minister of Rural Development (2025–present); Minister of Francophone Affairs (2025–present)	Lin Paddock
Minister of Energy and Mines (2025–present); Government House Leader (2025–present); Minister of Government Services (2026–present); Minister of Red Tape Reduction (2026–present); Minister of Labour (2026–present); Minister Responsible for Workplace NL (2026–present)	Lloyd Parrott
Minister of Forestry and Agriculture (2025–present); Minister of Crown Lands (2025–present); Minister of Emergency Preparedness and Disaster Management (2026–present) (Note: Succeeding Helen Conway-Ottenheimer on February 23, 2026)	Pleaman Forsey
Minister of Education and Early Childhood Development (2025–present); Minister of Advanced Education and Skills (2025–present)	Paul Dinn
Minister of Health and Community Services (2025–2026); Minister of Mental Health and Addictions (2025–2026); Minister Responsible for NL Health Services (2025–2026); Minister of Labrador Affairs and Indigenous Relations and Reconciliation (2025–present); Minister of Women and Gender Equality (2026–present) (Note: Appointed on February 24, 2026, succeeding Helen Conway-Ottenheimer)	Lela Evans
Minister of Housing (2025–2026); Minister of Social Supports and Well-Being (2025–2026); Minister of Poverty Reduction (2025–2026); Minister Responsible for the Status of Persons with Disabilities (2025–2026); Deputy Government House Leader (2025–2026); Minister of Health and Community Services (2026–present); Minister of Mental Health and Addictions (2026–present); Minister Responsible for NL Health Services (2026–present)	Joedy Wall
Minister of Tourism, Culture, and Arts (2025–2026); Minister of Sports, Recreation, and Parks (2025–2026); Minister Responsible for PictureNL (2025–2026); Minister Responsible for Newfoundland and Labrador Arts Council (2025–2026); Minister Responsible for the Pippy Park Commission (2025–2026); Minister of Environment, Conservation and Climate Change (2026–present); Minister Responsible for the Multi-Materials Stewardship Board (2026–present)	Andrea Barbour
Minister of Government Services (2025–2026); Minister of Labour (2025–2026); Minister Responsible for the Office of the Chief Information Officer (2025–2026); Minister Responsible for WorkplaceNL (2025–2026); Minister of Tourism, Culture and Arts (2026–present); Minister of Sport, Recreation and Parks (2026–present); Minister Responsible for PictureNL (2026–present); Minister Responsible for the Newfoundland and Labrador Arts Council (2026–present); Minister Responsible for the Pippy Park Commission (2026–present)	Mike Goosney
Minister of Municipal and Community Affairs (2025–2026); Registrar General (2025–2026); Minister of Community Engagement (2025–2026); Minister of Environment, Conservation, and Climate Change (2025–2026); Minister Responsible for Multi-Material Stewardship Board (2025–2026); Minister of Housing (2026–present); Minister of Social Supports and Well-Being (2026–present); Minister of Poverty Reduction (2026–present); Minister Responsible for the Status of Persons with Disabilities (2026–present)	Chris Tibbs
Minister of Finance (2025–present); President of Treasury Board (2025–present); Minister of Seniors (2025–present); Minister Responsible for the Public Service Commission (2025–present); Minister Responsible for the Newfoundland and Labrador Liquor Corporation (2025–present); Minister Responsible for the Office of the Chief Information Officer (2026–present)	Craig Pardy
Minister of Fisheries and Aquaculture (2025–present)	Loyola O'Driscoll
