= Burgeo-La Poile =

Provincial electoral district in Newfoundland and Labrador, Canada

Coordinates: 47.8583°N 58.233°W

Newfoundland and Labrador electoral district
- Burgeo-La Poile in relation to other districts in Newfoundland

Provincial electoral district
- Legislature: Newfoundland and Labrador House of Assembly
MHA
Michael King
Liberal
- District created: 1995
- First contested: 1996
- Last contested: 2025

Demographics
- Population (2006): 10,600
- Electors (2011): 7,527

Burgeo-La Poile is a provincial electoral district for the House of Assembly of Newfoundland and Labrador, Canada. As of 2011, there are 7,527 eligible voters living within the district. The district was first created when Newfoundland joined confederation in 1949 as Burgeo and La Poile, and existed until 1975. It was recreated in 1995 following a reduction in the number of seats in the House of Assembly from 52 to 48, forming from the amalgamation of the former districts of La Poile and Burgeo-Bay D'Espoir.

The district takes in the southwestern corner of Newfoundland, stretching from the town of Burgeo in the east to Cape Ray in the west. Its largest community, Port aux Basques, is the island's link to continental North America through the Marine Atlantic ferry service.

The population in the region dropped by about 15 per cent between 1996 and 2001. The size of the district grew significantly in the 2007 redistribution as the eastern border pushed out an extra 37 kilometres.

The district is one of the strongest Liberal regions of the province, and was one of only three districts to return a Liberal MHA in the 2007 election. The district contains intra-provincial ferries servicing Grey River, Ramea, and La Poile.

== Geography ==
The district includes the part of the province of Newfoundland and Labrador bounded as follows: Beginning at the point of intersection with the Meridian of 57 degrees West Longitude and the shoreline of the southwest coast, located east of the community of Grey River; Thence running due north along the Meridian of 57 degrees West Longitude to its intersection with the Parallel of 48 degrees 30 minutes North Latitude; Thence running west along the Parallel of 48 degrees 30 minutes North Latitude to its intersection with the Meridian of 58 degrees West Longitude; Thence running in a southwesterly direction to the point of land known as Red Rocks, located on the eastern shoreline of Cabot Strait, north of Cape Ray; Thence running in a general easterly direction along the sinuosities of the southwest coast to the point of beginning, together with Burgeo Island, the Ramea Islands and all other islands adjacent thereto.

All geographic coordinates being scaled and referenced to the Universal Transverse Mercator Map Projection and the North American Datum of 1983.

=== Federal riding ===
The provincial boundary of this district falls within the federal district of Long Range Mountains.

== Communities ==
1. Burgeo
2. Burnt Islands
3. Cape Ray
4. Channel-Port aux Basques
5. Diamond Cove
6. East Bay
7. Fox Roost
8. Grand Bruit
9. Grey River
10. Harbour Le Cou
11. Isle aux Morts
12. La Poile
13. Margaree
14. Petites
15. Ramea
16. Rose Blanche

== Members of the House of Assembly ==
=== District of Burgeo-Lapoile ===
Assembly	Years	Member	Party
43rd	1996–1999	Bill Ramsay	Liberal
44th	1999–2003	Kelvin Parsons	Liberal
45th	2003–2007	Kelvin Parsons	Liberal
46th	2007–2011	Kelvin Parsons	Liberal
47th	2011–2015	Andrew Parsons	Liberal
48th	2015–2019	Andrew Parsons	Liberal
49th	2019–2021	Andrew Parsons	Liberal
50th	2021–2025	Andrew Parsons	Liberal
51st	2025–present	Michael King	Liberal

=== Former District of Lapoile ===
Assembly	Years	Member	Party
29th	1949–1951	Herman Quinton	Liberal
30th	1951–1956	George Norman	Liberal
31st	1956–1959	John T. Cheeseman	Liberal
32nd	1959–1962	John T. Cheeseman	Liberal
33rd	1962–1966	Walter Hodder	Liberal
34th	1966–1971	Walter Hodder	Liberal
35th	1971–1972	Allan Evans	Progressive Conservative
36th	1972–1975	Allan Evans	Progressive Conservative
37th	1975–1976	Steve Neary	Independent
37th	1976–1979	Steve Neary	Liberal
38th	1975–1979	Steve Neary	Liberal
39th	1979–1982	Steve Neary	Liberal
40th	1982–1985	Steve Neary	Liberal
41st	1985–1989	Calvin Mitchell	Progressive Conservative
41st	1989–1993	Bill Ramsay	Liberal
42nd	1993–1996	Bill Ramsay	Liberal

=== Former District of Burgeo-Bay D'Espoir ===
Assembly	Years	Member	Party
38th	1975–1979	Roger Simmons	Liberal
39th	1979–1982	Roger Simmons	Liberal
40th	1982–1985	Harold Andrews	Progressive Conservative
41st	1985–1989	David Gilbert	Liberal
42nd	1989–1993	David Gilbert	Liberal
43rd	1983–1996	David Gilbert	Liberal

== Election results ==
Graph of election results (minor parties that never got 2% of the vote or did not run consistently are omitted) View source data.

2025 Newfoundland and Labrador general election
Party	Candidate	Votes	%	±%
Liberal	Michael King	2,001	59.84	-27.26
Progressive Conservative	Victoria Young	1,259	37.65	+27.37
New Democratic	Judy Vanta	84	2.51	-0.11
Total valid votes		3,344		
Total rejected ballots				
Turnout				
Eligible voters				
Liberal hold		Swing		-27.32

2021 Newfoundland and Labrador general election
Party	Candidate	Votes	%	±%
Liberal	Andrew Parsons	1,992	87.10	+3.64
Progressive Conservative	Ethan Maxwell Wheeler-Park	235	10.28	-6.26
New Democratic	Judy Vanta	60	2.62	
Total valid votes		2,287	99.69	
Total rejected ballots		7	0.31	
Turnout		2,294	33.54	
Eligible voters		6,839		
Liberal hold		Swing		+4.95
Source(s) "Officially Nominated Candidates General Election 2021" (PDF). Elections Newfoundland and Labrador. "NL Election 2021 (Unofficial Results)".

2019 Newfoundland and Labrador general election
Party	Candidate	Votes	%	±%
Liberal	Andrew Parsons	2,947	83.5	-12.3
Progressive Conservative	Deborah Ann Turner	584	16.5	+14.3
Total valid votes		3,531	100	

2015 Newfoundland and Labrador general election
Party	Candidate	Votes	%	±%
Liberal	Andrew Parsons	3,998	96.48%	+44.36
Progressive Conservative	Georgia Darmonkow	93	2.24%	-41.03
New Democratic	Kelly McKeown	53	1.28%	-3.33
Total valid votes		4,144	100.00	
Liberal hold		Swing		+42.70

Burgeo-La Poile — 2011 Newfoundland and Labrador general election
Party	Candidate	Votes	%	±%
Liberal	Andrew Parsons	2,228	52.12%	-7.54
Progressive Conservative	Colin Short	1,850	43.27%	+4.69
New Democratic	Matt Fuchs	197	4.16%	+2.40
Total valid votes		4,275	100.00	

Burgeo-La Poile — 2007 Newfoundland and Labrador general election
Party	Candidate	Votes	%	±%
Liberal	Kelvin Parsons	2,882	59.66%	-21.10
Progressive Conservative	Colin Short	1,864	38.58%	–
New Democratic	June Hiscock	85	1.76%	–

Burgeo-La Poile — 2003 Newfoundland and Labrador general election
Party	Candidate	Votes	%	±%
Liberal	Kelvin Parsons	4,233	80.76%	+21.28%
Progressive Conservative	Stephen P. Mackenzie	1,008	19.23%	–

Burgeo-La Poile — 1999 Newfoundland and Labrador general election
Party	Candidate	Votes	%	±%
Liberal	Kelvin Parsons	3,421	59.48%	–
Progressive Conservative	Greg Sheaves	1,988	34.57%	–
New Democratic	O. Marsden	342	5.95%	–

Burgeo-La Poile — 1996 Newfoundland and Labrador general election
Party	Candidate	Votes	%	±%
Liberal	Bill Ramsay	3598	60.17%	–
Progressive Conservative	Cheryl Stagg	2382	39.83%	–

=== As District of La Poile ===
La Poile — 1993 Newfoundland and Labrador general election
Party	Candidate	Votes	%	±%
Liberal	Bill Ramsay	2,706	49.98%	–
Progressive Conservative	Cal Mitchell	1,403	25.91%	–
Independent	Paul Gillingham	1,206	22.28%	–
New Democratic	Janet Francis	99	1.83%	–

=== As District of Burgeo-Bay d'Espoir ===
Burgeo-Bay d'Espoir — 1993 Newfoundland and Labrador general election
Party	Candidate	Votes	%	±%
Liberal	David S. Gilbert	2,980	64.54%	–
Progressive Conservative	James Oxford	1,450	31.41%	–
New Democratic	Sam Organ	187	4.05%	–

== See also ==
- List of Newfoundland and Labrador provincial electoral districts
- Canadian provincial electoral districts
