= Newfoundland and Labrador Health Services =

Provincial Health Authority in Newfoundland and Labrador

NL Health Services
- NL Health Services' logo
- Type: Healthcare
- Predecessor: Central Health; Eastern Health; Labrador-Grenfell Health; Newfoundland and Labrador Centre for Health Information; Western Health
- Founded: April 3, 2023
- Headquarters: St. John's, NL, Canada
- Area served: Newfoundland and Labrador
- Key people: Ron Johnson, Interim Chief Executive Officer

Newfoundland and Labrador Health Services (NL Health Services, NLHS) is the integrated health authority of Newfoundland and Labrador, tasked with the administration and delivery of health care services across the province.

== History ==
The organization was established on April 3, 2023, from the merger of the province's previous 4 regional health authorities (Eastern Health, Central Health, Western Health, and Labrador-Grenfell Health), as well as the Newfoundland and Labrador Centre for Health Information (NLCHI). This merger was created following the passing of legislation proposed in 2022, enacted with the aim of consolidating the province's numerous regional health authorities into a single organization.

NL Health Services is governed by a board of trustees appointed by the provincial government via the Independent Appointments Commission.

== Areas served ==
NLHS is responsible for the administration of healthcare throughout the province, and is divided into five administrative zones, quoted from their website as follows:

- Central: Communities from Charlottetown, Fogo Island, Harbour Breton, to Baie Verte.
- Eastern Rural: Holyrood, Southern Avalon and Bell Island, municipalities west of Holyrood and Witless Bay up to Port Blandford.
- Eastern Urban: Conception Bay South, Witless Bay, Bay Bulls, the Greater St. John's area, municipalities east of Conception Bay South and Witless Bay up to Pouch Cove (excluding Bell Island).
- Labrador-Grenfell: The entirety of Labrador, communities north of Bartlett's Harbour
- Western: Communities from Port aux Basques, Francois, Bartlett's Harbour, and on the eastern boundary north to Jackson's Arm.

== Facilities ==
Central Zone	Eastern Rural Zone	Eastern Urban Zone	Labrador-Grenfell Zone	Western Zone
A.M. Guy Memorial Health Centre (Buchans); Baie Verte Peninsula Health Centre (Baie Verte); Bay d’Espoir Community Health Centre (Bay d'Espoir); Belleoram Community Health Centre (Belleoram); Bell Place Community Health Centre (Gander); Bonnews Lodge (Badger's Quay); Carmelite House (Grand Falls-Windsor); Central Newfoundland Regional Health Centre (Grand Falls-Windsor); Central Regional Office (Grand Falls-Windsor); Centreville Community Health Centre (Centreville); Change Islands Community Health Centre (Change Islands); Connaigre Peninsula Health Centre (Harbour Breton); Dr. Brian Adams Community Health Centre (Gambo); Dr. C.V. Smith Memorial Community Health Centre (Glovertown); Dr. Hugh Twomey Health Centre (Botwood); Dr. Y. K. Jeon Kittiwake Health Centre (Brookfield); Eastport Community Health Centre (Eastport); Exploits Community Health Centre (Botwood); Fogo Island Health Centre (Fogo); Gander Long Term Care Home (Gander); Gaultois Community Health Centre (Gaultois); Grand Falls-Windsor Community Health Centre (Grand Falls-Windsor); Grand Falls-Windsor Long Term Care Home (Grand Falls-Windsor); Green Bay Health Centre (Springdale); Hermitage Community Health Centre (Hermitage-Sandyville); Hope Valley Youth Treatment Centre (Grand Falls-Windsor); James Paton Memorial Regional Health Centre (Gander); Lakeside Homes (Gander); Lewisporte Community Health Centre (Lewisporte); Lewisporte Health Centre (Lewisporte); Lewisporte Protective Care Residence (Lewisporte); McCallum Community Health Centre (McCallum); McCurdy Complex (Gander); Mose Ambrose Community Health Centre (Mose Ambrose); Musgrave Harbour Community Health Centre (Musgrave Harbour); New World Island Community Health Centre (Summerford); Notre Dame Bay Memorial Health Centre (Twillingate); Rencontre East Community Health Centre (Rencontre East); Robert’s Arm Community Health Centre (Robert's Arm); St. Alban’s Community Health Centre (St. Alban's); St. Brendan’s Community Health Centre (St. Brendan's); Valley Vista Senior Citizens’ Home (Springdale); Victoria Cove Community Health Centre (Victoria Cove)	Bay Roberts Regional Centre (Bay Roberts); Blue Crest Nursing Home (Grand Bank); Bonavista Bungalows Protective Community Residence (Bonavista); Bonavista Peninsula Health Centre (Bonavista); Burin Peninsula Health Care Centre (Burin); Carbonear Community Services Building (Carbonear); Carbonear General Hospital (Carbonear); Chapel Arm Medical Clinic (Chapel Arm); Clarenville Protective Community Care Residence (Clarenville); Coish Place (Clarenville); Come By Chance District Office (Come By Chance); D. M. Brown Building (Clarenville); Dr. A.A. Wilkinson Memorial Hospital (Old Perlican); Dr. Albert O’Mahony Memorial Manor (Clarenville); Dr. G.B. Cross Memorial Hospital (Clarenville); Dr. Hilda Tremblett Wellness Centre (Bonavista); Dr. S. Beckly Health Centre (Grand Bank); Dr. Walter Templeman Health Care Centre (Bell Island); Dr. William H. Newhook Community Health Centre (Whitbourne); Ferryland Health and Community Service Clinic (Ferryland); Golden Heights Manor (Bonavista); Heart’s Delight District Office (Heart's Delight); Holyrood Regional Office (Holyrood); Lethbridge District Office (Lethbridge); Lion’s Manor Nursing Home (Placentia); Marystown Community Services (Marystown); Nurse Abernathy Clinic (Trepassey); Park Place (Clarenville); Placentia District Office (Placentia); Placentia Health Centre (Placentia); Placentia West Medical Clinic (Boat Harbour); Pte. Josiah Squibb Memorial Pavilion (Carbonear); South East Bight Clinic (South East Bight); St. Bride’s District Office (St. Bride's); St. Mary’s Health Centre (St. Mary's); Terrenceville Medical Centre (Terrenceville); The Clarenville Medical Arts Clinic (Clarenville); The Grace Centre (Harbour Grace); Trinity Medical Clinic (Trinity); U.S. Memorial Health Centre (St. Lawrence); Western Bay Medical Clinic (Western Bay); Whitbourne Community Services (Whitbourne)	All sites located within St. John's unless otherwise noted: 657 Topsail Road; Administration and Executive Offices; Agnes Pratt Home; Bay Bulls Community Health Centre (Bay Bulls); Buckmaster’s Circle Community Centre; Caribou Memorial Veterans Pavilion; Charles R. Bell Building; Conception Bay South Clinic (Manuels); Cordage Place; Downtown Collaborative Clinic; Dr H. Bliss Murphy Cancer Centre; Dr. L. A. Miller Centre; Family Care Team Centre; Family Care Team East; Family Care Team West; Froude Avenue Community Health Office; Harm Reduction Outreach; Health Innovation Acceleration Centre; Health Sciences Centre; Janeway Children's Health and Rehabilitation Centre; Janeway Lifestyles and Pulmonary Function Clinics; LeMarchant House; MacMorran Community Centre; Major’s Path Clinic; Mental Health and Addictions Centre; Mount Pearl Square (Mount Pearl); Mundy Pond Community Walk-in Clinic; Mundy Pond Harm Reduction Clinic; Nuclear and Molecular Medicine Facility; Pleasant View Towers; Rabbittown Community Centre; Recovery Centre; Saint Luke’s Homes; Saint Patrick’s Mercy Home; Salvation Army Glenbrook Lodge; Shea Heights Community Health Centre; Southcott Hall; St. Clare’s Mercy Hospital; Torbay Community Health Clinic (Torbay); Tuckamore Treatment Centre (Paradise); Waterford Hospital	Black Tickle Community Clinic (Black Tickle); Cartwright Community Clinic (Cartwright); Charles S. Curtis Memorial Hospital (St. Anthony); Charlottetown Community Clinic (Charlottetown); Churchill Falls Community Clinic (Churchill Falls); Happy Valley-Goose Bay Long Term Care Home (Happy Valley-Goose Bay); Hopedale Community Clinic (Hopedale); John M. Gray Centre and Complex (St. Anthony); Labrador Health Centre (Happy Valley-Goose Bay); Labrador South Health Centre (Forteau); Labrador West Health Centre (Labrador City); Makkovik Community Clinic (Makkovik); Mani Ashini Community Clinic (North West River); Mary’s Harbour Community Clinic (Mary's Harbour); Nain Community Clinic (Nain); Natuashish Community Clinic (Natuashish); Port Hope Simpson Community Clinic (Port Hope Simpson); Postville Community Clinic (Postville); Rigolet Community Clinic (Rigolet); St. Lewis Community Clinic (St. Lewis); Strait of Belle Isle Health Centre (Flowers Cove); White Bay Central Health Centre (Roddickton)	Bay St. George Long Term Care Centre (Stephenville Crossing); Bay St. George Medical Clinic (Stephenville); Blomidon Place (Corner Brook); Bonne Bay Health Centre (Norris Point); Breast Screening Centre – Corner Brook (Corner Brook); Calder Health Centre (Burgeo); Corner Brook Community Health Centre (Corner Brook); Corner Brook Long Term Care (Corner Brook); Cow Head Medical Clinic (Cow Head); Cox’s Cove Clinic (Cox's Cove); Daniel’s Harbour Medical Clinic (Daniel's Harbour); Deer Lake Medical Clinic (Deer Lake); Deer Lake Population Health Office (Deer Lake); Degrau Medical Clinic (De Grau); Doyles Medical Clinic (Doyles); Dr. Charles L. Legrow Health Centre (Port aux Basques); Family Care Team Humber – Valley/White Bay (Deer Lake); Francois Clinic (Francois); Hammond Building (Corner Brook); Humberwood Centre (Corner Brook); Jackson’s Arm Medical Clinic (Jackson's Arm); Jeffrey’s Medical Clinic (Jeffrey's); LaPoile Medical Clinic (La Poile); Lourdes Medical Clinic (Lourdes); Meadows Clinic (Meadows); Melita Young/Grey River Medical Clinic (Grey River); Monaghan Hall (Corner Brook); Nurse Douglas Stewart Memorial Clinic (Ramea); Parson's Pond Medical Clinic (Parson's Pond); Pasadena Population Health Office (Pasadena); Piccadilly Population Health Office (Piccadilly); Pollard’s Point Medical Clinic (Pollard's Point); Port aux Basques Family Care Team (Port aux Basques); Port aux Basques Population Health (Port aux Basques); Protective Community Residences (Corner Brook); Rose Blanche Medical Clinic (Rose Blanche); Rufus Guinchard Health Centre (Port Saunders); Sir Thomas Roddick Hospital (Stephenville); Stephenville Crossing Medical Clinic (Stephenville Crossing); Stephenville Population Health Office (Stephenville); Stephenville Rehabilitation Annex (Stephenville); Trout River Medical Clinic (Trout River); Western Eye Care Centre (Corner Brook); Western Long Term Care Home (Corner Brook); Western Memorial Health Clinic (Corner Brook); Western Memorial Regional Hospital (Corner Brook); Woody Point Medical Clinic (Woody Point)
