= Newfoundland and Labrador Route 480 =

Highway in Newfoundland and Labrador, Canada

Route 480
- Burgeo Highway

Route information
- Maintained by Newfoundland and Labrador Department of Transportation and Infrastructure
- Length: 150 km (93 mi)

Major junctions
- South end: Ramea Ferry in Burgeo
- North end: Route 1 (TCH) near St. George's

Location
- Country: Canada
- Province: Newfoundland and Labrador

Highway system
- Highways in Newfoundland and Labrador
← Route 470	→ Route 490

Route 480, also known as Burgeo Highway or The Burgeo Road, is a 150-kilometre-long (93 mi) north-south highway on southwestern Newfoundland in the Canadian province of Newfoundland and Labrador. It connects the town of Burgeo with the Trans-Canada Highway (Route 1). The highway is a winding two-lane highway traveling through remote, hilly, and wooded terrain for its entire length. There are no other communities of any kind along the highway, with the only other intersections being abandoned logging roads. Route 480 also provides access to Sandbanks Provincial Park and ferries to the remote outports of Ramea, Grey River and Francois at its southern terminus. There are also several vacation/hunting camps along Route 480, including Peter Strides.

Route 480 also carries the designation of The Caribou Trail.

== Major intersections ==
Location	km	mi	Destinations	Notes
Burgeo	0.0	0.0	Ramea, Grey River and Francois Ferry docks	Southern terminus
Burgeo	0.5	0.31	Main Street - Sandbanks Provincial Park (Newfoundland)	
	99.6	61.9	Buchans Resource Road To Route 370 – Buchans	Mid Island Route; closed winters
	150	93	Route 1 (TCH) – Port aux Basques, Corner Brook	Northern terminus; provides access to nearby Barachois Pond Provincial Park
1.000 mi = 1.609 km; 1.000 km = 0.621 mi

== Route description ==
The road, which is perpendicular to the Trans-Canada Highway, also has another sharp 90 degree turn where it meets the Buchans Resource Road (Route 370).

Route 480 passes through the Annieopsquotch Mountains.

== See also ==
- Burgeo
- List of Newfoundland and Labrador highways
- Sandbanks Provincial Park (Newfoundland)
