= Newfoundland and Labrador Route 470 =

Highway in Newfoundland and Labrador, Canada

Route 470
- La Poile Highway

Route information
- Maintained by Newfoundland and Labrador Department of Transportation and Infrastructure
- Length: 42.8 km (26.6 mi)

Major junctions
- West end: Route 1 (TCH) at Channel-Port aux Basques
- East end: Rose Blanche

Location
- Country: Canada
- Province: Newfoundland and Labrador

Highway system
- Highways in Newfoundland and Labrador
← Route 463	→ Route 480

Route 470, also known as La Poile Highway, is a highway on the West Coast of the Canadian province of Newfoundland and Labrador. It is the last provincial highway off Route 1 before approaching the Marine Atlantic Ferry to Nova Scotia, at Channel-Port aux Basques. The route is 42.8 kilometres (26.6 mi) in length. During much of the journey, there is plenty of barren land on both sides of the road, until arriving at its final community, Rose Blanche. Route 470 also carries the designation of Granite Coast Scenic Drive.

== Route description ==
Route 470 begins at an interchange with Route 1 (Trans-Canada Highway, Exit 1) just north of the Marine Atlantic ferry docks in Channel-Port aux Basques. The highway winds its way through rural hilly terrain for several kilometres, where it meets a local road leading to Margaree and Fox Roost, as well as crosses the Isle aux Morts River, before passing through Isle aux Morts. Route 470 winds its way eastward along the Atlantic coastline for several kilometres to pass through Burnt Islands and meet a local road leading to Diamond Cove before entering the town of Rose Blanche-Harbour le Cou. The highway now crosses another river and passes by the La Poile ferry docks before becoming Main Street and having an intersection with a local road leading to the Harbour le Cou portion of town. Route 470 enters the Rose Blanche portion of town to pass through neighbourhoods, where it meets a road leading to the Lighthouse, before passing through downtown and coming to a dead end at the southern tip of a long, skinny, and peninsula.

== Major intersections ==
Location	km	mi	Destinations	Notes
Channel-Port aux Basques	0.0	0.0	Route 1 (TCH) – Corner Brook, Marine Atlantic Nova Scotia Ferry	Exit 1 on Route 1; western terminus
	5.9	3.7	Margaree Road (Route 470-10) - Margaree, Fox Roost	
Burnt Islands	26.1	16.2	Main Street - Downtown	
	39.9	24.8	Diamond Cove Road (Route 470-14) - Diamond Cove	
Rose Blanche	40.2	25.0	La Poile Ferry docks	Access road
Rose Blanche	40.9	25.4	Harbour le Cou Road (Route 470-16) - Harbour le Cou	
Rose Blanche	42.8	26.6	Dead End	Eastern terminus
1.000 mi = 1.609 km; 1.000 km = 0.621 mi
