= Cal Mitchell (politician) =

Canadian politician (born c. 1940)

Cal Mitchell MHA

Member of the Newfoundland House of Assembly for La Poile
- In office 2 April 1985 – 20 April 1989
- Preceded by: Steve Neary
- Succeeded by: Bill Ramsay

Personal details
- Born: c. 1940 Petites, Newfoundland
- Party: Progressive Conservative
- Profession: Businessman

Calvin "Cal" Mitchell is a Canadian politician from Newfoundland and Labrador. He was the member of the Newfoundland House of Assembly (MHA) for La Poile from 1985 to 1989.

== Politics ==
Mitchell is a businessman from Petites on the southern coast of Newfoundland. Before he was elected to the House of Assembly, he served as the president of the Southwest Coast Development Association.

Mitchell first attempted to run for the Progressive Conservative (PC) nomination in the riding of Burin—St. George's for the 1984 federal election, but he lost the nomination to Joe Price. He successfully ran as the PC candidate in the district of La Poile for the 1985 provincial election, having defeated former provincial Liberal leader Bill Rowe for the nomination. He served in the House of Assembly for just one term before losing to Liberal opponent Bill Ramsay in the 1989 election. Mitchell was again defeated by Ramsay in the subsequent 1993 election.

== Electoral history ==
1993 Newfoundland general election: La Poile
| Party | Candidate | Votes | % | ±% |
|---|---|---|---|---|
| Liberal | Bill Ramsay | 2,706 | 49.98 | ▲1.21 |
| Progressive Conservative | Cal Mitchell | 1,403 | 25.91 | ▼9.61 |
| Independent | Paul Gillingham | 1,206 | 22.28 | – |
| New Democratic | Janet Francis | 99 | 1.83 | ▼13.88 |
| Total valid votes | | 5,414 | 99.71 | |
| Total rejected ballots | | 16 | 0.29 | |
| Total votes | | 5,430 | 77.70 | ▲6.81 |
| Eligible voters | | 6,988 | | |
| Liberal hold | | Swing | | ▲8.23 |

1989 Newfoundland general election: La Poile
| Party | Candidate | Votes | % | ±% |
|---|---|---|---|---|
| Liberal | Bill Ramsay | 2,413 | 48.77 | ▲14.41 |
| Progressive Conservative | Cal Mitchell | 1,757 | 35.52 | ▼5.36 |
| New Democratic | Stephen MacKenzie | 777 | 15.71 | ▼9.05 |
| Total valid votes | | 4,947 | 99.88 | |
| Total rejected ballots | | 7 | 0.12 | |
| Total votes | | 4,953 | 70.89 | ▼5.33 |
| Eligible voters | | 6,988 | | |
| Liberal gain from Progressive Conservative | | Swing | | ▲9.61 |

1985 Newfoundland general election: La Poile
| Party | Candidate | Votes | % | ±% |
|---|---|---|---|---|
| Progressive Conservative | Cal Mitchell | 2,138 | 40.88 | ▼8.63 |
| Liberal | Noreen Saunders | 1,797 | 34.36 | ▼16.13 |
| New Democratic | Stephen MacKenzie | 1,295 | 24.76 | ▲23.42 |
| Total valid votes | | 5,230 | 99.65 | |
| Total rejected ballots | | 18 | 0.35 | |
| Total votes | | 5,248 | 76.22 | |
| Eligible voters | | 6,885 | | |
| Progressive Conservative gain from Liberal | | Swing | | ▲16.06 |
