= Kelvin Parsons =

Canadian politician

The Honourable Kelvin Parsons ECNL KC

Interim leader of the Liberal Party of Newfoundland and Labrador
- In office August 16, 2010 – February 2011
- Preceded by: Yvonne Jones
- Succeeded by: Yvonne Jones

Attorney General, Minister of Industry, Trade and Rural Development, And Minister of Justice
- In office January 13, 2000 – November 5, 2003
- Preceded by: Paul Dicks
- Succeeded by: Tom Rideout

MHA for Burgeo and La Poile
- In office 1999 – September 19, 2011
- Preceded by: Bill Ramsay
- Succeeded by: Andrew Parsons

Personal details
- Party: Liberal
- Spouse: Donna Lomond
- Children: 3 (Kristopher, Andrew & Adam)
- Education: Memorial University of Newfoundland, University of New Brunswick
- Cabinet: Minister of Justice and Attorney General (January 2000-April 2000); Deputy House Leader (April 2002-October 2003)

Kelvin Parsons is a Canadian politician in Newfoundland and Labrador, Canada. He represented the district of Burgeo and La Poile from 1999 to 2011. Parsons served as interim party leader from August 2010 until March 2011, while Liberal leader Yvonne Jones was undergoing treatments and recovering from breast cancer.

Parsons became a member of the Newfoundland Law Society in 1980 and maintained a private practice in Port aux Basques until his election to the House of Assembly in 1999.

Parsons was first elected in 1999. In January 2000, he was named justice minister of the province. He held that position until 2003 when the Liberal government was defeated. Parsons was one of only three Liberal elected in the 2007 election. In June 2011, Parsons announced that he would not seek re-election in the 2011 provincial election. His son Andrew Parsons sought the open Liberal nomination, and was elected as the district's new MHA.
