= Girasolar =

International solar energy company

Girasolar BV
- Company type: Private company
- Industry: Renewable energy
- Founded: 2003; 23 years ago
- Fate: defunct
- Headquarters: Deventer, Netherlands
- Website: dead

Girasolar, Inc. is a US-Dutch solar energy holding company founded in 2003 and based in Ann Arbor, Michigan, with its headquarters in Deventer, Netherlands, through GiraSolar BV. The company is active in photovoltaic applications, services, and product manufacturing in Europe, Turkey, and Africa. The scale of these sales range from a few kWp to several MW and include solar modules consisting of monocrystalline and polycrystalline solar cells. Much of its focus is on photovoltaics (PV) in Germany and Italy, supplemented by business in other European solar energy markets such as that of France.

In 2006, International Power Group, Ltd. agreed to acquire 51% of GiraSolar. From 2011 on, the company increasingly shifted its activities toward the Turkish PV market.

== Operations ==
=== Europe ===
GiraSolar's primary emphasis is on the European market. Through its subsidiary, GiraSolar-Germany, the company has engaged in a variety of projects throughout Germany, Italy, the Czech Republic, and several other countries. It also has been active in the French solar market and that of Romania.

=== Turkey ===
The company's Turkish subsidiary, GiraSolar Turkey, has installed hybrid power stations in Turkey and is a founding member of the Turkish “Formation of National PV Technology Platform" project. Examples of such hybrid power stations include a 33 kW tri-hybrid power station installed at Kızılada – Fethiye, a 2009 project in Çeşme – İzmir and a 6.4 kWp, 2010 off-grid pv system in Korkuteli-Antalya. Another project in Turkey comprised a 10 kWp, 2009 grid-tied installation on a Schneider Electric Co. building at Manisa. Additionally, GiraSolar has told the Hürriyet Daily News & Economic Review during a Dutch business mission event in Istanbul that the company is holding talks with a Turkish energy partner about the possibility of building a 100 MW solar power station in southern Turkey. Subsequently, further details about the proposed solar station were revealed in interview conducted by the Jerusalem Post If completed, this project will become Europe's largest solar plant. GiraSolar also reported that it planned to manufacture the solar panels in Turkey rather than import them.

=== Africa ===
In 2007, one of the company's subsidiaries, GiraMundo BV, entered into a joint venture in Ethiopia. GiraSolar has also been involved in projects in Mauritania and Uganda.

== Research and development ==
Another one of its subsidiaries, DutchSolar BV, is a participant in the SELFLEX research effort which is attempting to create solar cells based on self-formation technology. In 2009, the CEO of GiraSolar BV, Wieland Koornstra, took part in an Eco-Innovators Network interview during the 2009 Eco-Innovation Summit. GiraSolar is also active in silicon solar energy technology processes.

In 2014, GiraSolar participated in "The Great Game," an international competition held in Izmir by several academic institutions with the purpose of devising innovative ways to advance entrepreneurship. The conclusion focused on increasing the company's contacts, alliances, and integration with Building Integrated Photo Voltaic corporations.
