= Diamond Cove =

Diamond Cove may refer to:

- Diamond Cove, Calgary, a small residential neighbourhood
- Diamond Cove, Newfoundland and Labrador, a small settlement
- Diamond Cove, a ferry stop on Great Diamond Island, Maine
