= Western Health =

Western Health was the governing body for healthcare regulation in an area of the Canadian province of Newfoundland and Labrador. The area region included the communities of:

- Corner Brook
- Port Saunders
- Stephenville
- Channel-Port aux Basques
- Burgeo

In the 2022 provincial budget, the Newfoundland and Labrador Government announced its intentions to integrate the existing four health authorities into one entity. Legislation was passed in the House of Assembly approving the amalgamation in November 2022, and Western Health became part of Newfoundland and Labrador Health Services on April 3rd, 2023.
