= American Treaty Shore =

Fishing area around Newfoundland

The American Treaty Shore is an identification of the historical coastal area where American vessels had the right to fish, and to process fish on unsettled coves and bays, on the shore of the Colony of Newfoundland. This entailed the entire Labrador coast, as well and the Newfoundland coast from Quirpon Island southward to Cape Ray, and from that cape eastward to the Ramea Islands. These rights were stipulated in the Anglo-American Convention of 1818.
