= Central Health =

Central Health may refer to:

- Central Health (Newfoundland and Labrador) (Canada)
- Central Health (Texas) (United States)
