= Eastern Health =

Health region in Canada

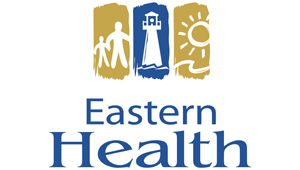
Eastern Health's Logo

Eastern Health was the largest integrated health authority in Newfoundland and Labrador. The organization provided a full continuum of health and community services, including public health, long-term care, and acute (hospital) care to a regional population of more than 300,000.

Eastern Health was established from seven previous services in April 2005. It was governed by a volunteer Board of Trustees appointed by the Minister of Health and Community Services according to the Regional Health Authorities Act.

The geographic boundaries for Eastern Health included the island portion of the province east of (and including) Port Blandford. This area included the entire Avalon, Burin and Bonavista Peninsulas as well as Bell Island, within a total of 21,000 square kilometres (8,100 sq mi). In addition to regional programs and services, Eastern Health was responsible for provincial tertiary-level health services through both academic health care facilities and provincial programs, such as Provincial Genetics, Hyperbaric Medicine, and the Provincial Public Health Laboratory. Eastern Health also partnered with numerous organizations – most notably Memorial University of Newfoundland and the College of the North Atlantic – to educate future health professionals, conduct research, advance knowledge, and improve overall patient, client and resident care.

Eastern Health had a budget of approximately $1.4 billion for the 2014-15 fiscal year, with 13,000 employees and 730 physicians, and approximately 1,500 volunteers. Similarly, Eastern Health benefited from the efforts of its six foundations and various auxiliaries.

In the 2022 provincial budget, the Newfoundland and Labrador Government announced its intentions to integrate the existing four health authorities into one entity. Legislation was passed in the House of Assembly approving the amalgamation in November 2022, and Eastern Health became part of Newfoundland and Labrador Health Services on April 3rd, 2023
