= Annieopsquotch Mountains =

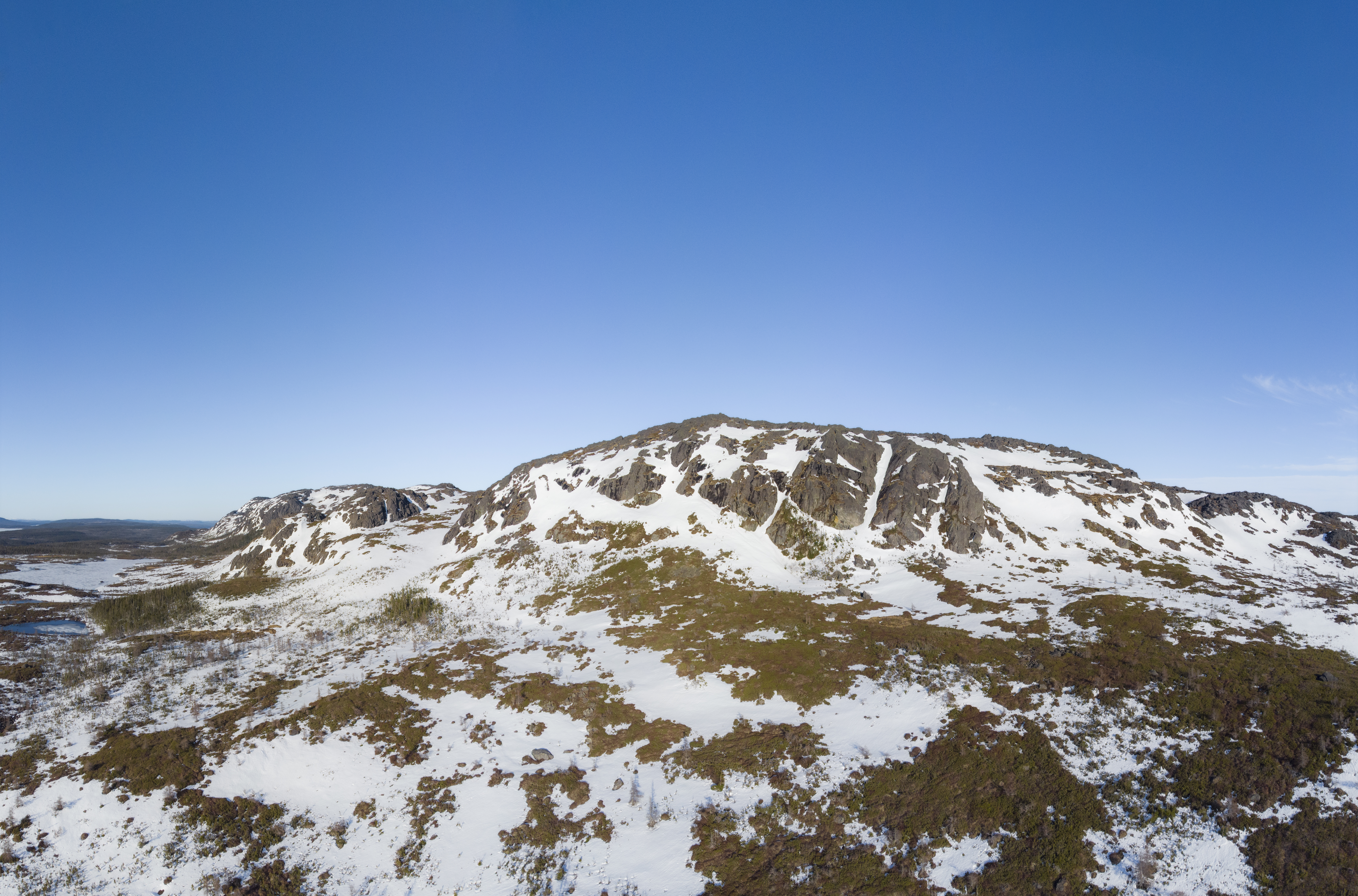
- Annieopsquotch Mountains near Burgeo, NL

Highest point
- Elevation: 687 m (2,254 ft)

Naming
- Etymology: Mi'kmaq for terrible rocks

Geography
- Location within Newfoundland and Labrador
- Country: Canada
- Province: Newfoundland and Labrador
- Range coordinates: 48°20′00″N 57°29′58″W
- Parent range: Appalachian Mountains

The Annieopsquotch Mountains (/ˌæniˈɒpskwɒtʃ/ AN-ee-OP-skwotch) are located in the southwestern interior of the Canadian island of Newfoundland, east of Bay St. George. Rising to a peak of 687 m (2,254 ft) above sea level, this range of hills runs in a north-eastward direction between Victoria Lake and Beothuk Lake. Its name is Mi'kmaq and literally translated means 'terrible rocks'.

Geologically the range is composed of Ordovician ocean floor rock which includes an ophiolite thrust onto the continent during the closure of the Iapetus Ocean. Silurian clastic sedimentary rocks unconformably overly the ophiolite and granite intruded the area during the Devonian. Faulting and tilting of the area continued through the Carboniferous.
