= God Bay =

Natural bay in Newfoundland and Labrador, Canada

Coordinates: 47.600°N 58.886°W

God Bay (Baie de Vielles) is a natural bay on the island of Newfoundland in the province of Newfoundland and Labrador, Canada. The village of Burnt Islands is located by the bay.
