= La Poile Bay =

Natural bay in Newfoundland, Canada

Coordinates: 47.716°N 58.348°W

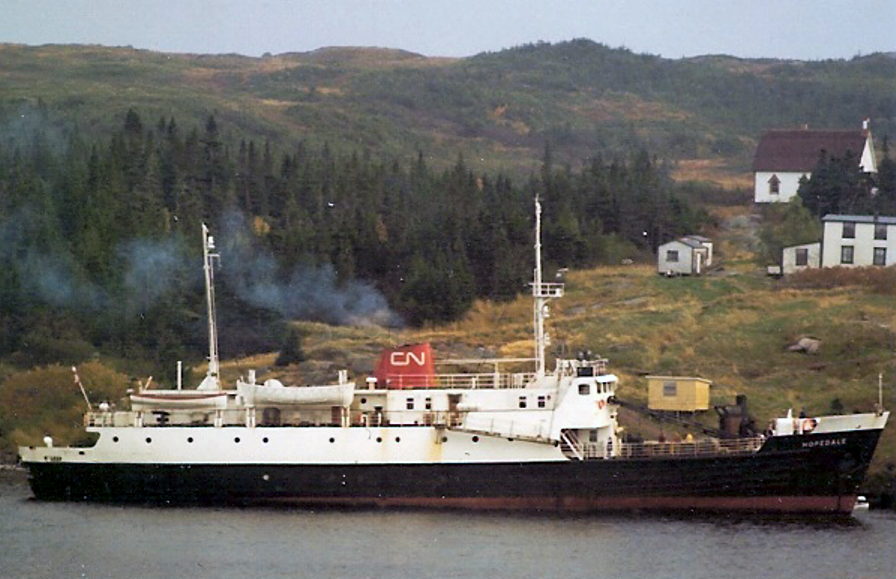
Canadian National outport ferry in La Poile Bay, Newfoundland.

La Poile Bay is a natural bay in Newfoundland, Canada, in the southwestern area of the island, off the south coast. It subdivides into Northeast Arm and North Bay. The settlement of La Poile is located on the bay.
