= Andrew Parsons (Canadian politician) =

Canadian politician (born 1979)

The Honourable Andrew Parsons ECNL KC
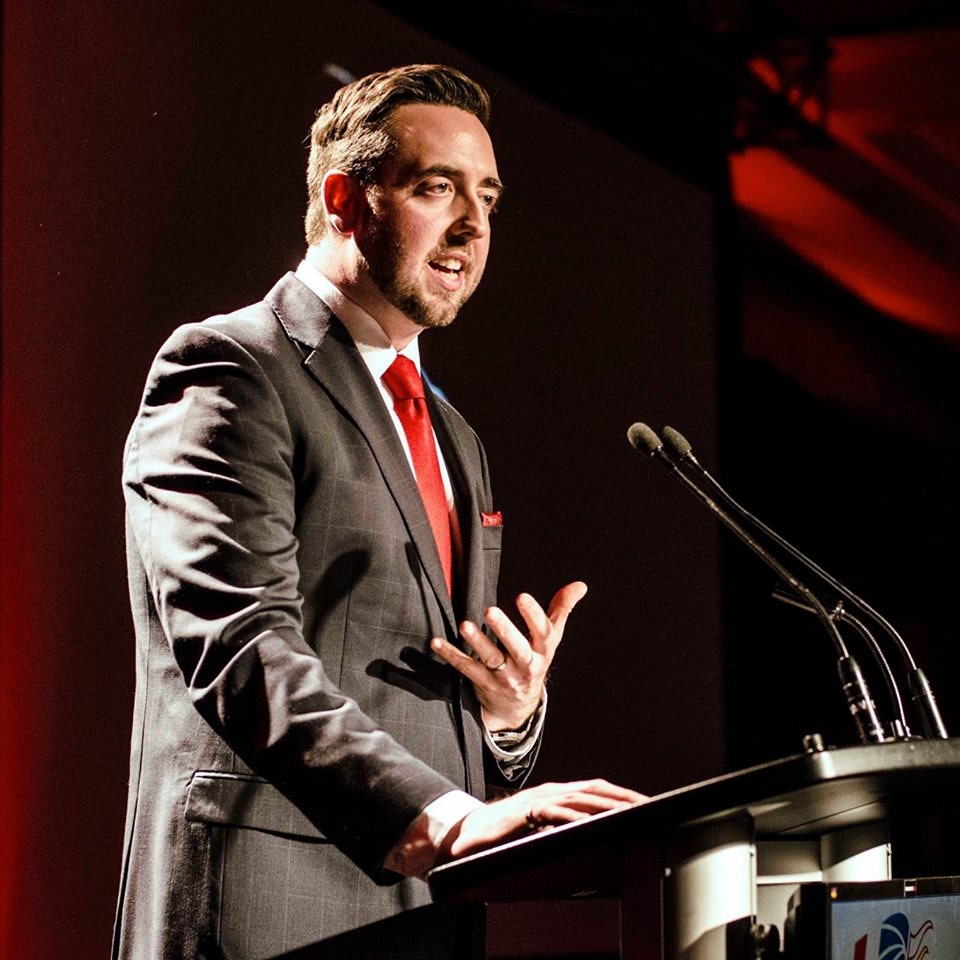
- Parsons speaking to a crowd of supporters in 2014

Member of the Newfoundland and Labrador House of Assembly for Burgeo-La Poile
- In office October 27, 2011 – May 1, 2025
- Preceded by: Kelvin Parsons
- Succeeded by: Michael King

Acting Attorney General
- In office March 11, 2025 – May 1, 2025
- Preceded by: John Hogan
- Succeeded by: John Haggie

Minister of Industry, Energy and Technology
- In office August 19, 2020 – May 1, 2025
- Preceded by: position established
- Succeeded by: Steve Crocker

Attorney General
- In office December 14, 2015 – April 8, 2021
- Preceded by: Felix Collins
- Succeeded by: John Hogan

Minister of Justice and Public Safety
- In office December 14, 2015 – August 19, 2020
- Preceded by: Darin King
- Succeeded by: Steve Crocker

Acting Minister of Environment and Municipal Affairs
- In office April 26, 2018 – November 8, 2018
- Preceded by: Eddie Joyce
- Succeeded by: Graham Letto

Government House Leader
- In office December 14, 2015 – November 22, 2019
- Preceded by: Darin King
- Succeeded by: Siobhan Coady

Minister of Environment
- In office April 26, 2018 – May 30, 2019
- Preceded by: Eddie Joyce
- Succeeded by: Lisa Dempster

Minister of Municipal Affairs
- In office April 26, 2018 – May 30, 2019
- Preceded by: Eddie Joyce
- Succeeded by: Lisa Dempster

Personal details
- Born: 30 May 1979 (age 47) Port aux Basques, Newfoundland and Labrador, Canada
- Party: Liberal
- Occupation: Lawyer

Andrew Parsons ECNL KC (born May 30, 1979) is a Canadian lawyer and former politician. He was elected to the Newfoundland and Labrador House of Assembly in the 2011 provincial election. In 2025 he resigned as a minister and a member.

A member of the Liberal Party of Newfoundland and Labrador, he represented the electoral district of Burgeo-La Poile from 2011 until 2025. He was the Minister of Industry, Energy and Technology in Newfoundland and Labrador at the time of his registration.

Born in Channel-Port Aux Basques, Parsons is the son of Kelvin Parsons, his predecessor as the district's MHA.

== Background ==
Parsons earned a Bachelor of Arts from the University of New Brunswick before receiving a Bachelor of Laws from the University of Saskatchewan College of Law. While in University, Parsons was involved in various extracurricular activities and student associations.

After completing his Bachelor of Laws in 2004, Parsons was called to the Newfoundland and Labrador Bar in 2005, after articling with Ches Crosbie Barristers and Marks & Parsons Law Office. Parsons served as an associate solicitor with Marks and Parsons Law Firm, a general practice located in Port aux Basques, NL. Parsons is a member of the Law Society of NL, but took non-practicing status with the Law Society as of December 31, 2011. He is now practicing as the Attorney General of Newfoundland and Labrador.

Parsons was active within his community and surrounding area. He served on the executive of Port aux Basques Minor Hockey Association for 7 years, including 5 as president), ending in June 2011; served as a committee member for Port aux Basques Come Home Year 2005; served as a member of the Southwest Coast Marine and Mountain Zone Committee, and is currently a board member on the Dr. Charles L. Legrow Health Care Foundation. A former President of the Port aux Basques & Area Chamber of Commerce, Parsons was also one of the people instrumental in reviving junior hockey in Port aux Basques, with the return of the Junior Mariners in 2009.

Parsons served as the chairperson of the Vancouver 2010 Olympic Torch Relay Committee. Parsons served as president of the Port aux Basques Minor Hockey Association for three years and also served as second vice-president two years before that. He was also an organizer of Port aux Basques' bid to become Hockeyville in 2008, the community placed third. Parsons won the Brian Wakelin Executive of the Year Award from Hockey Newfoundland and Labrador in 2008 and was a winner of the Hockey NL Meritorious Service award for 2010. Parsons was also recognized for his contribution to western Newfoundland when he was named to the Top 10 of the Western Star newspaper's top 40 under 40 list for 2010.

== Political career ==
On October 11, 2011, Parsons was elected as the Member of the House of Assembly in the district of Burgeo-La Poile. He was sworn in by Justice Orsborn on October 27, 2011. He served as Official Opposition critic for Advanced Education and Skills; Child, Youth and Family Services; Health and Community Services; and Justice and Attorney General. He also serves as the Deputy Opposition House Leader.

On May 2, 2012, Parsons proposed a private members' resolution for a fixed House of Assembly schedule. The purpose was to establish some stability and semblance of regularity. In Newfoundland and Labrador there is no legislation governing the House of Assembly in terms of when it shall sit.

In the 2015 provincial election, Parsons received nearly 4,000 votes in his district (96.48 per cent of total votes) and no other candidate received more than 100 votes. This is a Canadian record (not including acclamations). He was appointed as Minister of Justice, Attorney General and Government House Leader in Newfoundland and Labrador. Early on in that role, he has worked toward establishing a Drug Treatment Court, expansion of the Family Violence Intervention Court, establishing a Serious Incident Response team as civilian oversight for police, and a pilot program for free legal advice for sexual assault complainants.

Parsons was re-elected in the 2019 provincial election. He subsequently returned to cabinet in the same portfolios. He resigned as Government House Leader in the House of Assembly in November 2019. On August 19, 2020, he was appointed Minister of Industry, Energy and Technology, and Attorney General in the Furey government.

He was re-elected in the 2021 provincial election.

On May 1, 2025, he announced a sudden and immediate resignation from his cabinet post and as an MHA. Previously, he indicated that he would not seek re-election in the 2025 election. His resignation comes just 2 days before a leadership race within his own party. Parsons said that his resignation will not trigger a by-election for Burgeo-LaPoile. Instead, it will be filled in the provincial election.

== Electoral record ==
2021 Newfoundland and Labrador general election: Burgeo-La Poile
Party	Candidate	Votes	%	±%
Liberal	Andrew Parsons	1,992	87.10	+3.64
Progressive Conservative	Ethan Maxwell Wheeler-Park	235	10.28	-6.26
New Democratic	Judy Vanta	60	2.62	
Total valid votes		2,287	99.69	
Total rejected ballots		7	0.31	
Turnout		2,294	33.54	
Eligible voters		6,839		
Liberal hold		Swing		+4.95
Source(s) "Officially Nominated Candidates General Election 2021" (PDF). Elections Newfoundland and Labrador. "NL Election 2021 (Unofficial Results)".

2019 Newfoundland and Labrador general election
Party	Candidate	Votes	%	±%
Liberal	Andrew Parsons	2,947	83.5	
Progressive Conservative	Deborah Ann Turner	584	16.5	
Total valid votes				

Burgeo-La Poile - 2015 Newfoundland and Labrador general election
Party	Candidate	Votes	%	±%
Liberal	Andrew Parsons	3998	96.48%	+44.36
Progressive Conservative	Georgia Darmonkow	93	2.24%	–
New Democratic	Kelly McKeown	53	1.28%	–

Burgeo-La Poile - 2011 Newfoundland and Labrador general election
Party	Candidate	Votes	%	±%
Liberal	Andrew Parsons	2228	52.12%	–
Progressive Conservative	Colin Short	1850	43.27%	–
New Democratic	Matt Fuchs	197	4.16%	–
