= François Bay =

Natural bay in Newfoundland and Labrador, Canada

Coordinates: 47.566°N 56.748°W

Francois Bay (or Fransway Bay) is natural bay on the island of Newfoundland in the province of Newfoundland and Labrador, Canada. It is near Chaleur Bay. The settlement of Francois is located on the bay.
