= Labrador-Grenfell Health =

Health authority in Newfoundland and Labrador

Labrador-Grenfell Health was the governing body for healthcare regulation in an area of the Canadian province of Newfoundland and Labrador. The area included the region of Labrador and the northern and eastern part of the Great Northern Peninsula.

Labrador-Grenfell Health was created on April 1, 2005, with the merger of Health Labrador Corporation and Grenfell Regional Health Services Board.

In the 2022 provincial budget, the Newfoundland and Labrador Government announced its intentions to integrate the existing four health authorities into one entity. Legislation was passed in the House of Assembly approving the amalgamation in November 2022, and Labrador-Grenfell Health became part of Newfoundland and Labrador Health Services on April 3, 2023.
