= Petites =

Ghost town in Newfoundland and Labrador

Coordinates: 47°37′08″N 58°38′02″W

Petites was a small place with 11 families near Rose Blanche, Newfoundland and Labrador, Canada. It had a population of 212 in 1946 and 146 in 1956. It was resettled in 2003.

== See also ==
- List of communities in Newfoundland and Labrador
