= Central Health (Newfoundland and Labrador) =

Central Health was the governing body for healthcare regulation in an area of the Canadian province of Newfoundland and Labrador. The area region included the communities of:

- Fogo Island
- Gander
- Grand Falls-Windsor

In the 2022 provincial budget, the Newfoundland and Labrador Government announced its intentions to integrate the existing four health authorities into one entity. Legislation was passed in the House of Assembly approving the amalgamation in November 2022, and Central Health became part of Newfoundland and Labrador Health Services on April 3, 2023.
