= Sandbanks Provincial Park (Newfoundland) =

Provincial park in Newfoundland, Canada

- IUCN category II (national park)
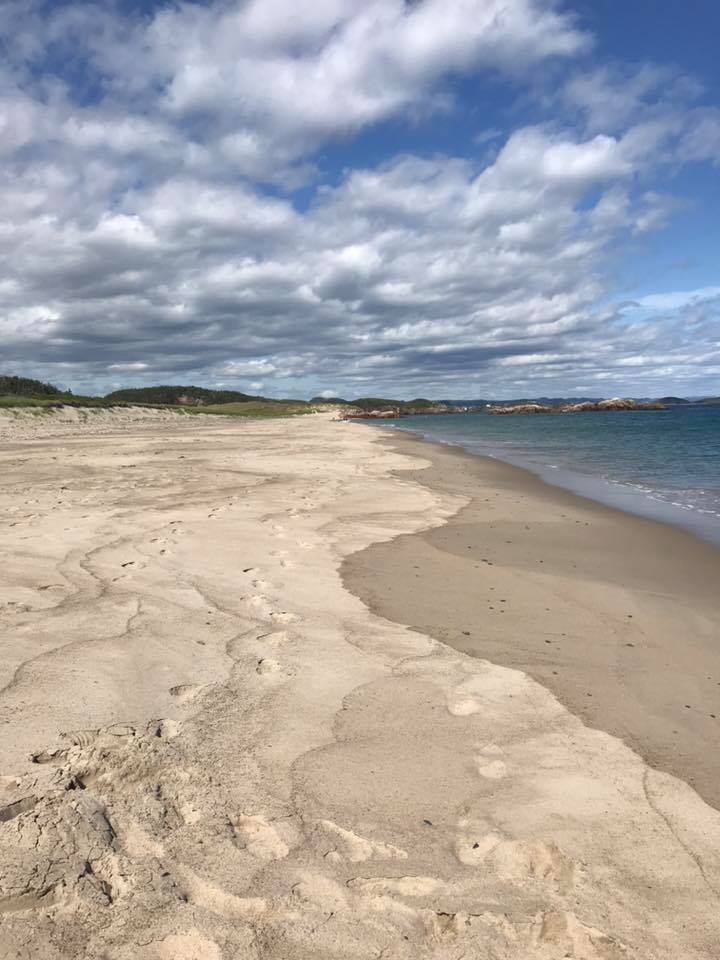
- Looking down Second Beach, Sandbanks Provincial Park, Burgeo, NL

- Location within Newfoundland and Labrador
- Location: Newfoundland and Labrador, Canada
- Nearest city: Burgeo
- Coordinates: 47°36′26″N 57°38′50″W
- Area: 2.32 km^{2} (0.90 sq mi)
- Established: 1985
- Governing body: Government of Newfoundland and Labrador, Department of Tourism, Culture, Industry, and Innovation, Parks Division
- Website: https://www.gov.nl.ca/tcar/parks/p-sp/

Sandbanks Provincial Park is a provincial park on the island of Newfoundland in the province of Newfoundland and Labrador. It is located on the southwest coast, approximately 150 km from the Trans-Canada Highway near the town of Burgeo, less than three hours from Corner Brook. The park is known for its expansive sandy beaches and dunes. The park offers 30 campsites.

Covering an area of 2.32 square kilometres (0.90 sq mi), the park has over seven kilometres (4.3 mi) of beach and several inland hiking trails through bog and forested area. One path leads to a lookout at Cow Head.

== Biology and ecology ==
The sand dunes are easily eroded. Visitors are encouraged to stay on designated trails.

=== Flora ===
Sandbanks is home to Lathyrus japonicus, otherwise known as the beach pea. The fragile sand dunes are covered with beach grass (Ammophila breviligulata).

=== Fauna ===
The piping plover, a near-threatened species of bird, nests on the beaches and in the sand dunes of the park. The park and surrounding area is an important bird migration route.

== Notable visitors ==
Farley Mowat, who lived in Burgeo during the 1960s and wrote several books about the area, often visited the park with his dogs.

Painter Christopher Pratt was a frequent visitor and depicted the beach in the painting West of Sandbanks: Endless Summer.

Newfoundland adventurer, author, and YouTuber Justin Barbour has also spent time at Sandbanks.

== See also ==
- List of protected areas of Newfoundland and Labrador
- List of Canadian protected areas
