= Hybrid power =

Combinations between different technologies to generate electric power

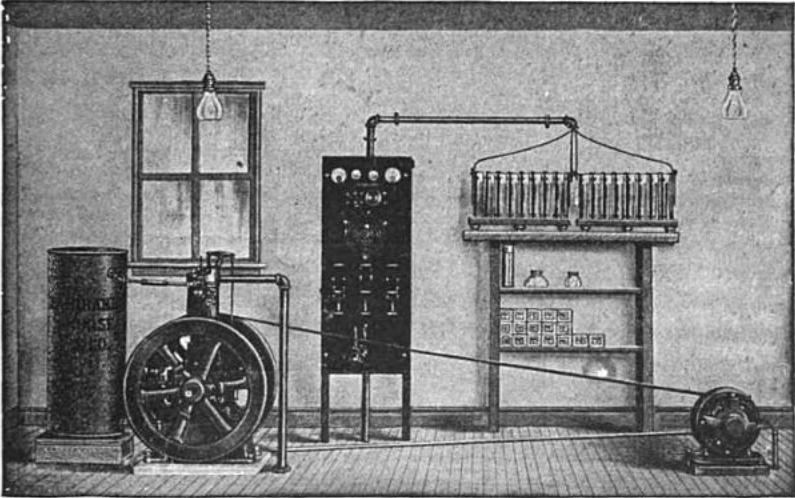
An early hybrid power system. The gasoline/kerosine engine drives the dynamo which charges the storage battery.

Hybrid power are combinations between different technologies to produce power.

In power engineering, the term 'hybrid' describes a combined power and energy storage system.

Examples of power producers used in hybrid power are photovoltaics, wind turbines, and various types of engine-generators – e.g., diesel gen-sets.

Hybrid power plants often contain a renewable energy component (such as PV) that is balanced via a second form of generation or storage such as a diesel genset, fuel cell or battery storage system. They can also provide other forms of power such as heat for some applications.

== Hybrid power system ==
Hybrid systems, as the name implies, combine two or more modes of electricity generation together, usually using renewable technologies such as solar photovoltaic (PV) and wind turbines. Hybrid systems provide a high level of energy security through the mix of generation methods and often will incorporate a storage system (battery, fuel cell) or small fossil fueled generator to ensure maximum supply reliability and security.

Hybrid renewable energy systems are becoming popular as stand-alone power systems for providing electricity in remote areas due to advances in renewable energy technologies and subsequent rise in prices of petroleum products. A hybrid energy system, or hybrid power, usually consists of two or more renewable energy sources used together to provide increased system efficiency as well as greater balance in energy supply.

== Types ==
=== Hydro and solar ===
Floating solar is usually added to existing hydro rather than building both together.

=== Solar and wind ===
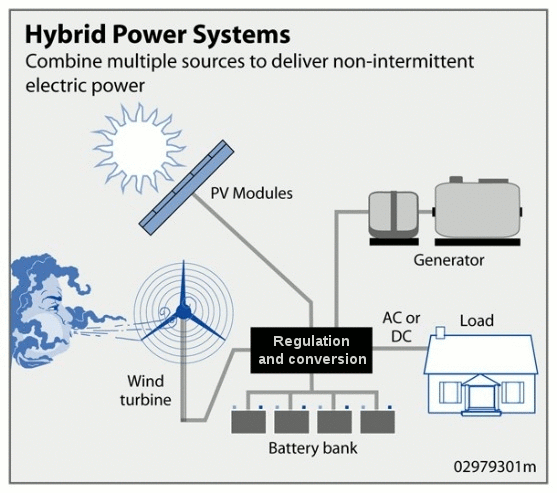
Hybrid solar and wind system

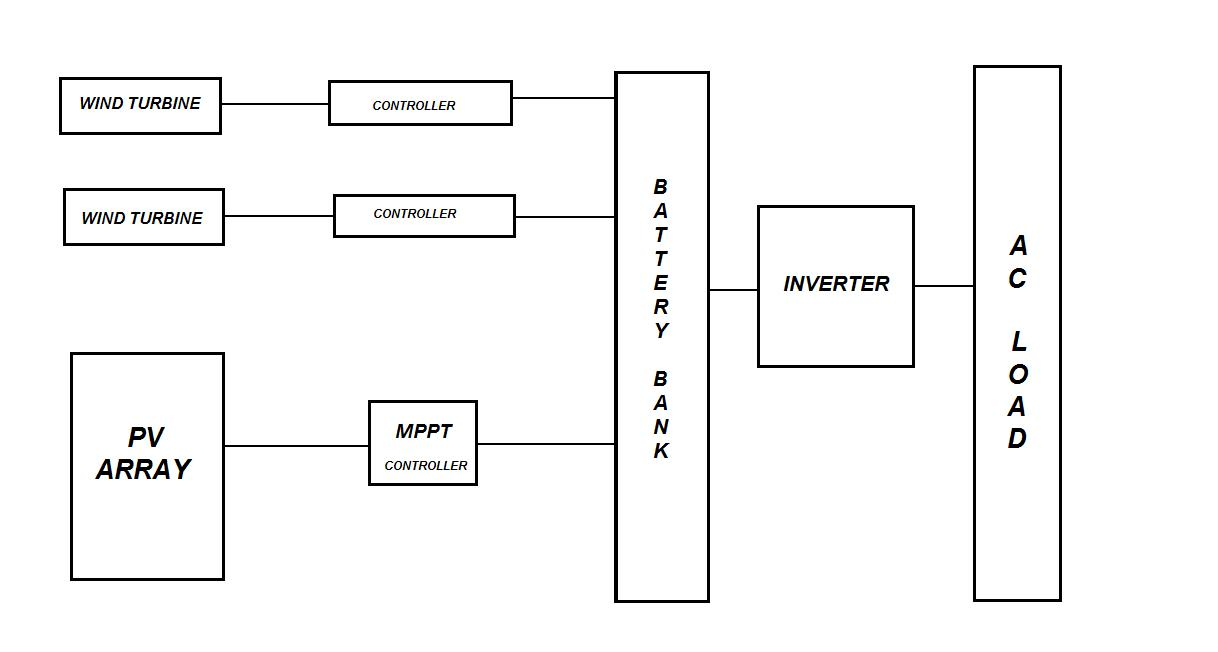
Block diagram of a PV/wind hybrid energy system

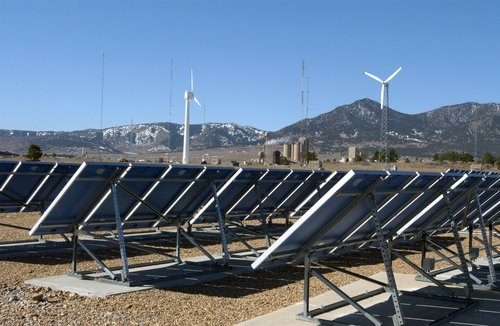
Typical wind and solar hybrid system

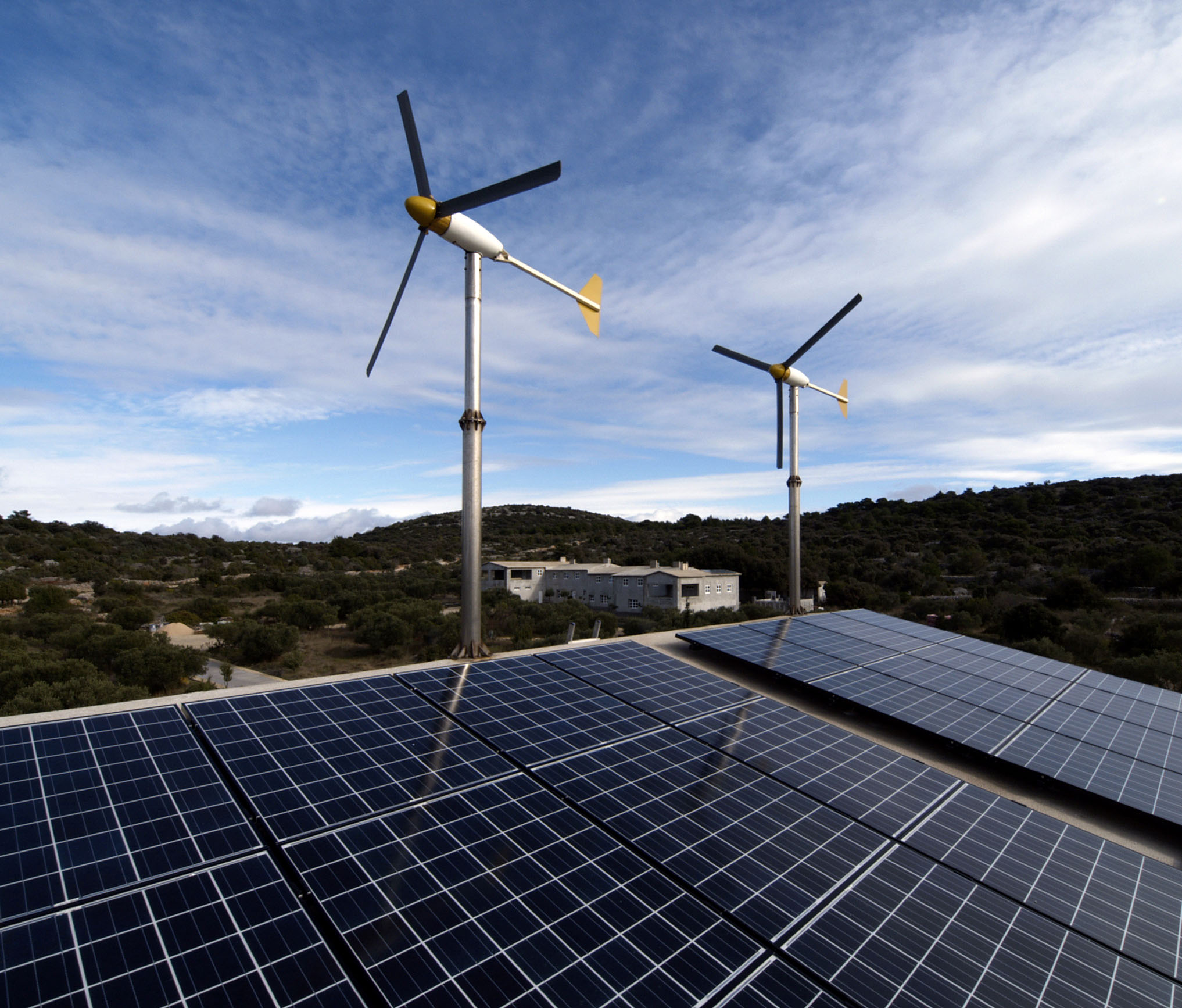
Hybrid on Žirje, Croatia

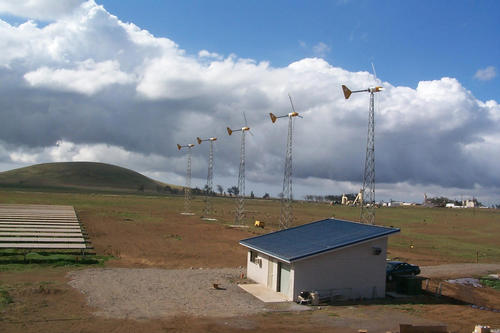
Small wind and solar hybrid system

Another example of a hybrid energy system is a photovoltaic array coupled with a wind turbine. This would create more output from the wind turbine during the winter, whereas during the summer, the solar panels would produce their peak output. Hybrid energy systems often yield greater economic and environmental returns than wind, solar, geothermal or trigeneration stand-alone systems by themselves.

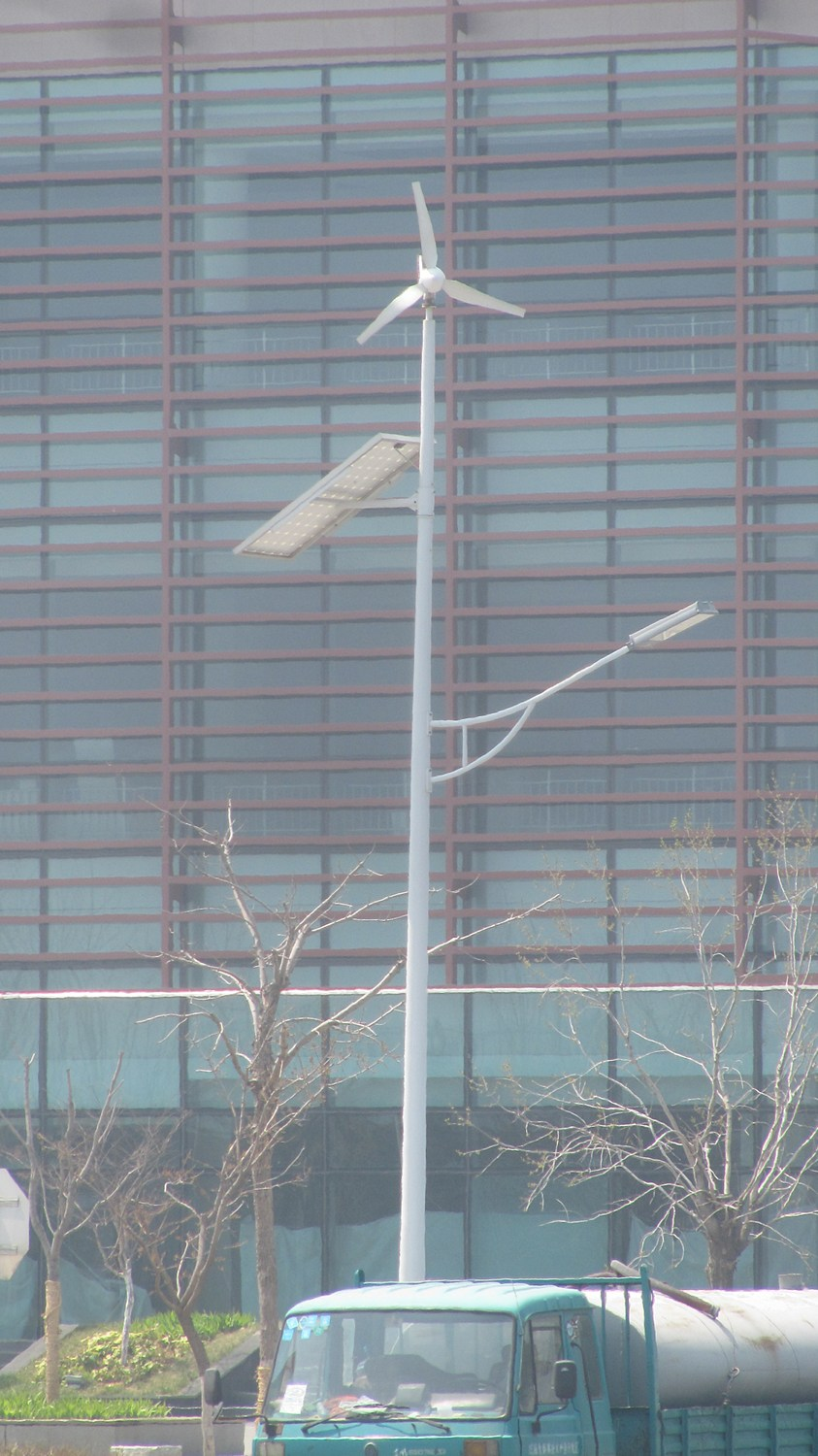
Horizontal axis wind-turbine, combined with a solar panel on a lighting pylon at Weihai, Shandong province, China

Combined use of wind+solar systems results, in many places, in a smoother/cleaner power output since the resources are anti-correlated. Therefore, the combined use of wind and solar systems is crucial for a large-scale grid integration.

In 2019 in western Minnesota, a $5m hybrid system was installed. It runs 500 kW of solar power through the inverter of a 2 MW wind turbine, increasing the capacity factor and reducing costs by $150,000 per year. Purchase contracts limits the local distributor to a 5% maximum of self-generation.

Solar panels on the already existing wind turbines has been tested, but produced blinding rays of light that posed a threat to airplanes. A solution was to produce tinted solar panels that do not reflect as much light. Another proposed design was to have a vertical axis wind turbine coated in solar cells that are able to absorb sunlight from any angle.

Other solar hybrids include solar-wind systems. The combination of wind and solar has the advantage that the two sources complement each other because the peak operating times for each system occur at different times of the day and year. The power generation of such a hybrid system is more constant and fluctuates less than each of the two component subsystems. The world’s largest renewable energy park of 30 GW solar-wind hybrid capacity is under installation in Gujarat.

=== Hydro and wind ===
A wind-hydro system generates electric energy combining wind turbines and pumped storage. The combination has been the subject of long-term discussion, and an experimental plant, which also tested wind turbines, was implemented by Nova Scotia Power at its Wreck Cove hydro electric power site in the late 1970s, but was decommissioned within ten years. Since, no other system has been implemented at a single location as of late 2010.

Wind-hydro stations dedicate all, or a significant portion, of their wind power resources to pumping water into pumped storage reservoirs. These reservoirs are an implementation of grid energy storage.

Wind and its generation potential is inherently variable. However, when this energy source is used to pump water into reservoirs at an elevation (the principle behind pumped storage), the potential energy of the water is relatively stable and can be used to generate electrical power by releasing it into a hydropower plant when needed. The combination has been described as particularly suited to islands that are not connected to larger grids.

During the 1980s, an installation was proposed in the Netherlands. The IJsselmeer would be used as the reservoir, with wind turbines located on its dike. Feasibility studies have been conducted for installations on the island of Ramea (Newfoundland and Labrador) and on the Lower Brule Indian Reservation (South Dakota).

An installation at Ikaria Island, Greece, had entered the construction phase as of 2010.

The island of El Hierro is where the first world's first wind-hydro power station is expected to be complete. Current TV called this "a blueprint for a sustainable future on planet Earth". It was designed to cover between 80-100% of the island's power and was set to be operational in 2012. However, these expectations were not realized in practice, probably due to inadequate reservoir volume and persistent problems with grid stability.

100% renewable energy systems require an over-capacity of wind or solar power.

=== Solar PV and solar thermal ===
Though Solar PV generates cheaper intermittent power during the day light time, it needs the support of sustainable power generation sources to provide round the clock power. Solar thermal plants with thermal storage are clean sustainable power generation to supply electricity round the clock. They can cater the load demand perfectly and work as base load power plants when the extracted solar energy is found excess in a day. Proper mix of solar thermal (thermal storage type) and solar PV can fully match the load fluctuations without the need of costly battery storage.

During the day time, the additional auxiliary power consumption of a solar thermal storage power plant is nearly 10% of its rated capacity for the process of extracting solar energy in the form of thermal energy. This auxiliary power requirement can be made available from cheaper solar PV plant by envisaging hybrid solar plant with a mix of solar thermal and solar PV plants at a site. Also to optimise the cost of power, generation can be from the cheaper solar PV plant (33% generation) during the day light whereas the rest of the time in a day is from the solar thermal storage plant (67% generation from Solar power tower and parabolic trough types) for meeting 24 hours base load operation. When solar thermal storage plant is forced to idle due to lack of sunlight locally during cloudy days in monsoon season, it is also possible to consume (similar to a lesser efficient, huge capacity and low cost battery storage system) the cheap surplus / infirm power from solar PV, wind and hydro power plants by heating the hot molten salt to higher temperature for converting stored thermal energy in to electricity during the peak demand hours when the electricity sale price is profitable.

=== Solar PV, battery and grid ===
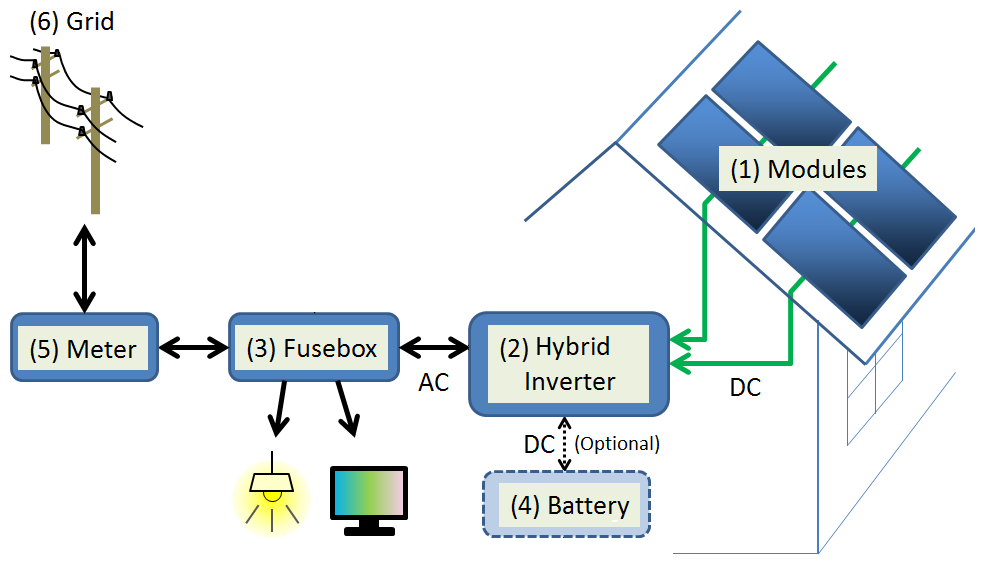
System diagram of intelligent hybrid inverters used in a domestic setting

Solar PV gives variable output which can be buffered with battery storage. However, large variations exist in production over the day, as well in many places seasonally. The battery helps match the power with the load. A hybrid solar inverter additionally allows the storage of low cost electricity drawn down on cheap tariffs. Stores excess solar energy and supplies power during low generation or outages, ensuring a reliable and continuous energy supply while helping to save electricity costs.

In 2024, USA has 288 solar+battery power plants with a storage capacity at 7.8 GW power and 24.2 GWh energy.

=== Wind-hydrogen system ===
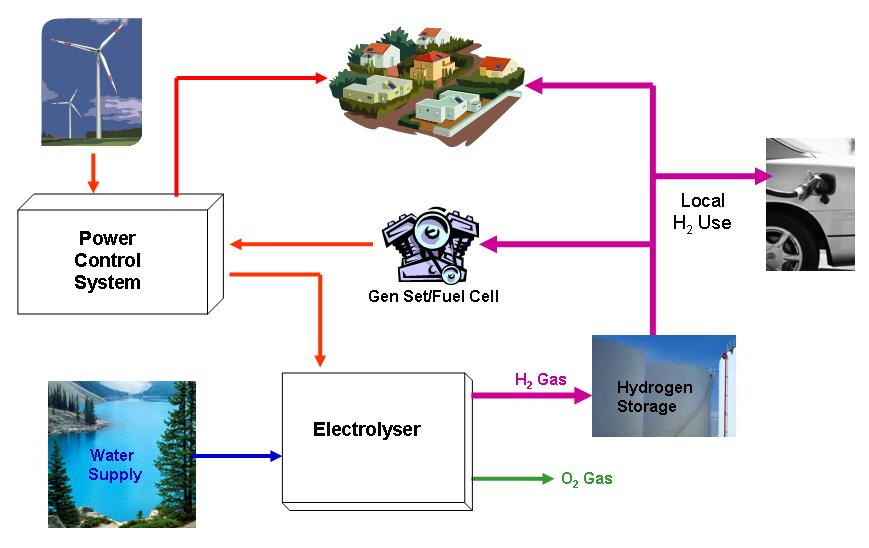

One method of storing wind energy is the production of hydrogen through the electrolysis of water. This hydrogen is subsequently used to generate electricity during periods when demand can not be matched by wind alone. The energy in the stored hydrogen can be converted into electrical power through fuel cell technology or a combustion engine linked to an electrical generator.

Successfully storing hydrogen has many issues which need to be overcome, such as embrittlement of the materials used in the power system.

This technology is being developed in many countries. In 2007, technology test sites included:

Community	Country	Wind MW
Ramea, Newfoundland and Labrador	Newfoundland, Canada	0.3
Prince Edward Island Wind-Hydrogen Village	PEI, Canada	0.125
Lolland	Denmark	
Minot	North Dakota, US	
Koluel Kaike	Santa Cruz, Argentina	
Ladymoor Renewable Energy Project (LREP)	Scotland	
Hunterston Hydrogen Project	Scotland	
RES2H2	Greece	0.50
Unst	Scotland	0.03
Utsira	Norway	0.60

=== Wind and diesel ===
A wind-diesel hybrid power system combines diesel generators and wind turbines, usually alongside ancillary equipment such as energy storage, power converters, and various control components, to generate electricity. They are designed to increase capacity and reduce the cost and environmental impact of electrical generation in remote communities and facilities that are not linked to a power grid. Wind-diesel hybrid systems reduce reliance on diesel fuel, which creates pollution and is costly to transport.

Recently, in Northern Canada wind-diesel hybrid power systems were built by the mining industry. In remote locations at Lac de Gras, in Canada's Northwest Territories, and Katinniq, Ungava Peninsula, Nunavik, two systems are used to save fuel at mines. There is another system in Argentina.

=== Combined cycle hydrogen power plant ===
Renewable and conventional energy production in Germany over two weeks in 2022. In hours with low wind and PV production, hard coal and gas fill the gap. Nuclear and biomass show almost no flexibility. PV follows the increased consumption during daytime hours but varies seasonally.

Wind and solar power are variable renewable energy sources that aren't as consistent as base load energy and a combined cycle hydrogen power plant could help renewables by capturing excess energy, with electrolysis, when they produce too much so it can fill the gaps when they aren't producing enough.

=== Other hybrid power systems ===
At power stations that use compressed air energy storage (CAES), electrical energy is used to compress air and store it in underground facilities such as caverns or abandoned mines. During later periods of high electrical demand, the air is released to power turbines, generally using supplemental natural gas. Power stations that make significant use of CAES are operational in McIntosh, Alabama, Germany, and Japan. System disadvantages include some energy losses in the CAES process; also, the need for supplemental use of fossil fuels such as natural gas means that these systems do not completely make use of renewable energy.

The Iowa Stored Energy Park, projected to begin commercial operation in 2015, will use wind farms in Iowa as an energy source in conjunction with CAES.

Combining solar and geothermal is also possible.

=== Solar and diesel ===
A common type is a photovoltaic diesel hybrid system, combining photovoltaics (PV) and diesel generators, or diesel gensets, as PV has hardly any marginal cost and is treated with priority on the grid. The diesel gensets are used to constantly fill in the gap between the present load and the actual generated power by the PV system.

As solar energy is fluctuating, and the generation capacity of the diesel genesets is limited to a certain range, it is often a viable option to include battery storage in order to optimize solar's contribution to the overall generation of the hybrid system.

The best business cases for diesel reduction with solar and wind energy can normally be found in remote locations because these sites are often not connected to the grid and transport of diesel over long distances is expensive. Many of these applications can be found in the mining sector, on mountains for radio and data communication systems and on islands.

The diesel generators are mostly required to start at night, when the photovoltaic strings do not provide charge to the batteries. In Alpine regions, this can be very problematic as diesel engines are not good at starting and taking load at low temperatures. This often cause start failures. Diesel engines are usually electrically pre-heated in standby configurations. An electric preheater cannot be applied in solar-diesel hybrid power systems, as the preheater will consume too much charge from the battery system.

In 2015, a case-study conducted in seven countries concluded that in all cases generating costs can be reduced by hybridising mini-grids and isolated grids. However, financing costs for diesel-powered electricity grids with solar photovoltaics are crucial and largely depend on the ownership structure of the power plant. While cost reductions for state-owned utilities can be significant, the study also identified short-term economic benefits to be insignificant or even negative for non-public utilities, such as independent power producers, given historical costs at the time of the study.

=== More than two energy sources ===
Adding wave power to wind and solar may be possible.

== See also ==
- Distributed generation
- List of energy storage power plants
- Photovoltaic thermal hybrid solar collector
- Stand-alone power system
