= Burnt Islands, Newfoundland and Labrador =

Burnt Islands
- Town
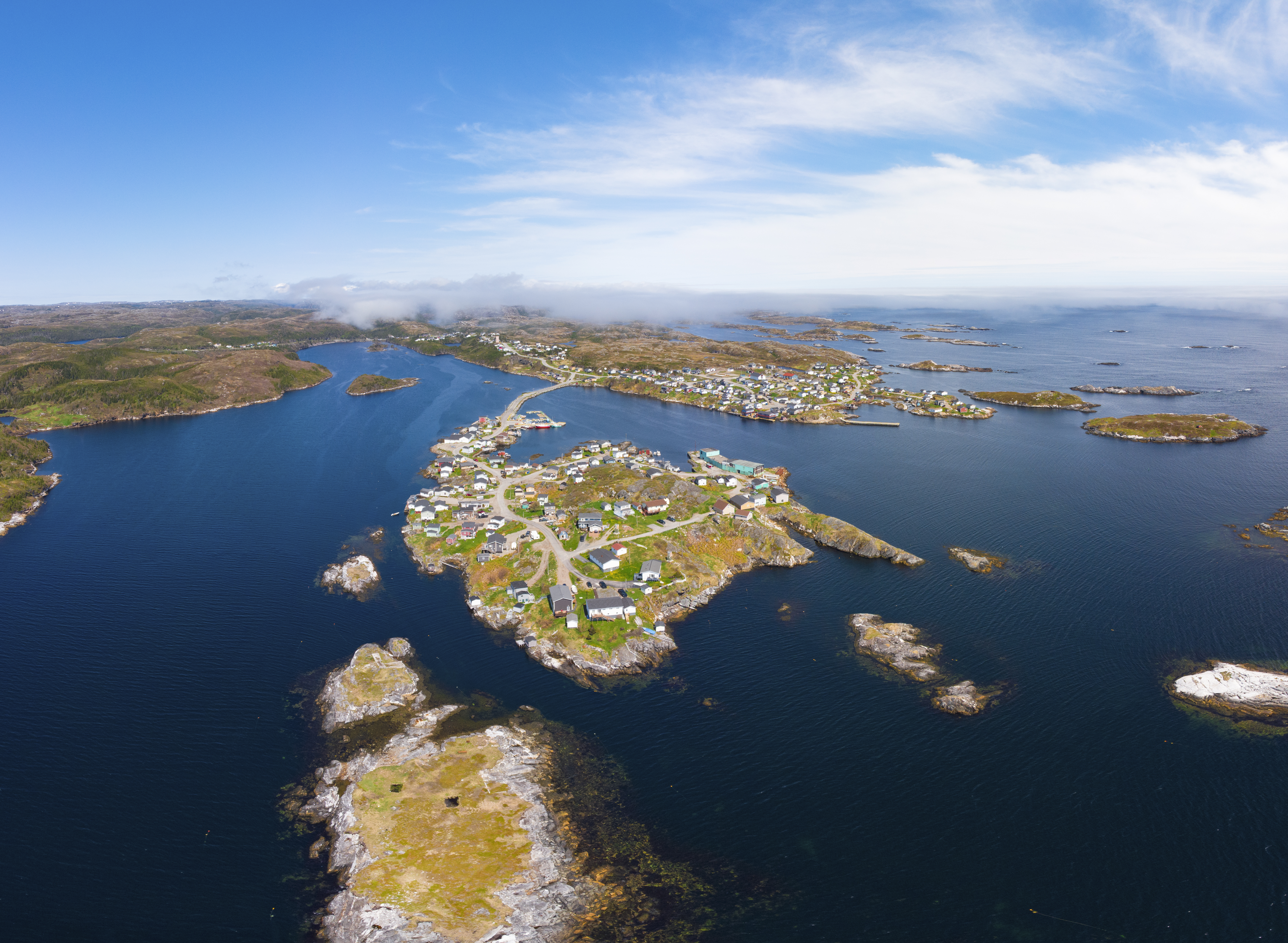
- Burnt Islands aerial view

- Location of Burnt Islands in Newfoundland
- Coordinates: 47°35′50.40″N 58°53′07.84″W
- Country: Canada
- Province: Newfoundland and Labrador

Government
  - Mayor: Paul Strickland

Area
  - Land: 9.52 km^{2} (3.68 sq mi)

Population (2026)
  - Total: 525
  - Density: 65.3/km^{2} (169/sq mi)
- Time zone: UTC-3:30 (Newfoundland Time)
  - Summer (DST): UTC-2:30 (Newfoundland Daylight)
- Area code: 709
- Highways: Route 470
- Website: burntislandsnl.ca
- Colombier Islands Lighthouse
- Constructed: 1929 (fog alarm)
- Foundation: concrete base
- Construction: aluminium skeletal tower
- Height: 11 m (36 ft)
- Shape: quadrangular skeletal tower with balcony and lantern
- Power source: solar power
- Operator: Canadian Coast Guard
- Fog signal: 1 blast every 30s.
- First lit: 1971 (current tower)
- Focal height: 18 m (59 ft)
- Range: 15 nmi (28 km; 17 mi)
- Characteristic: Fl W 5s

Burnt Islands is a small coastal community found in God Bay on the southwest coast of Newfoundland, Canada.

== Geography ==
The community is 27 kilometres (17 mi) east from Port-aux-Basques. This community consists of an "island" section and a "main" section that were connected by a causeway in 1969. The community is built on the rocky, barren coastline of the harbour. The countryside consists largely of bogs and marshes with many species of plant and animal life native to Newfoundland being present.

== History ==
Burnt Islands, like many Newfoundland coastal communities, developed around the fishery. The sheltered harbour and proximity to rich fishing grounds were the principal factors in attracting early fishermen to this area between 1839 and 1841. The first recorded settlers settled on what is locally known as the "Main" in 1839, while families settled the "Island" in 1841.

Throughout the late 19th century and well into the 20th century the community continued to thrive with many business firms establishing in the area providing goods, services and employment for people in the area. The community supported a lumber and glue industry at one time.

In 1968 the first fish processing plant was started by Eric King fisheries, employing a large number of the towns residents and continuing to do so to the present day. Also it was in 1969 that the two main areas of settlement were linked together by a causeway, making it the community of Burnt Islands.

In 1991, Alan Handel Productions and the National Film Board of Canada produced the documentary A Passage from Burnt Islands, about education and literacy in this community.

== Climate ==
The climate for Burnt Islands is a maritime climate which consists of fairly cool weather in the summer and somewhat mild temperatures in the winter caused by the moderating effects of the nearby ocean. This area of the southwest coast is well known for its infamous winds that sometimes gust over 150 km per hour.

== Demographics ==
Historical populations Burnt Islands, NL
Year	Pop.	±%
1996	919	—
2001	801	−12.8%
2006	703	−12.2%
2011	651	−7.4%
2016	622	−4.5%
2021	540	−13.2%

In the 2021 Census of Population conducted by Statistics Canada, Burnt Islands had a population of 540 living in 235 of its 251 total private dwellings, a change of −13.2% from its 2016 population of 622. With a land area of 9.48 km^{2} (3.66 sq mi), it had a population density of 57.0/km^{2} (147.5/sq mi) in 2021.

== Transportation ==
The community is linked to the Trans Canada Highway by route 470 at Port aux Basques. From Port aux Basques, known as the Gateway to Newfoundland, Burnt Islands is linked by the Marine Atlantic ferries to Nova Scotia and mainland Canada.

== Notable people ==
- Michael King, Canadian politician

== See also ==
- List of lighthouses in Canada
