= Ramea =

- Town
- Location of Ramea in Newfoundland
- Coordinates: 47°31′10.29″N 57°24′04.28″W
- Country: Canada
- Province: Newfoundland and Labrador
- Census division: 3
- Settled: c. 1805
- Incorporated (town): March 20, 1951

Government
  - Mayor: Ian Stewart
  - MHA: Micheal King (Burgeo-LaPoile)
  - MP: Carol Anstey (Long Range Mountains)

Area
  - Total: 1.89 km^{2} (0.73 sq mi)

Population (2021)
  - Total: 388
- Time zone: UTC-3:30 (Newfoundland Time)
  - Summer (DST): UTC-2:30 (Newfoundland Daylight)
- Postal Code: A0N 2J0
- Area code: 709
- Highways: Ferry to Burgeo; Ferry to Grey River

Ramea is a small village in Newfoundland and Labrador located on Northwest Island, one of a group of five major islands located off the south coast of Newfoundland, Canada. The island is approximately 3.14 km long by 0.93 km wide (1.95 miles by 0.58 miles). The other major islands in the archipelago are Great (or Big) Island, Middle Island, Harbour Island, and South West Island.

Ramea is inaccessible by road and is serviced by an intra-provincial ferry in Burgeo.

== History ==
The community, originally settled in the early 19th century for its proximity to rich fishing grounds and safe anchorages, was once a thriving fishing village. The town of Ramea was incorporated in 1951. It was probably named for Le Ramée, a street in Saint Peter Port, the capital of Guernsey.

From 1949 to 1970, businesswoman Marie Penny owned and operated John Penny & Sons, one of the largest frozen fish companies in Newfoundland during the 20th century. Since the cod moratorium of 1992, the isolated community has struggled to survive, having declined to about 50% of its peak population of 1,120 in the 1970s.

In 1993, St. Boniface All Grade School, the only school in the community, burnt down. The school was later rebuilt.

A Come Home Year for Ramea was held in 2009.

Ramea is home to a large number of plants, which include the purple pitcher plant and bakeapple. Furthermore, the island and surrounding islands serve as a fall and winter home to many migratory seabirds.

=== Wind energy ===
In 2004, Ramea was chosen for the site of Canada's first wind-diesel demonstration project was completed with the support of CETC-Ottawa. Six 65 kW wind turbines were installed on the island of Ramea, Newfoundland. The objective of the project was to demonstrate that the Wind-Diesel Integrated Control System (WDICS) can be used to displace diesel power generation by introducing wind to the island's grid and to show significant energy efficiency and reliability for northern, remote or isolated locations.

The wind-diesel pilot program generates around 400,000 kWh electricity annually.

Ramea was selected as the pilot site for a Wind-Hydrogen power system. The project is being undertaken by Newfoundland and Labrador Hydro in partnership with Natural Resources Canada, Memorial University, University of New Brunswick and Frontier Power Systems.

The wind-hydrogen system was due for completion in April 2010. In 2018 it was reported that the project was experiencing difficulties and was shut down.

== Demographics ==
In the 2021 Census of Population conducted by Statistics Canada, Ramea had a population of 388 living in 206 of its 207 total private dwellings, a change of −13.2% from its 2016 population of 447. With a land area of 1.86 km^{2} (0.72 sq mi), it had a population density of 208.6/km^{2} (540.3/sq mi) in 2021.

== Activities ==
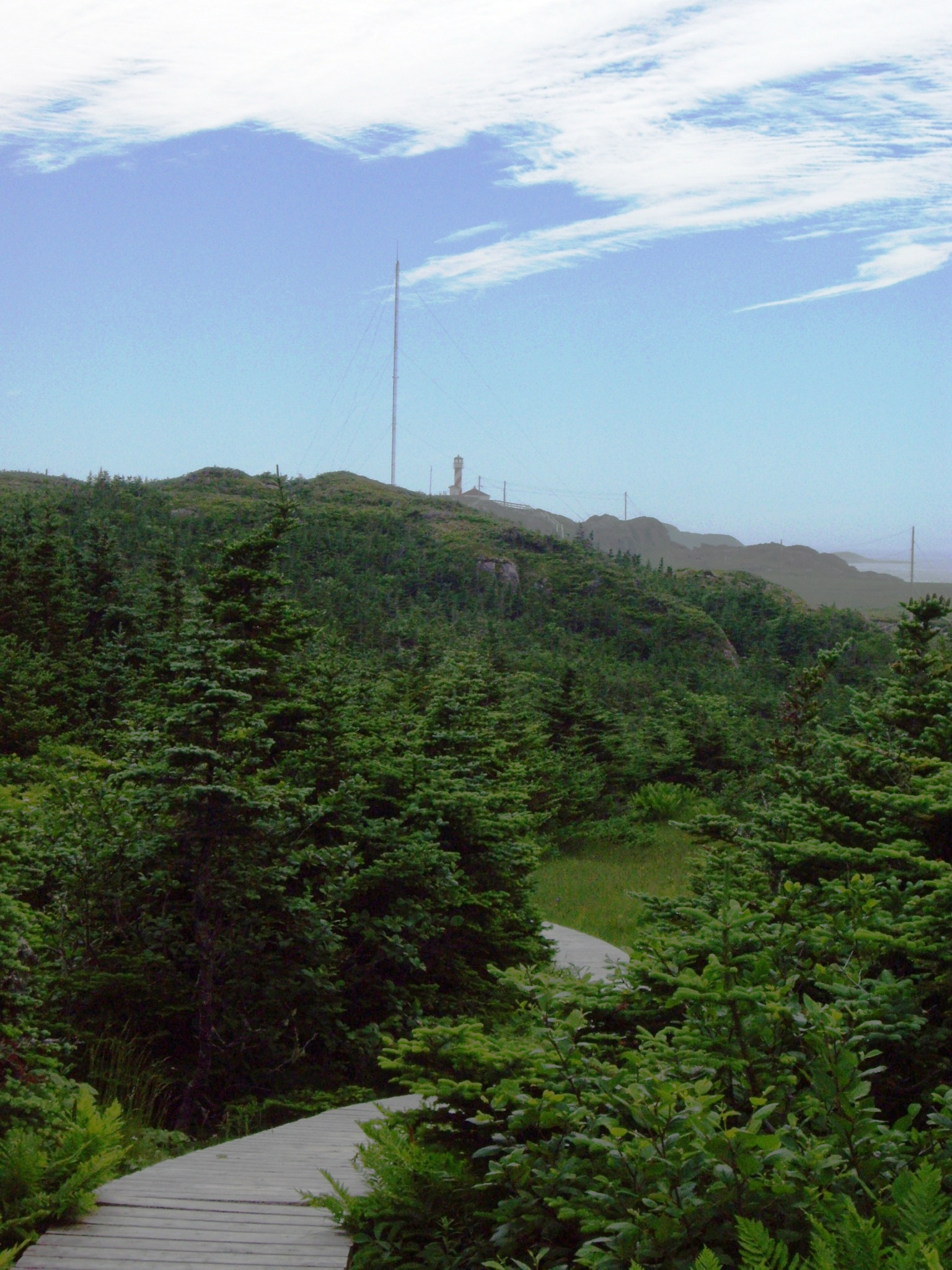

There are a number of walks on the island. The walk also includes the wind-diesel plant.

Walking to the island's highest point on top of Man O'War Hill offers excellent views of archipelago and across to White Bear Bay.

Every year the islands host to a traditional music festival on the second weekend of August.

Hunting of different species of seabirds, such as Eider Ducks and Murres (Turres).

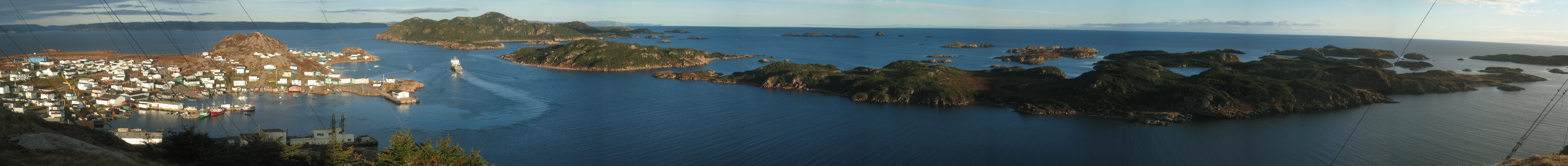

== Neighbouring communities ==
West - Burgeo East - Grey River

== See also ==
- List of cities and towns in Newfoundland and Labrador
- Ramea Islands
