= Francois, Newfoundland and Labrador =

Francois
- Local service district / designated place
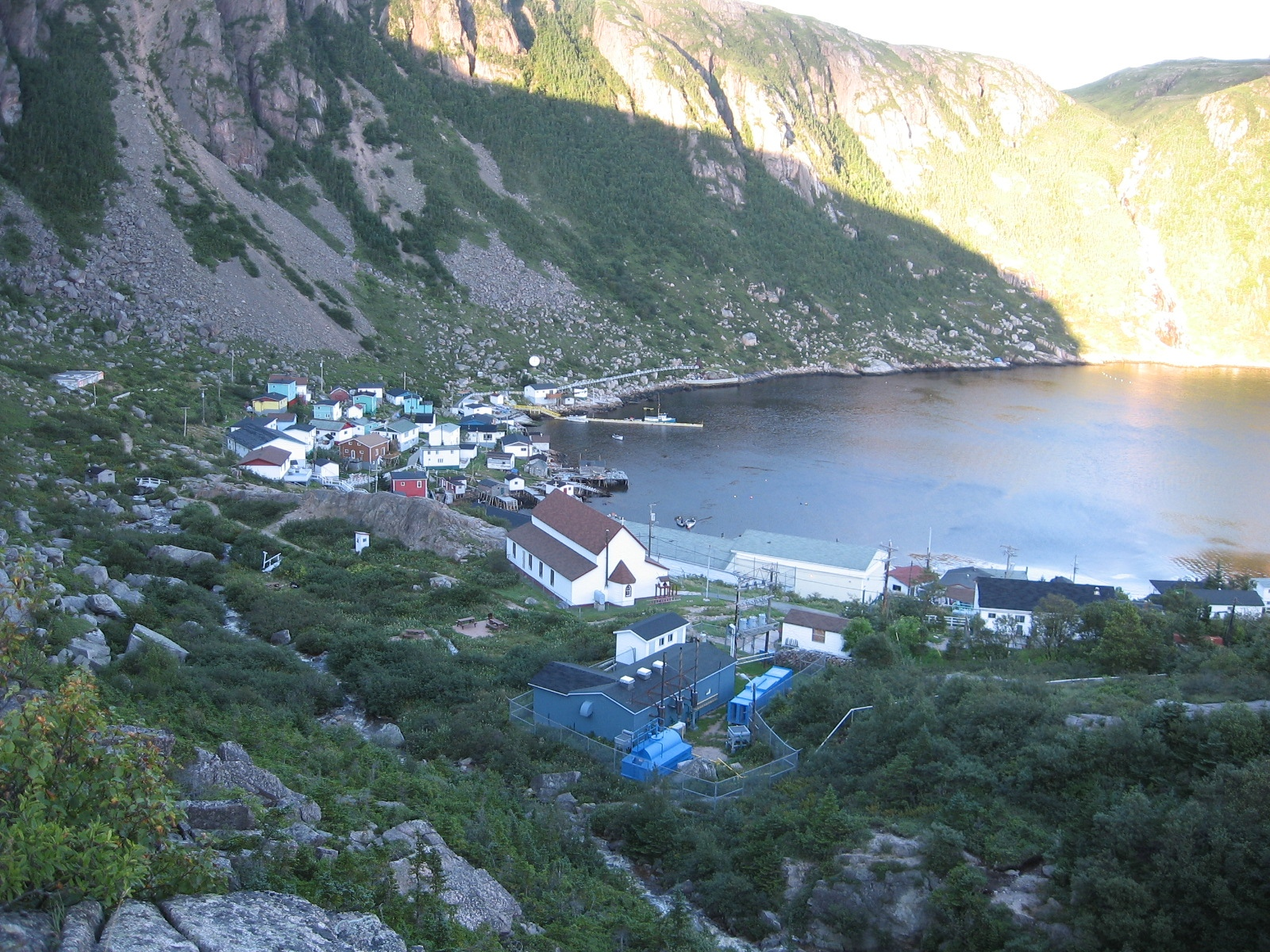
- Nickname: "Fransway"
- Location of Francois in Newfoundland
- Coordinates: 47°34′6″N 56°44′30″W
- Country: Canada
- Province: Newfoundland and Labrador

Population (2021)
  - Total: 64
- Time zone: UTC-3:30 (Newfoundland Time)
  - Summer (DST): UTC-2:30 (Newfoundland Daylight)
- Area code: 709
- Highways: Ferry to Burgeo

Francois (/frænˈsweɪ/ fran-SWAY) is a local service district and designated place in the Canadian province of Newfoundland and Labrador. It is located on the southern coast of Newfoundland on Francois Bay at the end of a small fjord. Although there is no longer a general store, there is a post office and a small museum, accessed by concrete pathways and boardwalks. Most residents pronounce the name "Fran-sway", and its proper spelling is without the cedilla found in the French word françois.

Francois is inaccessible by road and may be reached only by air or sea.

== History ==
The community was first settled in the 1700s, and resisted the government resettlement programs of the mid 20th century, though it reconsidered and rejected resettlement in 2013 and again in 2021.

== Geography ==
Francois is in Newfoundland within Subdivision E of Division No. 3. It is located on the southern coast of Newfoundland on Francois Bay at the end of a small fjord. The community is approximately 36 km east of the community of Grey River.

== Demographics ==
As a designated place in the 2021 Census of Population conducted by Statistics Canada, Francois recorded a population of 64 living in 28 of its 47 total private dwellings, a change of −28.1% from its 2016 population of 89. With a land area of 5.09 km^{2} (1.97 sq mi), it had a population density of 17.5/km^{2} (45.3/sq mi) in 2016.

== Government ==
Francois is a local service district (LSD) that is governed by a committee responsible for the provision of certain services to the community. The chair of the LSD committee is Austin Fudge.

== Transportation ==
There is no road to the village, which can only be accessed by boat and helicopter, and snowmobile in the winter. Francois is serviced by an intra-provincial ferry in Burgeo.

== See also ==
- List of communities in Newfoundland and Labrador
- List of designated places in Newfoundland and Labrador
- List of local service districts in Newfoundland and Labrador
- Newfoundland outport
