= Bill Ramsay (politician) =

Canadian businessman and politician

William F. Ramsay (born May 26, 1962) is a former politician in Newfoundland. He represented La Poile and then Burgeo-La Poile in the Newfoundland House of Assembly from 1989 to 1999.

The son of William Ramsay and Eileen Norma Beauchamp, he was born in Port aux Basques and was educated at Memorial University and Carleton University. In 1989, he married Leona Jane Jacqueline. He was sales manager for Beauchamp Hardware from 1982 to 1984. Ramsay was owner of Audio Express Ltd. in Corner Brook. He worked as a life insurance underwriter for Mutual of Omaha from 1987 to 1989 and for North American Life Assurance from 1989 to 1990.

He was elected to the Newfoundland assembly in 1989 and was reelected in 1993 and 1996. Ramsay did not run for reelection in 1999.
