= Burgeo =

- Town
- Flag

- Location of Burgeo in Newfoundland
- Coordinates: 47°37′12″N 57°37′18″W
- Country: Canada
- Province: Newfoundland and Labrador

Government
  - Mayor: Trevor Green
  - MHA: Michael King (Burgeo-LaPoile)
  - MP: Carol Anstey (Long Range Mountains)

Population (2021)
  - Total: 1,176
- Time zone: UTC-03:30 (NST)
  - Summer (DST): UTC-02:30 (NDT)
- Area code: 709
- Highways: Route 480

Burgeo (/ˈbɜːrdʒoʊ/ BUR-joh) is a town in the Canadian province of Newfoundland and Labrador. It is located mainly on Grandy Island, on the south coast of the island of Newfoundland. It is an outport community.

The town is approximately 121 km (75 mi) east of Channel-Port aux Basques. Burgeo is home to Sandbanks Provincial Park, named for its sand dunes and long expanses of flat, sandy beaches.

== Demographics ==
In the 2021 Census of Population conducted by Statistics Canada, Burgeo had a population of 1,176 living in 571 of its 660 total private dwellings, a change of −10% from its 2016 population of 1,307. With a land area of 29.51 km^{2} (11.39 sq mi), it had a population density of 39.9/km^{2} (103.2/sq mi) in 2021.

The population was 900 in 1911, 2,474 in 1976, 1,607 in 2006, 1,464 in 2011, and 1,307 in 2016. The median age in the town was 60 in 2021.

== Economy ==
The principal industry was fishing and fish processing until the town was one of many affected by the 1992 cod moratorium. As such, the moratorium caused excessive outmigration.

== Transport links ==
Burgeo has a ferry dock with connections to Ramea, Grey River and Francois. The town is also the southern terminus for Route 480 (Burgeo Highway), connecting Burgeo with the Trans-Canada Highway (Route 1) and the rest of mainland Newfoundland.

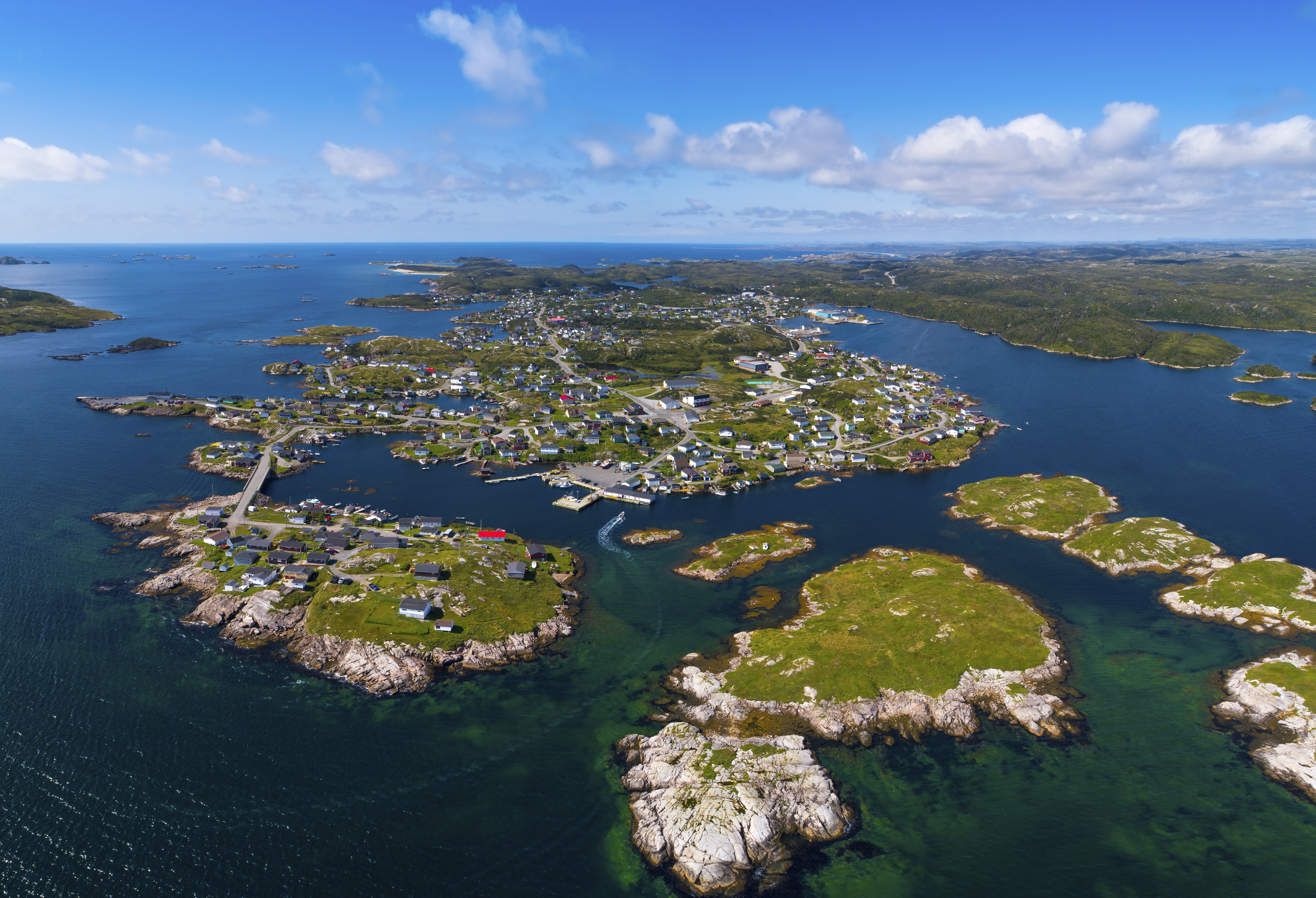
Aerial view of Burgeo Islands

== Climate ==
Burgeo has a subarctic climate (Dfc) with long, cold winters and short, cool summers. Precipitation is heavy year round.

Climate data for Burgeo Coordinates 47°37′N 57°37′W; elevation: 12 m (39 ft); 1961–1990, extremes 1966–present)
Month	Jan	Feb	Mar	Apr	May	Jun	Jul	Aug	Sep	Oct	Nov	Dec	Year
Record high °C (°F)	8.7 (47.7)	8.9 (48.0)	9.2 (48.6)	14.8 (58.6)	21.7 (71.1)	24.4 (75.9)	25.9 (78.6)	26.7 (80.1)	23.1 (73.6)	18.6 (65.5)	14.4 (57.9)	11.5 (52.7)	26.7 (80.1)
Mean daily maximum °C (°F)	−1.4 (29.5)	−2 (28)	0.5 (32.9)	4.5 (40.1)	8.8 (47.8)	12.6 (54.7)	16.5 (61.7)	18.1 (64.6)	15.2 (59.4)	10.3 (50.5)	5.8 (42.4)	1.3 (34.3)	7.5 (45.5)
Daily mean °C (°F)	−4.9 (23.2)	−5.6 (21.9)	−2.9 (26.8)	1.5 (34.7)	5.6 (42.1)	9.5 (49.1)	13.6 (56.5)	14.8 (58.6)	11.6 (52.9)	6.9 (44.4)	2.8 (37.0)	−2.0 (28.4)	4.2 (39.6)
Mean daily minimum °C (°F)	−8.4 (16.9)	−9.4 (15.1)	−6.4 (20.5)	−1.5 (29.3)	2.4 (36.3)	6.4 (43.5)	10.5 (50.9)	11.4 (52.5)	7.8 (46.0)	3.4 (38.1)	−0.3 (31.5)	−5.4 (22.3)	0.9 (33.6)
Record low °C (°F)	−19.4 (−2.9)	−25.6 (−14.1)	−25.2 (−13.4)	−12.2 (10.0)	−7.2 (19.0)	1.1 (34.0)	4.4 (39.9)	3.9 (39.0)	−0.6 (30.9)	−4.7 (23.5)	−12.9 (8.8)	−18.3 (−0.9)	−25.6 (−14.1)
Average precipitation mm (inches)	156.7 (6.17)	130.5 (5.14)	128.1 (5.04)	131.6 (5.18)	125.2 (4.93)	149.3 (5.88)	139.9 (5.51)	138.5 (5.45)	133.2 (5.24)	156.9 (6.18)	175.5 (6.91)	173.8 (6.84)	1,739.2 (68.47)
Average rainfall mm (inches)	84.1 (3.31)	71.7 (2.82)	75.5 (2.97)	110.5 (4.35)	121.0 (4.76)	149.3 (5.88)	140.0 (5.51)	138.5 (5.45)	133.2 (5.24)	154.6 (6.09)	158.4 (6.24)	117.5 (4.63)	1,454.3 (57.25)
Average snowfall cm (inches)	75.3 (29.6)	62.6 (24.6)	53.6 (21.1)	19.6 (7.7)	3.7 (1.5)	0.2 (0.1)	0 (0)	0 (0)	0 (0)	2.2 (0.9)	16.3 (6.4)	54.8 (21.6)	288.3 (113.5)
Average precipitation days (≥ 0.2 mm)	19	17	17	15	15	16	17	17	15	16	17	18	199
Average rainy days (≥ 0.2 mm)	7	6	8	11	15	16	17	17	15	16	14	10	152
Average snowy days (≥ 0.2 cm)	16	14	12	6	trace	trace	trace	0	0	trace	5	12	65
Source: 1961-1990 Environment and Climate Change Canada

== First Nations ==
Burgeo (Najioqonuk in the Miꞌkmaq language) falls under the Flat Bay ward of the Qalipu First Nation. It is also home to the independent Burgeo First Nation Band, a local self-identified band of Miꞌkmaq that currently have status and non-status members. Non-status members are planning to seek status under the Indian Act.

== Notable people ==
The famed Canadian nature writer and naturalist Farley Mowat lived in Burgeo for five years during his time in Newfoundland. He wrote several books during his time there, including the controversial A Whale for the Killing, which was later adapted into a movie loosely based on the book but with the same name. Mowat's wife, Claire Mowat, wrote her book The Outport People about life in Burgeo; however, the town in the book is given the fictional name "Baleena".

Route 480, also referred to as the Burgeo road, was a frequent subject for famed Canadian painter Christopher Pratt, who depicted it on several occasions and began his book Thoughts on Driving to Venus there in 1999. On 11 April 2009, Pratt wrote:

'Burgeo Road, 10:30 am. 3 °C, breezy, mixture of sun and cloud. Enroute Sandbanks on a chilly but very inviting day. I always remember these "Car Books" began on this road—intended to be a short-hand, stream of consciousness, trigger-happy sort of thing, a sequence of responses, not considered efforts at insights or forced philosophies.'

Henry Ward Cunningham (1862–1943), an Anglican clergyman born in Burgeo, presided over burial services at sea for victims of the Titanic disaster while aboard the recovery ship CS Minia.

== See also ==
- List of cities and towns in Newfoundland and Labrador
- Burgeo-La Poile
- Newfoundland outport
