= Grey River, Newfoundland and Labrador =

Grey River Little River
- Local service district / designated place
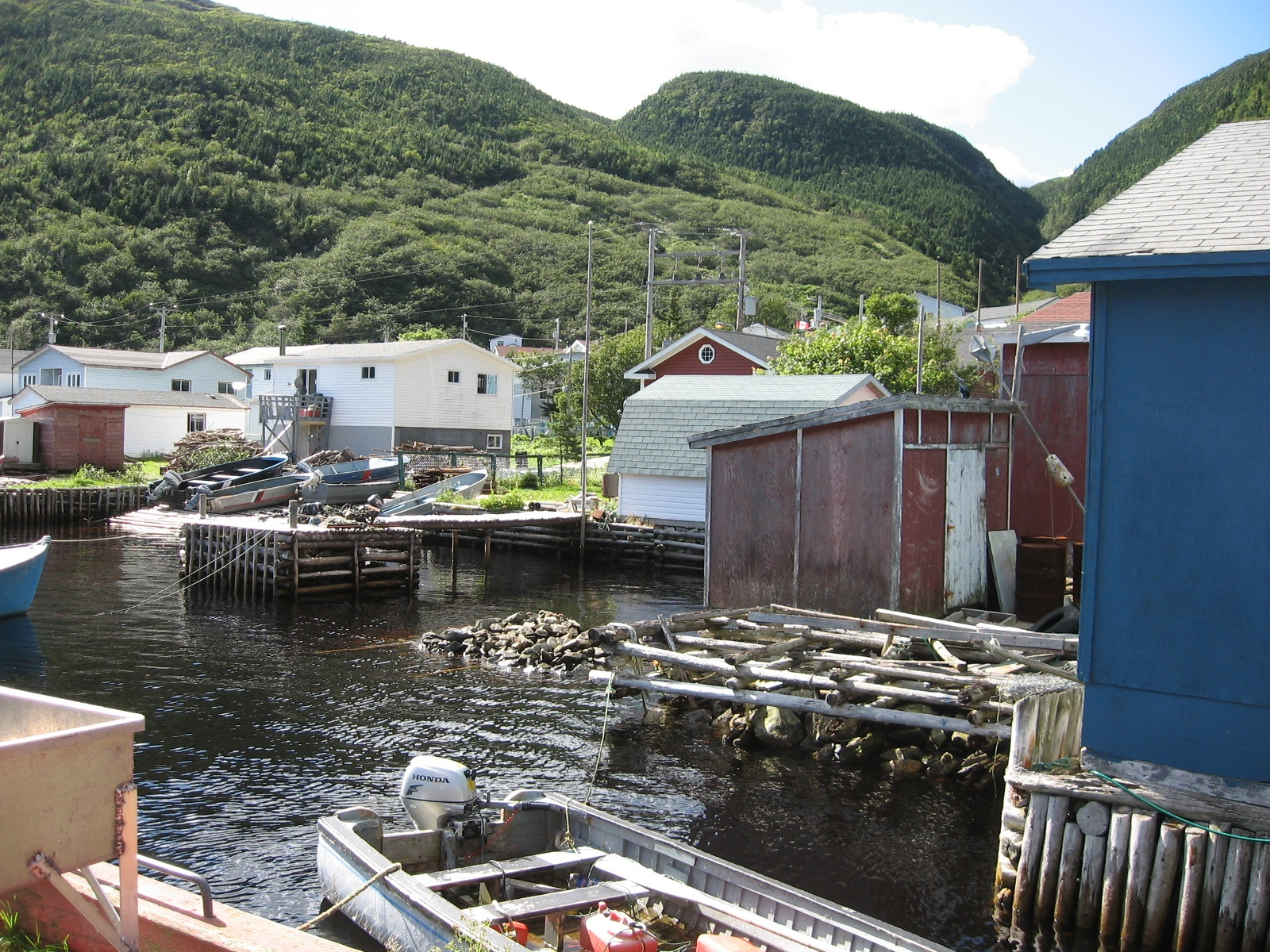
- Nickname: Rivers
- Location of Grey River in Newfoundland
- Coordinates: 47°35′20.57″N 57°06′14.23″W
- Country: Canada
- Province: Newfoundland and Labrador
- Census division: 3

Government
  - MHA: Michael King (Burgeo-LaPoile)
  - MP: Carol Anstey (Long Range Mountains)

Population (2021)
  - Total: 95
- Time zone: UTC-3:30 (Newfoundland Time)
  - Summer (DST): UTC-2:30 (Newfoundland Daylight)
- Postal Code: A0N2L0
- Area code: 709
- Highways: Ferry to Burgeo

Grey River is a local service district and designated place in the Canadian province of Newfoundland and Labrador. Grey River was first settled in the early 1800s by English 'youngsters' brought to Newfoundland via great merchant houses based at Ramea, Burgeo, and Gaultois. James Style(s) was the earliest known resident reported in 1835.

Grey River is inaccessible by road and is serviced by an intra-provincial ferry in Burgeo.

== History ==
The settlement was first named Little River. A severe measles outbreak occurred in the early 1900s. Settlers wired a doctor at St. John's to request advice and medical supplies. The dispatch was sent to Little River on the north-east coast instead of this settlement on the south-west coast. As a result, there were quite a few deaths and the name was changed to Grey River to prevent similar happenings.

== Geography ==
Grey River is in Newfoundland within Subdivision F of Division No. 3.

== Demographics ==
As a designated place in the 2021 Census of Population conducted by Statistics Canada, Grey River recorded a population of 95 living in 41 of its 50 total private dwellings, a change of −8.7% from its 2016 population of 104. With a land area of 2.44 km^{2} (0.94 sq mi), it had a population density of 42.6/km^{2} (110.4/sq mi) in 2016.

== Economy ==
Fishing has long remained the main industry in Grey River with the salmon fishery becoming an economic backbone for the community. Since the 1960s and 1970s, residents have increasingly returned to the salmon fishery for income. The scallop fishery also proposes a viable fishing alternative.

=== Sawmill, mine, and bunkhouse ===
The sawmill in Little River was built in 1955 by then owner, Tom Young, and is currently owned by Garfield Young. Lumber made at this sawmill was sold to several places outside Little River. It was turned into a gas pump in 1988 once the sawmill had fallen out of use and a place to store gasoline and fuel was needed. Prior to this, fuel was stored outside in large drums.

Grey River Tungsten of Buchans, NL (now Playfair Mining, Vancouver, BC, Canada) started the mine upon discovering plentiful tungsten. They dumped the leftover dirt about a hundred meters from the mine entrance by using a little cart run by a diesel motor. The mine went in the cliff about a mile and a half. The mine shut down because the price of Tungsten dropped on the world market. Today, the stock price lists at a penny or two per share. The property is located adjacent to the fishing village of Grey River.

The miners built the bunkhouse in 1962. Some miners stayed there while others stayed in their homes. An American company named Asarco (American Smelting And Refining Company) owned the mine and the bunkhouse, but now Liberty Resources does. Inside the bunkhouse, there was just a straight hallway with sleeping quarters on each side. Today, teachers stay in the bunkhouse.

A 6,300 foot long (1,920 metre) adit has been driven into the Main Vein from near the village of Grey River at approximately 40 metres above sea level. Docking and wharf facilities existed at the Asarco adit but the present conditions are not known.

A large government-owned wharf in Grey River is serviced by coastal boat from Burgeo, a coastal port about 40 km to the west. Burgeo is linked by Route 480 to the Trans-Canada Highway and Stephenville airport approximately 125 km to the North. The claims are accessed by foot and helicopter while the Main Zone adit is within 150 metres by gravel trail from Grey River village. A local diesel generator supplies electricity to Grey River.

The first reported census of 1857 reveals a population of only thirteen citizens. The population today reaches only 104 residents. Located between two mountains, a sheltered basin offers protection from the raging winds which often stop the ferry service from running on schedule. These hills reach an elevation of 199–305 meters or 1000 feet.

== Government ==
Grey River is a local service district (LSD) that is governed by a committee responsible for the provision of certain services to the community. The chair of the LSD committee is Lawrence (Larry) Short.

== See also ==
- List of communities in Newfoundland and Labrador
- List of designated places in Newfoundland and Labrador
- List of local service districts in Newfoundland and Labrador
- Resettlement (Newfoundland)
