= Margaree =

Coordinates: 47.572°N 59.054°W

Location of Margaree in Newfoundland and Labrador

Margaree is a settlement in Newfoundland and Labrador.
