= Ramea Islands =

Coordinates: 47°31′N 57°23′W

The Ramea Islands, Newfoundland and Labrador, are an archipelago off the south coast of Newfoundland. In 1864, a small community of 30 families resided there. The Ramea Islands consist of five large islands: Northwest Island, Great Island (or Big Island), Middle Island, Harbour Island and Southwest Island. In the early 1940s, all inhabitants relocated to Northwest Island, forming the present-day town of Ramea.

== See also ==
- List of communities in Newfoundland and Labrador
