= Fox Roost =

Coordinates: 47.571°N 59.040°W

Location of Fox Roost in Newfoundland and Labrador

Fox Roost is a settlement in Newfoundland and Labrador.
