= Michael King (politician) =

Canadian politician

Michael King MHA

Member of the Newfoundland and Labrador House of Assembly for Burgeo-La Poile
- Incumbent
- Assumed office October 14, 2025
- Preceded by: Andrew Parsons

Personal details
- Born: Burnt Islands, Newfoundland and Labrador
- Party: Liberal
- Occupation: executive assistant

Michael Augustus King is a Canadian politician from the Liberal Party of Newfoundland and Labrador. In the 2025 Newfoundland and Labrador general election he was elected to the Newfoundland and Labrador House of Assembly in Burgeo-La Poile.

Born and raised in Burnt Islands, King was an advisor to Premier Andrew Furey as well as an executive assistant to Minister of Industry, Energy and Technology Andrew Parsons.

Since the Liberals lost the election, King entered the House of Assembly in opposition. He is the opposition critic for the ministries of Environment, Conservation and Climate Change, Rural Development, and the Multi-Materials Stewardship Board, in addition to the Liberal caucus whip.

== Election results ==
2025 Newfoundland and Labrador general election: Burgeo-La Poile
Party	Candidate	Votes	%	±%
Liberal	Michael King	2,001	59.84	-27.26
Progressive Conservative	Victoria Young	1,259	37.65	+27.37
New Democratic	Judy Vanta	84	2.51	-0.11
Total valid votes		3,344		
Total rejected ballots				
Turnout				
Eligible voters				
Liberal hold		Swing		-27.32
