= Diamond Cove, Newfoundland and Labrador =

Diamond Cove
- Local service district / designated place
- Location of Diamond Cove Diamond Cove (Canada)
- Coordinates: 47.61°N 58.725°W
- Country: Canada
- Province: Newfoundland and Labrador
- Region: Newfoundland
- Census division: 3
- Census subdivision: J

Government
  - Type: Unincorporated

Area
  - Land: 2.42 km^{2} (0.93 sq mi)

Population (2016)
  - Total: 46
- Time zone: UTC−03:30 (NST)
  - Summer (DST): UTC−02:30 (NDT)
- Area code: 709

Diamond Cove is a local service district and designated place in the Canadian province of Newfoundland and Labrador.

== Geography ==
Diamond Cove is in Newfoundland within Subdivision J of Division No. 3.

== Demographics ==
As a designated place in the 2016 Census of Population conducted by Statistics Canada, Diamond Cove recorded a population of 46 living in 25 of its 26 total private dwellings, a change of −9.8% from its 2011 population of 51. With a land area of 2.42 km^{2} (0.93 sq mi), it had a population density of 19.0/km^{2} (49.2/sq mi) in 2016.

== Government ==
Diamond Cove is a local service district (LSD) that is governed by a committee responsible for the provision of certain services to the community. The chair of the LSD committee is Ronald Hardy.

== See also ==
- List of communities in Newfoundland and Labrador
- List of designated places in Newfoundland and Labrador
- List of local service districts in Newfoundland and Labrador
