= La Poile =

- Local service district / designated place
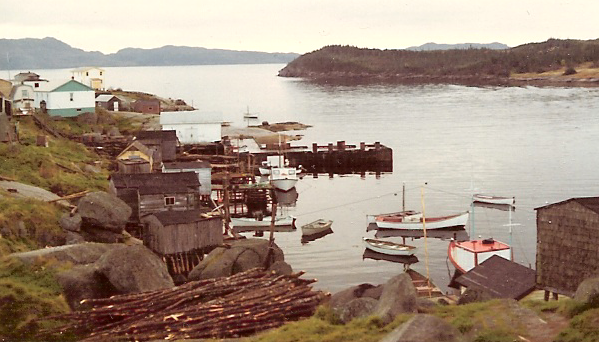
- La Poile as it appeared in 1971

- Location of La Poile in Newfoundland
- Coordinates: 47.685°N 58.395°W
- Country: Canada
- Province: Newfoundland and Labrador

Population (2021)
  - Total: 61
- Time zone: UTC-3:30 (Newfoundland Time)
  - Summer (DST): UTC-2:30 (Newfoundland Daylight)
- Area code: 709
- Highways: Ferry to Rose Blanche

La Poile is a local service district and designated place in the Canadian province of Newfoundland and Labrador. It is on La Poile Bay. The community is inaccessible by road and is served by a ferry via a port in Rose Blanche.

The town mainly works in lobster fishing. As of the 2021 census, the population is 61 people. The community has a school offering grades K-9 and a small store. There is an Anglican church which offers services once a month. Health care is limited to a first responder and a visiting doctor who comes once a month, weather permitting.

The town was the subject of an episode of Viceland's Abandoned. There is only one student in the local school. The last town-wide vote in 2017 did not have enough support for the residents to accept provincial money to leave the settlement under the resettlement program.

== Geography ==
La Poile is in Newfoundland within Subdivision I of Division No. 3.

== Demographics ==
As a designated place in the 2021 Census of Population conducted by Statistics Canada, La Poile recorded a population of 61 living in 33 of its 47 total private dwellings, a change of −29.9% from its 2016 population of 87. With a land area of 1.46 km^{2} (0.56 sq mi), it had a population density of 59.6/km^{2} (154.3/sq mi) in 2016.

== Government ==
La Poile is a local service district (LSD) that is governed by a committee responsible for the provision of certain services to the community. The chair of the LSD committee is Monford Organ.

== See also ==
- List of designated places in Newfoundland and Labrador
- List of local service districts in Newfoundland and Labrador
- Newfoundland outport
