= Rose Blanche-Harbour le Cou =

Rose Blanche–Harbour le Cou
- Town
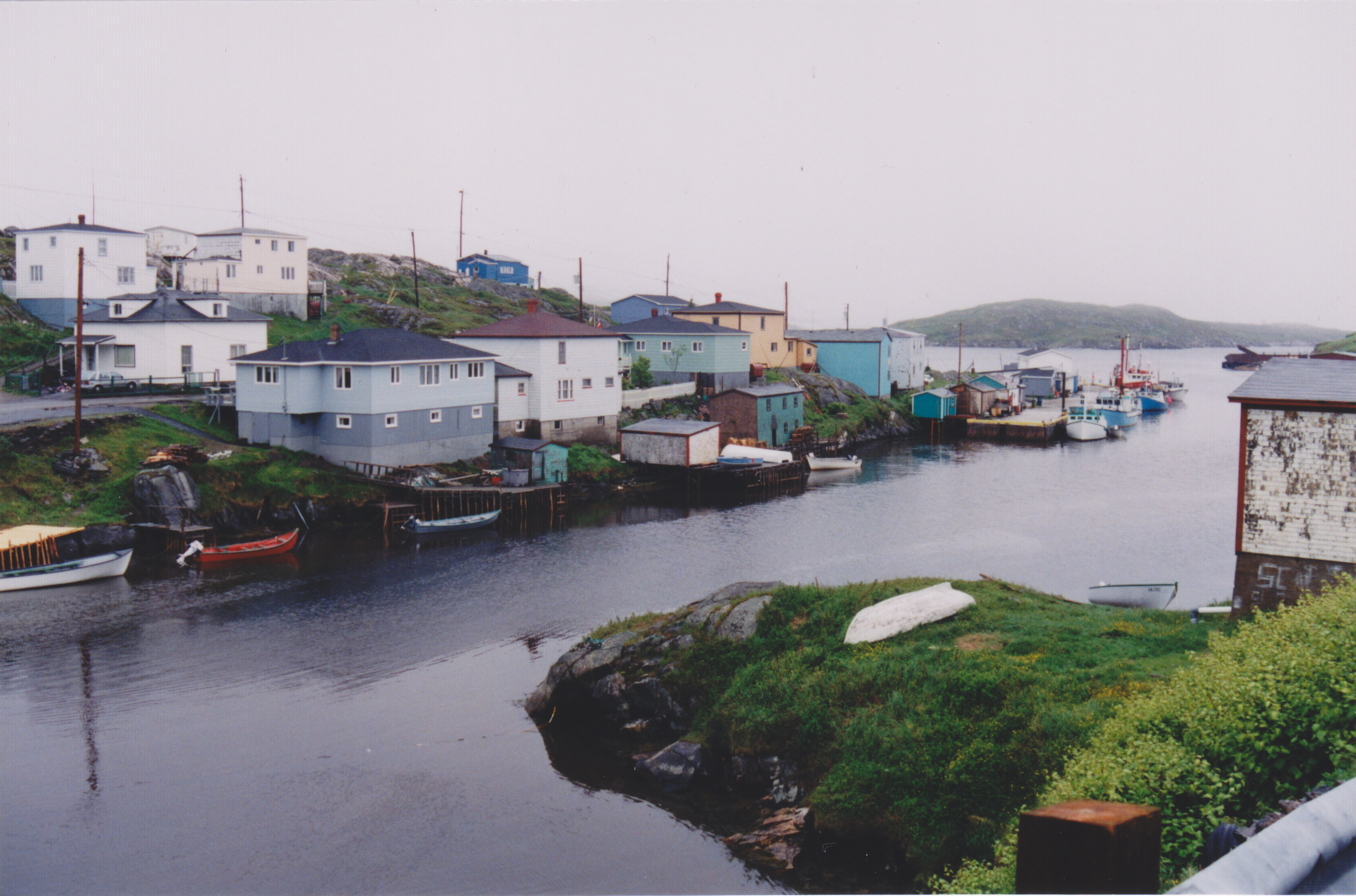
- Rose Blanche Bay, Gulf of St. Lawrence

- Location of Rose Blanche – Harbour le Cou in Newfoundland
- Coordinates: 47°37′N 58°43′W
- Country: Canada
- Province: Newfoundland and Labrador
- Settled: 1810

Population (2021)
  - Total: 344
- Time zone: UTC-3:30 (Newfoundland Time)
  - Summer (DST): UTC-2:30 (Newfoundland Daylight)
- Area code: 709
- Highways: Route 470; Ferry to La Poile

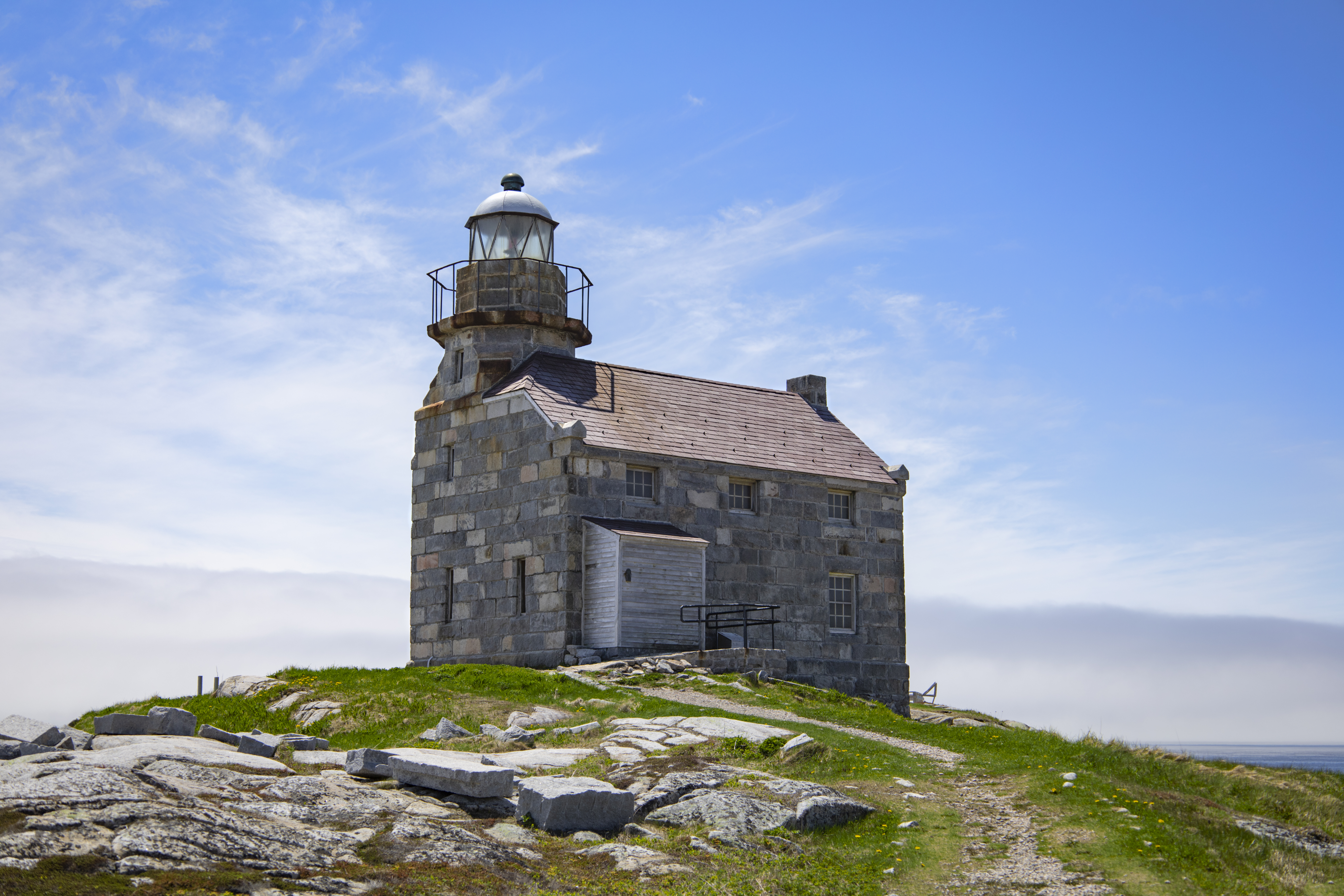
Rose Blanche lighthouse

Rose Blanche–Harbour le Cou is a small town on Newfoundland's southwest shore, about 45 km from Port aux Basques, at the end of Route 470.

== Location ==
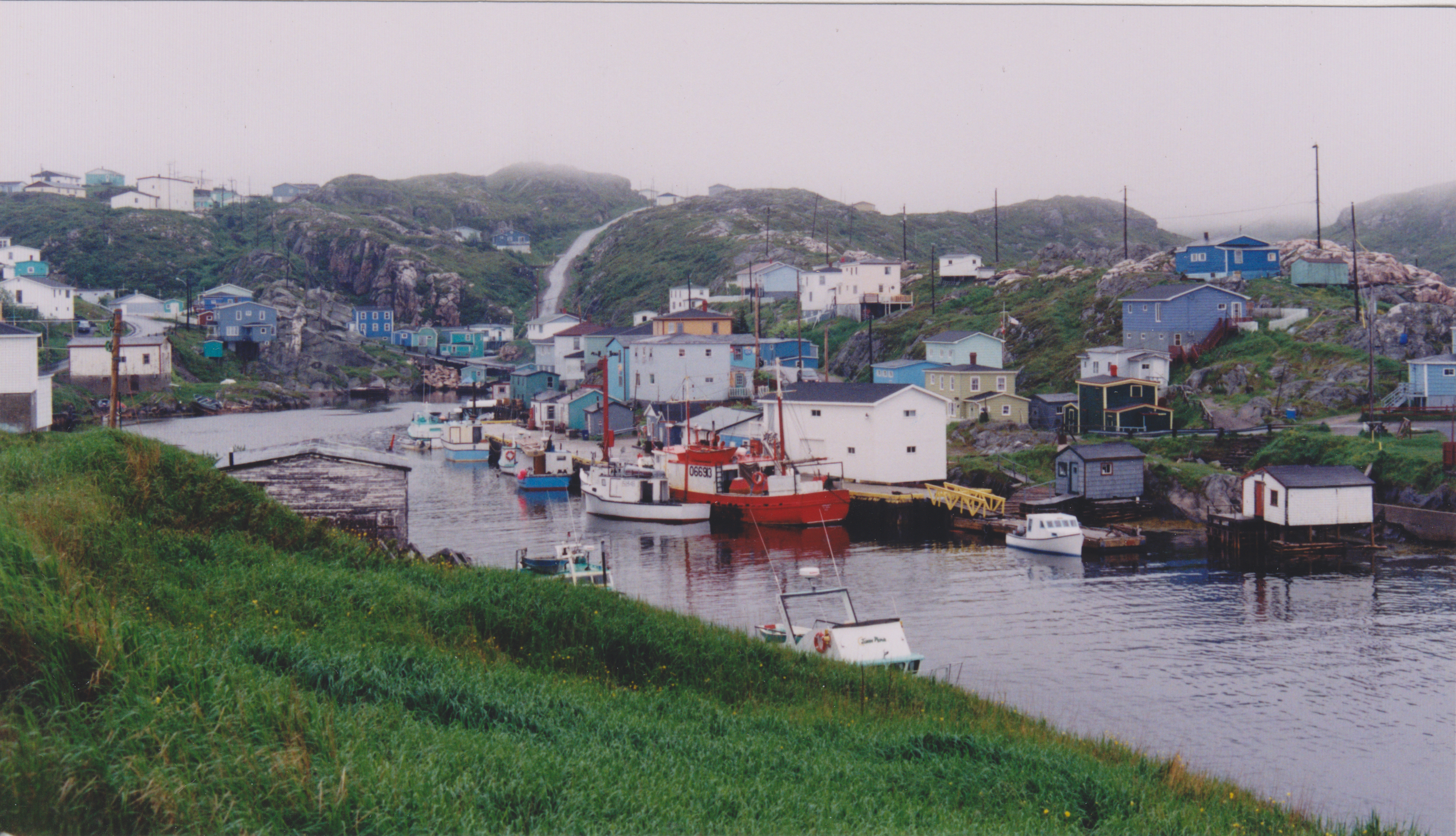
Rose Blanche-Harbour Le Cou (Town), Rose Blanche Bay, Gulf of St. Lawrence

This community is located in a barren area on the east side of the small Rose Blanche Bay. In this bay there are 2 harbours that were mainly used to provide shelter for fishing vessels. Scenery includes the rugged granite coastline, and the white and rocky cliffs of "Diamond Cove". Its granite lighthouse was in operation from 1873 to the 1940s. After it was abandoned in the 1940s the building fell into ruins. The spiral stone staircase extends into the tower wall and kept the tower from collapsing while the remainder of the lighthouse fell to ruin. In 1999 the lighthouse was fully reconstructed and serves as a tourist attraction.

From Rose Blanche there is a passenger ferry that services the isolated community of La Poile 35 kilometres (22 mi) to the east.

== History ==
The Rose Blanche harbour was first used by French migratory fishermen who came in the early 1700s to fish the nearby Rose Blanche Bank which had an abundance of cod. The harbor provided good anchorage, being well sheltered by Caines Island and Rose Blanche Point. The name Rose Blanche is a corruption of the French words "roche blanche" (white rock) which can be seen at Diamond Cove. This white quartz was highly visible to the French migratory fishermen when they first approached the shore in the early 1700s.

The first settlers in Rose Blanche arrived and probably settled in 1810, though the French had held seasonal premises in the area in the 18th century. Rose Blanche was first settled for its sheltered harbours and close location to fishing grounds.

By the 1869 census, the population had grown to 663, and the area continued to attract new settlers from England and the Channel Islands to participate in the fishery. By the 1870s the community had a number of businesses which participated in the local fishery and the Labrador fishery.

== Demographics ==
In the 2021 Census of Population conducted by Statistics Canada, Rose Blanche-Harbour le Cou had a population of 344 living in 172 of its 255 total private dwellings, a change of −12.7% from its 2016 population of 394. With a land area of 4.49 km^{2} (1.73 sq mi), it had a population density of 76.6/km^{2} (198.4/sq mi) in 2021.

== Amenities ==
The 1950s and 1960s brought significant changes to the community with the opening of a fresh-frozen fish plant, plus resettlement of outlying communities in Rose Blanche, as a result of the road connection completed between Rose Blanche and Port aux Basques in 1961. St. Michael's Elementary school was shut down by the government due to lack of funding.

The Anglican church is dedicated to "Saint Michael and All Angels," which has a "high church" tradition. A few decades ago the former church building was replaced by a new one.

== See also ==
- List of cities and towns in Newfoundland and Labrador
- Newfoundland outport
