= 2024 Canadian electoral calendar =

2024 elections in Canada

This is a list of elections in Canada that were held in 2024. Included are municipal, provincial and federal elections, by-elections on any level, referendums and party leadership races at any level.

== Key Electoral Events ==
=== General elections ===
Date	Jurisdiction	Party before	Incumbent Premier	Party after	Premier after	Swing
October 19	British Columbia	New Democratic; 55 / 87	David Eby	New Democratic; 47 / 93	David Eby	-4.3% -13 seats (Note: Swing calculated by treating sum of Conservative's BC United's 2020 result's as Conservatives previous results)
October 21	New Brunswick	Progressive Conservative; 28 / 49	Blaine Higgs	Liberal; 31 / 49	Susan Holt	9.10% 12½ seats
October 28	Saskatchewan	Saskatchewan; 42 / 61	Scott Moe	Saskatchewan; 34 / 61	Scott Moe	8.69% -10½ seats
November 26	Nova Scotia	Progressive Conservative; 34 / 55	Tim Houston	Progressive Conservative; 43 / 55	Tim Houston	14.02% 10½ seats (Note: Swing from Liberals, which came in second in vote share but third in seat count)

=== By-elections ===
Date	Juris	Electoral District	Party before	Member before	Party after	Member after	Swing
January 30	NL	Conception Bay East-Bell Island	PC	David Brazil	Liberal	Fred Hutton	15.5%
February 7	PE	Borden-Kinkora	PC	Jamie Fox	Green	Matt MacFarlane	17.9%
March 4	Fed	Durham, ON	Conservative	Erin O'Toole	Conservative	Jamil Jivani	9.2%
April 15	NL	Fogo Island-Cape Freels	Liberal	Derrick Bragg	PC	Jim McKenna	21.3%
May 2	ON	Lambton—Kent—Middlesex	PC	Monte McNaughton	PC	Steve Pinsonneault	-7.5%
May 2	ON	Milton	PC	Parm Gill	PC	Zee Hamid	2.2%
May 21	NS	Pictou West	PC	Karla MacFarlane	PC	Marco MacLeod	2.3%
May 27	NL	Baie Verte-Green Bay	Liberal	Brian Warr	PC	Lin Paddock	32.0%
June 18	MB	Tuxedo	PC	Heather Stefanson	NDP	Carla Compton	5.29%
June 24	Fed	Toronto—St. Paul's, ON	Liberal	Carolyn Bennett	Conservative	Don Stewart	12.8%
August 22	NL	Waterford Valley	Liberal	Tom Osborne	Liberal	Jamie Korab	-13.7%
September 16	Fed	Elmwood—Transcona, MB	NDP	Daniel Blaikie	NDP	Leila Dance	8.69%
September 16	Fed	LaSalle—Émard—Verdun, QC	Liberal	David Lametti	BQ	Louis-Philippe Sauvé	10.8%
September 19	ON	Bay of Quinte	PC	Todd Smith	PC	Tyler Allsopp	-12.7
December 16	Fed	Cloverdale—Langley City, BC	Liberal	John Aldag	Conservative	Tamara Jansen	26.7%
December 18	AB	Lethbridge West	NDP	Shannon Phillips	NDP	Rob Miyashiro	-1.5%

=== Leadership Contests ===
Date	Jurisdiction	Party	Status in Legislature	Previous permanent leader (leadership)	New leader(s)
June 22	Alberta	NDP	Official Opposition; 38 / 87	Rachel Notley (2014-24)	Naheed Nenshi
November 16 (Note: female co-spokesperson election)	Quebec	Québec solidaire	3rd party, with status 12 / 125	Émilise Lessard-Therrien (2023-24) (Note: serve with male co-spokesperson Gabriel Nadeau-Dubois, elected in 2017)	Ruba Ghazal

== January–February ==
- January 8: Mayoral by-election in Morell, Prince Edward Island
- January 10: Municipal and mayoral by-election in Westlock, Alberta
- January 13: Municipal by-election in Stewart, British Columbia
- January 17: Municipal by-election in Northport, Prince Edward Island
- January 20: Municipal by-election in Chase, British Columbia
- January 21: Municipal by-election in district 5, Cap-Saint-Ignace and districts 2, 3 and 6, Saint-Pierre-de-Lamy, Quebec
- January 28: Mayoral and district 2 municipal by-election in Baie-Johan-Beetz and mayoral and district 1, Saint-Sévère, Quebec
- January 30: Provincial by-election in Conception Bay East-Bell Island, Newfoundland and Labrador
- February 3: By-election in School District 40 New Westminster
- February 7: Provincial by-election in Borden-Kinkora, Prince Edward Island
- February 11: Municipal by-election in District 2, Montebello, Quebec
- February 12: Municipal by-election in North Rustico, Prince Edward Island
- February 13:
  - Municipal by-election in Lloydminster
  - Municipal election in Enterprise, Northwest Territories
- February 18: Municipal by-elections in District 2, Lac-Frontière; Mayor and Districts 4 & 5, Chapais; District 4, Saint-Cyrille-de-Wendover; Sainte-Marguerite District, Sept-Îles, Quebec
- February 21: Municipal by-election in Grande Cache, Municipal District of Greenview, Alberta
- February 24: Municipal by-election in Hudson's Hope, BC
- February 25: Municipal by-elections in District 4, Mont-Blanc; District 1, Sainte-Anne-des-Lacs; Mayor and District 3, Warwick; District 3, Saint-Adrien; District 3, Saint-Cyprien, Chaudière-Appalaches; Districts 3 & 5, Saint-Fabien; Mayor, Saint-François-d'Assise; District 5, Sainte-Justine; District 2, Saint-Léon-le-Grand, Mauricie; Mayor, Saint-Michel-de-Bellechasse; District 3, Saint-Paul-de-la-Croix; Districts 4 & 5, Saint-Paulin, Quebec
- February 26: Municipal by-elections in Rocky Mountain House and Standard, Alberta

== March ==
- March 1: Municipal by-election in Kinkora, Prince Edward Island
- March 2: Municipal by-election in Chetwynd, British Columbia
- March 3: Municipal by-elections in District 3, Mont-Saint-Pierre; District 1, Cowansville; De La Gare District, Deux-Montagnes; District 6, Notre-Dame-des-Bois; District 5, Ormstown; District 1, Saint-Célestin (municipality); Districts 3 & 4, Saint-Charles-sur-Richelieu; District 2, Saint-Côme; District 1, Saint-Édouard-de-Fabre; District 2, Sainte-Irène; District 4, Saint-Jean-de-Cherbourg; District 2, Sainte-Thècle; Districts 3 & 6, Scotstown, Quebec
- March 4: Federal by-election in Durham, Ontario
- March 10: Municipal by-elections in District 6, Papineauville; Mayoral by-election in Hatley (municipality); District 2, Lamarche; Laniel; Districts 3 & 4, Rapide-Danseur; District 5, Sainte-Angèle-de-Mérici; District 1, Saint-Étienne-de-Beauharnois; Mayor and District 2 & 3, Saint-Étienne-de-Bolton; Districts 5 & 6, Saint-Félix-de-Dalquier; Districts 2 & 4, Sainte-Florence; Districts 2 & 6, Saint-Léon-le-Grand, Bas-Saint-Laurent; District 2, Sainte-Marguerite-Marie; Mayor, Sainte-Sabine, Quebec
- March 12: Municipal by-election in Ward 4, St. John's, Newfoundland and Labrador
- March 16: Municipal by-election in Creston and Silverton, British Columbia
- March 17: Municipal by-elections in Districts 3, 4, 5, & 6, Gallichan; Mayoral by-election in Grosses-Roches; District 4, Guérin; Mayor and Districts 2 & 6, Macamic; Districts 2, 3 & 6, Saint-Pierre-de-Lamy
- March 18: Municipal by-election in Linkletter, Prince Edward Island
- March 24: Municipal by-elections in District 1, Sutton, District 2, Baie-Sainte-Catherine; District 4, Dupuy; District 4, La Patrie; Districts 3 & 4, La Reine; District 6, Notre-Dame-de-Pontmain; District 3, Portage-du-Fort; Districts 3 & 6, Rémigny; District 2, Saint-Antoine-de-Tilly; District 3, Sainte-Rose-de-Watford; District 4, Saint-Isidore-de-Clifton; District 2, Saint-Joseph-de-Beauce; Districts 3&4, Saint-Joseph-de-Lepage; District 6, Saint-Louis-de-Gonzague; District 6, Saint-Luc-de-Vincennes; District 1, Saint-Pierre-de-la-Rivière-du-Sud, Quebec
- March 28: Municipal by-election in Kananaskis Improvement District

== April ==
- April 1: Municipal by-election in Crapaud, Prince Edward Island
- April 7: Municipal by-election in District 3, Lantier, Quebec
- April 8: Fort McMurray Catholic Schools by-election
- April 14: Municipal by-elections in District 3, Bonsecours; Districts 5&6, Denholm; Mayor and districts, 1,3,4,5,&6, Les Méchins; District 2, Saint-Édouard-de-Fabre; Mayor, Sainte-Hélène-de-Kamouraska; District 6, Sainte-Lucie-des-Laurentides; District 1, Saint-Roch-Ouest; District 6, Taschereau, Quebec
- April 15:
  - 2024 Fogo Island-Cape Freels provincial by-election
  - 2024 Action Gatineau leadership election
- April 20:
  - Kootenay-Columbia School District No. 20 trustee by-election
  - Municipal by-election in Merritt, British Columbia
- April 21: Municipal by-election in District 6, Pike River; District 5, Val-des-Lacs; Seat 2, Rosemère, Quebec
- April 22: Municipal by-election in Red Deer, Alberta
- April 28: Municipal by-election in District 6, Saint-François-de-la-Rivière-du-Sud, Quebec
- April 30: Municipal by-election in Paradise, Newfoundland and Labrador

== May ==
- May 2: 2024 Lambton—Kent—Middlesex provincial by-election and 2024 Milton provincial by-election in Ontario.
- May 5: Mayoral by-election in Saint-Césaire; municipal by-elections in District 2, Saint-Sixte and councillor #3, Saint-Sauveur, Quebec
- May 6:
  - Municipal by-election in Norwich, Ontario
  - Municipal by-elections in Ward 3, Arcadia; Ward 2, Campobello Island; Ward 4, Carleton North; Ward 2, Grand Lake; Wards 3 & 5, Île-de-Lamèque; mayor and Ward 4, Lakeland Ridges; Ward 5, Nackawic-Millville; and councillor, Tracy, New Brunswick
  - Municipal by-election in Fort Macleod, Alberta
- May 7: Municipal by-election in Stirling, Alberta
- May 8: Municipal by-election in Rural Municipality of Buckland No. 491, Saskatchewan
- May 13: Municipal by-election in Ward 4, Ramara, Ontario
- May 15: Champagne and Aishihik First Nations council by-election
- May 18: Municipal by-election in Tahsis, British Columbia
- May 19: Municipal by-election in District 3, Chazel, Quebec
- May 21: 2024 Pictou West provincial by-election in Nova Scotia.
- May 26: Municipal by-elections in Districts 1, 2 & 6, Sainte-Sabine, Chaudière-Appalaches, Quebec
- May 27: 2024 Baie Verte-Green Bay provincial by-election in Newfoundland and Labrador

== June ==
- June 2: Municipal by-election in District 3, Barraute; District 6, Sainte-Hélène-de-Kamouraska, Quebec
- June 3: Municipal by-election in North Shore, Prince Edward Island
- June 6:
  - Ward 1, Louis Riel School Division trustee by-election
  - Municipal by-election in Ward 2 – Rural, Port Hope
- June 9: 2024 Gatineau mayoral by-election and Carrefour-de-l'Hôpital District by-election; District 6, Val-Morin, Quebec
- June 10:
  - 2024 Mississauga mayoral by-election and Ward 5 by-election
  - Municipal by-elections in Northport and Wellington, Prince Edward Island
- June 16: Municipal by-election in District 2, Aguanish; District 4, Franquelin; District 2, La Malbaie; Mayor, Les Éboulements; Districts 1 & 4, Notre-Dame-du-Rosaire; Districts 2, 4 & 6, Sainte-Pétronille, Quebec
- June 18: 2024 Tuxedo provincial by-election, Manitoba
- June 22:
  - 2024 Alberta New Democratic Party leadership election
  - Municipal by-election in 100 Mile House, British Columbia
- June 23: Municipal by-election in District 6, Sainte-Sabine, Chaudière-Appalaches, Quebec
- June 24:
  - 2024 Toronto—St. Paul's federal by-election
  - Municipal by-election in Chestermere, Alberta (mayor and five councillors)
  - Municipal by-election in Tignish, Prince Edward Island
- June 25: Grande Prairie and District Catholic Schools Wards 1 & 3 by-election

== July–September ==
- July 7: Municipal by-election in District 5, Inverness; District 4, Notre-Dame-de-Bonsecours; District 6, Sainte-Élisabeth, Quebec
- July 8: Municipal by-election in Warren Grove, Prince Edward Island
- July 14: Municipal by-election in District 4, Maddington Falls; District 2, Sainte-Brigitte-de-Laval; District 2, Saint-Bruno-de-Kamouraska, District 2, Saint-Pie; District 5, Saint-Victor, Quebec
- July 15: York Region District School Board by-election, Wards 1, 2 & 4, Richmond Hill
- July 20: Municipal by-election in Sayward, British Columbia
- July 21: Municipal by-election in Districts 3 & 5, Notre-Dame-des-Neiges, Quebec
- July 27: Municipal elections in resort villages in Saskatchewan
- August 4: Municipal by-election in District 1, Newport; Districts 1 & 6, Saint-Nazaire-de-Dorchester, Quebec
- August 12:
  - Municipal by-election in Black River-Matheson, Ontario (entire council)
  - Mayoral by-election in Resort Municipality, Prince Edward Island
- August 17: Mississaugas of the Credit First Nation by-election
- August 18: Municipal by-election in District 4, Saint-Romain, Quebec
- August 22: Provincial by-election in Waterford Valley, Newfoundland and Labrador
- August 24: By-election in Electoral Area E, Central Coast Regional District
- September 8: Municipal by-elections in Cap-aux-Meules District, L'Île-du-Havre-Aubert District and Grande-Entrée District, Les Îles-de-la-Madeleine, Quebec
- September 10: Municipal by-election in Thompson, Manitoba and the School District of Mystery Lake
- September 14: Nanaimo Ladysmith Public Schools trustee by-election and municipal by-election in Canal Flats, British Columbia
- September 16:
  - 2024 Elmwood—Transcona federal by-election
  - 2024 LaSalle—Émard—Verdun federal by-election
- September 19: Provincial by-election in Bay of Quinte, Ontario
- September 21: Municipal by-election in Cumberland, Kimberley and Harrison Hot Springs, British Columbia
- September 22: Municipal by-election in District 2, Otterburn Park, Quebec
- September 29: Mayoral by-election in La Motte, Quebec
- September 30: Council by-election in Russell, Ontario

== October ==
- October 6: Municipal election in Courcelles-Saint-Évariste, Quebec
- October 7: Municipal by-election in Ward 5, Summerside, Prince Edward Island
- October 17: Yukon municipal elections
- October 19:
  - 2024 Nova Scotia municipal elections
  - 2024 British Columbia general election
- October 21:
  - 2024 New Brunswick general election
  - 2024 Northwest Territories municipal elections
- October 26: Municipal by-election in Stewart, British Columbia
- October 27: Municipal by-election in Georges-Jules-Beaudet District, Coteau-du-Lac, Quebec
- October 28:
  - 2024 Saskatchewan general election
  - Referendum by-election in South Bruce, Ontario
- October 29: Municipal by-election in Flatrock, Newfoundland and Labrador
- October 30: Mountain View School Division trustee by-election

== November–December ==
- November 2: Fraser-Fort George Regional District by-election
- November 3: Quebec English school board elections
- November 4:
  - Municipal by-election in Ward 15 Don Valley West, Toronto
  - Municipal by-election in Ward 3, West Lincoln, Ontario
- November 5: Municipal by-election in Ward 3, St. John's, Newfoundland and Labrador
- November 8: Conseil Scolaire Francophone School District by-election
- November 13: 2024 Saskatchewan municipal elections
- November 16:
  - Municipal by-election in Mackenzie, British Columbia
  - 2024 Québec solidaire female co-spokesperson election
- November 23: Municipal by-election in Hazelton and Logan Lake, British Columbia
- November 26: 2024 Nova Scotia general election
- December 7: Coast Mountains School District by-election
- December 8: Municipal by-election in District 6, Gallichan; Mayor and districts 1, 3, and 4, Grosse-Île; District 2, Palmarolle; District 5, Piedmont; and District 6, Sainte-Sabine, Chaudière-Appalaches, Quebec
- December 9: Municipal by-elections in Beausoleil (mayor), Belledune, Champdoré (Ward 3), Doaktown, Fundy-St. Martins (Ward 1), Hanwell (Ward 5), Hautes-Terres, Lakeland Ridges (Ward 4), Riverview (Ward 1), Saint John (Ward 3), Shediac (Ward 3), Strait Shores, Sunbury-York South (Ward 2), and Valley Waters, New Brunswick (Ward 4)
- December 14: Municipal by-election in Port Alberni, British Columbia
- December 15: Municipal by-election in District 2, Belcourt; District 2, Berthier-sur-Mer; Districts 3 and 7, Joliette; District 1, Latulipe-et-Gaboury; District 1, Saint-Léandre; and District 3, Saint-Liguori, Quebec
- December 16: Federal by-election in Cloverdale—Langley City, British Columbia
- December 18: Provincial by-election in Lethbridge West, Alberta

== See also ==
- Canadian provincial elections – each province and their expected next election date
