= 50th General Assembly of Newfoundland and Labrador =

Newfoundland and Labrador legislative session

- Majority parliament
- Apr. 12, 2021 – Sep. 15, 2025

Parliament leaders
- Premier: Hon. Andrew Furey; 19 August 2020 - 9 May 2025
- Hon. John Hogan; 9 May 2025 - 29 October 2025
- Leader of the Opposition: David Brazil; March 31, 2021 – October 14, 2023
- Tony Wakeham; October 14, 2023 – October 29, 2025

Party caucuses
- Government: Liberal
- Opposition: Progressive Conservative
- Recognized: New Democratic

House of Assembly
- Speaker of the House: Derek Bennett; Apr. 12, 2021 – Oct. 14, 2025
- Members: 40 MHA seats

Sovereign
- Monarch: Charles III; Feb. 6, 1952 – Sep. 8, 2022
- Charles III; Sep. 8, 2022 – present
- Lieutenant governor: Judy Foote; May. 3, 2018 – Nov. 14, 2023
- Joan Marie Aylward; Nov. 14, 2023 – present
← 49th	→ 51st

The 50th General Assembly of Newfoundland and Labrador was elected at the 2021 Newfoundland and Labrador general election and sworn-in April 12, 2021. The Assembly was dissolved on September 15, 2025, after premier John Hogan called an election held on October 14.

== Seating Plan ==
	Korab	Loveless	Howell	Pike	Reid	Gambin-Walsh	Stoyles
	P.Parsons	Stoodley	Vacant	Vacant	Davis	Hutton	Vacant
	Coady	Crocker	Hogan	Dempster	Haggie	Byrne	Trimper
Bennett
	Pardy	Petten	Wakeham	Dinn
	Tibbs	O'Driscoll	Conway-Ottenheimer	Parrott	McKenna		Dinn	Vacant
	Wall	Forsey	Dwyer	Evans	Paddock			Joyce	Lane

Current as of June 2025

== List of members ==
Members as of August 2025

Name	Party	Riding	First elected / previously elected
Brian Warr (resigned 2024)	Liberal	Baie Verte-Green Bay	2015
Lin Paddock (won 2024 by-election)	Progressive Conservative	Baie Verte-Green Bay	2024
Craig Pardy	Progressive Conservative	Bonavista	2019
Andrew Parsons (resigned 2025)	Liberal	Burgeo-La Poile	2011
Paul Pike	Liberal	Burin-Grand Bank	2021
Joedy Wall	Progressive Conservative	Cape St. Francis	2021
Steve Crocker	Liberal	Carbonear-Trinity-Bay de Verde	2014
Lisa Dempster	Liberal	Cartwright-L'Anse au Clair	2013
David Brazil (resigned 2023)	Progressive Conservative	Conception Bay East-Bell Island	2010
Fred Hutton (starting 2024)	Liberal	Conception Bay East-Bell Island	2024
Barry Petten	Progressive Conservative	Conception Bay South	2015
Gerry Byrne	Liberal	Corner Brook	2015
Pleaman Forsey	Progressive Conservative	Exploits	2019
Loyola O'Driscoll	Progressive Conservative	Ferryland	2019
Derrick Bragg (died 2024)	Liberal	Fogo Island-Cape Freels	2015
Jim McKenna (starting 2024)	Progressive Conservative	Fogo Island-Cape Freels	2024
Elvis Loveless	Liberal	Fortune Bay-Cape La Hune	2019
John Haggie	Liberal	Gander	2015
Chris Tibbs	Progressive Conservative	Grand Falls-Windsor-Buchans	2019
Pam Parsons	Liberal	Harbour Grace-Port de Grave	2015
Helen Conway-Ottenheimer	Progressive Conservative	Harbour Main	2019
Eddie Joyce	Independent	Humber-Bay of Islands	1989, (Note: First Elected as a Liberal) 1999, (Note: Re-elected as Liberal) 2011
Andrew Furey	Liberal	Humber-Gros Morne	2020
Jordan Brown (resigned 2025)	New Democratic	Labrador West	2019
Perry Trimper	Independent	Lake Melville	2015
Perry Trimper	Liberal	Lake Melville	2015
Derek Bennett	Liberal	Lewisporte-Twillingate	2015
Lucy Stoyles	Liberal	Mount Pearl North	2021
Paul Lane	Independent	Mount Pearl-Southlands	2011 (Note: First Elected as a Progressive Conservative and Re-elected as Liberal)
Sarah Stoodley	Liberal	Mount Scio	2019
Jeff Dwyer	Progressive Conservative	Placentia West-Bellevue	2019
Sherry Gambin-Walsh	Liberal	Placentia-St. Mary's	2015
Krista Howell	Liberal	St. Barbe-L'Anse aux Meadows	2021
Scott Reid	Liberal	St. George's-Humber	2014
Jim Dinn	New Democratic	St. John's Centre	2019
John Abbott (resigned 2025)	Liberal	St. John's East-Quidi Vidi	2021
Siobhan Coady	Liberal	St. John's West	2015
Tony Wakeham	Progressive Conservative	Stephenville-Port au Port	2019
Lloyd Parrott	Progressive Conservative	Terra Nova	2019
Paul Dinn	Progressive Conservative	Topsail-Paradise	2019
Lela Evans	Progressive Conservative	Torngat Mountains	2019
Lela Evans	Independent	Torngat Mountains	2019
Lela Evans	New Democratic	Torngat Mountains	2019
Lela Evans	Progressive Conservative	Torngat Mountains	2019
Bernard Davis	Liberal	Virginia Waters-Pleasantville	2015
Tom Osborne (resigned 2024)	Liberal	Waterford Valley	1996 (Note: First Elected as a Progressive Conservative)
Jamie Korab (starting 2024)	Liberal	Waterford Valley	2024
John Hogan	Liberal	Windsor Lake	2021

== By-elections ==
- Conception Bay East–Bell Island, January 30, 2024, won by Liberal Fred Hutton.
- Fogo Island-Cape Freels, April 15, 2024, won by Progressive Conservative (PC) Jim McKenna
- Baie Verte-Green Bay, May 27, 2024, won by Progressive Conservative (PC) Lin Paddock
- Waterford Valley, August 22, 2024, won by Liberal Jamie Korab
