= 2025 Newfoundland and Labrador general election =

Canadian provincial election

- October 14, 2025

All 40 seats in the Newfoundland and Labrador House of Assembly 21 seats needed for a majority
- Opinion polls
- Turnout: 52.5% (▲1.1 pp)
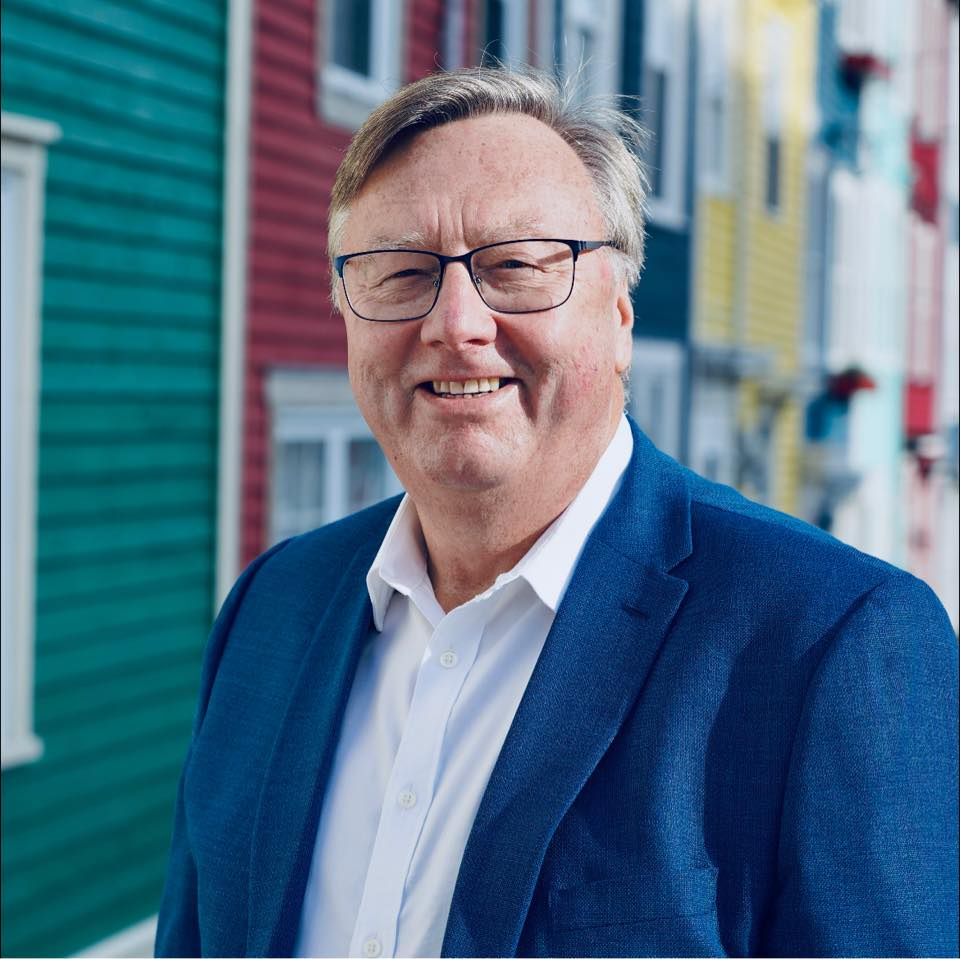

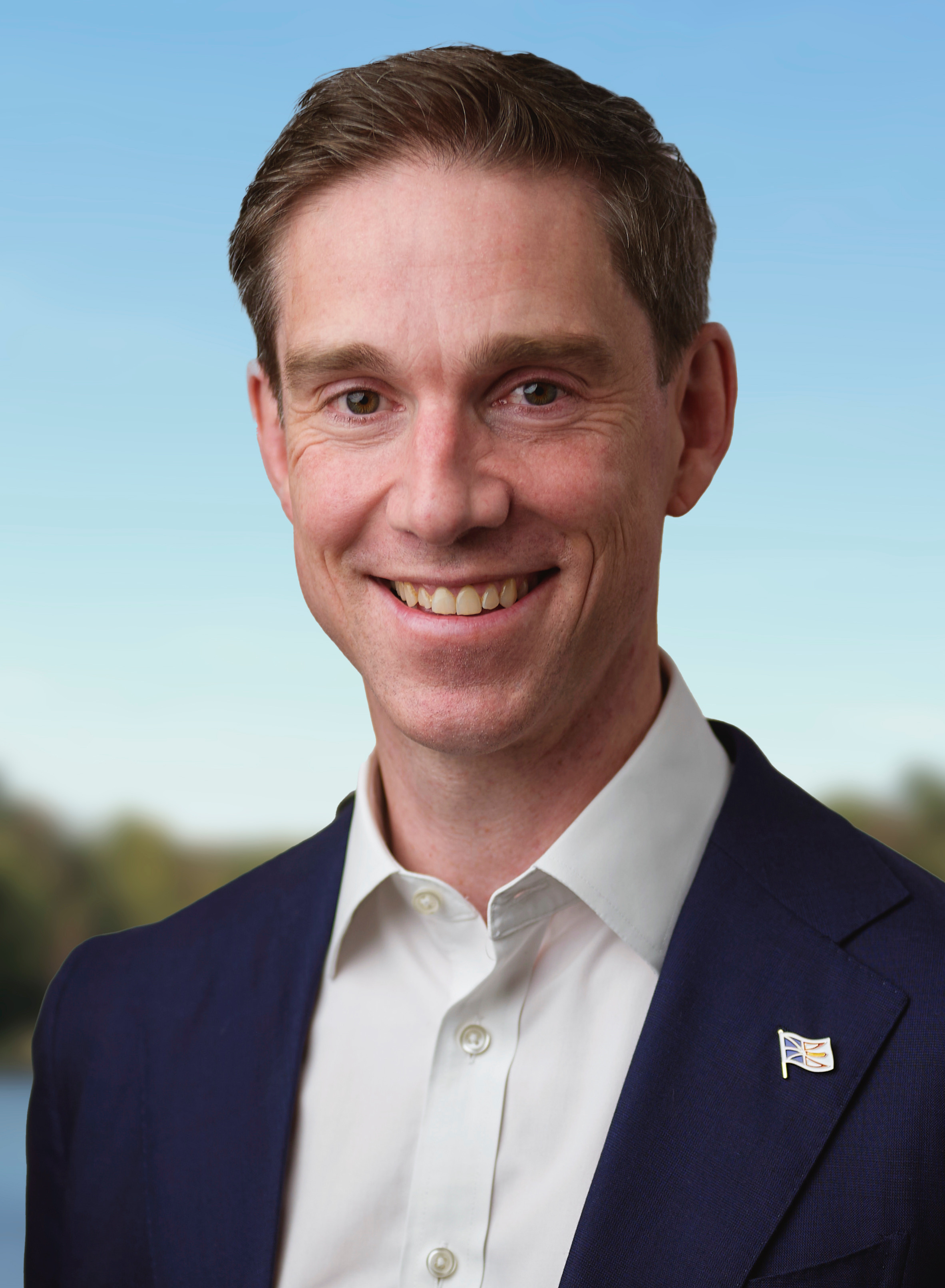

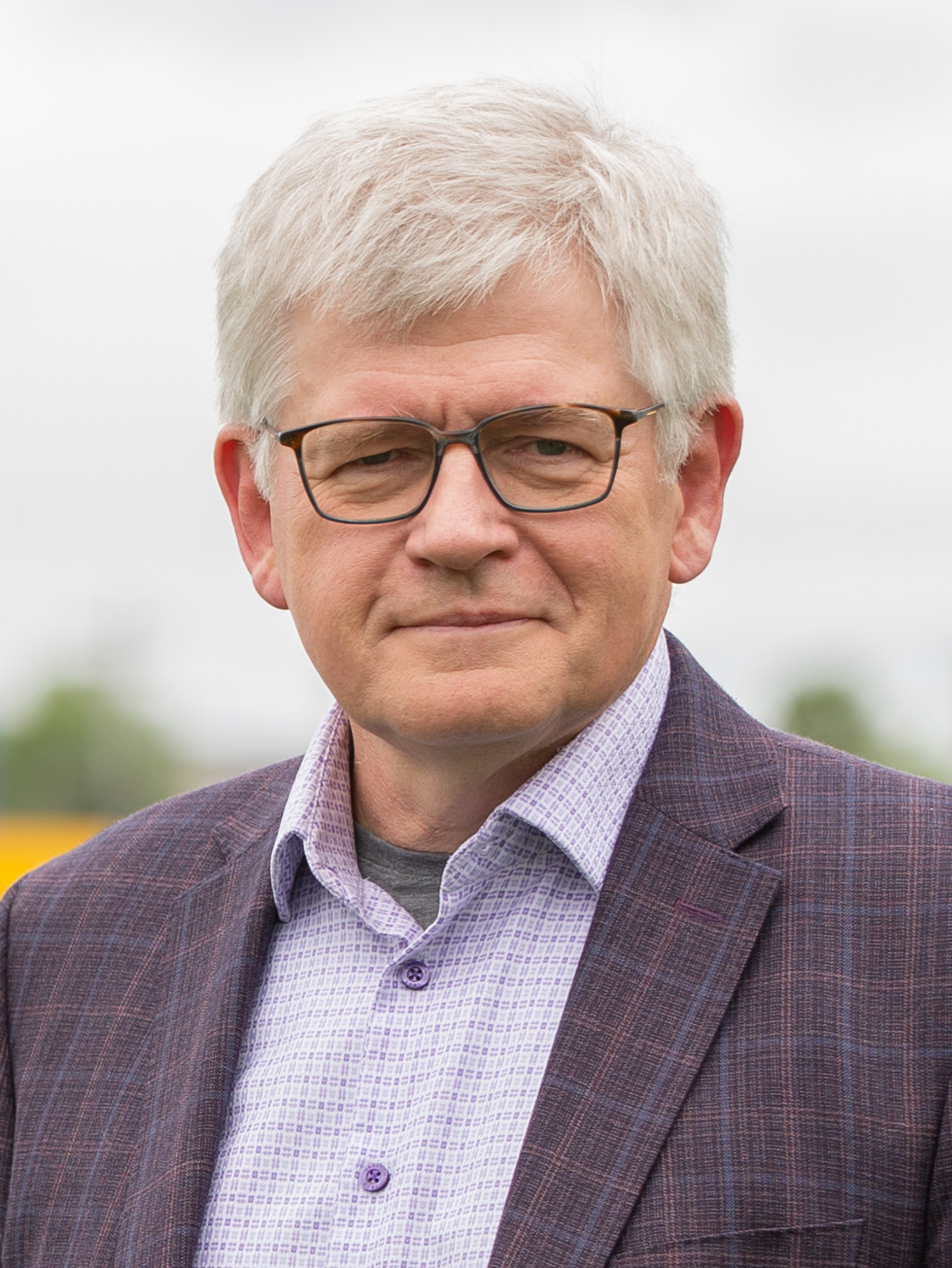
	First party	Second party	Third party
Leader	Tony Wakeham	John Hogan	Jim Dinn
Party	Progressive Conservative	Liberal	New Democratic
Leader since	October 14, 2023	May 3, 2025	October 19, 2021 (Note: On October 19, 2021, Alison Coffin resigned as leader of the NDP. The same day, Dinn would become interim leader. On March 28, 2023, Dinn was officially instated as the permanent leader of the NDP.)
Leader's seat	Stephenville-Port au Port	Windsor Lake	St. John's Centre
Last election	13 seats, 38.80%	22 seats, 48.24%	2 seats, 8.02%
Seats before	14	19	1
Seats won	21	15	2
Seat change	▲7	▼4	▲1
Popular vote	88,548	86,665	16,580
Percentage	44.37%	43.43%	8.31%
Swing	▲5.57pp	▼4.81pp	▲0.29pp
- Map of the 2025 Newfoundland and Labrador Election.
Premier before election
John Hogan
Liberal
Premier after election
Tony Wakeham
Progressive Conservative

The 2025 Newfoundland and Labrador general election was held on October 14, 2025, to elect members to the 51st General Assembly of Newfoundland and Labrador.

In a major upset, Tony Wakeham led the Progressive Conservatives to a majority government for the first time since 2011. With a popular vote share of 44.4%, the PCs won the smallest winning vote share of any majority government in Newfoundland and Labrador's electoral history.

== Background ==
Following the announcement of a new memorandum of understanding with Quebec regarding the Churchill Falls power plant on December 12, 2024, there was speculation by local journalists that Premier Andrew Furey would call an election sometime in early 2025. However, Furey unexpectedly announced his resignation on February 25, 2025, effective upon the election of his successor. John Hogan won the subsequent Liberal leadership election that May.

Premier Hogan requested Lieutenant Governor Joan Marie Aylward issue the writs of election on September 15, 2025. Every party represented in the assembly had elected a new leader since the 2021 election.

Former NDP leader Alison Coffin ran as an independent candidate in both Carbonear-Trinity-Bay de Verde and Harbour Grace-Port de Grave on a platform of election reform. She was the first person since Henry Renouf in the 1869 Newfoundland general election to run in more than one riding.

=== Standings at dissolution ===
Standings in the 50th General Assembly
Affiliation	Leader	House members	
Affiliation	Leader	2021 election results	At dissolution
Liberal	John Hogan	22	19
Progressive Conservative	Tony Wakeham	13	14
New Democratic	Jim Dinn	2	1
Independent	N/A	3	2
Vacant	N/A	0	4

=== Incumbents not standing for re-election ===
Party	MHA	Riding	Date announced	Ref.
Liberal	Perry Trimper	Lake Melville	March 24, 2025	
Liberal	Siobhán Coady	St. John's West	July 7, 2025	
Liberal	Steve Crocker	Carbonear-Trinity-Bay de Verde	July 14, 2025	
Liberal	Scott Reid	St. George's-Humber	July 14, 2025	
Liberal	John Haggie	Gander	July 14, 2025	
Liberal	Gerry Byrne	Corner Brook	July 17, 2025	

=== Timeline ===
- March 31, 2021 – PC leader Ches Crosbie resigns and MHA David Brazil is appointed interim leader and interim Leader of the Opposition.
- October 19, 2021 – St. John's Centre MHA Jim Dinn was named interim leader of the New Democratic Party, following the resignation of Alison Coffin.
- October 25, 2021 – PC MHA Lela Evans leaves the PC caucus to sit as an independent.
- March 7, 2022, Independent MHA Lela Evans joins the NDP caucus.
- July 6, 2022 – A cabinet shuffle takes place, Haggie and Osborne switch portfolios.
- September 12, 2022 – Independent MHA Perry Trimper joins the Liberal caucus.
- March 28, 2023 – Jim Dinn is acclaimed permanent NDP leader.
- June 14, 2023 – Premier Furey shuffles his cabinet.
- October 13–15, 2023 – The Progressive Conservative party leadership convention is held at the Sheraton Hotel in St. John's. MHA Tony Wakeham is elected leader on the second ballot.
- November 10, 2023 – Conception Bay East-Bell Island MHA David Brazil announced his resignation as MHA effective 29 December 2023.
- January 22, 2024 – Cabinet Minister and Fogo Island-Cape Freels MHA Derrick Bragg dies of cancer at the age of 59.
- January 28, 2024 – Conception Bay East-Bell Island by-election is moved to 30 January from its original date of 29 January due to a storm warning.
- January 30, 2024 – Conception Bay East-Bell Island by-election is held. Liberal candidate Fred Hutton is elected, gaining the seat from the Progressive Conservatives.
- February 29, 2024 – MHA Fred Hutton is appointed Minister of Housing and Minister responsible for the Newfoundland and Labrador Housing Corporation.
- March 1, 2024 – Baie Verte-Green Bay MHA Brian Warr resigns.
- April 15, 2024 – Fogo Island-Cape Freels by-election. Progressive Conservative candidate Jim McKenna is elected, gaining the seat from the Liberals.
- May 27, 2024 – Baie Verte-Green Bay by-election. Progressive Conservative candidate Lin Paddock is elected, gaining the seat from the Liberals.
- July 5, 2024 – Health Minister and Waterford Valley MHA Tom Osborne resigns. John Hogan is named interim Health Minister.
- July 16, 2024 – Torngat Mountains MHA Lela Evans rejoins the PC Party.
- July 19, 2024 – Premier Furey shuffles his cabinet. Scott Reid enters cabinet.
- August 22, 2024 – Waterford Valley by-election was held. Liberal Jamie Korab was elected.
- January 6, 2025 – Special session of the House of Assembly to debate the Churchill Falls MOU.
- February 25, 2025 – Andrew Furey announces his pending resignation as Premier, leader of the Liberal party, and as an MHA.
- May 1, 2025 – Andrew Parsons resigns as MHA and Minister of Industry, Energy and Technology.
- May 3, 2025 – Windsor Lake MHA John Hogan wins the 2025 Liberal leadership election.
- May 3, 2025 – Steve Crocker is appointed Minister of Industry, Energy and Technology following the resignation of Andrew Parsons.
- May 9, 2025 – John Hogan was officially sworn in as Premier at the Government House. His Cabinet was also sworn in as well.
- June 11, 2025 – John Abbott announces that later in the summer he would step down as the MHA for St. John's East-Quidi Vidi to avoid a legal battle over the results of the 2021 election in the district.
- July 3, 2025 – Former premier Andrew Furey resigns his seat of Humber-Gros Morne.
- July 7, 2025 – Finance minister and deputy premier Siobhan Coady announces that she will not seek re-election.
- July 14, 2025 – MHAs Steve Crocker, John Haggie, and Scott Reid all announce they will not seek re-election.
- July 17, 2025 – Corner Brook MHA Gerry Byrne announces that he will not seek re-election.
- August 1, 2025 – Jordan Brown resigns as MHA for Labrador West.
- August 15, 2025 – John Abbott resigns as MHA for St. John's East-Quidi Vidi.
- September 15, 2025 – Premier Hogan asks the Lieutenant Governor to dissolve the House of Assembly for a general provincial election.
- October 14, 2025 – Election day.
- November 14, 2025 – Judge Alphonsus Faour grants a judicial recount for Topsail-Paradise, but rejects two other requests for recounts in Lewisporte-Twillingate and Placentia West-Bellevue.
- November 21, 2025 – The Topsail-Paradise recount concludes and reaffirms Paul Dinn's victory.

==== Changes in MHAs/seats held between elections ====
Changes in seats held (2021–2025)
Seat	Before				Change		
Seat	Date	Member	Party	Reason	Date	Member	Party
Torngat Mountains	October 25, 2021	Lela Evans	█ PC	Resignation from PC caucus			█ Independent
Torngat Mountains	March 7, 2022	Lela Evans	█ Independent	Joined the NDP caucus			█ New Democratic
Torngat Mountains	July 16, 2024	Lela Evans	█ New Democratic	Re-joined the PC caucus			█ PC
Lake Melville	September 12, 2022	Perry Trimper	█ Independent	Joined the Liberal caucus			█ Liberal
Conception Bay East-Bell Island	December 29, 2023	David Brazil	█ PC	Resigned from House of Assembly	January 30, 2024	Fred Hutton	█ Liberal
Fogo Island-Cape Freels	January 22, 2024	Derrick Bragg	█ Liberal	Death of incumbent	April 15, 2024	Jim McKenna	█ PC
Baie Verte-Green Bay	March 1, 2024	Brian Warr	█ Liberal	Resigned from House of Assembly	May 27, 2024	Lin Paddock	█ PC
Waterford Valley	July 5, 2024	Tom Osborne	█ Liberal	Resigned from House of Assembly	August 22, 2024	Jamie Korab	█ Liberal
Burgeo-LaPoile	May 1, 2025	Andrew Parsons	█ Liberal	Resigned from House of Assembly			█ Vacant
Humber-Gros Morne	July 3, 2025	Andrew Furey	█ Liberal	Resigned from House of Assembly			█ Vacant
Labrador West	August 1, 2025	Jordan Brown	█ New Democratic	Resigned from House of Assembly			█ Vacant
St. John's East-Quidi Vidi	August 15, 2025	John Abbott	█ Liberal	Resigned from House of Assembly			█ Vacant

=== Campaign ===
Issues in the election included the Churchill Falls memorandum of understanding, the cost-of-living, crime, healthcare, and housing. The leaders' debate was held on October 8, with the NDP's Dinn, Liberals' Hogan, and PC's Wakeham all invited. The CBC's Carolyn Stokes hosted.

==== Party slogans ====
Party	Slogan
█ Liberal	"Real Momentum. Real Energy. Real Leadership."
█ PC	"For All of Us"
█ New Democratic	"Get a Better Deal"

=== Results by district ===
- Names in **boldface type** represent party leaders.
- † indicates that the incumbent is not seeking re-election.

==== St. John's ====
Electoral district	Candidates			Incumbent
Electoral district	Liberal	PC	NDP	Incumbent
Mount Scio; 40.70% turnout	Sarah Stoodley; 2,006; 46.13%	Darrell Hynes; 1,551; 35.66%	Laurabel Mba; 792; 18.21%	Sarah Stoodley
St. John's Centre; 39.46% turnout	Gemma Hickey; 1,003; 26.00%	Ben Duggan; 457; 11.85%	**Jim Dinn**; 2,398; 62.16%	**Jim Dinn**
St. John's East-Quidi Vidi; 52.44% turnout	John Whelan; 2,458; 42.50%	Alex Edwards-Cepovski; 440; 7.61%	Sheilagh O'Leary; 2,886; 49.90%	Vacant (Note: John Abbott had been elected in 2021, but he resigned his seat on August 15, 2025 to avoid a prolonged lawsuit over the disputed election results in his riding.)
St. John's West; 45.05% turnout	Keith White; 2,354; 53.77%	Kristina Ennis; 1,472; 33.62%	Marius Normore; 552; 12.61%	Siobhan Coady†
Virginia Waters-Pleasantville; 51.30% turnout	Bernard Davis; 3,366; 61.97%	G. Patrick Condon; 986; 18.15%	Raj Sharan; 1,080; 19.88%	Bernard Davis
Waterford Valley; 49.11% turnout	Jamie Korab; 2,527; 47.20%	David Thomlyn; 1,467; 27.40%	Nicole Boland; 1,360; 25.40%	Jamie Korab
Windsor Lake; 47.53% turnout	**John Hogan**; 3,424; 69.27%	Deanne Stapleton; 1,052; 21.28%	Marcia Porter; 467; 9.45%	**John Hogan**

==== St. John's suburbs ====
Electoral district	Candidates				Incumbent
Electoral district	Liberal	PC	NDP	Independent	Incumbent
Cape St. Francis; 57.83% turnout	Kara Connors; 2,457; 39.39%	Joedy Wall; 3,388; 54.32%	Greg Rockwood; 392; 6.29%		Joedy Wall
Conception Bay East–Bell Island; 48.76% turnout	Fred Hutton; 3,730; 57.23%	Tina Neary; 2,285; 35.06%	Henry House; 503; 7.72%		Fred Hutton
Conception Bay South; 48.95% turnout	Ken McDonald; 2,043; 37.75%	Barry Petten; 3,060; 56.54%	Rhonda Watkins; 309; 5.71%		Barry Petten
Mount Pearl North; 45.19% turnout	Lucy Stoyles; 3,038; 58.41%	Jim Lester; 1,733; 33.32%	Donn Sears; 430; 8.27%		Lucy Stoyles
Mount Pearl-Southlands; 53.98% turnout	Sarah Furlong; 1,682; 28.38%	Bryan Robbins; 666; 11.24%	Brenda Walsh; 217; 3.66%	Paul Lane; 3,361; 56.72%	Paul Lane
Topsail-Paradise (Note: A judicial recount was held in this district which reaffirmed Dinn's victory.); 50.74% turnout	Dan Bobbett; 2,923; 46.35%	Paul Dinn; 3,029; 48.03%	Tyler Bourne; 354; 5.61%		Paul Dinn

==== Avalon Peninsula ====
Electoral district	Candidates				Incumbent
Electoral district	Liberal	PC	NDP	Independent	Incumbent
Carbonear-Trinity-Bay de Verde; 63.91% turnout	Danielle Doyle; 3,085; 44.49%	Riley Balsom; 3,459; 49.88%	Kathleen Burt; 242; 3.49%	Alison Coffin (Note: Coffin ran as an independent candidate in both Carbonear-Trinity-Bay de Verde and Harbour Grace-Port de Grave as a protest in favour of electoral reform. There was no provision in the Elections Act 1991 which prohibited a candidate from simultaneously running in two separate districts.); 134; 1.93%	Steve Crocker†
Carbonear-Trinity-Bay de Verde; 63.91% turnout	Danielle Doyle; 3,085; 44.49%	Riley Balsom; 3,459; 49.88%	Kathleen Burt; 242; 3.49%	Edward Thomas Cole; 15; 0.22%	Steve Crocker†
Ferryland; 61.49% turnout	Cheryl O'Brien; 2,904; 43.64%	Loyola O'Driscoll; 3,507; 52.71%	Josh Meadus; 243; 3.65%		Loyola O'Driscoll
Harbour Grace-Port de Grave; 58.14% turnout	Pam Parsons; 3,750; 59.20%	Walter Yetman; 2,241; 35.38%	Darian Vincent; 110; 1.74%	Alison Coffin; 233; 3.68%	Pam Parsons
Harbour Main; 58.00% turnout	Don Lewis; 2,297; 33.58%	Helen Conway-Ottenheimer; 4,187; 61.21%	Dion Hynes; 263; 3.85%	Clem Whittle; 93; 1.36%	Helen Conway-Ottenheimer
Placentia-St. Mary's; 66.74% turnout	Sherry Gambin-Walsh; 2,973; 49.91%	Rhonda Power; 2,470; 41.46%	Douglas Meggison; 176; 2.95%	Philip Gardiner; 338; 5.67%	Sherry Gambin-Walsh

==== Eastern Newfoundland ====
Electoral district	Candidates			Incumbent
Electoral district	Liberal	PC	NDP	Incumbent
Bonavista; 52.67% turnout	Heather Matthews; 1,037; 22.79%	Craig Pardy; 3,260; 71.65%	David Ellis; 253; 5.56%	Craig Pardy
Burin-Grand Bank; 57.43% turnout	Paul Pike; 2,437; 49.11%	Jamie Engram; 2,384; 48.05%	Tori Locke; 141; 2.84%	Paul Pike
Placentia West-Bellevue; 58.48% turnout	Brian Keating; 2,577; 45.97%	Jeff Dwyer; 2,641; 47.11%	Jasmine Paul; 388; 6.92%	Jeff Dwyer
Terra Nova; 56.86% turnout	Greg French; 1,704; 29.33%	Lloyd Parrott; 3,875; 66.70%	Melanie Adams; 231; 3.98%	Lloyd Parrott

==== Central Newfoundland ====
Electoral district	Candidates				Incumbent
Electoral district	Liberal	PC	NDP	Independent	Incumbent
Baie Verte-Green Bay; 50.37% turnout	Owen Burt; 1,013; 20.69%	Lin Paddock; 3,643; 74.42%	Sarah Hillier; 239; 4.88%		Lin Paddock
Exploits; 57.96% turnout	Fabian Power; 2,019; 36.15%	Pleaman Forsey; 3,406; 60.98%	Dawn Lahey; 160; 2.86%		Pleaman Forsey
Fogo Island-Cape Freels; 49.09% turnout	Dale Lewis; 2,208; 43.96%	Jim McKenna; 2,602; 51.80%	Albert Murphy; 69; 1.37%	Garry Leyte; 144; 2.87%	Jim McKenna
Fortune Bay-Cape La Hune; 54.90% turnout	Elvis Loveless; 1,842; 65.95%	Ada John; 903; 32.33%	Eamon Carew; 48; 1.72%		Elvis Loveless
Gander; 49.60% turnout	Bettina Ford; 3,063; 58.29%	Tom Healey; 2,054; 39.09%	Justin Foley; 138; 2.63%		John Haggie†
Grand Falls-Windsor-Buchans; 57.43% turnout	Barry Manuel; 2,144; 37.09%	Chris Tibbs; 3,408; 58.95%	Liz Noseworthy; 229; 3.96%		Chris Tibbs
Lewisporte-Twillingate; 53.29% turnout	Derek Bennett; 2,552; 48.95%	Mark Butt; 2,570; 49.30%	Steven Kent; 76; 1.46%	Stacy Coish; 15; 0.29%	Derek Bennett

==== Western Newfoundland ====
Electoral district	Candidates				Incumbent
Electoral district	Liberal	PC	NDP	Independent	Incumbent
Burgeo-La Poile; 53.14% turnout	Michael King; 2,001; 59.84%	Victoria Young; 1,259; 37.65%	Judy Vanta; 84; 2.51%		Vacant (Note: Andrew Parsons had been elected in 2021, but he resigned from the House of Assembly on May 1, 2025, leaving the district vacant.)
Corner Brook; 39.20% turnout	Jim Parsons; 2,347; 56.94%	Charles Pender; 1,420; 34.45%	Jean Graham; 355; 8.61%		Gerry Byrne†
Humber-Bay of Islands; 49.89% turnout	Meghan Parsons; 735; 15.44%	Ethan Wheeler-Park; 514; 10.80%	Collin Glavac; 77; 1.62%	Eddie Joyce; 3,433; 72.14%	Eddie Joyce
Humber-Gros Morne; 57.78% turnout	Helen Reid; 2,093; 37.52%	Mike Goosney; 3,238; 58.05%	Rebecca Brushett; 247; 4.43%		Vacant (Note: Andrew Furey had been elected in 2021, but he resigned his seat in the House of Assembly on July 3, 2025, leaving the district vacant.)
St. Barbe-L'Anse aux Meadows; 56.74% turnout	Krista Howell; 2,001; 42.55%	Andrea Barbour; 2,596; 55.20%	Beth Ryan; 106; 2.25%		Krista Howell
St. George's-Humber; 55.10% turnout	Mark Lamswood; 2,366; 45.31%	Hal Cormier; 2,648; 50.71%	Jim McKeown; 208; 3.98%		Scott Reid†
Stephenville-Port au Port; 53.29% turnout	Jeff Young; 1,044; 20.85%	**Tony Wakeham**; 3,820; 76.29%	Susan Jarvis; 143; 2.86%		**Tony Wakeham**

==== Labrador ====
Electoral district	Candidates			Incumbent
Electoral district	Liberal	PC	NDP	Incumbent
Cartwright-L'Anse au Clair; 54.48% turnout	Lisa Dempster; 789; 53.75%	Nina Rumbolt-Pye; 641; 43.66%	Patricia Bailey; 38; 2.59%	Lisa Dempster
Labrador West; 53.19% turnout	Todd Seward; 1,364; 39.34%	Joseph Power; 1,639; 47.27%	Shazia Razi; 464; 13.38%	Vacant (Note: Jordan Brown had been elected in 2021, but he resigned from the House of Assembly on August 1, 2025, leaving the district vacant.)
Lake Melville; 45.30% turnout	Shaun Maclean; 1,280; 41.29%	Keith Russell; 1,718; 55.42%	Jamie Ruby; 102; 3.29%	Perry Trimper†
Torngat Mountains; 40.95% turnout	Tony Powell; 29; 3.23%	Lela Evans; 859; 95.66%	MK Morris; 10; 1.11%	Lela Evans

== Opinion polling ==

Polling firm	Dates conducted	Link	Liberal	PC	NDP	Others	Margin of error	Sample size	Polling method	Lead
Forum Research	Oct 11, 2025		47.4%	37.0%	12.3%	3.3%	±4.0%	1,067	IVR	10.4%
Mainstreet Research	Oct 9–10, 2025		52%	32%	13%	3%	±3%	1,100	Smart IVR	20%
Cardinal Research	Oct 7–10, 2025		49%	41%	8%	2%	±4.9%	418	IVR	8%
Independent Insights	Sep 28 – Oct 10, 2025		31.1%	48.3%	16.4%	4.2%	±9.2%	230	Online	17.2%
MQO Research	Oct 4–7, 2025		43%	40%	13%	3%	±5.1%	435	Telephone/Online	3%
	Sep 15, 2025	Election campaign begins.								
Narrative Research	Aug 7–29, 2025		59%	31%	9%	—	±5.2%	350	Telephone	28%
Canadian Election Study	Apr 29 – May 13, 2025		56%	36%	8%	1%	N/A	118	Online	20%
	May 3, 2025	John Hogan is elected Liberal leader. He is sworn-in as premier on May 9.								
	Feb 25, 2025	Andrew Furey announces his resignation as premier and Liberal leader.								
Narrative Research	Nov 4–19, 2024		50%	40%	10%	0%	±5.2%	350	Telephone	10%
Narrative Research	Aug 6–16, 2024		43%	35%	19%	2%	±5.2%	350	Telephone	8%
Narrative Research	May 7–29, 2024		38%	41%	19%	2%	±6.8%	208	Telephone	3%
Narrative Research	Feb 7–18, 2024		43%	33%	23%	1%	±5.2%	350	Telephone	10%
Narrative Research	Nov 2–26, 2023		44%	38%	16%	3%	±5.0%	388	Telephone	6%
	Oct 14, 2023	Tony Wakeham is elected leader of the PCs.								
Abacus Data	Sep 19–25, 2023		40%	38%	21%	1%	±4.5%	341	Online	2%
Narrative Research	Aug 1–11, 2023		40%	37%	23%	0%	±5.2%	350	Telephone	3%
Narrative Research	May 4–15, 2023	(Note: "Liberals have a stronger lead in terms of voter support" (PDF). Narrative Research. May 24, 2023.)	50%	31%	17%	2%	±5.2%	350	Telephone	19%
	Mar 28, 2023	Jim Dinn is acclaimed permanent NDP leader.								
Narrative Research	Feb 17–21, 2023		46%	36%	17%	0%	±5.2%	350	Telephone	10%
Narrative Research	Nov 3–27, 2022		47%	34%	16%	3%	±4.2%	535	Telephone	13%
Narrative Research	Aug 3–23, 2022		40%	42%	16%	1%	±6.0%	260	Telephone	2%
Angus Reid	Jun 7–13, 2022		36%	45%	12%	6%	±7.0%	201	Online	9%
Narrative Research	May 5–24, 2022		48%	32%	17%	3%	±5.9%	275	Telephone	16%
Angus Reid	Mar 10–15, 2022		43%	44%	10%	4%	±7.0%	196	Online	1%
Narrative Research	Feb 8–21, 2022		49%	32%	15%	3%	±5.2%	350	Telephone	17%
Angus Reid	Jan 7–12, 2022		37%	44%	15%	4%	±8.0%	155	Online	7%
MQO Research	Nov 19 – Dec 5, 2021		47%	31%	18%	4%	±5.5%	400	Telephone	16%
Narrative Research	Nov 2–23, 2021		48%	27%	23%	2%	±3.5%	800	Telephone	21%
	Oct 19, 2021	Alison Coffin resigns as leader of the NDP; Jim Dinn becomes interim leader.								
Angus Reid	Sep 29 – Oct 3, 2021		39%	39%	17%	5%	N/A	203	Online	Tie
Narrative Research	Aug 9–29, 2021		53%	28%	18%	1%	±4.9%	400	Telephone	25%
MQO Research	Jun 12 – Jul 10, 2021		56%	26%	15%	2%	±4.9%	400	Telephone	30%
Angus Reid	Jun 2–7, 2021		50%	39%	8%	2%	±2.0%	153	Online	11%
Narrative Research	May 11–26, 2021		54%	30%	14%	2%	±3.5%	800	Telephone	24%
	Apr 8, 2021	Andrew Furey and his cabinet sworn in.								
	Mar 31, 2021	Ches Crosbie resigns as leader of the PCs; David Brazil becomes interim leader.								
2021 general election	Mar 25, 2021	HTML	48.24%	38.80%	8.02%	4.93%	—N/a	178,632	—N/a	9.44%
Polling firm	Dates conducted	Link				Others	Margin of error	Sample size	Polling method	Lead
Polling firm	Dates conducted	Link	Liberal	PC	NDP	Others	Margin of error	Sample size	Polling method	Lead

== Results ==
The election resulted in a majority government for the Progressive Conservatives. The incumbent Liberals had been in government for 10 years.

Summary of the 2025 Newfoundland and Labrador general election results
Political party	Party leader	Candidates	MHAs				Popular vote		
Political party	Party leader	Candidates	2021	Diss.	2025	±	#	%	± (pp)
Progressive Conservative	Tony Wakeham	40	13	14	21	▲7	88,548	44.37%	▲5.57
Liberal	John Hogan	40	22	19	15	▼4	86,665	43.43%	▼4.81
New Democratic	Jim Dinn	40	2	1	2	▲1	16,580	8.31%	▲0.29
Independent		9 (Note: Note that this figure counts Alison Coffin as two candidates as she ran in two separate districts.)	3	2	2	Steady	7,766	3.89%	▼0.73
Total		129	40	40	40	Steady	199,559	100%	–

↓
21	15	2	2
Progressive Conservative	Liberal	NDP	Ind

=== Analytical charts ===
Ternary plots of election results
2025

2021
Electoral districts won identified by Liberal (red), PC (blue), NDP (orange) and Independents (grey).

=== Synopsis of results ===
2025 Newfoundland and Labrador general election - synopsis of riding results
Riding (Note: sorted as per results summary)	Winning party							Votes				
Riding	2021	1st place	Votes	Share	Margin #	Margin %	2nd place	PC	Lib	NDP	Ind	Total
Baie Verte-Green Bay	Lib	PC	3,643	74.42%	2,630	53.73%	Lib	3,643	1,013	239	–	4,895
Bonavista	PC	PC	3,260	71.65%	2,223	48.86%	Lib	3,260	1,037	253	–	4,550
Burgeo-La Poile	Lib	Lib	2,001	59.84%	742	22.19%	PC	1,259	2,001	84	–	3,344
Burin-Grand Bank	Lib	Lib	2,438	49.12%	54	1.09%	PC	2,384	2,438	141	–	4,963
Cape St. Francis	PC	PC	3,388	54.32%	931	14.93%	Lib	3,388	2,457	392	–	6,237
Carbonear-Trinity-Bay de Verde	Lib	PC	3,459	49.88%	374	5.39%	Lib	3,459	3,085	242	149 (Note: Alison Coffin stood as an independent candidate in two ridings. She received 134 votes in Carbonear and 233 in Harbour Grace. She was the first person since Henry Renouf in 1869 to run in more than one riding.)	6,935
Cartwright-L'Anse au Clair	Lib	Lib	789	53.75%	148	10.08%	PC	641	789	38	–	1,468
Conception Bay East–Bell Island	PC	Lib	3,730	57.23%	1,445	22.17%	PC	2,285	3,730	503	–	6,518
Conception Bay South	PC	PC	3,060	56.54%	1,017	18.79%	Lib	3,060	2,043	309	–	5,412
Corner Brook	Lib	Lib	2,347	56.94%	927	22.49%	PC	1,420	2,347	355	–	4,122
Exploits	PC	PC	3,406	60.98%	1,387	24.83%	Lib	3,406	2,019	160	–	5,585
Ferryland	PC	PC	3,507	52.71%	603	9.06%	Lib	3,507	2,904	243	–	6,654
Fogo Island-Cape Freels	Lib	PC	2,602	51.79%	394	7.84%	Lib	2,602	2,208	70	144	5,024
Fortune Bay-Cape La Hune	Lib	Lib	1,844	65.97%	941	33.67%	PC	903	1,844	48	–	2,795
Gander	Lib	Lib	3,063	58.29%	1,009	19.20%	PC	2,054	3,063	138	–	5,255
Grand Falls-Windsor-Buchans	PC	PC	3,408	58.95%	1,264	21.86%	Lib	3,408	2,144	229	–	5,781
Harbour Grace-Port de Grave	Lib	Lib	3,750	59.20%	1,509	23.82%	PC	2,241	3,750	110	233	6,334
Harbour Main	PC	PC	4,187	61.21%	1,890	27.63%	Lib	4,187	2,297	263	93	6,840
Humber-Bay of Islands	Ind	Ind	3,433	72.14%	2,698	56.69%	Lib	514	735	77	3,433	4,759
Humber-Gros Morne	Lib	PC	3,239	58.09%	1,149	20.61%	Lib	3,239	2,090	247	–	5,576
Labrador West	NDP	PC	1,639	47.27%	275	7.93%	Lib	1,639	1,364	464	–	3,467
Lake Melville	Ind	PC	1,718	55.42%	438	14.13%	Lib	1,718	1,280	102	–	3,100
Lewisporte-Twillingate	Lib	PC	2,570	49.30%	18	0.35%	Lib	2,570	2,552	76	15	5,213
Mount Pearl-Southlands	Ind	Ind	3,361	56.72%	1,679	28.33%	Lib	666	1,682	217	3,361	5,926
Mount Pearl North	Lib	Lib	3,038	58.41%	1,305	25.09%	PC	1,733	3,038	430	–	5,201
Mount Scio	Lib	Lib	2,006	46.13%	455	10.46%	PC	1,551	2,006	792	–	4,349
Placentia-St. Mary's	Lib	Lib	2,972	49.90%	502	8.43%	PC	2,470	2,972	176	338	5,956
Placentia West-Bellevue	PC	PC	2,641	47.11%	64	1.14%	Lib	2,641	2,577	388	–	5,606
St. Barbe-L'Anse aux Meadows	Lib	PC	2,596	55.20%	595	12.65%	Lib	2,596	2,001	106	–	4,703
St. George's-Humber	Lib	PC	2,648	50.71%	282	5.40%	Lib	2,648	2,366	208	–	5,222
St. John's Centre	NDP	NDP	2,398	62.16%	1,395	36.16%	Lib	457	1,003	2,398	–	3,858
St. John's East-Quidi Vidi	Lib	NDP	2,886	49.90%	428	7.40%	Lib	440	2,458	2,886	–	5,784
St. John's West	Lib	Lib	2,354	53.77%	882	20.15%	PC	1,472	2,354	552	–	4,378
Stephenville-Port au Port	PC	PC	3,820	76.29%	2,776	55.44%	Lib	3,820	1,044	143	–	5,007
Terra Nova	PC	PC	3,875	66.70%	2,171	37.37%	Lib	3,875	1,704	231	–	5,810
Topsail-Paradise	PC	PC	3,029	48.03%	106	1.68%	Lib	3,029	2,923	354	–	6,306
Torngat Mountains	PC	PC	859	95.66%	830	92.43%	Lib	859	29	10	–	898
Virginia Waters-Pleasantville	Lib	Lib	3,366	61.97%	2,286	42.08%	NDP	986	3,366	1,080	–	5,432
Waterford Valley	Lib	Lib	2,527	47.20%	1,060	19.80%	PC	1,467	2,527	1,360	–	5,354
Windsor Lake	Lib	Lib	3,424	69.27%	2,372	47.99%	PC	1,052	3,424	467	–	4,943

= open seat
= winning candidate was in previous Legislature
= incumbent had switched allegiance
= not incumbent; was previously elected to the Legislature
= incumbency arose from byelection gain
= previously incumbent in another riding
= other incumbents renominated
= previously an MP in the House of Commons of Canada
= multiple candidates

=== Winning shares and swings ===
Summary of riding results by vote share for winning candidate and swing (vs 2021)
Riding and winning party			Vote share (Note: Share won by winning candidate, with difference noted from share achieved by the same party in 2021.)		Swing (Note: Positive indicates improvement to standing of party winning in 2021; negative points to 2021's second-place party being swung to.)	
Riding and winning party			%	Change (pp)	To	Change (pp)
Baie Verte – Green Bay	PC	Gain	74.42	26.49	PC	-28.93
Bonavista	PC	Hold	71.65	14.32	PC	8.55
Burgeo – La Poile	Lib	Hold	59.84	-27.26	PC	-27.32
Burin – Grand Bank	Lib	Hold	49.12	-10.47	PC	-10.93
Cape St. Francis	PC	Hold	54.32	-8.19	Lib	-9.66
Carbonear – Trinity – Bay de Verde	PC	Gain	49.88	22.18	PC	-22.62
Cartwright – L’Anse au Clair	Lib	Hold	53.75	-41.46	PC	-40.16
Conception Bay East – Bell Island	Lib	Gain	57.23	24.14	Lib	-22.64
Conception Bay South	PC	Hold	56.54	-0.55	Lib	-1.06
Corner Brook	Lib	Hold	56.94	-9.6	PC	-5.29
Exploits	PC	Hold	60.98	6.18	PC	7.61
Ferryland	PC	Hold	52.71	0.37	PC	0.43
Fogo Island – Cape Freels	PC	Gain	51.79	15.15	PC	-16.13
Fortune Bay – Cape La Hune	Lib	Hold	65.97	-2.25	PC	-3.02
Gander	Lib	Hold	58.29	-12.65	PC	-12.9
Grand Falls-Windsor – Buchans	PC	Hold	58.95	-0.29	PC	0.55
Harbour Grace – Port de Grave	Lib	Hold	59.20	-11.89	PC	-11.43
Harbour Main	PC	Hold	61.21	6.74	PC	7.39
Humber – Bay of Islands	Ind	Hold	72.14	0.53	Ind	1.42
Humber – Gros Morne	PC	Gain	58.09	24.46	PC	-25.47
Labrador West	PC	Gain	47.27	26.03	Lib	-23.64
Lake Melville	PC	Gain	55.42	31.55	N/A (Note: Perry Trimper, the Independent candidate who won in 2021, opted not to stand for reelection.)	
Lewisporte – Twillingate	PC	Gain	49.30	11.74	PC	-12.61
Mount Pearl – Southlands	Ind	Hold	56.72	-2.89	Lib	-3.65
Mount Pearl North	Lib	Hold	58.41	11.72	Lib	11.5
Mount Scio	Lib	Hold	46.13	-0.48	PC	-4.72
Placentia – St. Mary’s	Lib	Hold	49.90	-0.95	Lib	2.06
Placentia West – Bellevue	PC	Hold	47.11	-7.21	Lib	-5.48
St. Barbe – L’Anse aux Meadows	PC	Gain	55.20	8.69	PC	-8.65
St. George’s – Humber	PC	Gain	50.71	15.05	PC	-14.14
St. John’s Centre	NDP	Hold	62.16	9.78	NDP	8.69
St. John’s East – Quidi Vidi	NDP	Gain	49.90	7.87	NDP	-4.17
St. John’s West	Lib	Hold	53.77	-4.06	PC	-2.82
Stephenville – Port au Port	PC	Hold	76.29	16.63	PC	16.81
Terra Nova	PC	Hold	66.70	13.5	PC	13.86
Topsail – Paradise	PC	Hold	48.03	-2.56	Lib	-3.42
Torngat Mountains	PC	Hold	95.66	6.86	PC	6.79
Virginia Waters – Pleasantville	Lib	Hold	61.97	2.36	Lib	2.58
Waterford Valley	Lib	Hold	47.20	-19.59	PC	-10.96
Windsor Lake	Lib	Hold	69.27	18.69	Lib	18.97

=== Changes in party vote shares ===
Share change analysis by party and riding (2025 vs 2021)
Riding	Liberal		NDP		PC	
Riding	%	Change (pp)	%	Change (pp)	%	Change (pp)
Baie Verte – Green Bay	20.69	-31.37	4.88	4.88	74.42	26.49
Bonavista	22.79	-2.77	5.56	3.66	71.65	14.32
Burgeo – La Poile	59.84	-27.26	2.51	-0.11	37.65	27.37
Burin – Grand Bank	49.12	-10.47	2.84	-0.94	48.04	11.40
Cape St. Francis	39.39	11.14	6.29	-1.79	54.32	-8.19
Carbonear – Trinity – Bay de Verde	44.48	-23.05	3.49	-1.04	49.88	22.18
Cartwright – L’Anse au Clair	53.75	-41.46	2.59	2.59	43.66	38.87
Conception Bay East – Bell Island	57.23	24.14	7.72	-3.01	35.06	-21.13
Conception Bay South	37.75	1.57	5.71	1.52	56.54	-0.55
Corner Brook	56.94	-9.60	8.61	8.61	34.45	0.99
Exploits	36.15	-9.05	2.86	2.86	60.98	6.18
Ferryland	43.64	-0.49	3.65	0.12	52.71	0.37
Fogo Island – Cape Freels	43.95	-17.10	1.39	-0.92	51.79	15.15
Fortune Bay – Cape La Hune	65.97	-2.25	1.72	-1.53	32.31	3.78
Gander	58.29	-12.65	2.63	-0.50	39.09	13.15
Grand Falls-Windsor – Buchans	37.09	-1.38	3.96	1.67	58.95	-0.29
Harbour Grace – Port de Grave	59.20	-11.89	1.74	-2.75	35.38	10.97
Harbour Main	33.58	-8.04	3.85	-0.06	61.21	6.74
Humber – Bay of Islands	15.44	-2.31	1.62	1.62	10.80	0.16
Humber – Gros Morne	37.48	-26.48	4.43	2.02	58.09	24.46
Labrador West	39.34	10.62	13.38	-36.65	47.27	26.03
Lake Melville	41.29	27.94	3.29	-8.88	55.42	31.55
Lewisporte – Twillingate	48.95	-13.48	1.46	1.46	49.30	11.74
Mount Pearl – Southlands	28.38	4.40	3.66	1.03	11.24	-2.55
Mount Pearl North	58.41	11.72	8.27	1.79	33.32	-11.28
Mount Scio	46.13	-0.48	18.21	-6.68	35.66	8.97
Placentia – St. Mary’s	49.90	-0.95	2.96	2.96	41.47	-5.07
Placentia West – Bellevue	45.97	3.76	6.92	3.46	47.11	-7.21
St. Barbe – L’Anse aux Meadows	42.55	-8.62	2.25	1.44	55.20	8.69
St. George’s – Humber	45.31	-13.23	3.98	-0.64	50.71	15.05
St. John’s Centre	26.00	-7.60	62.16	9.78	11.85	-2.18
St. John’s East – Quidi Vidi	42.50	-0.46	49.90	7.87	7.61	-7.42
St. John’s West	53.77	-4.06	12.61	2.46	33.62	1.59
Stephenville – Port au Port	20.85	-17.00	2.86	0.38	76.29	16.63
Terra Nova	29.33	-14.23	3.98	0.73	66.70	13.50
Topsail – Paradise	46.35	4.28	5.61	-1.72	48.03	-2.56
Torngat Mountains	3.23	-0.15	1.11	-6.71	95.66	6.86
Virginia Waters – Pleasantville	61.97	2.36	19.88	0.45	18.15	-2.81
Waterford Valley	47.20	-19.59	25.40	17.26	27.40	2.33
Windsor Lake	69.27	18.69	9.45	0.57	21.28	-19.25

= did not field a candidate in 2021

=== Relative party strengths (measured by swing) ===
Party on party swings by riding (PC/Liberal/NDP, 2025 vs 2021) (Note: Positive swings are for the second party of the pair; negatives are towards the first party shown.)
Riding	↔ Liberal/PC	↔ Liberal/NDP	↔ PC/NDP
Baie Verte – Green Bay	28.93	N/A (Note: NDP did not field a candidate in 2021.)	
Bonavista	8.55	3.22	-5.33
Burgeo – La Poile	27.32	13.58	-13.74
Burin – Grand Bank	10.93	4.76	-6.17
Cape St. Francis	-9.66	-6.47	3.2
Carbonear – Trinity – Bay de Verde	22.62	11.01	-11.61
Cartwright – L’Anse au Clair	40.16	N/A	
Conception Bay East – Bell Island	-22.64	-13.58	9.06
Conception Bay South	-1.06	-0.03	1.03
Corner Brook	5.29	N/A	
Exploits	7.61	N/A	
Ferryland	0.43	0.3	-0.13
Fogo Island – Cape Freels	16.13	8.09	-8.03
Fortune Bay – Cape La Hune	3.02	0.36	-2.66
Gander	12.9	6.07	-6.82
Grand Falls-Windsor – Buchans	0.55	1.52	0.98
Harbour Grace – Port de Grave	11.43	4.57	-6.86
Harbour Main	7.39	3.99	-3.4
Humber – Bay of Islands	1.24	N/A	
Humber – Gros Morne	25.47	14.25	-11.22
Labrador West	7.7	-23.64	-31.34
Lake Melville	1.81	-18.41	-20.22
Lewisporte – Twillingate	12.61	N/A	
Mount Pearl – Southlands	-3.48	-1.69	1.79
Mount Pearl North	-11.5	-4.97	6.53
Mount Scio	4.72	-3.1	-7.82
Placentia – St. Mary’s	-2.06	N/A	
Placentia West – Bellevue	-5.48	-0.15	5.34
St. Barbe – L’Anse aux Meadows	8.65	5.03	-3.63
St. George’s – Humber	14.14	6.3	-7.85
St. John’s Centre	2.71	8.69	5.98
St. John’s East – Quidi Vidi	-3.48	4.17	7.65
St. John’s West	2.82	3.26	0.44
Stephenville – Port au Port	16.81	8.69	-8.12
Terra Nova	13.86	7.48	-6.38
Topsail – Paradise	-3.42	-3	0.42
Torngat Mountains	3.51	-3.28	-6.79
Virginia Waters – Pleasantville	-2.58	-0.96	1.63
Waterford Valley	10.96	18.42	7.46
Windsor Lake	-18.97	-9.06	9.91

=== Seats changing hands ===
Riding	Party before	MHA before	Party after	MHA after
Carbonear-Trinity-Bay de Verde	Liberal	Steve Crocker	Progressive Conservative	Riley Balsom
St. George's-Humber	Liberal	Scott Reid	Progressive Conservative	Hal Cormier
St. Barbe-L'Anse aux Meadows	Liberal	Krista Howell	Progressive Conservative	Andrea Barbour
Humber-Gros Morne	Liberal	Andrew Furey	Progressive Conservative	Mike Goosney
Lewisporte-Twillingate	Liberal	Derek Bennett	Progressive Conservative	Mark Butt
Lake Melville	Liberal	Perry Trimper	Progressive Conservative	Keith Russell
St. John's East-Quidi Vidi	Liberal	John Abbott	New Democratic	Sheilagh O'Leary
Labrador West	New Democratic	Jordan Brown	Progressive Conservative	Joseph Power

== Student vote results ==
The Student Vote elections were run by CIVIX and Elections Newfoundland and Labrador, and do not affect the actual elections. 123 schools participated and delivered a result of a majority government for the Progressive Conservatives, with 23 seats, 12 seats for the Liberals, 2 for the NDP, 2 Independent seats and 1 Non-affiliated.

23	12	2	2	1
Progressive Conservative	Liberal	NDP	Independent	Unaffiliated

Student Vote Newfoundland and Labrador 2025 Logo
