= St. George's-Humber =

Provincial electoral district in Newfoundland and Labrador, Canada

Newfoundland and Labrador electoral district

Provincial electoral district
- Legislature: Newfoundland and Labrador House of Assembly
MHA
Hal Cormier
Progressive Conservative
- District created: 2015
- First contested: 2015
- Last contested: 2025

Demographics
- Population (2011): 12,974
- Electors (2015): 9,404
- Area (km²): 6,905
- Census division(s): Division No. 4, Division No. 5
- Census subdivision(s): Division No. 4, Subd. A, Division No. 4, Subd. B, Division No. 4, Subd. C, Division No. 5, Subd. F Gallants, Massey Drive, Pasadena, St. George's, Steady Brook, Stephenville Crossing

St. George's-Humber is a provincial electoral district in Newfoundland and Labrador, Canada, which is represented by one member in the Newfoundland and Labrador House of Assembly. It was contested for the first time in the 2015 provincial election.

The district consists of the communities in Humber Valley from Steady Brook to Pynn's Brook as well as the Town of Massey Drive. It also includes the communities on the south side of St. George's Bay and the communities along the Codroy River.

== Members of the House of Assembly ==
The district has elected the following members of the House of Assembly:

Assembly	Years	Member	Party
48th	2015–2019	Scott Reid	Liberal
49th	2019–2021	Scott Reid	Liberal
50th	2021–2025	Scott Reid	Liberal
51st	2025–present	Hal Cormier	Progressive Conservative

== Election results ==
Graph of election results (minor parties that never got 2% of the vote or did not run consistently are omitted) View source data.

2025 Newfoundland and Labrador general election
Party	Candidate	Votes	%	±%
Progressive Conservative	Hal Cormier	2,648	50.71	+15.05
Liberal	Mark Lamswood	2,366	45.31	-13.23
New Democratic	Jim McKeown	208	3.98	-0.64
Total valid votes		5,222		
Total rejected ballots				
Turnout				
Eligible voters				
Progressive Conservative gain from Liberal		Swing		+14.14

2021 Newfoundland and Labrador general election
Party	Candidate	Votes	%	±%
Liberal	Scott Reid	2,420	58.54	+8.37
Progressive Conservative	Gary Bishop	1,474	35.66	-4.67
New Democratic	Melissa Samms	191	4.62	
NL Alliance	Shane Snook	49	1.19	-8.32
Total valid votes		4,134	99.11	
Total rejected ballots		37	0.89	
Turnout		4,171	43.70	
Eligible voters		9,545		
Liberal hold		Swing		+6.52
Source(s) "Officially Nominated Candidates General Election 2021" (PDF). Elections Newfoundland and Labrador. "NL Election 2021 (Unofficial Results)".

2019 Newfoundland and Labrador general election
Party	Candidate	Votes	%	±%
Liberal	Scott Reid	2,691	50.17	-27.33
Progressive Conservative	Tom O'Brien	2,163	40.32	+25.13
NL Alliance	Shane Snook	510	9.51	+2.20
Total valid votes		5,364	99.26	
Total rejected ballots		40	0.74	+0.21
Turnout		5,404	60.23	+10.34
Eligible voters		8,972		
Liberal hold		Swing		-26.23

2015 Newfoundland and Labrador general election
Party	Candidate	Votes	%
Liberal	Scott Reid	3,617	77.50
Progressive Conservative	Greg Osmond	709	15.19
New Democratic	Shane Snook	341	7.31
Total valid votes		4,667	99.47
Total rejected ballots		25	0.53
Turnout		4,692	49.89
Eligible voters		9,404	
Source: Elections Newfoundland and Labrador

== See also ==
- List of Newfoundland and Labrador provincial electoral districts
- Canadian provincial electoral districts
