= Ernie McLean =

Ernie McLean may refer to:

- Ernest McLean, American rhythm and blues and jazz guitarist
- Ernie McLean (politician), member of the Newfoundland and Labrador House of Assembly
