= Keith Russell (politician) =

Canadian politician

The Honourable Keith Russell ECNL MHA
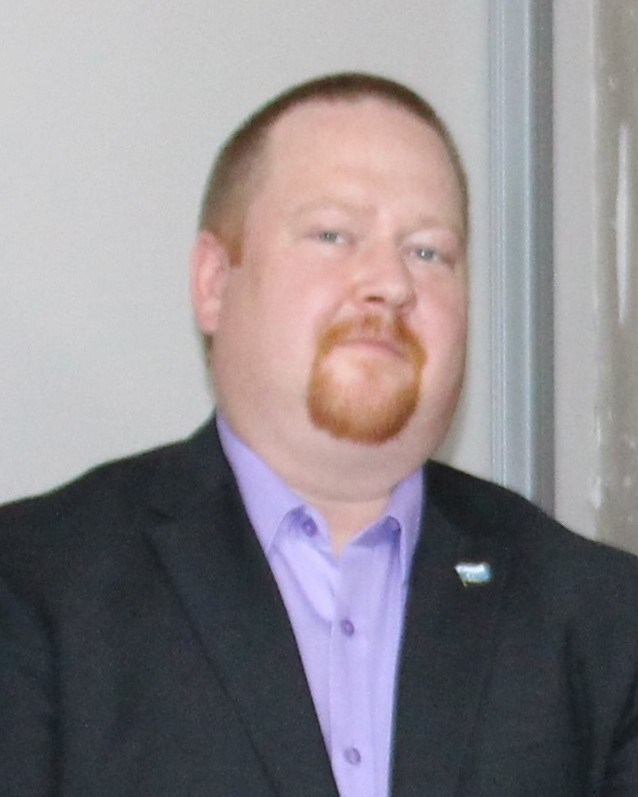
- Russell in 2014

Member of the Newfoundland and Labrador House of Assembly for Lake Melville
- Incumbent
- Assumed office October 14, 2025
- Preceded by: Perry Trimper
- In office October 27, 2011 – November 27, 2015
- Preceded by: John Hickey
- Succeeded by: Perry Trimper

Minister of Labrador and Aboriginal Affairs
- In office September 30, 2014 – December 14, 2015
- Premier: Paul Davis
- Preceded by: Office established
- Succeeded by: Dwight Ball

Personal details
- Born: May 24, 1975 (age 51) Happy Valley-Goose Bay, Newfoundland, Canada
- Party: Independent (2026–); Progressive Conservative (2011–2026)
- Spouse: Brenda Russell

Keith Norman Russell is a Canadian politician in Newfoundland and Labrador and former Minister of Labrador and Aboriginal Affairs. He was elected to the Newfoundland and Labrador House of Assembly in the 2011 provincial election. A member of the Progressive Conservative Party of Newfoundland and Labrador, he represented the Labrador district of Lake Melville until his 2015 election defeat. 10 years later, he was re-elected to a second term in the 2025 Newfoundland and Labrador general election.

Before entering provincial politics Russell was an Ordinary Member for Upper Lake Melville in the Nunatsiavut Government. In 2025, Russell was acclaimed as the nominee for the district of Lake Melville by the Progressive Conservative Party of Newfoundland and Labrador Russell was re-elected in the 2025 Newfoundland and Labrador general election.

On September 14, 2026, Russell announced that he was leaving the PC caucus to sit as an independent MHA. On September 17, 2026, Russell voted against the Churchill Falls Definitive Cooperation and Implementation Agreement (DCIA) in the House of Assembly along with the Liberal and NDP caucuses.

== Electoral record ==
2025 Newfoundland and Labrador general election: Lake Melville
Party	Candidate	Votes	%	±%
Progressive Conservative	Keith Russell	1,718	55.42	+31.55
Liberal	Shaun Maclean	1,280	41.29	+27.94
New Democratic	Jamie Ruby	102	3.29	-8.88
Total valid votes		3,100		
Total rejected ballots				
Turnout				
Eligible voters				
Progressive Conservative gain from Independent		Swing		+40.71

2015 Newfoundland and Labrador general election
Party	Candidate	Votes	%	±%
Liberal	Perry Trimper	1,840	62.0%	
Progressive Conservative	Keith Russell	850	28.6%	
NDP	Arlene Michelin-Pittman	280	9.4%	

2011 Newfoundland and Labrador general election
Party	Candidate	Votes	%	±%
Progressive Conservative	Keith Russell	1,740	49.99%	–
NDP	Arlene Michelin-Pittman	1,211	34.79%	
Liberal	Chris Montague	530	15.23%	
