= Massey Drive =

- Town
- Location of Massey Drive in Newfoundland
- Coordinates: 48°56′14″N 57°54′0″W
- Country: Canada
- Province: Newfoundland and Labrador
- Incorporated: 1971

Government
  - Mayor: Don Brown
  - MHA: Hal Cormier
  - MP: Carol Anstey

Population (2021)
  - Total: 1,606
- Time zone: UTC-3:30 (Newfoundland Time)
  - Summer (DST): UTC-2:30 (Newfoundland Daylight)
- Area code: 709
- Highways: Route 1 (TCH)
- Website: www.masseydrive.com

Massey Drive (2021 pop.: 1,606) is a town located close to the west coast of the island of Newfoundland in the province of Newfoundland and Labrador, Canada. Its name is derived from the original road through the town, named Massey Drive, which in turn is named after Vincent Massey, former Governor General of Canada (1952–59). It is an enclave surrounded by the municipality of Corner Brook, from which it seceded in 1971. It is primarily a residential area.

== Demographics ==
Historical populations
Year	Pop.	±%
1996	736	—
2001	770	+4.6%
2006	1,170	+51.9%
2011	1,412	+20.7%
2016	1,632	+15.6%
2021	1,606	−1.6%

In the 2021 Census of Population conducted by Statistics Canada, Massey Drive had a population of 1,606 living in 626 of its 670 total private dwellings, a change of −1.6% from its 2016 population of 1,632. With a land area of 2.45 km^{2} (0.95 sq mi), it had a population density of 655.5/km^{2} (1,697.8/sq mi) in 2021.
