= Lake Melville (electoral district) =

Provincial electoral district in Newfoundland and Labrador, Canada

Newfoundland and Labrador electoral district
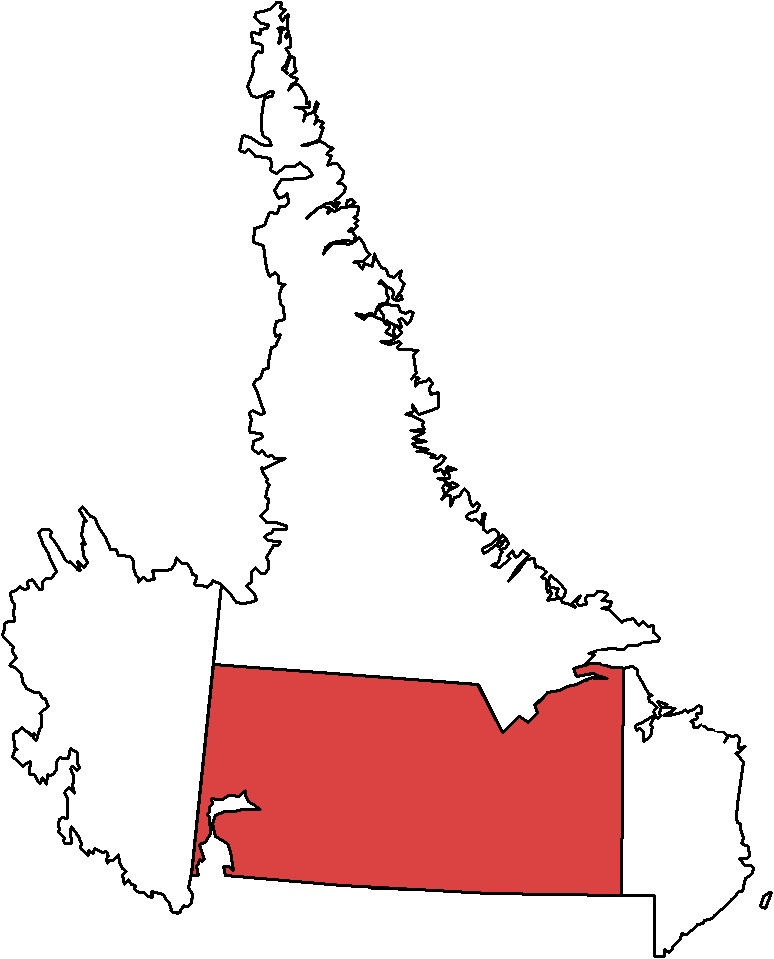
- Lake Melville in relation to other districts in Labrador

Provincial electoral district
- Legislature: Newfoundland and Labrador House of Assembly
MHA
Keith Russell
Independent
- District created: 1975
- First contested: 1975
- Last contested: 2025

Demographics
- Population (2006): 10,299
- Electors (2011): 6,647

Lake Melville is a provincial electoral district for the House of Assembly of Newfoundland and Labrador, Canada. In 2011, there were 6,647 eligible voters living within the district.

The district includes Happy Valley-Goose Bay, Churchill Falls, North West River, Sheshatshiu, and Mud Lake. Happy Valley-Goose Bay is a service and defence town. Aboriginal issues, defence spending, hydroelectric power and control over development of forest resources are the major issues of the district.

Sheshatshiu, a federal Innu reserve, is located approximately 30 kilometres north of Goose Bay.

== Members of the House of Assembly ==
The district has elected the following members of the House of Assembly:

Assembly	Years	Member	Party
Labrador
29th	1949–1951	Harold Horwood	Liberal
30th	1951–1956	Frederick William Rowe	Liberal
Labrador North
31st	1956–1959	Earl W. Winsor	Liberal
32nd	1959–1962	Earl W. Winsor	Liberal
33rd	1962–1966	Earl W. Winsor	Liberal
34th	1966–1971	Earl W. Winsor	Liberal
35th	1972	Melvin Woodward	Liberal
36th	1972–1975	Melvin Woodward	Liberal
Naskaupi
37th	1975–1979	Joseph Goudie	Progressive Conservative
38th	1979–1982	Joseph Goudie	Progressive Conservative
39th	1982–1985	Joseph Goudie	Progressive Conservative
40th	1985–1989	Jim Kelland	Liberal
41st	1989–1992	Jim Kelland	Liberal
41st	1992–1993	Ed Roberts	Liberal
42nd	1993–1996	Ed Roberts	Liberal
Lake Melville
43rd	1996–1999	Ernie McLean	Liberal
44th	1999–2003	Ernie McLean	Liberal
45th	2003–2007	John Hickey	Progressive Conservative
46th	2007–2011	John Hickey	Progressive Conservative
47th	2011–2015	Keith Russell	Progressive Conservative
48th	2015–2019	Perry Trimper	Liberal
49th	2019–2020	Perry Trimper	Liberal
49th	2020–2021	Perry Trimper	Independent
50th	2021–2022	Perry Trimper	Independent
50th	2022–2025	Perry Trimper	Liberal
51st	2025–2026	Keith Russell	Progressive Conservative
51st	2026–present	Keith Russell	Independent

== Election results ==
Graph of election results (minor parties that never got 2% of the vote or did not run consistently are omitted) View source data.

2025 Newfoundland and Labrador general election
Party	Candidate	Votes	%	±%
Progressive Conservative	Keith Russell	1,718	55.42	+31.55
Liberal	Shaun Maclean	1,280	41.29	+27.94
New Democratic	Jamie Ruby	102	3.29	-8.88
Total valid votes		3,100		
Total rejected ballots				
Turnout				
Eligible voters				
Progressive Conservative gain from Independent		Swing		+40.71

2021 Newfoundland and Labrador general election
Party	Candidate	Votes	%	±%
Independent	Perry Trimper	1,143	49.87	
Progressive Conservative	Shannon John Tobin	547	23.87	-12.07
Liberal	Michelle Baikie	306	13.35	-32.49
New Democratic	Amy Norman	279	12.17	
Independent	Andrew T. Abbass	17	0.74	
Total valid votes		2,292	99.13	
Total rejected ballots		20	0.87	
Turnout		2,312	36.39	
Eligible voters		6,353		
Independent gain from Liberal		Swing		+41.18
Source(s) "Officially Nominated Candidates General Election 2021" (PDF). Elections Newfoundland and Labrador. "NL Election 2021 (Unofficial Results)".

2019 Newfoundland and Labrador general election
Party	Candidate	Votes	%	±%
Liberal	Perry Trimper	1,517	45.8	
Progressive Conservative	Shannon John Tobin	1,189	35.9	
Independent	Jim Learning	603	18.2	
Total valid votes				
Total rejected ballots				
Turnout				
Eligible voters				

2015 Newfoundland and Labrador general election
Party	Candidate	Votes	%	±%
Liberal	Perry Trimper	1,840	62.0%	+46.77
Progressive Conservative	Keith Russell	850	28.6%	-21.39
New Democratic	Arlene Michelin-Pittman	280	9.4%	-25.39
Total valid votes		2,970	100.0	

2011 Newfoundland and Labrador general election
Party	Candidate	Votes	%	±%
Progressive Conservative	Keith Russell	1,740	49.99%	-6.69
New Democratic	Arlene Michelin-Pittman	1,211	34.79%	+31.29
Liberal	Chris Montague	530	15.23%	-24.59
Total valid votes		3,481	100.0	

2007 Newfoundland and Labrador general election
Party	Candidate	Votes	%	±%
Progressive Conservative	John Hickey	2,380	56.68%	–
Liberal	Chris Montague	1,672	39.82%	
NDP	Bill Cooper	147	3.5%	

2003 Newfoundland and Labrador general election
Party	Candidate	Votes	%	±%
Progressive Conservative	John Hickey	1,776	39.27%	–
Labrador Party	Brandon Pardy	1,486	32.85%	
Liberal	Ken Anthony	1,126	24.89%	
NDP	Barbara Stickley	135	2.98%	

1999 Newfoundland and Labrador general election
Party	Candidate	Votes	%	±%
Liberal	Ernie McLean	1,915	52.3%	
Progressive Conservative	Hayward Broomfield	1,413	38.6%	–
NDP	Ronald W. Peddle	323	8.8%	

== See also ==
- List of Newfoundland and Labrador provincial electoral districts
- Canadian provincial electoral districts
