= John Hickey (Canadian politician) =

Canadian politician

The Honourable John Hickey ECNL

Minister of Labrador Affairs of Newfoundland and Labrador
- In office July 5, 2006 – September 19, 2011
- Preceded by: Trevor Taylor
- Succeeded by: Nick McGrath

Member of the Newfoundland and Labrador House of Assembly for Lake Melville
- In office 2003 – September 19, 2011
- Preceded by: Ernie McLean
- Succeeded by: Keith Russell

Minister of Transportation and Works of Newfoundland and Labrador
- In office July 5, 2006 – October 30, 2007
- Preceded by: Trevor Taylor
- Succeeded by: Dianne Whalen

Mayor of Happy Valley-Goose Bay
- In office October 2, 2017 – December 14, 2017
- Preceded by: Jamie Snook
- Succeeded by: Wally Andersen

Personal details
- Born: c. 1955
- Died: December 14, 2017 (aged 62) St. John's, Newfoundland and Labrador
- Party: Progressive Conservative

John Hickey (c. 1955 – December 14, 2017) was a politician in Newfoundland and Labrador, Canada. He represented the district of Lake Melville in the Newfoundland and Labrador House of Assembly from 2003 to 2011. He was a member of the Progressive Conservative Party and served in the Cabinets of Danny Williams and Kathy Dunderdale.

On July 5, 2006, Hickey was appointed to the Executive Council of Newfoundland and Labrador as Minister of Transportation and Works and Minister of Labrador Affairs. Following the 2007 election, Hickey remained in cabinet as Minister of Labrador Affairs, but lost the transportation portfolio.

On June 22, 2011, Hickey confirmed that he would not seek re-election in the October 2011 provincial election.

Prior to entering provincial politics, Hickey was a municipal councillor in Happy Valley-Goose Bay for 15 years, and served as mayor in 2003.

In 2013, Hickey ran for mayor of Happy Valley-Goose Bay, but was defeated. He ran again in the 2017 municipal election, and was elected mayor by more than 800 votes.

On December 9, 2017, Hickey was seriously injured when he accidentally shot himself in the face in a hunting accident. He died on December 14, aged 62.

== Electoral results ==
2007 Newfoundland and Labrador general election
Party	Candidate	Votes	%	±%
Progressive Conservative	John Hickey	2380	56.68%	–
Liberal	Chris Montague	1672	39.82%	
NDP	Bill Cooper	147	3.5%	

2003 Newfoundland and Labrador general election
Party	Candidate	Votes	%	±%
Progressive Conservative	John Hickey	1776	39.27%	–
Labrador Party	Brandon Pardy	1486	32.85%	
Liberal	Ken Anthony	1126	24.89%	
NDP	Barbara Stickley	135	2.98%	
