= Elvis Loveless =

Canadian politician

The Honourable Elvis Loveless ECNL MHA
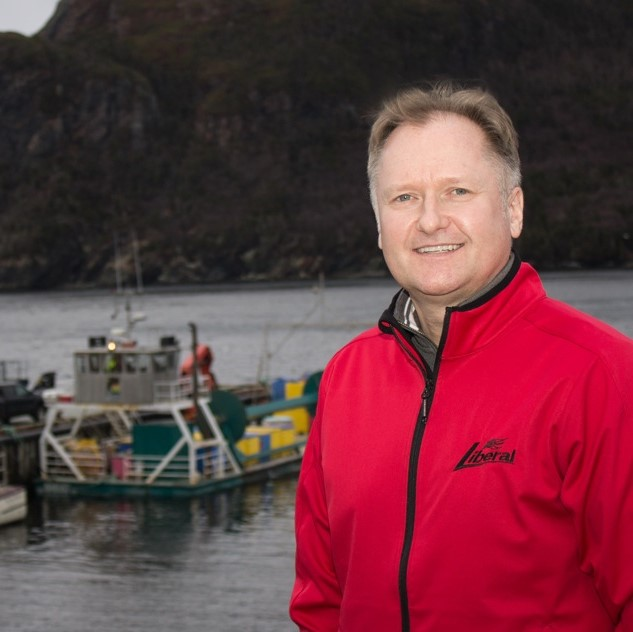
- Loveless in 2019

Minister of Digital Government and Service Newfoundland and Labrador
- In office July 19, 2024 – May 9, 2025
- Preceded by: Sarah Stoodley
- Succeeded by: Sarah Stoodley

Minister of Fisheries, Forestry and Agriculture in Newfoundland and Labrador
- In office June 14, 2023 – July 19, 2024
- Preceded by: Derrick Bragg
- Succeeded by: Gerry Byrne

Minister of Transportation and Infrastructure
- In office April 8, 2021 – October 14, 2025
- Preceded by: Derrick Bragg
- Succeeded by: Barry Petten

Minister of Fisheries, Forestry and Agriculture
- In office August 19, 2020 – April 8, 2021
- Preceded by: Gerry Byrne
- Succeeded by: Derrick Bragg

Member of the Newfoundland and Labrador House of Assembly for Fortune Bay-Cape La Hune
- Incumbent
- Assumed office May 16, 2019
- Preceded by: Tracey Perry

Personal details
- Party: Liberal

Elvis Loveless is a Canadian politician, who was elected as a Liberal to the Newfoundland and Labrador House of Assembly in the 2019 provincial election. He represents the electoral district of Fortune Bay-Cape La Hune in Central Newfoundland.

== Politics ==
Before being elected, Loveless worked for then-MHA Oliver Langdon. He had previously contested the district in the 2007 provincial election losing to PC candidate Tracey Perry.

Loveless was elected to the House of Assembly in the 2019 election and was one of only two Liberals (alongside Sarah Stoodley) elected for the first time.

On August 19, 2020, Loveless was appointed Minister of Fisheries, Forestry, and Agriculture in the Furey government.

Loveless was re-elected in the 2021 provincial election. He was appointed Minister of Transportation and Infrastructure. On June 14, 2023, Loveless was again appointed Minister of Fisheries, Forestry, and Agriculture. On July 19, 2024, he was appointed as Minister of Digital Government and Service Newfoundland and Labrador and Minister Responsible for the Office of the Chief Information Officer.

In the 2025 Liberal Party of Newfoundland and Labrador leadership election, Loveless endorsed John Hogan. On May 9, 2025, he was appointed Minister of Transportation and Infrastructure.

Loveless was re-elected in the 2025 Newfoundland and Labrador general election.

On May 21, 2026, Loveless was entangled in a shouting match with Government House Leader Lloyd Parrott in the House of Assembly, with spillovers outside the House. On May 25, Speaker Paul Lane deemed both Loveless's and Parrott's behavior "unacceptable"; both members were made to withdraw from the House.

== Electoral record ==
2025 Newfoundland and Labrador general election: Fortune Bay-Cape La Hune
Party	Candidate	Votes	%	±%
Liberal	Elvis Loveless	1,842	65.95	-2.27
Progressive Conservative	Ada John	903	32.33	+3.81
New Democratic	Eamon Carew	48	1.72	-1.53
Total valid votes		2,793		
Total rejected ballots				
Turnout				
Eligible voters				
Liberal hold		Swing		-3.04

2021 Newfoundland and Labrador general election: Fortune Bay-Cape La Hune
Party	Candidate	Votes	%	±%
Liberal	Elvis Loveless	1,868	68.22	+14.84
Progressive Conservative	Charlene Walsh	781	28.52	-18.09
New Democratic	Noel Joe	89	3.25	
Total valid votes		2,738	99.71	
Total rejected ballots		8	0.29	
Turnout		2,746	50.99	
Eligible voters		5,385		
Liberal hold		Swing		+16.47
Source(s) "Officially Nominated Candidates General Election 2021" (PDF). Elections Newfoundland and Labrador. "NL Election 2021 (Unofficial Results)".

2019 Newfoundland and Labrador general election
Party	Candidate	Votes	%	±%
Liberal	Elvis Loveless	1,759	53.41	+15.8
Progressive Conservative	Charlene Walsh	1,536	46.6	-2.4
Total valid votes		3,295	100	
Total rejected ballots		17		
Turnout		3,312	62.0	-5.6
Eligible voters		5,342		
Source(s) "2019 Provincial General Election Report" (PDF). Elections Newfoundland and Labrador. February 7, 2020. p. 135.

2007 Newfoundland and Labrador general election
Party	Candidate	Votes	%	±%
Progressive Conservative	Tracey Perry	2,539	63.19%	–
Liberal	Elvis Loveless	1,395	34.72%	
NDP	Sheldon Hynes	84	2.09%	
