= Hal Cormier =

Canadian politician

Hal Cormier MHA

Member of the House of Assembly for St. George's-Humber
- Incumbent
- Assumed office November 3, 2025
- Preceded by: Scott Reid

Personal details
- Party: Progressive Conservative
- Website: www.halcormier.com

Hal Cormier is a Canadian politician from the Progressive Conservative Party of Newfoundland and Labrador. In the 2025 Newfoundland and Labrador general election he was elected to the Newfoundland and Labrador House of Assembly in St. George's-Humber.

On September 17, 2026, Cormier voted to approve the Churchill Falls Definitive Cooperation and Implementation Agreement (DCIA) in the House of Assembly along with the PC caucus.

Cormier was a member of the Town of Pasadena Council.

== Election results ==
2025 Newfoundland and Labrador general election: St. George's-Humber
Party	Candidate	Votes	%	±%
Progressive Conservative	Hal Cormier	2,648	50.71	+15.05
Liberal	Mark Lamswood	2,366	45.31	-13.23
New Democratic	Jim McKeown	208	3.98	-0.64
Total valid votes		5,222		
Total rejected ballots				
Turnout				
Eligible voters				
Progressive Conservative gain from Liberal		Swing		+14.14
