= 2024 Yukon municipal elections =

- October 17, 2024

Municipal elections in Yukon were held on October 17, 2024. Voters in the Canadian territory of Yukon elected mayors, councillors, and all other elected officials in all of the territory's municipalities. Municipal elections in Yukon are non-partisan.

== Background ==
The previous elections were held in October 2021. Special and advanced polls opened October 10 and closed on election day. School board elections were held in November 2025.

== Elections ==
The following communities elected their mayors and city councils:

- Whitehorse - City councillor Kirk Cameron elected as mayor
- Watson Lake - Town councillor Lauren Hanchar elected mayor
- Dawson City - Stephen Johnson defeated incumbent mayor Bill Kendrick
- Carmacks - Town councillor Justin Lachance elected as mayor
- Faro - Incumbent mayor Jack Bowers was re-elected
- Mayo - Incumbent mayor Trevor Ellis re-elected by acclamation
- Teslin - Incumbent mayor Gord Curran re-elected by acclamation
- Haines Junction - Michael Riseborough elected as mayor

== Whitehorse ==
Incumbent mayor Laura Cabott announced in May 2024 that she would not run for re-election.

A slate known as "Together Whitehorse" was formed, with priorities including community safety, fiscal responsibility and collaboration with territorial and First Nations governments. Tattoo artist Dan Bushnell was their mayor candidate.

Other candidates for mayor included city councillor Kirk Cameron, janitor Dino Rudniski, businessman (and father of city councillor Melissa Murray) Stephen Kwok, and homelessness advocate Jack Bogaard.

Mayoral Candidate	Vote	%
Kirk Cameron	3,116	52.20
Dan Bushnell	2,206	36.96
Stephen Kwok	381	6.38
Jack Bogaard	195	3.27
Dino Rudniski	71	1.19
