= Fogo Island-Cape Freels =

Provincial electoral district in Newfoundland and Labrador, Canada

Newfoundland and Labrador electoral district

Provincial electoral district
- Legislature: Newfoundland and Labrador House of Assembly
MHA
Jim McKenna
Progressive Conservative
- District created: 2015
- First contested: 2015
- Last contested: 2025

Demographics
- Population (2011): 14,035
- Electors (2015): 10,450
- Area (km²): 4,040
- Census division(s): Division No. 6, Division No. 7, Division No. 8
- Census subdivision(s): Carmanville, Centreville-Wareham-Trinity, Change Islands, Division No. 6, Subd. E, Division No. 7, Subd. A, Division No. 7, Subd. B, Division No. 7, Subd. N, Division No. 8, Subd. G, Division No. 8, Subd. L, Division No. 8, Subd. M, Dover, Fogo Island, Greenspond, Hare Bay, Indian Bay, Lumsden, Musgrave Harbour, New-Wes-Valley

Fogo Island-Cape Freels is a provincial electoral district in Newfoundland and Labrador, Canada, which is represented by one member in the Newfoundland and Labrador House of Assembly. It was contested for the first time in the 2015 provincial election. It was created out of all of Bonavista North, and parts of The Isles of Notre Dame, Lewisporte and Terra Nova.

The riding contains Fogo Island, the Change Islands, the communities along the Straight Shore including the Dog Bay area and Gander Bay, and the communities on the north shore of Bonavista Bay from Cape Freels to Hare Bay.

== Members of the House of Assembly ==
The district has elected the following members of the House of Assembly:

Assembly	Years	Member	Party
48th	2015–2019	Derrick Bragg	Liberal
49th	2019–2021	Derrick Bragg	Liberal
50th	2021–2024	Derrick Bragg	Liberal
50th	2024–2025	Jim McKenna	Progressive Conservative
51st	2025–present	Jim McKenna	Progressive Conservative

== Election results ==
Graph of election results (minor parties that never got 2% of the vote or did not run consistently are omitted) View source data.

2025 Newfoundland and Labrador general election
Party	Candidate	Votes	%	±%
Progressive Conservative	Jim McKenna	2,602	51.80	-5.89
Liberal	Dale Lewis	2,208	43.96	+4.61
Independent	Garry Leyte	144	2.87	
New Democratic	Albert Murphy	69	1.37	-1.59
Total valid votes		5,023		
Total rejected ballots				
Turnout				
Eligible voters				
Progressive Conservative hold		Swing		-5.25

Newfoundland and Labrador provincial by-election, April 15, 2024 Death of Derrick Bragg
Party	Candidate	Votes	%	±%
Progressive Conservative	Jim McKenna	3,290	57.69	+21.05
Liberal	Dana Blackmore	2,244	39.35	-21.70
New Democratic	Jim Gill	169	2.96	+0.65
Total valid votes		5,703	99.58	
Total rejected ballots		24	0.42	+0.06
Turnout		5,727	55.91	+15.16
Eligible voters		10,244		
Progressive Conservative gain from Liberal		Swing		+21.38

2021 Newfoundland and Labrador general election
Party	Candidate	Votes	%	±%
Liberal	Derrick Bragg	2,511	61.05	+6.74
Progressive Conservative	Sue Collins	1,507	36.64	-9.05
New Democratic	Jim Gill	95	2.31	
Total valid votes		4,113	99.64	
Total rejected ballots		15	0.36	-0.21
Turnout		4,128	40.74	-11.35
Eligible voters		10,132		
Liberal hold		Swing		+7.90
Source(s) "Officially Nominated Candidates General Election 2021" (PDF). Elections Newfoundland and Labrador. "2021 Provincial General Election Report" (PDF).

2019 Newfoundland and Labrador general election
Party	Candidate	Votes	%	±%
Liberal	Derrick Bragg	2,811	54.31	-15.58
Progressive Conservative	Sue Collins	2,365	45.69	+18.12
Total valid votes		5,176	99.42	
Total rejected ballots		30	0.58	+0.32
Turnout		5,206	52.10	+3.83
Eligible voters		9,993		
Liberal hold		Swing		-16.85

2015 Newfoundland and Labrador general election
Party	Candidate	Votes	%
Liberal	Derrick Bragg	3,516	69.89
Progressive Conservative	Eli Cross	1,387	27.57
New Democratic	Rebecca Stuckey	128	2.54
Total valid votes		5,031	99.74
Total rejected ballots		13	0.26
Turnout		5,044	48.27
Eligible voters		10,450	
Source: Elections Newfoundland and Labrador

== See also ==
- List of Newfoundland and Labrador provincial electoral districts
- Canadian provincial electoral districts
