= Jim McKenna (politician) =

Canadian politician

Jim McKenna MHA
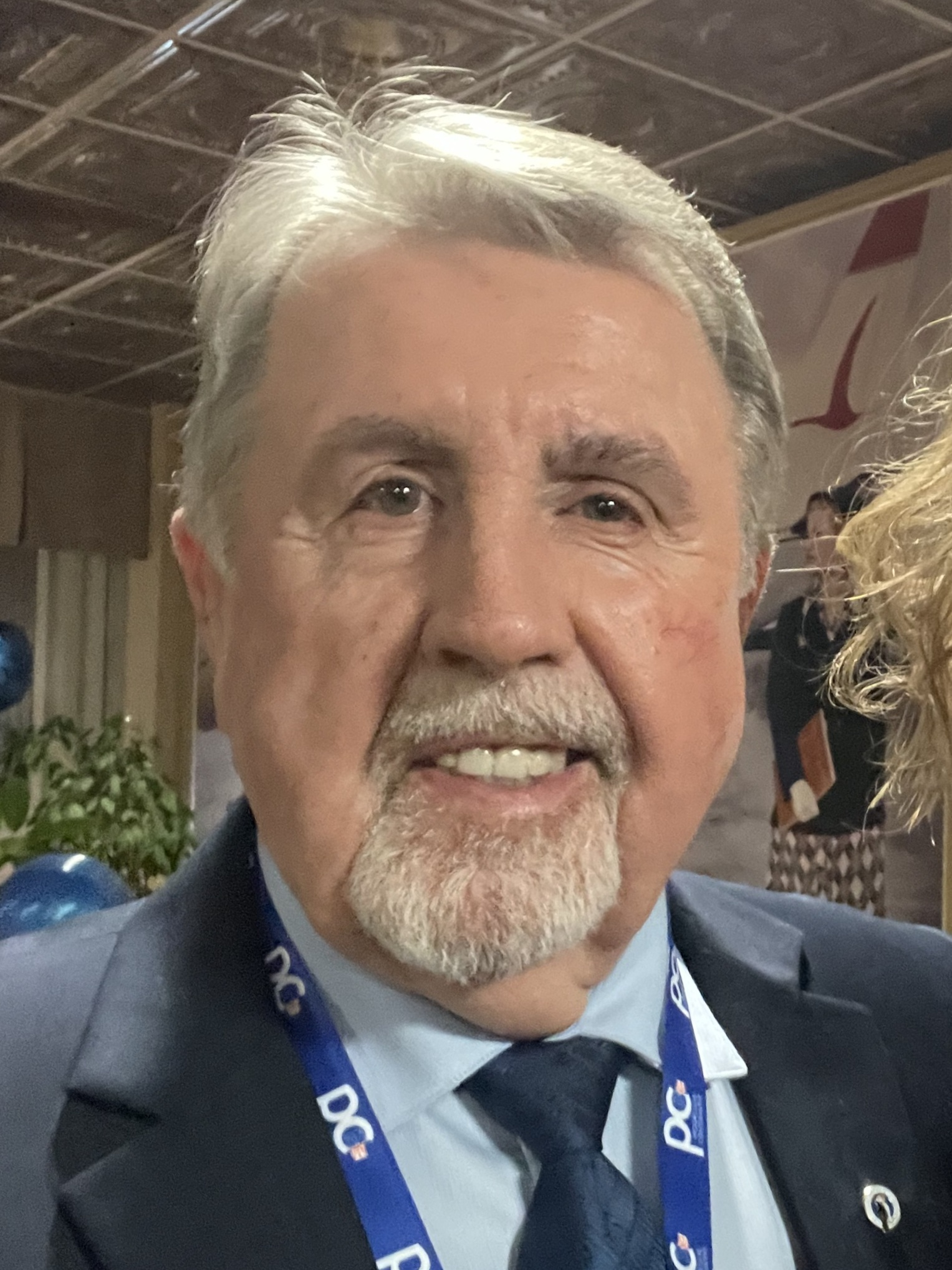
- McKenna in 2026

Member of the Newfoundland and Labrador House of Assembly for Fogo Island-Cape Freels
- Incumbent
- Assumed office April 15, 2024
- Preceded by: Derrick Bragg

Personal details
- Party: Progressive Conservative
- Spouse: Alice McKenna

James "Jim" McKenna is a Canadian politician from Newfoundland and Labrador. He was elected to the Newfoundland and Labrador House of Assembly for the Progressive Conservative Party in the 2024 Fogo Island-Cape Freels provincial by-election.

At the time of his by-election victory, he worked at the Canadian Coast Guard. He is also a former businessman and previously worked in the Alberta oil sands.

McKenna was re-elected in the 2025 Newfoundland and Labrador general election.

On September 17, 2026, McKenna voted to approve the Churchill Falls Definitive Cooperation and Implementation Agreement (DCIA) in the House of Assembly along with the PC caucus.

== Electoral record ==
2025 Newfoundland and Labrador general election: Fogo Island-Cape Freels
Party	Candidate	Votes	%	±%
Progressive Conservative	Jim McKenna	2,602	51.80	-5.89
Liberal	Dale Lewis	2,208	43.96	+4.61
Independent	Garry Leyte	144	2.87	
New Democratic	Albert Murphy	69	1.37	-1.59
Total valid votes		5,023		
Total rejected ballots				
Turnout				
Eligible voters				
Progressive Conservative hold		Swing		-5.25

Newfoundland and Labrador provincial by-election, April 15, 2024 Death of Derrick Bragg
Party	Candidate	Votes	%	±%
Progressive Conservative	Jim McKenna	3,290	57.69	+21.05
Liberal	Dana Blackmore	2,244	39.35	-21.70
New Democratic	Jim Gill	169	2.96	+0.65
Total valid votes		5,703		
Total rejected ballots				
Turnout			55.90	+15.16
Eligible voters		10,241		
Progressive Conservative gain from Liberal		Swing		+21.38

== See also ==
- 50th General Assembly of Newfoundland and Labrador
