= 2024 Fogo Island-Cape Freels provincial by-election =

← 2021	April 15, 2024	2025 →

Riding of Fogo Island-Cape Freels
- Turnout: 55.90%
	First party	Second party
	PC	LIB
Candidate	Jim McKenna	Dana Blackmore
Party	Progressive Conservative	Liberal
Last election	36.64%	61.05%
Popular vote	3,290	2,244
Percentage	57.69%	39.35%
Swing	▲21.05	▼21.70
MHA before election
Derrick Bragg
Liberal
Elected MHA
Jim McKenna
Progressive Conservative

The 2024 Fogo Island-Cape Freels provincial by-election was held on April 15, 2024 following the death of Liberal member of the Newfoundland and Labrador House of Assembly Derrick Bragg.

== Candidates ==
- Progressive Conservative - Jim McKenna was selected on March 13. Nominations had opened on March 11.
- Liberal - Dana Blackmore won the nomination on March 11. Nominations had opened on February 23. She beat Mike Tiller, and Tony Keats.
- New Democratic - Jim Gill was selected on March 15. Nominations had opened on March 8.

== Results ==
Newfoundland and Labrador provincial by-election, April 15, 2024 Death of Derrick Bragg
Party	Candidate	Votes	%	±%
Progressive Conservative	Jim McKenna	3,290	57.69	+21.05
Liberal	Dana Blackmore	2,244	39.35	-21.70
New Democratic	Jim Gill	169	2.96	+0.65
Total valid votes		5,703		
Total rejected ballots				
Turnout			55.90	+15.16
Eligible voters		10,241		
Progressive Conservative gain from Liberal		Swing		+21.38

== 2021 results ==
2021 Newfoundland and Labrador general election: Fogo Island-Cape Freels
Party	Candidate	Votes	%	±%
Liberal	Derrick Bragg	2,511	61.05	+6.74
Progressive Conservative	Sue Collins	1,507	36.64	-9.05
New Democratic	Jim Gill	95	2.31	
Total valid votes		4,113	99.64	
Total rejected ballots		15	0.36	-0.21
Turnout		4,128	40.74	-11.35
Eligible voters		10,132		
Liberal hold		Swing		+7.90
Source(s) "Officially Nominated Candidates General Election 2021" (PDF). Elections Newfoundland and Labrador. "2021 Provincial General Election Report" (PDF).

== Results by Community ==
Poll Numbers	Community	McKenna	Blackmore	Gill	Vote Total
1	Cape Freels North	13	42	0	55
2-3	Centreville	105	79	5	189
4-5	Dover	96	55	8	159
6-8	Hare Bay	222	154	11	387
9	Trinity	51	60	2	113
10	Wareham	73	58	5	136
11	Indian Bay	56	24	0	80
12	Greenspond	75	66	5	146
13	Valleyfield	47	105	2	154
14	Pool's Island	25	33	2	60
15-16	Badger's Quay	72	100	3	175
17	Brookfield	22	33	2	57
18-19	Wesleyville	53	69	1	123
20	Pound Cove and Templeman	22	64	1	87
21	Newtown	44	73	4	121
22	Lumsden	88	134	6	228
23	Deadman's Bay	25	17	4	46
24-26	Musgrave Harbour	267	75	19	361
27	Aspen Cove	33	36	1	70
28	Ladle Cove	21	15	2	38
29-30	Carmanville	125	42	10	177
31	Noggin Cove	71	16	6	93
32	Frederickton	73	11	2	86
33	Davidsville and Main Point	61	29	3	93
34	George's Point and Harris Point	101	45	10	156
35	Clarke's Head and Wings Point	99	57	7	163
36	Victoria Cove and Rodgers Cove	67	33	2	102
37	Horwood	59	22	4	85
38	Stoneville	82	29	1	112
39	Port Albert	12	11	1	24
40	Change Islands	26	20	0	46
41	Stag Harbour	48	7	1	56
42	Seldom-Little Seldom	55	33	3	91
43	Shoal Bay, Fogo Island Centre, and Barr'd Islands	29	14	1	44
44-45	Joe Batt's Arm	100	61	6	167
46	Tilting	62	17	2	81
47-48	Fogo	129	59	5	193
49	Deep Bay	20	4	0	24
50	Island Harbour	44	6	0	50
Advance		462	272	16	750
Special Ballots		155	164	6	325
TOTAL		3,290	2,244	169	5,703

== See also ==
- List of Newfoundland and Labrador by-elections
