= Ernie McLean (politician) =

Canadian politician

The Honourable Ernie McLean ECNL

Minister of Development and Rural Renewal, And Minister of Education
- In office October 17, 2000 – February 13, 2001
- Preceded by: John Efford
- Succeeded by: Office Abolished

Member of the Newfoundland and Labrador House of Assembly for Lake Melville
- In office 1996–2003
- Preceded by: Ed Roberts
- Succeeded by: John Hickey

Personal details
- Born: North West River, Labrador
- Party: Liberal Party of Newfoundland and Labrador

Ernest McLean is a former Canadian politician in the province of Newfoundland and Labrador. He represented the electoral district of Lake Melville in the Newfoundland and Labrador House of Assembly from 1996 to 2003, as a member of the Liberal Party of Newfoundland and Labrador. He served as Minister of Government Services and Lands, and Minister Responsible for Labrador in the cabinet of Brian Tobin and as Minister of Development and Rural Renewal in the cabinet of Premier Roger Grimes.

McLean was born in North West River, Labrador and attended Yale High School graduating in 1963. Before entering politics, he worked for the Grenfell Regional Health Services and Department of Municipal and Provincial Affairs. McLean also served as mayor of his hometown, North West River. Following his retirement from provincial politics, he served once again as deputy mayor of North West River in 2008. McLean also served in various community positions including as Director of the Labrador North Chamber of Commerce, treasurer and president of the Labrador Heritage Society and on the Labrador Health Board.
