= Scott Reid (Newfoundland and Labrador politician) =

Canadian politician

The Honourable Doctor Scott Reid ECNL

Minister of Environment and Climate Change
- In office May 9, 2025 – October 29, 2025
- Premier: John Hogan
- Preceded by: Lisa Dempster

Minister Responsible for Indigenous Affairs and Reconciliation
- In office July 19, 2024 – October 29, 2025
- Premier: Andrew Furey; John Hogan
- Preceded by: Lisa Dempster
- Succeeded by: Lela Evans

Speaker of the Newfoundland and Labrador House of Assembly
- In office September 6, 2019 – April 12, 2021
- Preceded by: Perry Trimper
- Succeeded by: Derek Bennett

Member of the Newfoundland and Labrador House of Assembly for St. George's-Humber St. George's-Stephenville East (2014-2015)
- In office September 11, 2014 – October 14, 2025
- Preceded by: Joan Shea
- Succeeded by: Hal Cormier

Personal details
- Party: Liberal
- Occupation: professor

Scott Reid is a Canadian politician. He was elected to represent the district of St. George's-Stephenville East in the Newfoundland and Labrador House of Assembly in a 2014 by-election; in the 2015 election, he was re-elected in the new district of St. George's-Humber. He is a member of the Liberal Party.

== Background ==
Reid was raised in the community of Jeffrey's. Reid has taught at the Department of Political Science and the Faculty of Business at Memorial University. Reid previously worked as a researcher under the leadership of Roger Grimes, Gerry Reid, Yvonne Jones, and Dwight Ball. From 2008 to 2010, he was a senior policy advisor to Liberal MP Siobhan Coady.

== Politics ==
Reid was re-elected in the 2019 provincial election. On September 6, 2019, he was appointed acting Speaker of the House of Assembly following Perry Trimper re-entering cabinet. Reid was elected Speaker at the beginning of the fall 2019 session of the House of Assembly defeating Trimper.

Reid was re-elected in the 2021 provincial election. He ran for re-election as Speaker at the beginning of the 50th General Assembly but was defeated by Derek Bennett. He was appointed as Minister Responsible for Indigenous Affairs and Reconciliation on July 19, 2024. On May 9, 2025, he was appointed Minister of Environment and Climate Change.

On July 14, 2025, Reid announced that he would not seek re-election in St. George's-Humber in the 2025 election.

== Election results ==
2021 Newfoundland and Labrador general election: St. George's-Humber
Party	Candidate	Votes	%	±%
Liberal	Scott Reid	2,420	58.54	+8.37
Progressive Conservative	Gary Bishop	1,474	35.66	-4.67
New Democratic	Melissa Samms	191	4.62	
NL Alliance	Shane Snook	49	1.19	-8.32
Total valid votes		4,134	99.11	
Total rejected ballots		37	0.89	
Turnout		4,171	43.70	
Eligible voters		9,545		
Liberal hold		Swing		+6.52
Source(s) "Officially Nominated Candidates General Election 2021" (PDF). Elections Newfoundland and Labrador. "NL Election 2021 (Unofficial Results)".

2019 Newfoundland and Labrador general election
Party	Candidate	Votes	%	±%
Liberal	Scott Reid	2,691	50.17	-27.33
Progressive Conservative	Tom O'Brien	2,163	40.32	+25.13
NL Alliance	Shane Snook	510	9.51	+2.20
Total valid votes		5,364		
Total rejected ballots				
Turnout				
Eligible voters				
Liberal hold		Swing		-26.23

2015 Newfoundland and Labrador general election
Party	Candidate	Votes	%	±%
Liberal	Scott Reid	3,618	77.5	–
Progressive Conservative	Greg Osmond	708	15.2	–
New Democratic	Shane Snook	341	7.3	–

}

By-election August 26, 2014 On the resignation of Joan Shea, June 2, 2014
Party	Candidate	Votes	%	±%
Liberal	Scott Reid	2211	59.15	+26.43
Progressive Conservative	Wally Childs	948	25.36	-23.95
NDP	Bernice Hancock	579	15.49	-1.03
Total valid votes		3,739		
Rejected				
Turnout				
Liberal gain from Progressive Conservative		Swing		+25.19
