= Perry Trimper =

Canadian politician

The Honourable Perry Trimper ECNL
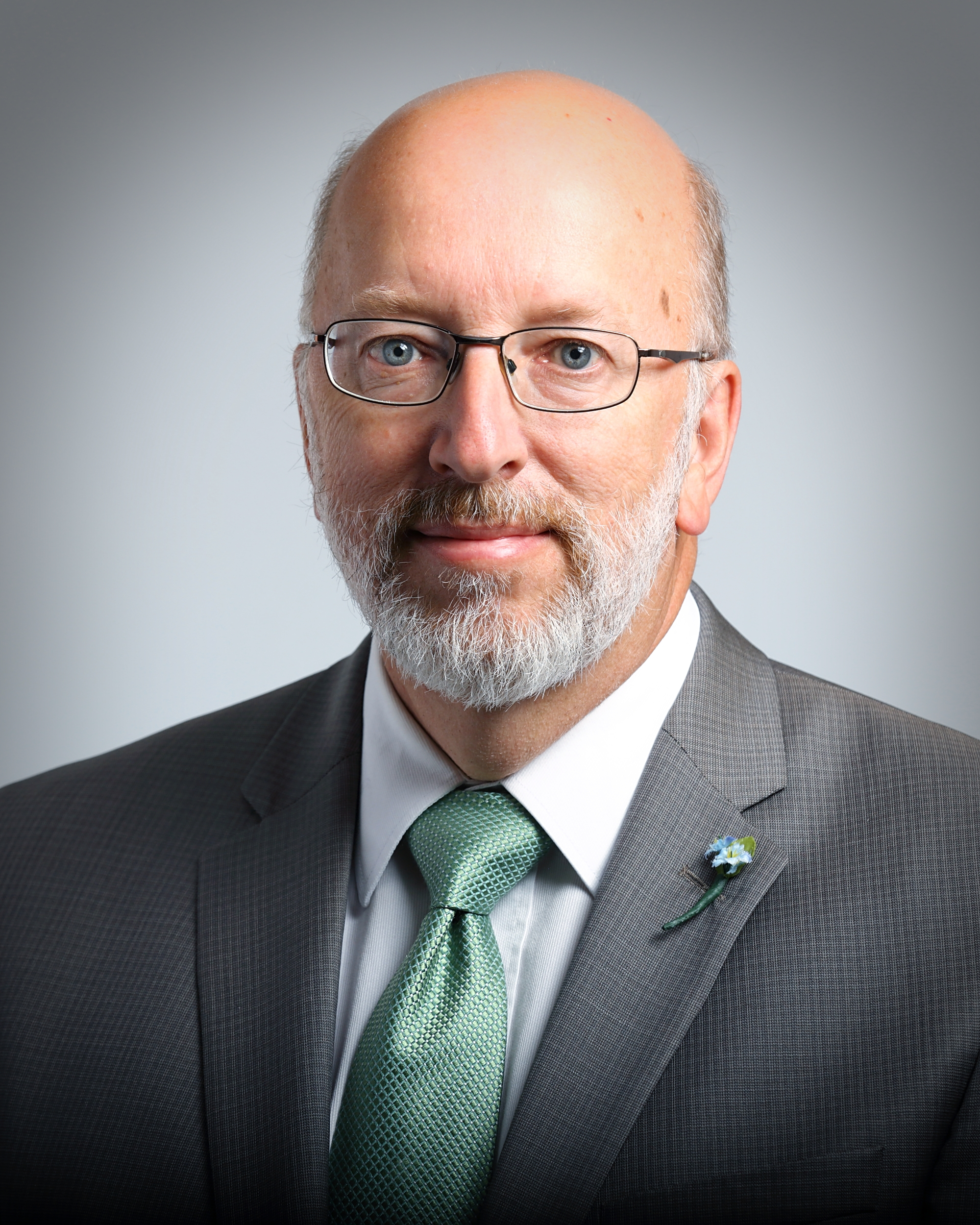

Speaker of the Newfoundland and Labrador House of Assembly
- In office August 8, 2017 – September 6, 2019
- Preceded by: Tom Osborne
- Succeeded by: Scott Reid (acting)

Member of the Newfoundland and Labrador House of Assembly for Lake Melville
- In office November 30, 2015 – October 14, 2025
- Preceded by: Keith Russell
- Succeeded by: Keith Russell

Minister of Environment and Conservation
- In office December 14, 2015 – July 31, 2017
- Preceded by: Dan Crummell
- Succeeded by: Eddie Joyce

Minister of Municipal Affairs and Environment
- In office September 6, 2019 – September 13, 2019
- Preceded by: Graham Letto
- Succeeded by: Derrick Bragg

Minister of Service NL
- In office February 22, 2017 – July 31, 2017
- Preceded by: Eddie Joyce
- Succeeded by: Sherry Gambin-Walsh

Registrar General
- In office September 6, 2019 – September 13, 2019
- Preceded by: Lisa Dempster
- Succeeded by: Derrick Bragg

Personal details
- Party: Liberal (2015–2020, since 2022); Independent (2020–2022)

Perry Trimper is a Canadian politician, who was elected to the Newfoundland and Labrador House of Assembly in the 2015 provincial election, 2019 and 2021 provincial elections. He represented the electoral district of Lake Melville as a Liberal until 2025. Trimper worked for 30 years in northern resource development and wildlife ecology in Canada and Russia. As a principal scientist with Jacques Whitford and later Stantec, he was involved with numerous environmental research and assessment projects in Labrador.

== Politics ==
=== Government caucus (2015–2020) ===
Following the 2015 provincial election, Trimper was appointed to the Executive Council of Newfoundland and Labrador as minister of environment and conservation. As part of a government structure change in February 2017, Trimper was appointed minister for Service NL while retaining responsibility for Francophone Affairs and Climate Change. Notable legislation enacted during his time as minister included the first provincial bill dealing with climate change (Bill 34) and tougher penalties related to impaired driving (Bill 68). He was dropped from cabinet on July 31, 2017 and proposed by Premier Dwight Ball as a candidate for Speaker of the House of Assembly to replace Tom Osborne. Trimper was elected as the 44th Speaker in a special August 2017 sitting of the Assembly defeating fellow Liberal Pam Parsons. He was the province's first Speaker from a Labrador district.

As an emissary of the House of Assembly, Speaker Trimper travelled with a senior official, Larry Weatherbie, to Turkey in early 2018. Working through diplomatic channels, the delegation was able to secure permission to finally establish a monument to the Royal Newfoundland Regiment at the First World War Battlefield in Gallipoli. Closer to home, Trimper initiated bilateral relations with the Assemblée nationale du Québec. He oversaw the legislature during a harassment scandal between MHAs that led to a new workplace policy and legislative changes.

He was re-elected in the 2019 provincial election whereupon he continued uncontested as the Speaker. Trimper re-entered cabinet on September 6, 2019 as Minister of Municipal Affairs and the Environment. Trimper resigned from cabinet on September 13, 2019 after comments critical of the Innu Nation were left on the voicemail of an Innu Nation staffer and publicly revealed. He attempted to regain his position of Speaker of the Assembly following the convening of the fall 2019 session but was defeated by fellow Liberal MHA Scott Reid.

On August 21, 2020, Trimper was appointed as parliamentary secretary to the minister of education and the minister of finance as well as special advisor to the premier on climate change. While serving as a back-bencher he led Private Member Resolutions on establishing a network of electric vehicle charge stations, achieving net zero emissions by 2050, increasing food self-sufficiency and reducing the prevalence of vaping in youth.

=== Independent (2020–2022) ===
On October 20, 2020, Trimper said transient people in Happy Valley-Goose Bay were "choosing" a risky lifestyle, in the wake of a video that showed an Inuk man being thrown to the ground during an arrest in the town by a municipal enforcement officer. On October 26, 2020, Trimper announced his resignation as parliamentary secretary and informed he would withdraw his nomination as a Liberal candidate. On November 10, 2020, Trimper announced that he had resigned from the Liberal Party and would seek re-election as an independent. In the 2021 provincial election, Trimper was re-elected as an independent.

In 2022, Trimper was one of the few MHAs to publicly oppose the Bay du Nord offshore oil project and released a video detailing the environmental impacts.

=== Government caucus (2022–2025) ===
On September 12, 2022, Premier Furey announced that Trimper would be rejoining the Liberal caucus.

In the 2025 Liberal Party of Newfoundland and Labrador leadership election Trimper supported John Abbott.

On May 20, 2025, Trimper made his final speech to the House of Assembly as he did not seek re-election in the 2025 election.

== Electoral history ==
2021 Newfoundland and Labrador general election: Lake Melville
Party	Candidate	Votes	%	±%
Independent	Perry Trimper	1,143	49.87	
Progressive Conservative	Shannon John Tobin	547	23.87	-12.07
Liberal	Michelle Baikie	306	13.35	-32.49
New Democratic	Amy Norman	279	12.17	
Independent	Andrew T. Abbass	17	0.74	
Total valid votes		2,292	99.13	
Total rejected ballots		20	0.87	
Turnout		2,312	36.39	
Eligible voters		6,353		
Independent gain from Liberal		Swing		+41.18
Source(s) "Officially Nominated Candidates General Election 2021" (PDF). Elections Newfoundland and Labrador. "NL Election 2021 (Unofficial Results)".

2019 Newfoundland and Labrador general election
Party	Candidate	Votes	%	±%
Liberal	Perry Trimper	1,517	45.8	
Progressive Conservative	Shannon John Tobin	1,189	35.9	
Independent	Jim Learning	603	18.2	
Total valid votes				
Total rejected ballots				
Turnout				
Eligible voters				

2015 Newfoundland and Labrador general election
Party	Candidate	Votes	%	±%
Liberal	Perry Trimper	1,840	62.0%	+46.77
Progressive Conservative	Keith Russell	850	28.6%	-21.39
New Democratic	Arlene Michelin-Pittman	280	9.4%	-25.39
Total valid votes		2,970	100.0	
