= Derrick Bragg =

Canadian politician (1964–2024)

The Honourable Derrick Bragg ECNL MHA
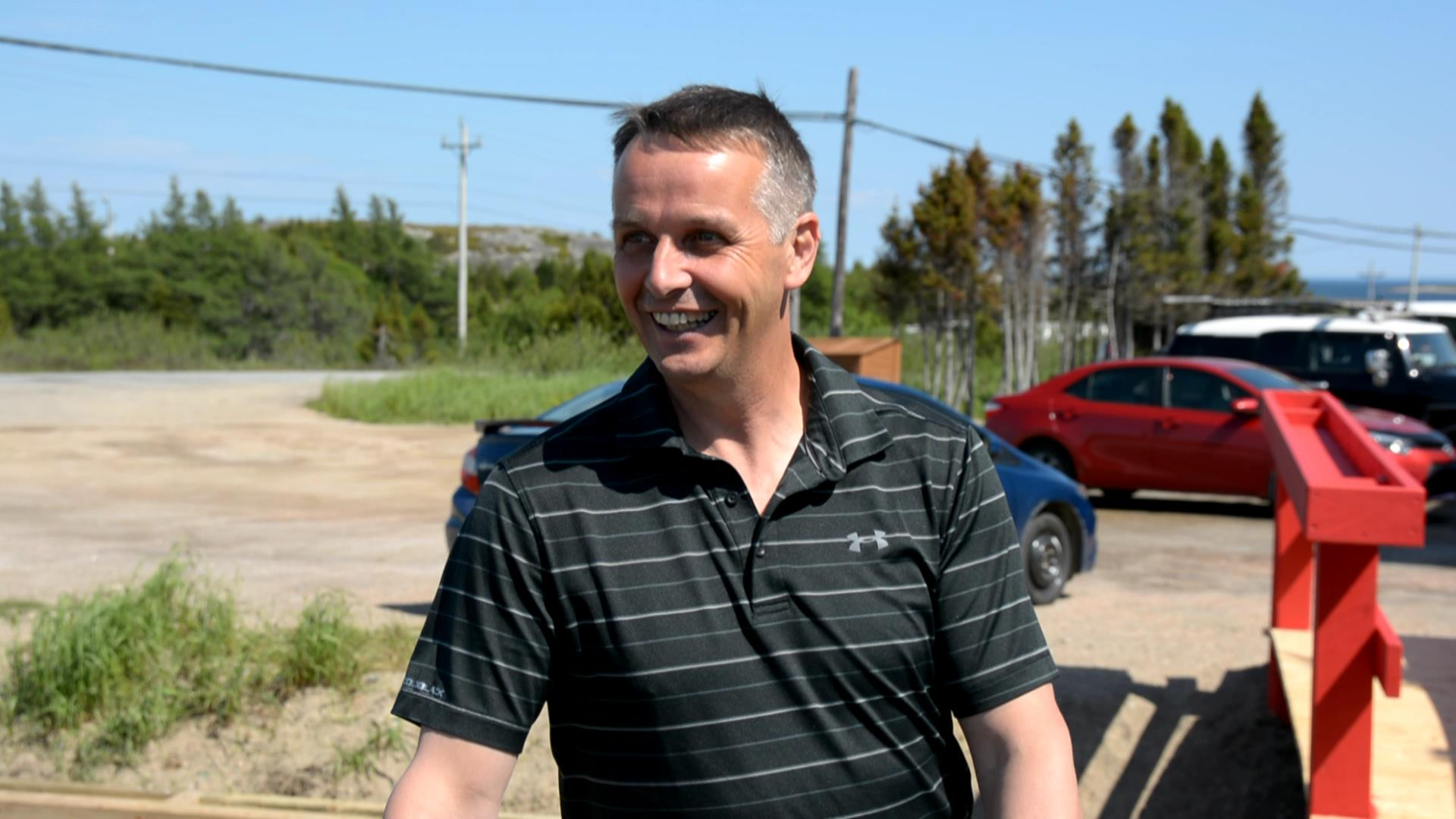
- Bragg in 2018

Minister of Fisheries, Forestry and Agriculture in Newfoundland and Labrador
- In office April 8, 2021 – June 14, 2023
- Preceded by: Elvis Loveless
- Succeeded by: Elvis Loveless

Minister of Transportation and Infrastructure, Minister Responsible for the Public procurement Agency in Newfoundland and Labrador
- In office August 19, 2020 – April 8, 2021
- Preceded by: Steve Crocker
- Succeeded by: Elvis Loveless

Minister of Municipal Affairs and Environment, Minister Responsible for the Multi-Materials Stewardship Board in Newfoundland and Labrador And Registrar General
- In office September 13, 2019 – August 19, 2020
- Preceded by: Perry Trimper
- Succeeded by: Derek Bennett

Member of the Newfoundland and Labrador House of Assembly for Fogo Island-Cape Freels
- In office November 30, 2015 – January 22, 2024
- Preceded by: Riding Established
- Succeeded by: Jim McKenna

Personal details
- Born: August 14, 1964 Greenspond, Newfoundland and Labrador, Canada
- Died: January 22, 2024 (aged 59) St. John’s Newfoundland and Labrador, Canada
- Party: Liberal
- Occupation: Town manager

Derrick Boyd Bragg (August 14, 1964 – January 22, 2024) was a Canadian politician who was elected to the Newfoundland and Labrador House of Assembly in the 2015 provincial election. He represented the electoral district of Fogo Island-Cape Freels as a member of the Liberal Party. He was born in Greenspond, Newfoundland and Labrador.

Bragg was re-elected in the 2019 provincial election. On September 13, 2019, he was appointed Minister of Municipal Affairs and Environment in the Ball government.

On August 19, 2020, he was appointed Minister of Transportation and Infrastructure, and Minister Responsible for the Public Procurement Agency in the Furey government. He was re-elected in the 2021 provincial election. On April 8, 2021, he was appointed Minister of Fisheries, Forestry and Agriculture.

On June 14, 2023, Bragg announced he was undergoing treatment for tongue cancer. Furey subsequently shuffled his cabinet and appointed Bragg Minister without portfolio. He died from cancer on January 22, 2024, at the age of 59.

== Electoral record ==
2021 Newfoundland and Labrador general election: Fogo Island-Cape Freels
Party	Candidate	Votes	%	±%
Liberal	Derrick Bragg	2,511	61.05	+6.74
Progressive Conservative	Sue Collins	1,507	36.64	-9.05
New Democratic	Jim Gill	95	2.31	
Total valid votes		4,113	99.64	
Total rejected ballots		15	0.36	-0.21
Turnout		4,128	40.74	-11.35
Eligible voters		10,132		
Liberal hold		Swing		+7.90
Source(s) "Officially Nominated Candidates General Election 2021" (PDF). Elections Newfoundland and Labrador. "2021 Provincial General Election Report" (PDF).

2019 Newfoundland and Labrador general election
Party	Candidate	Votes	%	±%
Liberal	Derrick Bragg	2,811	54.31	-15.58
Progressive Conservative	Sue Collins	2,365	45.69	+18.12
Total valid votes		5,176	99.42	
Total rejected ballots		30	0.58	+0.32
Turnout		5,206	52.10	+3.83
Eligible voters		9,993		
Liberal hold		Swing		-16.85

2015 Newfoundland and Labrador general election
Party	Candidate	Votes	%	±%
Liberal	Derrick Bragg	3,516	69.89	–
Progressive Conservative	Eli Cross	1,387	27.57	–
New Democratic	Rebecca Stuckey	128	2.54	–
Total valid votes		5,031	99.74	–
Total rejected ballots		13	0.26	–
Turnout		5,044	48.27	–
Eligible voters		10,450		
Liberal notional gain from Progressive Conservative		Swing		–
Source: Elections Newfoundland and Labrador
