= List of Land and Sea episodes =

The following is a list of episodes of the Canadian documentary series, Land and Sea, broadcast in Newfoundland and Labrador on CBC Television outlet CBNT-DT.

NOTE: This guide is a work in progress and changes will be made when more accurate information becomes available.

== Episodes ==
=== Season 3 (1966–1967) (Incomplete) ===
No. in season	Title	Host	Air date	Link
1	"The Portuguese White Fleet"	Angelo da Silva	1967	Link
2	"Valley of the Winds"	?	1967	N/A

=== Season 7 (1970–1971) (Incomplete) ===
No. in season	Title	Host	Air date	Link
1	"Torn from the Sea"	?	1971	N/A

=== Season 8 (1971–1972) (Incomplete) ===
No. in season	Title	Host	Air date	Link
1	"Buchans Plateau"	Dave Quinton	1972	Link

=== Season 9 (1972–1973) (Incomplete) ===
No. in season	Title	Host	Air date	Link
1	"People of the Torngats"	Dave Quinton	1973	Link

=== Season 11 (1974–1975) (Incomplete) ===
No. in season	Title	Host	Air date	Link
1	"Oldtimers"	Hal Andrews	1974	Link
2	"The Newfoundland Disaster"	Hal Andrews	1974	Link
3	"The River Man"	Dave Quinton	1974	Link

=== Season 12 (1975–1976) (Incomplete) ===
No. in season	Title	Host	Air date	Link
1	"Fogo Island Fishing"	Dave Quinton	1975	Link
2	"The Fishermen's Broadcast"	Dave Quinton	1975	N/A

=== Season 14 (1977–1978) (Incomplete) ===
No. in season	Title	Host	Air date	Link
1	"The Last Run"	N/A	September 14, 1977	Link
2	"Sisters and Fishers from West St. Modeste"	Dave Quinton	1977	Link

=== Season 15 (1978–1979) (Incomplete) ===
No. in season	Title	Host	Air date	Link
1	"The Clarenville Shipyard"	?	January 30, 1979	N/A
2	"Fogo Island Cod Traps"	Herb Davis	1979	Link
3	"Mushuau Innu"	Dave Quinton	1979	Link
4	"Triton"	Dave Quinton	1979	Link
5	"William Coaker and the FPU"	Dave Quinton	1979	Link

=== Season 16 (1979–1980) (Incomplete) ===
No. in season	Title	Host	Air date	Link
1	"Herb Pittman"	Herb Davis	October 24, 1979	Link
2	"Purse and Bar Seining for Mackerel in Southport"	N/A	January 9, 1980	Link
3	"Port au Choix"	Herb Davis	April 9, 1980	Link
4	"Aubrey Ellsworth and his Ayrshire Cows"	Dave Quinton	1980	Link
5	"Conception Bay North Fishermen on the Labrador"	Dave Quinton	1980	Link
6	"King of the River"	Dave Quinton	1980	Link
7	"Newfoundland's Scallop Capital"	Herb Davis	1980	N/A
8	"Port au Choix Shrimp"	Herb Davis	1980	Link
9	"The Avalon Herd"	Dave Quinton	1980	Link
Wildlife officer Mike Nolan has dedicated his career to saving Newfoundland's dwindling caribou herd.
10	"The Barrys of Merasheen"	Dave Quinton	1980	Link
11	"The New Squid Salesman"	Dave Quinton	1980	Link
12	"The Trouble with Whales (Part 1)"	Herb Davis	1980	Link
13	"The Trouble with Whales (Part 2)"	Herb Davis	1980	Link
14	"Wooden vs. Steel-hulled Longliners"	Herb Davis	1980	Link

=== Season 17 (1980–1981) (Incomplete) ===
No. in season	Title	Host	Air date	Link
1	"Martin Flynn"	Herb Davis	January 6, 1981	Link
2	"Them Days (Part 1)"	Dave Quinton	February 3, 1981	Link
3	"Them Days (Part 2)"	Dave Quinton	February 10, 1981	Link
4	"Air Sea Rescues"	Herb Davis	February 24, 1981	Link
5	"Change Islands (Part 1)"	Dave Quinton	March 10, 1981	Link
6	"Change Islands (Part 2)"	Dave Quinton	March 17, 1981	Link
7	"A Fisheries Crisis on the Burin Peninsula"	Dave Quinton	1981	Link
8	"Bay de Verde Cod Fishery"	Herb Davis	1981	Link
9	"Cape Shore Songs and Stories"	Dave Quinton	1981	Link
10	"Newtown"	Dave Quinton	1981	Link
11	"The Parsons Family: Farmers and Foster Parents"	Dave Quinton	1981	Link

=== Season 18 (1981–1982) (Incomplete) ===
No. in season	Title	Host	Air date	Link
1	"Troubled Waters"	Paul Harrington	January 6, 1981	Link
2	"A Trip to the Ice Fields"	Dave Quinton	March 9, 1982	N/A
3	"Off to Boston"	?	March 16, 1982	N/A
5	"Fishermen in Burgeo: Past and Present"	Paul Harrington	1982	Link
6	"Fishing on the Labrador Strait"	Dave Quinton	1982	Link
7	"Gillnetters"	Dave Quinton	1982	Link
8	"Snow Crab Fishery"	Dave Quinton	1982	Link
9	"The Mobile Fleet"	Dave Quinton	1982	Link
10	"Turning to Potatoes on the Northern Peninsula After Herring"	Dave Quinton	1982	Link
11	"Uneasy Tension as Lifestyles Change in Gros Morne"	Paul Harrington	1982	Link

=== Season 19 (1982–1983) (Incomplete) ===
No. in season	Title	Host	Air date	Link
1	"The Nordertor"	Paul Harrington	November 17, 1982	Link
2	"Centreville and Fair Island"	Dave Quinton	March 9, 1983	Link
3	"The Coates Family of Main Brook"	Paul Harrington	March 23, 1983	N/A
4	"Silviculture"	Dave Quinton	June 1, 1983	N/A
5	"Aquaculture"	Paul Harrington	1983	Link
6	"Cod Trapping in Lord's Cove"	Paul Harrington	1983	Link
7	"Longliners on the Labrador"	Paul Harrington	1983	Link
8	"Overfishing on the Tail of the Grand Banks"	Paul Harrington	1983	Link
9	"Reversing Population Loss in Petite Forte"	Dave Quinton	1983	Link
10	"The Sparkes Farming Family"	Paul Harrington	1983	Link
11	"Williams Dairy Farm"	Dave Quinton	1983	Link

=== Season 20 (1983–1984) (Incomplete) ===
No. in season	Title	Host	Air date	Link
1	"Rennie's River"	Dave Quinton	November 21, 1983	Link
2	"Baskets of Grass"	Dave Quinton	December 19, 1983	N/A
3	"Talamh an Éisc: The Land of Fish (Part 1)"	Dave Quinton	January 2, 1984	Link
4	"Talamh an Éisc: The Land of Fish (Part 2)"	Dave Quinton	January 9, 1984	Link
5	"A Question of Quality"	Paul Harrington	February 21, 1984	Link
6	"Bob Peddle's Family Farm in Bonavista Bay"	Dave Quinton	1984	Link
7	"Fighting Forest Fires by Plane in Newfoundland"	Paul Harrington	1984	Link
8	"Fishing at Five Islands on the Labrador"	Paul Harrington	1984	Link
9	"Francois"	Paul Harrington	1984	Link
10	"Researching Peat for Fuel in St. Shott's"	Dave Quinton	1984	Link
11	"St. Brendan's Stands Its Ground"	Dave Quinton	1984	Link
12	"Port de Grave"	Dave Quinton	1984	Link
13	"The Fisheries Cooperative on Fogo Island"	Paul Harrington	1984	Link
14	"The Legacy of Aunt Lydia of Lake Melville"	Paul Harrington	1984	Link
15	"West Coast Dairy"	Dave Quinton	1984	Link

=== Season 21 (1984–1985) (Incomplete) ===
NOTE: Originally broadcast on Monday nights.

No. in season	Title	Host	Air date	Link
1	"Our Forest: Life or Death"	Dave Quinton	October 15, 1984	Link
2	"Mackerel: The Last Chance"	Dave Quinton	December 10, 1984	N/A
3	"Christmas at Job's Cove"	Paul Harrington	December 18, 1984	Link
4	"Cook's Harbour Fishery"	Paul Harrington	1985	Link
5	"Fishing Out of Fox Harbour"	Paul Harrington	1985	Link
6	"Improving Salmon Stocks in St. Mary's"	Dave Quinton	1985	Link
7	"Partners on the Water"	Paul Harrington	1985	N/A
8	"Strawberry Fever"	Dave Quinton	1985	Link
9	"The Last Fishing Schooner: The Willing Lass"	Dave Quinton	1985	Link
10	"Trappers in the Autumn in Labrador"	Paul Harrington	1985	Link

=== Season 22 (1985–1986) (Incomplete) ===
NOTE: Originally broadcast on Monday nights.

No. in season	Title	Host	Air date	Link
1	"Scallops: A Last Resort"	Dave Quinton	December 9, 1985	Link
2	"A Fortune Bay Christmas"	Dave Quinton	January 6, 1986	Link
3	"The Winter Fishery Revisited"	?	March 10, 1986	N/A
4	"Herring: A Revival"	Paul Harrington	April 21, 1986	N/A
5	"Making a Living Far From Home on the Great Lakes"	Dave Quinton	1986	Link
6	"Mussel Farming"	Bill Kelly	1986	Link
7	"Plenty of Fish in St. Mary's Bay"	Dave Quinton	1986	Link
8	"Shipping to Labrador"	Dave Quinton	1986	Link
9	"Songwriter Lem Snow"	Dave Quinton	1986	Link
10	"The Black Bears of Newfoundland"	Dave Quinton	1986	Link
11	"The Inshore Fishery Fails on the Bonavista Peninsula"	Bill Kelly	1986	Link

=== Season 23 (1986–1987) (Incomplete) ===
NOTE: Originally broadcast on Monday nights.

No. in season	Title	Host	Air date	Link
1	"St. Pierre"	Bill Kelly	December 1, 1986	Link
2	"Fishing Along the French Shore"	Dave Quinton	December 8, 1986	Link
3	"Remembering This Land"	?	December 15, 1986	N/A
4	"Peddling Fish the American Way"	?	February 16, 1987	N/A
5	"Big Game Hunting in Newfoundland"	Dave Quinton	1987	Link
6	"Duke of Norfolk"	Bill Kelly	1987	Link
7	"Greenspond"	Dave Quinton	1987	Link
8	"The Challengers 4-H Club Strut Their Stuff"	Dave Quinton	1986	Link
9	"The Critch Brothers"	Bill Kelly	1986	Link
10	"The Pollock Fishery"	Dave Quinton	1986	Link

=== Season 24 (1987–1988) (Incomplete) ===
No. in season	Title	Host	Air date	Link
1	"The Turkey Farmer"	Bill Kelly	December 21, 1987	N/A
2	"Conception Bay Caplin for Japan"	Dave Quinton	1988	Link
3	"Eel Fishing near Glovertown"	Dave Quinton	1988	Link
4	"Fishing for Cod in Portugal Cove South"	Dave Quinton	1988	Link
5	"Foley's New Boat"	Bill Kelly	1988	N/A
6	"Labrador Diary (Part 1)"	Dave Quinton	1988	Link
7	"Labrador Diary (Part 2)"	Dave Quinton	1988	Link
8	"Newfoundland Fishermen in Nicaragua (Part 1)"	Bill Kelly	1988	Link
9	"Newfoundland Fishermen in Nicaragua (Part 2)"	Bill Kelly	1988	Link
10	"Selling Newfoundland Cod in Los Angeles"	Bill Kelly	1988	Link
11	"Springs in Newfoundland"	Dave Quinton	1988	Link
12	"The Fall Reward"	Dave Quinton	1988	Link
13	"The Fish Plant Wars of Trinity Bay"	Bill Kelly	1988	Link
14	"The Loss of the Myers III"	Bill Kelly	1988	Link
15	"West Coast Vet: Doc Klevorick"	Bill Kelly	1988	Link

=== Season 25 (1988–1989) (Incomplete) ===
No. in season	Title	Host	Air date	Link
1	"Trucking Industry"	Bill Kelly	January 16, 1989	N/A
2	"Managing Our Moose"	Dave Quinton	March 6, 1989	N/A
3	"Ed English of Bayside Seafoods"	Bill Kelly	1989	Link
4	"Farming in Bonavista Bay"	Dave Quinton	1989	N/A
5	"Indian Islands Reunion"	Dave Quinton	1989	N/A
6	"Inshore Fishing Along the South Coast"	Dave Quinton	1989	Link
7	"Newfoundland Seabirds"	Dave Quinton	1989	Link
8	"Newfoundlanders Working Up North and Out West"	Bill Kelly	1989	Link
9	"The Flying Fisherman of Daniel's Harbour"	Bill Kelly	1989	Link
10	"The Kings of Petty Harbour, Labrador"	Dave Quinton	1989	Link

=== Season 26 (1989–1990) (Incomplete) ===
NOTE: Originally broadcast on Monday nights.

No. in season	Title	Host	Air date	Link
1	"T&H Fishery of Cox's Cove"	?	December 4, 1989	N/A
2	"Gaultois: The Waiting Game"	Bill Kelly	January 8, 1990	Link
3	"The Impact of Quota Cuts on the Twillingate Fishery"	Dave Quinton	January 15, 1990	Link
4	"Newfoundland Silvers"	?	February 12, 1990	N/A
5	"Port aux Basques Winter Fishery"	Dave Quinton	February 19, 1990	Link
6	"Aboard the Maxwell"	Bill Kelly	1990	Link
7	"Fishery Trouble at the Tip of the Northern Peninsula"	Dave Quinton	1990	Link
8	"Inshore Cod Fishing in Notre Dame Bay"	Dave Quinton	1990	Link
9	"Lawn and Lord's Cove"	Dave Quinton	1990	N/A

=== Season 27 (1990) (Incomplete) ===
No. in season	Title	Host	Air date	Link
1	"Trouble at the Tip"	?	October 15, 1990	N/A
2	"Back Home to Rencontre East"	Bill Kelly	November 5, 1990	Link
3	"Soulie's Lost Mine"	?	November 26, 1990	N/A

=== Season 28 (1991–1992) (Incomplete) ===
No. in season	Title	Host	Air date	Link
1	"Going Back to a Simpler Time in Prowseton"	Pauline Thornhill	1992	Link
2	"The Goat Dance"	Pauline Thornhill	1992	N/A
3	"Remembering the SS Kyle"	Bill Kelly	1992	Link
4	"The Downswing of the Hook-and-Line Fishery in Burnt Islands"	Bill Kelly	November 26, 1990	Link

=== Season 29 (1992–1993) (Incomplete) ===
No. in season	Title	Host	Air date	Link
1	"Last of the Herd: Bison on Brunette Island"	Dave Quinton	1993	N/A
2	"Scallop Farming"	Pauline Thornhill	1993	N/A
3	"The Newfoundland Pony (Part 1)"	Pauline Thornhill	1993	N/A
5	"The Newfoundland Pony (Part 2)"	Pauline Thornhill	1993	N/A
5	"Townie Fishermen: The Hillier Family"	Bill Kelly	1993	Link

=== Season 30 (1993–1994) (Incomplete) ===
No. in season	Title	Host	Air date
1	"Grass Woman of Labrador"	Pauline Thornhill	1994
2	"Life on the Labrador (Part 1)"	Pauline Thornhill	1994
3	"Life on the Labrador (Part 2)"	Pauline Thornhill	1994
4	"The Farmers of Goose Bay"	Pauline Thornhill	1994
5	"The Pilgrim Patrol"	Pauline Thornhill	1994

=== Season 31 (1994–1995) (Incomplete) ===
No. in season	Title	Host	Air date	Link
1	"The Trouble with Beavers"	Pauline Thornhill	April 3, 1995	N/A
2	"The Plant Workers of Charleston"	Pauline Thornhill	May 1, 1995	Link
3	"Last of the Lighthouse Keepers"	Pauline Thornhill	May 8, 1995	N/A
4	"A Logger's Life"	Pauline Thornhill	1995	N/A
5	"Lake Melville Seal Hunt"	Pauline Thornhill	1995	N/A
6	"Restoring Historic Battle Harbour in Labrador"	Pauline Thornhill	1995	Link
7	"The Taverner's Last Run"	Pauline Thornhill	1995	Link

=== Season 32 (1995–1996) (Incomplete) ===
No. in season	Title	Host	Air date
1	"Dorothy Pleasance"	Pauline Thornhill	1996
2	"Return to Cutthroat"	Pauline Thornhill	1996
3	"Sled Dogs"	Pauline Thornhill	1996
4	"The d'Iberville Hike"	Pauline Thornhill	1996
5	"The Weir Fishery of Saglek"	Pauline Thornhill	1996

=== Season 33 (1996–1997) (Incomplete) ===
No. in season	Title	Host	Air date
1	"In Search of Moose"	Pauline Thornhill	1997

=== Season 34 (1997–1998) (Incomplete) ===
The thirty-fourth season of Land & Sea consists of at least 12 original episodes and 3 archival specials. These episodes were broadcast weekly on Monday nights.

No. in season	Title	Host	Air date
1	"The Falabella Man"	Pauline Thornhill	November 3, 1997
2	"Back on the Water"	Pauline Thornhill	December 8, 1997
3	"Songs of the Irish Cape Shore"	Pauline Thornhill	January 5, 1998
4	"The Mushuau Innu (archival special)"	N/A	January 12, 1998
Re-airing of a Season 15 episode from 1979.
5	"The Loss of the Myers III (archival special)"	N/A	January 19, 1998
Re-airing of a Season 23 episode from 1988.
6	"The Pig Farmer of Ferryland"	Pauline Thornhill	February 2, 1998
7	"Return to Silver Fox Island"	Dave Quinton	February 9, 1998
8	"Becoming an Outdoors Woman"	Pauline Thornhill	February 16, 1998
9	"Red Cliff Times (archival special)"	N/A	March 2, 1998
Re-airing of a Season 12 episode ("A Time in Red Cliff") from 1976.
10	"In the Name of the Pine Marten"	Pauline Thornhill	March 9, 1998
11	"Pine Marten Country"	Pauline Thornhill	March 23, 1998
12	"Harry Martin's Labrador"	Pauline Thornhill	April 6, 1998
13	"Labrador Road"	Pauline Thornhill	April 13, 1998
14	"The Ashuanipi Reunion"	Pauline Thornhill	April 20, 1998
15	"The Labrador Seal Hunt"	Pauline Thornhill	April 27, 1998

=== Season 35 (1998–1999) (Incomplete) ===
The thirty-fifth season of Land & Sea consists of at least 10 original episodes and 1 archival special. These episodes were aired biweekly on Friday nights.

No. in season	Title	Host	Air date
1	"The Labrador Seamstress"	Pauline Thornhill	October 9, 1998
2	"Bog Farmers of Seal Cove"	Pauline Thornhill	October 23, 1998
3	"Boston Seafood"	Pauline Thornhill	November 6, 1998
4	"In the Name of the Pine Marten (archival special)"	N/A	November 20, 1998
Re-airing of a Season 33 episode from March 1998.
5	"Mountain Bikers"	Pauline Thornhill	December 11, 1998
6	"Once Upon a Christmas Time"	Pauline Thornhill	December 25, 1998
7	"The Woodswoman"	Pauline Thornhill	January 15, 1999
8	"Bringing Back the Lobsters"	Pauline Thornhill	January 29, 1999
9	"A Private Issue"	Pauline Thornhill	February 12, 1999
10	"Caribou Concerns"	Pauline Thornhill	April 23, 1999
11	"Flying with Falcons"	Pauline Thornhill	April 30, 1999

=== Season 36 (1999–2000) ===
The thirty-sixth season of Land & Sea consists of 13 original episodes and 1 archival special. These episodes were aired biweekly on Friday nights.

No. in season	Title	Host	Air date
1	"The Land of Cod and Copper"	Pauline Thornhill	October 15, 1999
2	"Railway Walk"	Pauline Thornhill	October 29, 1999
3	"The Perfect Storm (Part 1)"	Pauline Thornhill	November 12, 1999
4	"The Perfect Storm (Part 2)"	Pauline Thornhill	November 26, 1999
5	"Once Upon a Christmas Time (archival special)"	N/A	December 10, 1999
Re-airing of a Season 34 episode from 1998.
6	"Milking the Market"	Pauline Thornhill	January 7, 2000
7	"The Food Fishery"	Pauline Thornhill	January 21, 2000
8	"The Artist as a Fisherman"	Pauline Thornhill	February 4, 2000
9	"If Wishes Were Horses"	Pauline Thornhill	February 18, 2000
10	"A Labrador Homecoming"	Pauline Thornhill	March 3, 2000
11	"The Unforgettable Fisherman"	Pauline Thornhill	March 23, 2000
12	"The Alpacas of Port au Port"	Pauline Thornhill	April 7, 2000
13	"The Mattea"	Pauline Thornhill	April 21, 2000
14	"Adventure Kayaking"	Pauline Thornhill	May 5, 2000

=== Season 37 (2000–2001) ===
The thirty-seventh season of Land & Sea consists of 14 original episodes. These episodes were broadcast weekly on Tuesday nights.

No. in season	Title	Host	Air date
1	"Sabrina of St. Carol's"	Pauline Thornhill	January 23, 2001
2	"A Picture of Exploits"	Pauline Thornhill	January 30, 2001
3	"Jacky's Giants"	Pauline Thornhill	February 6, 2001
4	"Cathi and Clayton"	Pauline Thornhill	February 13, 2001
5	"The Bonds of Earth (Part 1)"	Pauline Thornhill	February 20, 2001
6	"The Bonds of Earth (Part 2)"	Pauline Thornhill	February 27, 2001
7	"Rideout's Recipe for Homegrown Retirement"	Pauline Thornhill	March 6, 2001
8	"The Railway Ride"	Pauline Thornhill	March 13, 2001
9	"The Last of the Carbonear Stationers"	Pauline Thornhill	March 20, 2001
Land & Sea meets some of the last surviving participants of the Labrador summer cod fishery who still live in Carbonear. Jim Forward and Sybil Forward reminisce about their summers on the Labrador. This episode is dedicated to Sybil's memory.
10	"Death of a Fisherman"	Pauline Thornhill	March 27, 2001
11	"Changing Course"	Pauline Thornhill	April 3, 2001
12	"Ray Lake, A Son of St. Lawrence"	Pauline Thornhill	April 10, 2001
13	"A Thousand Flights and More"	Pauline Thornhill	April 17, 2001
14	"From the Stump Up"	Pauline Thornhill	April 24, 2001

=== Season 38 (2001–2002) ===
The thirty-eighth season of Land & Sea consists of 13 original episodes. The first six episodes premiered on Tuesday nights. In 2002, the show's timeslot was changed to Monday night for the remaining eight episodes.

No. in season	Title	Host	Air date
1	"The Wonderful Grand Hikers"	Pauline Thornhill	November 6, 2001
2	"An Ordinary Second"	Pauline Thornhill	November 13, 2001
3	"The Greenspond Letter"	Pauline Thornhill	November 20, 2001
A community of volunteers from Greenspond, Bonavista Bay produce The Greenspond Letter, a magazine documenting the folklore and genealogy of their rural Newfoundland hometown.
4	"The Keeper of the Cape"	Pauline Thornhill	November 27, 2001
5	"The Bee Charmers"	Pauline Thornhill	December 4, 2001
6	"A Lifetime of Seasons"	Pauline Thornhill	February 25, 2002
7	"Seven Days"	Pauline Thornhill	March 4, 2002
8	"Quest for a Catamaran"	Pauline Thornhill	March 11, 2002
9	"The Rangers"	Pauline Thornhill	March 18, 2002
10	"O'Grady's Irish Pipes"	Pauline Thornhill	March 25, 2002
11	"The Hero"	Pauline Thornhill	April 1, 2002
12	"The Springdale Christmas Whales"	Pauline Thornhill	April 8, 2002
13	"Musical Memories"	Pauline Thornhill	April 15, 2002

=== Season 39 (2002–2003) ===
The thirty-ninth season of Land & Sea consists of 16 original episodes. These episodes were broadcast on Wednesday nights.

No. in season	Title	Host	Air date
1	"The Southern Reflections"	Pauline Thornhill	October 23, 2002
2	"The Grand River"	Pauline Thornhill	October 30, 2002
3	"The Wreck of the Florizel"	Pauline Thornhill	November 6, 2002
4	"More Than Just a Pretty Place"	Pauline Thornhill	November 13, 2002
5	"The White Fleet"	Pauline Thornhill	November 20, 2002
6	"The Dust of His Ancestors"	Pauline Thornhill	January 15, 2003
7	"The Ocean Traveller"	Pauline Thornhill	January 22, 2003
8	"The Truth Lies in the Rocks"	Pauline Thornhill	January 29, 2003
9	"A Harvest of Seals"	Pauline Thornhill	February 5, 2003
10	"And Then There Was Light"	Pauline Thornhill	February 19, 2003
11	"A Portrait of Lights"	Pauline Thornhill	February 26, 2003
12	"The Gift"	Pauline Thornhill	March 5, 2003
13	"Resettlement: A Look Back"	Pauline Thornhill	March 12, 2003
14	"In Love with the Gander"	Pauline Thornhill	March 19, 2003
15	"Counting Coyotes"	Pauline Thornhill	April 2, 2003
16	"Fish Enough"	Pauline Thornhill	April 9, 2003

=== Season 40 (2003–2004) ===
The fourtieth season of Land & Sea consists of 13 original episodes and 1 archival special. These episodes were broadcast on Friday nights.

No. in season	Title	Host	Air date
1	"The Hugh Brothers"	Pauline Thornhill	October 24, 2003
2	"It's a Life"	Pauline Thornhill	October 31, 2003
3	"Their Story"	Pauline Thornhill	November 7, 2003
Land & Sea revisits the family of Patricia Pomeroy, whose resettlement from Paradise to Placentia was featured in the 1968 episode "Back to the Islands."
4	"A Dream Come True"	Pauline Thornhill	November 21, 2003
5	"Chatman's Bakery"	Pauline Thornhill	November 28, 2003
6	"Twin Cities Seniors Most Excellent Adventure"	Pauline Thornhill	January 30, 2004
7	"A Rare Breed"	Pauline Thornhill	February 6, 2004
8	"Torn from the Sea (archival special)"	N/A	February 13, 2004
Re-airing of a Season 7 episode from 1971.
9	"A Story with a Hook"	Pauline Thornhill	February 20, 2004
10	"Why They Stayed"	Pauline Thornhill	February 27, 2004
11	"The Early Years"	Pauline Thornhill	March 5, 2004
12	"The Peacemaker"	Pauline Thornhill	March 12, 2004
13	"Built with Pride"	Pauline Thornhill	March 19, 2004
14	"Seasons Remembered"	Pauline Thornhill	March 26, 2004

=== Season 41 (2004–2005) ===
The forty-first season of Land & Sea consists of 13 original episodes and 4 archival specials. These episodes were broadcast on Friday nights.

No. in season	Title	Host	Air date
1	"Our Story"	Pauline Thornhill	October 15, 2004
2	"The Split Peas"	Pauline Thornhill	October 22, 2004
3	"The Grey Islands' Eiders"	Pauline Thornhill	October 29, 2004
4	"The Irish Loop"	Pauline Thornhill	November 5, 2004
5	"Sole Survivor (Part 1)"	Pauline Thornhill	November 12, 2004
6	"Sole Survivor (Part 2)"	Pauline Thornhill	November 19, 2004
7	"The Farmer's Daughters"	Pauline Thornhill	November 26, 2004
8	"The Parsons of Lethbridge (archival special)"	N/A	November 26, 2004
Re-airing of a Season 17 episode ("Parsons Family") from 1981.
9	"Once Upon a Christmas Time (archival special)"	N/A	December 10, 2005
Re-airing of a Season 34 episode from 1998.
10	"The Snowshoe Man"	Pauline Thornhill	January 28, 2005
11	"I Arose From the Woodlands"	Pauline Thornhill	February 4, 2005
12	"People of the Torngats (archival special)"	N/A	February 11, 2005
Re-airing of a Season 8 episode from 1972.
13	"The Northern Nurse (Part 1)"	Pauline Thornhill	February 18, 2005
14	"The Northern Nurse (Part 2)"	Pauline Thornhill	February 25, 2005
15	"Salt Water Music"	Pauline Thornhill	March 4, 2005
16	"The Willing Lass (archival special)"	N/A	March 11, 2005
17	"From Wilderness to Wooddale"	Pauline Thornhill	March 18, 2005

=== Season 42 (2005–2006) ===
The forty-second season of Land & Sea consists of 11 original episodes and 2 archival specials. These episodes were broadcast on Monday nights.

No. in season	Title	Host	Air date
1	"King of the Sheep"	Pauline Thornhill	November 21, 2005
2	"Paddy Miller's House"	Pauline Thornhill	November 28, 2005
3	"The Saltwater Boys"	Pauline Thornhill	December 5, 2005
4	"Once Upon a Christmas Time (archival special)"	N/A	December 12, 2005
Re-airing of a Season 34 episode from 1998.
5	"Uncle Jim"	Pauline Thornhill	January 16, 2006
6	"Leaving Home"	Pauline Thornhill	January 30, 2006
7	"People Who Live by the Sea"	Pauline Thornhill	February 6, 2006
8	"Root Cellar Pride"	Pauline Thornhill	February 27, 2006
9	"Mining Memories"	Pauline Thornhill	March 6, 2006
10	"An Animal's Best Friend"	Pauline Thornhill	March 13, 2006
11	"Valley of the Winds (archival special)"	N/A	March 20, 2006
Re-airing of a Season 3 episode from 1967.
12	"My Burgeo Home"	Pauline Thornhill	March 27, 2006
13	"The Fruits of His Labour"	Pauline Thornhill	April 3, 2006

=== Season 43 (2006–2007) ===
The forty-third season of Land & Sea consists of 14 original episodes and 1 archival special. These episodes were broadcast on Monday nights.

No. in season	Title	Host	Air date
1	"A Few Tunes Between Friends"	Pauline Thornhill	October 16, 2006
2	"A Family Affair"	Pauline Thornhill	October 23, 2006
3	"Boys and Their Toys"	Pauline Thornhill	October 30, 2006
4	"The Planters"	Pauline Thornhill	November 6, 2006
5	"Labrador Diary (archival special)"	N/A	November 13, 2006
Re-airing of a Season 22 episode from 1988.
6	"My Highway, the Sea"	Pauline Thornhill	November 20, 2006
7	"The Organ Master"	Pauline Thornhill	November 27, 2006
8	"Wolf Dogs"	Pauline Thornhill	February 19, 2007
9	"Lawrence of the Lake"	Pauline Thornhill	February 26, 2007
10	"Music and Friends"	Pauline Thornhill	March 5, 2007
11	"The Daughter Who Did"	Pauline Thornhill	March 12, 2007
12	"Sunday Hunters"	Pauline Thornhill	March 26, 2007
13	"Torn from the Labrador Sea"	Pauline Thornhill	April 2, 2007
A continuation of the 1988 episode "Labrador Diary" directed by Dave Quinton.
14	"St. John's Harbour"	Pauline Thornhill	April 9, 2007
15	"The Cove of Love"	Pauline Thornhill	April 23, 2007
A profile of the southern Labrador community L'Anse Amour, which means "cove of love." Note that this episode was supposed to have aired on April 16, 2007, but an episode of Living Newfoundland and Labrador aired instead.

=== Season 44 (2007–2008) ===
The forty-fourth season of Land & Sea consists of 13 original episodes and 2 archival specials. These episodes were broadcast on Monday nights.

No. in season	Title	Host	Air date
1	"The Traveling Pig Farmer"	Pauline Thornhill	October 15, 2007
2	"Tony the Tailor"	Pauline Thornhill	October 22, 2007
3	"Changing Change Islands"	Pauline Thornhill	October 29, 2007
4	"Change Islands (Part 1)"	N/A	November 5, 2007
Re-airing of a Season 16 episode from 1981.
5	"The Perfect Little Goat"	Pauline Thornhill	November 12, 2007
6	"The Mighty Churchill"	Fred Greening	November 19, 2007
7	"The Tapestry of Conche"	Pauline Thornhill	November 26, 2007
8	"Never Forgotten"	Pauline Thornhill	January 21, 2008
9	"If It Looks Good, Shoot It"	Pauline Thornhill	January 28, 2008
10	"From Fortune Bay to Lourdes"	Pauline Thornhill	February 4, 2008
11	"Coaker"	N/A	February 11, 2008
Re-airing of a Season 14 episode from 1979.
12	"Zita of Fogo Island"	Pauline Thornhill	February 18, 2008
13	"Celie's Story"	Pauline Thornhill	February 25, 2008
88-years-old Cecilia "Celie" Smith of Hawke's Bay is the ultimate outdoors woman who continues to snare rabbits, trap beavers, and hunt for bears.
14	"Caught Out in a Storm"	Pauline Thornhill	March 3, 2008
Inspired by a young girl's presentation on the 1914 SS Newfoundland sealing disaster, which resulted in the deaths of 77 sealers including the girl's great-great-grandfather, Land & Sea interviews several individuals who are still connected to one of the defining historical events of pre-Confederation Newfoundland.
15	"Where the Old Horses Go"	Pauline Thornhill	March 10, 2008
Bob Martin, who came to Newfoundland from Nova Scotia 25 years ago, has been volunteering at the Horse and Pony Sanctuary in Hopeall, Trinity Bay to care for the elderly horses there.

=== Season 45 (2008–2009) ===
The forty-fifth season of Land & Sea consists of 13 original episodes and 3 archival specials. These episodes were broadcast on Monday nights. Beginning with this season, new episodes were produced in 16:9 widescreen resolution.

No. in season	Title	Host	Air date
1	"The Edge of the Ice"	Pauline Thornhill	October 20, 2008
Land & Sea joins three Inuit seal hunters from Makkovik, Labrador on their annual spring seal hunt. Once the livelihood of the people of northern Labrador, these men continue hunting with their new gear, but in the same way as their forefathers.
2	"Ashes Island"	Pauline Thornhill	October 27, 2008
Paddy Kelly of St. Brendan's lives off the land just as his grandfather had, farming his own potatoes and chopping his own wood. He hopes to start a new lobster fishery by conserving a spawning area off nearby Ashes Island, and he has encouraged his neighbours to close off the area to intruding lobster fishermen.
3	"When I Was in the San"	Fred Greening	November 3, 2008
Tuberculosis was a uniquely brutal killer in 20th-century Newfoundland. People still tell stories of the sanatoriums in Corner Brook and St. John's. Land & Sea documents some of the lives and legacies of those who persisted against Newfoundland's greatest epidemic.
4	"The Horse Lady"	Pauline Thornhill	November 10, 2008
Renee Butler Harnum of Whiteway is a lover of all animals, but she has a special fondness for horses. She makes paintings inspired by her many animals, including her three miniature horses Misty, Skipper, and King Henry.
5	"The Land of Fish (Part 2) (archival special)"	Pauline Thornhill	November 17, 2008
Re-airing of a Season 19 episode from 1984.
6	"All Around the Family"	Pauline Thornhill	November 24, 2008
Few play the accordion like Ray Walsh of Bay de Verde. While his 50-year musical career has seen him perform jigs and reels like I's the B'y with some of the province's most well-known musicians, he enjoys little more than playing with his son Greg.
7	"A Man Called Muck"	Pauline Thornhill	December 1, 2008
Kelligrews farmer Mervyl "Muck" Taylor's pig roasting truck has become a regular fixture of community events in the northeast Avalon Peninsula. Now retiring, Muck sold his famous pig barbecue to caterer Bruce Day of Upper Gullies, Conception Bay South, who hopes to make the new rotisserie the main attraction of his local business.
8	"Tracy Reid's Second Chance"	Pauline Thornhill	February 2, 2008
After a nearly-fatal ATV accident, 25-year-old Tracy Reid of Terra Nova sought to make the most out of her second chance. Once overweight, Tracy gained a passion for bodybuilding and has competed in professional competitions.
9	"A Lot of Good Memories"	Pauline Thornhill	February 9, 2009
Land & Sea profiles the town of Exploits, a formerly thriving fishing and shipbuilding community.
10	"The Westport of Westports"	Pauline Thornhill	February 16, 2009
The two dozen places around the world called Westport have taken turns hosting an annual convention bringing together residents from Westports all around the world. This year, it's the tiny town of Westport, Newfoundland and Labrador's turn to host, and Carl and Theresa Floyd see their chance to put their town on the map.
11	"Newtown: The Way It Used to Be (archival special)"	N/A	February 23, 2009
Re-airing of a Season 17 episode ("Newtown") from 1981.
12	"A Fisherman's Daughter"	Pauline Thornhill	March 2, 2009
Aspiring writer Megan Coles joins her father Nelson in fishing for lobster in their hometown of Savage Cove. Initially dismissive of her father's unstable occupation, Megan found herself becoming more sympathetic when she decided to move to Montreal and become a writer, a job which similarly faces financial uncertainty.
13	"The Crest of the Wave"	Pauline Thornhill	March 9, 2009
A sequel to the 1993 episode "Scallop Farming." Doug and Jennifer Caines have given up their scallop farm in Pool's Cove, but have returned to the small town to manage a prosperous salmon farm.
14	"Dr. Jeon"	Pauline Thornhill	March 16, 2009
Yong Kee Jeon came to Newfoundland from North Korea in 1966 as a medical student working at the cottage hospital in Brookfield, Bonavista Bay. He became a beloved doctor serving patients across northeastern Newfoundland. His wife Suk Gue faced the dual challenges of raising five children alone as well as staying connected with her Korean family.
15	"The Trouble with Whales (Part 1) (archival special)"	N/A	March 23, 2009
Re-airing of a Season 16 episode from 1980.
16	"The Cormiers of the Valley"	Pauline Thornhill	March 30, 2009
In the 1960s, Leo Cormier of Codroy Valley took a risk and started a dairy farm and a hen house, hoping that at least some of his nine children would stay in the family home. In 2009, three of Leo's sons were staying to manage the family business that he had started.

=== Season 46 (2009–2010) ===
The forty-sixth season of Land & Sea consists of 13 original episodes and 2 archival specials. These episodes were broadcast on Sundays. Because of the expansion of CBC's hour-long local newscasts to 90 minutes, the Maritime- and Newfoundland and Labrador-based shows now aired separate feeds on Sunday afternoons at 12:00 P.M. (12:30 P.M. in Newfoundland).

No. in season	Title	Host	Air date
1	"Wood or Nothing"	Pauline Thornhill	October 18, 2009
79-year-old shipbuilder Henry Vokey once owned a shipyard which employed many of the residents of Trinity before it shut down in the 1980s. However, not only does Henry continue to build boats in his shed despite dealing with arthritis, he hopes to soon build an old fashioned schooner, which would be the last of its kind in the province.
2	"Politics of the Pelt"	Pauline Thornhill	October 25, 2009
The European Union's recent seal products ban has many Newfoundland sealers worried about their livelihoods. Land & Sea talks to three people in Catalina and Twillingate whose jobs are directly impacted by the ban.
3	"Honouring Their Own"	Pauline Thornhill	November 1, 2009
Fogo Island's 50 Plus Seniors club hopes to preserve the stories and memories of their most senior residents. A federal government grant has enabled them to film interviews with 100 senior citizens over the age of 75 for a collection of DVDs that aims to honour Fogo's heritage.
4	"The Land of Fish (Part 1) (archival special)"	N/A	November 8, 2009
Re-airing of a Season 19 episode from 1984.
5	"The Only Child"	Pauline Thornhill	November 22, 2009
13-year-old Nathan Alyward is the only teenager living in Grandois, a fishing village with a population of less than 30 people. Although he feels that his life is boring, Alyward also gets to grow up with a certain sort of freedom that more urban children don't get to experience. Note that no Land & Sea episode aired on the week of November 15, 2009 due to a scheduling error. This episode was intended to premiere in the previous week.
6	"Racing Forwards"	Pauline Thornhill	November 29, 2009
The Forward family, who own and operate the Big R restaurant in St. John's, are also avid harness racers. Brad Forward takes a family tradition to the international stage as Canada's representative in the 2009 National Driving Championship held in Norway. Note that this episode was intended to premiere in the previous week.
7	"Gaby Gale"	Pauline Thornhill	December 6, 2009
Gaby Gale of Millville started gardening after her husband left for work in Alberta each summer. Their small greenhouse eventually expanded into Valley Nursery, a 13-thousand square foot plant metropolis. Note that this episode was intended to premiere in the previous week.
8	"The Garden of Mancel"	Pauline Thornhill	January 31, 2010
Mancel Halfyard of Woody Point, who lived an eventful life as a father of 10 children and a veteran of the Second World War, now maintains a humble garden which he considers to be his greatest legacy.
9	"Pretty as a Pitcher"	Pauline Thornhill	February 7, 2010
Land & Sea profiles the pitcher plant, one of Newfoundland and Labrador's provincial symbols. Known for its droopy appearance and carnivorous nature, the plant has inspired botanists and artists and attracts tourists from all over the world.
10	"The Finest of Firs"	Pauline Thornhill	February 14, 2010
For Everett and Marilyn Kinden of Lewisporte, Christmas is a big deal all year round. After selling some of the fir trees they would cut to make some extra money during the holiday season, the Kindens started their own Christmas tree farm in 1993, and they have mastered the science behind growing the perfect holiday decoration.
11	"What They'll Leave Behind"	Pauline Thornhill	February 21, 2010
Land & Sea documents the resettlement of Grand Bruit, where a small, aging population leaves for better services in Burgeo and Channel-Port aux Basques. They fear that the history and culture of their hometown will be forgotten in the coming generations.
12	"Baskets of Grass (archival special)"	N/A	February 28, 2010
Re-airing of a Season 19 episode from 1983.
13	"Shades of the Past"	Pauline Thornhill	March 7, 2010
Determined to keep the history of his birthplace alive, Stan Deering and his wife Loretta returned to Flatrocks near Freshwater, Conception Bay and started a museum called Shades of the Past, which hopes to build upon his thirty-year-old collection of personal artifacts.
14	"The Story of a Quarry"	Pauline Thornhill	March 14, 2010
John Hurley Sr. has successfully revived an slate quarry in Burgoyne's Cove and turned it into a prosperous family business with international clients.
15	"Fried Squirrels and Beaver Tales"	Pauline Thornhill	March 21, 2010
Labrador-born Hazel Tubrett makes delicacies from the "big land" using the array of animals trapped by her partner Dan Stanford. She cooks everything from squirrel and bear soup to french fries soaked in bear fat.

=== Season 47 (2010–2011) ===
The forty-seventh season of Land & Sea consists of 13 original episodes and 4 archival specials. These episodes were broadcast on Sundays.

No. in season	Title	Host	Air date
1	"The Time of Tunes"	Pauline Thornhill	October 17, 2010
Before much of Placentia Bay was resettled in the 1960s, 91-year-old Pete Barron of St. Joseph's was one of the area's most renowned accordion players. He performed for his first crowd at a kitchen party for a newlywed couple when he was just eight years old, and he shows no signs of stopping today.
2	"Island of Peace"	Pauline Thornhill	October 24, 2010
Samson Island, Notre Dame Bay was resettled in 1956, but Cal Potter has always called it home. In the past few years, Cal returned to his abandoned hometown to restore the cemetery and rebuild the wharves.
3	"Land and Sea Remembered (Part 1)"	Pauline Thornhill	October 31, 2010
4	"Land and Sea Remembered (Part 2)"	Pauline Thornhill	November 7, 2010
Former longtime Land & Sea host Dave Quinton shares some of his many memories producing the program from the 1960s to the 1990s. He documented on film such historical events as the establishment of the Fish, Food and Allied Workers Union in 1970, the 1992 Atlantic cod moratorium, and the last buffalo from their unsuccessful introduction in Brunette Island.
5	"The Nobles"	Pauline Thornhill	November 14, 2010
The Royal Newfoundland Constabulary Mounted Unit was initially abolished in 1951 following Confederation. But in 2003, the Mounted Unit was restored, and two percherons ("the Nobles") named Townshend and Vince started bringing their riders around downtown St. John's. Land & Sea explores how this proud unit was brought back.
6	"Mistaken Mystique"	Pauline Thornhill	November 21, 2010
Mistaken Point on the Southern Shore is home to some of the world's oldest Ediacaran fossils that were buried in volcanic ash over 579 million years ago, and the ecological reserve is of perpetual interest to paleontologists. Some of the fossils there are called Trepassia wardae after the nearby town of Trepassey and the local Ward family. Artists like Kelly Bruton have also been inspired by the ancient shores.
7	"The Grenfell (archival special)"	N/A	November 28, 2010
Re-airing of a Season 16 episode from 1981.
8	"Gone on the Track"	Pauline Thornhill	December 5, 2010
In 1980, a group of young Newfoundlanders from the Burin Peninsula working on the Canadian Pacific Railway were on their way back to their bunk houses when their bus got into a collision and caught fire, trapping them underneath it. The lost lives of twelve Newfoundlanders were honoured in a ceremony in Rushoon, and their story is told by survivor Gerald Synard.
9	"The Finest of Firs (archival special)"	N/A	December 12, 2010
Re-airing of a Season 45 episode from February 2010.
10	"The Mi'kmaq Way"	Pauline Thornhill	January 30, 2011
John Nick Jeddore, an elderly Mi'kmaq man from Conne River, continues to enjoy living off the land just as his ancestors had. He eats childhood favourites like eels, bear paws, and caribou at his tent in the woods.
11	"True Blue"	Pauline Thornhill	February 6, 2011
There are many Inuit legends surrounding the northern Labrador rock Labradorite. Today, it is often made into jewelry and rock carvings. Land & Sea explores the small industry that has formed around this captivating rock.
12	"The Squid Jiggin' Grounds (archival special)"	N/A	February 13, 2011
Re-airing of a Season 16 episode from 1980.
13	"The Quahog Shuffle"	Pauline Thornhill	February 20, 2011
Barry Nippard has made a life for himself in Prince Edward Island shuffling his feet for quahogs and fishing for oysters. Long after leaving the cod fishery, he continues to make a living from the sea.
14	"The Berry Belt"	Pauline Thornhill	February 27, 2011
Land & Sea documents the burgeoning berry industry in the outskirts of Grand Falls-Windsor, where people farm blueberries, cranberries, and the uncommon sea buckthorn.
15	"The Fisheries Broadcast (archival special)"	N/A	March 6, 2011
Re-airing of a Season 10 episode from 1975 in celebration of the The Fisheries Broadcast's 60th anniversary.
16	"Make It, Bake it, or Grow It"	Pauline Thornhill	March 13, 2011
Land & Sea visits the St. John's Farmer's Market and interviews some of the vendors selling local produce and other products.
17	"The Heart of Hagan's Hospitality"	Pauline Thornhill	March 20, 2011
Rita Hagan owns and operates Rita's Hospitality Home in Aquaforte, one of the most renowned bed and breakfasts in the province.

=== Season 48 (2011–2012) ===
The forty-eighth season of Land & Sea consists of 13 original episodes and 7 archival specials. These episodes were broadcast on Sundays.

No. in season	Title	Host	Air date
1	"Dulcie's in the Store"	Pauline Thornhill	October 16, 2011
Dulcie Toms is the beloved owner and operater of J. Toms' general store in Rattling Brook.
2	"The Car Buffs of the Bay"	Pauline Thornhill	October 23, 2011
Although most Newfoundlanders with a shed will use it to keep an ATV or a snowblower, many of the residents of St. Mary's use them to keep antique cars. Land & Sea meets with some of those who pamper their antique prizes.
3	"Resettlers Remember – The Fair Island Story"	Pauline Thornhill	October 30, 2011
Some of the former residents of the resettled village of Fair Island, Bonavista Bay return to their hometown to reminisce and remember.
4	"Greenspond (archival special)"	N/A	November 6, 2011
Re-airing of a Season 22 episode from 1987.
5	"The Igor Quilts"	Pauline Thornhill	November 13, 2011
Land & Sea documents a series of handmade quilts which made their way from British Columbia to Newfoundland in the aftermath of Hurricane Igor.
6	"The 21st Century Bayman"	Pauline Thornhill	November 20, 2011
Terrence Howell of Grates Cove owns an art studio operating from an old two-room schoolhouse. Having grown up in outport Newfoundland, Terrence is a forward-thinking man who enjoys travelling all around the world.
7	"Escape from the Cape"	Pauline Thornhill	November 27, 2011
Three fishermen from Makkovik, Labrador – Todd Broomfield, Errol Anderson, and Evan Anderson – found themselves clinging on for life on a ledge after their boat stalled in rough waters. They talk about how they survived until help arrived from the Canadian Coast Guard.
8	"The Mummer Man"	Jane Adey	December 4, 2011
Allan Young of Twillingate has been keeping the tradition of mummering alive for over 70 years.
9	"The Springdale Christmas Whales (archival special)"	N/A	December 11, 2011
Re-airing of a Season 37 episode from 2002.
10	"A Son of St. Lawrence (archival special)"	N/A	December 18, 2011
Re-airing of a Season 36 episode from 2001.
11	"A Picture of Exploits (archival special)"	N/A	January 8, 2012
Re-airing of a Season 36 episode from 2001.
12	"The Alpacas of Port au Port (archival special)"	N/A	January 15, 2012
Re-airing of a Season 35 episode from 2000.
13	"The Loss of the Myers III (archival special)"	N/A	January 22, 2012
Re-airing of a Season 23 episode from 1988.
14	"Bill Kelly"	Pauline Thornhill	January 29, 2012
Former Land & Sea host Bill Kelly lives a quiet life in Signal Hill, St. John's with his wife Flo after a long, eventful career with the CBC. When the show was cancelled in 1990 amidst the network's regional cutbacks, Bill fought to save the program despite battling heart disease. Land & Sea interviews Bill about his time producing Newfoundland and Labrador's longest-running television show as well as his successful fight to bring Land & Sea back on the air.
15	"Southern Shore Sri Lankans"	Pauline Thornhill	February 5, 2012
Two families of Sri Lankan immigrants live in Cape Broyle and work as mechanics. Despite their cultural differences, they have adapted well to the outport lifestyle and have been accepted by their community.
16	"Indian Islands Reunion (archival special)"	N/A	February 12, 2012
Re-airing of a Season 25 episode from 1989.
17	"Feel Free to Sit"	Pauline Thornhill	February 19, 2012
Otto Young owns a craft shop in Little Harbour near Twillingate. He has been building model boats and happily performs the accordion and ugly stick for tourist audiences.
18	"Rabinowitz Organic Farm"	Pauline Thornhill	February 26, 2012
Mike and Melba Rabinowitz, who are originally from the United States, are some of Newfoundland and Labrador's first organic farmers. They own and operate The Organic Farm in Portugal Cove–St. Philip's.
19	"What My Eyes Have Seen"	Pauline Thornhill	March 4, 2012
Rodney Barney of L'Anse-au-Loup, Labrador is legally blind, but he has made a living as an inshore fisherman despite his condition.
20	"Clara Oliver"	Pauline Thornhill	March 11, 2012
At 86 years old, Clara Oliver continues to hunt and go ice fishing with her daughter-in-law Del. She recounts growing up in Thorburn Road, St. John's.

=== Season 49 (2012–2013) ===
The forty-ninth season of Land & Sea consists of 13 original episodes and 4 archival specials. These episodes were broadcast on Sunday afternoons at 12:00 PM.

No. in season	Title	Host	Air date	Link
1	"The One and Only Celie"	Pauline Thornhill	October 21, 2012	Link
A sequel to the popular 2008 episode "Celie's Story," Land & Sea returns to Hawke's Bay to revisit Celie Smith. Now nearly 93 years old, Celie stays active by chopping wood, gardening, and building homes with her family, including her great-great-grandson Dawson.
2	"The Women Who Crossed an Ocean"	Pauline Thornhill	October 28, 2012	Link
During the Second World War, many servicemen in the Newfoundland Overseas Forestry Unit who were stationed in Scotland fell in love with local women, and some 800 of them crossed the Atlantic Ocean to be with their new husbands. Three of the Scottish war brides who moved to Trinity Bay – Annie George of Whiteway, Mary Suley of Heart's Delight, and Ruth Peddle of Old Perlican – share their experiences in adjusting to the outport Newfoundland lifestyle many decades ago.
3	"The Shepherd"	Jane Adey	November 4, 2012	Link
Sheep farmer Howard Morry of the Goulds, St. John's keeps the waning industry alive in his family. He owns and operates one of the last family-owned sheep farms in the province, and is a senior figure in the Sheep Producers Association of Newfoundland and Labrador (SPANL).
4	"Aunt Lydia Campbell (archival special)"	N/A	November 11, 2012	Link
Re-airing of a Season 19 episode from 1984.
5	"Lynda's Life"	Pauline Thornhill	November 18, 2012	Link
Lynda Empy of Winter Brook, Bonavista Bay was born with cervical dystonia which causes her head and hands to tremor. Despite this, she continues to live a fulfilling and busy life as a musician, a painter, a quilt sewer, and a hunter.
6	"Chef Jeremy"	Jane Adey	November 25, 2012	N/A
Jeremy Charles has elevated traditional Newfoundland cuisine into gourmet dining. Alongside Jeremy Bonia, he established the award-running Raymond's Restaurant in St. John's.
7	"The Avalon Herd (archival special)"	N/A	December 2, 2012	Link
Re-airing of a Season 16/17 episode from 1980.
8	"One Last Schooner"	Pauline Thornhill	December 9, 2012	Link
A sequel to the 2009 episode "Wood or Nothing." Henry Vokey has accomplished his dream of building an old fashioned schooner reminiscent of those in the former Labrador summer cod fishery. Land & Sea documents the Leah Caroline, which has set sail from the harbour in Trinity.
9	"The Mummer Man (archival special)"	N/A	December 16, 2012	N/A
Re-airing of a Season 47 episode from 2011.
10	"The Sky's the Limit"	Pauline Thornhill	January 27, 2013	N/A
Ben Ploughman of Port au Choix left his work as a petroleum geologist in the offshore oil industry to become an unconventional folk artist. In his studio, he produces art pieces depicting rural Newfoundland life using such materials as wooden lobster pots.
11	"Paterson's Rural Resolve"	Jane Adey	February 3, 2013	Link
Mike Paterson and his family from Upper Amherst Cove own and operate a woodworking business specializing in traditional Newfoundland furniture. Mike's daughter Katie Hayes has also built a successful business with the bakery at the Bonavista Social Club.
12	"Living Near Gros Morne (archival special)"	N/A	February 10, 2013	Link
Re-airing of a Season 17 episode from 1982.
13	"Frank and Mary"	Pauline Thornhill	February 17, 2013	Link
Frank and Mary Harvey of Bay Roberts are perhaps Newfoundland's oldest motorcyclists at the ages of 87 and 84 respectively.
14	"Hunting the Hunter"	Jane Adey	February 24, 2013	N/A
Land & Sea visits Spillar's Cove and meets some of Newfoundland and Labrador's coyote hunters, including Joe Fleming, Nathan Spence, and Chris Baldwin.
15	"Merasheen Magic"	Pauline Thornhill	March 3, 2013	Link
Merasheen was the most populous community in Placentia Bay to experience resettlement, but its surviving residents never truly abandoned it. Many families, including those of Marge Pittman and Ray Hann, return for the community reunion every five years.
16	"Wool Whisperers"	Jane Adey	March 10, 2013	Link
Various people in rural Newfoundland still knit for a living. Christine and Derrick LeGrow own a craft store called Spindrift in Outer Cove.
17	"Heartbeat"	Pauline Thornhill	March 17, 2013	N/A
Four Inuit sisters in Labrador perform drum music much as their ancestors once had.

=== Season 50 (2013–2014) ===
The fiftieth season of Land & Sea consists of 13 original episodes and 2 archival specials. These episodes were broadcast on Sundays.

No. in season	Title	Host	Air date
1	"That Magnificent Sausage"	Pauline Thornhill	October 20, 2013
2	"Louise Decker"	Pauline Thornhill	October 27, 2013
3	"Snowbird Sanctuary"	Pauline Thornhill	November 3, 2013
4	"The Kyle (archival special)"	N/A	November 10, 2013
Re-airing of a Season 27 episode from 1992.
5	"A Piece of Cake"	Pauline Thornhill	November 17, 2013
6	"On the Right Track"	Pauline Thornhill	November 24, 2013
7	"The Man Who Became Santa Claus"	Pauline Thornhill	December 1, 2013
8	"Like Father, Like Sons"	Pauline Thornhill	January 26, 2014
9	"Down Under"	Pauline Thornhill	February 2, 2014
10	"The Newfoundland Disaster (archival special)"	N/A	March 2, 2014
Re-airing of a Season 9/10 episode from 1974.
11	"Fog of the Outport"	Pauline Thornhill	March 9, 2014
12	"Stories of the Deep"	Pauline Thornhill	March 16, 2014
13	"A Pleasure of the Old Times"	Pauline Thornhill	March 22, 2014
14	"Welcoming the World"	Pauline Thornhill	March 30, 2014
15	"Pieces of the Past"	Pauline Thornhill	April 6, 2014

=== Season 51 (2014–2015) ===
The fifty-first season of Land & Sea consists of 15 original episodes and 7 archival specials. These episodes were broadcast on Sundays.

No. in season	Title	Host	Air date
1	"50 Years Old"	Pauline Thornhill and Dave Quinton	October 19, 2014
2	"The Shows That Touched You Most"	Pauline Thornhill	October 26, 2014
3	"The Big Land"	Pauline Thornhill	November 2, 2014
4	"A Vessel Van Gogh"	Pauline Thornhill	November 9, 2014
5	"St. Brendan's (archival special)"	N/A	November 16, 2014
Re-airing of a Season 20 episode from 1984.
6	"Riverside"	Pauline Thornhill	November 23, 2014
7	"Bowring Park: A Century of Memories"	Pauline Thornhill	November 30, 2014
8	"A Gift of Light"	Pauline Thornhill	December 7, 2014
9	"The Man Who Became Santa Claus (archival special)"	N/A	December 14, 2014
Re-airing of a Season 49 episode from 2013.
10	"Fish Enough (archival special)"	N/A	January 11, 2015
Re-airing of a Season 38 episode from 2003.
11	"The Perfect Storm (Part 1) (archival special)"	N/A	January 18, 2015
Re-airing of a Season 35 episode from 1999.
12	"The Perfect Storm (Part 2) (archival special)"	N/A	January 25, 2015
Re-airing of a Season 35 episode from 1999.
13	"Freezerland"	Pauline Thornhill	February 1, 2015
14	"Fallen War Birds"	Pauline Thornhill	February 8, 2015
15	"Newfoundland's Scallop Capital (archival special)"	N/A	February 15, 2015
Re-airing of a Season 16 episode ("Scallops") from 1980.
16	"A Diary of Dover"	Pauline Thornhill	February 16, 2015
17	"Visions of Vineyards"	Pauline Thornhill	March 1, 2015
18	"The Man Who Sings Like Roy"	Pauline Thornhill	March 8, 2015
19	"The Taverner's Last Run (archival special)"	N/A	March 15, 2015
Re-airing of a Season 31 episode from 1995.
20	"Fishing For a Future"	Pauline Thornhill	March 22, 2015
21	"The Little SPCA That Could"	Pauline Thornhill	March 29, 2015
22	"The Make and Break Man"	Pauline Thornhill	April 5, 2015

=== Season 52 (2015–2016) ===
The fifty-second season of Land & Sea consists of 11 original episodes and 5 archival specials. These episodes were broadcast on Sundays. This was the first season where Christopher Richardson of Cranky Goat Productions began producing episodes for the show.

No. in season	Title	Host	Air date
1	"The Quiet Cove"	Pauline Thornhill	October 25, 2015
2	"Berkley and the Pickle Factory"	Pauline Thornhill	November 1, 2015
3	"Where Once they Mattered (Part 1)"	Pauline Thornhill	November 8, 2015
4	"Where Once they Mattered (Part 2)"	Pauline Thornhill	November 15, 2015
5	"No Holds Barred"	Pauline Thornhill	November 22, 2015
6	"Fishing Couples (archival special)"	N/A	January 3, 2016
Re-airing of a Season 21 episode from 1985.
7	"The Land of Cod and Copper (archival special)"	N/A	January 10, 2016
Re-airing of a Season 35 episode from 1999.
8	"Harry Martin's Labrador (archival special)"	N/A	January 17, 2016
Re-airing of a Season 33 episode from 1998.
9	"The Grey Islands Eiders (archival special)"	N/A	January 24, 2016
Re-airing of a Season 40 episode from 2004.
10	"The Little Red Stage"	Pauline Thornhill	January 31, 2016
11	"A Teen and a Tractor"	Pauline Thornhill	February 7, 2016
12	"The High Flyer of Daniel's Harbour"	Christopher Richardson	February 14, 2016
13	"You Come By Boat (archival special)"	N/A	February 21, 2016
Re-airing of a Season 21 episode from 1986.
14	"The Flying Photographer (Part 1)"	Pauline Thornhill	February 28, 2016
15	"The Flying Photographer (Part 2)"	Pauline Thornhill	March 6, 2016
16	"Sweet Forget Me Nots"	Christopher Richardson	March 13, 2016

=== Season 53 (2016–2017) ===
The fifty-third season of Land & Sea consists of 10 original episodes and 4 archival specials. These episodes were broadcast on Sundays.

No. in season	Title	Host	Air date
1	"The Bag Ladies"	Pauline Thornhill	October 16, 2016
2	"Bread and a Bicycle"	Pauline Thornhill	October 23, 2016
3	"Change Islands' Designing Women"	Christopher Richardson	October 30, 2016
4	"The Weir Fishery of Saglek (archival special)"	N/A	November 6, 2016
Re-airing of a Season 32 episode from 1996.
5	"Jerry's Chainsaw Carvings"	Pauline Thornhill	November 13, 2016
6	"The Lure of the Lighthouse"	Christopher Richardson	November 20, 2016
7	"The Legacy of Little Harbour West"	Pauline Thornhill	November 27, 2016
8	"A Gift of Light (archival special)"	N/A	December 4, 2016
Re-airing of a Season 50 episode from 2014.
9	"Our Haven, Our Home"	Pauline Thornhill	February 5, 2017
10	"The Edge of the Avalon"	Pauline Thornhill	February 12, 2017
11	"Lake Melville Seal Hunt (archival special)"	N/A	February 18, 2017
Re-airing of a Season 31 episode from 1995.
12	"Eat It Wild"	Pauline Thornhill	February 26, 2017
13	"Bill Kelly (archival special)"	N/A	March 5, 2017
Re-airing of a Season 47 episode from 2012 to commemorate Kelly's death.
14	"The Colours of a Rainbow"	Pauline Thornhill	March 12, 2017

=== Season 54 (2017–2018) ===
The fifty-fourth season of Land & Sea consists of 14 original episodes and 3 archival specials. These episodes were broadcast on Sundays.

No. in season	Title	Host	Air date
1	"The Tiniest Town"	Pauline Thornhill	October 15, 2017
2	"Hot Miracle Man"	Pauline Thornhill	October 22, 2017
3	"The History Keeper of Exploits"	Christopher Richardson	October 29, 2017
4	"The Hilliers (archival special)"	N/A	November 4, 2017
Re-airing of a Season 29 episode from 1993.
5	"It's Worth the Drive (Part 1)"	Pauline Thornhill	November 12, 2017
6	"It's Worth the Drive (Part 2)"	Pauline Thornhill	November 19, 2017
7	"The Labrador Lumberjack"	Christopher Richardson	November 26, 2017
8	"The Mummer Man (archival special)"	N/A	December 3, 2017
Re-airing of a Season 47 episode from 2011.
9	"Galliott Studios"	Christopher Richardson	January 7, 2018
10	"Vernon's Toy Box"	Christopher Richardson	January 14, 2018
11	"Pearcey's Twine Store Proprietor"	Christopher Richardson	January 21, 2018
12	"The Trouble with Beavers (archival special)"	N/A	January 28, 2018
Re-airing of a Season 30 episode from 1995.
13	"Cousins, Cousins, Cousins"	Pauline Thornhill	February 4, 2018
14	"Labour of Love"	Christopher Richardson	March 3, 2018
15	"Return to Riverside"	Pauline Thornhill	March 19, 2018
16	"The Calvin Way"	Christopher Richardson	March 25, 2018
17	"A Rabbit Named Peter"	Pauline Thornhill	April 1, 2018

=== Season 55 (2018–2019) ===
The fifty-fifth season of Land & Sea consists of 12 original episodes and 3 archival specials. These episodes were broadcast on Sundays.

No. in season	Title	Host	Air date
1	"Not Your Run-of-the-Mill Guy"	Pauline Thornhill	October 14, 2018
2	"Burgeo Come From Away"	Christopher Richardson	October 21, 2018
3	"Miracle on Ross Avenue"	Pauline Thornhill	October 28, 2018
4	"The Cat's Meow"	Pauline Thornhill	November 4, 2018
5	"The Grand River (archival special)"	N/A	November 11, 2018
Re-airing of a Season 38 episode from 2002.
6	"The Homesteaders"	Christopher Richardson	November 18, 2018
7	"It's All Good"	Pauline Thornhill	November 25, 2018
8	"The Mummer Man (archival special)"	Pauline Thornhill	December 2, 2018
Re-airing of a Season 47 episode from 2011.
9	"Just the Beginning"	Pauline Thornhill	January 27, 2019
10	"Riding the Rails"	Christopher Richardson	February 3, 2019
11	"Bringing Back Battle Harbour"	Pauline Thornhill	February 10, 2019
12	"The Ashuanipi Reunion (archival special)"	N/A	February 10, 2019
Re-airing of a Season 33 episode from 1998.
13	"Happy Trails"	Pauline Thornhill	February 24, 2019
14	"The Face of Grey River"	Christopher Richardson	March 3, 2019
15	"A Shore Thing"	Pauline Thornhill	March 10, 2019

=== Season 56 (2019–2020) ===
The fifty-sixth season of Land & Sea consists of 12 original episodes and 10 archival specials. These episodes were broadcast on Sundays. Towards the end of this season, episode production was significantly impacted by the COVID-19 pandemic, and a series of archival specials from season 44 were aired.

No. in season	Title	Host	Air date
1	"Labrador's Own (Part 1)"	Pauline Thornhill	October 20, 2019
2	"Labrador's Own (Part 2)"	Pauline Thornhill	October 27, 2019
3	"Fogo Island Woodworks"	Christopher Richardson	November 3, 2019
4	"The Little Lumberjack"	Pauline Thornhill	November 10, 2019
5	"The Woman in the Wheelhouse"	Pauline Thornhill	November 17, 2019
6	"By Hook or By Crook"	Pauline Thornhill	November 24, 2019
7	"A Gift of Light (archival special)"	N/A	December 1, 2019
Re-airing of a Season 50 episode from 2014.
8	"The Happy Campers"	Pauline Thornhill	January 19, 2020
9	"The Creatures Called Sea Cucumbers"	Pauline Thornhill	January 26, 2020
10	"The Hidden Gem"	Pauline Thornhill	February 2, 2020
11	"The Time in the Hall Dancers"	Pauline Thornhill	February 9, 2020
12	"Freshwater Cowboys"	Christopher Richardson	February 16, 2020
13	"Bill Gregory Off-Air"	Pauline Thornhill	February 23, 2020
14	"The Edge of the Ice (archival special)"	N/A	March 1, 2020
Re-airing of a Season 44 episode from 2008.
15	"Ashes Island (archival special)"	N/A	March 8, 2020
Re-airing of a Season 44 episode from 2008.
16	"When I Was In the San (archival special)"	N/A	March 15, 2020
Re-airing of a Season 44 episode from 2008.
17	"The Horse Lady (archival special)"	N/A	March 22, 2020
Re-airing of a Season 44 episode from 2008.
18	"All Around the Family (archival special)"	N/A	March 29, 2020
Re-airing of a Season 44 episode from 2008. This special was broadcast in dedication to Ray Walsh, who had died in 2019.
19	"A Man Called Muck (archival special)"	N/A	April 5, 2020
Re-airing of a Season 44 episode from 2008.
20	"Tracy Reid's Second Chance (archival special)"	N/A	April 12, 2020
Re-airing of a Season 44 episode from 2009.
21	"A Lot of Good Memories (archival special)"	N/A	April 19, 2020
Re-airing of a Season 44 episode from 2009.
22	"The Westport of Westports (archival special)"	N/A	April 26, 2020
Re-airing of a Season 44 episode from 2009.

=== Season 57 (2020–2021) ===
The fifty-seventh season of Land & Sea consists of 14 archival specials and 2 original episodes. These episodes were broadcast on Sundays. Much like the previous season, production of original episodes during this season was significantly impacted by the COVID-19 pandemic.

No. in season	Title	Host	Air date
1	"The South Coast Fishery (archival special)"	N/A	October 18, 2020
Re-airing of a Season 25 episode from 1989.
2	"Life on the Labrador (Part 1) (archival special)"	N/A	October 25, 2020
Re-airing of a Season 30 episode from 1994.
3	"Life on the Labrador (Part 1) (archival special)"	N/A	November 1, 2020
Re-airing of a Season 30 episode from 1994.
4	"Fishing Along the French Shore (archival special)"	N/A	November 8, 2020
Re-airing of a Season 22 episode from 1986.
5	"The Grass Lady (archival special)"	N/A	November 15, 2020
Re-airing of a Season 29 episode ("Grass Woman of Labrador") from 1994.
6	"The Flying Fisherman of Daniel's Harbour (archival special)"	N/A	November 22, 2020
Re-airing of a Season 24 episode from 1989.
7	"The Kings of Petty Harbour (archival special)"	N/A	November 29, 2020
Re-airing of a Season 24 episode from 1989.
8	"The Goat Dance (archival special)"	N/A	December 6, 2020
Re-airing of a Season 27 episode from 1992.
9	"Five Islands (archival special)"	N/A	January 17, 2021
Re-airing of a Season 20 episode from 1984.
10	"The Newfoundland Pony (Part 1) (archival special)"	N/A	January 24, 2021
Re-airing of a Season 29 episode from 1993.
11	"The Newfoundland Pony (Part 2) (archival special)"	N/A	January 31, 2021
Re-airing of a Season 29 episode from 1993.
12	"Lawn and Lord's Cove (archival special)"	N/A	February 7, 2021
Re-airing of a Season 25 episode from 1990.
13	"The Pilgrim Patrol (archival special)"	N/A	February 21, 2021
Re-airing of a Season 29 episode from 1994.
14	"Farming in Bonavista Bay (archival special)"	N/A	March 22, 2021
Re-airing of a Season 29 episode from 1989.
15	"It's An Audrey Thing"	Christopher Richardson	March 22, 2021
Audrey Stuckless of Purbeck's Cove posts traditional home-cooked Newfoundland recipes for her large Facebook following.
16	"The Homestead at Flatrock"	Christopher Richardson	March 28, 2021
David Goodyear owns a self-sufficient home in Flatrock which he calls "The Homestead."

=== Season 58 (2021–2022) ===
The fifty-eighth season of Land & Sea consists of 12 original episodes. These episodes were broadcast on Sundays at 11:30 AM NT. This was the last season where Pauline Thornhill was the primary host.

No. in season	Title	Host	Air date
1	"65 Years a Mechanic"	Pauline Thornhill	November 7, 2021
Although he officially retired 24 years ago, 86-year-old John Parrell of St. Philip's continues to enjoy working as a mechanic in his garage. Land & Sea visits Parrell and speaks with some of his friends and regular clients.
2	"The Allen Brothers"	Pauline Thornhill	November 14, 2021
Two elderly brothers, Cliff Allen and Wilbur Allen, build traditional wooden boats in a shed across their two properties in Bay Roberts. Originally from the abandoned community of Haystack, Placentia Bay, the two brothers make one last trip to their old hometown, Cliff travelling using a Rodney boat that he and Wilbur built.
3	"Champ's Journey Home"	Christopher Richardson	November 22, 2021
Sri Lankan native Chamira "Champ" Milinda, a graduate of Keyin College, has worked at Dot's Bakery & Coffee Shop in L'Anse-au-Loup, Labrador for the past decade. A passionate baker, Milinda has formed a close bond with Warrick and Narissa Belbin, the owners of Dot's Bakery. Although he had spent time in Ottawa, Milinda prefers the quieter life of southern Labrador.
4	"Heber McGurk's Stories of a Lifetime"	Pauline Thornhill	November 28, 2021
Craftsman and writer Heber McGurk of Carbonear once served as the master watch on the SS Kyle, which has been aground in Harbour Grace since 1967. He has valuable slides and a working projector with photographs from his time on the historic ferry ship. McGurk enjoys sharing his stories, and his handicrafts can be found at a local arts and crafts store in Carbonear.
5	"Marystown Models"	Christopher Richardson	December 5, 2021
Land & Sea visits the Model Ship Gallery at the shopping mall in Marystown. Tour guides Jim Myles and Kerry Wiscombe and model boat builder Art Walsh curate one of the largest model boat collections in Canada, which was largely sold to them from the family of museum owner John Keith-King of Granville Island, British Columbia. They talk about the restoration process and show off their models of the RMS Queen Mary and the HMS Hood.
6	"The Stories of St. Lawrence"	Pauline Thornhill	February 27, 2022
Through the eyes of local tour guide Carl Slaney, operator of Laurentian Legacy Tours, Land & Sea looks at the extensive history of the town of St. Lawrence. He discusses the 1929 earthquake and tidal wave, the economic prosperity brought by the fluorspar mines, and the 1942 rescue of the crew of the beached USS Truxtun and USS Pollux. Note that the 2022 Winter Olympics had pre-empted Land & Sea for the rest of February 2022.
7	"No Place Like It (Part 1)"	Christopher Richardson	March 20, 2022
Ed O'Reilly makes YouTube videos where he visits resettled outports onboard the Siboney. Land & Sea joins him on a tour of southern Labrador, and they visit an old cemetery in Henley Harbour and the schoolhouse in George's Cove.
8	"No Place Like It (Part 2)"	Christopher Richardson	March 27, 2022
Ed O'Reilly's tour through southern Labrador continues by exploring the abandoned whaling station in Hawke Harbour. He then stays the night anchored at Triangle Harbour before heading out to Occasional Harbour, where there was once a summer fishing station.
9	"The Fight for the Fish"	Jane Adey	April 3, 2022
Two fishermen from Fermeuse, father-and-son team Jerry Chidley and Gerard Chidley, are some of Newfoundland and Labrador's few commercial bluefin tuna fishermen. As they're some of the fastest fish in the Atlantic Ocean, the Chidleys face challenges trying to catch them onboard their vessel the Atlantic Champion. The regulations on this fishery are examined from the perspective of fisheries scientists Dheeraj Busawon and Alex Hanke at the St. Andrews Biological Station in St. Andrews, New Brunswick.
10	"The Mercer Sisters"	Pauline Thornhill	April 10, 2022
The five Mercer sisters, all originally from Horwood, were successful contestants on Family Feud Canada in the winter of 2020. Land & Sea meets the sisters during a reunion and joins them in Horwood for a celebration at the community hall. Although none of them live in Horwood anymore, they are still proud to call it home.
11	"The Girl They Call Junior"	Pauline Thornhill	April 17, 2022
17-year-old beauty pageant contestant Taylor Reid of Chapel Arm enjoys nothing more than moose hunting with her father Shawn. Reid discusses her atypical interests and shows off the rack from her first ever moose that she had killed two years ago.
12	"A Family's Way Home"	Pauline Thornhill	April 24, 2022
Nine siblings and their mother from Parker's Cove were forced to move into public housing in Marystown after their father Peter Murphy died of a heart attack in 1977. Some of the Murphy siblings later purchased their old family home, and they are reunited there for the first time over forty years later.

=== Season 59 (2022–2023) ===
The fifty-ninth season of Land & Sea consists of 8 original episodes and 5 archival specials. These episodes were broadcast on Sunday mornings at 11:00 AM NT. This was the first season where Jane Adey was the primary host.

No. in season	Title	Host	Air date
1	"Reclaiming Happiness"	Jane Adey	November 6, 2022
Tired of city life in St. John's, rotating nurse and offshore oil worker Jonathan White returned to Twillingate with his wife Liz White and their three children to start a handicrafts shop. The couple own and operate The White's Emporium and sell folk art pieces made from driftwood that washes up on shore. Land & Sea explores what motivated the Whites to return to rural Newfoundland and how they made their unlikely venture successful.
2	"Off Beat and Off Grid"	Jane Adey	November 13, 2022
Former Portugal Cove resident Nancy Churchill decided to move to Port Rexton and start an off-grid farm where she lives a self-sufficient life. She makes her own soap using the milk from her goats.
3	"The Farmers of Goose Bay (archival special)"	N/A	November 20, 2022
Re-airing of a Season 29 episode from 1994.
4	"Family Prospects"	Jane Adey	November 27, 2022
In 1992, Land & Sea visited three prospectors, the Keats brothers, who struck gold soon after the episode aired. The show revisits the family thirty years later, where Kevin Keats continues the prospecting family tradition.
5	"Whales, Tales, and Trails"	Jane Adey	December 4, 2022
The sight of whales breaching in the water has long been a key element of Newfoundland and Labrador tourism, and David Hayashida believed that whale skeletons could draw similar crowds. With the help of conservationist and whale scientist Jon Lien ("the whale man"), a team of volunteers gathered the whale bones and displayed them in several beaches in central Newfoundland as part of a "whale trail," but federal government funding for the project dried up in 2005. Hayashida and former mayor of La Scie Clyde Saunders express their wishes to see the completion of their whale trail project.
6	"Why They Stayed (archival special)"	N/A	January 15, 2023
Re-airing of a Season 39 episode from 2004.
7	"Crafts at Risk"	Jane Adey	February 5, 2023
In an effort to preserve the province's traditional crafts, Heritage NL pairs up willing apprentices with craft mentors. Land & Sea meets several of these mentor-student duos. Richard Park of Gillams is teaching his daughter how to make birch brooms; Mi'kmaq moccasin designer Loretta John is tutoring Kevin Drew; Guy Barnable of Ferryland teaches other local residents how to make wriggle fences.
8	"Scallop Farming (archival special)"	N/A	February 12, 2023
Re-airing of a Season 29 episode from 1993.
9	"Iceberg Impressions"	Jane Adey	February 19, 2023
Land & Sea visits Twillingate, the "Iceberg Capital of the World," and discusses the popularity of iceberg boat tours with Chris Scott, manager of Twillingate Adventure Tours. Due to climate change, iceberg tourism may soon be a thing of the past. Oceanographer Frederic Cyr explains how warming global temperatures have caused ice to melt much faster than in previous decades.
10	"Dorothy Pleasance (archival special)"	N/A	February 26, 2023
Re-airing of a Season 32 episode from 1996.
11	"The d'Iberville Hike (archival special)"	N/A	March 5, 2023
Re-airing of a Season 31/32 episode from 1996.
12	"Science and the Labrador Sea (Part 1)"	Jane Adey	March 12, 2023
13	"Science and the Labrador Sea (Part 2)"	Jane Adey	March 19, 2023
The CCGS Amundsen surveys the Arctic Ocean, monitoring icebergs and studying marine life in Northern Canada.

=== Season 60 (2023–2024) ===
The sixtieth season of Land & Sea consists of 13 original episodes and 3 archival specials. These episodes were broadcast on Sunday mornings at 11:30 AM NT.

No. in season	Title	Host	Air date
1	"The Daring Dorymen"	Jane Adey	October 22, 2023
Maurice Kearley of Fortune was just 16 years old when he became a deck hand on a schooner bound for the Grand Banks summer cod fishery. Now one of the last living dorymen, Kearley recounts his many adventures as Land & Sea covers the history and legacy of this long-gone industry.
2	"The Grey Islands Caribou Revival"	Jane Adey	October 29, 2023
The Grey Islands were once home to a bountiful herd of caribou, but after they were hunted to near extinction, hunting on the island was banned in 2016. However, thanks to the efforts of the provincial wildlife division, the introduction of caribou from other parts of the island have allowed the Grey Islands herd to rebound. Former hunter Paul Bromley hopes that the population will be sustainable enough for the hunt to be restarted.
3	"Festival of Quilts"	Jane Adey	November 5, 2023
The annual Festival of Quilts in Bay de Verde maintains a craft tradition in Conception Bay. Festival organizer Des Riggs discusses how the event came to be, and quilters like Valda AuCoin demonstrate their sewing methods before displaying their handicrafts on clotheslines.
4	"Battle Harbour (archival special)"	N/A	November 12, 2023
Re-airing of a Season 30 episode from 1995.
5	"Remembering the Mi'kmaq"	Jane Adey	November 19, 2023
Gambo middle school teacher Jo-Anne Broders, who has a passion for Newfoundland and Labrador history, hopes to show her students that history can be told from different perspectives. She and her class investigate a long-forgotten Mi'kmaq cemetery by constructing the family trees of those buried at the site. They then share their discoveries with Mi'sel Joe, leader of the Miawpukek First Nation.
6	"Seeking Salmon and Serenity"	Jane Adey	November 26, 2023
The male-dominated sport of salmon fishing has become more diverse in recent years. Fly fishing instructor Kastine Coleman leads an all-female class to the Humber River and demonstrates that technique is king (or queen) when it comes to salmon fishing.
7	"A Fabulously Folksy Festival"	Jane Adey	December 3, 2023
Mummering is still practiced each Christmas throughout rural Newfoundland and Labrador, and thanks to the annual Mummers Festival, residents of St. John's can also participate in one of the province's most hallowed traditions. Land & Sea speaks with executive festival director Lynn McShane and festival co-founder Ryan Davis on the eve of the 15th Mummers Festival.
8	"For Love and Money"	Jane Adey	December 10, 2023
In an effort to keep his family in Newfoundland, retired fisherman Rex Simmonds turned to ocean research and established RS Marine Ltd. His new state-of-the-art research vessel, the Patrick and William, is named after his two eldest grandsons.
9	"The Gathering"	Jane Adey	February 4, 2024
Every fall, the Innu residents of Sheshatshiu travel to Gull Island, Labrador for the Manishan Nui gathering where the community reconnects with traditional Innu culture. Elizabeth Penashue and Etienne Rich, chief of the Sheshatshiu Innu First Nation, believe that the event brings people closer together and helps to alleviate the community's mental health crisis.
10	"Evidence from a Disaster"	Jane Adey	February 11, 2024
The Canada Science and Technology Museum in Ottawa has acquires various artifacts and documents recovered from the royal commission on the Ocean Ranger, an offshore oil rig which sank in 1982 with the loss of all 84 hands. Museum curator Sharon Babaian hopes to reach out to the surviving families of those Newfoundlanders and Labradorians who died onboard to determine how the collection should be displayed. Noreen O'Neill, whose husband perished on the Ocean Ranger, was invited to assess the collection, and she believes it best to have the items sent to be displayed in Newfoundland.
11	"In Search of Moose (archival special)"	N/A	February 18, 2024
Re-airing of a Season 32 episode from 1997.
12	"Outdoor Dipping"	Jane Adey	February 25, 2024
A group of avid swimmers led by the "Coldwater Cowgirls" (Erin Power, Erin Barnhardt, and Kerrie Cochrane) regularly go for cold swims at George's Pond in Signal Hill, St. John's each winter.
13	"100 Years of Radio"	Jane Adey	March 3, 2024
Land & Sea celebrates the 100th anniversary of VOWR, Newfoundland's first radio station operated by the Wesley United Church in St. John's. The station continues to be run by a team of over 50 volunteers.
14	"Return to Cutthroat (archival special)"	N/A	March 10, 2024
Re-airing of a Season 32 episode from 1996.
15	"An Appeal for Seal (Part 1)"	Jane Adey	March 17, 2024
16	"An Appeal for Seal (Part 2)"	Jane Adey	March 24, 2024
International bans on seal products in the United States and the European Union have greatly hindered Newfoundland's sealing industry. Canadian Sealers Association president Eldred Woodford asserts that the seal hunt is a sustainable industry that would provide tangible economic benefits to Newfoundland and Labrador's outport communities. Businessman Dion Daikins of Dildo sees potential in the health benefits of the Omega-3 fatty acids in seal oil. Jen Shears, owner and operator of Natural Boutique in St. John's, sells sealskin products and hopes to educate the public about the regulations and ethics behind the modern seal hunt. Canadian Senator Fabian Manning has advocated for the deregulation of seal products.

=== Season 61 (2024–2025) ===
The sixty-first season of Land & Sea consists of 11 original episodes and 6 archival specials. These episodes were broadcast on Sunday mornings at 11:30 AM NT.

No. in season	Title	Host	Air date	Link
1	"Dave Quinton Remembers"	Jane Adey	October 20, 2024	Link
In celebration of the show's 60th anniversary, former Land & Sea host Dave Quinton reminisces about the program's early history and some of his favourite memories.
2	"Getting Out for Trout"	Jane Adey	October 27, 2024	Link
Land & Sea spends a day with the anglers of Howley fishing for trout in Grand Lake. Although the number of registered anglers is declining across the province, there remains an active community ranging from 82-year-old Roland Loughlin to 20-year-old Brayden Coish.
3	"Nellie Winters' Legacy"	Jane Adey	November 3, 2025	Link
Nellie Winters of Makkovik, Labrador was taught sewing and embroidery by the Moravian Church, and she became locally well-known for her craft store selling sealskin parkas and mittens. Her work was showcased at the 1976 Summer Olympics in Montreal. At 87, Winters no longer makes handicrafts, but her work in promoting Inuit crafts has left behind an enduring legacy.
4	"Triton (archival special)"	N/A	November 10, 2024	Link
Re-airing of a Season 15 episode from 1979.
5	"Lobster Hope"	Jane Adey	November 17, 2024	Link
Although the lobster fishermen of Fortune Bay are being somewhat secretive about it, the lobster fishery there is thriving. Alfred Fitzpatrick of Garnish explains why they've become so protective and how they leave female lobsters alone to reproduce to ensure the vitality of future lobster stocks.
6	"Sharks Reconsidered"	Jane Adey	December 1, 2024	Link
Bryan Oram of Hare Bay hosts shark fishing tours and hopes to educate tourists and fishermen alike about how they comprise a key element of the aquatic ecosystem. Bryan's father Alec Oram, originally from Bragg's Island, once feared sharks, but has come to realize that the idea of the man-hunting shark is largely a myth. The father-son duo collect data for marine scientists to study why the populations of certain shark species, like the porbeagle shark and the dogfish, have fluctuated.
7	"The Rock of Corey and Trina"	Jane Adey	December 8, 2024	Link
A rock with white paint reading "Corey + Trina '94" acts as a landmark for drivers when entering the Avalon Peninsula along the Trans-Canada Highway near the turnoff to Bellevue. While many assume it to be a tribute to the comedic musical husband-and-wife duo Corey and Trina, it had actually been painted by Winston and Krista Sharpe as a surprise for their son/brother Corey Sharpe and his then-girlfriend Trina. Land & Sea explores these stories and arranges a meeting between the various Coreys and Trinas who had always associated themselves with the well-known graffiti.
8	"Christmas at Job's Cove (archival special)"	N/A	December 29, 2024	Link
Re-airing of a Season 20 episode from 1984.
9	"Salt Water Music (archival special)"	N/A	January 5, 2025	Link
Re-airing of a Season 40 episode from 2005.
10	"The Peacemaker (archival special)"	N/A	January 26, 2025	Link
Re-airing of a Season 39 episode from 2004.
11	"Rock Climbing Rapture"	Jane Adey	February 2, 2025	Link
The rugged shores of Newfoundland and Labrador have inspired a small rock climbing community. Daniel Alocoque teaches bouldering classes at a small cliff face near Logy Bay. He discusses the friendships he has made and accomplishments he has achieved through this hobby.
12	"Farmers' Favour"	Jane Adey	February 9, 2025	Link
Since 2017, the Centre for Agricultural and Forestry Development in Wooddale has been growing vegetables in greenhouses and allowing farmers to transplant them during the summer, increasing the province's food security. Local farmer Kent Fudge enjoys being able to take advantage of a fuller growing season.
13	"We Were Rangers (archival special)"	N/A	February 16, 2025	Link
Re-airing of a Season 37 episode ("The Rangers") from 2002.
14	"Safeguarding Seabirds"	Jane Adey	February 23, 2025	Link
A group of wildlife biologists led by Bill Montevecchi have been caring for the declining populations of seabirds in the Baccalieu Island Ecological Reserve, including the endangered storm petrels.
15	"The Crab Fishery of Mary's Harbour (archival special)"	N/A	March 2, 2025	Link
Re-airing of a Season 30 episode from 1995.
16	"Memories from the Road"	Jane Adey	March 9, 2025	Link
Former Land & Sea host Pauline Thornhill discusses her memories of working on the program while at her home in Bay L'Argent. Guitarist Sandy Morris of the Wonderful Grand Band, who has arranged Land & Sea's music for over 30 years, talks about how the audience has a special connection with the show's opening and closing themes.
17	"Home for Hockey"	Jane Adey	March 16, 2025	Link
In Isle aux Morts, Vic Lawrence has hosted and organized the Isle aux Morts Winter Classic hockey tournament for the past 10 years. As not every kid in the town could procure ice skates, they instead agreed to play "boot hockey" to give more people the chance to compete. The annual event continues to expand and brings life to the quiet town.

=== Season 62 (2025–2026) ===
The sixty-second season of Land & Sea consists of 12 original episodes and 3 archival specials. These episodes were broadcast on Sunday mornings at 11:30 AM NT.

No. in season	Title	Host	Air date	Link
1	"Comeback Cod"	Jane Adey	October 26, 2025	Link
After decades of relying on the snow crab fishery, the fishermen of Mary's Harbour, Labrador have started fishing for Atlantic cod again. Alton Rumbolt, a Mary's Harbour resident, is optimistic about the comeback of the provincial cod fishery. The Labrador Fishermen's Union Shrimp Company, a facility built with the help of an Icelandic firm, exports millions of pounds of Atlantic cod, and also manufactures cod tongues, a local delicacy.
2	"Flat Bay Eel Spearing"	Jane Adey	November 2, 2025	Link
Land & Sea visits Flat Bay to document the winter American eel spear fishery. Mi'kmaq elder Calvin White takes the crew to the eel fishing spot at Muddy Hole and discusses how the eels had brought the Mi'kmaq to the area centuries ago. Because it is an endangered species, no commercial licenses have been granted for the American eel since the 1990s, and the traditional Flat Bay eel fishery is at risk of disappearing.
3	"A Logger's Life (archival special)"	N/A	November 9, 2025	N/A
Re-airing of a Season 31 episode from 1995.
4	"Townie from India"	Jane Adey	November 16, 2025	Link
Mithun Matheu from Kerala, India owns and operates Super-X, a convenience store in St. John's which makes and sells both Newfoundland cuisine, including Jiggs dinner and fish and chips, and Indian delicacies like chicken biryani. Matheu discusses how his business weathered the COVID-19 pandemic, which he attributes to the store's unique offerings and the kindness of his staff.
5	"Rural Boat Builders"	Jane Adey	November 23, 2025	Link
Land & Sea assesses the local boat building industry by visiting four boat builders in three Newfoundland communities. Brad Burt of King's Point, the owner of Green Bay Fibre Products, makes fibreglass pleasure boats; Nicole Vokey of King's Point owns Coastal Vokey and sells boats across Canada; Byron Collins of Glovertown discusses the aluminum boats made by his company FabTech Industries, which has operated for over 45 years; and Glen Meadus of Centreville, who runs Seabreeze Boats, expects continued growth for the boat building industry.
6	"The Food Fishery (archival special)"	N/A	November 30, 2025	N/A
Re-airing of a Season 35 episode from 2000.
7	"A Recitation Christmas (Part 1)"	Jane Adey	December 7, 2025	Link
8	"A Recitation Christmas (Part 2)"	Jane Adey	December 14, 2025	Link
A tradition of oral storytelling continues to be held each Christmas at Petty Harbour. Land & Sea documents some of the "yarns" spun by local performers such as Dave Paddon, Karen Ennis, and Harry Ingram.
9	"A Goose Named Gord"	Jane Adey	January 25, 2026	Link
Neil Simmons of Green's Harbour cares for his pet goose Gord Downy – named after the frontman for the Tragically Hip – who has become a sensation on Facebook and TikTok. His wife Jacqueline Simmons sews diaper jeans for their unorthodox pet.
10	"Bats on the Brink"	Jane Adey	February 1, 2026	Link
The little brown bat population of Newfoundland and Labrador have been subject to a terrible white-nose syndrome epidemic. Wildlife scientist Jessica Humber explains the role bats play in controlling insect populations and takes the crew to Salmonier Nature Park to show off some of the bat houses. Note that the 2026 Winter Olympics pre-empted Land & Sea for the rest of February 2026.
11	"The Little Morrissey Returns"	Jane Adey	March 2, 2026	Link
Arctic explorer Captain Bob Bartlett's schooner, Effie M. Morrissey (today the Ernestina Morrissey, affectionately called "The Little Morrissey"), visits her old home port of Brigus. Bartlett's greatniece Margaret Angel, daughter of his crew member and nephew Jack Angel, recounts her father's time working with Bartlett through family photos. Both Angel and Marine Institute student Tyler Simms explore the vessel and honour it as a piece of living history.
12	"Portrait of Fishermen's Broadcast (archival special)"	N/A	March 8, 2026	N/A
Re-airing of a Season 10 episode from 1975 in celebration of the The Broadcast's 75th anniversary.
13	"Tilting's Irish Festival"	Jane Adey	March 15, 2026	Link
The Fogo Island community of Tilting celebrates their Irish heritage each September with a festival called Féile Tilting. Local genealogists Jim McGrath, Cyril Burke, and John Greene, who proudly call themselves Irish Newfoundlanders, discuss the community's history and point out their immigrant ancestors at the Old Irish Cemetery. Recent Irish immigrant Nial Wall from Wexford was one of the organizers of Féile Tilting.
14	"Worried About Water"	Jane Adey	March 22, 2026	Link
Land & Sea documents some of the firefighting efforts during the summer 2025 wildfires. Amy Coady, president of Municipalities Newfoundland and Labrador, discusses the waning water resources that some rural communities, including Cormack and Hughes Brook, are experiencing during dry seasons.
15	"The Plane Crash That Saved Lives"	Jane Adey	March 29, 2026	Link
In 1945, an American B-24 Liberator plane crashed near North West River, Labrador. Although the crash took nine lives, vials of penicillin were soon discovered at a local beach, which allowed Dr. Tony Paddon to start administering pneumonia cures for the isolated residents of northern Labrador. Tony's son Dave Paddon and Stephanie Smith, one of Dr. Paddon's patients, tell the story of how a tragic plane crash saved lives.

=== Season 63 (2026–2027) ===
These episodes were broadcast on Sunday mornings at 11:00 AM NT.

No. in season	Title	Host	Air date	Link
1	"A Story of Capelin"	Jane Adey	October 25, 2026	Link
Recent assessments have indicated that capelin stocks have begun rebounding. Aquatic biologist Ron Lewis discusses the capelin's biology and the impacts their stocks have on provincial fisheries while watching them spawn in Topsail Beach and Bellevue Beach. Fisherman Ivan Batten of Port de Grave emphasises how much of his livelihood depends upon the accuracy of the estimates done by Fisheries and Oceans Canada.
2	"Wreck of the Anglo Saxon (Part 1)"	Jane Adey	November 1, 2026	Link
3	"Wreck of the Anglo Saxon (Part 2)"	Jane Adey	November 8, 2026	Link
Land & Sea highlights the local efforts to commemorate the 1863 shipwreck of the SS Anglo Saxon (1856) at Cape Race, which saw the greatest loss of life of any shipwreck on the coasts of Newfoundland and Labrador.
4	"Sled Dogs (archival special)"	N/A	November 15, 2026	N/A
Re-airing of a Season 32 episode from 1996.
