= List of shipwrecks in November 1841 =

List of shipwrecks in November 1841 includes ships sunk, foundered, wrecked, grounded, or otherwise lost during November 1841.

== 1 November ==
List of shipwrecks: 1 November 1841
Ship	State	Description
Aimable Victorine	France	The ship was sighted in the Øresund whilst on a voyage from Danzig to Brest, Finistère. No further trace, presumed foundered with the loss of all hands.
Bently	United Kingdom	The ship was driven ashore and severely damaged at Maryport, Cumberland. She was on a voyage from Belfast, County Antrim to Maryport. Bently was refloated and taken into Maryport.
Providentia	France	The ship departed from Newcastle upon Tyne, Northumberland, United Kingdom for Marseille, Bouches-du-Rhône. No further trace, presumed foundered with the loss of all hands.
Susan Ann	(United Kingdom of Great Britain and Ireland) British North America	The ship was driven ashore in Pownell Bay, Prince Edward Island.

== 2 November ==
List of shipwrecks: 2 November 1841
Ship	State	Description
Bolivar	Denmark	The ship was driven ashore at Køge.
Jewess	(United Kingdom of Great Britain and Ireland) New South Wales	The ship was driven ashore on Banks Peninsula.
Kent	United Kingdom	The ship was wrecked on Fårö, Sweden. She was on a voyage from Saint Petersburg, Russia to London.
Speculator	(United Kingdom of Great Britain and Ireland) New South Wales	The ship was driven ashore on Banks Peninsula.
Thetis	Denmark	The ship was wrecked at Narva, Russia. Her crew were rescued.
Speculator	(United Kingdom of Great Britain and Ireland) New South Wales	The ship was driven ashore on Banks Peninsula.
Victoria	United Kingdom	The schooner was wrecked in the Magdalen Islands, Nova Scotia, British North America. Her crew were rescued. She was on a voyage from Quebec City, Province of Canada, British North America to Bathurst, Gambia Colony and Protectorate.

== 3 November ==
List of shipwrecks: 3 November 1841
Ship	State	Description
Craig Elachie	United Kingdom	The ship was driven ashore in the Strangford Lough. She was on a voyage from Bristol, Gloucestershire to Strangford, County Antrim. Craig Elachie was refloated on 5 November and taken into Strangford.

== 4 November ==
List of shipwrecks: 4 November 1841
Ship	State	Description
Bee	United Kingdom	The sloop ran aground on the Hook Sand, in the Solent. She was refloated on 7 November and taken into Poole, Dorset.
Eddystone	United Kingdom	The ship ran aground on St. Thomas's Shoal. She was on a voyage from London to Quebec City, Province of Canada, British North America. Eddystone was refloated and sailed to Quebec City, where she arrived on 14 November.
Five Brothers	United Kingdom	The brig was wrecked on the Gaa Sand, in the North Sea off the coast of Forfarshire. Her crew survived. She was on a voyage from Newcastle upon Tyne, Northumberland to Perth.

== 5 November ==
List of shipwrecks: 5 November 1841
Ship	State	Description
Herald	United Kingdom	The ship was driven ashore and wrecked at Point Escuminac, New Brunswick, British North America. Her crew were rescued. She was on a voyage from Liverpool, Lancashire to Miramichi, New Brunswick.
Regina	(United Kingdom of Great Britain and Ireland) New Zealand	The ship was wrecked at New Plymouth, New Zealand. She had arrived from Port Nicholson and was unloading cargo when a heavy gale blew up. The ship's master took her out of port for safety, but she was blown onto rocks. All the crew were saved.

== 6 November ==
List of shipwrecks: 6 November 1841
Ship	State	Description
Brilliante	Brazil	The ship was wrecked in the Bay of Cuma. She was on a voyage from Maranhão to Puerto Rico and Barbados.
Columbus	Sweden	The ship foundered in the North Sea 6 leagues (18 nautical miles (33 km)) off Lindesnes, Norway. Her crew survived. She was on a voyage from Hartlepool, County Durham, United Kingdom to Karlskrona.
Flotte	France	The ship was wrecked on the Ilcades Rocks off the coast of Vendée. Her crew were rescued.
Galen	United Kingdom	The ship was abandoned in the Atlantic Ocean off Faial Island, Azores. All on board were rescued by Vespasian (United Kingdom). Galen was on a voyage from Waterford to Boston, Massachusetts, United States.
Lamb	United Kingdom	The ship ran aground on the Thorpe Rocks, in the North Sea off the coast of Suffolk. She was refloated.
Rowena	United Kingdom	The barque was abandoned in the Atlantic Ocean. Five crew in a longboat were rescued on 15 November by Sir George Provost (United Kingdom). Rowena was on a voyage from Quebec City, Province of Canada, British North America to Cork. She was driven ashore on Anticosti Island, Province of Canada.

== 7 November ==
List of shipwrecks: 7 November 1841
Ship	State	Description
Amelia	United Kingdom	The ship ran aground on the Foreness Rock, off Margate, Kent. She was on a voyage from Gijón, Spain to London.
Leven Lass	United Kingdom	The ship was driven ashore at Wells-next-the-Sea, Norfolk. She was on a voyage from South Shields, County Durham to Livorno, Grand Duchy of Tuscany. Level Lass was refloated and resumed her voyage.

== 8 November ==
List of shipwrecks: 8 November 1841
Ship	State	Description
Auguste and Bertha	United Kingdom	The ship was driven ashore at Pillau, Prussia, where she was wrecked on 11 December. She was on a voyage from Hartlepool, County Durham to Pillau.
Breakwater	United Kingdom	The ship ran aground on the Scroby Sands, Norfolk. She was refloated the next day.
Dido	United Kingdom	The brig was driven ashore and wrecked near Rønne, Denmark. Her crew were rescued. She was on a voyage from Hull, Yorkshire to Riga, Russia.
Harriet	United Kingdom	The ship was driven ashore at Horsey, Norfolk.
Joseph Storey	United Kingdom	The ship was driven ashore on Anholt, Denmark. She was on a voyage from London to Saint Petersburg, Russia. She was later refloated and put into Copenhagen, Denmark for repairs.
Newham	United Kingdom	The brig ran aground on the Cross Sand, in the North Sea off the coast of Norfolk. She was later refloated and anchored off Great Yarmouth.
Speculation	United Kingdom	The schooner was wrecked at St. Peter's, Nova Scotia, British North America.

== 9 November ==
List of shipwrecks: 9 November 1841
Ship	State	Description
Belle	United Kingdom	The ship was wrecked on the Lighthouse Reef. Her crew were rescued. She was on a voyage from Saint Kitts to Belize City, British Honduras.
Brandenbourg	LübeckUnited Kingdom	The ship was driven ashore near "Bassemark". Her crew were rescued. She was on avoyage from Amsterdam, North Holland, Netherlands to Lübeck.
City of Edinburgh	United Kingdom	The ship was abandoned in the Atlantic Ocean 600 nautical miles (1,100 km) west of the Isles of Scilly. Her crew were rescued by Charles (United Kingdom). City of Edinburgh was on a voyage from Quebec City, Province of Canada, British North America to London.
Lucilia	Portugal	The ship was driven ashore and wrecked on Rügen, Duchy of Holstein. Her crew were rescued. She was on a voyage from Saint Petersburg, Russia to Porto.
Queen	United Kingdom	The ship was wrecked on the Guinea Rock, off Seal Island, Nova Scotia, British North America. She was on a voyage from Liverpool, Lancashire to Saint John, New Brunswick, British North America.
Sisters	United Kingdom	The ship ran aground on the Barber Sand, in the North Sea off the coast of Norfolk. She was refloated.
Susanna	United Kingdom	The ship was wrecked off West Cape, Prince Edward Island. She was on a voyage from Buctouche, New Brunswick, British North America to Teignmouth, Devon.

== 10 November ==
List of shipwrecks: 10 November 1841
Ship	State	Description
Amelia	United Kingdom	The ship ran aground on the Gunfleet Sand, in the North Sea off the coast of Essex. She was on a voyage from Danzig to London. Amelia was refloated on 12 November with assistance from the smack Atalanta (United Kingdom).
Athen	Bremen	The ship ran aground on the Pagen Sand, in the North Sea.
Canning	United Kingdom	The schooner was driven ashore and wrecked on "Hollands Wadero". Her crew were rescued. She was on a voyage from Newcastle upon Tyne, Northumberland to Malmö, Sweden.
Crescent	United Kingdom	The ship was driven ashore near Rønne, Denmark. Her crew were rescued. She was on a voyage from Copenhagen, Denmark to Memel, Prussia.
Fara Sulner	Norway	The ship ran aground off Ouessant, Finistère, France and was abandoned. She was on a voyage from St. Ubes, Portugal to Christiansand. Fara Sulna was refloated and taken into Le Conquet, Finistère.
Hermine	Stettin	The ship was driven ashore near Liseleje, Zealand, Denmark. She was on a voyage from Liverpool, Lancashire, United Kingdom to Stettin.
Indian	Sweden	The barque ran aground on the Scroby Sands, Norfolk, United Kingdom. She was on a voyage from Gävle to Gibraltar. Indian was refloated the next day.
Oswald	Sweden	The ship was driven ashore at Helsingborg.
Paquete Juanita	Venezuela	The ship sprang a leak and foundered 10 leagues (30 nautical miles (56 km)) off Porto Caballo with the loss of eleven of the 21 people on board. She was on a voyage from Porto Caballo to La Guaira.
Perseverance	Belgium	The ship departed from St Ubes, Portugal for Antwerp. No further trace, presumed foundered with the lossof all hands.
Soderhafet	Russia	The ship was wrecked at Narva. Her crew were rescued. She was on a voyage from Saint Petersburg to Dunkirk, Nord.
Sophe	Hamburg	The ship ran aground on the Pagen Sand.
St. Peter	United Kingdom	The ship was wrecked 5 nautical miles (9.3 km) north of Aberdyfi, Merionethshire. She was on a voyage from Youghal, County Cork to Liverpool, Lancashire.

== 11 November ==
List of shipwrecks: 11 November 1841
Ship	State	Description
Dorchester	United Kingdom	The ship ran aground off Cape St. John, Newfoundland, British North America. She was later refloated and resumed her voyage.
Emelia	Danzig	The ship ran aground on the Gunfleet Sand, in the North Sea off the coast of Essex, United Kingdom. She was on a voyage from Danzig to London, United Kingdom. Emelia was refloated and resumed her voyage.
Mountaineer	United Kingdom	The full-rigged ship was wrecked at Llandwyn Point, Caernarfonshire. All sixteen people on board were rescued by the lifeboat № 5 (United Kingdom).
Orvarud	Norway	The ship collided with an English brig in the Norwegian Sea 50 nautical miles (93 km) north of Bergen. She was abandoned on 16 December in the North Sea 100 nautical miles (190 km) south of Bergen. She was on a voyage from Amsterdam, North Holland, Netherlands to Trondheim.
Rover	(United Kingdom of Great Britain and Ireland) New South Wales	The schooner was wrecked at Bronte with the loss of twelve lives. She was on a voyage from Sydney to Port Phillip, South Australia.

== 12 November ==
List of shipwrecks: 12 November 1841
Ship	State	Description
Commerce	United Kingdom	The galiot was wrecked on the Banjaard Sand, in the North Sea off the coast of Zeeland, Netherlands. Her crew were rescued. She was on a voyage from London to Rotterdam, South Holland, Netherlands.
Diligence	United Kingdom	The ship ran aground on Lessal Point, Sweden. She was later refloated and put into "Kinso".
Eliza Chase	United States	The ship collided with Ionia (United States) and was abandoned in the Atlantic Ocean. She was on a voyage from Havre de Grâce, Seine-Inférieure, France to New Bedford, Massachusetts.
Fredericks Haab	Denmark	The ship was wrecked at Helsinki, Grand Duchy of Finland. Her crew were rescued.
Globe	United Kingdom	The ship was wrecked off Seal Island, Nova Scotia, British North America. Her crew were rescued. She was on a voyage from Liverpool, Lancashire to Saint John, New Brunswick, British North America.
Indian	Sweden	The ship was driven ashore at Gorleston, Suffolk. She was on a voyage from Gävle, Sweden to Gibraltar.
Iris	United Kingdom	The ship departed from Hartlepool, County Durham for King's Lynn, Norfolk. No further trace, presumed foundered with the loss of all hands. She may have foundered off Flamborough Head, Yorkshire.
Jolly Tar	(United Kingdom of Great Britain and Ireland) Jersey	The ship was wrecked on the south coast of Cuba. All on board were rescued. She was on a voyage from London to Texas.
Laura	France	The ship was driven ashore at Dunkirk, Nord. She was on a voyage from Dunkirk to a Norwegian port.
Melona	United Kingdom	The ship ran aground on the Gunfleet Sand, in the North Sea off the coast of Essex. She was on a voyage from South Shields, County Durham to London. Melona was refloated and resumed her voyage.
Mentor	United Kingdom	The ship was wrecked on Fotö, Sweden. Her crew were rescued. She was on a voyage from Newport, Monmouthshire to Stettin.
Nuevo Angel de la Guarda	Spain	The ship was driven ashore at Saltfleet, Lincolnshire, United Kingdom. She was on a voyage from London, United Kingdom to Bremen. Nuevo Angel de la Guarda was refloated on 1 December and taken into Hull, Yorkshire.
Unity	United Kingdom	The brig foundered in the North Sea 50 nautical miles (93 km) off Whitby, Yorkshire. Her crew were rescued by Clio ( Sweden). She was on a voyage from Stettin to Dundee, Forfarshire.
Victoria	United Kingdom	The ship was run down and sunk in the Bay of Gaspé by Bolton Abbey (United Kingdom). All on board were rescued. She was on a voyage from Prince Edward Island, British North America to Campbeltown, Argyllshire.

== 13 November ==
List of shipwrecks: 13 November 1841
Ship	State	Description
Continuation	Prussia	The schooner ran aground on the Herd Sand, in the North Sea off the coast of County Durham, United Kingdom. Her crew were rescued by the lifeboat Northumberland (United Kingdom). Continuation was refloated on 21 November and taken into South Shields, County Durham.
Elizabeth & Ann	United Kingdom	The ship ran aground on the Scroby Sands, Norfolk. She was later refloated.
Fredericks Haab	Denmark	The ship was wrecked near Helsingborg, Sweden. Her crew were rescued.
Lauen	Norway	The ship was driven ashore at Dunkirk, Nord, France. She was on a voyage from Dunkirk to Porsgrund. Lauen was refloated on 29 November and taken into Dunkirk.
San José	Spain	The ship was driven ashore and damaged at St. Mary's, Isles of Scilly, United Kingdom.
Union	United Kingdom	The schooner was abandoned in the Atlantic Ocean.Her crew were rescued by Josephine (United Kingdom). Union was on a voyage from Liverpool, Nova Scotia, British North America to Maryport, Cumberland.

== 14 November ==
List of shipwrecks: 14 November 1841
Ship	State	Description
Aboyne	United Kingdom	The ship was driven ashore and wrecked between Hartlepool and Seaton Carew, County Durham. Her crew were rescued by the Hartlepool Lifeboat and/or Seaton Carew Lifeboat. She was on a voyage from Stockton-on-Tees, County Durham to London.
Agostina	Grand Duchy of Tuscany	The ship was driven ashore and wrecked at Livorno with the loss of all but one of her crew.
Ariel	United Kingdom	The ship was driven ashore and severely damaged between Hartlepool and Seaton Carew. Her crew were rescued by the Hartlepool Lifeboat and/or Seaton Carew Lifeboat.
Albatross	United Kingdom	The ship was driven ashore and severely damaged between Hartlepool and Seaton Carew. Her crew were rescued by the Hartlepool Lifeboat and/or Seaton Carew Lifeboat. She was later refloated.
Buckingham	United Kingdom	The ship was wrecked on the Barnard Sand, in the North Sea off the coast of Suffolk with the loss of all hands.
Carlos Habañero	Spain	The ship was driven ashore in the "Hever". She was on a voyage from Málaga to Hamburg. Carlos Habañero was refloated on 16 November and taken into Husum, Duchy of Holstein.
Christian VIII	Denmark	The ship was wrecked on the Steilsand, in the North Sea.
Elizabeth	United Kingdom	The ship was driven ashore and wrecked between Hartlepool and Seaton Carew. Her crew were rescued by the Hartlepool Lifeboat and/or Seaton Carew Lifeboat.
Emilie	France	The sloop was driven ashore and wrecked at Reighton, Yorkshire, United Kingdom with the loss of her captain.
Endeavour	United Kingdom	The ship was driven ashore at Lowestoft, Suffolk.
Erin	United Kingdom	The ship was wrecked south of Great Yarmouth, Norfolk. Her crew were rescued. She was on a voyage from London to Hartley, Northumberland.
Exchange	United Kingdom	The ship was driven ashore and wrecked between Hartlepool and Seaton Carew. Her crew were rescued by the Hartlepool Lifeboat and/or Seaton Carew Lifeboat.
Exile	United Kingdom	The ship ran aground near Ancona, Papal States. She was later refloated and taken into Ancona.
Garland	United Kingdom	The ship was driven ashore between Hartlepool and Seaton Carew. Her crew were rescued by the Hartlepool Lifeboat and/or Seaton Carew Lifeboat.
Gratitude	United Kingdom	The brig was driven ashore and wrecked at Cley-next-the-Sea, Norfolk. Her crew were rescued.
Hartford	United Kingdom	The ship was driven ashore between Hartlepool and Seaton Carew.
Henrietta	Stettin	The ship was driven ashore near Kastrup, Denmark. She was on a voyage from Stettin to Bordeaux, Gironde, France. Henrietta was refloated and taken into Copenhagen, Denmark.
Hope	United Kingdom	The ship was driven ashore at Covehithe, Suffolk. Her crew were rescued.
Iris	United Kingdom	The brig foundered in the North Sea off Flamborough Head, Yorkshire.
Jane	United Kingdom	The ship was abandoned in the North Sea off the coast of Lincolnshire. Her crew were rescued. She was on a voyage from Wisbech, Cambridgeshire to Goole, Yorkshire. Jane subsequently came ashore at Heacham, Norfolk on 19 November.
John and Anna	United Kingdom	The ship was driven ashore at Lowestoft.
Kate and Jane	United Kingdom	The sloop was driven ashore and wrecked at Wainfleet, Lincolnshire. Her crew were rescued. She was on a voyage from Goole to London.
Lochiel	United Kingdom	The sloop was driven ashore and wrecked between Hartlepool and Seaton Carew.
Madelaine Cherie	France	The chasse-marée was wrecked on the Burrows Sand, in the North Sea off the coast of Essex, United Kingdom. Her crew were rescued by the smack Prosperous (United Kingdom). Madelaine Cherie was on a voyage from Sunderland, County Durham to Nantes, Loire-Inférieure.
Miriam	United Kingdom	The brig was driven ashore and severely damaged at Whitby, Yorkshire. Her crew were rescued by the Whitby Lifeboat. She was on a voyage from Portsmouth, Hampshire to Sunderland. Miriam was refloated on 2 December and taken into Whitby.
Neptune	United Kingdom	The ship was driven ashore and wrecked at King's Lynn, Norfolk.
Oporto Packet	United Kingdom	The ship was driven ashore and wrecked at Theddlethorpe, Lincolnshire.
Pheasant	United Kingdom	The brig was driven ashore and wrecked at Havre de Grâce, Seine-Inférieure, France with the loss of two of her six crew. She was on a voyage from Sunderland to Rouen, Seine-Inférieure.
Reindeer	United Kingdom	The ship was driven ashore between Hartlepool and Seaton Carew.
Sisters	United Kingdom	The ship was driven ashore and wrecked at Theddlethorpe.
Shannon	United Kingdom	The ship was driven ashore and severely damaged at Hartlepool. She was refloated on 26 November and towed into Sunderland.
Susannah	United Kingdom	The brig was driven ashore and wrecked at Coatham, Yorkshire with the loss of all eleven crew. The ship's dog survived. She was on a voyage from Stockton-on-Tees, County Durham to London.
Thomas and Mary	United Kingdom	The ship foundered in the North Sea off the Dudgeon Lightship ( Trinity House). Her crew were rescued.
Three Sisters	United Kingdom	The ship was driven ashore and wrecked at Theddlethorpe.
Unite	United Kingdom	The ship was driven ashore at Scarborough, Yorkshire.
Unity	United Kingdom	The ship was driven ashore in Filey Bay.
William	United Kingdom	The schooner was driven ashore between Hartlepool and Seaton Carew. Her crew were rescued by the Hartlepool Lifeboat and/or Seaton Carew Lifeboat.
Zeuxide	France	The ship was driven ashore and wrecked 5 nautical miles (9.3 km) west of Calais. She was on a voyage from Saint Petersburg, Russia to Havre de Grâce, Seine-Inférieure.

== 15 November ==
List of shipwrecks: 15 November 1841
Ship	State	Description
Aboyne	United Kingdom	The ship was driven ashore and wrecked at Hartlepool, County Durham. She was on a voyage from Stockton-on-Tees, County Durham to London.
Alfred	United Kingdom	The brig ran aground on the Galloper Sand, in the North Sea off the coast of Essex. She was refloated and then driven ashore at Reculver, Kent. Alfred was refloated and taken into Margate, Kent. She was on a voyage from Youghal, County Cork to London.
Ariadne	United Kingdom	The brig was driven ashore at North Somercotes, Lincolnshire. She was refloated on 1 December.
British Queen	United Kingdom	The brig was driven ashore at North Somercotes. She was on a voyage from King's Lynn, Norfolk to Sunderland, County Durham. She was refloated on 28 November and taken into Grimsby, Lincolnshire.
Caroline	United Kingdom	The brig was driven ashore at North Somercotes. She was refloated on 30 November but was driven ashore again near Grimsby. Caroline was again refloated.
Christian	Netherlands	The ship was wrecked on the Steilsand.
Duke of Wellington	United Kingdom	The ship was driven ashore at Milford Haven, Pembrokeshire. She was on a voyage from Málaga, Spain to Liverpool, Lancashire. Duke of Wellington was later refloated.
Eliza	United Kingdom	The ship was driven ashore at North Somercotes.
Emma	United Kingdom	The brig was driven ashore and wrecked at North Somercotes. She was on a voyage from Southampton, Hampshire to Whitby, Yorkshire
Enigheten	Sweden	The ship ran aground and sank off "Boko". Her crew were rescued. She was on a voyage from Trelleborg to Höganäs.
Ettore	Grand Duchy of Tuscany	The ship collided with Abo ( Grand Duchy of Tuscany) at Livorno and was left in a sinking condition.
Express	United Kingdom	The ship was wrecked on Baltrum, Kingdom of Hanover. Her crew were rescued. She was on a voyage from Bremen to Hull, Yorkshire.
Frau Annegiena	Prussia	The ship was wrecked on Baltrum. Her crew were rescued. She was on a voyage from Königsberg to Amsterdam, North Holland, Netherlands.
Ganges	United Kingdom	The brig was driven ashore at Sunderland. She was on a voyage from London to Sunderland. Ganges was refloated on 27 November and taken into Sunderland.
George Guildford	United Kingdom	The ship was driven ashore on Kotlin Island, Russia by ice. She was refloated on 17 November.
John	United Kingdom	The ship was driven ashore and wrecked on the north east point of Gotland, Sweden. Her crew were rescued. She was on a voyage from Saint Petersburg, Russia to London.
John	United Kingdom	The ship was driven ashore at Hunstanton, Norfolk. Her crew were rescued.
Leentje	Danzig	The ship was driven ashore on Ameland, Friesland, Netherlands. Her crew were rescued. She was on a voyage from Danzig to Bordeaux, Gironde, France.
London	United Kingdom	The brig was driven ashore at Holkham, Norfolk. Her crew were rescued. She was refloated on 17 March 1842 and proceeded for Scarborough, Yorkshire for repairs.
Loon	(United Kingdom of Great Britain and Ireland) British North America	The ship was wrecked at Main-à-Dieu, Nova Scotia. Her crew were rescued. She was on a voyage from Halifax to Sydney, Nova Scotia.
Mariners	United Kingdom	The ship was wrecked at "Lydden Spout", Kent.
Mary	United Kingdom	The ship sank at Brest, Finistère, France. Her crew were rescued. She was on a voyage from Livorno, Grand Duchy of Tuscany to Liverpool.
Mary and Margaret	United Kingdom	The ship was driven ashore at Thornham, Norfolk. Her crew were rescued.
Planter	United Kingdom	The brig was driven ashore at North Somercotes. She was refloated on 30 November and taken into Grimsby.
Provincië Overyssel	Netherlands	The ship was driven ashore on the south coast of Texel, North Holland.
Siestkiner	Netherlands	The ship was driven ashore and wrecked on Norderney, Kingdom of Hanover with the loss of her captain. She was on a voyage from Riga, Russia to Groningen.
Soon	(United Kingdom of Great Britain and Ireland) British North America	The ship was wrecked at "Manadieu". She was on a voyage from Halifax to Sydney, Nova Scotia.
Thetis	United Kingdom	The ship foundered in the North Sea off the coast of Suffolk. Her crew were rescued.
Tello	Bremen	The ship was wrecked on Baltrum. Her crew were rescued. She was on a voyage from Bremerhaven to Pernambuco, Brazil.
Two Brothers	United Kingdom	The brig was driven ashore and wrecked at North Somercotes.
Unicorn	United Kingdom	The ship was driven ashore and wrecked at Aberdaron, Caernarfonshire. She was on a voyage from Dublin to Rhyl, Flintshire.
Violet	United Kingdom	The ship foundered in the North Sea east of "Horumersiel". Her crew were rescued. She was on a voyage from Newcastle upon Tyne, Northumberland to Hamburg.

== 16 November ==
List of shipwrecks: 16 November 1841
Ship	State	Description
Ann Eliza	United Kingdom	The ship was driven ashore at Lymington, Hampshire. She was on a voyage from London to Bridgwater, Somerset.
Buckingham	United Kingdom	The ship foundered in the North Sea off the coast of Suffolk. She was on a voyage from Saint Petersburg, Russia to London.
Derwent	United Kingdom	The ship was driven ashore on Wrangel's Island, Russia. She was on a voyage from Saint Petersburg to London.
Enigheten	Sweden	The ship struck rocks and foundered off Fotö. Her crew were rescued.
Everthorpe	United Kingdom	The ship was driven ashore and wrecked on the south coast of Bornholm. Her crew were rescued. She was on a voyage from Danzig to London.
Iron Duke	United Kingdom	The ship was beached at Great Yarmouth, Norfolk. She was on a voyage from Saint Petersburg to London.
Jeune Mathilde	France	The ship was driven ashore and wrecked at Fiume, Austrian Empire. Her crew were rescued.
John	United Kingdom	The brig was abandoned in the North Sea. She was subsequently driven ashore at "Schawven", Belgium.
Maria	United Kingdom	The ship was wrecked off Arendal, Norway. She was oh a voyage from London to Gothenburg, Sweden.
Mary	United Kingdom	The ship sank off Brest, Finistère, France. Her crew were rescued. She was on a voyage from Livorno, Grand Duchy of Tuscany to Liverpool, Lancashire.
Ninus	United Kingdom	The ship was driven ashore at St Nicholas-at-Wade, Kent. She was on a voyage from Galway to London. Ninus was refloated and taken into Whitstable, Kent.
Pollock	United Kingdom	The barque was driven ashore on Colonsay, Inner Hebrides.
Sarah	United Kingdom	The ship was abandoned in the Bristol Channel off Lundy Island, Devon. Her crew were rescued. She was on a voyage from Newport, Monmouthshire to Falmouth, Cornwall.
Swallow	United Kingdom	The ship was driven ashore at Great Yarmouth.
Syv Sodskene	Sweden	The ship sprang a leak and was beached at "Noo", Denmark. She was on a voyage from Gothenburg to Saint-Malo, Ille-et-Vilaine, France.
Zephyrus	United Kingdom	The ship was driven ashore at Great Yarmouth. She was refloated on 1 December and taken into Great Yarmouth.

== 17 November ==
List of shipwrecks: 17 November 1841
Ship	State	Description
Ann	United States	The ship was abandoned in the Atlantic Ocean. Her crew were rescued. She was on a voyage from Liverpool, New York to Barbados.
Atlas	United Kingdom	The ship sprang a leak in the English Channel and was abandoned off Fécamp, Seine-Inférieure, France. She was on a voyage from Honfleur, Calvados, France to South Shields, County Durham.
Betsey	United Kingdom	The ship was holed by her anchor and sank at Plymouth, Devon.
Delphin	Sweden	The ship was driven ashore and wrecked near Zoutelande, Zeeland, Netherlands. She was on a voyage from Gamla Carleby to Antwerp, Belgium.
Harmony	United Kingdom	The ship ran aground on the Maplin Sand, in the North Sea off the coast of Essex.
Paley	United Kingdom	The ship was abandoned in the North Sea. Her crew were rescued. She was on a voyage from Sunderland, County Durham to Rotterdam, South Holland, Netherlands.
Queen	(United Kingdom of Great Britain and Ireland) Guernsey	The ship sank on the Spaniard Sand, in the North Sea off Sheerness, Kent. Her crew were rescued. She was later refloated and taken into Whitstable, Kent, where she arrived on 28 November
Sisters	United Kingdom	The ship was driven through Ryde Pier, Isle of Wight and damaged.
Unicorn	United Kingdom	The ship was wrecked near Aberdaron, Caernarfonshire. Her crew were rescued. She was on a voyage from Dublin to Rhyl, Flintshire.

== 18 November ==
List of shipwrecks: 18 November 1841
Ship	State	Description
Ann	United Kingdom	The sloop was driven ashore 1 nautical mile (1.9 km) south of the Orfordness Lighthouse, Suffolk. Her crew were rescued. She was on a voyage from Goole, Yorkshire to London.
Appearance	United Kingdom	The ship was driven ashore in the Dardanelles. She was on a voyage from Odesa to London. Appearance was refloated and taken into "Tschardaks", Ottoman Empire for repairs.
Banffshire	United Kingdom	The ship was wrecked in the Saint Lawrence River with the loss of four of her crew. She was on a voyage from Quebec City, Province of Canada, British North America to Liverpool, Lancashire. She was later refloated and taken into Quebec City, where she arrived on 17 August 1842.
Blossom	United Kingdom	The schooner was driven ashore at Newbiggin-by-the-Sea, Northumberland. She was later refloated with the aid of two cobles and put into South Shields, County Durham. Blossom was on a voyage from Stroud to Hull, Yorkshire.
Burgomaster Jennesen	Belgium	The ship was driven ashore in the Scheldt near Antwerp. She was refloated.
Corrière de Malta	France	The ship was driven ashore on Terschelling, Friesland, Netherlands.
Criterion	United Kingdom	The ship departed from Marseille, Bouches-du-Rhône, France for Hull. No further trace, presumed foundered with the loss of all hands.
Eden	United Kingdom	The ship was driven ashore at Poole, Dorset. She was on a voyage from Newcastle upon Tyne, Northumberland to Poole.
Elizabeth and Ann	United Kingdom	The ship was driven ashore at Southwold, Suffolk. She was on a voyage from Wisbech, Cambridgeshire to London. She was refloated on 20 November and taken into Southwold.
Hope	United Kingdom	The ship was driven ashore and wrecked 7 nautical miles (13 km) south of Southwold. Her crew were rescued. She was on a voyage from Goole to London.
Infant Hercules	(United Kingdom of Great Britain and Ireland) Jamaica	The cutter was wrecked in Buff Bay.
Liberty	United Kingdom	The ship was driven ashore at Cowes, Isle of Wight. She was on a voyage from Littlehampton, Sussex to Swanage, Dorset.
Marian	United Kingdom	The ship was driven ashore 4 nautical miles (7.4 km) north of Southwold, Suffolk. Her crew were rescued. She was on a voyage from Spalding, Lincolnshire to London.
Miramichi	United Kingdom	The ship was wrecked in the Saint Lawrence River. Her crew were rescued. She was on a voyage from Quebec City to Liverpool.
Renown	United Kingdom	The ship was run down and sunk by a brig in the Atlantic Ocean. Her eleven crew took to the longboat and were subsequently rescued by Mary Jane (United Kingdom). Renown was on a voyage from Liverpool to Ancona, Papal States. The brig was believed to have also foundered with the loss of allhands.

== 19 November ==
List of shipwrecks: 19 November 1841
Ship	State	Description
Atlas	United Kingdom	The brig was abandoned in the English Channel. Her crew were rescued by the sloop Saint Leonard (United Kingdom). Atlas was on a voyage from Honfleur, Manche, France to South Shields, County Durham.
Doubtful	United Kingdom	The ship was driven ashore at Hartlepool, County Durham. She was on a voyage from Portsmouth, Hampshire to Hartlepool.
Electra	United Kingdom	The ship was driven ashore in Sinclair's Bay. She was on a voyage from Riga, Russia to Belfast, County Antrim. Electra was refloated and put into Stromness, Orkney Islands for repairs.
Elizabeth & Ann	United Kingdom	The ship was driven ashore at Southwold, Suffolk. She was on a voyage from Wisbech, Cambridgeshire to London. She was refloated the next day and taken into Southwold, where she was repaired.
Fortuna	Grand Duchy of Oldenburg	The ship was abandoned off Borkum and sank. Her crew were rescued. She was on a voyage from Cockenzie, Lothian, United Kingdom to Elsfleth.
Friends	United Kingdom	The ship was driven ashore at Lowestoft, Suffolk. She was refloated on 21 November.
Harmony	Netherlands	The ship was driven ashore near Petten, South Holland. Her crew were rescued. She was on a voyage from the Coppename River, Surinam to Amsterdam, North Holland.
Helena Jacoba	Netherlands	The ship was driven ashore on Texel, North Holland. She was on a voyage from Grangemouth, Stirlingshire, United Kingdom to Dordrecht, South Holland.
Hippogriff	United Kingdom	The ship was driven ashore and wrecked at Great Yarmouth, Norfolk. Her crew were rescued.
Integrity	United Kingdom	The ship was driven ashore at Lowestoft She was refloated on 23 November and taken into Lowestoft.
Jantina	Wismar	The ship was driven ashore near Nes, Ameland, Friesland, Netherlands with the loss of a crew member. She was on a voyage from Wismar to Aberdeen, United Kingdom.
Mary and Betsey	United Kingdom	The ship capsized off Scarborough, Yorkshire with the loss of all hands. She was on a voyage from Boston, Lincolnshire to Scarborough.
Mary Ann	United Kingdom	The ship was driven ashore north of Southwold.
Prosper	France	The chasse-marée was wrecked on the Burrows Sand, in the North Sea off the coast of Essex. Her crew were rescued. She was on a voyage from Newcastle upon Tyne, Northumberland, United Kingdom to Libourne, Gironde.
Royal William	United Kingdom	The ship ran aground on the Nore. She was refloated on 19 November.
Vrow Antina	Netherlands	The ship sprang a leak and put into Delfzijl, Groningen, where she sank. She was on a voyage from Königsberg, Prussia to Amsterdam, North Holland.

== 20 November ==
List of shipwrecks: 20 November 1841
Ship	State	Description
Anne	United Kingdom	The ship was wrecked in Bonmahon Bay.
Atlas	United Kingdom	The ship was driven ashore and sank at "Logan's Point". She was on a voyage from Boston, Massachusetts, to Pictou, Nova Scotia, British North America.
Betsey	United Kingdom	The ship was driven ashore at Helsingør, Denmark. She was on a voyage from Pillau, Prussia to Dundee, Forfarshire.
Caroline	United Kingdom	The ship ran aground on the Woolpack Sand, off the coast of Kent. She was on a voyage from Quebec City, Province of Canada, British North America to London. Caroline was refloated and resumed her voyage.
Facility	United Kingdom	The ship ran ashore at Sand Head, Hampshire. She was on a voyage from Liverpool, Lancashire to Gravesend, Kent. She was refloated with assistance from HMRC Sprightly ( Board of Customs) and taken into Portsmouth, Hampshire.
Laurel	(United Kingdom of Great Britain and Ireland) Jersey	The ship was discovered damaged and abandoned in the Irish Sea apparently having collided with another vessel. She was taken into Whitehaven, Cumberland.
Lavinia	United Kingdom	The ship was driven ashore at Hela, Prussia and was abandoned by her crew. She was on a voyage from Danzig to Leith, Lothian. Lavinia was refloated on 27 November with assistance from the steamship Ruchel Kleist(Prussia).
Margaret and Catherine	United Kingdom	The schooner was run down and sunk in the North Sea off Spurn Point, Yorkshire by Carlisle (United Kingdom). Her crew were rescued.
Maria Frederika	Prussia	The ship ran aground on the Kopersand Shoals. She was on a voyage from Königsberg to Emden, Kingdom of Hanover.
Newburg	United Kingdom	The ship was wrecked at "Knasburg". Her crew were rescued. She was on a voyage from Danzig to Perth.
Sarah Davison	United Kingdom	The schooner was wrecked at the mouth of the Little River, United States.

== 21 November ==
List of shipwrecks: 21 November 1841
Ship	State	Description
Ebenezer	United Kingdom	The ship was driven ashore at Southwold, Suffolk. She was refloated on 22 November and put into Lowestoft.
Friendship	United Kingdom	The brig was driven ashore south east of Havre de Grâce, Seine-Inférieure, France. Her crew were rescued. Friendship was refloated on 24 November and taken into Havre de Grâce.
Good Intent	United Kingdom	The ship was struck a rock and foundered off Donaghadee, County Down. She was on a voyage from Dublin to Troon, Ayrshire.
Lady Elphinstone	United Kingdom	The ship was wrecked on the West Plaat, in the North Sea off the Dutch coast. she was on a voyage from Glasgow, Renfrewshire to Rotterdam, South Holland, Netherlands.

== 22 November ==
List of shipwrecks: 22 November 1841
Ship	State	Description
Anne Maryland	United States	The ship departed from Cork, United Kingdom for New York. No further trace, presumed foundered with the loss of all hands.
Curlew	(United Kingdom of Great Britain and Ireland) New Zealand	The ship was driven ashore at Wellington. She was on a voyage from the Bay of Islands to Wellington. She was refloated.

== 23 November ==
List of shipwrecks: 23 November 1841
Ship	State	Description
Ann	United Kingdom	The ship was driven ashore on Dragør, Denmark. She was on a voyage from Stettin to the Firth of Forth.
Arab	United Kingdom	The ship was driven ashore on Dragør. She was on a voyage from Saint Petersburg, Russia to London.
Cassandra	United Kingdom	The barque foundered off Boscastle, Cornwall. She was on a voyage from Newcastle upon Tyne, Northumberland to Constantinople, Ottoman Empire.
Cerf	France	The ship was driven ashore near Copenhagen, Denmark. She was on a voyage from Saint Petersburg to Nantes, Loire-Inférieure.
Elizabeth	United Kingdom	The ship was driven ashore near "Wingo". She was on a voyage from Saint Petersburg to London. She was refloated on 1 December and taken into Gothenburg, Sweden.'
Minerva	United Kingdom	The ship was driven ashore 6 nautical miles (11 km) east of Littlehampton, Sussex. She was on a voyage from Gloucester to Shoreham-by-Sea, Sussex.
Oliver	United Kingdom	The ship was driven ashore in the Weser. She was on a voyage from Newcastle upon Tyne to Bremen.
Sarepta	United Kingdom	The brig was wrecked on Skagen, Denmark. She was on a voyage from Saint Petersburg to Leith, Lothian.
William Crow	United Kingdom	The ship was driven ashore on Dragør. She was on a voyage from Stettin to Hull, Yorkshire.

== 24 November ==
List of shipwrecks: 24 November 1841
Ship	State	Description
Auguste	Hamburg	The ship sprang a leak and was beached near Fårö, Sweden. She was on a voyage from Liverpool, Lancashire, United Kingdom to Hamburg.
Cicero	United Kingdom	The ship was driven ashore at "Balermo", Spain. She was on a voyage from Gibraltar to Malta and Alexandria, Egypt. Cicero was refloated on 1 December.
James Cooke	United Kingdom	The schooner was wrecked on Ennistown Head, County Meath with the loss of all but one of her eleven crew She was on a voyage from Sligo to Glasgow, Renfrewshire.
Juno	United Kingdom	The ship was driven ashore north of Sunderland, County Durham.
Mary	United Kingdom	The ship was driven ashore on "Malos Island". Her crew were rescued. She was on a voyage from Saint Petersburg, Russia to London.
Star	United Kingdom	The ship was driven ashore in Westgate Bay. She was on a voyage from Margate to Sheerness, Kent.

== 25 November ==
List of shipwrecks: 25 November 1841
Ship	State	Description
Mauricien	France	The ship was driven ashore on Île Bourbon. Her crew were rescued.
Sarah	United Kingdom	The ship ran aground at Bristol, Gloucestershire. She was on a voyage from Cork to Newport, Monmouthshire. Sarah was refloated on 30 November and resumed her voyage.

== 26 November ==
List of shipwrecks: 26 November 1841
Ship	State	Description
Dart	United Kingdom	The ship struck the Knavestone and was severely damaged. She was on a voyage from Limekilns, Fife to London. She consequently put into Berwick upon Tweed, Northumberland, where she arrived on 2 December.
Echo	United Kingdom	The ship ran aground in the Miramichi River. She was on a voyage from Miramichi, New Brunswick to Falmouth, Cornwall.
Emma	United Kingdom	The ship was driven ashore at Shoreham-by-Sea, Sussex, where she was wrecked the next day.
Lord Wenlock	United Kingdom	The ship was driven ashore at Dragør, Denmark. She was on a voyage from Saint Petersburg, Russia to Hull, Yorkshire. She was later refloated.
Medora	United Kingdom	The ship was driven onto the Seal Martin Rocks, County Antrim. She was on a voyage from Greenock, Renfrewshire to Trinidad. Medora was later refloated.
Prosperity	United Kingdom	The ship was driven ashore at Dragør. She was on a voyage from Riga, Russia to Hull. She was later refloated.
Regina	United Kingdom	The ship was driven ashore and wrecked at Shoreham-by-Sea.
Sceptre	United Kingdom	The ship ran aground on the Gunfleet Sand, in the North Sea off the coast of Essex. She was on a voyage from South Shields, County Durham to London. Sceptre was refloated and resumed her voyage.

== 27 November ==
List of shipwrecks: 27 November 1841
Ship	State	Description
Catherine	United Kingdom	The brig was wrecked on the Gunfleet Sand, in the North Sea off the coast of Essex. Her crew were rescued. She was on a voyage from Sunderland, County Durham to London.
Conservative	United Kingdom	The schooner was driven ashore at Point Koombornoo, in the Dardanelles.
Dorchester	United Kingdom	The ship was driven ashore and wrecked at Cape Jack, British North America. She was on a voyage from Pictou, Nova Scotia, British North America to London.
Elizabeth	United Kingdom	The ship ran aground near "Wingo". She was on a voyage from Saint Petersburg, Russia to London. She was refloated and put into Fotö, Sweden in a waterlogged condition.
Ligonier	Flag unknown	The cutter was driven ashore at the mouth of the Kowie River. She was later refloated.
Majestic	United Kingdom	The steam tug sank in the River Tweed at Berwick upon Tweed, Northumberland.
Mary and Margaret	United Kingdom	The ship was driven ashore at Saundersfoot, Pembrokeshire. She was later refloated.
New Zealand	United Kingdom	The barque was driven ashore at Cushendall, County Antrim. Her crew were rescued. She was on a voyage from Greenock, Renfrewshire to New Orleans, Louisiana, United States.
Wilhelmina	Flag unknown	The ship foundered in the English Channel off Start Point, Devon. Her crew were rescued.

== 28 November ==
List of shipwrecks: 28 November 1841
Ship	State	Description
HMS Driver	Royal Navy	The Driver-class sloop was driven ashore at Steel Point, Yorkshire. She was later refloated.
Douglastown	United Kingdom	The ship was driven ashore at Falmouth, Cornwall. She was on a voyage from Ardrossan, Ayrshire to Marseille, Bouches-du-Rhône, France. Douglastown was later refloated.
Savannah	United States	The steamship sprang a leak and foundered in the Atlantic Ocean off Cape Hatteras, North Carolina with some loss of life. She was on a voyage from New Hyork to New Orleans, Louisiana.
Waterwitch	United Kingdom	The steamship ran aground on the Holme Sand, in the North Sea off the coast of Norfolk. She was on a voyage from Hull, Yorkshire to London. Waterwitch was refloated and taken into Great Yarmouth, Norfolk.
William Salthouse	United Kingdom	The barque struck a reef in Port Philip Bay and was wrecked. She was on a voyage from Montreal, Province of Canada, British North America to Melbourne, New South Wales.

== 29 November ==
List of shipwrecks: 29 November 1841
Ship	State	Description
Amelia	Spain	The ship was wrecked off Havana, Captaincy General of Cuba with the loss of eleven of the 24 people on board. She was on a voyage from Cádiz to Veracuz, Mexico.
Ceylon	United Kingdom	The ship was wrecked at "Chimlico", British Honduras. Her crew were rescued.
Charlotte	United Kingdom	The ship was driven ashore near "Banken". Her crew were rescued. She was on a voyage from Dundee, Forfarshire to Greifswald.
Elizabeth	United Kingdom	The schooner was driven ashore at Sheerness, Kent. she was refloated the next day.
Felicity	United Kingdom	The ship was driven ashore at Flamborough Head, Yorkshire. Her crew were rescued. She was oh a voyage from Ipswich, Suffolk to Newcastle upon Tyne, Northumberland.
Forrester	United Kingdom	The brig was wrecked on Scroby Sands, Norfolk. Her crew were rescued. She was on a voyage from Seaham, County Durham to London.
Hotspur	United Kingdom	The ship was driven ashore on Dragør, Denmark. She was on a voyage from Saint Petersburg, Russia to London.
Hunter	United Kingdom	The ship was driven ashore at Helsingør, Denmark. She was on a voyage from Narva, Russia to Hull, Yorkshire.
Jane	(United Kingdom of Great Britain and Ireland) British North America	The ship ran aground on the Washball Rocks. She was refloated and taken into Saint John's, Newfoundland in a waterlogged condition.
Sophia	(United Kingdom of Great Britain and Ireland) Guernsey	The ship was driven ashore and wrecked at Sidmouth, Devon. Her crew were rescued.
William	United Kingdom	The schooner was driven ashore at Scituate, Massachusetts, United States. Her crew were rescued. She was on a voyage from Shelburne, Nova Scotia, British North America to Boston, Massachusetts.

== 30 November ==
List of shipwrecks: 30 November 1841
Ship	State	Description
Amyntas	United Kingdom	The brig was driven ashore and wrecked at Weymouth, Dorset with the loss of four of her crew. She was on a voyage from Richibucto, New Brunswick, British North America to Exeter, Devon.
Comte de Chazelles	France	The ship was wrecked on the Pointe du Cochon Penthière, Finistère with the loss of a passenger. She was on a voyage from Île Bourbon to Nantes, Loire-Atlantique.
Deux Sœurs	Belgium	The ship was wrecked on the Hinderbank, in the North Sea. She was on a voyage from Antwerp to St. Ubes, Portugal.
Edouard	France	The brig foundered in the English Channel off the coast of the Isle of Wight, United Kingdom.
Hotspur	United Kingdom	The ship was driven ashore near Dragør, Denmark. She was on a voyage from Saint Petersburg, Russia to London.
Hunters	United Kingdom	The ship was driven ashore near Helsingør, Denmark. She was on a voyage from Narva, Russia to Hull, Yorkshire. She was refloated and taken into Helsingør.
Salacia	France	The ship was driven ashore and wrecked at St. Ann's Head, Pembrokeshire. Her crew were rescued. She was on a voyage from Newport, Monmouthshire, United Kingdom to Nantes, Loire Atlantique.
Shakespeare	United Kingdom	The ship ran aground on the Upgang Rock, off the coast of Yorkshire. She was refloated and resumed her voyage.
Susan	United Kingdom	The ship was driven ashore at Bridport, Dorset. Her crew were rescued. She was on a voyage from London to the Gambia River. She was refloated on 23 December and taken into Bridport.

== Unknown date ==
List of shipwrecks: Unknown date in November 1841
Ship	State	Description
Amity	United Kingdom	The ship was driven ashore at Dover, Kent. She was on a voyage from Colombo, Ceylon to London. Amity was refloated on 1 December and taken into Dover in a severely leaky condition.
Borodino	Trieste	The ship was driven ashore at "Milada". She was on a voyage from Trieste to New York, United States. Borodino was refloated and put back to Trieste.
British Queen	United Kingdom	The ship was driven ashore on Gotland, Sweden. She was later refloated and taken into a port on the island for repairs.
Catrina	United States	The ship foundered in the North Sea off Schouwen, Zeeland, Netherlands on or before 19 November. She was on a voyage from New York to Rotterdam, South Holland, Netherlands.
Enigkret	Grand Duchy of Oldenburg	The ship was driven ashore at Spittal Point, Northumberland, United Kingdom. She was refloated on 27 November.
Greenwell	United Kingdom	The ship was driven ashore at Lowestoft. She was refloated on 21 November.
Helen	United Kingdom	The ship was driven ashore and damaged near Barber's Point, in the Dardanelles before 23 November. She was later refloated
Hermina	Stettin	The ship ran aground off Dragør, Denmark. She was on a voyage from Stettin to a Scottish port. She was refloated and towed into Copenhagen, where she arrived on 21 November.
Industry	United Kingdom	The ship collided with another vessel in the Atlantic Ocean off Ouessant, Finistère, France. She was dismasted and abandoned. Industry was subsequently towed into Boulogne, Pas-de-Calais, France, where she arrived on 19 November.
Isaac Enslow	United States	The ship was abandoned in the Atlantic Ocean. Her crew were rescued by Terax (United Kingdom). Isaac Enslow was on a voyage from Philadelphia, Pennsylvania to New York.
James	United Kingdom	The ship was lost off Domesnes, Norway before 21 November. Her crew were rescued. She was on a voyage from Riga, Russia to Newry, County Antrim.
John	United Kingdom	The brig was abandoned in the North Sea. She came ashore on Schouwen on 16 November.
John and Hannah's Endeavour	United Kingdom	The ship was driven ashore at Lowestoft. She was refloated on 21 November.
Lapwing	United Kingdom	The ship was abandoned in the North Sea with the loss of all hands. She was subsequently towed into Wivenhoe, Essex.
May and Jane	United Kingdom	The ship was driven ashore at Southwold, Suffolk. She was on a voyage from Spalding, Lincolnshire to London. May and Jane was refloated on 25 November and taken into Southwold for repairs.
Medora	United Kingdom	The ship ran aground on the Seal Martin Rocks. She was on a voyage from Greenock, Renfrewshire to Trinidad. Medora was refloated on 26 November and taken into Belfast, County Antrim for repairs.
Morning Star	United Kingdom	The ship was abandoned in the Atlantic Ocean before 16 November. She was on a voyage from Richibucto, New Brunswick, British North America to Liverpool, Lancashire.
Neptunus	Prussia	The ship was abandoned in the North Sea off Texel, North Holland, Netherlands before 19 November.
Ninian	United Kingdom	The barque was driven ashore on Hawke Island, Labrador, British North America. She was on a voyage from Quebec City, Province of Canada, British North America to Limerick. Ninian was refloated and resumed her voyage.
Perlin	United Kingdom	The ship ran aground on the Herd Sand, in the North Sea off the coast of County Durham and was severely damaged. She was refloated on 16 November.
Pitt	United Kingdom	The schooner was wrecked off the mouth of the Nazarette River in early November with the loss of seven of her crew.
Prince Albert	United Kingdom	The ship departed from Bristol, Gloucestershire for Terceira Island, Azores. No further trace, presumed foundered with the loss of all hands.
Runswick	United Kingdom	The ship was wrecked on Dragør. Her crew were rescued.
Sarah	United Kingdom	The ship was driven ashore in the Sea of Marmora. She was on a voyage from Odesa to Cork or to Falmouth, Cornwall. Sarah was refloated on 3 November.
Sarah and Helen	United Kingdom	The ship departed from the River Tyne for the Netherlands. No further trace, presumed foundered with the loss of all hands.
Sophia	United Kingdom	The ship was driven ashore and damaged in the Kowie River before 20 November. She was refloated on 29 November.
Union	United Kingdom	The barque was wrecked on the Sunk Sand, in the North Sea off the coast of Essex. Her crew were rescued by Sea Mew (United Kingdom).
