= Pauline Thornhill =

Canadian television host

Pauline Thornhill is a Canadian television host and producer of Canadian Broadcasting Corporation's longest running regional television program, Land and Sea on CBC owned-and-operated station CBNT-DT. She served in this capacity from 1993 to 2022. Thornhill grew up in Bay L'Argent. She graduated in 1986 from the journalism program at the University of King's College. Thornhill started work as a journalist with CBC Television in St. John's, Newfoundland and Labrador on the news program Here & Now. She became host and producer of CBC's Land and Sea in 1993. Thornhill received the 2004 Gracie Allen Award for the Land and Sea program "Built from Scratch", a story of the woman and her bakery.
