= Wooddale, Newfoundland and Labrador =

Coordinates: 49.056°N 55.593°W

Location of Wooddale in Newfoundland and Labrador

Wooddale is a settlement in Newfoundland and Labrador. The major industry of Wooddale is agriculture.
