= Samson Island, Newfoundland and Labrador =

Settlement in Newfoundland and Labrador, Canada

Coordinates: 49.499°N 54.954°W

Location of Samson Island in Newfoundland and Labrador

Samson Island is a settlement in Newfoundland and Labrador. It is located on the east coast of Newfoundland (on Notre Dame Bay, east of the Baie Verte Peninsula).
