= European Union ban on seal products =

Animal product ban

Elephant seals

The European Union banned seal products in 2009 for reasons of animal welfare. The ban was a continuation of a sealskin ban by the European Economic Community imposed in 1983.

Regulations of the European Union ("EU Seal Regime") generally prohibiting the importation and placing on the market of seal products, with certain exceptions, including for seal products derived from hunts conducted by Inuit or indigenous communities (IC exception) and hunts conducted for marine resource management purposes (MRM exception).

Canada and Norway filed a complaint before the WTO seeking to overturn the ban, but the ban was upheld.

== Seal hunting ==
Seal hunting occurs in various parts of the world for commercial, subsistence and cultural reasons. Seal hunting is also carried out in some areas for the sustainable management of marine resources. At least 15 seal species are currently hunted, but the majority of hunted animals belong to five species: harp seals, ringed seals, grey seals, hooded seals and cape fur seals. The seal populations that are hunted for commercial purposes – an estimated 15 million animals – are generally not endangered. Some 900,000 seals are hunted each year around the globe, with the commercial hunt in Canada, Greenland and Namibia accounting for some 60% of the seals killed each year. Hunting for commercial purposes also takes place in Russia and Norway. Around one third of the world trade in seal products either passes through or ends up in the EU market. Seal hunts around the world are governed by different rules and regulations. In some countries comprehensive systems are in place, while in others the seal hunt is regulated to a lesser degree. Within the EU, certain methods and means of capture and killing are prohibited in areas protected under EU nature law (i.e. the Habitats Directive).

== Conflict ==
As a result of the ban, Canada and Norway filed a complaint with the Dispute Settlement Body of the WTO against the European Communities claiming that the European Communities were being discriminatory against their producers of seal products. Both Canada and Norway are insistent on the fact that the seals are killed in an ethical manner and argued that ruling would potentially set a dangerous precedent going forward because it was based on morality and not science. Canada also argued that the Canadian government places strict regulation on their seal hunt industry, enforcing a quota to not allow any more than 400,000 seals be hunted in a given year. It is believed that only approximately 55,000 seals have been hunted through 2014.

=== Product at issue ===
Products that are either processed or unprocessed, deriving or obtained from seals.

=== Ruling and reaction ===
The WTO ruled in favour of the EU Seal regime and Canada and Norway filed for an appeal.

The Dispute Settlement Body appellate committee upheld the initial ruling issued. The decision reached by the WTO appellate will only spark more debates as to determine how such a controversial ban can be implemented when it had upheld some of its prior rulings while overturning others. They upheld the initial findings of the committee that the EU Seal Regime was in violation of the most-favored nation status of the GATT agreement. This is because the Seal Regime did not immediately allow access to the same market advantage to Canada and Norway as it did with Greenland. The appellate body upheld the panel's findings that the EU Seal Regime was "necessary to protect public morals" . Ross Lord reported that the WTO had found that despite the fact that the ban had been discriminatory towards Canadian and Norway as compared to the European seal hunting producers yet it had fulfilled the objective of addressing the EU's public moral concerns on seal welfare. The IFAW was very happy with the ruling, stating that it was a "great day for seals". Sheryl Fink, IFAW's wildlife campaigns director, blasted what she called "the desperate, last-ditch effort" to have the ban overturned. "The ruling confirms yet again that animal welfare concerns are a legitimate reason for WTO members to regulate trade, and that the EU is justified in banning the importation and sale of products from cruel commercial hunting of seals," Fink said.

== European Union regulations ==
Exemptions for fur products from Canada of certified indigenous origin was reached between Canada and the EU in October 2014. EU has approved Inuit sustainable hunt and production recognized by WWF and Greenpeace. The European Commission issued the regulation on the Inuit exemption in 2009.

- Regulation (EU) No 1007/2009 of 16 September 2009 on trade in seal products sets out harmonised rules for placing seal products on the EU market.
- Regulation (EU) No 2015/1850 of 13 October 2015 laying down detailed rules for the implementation of Regulation (EC) No 1007/2009 of the European Parliament and of the Council on trade in seal products.

However, the indigenous exemption had little effect on improving the livelihood of hunters. The biggest reason stated is that the original ban in 2009 destroyed the existing seal products market in Europe which did not return after the indigenous exemption was introduced. Furthermore, the exemption required large amounts of paperwork which resulted in very few sealskins and seal products being exported to the EU.

== See also ==
- Angry Inuk, a Canadian Inuit documentary film that defends the traditional seal hunt practice
