= Triangle, Newfoundland and Labrador =

Coordinates: 52°50′13″N 55°51′08″W

Triangle was a post office town in Newfoundland and Labrador in 1851. The postmistress in 1861 was Anne Cross. The population in 1901 was 1,459. It had 639 people in 1956.

== See also ==
- List of communities in Newfoundland and Labrador
