= Hawke Island =

Island in Newfoundland and Labrador, Canada

- Location within Newfoundland and Labrador

Geography
- Coordinates: 53.05°N 55.83°W

Administration
- Canada
- Province: Newfoundland and Labrador

Hawke Island is a small island off of the coast of Labrador. There is a harbour on the east side of the island named Hawke Harbour, or sometimes Hawke Bay. The Newfoundland Whaling Company operated a whaling station in Hawke Harbour in the late 1930s. Other inlets include Eagle Cove and Caplin Bay.
