= Newfoundland and Labrador Route 330 =

Highway in Newfoundland and Labrador, Canada

Coordinates: 49.16953°N 54.50672°W

Route 330
- Road to the Shore; Gander Bay Road

Route information
- Maintained by Newfoundland and Labrador Department of Transportation and Infrastructure
- Length: 142 km (88 mi)

Major junctions
- West end: Route 1 (TCH) in Gander
- Route 331 in Gander Bay South; Route 332 in Main Point; Route 332 south of Carmanville
- East end: Route 320 in New-Wes-Valley

Location
- Country: Canada
- Province: Newfoundland and Labrador

Highway system
- Highways in Newfoundland and Labrador
← Route 320	→ Route 331

Route 330 Beaton Tulk Highway, also known as Road to the Shore or more commonly Gander Bay Road, is a highway that extends from Gander, Newfoundland across "the loop" (as locals call it) passing through towns such as Gander Bay South, Carmanville, Musgrave Harbour, and Lumsden to New-Wes-Valley. Here, the highway connects with Route 320, which continues "the loop" down the west shore of Bonavista Bay exiting back to the Trans-Canada Highway (Route 1) in Gambo.

== Route description ==
Route 330 begins in Gander at an intersection with Route 1 (Trans-Canada Highway). It immediately heads north through a business district and neighbourhoods that are sandwiched between downtown to the west and the Gander International Airport to the east. The highway passes through more neighbourhoods before leaving Gander and heading up the rural Gander River Valley, where it passes by Jonathan's Pond Campground. Route 330 now follows the coastline of Gander Bay as it passes through the town of Gander Bay South, where it has an intersection with Route 331 (Boyd's Cove Highway), before it begins passing through the Straight Shore area of Newfoundland as it has a couple of intersections with Route 332 (Frederickton Road), one at Main Point, and the other at Carmanville. Route 330 passes east through inland areas for several kilometres, where it meets a local road leading to Aspen Cove and Ladle Cove, to pass through Musgrave Harbour. The highway now turns southeast along the coastline to pass by Banting Memorial Municipal Park before passing through Deadman's Bay and Lumsden. Route 330 meets a local road leading to Cape Freels, along with the community of the same name, before entering the New-Wes-Valley town limits and passing through Templeman, where it meets a local road to Newtown. Route 330 now enters Pound Cove and comes to an end shortly thereafter at an intersection between Route 320 (Road to the Shore) and a local road to Wesleyville.

== Renaming ==
On May 21, 2024, Premier Andrew Furey announced that the government would commemorate the highway to honour former Premier Beaton Tulk.

== Major intersections ==
Location	km	mi	Destinations	Notes
Gander	0.0	0.0	Route 1 (TCH) – Clarenville, Grand Falls-Windsor	Western terminus
Gander	1.3	0.81	James Boulevard - Gander International Airport	
	16.5	10.3	Jonathan's Pond Campground main entrance	Access road into campground
Gander Bay South	42.9	26.7	Route 331 west (Boyd's Cove Highway) – Clarke's Head, Twillingate	Eastern terminus of Route 331; provides access to Change Islands and Fogo Island ferries via Route 335
Main Point	50.4	31.3	Route 332 east (Frederickton Road) – Main Point, Davidsville, Frederickton	Western terminus of Route 332
Carmanville	62.9	39.1	Route 332 west (Frederickton Road) – Carmanville, Frederickton	Eastern terminus of Route 332
Carmanville	63.2	39.3	Main Street S (Route 330-13) - Carmanville South	
	76.9	47.8	Ladle Cove Road (Route 330-14) - Aspen Cove, Ladle Cove	
Musgrave Harbour	98.4	61.1	Banting Memorial Municipal Park main entrance	Access road into park
Deadman's Bay	115	71	Deadman's Bay Road (Route 330-45) - Deadman's Bay	
	132	82	Cape Freels Road (Route 330-28) - Cape Freels	
New-Wes-Valley	137	85	Newtown Road (Route 330-24) - Newtown	
New-Wes-Valley	142	88	Transitions to Route 320 south (Road to the Shore) – Hare Bay, Gambo; New-Wes-Valley Road (Route 320-36) - New-Wes-Valley	Eastern terminus
1.000 mi = 1.609 km; 1.000 km = 0.621 mi: Route transition

== See also ==
- List of Newfoundland and Labrador highways
