= Straight Shore =

Stretch of coastline in Newfoundland and Labrador

- General location of area known as the Straight Shore
- Coordinates: 49°22′00″N 53°44′00″W

The Straight Shore is a 45-kilometre (28 mi) section of coastline on the island of Newfoundland in Newfoundland and Labrador, Canada. It follows a generally northwesterly direction from the town of Cape Freels to Musgrave Harbour and then a generally westerly direction along the southern shore of Sir Charles Hamilton Sound to Gander Bay. The name may have been derived from the stretch of sandy beaches along the stretch between Cape Freels and Musgrave Harbour. The name stayed and was extended to include the section from Musgrave Harbour to Gander Bay South. Route 330 follows along the geographic area of the Straight Shore.

Communities along the Straight Shore are; Cape Freels, Lumsden, Deadman's Bay, Doting Cove, Musgrave Harbour, Ragged Harbour, Ladle Cove, Aspen Cove, Carmanville, Noggin Cove, Frederickton, Davidsville, Main Point and Gander Bay.
