= Newfoundland and Labrador Route 331 =

Highway in Newfoundland and Labrador

Route 331
- Boyd's Cove Highway

Route information
- Maintained by Newfoundland and Labrador Department of Transportation and Infrastructure
- Length: 27.4 km (17.0 mi)

Major junctions
- West end: Route 340 in Boyd's Cove
- Route 335 near Horwood
- East end: Route 330 in Gander Bay South

Location
- Country: Canada
- Province: Newfoundland and Labrador

Highway system
- Highways in Newfoundland and Labrador
← Route 330	→ Route 332

Route 331, also known as Boyd's Cove Highway, is a 27.4-kilometre-long (17.0 mi) east–west highway on the island of Newfoundland in the province of Newfoundland and Labrador. It connects the town of Boyd's Cove with the Gander Bay area of the island.

== Route description ==
Route 331 begins in Boyd's Cove just south downtown at an intersection with Route 340 (Road to the Isles). It winds its way east through rural areas between some lakes to have an intersection with Route 335 (Farewell Road), which provides access to the ferries leading to the Change Islands and Fogo Island. The highway then has an intersection with a short local road leading to Horwood shortly thereafter and dipping southeast for several kilometres. Route 331 begins following the coastline of Gander Bay as it passes through the communities of Rodgers Cove, Victoria Cove, Wings Point, and Clarke's Head. The highway now makes a sharp turn to the east to cross the Gander Bay Causeway over Gander Bay to enter Gander Bay South and come to an end shortly thereafter at an intersection with Route 330 (Gander Bay Road).

== Major intersections ==
Location	km	mi	Destinations	Notes
Boyd's Cove	0.0	0.0	Route 340 (Road to the Isles) to Route 1 (TCH) – Lewisporte, Summerford, Twillingate	Western terminus
	4.9	3.0	Route 335 north (Farewell Road) – Stoneville, Port Albert	Southern terminus of Route 335; provides access to Change Islands and Fogo Island ferries
	7.8	4.8	Horwood Road (Route 331-10) - Horwood	
Rodgers Cove	16.4	10.2	Rodgers Cove Road (Route 331-11) - Rodgers Cove	
Gander Bay South	27.4	17.0	Route 330 (Gander Bay Road/Road to the Shore) to Route 1 (TCH) – Musgrave Harbour, Gander	Eastern terminus
1.000 mi = 1.609 km; 1.000 km = 0.621 mi
