= Gander Bay Causeway =

Causeway across Gander Bay, Newfoundland, Canada

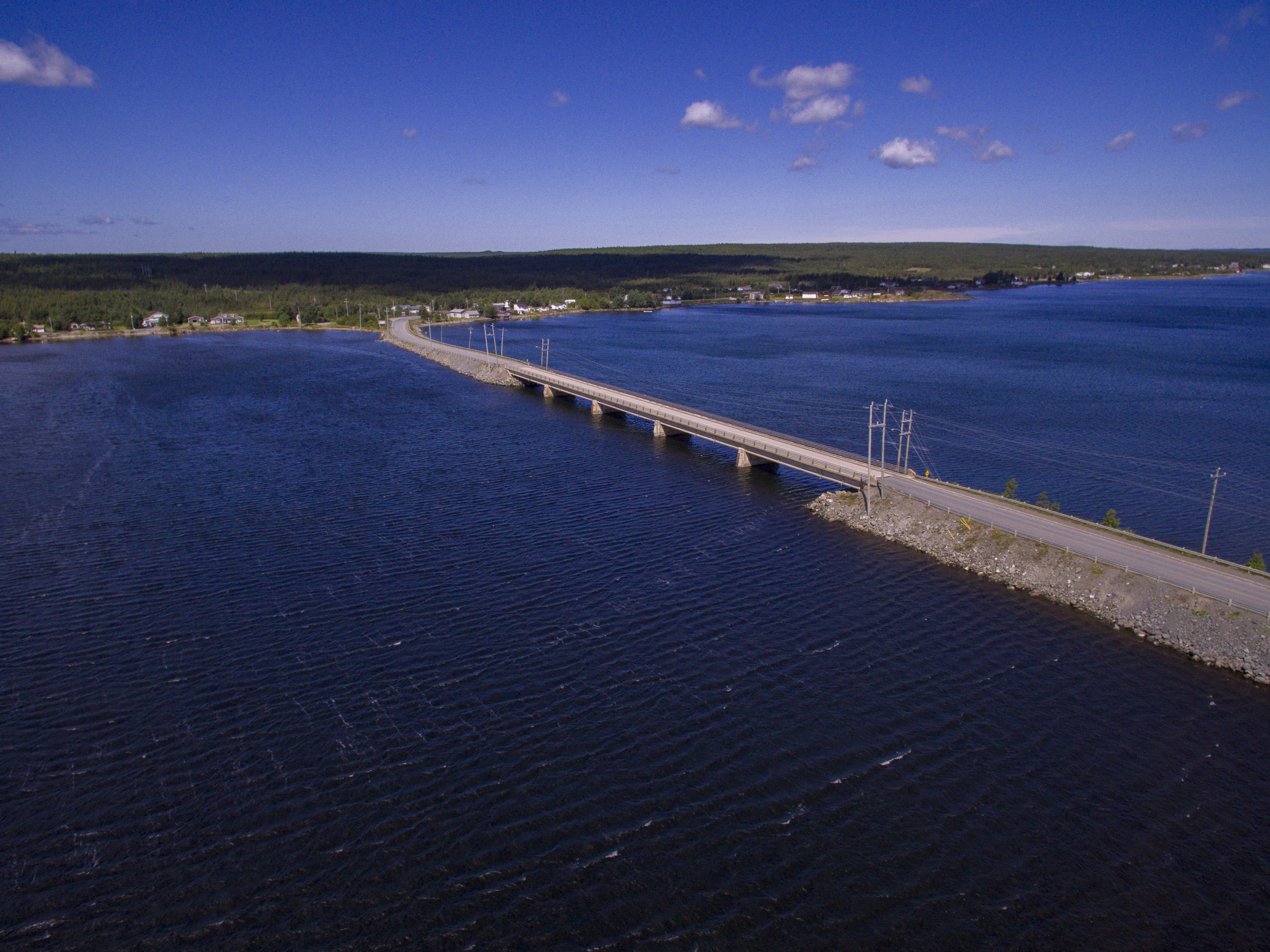
- The Gander Bay Causeway, viewed towards the community of Clarke's Head
- Coordinates: 49°17′12.4″N 54°29′32″W
- Crosses: Gander Bay, Newfoundland, Canada
- Begins: George's Point located in Gander Bay South
- Ends: Clarke's Head
- Owner: Department of Transportation and Works
- Maintained by: Department of Transportation and Works

Characteristics
- Design: Rockfill with spanning concrete bridge at centre
- Total length: Bridge length 191m
- Width: 8.7 m (29 ft)
- Height: 3 m (9.8 ft)
- Water depth: 2.5 m (8 ft 2 in)
- No. of spans: 1
- Piers in water: 4
- No. of lanes: 2
- First section length: Causeway length 840 m (2,760 ft) including bridge length of 191 m (627 ft)

History
- Construction end: 1968

Location
- Interactive map of Gander Bay Causeway

The Gander Bay Causeway was built in 1968 at a cost of $1,350,000. Located in the narrow section of Gander Bay, Newfoundland, Canada, it connects the communities of Clarke's Head and George's Point within the community of Gander Bay South. As a section of Route 331, the causeway became the eastern access to the town of Gander for the residents of Lewisporte and surrounding communities. When the causeway was built the travel distance from New World Island and Gander was shortened by 35 kilometres (22 mi). It also shortened the route from the Straight Shore to New World Island by 118 kilometres (73 mi).

== Citations ==
=== Sources ===
==== Books ====
- Smallwood, Joseph R.; Pitt, Robert D.W.; Horan, Cathrine; et al., eds. (1984). "Causeways". Encyclopedia of Newfoundland and Labrador, Volume 1. St. John’s, Newfoundland and Labrador: Newfoundland Book Publishers (1967) Ltd. ISBN 0-9693422-0-9.

==== Online ====
- Department of Transportation and Works, ed. (2018). Bridge Inspection Report - B11292017-6 (PDF).
