= Newfoundland and Labrador Route 332 =

Highway in Newfoundland and Labrador

Route 332
- Frederickton Road

Route information
- Maintained by Newfoundland and Labrador Department of Transportation and Infrastructure
- Length: 23.8 km (14.8 mi)

Major junctions
- West end: Route 330 in Main Point
- East end: Route 330 in Carmanville

Location
- Country: Canada
- Province: Newfoundland and Labrador

Highway system
- Highways in Newfoundland and Labrador
← Route 331	→ Route 333

Route 332, also known as Frederickton Road, is a 23.8-kilometre-long (14.8 mi) east-west highway on the northern coast of the island of Newfoundland in the Canadian province of Newfoundland and Labrador. It serves as a loop route off of Route 330 (Gander Bay Road), connecting several communities along the coastline of Hamilton Sound with the highway. Route 332 is one of very few highways in the province that both begin and end on the same highway.

== Route description ==
Route 332 begins at an intersection with Route 330 in Main Point and winds its way north along the coastline to pass through both that community and neighbouring Davidsville. The highway now turns more inland as it passes through rural wooded areas for several kilometres, where it passes through Beaver Cove, before passing through Frederickton. Route 332 turns southeast through more rural areas before following the coastline again as it passes through Noggin Cove. It now passes through Carmanville before coming to an end at another intersection with Route 330.

== Major intersections ==
Location	km	mi	Destinations	Notes
Main Point	0.0	0.0	Route 330 (Gander Bay Road/Road to the Shore) to Route 1 (TCH) – Gander, Musgrave Harbour	Western terminus
Carmanville	23.8	14.8	Route 330 (Gander Bay Road/Road to the Shore) to Route 1 (TCH) – Gander, Musgrave Harbour	Eastern terminus
1.000 mi = 1.609 km; 1.000 km = 0.621 mi
