= Gander Bay, Newfoundland and Labrador =

Coordinates: 49.267°N 54.500°W

Gander Bay is a collection of communities along Route 330 in Newfoundland and Labrador, Canada. The communities include Clarke's Head, Victoria Cove and Stoneville.
