= Newfoundland and Labrador Route 335 =

Highway in Newfoundland and Labrador

Route 335
- Farewell Road

Route information
- Maintained by Newfoundland and Labrador Department of Transportation and Infrastructure
- Length: 20.1 km (12.5 mi)

Major junctions
- South end: Route 331 near Horwood
- North end: Fogo Island and Change Islands ferries (MV Veteran) in Farewell

Location
- Country: Canada
- Province: Newfoundland and Labrador

Highway system
- Highways in Newfoundland and Labrador
← Route 334	→ Route 340

Route 335, also known as Farewell Road, is a highway in the northern portion of Newfoundland in the Canadian province of Newfoundland and Labrador. The highway's southern terminus is at the junction at Route 331 near the community of Horwood, and its northern terminus is the community of Farewell, a community where the Fogo Island and Change Islands ferries, served by the MV Veteran, depart or arrive.

== Route description ==
Route 335 begins at an intersection with Route 331 (Boyd's Cove Highway) near the turnoff for the town of Horwood. It heads northeast along a riverbank to pass through Stoneville and wind its way along the coast of the Dog Bay of Hamilton Sound for several kilometres. The highway now curves westward to cross a peninsula to come to an intersection with a local road leading to Port Albert. Route 335 now turns northward through rural terrain to enter Farewell, where the highway comes to a dead end at the Change Islands and Fogo Island ferry docks.

== Major intersections ==
Location	km	mi	Destinations	Notes
	0.0	0.0	Route 331 (Boyd's Cove Highway) – Boyd's Cove, Gander Bay South	Southern terminus
	16.4	10.2	Port Albert Road (Route 335-10) - Port Albert	
Farewell	20.1	12.5	MV Veteran ferry - Change Islands, Fogo Island	Dead End at ferry docks; northern terminus
1.000 mi = 1.609 km; 1.000 km = 0.621 mi
