= Tornadoes in Atlantic Canada =

From the 1800s to today, tornadoes have occurred, even if rarely, in Atlantic Canada. The area averages around 0.5-1.5 tornadoes each year.

== Tornadoes ==
,
Date	Time (24hr Local)	Location	Rating	Notes	Path Length	Max. Width	Max. Wind Speed	Deaths	Injuries	Extra Citations
August 5, 1859		Charlottetown, Prince Edward Island	FU	A tornado destroyed trees and property, and capsized a vessel where at least two drowned.				>2		
1872		Westmorland County, New Brunswick	FU (Likely Strong)	An unrated tornado destroyed houses, fences and trees.						
August 6, 1879		Bouctouche, New Brunswick	F3	A tornado destroyed many homes and caused multiple deaths.				>5		
August 6, 1890		Sainte-Anne Parish, New Brunswick	FU (Likely Strong)	A tornado destroyed 31 buildings.						
August 17, 1892		O'Leary, Prince Edward Island	FU (Likely Strong)	A tornado destroyed many homes, and some barns.				1		
July 28, 1893		Hanlee Grove, Prince Edward Island	FU	A tornado destroyed two barracks.						
August 2, 1893		Charlottetown, Prince Edward Island	FU	A tornado uprooted trees and damaged provincial buildings.						
August 4, 1895		Bridgetown-Clarence-Paradise, Nova Scotia	FU (Likely Strong)	A tornado uprooted and threw trees, ripped the top story of a barn off and carried it for over a mile, with parts being driven over 3 feet into the ground. A house as well as more barns and stables were destroyed.						
July 15, 1901		Kingsclear-New Maryland Parish, New Brunswick	FU	A tornado damaged 10 barns.						
July 7, 1934		St. Stephen, New Brunswick	F0					0	1	
January 30, 1954	23:30	White Point Beach, Nova Scotia	F1	A tornado as well as lightning and hail. The tornado destroyed a barn, snapped trees, and damaged cabins.				0	0	
July 18, 1955		Tidnish, Nova Scotia	F1	Three waterspouts came ashore, causing damage in Tidnish.				0	0	
July 22, 1980	11:20	Roseway, Nova Scotia	F0	Two eyewitnesses saw a funnel cloud, trees were uprooted, and a fully packed camper trailer carried 3–5 m and overturned.	1.01 km	130m		0	0	
August 9, 1980	12:00	Maple Green, New Brunswick	F0					0	0	
August 15, 1980	17:00	Strathgartney, Prince Edward Island	F0	Damage area extended from Strathgartney to North Whiltshire. Trees uprooted, corn fields flattened, mobile home lifted off its blocks. Witness saw 'a thick dark cloud' reminded her of the severe hail storm experienced a few previously.	1.63 km			0	0	
August 16, 1980	14:30	Northport, Nova Scotia	F0	Witness described funnel as great slender funnel shape.		20m		0	0	
September 28, 1980	18:15	Cape Traverse, Prince Edward Island	F0	Boat carried 15 m from shore. Garage was damaged; flying garage door may have hit the home since windows were smashed. Resident said 'it was like something came and hit the place.' Waterspouts had been seen by CN Marines ferries. A 9,000 kg oil tanker was blown over.				0	0	
July 8, 1981	15:00	Scotchtown, New Brunswick	F2		3.6 km			0	0	
July 19, 1982	15:00	Bathurst, New Brunswick	F1					0	0	
September 9, 1982	16:30	Wilmont, Prince Edward Island	F0	Two girls saw skies darken and heard a strong wind, they ran to the basement. House had shingles removed, a 1,400 kg barn was lifted off its mooring and moved 60 cm. Storm 'lasted about 6 seconds.'				0	0	
August 3, 1983		Gander Bay South, Newfoundland	F0	Report of tornado from former meteorologist John Bursey in vicinity of Sunshine Pool, Gander River.				0	0	
September 7, 1983	15:30	McNamee, New Brunswick	F1	Historical searches of newspaper articles and satellite imagery provide no evidence for the tornado.	4.8 km			0	0	
August 30, 1987		St. Lawrence, Newfoundland	F0	Tornado reported in St. Lawrence area (Flight Services Specialist at YYT and observers at ADS).				0	0	
July 16, 1991	15:30	Grand Falls, Newfoundland	F1	Despite F1 rating no damage documented; winds 110 km/h reported.			110 km/h	0	0	
June 12, 1992	15:30	Fredricton, New Brunswick	F0	Funnel cloud sighted by 2 observers NW of Fredericton. Tornado with a 300 m by 50 m track observed 15:30-18:00 just NE of Fredericton.				0	0	
July 10, 1993	18:40	McGiveny, New Brunswick	F1	18:40-18:55 sighting confirmed. Golf-ball size hail and many mature trees broken or uprooted.				0	0	
June 18, 1994	16:00	Mactaquac, New Brunswick	F1	Steel roofing torn off a barn. 45 kg cow mats moved. Trees uprooted.				0	0	
July 26, 1995	17:30	Fredricton, New Brunswick	F1	Inflatable roof torn from tennis complex, damage to vehicles from debris, and power poles downed.				0	0	
July 26, 1995	20:30	Keswick Ridge, New Brunswick	F2	Roof torn from building, trees uprooted, funnel cloud spotted moving away from area.				0	0	
September 6, 1996	14:00	Trinity, Newfoundland	F1	A number of flimsy structures are damaged by wind losing walls and roofs. Debris from shoreline wind blown through the wall of a structure. Patio furniture/muskoka chairs collapsed. Note that 2:00 local time is approximate based on radar imagery and witness info.				0	0	
June 24, 1997	17:15	Lantz, Nova Scotia	F0	Brief tornado touchdown in ball field.				0	0	
July 4, 1997	13:30	Grand Falls, New Brunswick	F1	Trail of destruction in a field, farmer's field ripped up, a building under construction was damaged and roof torn off.				0	0	
July 10, 1998	14:00	Charleston, New Brunswick	F2	Total destruction of mobile home which was thrown 30 m. 90 m by 7 km path of damage. Minor injuries to residents in home.	7 km	90m		0	2	
July 18, 1999	17:00	Lakeville, New Brunswick	F0	Probable F1 Tornado downed 30 trees. Also large hail and heavy rain. No injuries.				0	0	
July 18, 1999	18:00	Durham Bridge, New Brunswick	F0	Probable F0 Tornado, downed a few trees. snapped power lines, no injuries.				0	0	
August 18, 1999		Pugwash, Nova Scotia	F0	Confirmed event from top 10 weather stories page. 'A weak tornado, a rarity at any time in Nova Scotia, touched down on August 18 in Pugwash, tearing the dining room off a café and carrying it across a parking lot, leaving behind the kitchen with a dazed cook and her manager'.				0	0	
July 4, 2002	10:45	Saint-Jacques, New Brunswick	F1	Site surveyed by MSC forecaster.				0	0	
July 31, 2004	17:00	Saint-Jacques, New Brunswick	F1	Trees twisted off or snapped at the trunk and siding from home removed.				0	0	
July 13, 2005	12:30	Jacksontown, New Brunswick	F1	F1 rating with no damage description.				0	0	
July 2, 2006	19:00	South Johnville-Argyle, New Brunswick	F2	Confirmed tornado around 22:00 UTC. Severe damage to power lines and houses. Downed trees. Heavy rain and hail 2–3 cm in diameter. NTP (2024) - A large set of photographs was sent which led to revisiting this case. Sentinel-2 and Google Earth aerial imagery show a long track with heavy forest damage and multiple buildings (all assumed barns) destroyed and later removed. Globe and Mail article also has local resident saying barn was flattened. Rating upgraded from F1 to F2.	19.5 km	1.2 km		0	0	
July 2, 2006	19:25	Nashwaak Lake, New Brunswick	F2	EC-Operations had noted that there was also damage reported in the vicinity of Miramichi Lake. Following the work on the South Johnville - Argyle tornado, this area was examined for evidence of damage. A long path entirely through forested areas was found using Sentinel-2 and Google Earth aerial imagery, with multiple large areas with most or all trees down (harvesting was clearly underway as seen in Google Earth imagery). The path has several curves but no sharp bends. It is likely that this tornado was caused by the same supercell, therefore the time was estimated as being 25 min following the start of the first tornado. This and the previous tornado are the widest tornadoes confirmed in Atlantic Canada.	22.8 km	1.2 km		0	0	
August 15, 2006	18:00	Pokemouche-Evangéline, New Brunswick	F1	Tornado impacted the area of Pokemouche and Evangeline. Hail, damaging winds and intense lightning were reported in the region. A tornado swept along a corridor of 20–50 metres wide and 3-5 kilometres long extending from Pokemouche through Evangeline. The tornado, estimated in the lower F1 range (wind estimated around 120 km/h), caused structural damage to a few properties and uprooted/snapped a few trees along the corridor. The sighting of the actual funnel cloud/tornado was reported by a few members of the public.	4.02 km	50m		0	0	
June 16, 2007		Petitcodiac, New Brunswick	F0	The storm knocked down trees and hurled pieces of playground equipment and wheelbarrows long distances. In one incident, the twister picked up a trampoline from a front lawn and threw it 18 metres into a pasture. It also hurled two cast iron rockers (weighing more than 50 kg each) about the same distance. Made F-scale assessment based on description above and using wind damage table.				0	0	
July 29, 2007	16:00	Grand Falls-Windsor, Newfoundland	F0	Witnesses describe seeing tornado touch down in a remote area (possible across a lake) near Norris Point. No office follow-up as it did not appear to cause any structural or property damage. Time estimated from archived radar.				0	0	
July 29, 2007	17:30	Gander Bay, Newfoundland	F0	Reports were that it first touched down at Wings Point, on the NW side of Gander Bay, crossed the Bay, then moved over Main Point on the SE side of the Bay. A few snowmobile trailers were flipped over as it passed, as well as a couple of ride-on lawnmowers, and a residential deck. Several trees were snapped. An area of grass was also flattened. Associated with a severe thunderstorm outbreak on July 29, likely a supercell. Time estimate from archived radar. No injuries or fatalities.	4 km			0	0	
July 20, 2013	19:20	Jesmeg-Whites Cove- Cambridge Narrows-Codys, New Brunswick	EF1	ECCC in Atlantic Region apparently did a survey but files are unavailable. Media did report that ECCC rated the tornado as EF1 however. Canadian Press articles had enough information to get a rough start location, and Landsat was used to determine the first half of the track. There were reports of barns down in a few locations but unclear to what degree and the quality of construction, so used lower bound of DOD8 (EF1). Tree damage seen via Landsat also supports only EF1. The second half of the track is estimated from videos of the tornado crossing the lake and damage near Cambridge Narrows and Codys. Radar from US side shows a clear mesocyclone with a supercell crossing the area, which provided the time.	24 km	500m	150 km/h	0	0	
August 1, 2015	15:50	Sheephouse Falls, New Brunswick	EF1	Satellite imagery review revealed a historical damage track through forested area. EF-scale assessment based on swaths of worst tree damage is DOD5 for DI C-T, with max wind speed estimated at 145 km/h. No ground survey conducted, no damage reports found.	4.69 km	160m	145 km/h	0	0	
July 18, 2016	17:30	Saint-Quentin, New Brunswick	EF1	About 120 ha. of trees blown down. 30,000 tonnes of fallen timber salvaged by J. D. Irving Co. Lower-bound wind speeds because of shallow ground in the area. Tornado moved from WSW to ENE. Black Brook, NB WSW of Boston Brook, NB. NTP (2024) - Satellite imagery review revealed the tornado damage track, with a length of 8.85 km and max. path width of 330 m.	8.85 km	330m	145 km/h	0	0	
August 7, 2016		Grand Mira South, Nova Scotia	EF0	A tornado was confirmed near Grand Mira South, Nova Scotia.				0	0	
August 7, 2018	18:15	Knowlesville, New Brunswick	EF1	Satellite imagery review of a storm track revealed a tornado damage path through forested areas. High-resolution aerial imagery was collected in August 2018. Damage assessed as EF1, with an estimated max. wind speed of 145 km/h, track length of 38.3 km and max. path width of 490 m.	38.3 km	490m	145 km/h	0	0	
September 3, 2018	21:00	Rectangle Lake, Labrador	EF2	Satellite imagery review revealed a tornado damage path in forested areas south of Labrador City. Tornado damage assessed as EF2, with an estimated max. wind speed of 190 km/h, track length of 3.91 km and max. path width of 320 m.	3.91 km	320m	190 km/h	0	0	
June 30, 2021	14:45	Stewiacke, Nova Scotia	EF1	Structural damage and tree damage was reported in the Stewiacke area following a storm passing through. An ECCC ground survey was completed on July 1, 2021. Upon NTP analysis of survey photos and drone imagery collected by the public, EF1 tornado damage was confirmed at a farm property in the community, with an estimated track length of 620 m, max. path width of 50 m and max. wind speed of 155 km/h.	0.62 km	50m	155 km/h	0	0	
July 22, 2021	15:44	Antrim, Nova Scotia	EF0	Witness near Antrim captured video of a tornado passing within a few kilometres and could see trees bending in the distance. No damage reported and satellite imagery review revealed no visible damage. The EF-Scale assessment is default EF0.				0	0	
July 21, 2022	18:45	Wild Goose Lake, New Brunswick	EF2	Satellite imagery review of a storm track of interest revealed a tornado damage path through forested areas near Wild Goose Lake, north of Summit Depot. Damage assessed as EF2 tornado, with an estimated max. wind speed of 190 km/h, track length of 3.03 km and max. path width of 290 m.	3.03 km	290m	190 km/h	0	0	
August 24, 2023	19:50	Point Riche, Newfoundland	EF0	Witnesses in the Port au Choix area captured photos of a waterspout over the Gulf of St. Lawrence that came ashore at Point Riche. Several picnic tables were damaged. Preliminary damage assessment is EF0 tornado, with estimated max. wind speed of 110 km/h. Information available insufficient to accurately estimate track length, max. path width and tornado motion.			110 km/h	0	0	
June 30, 2024	15:15	Carlow, New Brunswick	EF0	House and tree damage was reported in the Carlow area after a storm passed through. No injuries were reported. Satellite imagery revealed some tree damage in the area. An NTP ground and drone survey was completed on July 4–5, 2024, documenting the reported damage. Damage assessed as EF0 tornado, with an estimated max. wind speed of 125 km/h, track length of 7.29 km and max. path width of 300 m.	7.29 km	300m	125 km/h	0	0	
June 30, 2024	15:20	Centre Glassville, New Brunswick	EF0	Tree damage was reported in the Foreston area after a storm passed through. No injuries were reported. Satellite imagery revealed additional tree damage along the storm track. An NTP ground and drone survey was completed on July 4–5, 2024, documenting tree damage from Centre Glassville to east of Foreston. Possible downburst damage was also documented by the team. Tornado damage preliminarily assessed as EF0, with an estimated max. wind speed of 130 km/h, track length of 16.4 km and max. path width of 650 m.	16.4 km	650m	130 km/h	0	0	
November 1, 2024	17:00	Harvey, New Brunswick	EF0	-	1.46 km	120m	115 km/h	0	0	
November 1, 2024	17:25	Sheffield, New Brunswick	EF1	-	11.9 km	400m	135 km/h	0	0	
November 1, 2024	18:35	Churchs Corner, New Brunswick	EF1	-	3.99 km	150m	150 km/h	0	0	
June 26, 2026	20:39	Petitcodac, New Brunswick	EF0	-				0	0	

Confirmed tornadoes by Fujita rating
FU	F0	F1	F2	F3	F4	F5	Total
8	17	14	5	1	0	0	45

Confirmed tornadoes by Enhanced Fujita rating
EFU	EF0	EF1	EF2	EF3	EF4	EF5	Total
0	6	7	2	0	0	0	15

== Notable Tornadoes ==
=== 1879 Bouctouche F3 ===
On August 6, 1879, the highest rated tornado to touch down in Atlantic Canada formed near Bouctouche, New Brunswick. It tracked through the town, causing severe damage and destroying upwards of 100 buildings. It caused at least 5 fatalities and numerous injuries in its 14km track, and reached a width of nearly half a kilometre.

Main Article: 1879 Bouctouche Tornado

=== 1954 White Point Beach F1 ===
On January 30, 1954, near midnight, a damaging tornado formed on White Point Beach, Nova Scotia. It caused some of the more significant tornadic damage ever recorded in Nova Scotia, and was noted as an anomaly due to the time of year and time of day it occurred. No casualties were reported.

=== 2013 Jesmeg-Whites Cove-Cambridge Narrows-Codys EF1 ===
On July 20, 2013, a tornado touched down near Jesmeg, New Brunswick. It was notable because it was long-tracked relative to many other tornadoes that have touched down in the region, and it hit a much more populated area, and was heavily documented. No casualties were reported.

=== 2021 Stewiacke EF1 ===
On June 30, 2021, Nova Scotia's strongest tornado since 1955 touched down in Stewiacke, and many news outlets soon covered it. It was short-lived, but managed to entirely destroy a barn and cause moderate tree damage. No casualties were reported.

=== 2024 November Mini-Outbreak ===
On November 1, 2024, several storm systems produced three tornadoes within just 2 hours. One of the tornadoes, which touched down in Harvey, was rated EF0, while the other two, that touched down in Sheffield and Churchs Corner respectively, were rated EF1. All three tornadoes were over 100m wide, which, relative to most tornadoes that have occurred in Atlantic Canada, is quite large. No casualties were reported, despite the large number of tornadoes within such a small period.

== Tornado records ==
Widest Tornadoes In Atlantic Canada (Path Widths >100m)
#	Max. Path Width	Location	Rating	Date
1(Tied)	1200m	South Johnville-Argyle, New Brunswick	F2	July 2, 2006
1(Tied)	1200m	Nashwaak Lake, New Brunswick	F2	July 2, 2006
2	650m	Centre Glassville, New Brunswick	EF0	June 30, 2024
3	500m	Jesmeg-Whites Cove-Cambridge Narrows-Codys, New Brunswick	EF1	July 20, 2013
4	490m	Knowlesville, New Brunswick	EF1	August 7, 2018
5	400m	Sheffield, New Brunswick	EF1	November 1, 2024
6	330m	Saint-Quentin, New Brunswick	EF1	July 18, 2016
7	320m	Rectangle Lake, Labrador	EF2	September 3, 2018
8	300m	Carlow, New Brunswick	EF0	June 30, 2024
9	290m	Wild Goose Lake, New Brunswick	EF2	July 12, 2022
10	160m	Sheephouse Falls, New Brunswick	EF1	August 1, 2015
11	150m	Churchs Corner, New Brunswick	EF1	November 1, 2024
12	130m	Roseway, Nova Scotia	F0	July 22, 1980
13	120m	Harvey, New Brunswick	EF0	November 1, 2024

Ilderton May 8, 2025

== See also ==
- 1879 Bouctouche tornado
