= Wadham Islands =

Group of islands in Canada

Coordinates: 49°33′14″N 53°50′59″W

The Wadham Islands are a group of islands at the eastern opening to Hamilton Sound, southeast of Fogo Island off Newfoundland in the province of Newfoundland and Labrador, Canada. The islands are: Offer Wadham Islands (the most northernly and easterly), Copper Island, Duck Island, White Island, Peckford Island (the largest), Coleman Island, Small Island.

== History ==
The Wadham Islands were extremely popular fishing grounds since the early 19th century and were first used by crews from Bonavista. Mostly the Offer Wadhams and Peckford islands were used, as they had ideal drying conditions and some of the best salt cod in the country. Many families who fished off these islands decided to settle in nearby Doting Cove and fish off the Wadham Islands in the summer. Such families were the Cuffs, Hickses and Moulands in the 1850s. For more than 100 years Doting Cove men moved to the Wadham Islands in the summer to fish. In 1858, the Offer Wadham Lighthouse was erected on the Offer Wadham islands, the first lighthouse on the northern part of Bonavista Bay. After the lighthouse was constructed, there was a small year-round population of lightkeepers and their families. In 1899, there were post offices established at Peckford's Island and Offer Wadhams. They also had schools, a Methodist church and mercantile premises.

== Church history ==
A Methodist church was erected on the Wadham Islands in the late 19th century. The residents had to collect money in order to buy a Bible for the church. An inscription on the Bible reads: "Wadham Island Methodist Church July 1899. Bought by subscription collected by Mrs. Charles H. Prowse".

Church services were held nearly every Sunday in the summer and were conducted by residents on the island. Lay readers and appointed readers were:

- Mr. and Mrs. Prowse (lightkeepers)
- Joseph Dyke, Doting Cove - appointed
- Charles Abbott, Bonavista, appointed
- Lewis Wellon, Ladle Cove, lay reader
- Thomas West, Ladle Cove, lay reader
- Samuel Wellon, Ladle Cove, lay reader
- Israel Hicks, Carmanville, lay reader
- Archibald Way, Newtown, appointed
- Rev. Beaton Hicks, Doting Cove, he preached his first sermon on the Wadham Islands.

== Popular culture ==
Between May 1976 and June 1977, historian and explorer Tim Severin recreated the seven-year voyage to a new land across the Atlantic Ocean and back described in the medieval Latin text Navigatio Sancti Brendani Abbatis (The Voyage of St. Brendan the Abbot). At the end of their 4,500-mile (7,200 km) passage, Severin and his crew first made landfall at Peckford Island. The project is detailed in Severin's 1978 book The Brendan Voyage.

== See also ==
- Abbotts Cove, settlement located upon Peckford Island
- List of communities in Newfoundland and Labrador
