= Abbotts =

Abbotts may refer to:

== People ==
- George Abbotts (1602–1645), English politician
- John Abbotts (1924–2008), English footballer
- Robin Hodgson, Baron Hodgson of Astley Abbotts (born 1942), British Conservative Party politician and life peer
- William Abbotts (1736–1805), one of the founding fathers of the British town of Leamington Spa

== Places ==
- Abbotts, a common part of many village names:
  - Abbotts Ann, a village in Hampshire, England
  - Abbotts Barton, a village in Hampshire, England
  - Aston Abbotts, a village in Buckinghamshire, England
  - Astley Abbotts, a village in Shropshire, England
  - Brampton Abbotts, a village in Herefordshire, England
  - Stanstead Abbotts, a village in Hertfordshire, England
  - Stapleford Abbotts, a village in Essex, England
  - Thorpe Abbotts, a village in Norfolk, England
- Abbotts, Western Australia, an abandoned town in Western Australia
- Abbotts Ann Down, a hamlet in Hampshire, England
- Abbotts Cove, a settlement in Newfoundland and Labrador
- Abbotts Creek Township, Forsyth County, North Carolina, US
- Cotton Abbotts, a former civil parish in Cheshire, England

== Other uses ==
- Abbotts Colleges, South Africa
- Abbotts Creek, North Carolina, a river in the US
- Abbotts Hall Farm, Essex, England
- Abbotts Lagoon, California, US
- Abbotts Moss Nature Reserve, Cheshire, England
- Inventing the Abbotts, 1997 American coming-of-age film
- Sompting Abbotts Preparatory School, a historic West Sussex independent school in Sompting, England
