= Deadman's Bay, Newfoundland and Labrador =

Local service district and designated place in Canada

Coordinates: 49°20′54″N 53°41′39″W

Deadman's Bay is a local service district and designated place in the Canadian province of Newfoundland and Labrador. It is on the Straight Shore of Bonavista Bay near the community of Lumsden. The community is located near fishing grounds, contributing to its diversified and successful fishery despite its exposed, sandy coastline and harsh fall storms.

== History ==
Deadman's Bay was first recorded in the 1845 Census of Newfoundland, at which time 24 people were living there. These inhabitants belonged to the Church of England and made their living as fishers. The primary reason for settling in Deadman's Bay was for the Labrador fishery; however, after 1869 the base of the economy became the inshore fishery. The population continued to increase as people from Bonavista, Cape Freels, and Lumsden moved to Deadman's Bay. In 1901, however, the community experienced a population decline which lasted for twenty years. In 1921 the population was growing again with nearly 100 people in 1945 and 180 by 1956. Electricity became available in Deadman's Bay in 1963, they also had their own elementary school, and by 1981 they were catching cod, flounder, catfish, herring, mackerel, salmon, squid, and lobster.

Church history

In the 1800s the people of Deadman's Bay were of the Church of England. They had no church or resident minister, however, ministers from nearby communities would visit there to perform services, baptisms, and burials. For example, the Rev. Julian Moreton, a missionary in Greenspond, made his first visit to Deadman's Bay in August 1850 which he describes in his book, Life and Work in Newfoundland. By 1901 the people of Deadman's Bay had converted to Methodism. In 1981 the population was primarily United Church and Salvation Army.

== Geography ==
Deadman's Bay is in Newfoundland within Subdivision M of Division No. 8.

== Demographics ==
As a designated place in the 2016 Census of Population conducted by Statistics Canada, Deadman's Bay recorded a population of 130 living in 56 of its 74 total private dwellings, a change of −16.1% from its 2011 population of 155. With a land area of 12.57 km^{2} (4.85 sq mi), it had a population density of 10.3/km^{2} (26.8/sq mi) in 2016.

== Government ==
Deadman's Bay is a local service district (LSD) that is governed by a committee responsible for the provision of certain services to the community. The chair of the LSD committee is Norman Goodyear.

== See also ==
- List of communities in Newfoundland and Labrador
- List of designated places in Newfoundland and Labrador
- List of local service districts in Newfoundland and Labrador
