= Lumsden, Newfoundland and Labrador =

Lumsden Cat Harbour
- Town
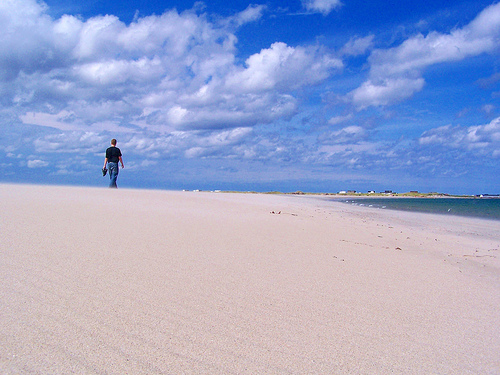

- Location of Lumsden in Newfoundland
- Coordinates: 49°16′58.8″N 53°37′1.2″W
- Country: Canada
- Province: Newfoundland and Labrador
- Incorporated: 1968

Government
  - Mayor: Damien Gibbons

Area
  - Total: 20.43 km^{2} (7.89 sq mi)

Population (2021)
  - Total: 535
  - Density: 26.1/km^{2} (68/sq mi)
- Time zone: UTC-3:30 (Newfoundland Time)
  - Summer (DST): UTC-2:30 (Newfoundland Daylight)
- Postal code span: A0G 3E0
- Area code: 709
- Highways: Route 330

Lumsden, formerly known as Cat Harbour, is a community located on the Straight Shore of Newfoundland in Newfoundland and Labrador, Canada, near communities such as Musgrave Harbour and Newtown. Lumsden formerly consisted of two settlements, Lumsden North on the tip of a sandy peninsula and Lumsden South on the main road. Although the harbour in Lumsden is not ideal because it is not sheltered, Lumsden has excellent fishing grounds.

== History ==
Lumsden, then called Cat Harbour, was visited as early as the 18th century by French fishermen because of its good inshore fishing grounds. On an early French map, Lumsden was named Hav. Dechire, or Wrecking Harbour. It was a part of the French Shore until 1783.

In an 1836 census, the population was recorded as 97 for Lumsden and Cape Freels combined. The population of Lumsden increased as the migratory fishery declined because people began to settle permanently. The name was changed from Cat Harbour to Lumsden in 1917 after the Rev. James Lumsden. The economy in Lumsden was based on the Labrador fishery, inshore fishery, seal fishery, and woods work. There was also a small boat fishery which trucked the fish to the community of Valleyfield. The people of Lumsden were avid supporters of the Fisherman's Protective Union, a local council was formed in 1901 and a union store was built in 1912 and was open until 1932. The first highroad in Lumsden was built in 1952, and a regional high school was built ten years later in 1962. Eventually Lumsden North and South merged when the North settlement was vacated, and the town of Lumsden was incorporated in 1968.

== Church history ==
The first people in Lumsden were Church of England and Roman Catholic. The nearest missionary was Rev. Coster in Greenspond. He first visited Lumsden in June 1832 and he baptized eleven children. The Rev. Gilchrist visited Lumsden twice a year during his mission in Greenspond, and the Rev. Julian Moreton also visited and recorded it in his journal and reports. The Methodist population began to increase in the 1850s and by the 20th century Methodism was dominant in Lumsden. The first Methodist church was built by 1898 but it burned down in 1915. The first Jehovah's Witnesses in Newfoundland were in Lumsden North in 1917, started by a local merchant Wesley Howell. A school room was opened in 1859 with a Mr. Moses Davis as the teacher, a new school came in 1910.

== Demographics ==
In the 2021 Census of Population conducted by Statistics Canada, Lumsden had a population of 535 living in 226 of its 305 total private dwellings, a change of 6.8% from its 2016 population of 501. With a land area of 19.2 km^{2} (7.4 sq mi), it had a population density of 27.9/km^{2} (72.2/sq mi) in 2021.

== See also ==
- List of cities and towns in Newfoundland and Labrador
