= Ladle Cove =

Designated place in Canada

Coordinates: 49.450°N 54.050°W

Ladle Cove is a designated place in the Canadian province of Newfoundland and Labrador. It is along the Straight Shore on the island of Newfoundland.

== History ==
The first settlers in Ladle Cove are believed to have been Samuel and Tobias Pinsent, who stayed for the winter in 1862. The first land grant was issued to the Methodist board of education in 1876; the next grant was given to the West Brothers in 1877. By 1869 there were 48 people living in the cove, some of whom spent the summer fishing around the Offer Wadham Islands. In the 1880s, the fertile soil enabled Ladle Cove to ship surplus vegetables to other communities. The first post office was established in Abraham Tulk's home around 1885; it remained there until 1919, when Martha Stratton had it in her home. A post office was built in 1925. The population in 1951 was 176.

Church history

Although most of the population at the beginning of settlement were Church of England, there was no Church of England church. The first Methodist school-chapel in Ladle Cove opened in 1884 and the first minister was either James Wilson or A.J. Cheeseman. Between 1862 and 1874, ministers from Greenspond and Fogo visited to perform services, baptisms, burials and marriages. From 1874 to 1884, the ministers came from Musgrave Harbour until Ladle Cove got its own church, which fell under the Musgrave circuit. In 1894 a new church was opened by Thomas Darby.

== Geography ==
Ladle Cove is in Newfoundland within Subdivision L of Division No. 8. It is situated on Notre Dame Bay, near Musgrave Harbour on Hamilton Sound.

Ladle Cove is close to good fishing grounds off the Wadham Islands. It also attracted settlers because the soil is fertile enough for growing vegetables.

== Demographics ==
As a designated place in the 2016 Canadian census, Ladle Cove recorded a population of 112 living in 45 of its 87 total private dwellings; in 2011 the population was 0. With a land area of 15.93 km^{2} (6.15 sq mi), it had a population density of 7.0/km^{2} (18.2/sq mi) in 2016.

== Economy ==
Early settlers in the area fished for cod in Ladle Cove or on Peckford and Wadham Islands; the cod was sold to Fogo or St. John's. They also hunted for food and grew their own vegetables. The lobster fishery was also important, and the Tulks operated a lobster factory in Ladle Cove. There was also some small-scale sealing, herring and salmon fishing, and logging (since the early 1900s).

== Education ==
The first teaching in Ladle Cove was done by Louisa Wellon in 1875 in her father's store. The first school was located on the same land as the church when the land was granted to the Methodist Board of Education in 1876. The school started in 1878 with William Bradley as the first teacher. A new one-room school opened in 1904 with Edwin Baker as the teacher.

== See also ==
- List of communities in Newfoundland and Labrador
- List of designated places in Newfoundland and Labrador
