= Aspen Cove, Newfoundland and Labrador =

Community in Newfoundland and Labrador

Aspen Cove is a small fishing community in the province of Newfoundland and Labrador, Canada. Formerly called Aspey or Apsey Cove, Aspen Cove was named for the presence of aspen trees in the area. It first appears in the 1857 Census as Apsey Cove with a population of thirteen, all dependent on the salmon fishery. By the 1870s more families moved to Aspen Cove for the cod and lobster fisheries. In the 1921 census the population had reached 104 and the economy had changed from salmon, fur, and agriculture to cod, lobster, and lumbering.

== History ==
The first recorded census of settlers in this community is in the 1857 census with thirteen inhabitants of one family whose living depended on the salmon fishery. According to local belief, from oral tradition, the first settlers of Aspen Cove discovered remains of a Beothuk encampment on the shores of the cove.

The first settler was from Fogo, a Robert Shelly (later Shelley) born at Hampshire, England who originally came to settle at Barr'd Islands. The first postmistress was Edith Tulk.

Church history

From 1857 to 1874 all the inhabitants at Aspen Cove were Church of England. However, once Methodism was introduced in Aspen Cove, many people either turned to Methodism or more Methodists moved there. By 1902 a Methodist school-chapel was built; a new church was built in 1964. In the 1950s there were also some Jehovah's Witnesses living in Aspen Cove, but the population was mainly United Church.

== Geography ==
Aspen Cove is in Newfoundland within Subdivision L of Division No. 8. Located in the mouth of Hamilton Sound between Carmanville to the west and Musgrave Harbour to the east, the community is situated in the only protected area behind a small headland on the northwest side. It is believed that the name is derived from the aspen trees that were once abundant in the area.

== Demographics ==
As a designated place in the 2016 Census of Population conducted by Statistics Canada, Aspen Cove recorded a population of 178 living in 80 of its 101 total private dwellings, a change of -19.1% from its 2011 population of 220. With a land area of 3.06 km^{2} (1.18 sq mi), it had a population density of 58.2/km^{2} (150.7/sq mi) in 2016.

== Government ==
Aspen Cove is a local service district (LSD) that is governed by a committee responsible for the provision of certain services to the community. The chair of the LSD committee is Steven Tulk.

== See also ==
- List of communities in Newfoundland and Labrador
- List of designated places in Newfoundland and Labrador
- List of local service districts in Newfoundland and Labrador
