= Tim Severin =

British explorer, historian, writer (1940–2020)

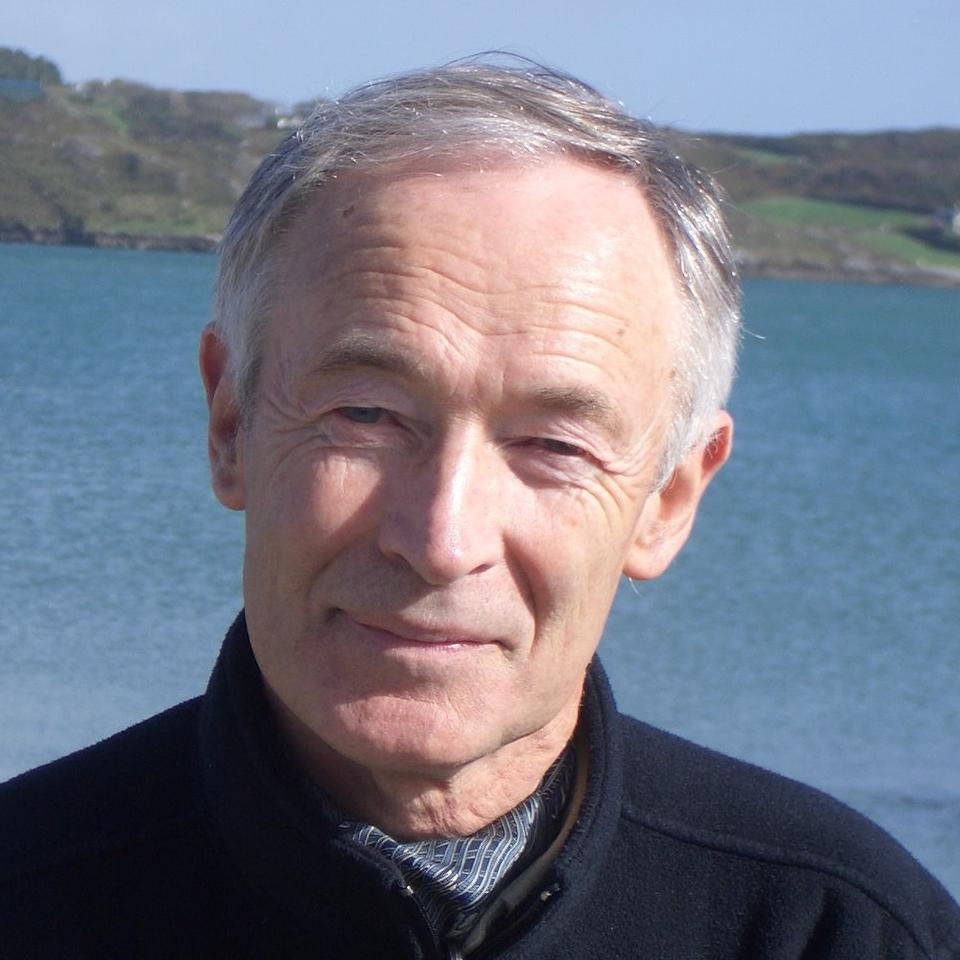
- Born: Timothy Severin; 25 September 1940; Jorhat, Assam, British India
- Died: 18 December 2020 (aged 80); Timoleague, West Cork, Ireland
- Education: Tonbridge School; Keble College, Oxford
- Occupations: Explorer, historian, writer
- Writing career
- Period: 1978–2020
- Genres: Historical fiction, non-fiction
- Website: timseverin.net

Timothy Severin (25 September 1940 – 18 December 2020) was a British explorer, historian, and writer. Severin was noted for his work in retracing the legendary journeys of historical figures. Severin was awarded both the Founder's Medal of the Royal Geographical Society and the Livingstone Medal of the Royal Scottish Geographical Society. He received the Thomas Cook Travel Book Award for his 1982 book The Sindbad Voyage.

== Personal life and career ==
He was born Giles Timothy Watkins in 1940 to Maurice and Inge Watkins in Jorhat, Assam, India, where his father managed a tea plantation. Educated in England from age 7, he attended Tonbridge School and studied geography and history at Keble College, Oxford. In 1964, he received a Commonwealth Fund Fellowship (Harkness Fellowship) to study the history of exploration at Harvard University, University of Minnesota, and University of California, Berkeley. He adopted the name Severin to honour his maternal grandmother, who cared for him in his youth.

Severin married twice. His first wife was Dorothy Sherman, a specialist in medieval Spanish literature; that marriage ended in divorce. He later married Dee Pieters.

Severin died on 18 December 2020, aged 80, at home in Timoleague, West Cork, Ireland. He is survived by his daughter from his first marriage, Ida Ashworth, and two grandsons.

== Recreating ancient voyages ==
=== Tracking Marco Polo (1961) ===
While he was an undergraduate at Oxford University, Severin, Stanley Johnson and Michael de Larrabeiti retraced Marco Polo's thirteenth-century journey through Asia on motorcycles, using Polo's The Description of the World as a guide. They travelled from Oxford via Switzerland to Venice, through Turkey, Persia and Afghanistan, surviving sandstorms, floods, motorcycle accidents, and time spent in jail. Severin and his guides rode camels through the Deh Bakri pass to identify the Persian "apples of Paradise" and the hidden hot springs described by Polo. They were unable to complete the voyage due to visa problems at the border of China and returned to England by sea from Bombay (recounted in Tracking Marco Polo, 1964).

=== Explorers of the Mississippi (1967) ===
From conquistadors to nineteenth-century gentlemen explorers, Severin follows the routes and tells the stories of the adventurers who have travelled along the US river the Mississippi for hundreds of years, and does so while navigating the length of the river by canoe and launch.

=== The Brendan Voyage (1976–1977) ===
It is theorized by some scholars that the Latin texts of Navigatio Sancti Brendani Abbatis (The Voyage of St Brendan the Abbot) dating back to at least 800 AD tell the story of Brendan's (c. 489–583) seven-year voyage across the Atlantic Ocean to a new land and his return. Convinced that the legend was based on historical truth, in 1976 Severin built a replica of Brendan's currach. Handcrafted using traditional tools, the 36-foot (11 m), two-masted boat was built of Irish ash and oak, hand-lashed together with nearly two miles (3 km) of leather thong, wrapped with 49 traditionally tanned ox hides, and sealed with wool grease.

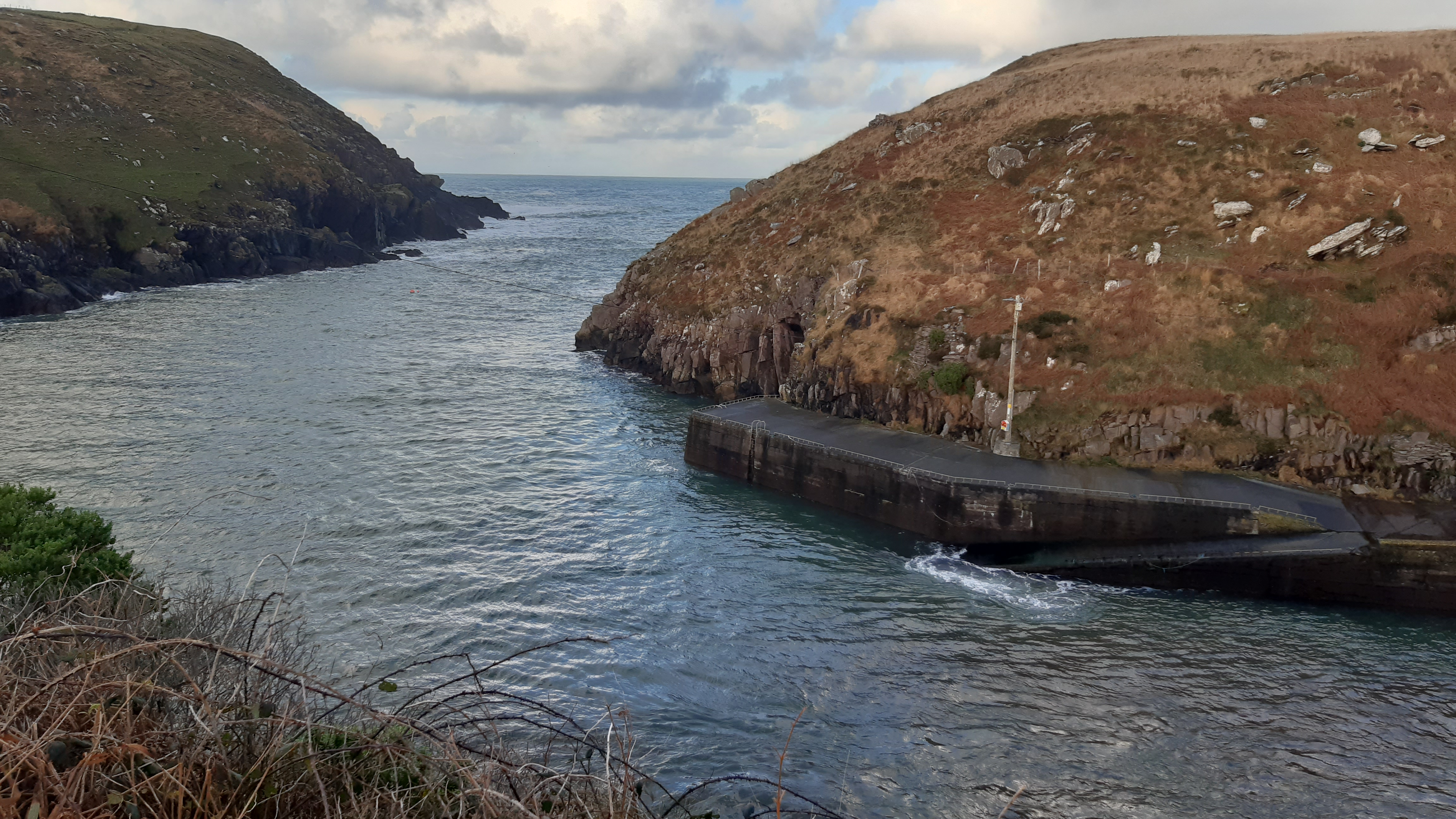
Brandon Creek on the Dingle peninsula, Ireland from which Severin and crew embarked on their Brendan Voyage

On May 17, 1976, Severin and his crew (George Maloney, Arthur Magan, Tróndur Patursson) sailed from the Dingle Peninsula, County Kerry on the Brendan, and, over more than 13 months, travelled 4,500 miles (7,200 km), arriving at Canada on June 26, 1977, landing on Peckford Island, Newfoundland, before being towed to Musgrave Harbour by the Canadian Coast Guard. Severin told reporters, "We've proved that a leather boat can cross the North Atlantic by a route that few modern yachtsmen would attempt.". Along the way, they had stopped at the Hebrides, the Faroe Islands and Iceland (where they spent the winter until departing again on May 11) en route. He considered that his recreation of the voyage helped to identify the basis for many of the legendary elements of the story: the "Island of Sheep", the "Paradise of Birds", "Crystal Towers", "mountains that hurled rocks at voyagers", and the "Promised Land". Severin's account of the expedition, The Brendan Voyage, became an international best-seller, translated into 16 languages.

The boat is now featured at the Craggaunowen open-air museum in County Clare, Ireland.

=== The Sindbad Voyage (1980–1981) ===
The adventures of the medieval sailor Sindbad, as recorded in One Thousand and One Nights, became the inspiration for Severin's next voyage. After three years of researching the legend and early Arab and Persian sketches of medieval ships, he brought the project to Sur, Oman in 1980. Sponsored by Qaboos bin Said al Said, Sultan of Oman, he guided Omani shipwrights in the construction of the "Sohar", an 87-foot (26.5 m) replica of a ninth-century, lateen-rigged, cotton-sailed Arab dhow. The ship was constructed in seven months of hand-sawn wooden planks sewn together with nearly 400 miles (640 km) of hand-rolled, coconut-husk rope.

Sohar left Oman on 21 November 1980. Navigating by the stars, Severin and his crew of 25 travelled nearly 6,000 miles (9,600 km) in eight months. From Sur they sailed east across the Arabian Sea, south down India's Malabar Coast to Lakshadweep and on to Calicut, India. The next phase of their voyage took them down the coast of India to Sri Lanka. From Galle they sailed across the Indian Ocean, on route they were becalmed in the doldrums for nearly a month, suffered broken spars, and were nearly run down by freighters, but arrived in Sabang on 17 April, then down the Malacca Straits to Malacca and Singapore arriving 1 June, then on to Guangzhou, China on 6 July.

=== The Jason Voyage (1984) ===
The epic poem Argonautica, first written down by Apollonius of Rhodes in Alexandria in the late 3rd century BC, became the basis for Severin's next expedition. He began his research into ancient Greek ships and the details of the text in 1981. Master shipwright Vasilis Delimitros of Spetses hand built a 54-foot (16.5 m) replica of a Bronze Age galley based on a scale model of the Argo. In 1984, with twenty volunteer oarsmen, Severin rowed and sailed from northern Greece through the Dardanelles, crossed the Marmara Sea, and passed through the Straits of Bosphorus to the Black Sea, reaching the Phasis delta in then-Soviet Georgia: a voyage of 1,500 miles (2,400 km). Along the way they identified some of the landmarks visited by Jason and his Argonauts, and found a possible explanation for the legend of the Golden Fleece. Severin recounted the expedition in The Jason Voyage (1985).

=== The Ulysses Voyage (1985) ===
Once again making use of the Argo from The Jason Voyage, in 1985 Severin followed the route of Ulysses' voyage home in The Odyssey, from Troy to Ithaca in the Ionian Islands. Along the way, Severin made tentative or conclusive identifications of The land of the Lotus-eaters, King Nestor's palace, the Halls of Hades, the Roving Rocks, Scylla and Charybdis, and also the sirens. The Ulysses Voyage, published in 1987, tells the story of the expedition, the historical research that went into it, and the discoveries Severin and his crew made along the way.

=== By Horse to Jerusalem (1987/88) ===
Nine hundred years after the First Crusade, Tim Severin and Sarah Dormon set out on horseback to follow the 2500 mile route of Duke Godfrey of Boullion and other Crusaders from Belgium to Jerusalem, travelling through the modern lands of Germany, Austria, Hungary, Yugoslavia (itself today consigned to history), Bulgaria, Turkey and Syria. The horses chosen were a riding school palfrey (Mystery) and a Heavy Ardennes (Carty), the latter a descendant of the war horses of Crusader cavalry – what Severin called ‘the Main Battle Tank’ of its day. This journey, after many years of marine expeditions, was a return to long-distance land exploration by Severin. The Journey would take place over 2 years with the horses and riders resting over the winter of 1987/8. Severin was unable to follow exactly the route of Duke Godfrey due to the civil war in the Lebanon, instead routing through Syria and Jordan to reach Jerusalem.

=== In Search of Genghis Khan (1990) ===
While still a student at the University of Oxford, Severin wrote his thesis on the first European travellers in Central Asia during the thirteenth and fourteenth centuries. With this background, to commemorate the 800th birthday of Genghis Khan he rode with Mongol herdsmen along the route once used by couriers of the Mongolian empire, mingled with camel herders in the Gobi Desert, and ate with Kazakhs in their yurts. His story, part travelogue, part research paper, was published in 1993 under the title In Search of Genghis Khan.

=== The China Voyage (May–November 1993) ===
Ancient Chinese texts tell the story of Hsu Fu, a navigator and explorer sent by the first Emperor of China, Qin Shi Huang, in 218 BC into the "Eastern Ocean" in search of life-prolonging drugs. Hsu Fu completed the voyage on a bamboo raft, which some believe took him to America and back.

Severin set out to prove that such a voyage could have been made. On the beach at Sam Son, Vietnam, he oversaw the construction of a 60-foot (18.3 m) long, 15-foot (4.6 m) wide raft built of 220 bamboos and rattan cording, and driven by an 800 square foot (74 square metre), junk-rigged sail. After leaving Asia in May 1993, Severin and his crew faced monsoons, pirates and typhoons before the rattan began rotting and the raft began falling apart in the mid-Pacific. After travelling 5,500 miles (8,850 km) in 105 days, they were forced to abandon the raft about 1,000 miles (1,600 km) short of their destination.

Although the Hsu Fu, as the craft was named, did not complete the trip, Severin believed the voyage had accomplished its purpose. In The China Voyage, published in 1994, he wrote that the expedition had proved that a bamboo raft of the second century BC could have made a voyage across the Pacific, just as Hsu Fu's account recorded.

=== In Search of Moby Dick: Quest for the White Whale (1999) ===
Following the path of the Pequod, Severin sets out to find a living, white sperm whale. His quest takes him to the remotest parts of the South Pacific: the Philippine island of Pamilacan, whose people hunt whale sharks with their hands and grappling hooks and the Indonesian island of Lamalera, whose people hunt sperm whales with harpoons from open boats. Throughout his expedition, Severin was able to compare Melville's account with the reality he discovers, and to show that much of Melville's material was either borrowed or fabricated.

== Fiction ==
Severin also wrote historical fiction. The Viking Series, first published in 2005, concerns a young Viking adventurer who travels the world. In 2007 he published The Adventures of Hector Lynch series, set in the late 17th century, about a 17-year-old Corsair.

== Works ==
=== Non fiction ===
- Tracking Marco Polo (1964) – Motorcycle ride from Oxford to Venice to Central Asia along the Silk Road
- Explorers of the Mississippi (1968)
- The Golden Antilles (1970) – Travellers, adventurers and soldiers of fortune who searched for a promised land in the Caribbean
- The African Adventure (1973)
- Vanishing Primitive Man (1973)
- Adventurers and Explorers (1973) – Severin wrote the text for all fifty tea cards in the Brooke Bond collection on the theme of Adventurers and Explorers
- The Oriental Adventure: Explorers of the East (1976) – A history of European explorers in Asia
- The Brendan Voyage (1978) – Sailing a leather currach from Ireland to Newfoundland
- The Sindbad Voyage (1983) – Sailing an Arab dhow from Muscat, Oman to China
- The Jason Voyage: The Quest for the Golden Fleece (1986) – Sailing from Greece to Georgia
- The Ulysses Voyage (1987) – Sailing from Troy to Ithaca
- Crusader (1989) – Riding a heavy horse from Belgium to the Middle East
- In Search of Genghis Khan (1991) – See Genghis Khan
- The China Voyage (1994) – Across the Pacific Ocean (almost) on a bamboo raft named Hsu-Fu
- The Spice Islands Voyage (1997) – See Alfred Russel Wallace, a voyage through the Indonesian archipelago
- In Search of Moby-Dick (1999) – See Herman Melville
- Seeking Robinson Crusoe (aka In Search of Robinson Crusoe) (2002) – See Robinson Crusoe
- The Man Who Won Siberia (2014)

=== Fiction ===
==== Viking Series ====
- Odinn's Child (2005)
- Sworn Brother (2005)
- King's Man (2005)

==== Saxon ====
- The Book of Dreams (2012)
- The Emperor's Elephant (2013)
- The Pope's Assassin (2015)

==== The Adventures of Hector Lynch ====
- Corsair (2007)
- Buccaneer (2008)
- Sea Robber (2009)
- Privateer (2014)
- Freebooter (2017)

=== Movies ===
- The Brendan Voyage: parts 1, 2 – on YouTube
- The Sindbad Voyage
- The Jason Voyage (Voyage of the Heroes): parts 1, 2, 3, 4 – on YouTube

== Awards and honours ==
- 1986 Founder's Medal of the Royal Geographical Society
- Livingstone Medal of the Royal Scottish Geographical Society
- Honorary Doctor of Letters, Trinity College Dublin
- Honorary Doctor of Letters, University College, Cork
- Gold Medal of the Maritime Institute of Ireland
