= Noggin Cove, Newfoundland and Labrador =

Local service district in Canada

Coordinates: 49°24′47″N 54°19′05″W

Noggin Cove is a local service district and designated place in the Canadian province of Newfoundland and Labrador. It is west of Carmanville on the south side of Hamilton Sound. It is said to be named after Noggin Island, about 5 km off its eastern point.

== History ==
It is believed that the first settler in Noggin Cove was named Doyle from Tilting on Fogo Island. He lived on the western side for a few years before returning to Tilting. The 1857 Census of Newfoundland recorded a population of six, most likely the Doyle family, and they were all Roman Catholic. The next recorded family was Robert and Sarah Wheaton's family of 13, but they moved again in 1874. It was in the late 1870s before permanent settlement began in Noggin Cove. Most settlers came from Ochre Pit Cove, the first being Levi Pennell and Charles White. Other names include Parsons, Gillingham, Angells, Snow, and Whites. By 1884 the population was 46. In 1911 the population was recorded as 112. The main employers for people in Noggin Cove was the Labrador fishery, the cod fishery, summer fishery off the Wadham Islands, and later logging, sawmills and lobster fishing were important.

Church history

Almost all of the earliest permanent settlers were Methodist and since there was no church in Noggin Cove they went to the nearby community of Frederickton to attend the Methodist church. There was a school built in the early 20th century which they also used as a chapel. Noggin Cove came under the Carmanville Methodist Circuit in the 20th century.

== Geography ==
Noggin Cove is in Newfoundland within Subdivision L of Division No. 8.

== Demographics ==
As a designated place in the 2016 Census of Population conducted by Statistics Canada, Noggin Cove recorded a population of 258 living in 100 of its 114 total private dwellings, a change of -1.5% from its 2011 population of 262. With a land area of 2.31 km^{2} (0.89 sq mi), it had a population density of 111.7/km^{2} (289.3/sq mi) in 2016.

== Government ==
Noggin Cove is a local service district (LSD) that is governed by a committee responsible for the provision of certain services to the community. The chair of the LSD committee is Gerald Gillingham.

== See also ==
- List of communities in Newfoundland and Labrador
- List of designated places in Newfoundland and Labrador
- List of local service districts in Newfoundland and Labrador
