= 1879 Bouctouche tornado =

Weather event in New Brunswick, Canada

Coordinates: 46.473°N 64.725°W

Tornado outbreak
- Tornadoes: 1
- Max. rating: F3 tornado

Overall effects
- Fatalities: 5-8
- Damage: $100,000 USD

On Wednesday, August 6, 1879, an intense tornado, later determined to have an F3 rating, struck the town of Bouctouche, New Brunswick. While weaker tornadoes and waterspouts have been known to form on or adjacent to Nova Scotia and Prince Edward Island, the tornado is the strongest tornado ever to touch down in the Maritime Provinces and the easternmost strong (F2-F3) tornado ever to occur on the continent of North America as well.

The tornado initially started in the Sainte-Marie Parish, New Brunswick around 1:00 PM AST before moving eastward towards Mill Creek, New Brunswick. From Mill Creek, the tornado followed the northern edge of the Buctouche River resulting in tree damage and crop damage over a 400 to 500 yards (370 to 460 m) wide path for 9 miles (14 km) before impacting Bouctouche, New Brunswick. As the tornado entered the town, it destroyed upwards of 100 buildings, including the Bouctouche Church. The tornado missed the St Mary's Church and the Presbyterian Church. As the tornado approached the coast, it destroyed various dwellings and shops near the ship-yard. The bridge that crosses Bouctouche River in the town was also destroyed alongside the new school.

The number of people killed in the tornado ranges depending on the source; however, the general number ranges from five to eight fatalities with the tornado injuring many. In addition to the number of people injured and killed, the amount of destroyed dwellings resulted in many being homeless.

The damage costs were estimated around US$100,000, which was a very high figure at the time.

== See also ==
- Tornadoes in Atlantic Canada
- List of Canadian tornadoes and tornado outbreaks
