= Lovell's Newfoundland Directory =

Lovell's Province of Newfoundland Directory for 1871 also known as Lovell's Newfoundland Directory is a collection of work by John Lovell of Montreal to capture the names and business men and other inhabitants in the cities, towns and villages throughout the province of Newfoundland. The directory has become a valuable source for the study of genealogy and early settlers of Newfoundland.

Lovell, a Montreal printer and publisher, produced a 2,562 page Lovell's Canadian Dominion Directory which ultimately became the genesis for individual provincial supplements. At the time Newfoundland was not a province of Canada, Lovell still named his work as Lovell's Province of Newfoundland Directory for 1871. The directory also included a listing of current newspapers and periodicals as well as railroad and steamship routes.

Each settlement was given a brief description which was followed by the names and principle occupation of heads of houses using the 1869 census population counts. The work is cited in much of the community history of Joey Smallwood's Encyclopedia of Newfoundland and Labrador. The directory was republished by the Genealogical Research Library of London, Ontario in 1984 with the addition of a community index.

== Contents ==
From page 2 to page 82 it devotes full page spreads to advertisers followed by the preface on page 83. The general index of communities are on page 85 with the next page as 88, pages 86 and 87 are not identified. A miscellaneous index on page 89 lists the locations in the book of such things as, British Ambassadors, Clergy, dominion finances, Dominion departments, customs and tariffs, companies, etc.
