= Dorothy Severin =

Dorothy Sherman Severin AB, AM, PhD, FSA, OBE (born 24 March 1942) is Emeritus Professor of Literature at University of Liverpool and a Hispanist. Her research interests include cancioneros and La Celestina.

In June 2009, she was elected corresponding Fellow of the Real Academia Espanola, a distinction granted to very few foreign academics.

Originally Dorothy Sherman, she was the first wife of explorer and writer Tim Severin.

== Professional memberships ==
- Arts and Humanities Research Council (Advisor to Research Board)
- Asociación Hispánica de Literatura Medieval (Executive Committee Member)
- Asociación Internacional de Hispanistas (Board Member)
- Association of Hispanists of Great Britain and Ireland (Member)
- Convivio (Cancioneristas) (Board Member)
- HEFCE RAE Sub-Panel (Vice Chair)
- Modern Humanities Research Association (Board Member)
- Royal Society for the Arts (Member)
- Society of Antiquaries of London (Fellow)
- Women in Spanish, Portuguese, and Latin-American Studies (WISPS) (Founder Member)

== Publications ==
- "The relationship between the Libro de Buen Amor and Celestina: Does Trotaconventos Perform a Philocaptio Spell on Dona Endrina?" In: Louise M. Haywood and Louise O. Vasvari eds. A Companion to the Libro de Buen Amor Tamesis pp. 123–27 (2004)
- Del manuscrito a la imprenta en la epoca de Isabel la Catolica. Kassel: Reichenberger (2004)
- "Politica y poesia en la corte de Isabel la Catolica". In: Pedro Pinero eds. Dejar hablar a los textos: homenaje a Francisco Marquez University of Seville pp. 239–48 (2005)
- "Celestina's Audience, from Manuscript to Print" In: Ottavio Di Camillo and John O'Neill eds. Selected Papers from the International Congress in Commemoration of the Quincentennial Anniversary of La Celestina Hispanic Seminary of Medieval Studies pp. 197–205 (2005)
- Religious Parody and the Spanish Sentimental Romance. Newark Delaware: Juan de la Cuesta (2005)
- "15th Century Spanish Literary Conjurations and their Relationship to Lucan's Pharsalia VI." In: Charles Burnett, Jill Kraye, WF Ryan eds. Magic and the Classical Tradition Warburg Institute-Nino Aragno Editore pp. 213–22 (2006)
- "The sepultura de Macias by San Pedro--but which San Pedro?" In: Dru Doherty eds. Medieval and Renaissance Spain and Portugal. Studies in Honor of Arthur L-F Askins Tamesis pp. 301–08 (2006)
- An electronic corpus of 15th-century Castilian cancionero manuscripts. Liverpool/Birmingham: University of Liverpool; SD-Editions (2007) Dorothy Severin, Fiona Maguire, Manuel Moreno, Barbara Bordalejo
