= Offer Wadham Lighthouse =

Lighthouse in Newfoundland and Labrador, Canada

- Location: Wadham Islands; Newfoundland and Labrador; Canada
- Coordinates: 49°35′36.3″N 53°45′46.7″W

Tower
- Constructed: 1858 (first)
- Construction: brick and limestone encased in concrete tower (first) steel skeletal tower (current)
- Automated: 1990s
- Height: 12 metres (39 ft) (first); 6 metres (20 ft) (current)
- Shape: octagonal tower lantern removed (first) square tower
- Markings: unpainted tower (first)
- Power source: solar power
- Operator: Canadian Coast Guard

Light
- First lit: 1990s (current)
- Deactivated: 1990s (first)
- Focal height: 30.5 metres (100 ft)
- Range: 6 nautical miles (11 km; 6.9 mi)
- Characteristic: Fl W 3s.

The Offer Wadham Lighthouse is an active lighthouse in Newfoundland and Labrador, Canada, was lit for the first time on October 4, 1858. It was built after many petitions were sent to the government arguing for a light on the island to help guide mariners. This arose especially after the "Spring of the Wadhams" in 1852, when more than 40 sealing vessels were crushed and abandoned in the ice near Offer Wadham Island and several crew members escaped by climbing over cliffs to find shelter.

== Keepers ==
The first lighthouse keeper was Thomas Hennessey and his assistant was Edward Reddy. Charles Prowse was appointed keeper in November 1862 until 1901 and his assistants were William Hennessey, William Murphy, Peter Woods, and Robert Wellon. Other lighthouse keepers on the island were:

- Thomas Hennessey 1857–1863
- Charles Prowse 1863–1899
- Elias Abbott 1899–1904
- Stephen Abbot 1905–1908
- William Pomeroy 1909–1916
- James Ford Mouland 1916–1936
- Arch Way, Walter Hicks at least 1941–at least 194)

== Description ==
The lighthouse is described in the Newfoundland Almanac as a steady, fixed, white 4th-order dioptric burning on a circular brick tower at an arc of 360 degrees with a 2-wick concentric lamp. It was 100 feet (30 m) above sea level and could be seen at about 15 nautical miles (28 km; 17 mi).

== See also ==
- List of lighthouses in Newfoundland and Labrador
- List of lighthouses in Canada
