= Partridge Bay =

Natural bay in Newfoundland and Labrador, Canada

Location in Newfoundland and Labrador

Partridge Bay is a natural bay on the coast of Labrador in the province of Newfoundland and Labrador, Canada.

It lies to the north of Rocky Bay and to the south of Shoal Bay, with several small uninhabited islands across its entrance from the Labrador Sea.
