= Abbotts Cove =

Settlement in Canada

Coordinates: 49.542°N 53.859°W

Location of Abbotts Cove in Newfoundland and Labrador

Abbotts Cove is a settlement in Newfoundland and Labrador. It is located upon Peckford Island, the largest member of a small chain known as the Wadham Islands or Outer Wadham Group.

Between May 1976 and June 1977, historian and explorer Tim Severin recreated the seven-year voyage to a new land across the Atlantic Ocean and back described in the medieval Latin text Navigatio Sancti Brendani Abbatis (The Voyage of St. Brendan the Abbot). At the end of their 4,500 mile (7,200 km) passage, Severin and his crew first made landfall at Peckford Island. The project is detailed in Severin's 1978 book The Brendan Voyage.
