= Doting Cove =

Community in Canada

Coordinates: 49.433°N 53.950°W

Doting Cove and Ragged Harbour.

== Geography ==
Located on the Straight Shore of Newfoundland, Ragged Harbour is to the west of Musgrave Harbour and Doting Cove is to the east. Ragged Harbour got its name from the appearance of its harbour which is filled with rocks and coves, thus giving it a 'ragged' look.

== History ==
The 1836 Newfoundland Census records a family of five living in Ragged Harbour, it was the family of Jack Mullins. Soon after the Bemisters and Pinsents settled in Ragged Harbour. One of the Bemisters of Ragged Harbour, Simeon, was a crew member on the Belle Hadden which was built in Ragged Harbour and was used to take produce to mining towns.

Doting Cove had its first settlers by 1850, some of the families were the Abbotts, Cuffs, Haywards, Hickses, and Moulands. Just seven years later the population had reached 102 in Doting Cove. Many of the settlers would go to the Wadham Islands to fish during the summer season. In the 1900s Doting Cove was a supporter of the Fisherman's Protective Union and by 1912 a Union Trading Co. store was opened there.

Ragged Harbour and Doting Cove by 1884 were both almost entirely Methodist. However the Salvation Army made converts in Doting Cove first in the 1890s and the majority of Doting Cove's population became Salvation Army by the 1930s.

The 1911 census records Doting Cove's population as 458 and Ragged Harbours as 49. Since Doting Cove, Ragged Harbour and Musgrave Harbour were incorporated their population has remained near 1000 throughout the 1900s.

== Census Information ==
- Ragged Harbour

	1869	1857	1874
population	11	9	10
inhabited houses	2	2	2
families	2	2	2
Church of England	11	9	10
people catching/curing fish	2	2	3
seamen/fishermen	2	2	3
total boats	1	-	1
nets/seines	9	9	9
salmon caught/cured (tres)	-	4	21
cod fish cured (qtls)	-	-	4
fishing rooms in use	2	-	2
stores/barns/outhouses	2	1	2
swine	2	-	1
barrels of potatoes produced	46	21	18

- Doting Cove

	1874
population	247
inhabited houses	33
families	38
Wesleyan	247
can read/write	61
attending school	56
not attending school	67
nets/seines	53
catching/curing fish	64
seamen/fishermen	48
total boats	35
cod fish cured (qtls)	2362
herring (brls)	112
fishing rooms in use	21
stores/barns/outhouses	27
oil (galls)	2712
cattle/cow	23
horses	7
sheep	17
swine/goats	74
tons of hay	23 1/4
barrels of potatoes	867
barrels of turnip	20
barrels of root crop	1

== See also ==
- List of communities in Newfoundland and Labrador
