= Clarke's Head =

Coordinates: 49°18′00″N 54°29′57″W

Clarke's Head, Newfoundland is the first community on the north side of the mouth of the Gander River. A small community, which joined with several other small communities, to form Gander Bay.

== History ==
Clarke's Head is located near Gander in Gander Bay, Newfoundland. This lumbering community is said to have been populated by Aboriginals until European settlers moved near the community in the 19th century. People came to Clarke's Head for the salmon fishery and farming was important as well. In 1869 the Census of Newfoundland recorded a population of 69. In 1883 Clarke's Head had a road built leading to Victoria Cove, and by 1890 they had started exploiting timber. By 1935 Clarke's Head had a population over 300 with logging as the main source of employment.

== Church history ==
There is records that show a school was operating in Clarke's Head in the late 19th century. In 1869 there were 61 members of the Church of England and 8 Roman Catholics. In 1905 a Church of England church was built, and a Roman Catholic church was also built.

== Census information ==
	1869
Population	69
Church of England	61
Church of Rome	8
People catching/Curing fish	19
Seamen/Fishermen	15
Inhabited houses	9
Stores/barns/outhouses	15
Fishing rooms in use	3
Oxen/Cows	12
Swine	1
Tons of hay	6
Barrels of Potatoes	221
Barrels of Turnip	1
Total # of Boats	2
Nets and Seines	37

== Directory ==
- Lovell's Directory describes Clarke's Head as a small fishing settlement in the Fogo Island-Cape Freels district with a population of 70. The names that are listed are:

- John Bursey, Fisherman
- Richard Bursey, Fisherman
- Charles Francis
- James Gillingham, Fisherman
- Nathaniel Gillingham, Fisherman
- Robert Gillingham, Fisherman
- William Gillingham, Fisherman
- John Harris, Fisherman

== See also ==
- List of communities in Newfoundland and Labrador
