= Cape Freels =

Headland on the island of Newfoundland, Canada

Coordinates: 49°15′18.41″N 53°27′44.21″W

Location of Cape Freels in Newfoundland

Cape Freels is a headland on the island of Newfoundland, in the province of Newfoundland and Labrador, Canada, and the location of a community of the same name. This cape, located at the northern extremity of Bonavista Bay, is not to be confused with another Cape Freels which is located at the southern extremity of the Avalon Peninsula of Newfoundland.

The cape was named Ilha de Freyluis as early as 1506. The Portuguese translation is a derivation of the island of Brother Lewis. The area around the cape is the location of a Beothuk camping site. Radiocarbon dating of the artifacts place them between AD 200–700.

For navigational safety a gas lamp was erected at Gull Island, Cape Freels in 1924.

'Cape Freels Coastline and Cabot Island' is designated as an Important Bird Area by BirdLife International. The area provides important nesting habitat for seabirds such as Common Eider, Common Murre, Razorbill, Common Tern, and Arctic Tern.
