= Main Point-Davidsville =

Local service district in Newfoundland and Labrador

Coordinates: 49.361°N 54.433°W

Location of Main Point-Davidsville in Newfoundland and Labrador

Main Point-Davidsville is a local service district and designated place in the Canadian province of Newfoundland and Labrador. It consists of the communities of Main Point and Davidsville.

== Geography ==
Main Point-Davidsville is in Newfoundland within Subdivision L of Division No. 8.

== Demographics ==
As a designated place in the 2016 Census of Population conducted by Statistics Canada, Main Point-Davidsville recorded a population of 302 living in 135 of its 157 total private dwellings, a change of −6.5% from its 2011 population of 323. With a land area of 28.61 km^{2} (11.05 sq mi), it had a population density of 10.6/km^{2} (27.3/sq mi) in 2016.

== Government ==
Main Point-Davidsville is a local service district (LSD) that is governed by a committee responsible for the provision of certain services to the community. The chair of the LSD committee is Jeffrey Simms.

== See also ==
- List of communities in Newfoundland and Labrador
- List of designated places in Newfoundland and Labrador
- List of local service districts in Newfoundland and Labrador
