= Lakeville, New Brunswick =

Lakeville, New Brunswick may refer to:

- Lakeville, Carleton County, New Brunswick
- Lakeville, Westmorland County, New Brunswick
- Lakeville, Kent County, New Brunswick
