= Rocky Bay (Newfoundland and Labrador) =

Natural bay in Newfoundland and Labrador, Canada

Coordinates: 49.433°N 54.248°W

Rocky Bay is a natural bay off the island of Newfoundland in the province of Newfoundland and Labrador, Canada. It lies to the north of Caplin Bay and to the south of Partridge Bay, opening to the Labrador Sea.
