= Cape Freels (Avalon) =

Headland on Newfoundland, Canada

Coordinates: 46°36′39.55″N 53°33′28.85″W

Location of Cape Freels in Newfoundland

Cape Freels is a headland on the island of Newfoundland at the southern tip of the Avalon Peninsula. It is the most southerly point of land on the island of Newfoundland and hence the most southerly of the province of Newfoundland and Labrador. This cape on the Avalon Peninsula is not to be confused with another Cape Freels in Newfoundland, located at the northern extremity of Bonavista Bay. In addition, Cape Freels (Avalon) shares the distinction of being the most southerly point in Newfoundland with nearby Cape Pine, which is situated at the same latitude.
