= Horwood, Newfoundland and Labrador =

Local service district in Canada

Coordinates: 49°27′00″N 54°32′00″W

Horwood is a local service district and designated place in the Canadian province of Newfoundland and Labrador. It was formerly known as Dog Bay. It is located northeast of Lewisporte just off Route 331. It was once the home of a bustling lumber company owned by the Horwood family. Dog Bay was renamed Horwood after the family name.

== Geography ==
Horwood is in Newfoundland within Subdivision L of Division No. 8.

== Demographics ==
As a designated place in the 2016 Census of Population conducted by Statistics Canada, Horwood recorded a population of 260 living in 106 of its 124 total private dwellings, a change of 10.6% from its 2011 population of 235. With a land area of 8.8 km^{2} (3.4 sq mi), it had a population density of 29.5/km^{2} (76.5/sq mi) in 2016.

== Government ==
Horwood is a local service district (LSD) that is governed by a committee responsible for the provision of certain services to the community. The chair of the LSD committee is Violet Barnes.

== See also ==
- List of communities in Newfoundland and Labrador
- List of designated places in Newfoundland and Labrador
- List of local service districts in Newfoundland and Labrador
