= Stoneville, Newfoundland and Labrador =

Local Service District in Canada

Coordinates: 49°27′29″N 54°32′42″W

Stoneville is a local service district and designated place in the Canadian province of Newfoundland and Labrador. It is 3 km off Route 331 along Route 335.

== Geography ==
Stoneville is in Newfoundland within Subdivision L of Division No. 8.

Stoneville is one of Newfoundland's 13 locations engaged in for-profit Sea Urchin fishing and processing, employing a portion of residents in the area.

== Demographics ==
As a designated place in the 2016 Census of Population conducted by Statistics Canada, Stoneville recorded a population of 298 living in 121 of its 147 total private dwellings, a change of -6% from its 2011 population of 317. With a land area of 7.87 km^{2} (3.04 sq mi), it had a population density of 37.9/km^{2} (98.1/sq mi) in 2016.

== Government ==
Stoneville is a local service district (LSD) that is governed by a committee responsible for the provision of certain services to the community. The chair of the LSD committee is Nathaniel Osmond.

== See also ==
- List of communities in Newfoundland and Labrador
- List of designated places in Newfoundland and Labrador
- List of local service districts in Newfoundland and Labrador
