= Gander Bay =

Bay in Newfoundland and Labrador, Canada

Coordinates: 49°22′44″N 54°27′26″W

Location of Gander Bay in Newfoundland

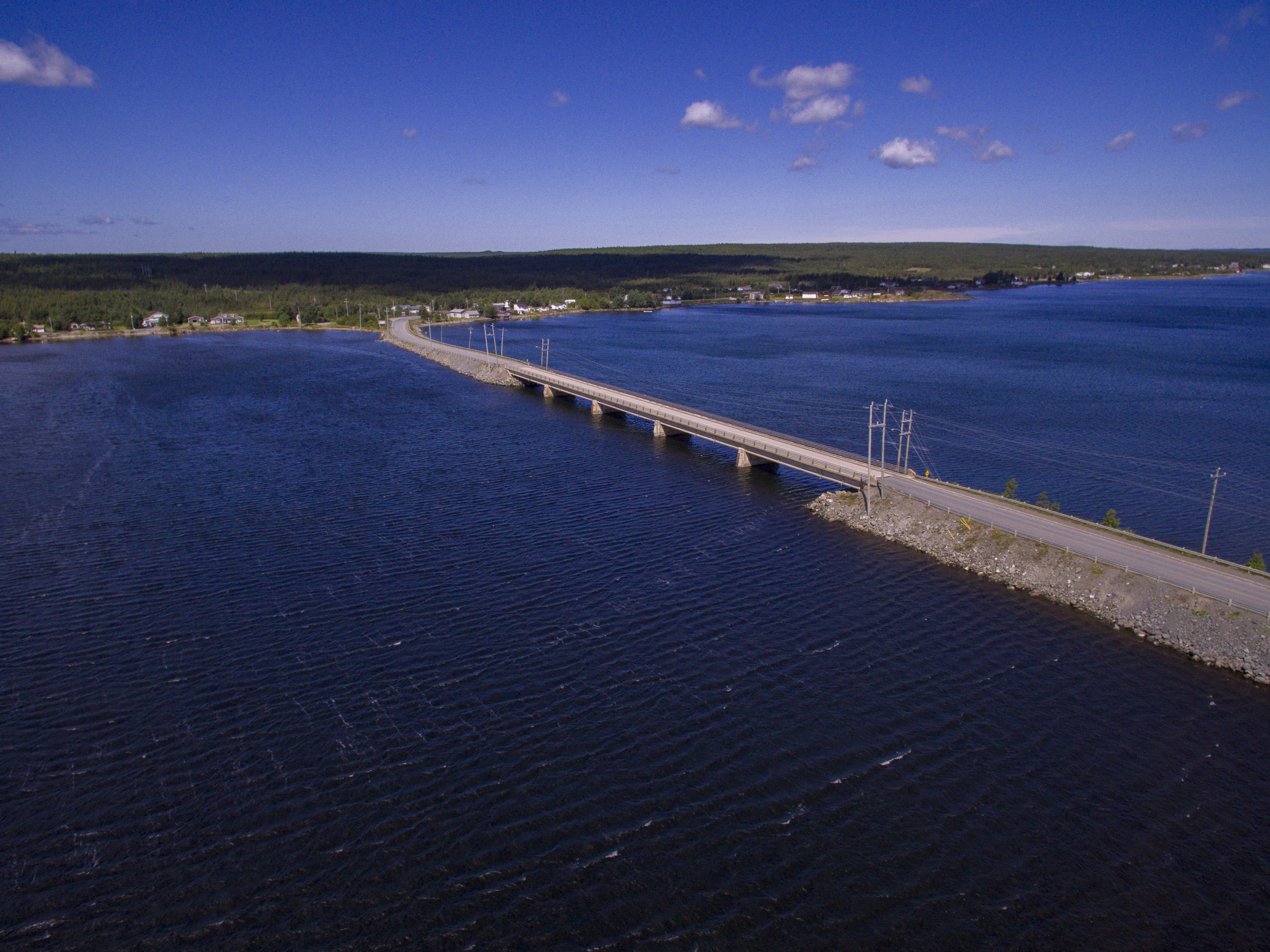
The Gander Bay Causeway, connects opposite sides of the Gander River

Gander Bay is a natural bay located on the island of Newfoundland, in the Canadian province of Newfoundland and Labrador.

Gander Bay takes its name from the lake and river which terminates within the inner reaches of this bay.

== Communities ==
- Rodgers Cove
- Wings Point
- Dormans Cove
- Clarke's Head
- Gander Bay South
- Main Point
- Davidsville
- Beaver Cove
- Victoria Cove
