= Port Albert, Newfoundland and Labrador =

Local service district in Canada

Coordinates: 49.541°N 54.533°W

Location of Port Albert in Newfoundland and Labrador

Port Albert is a local service district and designated place in the Canadian province of Newfoundland and Labrador.

== Geography ==
Port Albert is in Newfoundland within Subdivision L of Division No. 8.

== Demographics ==
As a designated place in the 2016 Census of Population conducted by Statistics Canada, Port Albert recorded a population of 66 living in 34 of its 42 total private dwellings, a change of -4.3% from its 2011 population of 69. With a land area of 3.16 km^{2} (1.22 sq mi), it had a population density of 20.9/km^{2} (54.1/sq mi) in 2016.

== Government ==
Port Albert is a local service district (LSD) that is governed by a committee responsible for the provision of certain services to the community. The chair of the LSD committee is Frank Milley.

== See also ==
- List of communities in Newfoundland and Labrador
- List of designated places in Newfoundland and Labrador
- List of local service districts in Newfoundland and Labrador
