= Frederickton, Newfoundland and Labrador =

Designated place in Canada

Coordinates: 49°25′41″N 54°21′29″W

Frederickton is a designated place in the Canadian province of Newfoundland and Labrador.

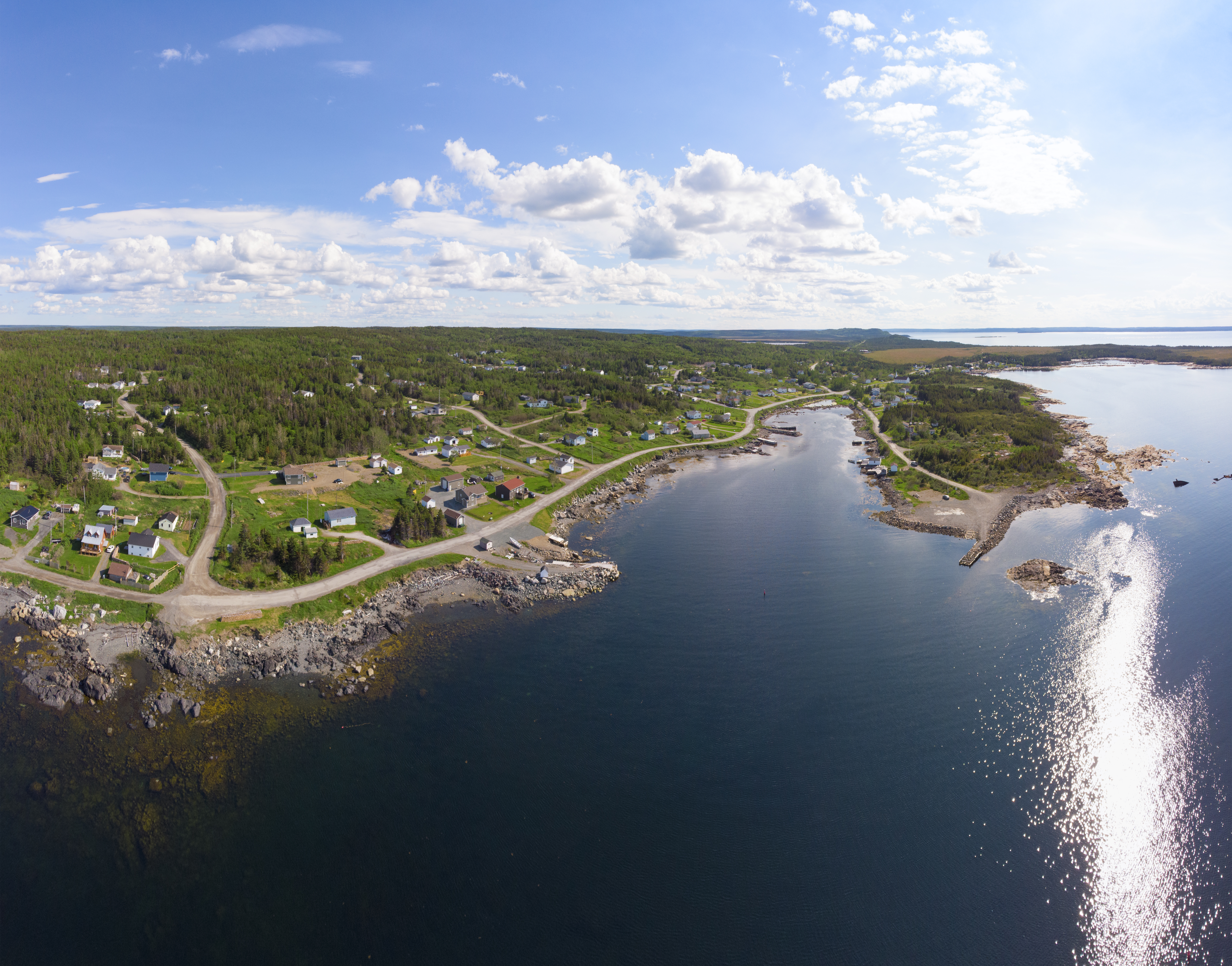
Frederickton, Newfoundland

== History ==
Formerly called Bassett's Harbour, this fishing and lumbering community was named Frederickton after 1901. Early inhabitants came from Fogo Island to use Muddy Hole's resources during the winter season, such as its forest, unoccupied lands, abundant wildlife, and fishing and birding grounds. Muddy Hole first appears in the 1845 Census with a population of 45; by 1857 the population had reached 150. The growth in Muddy Hole was its advantageous location for the seal hunt and cod fishery. By the 1950s Frederickton was a lobster-fishing area with some logging as well. In 1951 the population was 235 and by 1966 it was 346.

Church history

The first inhabitants of Frederickton were Church of England and there were a small number of Roman Catholics as well, in the 1840s. In the 1857 Census there was a record of Wesleyans in the community. In 1857 there was a Methodist school and by the early 1900s a Methodist church was constructed in Frederickton.

In 1860 some resident fishermen of Muddy Hole were James Bonnall, George Clark, Richard Hipditch, and Thomas King.

== Geography ==
Frederickton is in Newfoundland within Subdivision L of Division No. 8.

Frederickton is located on the southwest shore of Muddy Hole, north of Carmanville on the point of an open, exposed harbour. The rocky, low stretch of coastline, the shallow waters in the bay and the exposure to harsh weather can be dangerous for boats. For example, the H.M. Mosdell overturned in November 1908 due to strong wind and six men drowned. However, Frederickton's position created an excellent base for the seal hunt and cod fishery which was the basis of its growth and economy. Frederickton is also located close to excellent fishing and birding areas and has agricultural potential.

== Demographics ==
As a designated place in the 2016 Census of Population conducted by Statistics Canada, Frederickton recorded a population of 221 living in 107 of its 124 total private dwellings, a change of −12.6% from its 2011 population of 253. With a land area of 1.82 km^{2} (0.70 sq mi), it had a population density of 121.4/km^{2} (314.5/sq mi) in 2016.

== See also ==
- List of communities in Newfoundland and Labrador
- List of designated places in Newfoundland and Labrador
