= Rodgers Cove =

Coordinates: 49°18′00″N 54°29′57″W

Rodgers Cove is a settlement located northeast of Lewisporte. The first postmistress in 1966 was Phyllis Ludlow.

== See also ==
- List of communities in Newfoundland and Labrador
- List of people of Newfoundland and Labrador
