= Encyclopedia of Newfoundland and Labrador =

Canadian encyclopedia

Encyclopedia of Newfoundland and Labrador is an encyclopedia commissioned by Joey Smallwood to capture the people, places, events and history of the province of Newfoundland and Labrador. Smallwood's view on the purpose of the encyclopedia was summed up in his remark

Every theme belongs in the Encyclopedia. Every person, every event, every location, every institution, every development, every industry, every intellectual activity, every religious movement in Newfoundland belongs in there.

— Joseph Roberts Smallwood

The work took nearly thirteen years to complete and contains 5 volumes containing over 3,900 pages by more than 200 authors. The first volume was printed in 1981 with volume two released in 1984. Smallwood had suffered a stroke two months after volume two was released. The work was suspended until 1987 when the Joseph R. Smallwood Foundation was established with a mandate to complete the five volume encyclopedia. Volume five was published in 1994. Marketing of the volumes is by The Institute of Social and Economic Research of Memorial University with proceeds going toward the J. R. Smallwood Centre for Newfoundland Studies.
