= Sir Charles Hamilton Sound =

Body of water in Newfoundland and Labrador

- Hamilton Sound (English)
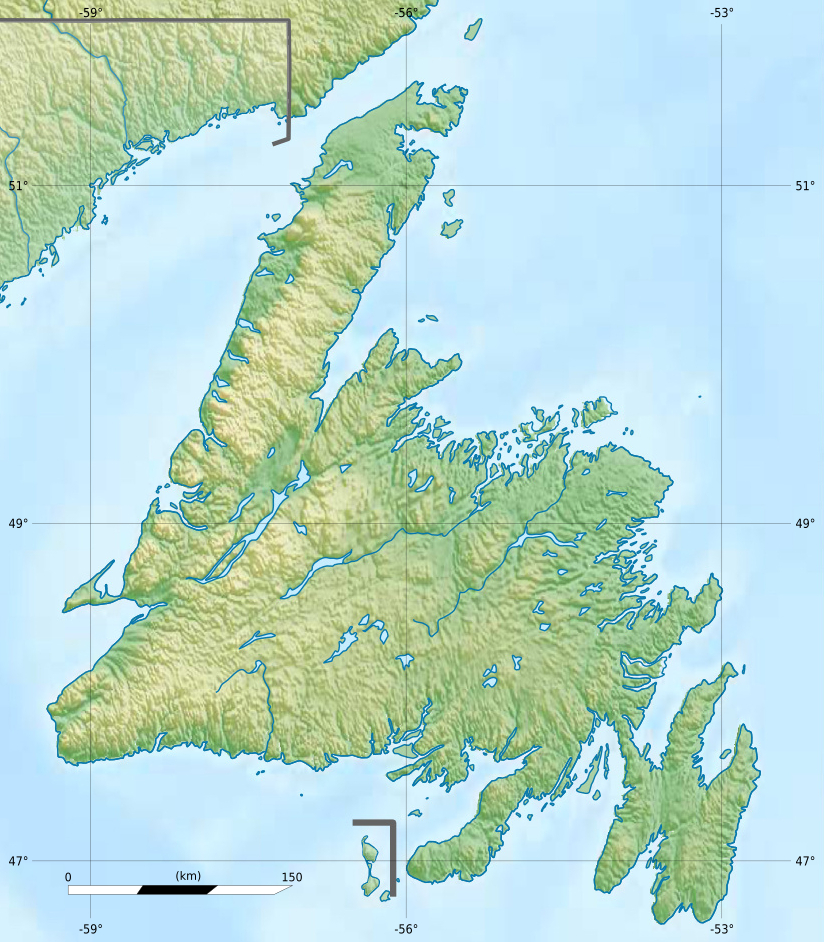
- Location within Newfoundland
- Location: Newfoundland
- Coordinates: 49°33′N 54°07′W
- Etymology: Named in honour of Sir Charles Hamilton
- Ocean/sea sources: Atlantic

Sir Charles Hamilton Sound, which has been shortened to and is more commonly known as Hamilton Sound, is a body of water on the northeast coast of the island of Newfoundland, between Fogo Island and the mainland to the south, and including (from west to east) Dog Bay, Gander Bay, and Rocky Bay.

The western half of Hamilton Sound is dotted with a number of islands, with the largest group being the Indian Islands. At the east end of Hamilton Sound lie the Wadham Islands. The Gander River is the largest river to empty into Hamilton Sound through Gander Bay. The native peoples of Newfoundland, the Beothuk, are presumed to have used the Gander River to gain access to the rich bird population on the many islands that dot Hamilton Sound.

The sound, and many of the bays that make up Hamilton Sound, was first frequented by Europeans in the eighteenth century. By the late 1700s the salmon fishery was very well established and operated by Trinity-Poole merchants such as Benjamin Lester and Thomas Street. During the 1820s, when many of the bays were being settled, Hamilton Sound was named after Sir Charles Hamilton who had served as Commodore Governor from 1818 to 1825. The many communities in and around Hamilton Sound were largely settled in the period from 1840 to 1870 by settlers from Fogo in the western section, and in the eastern section, in communities such as Musgrave Harbour, settlers arrived from the Bonavista Bay and Conception Bay areas.

Hamilton Sound was used to name the ferry which travelled the route from Farewell to Change Islands and Fogo Island. It was a 387-ton vessel built in Quebec in 1968. After decommissioning from the ferry run and sold in 2015, it was then named Norcon Galatea.
