= Gander River =

River in Newfoundland and Labrador, Canada

Coordinates: 49°15′47″N 54°29′43″W

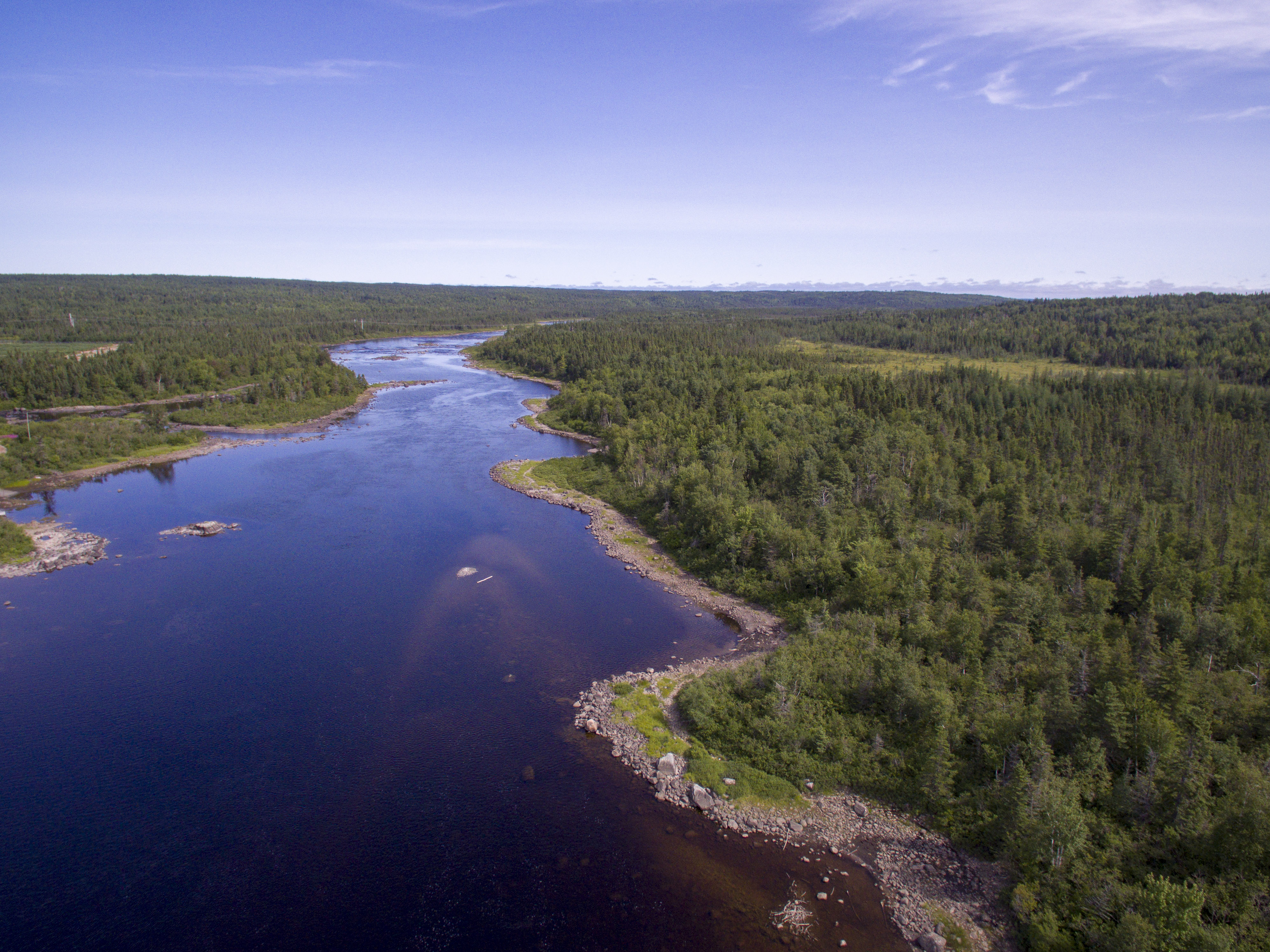
The Gander River, as viewed near the community of Glenwood, Newfoundland.

The Gander River is a river in eastern Newfoundland, Canada. It is 110 miles (177 km) long and originates at Partridgeberry Hill, south of Grand Falls-Windsor. The river then flows northeast to Gander Lake and on to Gander Bay on the Atlantic Ocean.

== See also ==
- List of rivers of Newfoundland and Labrador
