= Cape Freels, Newfoundland and Labrador =

Community in Newfoundland and Labrador, Canada

Coordinates: 49.233°N 53.517°W

Cape Freels is one of the communities that comprise an area (also known as Cape Freels) on the northeast coast of the Island of Newfoundland, called Bonavista North, in the province of Newfoundland and Labrador, Canada. These communities have a shared history in that they were settled by people from England, predominantly from the West Country - Dorset, Devon, Somerset and Hampshire.

== History ==
Cape Freels, on the northern point of Bonavista Bay, Newfoundland, is said to have been visited as early as 1506. It also has one of the earliest known Beothuk sites on the island. Originally, European settlers went to Middle Bill Cove and by 1836 there were 67 people living there. The settlement relied on a small local cod fishing industry and seals. On Gull Island, Cape Freels in 1924, a gas lamp was erected to help aid mariners with their navigation. In 1961 the population of Cape Freels and Cape Freels South was 157 and the population of Cape Freels North was 179. In 1963 Cape Freels received electricity and still depended on the local fishery and Labrador fishery. In 1966 there were 341 people in Cape Freels, by 1976 there were only 95.

== Church History ==
In 1836, 35 of the 46 inhabitants in Cape Freels were Church of England and eleven were Roman Catholic. Although there was no church at this time, missionaries from other communities would visit there. For example, the first missionary stationed at Greenspond, Rev N.A. Coster records visiting Cape Freels as early as 1832. By 1845, with a population of only 80 people, a Church of England church and school was built and had an initial enrolment of 51 pupils. In 1844 Mr. Thomas Parker became the school master and taught there for more than 20 years. In 1857 113 if the 121 inhabitants were Church of England. By 1869, however, only nine people were of the Church of England, five were Roman Catholic, and 177 were Methodists.

== Census Information ==
	1836	1845	1857	1869	1874
population	66	80	121	161	191
inhabited houses	7	7	20	23	27
Church of England	51	71	113	143	9
Roman Catholic	15	9	8	3	5
Wesleyans	-	-	-	15	177
No. Churches	-	1 (Ch. of Eng)	1		
No. of Schools	-	1	1		
students	-	51	45	39	45
who can read/write	-	-	-	73	86
total boats	6	7	23	14	12
boats built	-	-	2	-	-
potatoes produced	455 bus.	140 barrels	405 bars.	533 bars.	409 bars.
barrels of turnip	-	-	22	53	81
swine/goats	-	-	35	66	93
horses	-	-	-	4	5
nets and seines	-	47	25	13	36
people catching/curing fish	-	-	100	48	86
seamen and fishermen	-	-	32	-	29
cod fish cured (qtls)	-	-	3100	-	2200
stores/barns/outhouses	-	-	14	10	13
fishing rooms in use	-	-	13	11	12
vessels in seal fishery	-	-	4	5	1
men on board	-	-	40	35	10
tonnage in fishery	-	-	158	129	35
seals caught	-	-	463	-	40
seal nets	-	-	54	37	21

== Directories ==
- Hutchinson's Newfoundland Directory for 1864 lists some of the inhabitants of Middle Bill Cove:

- James Houlahan, Planter
- Patrick Humphries, Planter
- Thomas Parker, Teacher
- John Ridout, Planter
- John Stokes, Planter
- William Yetman, Planter

- Lovell's Newfoundland Directory for 1871 describes Middle Bill Cove as the most northern settlement in the Bonavista district, distant from Greenspond about 15 miles by boat and a population of 161. The people listed are:

- William Brown, Fisherman
- Davis Butchers, Fisherman
- Cornelius Cook, Planter
- William Cook, Fisherman
- Mark Garrett, Fisherman
- Alfreal Gaulton, Fisherman
- John Hann, Planter
- William Hann, Fisherman
- Harvey Harvey, Fisherman
- James Hollohn, Fisherman
- George Humphrey, Fisherman
- Jonas Humphrey, Fisherman
- Thomas Parker
- Jacob Ridout, Planter
- James Ridout, Planter
- John Ridout, Planter
- Peter Ridout, Planter
- William Ridout, Fisherman
- Arthur Robert, Fisherman
- Job Stokes, Fisherman
- John Stokes Jr., Fisherman
- John Stokes Sr., Fisherman
- William Yetman, Fisherman

== Interesting facts ==
- In the 1840s, John Ridout, W. Hands, and R. Vincent were on the board of Road Commissioners for Cape Freels to Cobbler's Island.
- In 1865 Thomas Fish Parker of Middle Bill Cove, Cape Freels petitioned for a bridge over the river at Arthur's Gut and James Roach of Middle Bill Cove wanted a grant to open a road from the beach to their farms.
- In 1887 William Lang was the surveyor of shipping from Salvage to Cape Freels; Henry Robins was the commissioner of wrecked property for Cape Freels to Cape Farewell; and Cape Freels way office in 1887 was William Hann.

== See also ==
- List of communities in Newfoundland and Labrador
