= Newtown, Newfoundland and Labrador =

Community in Newfoundland and Labrador

Coordinates: 49°12′19″N 53°31′19″W

Newtown is a part of the Municipality of New-Wes-Valley, located at the North end of Bonavista Bay in the province of Newfoundland and Labrador, Canada. The approximate population is 400. Settlement in Newtown originated around 1850 when people relocated from nearby areas. Newtown is well known for being built on many small islands, and is the home of the Barbour Living Heritage Village.

== History ==
Newtown was once known as Inner Pinchard's Island or Inner Islands because of its close proximity to Pinchard's Island, where most of Newtown's settlers first came from. The first family names recorded in Newtown were the Blackmores, Halls, and Norris'. Newtown was combined with Pinchard's Island in the Newfoundland Census until the 1874 Census. In 1884 there were 382 people living in Newtown, mainly working in the Labrador fishery and the seal fishery. In 1892 the operator of the local lobster factory, John Haddon, announced the community was changing its name to Newtown. However, the name of the post office remained Inner Islands until 1903. With the collapse of the Labrador fishery in the 1930s, the population began to decline. The population in 1921 was 632 but by 1940 it was almost half, at 359. After several years and with people leaving smaller nearby areas, many people moved to Newtown and the population began to grow again. In 1992 the community of Newtown amalgamated with Wesleyville and Badger's Quay-Valleyfield-Pool's Island.

== Church history ==
A Church of England school-chapel was built by 1880 in Newtown and a Methodist school-chapel opened in 1885. In 1884 124 of the 382 people in Newtown were Methodist, in 1889 there were 160 Methodists and by 1921 there were 275 Methodists. St.Luke's Church of England church was consecrated in Newtown in 1895, and Newtown became the center of church life for surrounding communities with the establishment of the Methodist circuit there in 1912.

== Education history ==
The first record of schooling in Newtown was with a Mrs. Collins, who kept a school for those who could not go to Pinchard's Island, in 1878. A Church of England school-chapel was constructed in 1889 and a Methodist one by 1885.

== The Barbour Family ==
Two of the early Barbers/Barbours in Newfoundland, George (1746–1818) and Joseph (1751–1818) Barbour arrived in Greenspond sometime prior to 1792, and later settled on Cobbler's Island after 1809. Joseph's son Benjamin Barbour (1808–1891) had eleven children. Five of them, Joseph, William, Thomas, George and James, were well-known sealing captains. Edward and Samuel formed the E&S Barbour firm. The Barbours came to Newtown in the early 1870s, upon which time some of them became sealing captains. The first was Captain Joe Barbour (1842–1890) and the most prominent being Captain George Barbour (1858–1928). George Barbour was born on Cobbler's Island and his first steamer was the Walrus in 1893, and his last was the Beothic II in 1928. Although Captain George Barbour had many successes, he was also faced with some tragedy. The Greenland Disaster of 1898 cost the lives of several of George Barbours men. The names of those men from Pinchard's Island and Newtown were: George Bungay, James Cheeks, Isaac Green, George Norris, Herbert Norris, Walter Norris, Kenneth Parsons, and Henry Curtis.

Because of Benjamin Barbour and Sons and E&S Barbour firm (established 1893), Newtown became an important mercantile center. The Barbour family of Newtown, through their efforts and successes, brought much to the community of Newtown in its early years and continues to do so today. The Barbour House in Newtown was constructed in 1874 by Benjamin Barbour, a schooner-owner and master-mariner. It has 32 rooms and is an important tourist attraction in Newtown today.

== Census information ==
  - The 1869 Census includes both Pinchard's Island and Inner Island (Newtown). Newtown appears in the 1874 Census as Pinchard's Island Inner Tickles.

	1869	1874
population	457	167
Church of England	389	112
Roman Catholic	19	-
Wesleyan	49	25
Churches	1 (Church of England)	
Clergy/ministers	1	
people catching/curing fish	165	103
seamen/fishermen	-	34
who can read/write	184	72
attending school	23	
inhabited houses	53	19
families	73	28
stores/barns/outhouses	22	14
fishing rooms in use	18	11
Oxen/cows	9	
sheep	40	
swine/goats	22	60
tons of hay	6	
barrels of potatoes	648	267
barrels of turnips	51	25
butter manufactured	40	
vessels in seal fishery	11	7
men on board	86	48
tonnage	287	159
total # boats	28	7
nets and seines	95	58
seal nets	151	25
cod fish cured (qtls)	-	3433
Oil produced (galls)	-	2108
seals caught	-	3200

== Directory information ==
- Newtown appears in Lovell's Directory for 1871 as "Inner Islands" and is described as a group of islands on the north side of Bonavista Bay which is difficult to access. It is distant from Greenspond by 10 miles in boat and has a population of 141. The names listed are:

- Benjamin Barbour, Planter
- Patrick Blackmore, Fisherman
- William Bungey, Fisherman
- Edward Efferton, Planter
- John Efferton, Planter
- John Hall, Planter
- Leon Norrys, Planter
- James Parsons, Fisherman
- Mrs. Orpha Parsons, Widow
- Thomas Perry, Fisherman
- Francis Sainsburry, Planter
- George Sainsburry, Planter
- John Sainsburry, Planter
- John Tulk, Planter
- James Way, Fisherman

== See also ==
- List of communities in Newfoundland and Labrador
- Bonavista Bay
- Bonavista Peninsula
- Newfoundland (island)
- Newfoundland and Labrador
