= Carmanville =

Carmanville Rocky Bay
- Town
- Location of Carmanville in Newfoundland
- Coordinates: 49°24′15″N 54°17′20″W
- Country: Canada
- Province: Newfoundland and Labrador
- Settled: 1825

Government
  - Mayor: Marilyn Tulk
  - Fire Chief: Nathanael White

Area
  - Land: 43.08 km^{2} (16.63 sq mi)

Population (2021)
  - Total: 784
  - Density: 17.2/km^{2} (45/sq mi)
- Time zone: UTC-3:30 (Newfoundland Time)
  - Summer (DST): UTC-2:30 (Newfoundland Daylight)
- Area code: 709
- Highways: Route 330; Route 332
- Website: townofcarmanville.ca

Carmanville is a Canadian community in the province of Newfoundland and Labrador.

== History ==
Carmanville, on the northeastern coast of Newfoundland, was first settled by John Day, from Twillingate, and his family. The Day family trapped otter and fox and became friends with an Indigenous family living there. Carmanville was originally called Rocky Bay, and in the 1845 Census Rocky Bay was recorded to have a population of eleven, all Church of England. It was not until the 1880s that the population began to increase. In 1874, the population was 15, ten years later it was 171, with mostly Methodists. The inhabitants fished, gardened, and raised animals for a living. By 1900, there were 402 inhabitants. Rocky Bay was changed to Carmanville on June 18, 1906, after the General Superintendent of the Methodist Church of Canada, Rev. Albert Carman. By 1966, the population was 938 and lumbering had also become an important source of employment; especially for shipbuilding. Logging, lobster, cod, and the Labrador fishery were all important to Carmanville's economy.

== Church history ==
The 1836 Census show the population at Rocky Bay as being Protestant Episcopalians and later as Church of England. By 1869, there were 18 Church of England and 9 Wesleyans living there. As most of the inhabitants were Methodists by 1884, a clergyman and teacher were present and they began working on a school and church. A Methodist church opened in April 1897 which served for 25 years. Some ministers who served there between 1885 and 1904 were Cheeseman, Rex, Skinner, Jefferson, Abraham, Stoney, Indoe, Hoskins, Stoney, Bartlett, Saint, Dean, Bennett, and Coppin.

== Education ==
Early education in Carmanville was divided up between Roman Catholic and Protestant schools with little help from the colonial government. The first school began in 1887 under the school board and Methodist Education Council. It was a one-room school with a capacity of 50 students. When it opened there were 34 students taught by Mr. Solomon Whiteway from Musgrave Harbour. They eventually outgrew the one room school-chapel and in 1904 a new, larger, two-room school was built on church property. In 1900, 49 students were enrolled in school; by 1902, there were 60 and 81 in 1903. Enrolments and regular attendance fluctuated.

== Demographics ==
In the 2021 Census of Population conducted by Statistics Canada, Carmanville had a population of 784 living in 355 of its 457 total private dwellings, a change of 5.9% from its 2016 population of 740. With a land area of 42.68 km^{2} (16.48 sq mi), it had a population density of 18.4/km^{2} (47.6/sq mi) in 2021.

== Directory information ==
- Lovell's Newfoundland Directory

Carmanville is a small fishing settlement in the Twillingate and Fogo district on the straight shore. Its population in 1871 was 27.

== Interesting facts ==
- Carmanville appeared on maps as early as 1784 as "Baie des Roches" and in 1794 as Rocky Bay.
- Robert Shelly of Rocky Bay was on the board of road commissioners in the mid-to-late 19th century.
- Scammel, Camel, and Hicks were the names on the outport board for Rocky Bay in the 1880s. By the 1890s, the names of members were Russel, Perry, Hicks, and Chaulk.

== See also ==
- Aunt Martha's Sheep
- List of cities and towns in Newfoundland and Labrador
