= Victoria Cove =

Coordinates: 49°21′N 54°31′W

Victoria Cove, Newfoundland is situated on the west side of Gander Bay, near the town of Gander.

Victoria Cove was originally called Little House Cove and was visited since the mid-19th century by fishermen who would do woods work in the winter. Permanent settlement did not begin until 1894 and the first settler is believed to have been Richard Bursey. Other family names that came to Victoria Cove in the 19th century, mostly from Fogo and Change Islands, were:

- Bursey
- Gillingham
- Hodder
- King
- Mercer
- Oake
- Porter
- Reccord
- Torraville
- Webb

John Wesley Webb, one of the first settlers in Victoria Cove is said to have chosen the name Victoria Cove in 1896 to honour the Queen.

In 1898 the first school-chapel was built, and a real church building was started in 1903 but was destroyed by fire. A Church of England church was built by 1910.

Victoria Cove was first recorded in the 1911 Census with a population of 140. The first business was opened by Esau Record in 1920. The population decreased as the Labrador and local fishery decreased. Population was 250 in 1956.

Until the 1930s Victoria Cove was a fishing community, fishing primarily on the Labrador. Cutting lumber increased when Horwood Lumber Co. had a major lumber mill in Dog Bay, a nearby community.

== See also ==
- List of communities in Newfoundland and Labrador
- Monarchy in Newfoundland and Labrador
- Royal eponyms in Canada
