= Main Point, Newfoundland and Labrador =

Settlement in Newfoundland and Labrador, Canada

Coordinates: 49.320°N 54.424°W

Location of Main Point in Newfoundland and Labrador

Main Point is a settlement in Newfoundland and Labrador. It is part of Main Point-Davidsville. As of 2023, it has a population of around 350 people.
