= Gander Bay South =

Local service district in Newfoundland and Labrador, Canada

Coordinates: 49.272°N 54.488°W

Location of Gander Bay South in Newfoundland and Labrador

Gander Bay South is a local service district and designated place in the Canadian province of Newfoundland and Labrador. Gander Bay was a small place in the Fogo and Twillingate area in 1864. It was north of Gander. The way office opened in 1885 and the first waymaster was John Bursey. It became a post office on May 30, 1891, and the first postmaster was James Rowsell. It had no population after 1940. They moved to Gander Bay South.

== Geography ==
Gander Bay South is in Newfoundland within Subdivision L of Division No. 8.

== Demographics ==
As a designated place in the 2016 Census of Population conducted by Statistics Canada, Gander Bay South recorded a population of 325 living in 124 of its 138 total private dwellings, a change of 4.5% from its 2011 population of 311. With a land area of 5.31 km^{2} (2.05 sq mi), it had a population density of 61.2/km^{2} (158.5/sq mi) in 2016.

== Government ==
Gander Bay South is a local service district (LSD) that is governed by a committee responsible for the provision of certain services to the community. The chair of the LSD committee is Marvin Hodder.

== See also ==
- List of communities in Newfoundland and Labrador
- List of designated places in Newfoundland and Labrador
- List of local service districts in Newfoundland and Labrador
