= Musgrave Harbour =

Town in Canada

Musgrave Harbour Muddy Hole
- Town
- Seal
- Interactive map of Musgrave Harbour
- Coordinates: 49°27′00″N 53°57′30″W
- Country: Canada
- Province: Newfoundland and Labrador
- Settled: 1834

Government

Area
  - Land: 69.94 km^{2} (27.00 sq mi)

Population (2021)
  - Total: 946
  - Density: 14.2/km^{2} (37/sq mi)
- Time zone: UTC-3:30 (Newfoundland Time)
  - Summer (DST): UTC-2:30 (Newfoundland Daylight)
- Area code: 709
- Highways: Route 330
- Website: Town of Musgrave Harbour

Musgrave Harbour is a town in the Canadian province of Newfoundland and Labrador.

== History ==
Musgrave Harbour is a fishing community that was originally named Muddy Hole. The name was changed in 1886 in honour of Governor Anthony Musgrave. It was visited as early as the 18th century by Europeans. For example, George Skeffington from Bonavista was given salmon fishing rights there in 1723. In the 19th century the migratory fishery took place between Musgrave Harbour and Cape Freels and eventually permanent settlement began. The first family to settle in Musgrave Harbour was John Whiteway, of Western Bay, in 1834. The 1836 Census show Whiteway's family of eleven living in "Muddy Hole" and five people living in nearby Ragged Harbour. Musgrave Harbour was the administrative and religious centre of Hamilton Sound by 1900, but due to its poor harbour it failed to be a commercial centre. When Tobias Abbott of Doting Cove introduced the gasoline engine in 1909 the Labrador fishery was replaced with the inshore fishery. The people of Musgrave Harbour also became active in the Fisherman's Protective Union movement and the F.P.U established a local council there in 1909. In 1912 a Union Trading Co. store opened in Doting Cove. By 1911 the population was 433 in Musgrave Harbour, 458 in Doting Cove, and 49 at Ragged Harbour.

=== 1941 airplane crash ===
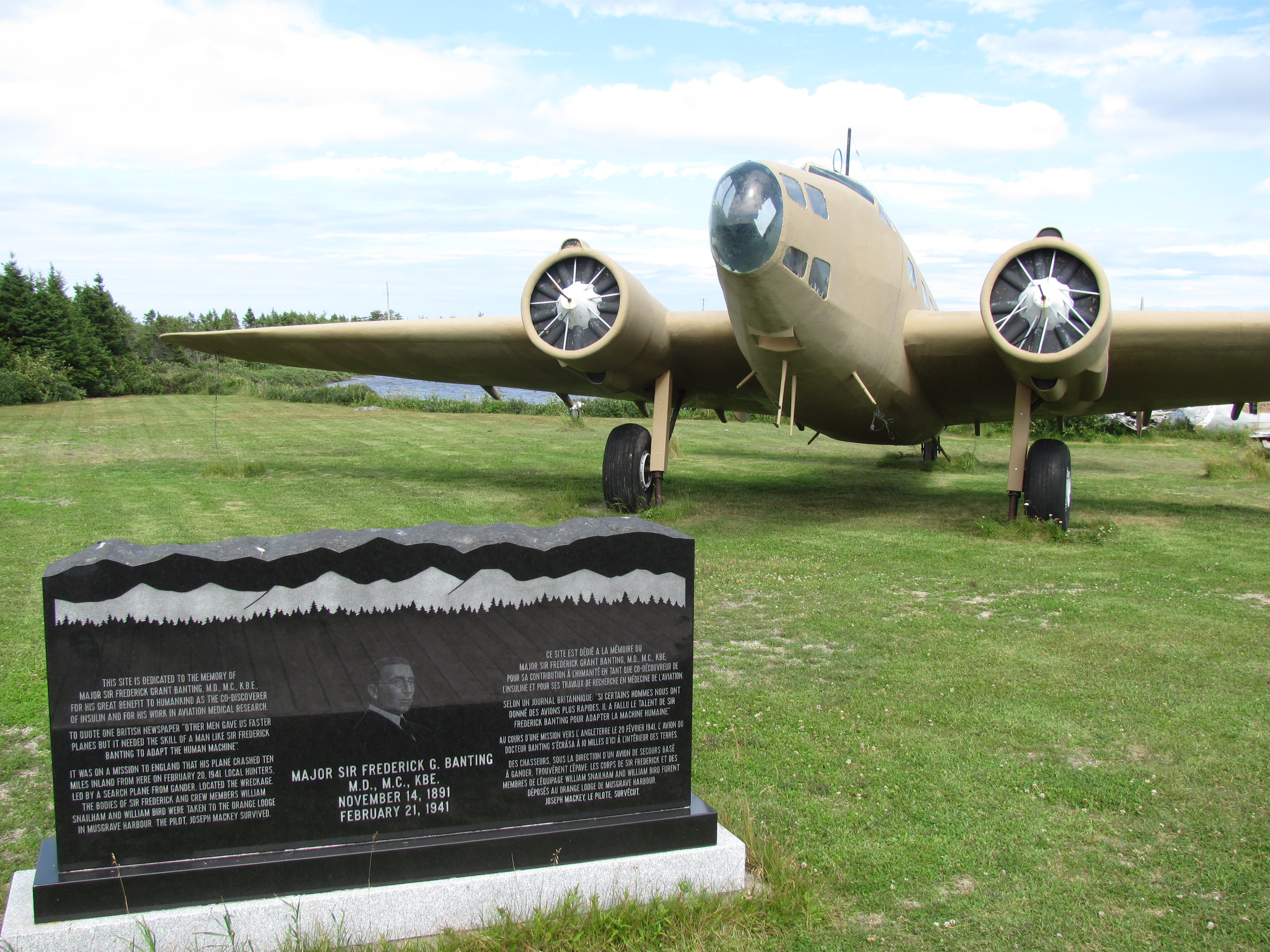
Banting Memorial Park

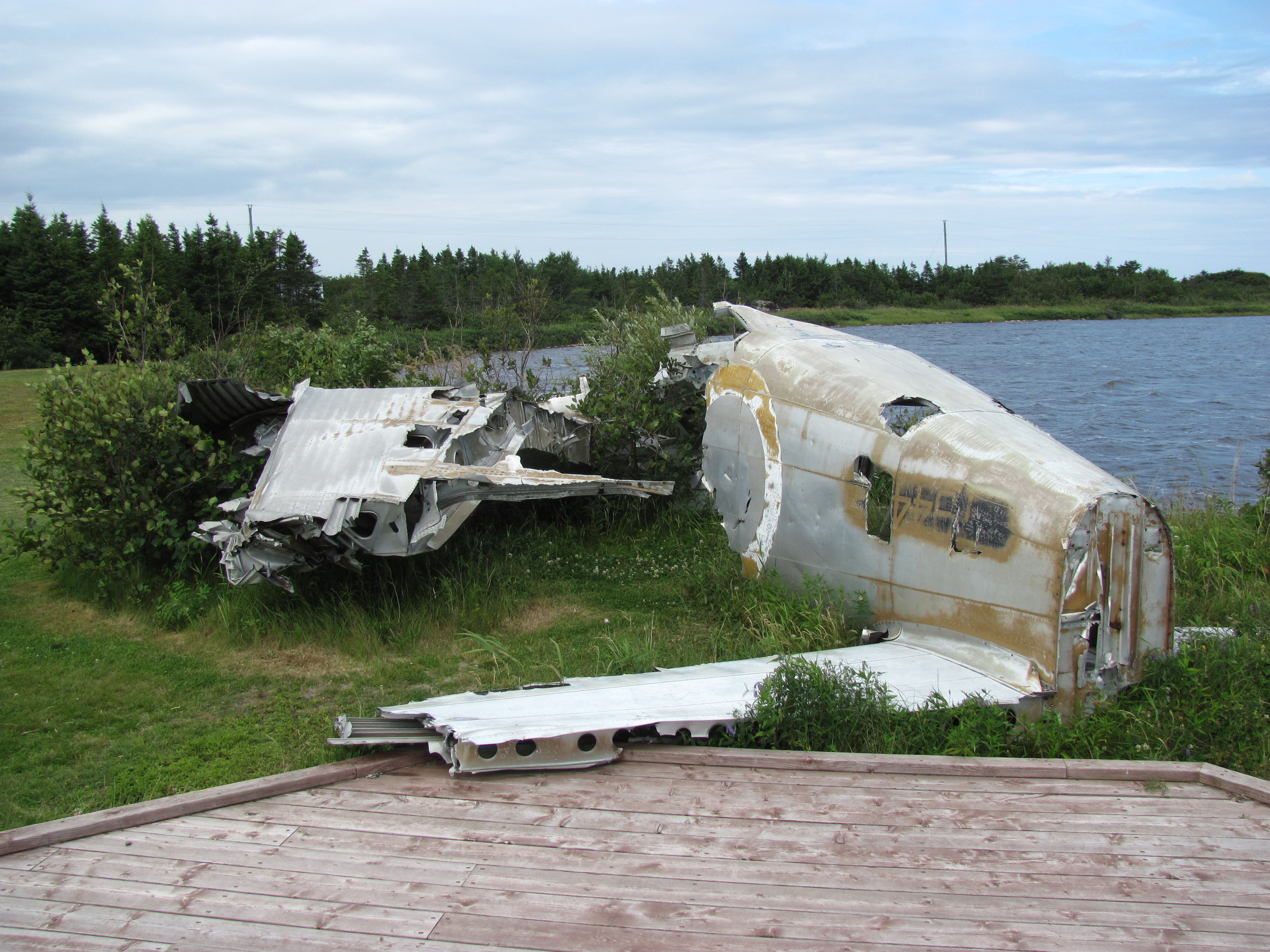
Wreckage

In 1941 Dr. Sir Frederick Banting, co-discoverer of insulin, died the following day after a plane crash near Musgrave Harbour. The Hudson Bomber, with crew Captain Joseph Mackey, co-pilot William Snailham, and navigator William Bird, were en route to England when they had engine trouble just after leaving Gander. They attempted to return to Gander, but didn't make it. Captain Joseph Mackey was the only survivor.

== Geography ==
Musgrave Harbour is in Newfoundland within Division No. 8. It is on the Kittiwake Coast near the Town of Gander.

== Demographics ==
In the 2021 Census of Population conducted by Statistics Canada, Musgrave Harbour had a population of 946 living in 413 of its 486 total private dwellings, a change of −4.4% from its 2016 population of 990. With a land area of 67.3 km^{2} (26.0 sq mi), it had a population density of 14.1/km^{2} (36.4/sq mi) in 2021.

=== Religion ===
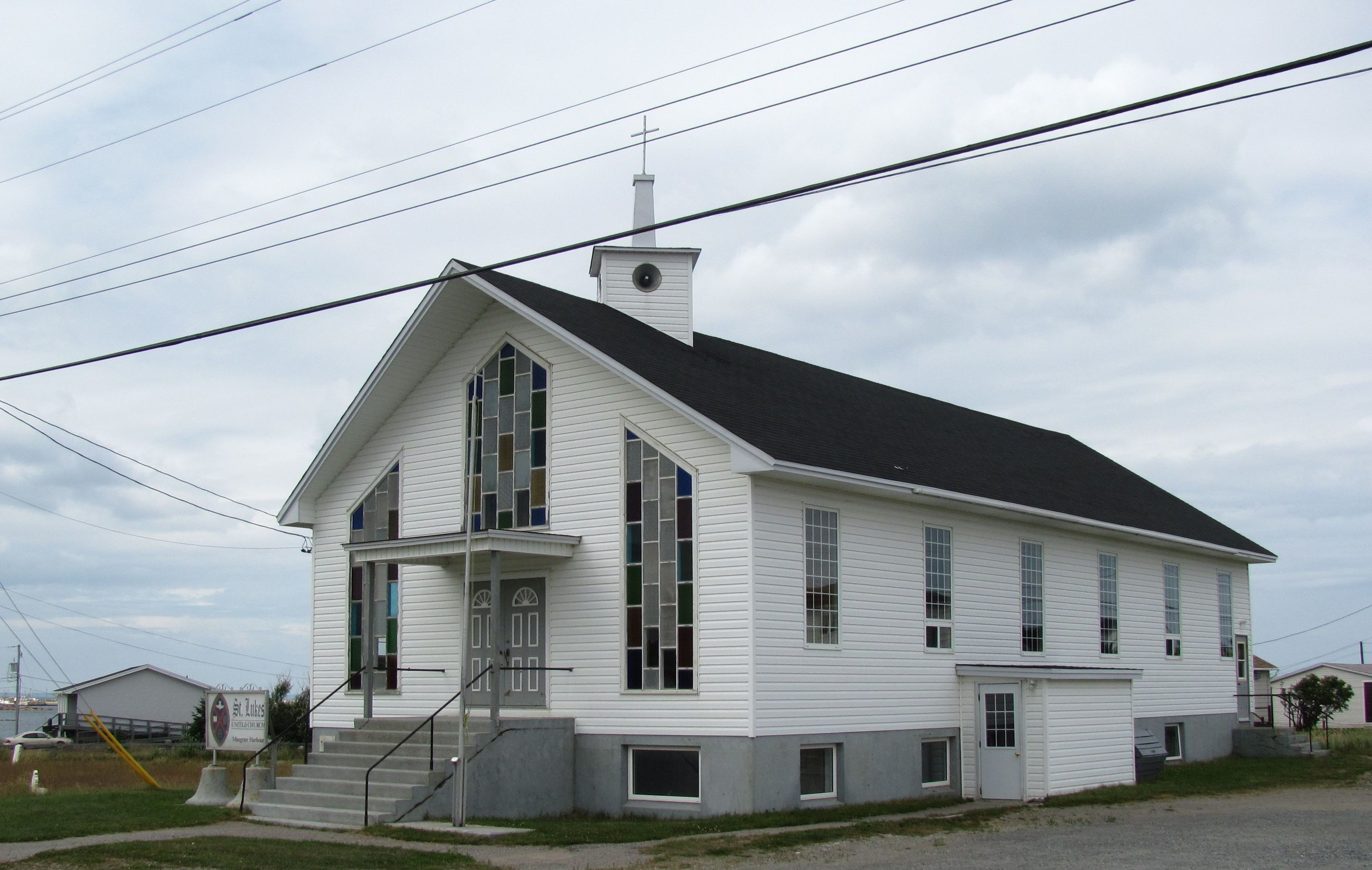
United Church, Musgrave Harbour

The earliest people in Musgrave Harbour were of the Church of England; however, settlers from Bonavista introduced Methodism to Musgrave Harbour. A Wesleyan school opened in 1853, it was closed in 1862 and then reopened in 1865 by John Wheeler. A full-time minister was appointed to Musgrave Harbour in 1874. Doting Cove, Ragged Harbour, and Musgrave Harbour had a combined population of more than 500 by 1884, and almost all were Methodist. The first resident minister in Musgrave Harbour was the Rev. Henry Lewis, and the 1874 church was the first Methodist church in the Greenspond circuit. The Salvation Army came to Musgrave Harbour in the 1890s and by 1930 made up the majority of the population.

== Attractions ==
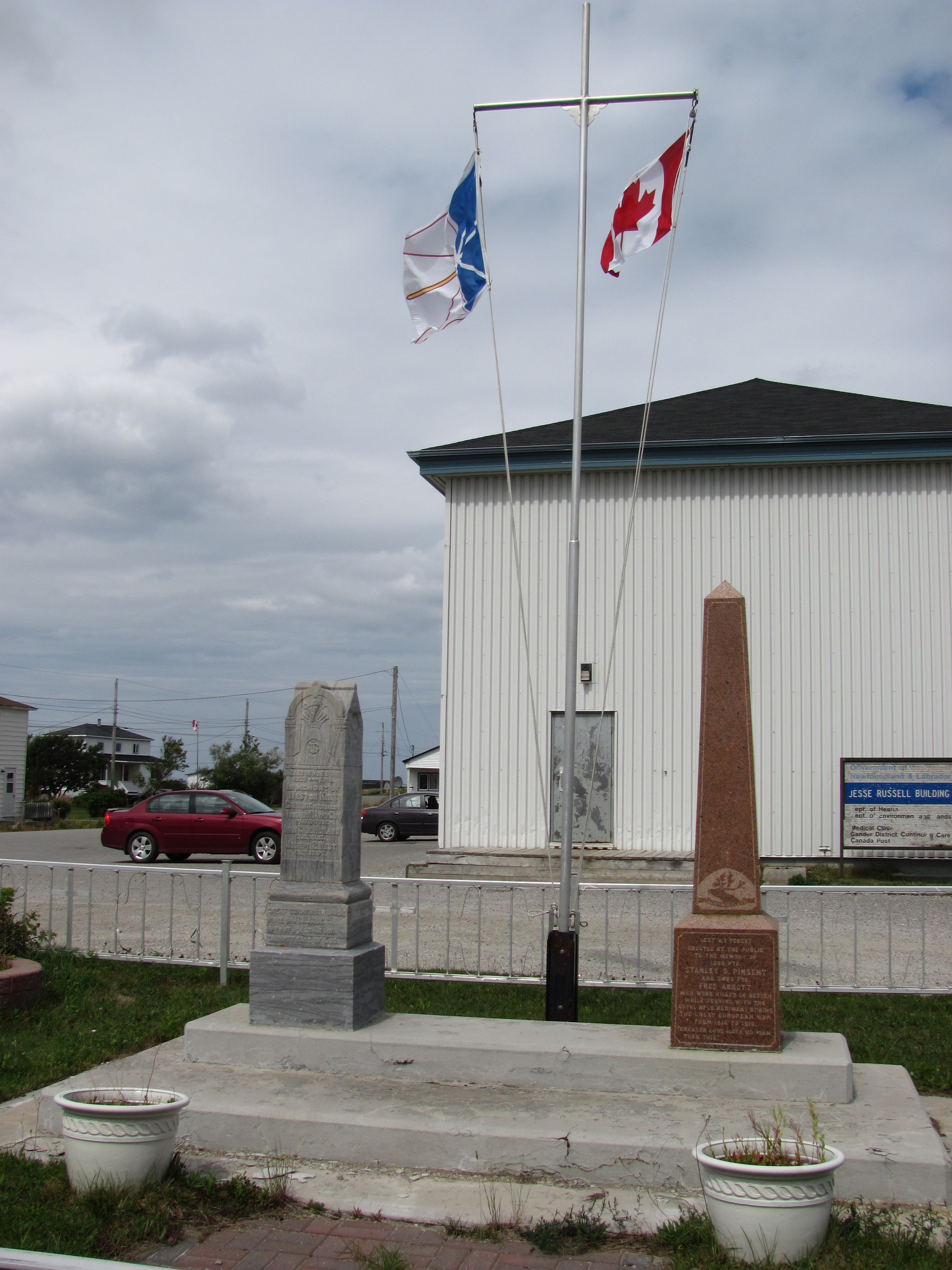
War Memorial

The local park is named after Sir Frederick Banting, and also has an interpretation centre dedicated to Dr. Banting and the crash. The wreckage of the plane was airlifted to the park in 1990.

St. Luke's United Church is a church in the centre of Musgrave Harbour and The War Memorial in front of the post office.

Important early architect William Tuff Whiteway came from Musgrave Harbour.

== Education ==
The first school in Musgrave Harbour was established in 1852 with Charles Harris as the teacher. It was built by the people for the Wesleyan School Society, it opened in 1852 with about 36 children. The school was closed in 1863 but it reopened again in 1865 with John Wheeler as the teacher, and he served for 24 years. The first female teacher was Laura Taylor in 1893.

== See also ==
- List of cities and towns in Newfoundland and Labrador
- List of communities in Newfoundland and Labrador
- List of designated places in Newfoundland and Labrador
