= Newfoundland and Labrador Route 334 =

Highway in Newfoundland and Labrador, Canada

Route 334
- Joe Batt’s Arm Road

Route information
- Maintained by Newfoundland and Labrador Department of Transportation and Infrastructure
- Length: 19.7 km (12.2 mi)

Major junctions
- West end: Route 333 in Fogo Island Central
- East end: Tilting

Location
- Country: Canada
- Province: Newfoundland and Labrador

Highway system
- Highways in Newfoundland and Labrador
← Route 333	→ Route 335

Route 334, also known as Joe Batt's Arm Road, is a 19.7-kilometre-long (12.2 mi) north–south highway on Fogo Island in the Canadian province of Newfoundland and Labrador. It serves as the only roadway access to the eastern half of the island.

== Route description ==
Route 334 begins in Fogo Island Central at an intersection with Route 333 (Fogo Island Road). It heads northeast to wind its along the island’s northern coastline to pass through the communities of Shoal Bay, Barr'd Islands, and Joe Batt's Arm before turning southeast and more inland for several kilometres. The highway then rejoins the coastline shortly before entering Tilting, where it winds its way through town before coming to an end at the town’s main harbour.

== Major intersections ==
Location	km	mi	Destinations	Notes
Fogo Island Central	0.0	0.0	Route 333 (Fogo Island Road) – Fogo, Seldom, MV Veteran ferry	Western terminus; provides access to Fogo Aerodrome
Tilting	19.7	12.2	Dead End at Tilting's harbour	Eastern terminus
1.000 mi = 1.609 km; 1.000 km = 0.621 mi
