= Newfoundland and Labrador Route 333 =

Highway in Newfoundland and Labrador, Canada

Route 333
- Fogo Island Road

Route information
- Maintained by Newfoundland and Labrador Department of Transportation and Infrastructure
- Length: 24.4 km (15.2 mi)

Major junctions
- South end: MV Veteran ferry in Stag Harbour
- Island Harbour Road near Fogo Aerodrome; Route 334 in Fogo Island Central
- North end: Main Street in Fogo

Location
- Country: Canada
- Province: Newfoundland and Labrador

Highway system
- Highways in Newfoundland and Labrador
← Route 332	→ Route 334

Route 333, also known as Fogo Island Road, is a 24.4-kilometre-long (15.2 mi) north–south highway on Fogo Island in the Canadian province of Newfoundland and Labrador. It is the primary highway on the island, connecting all of the island's communities with the MV Veteran ferry, which in turn connects them to mainland Newfoundland and the rest of Canada. The highway is one of only two 3-digit highways in the province that use the same number, the other being Route 222.

== Route description ==
Route 333 begins in Stag Harbour at the island's ferry terminal on the western edge of town. It heads east to pass through town before leaving and winding its way along the southern coast for several kilometres. The highway now passes through Seldom-Little Seldom, where it turns due north, and heads inland for several kilometres to pass by the Fogo Aerodrome, where it has an intersection with Island Harbour Road, which provides access to Island Harbour and Deep Bay. Route 333 heads north to pass through Fogo Island Central, where it has an intersection with Route 334 (Joe Batt's Arm Road). The highway now heads northwest through rural areas for several kilometres to the island's northern coast to enter Fogo, where it comes to an end at an intersection with Main Street just east of downtown.

== Major intersections ==
Location	km	mi	Destinations	Notes
Stag Harbour	0.0	0.0	MV Veteran ferry - Change Islands, Mainland Newfoundland	Southern terminus
	16.2	10.1	Island Harbour Road (Route 333-21) - Fogo Aerodrome, Island Harbour, Deep Bay	
Fogo Island Central	17.5	10.9	Route 334 east (Joe Batt's Arm Road) – Joe Batt's Arm, Tilting	Western terminus of Route 334
Fogo	24.4	15.2	Main Street	Northern terminus
1.000 mi = 1.609 km; 1.000 km = 0.621 mi
