= Harold Earle =

Newfoundland merchant and politician (1884–1954)

Harold Earle MHA

Member of the Newfoundland House of Assembly for Fogo
- In office June 11, 1932 – February 16, 1934
- Preceded by: Richard Hibbs
- Succeeded by: Gordon Janes (post-Confederation)

Personal details
- Born: March 4, 1884 Fogo, Newfoundland Colony
- Died: March 10, 1954 (aged 70) Fogo, Newfoundland, Canada
- Party: United Newfoundland
- Education: Bishop Feild College
- Occupation: Merchant

Harold J. Earle (March 4, 1884 – March 10, 1954) was a merchant and politician in Newfoundland. He represented Fogo in the Newfoundland House of Assembly from 1932 to 1934 as a United Newfoundland Party member.

The son of Henry J. Earle, he was born in Fogo and was educated at Bishop Feild College and in England. In 1917, he took over the management of the family company Earle Sons and Co. The company was involved in the export of seafood and retail sales of groceries and fishing equipment; it operated in Fogo, Twillingate, Herring Neck and Change Islands. Earle was elected to the Newfoundland assembly in 1932.

He died in Fogo at the age of 70. The Earle business continued to operate until 1974 when it closed due to declining fish stocks.
