= Zita Cobb =

Canadian businesswoman and social entrepreneur

Zita Cobb, CM, is a Canadian businesswoman and social entrepreneur who grew up on Fogo Island, a small outport fishing community off the North East coast of Newfoundland, Canada, in the North Atlantic Ocean.

Cobb is the co-founder and CEO of the registered Canadian charity, Shorefast, which she launched with her brothers Anthony and Alan Cobb, on Fogo Island in 2004. She is also the original innkeeper of the luxury Fogo Island Inn.

In December 2025, Ms. Cobb launched the Shorefast Institute for Place-Based Economies to advance PLACE as a legitimate pillar of economic development, alongside government and markets. Cobb was invited to address the Senate of Canada in May 2025, during a session of the Committee on Banking, Commerce and the Economy, to report on access to credit and capital for small and medium enterprises.

Cobb has been recognized for her contributions to the Canadian economy and business world.

== Early life and education ==
Cobb is an eighth-generation Fogo Islander. Cobb has six brothers, and her father was a 7th generation inshore fisherman. She grew up in a household with no electricity or running water. She survived tuberculosis at the age of six during a year spent at a sanatorium. Cobb studied business and graduated from Carleton University in Ottawa.

== Career ==
Cobb started working with various oil companies in Alberta, and traveling in Canada and Africa. She worked at Ottawa-based JDS Fitel for ten years and became the CFO. The company merged with the U.S. company Uniphase in 1999 to become JDS Uniphase. In 2001, she exercised stock options worth US$69 million, and left the company to sail around the world for 4 years.

== Fogo Island Inn ==
In 2006, Cobb and her brother Anthony founded Shorefast, a Canadian social enterprise, including an investment of $10 million from the Cobbs. The Canadian government contributed $5 million, and the provincial government contributed another $5 million. Shorefast built the Fogo Island Inn, which opened in 2013 and continues to be operated by Shorefast Social Enterprises Inc.

== Honours and awards ==
On June 30, 2016, Cobb was made a Member of the Order of Canada by Governor General David Johnston for "her contributions as a social entrepreneur who has helped revive the unique rural communities of Fogo Island and Change Islands through innovative social engagement and geotourism."

She has been recognized with honorary doctorate degrees from Carleton University, Memorial University of Newfoundland, McGill University and University of Ottawa.

Cobb was inducted into the Junior Achievement Business Hall of Fame in May 2018.

On November 12, 2019, Cobb interviewed 44th President of the United States Barack Obama for a public event at the Mile One Centre in St. John's, Newfoundland and Labrador, which was hosted by the St. John's Board of Trade.
