= Alder Island =

Alder Island may refer to:

Canada

- Alder Island (New Brunswick), an island in Charlotte County, New Brunswick, Canada
- Alder Island (Haida Gwaii), an island in the Haida Gwaii archipelago of the North Coast of British Columbia, Canada, Nprth of Burnaby Island, off the southeast end of Moresby Island. Also called Ḵ'uuna Gwaayaay
- Alder Island (Carp Lake), an island in the area of Carp Lake Provincial Park and Protected Area, southwest of McLeod Lake
- Alder Island (British Columbia), an island in the Carey Group islands in the Queen Charlotte Strait-Johnstone Strait region of the Central Coast of British Columbia
- Alder Island Stillwater is a river feature in Halifax County, Nova Scotia

United States

- Alder Island (New York), an island in Nassau County, New York

== See also ==
- Fogo, Newfoundland and Labrador
