= Deep Bay =

Deep Bay may refer to:

- Deep Bay, British Columbia, Canada
- Deep Bay, China
- Deep Bay, Newfoundland and Labrador, Canada

== See also ==
- Deep Bay crater
- Deep Bay Water Aerodrome
- Deep Water Bay, a bay and residential area on the southern shore of Hong Kong Island
