= Barr'd Islands =

Community in Newfoundland and Labrador

Coordinates: 49.723°N 54.188°W

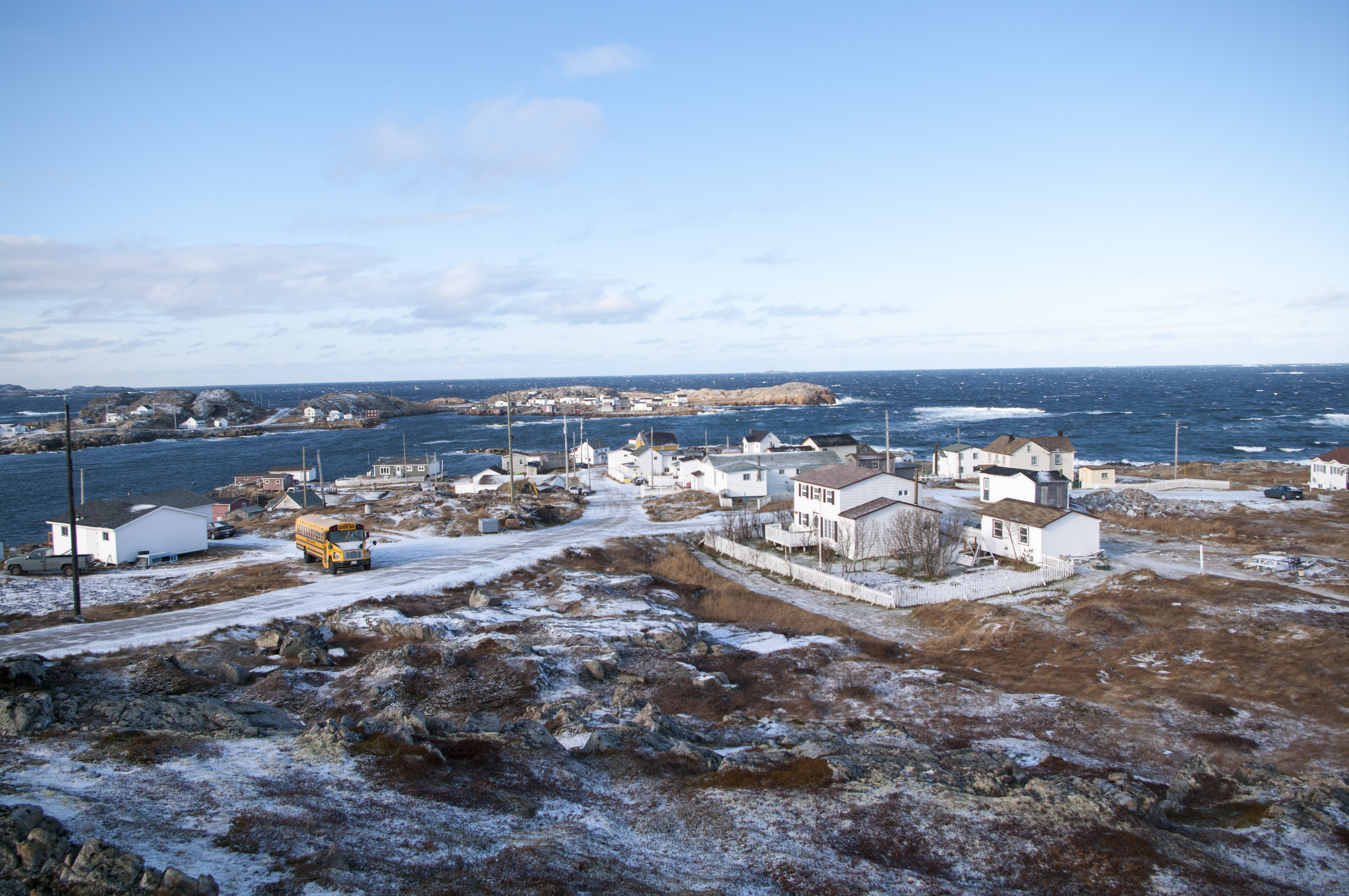
View of Barr'd Islands looking west toward the harbour breakwater

Barr'd Islands is a community on Fogo Island in the province of Newfoundland and Labrador, Canada. It is part of the town of Fogo Island, with which it amalgamated on March 1, 2011. Barr'd Islands was settled permanently in the early 19th century by English fishermen. The 1836 census showed a total of 14 households had taken up residence there at that time.
