= Shoal Bay, Fogo Island =

Coordinates: 49.689°N 54.190°W

Shoal Bay is a community on Fogo Island in the province of Newfoundland and Labrador. It is part of the municipality of Town of Fogo Island, with which it amalgamated on March 1, 2011.
