= Joe Batt's Arm =

Community in Canada

- Community
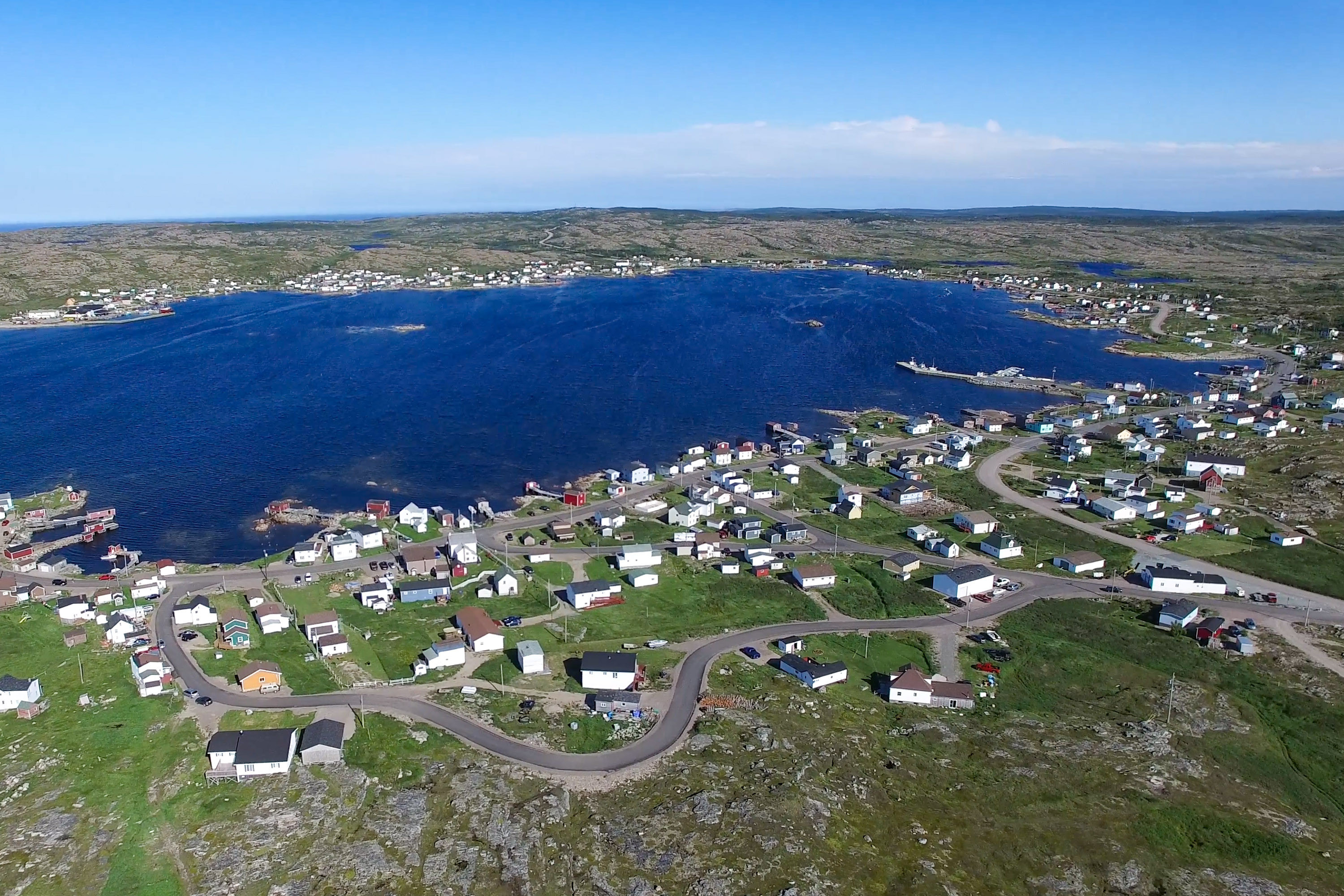
- Interactive map of Joe Batt's Arm
- Coordinates: 49°43′21″N 54°08′57″W
- Country: Canada
- Province: Newfoundland and Labrador

Population (2006)
  - Total: 778
- Time zone: UTC-3:30 (Newfoundland Time)
  - Summer (DST): UTC-2:30 (Newfoundland Daylight)
- Area code: 709
- Highways: Route 334

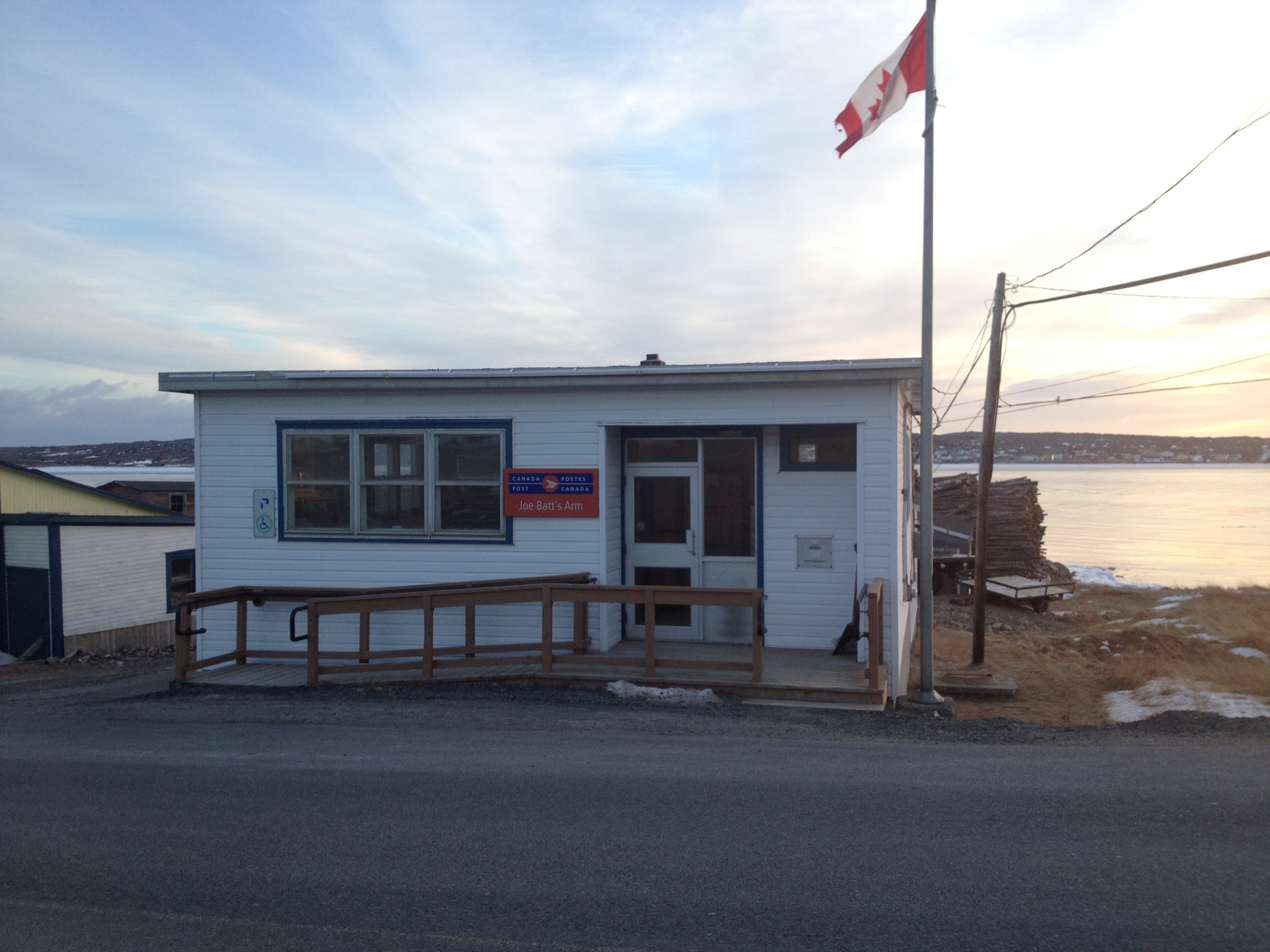
Post office in Joe Batt's Arm, Fogo Island, NL, Canada

Joe Batt's Arm is a community in the Canadian province of Newfoundland and Labrador, located on Fogo Island. It was previously incorporated as a town named Joe Batt's Arm-Barr'd Islands-Shoal Bay prior to becoming part of the Town of Fogo Island through an amalgamation in 2011. The former town had a population of 778 in the Canada 2006 Census. This makes it the largest community on the island.

== See also ==
- List of cities and towns in Newfoundland and Labrador

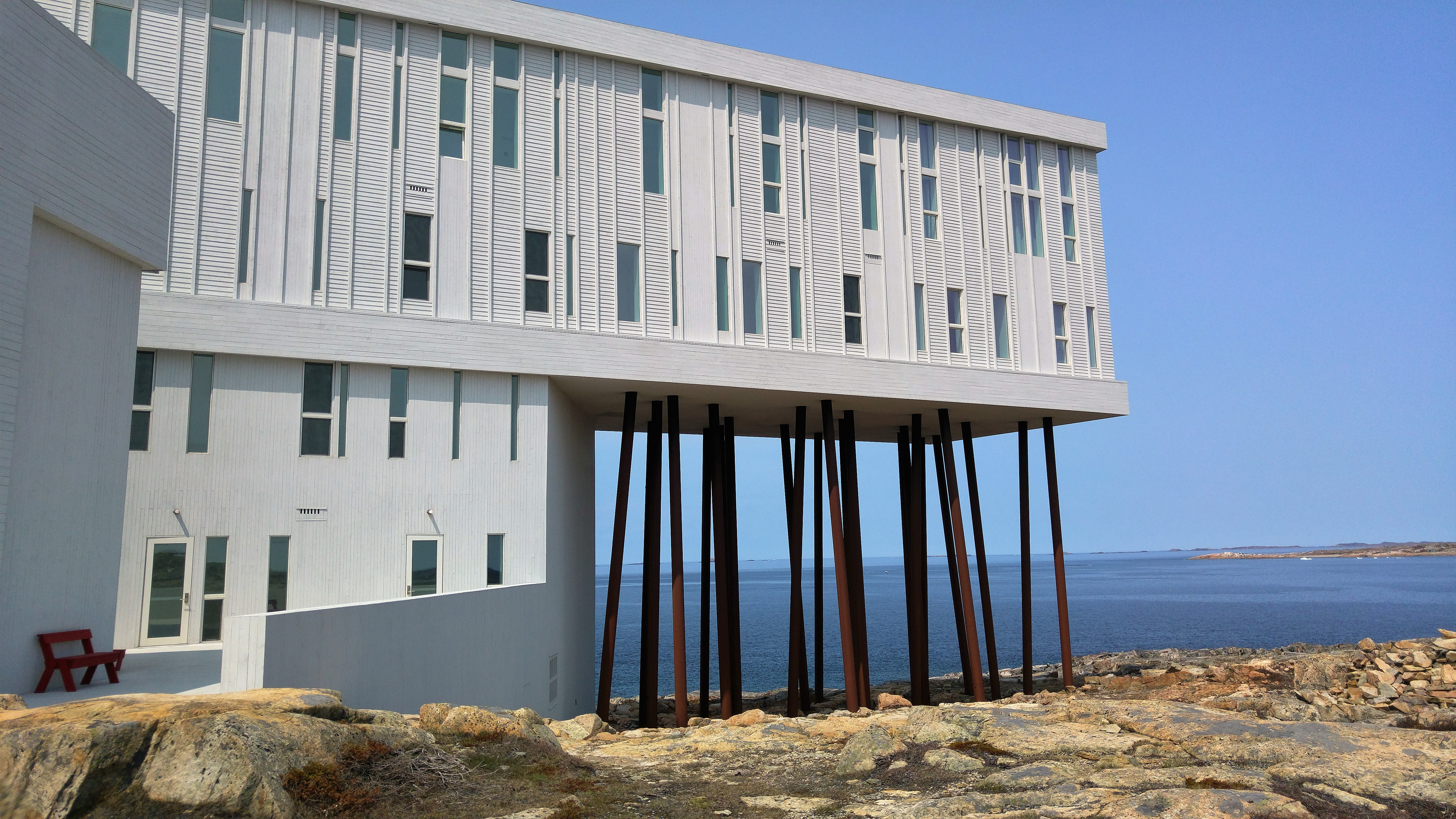
Fogo Island Inn
