= Shorefast =

Fogo Island, Newfoundland, economic development charity

Shorefast is a Canadian social enterprise founded to build economic and cultural resilience on Fogo Island, Newfoundland. After years of economic development work on Fogo Island, Shorefast collaborates with other communities to share insights and best practices for local communities to thrive in the global economy.

The enterprise includes a variety of charitable programs (run by Shorefast Foundation, a registered Canadian charity) and social businesses (run by Shorefast Social Enterprises Inc.).

Shorefast's largest business is the luxury resort Fogo Island Inn.

Shorefast founded Fogo Island Workshops to bring contemporary offerings for traditions of quilting and woodworking. Further businesses include Fogo Island Fish featuring hand-line cod, Growlers Ice Cream, and The Storehouse restaurant.

== History ==
Shorefast was formed in 2006 by siblings Zita, Alan, and Anthony Cobb following the collapse of the Atlantic northwest cod fishery. Zita, who grew up on Fogo Island, left the island in 1975 to study business at Carleton University, and went on to become CFO of JDS Fitel, and then senior vice-president of strategy for fiber optics manufacturer JDS Uniphase. Following her career, she returned home to Fogo Island to start working with her brothers.

Shorefast is recognized as a social enterprise, on the basis that it uses business-minded means to achieve social ends.

== Charitable Programs ==
=== The Shorefast Institute for Place-Based Economies ===
During COVID-19, Shorefast ran a Community Economies Pilot project to determine how other Canadian communities could strengthen local economies in service of place. Partner communities included Fogo Island, Hamilton, London, Prince Edward County, and the South Island area of Victoria. Shorefast partnered with the Canadian Urban Institute, Community Foundations of Canada, and the Coady Institute in the initiative. The Pilot confirmed four key challenges that are impeding place-based economic development: (1) access to financial capital, (2) lack of community-specific data, (3) the need to shift mindsets, and (4) missing architecture for collaboration between economic sectors. Building from Pilot learnings and active practice on Fogo Island, Shorefast established The Shorefast Institute for Place-Based Economies, housing resources and opportunities for businesses, government bodies, and community members to learn, share, and connect on how to operate with a place-centric focus in economic development.

=== Fogo Island Arts ===
Fogo Island Arts is a founding initiative of Shorefast built upon the legacy of the National Film Board of Canada's Fogo Process. The residency-based contemporary art venue hosts artists, designers, writers, filmmakers, musicians, curators, and thinkers from around the world. While on the Island, artists work in one of four artist studios designed by Newfoundland-born, Norway-based architect Todd Saunders. Artists-in-residence regularly participate in community engagements, often in the form of public talks, and selected artists also present solo exhibitions at the Fogo Island Gallery, located in the Fogo Island Inn.

=== Environmental Stewardship ===
Shorefast engages in a series of initiatives to support coastal and oceanic ecosystems. Projects are focused on habitat stewardship and conservation, sustainable harvesting, and sustainability planning. Shorefast works with researchers, academics, practitioners, universities, organizations, communities and other stakeholders to build ocean health. Example projects include the Seaweed Pilot Project, where Shorefast and the Fogo Island Co-operative Society partnered with the Marine Institute at Memorial University of Newfoundland and the Canadian Centre for Fisheries Innovation to lead research towards the development of Newfoundland and Labrador’s first commercial seaweed cultivation operation.

=== Residencies ===
Shorefast invites experts in various fields to share their knowledge with the community and to lead programming. An example is Geology at the Edge, which is Canada's first community-based geologist-in-residence program. This program "aims to combine the understanding or geological heritage with sustainable economic development focused upon geotourism, tourism that creates conditions for the socioeconomic well-being of communities while maintaining their cultural and ecological integrity"

=== Boatbuilding ===
Small wooden boats known as punts have been an essential part of the social and economic fabric of rural Newfoundland. Shorefast opened the Punt Premises in June 2019 in the community of Joe Batt’s Arm, Fogo Island. The Premises was fully funded by the Government and a private donor. It includes a set of restored heritage buildings that serves as an interactive cultural interpretation center that encourages interaction with the historical and cultural assets of the inshore fishery. The site serves as a community gathering space, boatbuilding education centre and offers punts for people to row in the harbour.

=== Microlending ===
Known as the Shorefast Business Assistance Fund, Shorefast provides micro-loans on friendly terms to those seeking to start a business on Fogo Island. The fund has granted loans to a diverse set of successful businesses on the Island and continues to accept applications

=== Heritage Preservation ===
Many early structures built in Newfoundland were constructed of wood rather than stone, and close to the shore to allow easy access to fishing grounds. This vernacular architecture still exists on Fogo Island. Shorefast invests in “restoring a number of heritage homes, churches, and public buildings in order to preserve Fogo Island’s distinct built heritage and give these structures continued relevance through continued use".

=== Geotourism ===
Geotourism sustains or enhances the distinctive geographical character of a place including its environment, heritage, aesthetics, culture, and the well-being of its residents. The Fogo Island Inn stands as Shorefast’s major geotourism project, committed to the best interests of Fogo Island’s natural environment, cultural legacy, and communities.

== For-Profit Businesses ==
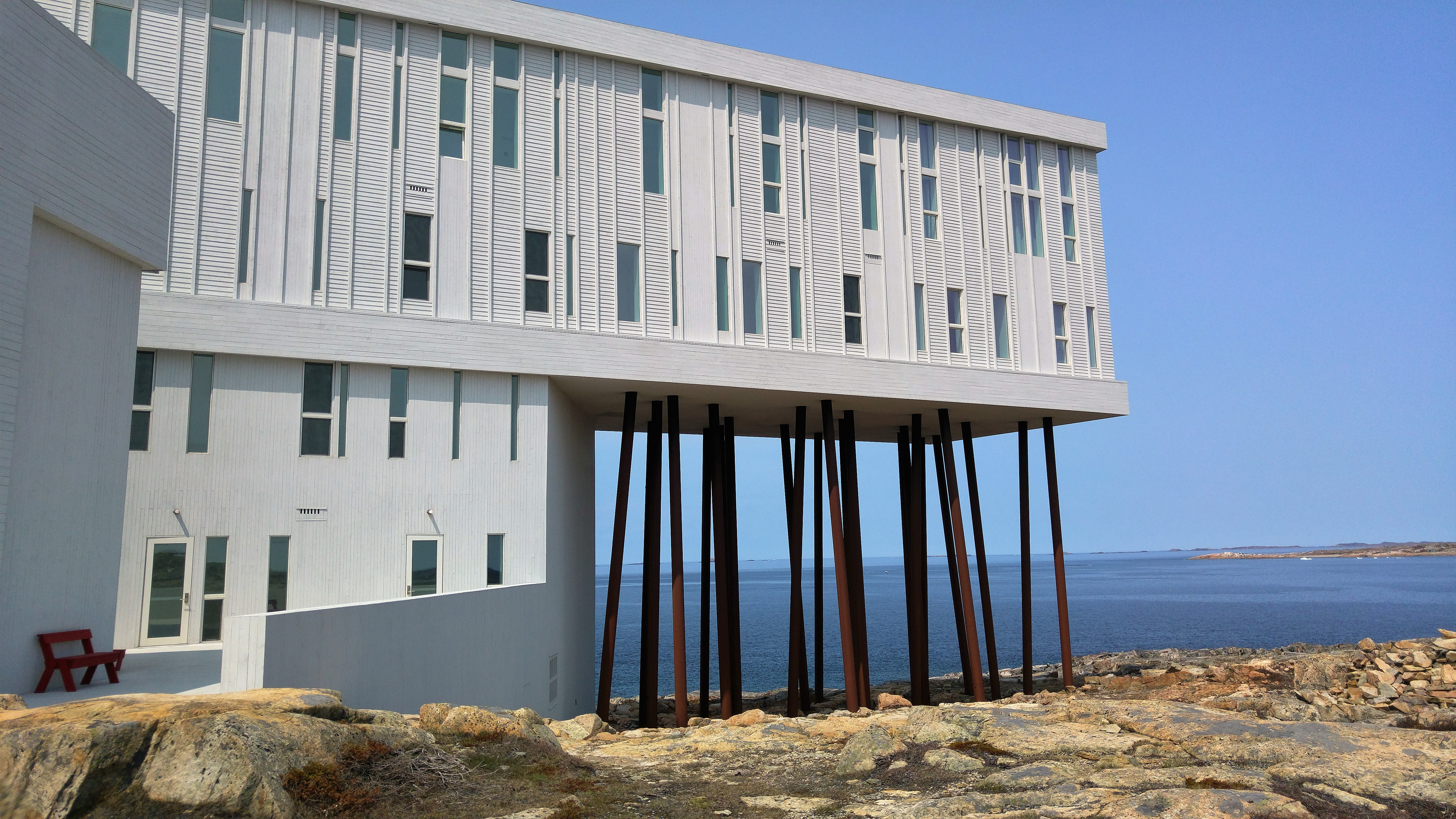
Fogo Island Inn

=== Fogo Island Inn ===
Utilizing the principles of asset-based community development, Shorefast opened the Fogo Island Inn in 2013 as a way to express traditional knowledge and hospitality in new ways and to serve as an economic engine for Fogo Island. Designed by Newfoundland-born, Norway-based architect Todd Saunders, the Inn features 29 one-of-a-kind rooms and draws from the vernacular architecture found on the island. The furniture and textiles that decorate the Inn are handcrafted and primarily produced on Fogo Island – a result of the unique collaboration between international designers and the skilled artisans and craftspeople of Fogo Island.

The Inn was built with philanthropic funds, and all surplus profits are returned to Shorefast for reinvestment into the community. As such, there are no investors seeking a return, and no private gain. This model means that the community of Fogo Island is the beneficial owner of the Inn.

=== Fogo Island Workshops ===
By virtue of their geographic isolation, Fogo Islanders have become masters of making things by hand. Since they arrived as settlers in the late 1600s, Fogo Islanders have been building wooden boats, houses, tools and furniture and creating textiles in the form of knitting, quilting, rug hooking and more. Housed in the renovated Society of United Fishermen’s Hall in the community of Barr’d Islands on Fogo Island, The Woodshop on Fogo Island is the result of an innovative collaborative process between international designers and the artisans and craftspeople of Fogo Island. Furniture and textile pieces were created by this partnership for the Fogo Island Inn, but due to the popularity of the pieces among guests a brick and mortar shop was opened. The Woodshop employs staff year round, including woodworkers who cut, nail, glue, sand, finish and paint every item by hand. As a Shorefast social business, all items are priced to create a surplus, which is then reinvested back into the community.

=== Fogo Island Fish ===
Sustained on primarily cod fishing for generations, fishing is tied to family life, culture and economy in Newfoundland and Labrador. During the mid-twentieth century, with the introduction of international factory-scale over-fishing, cod populations fell drastically forcing the province to announce a cod moratorium in 1992, resulting in an estimated 30,000 job losses and a way of life. In recent years the inshore cod stocks have been rising, allowing people to once again begin to catch small quotas of fish.

Fogo Island Fish employs Fogo Islanders to catch cod using the traditional hand-line caught method, one at a time, resulting in zero by-catch. All caught within a five mile radius of the coast of Fogo Island, this close proximity allows fish to be processed within hours of being caught resulting in a superior product that has been lauded by the restaurant industry. Primarily supplying high-end restaurants in Ontario, Fogo Island Fish is able to pay their fishers well above market rates and surpluses are reinvested back into the community.

Fogo Island Fish was the subject of the National Film Board short-documentary HAND.LINE.COD. directed by Justin Simms, that premiered at the Toronto International Film Festival in September 2016.

=== Growlers Ice Cream ===
Growlers Ice Cream operates seasonally on Fogo Island and offers a wide array of flavours highlighting local cuisine and in-season berries. The ice cream shop is named after the chunks of ice that break off from icebergs or glaciers known as growlers.

=== The Storehouse ===
As part of Shorefast’s Foodways initiatives, the organization opened The Storehouse restaurant in 2023. The restaurant offers simple, healthy dining options that celebrate local foods through contemporary interpretation. The restaurant also operates as a place for community members to gather for fun and social learning opportunities including cooking classes, recipe sharing, gardening tips, and nutrition workshops.

== Economic Nutrition ==
In 2017, Shorefast launched its Economic Nutrition initiative, a financial transparency tool to help individuals make more informed purchasing decisions. The tool shows “where the money goes” when consumers make purchases at Shorefast's social businesses. As a play on the classic nutrition fact labels legally required on food products in most countries, the Economic Nutrition Certification Mark shows how much of the purchase price of any particular item goes towards production processes including labour, materials, or operations, as well as the money’s geographical destination. The labels "are intended to bring transparency to where the money from your purchase goes – how it will be invested in the local community and how it impacts the broader economy."

Economic Nutrition is public for Shorefast social businesses, including the cost of a stay at Fogo Island Inn.

Economic Nutrition is a Certification Mark used under license from Shorefast. The certification process is currently being piloted for wide-spread use for organizations across Canada.
