= Deep Bay, Newfoundland and Labrador =

Village

Coordinates: 49°40′16″N 54°17′35″W

Deep Bay is a designated place on Fogo Island in the Canadian province of Newfoundland and Labrador. Road access is from Route 333 (Fogo Island Road) via Island Harbour Road.

== Geography ==
Deep Bay is in Newfoundland within the Town of Fogo Island in Division No. 8.

== Demographics ==
As a designated place in the 2016 Census of Population conducted by Statistics Canada, Deep Bay recorded a population of 83 living in 42 of its 53 total private dwellings, a change of -2.4% from its 2011 population of 85. With a land area of 6.52 km^{2} (2.52 sq mi), it had a population density of 12.7/km^{2} (33.0/sq mi) in 2016.

== See also ==
- List of communities in Newfoundland and Labrador
- List of designated places in Newfoundland and Labrador
