= Fogo Island Inn =

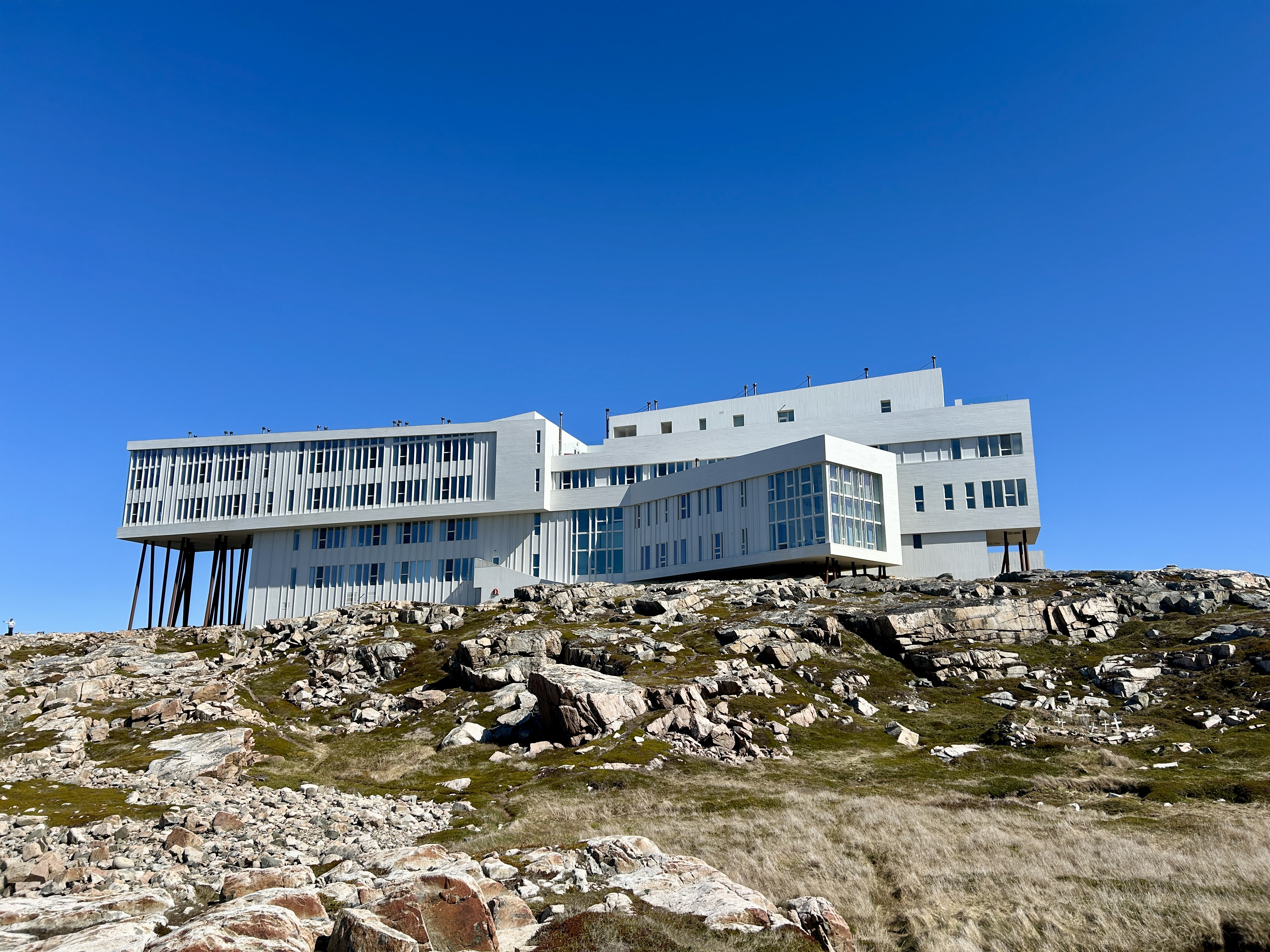
- Interactive map of the Fogo Island Inn area

General information
- Status: Completed 2013
- Location: 210 Main Road; Joe Batt's Arm, NL A0G 2X0; Canada, Fogo Island, Newfoundland
- Coordinates: 49.7304°N 54.17821°W

Technical details
- Floor area: 4500m² (48,437 sq ft)

Design and construction
- Architecture firm: Saunders Architecture
- Awards: Michelin key

Website
- https://fogoislandinn.ca/

The Fogo Island Inn is a hotel located on the northern shore of Fogo Island in Newfoundland, Canada. The inn consists of an outbuilding and main building that totals 4500m² in area. The main building includes 29 guest rooms, a restaurant, Finnish-styled roof-top saunas designed by Rintala Eggertsson Architects, a cinema run in partnership with the National Film Board of Canada, a library featuring books selected by Dr. Leslie Harris, and an art gallery curated by Fogo Island Arts. The main building has four floors, where the first and second floors house most of the public amenities, and 21 guest rooms are located on the third and fourth floors. The outbuilding includes the inn’s storage, laundry, and mechanical facilities. The Fogo Island Inn completed construction in June 2013.

The Fogo Island Inn was designed by Todd Saunders for his client Shorefast, a registered charity of Canada established by Zita Cobb and her brothers Anthony Cobb and Alan Cobb to help build economic and cultural resilience on Fogo Island. Zita Cobb is the former CFO of a fibre-optics company Saunders was born in Gander, Newfoundland while the Cobb siblings were born on Fogo Island. The vision of the inn was to create a space to showcase and preserve the traditional hospitality, art and culture of Fogo Island. With the project being funded by Shorefast, the profits made from the inn are reinvested into the local community, helping to strengthen the once-struggling economy. Before the construction of the inn, four artist studios were constructed as a part of Shorefast’s mission to develop the island as an ecotourism destination to diversify the local economy, which is heavily dependent on cod fishing.

In September 2024, the Michelin Guide awarded Fogo Island Inn Three Michelin Keys, the highest distinction for hotels.

== History ==
The first settlements on Fogo Island were mainly due to the abundant codfish in the area and the population was strongly tied to the cod fishing industry. However, the local economy suffered significantly up until the 1990s due to international factory overfishing in the area and the population of Fogo Island also followed this downward trend. The population drastically decreased until a declaration of a moratorium on cod fishing in 1992 to bring the population of cod back from the brink of extirpation. Many of the buildings on the island have been abandoned due to the population moving elsewhere for work. This history of decline is what prompted Zita Cobb to return to Fogo Island after a successful career in the fibre-optics industry to create Shorefast.

== Design ==
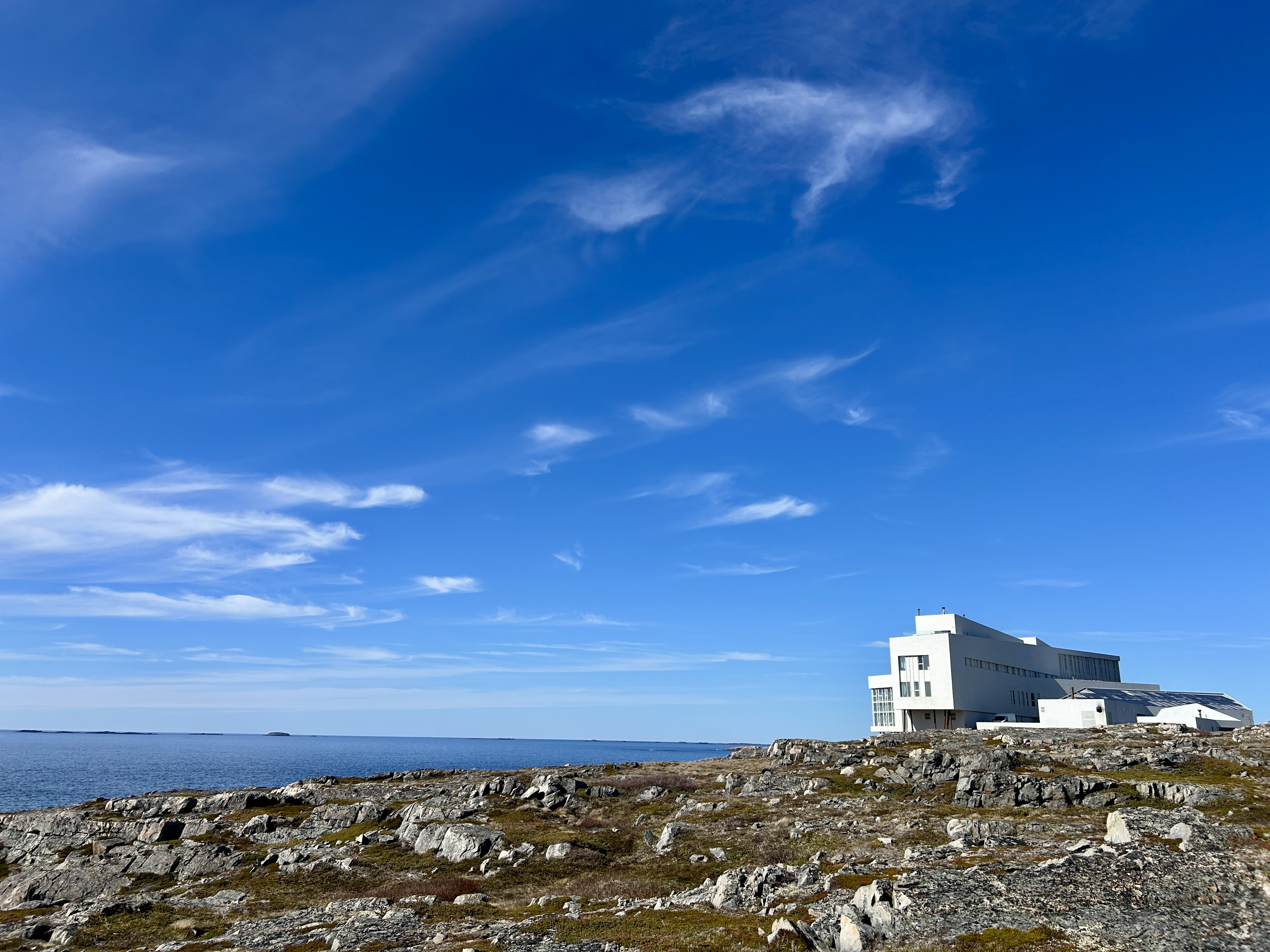
Looking North toward the Labrador Sea and the Inn

The floor plan of the building resembles an “X” shape with one leg of the X running parallel to the shoreline which contains the 29 guest rooms. The other smaller leg of the X contains most of the public amenities such as the restaurant and the art gallery. The placement of each guest room points its view toward Little Fogo Island just north of Fogo Island in the Labrador Sea. The site of the building was chosen to have a minimal impact on the landscape since due to the unique climate on Fogo Island, the native species would take significant time to recover if damaged. The northeast section of the building consists of stilts supported made from corten steel and stands 30 feet in height which pays homage to the tradition where most local buildings are built on stilts. This is an example of the vernacular architecture of the area where building a foundation into the ground was not possible due to the rocky surface. The inn is a steel-framed building but both the interior and exterior black spruce wood finishing are painted white which was intentionally designed to look like a Fogo Island saltbox house.

== Sustainability ==
Located at a remote location, the inn integrates a self-sustaining system as part of the building’s construction. Rainwater is collected from the roof, filtered and stored in cisterns in the basement while 130 solar thermal collectors are used to heat water in the building. The placement of the outbuilding helps to shield the entrance of the main building from strong winds typical on the island.

== Community involvement ==
The construction process relied on local labour and material as much as possible. A roster of designers was brought from Europe to help create most of the interior elements of the building. The designed product was then handcrafted on the Fogo Island ranging from lighting and bed covers to key fobs and wallpapers; all were made to replicate the feeling of being inside a traditional Fogo Island home. Much of the furniture created for the inn is available for purchase due to many requests from guests, which further diversifies the economy of the island.

In 2022, Shorefast, the Canadian charity which owns the Inn, disputed a business tax bill, arguing the Fogo Island Inn was forced to close and didn’t operate during the pandemic due to the Provincial travel ban. A tax agreement between Shorefast and the Town of Fogo Island was reached following mediation by the government of Newfoundland and Labrador.
