= Seldom-Little Seldom =

- Community
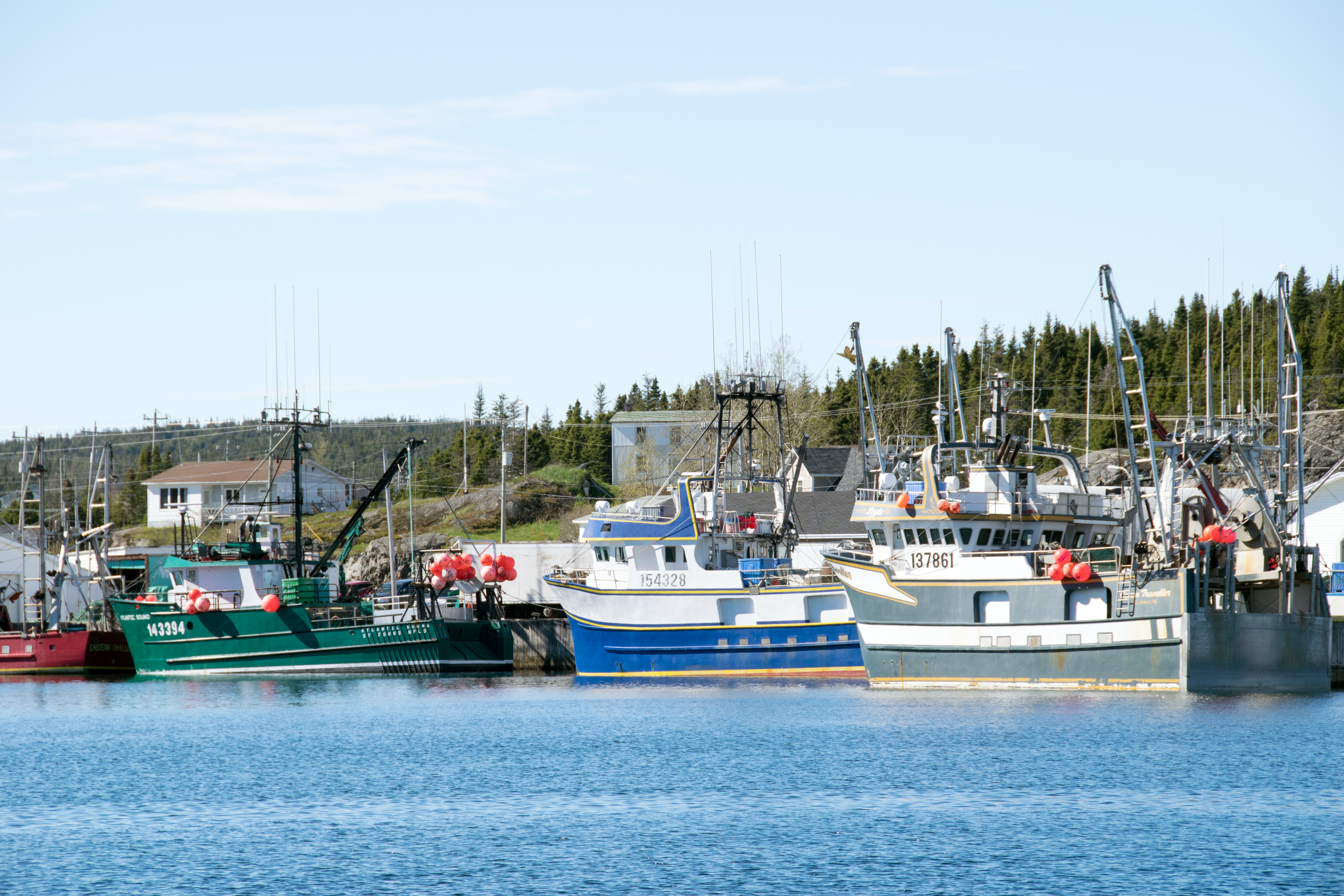
- Interactive map of Seldom-Little Seldom
- Coordinates: 49°37′00″N 54°11′16″W
- Country: Canada
- Province: Newfoundland and Labrador
- Amalgamated: March 1st, 2011

Population (2006)
  - Total: 444
- Time zone: UTC-3:30 (NST)
  - Summer (DST): UTC-2:30 (NDT)
- Postal Code: A0G
- Area code: 709
- Highways: Route 333

Seldom-Little Seldom is an incorporated community formed through the amalgamation of the towns of Seldom and Little Seldom. The community is situated in the southern region of Fogo Island within the Canadian province of Newfoundland and Labrador. Prior to their incorporation, these settlements functioned as separate entities before becoming part of the Town of Fogo Island as a result of the broader amalgamation of the island's other neighborhoods. The population of the former town was recorded at 444 individuals in the 2006 Canadian Census.

On March 1, 2011, the Town of Seldom-Little Seldom, together with other communities, unified to establish the municipality of Fogo Island through a comprehensive amalgamation process. Historically, the town of Seldom along with its lesser counterpart respectively were known as "Seldom-Come-By" and "Little Seldom-Come-By".

== See also ==
- List of cities and towns in Newfoundland and Labrador
