= Fogo, Newfoundland and Labrador =

Fogo
- Community
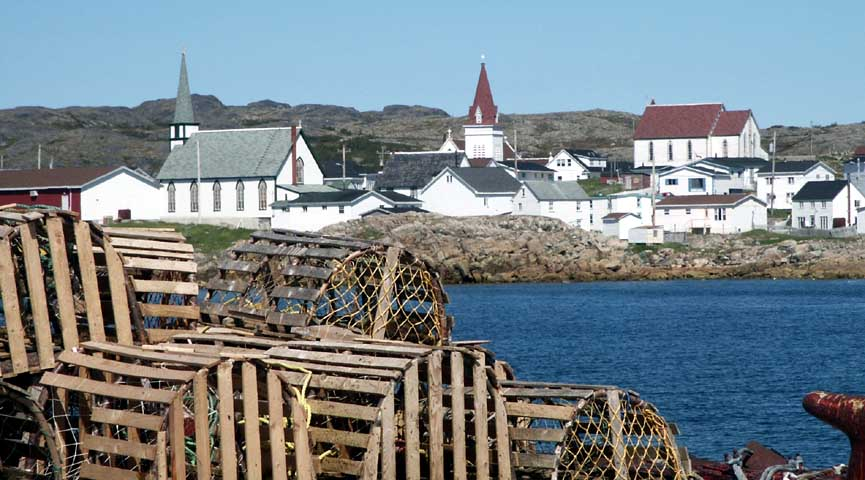
- Downtown Fogo from fishing vessel.

- Location of Fogo in Newfoundland Fogo (Canada)
- Coordinates: 49°42′N 54°17′W
- Country: Canada
- Province: Newfoundland and Labrador
- Settled: early 1700s
- Incorporated (town): 1948
- Amalgamation: March 1, 2011

Government
  - Type: Town Council
  - Mayor: Andrew Shea

Area
  - Total: 5.92 km^{2} (2.29 sq mi)
- Elevation: 43 m (141 ft)

Population (2021)
  - Total: 748
  - Density: 126.4/km^{2} (327/sq mi)
- Time zone: UTC−03:30 (NST)
  - Summer (DST): UTC−02:30 (NDT)
- Postal code span: A0G
- Area code: 709
- Highways: Route 333

Fogo is an outport community on Fogo Island in the Canadian province of Newfoundland and Labrador. It was previously incorporated as a town prior to becoming part of the Town of Fogo Island through an amalgamation in 2011.

== History ==
The second largest community on the island, Fogo may also be the location of the island's first permanent settlement, which took place in the early 18th century, though it is unknown which exact area of Fogo Island hosted the first European settlers. Some historians feel Tilting Harbour might have been the first settlement, owing to its sheltered harbour and close proximity to fishing grounds, although some local legends say that an English settlement was in place at Fogo (town) as early as 1680, this is highly unlikely. James Cook surveyed the area in the 1770s, and at that time he was told that the first English settlers in the area were in Twillingate in the year 1728. Before that, French fishermen frequented the area, but never settled permanently.

Fogo is situated on Fogo Harbour, along the island's north shore. Its economy is tied to the fishing industry and, from the 18th to 20th centuries, was home to several fish merchants.

Fogo
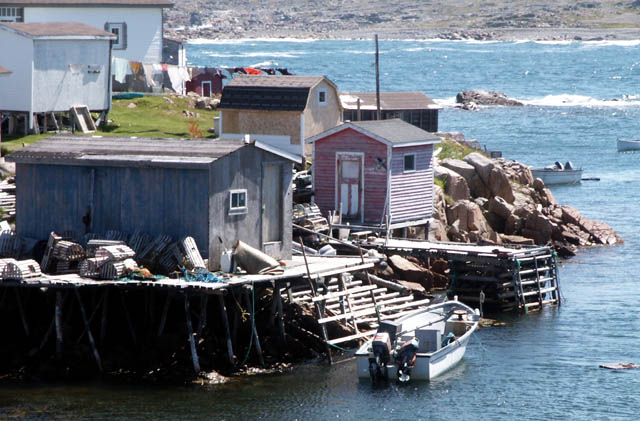
Village of Fogo, Fogo Island, Newfoundland

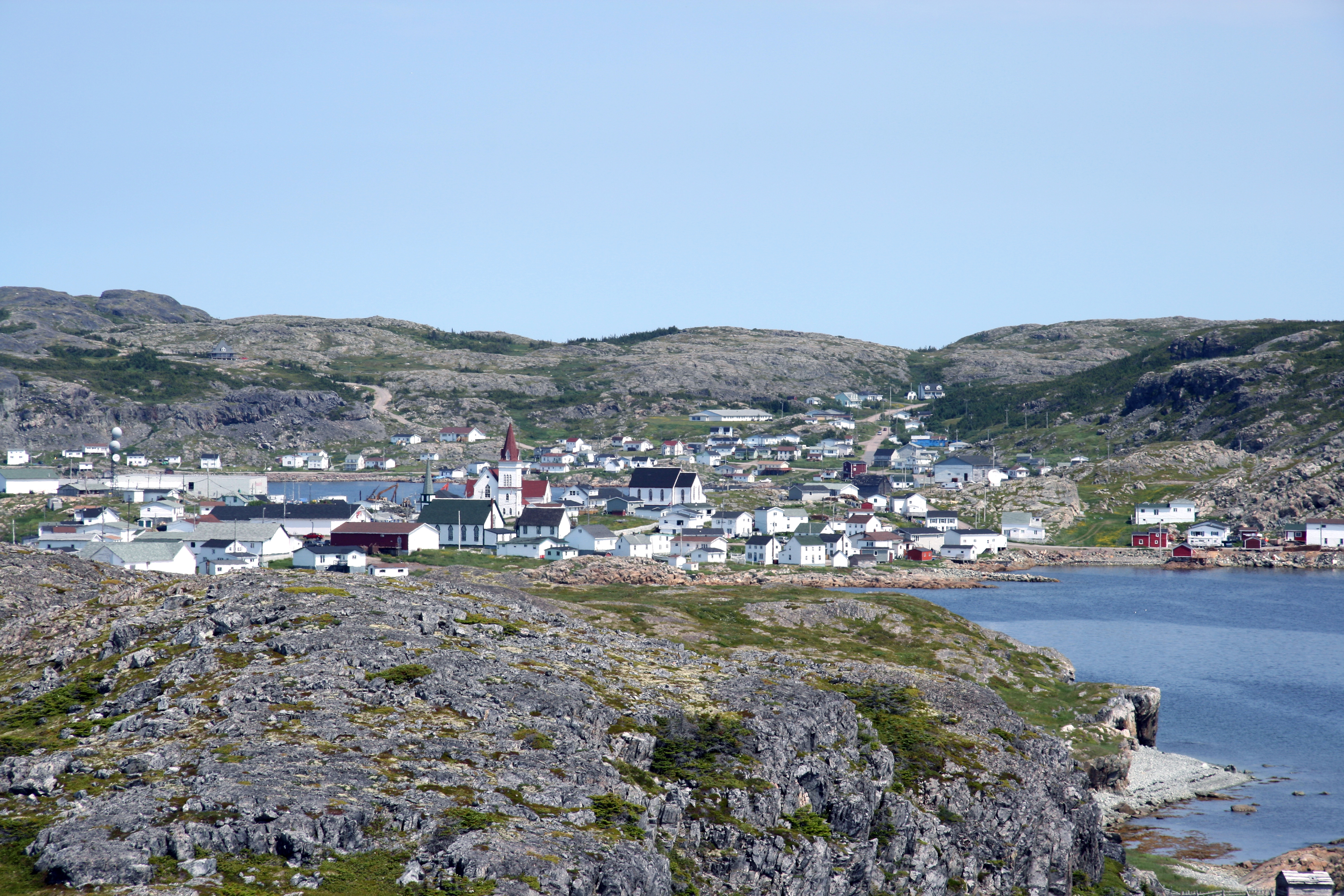
The town of Fogo, as seen from Brimstone Head

On March 1, 2011, the Town of Fogo amalgamated with other communities to become the Town of Fogo Island.

== See also ==
- Fogo Aerodrome
