= Tilting, Newfoundland and Labrador =

Tilting Tilton Harbor, Tilting Harbour
- Community
- Seal

- Location of Tilting in Newfoundland
- Coordinates: 49°42′N 54°04′W
- Country: Canada
- Province: Newfoundland and Labrador
- Settled: 1720s

Government
  - Mayor: Gerard E. Foley

Area
  - Total: 17.63 km^{2} (6.81 sq mi)

Population (2006)
  - Total: 248
  - Density: 14.1/km^{2} (37/sq mi)
- Time zone: UTC-3:30 (Newfoundland Time)
  - Summer (DST): UTC-2:30 (Newfoundland Daylight)
- Postal code span: A0G 4H0
- Area code: 709
- Highways: Route 334
- Website: Community of Tilting

National Historic Site of Canada
- Official name: Tlting National Historic Site of Canada
- Designated: 2003

Tilting is a community on the eastern end of Fogo Island off the northeast coast of Newfoundland in Newfoundland and Labrador, Canada. It was incorporated as a town before becoming part of the Town of Fogo Island through an amalgamation in 2011. The community has been designated as a National Historic Site of Canada, and has also been designated as a Registered Heritage District by the Heritage Foundation of Newfoundland and Labrador.

Tilting is noted for the large number of traditional Newfoundland fishing structures and houses, many of which have been restored in recent years. The community is noteworthy for the longevity of its Irish culture and dialect. It was first settled in the 1720s, though French fishers knew of, and used, Tilting as a summer fishing base from the 16th century until the early 18th century.

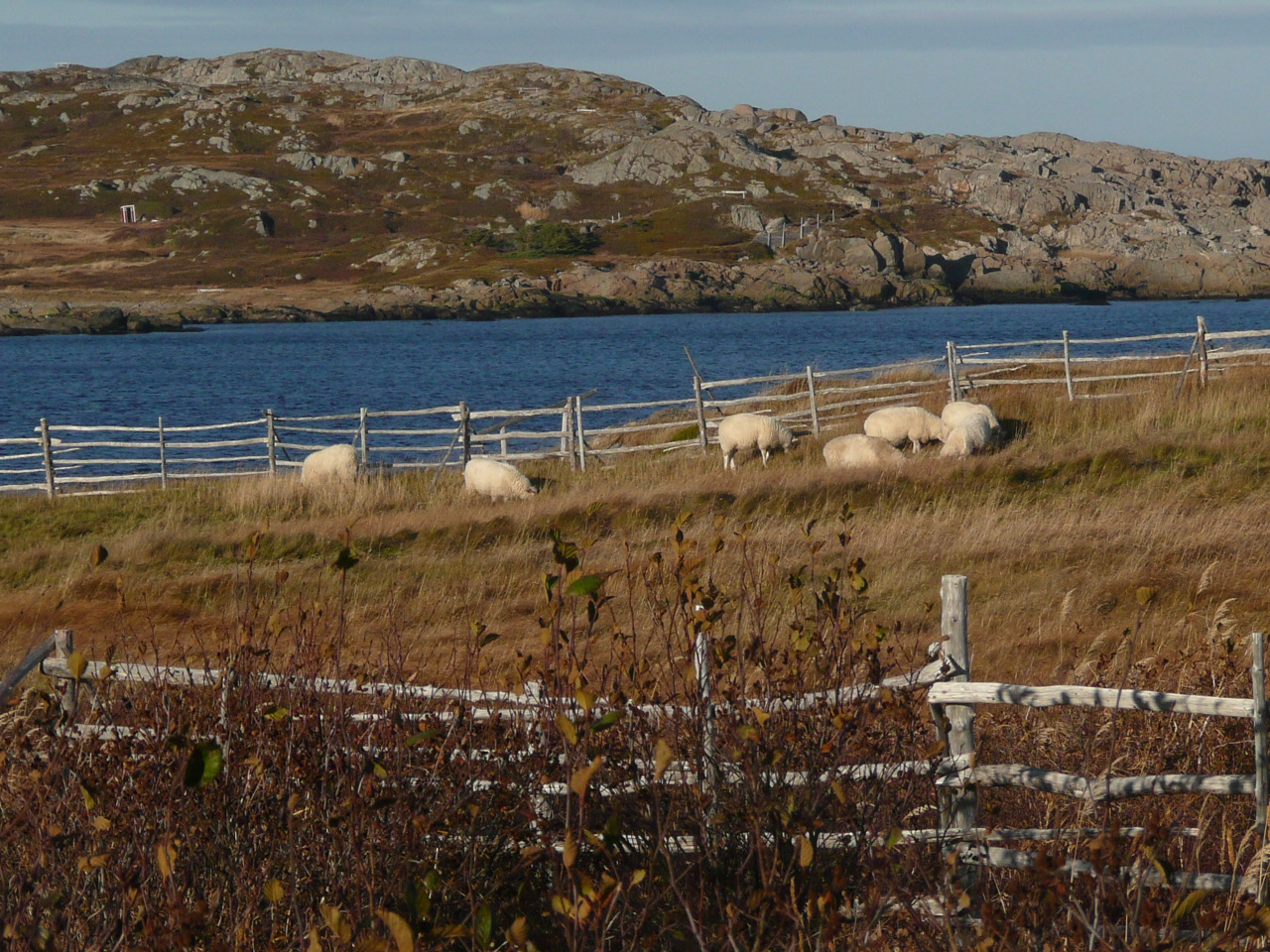
Sheep grazing alongside the Turpin's Trail interpretive trail in Tilting.

== History ==
Tilting is one of the most historically significant settlements in Eastern Canada. It is located on Fogo Island, one of the earliest venues for the prosecution of the migratory Atlantic cod fishery. Fogo was well known to early Basque, Portuguese and French fishers. French explorer Jacques Cartier sailed directly to Notre Dame Bay, in which Fogo Island is located, in 1534.

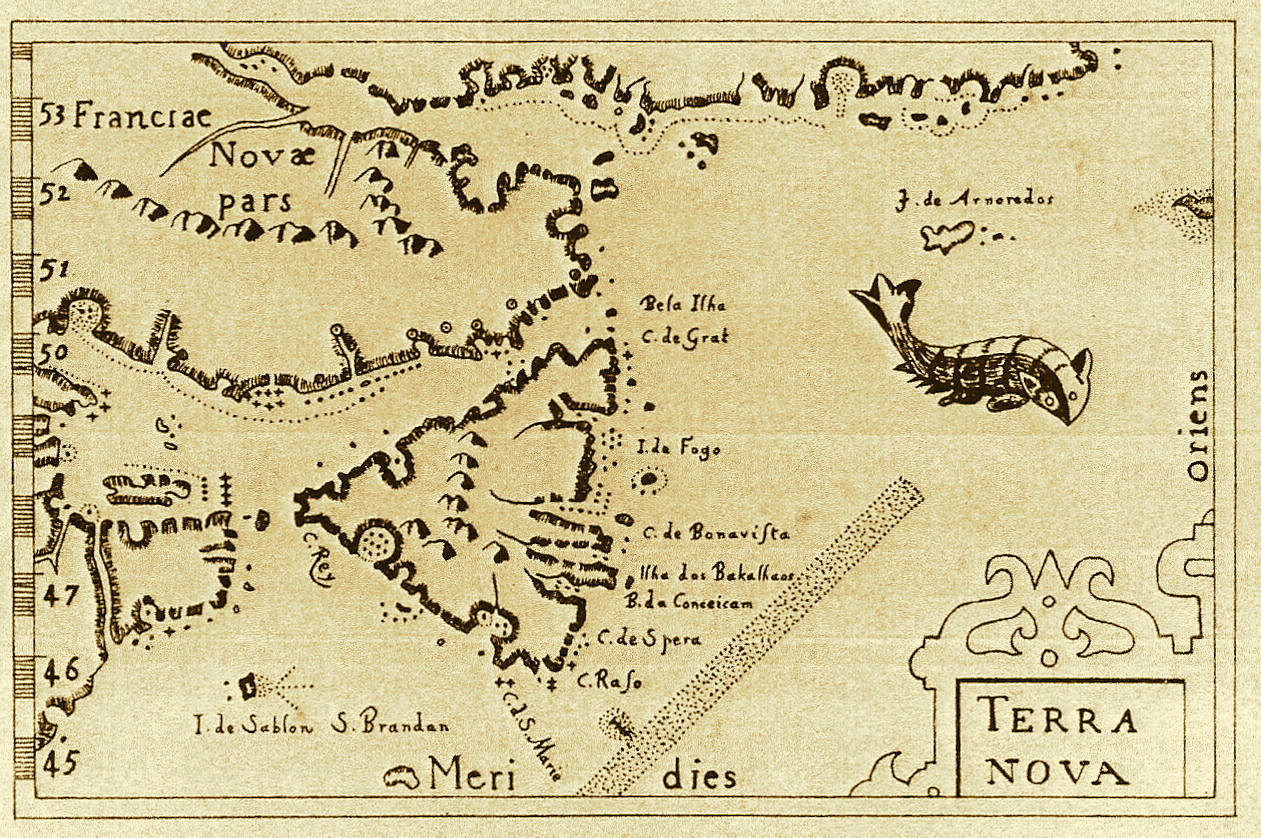
Fogo Island is one of the oldest named features in the New World, as indicated by its inclusion in the Pierre Bertius map of 1606 ("I. de Fogo").

Though Tilting was located on the "French Shore" area of Newfoundland, and was likely visited by French fishing crews in the early 16th century, there is no evidence that the French ever settled in Tilting. The style of fishery practised by the French did not require them to have permanent bases on land, but they did use temporary shore stations to process fish. The French also spent time on shore in order to collect wood and water, to wait out storms, and to repair their fishing craft. Local oral history indicates that Tilting was a French harbour before becoming a venue of Irish settlement. This is highly likely, given the traditional commercial and cultural links between southern Irish and northern French fishing ports. French documents from the 18th century refer to Tilting as "Tilken". Beginning around the 1720s, English migratory fishing crews began to probe northward from Trinity and Bonavista, and it is at this time that the first settlers probably over-wintered at places like Tilting. By the 1780s, Tilting evolved into an exclusively Irish enclave, beginning with the first visitors from Ireland around 1752, and continuing with the arrival of other Irish planters through the end of the 18th century.

In 1787, Notre Dame Bay was surveyed by Michael Lane, who had been working with the famous Captain James Cook, until Cook was recalled to England. Lane's map clearly shows that Tilting was a substantial and important fishing station and settlement by the 1780s.

Tilting detail from Michael Lane's survey map of Fogo Island, 1787. Look closely to see the key features of the map: Flakes in the outer harbour, sunken rocks (small x-marks) and Dominey's Brook in the northwest part of the Harbour. National Archives of the U.K., WO78/721

The origins of the name "Tilting" are unknown. Since Notre Dame Bay, in which Tilting is situated, was first used by French ship fishermen, the word "Tilting" may be French in origin. This is the case, for example, for nearby Twillingate, which was initially named "Toulinguet" by the French. For a while, colonial officials in St. John's mistakenly referred to Tilting as "Tilton Harbor" in some official documents. By the early 20th century, it was known as "Tilting Harbour" again.

The first settlers in Tilting were probably English bye-boat fishermen and planters; many of the prominent landmarks in Tilting have English names, such as Henning's Hill, Dominey's Brook, Chalk's Hill, and Trugard's. Eventually the Irish focused their settlement on Tilting, and the English moved away. This may have been because the large merchant in the area, Lester's of Trinity, placed an Irish agent named Ryan at Tilting, to serve the Irish and manage their accounts with Lester. Lester's initial interest in Tilting centred on the late-winter seal fishery. Lester sent large numbers of Irish passengers and workers to Tilting in the 1760s and 1770s, and good-naturedly referred to the planters of Tilting as "villians [sic]", probably because they had a reputation as hard bargainers. Thomas Burke was probably the first Irish planter to settle in Tilting, apparently in 1752. He had a substantial fishing business based out of Tilting and carried his fish and seals directly to St. John's rather than selling them to merchants on Fogo Island. Burke was a strong Catholic and allowed Mass to be said in his large stage, when this was technically forbidden by British officials. At the time, the Catholic faith was outlawed in England and its colonies, but travelling Irish priests occasionally visited outports like Tilting.

Other early Irish settlers at Tilting were men named Foley, Dwyer, McGrath, Broders, Mahoney, Lane, Reardon, Keefe, Sexton, and Greene. These names all still survive today among the residents of Tilting.

The oldest house in Tilting, the Lane House, is currently used as a museum. It may have been built in the late 18th century.

Another very old house is known as "Ryan's House" and may have belonged to Lester's agent Ryan (see above.) It is located on the Keefe premises.

The Irish Cemetery in Tilting may be the oldest existing exclusively Irish cemetery in North America.

France's Cove, just inside the entrance to Tilting Harbour, is probably the site of the early French summer fishing operations. Kelly's Island, adjacent to France's Cove, is thus the likely site of the earliest European settlement in the Tlting area.

Tilting has a large collection of original and restored Irish Newfoundland houses, stages, and other outbuildings. There are also traditional early-modern complexes of gardens outside and throughout the community, as well as traditional root cellars, slide paths, and wells. This substantial and rare collection of traditional structures and material culture contributed to Tilting's being designated a Registered Heritage District in 2003 (see below.)

Tilting's population was 393 in 1940 and 401 in 1956.

On March 1, 2011, the Town of Tilting amalgamated with other communities to become the Town of Fogo Island.

== Tilting National Historic Site ==
In 2003, Tilting was designated a National Historic Site by the Minister of the Environment, as recommended by the Historic Sites and Monuments Board of Canada. The citation reads as follows:

Tilting Cultural Landscape Irish settlers began to shape this landscape from about the 1730s, building houses and fishing rooms around the harbour to support the inshore fishery. Influenced by the inheritance customs of their homeland, Tilting's residents subdivided the original land lots, developing clusters of extended family neighbourhoods. They also adapted the Irish tradition of keeping gardens, with those near home more intensively cultivated and those farther away used mainly for hay or crops for winter storage. Like other Newfoundlanders, they enclosed their fields with wooden fences and pastured livestock on the open commons. Many of Tilting's landscape components, including the harbour, the extensive gardens near Sandy Cove and Oliver's Cove, and the summer and winter paths, are used in much the same way today as in the past. While continuing to evolve, this community retains an unusually complete range of vernacular building types, and the arrangements and interrelationships of traditional buildings and spaces have largely been maintained. Still inhabited by descendants of its early families, Tilting survives as a rare example of a once common Irish-Newfoundland cultural landscape. (Historic Sites and Monuments Board of Canada, August 27, 2005.)

== Tilting Registered Heritage District ==
In 2003 Tilting was designated a Registered Heritage District by the Heritage Foundation of Newfoundland and Labrador. It was the first time the Foundation recognized an entire community for its significance to Newfoundland and Labrador's heritage. The citation reads as follows:

Tilting Originally founded by the French in the 17th century as a base for their transatlantic fishery, Tilting became a station for the English and Irish migratory fishery sometime after 1713. Permanent settlement followed in the 1720s and by the 1770s it had become a predominantly Irish community, shortly evolving into an exclusively Irish preserve. The cultural milieu in which those early Irish thrived is evidenced today both in the material culture and vibrant oral traditions for which Tilting is so well known. Tilting is one of the few rural Newfoundland communities where the full range of the buildings associated with the traditional family-based, inshore fishery can still be experienced.

== See also ==
- Fishing stage
- List of cities and towns in Newfoundland and Labrador
