= Change Islands =

- Town
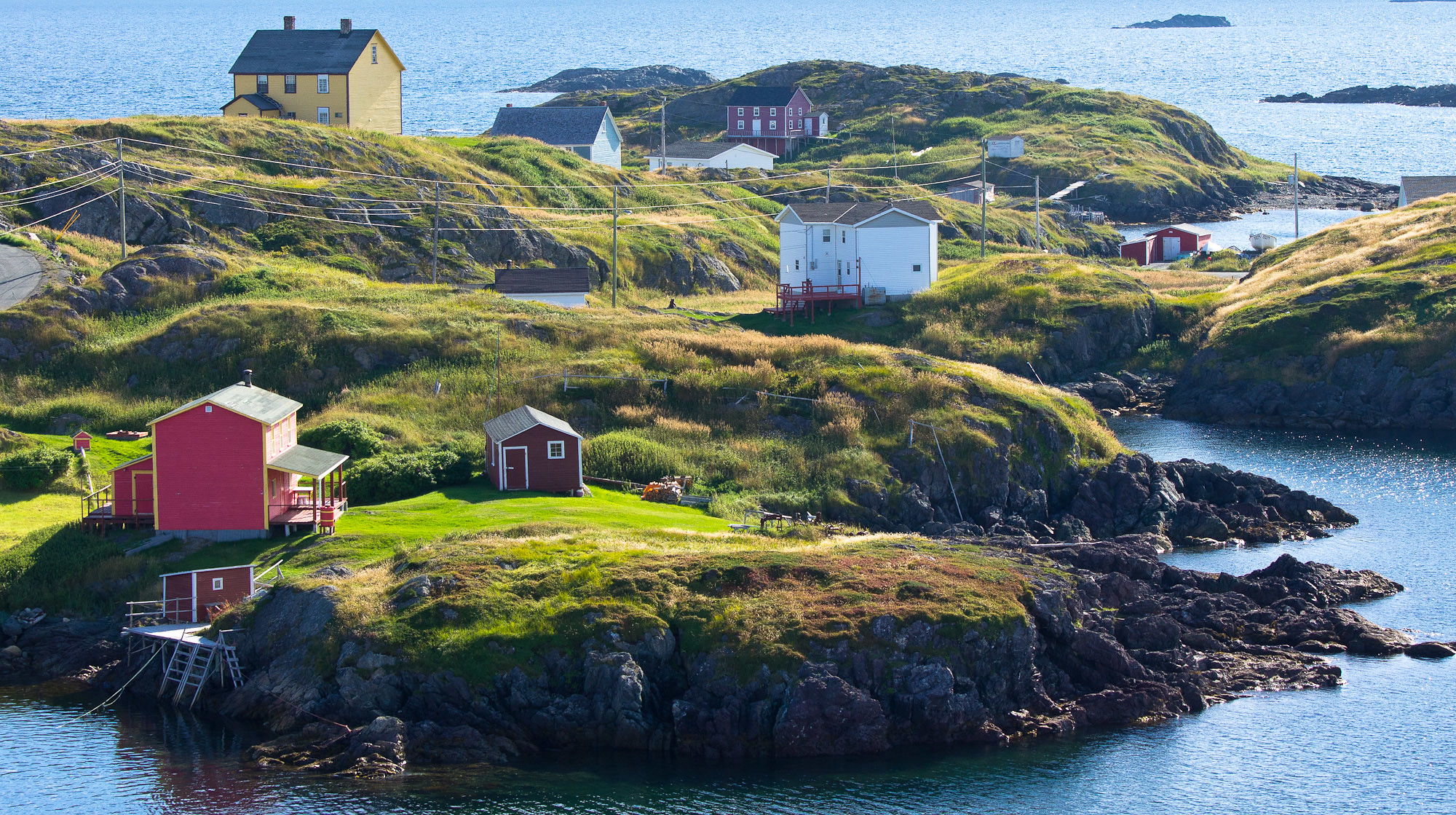

- Location of Change Islands in Newfoundland
- Coordinates: 49.67194°N 54.40790°W
- Country: Canada
- Province: Newfoundland and Labrador
- Settled: Mid-18th century

Area
  - Land: 5.31 km^{2} (2.05 sq mi)

Population (2021)
  - Total: 184
  - Density: 39.2/km^{2} (102/sq mi)
- Time zone: UTC-3:30 (Newfoundland Time)
  - Summer (DST): UTC-2:30 (Newfoundland Daylight)
- Area code: 709
- Highways: MV Veteran
- Website: changeislands.ca

Change Islands is an outport community in the Canadian province of Newfoundland and Labrador.

The community spans two small islands of the same name which lie off the northeast coast of the island of Newfoundland between Notre Dame Bay and the Labrador Sea.

The community of Change Islands is located primarily on the larger South Island, today hosting approximately 184 residents, though most of the public buildings are on the North Island.

The Newfoundland Pony Refuge is located on Change Islands.

== Geography ==
The southern and northern Change Islands are separated by a "tickle" (a narrow strait, in Newfoundland English).

The South Island is larger, containing more marshes/bogs, and wooded area, the North Island is smaller, mostly barren. It is located in Notre Dame Bay, on the northeast coast of the island of Newfoundland.

The community was first established as a series of random settlements around the islands tied to seasonal fishing activity which developed into a cohesive community, but by the early 1960s only Red Rock Cove (at the middle of the southern island) and Woody Island Tickle (approximately at the ferry terminal at the south of the southern island) remained. Most of the remaining settlements (Granpher's Cove, etc.) on either side of the tickle effectively incorporated into one entity. Remoter places (Gannis Island, etc.) were gradually abandoned. The first European settlers arrived sometime in the mid-18th century to fish.

The residents of Change Islands have preserved many of their traditional homes, stages, and stores (fishing sheds); many of these landmarks are disappearing in much of coastal Newfoundland and Labrador with the collapse of the ground fishery.

There are a few accommodation facilities on the islands, which are accessible by the MV Veteran, the provincially operated ferry from Farewell that also services Fogo Island further to the east.

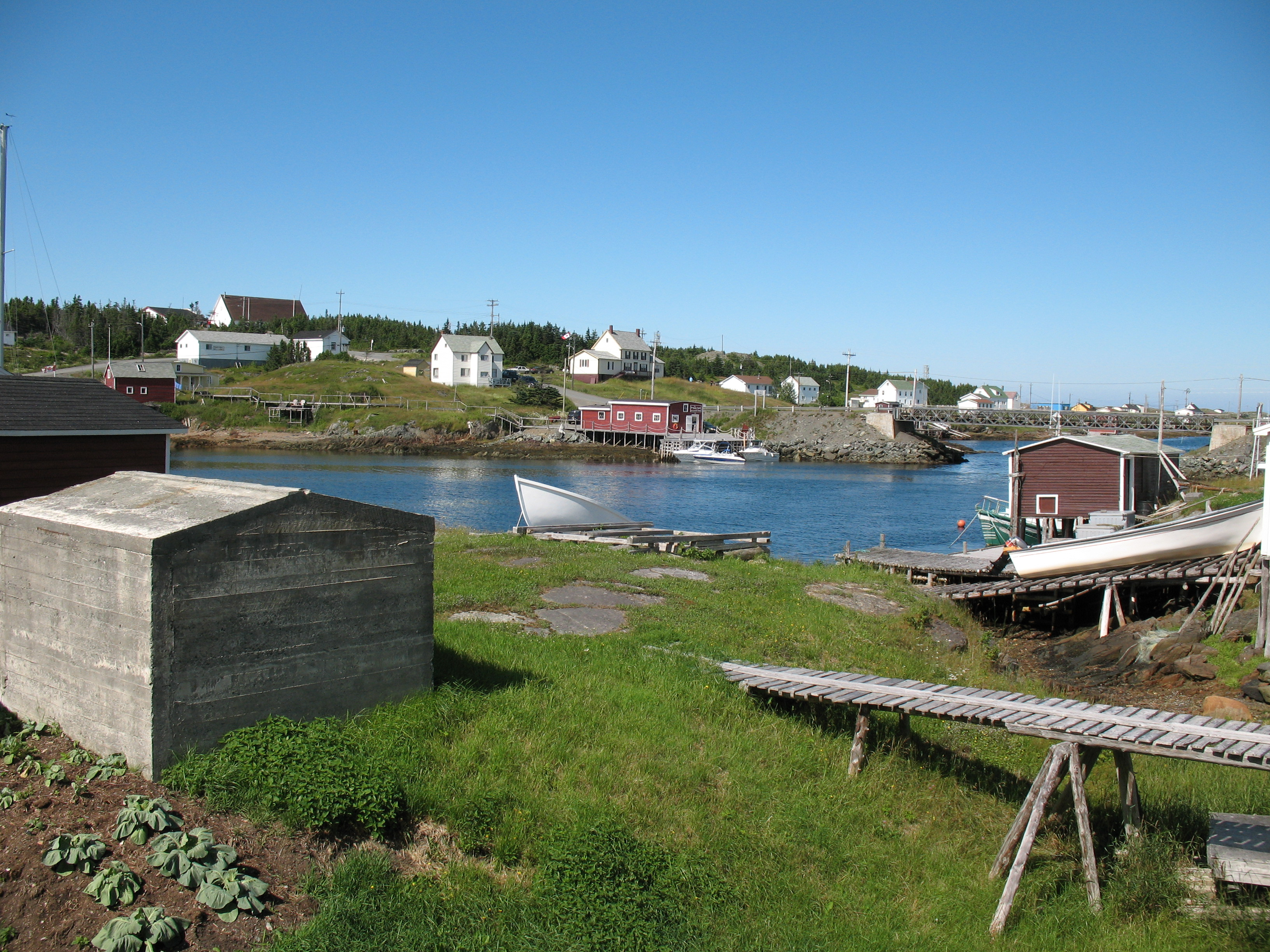
A view of the tickle in Change Islands

== Demographics ==
In the 2021 Census of Population conducted by Statistics Canada, Change Islands had a population of 184 living in 104 of its 204 total private dwellings, a change of −11.5% from its 2016 population of 208. With a land area of 5.36 km^{2} (2.07 sq mi), it had a population density of 34.3/km^{2} (88.9/sq mi) in 2021.

== People ==
- Artist Gerald Squires was born in Change Islands.

== See also ==
- Fishing stage
- List of municipalities in Newfoundland and Labrador
