= MV Veteran =

Ferry boat operating in Newfoundland & Labrador, Canada

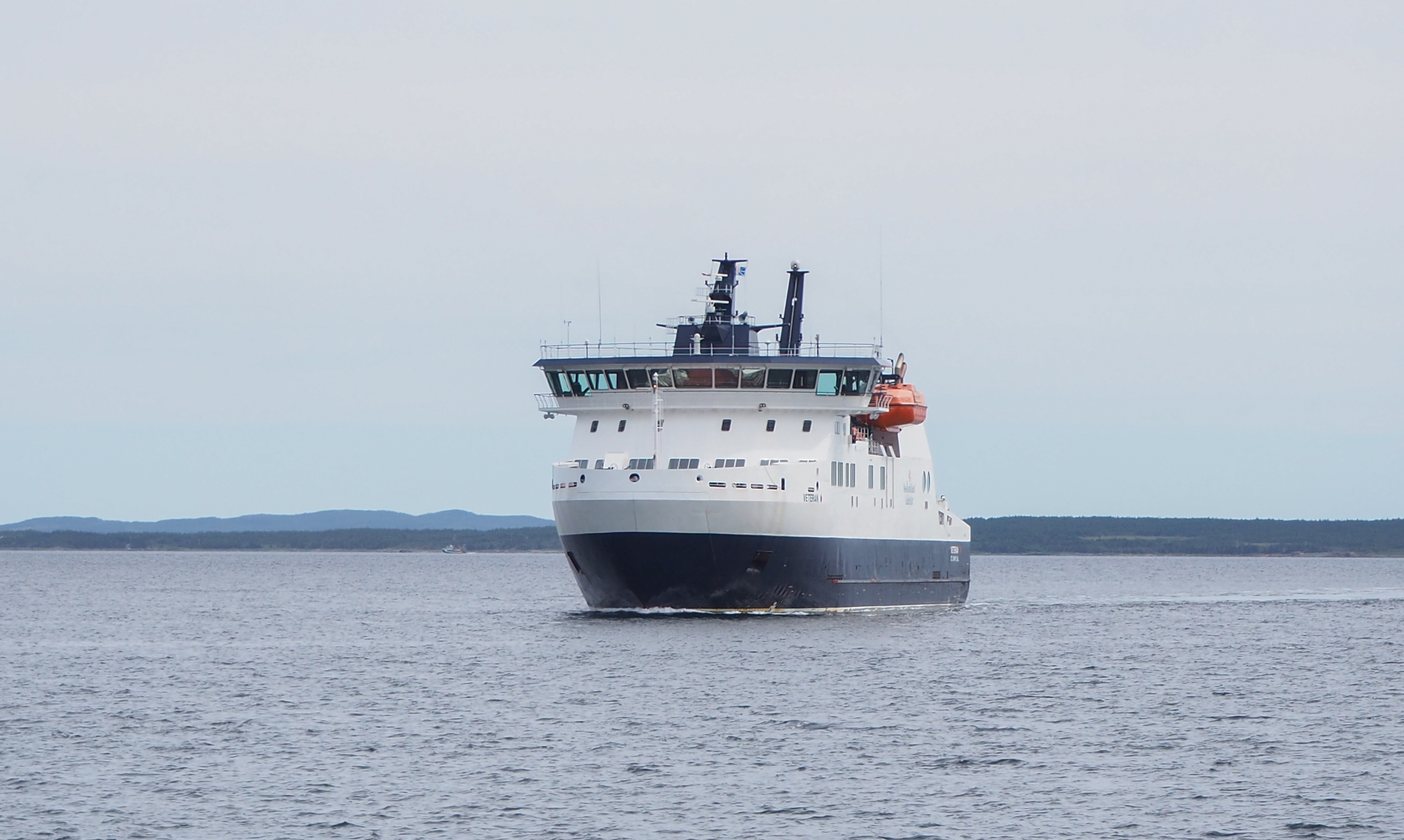

History
- Name: Veteran
- Operator: Newfoundland Department of Transportation and Infrastructure
- Route: Farewell – Fogo and Change Islands
- Builder: Damen Group, Galați, Romania
- Cost: CA $50 million
- Yard number: 539305
- Launched: 27 March 2015
- Identification: IMO number: 9736901; MMSI number: 316014210; Callsign: XJCA
- Status: In service

General characteristics
- Type: Ropax ferry
- Tonnage: 4,459 GT
- Length: 81.05 m (265 ft 11 in)
- Beam: 17.20 m (56 ft 5 in)
- Draught: 4.3 m (14 ft 1 in)
- Ice class: 1A Super
- Installed power: 3,200 kW (4,300 hp)
- Propulsion: Diesel-electric; 2 x 1600 KW Rolls-Royce azimuth thrusters
- Speed: 14 knots (26 km/h; 16 mph)
- Capacity: 200 passengers; 64 vehicles

MV Veteran is a ferry operating in the province of Newfoundland and Labrador, Canada. She is operated by the provincial Department of Transportation and Infrastructure, entering service on the route from Newfoundland to Fogo Island and Change Islands at the end of 2015.

Veteran is the first of two vessels built for the province by Damen Group in Galați, Romania. The second, MV Legionnaire, currently serves the Portugal Cove-St. Philip's to Bell Island route, alongside the MV Flanders. The vessels' names commemorate the centennial of the Royal Newfoundland Regiment's landing at Gallipoli, in the Ottoman Empire in 1915.
