= Fogo Island, Newfoundland and Labrador =

Municipality in Canada

Fogo Island
- Municipality
- Town of Fogo Island
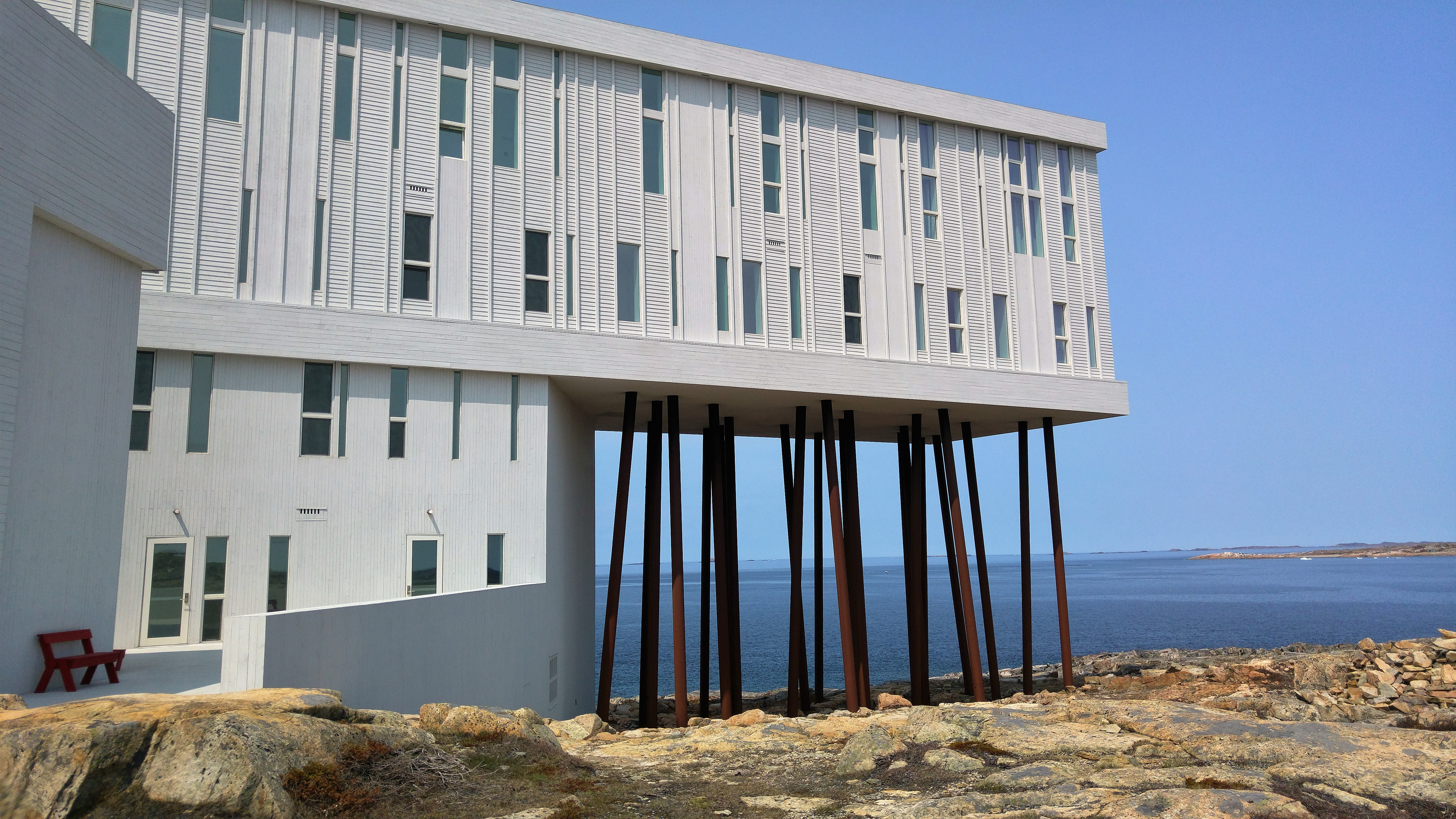
- Fogo Island Inn

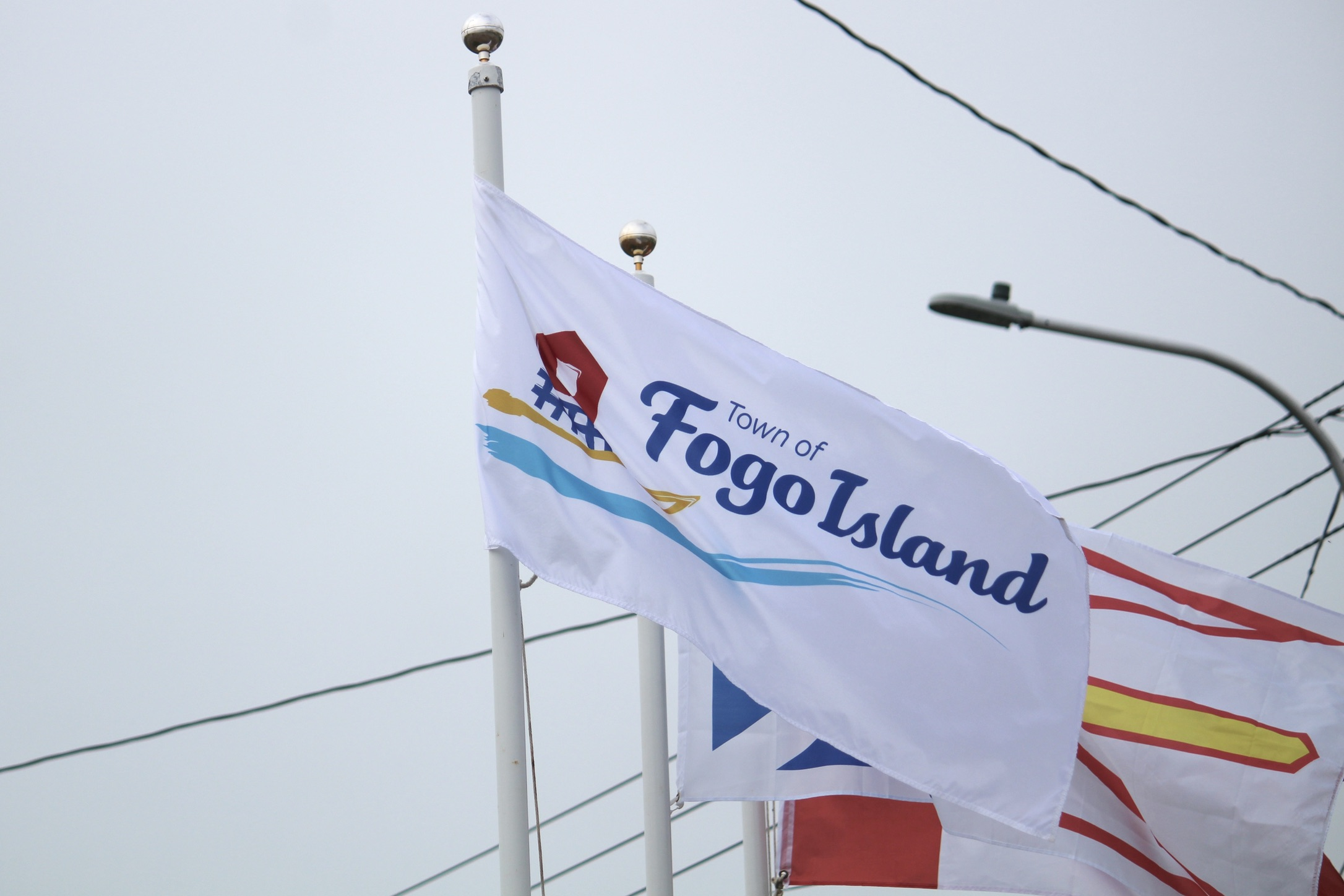
- Flag

- Location of Fogo Island in Newfoundland
- Coordinates: 49°39′30″N 54°10′57″W
- Country: Canada
- Province: Newfoundland and Labrador
- Incorporated: March 1, 2011

Government
  - Type: Town Council
  - Mayor: Andrew Shea
  - Vice Mayor: Damian Roebotham
  - MHA: Jim McKenna (Fogo Island-Cape Freels)
  - MP: Clifford Small (Coast of Bays-Central-Notre Dame)

Population (2021)
  - Total: 2,117
- Time zone: UTC-03:30 (NST)
  - Summer (DST): UTC-02:30 (NDT)
- Area code: 709
- Highways: MV Veteran; Route 333; Route 334
- Website: Town of Fogo Island

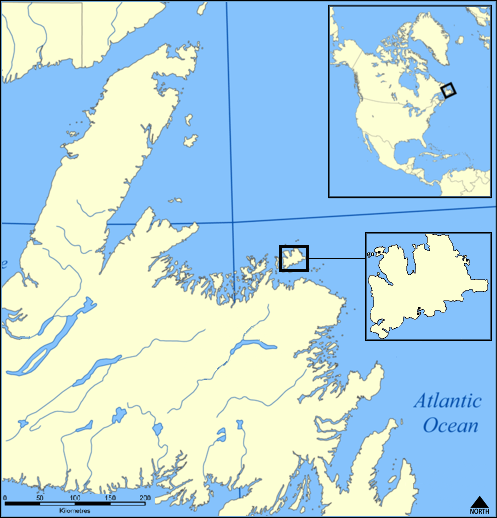
Location of Fogo Island

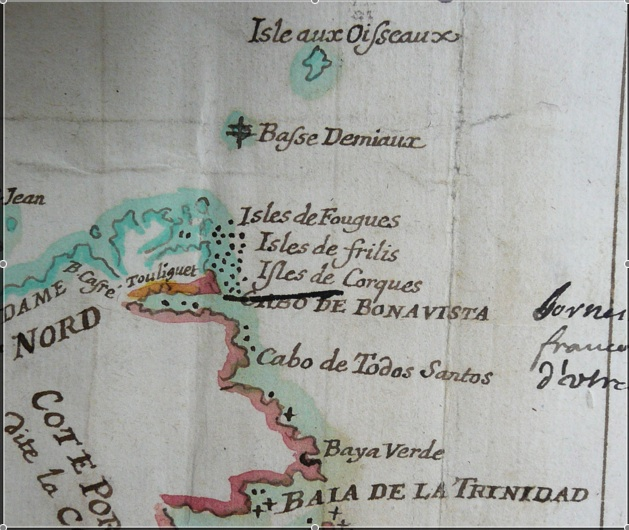
French Map (1713) of northeast Newfoundland showing Fogo Island ("Isles de Fougues") - National Archives of The United Kingdom, MPF1/225

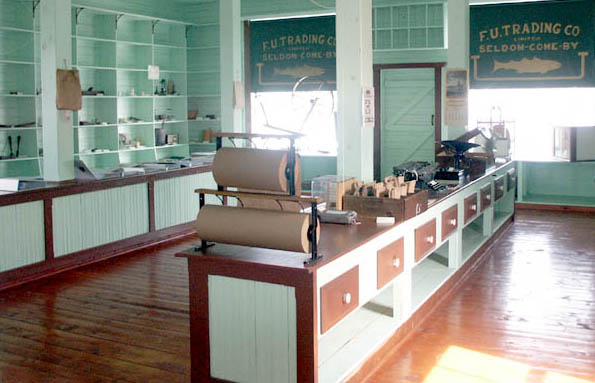
Fishermen's Protective Union general store, Seldom-Come-By, Newfoundland

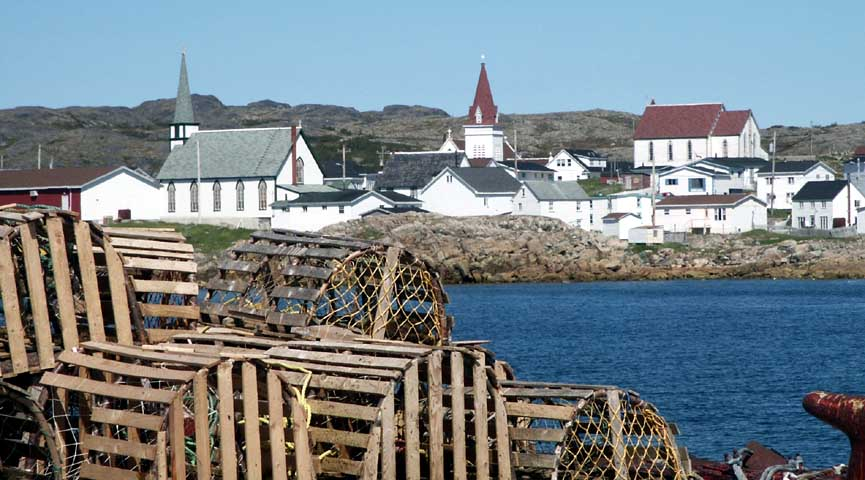
Fogo, Newfoundland

Fogo Island is the largest of the offshore islands of Newfoundland and Labrador, Canada. It lies off the northeast coast of Newfoundland, northwest of Musgrave Harbour across Hamilton Sound, just east of the Change Islands. The island is about 25 km (16 mi) long and 14 km (8.7 mi) wide. The total area is 237.71 km^{2} (91.78 sq mi).

On March 1, 2011, the Town of Fogo Island was incorporated, encompassing the island in its entirety and consisting of the former towns of Fogo, Joe Batt's Arm-Barr'd Islands-Shoal Bay, Seldom-Little Seldom, Tilting and the previously unincorporated areas of the island.

== Toponomy ==
Fogo Island is one of the oldest named features on the coast of Newfoundland. The Bertius map from 1606 shows Fogo Island as one of only about a dozen important features around the coast of Newfoundland. On French maps of the 16th to 18th centuries, the island is referred to as Ile des Fougues. The island was likely named by Portuguese explorers and early fishing crews in the 16th century (Fogo means Fire in Portuguese).

Fogo Island was once called Ilha do Fogo, meaning Isle of Fire. There are a number of theories for the name:

- Many accidental or natural forest fires destroyed the dense forests of the northern part of the island;
- European mariners often saw the burning fires of the Beothuk natives;
- The island may have been named Fogo after the Cape Verde Island's active volcano.

== History ==
Beothuk traversed Fogo Island for many hundreds of years before Irish and English settlers arrived. The Beothuk pursued the seal and salmon fisheries in the area. They also travelled out to the Funk Islands to collect feathers and eggs from the birds there. In the early years of European settlement at Fogo, there were incidents of violence between the Beothuk and the Europeans. This contact ended around the year 1800. The Beothuk became extinct as a people in the late 1820s.

Though migratory French fishermen visited Fogo Island from the early 16th century until 1718, the first permanent European settlement of the island took place in the 18th century. Fogo Harbour and Tilting Harbour were the first settlements on the island.

Until 1783, Fogo Island was on an area of the coast called the French Shore. Though English and Irish were not supposed to settle here, under the terms of the Treaty of Utrecht, they did settle; by 1750, Fogo was a thriving part of the British mercantile system of fisheries, based out of West Country English towns such as Poole, in Dorset.

Fogo Island first attracted Europeans because of the extensive opportunities for commodity harvesting, including seal skins and oil, lumber, fur-bearing animals, salmon, and cod. Over time, settlers on the island concentrated on processing dried cod.

Residents defeated the Smallwood government's plans to resettle Fogo Islanders elsewhere in the 1950s but by 1967 a downturn in the inshore fishery had forced many to turn to welfare support. In 1967, the island played a key role in the development of what came to be known as the "Fogo Process," a model for community media as a tool for addressing community concerns, when an Extension field worker from Memorial University, Fred Earle, and Colin Low shot 27 films with Fogo Islanders as part of the National Film Board of Canada's Challenge for Change program.

The northern cod fishery closed in 1992. Crab and lobster fisheries have largely replaced the cod fishery; a fish-packing plant remains in operation in the town of Fogo. The economy of the island has diversified into tourism and cultural industries.

The Town of Fogo Island was incorporated on March 1, 2011 following the amalgamation of four towns – Fogo, Joe Batt's Arm-Barr'd Islands-Shoal Bay, Seldom-Little Seldom and Tilting – with the unincorporated balance of the Fogo Island. The last physician was due to leave the island in June 2022; medical care at that point only being available via a six-hour round trip by ferry, weather permitting.

== Historic sites ==
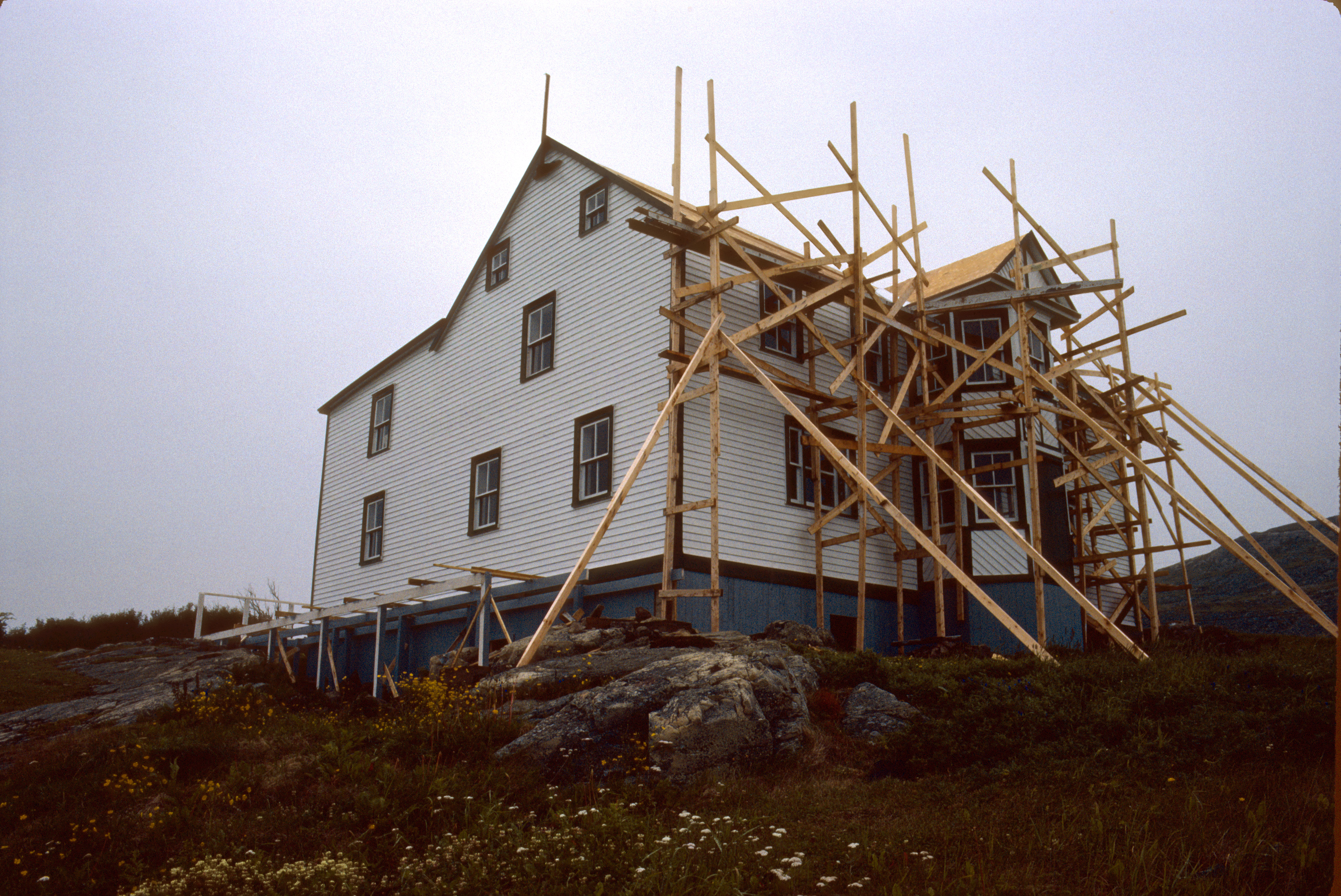
The 1826-1827 Bleak House, Fogo, shown here under restoration circa 1986.

=== Bleak House Registered Heritage Structure ===
Bleak House in Fogo was constructed 1826-1827 for Fogo merchant John Slade. The Earle family made extensive alterations to the house after they took over the associated business in 1897. A large dwelling with a centre-hall plan, the house was constructed with a summer kitchen at the back of the house, set there to take advantage of cool breezes and to remove the heat of cooking fires from the principal part of the house.

The building was donated to the Fogo town council in 1981. A restoration project in 1984 included work by youth participants in the Katimavik program. The youth also worked to catalogue artefacts in the building, with the assistance of the Newfoundland and Labrador Museums Association.

The building was designated in 1986 as a Registered Heritage Structure by the Heritage Foundation of Newfoundland and Labrador. A ceremony to mark the designation was held by the foundation on 24 August 1986.

=== Tilting Registered Heritage District ===
Tilting Harbour on Fogo Island is a National Cultural Landscape District of Canada and has been designated as a Registered Heritage District by the Heritage Foundation of Newfoundland and Labrador. The provincial designation was announced by then board chair Ruth Canning on 21 June 21 2003.

The National Cultural Landscape District designation notes that the heritage value of Tilting lies in the nature, diversity and range of the individual resources within its cultural landscape, and their complex interrelationships. One example is the ongoing summer tradition of transporting sheep from Tilting to nearby Pigeon Island, allowing them to free range. Another is the "extensive and remarkable 'gardens,' or fenced-in fields, variously located adjacent to their owners' houses or more often in clusters, some distance away."

Local oral history indicates that Tilting was originally a French harbour before becoming a venue of Irish settlement. This is highly likely, given the traditional commercial and cultural links between southern Irish and northern French fishing ports. The first Irish settled in Tilting in the 1750s; it evolved into a predominantly Irish and Catholic community by the 1780s. The parish of Tilting was established in 1835.

In 2022, the Tilting Recreation and Cultural Society (TRACS) and Heritage NL began a preliminary inventory of traditional skill holders in the area.

=== Fisherman's Union Trading Company Building ===
Before Confederation with Canada, the mercantile classes of St John's, Newfoundland became rich by holding a near-monopoly stranglehold on both the supply of goods to the Newfoundland outports and on the sale of fish from them. In the early 20th century, the Fisherman's Protective Union was formed in an attempt to break this stranglehold. It was a form of co-operative with general stores owned by fishermen for fishermen. One of the Fishermen's Union stores still stands at Seldom-Come-By on Fogo Island, now open as a museum complete with general store, port installations, fishing implements and equipment for the manufacture of cod-liver oil.

=== Marconi Station ===
A Marconi radio transmitting station was once operational atop a hill near the town of Fogo; operating with a spark-gap transmitter to establish maritime communications, the station was forced to close around the time that radio became common for household use as the spark-gap design generated unacceptable levels of radio interference. Efforts to rebuild this station as a historic site commenced in 2002.

== Tourism and attractions ==
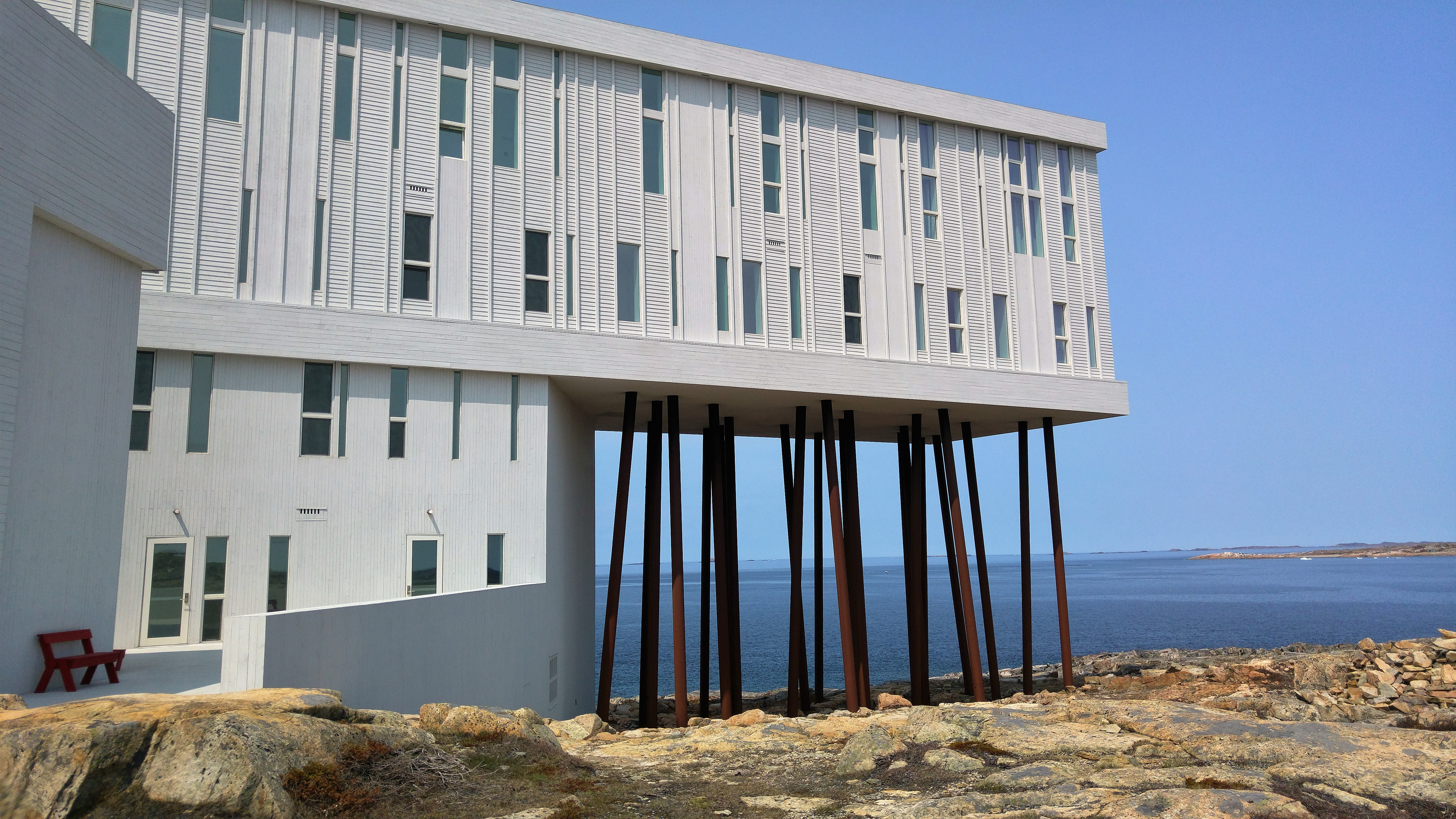
Fogo Island Inn

The island attracts a wide range of visitors interested in its history, local wildlife and other attractions. It has seven hiking trails, such as Lion's Den, Brimstone Head, Turpin's and Joe Batt's Point Trail. It also has ten Town-owned local museums and heritage properties, including the Marine Interpretation Centre, the Lane House Museum, and the Bleak House Museum. There are also museums run by local individuals, including Mona's Quilts & Jams and the Museum of the Flat Earth, now closed.

Fogo Island Arts (launched in 2008) provides a platform for contemporary art on the island, via a series of residencies hosted at different studios around Fogo.

Fogo Island appears in fictional form in the novel Blaze Island by Catherine Bush. The popular thriller TV series, Severance, filmed season 2, episode 8, on Fogo Island.

=== Brimstone Head Folk Festival ===
The community of Fogo in Fogo Island is home to the Brimstone Head Folk Festival, hosted by the Fogo Island Folk Alliance. This event attracts people from all over every year in early August. Performers consist of many bands which have included The Masterless Men, The Irish Descendants, Middle Tickle, The Fogo Island Accordion Group, Shores of Newfoundland, The Affections and many other local performers such as Aaron Brown, Sally Payne and Jason Hoven.

Brimstone Head was touted as one of the four corners of the world by the tongue-in-cheek Flat Earth Society of Canada (not related to the Flat Earth Society).

Along with the Brimstone Head Folk Festival, other communities have festivals as well. Joe Batt's Arm hosts the Ethridge's Point Seaside Fest, which usually takes place during the first weekend in August, the weekend before the Brimstone Head festival.

=== Notable people ===
- Zita Cobb – founder of Shorefast
- Rob Furlong - world record holder for longest recorded sniper kill March 2002 - November 2009

== Transportation ==
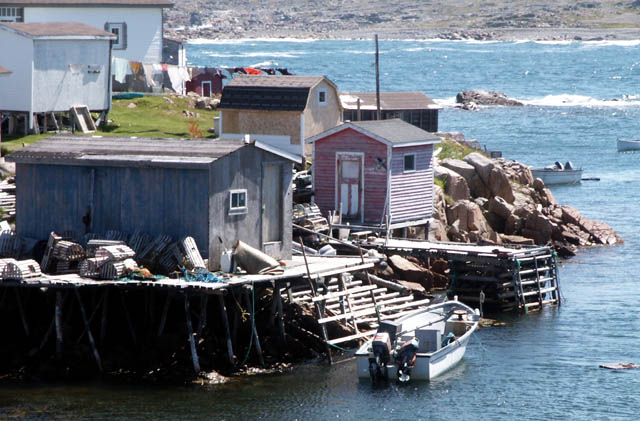
Fishing stages in Fogo, Newfoundland

Fogo Island is accessible by ferry or air. The local airstrip is the Fogo Aerodrome. The island is connected to mainland Newfoundland by the ferry MV Veteran, and is served by the Fogo Aerodrome airport. The primary roads on the island are Route 333 (Fogo Island Road) and Route 334 (Joe Batt’s Arm Road), as well as Deep Bay Road and Island Harbour Road.

== Climate ==
Fogo Island has a marine-based subarctic climate (Dfc) bordering on a cold humid continental climate (Dfb) with cooler summers than inland areas of Newfoundland as well as milder winters than areas on the same parallels in interior Canada. However, due to the very cool characteristics of summer months, Fogo Island in many ways resembles the subarctic range. The fourth warmest month of June just straddles 10 °C (50 °F) in mean temperature. As typical of Newfoundland and its surroundings precipitation is high and consistent year-round, which results in more than 3.5 m (11 ft) of snowfall on average in winter. Due to the extreme seasonal lag autumn is much warmer than spring, and as such the coldest and warmest months are February and August, respectively.

Climate data for Fogo Island (1981–2010, extremes 1873–2004)
Month	Jan	Feb	Mar	Apr	May	Jun	Jul	Aug	Sep	Oct	Nov	Dec	Year
Record high °C (°F)	15.5 (59.9)	12.5 (54.5)	18.0 (64.4)	24.0 (75.2)	27.0 (80.6)	29.5 (85.1)	31.5 (88.7)	30.6 (87.1)	28.0 (82.4)	25.0 (77.0)	18.3 (64.9)	15.6 (60.1)	31.5 (88.7)
Mean daily maximum °C (°F)	−3.0 (26.6)	−3.3 (26.1)	−0.2 (31.6)	3.6 (38.5)	9.2 (48.6)	14.3 (57.7)	18.9 (66.0)	19.5 (67.1)	15.3 (59.5)	9.5 (49.1)	4.4 (39.9)	0.6 (33.1)	7.4 (45.3)
Daily mean °C (°F)	−5.9 (21.4)	−6.9 (19.6)	−3.5 (25.7)	0.8 (33.4)	5.4 (41.7)	9.9 (49.8)	14.6 (58.3)	15.8 (60.4)	12.1 (53.8)	7.1 (44.8)	2.2 (36.0)	−1.8 (28.8)	4.2 (39.6)
Mean daily minimum °C (°F)	−8.8 (16.2)	−10.3 (13.5)	−6.7 (19.9)	−2.0 (28.4)	1.6 (34.9)	5.5 (41.9)	10.3 (50.5)	12.1 (53.8)	8.9 (48.0)	4.6 (40.3)	−0.1 (31.8)	−4.2 (24.4)	0.9 (33.6)
Record low °C (°F)	−24.0 (−11.2)	−30.6 (−23.1)	−26.5 (−15.7)	−16.5 (2.3)	−12.2 (10.0)	−6.7 (19.9)	−1.7 (28.9)	0.0 (32.0)	0.0 (32.0)	−7.0 (19.4)	−13.3 (8.1)	−22.8 (−9.0)	−30.6 (−23.1)
Average precipitation mm (inches)	104.5 (4.11)	104.2 (4.10)	99.9 (3.93)	86.4 (3.40)	78.7 (3.10)	82.3 (3.24)	91.0 (3.58)	102.4 (4.03)	111.8 (4.40)	116.9 (4.60)	101.5 (4.00)	107.3 (4.22)	1,187 (46.73)
Average rainfall mm (inches)	17.4 (0.69)	21.9 (0.86)	33.4 (1.31)	55.0 (2.17)	74.9 (2.95)	80.6 (3.17)	91.0 (3.58)	102.4 (4.03)	111.8 (4.40)	114.2 (4.50)	85.5 (3.37)	48.9 (1.93)	837.1 (32.96)
Average snowfall cm (inches)	87.1 (34.3)	82.4 (32.4)	66.5 (26.2)	31.4 (12.4)	3.7 (1.5)	1.7 (0.7)	0.0 (0.0)	0.0 (0.0)	0.0 (0.0)	2.7 (1.1)	16.0 (6.3)	58.4 (23.0)	349.9 (137.8)
Average precipitation days (≥ 0.2 mm)	17.2	15.9	15.8	15.4	15.7	15.3	16.5	13.5	14.4	18.6	15.8	17.3	191.3
Average rainy days (≥ 0.2 mm)	3.6	4.5	6.6	10.2	15.4	15.2	16.5	13.5	14.4	18.4	13.9	9.2	141.3
Average snowy days (≥ 0.2 cm)	15.3	12.8	11.3	6.9	0.93	0.15	0.0	0.0	0.0	0.50	3.3	9.9	61.1
Source: Environment Canada

== Demographics ==
In the 2021 Census of Population conducted by Statistics Canada, Fogo Island had a population of 2,117 living in 964 of its 1,450 total private dwellings, a change of −5.7% from its 2016 population of 2,244. With a land area of 238.25 km^{2} (91.99 sq mi), it had a population density of 8.9/km^{2} (23.0/sq mi) in 2021. Fogo Island had a population of 2,706 people in the 2006 census, 2,395 in the 2011 census, and 2,244 in the 2016 census.

Stag Harbour is a designated place in the Canadian province of Newfoundland and Labrador. It is in Newfoundland on Fogo Island within Division No. 8. As a designated place in the 2016 Census of Population conducted by Statistics Canada, Stag Harbour recorded a population of 165 living in 70 of its 91 total private dwellings, a change of 2.5% from its 2011 population of 161. With a land area of 8.48 km^{2} (3.27 sq mi), it had a population density of 19.5/km^{2} (50.4/sq mi) in 2016.

Name	Former status	Population (2016)	Population (2011)	Per cent change (%)	Occupied dwellings	Private dwellings	Land area (km²)	Population density
Fogo	Town	658	658	0.0	289	349	5.92	111.2
Joe Batt's Arm-Barr'd Islands-Shoal Bay	Town	630	685	-8.0	282	399	26.02	24.2
Seldom-Little Seldom	Town	386	427	-9.6	151	180	14.60	26.4
Tilting	Town	173	204	-15.2	84	152	17.63	9.8
Balance of Fogo Island	Unincorporated	397	421	-5.7	979	1,460	173.48	2.3
Fogo Island		2,244	2,395	-6.3	979	1,460	237.65	9.4

== See also ==
- Fogo Island Inn
- List of communities in Newfoundland and Labrador
- Shorefast, a charity devoted to the economic development of the island
