= Fishing stage =

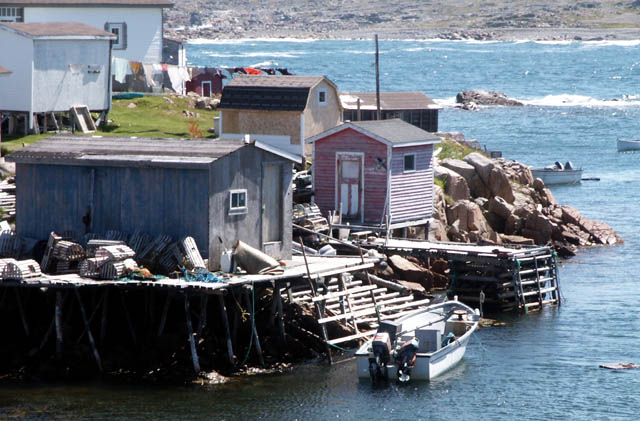
Fishing stages in Fogo, Newfoundland

A fishing stage is a wooden vernacular building, typical of the rough traditional buildings associated with the cod fishery in Newfoundland, Canada. Stages are located at the water's edge or "landwash", and consist of an elevated platform on the shore with working tables and sheds at which fish are landed and processed for salting and drying. Traditionally, they are painted with a red ochre paint, though colours other than red are sometimes seen.

The stage is unique among British and North American outbuildings because unlike the typical uses of agricultural structures, both the slaughter and the processing of a harvested animal takes place within this space. While barns and stables were intended for year-round housing of live animals, the stage would be used only for several months during the summer, and not as a shelter for livestock.

== See also ==
- Fish flake
- Heritage Foundation of Newfoundland and Labrador
- Newfoundland and Labrador
- Newfoundland outport
