= Newfoundland outport =

Style of community

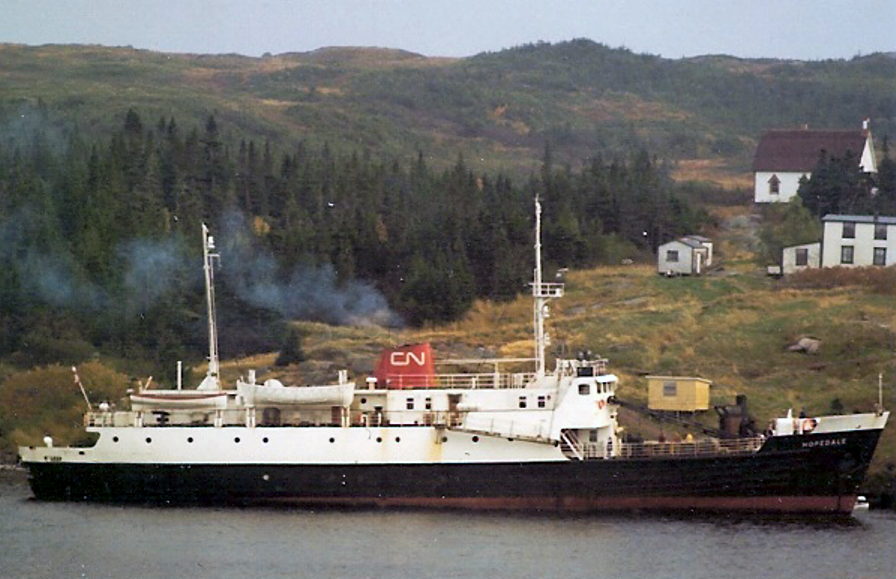
Canadian National ferry Hopedale in the outport community in La Poile, Newfoundland

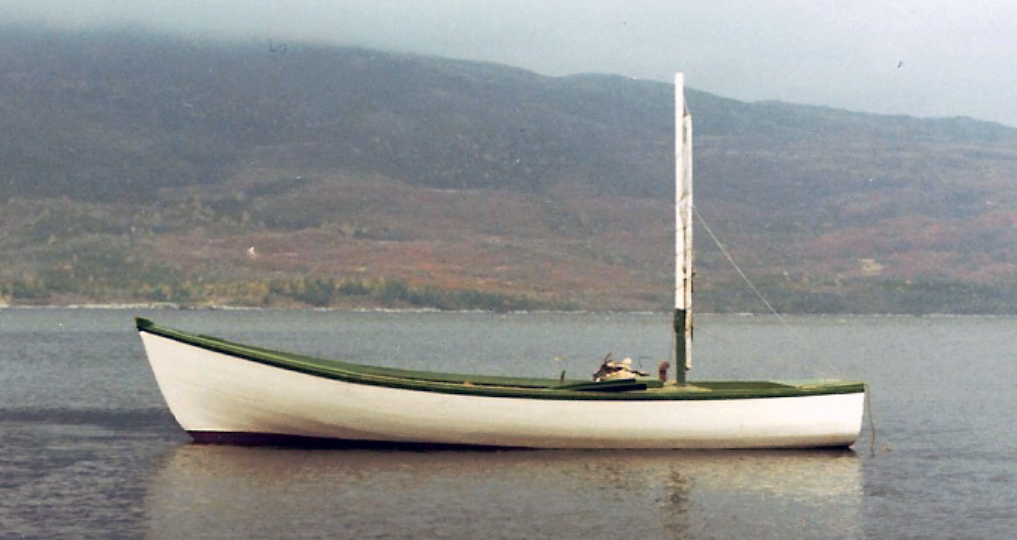
Typical outport transportation in La Poile Bay, Newfoundland

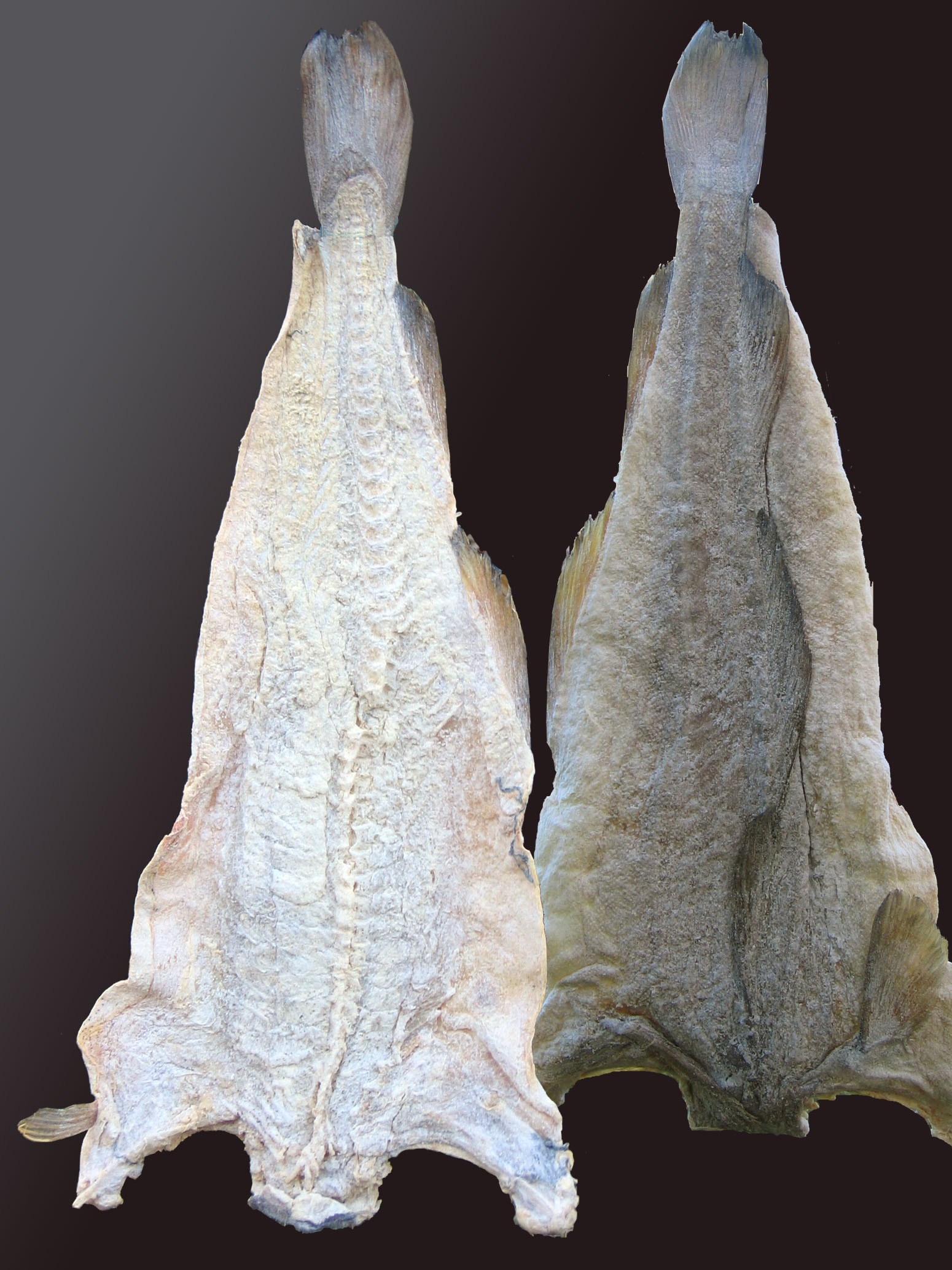
Outports were established for curing fresh fish to dried cod

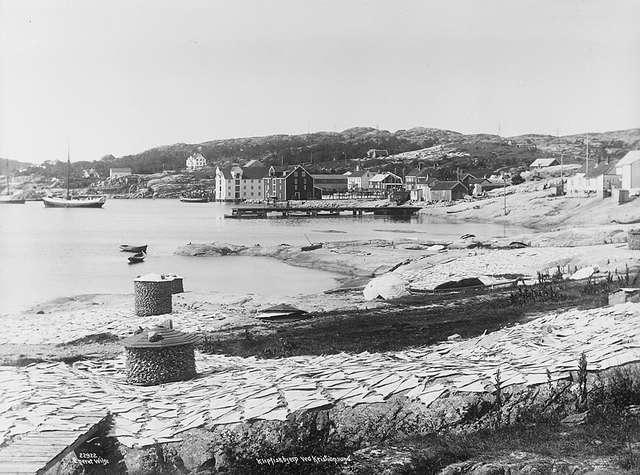
This 1922 photo taken in Kristiansund, Norway, illustrates the fish drying procedure.

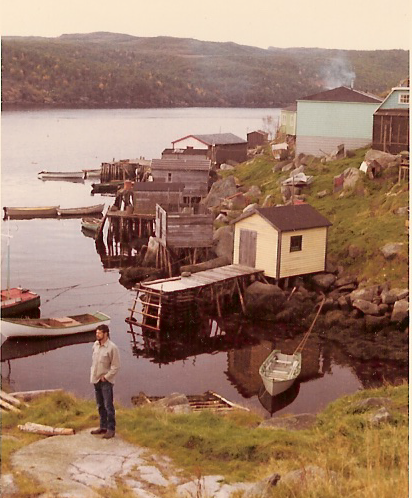
Some Newfoundland outport fishing stages remained in 1971, after fresh fish markets had reduced the need for the drying platforms.

An outport is the term given for a small coastal community in the Canadian province of Newfoundland and Labrador. Originally, the term was used for coastal communities on the island of Newfoundland, but the term has now been adopted for those on the mainland area of Labrador as well.

== History ==
Outports are some of the oldest European settlements in Canada. John Cabot visited Newfoundland in 1497; news spread quickly that Cabot had caught cod by simply lowering and lifting a weighted basket. Gaspar Corte-Real of Portugal visited Newfoundland in 1500, and by 1506 the catch from the Grand Banks of Newfoundland encouraged the King of Portugal to impose a ten percent import tariff to protect local fishermen. The first recorded French fishing boat on the Grand Banks was in 1504, Basque whalers arrived in 1527, and Spanish fishermen followed by 1540.

Many fishing boats, also known as dories, would sail in April or May and return in September. The seasonal fresh catch of "wet" fish were initially returned to Europe to be densely salted and air-dried for preservation until later use, but drying fish in Newfoundland outports allowed each boat to bring back a more valuable cargo of already dried fish from each voyage. The westbound Atlantic crossing carried an expanded crew including a shore party. While the normal crew fished from boats, the shore party felled trees to construct a small wharf or fishing stage and platforms of brush and small boughs upon which the fish would be dried about three feet above the ground. The boats returned to the fishing stage where they threw their catch to be gutted and split by the shore party, who then lightly salted the split fish and arranged them to dry on the platforms. The drying fish were covered with sailcloth every night and during fog or rainy weather, and rearranged periodically for several weeks until they hardened and could be stacked like boards. The dried fish were then stored in sheds until the expanded crew and cargo were loaded for the eastbound Atlantic crossing.

During the fishing and drying season, members of the shore party were able to increase their profits for the voyage by trading with First Nations residents bringing furs to the outport. As Grand Banks fishing increased, the best outport locations might be secured for future use if part of the shore party would volunteer to winter-over in the outport and keep the fishing stage, drying platforms, storage sheds, and small boats in good repair. Surviving a winter in the outport was easier for men who found friendly Mi'kmaq to teach them to find and preserve the local berries to prevent scurvy. Some outport caretakers returned to Europe after wintering over, while others "went native" and remained in Newfoundland Jacques Cartier was offered furs by indigenous residents of Chaleur Bay in 1534, indicating previous experience with European fur traders; and Cartier found members of the Montagnais First Nation engaged in fishing for a French Captain Thiennot. On his return voyage in 1536, Cartier left one of his larger ships' boats at Renewse Harbor, Newfoundland, indicating the outport was already in use as a used boat exchange for fishing vessels needing boats for inshore fishing, but not wanting to transport them across the Atlantic.

Both the First Nations and Europeans considered these outport communities temporary facilities of the fish trade. European populated outports initially depended upon the good will of the local First Nation; and historians often consider the outports as First Nations settlements until well after colonization authorized by European monarchs. The pattern of small isolated settlements was reinforced by actions of the Parliament of England to make permanent settlement of Newfoundland illegal. Seventeenth century English fishermen and fish merchants wished to avoid competition from a local population gaining control of the most productive fishing locations as the New England colonies had done in the Gulf of Maine. The questionable legal status of Newfoundland's clandestine settlements discouraged the type of infrastructure investments found in the Maritime Provinces.

On the island of Newfoundland, residents of the capital city of St. John's are frequently referred to as townies, whereas those not from St. John's are referred to as baymen or bay wops, that is those living beyond Conception Bay. This usage originates from the time before reliable land transportation on the island, when most travel was by boat and settlements were located on the coast.

The railway construction in the 1890s resulted in the creation of inland communities that relied on land-based natural resources. The outports began to see wholesale depopulation following cutbacks to ferry services and construction of roads throughout the island during and after the Second World War. Following Confederation in 1949, the government of premier Joey Smallwood pursued a policy of forced/encouraged resettlement of residents from outports to central inland communities where provision of schools, health care and other government services could be achieved more cheaply.

Farley Mowat was among the critics of the resettlement program who noted that it resulted in what was likened to a "cultural genocide" as rural Newfoundland society became decimated. The cod moratorium of 1992 was another blow to the outport communities, whose entire economies were based on the ocean and its resources. Throughout the 1990s and into the 2000s, outports have voluntarily agreed to depopulate as government required 100% agreement among residents for resettlement, prior to agreeing to close a community. In March 2013, Newfoundland & Labrador Finance Minister Jerome Kennedy announced that households agreeing to resettle from some isolated communities will be given lump-sum payments of up to CAD $270,000.

Only a small proportion of the provincial population remains in outports along the coasts of Newfoundland and Labrador. With no highway access, limited economic growth due to declines in the fishery, and ongoing depopulation as young people move to larger urban centres, the outport is an endangered phenomenon.

A 1969 CBC radio documentary by Canadian pianist Glenn Gould called The Latecomers profiled Newfoundland outports.

== See also ==
- Fishing stage
- History of Newfoundland and Labrador
- Collapse of the Atlantic northwest cod fishery
- Resettlement (Newfoundland)
- Heritage Foundation of Newfoundland and Labrador
- List of communities in Newfoundland and Labrador

== Sources ==
- Morison, Samuel Eliot (1971). The European Discovery of America. New York: Oxford University Press. ISBN 9780195013771.
