= Bonavista North =

Former provincial electoral district in Newfoundland and Labrador, Canada

Newfoundland and Labrador electoral district
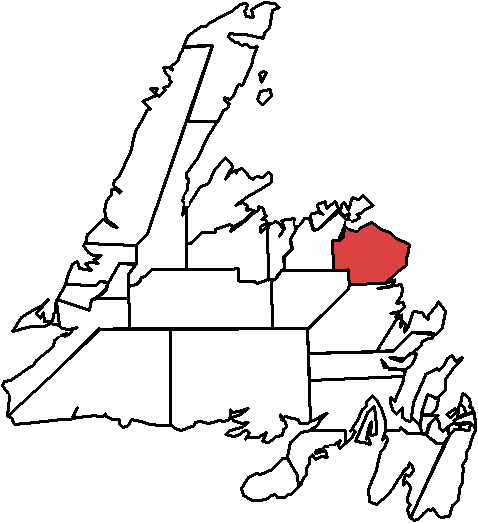
- Bonavista North in relation to other district in Newfoundland

Defunct provincial electoral district
- Legislature: Newfoundland and Labrador House of Assembly
- District created: 1949
- First contested: 1949
- Last contested: 2011

Demographics
- Population (2006): 10,064
- Electors (2011): 6,956

Bonavista North was a provincial electoral district for the House of Assembly of Newfoundland and Labrador, Canada. It existed from when Newfoundland joined confederation in 1949 until 2015.

In 2011 the district had 6,956 eligible voters.

When it was abolished in 2015, it contained the communities of: Trinity, Centreville, Wareham, Indian Bay, Greenspond, Valleyfield, Badger's Quay, Pool's Island, Brookfield, Wesleyville, Pound Cove, Templeman, Newtown, Cape Freels, Lumsden, Deadman's Bay, Musgrave Harbour, Ladle Cove, Aspen Cove, Carmanville, Noggin Cove, Frederickton, Davidsville, Main Point, Gander Bay South, Clarke's Head, Victoria Cove, and Wing's Point.

The district's principal industry was fishing. Former Premier Beaton Tulk represented the district until he resigned in 2002.

The district was abolished in 2015 and replaced almost entirely by Fogo Island-Cape Freels and a small piece going to Gander.

== Members of the House of Assembly ==
The district has elected the following members of the House of Assembly:

Assembly	Years	Member	Party
29th	1949–1951	Joey Smallwood	Liberal
30th	1951–1956	Joey Smallwood	Liberal
31st	1956–1959	Joey Smallwood	Liberal
32nd	1959–1962	Edward S. Spencer	Liberal
33rd	1962–1966	Joey Smallwood	Liberal
34th	1966–1971	Beaton Abbott	Liberal
35th	1971–1972	Paul S. Thoms	Liberal
36th	1972–1975	Paul S. Thoms	Liberal
37th	1975–1979	W. George Cross	Progressive Conservative
38th	1979–1982	Len Stirling	Liberal
39th	1982–1985	W. George Cross	Progressive Conservative
40th	1985–1989	Tom Lush	Liberal
41st	1989–1993	Tom Lush	Liberal
42nd	1993–1996	Tom Lush	Liberal
43rd	1996–1999	Beaton Tulk	Liberal
43rd	1999–2002	Beaton Tulk	Liberal
43rd	2002–2003	Harry Harding	Progressive Conservative
44th	2003–2007	Harry Harding	Progressive Conservative
45th	2007–2011	Harry Harding	Progressive Conservative
46th	2011–2015	Eli Cross	Progressive Conservative

== Election results ==
2011 Newfoundland and Labrador general election
Party	Candidate	Votes	%	±%
Progressive Conservative	Eli Cross	1,723	46.47	-21.29
Liberal	Paul Kean	1,518	40.94	+10.57
New Democratic	John Coaker	467	12.59	+10.71
Total valid votes		3,708	99.54	
Total rejected ballots		17	0.46	-0.42
Turnout		3,725	53.71	-5.49
Electors on the lists		6,935	–	
Progressive Conservative hold		Swing		-15.93

2007 Newfoundland and Labrador general election
Party	Candidate	Votes	%	±%
Progressive Conservative	Harry Harding	2,883	67.76	+9.42
Liberal	Winston Carter	1,292	30.36	-9.30
New Democratic	E. Howard Parsons	80	1.88	-0.12
Total valid votes		4,255	99.02	
Total rejected ballots		42	0.98	+0.79
Turnout		4,297	59.20	-15.21
Electors on the lists		7,258	–	
Progressive Conservative hold		Swing		+9.36

2003 Newfoundland and Labrador general election
Party	Candidate	Votes	%	±%
Progressive Conservative	Harry Harding	3,384	58.33	+1.26
Liberal	Churence Rogers	2,301	39.67	-2.67
New Democratic	E. Howard Parsons	116	2.00	+1.42
Total valid votes		5,801	99.81	
Total rejected ballots		11	0.19	-0.09
Turnout		5,812	74.42	-2.87
Electors on the lists		7,810	–	
Progressive Conservative hold		Swing		+1.97

Newfoundland and Labrador provincial by-election, July 24, 2002 On the resignation of Beaton Tulk
Party	Candidate	Votes	%	±%
Progressive Conservative	Harry Harding	3,424	57.08	+32.61
Liberal	Beaton Tulk	2,540	42.34	-33.20
New Democratic	John L. Whelan	35	0.58	
Total valid votes		5,999	99.72	
Total rejected ballots		17	0.28	-0.38
Turnout		6,016	77.29	+16.27
Electors on the lists		7,784	–	
Progressive Conservative gain from Liberal		Swing		+32.90

1999 Newfoundland general election
Party	Candidate	Votes	%	±%
Liberal	Beaton Tulk	3,943	75.54	+18.85
Progressive Conservative	James Cooze	1,277	24.46	-14.38
Total valid votes		5,220	99.33	
Total rejected ballots		35	0.67	+0.49
Turnout		5,255	61.01	-12.72
Electors on the lists		8,613	–	
Liberal hold		Swing		-16.62

1996 Newfoundland general election
Party	Candidate	Votes	%
Liberal	Beaton Tulk	3,594	56.69
Progressive Conservative	Sam Winsor	2,463	38.85
New Democratic	Wayne Davis	283	4.46
Total valid votes		6,340	99.83
Total rejected ballots		11	0.17
Turnout		6,351	73.74
Electors on the lists		8,613	–

1993 Newfoundland and Labrador general election
Party	Candidate	Votes	%	±%
Liberal	Tom Lush	3722		
Progressive Conservative	John Ackermann	1770	–	–
NDP	Ed Brown	349		

1989 Newfoundland and Labrador general election
Party	Candidate	Votes	%	±%
Liberal	Thomas Lush	3470		
Progressive Conservative	Eli Cross	2351	–	–
NDP	Ingwald Feltham	117		

1985 Newfoundland and Labrador general election
Party	Candidate	Votes	%	±%
Liberal	Tom Lush	2983		
Progressive Conservative	W. George Cross	2861	–	–
NDP	John Blackwood	150		
Independent	Wayne Davis	58		

1982 Newfoundland and Labrador general election
Party	Candidate	Votes	%	±%
Progressive Conservative	Walter George Cross	2972	–	–
Liberal	Len Stirling	2678		

== See also ==
- List of Newfoundland and Labrador provincial electoral districts
- Canadian provincial electoral districts
