= Silver Fox Island =

Island in Newfoundland and Labrador, Canada

Coordinates: 49°01′07″N 53°40′58″W

Located on the northwest side of Bonavista Bay, Newfoundland at the mouth of the Indian Bay inlet is a small island named Silver Fox Island that was once inhabited. It is about 3 km in length and about 3 km from Fair Island. The first settling began at Warren's Harbour on the southern side of the island.

== History ==
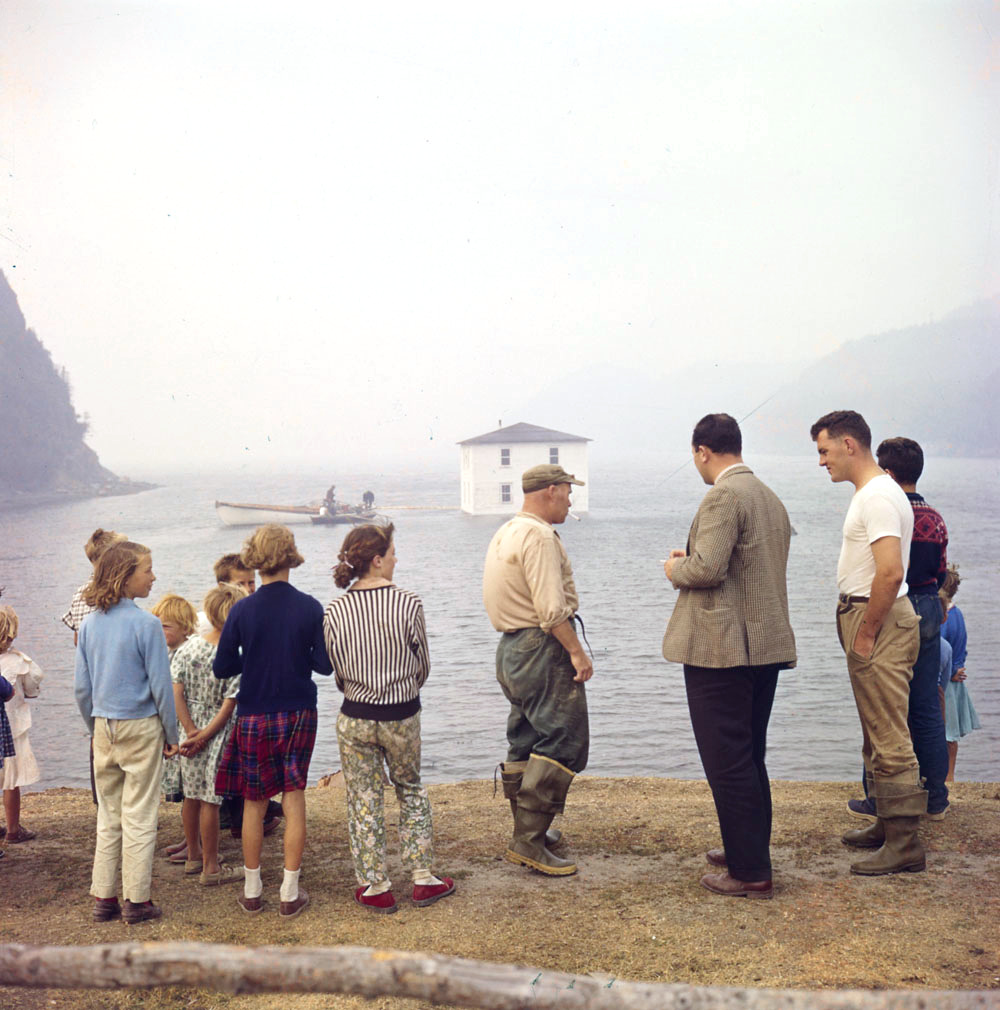
Resettlement of Silver Fox Island in 1961: a house being relocated to Dover.

Warren's Harbour was the first settled, named after an early settler, John Warren, who was living at Salvage, Newfoundland, in 1675. Warren's Harbour appears in the 1836 Census with a population of eight, of the same family. By 1869 there were five families living there, the Buttons, Felthams, Hunts, Matthews', and Rogers' families. In 1884 the population was 49, there was a slow population growth, and in 1901 there were 82 people living there.

Silver Fox Island was not located near any major fishing grounds so they relied heavily on the Labrador fishery and woods work in Indian Bay during the winter.

By the mid-1950s most families were relocating to nearby communities such as Indian Bay and Wareham. By 1969 the island was completely abandoned.

In the 1980s, descendants of Silver Fox Island inhabitants returned to build seasonal "cabins" on the island. At present, approximately two dozen cabins are on the island, and are in use in the spring and summer each year. There are several original buildings left on the island, including a cabin and fishing stage owned by the Matthews family.

== Education History ==
The islands first school-chapel was built between 1895 and 1896. A new school was built in 1926. Some people who taught on the island were James Rogers, Jesse Oakley (of Greenspond), Stephen Hall (of Pinchard's Island), and Beatrice Feltham (of Silver Fox Island)Saul Maher 1956 - 1960(of Greenspond), Arthur Feltham (silver fox Island), .

== Fishery ==
Fishing boats and skippers in Silver Fox Island:

- Silver Steamer
- Silver Jubilee, skippered by Adam Matthews
- Emma, built on the island by John Hann of Wesleyville, 1883.
- Freddy II, skippered by William Wicks of Silver Fox Island
- Polly B, first skippered by William Wicks, then Samuel Matthews, and Samuel Wicks.
- Mildred M. Bill and Margaret K skippered by William Wicks
- Freddy M skippered by Charles Feltham
- Stewart S skippered by David Button
- Green Leaf skippered by Samuel Hunt
- Merry Go built and owned by Joseph Matthews on Silver Fox Island.

Ships skippered by the Feltham family of Silver Fox Island:

- Mayflower

- Grace

- Self

- Foam, 1885

- Paddy

- Beatrice May

- Ada

- Sea Gull

- Ivanhoe

- Henerita Dawton

- Lady Bird

- Mabel

- Clara Hallett

== Census Information ==
	1836	1869	1874
population	8	33	42
inhabited houses	1	5	5
families	1	6	8
Church of England	8	33	42
can read/write	-	9	4
total boats	1	3	1
vessels in seal fishery	-	1	1
men on board	-	7	8
tonnage	-	25	30
nets/seines	-	8	8
people catching/curing fish	-	11	19
seamen/fishermen	-	-	6
fishing rooms in use	-	2	2
cod fish cured (qtls)	-	-	370
salmon (tes)	-	-	2
stores/barns/outhouses	-	2	3
barrels of potatoes produced	-	27	10
oil produced (gals)	-	-	187

== Directory ==
- Lovell's Directory describes it asan island on the north side of Bonavista Bay, distant from Greenspond by 6 miles in boat, with a population of 45 in 1871. The list of names given are:

- Thomas Button, Fisherman
- Samuel Feltham, Planter
- Jacob Hunt, Fisherman
- John Matthews, Fisherman
- William Rogers, Fisherman
- Iain Logan, Quantity Surveyor

== See also ==
- List of communities in Newfoundland and Labrador
