= Newfoundland and Labrador Route 234 =

Highway in Newfoundland and Labrador, Canada

Route 234
- Winter Brook Road

Route information
- Maintained by Newfoundland and Labrador Department of Transportation and Infrastructure
- Length: 17.5 km (10.9 mi)

Major junctions
- West end: Route 230 in Lethbridge
- East end: Winter Brook

Location
- Country: Canada
- Province: Newfoundland and Labrador

Highway system
- Highways in Newfoundland and Labrador
← Route 233	→ Route 235

Route 234, also known as Winter Brook Road, is a 17.5-kilometre-long (10.9 mi) east–west highway on the island of Newfoundland in the province of Newfoundland and Labrador. It is located along the Bonavista Peninsula, connecting Winter Brook with Lethbridge.

== Route description ==
Route 234 begins at an intersection with Route 230 (Bonavista Peninsula Highway/Discovery Trail) in Lethbridge. It has an intersection with a local road that passes through downtown before leaving Lethbridge and heading north. The highway now has two intersections with a loop road passing through Brooklyn before passing northeast along the coastline of Goose Bay to pass through Portland. Route 234 now turns away from the coast as it passes through Jamestown and goes east through wooded areas for a few kilometres before entering Winter Brook and coming to a dead end in a cul-de-sac.

== Major intersections ==
Location	km	mi	Destinations	Notes
Lethbridge	0.0	0.0	Route 230 (Bonavista Peninsula Highway/Discovery Trail) to Route 1 (TCH) – Clarenville, Catalina, Bonavista	Western terminus
Lethbridge	0.8	0.50	Main Road (Route 234-10) - Downtown	
	2.1	1.3	Brooklyn Road - Brooklyn	
	3.7	2.3	Brooklyn Road - Brooklyn	
Winter Brook	17.5	10.9	Dead End	Eastern terminus
1.000 mi = 1.609 km; 1.000 km = 0.621 mi
