= Sam Winsor =

Canadian politician

Sam Winsor MHA

Member of the Newfoundland House of Assembly for Fogo
- In office 20 April 1989 – 3 May 1993
- Preceded by: Beaton Tulk
- Succeeded by: Beaton Tulk

Personal details
- Born: Wesleyville, Newfoundland, Canada
- Party: Progressive Conservative
- Education: Memorial University of Newfoundland
- Profession: Teacher

Sam Winsor is a Canadian politician from Newfoundland and Labrador. He was the member of the House of Assembly (MHA) for Fogo from 1989 to 1993.

== Politics ==
Sam Winsor was born in Wesleyville, Bonavista Bay. After receiving his Bachelor of Arts degree in Education from Memorial University of Newfoundland, he became a teacher in Musgrave Harbour and Carmanville. In 1988, he was elected as the deputy mayor of Carmanville.

Winsor was elected to the House of Assembly as the Progressive Conservative (PC) candidate for the district of Fogo in the 1989 provincial election, where he narrowly defeated Liberal incumbent Beaton Tulk. Winsor's victory was initially challenged by Tulk before the impending court case was dropped. He was defeated for re-election by Tulk in the 1993 election. Winsor attempted once more to re-enter the House of Assembly in 1996 for the district of Bonavista North before losing again to Tulk.

Following his exit from the House of Assembly, Winsor returned to municipal politics, serving as the mayor of Carmanville from 2009 to 2013.

== Electoral history ==
1996 Newfoundland general election: Bonavista North
Party	Candidate	Votes	%	±%
Liberal	Beaton Tulk	3,594	56.69	▼7.03
Progressive Conservative	Sam Winsor	2,463	38.85	▲8.55
Independent	Wayne S. Davis	283	4.46	–
Total valid votes		6,340	99.83	
Total rejected ballots		11	0.17	
Total votes		6,351	73.74	
Eligible voters		8,613		
Liberal hold		Swing		▼7.79

1993 Newfoundland general election: Fogo
Party	Candidate	Votes	%	±%
Liberal	Beaton Tulk	3,295	54.09	▲4.90
Progressive Conservative	Sam Winsor	2,663	43.71	▼7.10
New Democratic	Sam Kelly	134	50.81	–
Total valid votes		6,092	99.74	
Total rejected ballots		16	0.26	
Total votes		6,108	88.24	▲3.39
Eligible voters		6,904		
Liberal gain from Progressive Conservative		Swing		▲6.00

1989 Newfoundland general election: Fogo
Party	Candidate	Votes	%	±%
Progressive Conservative	Sam Winsor	2,966	50.81	▲6.60
Liberal	Beaton Tulk	2,872	49.19	▼4.34
Total valid votes		5,838	99.66	
Total rejected ballots		20	0.34	
Total votes		5,858	84.85	
Eligible voters		6,904		
Progressive Conservative gain from Liberal		Swing		▲5.47
