= Portland, Newfoundland and Labrador =

Settlement in Newfoundland and Labrador

Coordinates: 48.430°N 53.819°W

Location of Portland in Newfoundland and Labrador

Portland is a settlement in Newfoundland and Labrador. It is part of the local service district of Lethbridge and Area.

Portland is located on Route 234, between Brooklyn and Jamestown, on the east side of Goose Bay, Bonavista Bay. Settled in the 1870s, it takes its name from a white rock, visible from the bay, making it look similar to Portland, England. The area was originally used for winter forestry work and for schooner building as well as some lobster fishing and agriculture. Very little fishing and farming is carried out today. A few people still log and own small sawmills.
