= W. George Cross =

Canadian politician (1932–2025)

The Honourable W. George Cross

MHA for Bonavista North
- In office 1975–1979
- Preceded by: Paul S. Thoms
- Succeeded by: Len Stirling
- In office 1982–1985
- Preceded by: Len Stirling
- Succeeded by: Tom Lush

Personal details
- Born: December 9, 1932 Hermit Cove, Bonavista Bay, Dominion of Newfoundland
- Died: October 31, 2025 (aged 92)
- Party: Progressive Conservative Party of Newfoundland and Labrador
- Children: Eli Cross

Walter George Cross (December 9, 1932 – October 31, 2025) was a Canadian politician. He represented the electoral district of Bonavista North in the Newfoundland and Labrador House of Assembly from 1975 to 1979 and 1982 to 1985. He was a member of the Progressive Conservative Party of Newfoundland and Labrador.

== Life and career ==
The son of Ernest Cross and Sophie Pelley, he was born in Hermit Cove, Newfoundland and was educated in Badger's Quay and at Memorial University. In 1956, he married Joan Christine Fowlow.

He was elected to the Newfoundland assembly in 1975; the results of the election were declared invalid but Cross won the by-election which followed. He was defeated by Liberal Len Stirling in the 1979 general election. Cross was elected again in 1982 but was defeated when he ran for reelection in 1985.

His son Eli Cross later represented Bonavista North in the assembly.

Cross died on October 31, 2025, at the age of 92.
