= Newfoundland and Labrador Route 233 =

Highway in Newfoundland and Labrador, Canada

Route 233
- Clode Sound Road

Route information
- Maintained by Newfoundland and Labrador Department of Transportation and Infrastructure
- Length: 32.1 km (19.9 mi)

Major junctions
- West end: Route 1 (TCH) in Port Blandford
- East end: Route 230 in Lethbridge

Location
- Country: Canada
- Province: Newfoundland and Labrador

Highway system
- Highways in Newfoundland and Labrador
| ← Route 232 | → Route 234 |

Route 233, also known as Clode Sound Road, is a 32.1-kilometre-long (19.9 mi) east–west highway on the island of Newfoundland in the province of Newfoundland and Labrador. It connects the communities along the southern shores of Clode Sound and Goose Bay with Route 1 (Trans-Canada Highway) and Route 230 (Bonavista Peninsula Highway/Discovery Trail).

== Route description ==
Route 233 begins in Port Blandford at an intersection with Route 1. It heads east through town to cross a Causeway and pass through neighbourhoods before leaving town and heading northeast through wooded along the southern shore of Clode Sound. The highway now passes through Bunyan's Cove and begins pulling away from Clode Sound and heads inland to pass through Bloomfield, where it has intersections with two local spur roads leading to Musgravetown and Canning's Cove. Route 233 now traverses the southern shore of Goose Bay to enter Lethbridge at an intersection with a local road that passes through downtown. The highway passes through some industrial areas and neighbourhoods before coming to an end at an intersection with Route 230.

== Major intersections ==
| Location | km | mi | Destinations | Notes |
|---|---|---|---|---|
| Port Blandford | 0.0 | 0.0 | Route 1 (TCH) – Clarenville, Gander, Grand Falls-Windsor | Western terminus |
| Port Blandford | 1.2 | 0.75 | Main Street (Route 233-13) - Downtown | |
| Bloomfield | 24.3 | 15.1 | To Goose Bay Drive - Musgravetown | |
| Bloomfield | 24.8 | 15.4 | Goose Bay Drive (Route 233-10) - Musgravetown, Canning's Cove | |
| Lethbridge | 30.1 | 18.7 | Main Road (Route 234-10) - Downtown | |
| Lethbridge | 32.1 | 19.9 | Route 230 (Bonavista Peninsula Highway/Discovery Trail) to Route 1 (TCH) – Clarenville, Catalina, Bonavista | Eastern terminus |
1.000 mi = 1.609 km; 1.000 km = 0.621 mi
