= North West Arm, Newfoundland =

Coordinates: 49°08′02″N 53°37′28″W

North West Arm was a community near Valleyfield in Bonavista Bay, Newfoundland. It was located on the southwest side of a long indraft of the same name and was settled about 1880, but was abandoned by 1960. North West Arm first appeared in the 1891 census with a population of 77. In the 1935 census, this had increased to 143 people, and by 1945 it had climbed further to 153, before reaching a peak of 160 in 1951. The area once occupied by North West Arm is now within the boundaries of the town of New-Wes-Valley.

== See also ==
- List of communities in Newfoundland and Labrador
- Bonavista Bay
