= 44th General Assembly of Newfoundland and Labrador =

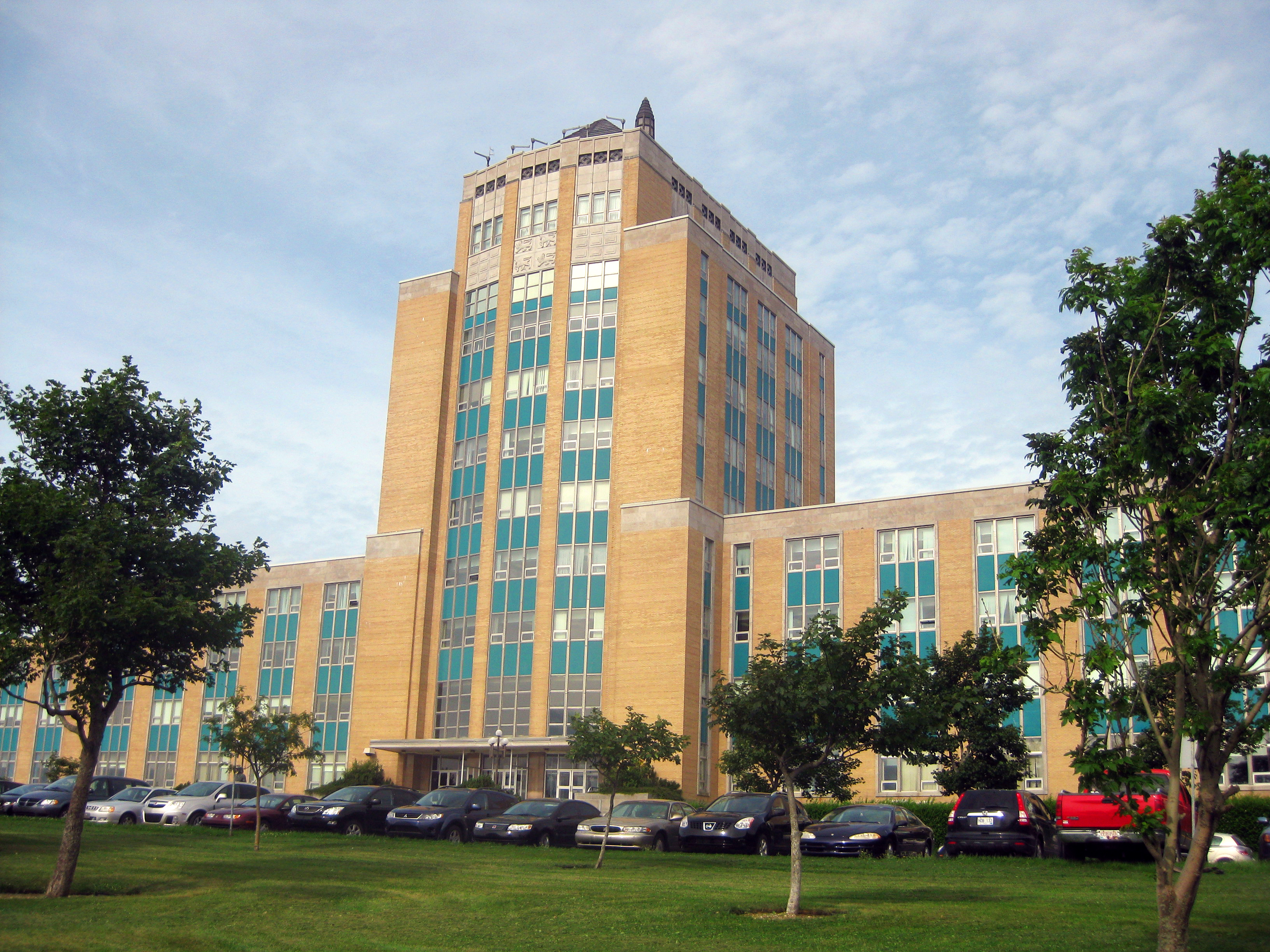
- Confederation Building East Block. Seat of the Newfoundland and Labrador government and the House of Assembly from 1960 to present.

History
- Founded: 1999
- Disbanded: 2003
- Preceded by: 43rd General Assembly of Newfoundland
- Succeeded by: 45th General Assembly of Newfoundland and Labrador

Leadership
- Premier: Brian Tobin (Until October 2000)
- Premier: Beaton Tulk (Until February 2001)
- Premier: Roger Grimes

Elections
- Last election: 1999 Newfoundland general election

The members of the 44th General Assembly of Newfoundland and Labrador were elected in the Newfoundland general election held in February 1999. The general assembly sat from 1999 to 2003.

The Liberal Party led by Brian Tobin formed the government. After Tobin reentered federal politics in October 2000, Beaton Tulk became interim party leader and Premier. Roger Grimes was elected party leader in February 2001.

Lloyd Snow served as speaker.

Arthur Maxwell House served as lieutenant governor of Newfoundland and Labrador until 2002. Edward Roberts succeeded House as lieutenant-governor.

== Members of the Assembly ==
The following members were elected to the assembly in 1999:

Member	Electoral district	Party	First elected / previously elected
Paul Shelley	Baie Verte	Progressive Conservative	1993
Eddie Joyce	Bay of Islands	Liberal	1989, 1999
Percy Barrett	Bellevue	Liberal	1989
Beaton Tulk	Bonavista North	Liberal	1979, (Note: Fogo) 1993
Harry Harding (2002)	Bonavista North	Progressive Conservative	2002
Roger Fitzgerald	Bonavista South	Progressive Conservative	1993
Kelvin Parsons	Burgeo-La Poile	Liberal	1999
Mary Hodder	Burin-Placentia West	Liberal	1996
Jack Byrne	Cape St. Francis	Progressive Conservative	1993
George Sweeney	Carbonear-Harbour Grace	Liberal	1999
Yvonne Jones	Cartwright-L'Anse au Clair	Liberal	1996
Jim Walsh	Conception Bay East – Bell Island	Liberal	1989
Bob French	Conception Bay South	Progressive Conservative	1996
Terry French (2002)	Conception Bay South	Progressive Conservative	2002
Roger Grimes	Exploits	Liberal	1989
Loyola Sullivan	Ferryland	Progressive Conservative	1992
Oliver Langdon	Fortune Bay-Cape La Hune	Liberal	1989 (Note: First Elected as a Progressive Conservative)
Sandra C. Kelly	Gander	Liberal	1996
Judy Foote	Grand Bank	Liberal	1996
Anna Thistle	Grand Falls-Buchans	Liberal	1996
Tom Hedderson	Harbour Main-Whitbourne	Progressive Conservative	1999
Bob Mercer	Humber East	Liberal	1996
Rick Woodford	Humber Valley	Liberal	1985
Paul Dicks	Humber West	Liberal	1989
Danny Williams (2001)	Humber West	Progressive Conservative	2001
Edward J. Byrne	Kilbride	Progressive Conservative	1993
Randy Collins	Labrador West	New Democrat	1999
Ernie McLean	Lake Melville	Liberal	1996
Tom Rideout	Lewisporte	Progressive Conservative	1975, (Note: Baie Verte-Springdale (First Elected as a Liberal)) 1999
Julie Bettney	Mount Pearl	Liberal	1996
Fabian Manning	Placentia	Progressive Conservative	1993, 1999
Gerald Smith	Port au Port	Liberal	1993
John Efford	Port de Grave	Liberal	1985
Roland Butler (2001)	Port de Grave	Liberal	2001
Chuck Furey	St. Barbe	Liberal	1985
Wallace Young (2001)	St. Barbe	Progressive Conservative	2001
Kevin Aylward	St. George's-Stephenville East	Liberal	1985
Joan Marie Aylward	St. John's Centre	Liberal	1996
John Ottenheimer	St. John's East	Progressive Conservative	1996
Lloyd Matthews	St. John's North	Liberal	1993
Tom Osborne	St. John's South	Progressive Conservative	1996
Sheila Osborne	St. John's West	Progressive Conservative	1997
Jack Harris	Signal Hill-Quidi Vidi	New Democrat	1990
Tom Lush	Terra Nova	Liberal	1975, 1985, (Note: Bonavista North) 1989
Brian Tobin	The Straits – White Bay North	Liberal	1996
Trevor Taylor (2001)	The Straits – White Bay North	Progressive Conservative	2001
Ralph Wiseman	Topsail	Liberal	1996
Wally Andersen	Torngat Mountains	Liberal	1996
LLoyd George Snow	Trinity-Bay de Verde	Liberal	1989
Doug Oldford	Trinity North	Liberal	1991
Ross Wiseman (2000)	Trinity North	Liberal	2000
Ross Wiseman (2000)	Trinity North	Progressive Conservative	2000
Gerry Reid	Twillingate & Fogo	Liberal	1996
Walter Noel	Virginia Waters	Liberal	1996
Harvey Hodder	Waterford Valley	Progressive Conservative	1993
Ray Hunter	Windsor-Springdale	Progressive Conservative	1999

== By-elections ==
By-elections were held to replace members for various reasons:

Electoral district	Member elected	Affiliation	Election date	Reason
Trinity North	Ross Wiseman	Liberal	April 25, 2000	D Oldford resigned seat on March 28, 2000
St. Barbe	Wallace Young	Progressive Conservative	January 30, 2001	C Furey resigned seat on October 28, 2000 to run for a federal seat
The Straits – White Bay North	Trevor Taylor	Progressive Conservative	January 30, 2001	B Tobin resigned seat on October 16, 2000 to run for a federal seat
Humber West	Danny Williams	Progressive Conservative	June 19, 2001	P Dicks resigned seat on April 9, 2001 to run for a federal seat
Port de Grave	Roland Butler	Liberal	June 19, 2001	J Efford resigned seat on March 28, 2001
Bonavista North	Harry Harding	Progressive Conservative	July 24, 2002	B Tulk resigned seat on April 2, 2002 to run unsuccessfully for a federal seat
Conception Bay South	Terry French	Progressive Conservative	November 12, 2002	B French died on August 2, 2002
