= Paul Thoms =

Canadian land surveyor and politician

Reverend Paul Thoms

Member of Parliament for Bonavista North
- In office June 1971 – February 1975
- Preceded by: Beaton Abbott
- Succeeded by: W. George Cross

Personal details
- Born: Paul Slade Thoms; 19 February 1932 Garnish, Newfoundland
- Died: 4 July 2012 (aged 80) St. John's
- Party: Liberal
- Profession: land surveyor, farmer, politician, minister

Military service
- Allegiance: Canada
- Years of service: 1950 - 1955
- Unit: Royal Canadian Air Force

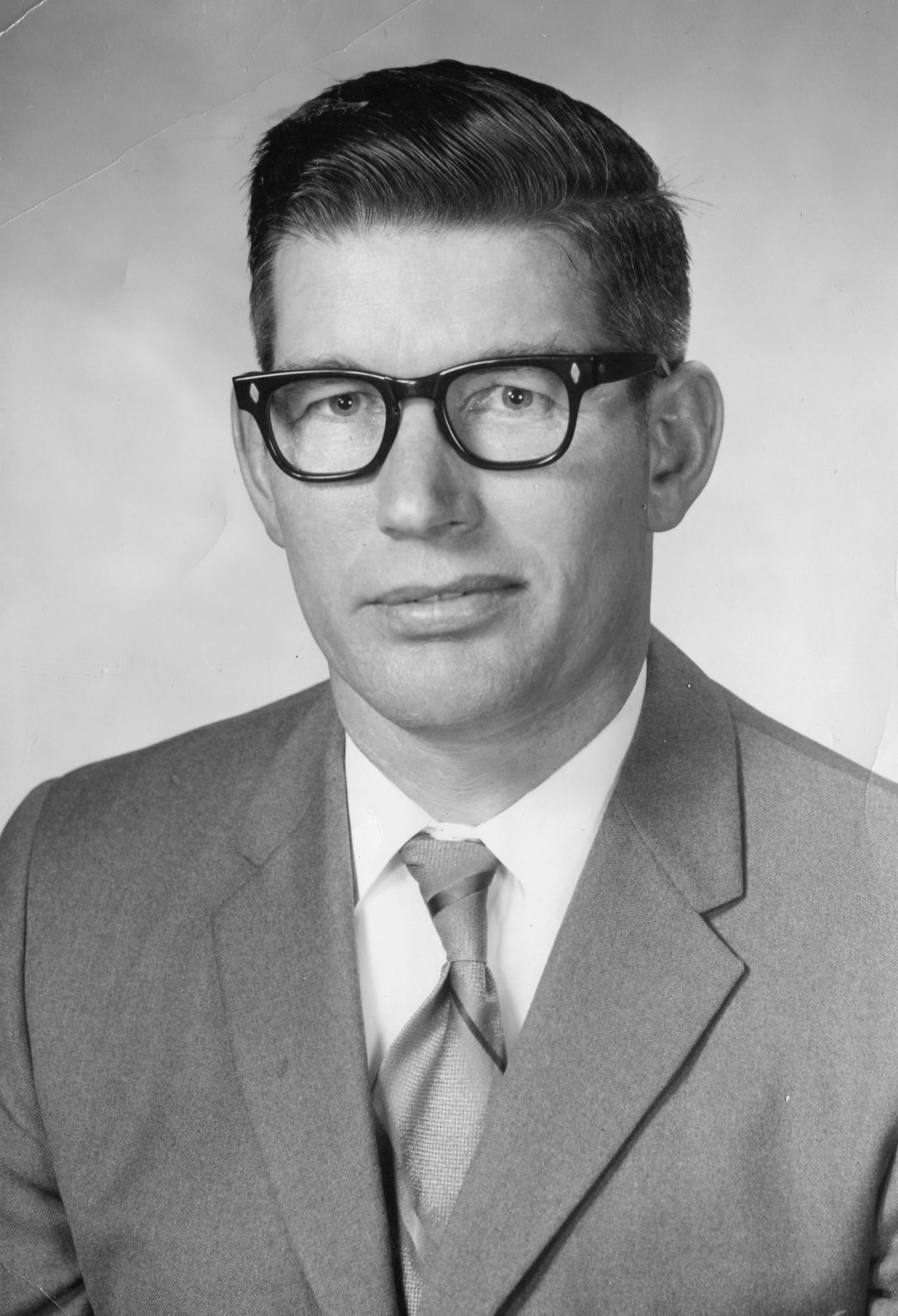
This photo was taken during Paul Thoms’s political career.

Paul Slade Thoms (February 19, 1932 – July 4, 2012) was a land surveyor and politician in Newfoundland. He represented Bonavista North from 1971 to 1975 in the Newfoundland House of Assembly.

The son of James Ernest Thoms (a teacher and principal) and Gertrude Helen Bridger (a midwife who also worked with Dr. Grenfell), he was born in Garnish and was educated in Middle Brook. Thoms had seven siblings including Leslie Thoms, who was also part of the House of Assembly. Thoms married Elsie Barrow. He served in the Royal Canadian Air Force from 1949 to 1954. Thoms was president of the Gambo Red Cross. From 1967 to 1972, he owned and operated a farm in partnership with his brother Jim who, later worked as an NTV news reporter.

Thoms was ordained an Anglican deacon in 1991 and became a priest in 1992. He was also a member of the Orange Order in Newfoundland.
