= Rex Yetman =

- Born: 1933; Jamestown, Newfoundland, Canada
- Died: December 18, 2009 (aged 75–76)
- Genres: Bluegrass
- Occupation: Musician
- Instrument: Mandolin
- Formerly of: York County Boys

Rex Yetman (1933 – December 18, 2009) hailed from Jamestown, Newfoundland, Canada.

He was one of the founding members in 1953 of the York County Boys, Canada's first bluegrass band, who played around Ontario and eastern Canada through the 1960s and early 1970s. They recorded "You Done Me Wrong" and "Down The Road Blues". Yetman played mandolin and sang on the album, Bluegrass Jamboree with the York County Boys, which was the first bluegrass album released in Canada. The York County Boys appeared on the Tommy Hunter Show and Country Music Hall.

He most recently played with Crooked Stovepipe of St. John's, who were awarded the East Coast Music Association's bluegrass album of the year in 2006.

Yetman died in December 2009, at the age of 76.
