= Eli Cross (politician) =

Canadian politician

Member of the Newfoundland and Labrador House of Assembly for Bonavista North
- In office October 27, 2011 – November 5, 2015
- Preceded by: Harry Harding
- Succeeded by: District Abolished

Personal details
- Born: October 14, 1957 (age 68) Come By Chance, Newfoundland and Labrador
- Party: Progressive Conservative

Eli Cross is a Canadian politician in Newfoundland and Labrador, Canada. He was elected to the Newfoundland and Labrador House of Assembly in the 2011 provincial election. A member of the Progressive Conservative Party of Newfoundland and Labrador, he represented the electoral district of Bonavista North. In the 2015 election, Cross was defeated by Liberal Derrick Bragg in the new Fogo Island-Cape Freels riding.

Prior to his election to the legislature, Cross served as mayor of Wesleyville, and subsequently as mayor of the amalgamated town of New-Wes-Valley.

== Electoral record ==
2015 Newfoundland and Labrador general election
Party	Candidate	Votes	%	±%
Liberal	Derrick Bragg	3,516	69.9	–
Progressive Conservative	Eli Cross	1,387	27.6	–
New Democratic	Rebecca Stuckey	128	2.5	–

2011 Newfoundland and Labrador general election
Party	Candidate	Votes	%	±%
Progressive Conservative	Eli Cross	1,723	46.47	–
Liberal	Paul Kean	1,518	40.94	
NDP	John Coaker	467	12.59	

1989 Newfoundland and Labrador general election
Party	Candidate	Votes	%	±%
Liberal	Thomas Lush	3470		
Progressive Conservative	Eli Cross	2351	–	–
NDP	Ingwald Feltham	117		
