= Fair Island, Newfoundland and Labrador =

Human settlement in Newfoundland and Labrador, Canada

Coordinates: 48.983°N 53.700°W

Location of Fair Island in Newfoundland

Fair Island, also called Vere Island, is a former community on the northeast coast of the island of Newfoundland. Together with other nearby communities it comprises an area called Bonavista North. These communities have a shared history in that they were settled by people from England, predominantly from the West Country - Dorset, Devon Somerset and Hampshire.

== Geography ==
On the northeast coast of Newfoundland in Bonavista Bay, just east of Centreville, lie a group of islands close to the shore line called Fair Islands. The dome-shaped islands are separated by a narrow channel called the Fair Island Tickle. Fair Islands was once a popular settlement because its harbours were excellent for schooners, it was near the seal migration routes, and it was a good fishing base because of its offshore location and ample fresh water. However, Fair Island was vacated by the 1960s.

== History ==
Fair Islands, originally called Vere Island, was one of the earliest fishing bases in Bonavista Bay. In the summer of 1681, there was a population of 16 recorded there and they were fishing from three boats. Beginning in the early 19th century, there was an increase in English settlement, and by 1806 there were two fishing rooms built in Fair Island by English men. The earliest settlers came from Devon, Cornwall, and Liverpool, England. It is believed that Richard Rogers from Sheffield, England settled in Fair Island around 1800 and other families soon followed. Families that moved there between 1800 and 1840 were: Ackerman, Gibbons, Pond, Way, Wicks, and later came Harlock, Farmage, Oakley and Boland.

The population doubled between 1836 and 1869, from 105 to 212 settlers and they turned more towards the Labrador fishery as the inshore fishery could no longer sustain the growing population. Sealing activity was first recorded in 1857, the Labrador cod fishery was still growing, and smaller quantities of salmon, herring, and capelin were also being caught. By 1891, there was also a lobster factory recorded which employed 31 men.

The economy was based on the Labrador fishery until its decline in 1930s and 1940s. By 1952, there were only eight families engaged in fishing for cod, lobster, and turbot. In the winter, men were employed with woods work, but by the 1950s most families were being resettled elsewhere. Fair Islands were vacated by the 1960s.

== Church History ==
On September 7, 1846 Bishop Edward Feild, sailed to Fair Island and consecrated St. Barnabas Church. He was the first bishop to visit since Bishop Inglis' visit in the 1830s.

== Education History ==
A school was first reported in 1836, established by the Newfoundland School Society. The first teacher was Moses Cutler and the initial enrolment was 28 students.

== Census Information ==
| | 1836 | 1869 | 1857 | 1874 |
|---|---|---|---|---|
| Population | 105 | 212 | 184 | 209 |
| Inhabited houses | 12 | 23 | 17 | 33 |
| Families | - | 36 | 28 | 38 |
| Church of England | 104 | 212 | 184 | 209 |
| Roman Catholic | 1 | - | - | - |
| # of pupils | - | 33 | - | 9 |
| Can read/write | - | 56 | - | 107 |
| Total fishing boats | 11 | 15 | 14 | 12 |
| Boats built | - | - | 2 | - |
| People catching/curing fish | - | 72 | 144 | 98 |
| Seamen/fishermen | - | - | 41 | 33 |
| Vessels in seal fishery | - | 2 | 1 | 3 |
| Men on board | - | 22 | 6 | 23 |
| Tonnage | - | 53 | 30 | 76 |
| Nets and seines | - | 32 | 70 | 8 |
| Seal nets | - | - | 30 | 10 |
| Seals caught | - | - | 16 | - |
| Cod fish cured (qtls) | - | - | 1440 | 1730 |
| Salmon caught and cured (tres) | - | - | 5 | 7 |
| Fishing rooms in use | - | 13 | 10 | 10 |
| Stores/barns/outhouses | - | 11 | 9 | 11 |
| Oil produced (tuns) | - | - | 4.5 | 660 gals |
| Barrels of potatoes produced | 416.5 (bushels) | 174 | 135 | 50 |
| Barrels of turnip | - | 5 | - | - |
| Cattle/cows/oxen | 2 | - | 10 | - |
| Hogs | 3 | - | - | - |
| Swine/goats | - | 1 | 7 | 35 |

== Directories ==
- Hutchinson's Directory of 1864 lists one person under Fair Island:

- William Pickett, Sr. - Planter

- Lovell's Directory describes Fair Island as an island on the west side of Bonavista Bay, distant from Greenspond by 9 miles by boat with a population of 212. The names that are listed are:

- Ackerman, Stephen - Fisherman
- Ansty, John - Planter
- Bollen, Isaac - Fisherman
- Brown, James - Fisherman
- Cutler, John - Planter
- Farmage, Samuel - Fisherman
- Gibbons, John - Fisherman
- Harlock, Thomas - Fisherman
- Hounsell, George - Fisherman
- Hunt, Anthony - Fisherman
- Hunt, Robert - Fisherman
- Noble, William - Fisherman
- Oakley, Charles
- Picket, John - Fisherman
- Picket, Jonah - Fisherman
- Picket, William - Planter
- Pond, Edward - Fisherman
- Rogers, Charles - Fisherman
- Rogers, John - Fisherman
- Rogers, John, jun - Planter
- Way, John - Fisherman
- Wieks, Benjamin - Fisherman

== Interesting facts ==
- Native Newfoundland actor, Andre Noble, 25, died on the island on July 30, 2004, from accidental monkshood poisoning.
- The members of the outport road board for Fair Island were Brown, Hunt, Rodgers, and Filthorn.
- Two fishing rooms in Fair Island were recorded in 1805: Pickett's Room and Lane's Room.

== See also ==
- List of ghost towns in Newfoundland and Labrador
