= Lethbridge and Area =

Lethbridge and Area Lethbridge to Sweet Bay
- Local service district
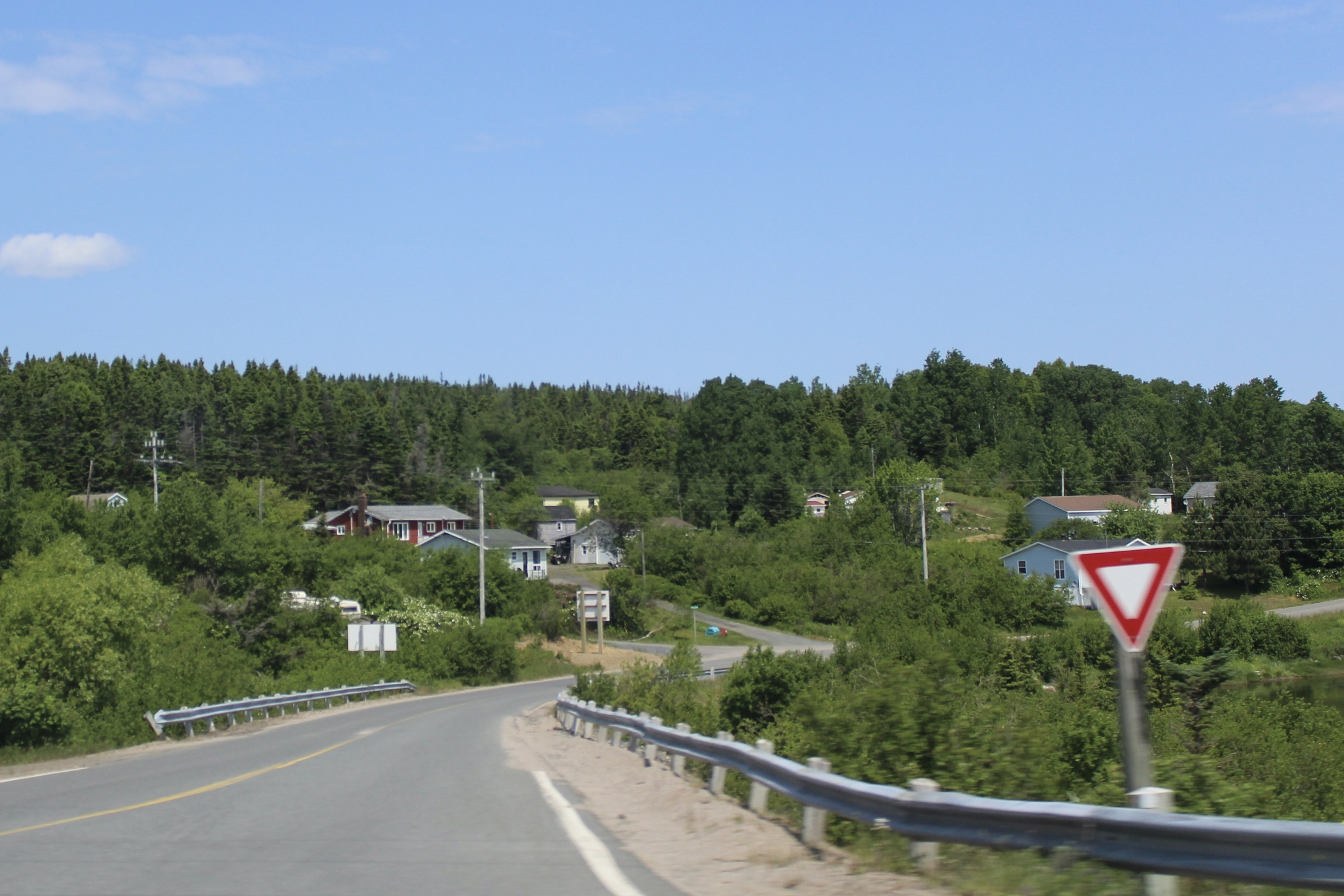
- Driving through Charleston

- Location of Lethbridge to Sweet Bay Lethbridge and Area (Canada)
- Coordinates: 48.358°N 53.758°W
- Country: Canada
- Province: Newfoundland and Labrador
- Region: Newfoundland
- Census division: 7
- Census subdivisions: E and F

Government
  - Type: Unincorporated
- Time zone: UTC−03:30 (NST)
  - Summer (DST): UTC−02:30 (NDT)
- Area code: 709
- Website: Official website

Lethbridge, Morley's Siding, Brooklyn, Charleston, Jamestown, Portland, Winter Brook and Sweet Bay, commonly shortened as Lethbridge and Area, is a local service district (LSD) in the Canadian province of Newfoundland and Labrador.

== Name ==
The legal name of the LSD is "Lethbridge, Morley's Siding, Brooklyn, Charleston, Jamestown, Portland, Winter Brook and Sweet Bay". The LSD is however known as "Lethbridge and Area" in common usage and is also referred to as such on the LSD's official website and in its communication.

Alternatively, the LSD is also known as "Lethbridge to Sweet Bay".

== History ==
The Lethbridge and Area LSD was established in 2010.

== Geography ==
Lethbridge and Area is in Newfoundland within Subdivision E and Subdivision F of Division No. 7. The Lethbridge to Sweet Bay LSD includes the communities of Brooklyn, Charleston, Jamestown, Lethbridge, Morley's Siding, Portland, Sweet Bay, and Winter Brook.

== Government ==
Lethbridge and Area is an LSD that is governed by a committee responsible for the provision of certain services to the community. The chair of the LSD committee is Kevin Pennie.

== See also ==
- List of communities in Newfoundland and Labrador
- List of local service districts in Newfoundland and Labrador
