= Pool's Island =

Neighbourhood in New-Wes-Valley, Newfoundland and Labrador, Canada

Coordinates: 49°06′44″N 53°35′03″W

Pool's Island is an unincorporated community of Badger's Quay-Valleyfield-Pool's Island in the province of Newfoundland and Labrador, Canada. It is now part of the town of New-Wes-Valley.

== History ==
Pool's Island was named Fool's Island up until the 1850s. It was visited in the late 18th century by migratory fishermen but permanent settlement did not begin until about 1800 by seal fishermen and inshore cod fishermen. The first known resident was Anne Jeans, recorded in 1815. By 1821, a sealing captain from Greenspond, William Kean, was living on Pool's Island, and in 1823, a Jacob Preston was there. Other family names that came to Pool's Island were Kean, Ayles, Pope, Dalton, and Davis; many of these settlers came from Flowers Island. There was a rapid increase in population between 1845 and 1869 when the population grew from 177 to 524, mainly because of the Labrador seal hunt and Pool's Island was in the path of the harp seal migration route. The growth of Pool's Island eventually led to the growth of communities surrounding it, such as Valleyfield and Badger's Quay.

=== Church history ===
In 1836, nine people out of the 112 on Pool's Island were Roman Catholic, the rest were Church of England. By 1845 there was a Roman Catholic school and church on the island. There was no resident minister in Pool's Island so Missionaries from other communities would visit Pool's Island for services, baptisms, burials, and marriages. In 1865 the St. James Anglican Church was built on Pool's Island and was consecrated on September 24, 1865 by Bishop Edward Feild.

=== Education ===
As early as 1830 children were being educated on Pool's Island, a building on the island was used as a school until the first school was built in 1862. In 1841 there were 30 students under John Spurrell, and in 1848 there were 48 students. The next teacher was William Murch from England who taught from 1858 to 1873. A new school room was built on Pool's Island in 1883. In 1895 C.W. Prowse wrote in his history of Newfoundland that the branch school at Pool's Island was established in 1829 and was being run by a branch teacher with 20 pupils in day school and 27 in Sunday school.

=== Seal fishery ===
The seal fishery played an enormous role in the permanent settlement and growth of Pool's Island. Because of its prime location for the seal fishery many captains and steamers operated out of Pool's Island. Chafe's Sealing Book lists several steamers from Pool's Island that were a part of the St. John's steam sealing fleet from 1863 to 1894. These ships, their master, and the supplier are as follows:

Steamer	Master	Supplier
Wolf	William Kean	Walter Grieve & Co.
Greenland	B. Kean	Nicholas Stabb
Kite	W. Knee	Bowring Brothers
MicMac	S. Bartlett	Baine Johston & Co.
Nimrod	B. Crocker	Job Brothers & Co.
Wolf II 2nd	A. Kean	Newfoundland S.S. & W.F. Co.

Chafe's book also lists a ship that sailed from Pool's Island that was a part of the Harbour Grace steam sealing fleet and that was the Mastiff mastered by Isaac Mercer, and supplied by John Munn & Co.

Naboth Winsor's Stalwart Men and Sturdy Ships provides ample detail about the seal fishery in Bonavista Bay North, which includes Pool's Island. In one of Winsor's charts, Pool's Island is listed as having 38 seal nets in 1845, 57 in 1857, and 18 in 1869. Also, in 1857 Pool's Island had 9 large boats suitable for the seal fishery.

=== Census information ===
	1836	1845	1857	1869	1874
population	112	177	311	524	506
inhabited houses	13	16	30	66	67
families	-	-	51	83	80
Church of England	103	162	306	476	442
Roman Catholic	9	15	-	-	-
Wesleyan/Methodists	-	-	5	48	64
can read/write	-	-	-	169	206
# of students	-	39	-	39	37
merchants/traders	-	-	1	1	-
people catching/curing fish	-	-	240	147	256
seamen/fishermen	-	-	78	?	85
total fishing boats	12	14	32	8	23
boats built	-	-	2	-	-
nets/seines	-	45	48	66	195
cod fish cured (qtls)	-	-	5010	-	6606
herring cured (Bls)	-	-	150	-	-
vessels in seal fishery	-	-	6	18	14
men on board	-	-	119	131	216
tonnage in fishery	-	-	352	716	672
seals caught	-	-	8725	-	-
seal nets	-	38	57	18	
fishing rooms in use	-	-	23	22	30
stores/barns/outhouses	-	-	28	23	41
Oil (tuns)	-	-	16 1/4	-	3884
tons of hay	-	4	2	-	-
barrels potatoes produced	766.5	260	406	1172	2048
barrels of turnip	-	-	49	47	45
hogs	6	-	-	-	-
cows	-	-	3	-	-
sheep	-	-	2	7	15
swine/goats	-	-	19	61	167

=== Directories ===
- Hutchinson's Directory for 1864-65 lists some residents of Pool's Island:

- George Dyke, Planter and Shipowner
- Samuel Dyke, Planter and Shipowner
- William Keane, Planter and Shipowner
- John Knee, Sr., Planter
- Phillip Knee, Planter and Shipowner
- John Spurrell, Planter and Shipowner

- Lovell's Directory for 1871 describes Pool's Island as an island on the north side of Bonavista Bay with a good harbour, distant from Greenspond 3 miles by boat with a population of 524. The names listed are:

- Abbot, John - Fisherman
- Abbot, Stephen - Fisherman
- Atwood, Thomas - Planter
- Ayles, Charles - Fisherman
- Barefoot, George - Fisherman
- Barefoot, William - Fisherman
- Brown, Robert - Fisherman
- Brown, Samuel - Fisherman
- Brown, Thomas - Planter
- Brown, William - Fisherman
- Dalton, John - Fisherman
- Dalton, William - Fisherman
- Davis, Isaac - Fisherman
- Davis, Job - Planter
- Dick, Samuel - Fisherman
- Dick, Edward - Fisherman
- Dick, George - Planter
- Feltham, William - Fisherman
- Gillingham, Thomas - Fisherman
- Hallett, Reuben - Fisherman
- Hallett, William - Fisherman
- Haskins, George - Fisherman
- Helleway, Charles - Planter
- House, Peter - Merchant
- Howell, Henry - Fisherman
- Howell, James - Fisherman
- James, James - Planter
- Jeans, George - Fisherman
- Jeans, Henry - Fisherman
- Jeans, Robert - Planter
- Jeans, Thomas - Fisherman
- Jeans, William - Fisherman
- Kents, Job - Fisherman
- Keane, Benjamin - Fisherman
- Keane, William - Merchant
- King, George - Planter
- Knee, Benjamin - Fisherman
- Knee, George - Planter
- Knee, James - Fisherman
- Knee, John, jr - Fisherman
- Knee, John, sr - Planter
- Knee, Peter - Fisherman
- Knee, Philip - Fisherman
- Knee, Philip, sr - Fisherman
- Knee, William - Planter
- Parsons, William - Fisherman
- Pope, John - Fisherman
- Preston, Jacob - Fisherman
- Rodgers, James - Fisherman
- Scott, William - Planter
- Sheppard, James - Fisherman
- Sheppard, John - Fisherman
- Sheppard, William - Fisherman
- Spurrell, John - Fisherman
- Spurrell, Robert - Planter
- Spurrell, Samuel - Fisherman
- Spurrell, William - Planter
- Stoke, Francis - Fisherman
- White, George - Fisherman
- Winter, David - Fisherman
- Winter, James, jr. - Fisherman
- Winter, James, sr.
- Winter, John - Fisherman

== Facts ==
- 1880s outport road board commissioners for Pool's Island were House, Knee, Davis, and King
- The way officer for Pool's Island in the 1880s was Peter House
- Philip Knee was the ferryman in Pool's Island in the 1890s
- Sealing steamer captain Benjamin Kean was born on Pool's Island, some of his steamers were the Greenland in 1877, and Hector in 1889.
- Pool's Island lost five men in the Greenland Disaster of 1898 under Captain George Barbour. They were: Benjamin Bown, James Howell, William Kelloway, Joseph Osmond, and Thomas White.
