= Newfoundland and Labrador Route 320 =

Highway in Newfoundland and Labrador, Canada

Route 320
- Road to the Shore

Route information
- Maintained by Newfoundland and Labrador Department of Transportation and Infrastructure
- Length: 80.9 km (50.3 mi)

Major junctions
- South end: Route 1 (TCH) (Exit 24) at Gambo
- North end: New-Wes-Valley (transitions into Route 330)

Location
- Country: Canada
- Province: Newfoundland and Labrador

Highway system
- Highways in Newfoundland and Labrador
← Route 310	→ Route 330

Route 320, also the eastern portion of the Road to the Shore, starts at the Trans-Canada Highway (Route 1) at Gambo and runs north past Hare Bay, Dover, Indian Bay, Centreville-Wareham-Trinity, Greenspond through to New-Wes-Valley. Here, it connects with Route 330 which continues around the Cape Freels headland and exits back onto the TCH at Gander.

== Route description ==
Route 320 begins in Gambo at an interchange with Route 1 (Trans-Canada Highway, Exit 24) and it heads northeast along the banks of Gambo River to pass through downtown before leaving Gambo and winding its way along Freshwater Bay for several kilometres. The highway now passes through Hare Bay, where it meets a local road leading to Dover, before passing through more inland and rural areas for several kilometres. Route 320 then heads through the towns of Centreville-Wareham-Trinity and Indian Bay to meet a local road leading to Greenspond. The highway now passes through more rural terrain before having two intersections with local road that loops through New-Wes-Valley, with the latter of the two being where Route 320 transitions to Route 330 (Road to the Shore/Gander Bay Road).

== Major intersections ==
Location	km	mi	Destinations	Notes
Gambo	0.0	0.0	Route 1 (TCH) – Clarenville, Gander, Grand Falls-Windsor	Exit 24 on Route 1; southern terminus
Hare Bay	27.2	16.9	Wellington Road (Route 320-26) - Dover	
	65.8	40.9	Greenspond Road (Route 320-33) - Greenspond	
New-Wes-Valley	75.1	46.7	Quay Road (Route 320-34) - New-Wes-Valley	
New-Wes-Valley	80.9	50.3	Transitions to Route 330 west (Road to the Shore/Gander Bay Road) – Musgrave Harbour, Gander; Main Street (Route 320-36) - New-Wes-Valley	Northern terminus
1.000 mi = 1.609 km; 1.000 km = 0.621 mi: Route transition

== See also ==
- List of Newfoundland and Labrador highways
