= Templeman, Newfoundland and Labrador =

Coordinates: 49°11′54″N 53°33′07″W

Templeman is a community of New-Wes-Valley in Newfoundland, Canada, located on the north side of Bonavista Bay just south of Cape Freels and north of Wesleyville. Templeman has a shallow and rocky harbour, and can only accommodate small boats.

== History ==
This fishing community was originally named Fox Cove and was settled in the 1870s. Settlers that came to Templeman were from nearby islands such as Bennett's Island, Cobbler's Island, and Pinchard's Island. Some of the family names that came from those areas, to Templeman, are Green, Tuff, Howell, and Vincent. The decision to settle in Templeman was most likely due to the Labrador Fishery.

Templeman first appears in the 1884 Census with a population of 75. By 1901 the population had increased to 225 people. However, with the collapse of the Labrador fishery in the 1930s, Templeman's population suffered a sharp decline. In 1921 there were 51 families living in Templeman, by 1971 there were only 55 people. As time passed, Templeman's population was able to rebound just slightly as people from Wesleyville moved there. Templeman became part of Wesleyville in 1992. The community is now a part of the town of New-Wes-Valley.

== Church history ==
When the population was 75 in 1884, 55 of those people were Methodist, the others were Church of England. In 1911, 212 of the 225 people in Templeman were Methodist. In 1900 a school house was built in the settlement which also served as a chapel for church services; however, it was destroyed by fire in 1916. In 1915 a Methodist church was built which was used for a school as well. A new church was built in Templeman in the 1960s.

== Interesting facts ==
- In 1956 the postmaster was Josephine Howell.
- The population was 216 in 1940 and 94 in 1956.

== See also ==
- List of communities in Newfoundland and Labrador
