= Lethbridge, Newfoundland and Labrador =

Unincorporated community in Newfoundland and Labrador

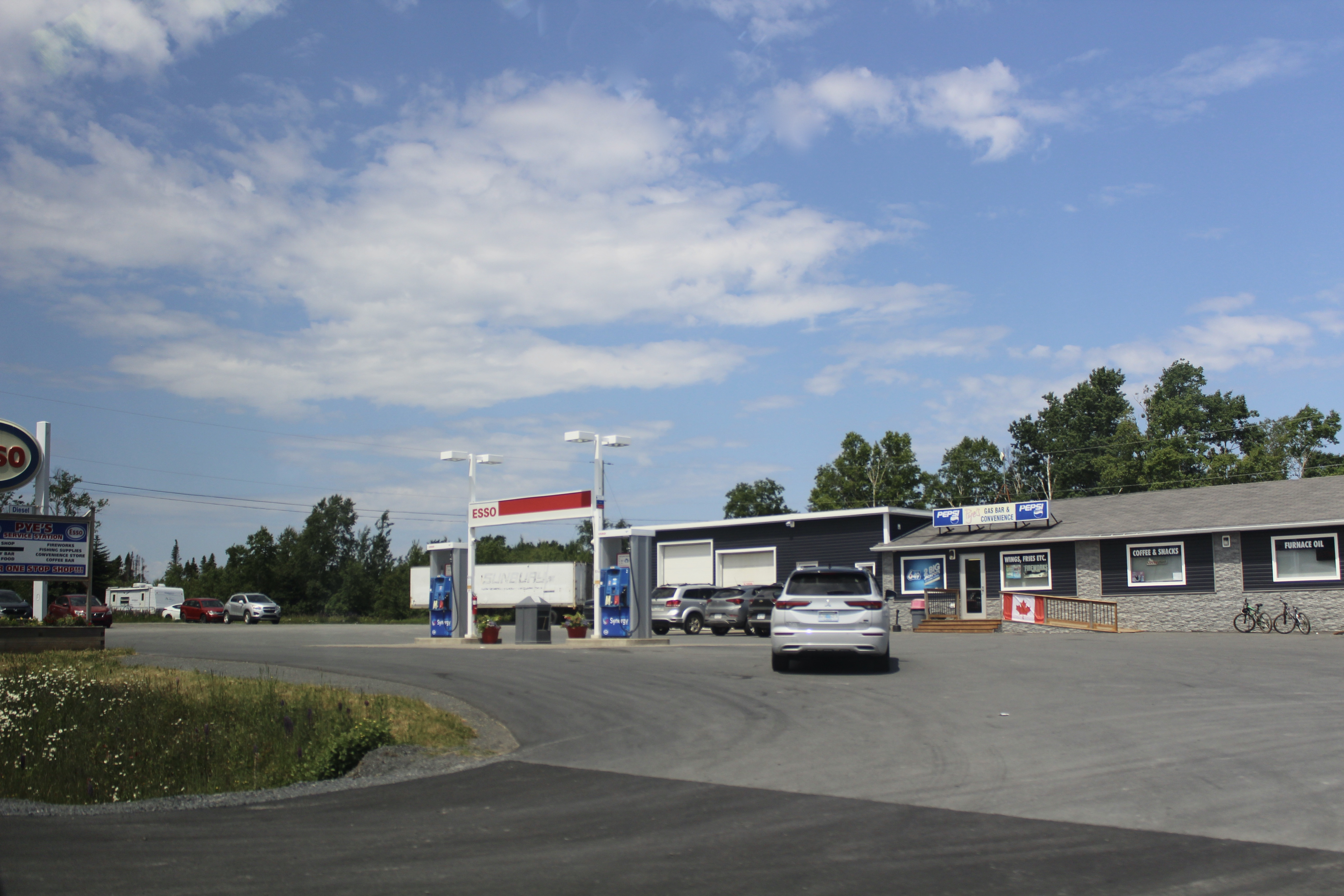
Gas station in Lethbridge

The community of Lethbridge (48°22′06″N 53°52′10″W) is located 20 km (12 mi) from Clarenville, Newfoundland and Labrador along Route 230, on the Cabot Highway, to Bonavista. Route 233 and Route 234 also pass through the community. It is an unincorporated community with a population of 635 (2016). It is part of the local service district of Lethbridge and Area.

Forestry (including pulp and saw mills) is the main industry in the area, as well as the farming of such crops as: potatoes, carrots, turnips, cabbage and various berries. There is limited poultry and beef production.

== Geography and climate ==
Lethbridge has a humid continental climate (Köppen Dfb). The average annual temperature in Lethbridge is 5.4 °C (41.7 °F). The average annual precipitation is 1,260.0 mm (49.61 in) with October as the wettest month. The temperatures are highest on average in August, at around 17.1 °C (62.8 °F), and lowest in January, at around −5.5 °C (22.1 °F). The highest temperature ever recorded in Lethbridge was 34.0 °C (93.2 °F) on 24 August 2008; the coldest temperature ever recorded was −31.0 °C (−23.8 °F) on 27 January 2008.

Climate data for Lethbridge, Newfoundland and Labrador Climate ID: 8402544; coordinates 48°21′00″N 53°54′06″W; elevation: 15.2 m (50 ft); 1991–2020 normals, extremes 1962–present
Month	Jan	Feb	Mar	Apr	May	Jun	Jul	Aug	Sep	Oct	Nov	Dec	Year
Record high °C (°F)	16.0 (60.8)	15.0 (59.0)	17.0 (62.6)	22.0 (71.6)	33.0 (91.4)	31.0 (87.8)	34.0 (93.2)	34.0 (93.2)	31.0 (87.8)	24.5 (76.1)	20.0 (68.0)	16.0 (60.8)	34.0 (93.2)
Mean daily maximum °C (°F)	−0.9 (30.4)	−0.6 (30.9)	2.2 (36.0)	7.1 (44.8)	12.8 (55.0)	17.8 (64.0)	22.6 (72.7)	22.5 (72.5)	18.0 (64.4)	11.9 (53.4)	6.5 (43.7)	1.8 (35.2)	10.1 (50.2)
Daily mean °C (°F)	−5.5 (22.1)	−5.4 (22.3)	−2.3 (27.9)	2.8 (37.0)	7.5 (45.5)	12.0 (53.6)	16.9 (62.4)	17.1 (62.8)	12.8 (55.0)	7.6 (45.7)	2.8 (37.0)	−1.8 (28.8)	5.4 (41.7)
Mean daily minimum °C (°F)	−10.1 (13.8)	−10.1 (13.8)	−6.8 (19.8)	−1.6 (29.1)	2.1 (35.8)	6.2 (43.2)	11.0 (51.8)	11.6 (52.9)	7.6 (45.7)	3.4 (38.1)	−1.0 (30.2)	−5.4 (22.3)	0.6 (33.1)
Record low °C (°F)	−31.0 (−23.8)	−31.0 (−23.8)	−30.0 (−22.0)	−26.0 (−14.8)	−8.0 (17.6)	−4.5 (23.9)	−1.0 (30.2)	−1.5 (29.3)	−5.0 (23.0)	−9.0 (15.8)	−17.0 (1.4)	−25.0 (−13.0)	−31.0 (−23.8)
Average precipitation mm (inches)	102.6 (4.04)	102.0 (4.02)	93.9 (3.70)	98.0 (3.86)	96.0 (3.78)	86.4 (3.40)	99.8 (3.93)	98.3 (3.87)	122.2 (4.81)	128.5 (5.06)	111.8 (4.40)	120.7 (4.75)	1,260 (49.61)
Average rainfall mm (inches)	44.9 (1.77)	45.1 (1.78)	51.8 (2.04)	77.9 (3.07)	94.7 (3.73)	86.4 (3.40)	99.8 (3.93)	98.3 (3.87)	122.2 (4.81)	126.8 (4.99)	102.3 (4.03)	79.7 (3.14)	1,029.8 (40.54)
Average snowfall cm (inches)	57.7 (22.7)	56.0 (22.0)	41.7 (16.4)	20.2 (8.0)	1.3 (0.5)	0.0 (0.0)	0.0 (0.0)	0.0 (0.0)	0.0 (0.0)	1.7 (0.7)	9.5 (3.7)	41.0 (16.1)	229.0 (90.2)
Average precipitation days (≥ 0.2 mm)	13.6	13.6	12.7	13.9	15.5	14.0	13.8	14.6	14.4	16.8	15.5	15.5	173.8
Average rainy days (≥ 0.2 mm)	5.9	6.2	7.7	11.6	15.4	14.0	13.8	14.6	14.4	16.8	13.8	10.4	144.6
Average snowy days (≥ 0.2 cm)	9.4	8.9	6.8	3.7	0.38	0.0	0.0	0.0	0.0	0.22	2.3	6.7	38.4
Source: Environment and Climate Change Canada

== See also ==
- List of communities in Newfoundland and Labrador
