= Pound Cove =

Community in Newfoundland, Canada

Coordinates: 49°10′34″N 53°33′36″W

Pound Cove is a community in Newfoundland and Labrador, Canada, located north of Wesleyville.

Pound Cove was settled during the Labrador fishery. In 1884, Pound Cove was listed as "Punch Cove" with a population of 106. It was inhabited by people from Flowers Island and Pinchard's Island. By 1890, there were 114 people living there, of which, 68 of them were members of the Church of England. In 1901 the population had increased to 168, with 89 Church of England members, 65 Methodists, and 14 members of the Salvation Army.

In 1899, a Church of England school was built and also served as a chapel. A Methodist school-chapel was built in 1908; a school was not built until 1948.

Since 1992, the community has been a part of the town of New-Wes-Valley.

== See also ==
- List of communities in Newfoundland and Labrador
