= Beaton Tulk =

Canadian politician (1944–2019)

7th Premier of Newfoundland
- In office October 16, 2000 – February 13, 2001
- Monarch: Elizabeth II
- Lieutenant Governor: Arthur Maxwell House
- Preceded by: Brian Tobin
- Succeeded by: Roger Grimes

Deputy Premier of Newfoundland
- In office August 4, 2000 – October 16, 2000
- Preceded by: Lynn Verge
- Succeeded by: Tom Rideout

Member of the Newfoundland House of Assembly for Fogo
- In office June 18, 1979 – April 20, 1989
- Succeeded by: Sam Winsor

Member of the Newfoundland House of Assembly for Fogo
- In office May 3, 1993 – February 22, 1996
- Preceded by: Sam Winsor
- Succeeded by: riding dissolved

Member of the Newfoundland House of Assembly for Bonavista North
- In office February 22, 1996 – April 2, 2002
- Preceded by: Tom Lush
- Succeeded by: Harry Harding

Personal details
- Born: Reginald Beaton Tulk; May 22, 1944 Ladle Cove, Newfoundland
- Died: May 23, 2019 (aged 75) Musgravetown, Newfoundland and Labrador, Canada
- Party: Liberal Party of Newfoundland and Labrador
- Other political affiliations: Liberal Party of Canada
- Spouse: Dora Tulk (until his death)
- Occupation: Teacher, politician
- Cabinet: Minister of Forest Resources and Agrifoods (May 1997 – July 1997), Minister of Development and Rural Renewal (July 1997 – October 2000)

Reginald Beaton Tulk (May 22, 1944 – May 23, 2019) was a Canadian educator, civil servant and politician. He served as the seventh premier of Newfoundland from 2000 to 2001 as a member of the Liberal Party of Newfoundland and Labrador. To date, he is the last premier of the province to be born in the British dependent territory of Newfoundland, before its accession to Canada as a province.

== Early life ==
Born in Ladle Cove, Newfoundland, Tulk was the youngest son of Japhet Tulk and Sadie (née West). He graduated from Memorial University with BA, B.Ed, and Master of Educational Administration degrees. He also later obtained a Canadian Securities Investment Diploma. An educator prior to politics, he was a supervising principal for the Carmanville school system from 1974 to 1979.

== Political career ==
Tulk was first elected to the Newfoundland House of Assembly in 1979 as the Liberal Party of Newfoundland (later Liberal Party of Newfoundland and Labrador) member for Fogo, and was re-elected in 1982 and 1985. He was defeated in the 1989 election; in 1990, he became the Assistant Deputy Minister of Children and Youth Services for the Newfoundland government. He was returned to the House of Assembly for Fogo in 1993. He was then elected in the newly redistributed riding of Bonavista North in 1996, and re-elected in 1999.

Tulk was appointed Minister of Forest Resources and Agrifoods in May 1997 and Minister of Development and Rural Renewal in July 1997. In December 1998, he stepped down from cabinet when he was the subject of allegations of wrongdoing by the owner of a private college. He was cleared of any wrongdoing by the police and by a commissioner's report, and returned to the cabinet in April 1999. He was appointed Deputy Premier in August 2000 and Premier of Newfoundland in October 2000 when his predecessor, Brian Tobin, returned to federal politics. He was not a candidate in the race to succeed Tobin as Liberal leader and returned to the position of Deputy Premier in February 2001 when Roger Grimes was elected Liberal leader and sworn in as Premier.

In 2002, Tulk resigned his provincial seat to run unsuccessfully for the federal Liberals for the House of Commons of Canada seat of Gander—Grand Falls in a by-election after George Baker was appointed to the Senate, but was defeated by Rex Barnes. Tulk then tried to return to provincial politics, running in the provincial by-election resulting from his own resignation, but was defeated by Harry Harding.

On December 16, 2002, Tulk was appointed by the federal government of Jean Chrétien to the Canadian Transportation Agency.

== Later life ==
In 2018, Flanker Press released his autobiography, A Man of My Word, co-written by Laurie Blackwood Pike. He lived in Musgravetown with his wife Dora during his final years.

Tulk died from prostate cancer on May 23, 2019, one day after his 75th birthday. He was diagnosed with the illness 15 years prior to his death. Prime Minister Justin Trudeau praised Tulk's career of "putting people first", and cited his death as a "loss of a great Canadian and a great Liberal".
