= Ursula Kelly =

Canadian University Research Professor

- Born: 1956 (age 69–70); Gambo, Newfoundland and Labrador

Academic background
- Education: MEd., 1983, Memorial University of Newfoundland; PhD, University of Toronto
- Thesis: Marketing place: regional readers reading capitalism, patriarchy, and culture (1989)

Academic work
- Institutions: Saint Mary's University; Mount Saint Vincent University; Memorial University of Newfoundland

Ursula Anne Margaret Kelly (born 1956) is a Canadian University Research Professor at Memorial University of Newfoundland.

== Early life and education ==
Kelly was born in 1956 and raised in Gambo, Newfoundland and Labrador to parents Margaret Waterman Kelly, a teacher, and Andrew J. Kelly. Kelly later created "The Margaret Waterman Kelly Teaching Prize" at Memorial University of Newfoundland (MUN) in honour of her mother who had attended the institution as a student.

Kelly earned three degrees at MUN before enrolling in the University of Toronto for her PhD.

== Career ==
After earning her PhD, Kelly moved to Halifax, Nova Scotia, where she accepted a faculty position at Saint Mary's University from 1988 until 1994 and Mount Saint Vincent University. In 2001, Kelly accepted a faculty position at MUN and taught Education 6106, a graduate course elective.

In 2009, she published Migration and education in a multicultural world: Culture, loss, and identity, a collection of essays regarding the impact mass migration has on identity displacement, disorientation, and loss. The following year, Kelly published a collection of essays titled Despite This Loss: Essays on Place, Culture and Memory with Elizabeth Yeoman.

Kelly later accepted a Fogo Island Research Fellowship program position to interact with members of Fogo Island and understand their culture and livelihood. In 2018, she co-authored a book with Meghan C. Forsyth titled The Music of Our Burnished Axes: Songs and Stories of the Woods Workers of Newfoundland and Labrador. The book is a collection of songs, tunes, recitations, poems, and narratives focused on the contributions wood workers had on Newfoundland and Labrador. In the same year, Kelly was promoted to University Research Professor at MUN, the highest academic title a professor could obtain at the institution.
