= Flowers Island =

Island in Newfoundland and Labrador

Coordinates: 51.3086°N 56.7470°W

Flowers Island was one of the communities in an area on the northeast coast of the Island of Newfoundland called Bonavista North. These communities have a shared history in that they were settled by people from England, predominantly from the West Country—Dorset, Devon Somerset and Hampshire.

== Geography ==
Flowers Island is in Newfoundland in Northern Bonavista Bay. It consists of two islands, Kean's Island and Sturge's Island which are separated by the narrow Flowers Island Tickle. The islands are close together with numerous shoals to the south and east and islets in the northeast. Flowers Island had excellent fishing grounds and was located in the path of the migrating harp seals, thus being an important part of the island's economy.

== History ==
Flowers Island was most likely visited by fishermen and sealers in the late 18th or early 19th century. The first recorded baptisms on the island were Joseph Kean in 1816 and John Sturge in 1817 at the age of 23. Flowers Island appears in the 1836 Newfoundland Census with a population of 26, by the 1857 Census there were 66 people living there. The inhabitants relied on the small-boat, inshore cod fishery and a land based seal hunt. Flowers Island was eventually vacated with the decline of the local fishery, the rise of the Labrador cod fishery, the seal hunt, and technological changes. By 1911 there were only eight people living there; eventually they all resettled.

== Church history ==
In the beginning, all the inhabitants of Flowers Island were Church of England, until Methodism was introduced to them in 1874 and the Salvation Army in 1891. There was no church on Flowers Island but missionaries from other areas visited the island to perform services, baptisms, burials, marriages, and visits to the sick. For example, the first missionary stationed in nearby Greenspond, Rev. N.A. Coster, visited Flowers Island on several occasions. In September 1830 he notes that there was a congregation of 35 consisting of people by the names of Kean, Sturge, Roger, and Perry. By 1891 the population had reached 64, 30 of them were Church of England, 4 were Methodist, and 30 were Salvation Army.

== Education history ==
There was no school on Flowers Island but records do show that the children were attending school in 1874. W. Kean, who was sent to school in Greenspond and was the only literate person on Flowers Island, found a Methodist teacher around 1875, Miss Lucretia Oakley, to teach on the island.

== Sealing ==
The seal hunt was very important to the economy of Newfoundland, especially for communities on the northeast. Sealing in Flowers Island really took off when the Kean family became sealing captains. The first boat on the island was built there by the Keans. The first Keans to become involved were Joseph and William with four vessels: Shaver, Gleaner, Emerald, and Barbara. A new firm, William Kean and Brothers tool over on the island and had much success. In 1874 for example, they had a catch of 3,100 seals compared to their 1884 catch of 786. Captain Abram Kean or Flowers Island, is probably the most well-known of the Newfoundland sealing captains, he had his first trip to the fishery in 1872 from Flowers Island. Eight years later he moved to Norton's Cove (Brookfield). He set a record for the most seal pelts at 1,052,737 during his career. Altogether he commanded nine steamers: The Wolf, Hope, Aurora, Terra Nova, Florizel, Stephano, Nascopie, Thetis, and Beothic II. He also set a record for most seals brought in from one voyage in 1910 with 49,069 pelts which was beaten in 1933 by a Captain Albert Blackwood.

In 1845 there was one steamer of 40 tons on Flowers Island under Captain Kean named the Young Shaver. Other sealing statistics are:

| | # of seal nets | boats for sealing |
|---|---|---|
| 1836 | - | 1 |
| 1845 | 60 | 2 |
| 1857 | 49 | - |
| 1869 | 69 | 1 |

== Directories ==
- Flowers Island was recorded in Hutchinson's Newfoundland Directory for 1864–65 with two names:

- Joseph Kean, Planter and shipowner
- John Sturge, Planter

- Lovell's Newfoundland Directory of 1871 describes Flowers Island as an Island on the north side of Bonavista Bay, distant from Greenspond by nine miles in boat, and having a population of 82. The names listed are:

- Benjamin Kenne (Keane?), Planter
- Joseph Kenne (Keane?), Planter
- Samuel Kenne (Keane?), Planter
- William Kenne (Keane?) Jr., Fisherman
- Edward Mahan, Fisherman
- John Sturge, Planter
- Mrs. Mary Sturge, Widow
- Samuel Sturge, Fisherman
- Thomas Sturge, Planter

== Census information ==
| | 1836 | 1857 | 1874 |
|---|---|---|---|
| population | 26 | 66 | 91 |
| inhabited homes | 3 | 5 | 11 |
| families | - | 8 | 15 |
| Church of England | 26 | 66 | 73 |
| Wesleyan | - | - | 18 |
| can read and write | - | - | 9 |
| people catching and curing fish | - | 50 | 52 |
| seamen and fishermen | - | 14 | 17 |
| total fishing boats | 3 | 7 | 3 |
| boats built | - | 1 | |
| fishing rooms in use | - | 3 | 6 |
| vessels in seal fishery | - | 1 | 3 |
| men on board | - | 27 | 91 |
| tonnage in fishery | - | 80 | 226 |
| nets and seines | - | 7 | 53 |
| cod fish cured (qtls) | - | 1000 | 1120 |
| seals | - | 750 | 3100 |
| seal nets | - | 49 | 49 |
| potatoes produced | 122.5 bushels | 74 barrels | 105 barrels |
| cattle | 3 | - | - |
| hogs | 4 | - | - |
| swine/goats | - | 6 | 17 |
| stores, barns, outhouses | - | 7 | 6 |
| oil produced (tuns) | - | 3 1/4 | 800 |

== Interesting facts ==
- J. Spurrell and W. Kean were members on the board of road commissioners in the 1840s.
- Famous sealing captain Abram Kean, was born in Flowers Island. His first steamer was the Wolf in 1889, his last was in 1936.

== See also ==
- List of ghost towns in Newfoundland and Labrador
