= Dover, Newfoundland and Labrador =

Dover Shoal Bay, Wellington
- Town
- Location of Dover in Newfoundland
- Coordinates: 48°52′11″N 53°58′14″W
- Country: Canada
- Province: Newfoundland and Labrador
- Settled: Early 1890s

Area
  - Land: 11.55 km^{2} (4.46 sq mi)

Population (2021)
  - Total: 579
  - Density: 57.3/km^{2} (148/sq mi)
- Time zone: UTC-3:30 (Newfoundland Time)
  - Summer (DST): UTC-2:30 (Newfoundland Daylight)
- Area code: 709
- Highways: Route 320

Dover is a small incorporated fishing and lumbering village located in a small cove at the head of Freshwater Bay, Bonavista Bay, Newfoundland, Canada. Settled in the early 1890s it was originally known as Shoal Bay, presumably from its many shallow coves and inlets in the area. From the 1950s to the 1970 Shoal Bay was referred to as Wellington (Dover Post Office), whereas the local residents called it Dover.

The first census taken of the community was in 1891 when seventeen people were counted, both lumbermen and fisherman. By 1901 the population had grown to sixty-six people and by 1921 it had grown to 203. The 2016 Census reported that its population was 662 people. The mayor of Dover is Tony Keats.

Near Dover is a geological feature called the Dover Fault, a major break in the Earth's crust. It is the dividing line for Gondwana and Laurentia that was formed by the Iapetus Ocean. A song in the Broadway musical Come From Away takes place at the lookout over the fault.

== Demographics ==
In the 2021 Census of Population conducted by Statistics Canada, Dover had a population of 579 living in 242 of its 264 total private dwellings, a change of −12.5% from its 2016 population of 662. With a land area of 11.12 km^{2} (4.29 sq mi), it had a population density of 52.1/km^{2} (134.9/sq mi) in 2021.

== See also ==
- List of cities and towns in Newfoundland and Labrador
