= New-Wes-Valley =

- Town
- Location of New-Wes-Valley in Newfoundland
- Coordinates: 49°09′N 53°35′W
- Country: Canada
- Province: Newfoundland and Labrador
- Settled: 1800s
- Incorporated: 1992

Area
  - Total: 133.59 km^{2} (51.58 sq mi)

Population (2021)
  - Total: 2,044
- Time zone: UTC-3:30 (Newfoundland Time)
  - Summer (DST): UTC-2:30 (Newfoundland Daylight)
- Area code: 709
- Highways: Route 320; Route 330
- Website: www.townofnewwesvalley.ca

New-Wes-Valley is a municipality in Newfoundland and Labrador, Canada.

Incorporated in 1992, it is located at the Northern end of Bonavista Bay just south of Cape Freels.

New-Wes-Valley takes its name from the towns of Newtown, Wesleyville, and Valleyfield. The municipality was formed by the combination of eight original villages: Newtown, Templeman, Pound Cove, Wesleyville, Brookfield, Badger's Quay, Pool's Island and Valleyfield, which all adjoin each other along a 15 km stretch of coastline containing many harbours, coves and islands. The terrain of the area is barren, rocky and relatively flat in comparison with much of the province. Today, the eight villages retain much of their own identity, with the municipality still containing as many as twelve churches.

The history of fishery in the area goes back to the 18th century, and it was settled by English fishermen permanently in the early to mid-19th century. Many of the early fishermen originally lived in island settlements such as Swains Island, Pinchards Island, and Flower's Island just offshore and close to the rich inshore fishing grounds. The inhabitants of these islands resettled to the mainland during the 19th century, with further island resettlement occurring within the area as late as 1953. In the 19th and early 20th centuries, this area was home to famous Newfoundland sealing families including the Keans, Winsors and Barbours. Today the area still contains beautiful homes, churches and mercantile premises dating from the 19th century.

The economy of the town has been mainly supported by the fish plant in Valleyfield, owned by Beothic Fisheries since the 1960s. Like many other Newfoundland fishing communities, the town has suffered from out-migration and declining population in recent years. A peak population of over 3,000 occurred during the 1950s through to the 1990s. Today, tourism is an important industry, with several heritage buildings and sites to visit, including the Barbour Living Heritage Village, at Newtown.

The area was connected by highways to the rest of the province in the 1950s. Prior to that transportation was by boat, with passenger services linking to the railroad at Gambo, about 70 km away. One of the most famous living persons from Wesleyville, New-Wes-Valley is David Blackwood, an internationally known Canadian artist whose work is inspired by his childhood memories of the area.

== Demographics ==
In the 2021 Census of Population conducted by Statistics Canada, New-Wes-Valley had a population of 2,044 living in 903 of its 1,089 total private dwellings, a change of −5.9% from its 2016 population of 2,172. With a land area of 132.7 km^{2} (51.2 sq mi), it had a population density of 15.4/km^{2} (39.9/sq mi) in 2021.

== See also ==
- List of cities and towns in Newfoundland and Labrador
