= Morley's Siding =

Coordinates: 48.309°N 53.926°W

Location of Morley's Siding in Newfoundland and Labrador

Morley's Siding is a settlement in Newfoundland and Labrador. It is part of the local service district of Lethbridge and Area.
