= Hare Bay, Newfoundland and Labrador =

Hare Bay
- Town
- Motto: Gateway To The Sea
- Location of Hare Bay in Newfoundland
- Coordinates: 48°51′17″N 54°00′33″W
- Country: Canada
- Province: Newfoundland and Labrador
- Census division: 7
- Established: 1886

Government
  - Mayor: Darlene Collins

Population (2021)
  - Total: 925
- Time zone: UTC-3:30 (Newfoundland Time)
  - Summer (DST): UTC-2:30 (Newfoundland Daylight)
- Area code: 709
- Highways: Route 320
- Website: Town Of Hare Bay Municipal website

Hare Bay (2021 Population 925) is a Canadian town on Newfoundland's Route 320 in the province of Newfoundland and Labrador. It is in Division No. 7 on Bonavista Bay.

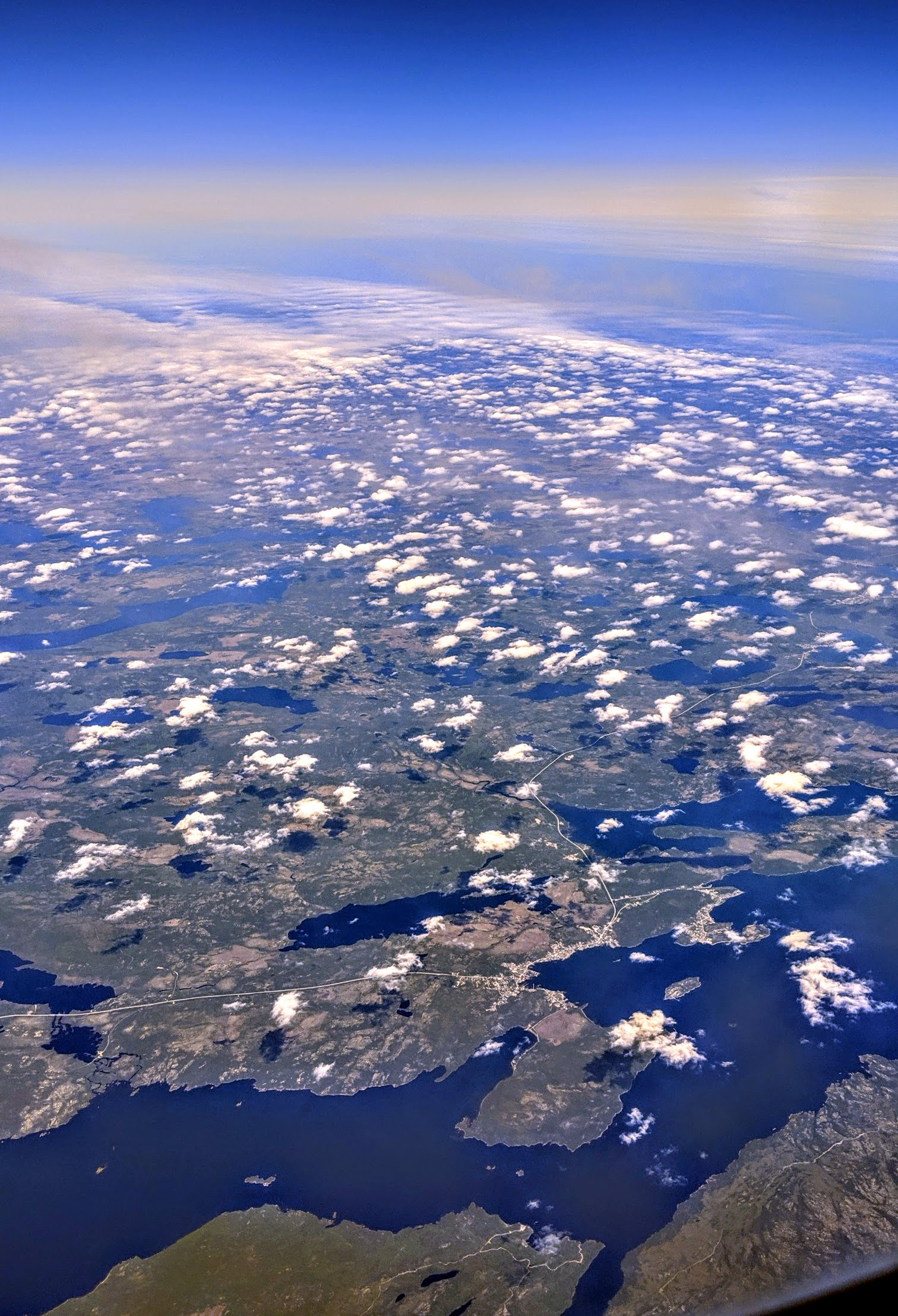
Aerial view of Hare Bay and vicinity

== Demographics ==
In the 2021 Census of Population conducted by Statistics Canada, Hare Bay had a population of 925 living in 387 of its 453 total private dwellings, a change of −4.5% from its 2016 population of 969. With a land area of 34.11 km^{2} (13.17 sq mi), it had a population density of 27.1/km^{2} (70.2/sq mi) in 2021.
