= Bloomfield, Newfoundland and Labrador =

Human settlement in Newfoundland, Canada

Coordinates: 48°22′43″N 53°54′41″W

Bloomfield is a designated place in the Canadian province of Newfoundland and Labrador. It is on the east coast of the island of Newfoundland, approximately 230 kilometres from the capital city of St. John's and approximately 95 kilometres from Bonavista. Bloomfield is located in a non-tax district which falls underneath the community of Lethbridge.

The community was founded in 1860 by a man named Honeyburn.

== Geography ==
Bloomfield is in Newfoundland within Subdivision E of Division No. 7.

== Demographics ==
As a designated place in the 2016 Census of Population conducted by Statistics Canada, Bloomfield recorded a population of 523 living in 224 of its 264 total private dwellings, a change of -2.1% from its 2011 population of 534. With a land area of 9.87 km^{2} (3.81 sq mi), it had a population density of 53.0/km^{2} (137.2/sq mi) in 2016.

== See also ==
- List of communities in Newfoundland and Labrador
- List of designated places in Newfoundland and Labrador
