= Harry Harding (politician) =

Canadian politician

The Honourable Harry Harding ECNL

Minister of Government Services, And Minister Responsible for the Government Purchasing Agency of Newfoundland and Labrador
- In office October 2010 – September 19, 2011
- Preceded by: Kevin O'Brien
- Succeeded by: Paul Davis

Member of the Newfoundland and Labrador House of Assembly for Bonavista North
- In office 2002 – September 19, 2011
- Preceded by: Beaton Tulk
- Succeeded by: Eli Cross

Personal details
- Born: July 31, 1946 (age 80) Dominion of Newfoundland
- Party: Progressive Conservative

Harry Harding is a Canadian politician in Newfoundland and Labrador, Canada. He represented the district of Bonavista North in the Newfoundland and Labrador House of Assembly from 2002 to 2011 as a member of the Progressive Conservative Party.

After the death of Municipal Affairs Minister Dianne Whalen in October 2010 Premier Danny Williams appointed Harding to Cabinet as the Minister responsible for Government Services, taking over for Kevin O'Brien who succeeded Whalen.

== Electoral results ==
2007 Newfoundland and Labrador general election
Party	Candidate	Votes	%	±%
Progressive Conservative	Harry Harding	2883	67.76%	–
Liberal	Winston Carter	1292	30.36%	
NDP	E. Howard Parsons	80	1.88%	

2003 Newfoundland and Labrador general election
Party	Candidate	Votes	%	±%
Progressive Conservative	Harry Harding	3384	58.33%	+1.26%
Liberal	Churence Rogers	2301	39.67%	-2.67%
NDP	E. Howard Parsons	116	2.00%	+1.42%

By-Election, 2002 On the resignation of Beaton Tulk
Party	Candidate	Votes	%	±%
Progressive Conservative	Harry Harding	3424	57.07%	+32.60%
Liberal	Beaton Tulk	2540	42.34%	-33.19%
NDP	E. Howard Parsons	35	0.58%	+0.58%
