= Port Blandford =

- Town
- Seal

- Location of Port Blandford in Newfoundland
- Coordinates: 48°21′N 54°10′W
- Country: Canada
- Province: Newfoundland and Labrador
- Census division: 7

Area
  - Total: 50.56 km^{2} (19.52 sq mi)
- Elevation: 39.5 m (130 ft)

Population (2021)
  - Total: 513
  - Density: 11.9/km^{2} (31/sq mi)
- Time zone: UTC-3:30 (Newfoundland Time)
  - Summer (DST): UTC-2:30 (Newfoundland Daylight)
- Postal code span: A0C
- Area code: 709
- Highways: Route 1 (TCH) / Route 233
- Website: www.portblandford.com

Port Blandford is a town in eastern Newfoundland, Newfoundland and Labrador, Canada. It is in Division No. 7 on Clode Sound. The population in 1940 was 539, and increased to 631 by 1956.

The community of Muddy Brook is also a part of the town of Port Blandford.

== Climate ==
Port Blandford has a humid continental climate typical of the island of Newfoundland. It is wet, snowy, highly seasonal and retains warm summers and cold winter nights coupled with relatively mild winter days.

Climate data for Port Blandford
Month	Jan	Feb	Mar	Apr	May	Jun	Jul	Aug	Sep	Oct	Nov	Dec	Year
Record high °C (°F)	15.0 (59.0)	15.5 (59.9)	19.0 (66.2)	24.0 (75.2)	29.5 (85.1)	32.0 (89.6)	33.0 (91.4)	33.0 (91.4)	32.5 (90.5)	24.0 (75.2)	17.5 (63.5)	14.0 (57.2)	33.0 (91.4)
Mean daily maximum °C (°F)	−1.8 (28.8)	−1.1 (30.0)	2.5 (36.5)	7.7 (45.9)	13.9 (57.0)	18.9 (66.0)	23.2 (73.8)	23.2 (73.8)	18.5 (65.3)	12.3 (54.1)	6.6 (43.9)	1.2 (34.2)	10.4 (50.8)
Daily mean °C (°F)	−7.0 (19.4)	−6.5 (20.3)	−2.8 (27.0)	2.9 (37.2)	7.8 (46.0)	12.3 (54.1)	17.0 (62.6)	17.1 (62.8)	12.7 (54.9)	7.4 (45.3)	2.3 (36.1)	−3.1 (26.4)	5.0 (41.0)
Mean daily minimum °C (°F)	−12.1 (10.2)	−11.9 (10.6)	−8.0 (17.6)	−1.9 (28.6)	1.8 (35.2)	5.7 (42.3)	10.8 (51.4)	10.8 (51.4)	6.9 (44.4)	2.5 (36.5)	−2.0 (28.4)	−7.5 (18.5)	−0.4 (31.3)
Record low °C (°F)	−30.0 (−22.0)	−30.0 (−22.0)	−28.0 (−18.4)	−21.5 (−6.7)	−8.5 (16.7)	−4.0 (24.8)	−1.0 (30.2)	−2.0 (28.4)	−4.0 (24.8)	−8.0 (17.6)	−17.0 (1.4)	−25.0 (−13.0)	−30.0 (−22.0)
Average precipitation mm (inches)	92.1 (3.63)	87.2 (3.43)	77.9 (3.07)	76.6 (3.02)	70.8 (2.79)	81.7 (3.22)	73.2 (2.88)	78.1 (3.07)	88.8 (3.50)	93.1 (3.67)	80.9 (3.19)	87.9 (3.46)	988.3 (38.93)
Average rainfall mm (inches)	35.7 (1.41)	41.9 (1.65)	40.4 (1.59)	61.4 (2.42)	69.7 (2.74)	81.7 (3.22)	73.2 (2.88)	78.1 (3.07)	88.8 (3.50)	92.3 (3.63)	66.9 (2.63)	48.5 (1.91)	778.6 (30.65)
Average snowfall cm (inches)	56.4 (22.2)	45.3 (17.8)	37.5 (14.8)	15.2 (6.0)	1.1 (0.4)	0.0 (0.0)	0.0 (0.0)	0.0 (0.0)	0.0 (0.0)	0.8 (0.3)	14.0 (5.5)	39.4 (15.5)	209.7 (82.5)
Source: Environment Canada

== Demographics ==
In the 2021 Census of Population conducted by Statistics Canada, Port Blandford had a population of 513 living in 258 of its 398 total private dwellings, a change of 5.1% from its 2016 population of 488. With a land area of 51 km^{2} (20 sq mi), it had a population density of 10.1/km^{2} (26.1/sq mi) in 2021.

== See also ==
- List of cities and towns in Newfoundland and Labrador
