= Musgravetown =

- Town
- Location of Musgravetown Musgravetown (Canada)
- Coordinates: 48°24′51″N 53°53′32″W
- Country: Canada
- Province: Newfoundland and Labrador
- Settled: 1863

Government
  - Mayor: Melvin Humby
  - MHA: Lloyd Parrott
  - MP: Jonathan Rowe

Population (2021)
  - Total: 561
- Time zone: UTC−03:30 (NST)
  - Summer (DST): UTC−02:30 (NDT)
- Area code: 709
- Highways: Route 233

Musgravetown (pop: 561 in 2021) an incorporated municipality in the sheltered southwest corner of Bonavista Bay on the northeast coast of the island of Newfoundland of the Canadian province of Newfoundland and Labrador.

== Demographics ==
In the 2021 Census of Population conducted by Statistics Canada, Musgravetown had a population of 561 living in 246 of its 301 total private dwellings, a change of −0.5% from its 2016 population of 564. With a land area of 13.49 km^{2} (5.21 sq mi), it had a population density of 41.6/km^{2} (107.7/sq mi) in 2021.

Historical populations
Year	Pop.	±%
1951	567	—
1956	570	+0.5%
1961	597	+4.7%
1966	597	+0.0%
1971	586	−1.8%
1976	641	+9.4%
1981	635	−0.9%
1986	717	+12.9%
1991	726	+1.3%
1996	687	−5.4%
2001	640	−6.8%
2006	583	−8.9%
2011	556	−4.6%
2016	564	+1.4%
2021	561	−0.5%

== See also ==
- List of cities and towns in Newfoundland and Labrador
