= Winter Brook =

Coordinates: 48.431°N 53.739°W

Location of Winter Brook in Newfoundland and Labrador

Winter Brook is a settlement in Newfoundland and Labrador. It is part of the local service district of Lethbridge and Area.

== Reference ==
- Poole, Cyril; Cuff, Robert, eds. (1994). "Winter Brook". Encyclopedia of Newfoundland and Labrador, volume 3. Memorial University of Newfoundland - Digital Archives Initiative: Harry Cuff Publications Ltd. p. 588. "Encyclopedia of Newfoundland and Labrador"
