= Wesleyville, Newfoundland and Labrador =

Settlement in Canada

Coordinates: 49°09′08″N 53°33′50″W

A wood carving of the town seal of Wesleyville on display at Memorial University of Newfoundland.

Wesleyville is a small coastal community in Newfoundland and Labrador, Canada. It is located in Bonavista Bay, on the northeast coast of Newfoundland, near the communities of Greenspond and Newtown. It was settled in the early 19th century, when residents relocated from nearby islands.

Wesleyville is currently one of eight communities which make up the municipality of New-Wes-Valley (a shortened version of Newtown-Wesleyville-Valleyfield, also including Templeman, Pound Cove, Brookfield, Badger's Quay, & Pool's Island.)

== History ==
The first settlers originally lived on Swain's Island, which is often called the "parent of Wesleyville." They moved to the mainland between 1870 and 1930 to what is now called Wesleyville. Wesleyville was named in 1884 after John Wesley, one of the founders of the Methodist movement.

By 1891 the population was close to 2,000. The town relied mostly on the Labrador fishery. With the decline of the fishery in the 1930s the population of Wesleyville began to decrease; there were less than 1,000 people living there by 1945.

When roads, a hospital, and a highway were built in the 1950s, services and businesses began to improve, thus helping the population grow once more. In 1959, a central high school was also built in Wesleyville.

The population peaked in mid-century at about 1,200. Wesleyville is now part of the municipality of New-Wes-Valley, with a population of approximately 2,100. The municipality comprises the villages and towns of the area, including Pool's Island, Badger's Quay, Valleyfield, Brookfield, Wesleyville, Pound Cove, Templeman, and Newtown. The main employer today is a fish processing plant located in Valleyfield, owned by Beothic Fish Processors. Wesleyville is famous for its involvement, historically, in the sealing industry.

== Church history ==
In the 19th century there were only a few resident missionaries stationed in Newfoundland. For example, there was a resident minister in Greenspond who would visit surrounding communities to perform services there. The communities in which the missionaries were responsible for were divided up into missions and circuits. The Greenspond Mission between 1862 and 1884 grew so quickly that the missionaries found it too difficult to visit all the communities so they were broken up into circuits. For example, the growth of Methodists was so great in the late 19th century that by 1884 Wesleyville Circuit was established.

The first minister for the Wesleyville Circuit was the Rev. George Bullen for one year, and then Rev. James Lumsden came in 1885 and left in 1888. The Methodist population had increased from 120 to 226 during Lumsden's ministry.

The first Methodist church was built in 1874. A parsonage was built in Wesleyville in 1887, and a new section was built on the church in 1889. In 1892 there were 611 Methodists in Wesleyville; by 1912 a new Methodist church was built.

Names of ministers who have served the Swain's Island and Wesleyville Congregation since 1874:

- Rev. F Embree 1874-1876
- Rev. W Myers 1876-1878
- Rev. C Lester 1878-1881
- Rev. S Matthews 1881-1884
- Rev. G Bullen 1884-1885
- Rev. J Lumsden 1885-1888
- Rev. S Dunn 1888-1891
- Rev. W Harris 1891-1894
- Rev. S Hill 1894-1896
- Rev. W Tratt 1896-1899
- Rev. H Indoe 1899-1903

== Education history ==
The first church in 1874 was used as the first day school also. The first real Methodist school was built in 1876 and a Sunday school commenced in 1877. By 1885 there were 80 children enrolled in Sunday school and 40 people in adult classes.

Methodist Board of Education in Wesleyville, 1880s:

- Rev James Lumsden
- George Hann
- Japhet Sainesbury
- Abraham Kane
- William Barber
- Richard Parsons
- Henry Melendy

== Interesting facts ==
- Wesleyville is the birthplace of the well-known Canadian artist David Blackwood.
- John Wicks of Wesleyville died in the Greenland Disaster of 1898 under Captain George Barbour.
- Ferryman in late 19th century was Robert Biddlecombe

== See also ==
- List of communities in Newfoundland and Labrador
- Bonavista Bay
- New-Wes-Valley
