= Centreville-Wareham-Trinity =

- Town
- Location of Centreville-Wareham-Trinity in Newfoundland
- Coordinates: 48.98791°N 53.90691°W
- Country: Canada
- Province: Newfoundland and Labrador
- Settled: 1901

Government
  - Mayor: Ivan Pickett

Area
  - Land: 37.25 km^{2} (14.38 sq mi)

Population (2021)
  - Total: 1,116
  - Density: 30.8/km^{2} (80/sq mi)
- Time zone: UTC-3:30 (Newfoundland Time)
  - Summer (DST): UTC-2:30 (Newfoundland Daylight)
- Area code: 709
- Highways: Route 320

Centreville–Wareham–Trinity is a town in the Canadian province of Newfoundland and Labrador, located on Bonavista Bay. The town had a population of 1,116 in the Canada 2021 Census, down from 1,147 in 2016.

== Demographics ==
In the 2021 Census of Population conducted by Statistics Canada, Centreville-Wareham-Trinity had a population of 1,116 living in 499 of its 581 total private dwellings, a change of −2.7% from its 2016 population of 1,147. With a land area of 37.04 km^{2} (14.30 sq mi), it had a population density of 30.1/km^{2} (78.0/sq mi) in 2021.

== Centreville ==
Centreville came into being much later than its neighbouring communities, having been settled in 1959 by settlers moving from Fair Island. Centreville is the location for the primary and elementary school, k-9, which services all three communities as well as another neighbouring community named Indian Bay. Centreville has a skating arena for the winter months and has a small convenience store with a restaurant.

== Trinity ==
Trinity is rather distant from fishing grounds and therefore relies on logging, sawmilling, and shipbuilding.

In the 1800s Trinity served as a winter site of logging for fishermen from islands in Bonavista Bay, especially from the Fair Islands. Settlement occurred gradually in Trinity but was started when a merchant from Fair Island, James Brown, built a water powered sawmill in a bay within Trinity in 1894. His son built a home close to the sawmill so he could manage it. Eventually other members of the Brown family began moving to Trinity. Other people soon followed, such as, Absalom Brown, Israel Gibbons, and Peter Pond.

Trinity appears for the first time in the 1901 Census with a population of fifteen. In 1905 with the establishment of a second sawmill, a steam-powered mill, more families came to Trinity. The new families included the Hunts, Rogers, and Cutlers. In 1911 there were 61 people living in Trinity and by 1935 there were 246. Within ten years the population nearly doubled with 429 people there in 1945, and in 1951 there was a population of 631. The peak population was over 700 in Trinity, however after a devastating forest fire in 1961 the population dropped to 400 as logging and lumber production was greatly hampered.

The first school in Trinity was held in a residents home in 1905 because there was no structure built to school children. Within a year a Church of England building, which served as a school and a chapel, was built. In the 1930s St. Alban's Church was built, and the first teacher and lay reader in Trinity was a W.B. Brown from 1931 to 1957.

== Wareham ==
Wareham was not permanently settled until 1918 but was visited earlier by fishermen from islands off Bonavista Bay to do woods work in the winter season and for boat building. The community was named after the home of the first people who lived there, the Firmages. They were from Wareham, Dorset and they came to Wareham, Newfoundland from Fair Island to continue woods work and they opened a sawmill.

The International Power and Paper Company began cutting pulpwood nearby in 1920, therefore other families soon moved to Wareham, mostly from Fair Island. Some of these families were the Cutlers, Hunts, Rogers, and Wicks.

The first post office was built in 1931 when the name Wareham was chosen for the settlement. By 1935 there was a population of 94, and ten years later there was a population of 149. When Bowater came to nearby Indian Bay in 1950s, and with other areas resettling, the population in Wareham grew to over 300.

The rapid population growth ended in 1961 with a major forest fire which affected many communities in Bonavista Bay and other areas of the northeast coast of Newfoundland.

== See also ==
- Bonavista Bay
- List of cities and towns in Newfoundland and Labrador
