= Goose Bay (Newfoundland and Labrador) =

Bay in Newfoundland and Labrador, Canada

Coordinates: 48.433°N 53.835°W

Goose Bay is a natural bay off the island of Newfoundland in the province of Newfoundland and Labrador, Canada.
