= Brookfield, Newfoundland and Labrador =

Coordinates: 49°08′20″N 53°35′07″W

Brookfield is a Canadian community located on the northeast coast of the island of Newfoundland in the province of Newfoundland and Labrador.

Situated near Wesleyville, it was formerly named Norton's Cove but was changed in 1879 when Captain Abram Kean and his family of nine moved there and renamed it Brookfield. Norton's Cove was settled after 1874 and by 1891 had a population of 147 people; in 1911, the population had grown to 372. The community has since been incorporated into the new municipality of New-Wes-Valley, along with several other former villages.

== Church History ==
In 1891, 138 of the 147 inhabitants in Brookfield were Methodist. Therefore, in 1889 the people of Brookfield began building a church. It was completed and dedicated in July 1891 by Rev. James Nurse. The church could accommodate almost 200 people, and it had a separate area for day and Sunday school. In 1905, a decision was made to build a separate school because the church was no longer large enough for the growing population. Money was being raised since 1891, and with it they renovated their church to make it larger. Ebenezer United Church is still in use in 2008.

== See also ==
- List of communities in Newfoundland and Labrador
