= Brooklyn, Newfoundland and Labrador =

Coordinates: 48.382°N 53.864°W

Location of Brooklyn in Newfoundland and Labrador

Brooklyn is a settlement in Newfoundland and Labrador. It is part of the local service district of Lethbridge and Area.
