= Valleyfield, Newfoundland and Labrador =

Coordinates: 49°07′40″N 53°36′39″W

Valleyfield, Newfoundland is a village and was served by the C.N.R. It joined the Rural District of Badger's Quay-Valleyfield-Pool's Island in April 1980 until 1992 when the District merged with other nearby towns to form New-Wes-Valley. Valleyfield has a good harbour, and is the location of the Beothic Fisheries fish plant.

== History ==
Valleyfield first appears in the 1891 Census as Northwest Arm, with eleven families living there. It was settled by families mainly from Greenspond and Pool's Island. The first settlers in Valleyfield were James and Thomas Ricketts, who were originally from Seal Cove; William Welcher and Christopher and John Stratton from Greenspond; Peter and James Burry, and Abraham, Samuel, and Abel Stratton. In the early 1900s more people moved to Valleyfield including the Winters, Starkes, Sturge, Kean, Blackmore, Hunt, and Roberts.

== Church History ==
In 1891, forty of the 77 people in Valleyfield were Methodist, and in 1903 a Methodist church was built in Valleyfield. The church was dedicated on February 12, 1905. By 1921 the population was 454 and 211 of them were Methodist.

== See also ==
- List of communities in Newfoundland and Labrador
- Bonavista Bay
