= Gambo, Newfoundland and Labrador =

Gambo
- Town
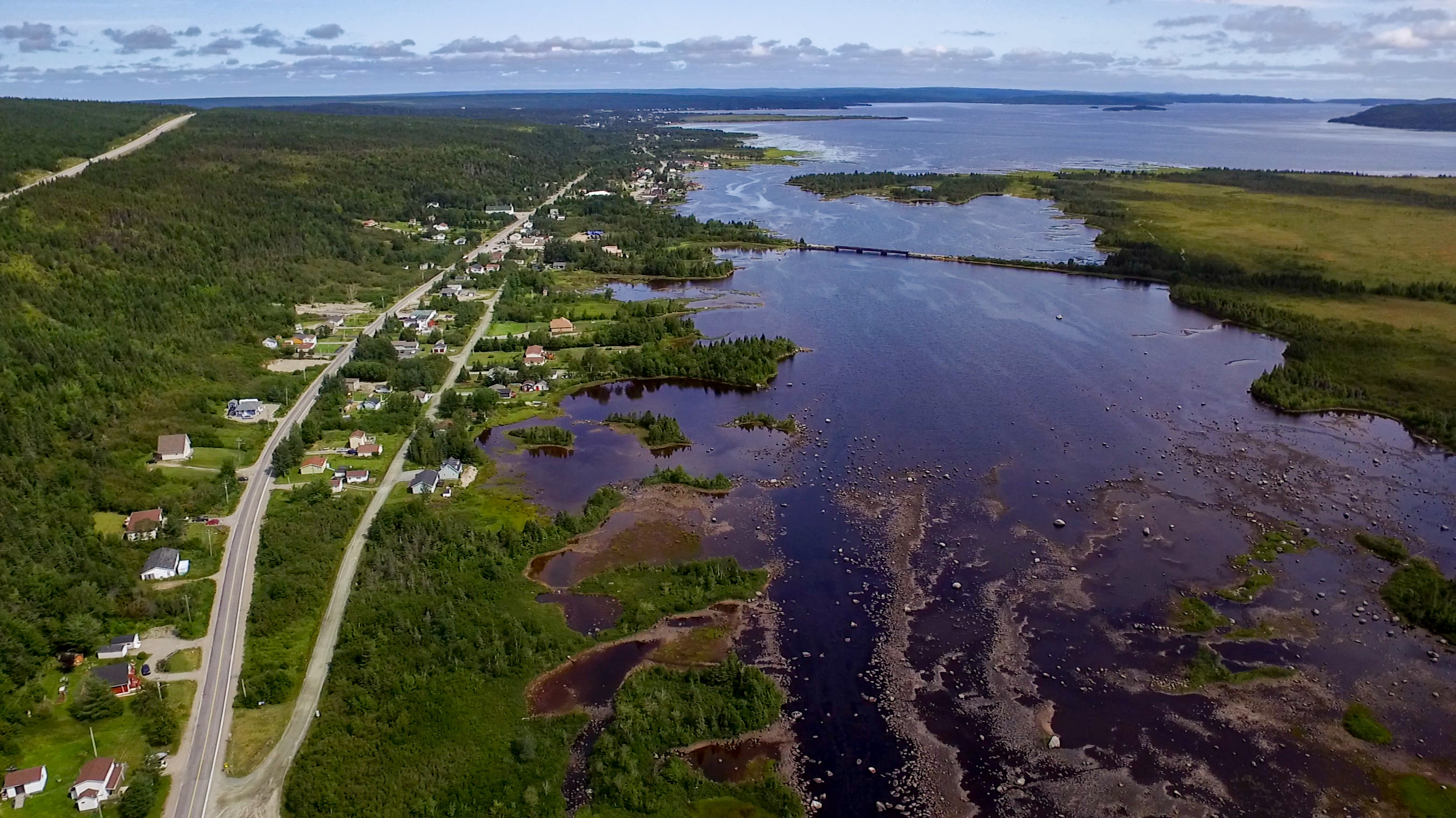

- Location of Gambo in Newfoundland
- Coordinates: 48°47′N 54°13′W
- Country: Canada
- Province: Newfoundland and Labrador
- Census division: 7

Area
  - Total: 92.07 km^{2} (35.55 sq mi)

Population (2021)
  - Total: 1,816
  - Density: 21.5/km^{2} (56/sq mi)
- Time zone: UTC-3:30 (Newfoundland Time)
  - Summer (DST): UTC-2:30 (Newfoundland Daylight)
- Area code: 709
- Highways: Route 1 (TCH); Route 320

Gambo is a town and designated place in the Canadian province of Newfoundland and Labrador. Located in the northeastern portion of the island of Newfoundland on Freshwater Bay, it is in Division No. 7.

Gambo is the closest town to Mint Brook, the birthplace of Joey Smallwood, former premier of Newfoundland and last father of confederation. It is located 47 km (29 mi) from Gander International Airport and 303 km (188 mi) from St. John's.

== History ==
The name Gambo first appeared in the census of 1857. The name Gambo is said by M. F. Howley to be a corruption of a Spanish or Portuguese name that meant "bay of does". The first steam-driven sawmill in Newfoundland was established here. The first-way office was established in 1882 under Waymaster Simeon Osmond. In 1964, the three separate communities of Dark Cove, Middle Brook, and Gambo were incorporated as one town known as Dark Cove-Middle Brook-Gambo. In 1980, the town officially changed its name to Gambo.

== Geography ==
Gambo is in Newfoundland within Subdivision of Division No. 7.

== Demographics ==
In the 2021 Census of Population conducted by Statistics Canada, Gambo had a population of 1,816 living in 807 of its 967 total private dwellings, a change of −8.2% from its 2016 population of 1,978. With a land area of 93.03 km^{2} (35.92 sq mi), it had a population density of 19.5/km^{2} (50.6/sq mi) in 2021.

== Attractions ==
Gambo is known for its Smallwood Days and its Loggers' Sports Festival. One of the town's most important sights is the Logger's Memorial Park.

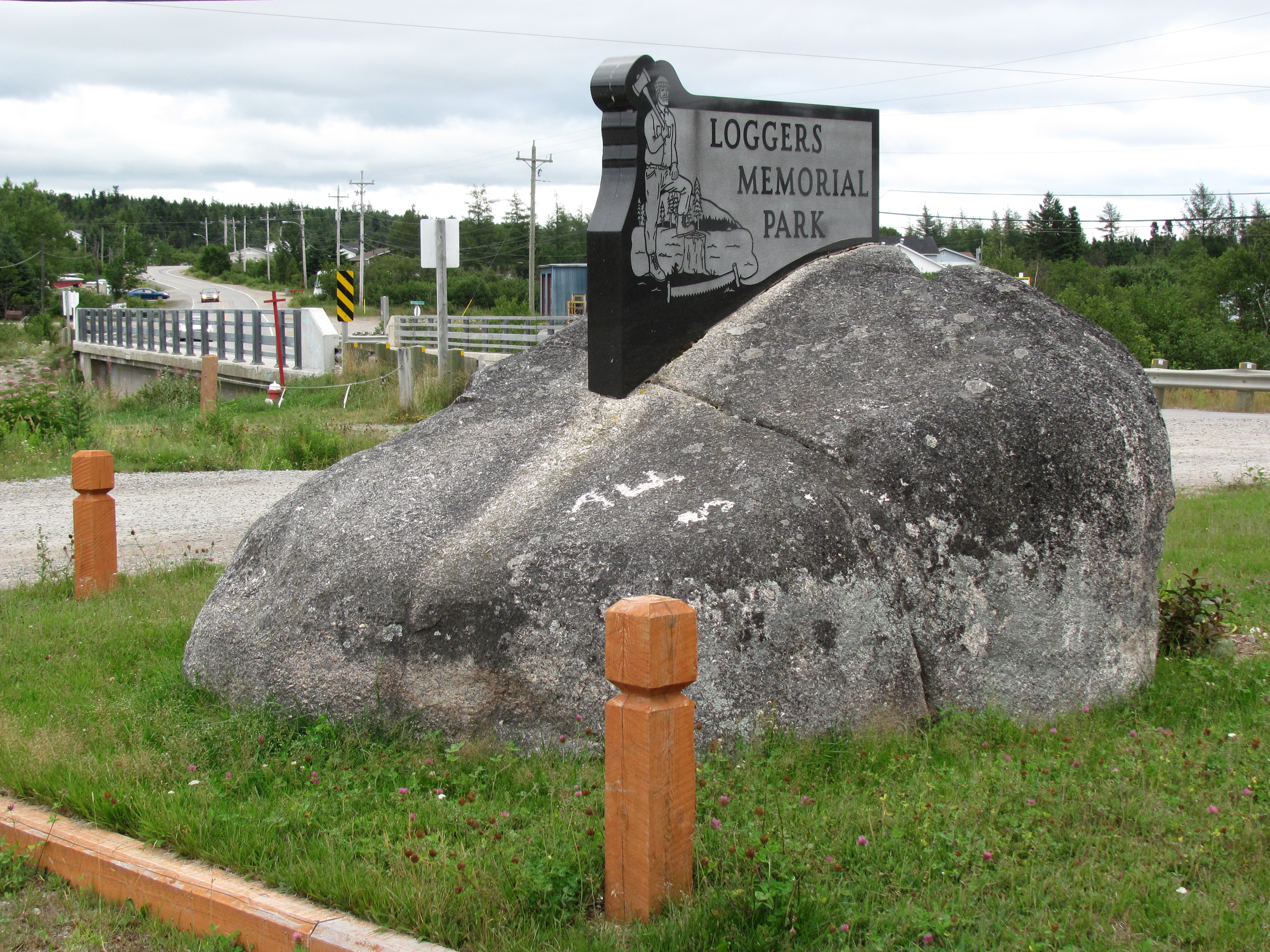
Logger's Memorial Park

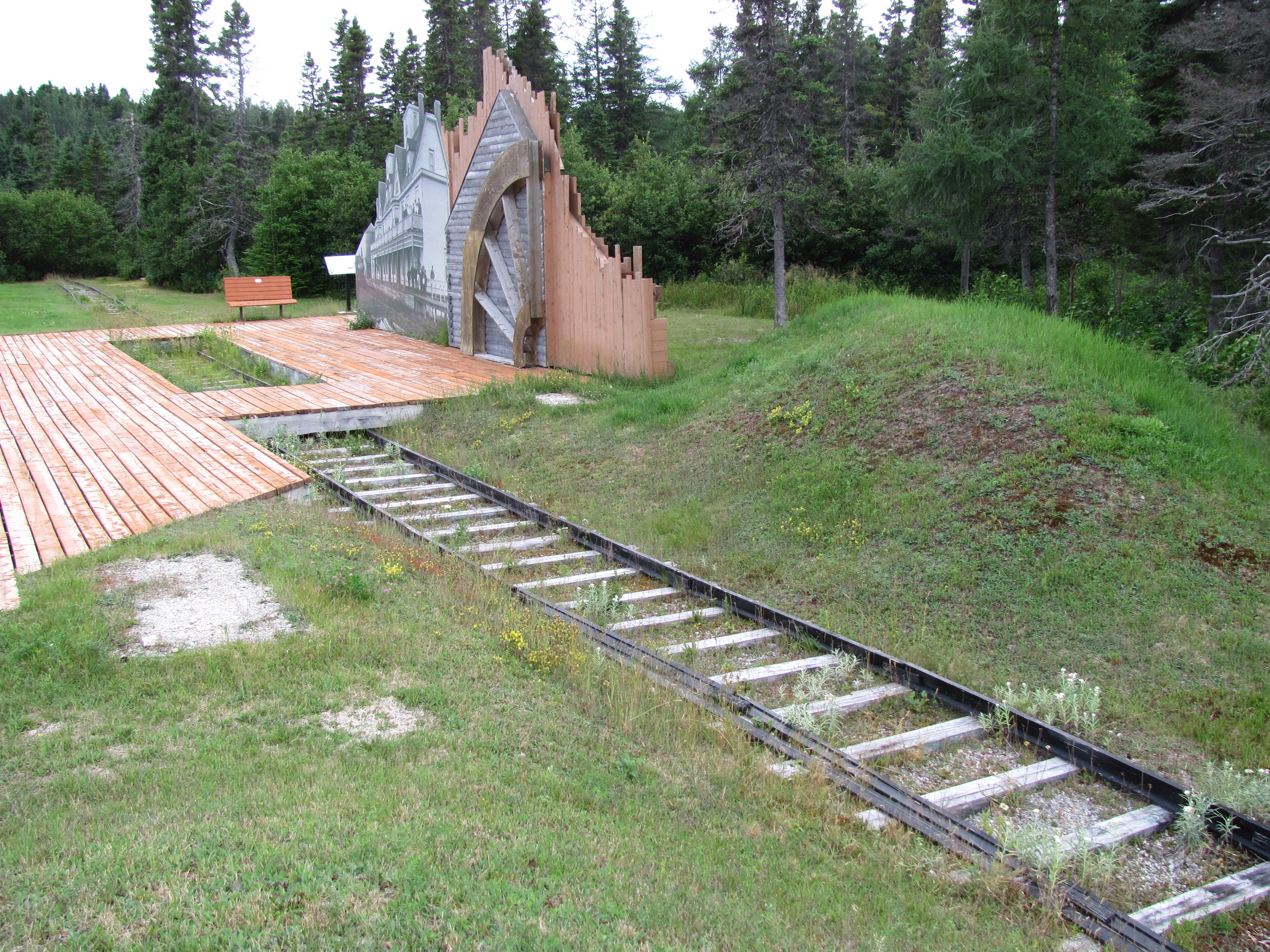
Logger's Memorial Park

== Notable people ==
- Randy Collins, member of the Newfoundland and Labrador House of Assembly
- Ursula Kelly, research professor at the Memorial University of Newfoundland
- Tom Lush, member of the Newfoundland and Labrador House of Assembly
- Peg Norman, documentary filmmaker
- Tara Nova, drag performer and Canada's Drag Race contestant
- Joey Smallwood, first premier of Newfoundland and Labrador

== See also ==
- List of cities and towns in Newfoundland and Labrador
- List of communities in Newfoundland and Labrador
- List of designated places in Newfoundland and Labrador
