= Indian Bay =

Coordinates: 49.033°N 53.867°W

Indian Bay Parsons Point, Northwest Arm
- Town
- Interactive map of Indian Bay
- Country: Canada
- Province: Newfoundland and Labrador

Population (2021)
  - Total: 172
- Time zone: UTC-3:30 (Newfoundland Time)
  - Summer (DST): UTC-2:30 (Newfoundland Daylight)
- Area code: 709
- Highways: Route 320

Indian Bay (Parsons Point) is located in Newfoundland, Canada.

== Geography ==
Situated on the northwest arm of Bonavista Bay, Indian Bay was until the late 19th century the only mainland community located between Salvage and Greenspond.

== History ==
Population census
Year	Pop.	±% p.a.
1845	6	—
1869	5	−0.76%
1874	4	−4.36%
1901	40	+8.90%
1961	285	+3.33%
2006	196	−0.83%
2011	174	−2.35%
2016	175	+0.11%
2021	172	−0.35%

Records show that Indian Bay was the only inhabited settlement in that region that was connected to the mainland part of the Island of Newfoundland until the 19th century. It was also known as Northwest Arm, and later for a period of time, as Parson's Point, after the surname of its first English settlers. Europeans first came to Indian Bay in the 18th century to fish for salmon. In 1720 George Skeffington was salmon fishing there and by 1786 there were eight salmon operations in the area. Permanent settlement began after 1800. The 1836 Census of Newfoundland records Indian Bay as having a population of five, William Parsons and his family. The population was slow in growing, and in 1901 there were 40 people living there. The main source of employment was three sawmills, and a lobster factory was established before 1911. In 1921 the "International Power and Paper Co." arrived in Indian Bay and that same year a school was constructed. The peak of Indian Bay's population was in 1961 with 285 people; afterwards the population began to decline.

Indian Bay is known for its sports fishing, primarily for Brook Trout and Atlantic Salmon. The community has a licensed salmon river called Indian Bay River, but locally known as, "The Brook", that runs through the town. Fishing is still a popular sport in the area and with its many ATV and Snowmobile trails (old Bowater's woods roads), Indian Bay is a popular destination for those that enjoy the great outdoors and everything it has to offer.

== Demographics ==
In the 2021 Census of Population conducted by Statistics Canada, Indian Bay had a population of 172 living in 68 of its 118 total private dwellings, a change of −1.7% from its 2016 population of 175. With a land area of 86.49 km^{2} (33.39 sq mi), it had a population density of 2.0/km^{2} (5.2/sq mi) in 2021.

== Directory ==
- Hutchinson's Newfoundland Directory 1864-1865 lists:

- Joseph Osmond, ship carpenter
- Phillip Parsons, ship carpenter

- Lovell's Newfoundland Directory describes Indian Bay as a small fishing community on the west side of Bonavista Bay, distant from Greenspond by 15 miles on boat. The 1871 population was 5. The directory lists one person:

- Adam Parsons, Fisherman.

== See also ==
- List of cities and towns in Newfoundland and Labrador
