= Jamestown, Newfoundland and Labrador =

Village in Newfoundland and Labrador

Coordinates: 48°26′30″N 53°48′00″W

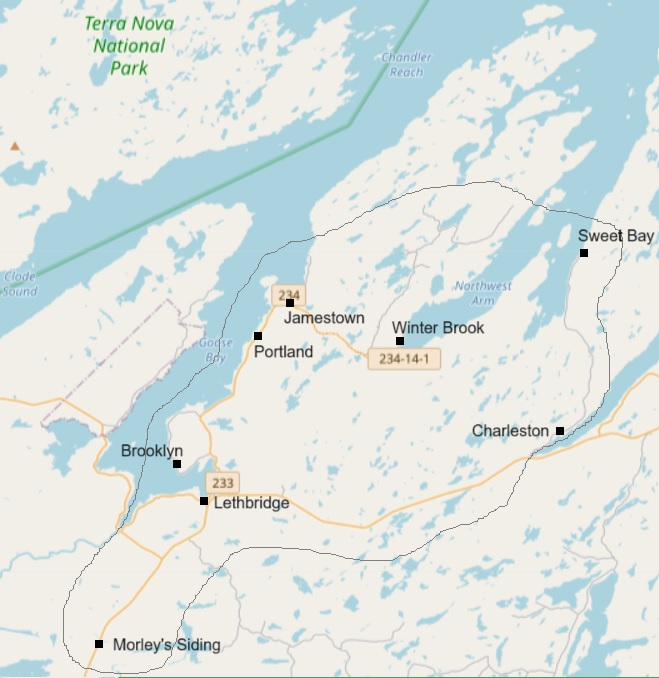

Jamestown is a village located northeast of Clarenville, Newfoundland and Labrador, Canada.

== See also ==
- List of communities in Newfoundland and Labrador
