= Badger's Quay =

Canadian town

Coordinates: 49°07′26″N 53°35′40″W

Badger's Quay is a neighborhood located within the Town of New-Wes-Valley in Newfoundland and Labrador.

Located on Bonavista Bay, it had a population of 611 in 1956. Its name was referred to as Badger's Bay in early census data. The name "badger" probably named after the community of Badger in Shropshire, England. Badger's Quay is not to be confused with the town of Badger, an inland lumbering community which was named after a river that was thought to flow into Badgers Bay.

Population: 3,061, (includes Newtown and Wesleyville, 1996)

Early Settlement: Area was visited by land based seal fishermen and inshore cod fishermen from the late 18th century to the early 19th century. Settlement in the area began on Fool's Island (now known as Pool's Island), when the first settlers were English fishermen who came to the area in the early 19th century via Bonavista.

Employment: While the inshore fishery and sealing have been the traditional industries, more recently government services, self-employment, tourism and the service industry have diversified the economy.

== History ==
Badger's Quay, Newfoundland was first recorded in the 1891 Census of Newfoundland. Its population consisted mainly of people moving in from surrounding areas such as Pool's Island. In 1891, Badger's Key, as it was called, had 87 inhabitants. The land-based seal hunt and Labrador seal hunt were the primary factors for settling in Badger's Quay and the communities around it. In the 1950s the Straight Shore highroad passed through Badger's Quay thus centralizing the communities services. By 1955 nineteen families had moved there from Safe Harbour due to the Centralization Program by the government. Badger's Quay was incorporated with Valleyfield, Pool's Island, and other areas in 1946. In 1980 the rural district of Badger's Quay-Valleyfield-Pool's Island was created as a town. By 1981 all islands and coastlines were connected by bridges, most of their roads were paved, and the town had a governing town council. The latest amalgamation, in 1992, has put the community into the Town of New-Wes-Valley.

== Church history ==
There was a Church of England school established in Badger's Quay by 1901. New schools were later built to accommodate the Anglican and United Church families. By the 1950s there was a small Pentecostal population.

== Interesting facts ==
- In the 1880s Badger's Quay had a ferryman by the name of John Abbott.

== See also ==
- List of communities in Newfoundland and Labrador
- Bonavista Bay
