= Bonavista Bay =

Bay in Newfoundland and Labrador, Canada

Coordinates: 48°45′00″N 53°29′57″W

Location of Bonavista Bay in Newfoundland

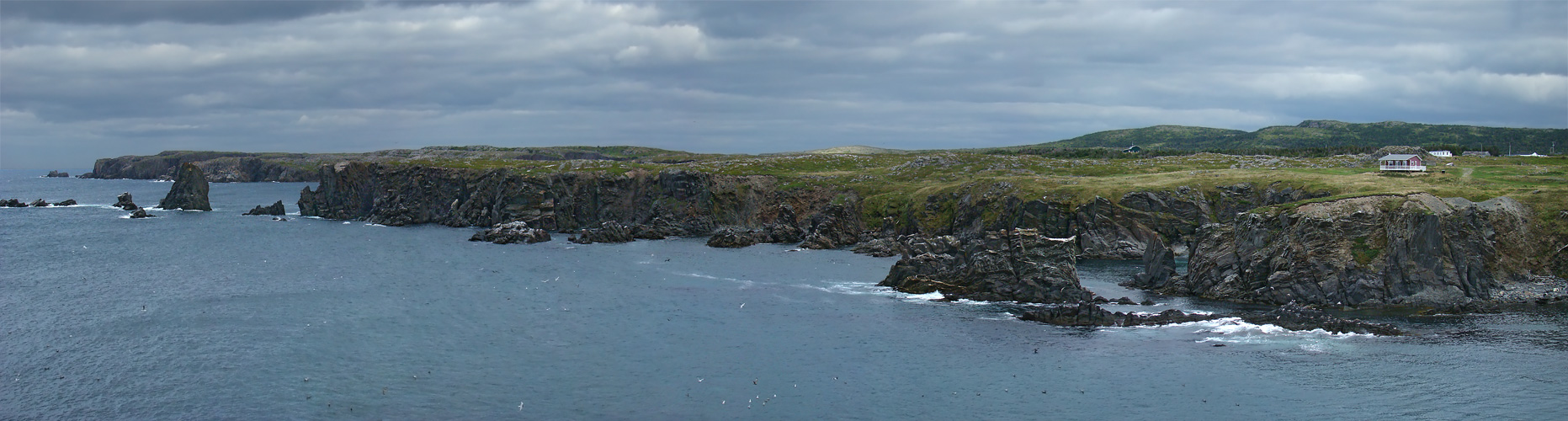
Cape Bonavista on the shore of Bonavista Bay

Bonavista Bay (sometimes abbreviated BB) is a large bay located on the northeast coast of the island of Newfoundland in the province of Newfoundland and Labrador in Canada. It opens directly onto the Atlantic Ocean.

The bay is demarcated by Cape Freels to the north and Cape Bonavista to the south. Cape Bonavista is also the eastern limit of the Bonavista Peninsula, which forms the bay's southern shore. The topography of the central western shore of the bay is composed of numerous channels and islands. This area also hosts Terra Nova National Park.

Bonavista Bay contains many densely forested islands, which divide its waters between the exposed outer bay and the nearly landlocked inner bay. The outer bay regularly receives water colder than −1 °C and the occasional iceberg from the Labrador Current. However, the sheltered inner bay is warm enough for lobster to reproduce.

The smaller communities in Newfoundland may often be referenced by the Bay in which they are located, e.g., "Wesleyville, BB".

== Fishing communities ==
- Newtown
- Wesleyville
- Badger's Quay
- Valleyfield
- North West Arm
- Centreville
- Trinity
- Dover
- Hare Bay
- Gambo
- Glovertown
- Eastport
- Port Blandford
- Musgravetown
- Summerville
- Keels
- Bonavista

The bay has a small ferry operated by the provincial government providing service from Burnside to St. Brendan's on Cottel's Island.
