= Department of Tourism, Culture, Arts and Recreation =

Government department in Canada

Agency overview
- Formed: October 28, 2011
- Preceding agencies: Innovation, Business and Rural Development; Department of Business; Tourism, Culture and Recreation; Tourism, Culture, Industry and Innovation
- Jurisdiction: Newfoundland and Labrador
- Headquarters: St. John's
- Minister responsible: Mike Goosney
- Website: www.gov.nl.ca/tcar/

The Ministry of Tourism, Culture, Arts and Recreation is a provincial government department in Newfoundland and Labrador, Canada. The department is headed by a member of the provincial cabinet, typically a Member of the House of Assembly, who is chosen by the premier and formally appointed by the Lieutenant-Governor of Newfoundland and Labrador. The current Minister of Tourism, Culture, and Arts is Mike Goosney.

The department was first created in October 2011, by the government of Kathy Dunderdale, it incorporated the former Department of Innovation, Trade and Rural Development and most of the programs from the former Department of Business. The department's lines of business included; business investment, business leadership, economic intelligence, industrial diversification, innovation, investment development, marketing, regulatory environment reform, and small and medium-sized enterprise development.

The department was reconfigured in 2017 as the department of Tourism, Culture, Industry and Innovation consolidating the former departments of Industry, Innovation, and Rural Development; and Business, Tourism, Culture and Rural Development. The department is responsible for tourism, business investment, heritage, provincial parks, and the arts.

The department was reconfigured in 2020 as the department of Tourism, Culture, Arts and Recreation.

== Ministers ==
Key:

Progressive Conservative Party
Liberal Party

No.	Name	Term of office		Political party	Premier
Minister of Tourism (1973–1980)
1	Thomas Doyle	April 2, 1973	October 7, 1974	Progressive Conservative	Frank Moores
2	Tom Hickey	October 7, 1974	February 6, 1978	Progressive Conservative	Frank Moores
3	Jim Morgan	February 6, 1978	March 27, 1979	Progressive Conservative	Frank Moores
4	Charlie Power	March 27, 1979	January 17, 1980	Progressive Conservative	Brian Peckford
Minister of Tourism, Recreation, and Culture (1980–1982)
5	Ron Dawe	January 17, 1980	March 31, 1981	Progressive Conservative	Brian Peckford
6	Hal Andrews	March 31, 1981	May 7, 1982	Progressive Conservative	Brian Peckford
Minister of Culture, Recreation, and Youth (1982–1989)
7	Len Simms	May 7, 1982	October 2, 1984	Progressive Conservative	Brian Peckford
8	Tom Rideout	October 2, 1984	April 24, 1985	Progressive Conservative	Brian Peckford
9	Bill Matthews	April 24, 1985	January 9, 1988	Progressive Conservative	Brian Peckford
10	John Butt	January 9, 1988	March 27, 1989	Progressive Conservative	Brian Peckford
Minister of Cultural Affairs, Tourism, and Historic Resources (1989)
11	Jim Hodder	March 27, 1989	May 5, 1989	Progressive Conservative	Tom Rideout
Minister Responsible for Historical Resources, Cultural Affairs, and Youth (1989–1992)
12	Eric Gullage	May 5, 1989	February 12, 1992	Liberal	Clyde Wells
Minister of Tourism and Cultural Affairs (1992–1994)
13	Jim Walsh	July 17, 1992	August 26, 1994	Liberal	Clyde Wells
Minister of Tourism, Culture, and Recreation (1994–2014)
14	Roger Grimes	August 26, 1994	March 14, 1996	Liberal	Clyde Wells
15	Sandra Kelly	March 14, 1996	December 15, 1998	Liberal	Brian Tobin
16	Chuck Furey	December 15, 1998	October 30, 2000	Liberal	Brian Tobin
(15)	Sandra Kelly (acting)	October 30, 2000	February 13, 2001	Liberal	Beaton Tulk
17	Kevin Aylward	February 13, 2001	April 4, 2002	Liberal	Roger Grimes
18	Julie Bettney	April 4, 2002	November 6, 2003	Liberal	Roger Grimes
19	Paul Shelley	November 6, 2003	November 8, 2005	Progressive Conservative	Danny Williams
20	Tom Hedderson	November 8, 2005	October 30, 2007	Progressive Conservative	Danny Williams
21	Clyde Jackman	October 30, 2007	November 27, 2009	Progressive Conservative	Danny Williams
22	Terry French	November 27, 2009	October 28, 2011	Progressive Conservative	Kathy Dunderdale
23	Derrick Dalley	October 28, 2011	October 9, 2013	Progressive Conservative	Kathy Dunderdale
24	Charlene Johnson	October 9, 2013	January 29, 2014	Progressive Conservative	Kathy Dunderdale
(22)	Terry French	January 29, 2014	May 1, 2014	Progressive Conservative	Tom Marshall
25	Sandy Collins	May 1, 2014	July 17, 2014	Progressive Conservative	Tom Marshall
26	Tony Cornect	July 17, 2014	September 30, 2014	Progressive Conservative	Tom Marshall
Minister of Business, Tourism, and Cultural Development (2014–2017)
27	Darin King	September 30, 2014	December 14, 2015	Progressive Conservative	Paul Davis
28	Chris Mitchelmore	December 14, 2015	February 22, 2017	Liberal	Dwight Ball
Minister of Tourism, Industry, and Innovation (2017)
(28)	Chris Mitchelmore	February 22, 2017	July 31, 2017	Liberal	Dwight Ball
Minister of Tourism, Culture, Industry, and Innovation (2017–2020)
(28)	Chris Mitchelmore	July 31, 2017	September 6, 2019	Liberal	Dwight Ball
29	Bernard Davis	September 6, 2019	August 19, 2020	Liberal	Dwight Ball
Minister of Tourism, Culture, Arts, and Recreation (2020–2025)
(29)	Bernard Davis	August 19, 2020	April 8, 2021	Liberal	Andrew Furey
30	Steve Crocker	April 8, 2021	May 9, 2025	Liberal	Andrew Furey
31	Fred Hutton	May 9, 2025	October 29, 2025	Liberal	John Hogan
Minister of Tourism, Culture, and Arts (2025–present)
32	Andrea Barbour	October 29, 2025	August 20, 2026	Progressive Conservative	Tony Wakeham
33	Mike Goosney	August 20, 2026	Incumbent	Progressive Conservative	Tony Wakeham

== See also ==
- Executive Council of Newfoundland and Labrador
