= Hogan ministry =

Former government cabinet of Newfoundland and Labrador (May-October 2025)

- Date formed: May 9, 2025
- Date dissolved: October 29, 2025
- Premier: John Hogan

History
- Legislature term: 50th General Assembly of Newfoundland and Labrador
- Predecessor: Furey ministry
- Successor: Wakeham ministry

The Hogan ministry governed Newfoundland and Labrador in 2025.

== Background ==
John Hogan became Premier of Newfoundland and Labrador after winning the leadership election following the resignation of Andrew Furey.

== Ministers ==
Lieutenant Governor
Her Honour The Honourable Joan Marie Aylward	(2023–present)
Portfolio	Minister
Premier of Newfoundland and Labrador President of Executive Council Minister for Intergovernmental Affairs	John Hogan
Deputy Premier Minister of Finance President of Treasury Board Minister Responsible for the Public Service Commission Minister Responsible for the Newfoundland and Labrador Liquor Corporation	Siobhan Coady
Minister of Justice and Public Safety Attorney General Minister Responsible for Access to Information and Protection of Privacy Office Deputy Government House Leader	John Haggie
Minister of Jobs, Immigration and Growth	Gerry Byrne
Minister of Industry, Energy and Technology Minister Responsible for Trade Opportunities	Steve Crocker
Minister of Fisheries, Forestry and Agriculture Minister of Labrador Affairs Government House Leader	Lisa Dempster
Minister of Education and Early Childhood Development Minister of Families and Affordability Minister Responsible for the Status of Persons with Disabilities Minister Responsible for the Community Sector	Bernard Davis
Minister of Transportation and Infrastructure Minister Responsible for the Public Procurement Agency	Elvis Loveless
Minister of Seniors Minister Responsible for Newfoundland and Labrador Housing Corporation	Jamie Korab
Minister of Health and Community Services Minister Responsible for Mental Health and Addictions Minister Responsible for Newfoundland and Labrador Health Services	Krista Lynn Howell
Minister of Minister of Tourism, Culture, Arts and Recreation	Fred Hutton
Minister Responsible for Women and Gender Equality	Sherry Gambin-Walsh
Minister of Municipal Affairs and Community Engagement Registrar General	Paul Pike
Minister Responsible for Indigenous Affairs and Reconciliation Minister of Environment and Climate Change	Scott Reid
Minister of Government Modernization and Service Delivery Minister Responsible for the Office of the Chief Information Officer Minister Responsible for Francophone Affairs	Sarah Stoodley
Minister of Rural Economic Development Minister of Labour Minister Responsible for Workplace Newfoundland and Labrador	Pam Parsons
