= 2025 Liberal Party of Newfoundland and Labrador leadership election =

Canadian provincial party leadership race

- May 2–3, 2025
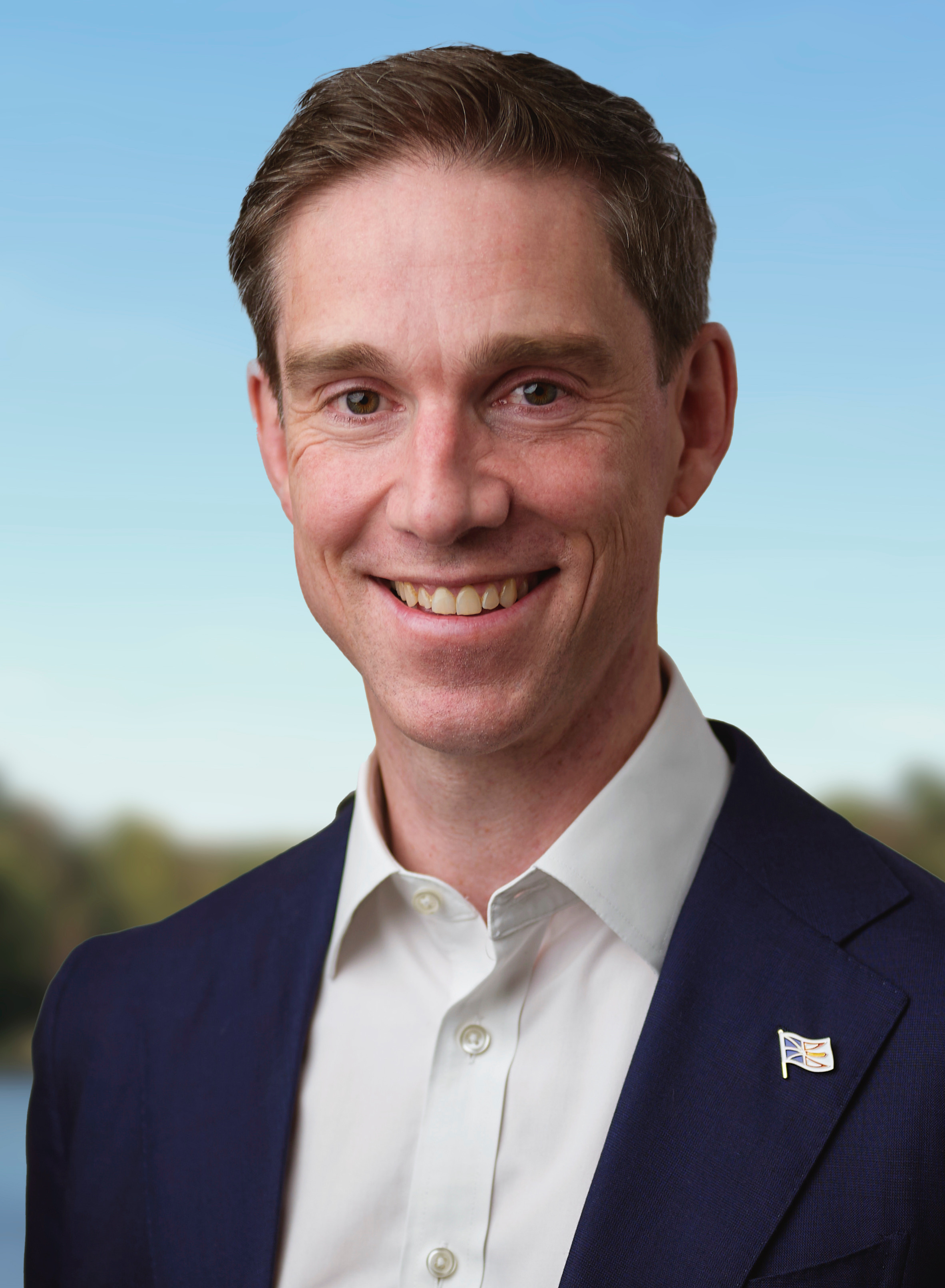
| | | JA |
| Candidate | John Hogan | John Abbott |
| Results | 77.48% | 22.52% |
Leader before election
Andrew Furey
Leader after election
John Hogan

2025 Liberal Party of Newfoundland and Labrador leadership election
- Date: May 2–3, 2025
- Convention: JAG Soundhouse, St. John's
- Resigning leader: Andrew Furey
- Won by: John Hogan
- Ballots: 1
- Candidates: 2
- Entrance fee: $50,000
- Spending limit: $200,000

The 2025 Liberal Party of Newfoundland and Labrador leadership election was held between May 2 and 3, 2025, to select a successor to Andrew Furey. It was triggered on February 25, 2025, after Furey announced that he would be resigning as Liberal Party leader and Premier of Newfoundland and Labrador upon the selection of his successor. John Hogan was elected the new leader and thus Premier.

== Timeline ==
- February 25, 2025 – Liberal leader and Premier Andrew Furey announces his pending resignation in a press conference.
- March 3, 2025 – The Liberal Party releases the timeline for the leadership election and officially opens nominations.
- March 4, 2025 – Housing minister John Abbott announces his candidacy.
- March 6, 2025 – Health minister John Hogan announces his candidacy.
- March 24, 2025 – Deadline for candidates to be nominated.
- March 31, 2025 – Deadline for voters to register with the provincial Liberal Party and be eligible to vote in the convention.
- April 13, 2025 – A leadership debate was hosted by NTV News.
- April 23, 2025 – A leadership debate was hosted by CBC News' Here & Now.
- May 2–3, 2025 – The leadership convention is set to be held in St. John's.
- May 3, 2025 – John Hogan was elected leader and Premier of Newfoundland and Labrador.

== Candidates ==
=== Declared ===
==== John Abbott ====
John Abbott: MHA for St. John's East-Quidi Vidi (2021–2025), Minister of Housing and Minister of Mental Health and Addictions (2024–2025), leadership candidate in 2020, Deputy Minister of Health under Premiers Danny Williams and Dwight Ball.

Date campaign launched: March 4, 2025

==== John Hogan ====
John Hogan: MHA for Windsor Lake (2021–present), Minister of Health and Community Services (2024–2025).

Date campaign launched: March 6, 2025

=== Declined ===
- Paul Antle, St. John's businessman, leadership candidate in 2013, federal Liberal candidate in St. John's East (2006)
- Gerry Byrne, Minister of Fisheries, Forestry, and Agriculture and Minister Responsible for the Public Procurement Agency (2024–2025), MHA for Corner Brook (2015–2025), MP for Humber—St. Barbe—Baie Verte (1996–2015) (endorsed Hogan)
- Steve Crocker, Minister of Tourism, Culture, Arts and Recreation (2021–2025), MHA for Carbonear-Trinity-Bay de Verde (2014–2025) (endorsed Hogan)
- Siobhán Coady, Deputy Premier of Newfoundland and Labrador and Minister of Finance (2020–2025), MHA for St. John's West (2015–2025), MP for St. John's South—Mount Pearl (2008–2011) (endorsed Hogan)
- Bernard Davis, Minister of Justice and Public Safety and Minister Responsible for the Access to Information and Protection of Privacy Office (2024–2025), MHA for Virginia Waters-Pleasantville (2015–present), St. John's City Councillor for Ward 4 (2013–2015) (endorsed Hogan)
- Yvonne Jones, MP for Labrador (2013–2025), Leader of the Liberal Party of Newfoundland and Labrador (2007–2011), MHA for Cartwright-L'Anse au Clair (1996–2013), Mayor of Mary's Harbour (1991–1996) (endorsed Hogan)
- Brian Keating, Mayor of Marystown (2021–2025)
- Andrew Parsons, Minister of Industry, Energy and Technology (2020–2025), MHA for Burgeo-La Poile (2011–2025) (endorsed Hogan)

== Endorsements ==
John Abbott

MHAs

- Lisa Dempster, MHA for Cartwright-L'Anse au Clair (2013–present)
- Scott Reid, MHA for St. George's-Humber (2014–2025)
- Sarah Stoodley, MHA for Mount Scio (2019–present)
- Lucy Stoyles, MHA for Mount Pearl North (2021–present)
- Perry Trimper, MHA for Lake Melville (2015–2025)
- Sherry Gambin-Walsh, MHA for Placentia-St. Mary's (2015–present)
John Hogan

MHAs

- Gerry Byrne, MHA for Corner Brook (2015–2025)
- Siobhán Coady, MHA for St. John's West (2015–2025)
- Steve Crocker, MHA for Carbonear-Trinity-Bay de Verde (2014–2025)
- Bernard Davis, MHA for Virginia Waters-Pleasantville (2015–present)
- John Haggie, MHA for Gander (2015-2025)
- Krista Howell, MHA for St. Barbe-L'Anse aux Meadows (2021–2025)
- Fred Hutton, MHA for Conception Bay East - Bell Island (2024–present)
- Jamie Korab, MHA for Waterford Valley (2024–present)
- Elvis Loveless, MHA for Fortune Bay-Cape La Hune (2019–present)
- Andrew Parsons, MHA for Burgeo-La Poile (2011–2025)
- Pam Parsons, MHA for Harbour Grace-Port de Grave (2015–present)
- Paul Pike, MHA for Burin-Grand Bank (2021–present)

MPs

- Yvonne Jones, MP for Labrador (2013–2025)

== Results ==
Results
| Candidate | First ballot |
| Name | Percentage |
|---|---|
| John Hogan | 77.48% |
| John Abbott | 22.52% |
| Total | 9,895 votes cast |
