= 2020 Liberal Party of Newfoundland and Labrador leadership election =

Canadian provincial party leadership race

- August 3, 2020
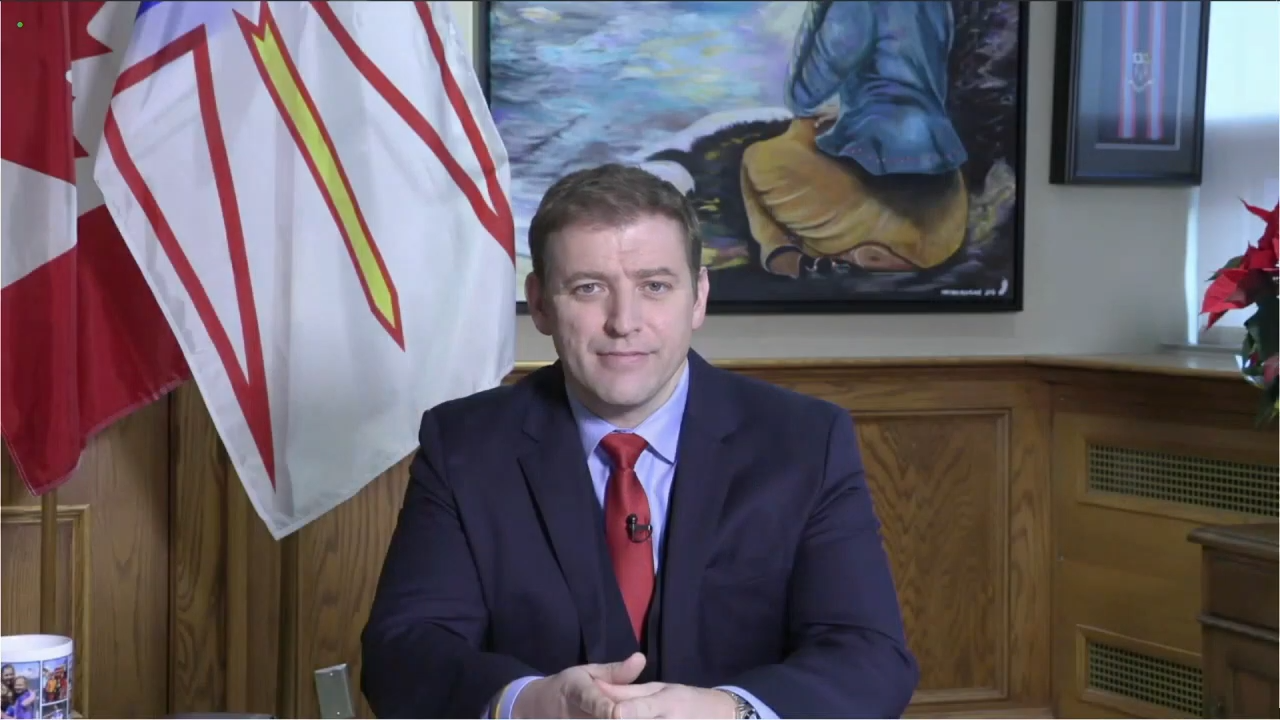
		JA
Candidate	Andrew Furey	John Abbott
Results	13,645 (64.42%)	7,537 (35.58%)
Leader before election
Dwight Ball
Leader after election
Andrew Furey

2020 Liberal Party of Newfoundland and Labrador leadership election
- Date: August 3, 2020
- Convention: St. John's, NL
- Resigning leader: Dwight Ball
- Won by: Andrew Furey
- Ballots: 1
- Candidates: 2
- Entrance fee: $25,000
- Spending limit: none

The 2020 Liberal Party of Newfoundland and Labrador leadership election was held due to the announcement by Dwight Ball on February 17, 2020 that he would be resigning as Liberal Party leader and Premier of Newfoundland and Labrador effective when the party elects his successor. Provincial legislation requires that a general election must occur no more than one year following a Premier's resignation.

The leadership campaign was suspended on March 23, 2020 at noon due to the COVID-19 pandemic in Newfoundland and Labrador. The party's leadership election committee met on May 25, 2020, announcing that the race would resume on June 8, 2020. A virtual convention was held on August 3, 2020, at which Andrew Furey was elected leader.

== Timeline ==
- 17 February 2020 - Liberal leader and Premier Dwight Ball informs Liberal Party president John Allan of his resignation as party leader and premier, to take effect when the Liberal Party chooses his successor. Ball subsequently announces his decision to the province in a pre-taped video.
- 18 February 2020 - Liberal board of directors meets to make decisions on the process to replace Ball.
- 24 February 2020 - Liberal Party releases leadership election rules, official opening of nomination period.
- 6 March 2020, noon - deadline for candidates to be nominated ($25,000 deposit and 50 signatures from 10 provincial electoral districts required).
- 18 March 2020 - the executive announced that due to the COVID-19 pandemic in Canada, the physical leadership convention would be cancelled and the vote would proceed entirely online.
- 23 March 2020 - The party executive announced that the leadership campaign has been suspended effective at noon due to the COVID-19 pandemic. The party executive is to meet on 1 May 2020 to decide whether the race can resume or whether it and/or the election will be postponed.
- 4 April 2020 - original deadline to become a party member or renew party membership so that one can be able to vote in the leadership election.
- 1 May 2020 - Party releases a press release stating that the leadership election committee will meet on May 11, 2020, to determine whether the suspension of the leadership election will be lifted.
- 8 May 2020 - leadership convention was to have opened (cancelled).
- 9 May 2020 - original date leadership vote was scheduled to occur by preferential ballot.
- 11 May 2020 - leadership election committee meets to determine whether the suspension of the election can be lifted and, if so, determine a new schedule. It announces that the race remains suspended and that the situation will be reviewed again on 25 May.
- 25 May 2020 - the leadership election committee announces that the race will resume on 8 June. No schedule was determined.
- 1 June 2020 - the Liberal party formally informs the candidates that the race will resume the following week, and announces that the results will be revealed at a virtual convention on 3 August.
- 8 June 2020 - Campaigning resumes.
- 21 June 2020 - NTV News hosted a virtual town hall debate with Abbott and Furey.
- 25 June 2020 - CBC NL hosted a debate with Abbott and Furey.
- 28 June 2020 - Deadline to become a party member or renew party membership so that one can be able to vote in the leadership election.
- 3 August 2020 - Virtual convention held. Andrew Furey elected leader.

== Declared candidates ==
=== John Abbott ===
CEO of the Newfoundland and Labrador branch of the Canadian Mental Health Association, Deputy Minister of Health under Premiers Danny Williams and Dwight Ball

Date campaign launched: March 5, 2020

Former MHAs: Rex Gibbons, MHA for St. John's West (1989–1997)
Other prominent individuals: Paul Antle, businessman and political candidate

=== Andrew Furey ===
Philanthropist and orthopedic surgeon, founder of Team Broken Earth, son of Senator George Furey, and nephew of former cabinet minister Chuck Furey.

Date campaign launched: March 3, 2020

MHAs: Derrick Bragg, MHA for Fogo Island-Cape Freels (2015–2024); Gerry Byrne, MHA for Corner Brook (2015-2025); Steve Crocker, MHA for Carbonear-Trinity-Bay de Verde (2014–2025); Sherry Gambin-Walsh, MHA for Placentia-St. Mary's (2015–present); John Haggie, MHA for Gander (2015-2025); Eddie Joyce, MHA for Humber-Bay of Islands (2011-present); Andrew Parsons, MHA for Burgeo-La Poile (2011–2025); Pam Parsons, MHA for Harbour Grace-Port de Grave (2015–present)
Former party leaders: Brian Tobin, Premier of Newfoundland and Labrador (1996–2000)
Former MHAs: Graham Letto, MHA for Labrador West (2015–2019)
Other prominent supporters: Jamie Fowlow, CEO of the Western Regional Hospital Foundation; Brendan Paddick, Chair of the Board of Directors at Nalcor Energy

== Declined ==
- Paul Antle - St. John's businessman, federal Liberal candidate in St. John's East (2006), runner-up in 2013 Liberal Party of Newfoundland and Labrador leadership election (endorsed John Abbott)
- Bernard Davis - Minister of Tourism, Culture, Industry (2019–present), MHA for Virginia Waters-Pleasantville (2015–present), St. John's City Councillor (2013–2015)
- Gerry Byrne - Minister of Fisheries and Land Resources (2017–2020), Minister of Advanced Education and Skills (2015–2017), MHA for Corner Brook (2015–2025), federal Minister of State for the Atlantic Canada Opportunities Agency (2002–2003), MP for Humber—St. Barbe—Baie Verte (1996–2015) (endorsed Andrew Furey)
- Siobhán Coady - Minister of Natural Resources (2015–2025), MHA for St. John's West (2015–2025), MP for St. John's South—Mount Pearl (2008–2011)
- Steve Crocker - Minister of Transportation and Works (2017–2020), Minister of Fisheries (2015–2017), MHA for Carbonear-Trinity-Bay de Verde (2014–2025) (endorsed Andrew Furey)
- Lisa Dempster - Minister of Children, Seniors and Social Development (2018–2020), MHA for Cartwright-L'Anse au Clair (2013–present)
- Jamie Fowlow - CEO of the Western Regional Hospital Foundation (endorsed Andrew Furey)
- Sherry Gambin-Walsh- Minister of Service NL (2017–2020), Minister of Children, Seniors and Social Development (2016–2017), Minister of Seniors, Wellness and Social Development (2015–2016), MHA for Placentia-St. Mary's (2015–present) (endorsed Andrew Furey)
- John Haggie - Minister of Health and Community Services (2015–2022), MHA for Gander (2015–2025), surgeon (endorsed Andrew Furey)
- Carol Anne Haley - Minister Responsible for the Status of Women (2018–2020), MHA for Burin-Grand Bank (2015–2021)
- Yvonne Jones - Parliamentary Secretary to the Minister of Indigenous and Northern Affairs (2019–2025), MP for Labrador (2013–2025), Leader of the Opposition in Newfoundland and Labrador (2007–2012), former leader of the Newfoundland and Labrador Liberal Party (2007–2011), MHA for Cartwright-L'Anse au Clair (1996-2013), Mayor of Mary's Harbour (1991–1996)
- Dean MacDonald - owner of Newfoundland Growlers minor hockey team
- Christopher Mitchelmore - Minister of Advanced Education, Skills and Labour (2019–2020), Minister of Tourism, Culture, Industry and Innovation (2015–2019), MHA for St. Barbe-L'Anse aux Meadows (2015–2021)
- Seamus O'Regan - federal Minister of Natural Resources (2019–2021), federal Minister of Indigenous Services (2019), federal Minister of Veterans Affairs and Associate Minister of National Defence (2017–2019), MP for St. John's South—Mount Pearl (2015–2025), former host of CTV Canada AM (2001–2011), correspondent for CTV National News (2011–2012)
- Andrew Parsons - Minister of Justice and Attorney General (2015–2021), Government House Leader (2015–2019), MHA for Burgeo-La Poile (2011–2025) (endorsed Andrew Furey)
- Pam Parsons - MHA for Harbour Grace-Port de Grave (2015–present) (endorsed Andrew Furey)
- Sarah Stoodley - MHA for Mount Scio (2019–present)
- Brian Warr - Minister of Education and Early Childhood Development (2019–2020), MHA for Baie Verte-Green Bay (2015–2024)
- Nick Whalen - MP for St. John's East (2015–2019)

== Results ==
Furey defeated Abbott in all 40 electoral districts, with Abbott performing the best in St. John's and the surrounding regions.

Results by ballot
Candidate	Ballot 1	
Name	Votes	Points
Andrew Furey	13,645; 64.42%	26,443; 66.11%
John Abbott	7,537; 35.58%	13,557; 33.89%
Total	21,182	40,000

== See also ==
- Liberal Party of Newfoundland and Labrador leadership elections
