= John Abbott (Newfoundland and Labrador politician) =

Canadian politician (born 1956)

Minister of Seniors
- In office May 9, 2025 – August 15, 2025
- Premier: John Hogan
- Preceded by: Paul Pike
- Succeeded by: Jamie Korab

Minister of Housing and Minister of Mental Health and Addictions
- In office July 19, 2024 – March 4, 2025
- Premier: Andrew Furey
- Preceded by: Fred Hutton
- Succeeded by: John Haggie

Minister of Transportation and Infrastructure
- In office June 14, 2023 – July 19, 2024
- Premier: Andrew Furey
- Preceded by: Elvis Loveless
- Succeeded by: Fred Hutton

Minister of Children, Seniors and Social Development
- In office April 8, 2021 – June 14, 2023
- Premier: Andrew Furey
- Preceded by: Brian Warr
- Succeeded by: Paul Pike

Member of the Newfoundland and Labrador House of Assembly for St. John's East-Quidi Vidi
- In office May 18, 2021 – August 15, 2025
- Preceded by: Alison Coffin
- Succeeded by: Sheilagh O'Leary

Personal details
- Born: December 30, 1956 (age 69)
- Party: Liberal
- Occupation: Public servant

John Abbott (born December 30, 1956) is a Canadian politician who was elected to the Newfoundland and Labrador House of Assembly in the 2021 provincial election. He defeated the leader of the provincial New Democratic Party (NDP), Alison Coffin, to represent the electoral district of St. John's East-Quidi Vidi as a member of the Liberal Party of Newfoundland and Labrador.

== Background ==
Prior to being elected, Abbott served as the executive director of the Newfoundland and Labrador chapter of the Canadian Mental Health Association. Abbott was also Deputy Minister of Health in the Williams and Ball administrations.

Between 1989 and 1999, Abbott held a number of other senior positions: Assistant Secretary to the Treasury Board, Associate Deputy Minister of Health and Community Services, chairman and CEO of the Newfoundland and Labrador Housing Corporation, Deputy Minister of Works, Services and Transportation and Deputy Minister of Municipal and Provincial Affairs.

== Politics ==
In 2020, Abbott ran for the leadership of the provincial Liberal party following the pending resignation of Dwight Ball. He lost the two-way race to frontrunner Andrew Furey. Abbott subsequently ran in the 2021 provincial election as the Liberal candidate in St. John's East-Quidi Vidi and narrowly defeated incumbent MHA and provincial NDP leader Alison Coffin. Coffin filed for a recount, but it was rejected by Supreme Court Justice Donald Burrage, who argued that the evidence was not sufficient to justify the process. Abbott was subsequently sworn in as MHA on May 18, 2021.

Prior to his swearing-in, Abbott was appointed Minister of Children, Seniors and Social Development on April 8, 2021. He later became the Minister of Transportation and Infrastructure on June 14, 2023. On July 19, 2024, he was appointed as Minister of Housing and Minister of Mental Health and Addictions.

When Premier Furey announced his pending resignation in 2025, Abbott resigned his cabinet positions and ran for the Liberal leadership in the ensuing election.

On June 11, 2025, Abbott announced that he would resign his seat of St. John's East-Quidi Vidi at the end of the summer to avoid a legal battle stemming from the troubled results of the 2021 election. On August 15, 2025, Abbott resigned as MHA and Cabinet Minister.

== Election results ==
Results
Candidate	First ballot
Name	Percentage
John Hogan	77.48%
John Abbott	22.52%
Total	9,895 votes cast

2021 Newfoundland and Labrador general election: St. John's East-Quidi Vidi
Party	Candidate	Votes	%	±%
Liberal	John Abbott	2,447	42.95	+9.57
New Democratic	Alison Coffin	2,394	42.02	−1.46
Progressive Conservative	Vaughn Hammond	856	15.03	−8.11
Total valid votes		5,697	99.34	
Total rejected ballots		38	0.66	
Turnout		5,735	50.76	
Eligible voters		11,299		
Liberal gain from New Democratic		Swing		−5.52
Source(s) "Officially Nominated Candidates General Election 2021" (PDF). Elections Newfoundland and Labrador. "NL Election 2021 (Unofficial Results)".

2020 Liberal Party of Newfoundland and Labrador leadership election
Candidate	Ballot 1	
Name	Votes	Points
Andrew Furey	13,645; 64.42%	26,443; 66.11%
John Abbott	7,537; 35.58%	13,557; 33.89%
Total	21,182	40,000
