= Krista Howell =

Canadian politician

The Honourable Krista Howell ECNL

Minister of Health and Community Services
- In office May 9, 2025 – October 14, 2025
- Premier: John Hogan
- Preceded by: John Haggie
- Succeeded by: Lela Evans

Minister of Education
- In office June 14, 2023 – May 9, 2025
- Preceded by: John Haggie
- Succeeded by: Bernard Davis

Minister of Municipal and Provincial Affairs
- In office April 8, 2021 – June 14, 2023
- Preceded by: position established
- Succeeded by: John Haggie

Member of the Newfoundland and Labrador House of Assembly for St. Barbe-L'Anse aux Meadows
- In office March 25, 2021 – October 14, 2025
- Preceded by: Chris Mitchelmore
- Succeeded by: Andrea Barbour

Mayor of St. Anthony
- In office 2019–2021
- Preceded by: Desmond McDonald
- Succeeded by: Brad Johannessen

Registrar General
- In office April 8, 2021 – June 14, 2023
- Preceded by: Derek Bennett
- Succeeded by: John Haggie

Personal details
- Born: Krista Lynn Howell
- Party: Liberal
- Spouse: Felix Kojo Ayes
- Children: 1
- Occupation: Nurse

Krista Lynn Howell is a Canadian politician, who was elected to the Newfoundland and Labrador House of Assembly in the 2021 provincial election. She represents the electoral district of St. Barbe-L'Anse aux Meadows as a member of the Liberal Party of Newfoundland and Labrador. Howell became the first female mayor of St. Anthony in 2019, serving until she entered provincial politics in 2021.

On April 8, 2021, Howell was appointed Minister of Municipal and Provincial Affairs. On June 14, 2023, she was appointed Minister of Education.

In the 2025 Liberal Party of Newfoundland and Labrador leadership election, Howell endorsed John Hogan. On May 9, 2025, she was appointed Minister of Health and Community Services.

Howell lost re-election in the 2025 provincial election.

== Personal life ==
Howell is married to Felix Kojo Ayesu, a Ghanaian-Canadian who holds a PhD in Psychology from Memorial University.

== Electoral history ==
2025 Newfoundland and Labrador general election: St. Barbe-L'Anse aux Meadows
Party	Candidate	Votes	%	±%
Progressive Conservative	Andrea Barbour	2,596	55.20	+8.69
Liberal	Krista Howell	2,001	42.55	-8.62
New Democratic	Beth Ryan	106	2.25	+1.44
Total valid votes		4,703		
Total rejected ballots				
Turnout				
Eligible voters				
Progressive Conservative gain from Liberal		Swing		+8.65

2021 Newfoundland and Labrador general election: St. Barbe-L'Anse aux Meadows
Party	Candidate	Votes	%	±%
Liberal	Krista Lynn Howell	2,375	51.16	-10.00
Progressive Conservative	Sheila Fitzgerald	2,159	46.51	+10.66
Independent	Ford Mitchelmore	70	1.51	-1.48
New Democratic	John McClusky	38	0.82	
Total valid votes		4,642	99.68	
Total rejected ballots		15	0.32	
Turnout		4,657	51.30	
Eligible voters		9,078		
Liberal hold		Swing		-10.33
Source(s) "Officially Nominated Candidates General Election 2021" (PDF). Elections Newfoundland and Labrador. "NL Election 2021 (Unofficial Results)".
