= 53rd Newfoundland and Labrador general election =

Canadian provincial election

- On or before October 14, 2029

All 40 seats in the Newfoundland and Labrador House of Assembly 21 seats needed for a majority
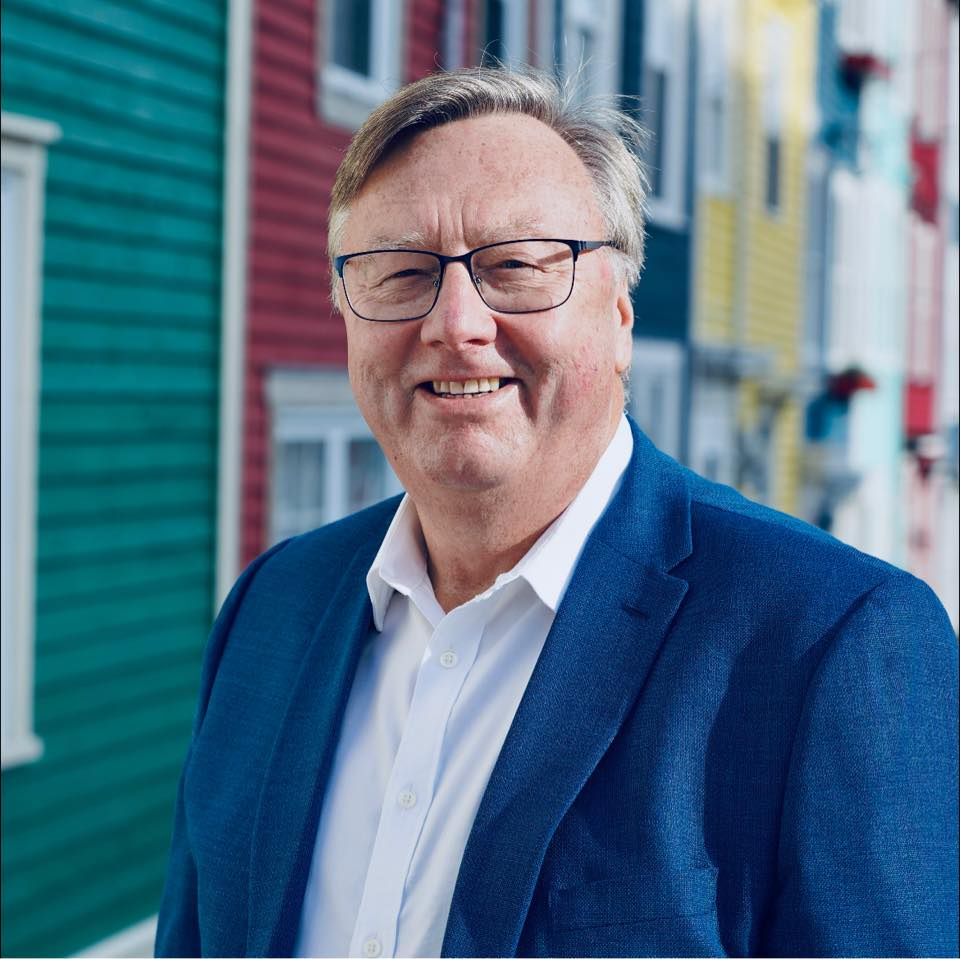

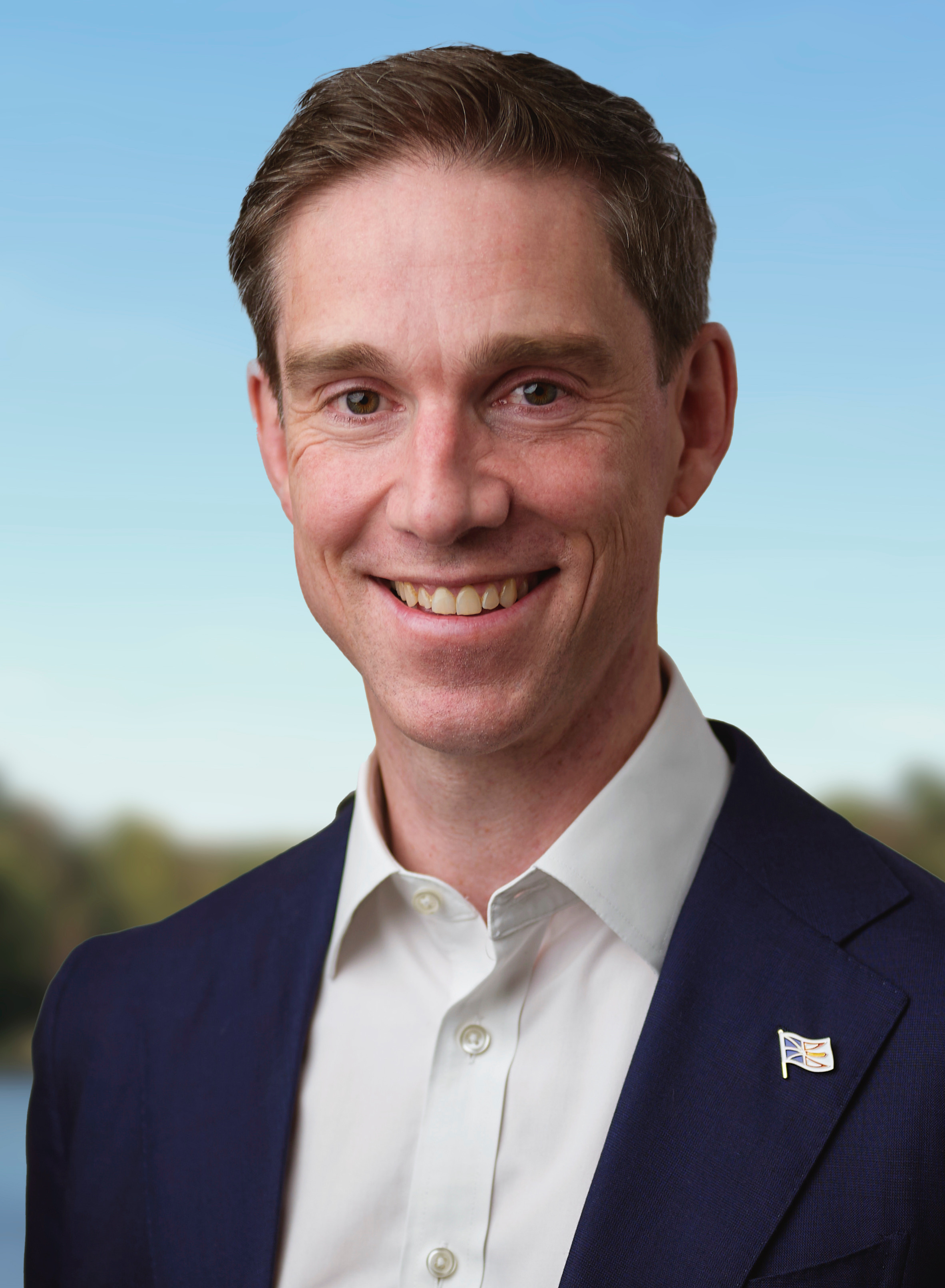

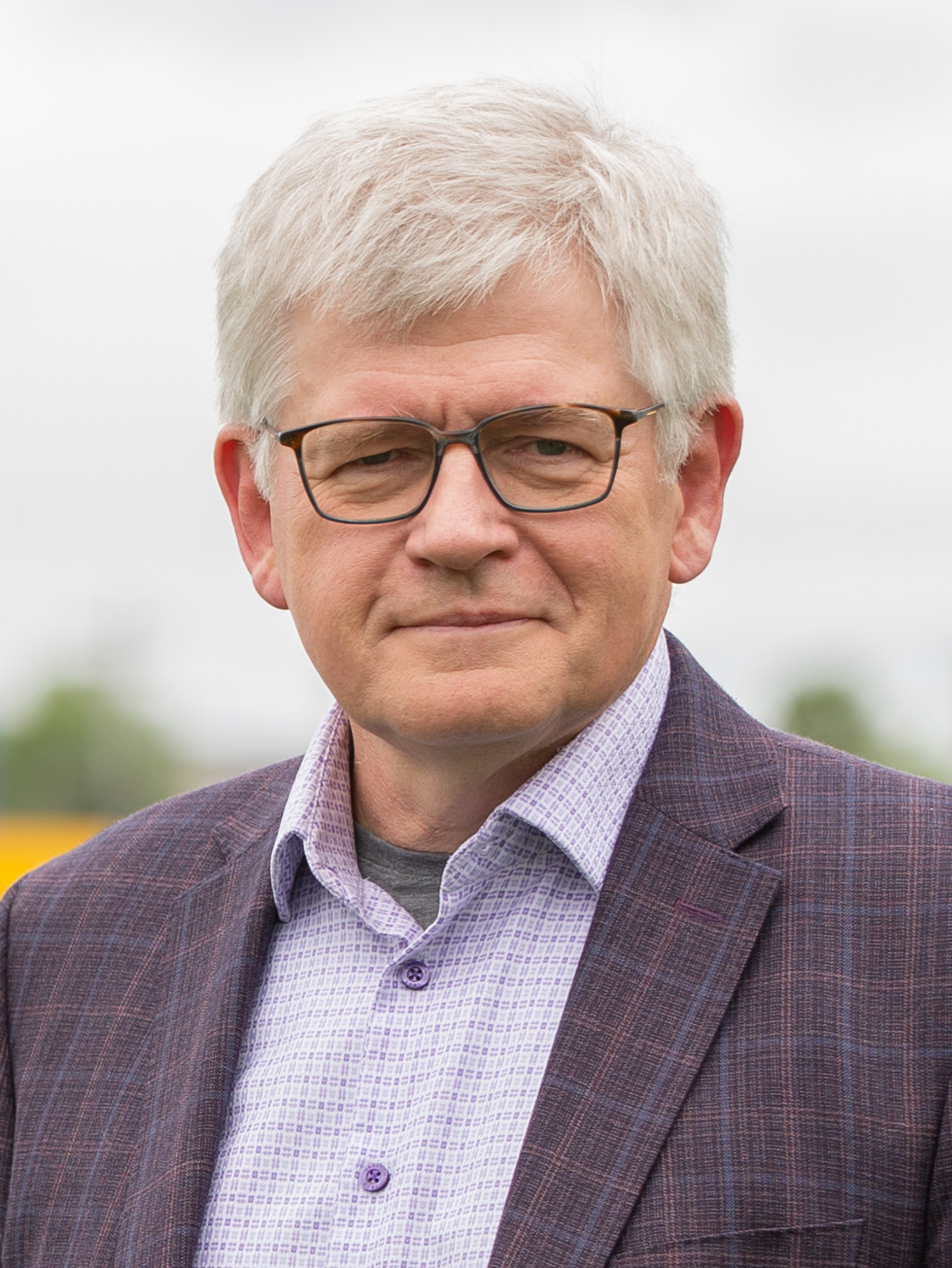
Leader	Tony Wakeham	John Hogan	Jim Dinn
Party	Progressive Conservative	Liberal	New Democratic
Leader since	October 14, 2023	May 3, 2025	October 19, 2021 (Note: On October 19, 2021, Alison Coffin resigned as leader of the NDP. The same day, Dinn would become interim leader. On March 28, 2023, Dinn was officially instated as the permanent leader of the NDP.)
Leader's seat	Stephenville-Port au Port	Windsor Lake	St. John's Centre
Last election	21 seats, 44.37%	15 seats, 43.43%	2 seats, 8.31%
Current seats	20	15	2
Incumbent Premier
Tony Wakeham
Progressive Conservative

The 53rd Newfoundland and Labrador general election will take place on or before October 14, 2029 to elect members to the 52nd General Assembly of Newfoundland and Labrador.

== Current party standings ==
Standings in the 51st General Assembly of Newfoundland and Labrador
Party	Seats
Progressive Conservative	20
Liberal	15
New Democratic	2
Independent	3

== Timeline ==
- October 14, 2025: Tony Wakeham's Progressive Conservatives win a majority government with 21 seats in 2025 Newfoundland and Labrador general election.
- October 29, 2025: The Cabinet was named and sworn in at the Government House.
- August 20, 2026: Premier Wakeham completed a major cabinet shuffle.
- September 14, 2026: Special session of the House of Assembly to debate the 2026 Churchill Falls Memorandum of Understanding.
- September 14, 2026: Lake Melville MHA Keith Russell leaves the PC caucus to sit as an independent MHA.
- September 26, 2026: NL NDP delegates vote against a leadership convention at their policy convention, with leader Jim Dinn receiving 89% support.

=== Changes in MHAs/seats held between elections ===
Changes in seats held (2025–present)
Seat	Before				Change		
Seat	Date	Member	Party	Reason	Date	Member	Party
Lake Melville	September 14, 2026	Keith Russell	█ PC	Resignation from PC caucus			█ Independent

== Opinion polling ==
Polling firm	Dates conducted	Link	PC	Liberal	NDP	Others	Margin of error	Sample size	Polling method	Lead
Narrative Research	Sep 16–28, 2026		30%	42%	25%	3%	N/A	238	Online	12%
Narrative Research	Jun 10–17, 2026		38%	37%	25%	1%	N/A	237	Online	1%
Angus Reid	Nov 26–Dec 1, 2025		43%	44%	12%	1%	±7%	179	Online	1%
