= Wakeham ministry =

Cabinet of Newfoundland and Labrador, 2025–

- Date formed: October 29, 2025
- Premier: Tony Wakeham

History
- Legislature term: 51st General Assembly of Newfoundland and Labrador
- Predecessor: Hogan ministry

The Wakeham ministry was formed following the 2025 Newfoundland and Labrador general election. Following the victory of Tony Wakeham, as the leader of the Newfoundland and Labrador Progressive Conservative Party, he formed a new cabinet (formally the Executive Council of Newfoundland and Labrador).

== Formation and shuffles ==
On October 22, 2025, Wakeham announced the members of his transition team. They included Ross Wiseman and Darin King, former public service executive Colleen Janes and PC campaign manager Steve Outhouse. Wakeham's Chief of Staff is Denise Tubrett.

On August 20, 2026, Wakeham conducted a cabinet shuffle. Seven members of his were moved.

== Ministers ==
The Cabinet was named and sworn in on October 29, 2025, at the Government House.

Lieutenant Governor
Her Honour The Honourable Joan Marie Aylward	(2023–present)
Portfolio	Minister
Premier of Newfoundland and Labrador (2025–present) President of Executive Council (2025–present) Minister for Intergovernmental Affairs (2025–present)	Tony Wakeham
Deputy Premier (2025–present): Minister of Transportation and Infrastructure (2025–present); Minister of Public Procurement (2025–present); Minister of Municipal and Community Affairs (2026–present); Minister of Community Engagement (2026–present); Deputy Government House Leader (2026–present); Registrar General (2026–present)	Barry Petten
Minister of Justice and Public Safety (2025–present); Attorney General (2025–present); Minister Emergency Preparedness and Disaster Management (2025–2026); Minister Responsible for Access to Information and Protection of Privacy Office (2025–present); Minister Responsible for the Human Rights Commission (2025–present); Minister of Women and Gender Equality (2025–2026)	Helen Conway-Ottenheimer
Minister of Immigration (2025–present); Minister of Jobs and Growth (2025–present); Minister of Rural Development (2025–present); Minister of Francophone Affairs (2025–present)	Lin Paddock
Minister of Energy and Mines (2025–present); Government House Leader (2025–present); Minister of Government Services (2026–present); Minister of Red Tape Reduction (2026–present); Minister of Labour (2026–present); Minister Responsible for Workplace NL (2026–present)	Lloyd Parrott
Minister of Forestry and Agriculture (2025–present); Minister of Crown Lands (2025–present); Minister of Emergency Preparedness and Disaster Management (2026–present) (Note: Succeeding Helen Conway-Ottenheimer on February 23, 2026)	Pleaman Forsey
Minister of Education and Early Childhood Development (2025–present); Minister of Advanced Education and Skills (2025–present)	Paul Dinn
Minister of Health and Community Services (2025–2026); Minister of Mental Health and Addictions (2025–2026); Minister Responsible for NL Health Services (2025–2026); Minister of Labrador Affairs and Indigenous Relations and Reconciliation (2025–present); Minister of Women and Gender Equality (2026–present) (Note: Appointed on February 24, 2026, succeeding Helen Conway-Ottenheimer)	Lela Evans
Minister of Housing (2025–2026); Minister of Social Supports and Well-Being (2025–2026); Minister of Poverty Reduction (2025–2026); Minister Responsible for the Status of Persons with Disabilities (2025–2026); Deputy Government House Leader (2025–2026); Minister of Health and Community Services (2026–present); Minister of Mental Health and Addictions (2026–present); Minister Responsible for NL Health Services (2026–present)	Joedy Wall
Minister of Tourism, Culture, and Arts (2025–2026); Minister of Sports, Recreation, and Parks (2025–2026); Minister Responsible for PictureNL (2025–2026); Minister Responsible for Newfoundland and Labrador Arts Council (2025–2026); Minister Responsible for the Pippy Park Commission (2025–2026); Minister of Environment, Conservation and Climate Change (2026–present); Minister Responsible for the Multi-Materials Stewardship Board (2026–present)	Andrea Barbour
Minister of Government Services (2025–2026); Minister of Labour (2025–2026); Minister Responsible for the Office of the Chief Information Officer (2025–2026); Minister Responsible for WorkplaceNL (2025–2026); Minister of Tourism, Culture and Arts (2026–present); Minister of Sport, Recreation and Parks (2026–present); Minister Responsible for PictureNL (2026–present); Minister Responsible for the Newfoundland and Labrador Arts Council (2026–present); Minister Responsible for the Pippy Park Commission (2026–present)	Mike Goosney
Minister of Municipal and Community Affairs (2025–2026); Registrar General (2025–2026); Minister of Community Engagement (2025–2026); Minister of Environment, Conservation, and Climate Change (2025–2026); Minister Responsible for Multi-Material Stewardship Board (2025–2026); Minister of Housing (2026–present); Minister of Social Supports and Well-Being (2026–present); Minister of Poverty Reduction (2026–present); Minister Responsible for the Status of Persons with Disabilities (2026–present)	Chris Tibbs
Minister of Finance (2025–present); President of Treasury Board (2025–present); Minister of Seniors (2025–present); Minister Responsible for the Public Service Commission (2025–present); Minister Responsible for the Newfoundland and Labrador Liquor Corporation (2025–present); Minister Responsible for the Office of the Chief Information Officer (2026–present)	Craig Pardy
Minister of Fisheries and Aquaculture (2025–present)	Loyola O'Driscoll
