= Chuck Furey =

Canadian teacher and politician

The Honourable Chuck Furey ECNL

MHA for St. Barbe
- In office 1985–2000
- Preceded by: Everett Osmond
- Succeeded by: Wallace Young

Personal details
- Born: March 6, 1954 (age 72) Avondale, Newfoundland and Labrador
- Party: Liberal

Charles "Chuck" Furey (born March 6, 1954) is a former Canadian politician who represented the electoral district of St. Barbe in the Newfoundland and Labrador House of Assembly from 1985 to 2000.

The son of Leo Furey and Mary Bruce, he was born in Avondale and was educated in Antigonish and later St. John's, at St. Francis Xavier University and at Memorial University. In 1978, Furey married Diane Baird. Before entering politics, he was a high school teacher.

Furey served in the Newfoundland cabinet as Minister of Industry, Trade and Technology; as Minister of Mines and Energy; as Minister of Development and Tourism; and as Minister of Tourism, Culture, and Recreation.

He sat as a member of the Newfoundland and Labrador Liberal Party caucus. He resigned from the legislature in 2000 to run as a federal Liberal Party candidate in St. John's West in the 2000 federal election, but lost to Loyola Hearn.

He was subsequently appointed as chief electoral officer of Newfoundland and Labrador in February 2006, and served until May 2007.

Furey is the uncle of Andrew Furey who, in 2020, was elected leader of the Liberal Party of Newfoundland and Labrador.
