= Bernard Davis (politician) =

Canadian politician

The Honourable Bernard Davis ECNL MHA
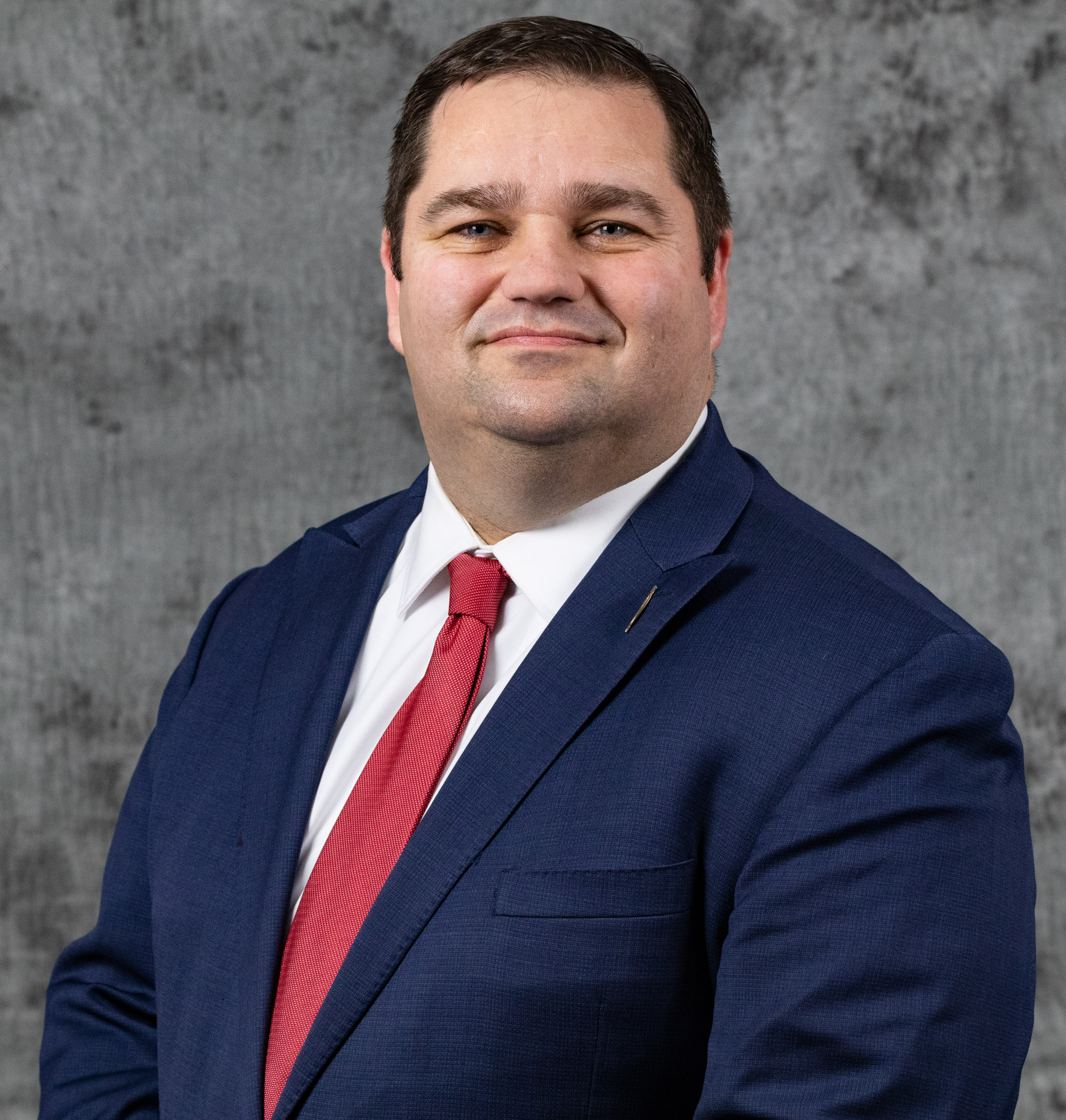

Minister of Advanced Education, Skills and Labour
- In office November 8, 2018 – September 6, 2019
- Preceded by: Al Hawkins
- Succeeded by: Christopher Mitchelmore

Minister of Families and Affordability
- In office August 15, 2025 – October 14, 2025
- Preceded by: Jamie Korab
- Succeeded by: Joedy Wall

Minister of Education and Early Childhood Development
- In office May 9, 2025 – October 14, 2025
- Preceded by: Krista Lynn Howell
- Succeeded by: Paul Dinn

Minister of Justice and Public Safety
- In office July 19, 2024 – May 9, 2025
- Preceded by: John Hogan
- Succeeded by: John Haggie

Minister of Environment and Climate Change
- In office April 8, 2021 – July 19, 2024
- Preceded by: Derek Bennett
- Succeeded by: Lisa Dempster

Minister of Tourism, Culture, Arts, and Recreation
- In office September 6, 2019 – April 8, 2021
- Preceded by: Chris Mitchelmore
- Succeeded by: Steve Crocker

Member of the Newfoundland and Labrador House of Assembly for Virginia Waters-Pleasantville
- Incumbent
- Assumed office November 30, 2015
- Preceded by: Riding Established

St. John's City Councillor
- In office 2013–2015
- Preceded by: Debbie Hanlon
- Succeeded by: Sheilagh O'Leary
- Constituency: Ward 4

Personal details
- Party: Liberal

Bernard "Bernie" Davis is a Canadian politician, who was elected to the Newfoundland and Labrador House of Assembly in the 2015 provincial election. He represents the electoral district of Virginia Waters-Pleasantville as a member of the Liberal Party. He previously served on the St. John's City Council, having run unsuccessfully in 2008 and 2009, before being elected in 2013.

== Cabinet Minister ==
On November 8, 2018, Davis was appointed Minister of Advanced Education, Skills and Labour in the Ball government.

Davis was re-elected in the 2019 provincial election defeating PC candidate Beth Crosbie in a re-match.

On September 6, 2019, he was appointed Minister of Tourism, Culture, Industry and Innovation following a cabinet shuffle.

On August 19, 2020, Davis was reappointed to cabinet in the Furey government. His former department of Minister of Tourism, Culture, Industry and Innovation was reconfigured as the Department of Tourism, Culture, Arts, and Recreation.

Davis was re-elected in the 2021 provincial election.

On April 8, 2021, he was appointed Minister of Environment and Climate Change.

On July 19, 2024, he was appointed as Minister of Justice and Public Safety and Minister Responsible for the Access to Information and Protection of Privacy Office.

On May 9, 2025, he was appointed Minister of Education and Early Childhood Development.

On August 15, 2025, Davis was appointed Minister of Families and Affordability in addition to his current portfolio in Education.

Davis was re-elected in the 2025 Newfoundland and Labrador general election.

== Electoral record ==
2025 Newfoundland and Labrador general election: Virginia Waters-Pleasantville
Party	Candidate	Votes	%	±%
Liberal	Bernard Davis	3,366	61.97	+2.36
New Democratic	Raj Sharan	1,080	19.88	+0.45
Progressive Conservative	G. Patrick Condon	986	18.15	-2.81
Total valid votes		5,432		
Total rejected ballots				
Turnout				
Eligible voters				
Liberal hold		Swing		+0.96

2021 Newfoundland and Labrador general election: Virginia Waters-Pleasantville
Party	Candidate	Votes	%	±%
Liberal	Bernard Davis	3,481	59.61	+15.36
Progressive Conservative	Vic Lawlor	1,224	20.96	-14.57
New Democratic	Jenn Deon	1,135	19.43	-0.79
Total valid votes		5,840	98.88	
Total rejected ballots		66	1.12	
Turnout		5,906	56.83	
Eligible voters		10,393		
Liberal hold		Swing		+14.96
Source(s) "Officially Nominated Candidates General Election 2021" (PDF). Elections Newfoundland and Labrador. "NL Election 2021 (Unofficial Results)".

2019 Newfoundland and Labrador general election
Party	Candidate	Votes	%	±%
Liberal	Bernard Davis	2,761	44.25	-0.79
Progressive Conservative	Beth Crosbie	2,217	35.53	+3.00
New Democratic	Jenn Deon	1,262	20.22	-2.21
Total valid votes		6,240	99.46	
Total rejected ballots		34	0.54	+0.22
Turnout		6,274	63.64	+6.79
Electors on the lists		9,858	–	
Liberal hold		Swing		-1.89
Source: Elections Newfoundland & Labrador

2015 Newfoundland and Labrador general election
Party	Candidate	Votes	%
Liberal	Bernard Davis	2,528	45.04
Progressive Conservative	Beth Crosbie	1,826	32.53
New Democratic	Bob Buckingham	1,259	22.43
Total valid votes		5,613	99.68
Total rejected ballots		18	0.32
Turnout		5,631	56.86
Eligible voters		9,904	
Source: Elections Newfoundland and Labrador

=== City Council ===
Candidate	Vote	%
2013 municipal elections
Ward 4
Bernard Davis	4,178	59.26
Lou Puddister	2,195	31.13
Tracy Holmes	677	9.60

Candidate	Vote	%
2009 municipal elections
At large (4 to be elected)
Sheilagh O'Leary	24,056	19.82
Sandy Hickman (X)	17,562	14.47
Tom Hann (X)	17,079	14.07
Gerry Colbert (X)	16,183	13.34
Bernard Davis	15,078	12.43
Simon Lono	14,705	12.12
Tom Badcock	8,650	7.13
Barry Buckle	4,352	3.59
Stephen Nolan	3,684	3.04

2008 by-election
Ward 4
Candidate	Vote	%
Debbie Hanlon	3,479	47.37%
Bernard Davis	2,861	38.96%
Sam Kelly	1,004	13.67%

Newfoundland and Labrador provincial government of Dwight Ball
Cabinet post (1)
Predecessor	Office	Successor
Al Hawkins	Minister of Advanced Education, Skills and Labour; November 8, 2018– September 6, 2019	Christopher Mitchelmore
