= John Hogan (Newfoundland and Labrador politician) =

Canadian politician

The Honourable John Hogan ECNL KC MHA
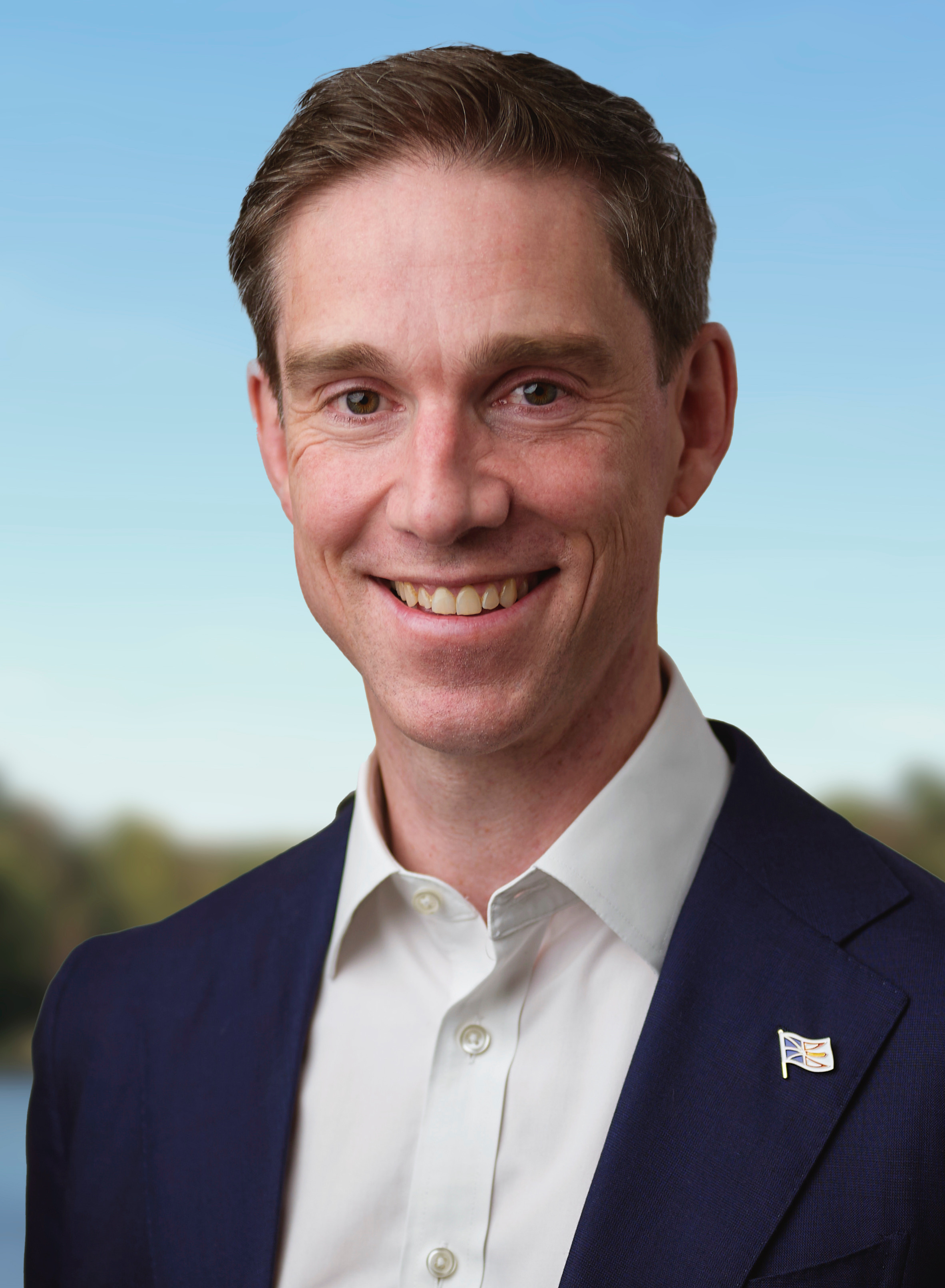
- Hogan in 2025

Leader of the Opposition in Newfoundland and Labrador
- Incumbent
- Assumed office October 29, 2025
- Preceded by: Tony Wakeham

15th Premier of Newfoundland and Labrador
- In office May 9, 2025 – October 29, 2025
- Monarch: Charles III
- Lieutenant Governor: Joan Marie Aylward
- Deputy: Siobhán Coady
- Preceded by: Andrew Furey
- Succeeded by: Tony Wakeham

Leader of the Liberal Party of Newfoundland and Labrador
- Incumbent
- Assumed office May 3, 2025
- Preceded by: Andrew Furey
Ministerial positions
Minister of Health and Community Services
In office 19 July 2024 – 3 March 2025
Premier	Andrew Furey
Preceded by	Tom Osborne
Succeeded by	John Haggie
Attorney General of Newfoundland and Labrador, And Government House Leader
In office 8 April 2021 – 3 March 2025
Premier	Andrew Furey
Preceded by	Andrew Parsons
Succeeded by	Andrew Parsons
Minister of Justice and Public Safety
In office 8 April 2021 – 19 July 2024
Premier	Andrew Furey
Preceded by	Steve Crocker
Succeeded by	Bernard Davis

Member of the Newfoundland and Labrador House of Assembly for Windsor Lake
- Incumbent
- Assumed office 27 March 2021
- Preceded by: Ches Crosbie

Personal details
- Born: March 7, 1978 (age 48) St. John’s, Newfoundland, Canada
- Party: Liberal
- Spouse: Gillian Hogan
- Children: 2
- Occupation: Lawyer

John Joseph Hogan (born March 7, 1978) is a Canadian politician who served as the 15th premier of Newfoundland and Labrador from May to October 2025. Hogan was elected to the Newfoundland and Labrador House of Assembly in the 2021 provincial election as the Liberal member for the electoral district of Windsor Lake. He served as Attorney General, Minister of Justice and Public Safety and Minister of Health and Community Services in the ministry of Premier Andrew Furey from 2021 to 2025.

He was elected leader of the Liberal Party of Newfoundland and Labrador on May 3, 2025 and subsequently took over as Premier. In the general election in October 2025, the Liberals were defeated by the Progressive Conservatives in an upset, with polls showing the Liberals with a strong polling lead as well as polls showing Hogan's approval rating being over 50%.

== Background ==
Hogan is the son of Kevin Hogan, a psychiatrist, and Alice Collins, an educator. His paternal grandfather and namesake John Hogan was a member of the Newfoundland Ranger Force. Hogan is a graduate of Memorial University of Newfoundland (BSc, 2000) and Dalhousie University (LLB, 2003). He was called to the Ontario bar in 2004.

Hogan then returned to Newfoundland and Labrador where he was called to the provincial bar in 2005. In 2014, Hogan started his own law firm, WPH Law. He has previously served on two occasions as an elected member to the Memorial University Board of Regents. Hogan served as counsel for the provincial Consumer Advocate at the Commission of Inquiry Respecting the Muskrat Falls Project.

== Politics ==
Hogan was a manager for Andrew Furey's campaign for the leadership of the provincial Liberal Party. Furey then encouraged him to enter provincial politics. In the 2021 provincial election, Hogan successfully challenged incumbent MHA and provincial Progressive Conservative leader Ches Crosbie in the district of Windsor Lake.

On April 8, 2021, Hogan was appointed Minister of Justice and Public Safety and Attorney General. On July 5, 2024, Health Minister Tom Osborne resigned, and Hogan was appointed in his place on July 19, 2024. When Premier Furey announced his pending resignation in 2025, Hogan resigned his cabinet positions and subsequently entered the leadership race. Hogan was elected leader on May 3, 2025.

On May 9, 2025, Hogan was officially sworn in as Premier at the Government House. His cabinet was sworn in alongside him. He led the province's response to the 2025 Newfoundland and Labrador wildfires in July and August. He gathered nationwide attention, with a September 2025 poll showing him with a 51% approval rating, the fourth highest of all Premiers. On September 15, Hogan asked the Lieutenant Governor to dissolve the House of Assembly to call for an election.

Hogan lead his party into the 2025 Newfoundland and Labrador general election. He was re-elected in his own seat of Windsor Lake. The Liberals focused their campaign on the Churchill Falls memorandum of understanding. Despite starting the campaign with a lead in the polls, the Progressive Conservatives, led by Tony Wakeham, won a majority government. This marked the first time since 2011 that the Progressive Conservatives had won an election in Newfoundland and Labrador.

== Electoral record ==
2025 Newfoundland and Labrador general election: Windsor Lake
Party	Candidate	Votes	%	±%
Liberal	John Hogan	3,424	69.27	+18.69
Progressive Conservative	Deanne Stapleton	1,052	21.28	-19.25
New Democratic	Marcia Porter	467	9.45	+0.57
Total valid votes		4,943		
Total rejected ballots				
Turnout				
Eligible voters				
Liberal hold		Swing		+18.97

2021 Newfoundland and Labrador general election: Windsor Lake
Party	Candidate	Votes	%	±%
Liberal	John Hogan	2,688	50.58	+12.12
Progressive Conservative	Ches Crosbie	2,154	40.53	-8.18
New Democratic	Tomás Shea	472	8.88	-3.94
Total valid votes		5,314	99.27	
Total rejected ballots		39	0.73	
Turnout		5,353	56.68	
Eligible voters		9,444		
Liberal gain from Progressive Conservative		Swing		+10.15
Source(s) "Officially Nominated Candidates General Election 2021" (PDF). Elections Newfoundland and Labrador. "NL Election 2021 (Unofficial Results)".

2025 Liberal Party of Newfoundland and Labrador leadership election
Candidate	First ballot	
Name	Votes	Points
John Hogan	TBA TBA%	TBA 77.48%
John Abbott	TBA TBA%	TBA 22.52%
Total	9,895	40,000
