= Christopher Mitchelmore =

Canadian politician (born 1985)

The Honourable Christopher Mitchelmore ECNL
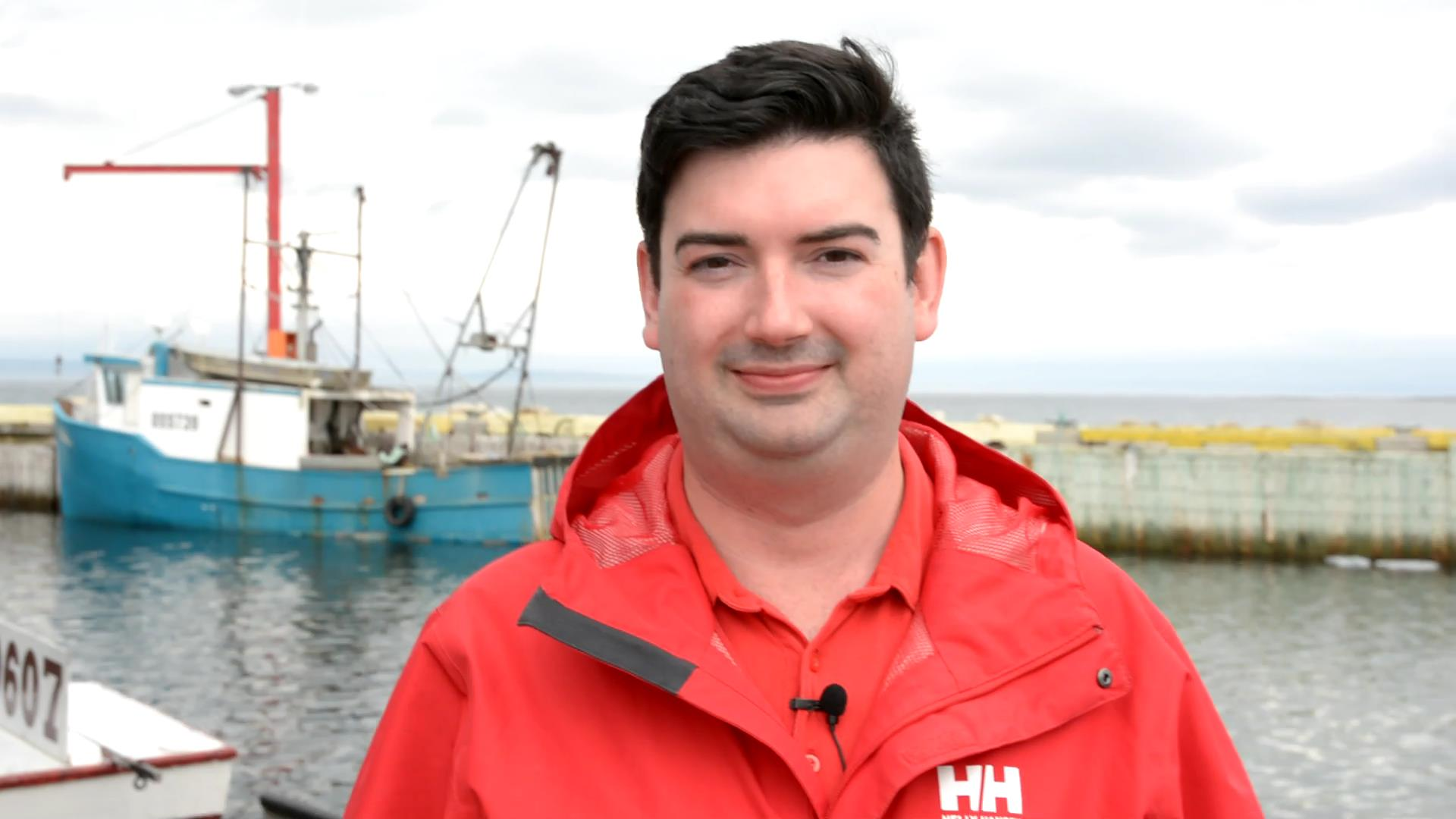

Minister of Advanced Education, Skills and Labour
- In office September 6, 2019 – August 19, 2020
- Preceded by: Bernard Davis
- Succeeded by: position abolished

Minister of Business, Tourism, Culture, Rural Development, Industry, innovation, Minister Responsible for Francophone Affairs, Minister Responsible for the Forestry and Agrifoods Agency, And Minister Responsible for the Research and Development Corporation
- In office December 14, 2015 – September 6, 2019
- Preceded by: Darin King
- Succeeded by: Bernard Davis

Member of the Newfoundland and Labrador House of Assembly for St. Barbe – L'Anse aux Meadows
- In office November 30, 2015 – January 15, 2021
- Preceded by: district established
- Succeeded by: Krista Howell

Member of the Newfoundland and Labrador House of Assembly for The Straits – White Bay North
- In office October 27, 2011 – November 30, 2015
- Preceded by: Marshall Dean
- Succeeded by: district abolished

Personal details
- Born: October 23, 1985 (age 40) St. Anthony, Newfoundland and Labrador
- Party: New Democrat (2011-2013); Independent (2013-2014); Liberal (2014-present)
- Occupation: Small Business Development Officer

Christopher Mitchelmore (born October 23, 1985) is a Canadian politician, who represented St. Barbe-L'Anse aux Meadows in the Newfoundland and Labrador House of Assembly from the 2011 provincial election until the 2021 provincial election.

== Background ==
Mitchelmore is a native of Green Island Cove, a tiny fishing village on the Great Northern Peninsula. At 16 years of age he founded "Flower's Island Museum". He added a Newfoundland-themed miniature golf course, gift shop and summer festival. The business operated until 2005, when Mitchelmore focused on completing his post-secondary education.

After graduating from Canon Richards High School, Flower's Cove in 2003, Mitchelmore went on to complete a Bachelor of Commerce Honours (Co-op) from Memorial University of Newfoundland. His university experience enabled him to work for the Department of Innovation, Trade & Rural Development, Newfoundland & Labrador Board of Commissioners of Public Utilities (PUB) and London Offshore Consultants (LOC) Group. He studied, both in the UK and at the University of Economics, Prague, Czech Republic. In 2008, he received the James Barnes Award for Academic Excellence.

Mitchelmore was employed with the Association of Professional Engineers, Geologists, Geophysicists of Alberta (APEGGA) and Community Business Development Corporation (CBDC) Nortip as a Youth Ventures Coordinator and most recently as a Client Services Officer, a role focused on creating and maintaining employment through business services, financing, skill enhancements, technical assistance, counselling and community economic development.

He has been engaged at the local, regional, provincial and national level, serving as the vice-President of the Straits-St. Barbe Chronic Care Corporation; Junior Achievement, Regional Chair; Director and Member of the Canadian Community Economic Development Network; co-Chair of Emerging Leaders; and Director with Nordic Economic Development Corporation.

== Politics ==
Mitchelmore was elected to the Newfoundland and Labrador House of Assembly in the 2011 provincial election for the district of The Straits – White Bay North representing the New Democratic Party (NDP).

On October 29, 2013 Mitchelmore left the NDP caucus after himself and all other NDP caucus members signed a letter calling on Lorraine Michael to hold a leadership election and Michael only agreed to a leadership review. On January 27, 2014 Mitchelmore resigned his NDP membership and sat as an Independent MHA with no formal connections to any political party.

On February 4, 2014, Mitchelmore and St. John's North MHA Dale Kirby joined the Liberal Party of NL.

Mitchelmore served as a member on the Public Accounts Committee until February 2014.

On May 9, 2014, Jerome Ward, a long-time Liberal and Special Assistant to Humber-St. Barbe-Baie Verte Liberal MP Gerry Byrne, announced that he would be seeking the nomination for The Straits-White Bay North. Mitchelmore won the nomination with 73 percent of the popular vote taking 1,127 votes and Ward receiving 423.

Mitchelmore was re-elected in the 2015 provincial election in the redistributed district of St. Barbe-L'Anse aux Meadows as a Liberal candidate and was subsequently appointed to cabinet. He served as Minister of Tourism, Culture, Industry and Innovation from 2015 to 2019.

Mitchelmore was re-elected in the 2019 provincial election defeating PC candidate and Roddickton-Bide Arm mayor Sheila Fitzgerald. On September 6, 2019, he was appointed Minister of Advanced Education, Skills and Labour following a cabinet shuffle. On December 5, 2019 the House of Assembly voted to reprimand Mitchelmore for his hiring of Carla Foote, daughter of Judy Foote, at The Rooms despite her lack of qualifications and her political connections to the Liberals. The House of Assembly ordered that Mitchelmore apologize to the Board of Directors of The Rooms, to the House of Assembly, and also be suspended two-week without pay.

On August 19, 2020, Mitchelmore announced that he is not seeking re-election; concurrently, he was dropped from cabinet.

Mitchelmore was succeeded as MHA by Liberal candidate Krista Howell on March 25, 2021.

== Electoral history ==
2019 Newfoundland and Labrador general election
Party	Candidate	Votes	%	±%
Liberal	Christopher Mitchelmore	3,474	60.80	
Progressive Conservative	Sheila Fitzgerald	2036	36.20	
Unaffiliated	Ford Mitchelmore	170	3.00	

2015 Newfoundland and Labrador general election
Party	Candidate	Votes	%	±%
Liberal	Christopher Mitchelmore	4,359	89.32	+53.1
NDP	Genevieve Brouillette	117	2.40	-25.5
Progressive Conservative	Ford Mitchelmore	404	8.28	-27.56

2011 Newfoundland and Labrador general election
Party	Candidate	Votes	%	±%
NDP	Christopher Mitchelmore	1,537	36.74	+28.81
Liberal	Marshall Dean	1,327	31.71	-15.87
Progressive Conservative	Selma Pike	1,320	31.55	-12.92
