= Steve Crocker (politician) =

Canadian politician

The Honourable Steve Crocker ECNL
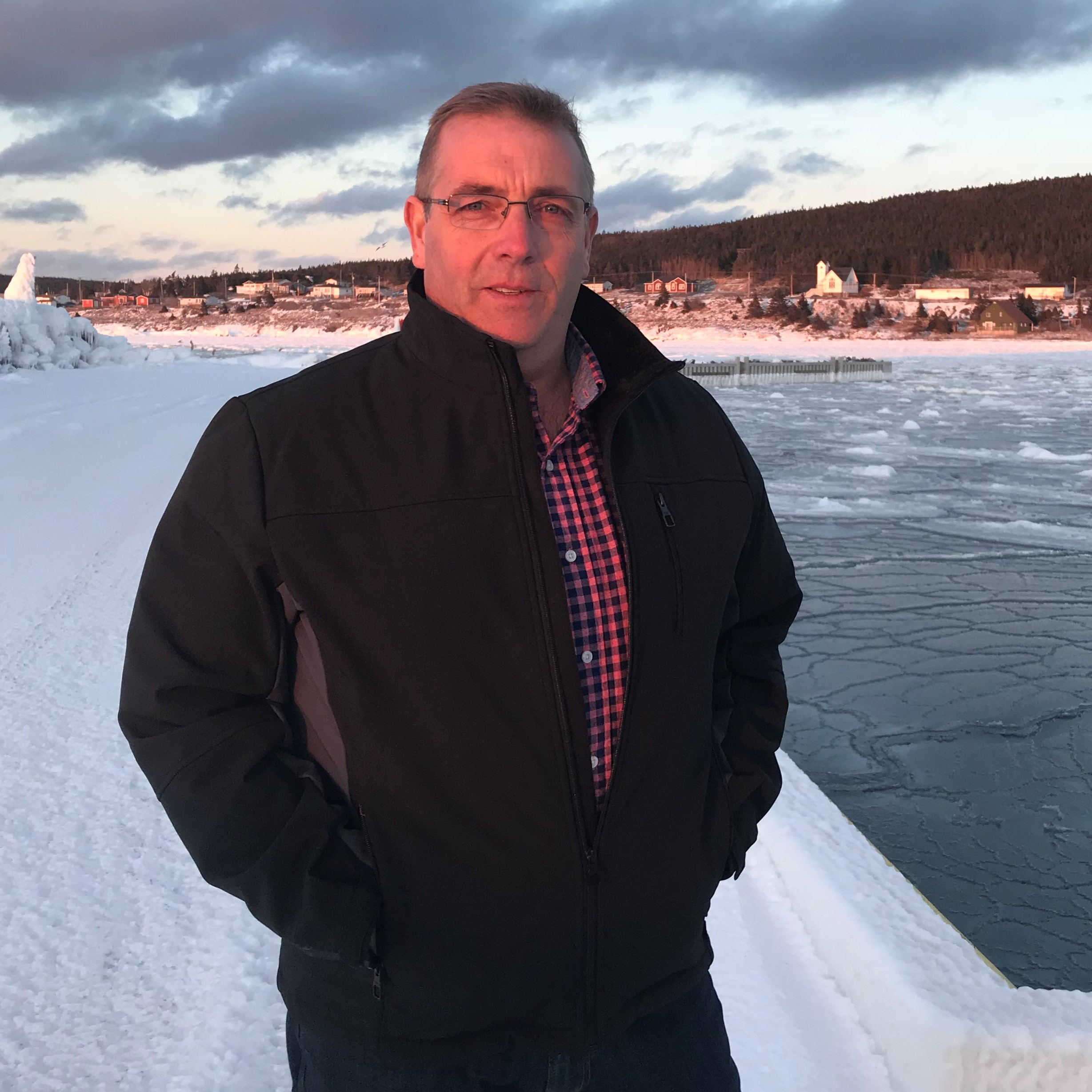

Minister of Industry, Energy and Technology, Minister Responsible for Trade Opportunities
- In office May 3, 2025 – October 29, 2025
- Premier: Andrew Furey; John Hogan
- Preceded by: Andrew Parsons
- Succeeded by: Lloyd Parrott

Minister of Fisheries and Aquaculture, Minister of Land Resources
- In office December 14, 2015 – July 31, 2017
- Preceded by: Vaughn Granter
- Succeeded by: Gerry Byrne

Minister of Tourism, Culture, Arts and Recreation and Government House Leader
- In office April 8, 2021 – May 9, 2025
- Premier: Andrew Furey; John Hogan
- Preceded by: Christopher Mitchelmore
- Succeeded by: Fred Hutton

Member of the Newfoundland and Labrador House of Assembly for Carbonear-Trinity-Bay de Verde Trinity-Bay de Verde (2014-2015)
- In office December 11, 2014 – October 14, 2025
- Preceded by: Charlene Johnson
- Succeeded by: Riley Balsom

Minister of Justice and Public Safety, And President of the Treasury Board
- In office August 19, 2020 – April 8, 2021
- Preceded by: Andrew Parsons
- Succeeded by: John Hogan

Personal details
- Party: Liberal Party
- Occupation: Businessman

Steve Crocker is a Canadian politician. He was elected to represent the district of Carbonear-Trinity-Bay de Verde in the Newfoundland and Labrador House of Assembly in a 2014 by-election, and re-elected in 2015. He is a member of the Liberal Party.

Crocker served as Minister of Fisheries, and subsequently as Minister of Transportation and Works in the Ball government.

Crocker was re-elected in the 2019 provincial election. On August 19, 2020, Crocker was appointed Minister of Justice and Public Safety, President of Treasury Board, and Government House Leader in the Furey government.

Crocker was re-elected in the 2021 provincial election. He was appointed Minister of Tourism, Culture, Arts and Recreation and Government House Leader.

Before being elected, Crocker served as an executive assistant to Newfoundland and Labrador Liberal leader Dwight Ball.

On May 3, 2025, Crocker was appointed interim Minister of the Department of Industry, Energy and Technology.

On July 14, 2025, Crocker announced he will not seek reelection.

== Election results ==
2021 Newfoundland and Labrador general election: Carbonear-Trinity-Bay de Verde
| Party | Candidate | Votes | % | ±% |
|---|---|---|---|---|
| Liberal | Steve Crocker | 3,892 | 67.53 | +7.25 |
| Progressive Conservative | Frank Butt | 1,596 | 27.69 | -6.32 |
| New Democratic | Matt Smith | 261 | 4.53 | -0.43 |
| Independent | Edward Thomas Cole | 14 | 0.24 | -0.50 |
| Total valid votes | | 5,763 | 99.41 | |
| Total rejected ballots | | 34 | 0.59 | |
| Turnout | | 5,797 | 51.55 | |
| Eligible voters | | 11,246 | | |
| Liberal hold | | Swing | | +6.79 |
Source(s) "Officially Nominated Candidates General Election 2021" (PDF). Elections Newfoundland and Labrador. "NL Election 2021 (Unofficial Results)".

2019 Newfoundland and Labrador general election
| Party | Candidate | Votes | % | ±% |
|---|---|---|---|---|
| Liberal | Steve Crocker | 4,292 | 60.3 | |
| Progressive Conservative | Jason Oliver | 2,422 | 34.0 | |
| New Democratic | Kathleen Burt | 353 | 5.0 | |
| Independent | Edward Thomas Cole | 53 | 0.7 | |
| Total valid votes | | | | |
| Total rejected ballots | | | | |
| Turnout | | | | |
| Eligible voters | | | | |

2015 Newfoundland and Labrador general election
| Party | Candidate | Votes | % | ±% |
|---|---|---|---|---|
| Liberal | Steve Crocker | 4952 | | |
| Progressive Conservative | Tomás Shea | 529 | | |
| New Democratic | David Coish | 304 | | |
| Independent | Ed Cole | 38 | | |

Newfoundland and Labrador provincial by-election, 25 November 2014
| Party | Candidate | Votes | % | ±% |
|---|---|---|---|---|
| Liberal | Steve Crocker | 3,074 | 65.53 | +41.60 |
| Progressive Conservative | Ronald Johnson | 1,363 | 29.06 | -32.86 |
| New Democratic | Tolson Rendell | 254 | 5.41 | -8.74 |
| Total valid votes | | 4,691 | | |
| Liberal gain from Progressive Conservative | | Swing | | +37.23 |
