= St. Barbe-L'Anse aux Meadows =

Provincial electoral district in Newfoundland and Labrador, Canada

Newfoundland and Labrador electoral district

Provincial electoral district
- Legislature: Newfoundland and Labrador House of Assembly
MHA
Andrea Barbour
Progressive Conservative
- District created: 2015
- First contested: 2015
- Last contested: 2025

Demographics
- Population (2011): 12,241
- Electors (2015): 9,281
- Area (km²): 8,600
- Census division: Division No. 9
- Census subdivision(s): Anchor Point, Bird Cove, Conche, Cook's Harbour, Division No. 9, Subd. C, Division No. 9, Subd. D, Division No. 9, Subd. F, Division No. 9, Subd. G, Englee, Flower's Cove, Goose Cove East, Hawke's Bay, Main Brook, Port au Choix, Port Saunders, Raleigh, River of Ponds, Roddickton-Bide Arm, St. Anthony, St. Lunaire-Griquet

St. Barbe-L'Anse aux Meadows is a provincial electoral district in Newfoundland and Labrador, Canada, which is represented by one member in the Newfoundland and Labrador House of Assembly. It was contested for the first time in the 2015 provincial election. It was created out of all of The Straits-White Bay North and part of St. Barbe. St. Anthony is the largest population centre in the district.

Nearby districts include Cartwright-L'Anse au Clair and Humber-Gros Morne.

== Members of the House of Assembly ==
The district has elected the following members of the House of Assembly:

Assembly	Years	Member	Party
48th	2015–2019	Chris Mitchelmore	Liberal
49th	2019–2021	Chris Mitchelmore	Liberal
50th	2021–2025	Krista Lynn Howell	Liberal
51st	2025–present	Andrea Barbour	Progressive Conservative

== Election results ==
Graph of election results (minor parties that never got 2% of the vote or did not run consistently are omitted) View source data.

2025 Newfoundland and Labrador general election
Party	Candidate	Votes	%	±%
Progressive Conservative	Andrea Barbour	2,596	55.20	+8.69
Liberal	Krista Howell	2,001	42.55	-8.62
New Democratic	Beth Ryan	106	2.25	+1.44
Total valid votes		4,703		
Total rejected ballots				
Turnout				
Eligible voters				
Progressive Conservative gain from Liberal		Swing		+8.65

2021 Newfoundland and Labrador general election
Party	Candidate	Votes	%	±%
Liberal	Krista Lynn Howell	2,375	51.16	-10.00
Progressive Conservative	Sheila Fitzgerald	2,159	46.51	+10.66
Independent	Ford Mitchelmore	70	1.51	-1.48
New Democratic	John McClusky	38	0.82	
Total valid votes		4,642	99.68	
Total rejected ballots		15	0.32	
Turnout		4,657	51.30	
Eligible voters		9,078		
Liberal hold		Swing		-10.33
Source(s) "Officially Nominated Candidates General Election 2021" (PDF). Elections Newfoundland and Labrador. "NL Election 2021 (Unofficial Results)".

2019 Newfoundland and Labrador general election
Party	Candidate	Votes	%	±%
Liberal	Chris Mitchelmore	3,474	61.16	-28.16
Progressive Conservative	Sheila Fitzgerald	2,036	35.85	+27.57
Independent	Ford Mitchelmore	170	2.99	
Total valid votes		5,680	99.49	
Total rejected ballots		29	0.51	+0.12
Turnout		5,709	64.85	+12.07
Eligible voters		8,803		
Liberal hold		Swing		-27.86

2015 Newfoundland and Labrador general election
Party	Candidate	Votes	%
Liberal	Chris Mitchelmore	4,359	89.32
Progressive Conservative	Ford Mitchelmore	404	8.28
New Democratic	Genevieve Brouillette	117	2.40
Total valid votes		4,880	99.61
Total rejected ballots		19	0.39
Turnout		4,899	52.79
Eligible voters		9,281	
Source: Elections Newfoundland and Labrador

== See also ==
- List of Newfoundland and Labrador provincial electoral districts
- Canadian provincial electoral districts
