= Virginia Waters-Pleasantville =

Provincial electoral district in Newfoundland and Labrador, Canada

Newfoundland and Labrador electoral district
- Location in the St. John's area

Provincial electoral district
- Legislature: Newfoundland and Labrador House of Assembly
MHA
Bernard Davis
Liberal
- District created: 2015
- First contested: 2015
- Last contested: 2025

Demographics
- Population (2011): 14,152
- Electors (2015): 9,904
- Area (km²): 15
- Census division: Division No. 1
- Census subdivision: St. John's

Virginia Waters-Pleasantville is a provincial electoral district in Newfoundland and Labrador, Canada. In 2011 there were 14,152 people living in the district.

Virginia Waters-Pleasantville includes part of the city of St. John's. The district was created following the 2015 electoral districts boundaries review. The district includes parts of the former districts of St. John's East, Signal Hill-Quidi Vidi, and Virginia Waters.

== Members of the House of Assembly ==
The district has elected the following members of the House of Assembly:

Assembly	Years	Member	Party
Riding created from St. John's East, Signal Hill-Quidi Vidi, and Virginia Waters.
48th	2015–2019	Bernard Davis	Liberal
49th	2019–2021	Bernard Davis	Liberal
50th	2021–2025	Bernard Davis	Liberal
51st	2025–present	Bernard Davis	Liberal

== Election results ==
Graph of election results (minor parties that never got 2% of the vote or did not run consistently are omitted) View source data.

2025 Newfoundland and Labrador general election
Party	Candidate	Votes	%	±%
Liberal	Bernard Davis	3,366	61.97	+2.36
New Democratic	Raj Sharan	1,080	19.88	+0.45
Progressive Conservative	G. Patrick Condon	986	18.15	-2.81
Total valid votes		5,432		
Total rejected ballots				
Turnout				
Eligible voters				
Liberal hold		Swing		+0.96

2021 Newfoundland and Labrador general election
Party	Candidate	Votes	%	±%
Liberal	Bernard Davis	3,481	59.61	+15.36
Progressive Conservative	Vic Lawlor	1,224	20.96	-14.57
New Democratic	Jenn Deon	1,135	19.43	-0.79
Total valid votes		5,840	98.88	
Total rejected ballots		66	1.12	
Turnout		5,906	56.83	
Eligible voters		10,393		
Liberal hold		Swing		+14.96
Source(s) "Officially Nominated Candidates General Election 2021" (PDF). Elections Newfoundland and Labrador. "NL Election 2021 (Unofficial Results)".

2019 Newfoundland and Labrador general election
Party	Candidate	Votes	%	±%
Liberal	Bernard Davis	2,761	44.25	-0.79
Progressive Conservative	Beth Crosbie	2,217	35.53	+3.00
New Democratic	Jenn Deon	1,262	20.22	-2.21
Total valid votes		6,240	99.46	
Total rejected ballots		34	0.54	+0.22
Turnout		6,274	63.64	+6.79
Electors on the lists		9,858	–	
Liberal hold		Swing		-1.89
Source: Elections Newfoundland & Labrador

2015 Newfoundland and Labrador general election
Party	Candidate	Votes	%
Liberal	Bernard Davis	2,528	45.04
Progressive Conservative	Beth Crosbie	1,826	32.53
New Democratic	Bob Buckingham	1,259	22.43
Total valid votes		5,613	99.68
Total rejected ballots		18	0.32
Turnout		5,631	56.86
Eligible voters		9,904	
Source: Elections Newfoundland and Labrador

== See also ==
- List of Newfoundland and Labrador provincial electoral districts
- Canadian provincial electoral districts
