= Andrea Barbour =

Canadian politician

The Honourable Andrea Barbour ECNL MHA
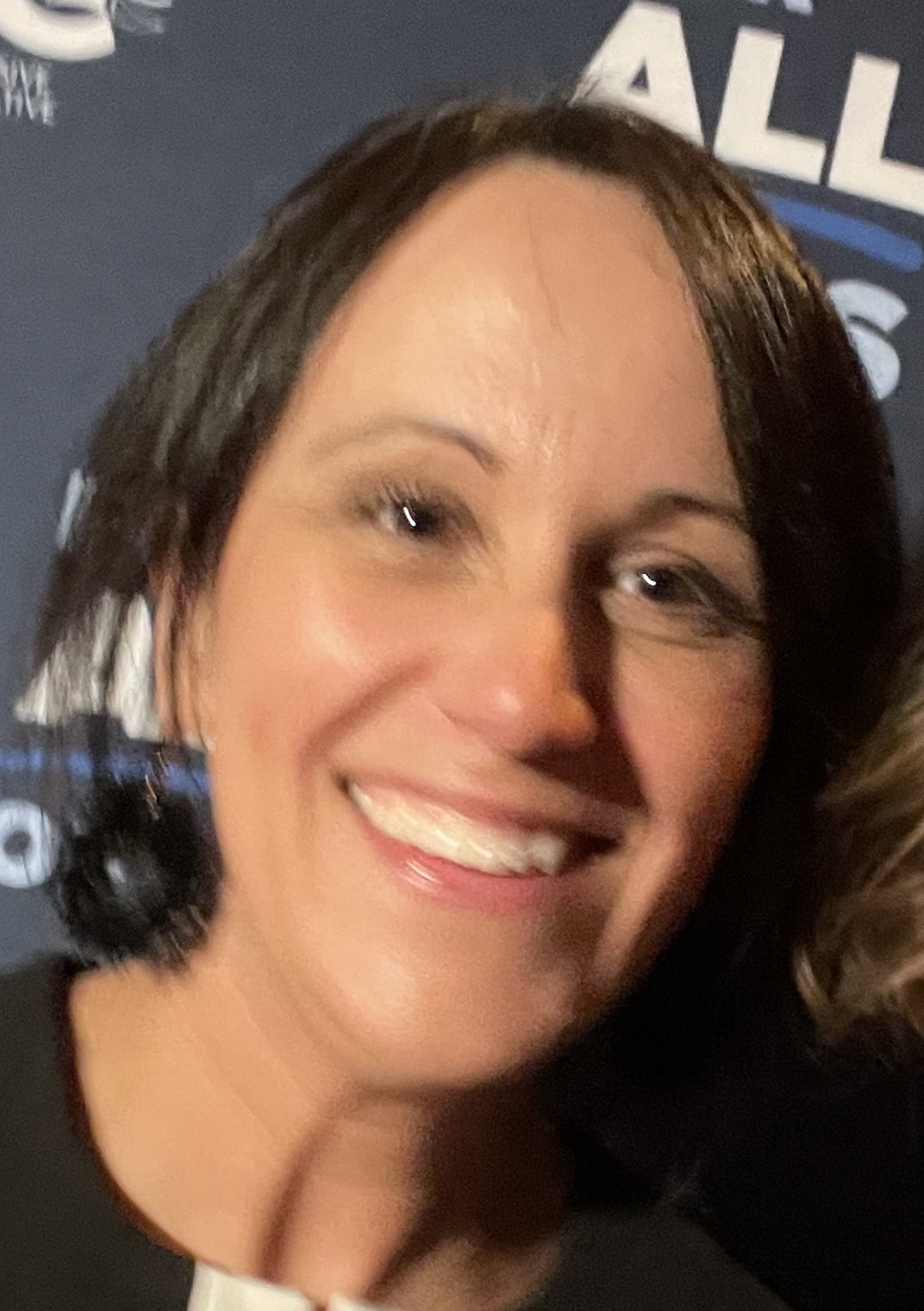
- Barbour in 2026

Member of the Newfoundland and Labrador House of Assembly for St. Barbe-L'Anse aux Meadows
- Incumbent
- Assumed office November 3, 2025
- Preceded by: Krista Howell

Minister of Tourism, Culture, Arts, and Minister of Sports, and Recreation and Parks
- In office October 29, 2025 – August 20, 2026
- Preceded by: Fred Hutton
- Succeeded by: Mike Goosney

Minister of Environment, Conservation and Climate Change
- Incumbent
- Assumed office August 20, 2026
- Preceded by: Chris Tibbs

Personal details
- Born: Andrea Cull St. Anthony, Newfoundland, Canada
- Party: Progressive Conservative
- Spouse: Matthew Barbour
- Children: 1
- Education: Memorial University of Newfoundland (B.Sc.)
- Occupation: Real estate agent public servant artist

Andrea Barbour (née Cull) is a Canadian politician from Newfoundland and Labrador. She was elected to the House of Assembly in the 2025 general election for the electoral district of St. Barbe-L'Anse aux Meadows.

== Background ==
Barbour graduated from Memorial University of Newfoundland with a Bachelor of Science degree in physical geography. She was a stay-at-home mother and former federal government employee. She became viral on TikTok where she posted traditional home-cooked recipes. She is also the owner of the Rise Above Boutique NL. She told a local newspaper that a near-death experience in 2020 left her "without a doubt that heaven, angels, and God are real."

== Political career ==
Barbour was elected to the Newfoundland and Labrador House of Assembly in St. Barbe-L'Anse aux Meadows in the 2025 general election.

On October 29, 2025 Barbour was appointed to the Executive Council as Minister of Tourism, Culture, and Arts, Minister of Sports, Recreation, and Parks, Minister Responsible of PictureNL, Minister Responsible for Newfoundland and Labrador Arts Council, and Minister Responsible for the Pippy Park Commission.

After her appointment, Barbour wiped her social media feeds. Some of her earlier social media posts drew criticism, including comments made that Newfoundland and Labrador culture was being “washed out” that when she grew up, "it was only Newfoundlanders and Labradorians here."

Barbour told media it was a personal decision to remove some of her platforms. Despite criticisms, Barbour was positive in February 2026 about her position, stating to media "it is a perfect fit for who I am."

In April 2026, during her stent as Minister of Tourism, Barbour came under fire for leveraging ChatGPT to edit a photo of herself in front of St. John's cultural centre The Rooms alongside statistics related to the economic effect of tourism in the province. The alteration falsely adjusted proportions of the building, and the iconic caribou, representative of Royal Newfoundland Regiment's pivotal role in World War I, was missing; Barbour apologized for the incident. She later delivered to the House of Assembly "a tearful speech about bullying she says she’s faced since taking office."

On 1 July 2026, Barbour delivered a six-minute speech at the Beaumont-Hamel Newfoundland Memorial in northern France, where she stumbled over several words, failing to pronounce Beaumont-Hamel, shrapnel, and valour. Following the event, Barbour issued an apology in which she noted some people felt she did not meet standards of presentation.

On 20 August 2026, Newfoundland and Labrador Premier Tony Wakeham shuffled his cabinet. Barbour moved to a new role as Minister responsible for Environment, Conservation and Climate Change, as well as being the minister overseeing the Multi-Materials Stewardship Board. Regarding Barbour's new placement, the Premier was quoted as saying "I think we’ve got a great fit."

On September 17, 2026, Barbour voted to approve the Churchill Falls Definitive Cooperation and Implementation Agreement (DCIA) in the House of Assembly along with the PC caucus.

== Election Results ==
2025 Newfoundland and Labrador general election: St. Barbe-L'Anse aux Meadows
Party	Candidate	Votes	%	±%
Progressive Conservative	Andrea Barbour	2,596	55.20	+8.69
Liberal	Krista Howell	2,001	42.55	-8.62
New Democratic	Beth Ryan	106	2.25	+1.44
Total valid votes		4,703		
Total rejected ballots				
Turnout				
Eligible voters				
Progressive Conservative gain from Liberal		Swing		+8.65
