= John Haggie =

Canadian politician

The Honourable Doctor John Haggie ECNL

Minister of Justice and Public Safety and Attorney General
- In office May 9, 2025 – October 29, 2025
- Lieutenant Governor: Joan Marie Aylward
- Preceded by: Andrew Parsons
- Succeeded by: Helen Conway-Ottenheimer

Minister of Municipal and Provincial Affairs
- In office June 14, 2023 – May 9, 2025
- Preceded by: Krista Lynn Howell
- Succeeded by: Paul Pike

Minister of Education in Newfoundland and Labrador
- In office July 6, 2022 – June 14, 2023
- Preceded by: Tom Osborne
- Succeeded by: Krista Lynn Howell

Minister of Health and Community Services in Newfoundland and Labrador
- In office December 14, 2015 – July 6, 2022
- Premier: Dwight Ball; Andrew Furey
- Preceded by: Steve Kent
- Succeeded by: Tom Osborne
- In office March 3, 2025 – May 9, 2025
- Preceded by: John Hogan
- Succeeded by: Krista Lynn Howell

Member of the Newfoundland and Labrador House of Assembly for Gander
- In office November 30, 2015 – October 14, 2025
- Preceded by: Kevin O'Brien
- Succeeded by: Bettina Ford

Registrar General
- In office June 16, 2023 – May 9, 2025
- Preceded by: Krista Lynn Howell
- Succeeded by: Paul Pike

Personal details
- Born: February 1, 1954 (age 72) Manchester, England
- Party: Liberal
- Occupation: Retired general surgeon

John Alastair Haggie is a Canadian politician, who was elected to the Newfoundland and Labrador House of Assembly in the 2015 provincial election. He represented the electoral district of Gander as a member of the Liberal Party.

== Early life ==
Haggie was born to a mother whose maiden surname was Wilson in Manchester, England, in March 1954. His father died when he was young, and his mother's younger brother Glyn helped raise him. Haggie was educated at William Hulme's Grammar School, after which he completed his medical education at Victoria University of Manchester in 1977. He trained in general surgery in the North West Region, culminating in earning his Fellowship in 1981. Subsequently, after a two-year fellowship at the Christie Hospital and Paterson Institute for Cancer Research, he received a doctorate in cancer research in 1987.

== Move to Newfoundland and career ==
After working as a surgeon, tutor, and a lecturer at universities in Manchester and Liverpool, Haggie immigrated to Newfoundland and Labrador in 1993. He practiced as a general surgeon with the Grenfell Region Health Services in St. Anthony until 1997, when he relocated his practice to the James Paton Memorial Hospital in Gander. He served as president of the Newfoundland and Labrador Medical Association from 2001 to 2002. Haggie also served as president of the Canadian Medical Association from 2011 to 2012.

=== Politics ===
Haggie was appointed to cabinet in the Ball government as Minister of Health and Community Services on December 14, 2015. He was re-elected in the 2019 provincial election. On August 19, 2020, Haggie was reappointed Minister of Health and Community Services in the Furey government. At the time, he was the longest serving NL Minister of Health and Community Services in thirty six years.

Haggie was re-elected in the 2021 provincial election. Following the election, he was reappointed Minister of Health and Community Services. On July 6, 2022, Haggie was appointed Minister of Education. On June 14, 2023, he was appointed Minister of Municipal and Provincial Affairs. On March 3, 2025, Minister John Hogan resigned his cabinet position and Haggie was named interim Minister of Health and Community Services. On May 9, 2025, he was appointed Minister of Justice and Public Safety and Attorney General.

On July 14, 2025, Haggie announced that he would not seek reelection.

== Personal life ==
Haggie had three children with his first wife, Jane Elizabeth (nee Wilson) - Hollie, Jennifer, and Elizabeth. Jane died at age 52 on May 25, 2005 in Gander. He is currently married to Jeannette Augot, a registered nurse employed by the Central Health Regional Medical Authority.

His favorite book is Shōgun by James Clavell. He also holds an interest in competitive handgun shooting, having tried out to become a squad member of the Welsh national team prior to immigrating to Canada.

On January 1, 2022, Haggie announced on his Facebook page that he tested positive for COVID-19.

== Electoral record ==
2021 Newfoundland and Labrador general election: Gander
Party	Candidate	Votes	%	±%
Liberal	John Haggie	3,358	70.93	+12.36
Progressive Conservative	Jamie Harnum	1,228	25.94	-15.49
New Democratic	Dawn Lahey	148	3.13	
Total valid votes		4,734	99.58	
Total rejected ballots		20	0.42	
Turnout		4,754	47.85	
Eligible voters		9,935		
Liberal hold		Swing		+13.93
Source(s) "Officially Nominated Candidates General Election 2021" (PDF). Elections Newfoundland and Labrador. "NL Election 2021 (Unofficial Results)".

2019 Newfoundland and Labrador general election
Party	Candidate	Votes	%	±%
Liberal	John Haggie	3,311	58.6	-9.0
Progressive Conservative	Ryan Wagg	2,342	41.4	+34.4
Total valid votes		5,653	100	
Total rejected ballots		73		
Turnout		5,726	61.6	+14.1
Eligible voters		9,296		

2015 Newfoundland and Labrador general election
Party	Candidate	Votes	%	±%
Liberal	John Haggie	3,151	67.56	+36.65
New Democratic	Lukas Norman	1,184	25.39	+8.57
Progressive Conservative	Ryan Menchion	329	7.05	-45.22
Total valid votes		4,664	99.53	–
Total rejected ballots		22	0.47	–
Turnout		4,686	47.46	-5.61
Eligible voters		9,874		
Liberal gain from Progressive Conservative		Swing		+22.61
Source: Elections Newfoundland and Labrador
