= Fred Hutton =

Canadian politician

The Honourable Fred Hutton ECNL MHA

Minister of Tourism, Culture, Arts and Recreation
- In office May 9, 2025 – October 14, 2025
- Preceded by: Steve Crocker
- Succeeded by: Andrea Barbour

Minister of Transportation and Infrastructure
- In office July 19, 2024 – May 9, 2025
- Preceded by: John Abbott
- Succeeded by: Elvis Loveless

Minister of Housing
- In office February 29, 2024 – July 19, 2024
- Preceded by: Paul Pike (Note: As Minister Responsible for the Newfoundland and Labrador Housing Corporation)
- Succeeded by: John Abbott

Member of the Newfoundland and Labrador House of Assembly for Conception Bay East–Bell Island
- Incumbent
- Assumed office February 21, 2024
- Preceded by: David Brazil

Minister of Rural Economic Development
- In office July 19, 2024 – May 9, 2025
- Preceded by: Position established
- Succeeded by: Pam Parsons

Personal details
- Born: St. John’s, Newfoundland and Labrador, Canada
- Party: Liberal
- Spouse: Bonnie Hutton
- Children: 4
- Occupation: Journalist

Frederick Charles Hutton is a Canadian politician from Newfoundland and Labrador. Hutton was elected to the Newfoundland and Labrador House of Assembly for the Liberal Party in the 2024 Conception Bay East–Bell Island provincial by-election. The district had been held by Progressive Conservatives for the previous 20 years.

== Background ==
Hutton formerly worked as a journalist and advisor to Premier Andrew Furey. Hutton worked for CJON-TV co-anchoring the NTV Evening Newshour from 1990 to 2013. He worked as both a news director and a morning show co-host at VOCM. He also co-hosted The St. John's Morning Show on CBN from 2017 to 2019.

== Cabinet Minister ==
On February 29, 2024, Hutton was appointed Minister of Housing and Minister responsible for the Newfoundland and Labrador Housing Corporation. On July 19, 2024, he was appointed as Minister of Rural Economic Development and Minister of Transportation and Infrastructure. On May 9, 2025, he was appointed Minister of Tourism, Culture, Arts and Recreation.

Hutton was re-elected in the 2025 Newfoundland and Labrador general election.

== Electoral record ==
2025 Newfoundland and Labrador general election: Conception Bay East–Bell Island
Party	Candidate	Votes	%	±%
Liberal	Fred Hutton	3,730	57.23	+11.33
Progressive Conservative	Tina Neary	2,285	35.06	-2.89
New Democratic	Henry House	503	7.72	-7.20
Total valid votes		6,518		
Total rejected ballots				
Turnout				
Eligible voters				
Liberal hold		Swing		+7.11

Newfoundland and Labrador provincial by-election, January 30, 2024 Resignation of David Brazil
Party	Candidate	Votes	%	±%
Liberal	Fred Hutton	2,603	45.90	+12.82
Progressive Conservative	Tina Neary	2,152	37.95	–18.24
New Democratic	Kim Churchill	846	14.92	+4.19
Independent	Darryl Harding	70	1.23	New
Total valid votes		5,671		
Turnout			44.72	–5.40
Eligible voters		12,682		
Liberal gain from Progressive Conservative		Swing		+15.53

== See also ==
- 50th General Assembly of Newfoundland and Labrador
