= Andrew Furey =

Canadian politician (born 1975)

The Honourable Andrew Furey ECNL FRCSC
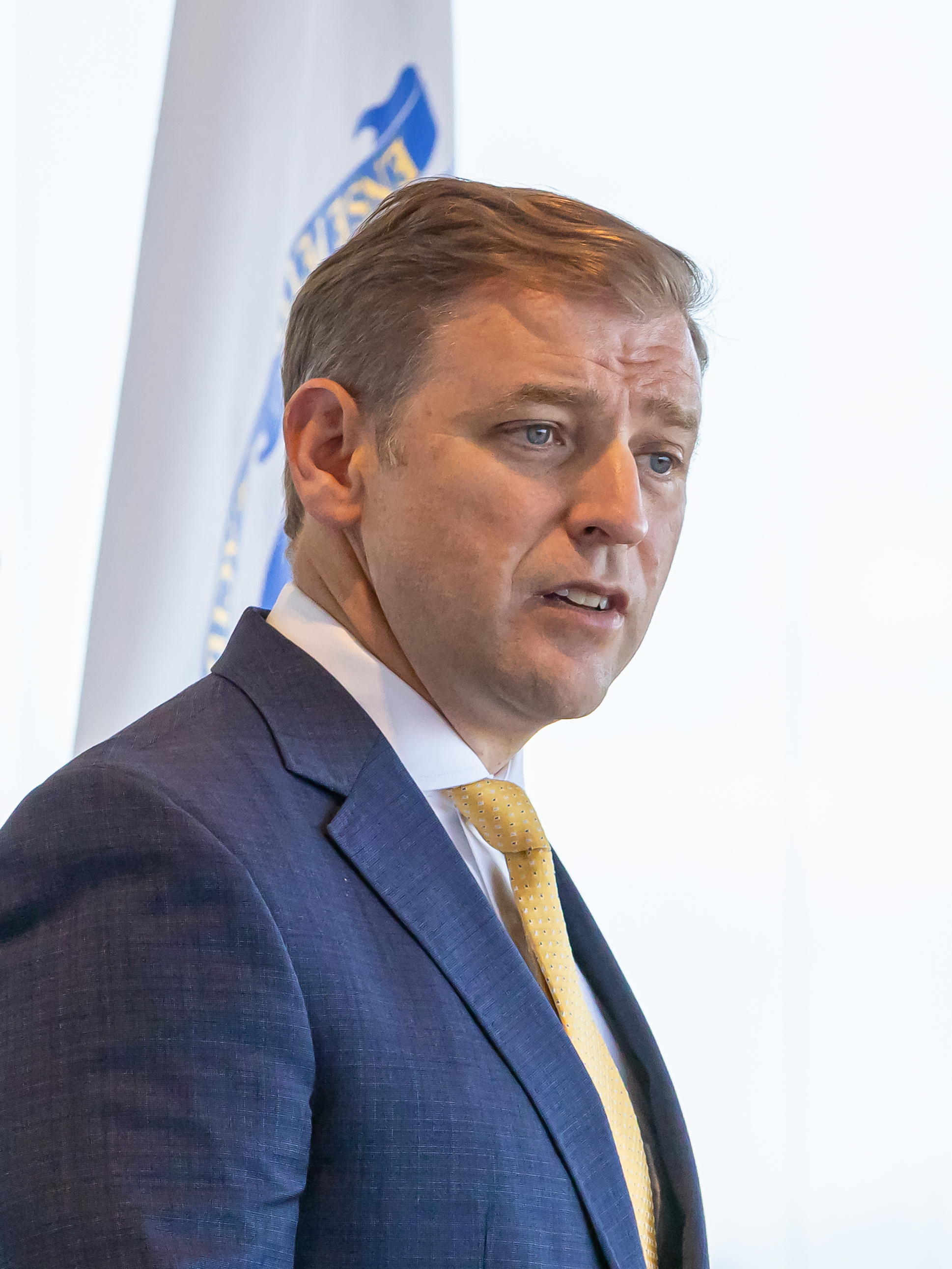
- Furey in 2024

14th Premier of Newfoundland and Labrador
- In office August 19, 2020 – May 9, 2025
- Monarchs: Elizabeth II; Charles III
- Lieutenant Governor: Judy Foote; Joan Marie Aylward
- Deputy: Siobhán Coady
- Preceded by: Dwight Ball
- Succeeded by: John Hogan

Leader of the Liberal Party of Newfoundland and Labrador
- In office August 3, 2020 – May 3, 2025
- Preceded by: Dwight Ball
- Succeeded by: John Hogan

Member of the Newfoundland and Labrador House of Assembly for Humber-Gros Morne
- In office October 22, 2020 – July 3, 2025
- Preceded by: Dwight Ball
- Succeeded by: Mike Goosney

Personal details
- Born: Andrew John Furey; July 2, 1975 (age 51) St. John's, Newfoundland and Labrador, Canada
- Party: Liberal
- Parents: George Furey (father); Karen Furey (mother)
- Relatives: Chuck Furey (uncle)
- Education: Memorial University of Newfoundland (BS, MD)
- Profession: Politician; Orthopaedic surgeon

Andrew John Furey ECNL FRCSC (born July 2, 1975) is a Canadian politician and surgeon who was the 14th premier of Newfoundland and Labrador, from 2020 to 2025. A member of the Newfoundland and Labrador Liberal Party, Furey represented Humber-Gros Morne in the Newfoundland and Labrador House of Assembly from 2020 to 2025.

On February 25, 2025, Furey announced his intention to resign as premier and leader of the Liberal Party as soon as a successor was chosen. His successor, John Hogan, was sworn in on May 9, 2025.

== Early life and career ==
Furey was born in St. John's on July 2, 1975. His father George Furey, a school principal and barrister, was appointed to the Senate of Canada in 1999 and served as the speaker of the Senate of Canada from 2015 until his retirement in 2023. His uncle Chuck Furey was MHA for St. Barbe and subsequently served as a cabinet minister in the provincial governments of Clyde Wells and Brian Tobin.

Raised in St. John's, Furey earned a Bachelor of Science degree from Memorial University of Newfoundland (MUN) and graduated from the MUN School of Medicine in 2001. He would later accept a Fellowship in orthopaedic trauma from R Adams Cowley Shock Trauma Center, University of Maryland in Baltimore, Maryland, from 2006 to 2007, before returning to Newfoundland to practise medicine at his own clinic. He was later named Memorial University of Newfoundland's Alumnus of the Year in 2012, and became a recipient of the Ignatian Spirit Award in 2015. He also completed a diploma in organizational leadership from the University of Oxford that same year. In 2017, Furey was named the Canadian Red Cross' humanitarian of the year for Newfoundland and Labrador.

== Philanthropic work ==
In 2011, Furey co-founded Team Broken Earth, a volunteer task force supporting the relief effort in Haiti following the 2010 earthquake. By 2013, the organization assisted hundreds of patients a week in Port-au-Prince, Haiti, with Furey often personally leading the missions there. The organization's efforts were temporarily halted in 2019 due to safety concerns amid rising violence in the country.

Furey also co-founded the "A Dollar a Day" foundation alongside singer-songwriter Alan Doyle and businessman Brendan Paddick, which aims to provide funding for mental health initiatives in Newfoundland and Labrador. In addition to this, Furey also serves as the co-chair for the Jack Hand Foundation.

In 2020, Furey released a book, Hope in the Balance: A Newfoundland Doctor Meets a World in Crisis, discussing his experiences in Haiti.

== Political career ==
The logo of the Liberal Party during Furey's premiership.

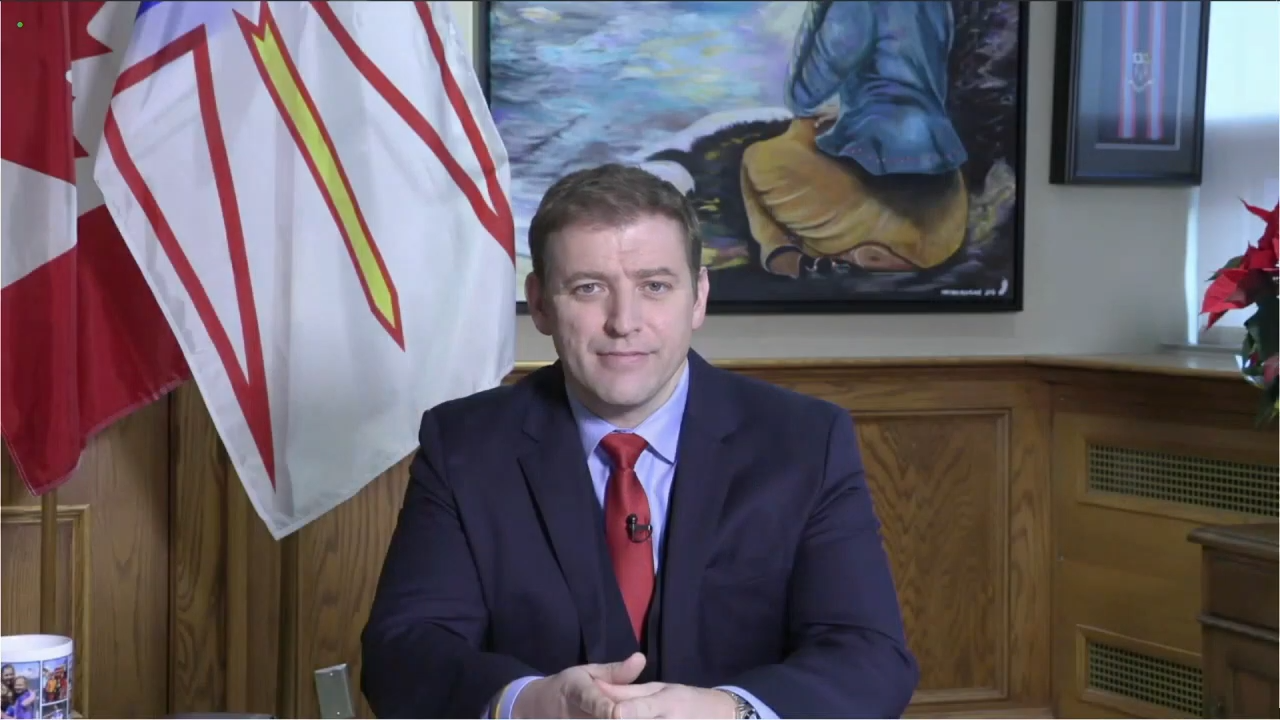
Furey in 2020

Furey first expressed interest in entering politics in 2015, saying that his work with Team Broken Earth "left me with a want and desire to do more". Speculation that Furey was being pitched to replace incumbent Premier Dwight Ball emerged as early as 2017.

When Ball announced his eventual resignation in February 2020, Furey quickly became a potential contender and was almost immediately regarded as the frontrunner to succeed him. Furey announced his intention to run for the leadership of the Newfoundland and Labrador Liberal Party on March 3, 2020, in St. John's, and he was swiftly endorsed by the majority of Ball's cabinet. On August 3, 2020, he was elected leader at the party's convention, receiving approximately two-thirds of votes cast. On August 19, 2020, Furey was formally sworn in as Premier, along with his provincial cabinet.

As Furey did not hold a seat in the legislature, he announced on September 7, 2020, that he would contest the by-election for Ball's former seat of Humber-Gros Morne. On October 6, 2020, Furey won the by-election in Humber-Gros Morne.

On January 15, 2021, Furey asked Lieutenant Governor Judy Foote to dissolve the House of Assembly to call for an election in order to obtain a stronger mandate in the form of a majority government. The election was originally scheduled for February 13, 2021, but a COVID-19 outbreak in St. John's forced Elections NL to switch to a mail-in election, cancelling in-person voting for all districts. The deadline was set on March 25, 2021, and the results were announced on March 27, 2021, with Furey's Liberals winning a majority government.

On June 23, 2021, Furey announced Nalcor Energy would be dismantled and folded into Newfoundland and Labrador Hydro.

On December 23, 2021, during the Omicron variant outbreak that put over 1,000 health-care workers in isolation, Furey helped administer vaccines to current and retired public service workers and their families at the Confederation Building. Furey then travelled to Labrador, particularly Happy Valley-Goose Bay, on January 3, 2022, to help a team of physicians administer vaccines. Furey then travelled to Bell Island to help administer vaccines on January 13, 2022.

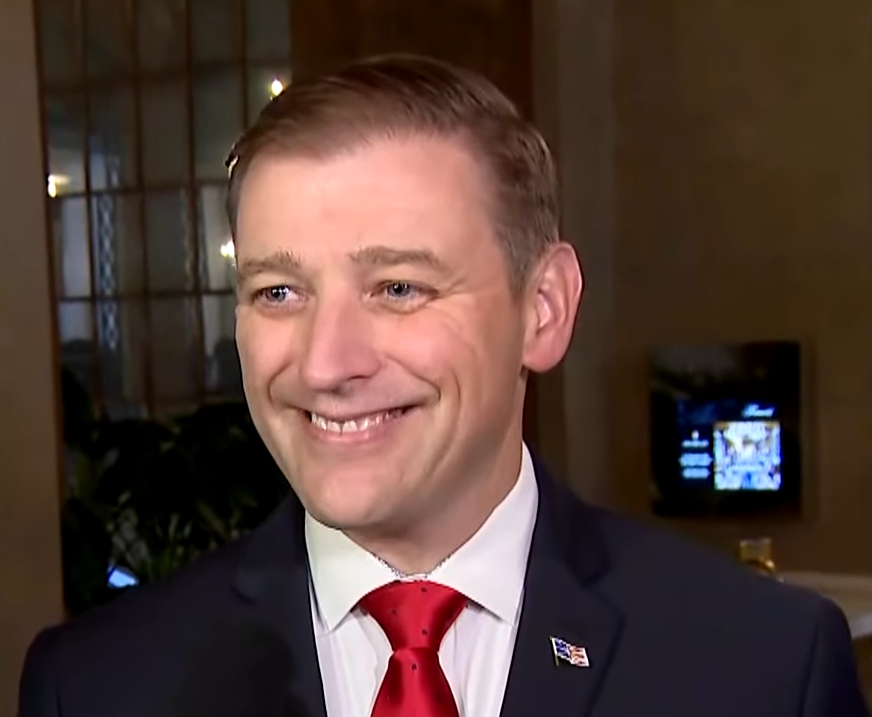
Furey in 2023

On January 30, 2024, Liberal candidate Fred Hutton was elected in the Conception Bay East - Bell Island by-election gaining the seat from the Progressive Conservatives.

In December 2024, Furey and Quebec premier François Legault signed a 50-year agreement renegotiating the 1969 Churchill Falls Generating Station agreement, which had become vastly more profitable for Hydro-Québec after energy prices significantly rose but the cost for Hydro-Québec to purchase energy was frozen by the contract until 2041. If ratified by both provinces, the rates for Churchill Falls would go up and Quebec would pay Newfoundland and Labrador Hydro $3.5 billion for co-development rights for two anticipated Churchill River energy projects.

On February 25, 2025, Furey announced that he would be resigning as premier as soon as the Liberal Party of Newfoundland and Labrador elected a successor. In a letter shared publicly, Furey wrote that "it has been my honour to serve as your 14th Premier. With a heart full of pride and confidence in our future, my family and I have decided it is time for me to leave the Premier’s Office." On May 3, 2025, Windsor Lake MHA John Hogan won the 2025 Liberal leadership election. On May 9, 2025, Furey officially was replaced by Hogan as Premier of Newfoundland and Labrador. On July 3, 2025, Furey officially resigned his seat of Humber-Gros Morne in the House of Assembly. His seat was taken by the PC candidate Mike Goosney in the 2025 Newfoundland and Labrador general election.

== Post politics ==
After leaving public office in 2025, Furey continued his work as an orthopedic surgeon.

On March 4, 2026, the National Bank of Canada announced that Furey would take up the role of vice chair on March 16.

On September 15, 2025, Furey was appointed as the independent Director of the Board of New Found Gold, a Vancouver based company with mining interests in Newfoundland.

== Personal life ==
Furey resides in Portugal Cove–St. Philip's. He is married to Allison Furey and they have three children. His wife works as an emergency physician at the Janeway Children's Health and Rehabilitation Centre in St. John's. She was part of a 9-person, federally-funded volunteer team sent to Toronto to help with surging hospitalizations during the COVID-19 pandemic in Ontario in April 2021.

== Electoral record ==
2021 Newfoundland and Labrador general election: Humber-Gros Morne
Party	Candidate	Votes	%	±%
Liberal	Andrew Furey	2,838	63.96	+0.01
Progressive Conservative	Jim Goudie	1,492	33.63	+8.58
New Democratic	Sheina Lerman	107	2.41	+0.14
Total valid votes		4,437	99.48	
Total rejected ballots		23	0.52	
Turnout		4,460	44.83	
Eligible voters		9,948		
Liberal hold		Swing		-4.28
Source(s) "Officially Nominated Candidates General Election 2021" (PDF). Elections Newfoundland and Labrador. "NL Election 2021 (Unofficial Results)".

Humber-Gros Morne - By-election, 6 October 2020 Resignation of Dwight Ball
Party	Candidate	Votes	%	±%
Liberal	Andrew Furey	3,401	63.95	-5.99
Progressive Conservative	Mike Goosney	1,332	25.05	-5.01
NL Alliance	Graydon Pelley	464	8.73	+8.73
New Democratic	Graham Downey-Sutton	121	2.28	+2.28
Total valid votes		5,318	55.11	-13.00
Eligible voters		9,650		
Liberal hold		Swing		-0.49

2020 Liberal Party of Newfoundland and Labrador leadership election
Candidate	Ballot 1	
Name	Votes	Points
Andrew Furey	13,645; 64.42%	26,443; 66.11%
John Abbott	7,537; 35.58%	13,557; 33.89%
Total	21,182	40,000
