= Elections Newfoundland & Labrador =

Elections NL
Agency overview
- Formed: 1991
- Jurisdiction: Elections and plebiscites in Newfoundland and Labrador
- Headquarters: 39 Hallett Crescent St. John's, Newfoundland and Labrador
- Employees: 11
- Annual budget: $5,000,000
- Agency executive: Travis Wooley, Chief Electoral Officer
- Website: Official website

Elections Newfoundland & Labrador is the non-partisan agency of the House of Assembly of Newfoundland and Labrador charged with running provincial elections in Newfoundland and Labrador, Canada.
