= Newfoundland and Labrador House of Assembly =

Legislature of Newfoundland and Labrador, Canada

- 51st General Assembly of Newfoundland and Labrador

Type
- Type: Lower house (1832–1934) then unicameral house of the General Assembly of Newfoundland and Labrador

History
- Founded: 1832; 194 years ago

Leadership
- Speaker: Paul Lane, Independent since 3 November 2025
- Premier: Tony Wakeham, Progressive Conservative since 29 October 2025
- Leader of the Opposition: John Hogan, Liberal since 29 October 2025
- Government House Leader: Lloyd Parrott, Progressive Conservative since 3 November 2025
- Opposition House Leader: Lisa Dempster, Liberal since 3 November 2025

Structure
- Seats: 40
- Political groups: Government (20): Progressive Conservative (20); Official Opposition (15): Liberal (15); Others (5): New Democratic (2); Independent (3)

Elections
- Last election: October 14, 2025
- Next election: On or before October 9, 2029

Meeting place
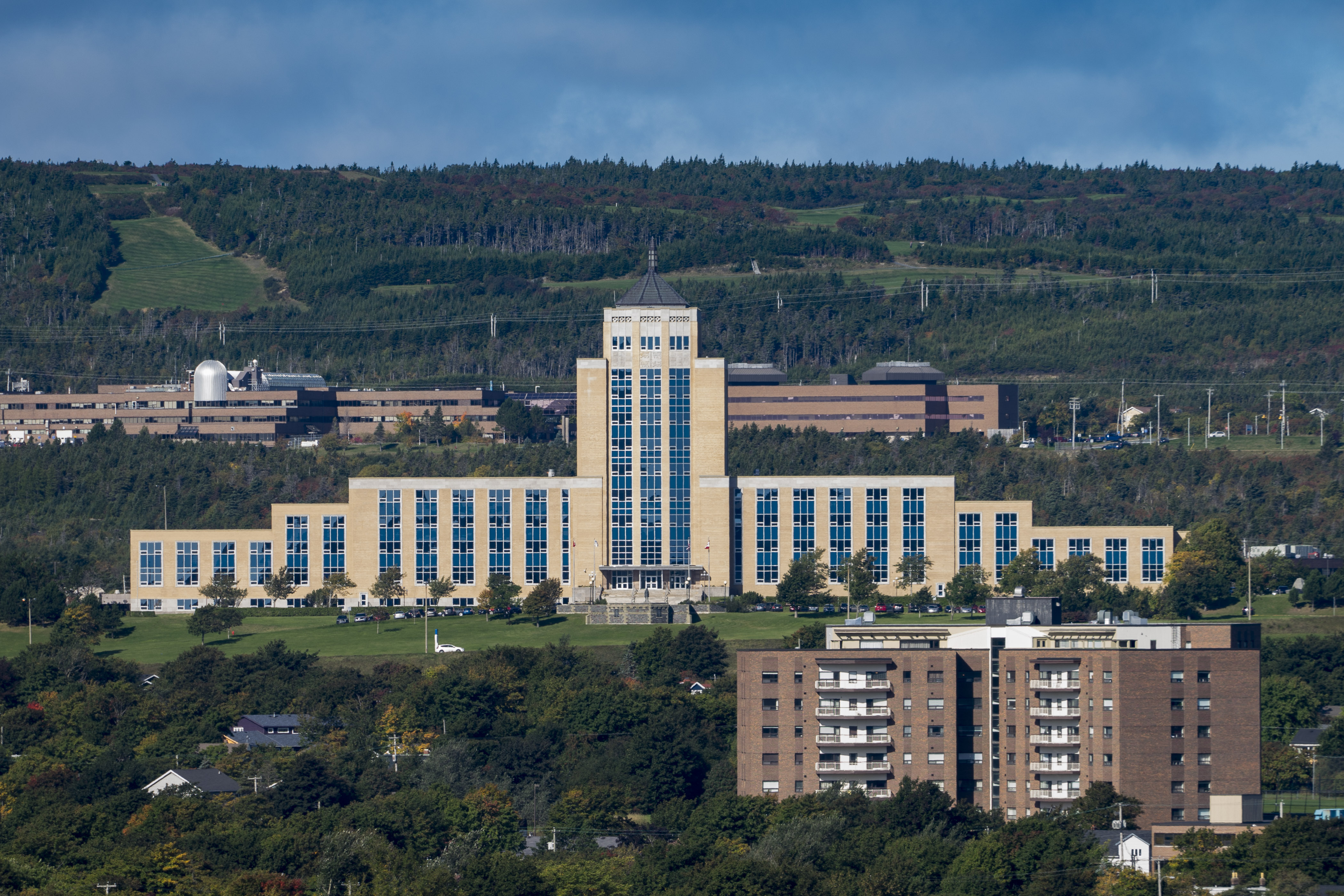
- Colonial Building (1850–1959); Confederation Building (1959–present)

Website
- www.assembly.nl.ca

The Newfoundland and Labrador House of Assembly (French: Chambre d'assemblée de Terre-Neuve-et-Labrador) is the unicameral deliberative assembly of the General Assembly of Newfoundland and Labrador of the province of Newfoundland and Labrador, Canada. It meets in the Confederation Building in St. John's. Bills passed by the assembly are given royal assent by the lieutenant governor of Newfoundland and Labrador, in the name of the Sovereign.

The governing party sits on the left side of the speaker of the House of Assembly as opposed to the traditional right side of the speaker. This tradition dates back to the 1850s as the heaters in the Colonial Building were located on the left side. Thus, the government chose to sit near the heat, and leave the opposition sitting in the cold.

== Homes of Legislature ==
Before 1850 the legislature has sat at various locations including Mary Travers's tavern on Duckworth Street across from War Memorial 1832, St. John's Court House (at Duckworth and Church Hill) from 1833 to 1846, a building on southwest corner of Water Street and Prescott Street (since replaced with office building) and the site of the former St. Patrick's Hall on Queen's Road and Garrison Hill (demolished and replace by current building 1880).

Permanent homes of the legislature, Confederation Building and Colonial Building, are the only surviving structures.

== Constituencies ==
Members represent one electoral district each. There are 40 seats in the House of Assembly.

== Current members (MHAs) ==
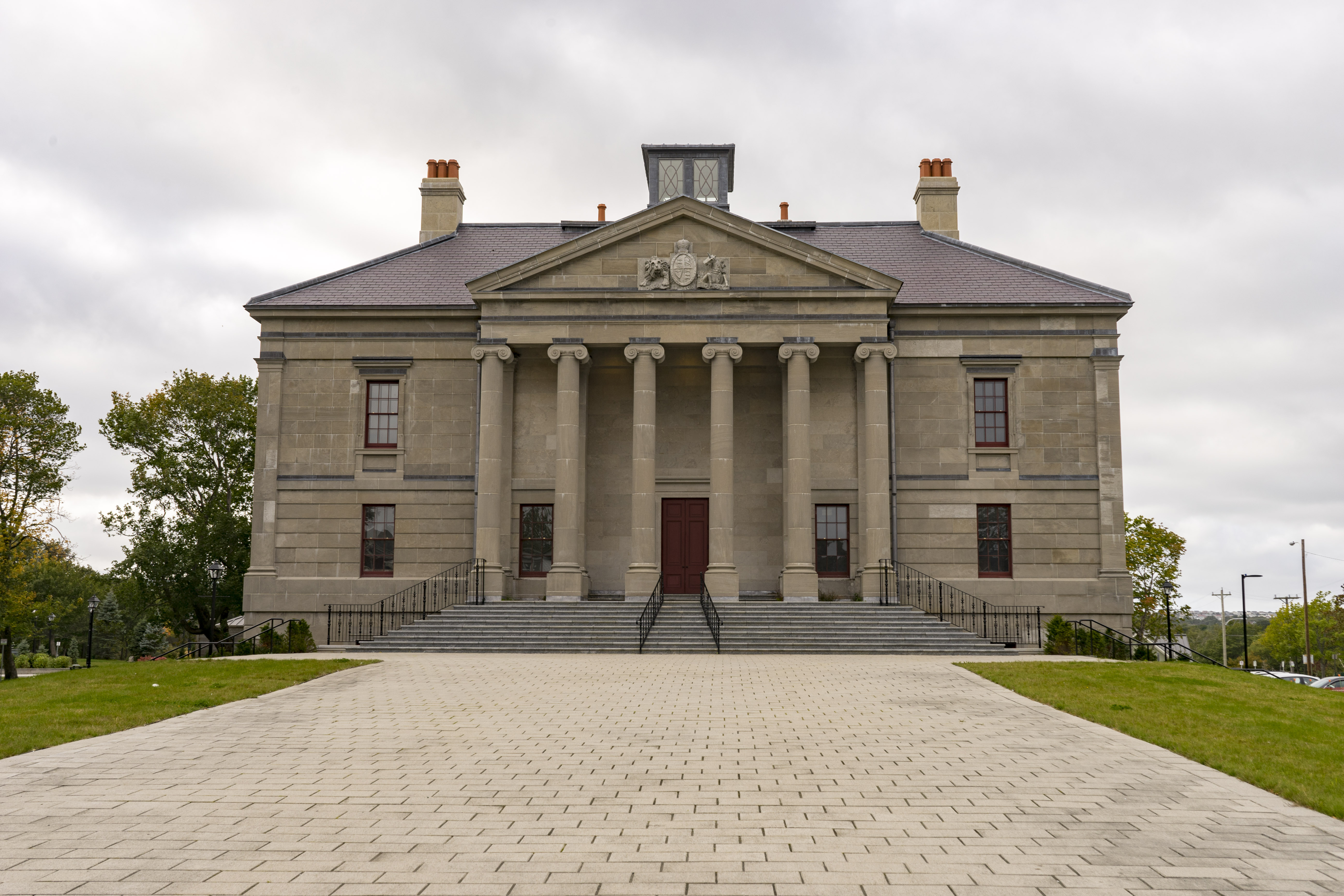
Colonial Building, the House of Assembly of the Dominion of Newfoundland

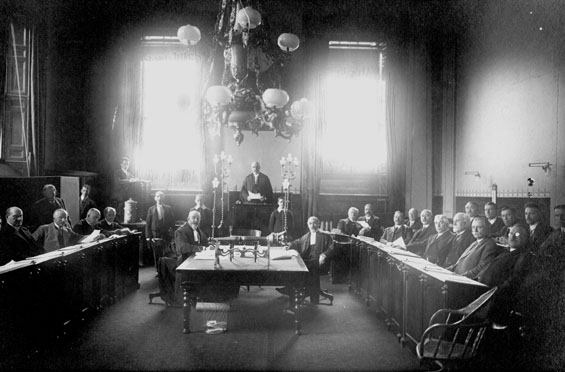
Newfoundland House of Assembly in Colonial Building, ca. 1914

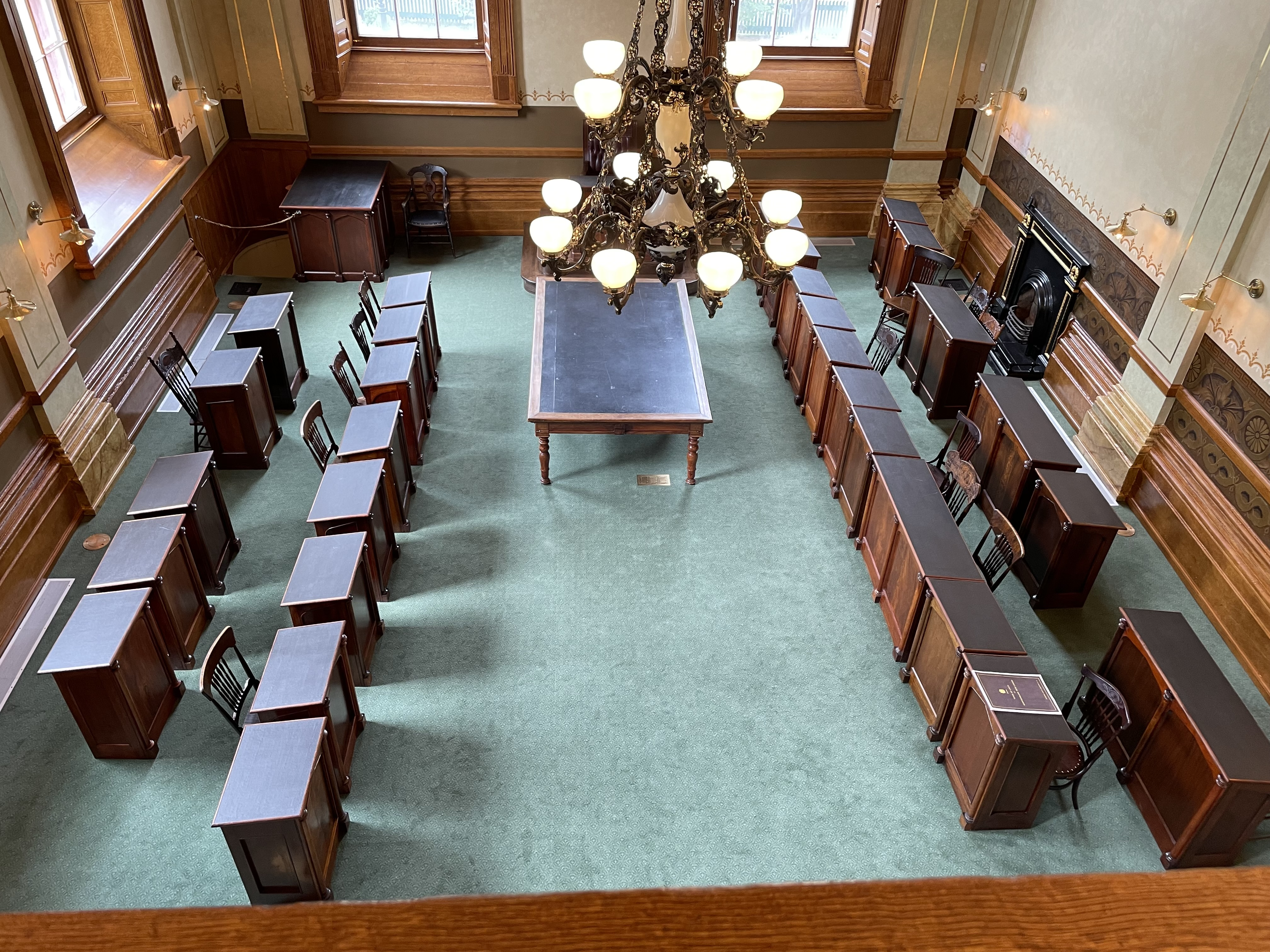
View of the House of Assembly in 2024

Party leaders' names are written in bold and cabinet ministers in italic, with the Speaker of the House of Assembly designated by a dagger (†).

Riding	Name	Party	First elected / previously elected
Baie Verte-Green Bay	Lin Paddock	Progressive Conservative	2024
Bonavista	Craig Pardy	Progressive Conservative	2019
Burgeo-La Poile	Michael King	Liberal	2025
Burin-Grand Bank	Paul Pike	Liberal	2021
Cape St. Francis	Joedy Wall	Progressive Conservative	2021
Carbonear-Trinity-Bay de Verde	Riley Balsom	Progressive Conservative	2025
Cartwright-L'Anse au Clair	Lisa Dempster	Liberal	2013
Conception Bay East–Bell Island	Fred Hutton	Liberal	2024
Conception Bay South	Barry Petten	Progressive Conservative	2015
Corner Brook	Jim Parsons	Liberal	2025
Exploits	Pleaman Forsey	Progressive Conservative	2019
Ferryland	Loyola O'Driscoll	Progressive Conservative	2019
Fogo Island-Cape Freels	Jim McKenna	Progressive Conservative	2024
Fortune Bay-Cape La Hune	Elvis Loveless	Liberal	2019
Gander	Bettina Ford	Liberal	2025
Grand Falls-Windsor-Buchans	Chris Tibbs	Progressive Conservative	2019
Harbour Grace-Port de Grave	Pam Parsons	Liberal	2015
Harbour Main	Helen Conway-Ottenheimer	Progressive Conservative	2019
Humber-Bay of Islands	Eddie Joyce	Independent	1989, (Note: First elected as a Liberal) 1999, (Note: Re-elected as Liberal) 2011
Humber-Gros Morne	Mike Goosney	Progressive Conservative	2025
Labrador West	Joseph Power	Progressive Conservative	2025
Lake Melville	Keith Russell	Progressive Conservative	2011, 2025
Lake Melville	Keith Russell	Independent (Note: First elected as a Progressive Conservative, crossed the floor to independent in September 2026.)	2011, 2025
Lewisporte-Twillingate	Mark Butt	Progressive Conservative	2025
Mount Pearl North	Lucy Stoyles	Liberal	2021
Mount Pearl-Southlands	Paul Lane	Independent	2011 (Note: First elected as a Progressive Conservative and re-elected as Liberal)
Mount Scio	Sarah Stoodley	Liberal	2019
Placentia West-Bellevue	Jeff Dwyer	Progressive Conservative	2019
Placentia-St. Mary's	Sherry Gambin-Walsh	Liberal	2015
St. Barbe-L'Anse aux Meadows	Andrea Barbour	Progressive Conservative	2025
St. George's-Humber	Hal Cormier	Progressive Conservative	2025
St. John's Centre	Jim Dinn	New Democratic	2019
St. John's East-Quidi Vidi	Sheilagh O'Leary	New Democratic	2025
St. John's West	Keith White	Liberal	2025
Stephenville-Port au Port	Tony Wakeham	Progressive Conservative	2019
Terra Nova	Lloyd Parrott	Progressive Conservative	2019
Topsail-Paradise	Paul Dinn	Progressive Conservative	2019
Torngat Mountains	Lela Evans	Progressive Conservative	2019
Virginia Waters-Pleasantville	Bernard Davis	Liberal	2015
Waterford Valley	Jamie Korab	Liberal	2024
Windsor Lake	John Hogan	Liberal	2021

== Seat totals ==
Summary of the current standings of the House of Assembly of Newfoundland and Labrador
Party	Leader	Seats	
Party	Leader	October 14, 2025	Current
Progressive Conservative	Tony Wakeham	21	20
Liberal	John Hogan	15	15
New Democratic	Jim Dinn	2	2
Independent	N/A	2	3
Vacant	N/A	0	0
Members		40	40

== See also ==
- 50th General Assembly of Newfoundland and Labrador
- 48th General Assembly of Newfoundland and Labrador
- 47th General Assembly of Newfoundland and Labrador
- Speaker of the House of Assembly of Newfoundland and Labrador
- List of Newfoundland and Labrador General Assemblies
