= Graydon Pelley =

Canadian politician

Leader of the NL Alliance
- In office November 14, 2018 – February 13, 2023
- Preceded by: Office Established
- Succeeded by: Office Abolished

President of the Progressive Conservative Party of Newfoundland and Labrador
- In office 2016–2018
- Preceded by: Mark Whiffen
- Succeeded by: Charlotte Halleran

Personal details
- Party: NL Alliance (2018–2023)
- Other political affiliations: Progressive Conservative Party of Newfoundland and Labrador (2015–2018)

Graydon Pelley is a Canadian politician who served as the first and only leader of the NL Alliance. Graydon ran unsuccessfully in Humber-Gros Morne under the PC banner in 2015, losing to Dwight Ball. In 2016, he became president of the PC party until his resignation in 2018.

== NL Alliance ==
In November 2018, the NL Alliance was formed, and on April 12, 2019, became an officially registered party with Elections NL.

In 2019, he ran unsuccessfully the district of Mount Scio under the NL Alliance banner and losing to Sarah Stoodley. In 2020, He ran in the Humber-Gros More by-election under the NL Alliance banner but lost to Andrew Furey. He was going to run in Humber Gros-Morne in the 2021 Newfoundland & Labrador general election but dropped out due to medical reasons.

On February 13, 2023, Graydon Pelley and NL Alliance president, Rudy Norman, resigned from their positions. A month later, on March 30, 2023, the party was officially de-registered.

== Electoral record ==
Humber-Gros Morne - 2020 Humber-Gros Morne provincial by-election, 6 October 2020 Resignation of Dwight Ball
Party	Candidate	Votes	%	±%
Liberal	Andrew Furey	3,401	63.95	-5.99
Progressive Conservative	Mike Goosney	1,332	25.05	-5.01
NL Alliance	Graydon Pelley	464	8.73	+8.73
New Democratic	Graham Downey-Sutton	121	2.28	+2.28
Total valid votes		5,318		
Liberal hold		Swing		-0.49

2019 Newfoundland and Labrador general election
Party	Candidate	Votes	%	±%
Liberal	Sarah Stoodley	1,981	41.68	-5.41
Progressive Conservative	Lloyd Power	1,769	37.22	+9.84
New Democratic	Jason R. Mercer	597	12.56	-12.98
NL Alliance	Graydon Pelley	406	8.54	
Total valid votes		4,753	99.69	
Total rejected ballots		15	0.31	-0.08
Turnout		4,768	54.51	+7.69
Electors on the lists		8,747	–	
Liberal hold		Swing		-7.63
Source: Elections Canada

2015 Newfoundland and Labrador general election
Party	Candidate	Votes	%
Liberal	Dwight Ball	4,610	75.98
Progressive Conservative	Graydon Pelley	983	16.20
New Democratic	Mike Goosney	474	7.81
Total valid votes		6,067	99.72
Total rejected ballots		17	0.28
Turnout		6,084	64.64
Eligible voters		9,412	
