= 51st General Assembly of Newfoundland and Labrador =

Canadian provincial legislature since 2025

- Minority parliament
- Oct. 29, 2025 – present

Parliament leaders
- Premier: Tony Wakeham; Oct. 29, 2025 – present
- Cabinet: Wakeham ministry
- Leader of the Opposition: John Hogan; Oct. 29, 2025 – present

Party caucuses
- Government: Progressive Conservative
- Opposition: Liberal
- Recognized: New Democratic

House of Assembly
- Speaker of the House: Paul Lane; Nov. 3, 2025 – present
- Members: 40 MHA seats

Sovereign
- Monarch: Charles III; Sep. 8, 2022 – present
- Lieutenant governor: Joan Marie Aylward; Nov. 14, 2023 – present
← 50th	→ 52nd

The 51st General Assembly of Newfoundland and Labrador was elected at the 2025 Newfoundland and Labrador general election. All 40 seats were elected.

== Party total ==
Party	Seats
Progressive Conservative	20
Liberal	15
New Democratic	2
Independent	3

== List of members ==
Riding	Name	Party	First elected / previously elected
Baie Verte-Green Bay	Lin Paddock	Progressive Conservative	2024
Bonavista	Craig Pardy	Progressive Conservative	2019
Burgeo-La Poile	Michael King	Liberal	2025
Burin-Grand Bank	Paul Pike	Liberal	2021
Cape St. Francis	Joedy Wall	Progressive Conservative	2021
Carbonear-Trinity-Bay de Verde	Riley Balsom	Progressive Conservative	2025
Cartwright-L'Anse au Clair	Lisa Dempster	Liberal	2013
Conception Bay East–Bell Island	Fred Hutton	Liberal	2024
Conception Bay South	Barry Petten	Progressive Conservative	2015
Corner Brook	Jim Parsons	Liberal	2025
Exploits	Pleaman Forsey	Progressive Conservative	2019
Ferryland	Loyola O'Driscoll	Progressive Conservative	2019
Fogo Island-Cape Freels	Jim McKenna	Progressive Conservative	2024
Fortune Bay-Cape La Hune	Elvis Loveless	Liberal	2019
Gander	Bettina Ford	Liberal	2025
Grand Falls-Windsor-Buchans	Chris Tibbs	Progressive Conservative	2019
Harbour Grace-Port de Grave	Pam Parsons	Liberal	2015
Harbour Main	Helen Conway-Ottenheimer	Progressive Conservative	2019
Humber-Bay of Islands	Eddie Joyce	Independent	1989, (Note: First Elected as a Liberal) 1999, (Note: Re-elected as Liberal) 2011
Humber-Gros Morne	Mike Goosney	Progressive Conservative	2025
Labrador West	Joseph Power	Progressive Conservative	2025
Lake Melville	Keith Russell	Progressive Conservative	2011, 2025
Lake Melville	Keith Russell	Independent (Note: First elected as a Progressive Conservative, crossed the floor to independent in September 2026.)	2011, 2025
Lewisporte-Twillingate	Mark Butt	Progressive Conservative	2025
Mount Pearl North	Lucy Stoyles	Liberal	2021
Mount Pearl-Southlands	Paul Lane	Independent	2011 (Note: First Elected as a Progressive Conservative and Re-elected as Liberal)
Mount Scio	Sarah Stoodley	Liberal	2019
Placentia West-Bellevue	Jeff Dwyer	Progressive Conservative	2019
Placentia-St. Mary's	Sherry Gambin-Walsh	Liberal	2015
St. Barbe-L'Anse aux Meadows	Andrea Barbour	Progressive Conservative	2025
St. George's-Humber	Hal Cormier	Progressive Conservative	2025
St. John's Centre	Jim Dinn	New Democratic	2019
St. John's East-Quidi Vidi	Sheilagh O'Leary	New Democratic	2025
St. John's West	Keith White	Liberal	2025
Stephenville-Port au Port	Tony Wakeham	Progressive Conservative	2019
Terra Nova	Lloyd Parrott	Progressive Conservative	2019
Topsail-Paradise	Paul Dinn	Progressive Conservative	2019
Torngat Mountains	Lela Evans	Progressive Conservative	2019
Virginia Waters-Pleasantville	Bernard Davis	Liberal	2015
Waterford Valley	Jamie Korab	Liberal	2024
Windsor Lake	John Hogan	Liberal	2021
