= 48th General Assembly of Newfoundland and Labrador =

- Majority parliament
- March 8, 2016 – April 17, 2019

Parliament leaders
- Premier: Hon. Dwight Ball; December 14, 2015 - April 17, 2019
- Leader of the Opposition: Paul Davis; December 14, 2015 - May 14, 2018
- David Brazil; May 14, 2018 - September 20, 2018
- Ches Crosbie; September 20, 2018 - April 17, 2019

Party caucuses
- Government: Liberal Party
- Opposition: Progressive Conservative Party
- Recognized: New Democratic Party

House of Assembly
- Seating arrangements of the House of Assembly
- Members: 40 MHA seats

Sovereign
- Monarch: Elizabeth II; 6 February 1952 – present
← 47th	→ 49th

The 48th Newfoundland and Labrador House of Assembly was elected on November 30, 2015. Members of the House of Assembly were sworn in December 14, 2015. The Liberals under Dwight Ball had a majority government during this parliament which lasted until the 2019 provincial election.

== Members ==
Name	Party	Riding	First elected / previously elected
Brian Warr	Liberal	Baie Verte-Green Bay	2015
Neil King	Liberal	Bonavista	2015
Andrew Parsons	Liberal	Burgeo-La Poile	2011
Carol Anne Haley	Liberal	Burin-Grand Bank	2015
Kevin Parsons	Progressive Conservative	Cape St. Francis	2008
Steve Crocker	Liberal	Carbonear-Trinity-Bay de Verde	2014
Lisa Dempster	Liberal	Cartwright-L'Anse au Clair	2013
David Brazil	Progressive Conservative	Conception Bay East-Bell Island	2010
Barry Petten	Progressive Conservative	Conception Bay South	2015
Gerry Byrne	Liberal	Corner Brook	2015
Jerry Dean	Liberal	Exploits	2015
Keith Hutchings	Progressive Conservative	Ferryland	2007
Derrick Bragg	Liberal	Fogo Island-Cape Freels	2015
Tracey Perry	Progressive Conservative	Fortune Bay-Cape La Hune	2007
John Haggie	Liberal	Gander	2015
Al Hawkins	Liberal	Grand Falls-Windsor-Buchans	2015
Pam Parsons	Liberal	Harbour Grace-Port de Grave	2015
Betty Parsley	Liberal	Harbour Main	2015
Eddie Joyce	Liberal (2015-2018)	Humber-Bay of Islands	1989, 1999, 2011
Eddie Joyce	Independent (2018-)	Humber-Bay of Islands	1989, 1999, 2011
Dwight Ball	Liberal	Humber-Gros Morne	2007, 2011
Graham Letto	Liberal	Labrador West	2015
Perry Trimper	Liberal	Lake Melville	2015
Derek Bennett	Liberal	Lewisporte-Twillingate	2015
Steve Kent	Progressive Conservative	Mount Pearl North	2007
Jim Lester (2017)	Progressive Conservative	Mount Pearl North	2017
Paul Lane	Liberal (2015-2016)	Mount Pearl-Southlands	2011 (Note: First Elected as a Progressive Conservative)
Paul Lane	Independent (2016-)	Mount Pearl-Southlands	2011
Dale Kirby	Liberal (2015-2018)	Mount Scio	2011
Dale Kirby	Independent (2018-)	Mount Scio	2011
Sherry Gambin-Walsh	Liberal	Placentia and St. Mary's	2015
Mark Browne	Liberal	Placentia West-Bellevue	2015
Christopher Mitchelmore	Liberal	St. Barbe-L'Anse aux Meadows	2011
Scott Reid	Liberal	St. George's-Humber	2014
Gerry Rogers	New Democratic	St. John's Centre	2011
Lorraine Michael	New Democratic	St. John's East-Quidi Vidi	2006
Siobhán Coady	Liberal	St. John's West	2015
John Finn	Liberal	Stephenville-Port au Port	2015
Colin Holloway	Liberal	Terra Nova	2015
Paul Davis	Progressive Conservative	Topsail-Paradise	2010
Paul Dinn (2019)	Progressive Conservative	Topsail-Paradise	2019
Randy Edmunds	Liberal	Torngat Mountains	2011
Bernard Davis	Liberal	Virginia Waters-Pleasantville	2015
Tom Osborne	Liberal	Waterford Valley	1996
Cathy Bennett	Liberal (2015-2018)	Windsor Lake	2014
Ches Crosbie	Progressive Conservative (2018-)	Windsor Lake	2018

== Seating plan ==
=== Standings changes in the 48th Assembly ===
Number of members per party by date	2015	2016	2017		2018			
Number of members per party by date	Nov 30	May 19	Oct 11	Nov 21	Apr 25	Apr 28	Aug 21	Sep 20
Liberal	31	30			29	28	27	
Progressive Conservative	7		6	7				8
NDP	2							
Independent	0	1			2	3		
Total members	40		39	40			39	40
Vacant	0		1	0			1	0
Government Majority	22	20	21	20	18	16	15	14

Membership changes in the 48th Assembly
Date	Name	District	Party	Reason
November 30, 2015	See List of Members			Election day of the 2015 Newfoundland and Labrador general election
May 19, 2016	Paul Lane	Mount Pearl-Southlands	Independent	Suspended from the Liberal caucus
April 25, 2018	Eddie Joyce	Humber-Bay of Islands	Independent	Suspended from Cabinet & the Liberal caucus
April 30, 2018	Dale Kirby	Mount Scio	Independent	Suspended from Cabinet & the Liberal caucus
