= 49th General Assembly of Newfoundland and Labrador =

- Minority parliament
- Jun. 10, 2019 – Jan. 15, 2021

Parliament leaders
- Premier: Hon. Dwight Ball; 10 June 2019 - 19 August 2020
- Hon. Andrew Furey; 19 August 2020 - January 15, 2021
- Leader of the Opposition: Ches Crosbie; 10 June 2019 - January 15, 2021

Party caucuses
- Government: Liberal Party
- Opposition: Progressive Conservative Party
- Recognized: New Democratic Party
- Members: 40 MHA seats

Sovereign
- Monarch: Elizabeth II; 6 February 1952 – present

Sessions
- 1st session 10 June 2019 – 15 January 2021
← 48th	→ 50th

The 49th General Assembly of Newfoundland and Labrador was elected on May 16, 2019. Members of the House of Assembly were sworn in on June 10, 2019. The Assembly was dissolved on January 15, 2021 after Premier Andrew Furey called a snap election held on February 13.

== Seating plan ==
Stoodley	Loveless
Bennett	Davis	Haley	Gambin-Walsh	Mitchelmore	Warr	Bragg	P. Parsons
Dempster	Osborne	FUREY	Coady	Crocker	Haggie	Byrne	A. Parsons
Reid
Lester	Wakeham	CROSBIE	Brazil	Petten	Parsons	COFFIN	J. Dinn	Brown
Dwyer	Evans	Conway-Ottenheimer	P. Dinn	Pardy	Parrott
O'Driscoll	Tibbs	Forsey	Joyce	Trimper	Lane

== List of members ==
Name	Party	Riding	First elected / previously elected
Brian Warr	Liberal	Baie Verte-Green Bay	2015
Craig Pardy	Progressive Conservative	Bonavista	2019
Andrew Parsons	Liberal	Burgeo-La Poile	2011
Carol Anne Haley	Liberal	Burin-Grand Bank	2015
Kevin Parsons	Progressive Conservative	Cape St. Francis	2008
Steve Crocker	Liberal	Carbonear-Trinity-Bay de Verde	2014
Lisa Dempster	Liberal	Cartwright-L'Anse au Clair	2013
David Brazil	Progressive Conservative	Conception Bay East-Bell Island	2010
Barry Petten	Progressive Conservative	Conception Bay South	2015
Gerry Byrne	Liberal	Corner Brook	2015
Pleaman Forsey	Progressive Conservative	Exploits	2019
Loyola O'Driscoll	Progressive Conservative	Ferryland	2019
Derrick Bragg	Liberal	Fogo Island-Cape Freels	2015
Elvis Loveless	Liberal	Fortune Bay-Cape La Hune	2019
John Haggie	Liberal	Gander	2015
Chris Tibbs	Progressive Conservative	Grand Falls-Windsor-Buchans	2019
Pam Parsons	Liberal	Harbour Grace-Port de Grave	2015
Helen Conway-Ottenheimer	Progressive Conservative	Harbour Main	2019
Eddie Joyce	Independent	Humber-Bay of Islands	1989, (Note: First Elected as a Liberal) 1999, (Note: Re-elected as Liberal) 2011
Dwight Ball	Liberal	Humber-Gros Morne	2007, 2011
Andrew Furey (2020)	Liberal	Humber-Gros Morne	2020
Jordan Brown	New Democratic	Labrador West	2019
Perry Trimper	Liberal	Lake Melville	2015
Perry Trimper	Independent	Lake Melville	2015
Derek Bennett	Liberal	Lewisporte-Twillingate	2015
Jim Lester	Progressive Conservative	Mount Pearl North	2017
Paul Lane	Independent	Mount Pearl-Southlands	2011 (Note: First Elected as a Progressive Conservative and Re-elected as Liberal)
Sarah Stoodley	Liberal	Mount Scio	2019
Jeff Dwyer	Progressive Conservative	Placentia West-Bellevue	2019
Sherry Gambin-Walsh	Liberal	Placentia-St. Mary's	2015
Christopher Mitchelmore	Liberal	St. Barbe-L'Anse aux Meadows	2011
Scott Reid †	Liberal	St. George's-Humber	2014
Jim Dinn	New Democratic	St. John's Centre	2019
Alison Coffin	New Democratic	St. John's East-Quidi Vidi	2019
Siobhán Coady	Liberal	St. John's West	2015
Tony Wakeham	Progressive Conservative	Stephenville-Port au Port	2019
Lloyd Parrott	Progressive Conservative	Terra Nova	2019
Paul Dinn	Progressive Conservative	Topsail-Paradise	2019
Lela Evans	Progressive Conservative	Torngat Mountains	2019
Bernard Davis	Liberal	Virginia Waters-Pleasantville	2015
Tom Osborne	Liberal	Waterford Valley	1996 (Note: First Elected as a Progressive Conservative)
Ches Crosbie	Progressive Conservative	Windsor Lake	2018
