= 2021 Newfoundland and Labrador general election =

Canadian provincial election

- March 25, 2021 (Note: This is the finalized date for mail-in ballots to be received by Elections NL. The original election date, as decreed by the writ, was February 13, 2021.)

All 40 seats in the House of Assembly of Newfoundland and Labrador 21 seats needed for a majority
- Opinion polls
- Turnout: 51.4% (▼9.3 pp)
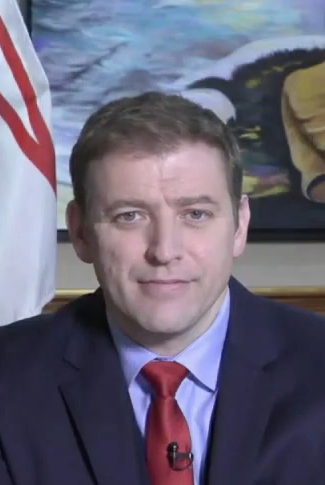

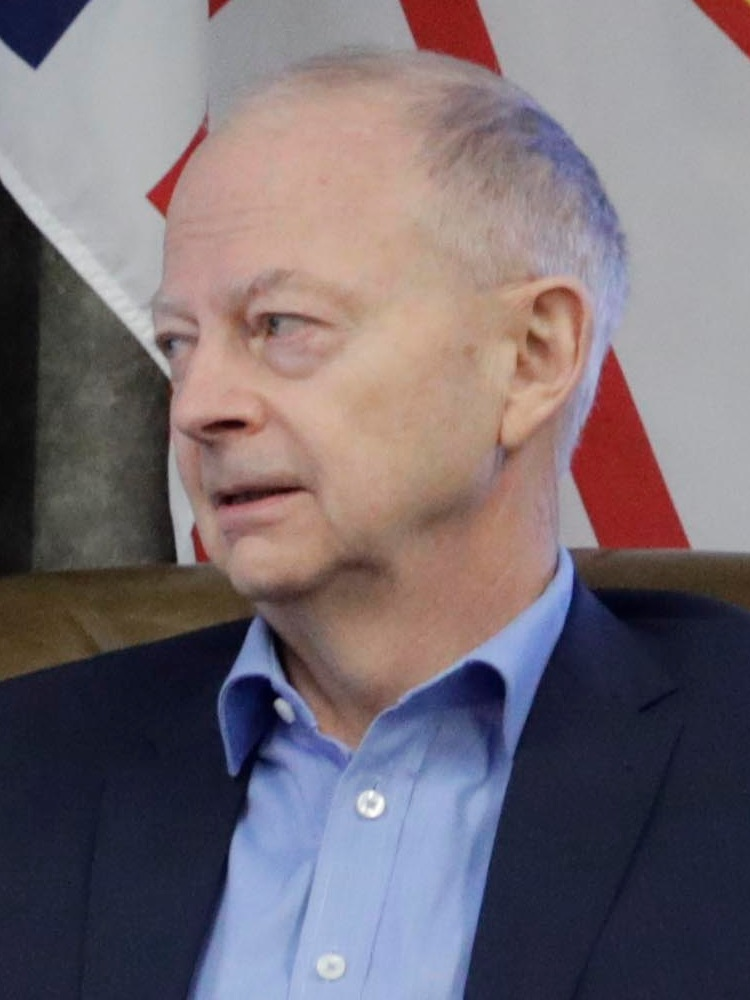

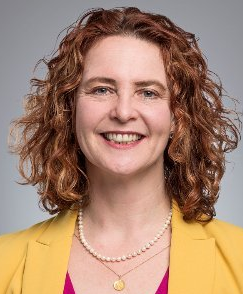
	First party	Second party	Third party
Leader	Andrew Furey	Ches Crosbie	Alison Coffin
Party	Liberal	Progressive Conservative	New Democratic
Leader since	August 3, 2020	April 28, 2018	March 5, 2019
Leader's seat	Humber-Gros Morne	Windsor Lake (lost re-election)	St. John's East-Quidi Vidi (lost re-election)
Last election	20 seats, 43.9%	15 seats, 42.6%	3 seats, 6.3%
Seats before	19	15	3
Seats won	22	13	2
Seat change	▲3	▼2	▼1
Popular vote	86,180	69,314	14,324
Percentage	48.24%	38.80%	8.02%
Swing	▲4.24pp	▼3.76pp	▲1.71pp
- Map of the 2021 Newfoundland and Labrador Election.
Premier before election
Andrew Furey
Liberal
Premier after election
Andrew Furey
Liberal

The 2021 Newfoundland and Labrador general election was held on March 25, 2021, to elect members of the 50th General Assembly of Newfoundland and Labrador.

Under the province's fixed election date law, the vote was tentatively scheduled for October 10, 2023, but a caveat in the law mandates that an election must be held within one year of a new Premier assuming office. Premier Furey assumed the role on August 19, 2020, and requested to Lieutenant Governor Judy Foote to issue the writs of election on January 15, 2021.

However, an unexpected COVID-19 surge in the week leading up to the election caused voting to be delayed on the Avalon Peninsula, before all in-person voting was eventually cancelled, delaying the election for every district until March 1, 2021. After several more delays, the final mail-in ballot deadline became March 25, 2021. The election was the first election in Canada that was mostly mail-in-only, however, there was one day of advance voting. Preliminary results were released by noon on March 27, which projected a majority government for Andrew Furey and the Liberal Party.

== Incumbents not running for re-election ==
The following MHAs had announced that they would not be running in this provincial election:

Liberal

- Carol Anne Haley (Burin-Grand Bank)
- Christopher Mitchelmore (St. Barbe-L'Anse aux Meadows)

Progressive Conservative

- Kevin Parsons (Cape St. Francis)

== Results ==
The Liberals regained their parliamentary majority. The PC and NDP leaders lost their seats in the legislature. On March 31, 2021, Ches Crosbie resigned as PC leader.

NDP leader Coffin filed for a recount in her district. On May 12, 2021, Supreme Court Justice Donald Burrage rejected Coffin's bid for a recount, arguing that there was not sufficient evidence. On October 16, 2021, Coffin lost a leadership review by party members. She later chose to resign on October 19 and was replaced by MHA Jim Dinn as interim leader.

Defeated PC candidates Jim Lester and Sheila Fitzgerald also filed legal challenges to the results in their respective districts.

The election was noteworthy in the election of 3 independent candidates, the most of any past election.

Summary of the House of Assembly of Newfoundland and Labrador election results
Party	Votes	%	+/–	Seats			
Party	Votes	%	+/–	2019	Dissol.	2021	Change
Liberal	86,180	48.24	+4.24	20	19	22	+2
Progressive Conservative	69,314	38.80	-3.76	15	15	13	-2
New Democratic	14,324	8.02	+1.71	3	3	2	-1
NL Alliance	557	0.31	-2.08	0	0	0	±0
Independents	8,257	4.62	-0.12	2	3	3	+1
Total	178,632	100.00	–	40	40	40	0

=== Historical results from 1993 onwards ===
Graph of NL general election results by share of votes, 1993–2021; omitted are minor parties consistently registering less than 2% of the vote.
Graph of NL general election results by seats won, 1993–2021; those of independent MHAs are omitted.

=== Synopsis of results ===
2021 Newfoundland and Labrador general election - synopsis of riding results
Riding (Note: sorted as per results summary)	2019	Winning party					Turnout (Note: including rejected and declined ballots)	Votes					
Riding	2019	Party	Votes	Share	Margin #	Margin %	Turnout	Lib	PC	NDP	NL All	Ind	Total
Baie Verte-Green Bay	Lib	Lib	2,158	52.1%	171	4.2%	42.1%	2,158	1,987	–	–	–	4,145
Bonavista	PC	PC	2,117	57.3%	1,173	31.7%	40.5%	944	2,117	70	–	562	3,693
Burgeo-La Poile	Lib	Lib	1,992	87.1%	1,757	76.8%	33.5%	1,992	235	60	–	–	2,287
Burin-Grand Bank	Lib	Lib	2,666	59.6%	1,027	23.0%	50.5%	2,666	1,639	169	–	–	4,474
Cape St. Francis	PC	PC	3,476	62.5%	1,905	34.3%	58.1%	1,571	3,476	449	65	–	5,561
Carbonear-Trinity-Bay de Verde	Lib	Lib	3,892	67.5%	2,296	39.8%	51.5%	3,892	1,596	261	–	14	5,763
Cartwright-L'Anse au Clair	Lib	Lib	973	95.2%	924	90.4%	35.3%	973	49	–	–	–	1,022
Conception Bay East – Bell Island	PC	PC	3,215	56.2%	1,322	23.1%	50.1%	1,893	3,215	614	–	–	5,722
Conception Bay South	PC	PC	3,063	57.1%	1,122	20.9%	55.5%	1,941	3,063	225	136	–	5,365
Corner Brook	Lib	Lib	2,593	66.5%	1,289	33.0%	38.4%	2,593	1,304	–	–	–	3,897
Exploits	PC	PC	2,641	54.8%	463	9.6%	51.5%	2,178	2,641	–	–	–	4,819
Ferryland	PC	PC	3,197	52.3%	501	8.2%	58.7%	2,696	3,197	216	–	–	6,109
Fogo Island-Cape Freels	Lib	Lib	2,511	61.1%	1,004	24.5%	40.7%	2,511	1,507	95	–	–	4,113
Fortune Bay-Cape La Hune	Lib	Lib	1,868	68.2%	1,087	39.7%	51.0%	1,868	781	89	–	–	2,738
Gander	Lib	Lib	3,358	70.9%	2,130	45.0%	47.9%	3,358	1,228	148	–	–	4,734
Grand Falls-Windsor-Buchans	PC	PC	2,735	59.2%	959	20.7%	47.8%	1,776	2,735	106	–	–	4,617
Harbour Grace-Port de Grave	Lib	Lib	3,404	71.1%	2,235	46.7%	44.3%	3,404	1,169	215	–	–	4,788
Harbour Main	PC	PC	3,180	54.5%	750	12.9%	53.7%	2,430	3,180	228	–	–	5,838
Humber-Bay of Islands	Ind	Ind	2,988	71.6%	2,247	53.8%	41.0%	741	444	–	–	2,988	4,173
Humber-Gros Morne	Lib	Lib	2,838	64.0%	1,346	30.4%	44.8%	2,838	1,492	107	–	–	4,437
Labrador West	NDP	NDP	1,359	50.0%	579	21.3%	43.2%	780	577	1,359	–	–	2,716
Lake Melville (Note: multiple independent candidates nominated)	Lib	Ind	1,143	49.9%	596	26.0%	46.8%	306	547	279	–	1,160	2,292
Lewisporte-Twillingate	Lib	Lib	2,593	62.4%	1,033	24.8%	41.1%	2,593	1,560	–	–	–	4,153
Mount Pearl North	PC	Lib	2,428	46.7%	109	2.1%	49.6%	2,428	2,319	337	116	–	5,200
Mount Pearl-Southlands	Ind	Ind	3,445	59.6%	2,059	35.6%	54.6%	1,386	797	152	–	3,445	5,780
Mount Scio	Lib	Lib	2,011	46.6%	859	19.9%	46.8%	2,011	1,152	1,074	60	18	4,315
Placentia-St. Mary's	Lib	Lib	2,552	50.8%	216	4.2%	54.3%	2,552	2,336	–	131	–	5,019
Placentia West-Bellevue	PC	PC	2,965	54.3%	661	12.1%	56.8%	2,304	2,965	189	–	–	5,458
St. Barbe-L'Anse aux Meadows	Lib	Lib	2,375	51.2%	216	4.7%	51.3%	2,375	2,159	38	–	70	4,642
St. George's-Humber	Lib	Lib	2,420	58.5%	946	22.8%	43.7%	2,420	1,474	191	49	–	4,134
St. John's Centre	NDP	NDP	1,991	52.4%	714	18.8%	38.9%	1,277	533	1,991	–	–	3,801
St. John's East-Quidi Vidi	NDP	Lib	2,447	43.0%	53	1.0%	50.8%	2,447	856	2,394	–	–	5,697
St. John's West	Lib	Lib	2,679	57.8%	1,195	25.8%	49.1%	2,679	1,484	470	–	–	4,633
Stephenville-Port au Port	PC	PC	2,481	59.7%	907	21.8%	43.4%	1,574	2,481	103	–	–	4,158
Terra Nova	PC	PC	2,837	53.2%	514	9.6%	53.2%	2,323	2,837	173	–	–	5,333
Topsail-Paradise	PC	PC	3,036	50.6%	511	8.5%	55.6%	2,525	3,036	440	–	–	6,001
Torngat Mountains	PC	PC	420	88.8%	383	81.0%	22.5%	16	420	37	–	–	473
Virginia Waters-Pleasantville	Lib	Lib	3,481	59.6%	2,257	38.6%	56.8%	3,481	1,224	1,135	–	–	5,840
Waterford Valley	Lib	Lib	3,592	66.8%	2,244	41.7%	52.8%	3,592	1,348	438	–	–	5,378
Windsor Lake	PC	Lib	2,688	50.6%	534	10.1%	56.7%	2,688	2,154	472	–	–	5,314

= open seat
= turnout is above provincial average
= incumbent re-elected in same riding
= incumbent changed allegiance
= other incumbent renominated

=== Comparative analysis for ridings (2021 vs 2019) ===
==== Analytical charts ====
Ternary plots of election results
2019

2021
Electoral districts won identified by Liberal (red), PC (blue), NDP (orange) and Independents (grey).
2021 vs 2019

2021 (by winning party)
2021 vs 2019

2021 (by party finishing second)
2021 vs 2019

2021
2021 vs 2019

2021 (by winning party)

==== Turnout, winning shares and swings ====

Summary of riding results by turnout, vote share for winning candidate, and swing (vs 2019)
Riding and winning party			Turnout		Vote share (Note: Share won by winning candidate, with difference noted from share achieved by the same party in 2021.)		Swing (Note: Positive indicates improvement to standing of party winning in 2021; negative points to 2021's second-place party being swung to.)		
Riding and winning party			%	Change (pp)	%	Change (pp)	From	To	Change (pp)
Baie Verte-Green Bay	Lib	Hold	42.11	-17.85	52.06	2.34	Lib	PC	-6.23
Bonavista	PC	Hold	40.48	-18.87	57.32	6.89	Lib	PC	15.45
Burgeo-La Poile	Lib	Hold	33.54	-18.59	87.10	3.64	PC	Lib	4.95
Burin-Grand Bank	Lib	Hold	50.54	-15.16	59.59	7.97	PC	Lib	9.86
Cape St. Francis	PC	Hold	58.12	-13.28	62.51	-9.74	PC	Lib	-10.12
Carbonear-Trinity-Bay de Verde	Lib	Hold	51.55	-15.02	67.53	7.25	PC	Lib	6.79
Cartwright-L'Anse au Clair	Lib	Hold	35.28	-23.52	95.21	27.98	PC	Lib	27.98
Conception Bay East – Bell Island	PC	Hold	50.12	-5.44	56.19	-17.60	PC	Lib	-12.23
Conception Bay South	PC	Hold	55.54	-6.31	57.09	-5.43	PC	Lib	-9.41
Corner Brook	Lib	Hold	38.44	-11.43	66.54	17.69	PC	Lib	8.98
Exploits	PC	Hold	51.50	-12.98	54.80	5.36	PC	Lib	-3.37
Ferryland	PC	Hold	58.69	-10.58	52.33	-8.26	PC	Lib	-8.72
Fogo Island-Cape Freels	Lib	Hold	40.74	-11.35	61.05	6.74	PC	Lib	7.90
Fortune Bay-Cape La Hune	Lib	Hold	50.99	-11.01	68.22	14.84	PC	Lib	16.47
Gander	Lib	Hold	47.85	-13.75	70.93	12.36	PC	Lib	13.93
Grand Falls-Windsor-Buchans	PC	Hold	47.75	-13.00	59.24	6.08	Lib	PC	7.22
Harbour Grace-Port de Grave	Lib	Hold	44.35	-26.84	71.09	18.65	PC	Lib	20.90
Harbour Main	PC	Hold	53.70	-16.15	54.47	-5.62	PC	Lib	-8.30
Humber-Bay of Islands	Ind	Hold	41.00	-21.65	71.60	4.41	Lib	Ind	1.93
Humber-Gros Morne	Lib	Hold	44.83	-23.28	63.96	-5.98	Lib	PC	-4.78
Labrador West	NDP	Hold	43.23	-10.98	50.04	7.81	Lib	NDP	10.58
Lake Melville	Ind	Gain	36.39	-19.23	50.61	32.39	Lib	PC	-10.21
Lewisporte-Twillingate	Lib	Hold	41.06	-19.63	62.44	8.43	PC	Lib	8.43
Mount Pearl North	Lib	Gain	49.64	-8.24	46.69	9.50	PC	Lib	-7.07
Mount Pearl-Southlands	Ind	Hold	54.61	-11.10	59.60	15.85	Lib	Ind	10.09
Mount Scio	Lib	Hold	46.80	-7.71	46.60	4.93	PC	Lib	7.72
Placentia-St. Mary's	Lib	Gain	54.29	-11.39	50.85	6.62	PC	Lib	-7.92
Placentia West-Bellevue	PC	Gain	56.84	-8.86	54.32	15.84	Lib	PC	-10.50
St. Barbe-L'Anse aux Meadows	Lib	Hold	51.30	-13.55	51.16	-10.00	Lib	PC	-10.33
St. George's-Humber	Lib	Hold	43.70	-16.53	58.54	8.37	PC	Lib	6.52
St. John's Centre	NDP	Hold	38.92	-9.68	52.38	5.45	PC	NDP	9.48
St. John's East-Quidi Vidi	Lib	Gain	50.76	-7.27	42.95	9.57	NDP	Lib	-5.52
St. John's West	Lib	Hold	49.14	-8.18	57.82	12.13	PC	Lib	11.16
Stephenville-Port au Port	PC	Hold	43.41	-11.65	59.67	9.36	Lib	PC	10.60
Terra Nova	PC	Hold	53.25	-11.00	53.20	5.02	Lib	PC	2.47
Topsail-Paradise	PC	Hold	55.60	0.85	50.59	-10.39	PC	Lib	-11.76
Torngat Mountains	PC	Hold	22.46	-32.79	88.79	32.21	Lib	PC	36.12
Virginia Waters-Pleasantville	Lib	Hold	56.83	-6.82	59.61	15.36	PC	Lib	14.96
Waterford Valley	Lib	Hold	52.80	0.26	66.79	-1.77	NDP	Lib	10.76
Windsor Lake	Lib	Gain	56.68	-2.96	50.58	12.12	PC	Lib	-10.15

==== Share changes by party ====
Share change analysis by party and riding (2021 vs 2019)
Riding	Liberal		PC		NDP	
Riding	%	Change (pp)	%	Change (pp)	%	Change (pp)
Baie Verte-Green Bay	52.06	2.34	47.94	14.80	N/A	
Bonavista	25.56	-24.00	57.32	6.89	1.90	1.90
Burgeo-La Poile	87.10	3.64	10.28	-6.26	2.62	2.62
Burin-Grand Bank	59.59	7.97	36.63	-11.75	3.78	3.78
Cape St. Francis	28.25	10.50	62.51	-9.74	8.07	1.77
Carbonear-Trinity-Bay de Verde	67.53	7.25	27.69	-6.32	4.53	-0.43
Cartwright-L'Anse au Clair	95.21	27.98	4.79	-27.98	N/A	
Conception Bay East – Bell Island	33.08	6.87	56.19	-17.60	10.73	10.73
Conception Bay South	36.18	13.40	57.09	-5.43	4.19	4.19
Corner Brook	66.54	17.69	33.46	-0.27	–	-14.70
Exploits	45.20	12.10	54.80	5.36	N/A	
Ferryland	44.13	9.18	52.33	-8.26	3.54	3.54
Fogo Island-Cape Freels	61.05	6.74	36.64	-9.05	2.31	2.31
Fortune Bay-Cape La Hune	68.22	14.84	28.52	-18.09	3.25	3.25
Gander	70.93	12.36	25.94	-15.49	3.13	3.13
Grand Falls-Windsor-Buchans	38.47	-8.37	59.24	6.08	2.30	2.30
Harbour Grace-Port de Grave	71.09	18.65	24.42	-23.14	4.49	4.49
Harbour Main	41.62	10.98	54.47	-5.62	3.91	3.91
Humber-Bay of Islands	17.76	0.56	10.64	0.03	–	-4.99
Humber-Gros Morne	63.96	-5.98	33.63	3.57	2.41	2.41
Labrador West	28.72	-13.35	21.24	5.54	50.04	7.81
Lake Melville	13.35	-32.49	23.87	-12.07	12.17	12.17
Lewisporte-Twillingate	62.44	8.43	37.56	-8.43	N/A	
Mount Pearl North	46.69	9.50	44.60	-4.64	6.48	0.42
Mount Pearl-Southlands	23.98	-4.32	13.79	-10.85	2.63	-0.69
Mount Scio	46.60	4.93	26.70	-10.52	24.89	12.33
Placentia-St. Mary's	50.85	3.46	46.54	8.06	N/A	
Placentia West-Bellevue	42.21	-2.02	54.32	-1.45	3.46	3.46
St. Barbe-L'Anse aux Meadows	51.16	-10.00	46.51	10.67	0.82	0.82
St. George's-Humber	58.54	8.37	35.66	-4.67	4.62	4.62
St. John's Centre	33.60	8.06	14.02	-13.51	52.38	5.45
St. John's East-Quidi Vidi	42.95	9.57	15.03	-8.11	42.02	-1.46
St. John's West	57.82	12.13	32.03	-10.19	10.14	-1.94
Stephenville-Port au Port	37.85	-11.83	59.67	9.36	2.48	2.48
Terra Nova	43.56	0.09	53.20	5.02	3.24	3.24
Topsail-Paradise	42.08	13.13	50.59	-10.39	7.33	7.33
Torngat Mountains	3.38	-40.03	88.79	32.21	7.82	7.82
Virginia Waters-Pleasantville	59.61	15.36	20.96	-14.57	19.43	-0.79
Waterford Valley	66.79	-1.77	25.07	25.07	8.14	-23.29
Windsor Lake	50.58	12.12	40.53	-8.18	8.88	-3.94

=== Ridings changing hands ===
Four ridings changed their allegiance from 2019:

Liberal to Independent

- Lake Melville

PC to Liberal

- Mount Pearl North
- Windsor Lake

NDP to Liberal

- St. John's East-Quidi Vidi

Resulting composition of the 50th General Assembly of Newfoundland and Labrador
Source		Party				
Source		Lib	PC	NDP	Ind	Total
Seats retained	Incumbents returned	17	12	2	2	33
Seats retained	Open seats held	2	1			3
Seats changing hands	Incumbents defeated	3				3
Seats changing hands	Change in affiliation				1	1
Total		22	13	2	3	40

=== Incumbent MHAs who were defeated ===
Party	Name	Constituency	Year elected	Seat held by party since	Defeated by	Party
NDP	Alison Coffin	St. John's East-Quidi Vidi	2019	2015 (1990)	John Abbott	Liberal
PC	Ches Crosbie	Windsor Lake	2018	2018	John Hogan	Liberal
PC	Jim Lester	Mount Pearl North	2017	2007	Lucy Stoyles	Liberal

== Timeline ==
Changes in seats held (2019–2021)

Seat	Before				Change		
Seat	Date	Member	Party	Reason	Date	Member	Party
Humber-Gros Morne	September 7, 2020	Dwight Ball	█ Liberal	Resignation	October 6, 2020	Andrew Furey	█ Liberal
Lake Melville	November 10, 2020	Perry Trimper	█ Liberal	Resigned from caucus (Note: over his comments regarding Innu/Inuit in his district)			█ Independent

2019

- May 16, 2019 – The Liberal Party of Newfoundland and Labrador wins 20 of the 40 seats in the House of Assembly during the general election, re-electing Premier Dwight Ball but forcing the Liberals to form a minority government. This is the first time the province elected a minority government since 1971.
- May 30, 2019 – Premier Ball's cabinet is sworn in; all ministers maintain their previous portfolios with the exception of MHA Warr entering cabinet.
- September 13, 2019 – Minister Trimper resigns from cabinet after comments critical of the Innu Nation were left on the voicemail of an Innu Nation staffer and publicly revealed.
- September 13, 2019 – MHA Bragg is appointed Minister of Municipal Affairs and Environment replacing Trimper.
- December 5, 2019 – The House of Assembly votes to reprimand Minister Chris Mitchelmore for his hiring of Carla Foote at The Rooms despite her lack of qualifications and her political connections to the Liberals. The House of Assembly ordered that Mitchelmore apologize to the Board of Directors of The Rooms, to the House of Assembly, and also be suspended two-week without pay.

2020

- February 17, 2020 – Dwight Ball announces that he will be resigning as Premier of Newfoundland and Labrador following a Liberal leadership election. Provincial legislation requires a general election to be held no more than one year following a Premier's resignation.
- April 4, 2020 – Service NL Minister Sherry Gambin-Walsh was removed from cabinet as the RCMP launched a criminal investigation into allegations that she leaked cabinet documents.
- July 16, 2020 – The Progressive Conservatives begin opening up nominations in anticipation of an upcoming provincial election.
- July 21, 2020 – The NL Alliance open nominations in all forty districts.
- August 3, 2020 – Andrew Furey is elected leader of the Liberal Party.
- August 19, 2020 – Furey is formally sworn in as Premier, along with a new provincial cabinet. MHAs Bennett, Loveless, and Stoodley enter cabinet.
- September 7, 2020 – Dwight Ball resigns as MHA for Humber-Gros Morne.
- September 9, 2020 – The RCMP disclose that Sherry Gambin-Walsh broke cabinet confidentiality by leaking information to Paul Didham, a senior police officer with the Royal Newfoundland Constabulary. The RCMP did not lay criminal charges against Gambin-Walsh because no one benefited from the information; however Premier Furey did not reappoint her to cabinet.
- September 14, 2020 – The Liberals open nominations for a general election.
- September 25, 2020 – The New Democratic Party opens nominations for a general election.
- October 2, 2020 – At their annual convention, the Progressive Conservatives vote against conducting a review of Ches Crosbie's leadership.
- October 6, 2020 – Liberal candidate, Premier Andrew Furey, is elected in the Humber-Gros Morne by-election.

2021

- January 15, 2021 – Premier Furey asks Lieutenant Governor Judy Foote to dissolve the House of Assembly for a general provincial election, scheduled for February 13, 2021.
- January 17, 2021 – The Progressive Conservatives become the first of the four registered parties to nominate a slate of 40 candidates.
- January 21, 2021 – The Liberals become the second of the four registered parties to nominate a slate of 40 candidates.
- January 22, 2021 – NL Alliance leader Graydon Pelley suspends his campaign due to an emergency surgery that left him in an extensive recovery period.
- January 23, 2021 – Deadline for candidates to be nominated.
- February 2, 2021 – Initial deadline for mail-in ballots to be received.
- February 6, 2021 – Advance voting took place.
- February 11, 2021 – Following a surge in cases of COVID-19 in St. John's and the surrounding area, Chief Electoral Officer Bruce Chaulk announced that voting in 18 of the province's 40 electoral districts, all in the Avalon Peninsula, would be delayed indefinitely.
- February 12, 2021 – In-person voting is entirely canceled province-wide after it was discovered that the new COVID-19 cases were the Variant of Concern 202012/01.
- February 13, 2021 – Initial date that the election was to be held.
- March 1, 2021 – Original day that mail-in ballots were to be received.
- March 5, 2021 – Second deadline that mail-in ballots were to be received.
- March 25, 2021 – Deadline that mail-in ballots are to be received.
- March 27, 2021 – Preliminary results are to be announced by Elections NL.
- March 30, 2021 – Results will officially be tallied, and the victors will be declared elected.

== Campaign ==
=== Party platforms ===
At the start of the campaign, incumbent Liberal Premier Andrew Furey framed the election around the economy, by focusing on the provincial debt, the oil industry, and government spending. There are $55M worth of expenses proposed.

With a similar focus on the economy, PC leader Ches Crosbie emphasized the importance of creating jobs through infrastructure projects, eliminating regulations, and cutting taxes. Meanwhile, NDP leader Alison Coffin centred her priorities on health care and affordable living.

=== Initial election call and reaction ===
Prior to the election being called, the provincial government made a series of announcements involving new spending programs and reached agreements with several unions. The timing of these announcements received disapproval from the PCs. The Liberals were also criticized by the PCs and NDP for calling an election during the winter and the COVID-19 pandemic. Both of the opposition parties suggested that the Liberals should have waited until recommendations were made by the premier's economic recovery team, which was scheduled to release an interim report at the end of February and a final report at the end of April. Despite their criticism, the PCs and NDP indicated that they were prepared for the election.

=== Impact of the COVID-19 pandemic ===
Due to the COVID-19 pandemic, Elections NL issued lengthy guidelines for candidates, with parties placing a larger emphasis on social media rather than door-to-door canvassing, large rallies or visits to seniors' homes. In order to avoid crowds on election day, Elections NL focused efforts on voting by mail and scheduled the election on a Saturday for the first time in the province's history. Additionally, the Liberals did not allow members of the media on the party's campaign bus, citing "COVID-19 protocols".

Early voting has increased.

==== Surge in COVID-19 cases during campaign ====
On February 8, the province confirmed its first case of community spread of COVID-19 since April 2020. Since the deadlines for voting early or by mail had already passed, it raised concerns about if the election should still go ahead as planned. Chief Electoral Officer Bruce Chaulk stated that no provisions existed that allowed people in isolation to vote, and that the election would proceed as intended.

On February 9, PC candidate Damian Follett suspended in-person campaigning after his son tested positive for COVID-19. On February 12, Follett announced that he had tested positive himself. On the same day, PC candidate Rhonda Simms also suspended in-person campaigning after an individual who had visited her headquarters later tested presumptive positive.

On February 10, Elections NL announced that there would be a 'drive-thru' voting option for the increasing number of people who were in self-isolation. However, this option was later scrapped, as it went against a medical advisory which stated that those self-isolating should not leave their property. On February 11, Chief Electoral Officer Bruce Chaulk issued a letter requesting that party leaders meet with Lieutenant Governor Judy Foote to discuss delaying the election. Chaulk announced later that day that in-person voting would be delayed to a later date on the Avalon Peninsula but would go ahead as planned elsewhere. The following day, Chaulk announced that no in-person voting would take place soon after it was confirmed that the recent COVID-19 cases were the Variant of Concern 202012/01.

=== Withdrawn candidates ===
In January 2021, the leader of the Newfoundland and Labrador Alliance Graydon Pelley withdrew his candidacy in Humber-Gros Morne following a medical emergency.

=== Issues ===
There were claims that sexism and misogyny has affected women candidates on the campaign trail.

== Target seats ==
CBC News identified 5 "must-watch districts";

- Lake Melville
- Labrador West
- Placentia-St. Mary's
- St. Barbe-L'Anse aux Meadows
- Mount Scio

=== Opposition ===
Seat	MHA	Party	Margin in 2019	Result
Labrador West	Jordan Brown	New Democrat	0.1%	New Democrat hold
Stephenville-Port au Port	Tony Wakeham	Progressive Conservative	0.6%	Progressive Conservative hold
Bonavista	Craig Pardy	Progressive Conservative	0.8%	Progressive Conservative hold
Terra Nova	Lloyd Parrott	Progressive Conservative	4.7%	Progressive Conservative hold
Grand Falls-Windsor-Buchans	Chris Tibbs	Progressive Conservative	6.4%	Progressive Conservative hold
St. John's East-Quidi Vidi	Alison Coffin	New Democrat	10.1%	Liberal gain
Windsor Lake	Ches Crosbie	Progressive Conservative	10.2%	Liberal gain
Placentia West-Bellevue	Jeff Dwyer	Progressive Conservative	11.6%	Progressive Conservative hold
Mount Pearl North	Jim Lester	Progressive Conservative	12.0%	Liberal gain
Mount Pearl-Southlands	Paul Lane	Independent	15.4%	Independent hold
St. John's Centre	Jim Dinn	New Democrat	21.4%	New Democrat hold
Harbour Main	Helen Conway-Ottenheimer	Progressive Conservative	29.5%	Progressive Conservative hold
Topsail-Paradise	Paul Dinn	Progressive Conservative	32.1%	Progressive Conservative hold
Conception Bay South	Barry Petten	Progressive Conservative	39.7%	Progressive Conservative hold
Conception Bay East – Bell Island	David Brazil	Progressive Conservative	47.6%	Progressive Conservative hold
Humber-Bay of Islands	Eddie Joyce	Independent	50.0%	Independent hold
Cape St. Francis	Kevin Parsons	Progressive Conservative	54.5%	Progressive Conservative hold

=== Liberal ===
Seat	MHA	Party	Margin in 2019	Result
Burin-Grand Bank	Carol Anne Haley	Liberal	1.2%	
St. John's West	Siobhan Coady	Liberal	3.5%	
Mount Scio	Sarah Stoodley	Liberal	4.5%	
Harbour Grace-Port de Grave	Pam Parsons	Liberal	4.8%	
Fortune Bay-Cape La Hune	Elvis Loveless	Liberal	6.8%	
Lewisporte-Twillingate	Derek Bennett	Liberal	8.0%	
Fogo Island-Cape Freels	Derrick Bragg	Liberal	8.6%	
Virginia Waters-Pleasantville	Bernard Davis	Liberal	8.7%	
Placentia-St. Mary's	Sherry Gambin-Walsh	Liberal	8.9%	
Lake Melville	Perry Trimper	Liberal	9.9%	
St. George's-Humber	Scott Reid	Liberal	9.9%	
Corner Brook	Gerry Byrne	Liberal	15.1%	
Gander	John Haggie	Liberal	17.2%	
Mount Pearl-Southlands	Paul Lane	Independent	19.1%	
St. John's Centre	Jim Dinn	New Democrat	19.4%	
St. John's East-Quidi Vidi	Alison Coffin	New Democrat	20.4%	
Carbonear-Trinity-Bay de Verde	Steve Crocker	Liberal	26.3%	
Humber-Gros Morne	Dwight Ball	Liberal	39.8%	
Humber-Bay of Islands	Eddie Joyce	Independent	56.6%	
Burgeo-La Poile	Andrew Parsons	Liberal	67.0%	

=== Opposition ===
Seat	MHA	Party	Margin in 2019	Result
Virginia Waters-Pleasantville	Bernard Davis	Liberal	24.0%	Liberal hold
Corner Brook	Gerry Byrne	Liberal	34.1%	Liberal hold
Waterford Valley	Tom Osborne	Liberal	37.2%	Liberal hold

== Candidates by district ==
- Names in **boldface type** represent party leaders.
- † represents that the incumbent is not running again.
- § represents that the incumbent was defeated for nomination.
- ₰ represents that the incumbent ran in another district and lost the nomination
- ‡ represents that the incumbent is running in a different district.

=== St. John's ===
Electoral district	Candidates				Incumbent
Electoral district	Liberal	PC	NDP	Other	Incumbent
Mount Scio; 46.80% turnout	Sarah Stoodley; 2,011; 46.60%	Damian Follett; 1,152; 26.70%	Sheilagh O'Leary; 1,074; 24.89%	Andrea Newbury (NL Alliance); 60; 1.39%	Sarah Stoodley
Mount Scio; 46.80% turnout	Sarah Stoodley; 2,011; 46.60%	Damian Follett; 1,152; 26.70%	Sheilagh O'Leary; 1,074; 24.89%	Larry Borne (Independent); 18; 0.42%	Sarah Stoodley
St. John's Centre; 38.92% turnout	Gemma Hickey; 1,277; 33.60%	Robyn LeGrow; 533; 14.02%	Jim Dinn; 1,991; 52.38%		Jim Dinn
St. John's East-Quidi Vidi; 50.76% turnout	John Abbott; 2,447; 42.95%	Vaughn Hammond; 856; 15.03%	**Alison Coffin**; 2,394; 42.02%		**Alison Coffin**
St. John's West; 49.14% turnout	Siobhan Coady; 2,679; 57.82%	Kristina Ennis; 1,484; 32.03%	Brenda Walsh; 470; 10.14%		Siobhan Coady
Virginia Waters-Pleasantville; 56.83% turnout	Bernard Davis; 3,481; 59.61%	Victor Lawlor; 1,224; 20.96%	Jenn Deon; 1,135; 19.43%		Bernard Davis
Waterford Valley; 52.78% turnout	Tom Osborne; 3,592; 66.79%	Michael Holden; 1,348; 25.07%	Peter Young; 438; 8.14%		Tom Osborne
Windsor Lake; 56.68% turnout	John Hogan; 2,688; 50.58%	**Ches Crosbie**; 2,154; 40.53%	Tomás Shea; 472; 8.88%		**Ches Crosbie**

=== St. John's suburbs ===
Electoral district	Candidates					Incumbent
Electoral district	Liberal	PC	NDP	Alliance	Other	Incumbent
Cape St. Francis; 58.12% turnout	Peter Whittle; 1,571; 28.25%	Joedy Wall; 3,476; 62.51%	Phyllis Fleming; 449; 8.07%	Ryan Lane; 65; 1.17%		Kevin Parsons†
Conception Bay East – Bell Island; 50.12% turnout	Lynn Hammond; 1,893; 33.08%	David Brazil; 3,215; 56.18%	Gavin Will; 614; 10.73%			David Brazil
Conception Bay South; 55.54% turnout	Shelley Moores; 1,941; 36.18%	Barry Petten; 3,063; 57.09%	Andrew Lovell; 225; 4.19%	Warrick Butler; 136; 2.53%		Barry Petten
Mount Pearl North; 49.64% turnout	Lucy Stoyles; 2,428; 46.69%	Jim Lester; 2,319; 44.60%	Jennifer McCreath; 337; 6.48%	William Neville; 116; 2.23%		Jim Lester
Mount Pearl-Southlands; 54.61% turnout	Karla Hayward; 1,386; 23.98%	Cindy Grant; 797; 13.79%	Cara Winsor-Hehir; 152; 2.63%		Paul Lane (Independent); 3,445; 59.60%	Paul Lane
Topsail-Paradise; 55.60% turnout	Ken Carter; 2,525; 42.08%	Paul Dinn; 3,036; 50.59%	Kathleen Burt; 440; 7.33%			Paul Dinn

=== Avalon Peninsula ===
Electoral district	Candidates				Incumbent
Electoral district	Liberal	PC	NDP	Other	Incumbent
Carbonear-Trinity-Bay de Verde; 51.55% turnout	Steve Crocker; 3,892; 67.53%	Frank Butt; 1,596; 27.69%	Matthew Smith; 261; 4.53%	Edward Thomas Cole (Independent); 14; 0.24%	Steve Crocker
Ferryland; 58.69% turnout	Cheryl O’Brien; 2,696; 44.13%	Loyola O'Driscoll; 3,197; 52.33%	Paul Murphy; 216; 3.54%		Loyola O'Driscoll
Harbour Grace-Port de Grave; 44.35% turnout	Pam Parsons; 3,404; 71.09%	Roy Sparkes; 1,169; 24.42%	Dion Hynes; 215; 4.79%		Pam Parsons
Harbour Main; 53.70% turnout	George Murphy; 2,430; 41.62%	Helen Conway-Ottenheimer; 3,180; 54.47%	Anthony Chadwick; 228; 3.91%		Helen Conway-Ottenheimer
Placentia-St. Mary's; 54.29% turnout	Sherry Gambin-Walsh; 2,552; 50.85%	Calvin Manning; 2,336; 46.54%		Clem Whittle (NL Alliance); 131; 2.61%	Sherry Gambin-Walsh

=== Eastern Newfoundland ===
Electoral district	Candidates				Incumbent
Electoral district	Liberal	PC	NDP	Other	Incumbent
Bonavista; 40.48% turnout	Christine Gill; 944; 25.56%	Craig Pardy; 2,117; 57.32%	Timothy Whey; 70; 1.90%	Neil King (Independent); 562; 15.22%	Craig Pardy
Burin-Grand Bank; 50.54% turnout	Paul Pike; 2,666; 59.59%	Fred Dodge; 1,639; 36.63%	Alvin Banfield; 169; 4.47%		Carol Anne Haley†
Placentia West-Bellevue; 56.84% turnout	Sam Synard; 2,304; 42.21%	Jeff Dwyer; 2,965; 54.32%	Carolyn Davis; 189; 3.46%		Jeff Dwyer
Terra Nova; 53.25% turnout	Steve Denty; 2,323; 43.56%	Lloyd Parrott; 2,837; 53.20%	Anne Marie Anonsen; 173; 3.24%		Lloyd Parrott

=== Central Newfoundland ===
Electoral district	Candidates			Incumbent
Electoral district	Liberal	PC	NDP	Incumbent
Baie Verte-Green Bay; 42.11% turnout	Brian Warr; 2,148; 52.06%	Lin Paddock; 1,987; 47.94%		Brian Warr
Exploits; 51.50% turnout	Rodney Mercer; 2,178; 45.20%	Pleaman Forsey; 2,641; 54.80%		Pleaman Forsey
Fogo Island-Cape Freels; 40.74% turnout	Derrick Bragg; 2,511; 61.05%	Sue Collins; 1,507; 36.64%	Jim Gill; 95; 2.31%	Derrick Bragg
Fortune Bay-Cape La Hune; 50.99% turnout	Elvis Loveless; 1,868; 68.22%	Charlene Walsh; 781; 28.52%	Noel Joe; 89; 3.25%	Elvis Loveless
Gander; 47.85% turnout	John Haggie; 3,358; 70.93%	Jamie Harnum; 1,228; 25.94%	Dawn Lahey; 148; 3.13%	John Haggie
Grand Falls-Windsor-Buchans; 47.75% turnout	Deborah Ball; 1,776; 38.47%	Chris Tibbs; 2,735; 59.24%	Holly Pike; 106; 2.30%	Chris Tibbs
Lewisporte-Twillingate; 41.06% turnout	Derek Bennett; 2,593; 62.44%	Rhonda Simms; 1,560; 37.56%		Derek Bennett

=== Western Newfoundland ===
Electoral district	Candidates				Incumbent
Electoral district	Liberal	PC	NDP	Other	Incumbent
Burgeo-La Poile; 33.54% turnout	Andrew Parsons; 1,992; 87.10%	Ethan Wheeler-Park; 235; 10.28%	Judy Vanta; 60; 2.62%		Andrew Parsons
Corner Brook; 38.44% turnout	Gerry Byrne; 2,593; 66.54%	Tom Stewart; 1,304; 33.46%	(Note: Graham Downey-Sutton was originally the New Democratic candidate, but later withdrew from the race due to difficulties with Coffin's non-committal stance as to whether the Corner Brook Acute Care Hospital should receive a PET scanner.)		Gerry Byrne
Humber-Gros Morne; 44.83% turnout	**Andrew Furey**; 2,838; 63.96%	Jim Goudie; 1,492; 33.63%	Sheina Lerman; 107; 2.41%	(Note: Graydon Pelley was originally the NL Alliance candidate, but later withdrew following an emergency surgery that left him in an extended recovery period.)	**Andrew Furey**
Humber-Bay of Islands; 41.00% turnout	Stelman Flynn; 741; 17.76%	Robert Marche; 444; 10.64%		Eddie Joyce (Independent); 2,988; 71.60%	Eddie Joyce
St. Barbe-L'Anse aux Meadows; 51.30% turnout	Krista Howell; 2,365; 51.17%	Sheila Fitzgerald; 2,159; 46.47%	John McClusky; 38; 0.82%	Ford Mitchelmore (Independent); 70; 1.51%	Chris Mitchelmore†
St. George's-Humber; 43.70% turnout	Scott Reid; 2,420; 58.54%	Gary Bishop; 1,474; 35.66%	Melissa Samms; 191; 4.62%	Shane Snook (NL Alliance); 49; 1.19%	Scott Reid
Stephenville-Port au Port; 43.41% turnout	Kevin Aylward; 1,574; 37.85%	Tony Wakeham; 2,481; 59.67%	Jamie Ruby; 103; 2.48%		Tony Wakeham

=== Labrador ===
Electoral district	Candidates				Incumbent
Electoral district	Liberal	PC	NDP	Other	Incumbent
Cartwright-L'Anse au Clair; 35.28% turnout	Lisa Dempster; 973; 95.21%	Joshua Nolan; 49; 4.79%			Lisa Dempster
Labrador West; 43.23% turnout	Wayne Button; 780; 28.72%	Nick McGrath; 577; 21.24%	Jordan Brown; 1,359; 50.04%		Jordan Brown
Lake Melville; 36.39% turnout	Michelle Baikie; 306; 13.35%	Shannon Tobin; 547; 23.87%	Amy Norman; 279; 12.17%	Perry Trimper (Independent) (Note: Perry Trimper was originally the Liberal candidate, but later withdrew following his comments about homeless Innu/Inuit in his district. He later ran as an independent.); 1,143; 49.83%	Perry Trimper
Lake Melville; 36.39% turnout	Michelle Baikie; 306; 13.35%	Shannon Tobin; 547; 23.87%	Amy Norman; 279; 12.17%	Andrew Abbass (Independent); 17; 0.74%	Perry Trimper
Torngat Mountains; 22.46% turnout	Devon Ryan; 16; 3.38%	Lela Evans; 420; 88.79%	Patricia Johnson-Castle; 37; 7.82%		Lela Evans

== Opinion polls ==
Voting Intentions in Newfoundland and Labrador since the 2019 election

Polling firm	Final day of polling	Link	Liberal	PC	NDP	NLA
Election 2021	March 25, 2021	–	48.2	38.8	8.0	0.3
Forum Research	March 24, 2021		47.6	33.7	13.8	–
Mainstreet Research	February 23, 2021		53	32	9	2
Mainstreet Research	February 10, 2021		54	26	17	2
Mainstreet Research	January 29, 2021		62	26	9	1
MQO Research	December 23, 2020		65	22	11	0
Narrative Research	December 3, 2020		58	26	13	–
Angus Reid	November 30, 2020		50	39	8	–
MQO Research	September 2, 2020		53	33	11	1
Narrative Research	August 18, 2020		61	21	15	–
Angus Reid	June 8, 2020		48	35	12	–
Narrative Research	May 26, 2020		60	26	13	–
Narrative Research	February 23, 2020		37	35	26	–
Narrative Research	November 22, 2019		42	33	24	–
Narrative Research	August 25, 2019		42	32	24	–
MQO Research	July 31, 2019		50	34	13	1
Election 2019	May 16, 2019	–	43.9	42.6	6.3	2.4
