= Carol Haley =

Carol Haley may refer to:

- Carol Louise Haley (born 1951), member of the Legislative Assembly of Alberta
- Carol Anne Haley (born 1972), member of the Newfoundland and Labrador House of Assembly
