= 2020 Humber-Gros Morne provincial by-election =

By-election in Newfoundland and Labrador

2020 Humber - Gros Morne provincial by-election
- October 22, 2020

Riding of Humber-Gros Morne
- Turnout: 55.10% (▼13.01)
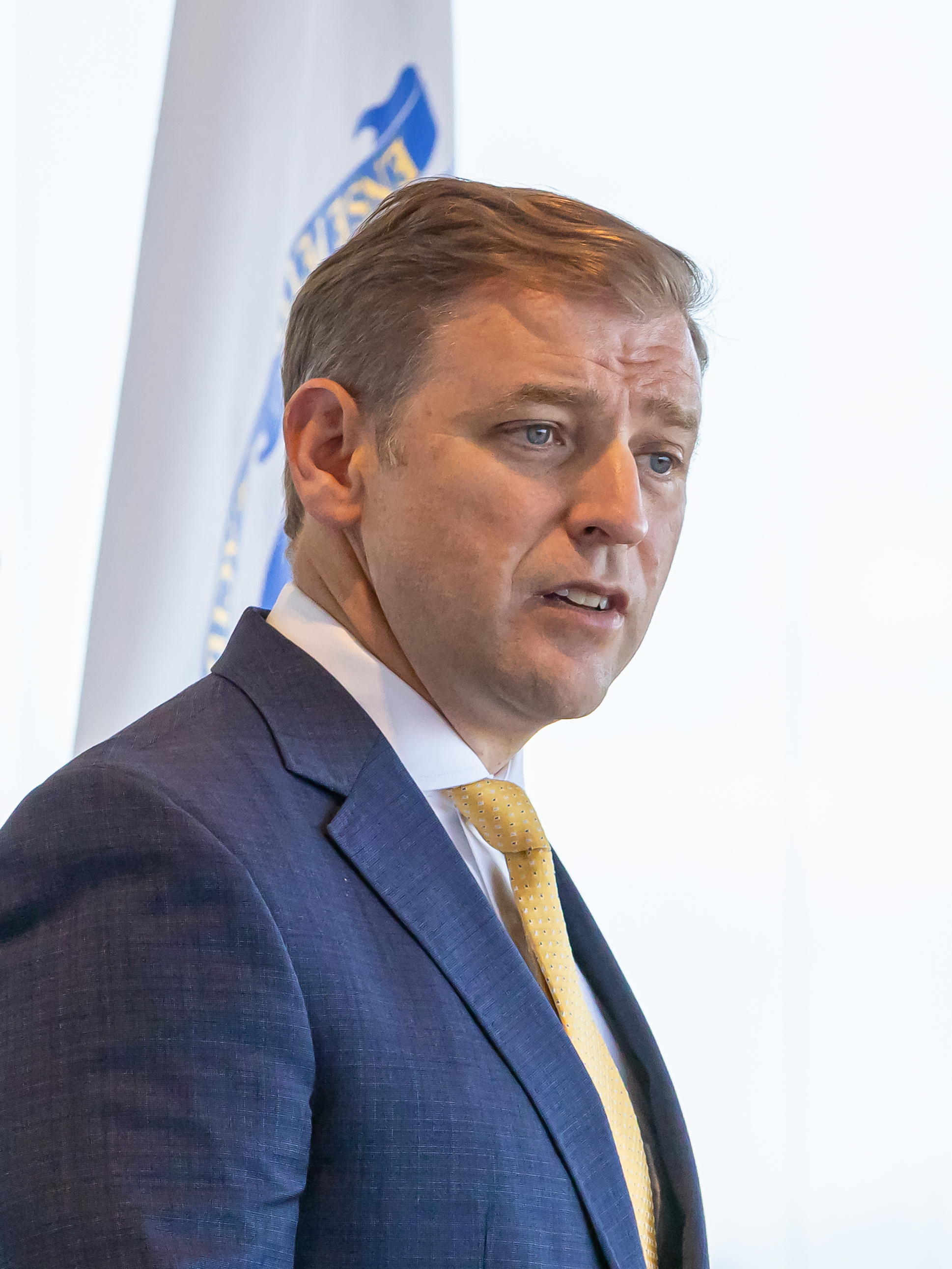
	First party	Second party	Third party
		PC	NLA
Candidate	Andrew Furey	Mike Goosney	Graydon Pelley
Party	Liberal	Progressive Conservative	NL Alliance
Last election	69.49%	30.06%	–
Popular vote	3,401	1,332	464
Percentage	63.95%	25.05%	8.73%
Swing	▼5.99	▼5.01	–
MHA before election
Dwight Ball
Liberal
Elected MHA
Andrew Furey
Liberal

The 2020 Humber-Gros Morne provincial by-election was held on October 6, 2020. The by-election was triggered upon the resignation of Liberal MHA and former Premier Dwight Ball.

The seat was won by Liberal candidate and former orthopedic surgeon, Andrew Furey.

== Candidates ==
There were four candidates filed for the by-election

- Andrew Furey (Liberal) - Incumbent Premier and humanitarian.
- Mike Goosney (PC) - Former deputy mayor of Deer Lake.
- Graydon Pelley (NL Alliance) - Leader of the NL Alliance.
- Graham Downey-Sutton (NDP) - Developmental support worker.

== Results ==
Humber-Gros Morne - By-election, 6 October 2020 Resignation of Dwight Ball
Party	Candidate	Votes	%	±%
Liberal	Andrew Furey	3,401	63.95	-5.99
Progressive Conservative	Mike Goosney	1,332	25.05	-5.01
NL Alliance	Graydon Pelley	464	8.73	+8.73
New Democratic	Graham Downey-Sutton	121	2.28	+2.28
Total valid votes		5,318	55.11	-13.00
Eligible voters		9,650		
Liberal hold		Swing		-0.49

== Results of previous election ==
2019 Newfoundland and Labrador general election
Party	Candidate	Votes	%	±%
Liberal	Dwight Ball	4,247	69.94	-6.04
Progressive Conservative	Greg Osmond	1,825	30.06	+13.85
Total valid votes		6,072	98.96	
Total rejected ballots		64	1.04	+0.76
Turnout		6,136	68.11	+3.47
Eligible voters		9,009		
Liberal hold		Swing		-9.95

== See also ==
- List of Newfoundland and Labrador by-elections
