= Mike Goosney =

Canadian politician

The Honourable Mike Goosney ECNL MHA

Member of the Newfoundland and Labrador House of Assembly for Humber-Gros Morne
- Incumbent
- Assumed office October 14, 2025
- Preceded by: Andrew Furey

Minister of Government Services
- In office October 29, 2025 – August 20, 2026
- Preceded by: Sarah Stoodley
- Succeeded by: Lloyd Parrott

Minister of Labour
- In office October 29, 2025 – August 20, 2026
- Preceded by: Pam Parsons
- Succeeded by: Lloyd Parrott

Mayor of Deer Lake
- In office September 28, 2021 – September 15, 2025
- Preceded by: Dean Ball
- Succeeded by: Dean Ball

Minister of Tourism, Culture, and Arts, and Minister of Sports, Recreation, and Parks
- Incumbent
- Assumed office August 20, 2026
- Preceded by: Andrea Barbour

Personal details
- Party: Progressive Conservative
- Other political affiliations: New Democratic (formerly)

Mike Goosney is a Canadian politician from Newfoundland and Labrador. He was elected to the Newfoundland and Labrador House of Assembly as the member for Humber-Gros Morne in the 2025 general election.

== Political career ==
Goosney was a steel worker before entering politics. He served on the town councils in Labrador City and Deer Lake, and he served as the mayor of Deer Lake for four years.

Goosney was previously a member of the Newfoundland and Labrador New Democratic Party and competed in the party's 2015 leadership election, coming in second behind then-leader Earle McCurdy. He also ran as the party's candidate for Humber-Gros Morne in that year's general election. After joining the Progressive Conservative Party (PCs), Goosney competed in the 2020 by-election for the same riding, coming in second place behind Premier Andrew Furey. Goosney's third candidacy for the House of Assembly in 2025 was successful.

On October 29, 2025 Goosney was appointed Minister of Government Services, Minister of Labour, Minister Responsible for Office of the Chief Information Officer, and Minister Responsible for WorkplaceNL.

On August 20, 2026, following a cabinet shuffle in the Wakeham ministry, Goosney was appointed to the new roles of Minister of Tourism, Culture and Arts, Minister of Sport, Recreation and Parks, Minister Responsible for PictureNL, Minister Responsible for the Newfoundland and Labrador Arts Council, and Minister Responsible for the Pippy Park Commission.

On September 17, 2026, Goosney voted to approve the Churchill Falls Definitive Cooperation and Implementation Agreement (DCIA) in the House of Assembly along with the PC caucus.

== Election results ==
2025 Newfoundland and Labrador general election: Humber-Gros Morne
Party	Candidate	Votes	%	±%
Progressive Conservative	Mike Goosney	3,238	58.05	+24.42
Liberal	Helen Reid	2,093	37.52	-26.44
New Democratic	Rebecca Brushett	247	4.43	+2.02
Total valid votes		5,578		
Total rejected ballots				
Turnout				
Eligible voters				
Progressive Conservative gain from Liberal		Swing		+25.43

Humber-Gros Morne - By-election, 6 October 2020 Resignation of Dwight Ball
Party	Candidate	Votes	%	±%
Liberal	Andrew Furey	3,401	63.95	-5.99
Progressive Conservative	Mike Goosney	1,332	25.05	-5.01
NL Alliance	Graydon Pelley	464	8.73	+8.73
New Democratic	Graham Downey-Sutton	121	2.28	+2.28
Total valid votes		5,318	55.11	-13.00
Eligible voters		9,650		
Liberal hold		Swing		-0.49

2015 Newfoundland and Labrador general election
Party	Candidate	Votes	%
Liberal	Dwight Ball	4,610	75.98
Progressive Conservative	Graydon Pelley	983	16.20
New Democratic	Mike Goosney	474	7.81
Total valid votes		6,067	99.72
Total rejected ballots		17	0.28
Turnout		6,084	64.64
Eligible voters		9,412	

=== 2021 Deer Lake Mayoral election ===
Mayoral Candidate	Vote	%
Mike Goosney	1,207	51.21
Dean Ball (X)	1,150	48.79
