= Stephenville-Port au Port =

Provincial electoral district in Newfoundland and Labrador, Canada

Newfoundland and Labrador electoral district

Provincial electoral district
- Legislature: Newfoundland and Labrador House of Assembly
MHA
Tony Wakeham
Progressive Conservative
- District created: 2015
- First contested: 2015
- Last contested: 2025

Demographics
- Population (2011): 13,781
- Electors (2015): 9,860
- Area (km²): 925
- Census division: Division No. 4
- Census subdivision(s): Cape St. George, Division No. 4, Subd. D, Division No. 4, Subd. E, Kippens, Lourdes, Port au Port East, Port au Port West-Aguathuna-Felix Cove, Stephenville

Stephenville-Port au Port is a provincial electoral district in Newfoundland and Labrador, Canada, which is represented by one member in the Newfoundland and Labrador House of Assembly. It was contested for the first time in the 2015 provincial election.

The district encompasses the town of Stephenville and the Port au Port Peninsula.

The district is represented by PC leader and Premier Tony Wakeham.

== Members of the House of Assembly ==
The district has elected the following members of the House of Assembly:

Assembly	Years	Member	Party
48th	2015–2019	John Finn	Liberal
49th	2019–2021	Tony Wakeham	Progressive Conservative
50th	2021–2025	Tony Wakeham	Progressive Conservative
51st	2025–present	Tony Wakeham	Progressive Conservative

== Election results ==
Graph of election results (minor parties that never got 2% of the vote or did not run consistently are omitted) View source data.

2025 Newfoundland and Labrador general election
Party	Candidate	Votes	%	±%
Progressive Conservative	Tony Wakeham	3,820	76.29	+16.63
Liberal	Jeff Young	1,044	20.85	-17.00
New Democratic	Susan Jarvis	143	2.86	+0.38
Total valid votes		5,007		
Total rejected ballots				
Turnout				
Eligible voters				
Progressive Conservative hold		Swing		+16.81

2021 Newfoundland and Labrador general election
Party	Candidate	Votes	%	±%
Progressive Conservative	Tony Wakeham	2,481	59.67	+9.36
Liberal	Kevin Aylward	1,574	37.85	-11.83
New Democratic	Jamie Ruby	103	2.48	
Total valid votes		4,158	99.59	
Total rejected ballots		17	0.41	
Turnout		4,175	43.41	
Eligible voters		9,618		
Progressive Conservative hold		Swing		+10.60
Source(s) "Officially Nominated Candidates General Election 2021" (PDF). Elections Newfoundland and Labrador. "NL Election 2021 (Unofficial Results)".

2019 Newfoundland and Labrador general election
Party	Candidate	Votes	%	±%
Progressive Conservative	Tony Wakeham	2,512	50.31	+25.02
Liberal	John Finn	2,481	49.69	-15.11
Total valid votes		4,993	99.11	–
Total rejected ballots		45	0.89	+0.46
Turnout		5,038	55.06	+3.78
Eligible voters		9,150		
Progressive Conservative gain from Liberal		Swing		+20.07

2015 Newfoundland and Labrador general election
Party	Candidate	Votes	%	±%
Liberal	John Finn	3,262	64.80	–
Progressive Conservative	Tony Cornect	1,273	25.29	–
New Democratic	Bernice Hancock	499	9.91	–
Total valid votes		5,034	99.56	–
Total rejected ballots		22	0.44	–
Turnout		5,056	51.28	–
Eligible voters		9,860		
Liberal notional gain from Progressive Conservative		Swing		–
Source: Elections Newfoundland and Labrador

== See also ==
- List of Newfoundland and Labrador provincial electoral districts
- Canadian provincial electoral districts

Newfoundland and Labrador House of Assembly
Preceded by Windsor Lake	Constituency represented by the premier of Newfoundland and Labrador; 2025–present	Incumbent
