= Glenn Littlejohn =

Canadian politician

Member of the Newfoundland and Labrador House of Assembly for Port de Grave
- In office October 27, 2011 – November 27, 2015
- Preceded by: Roland Butler
- Succeeded by: District Abolished

Personal details
- Party: Progressive Conservative

Glenn Littlejohn is a Canadian politician in Newfoundland and Labrador, Canada. Littlejohn was elected to the Newfoundland and Labrador House of Assembly in the 2011 provincial election until his defeat in the 2015 election. A member of the Progressive Conservative Party, he represented the electoral district of Port de Grave.

Littlejohn had previously contested the district unsuccessfully in the 2007 provincial election. Prior to the 2007 election, he also served as Mayor of Bay Roberts.

Following his electoral defeat, Littlejohn worked in the Opposition Office for a period of time. He contested the 2019 provincial election in Harbour Grace-Port de Grave, but was defeated by Liberal incumbent Pam Parsons.

He currently serves as the vice president of the NL PC Party.

== Electoral record ==
2019 Newfoundland and Labrador general election
Party	Candidate	Votes	%	±%
Liberal	Pam Parsons	3,758	52.4	
Progressive Conservative	Glenn Littlejohn	3,408	47.6	
Total valid votes				
Total rejected ballots				
Turnout				
Eligible voters				

2015 Newfoundland and Labrador general election
Party	Candidate	Votes	%	±%
Liberal	Pam Parsons	3,877	61.5	–
Progressive Conservative	Glenn Littlejohn	2,289	36.3	–
New Democratic	Kathleen Burt	133	2.1	–

2011 Newfoundland and Labrador general election
Party	Candidate	Votes	%	±%
Progressive Conservative	Glenn Littlejohn	3,647	60.13%	–
Liberal	Leanne Hussey	2,022	33.34%	
NDP	Sarah Downey	396	6.53%	

2007 Newfoundland and Labrador general election
Party	Candidate	Votes	%	±%
Liberal	Roland Butler	3329	50.75%	
Progressive Conservative	Glenn Littlejohn	3069	46.78%	–
NDP	Randy Wayne Dawe	162	2.47%	
