= 2019 Newfoundland and Labrador general election =

Canadian provincial election

- May 16, 2019

All 40 seats in the 49th House of Assembly of Newfoundland and Labrador 21 seats needed for a majority
- Turnout: 60.6% (▲5.4 pp)
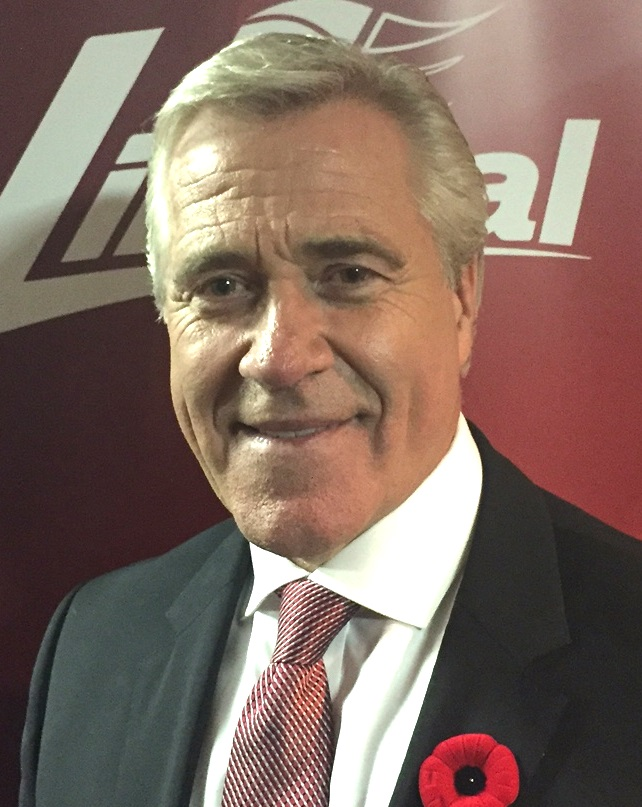

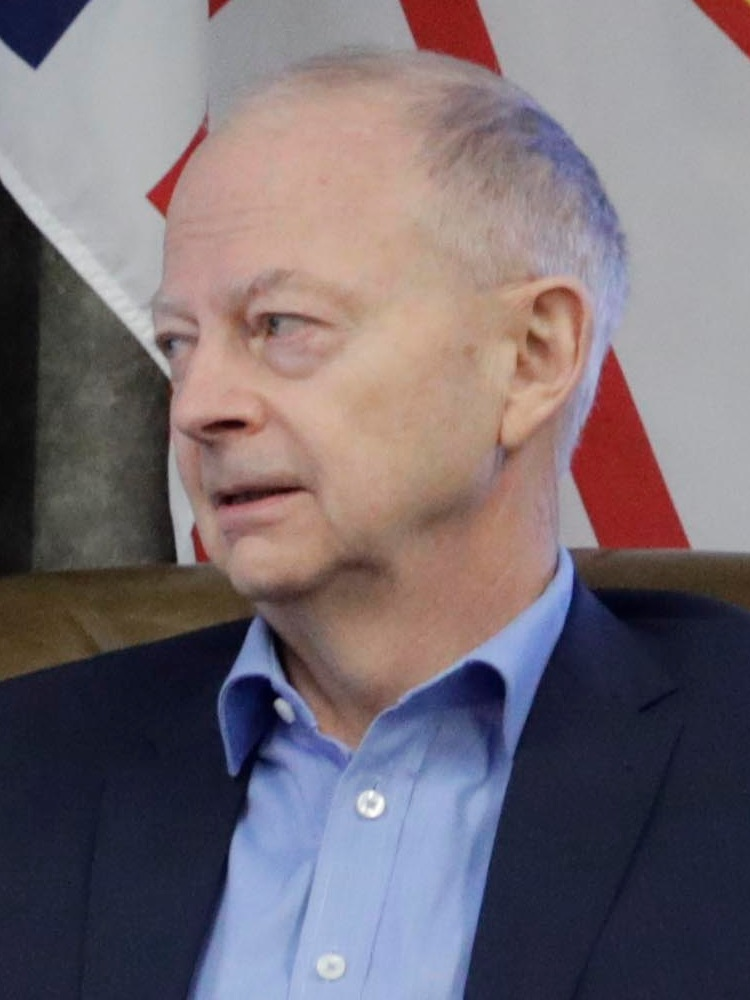

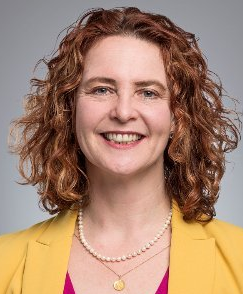
	First party	Second party	Third party
Leader	Dwight Ball	Ches Crosbie	Alison Coffin
Party	Liberal	Progressive Conservative	New Democratic
Leader since	November 17, 2013	April 28, 2018	March 5, 2019
Leader's seat	Humber - Gros Morne	Windsor Lake	St. John's East-Quidi Vidi
Last election	31 seats, 57.16%	7 seats, 30.08%	2 seats, 12.09%
Seats before	27	8	2
Seats won	20	15	3
Seat change	▼7	▲7	▲1
Popular vote	93,746	90,690	13,432
Percentage	44.00%	42.57%	6.30%
Swing	▼13.16pp	▲12.49pp	▼5.79pp
- Popular vote by riding. As this is an FPTP election, seat totals are not determined by popular vote, but instead via results by each riding.
Premier before election
Dwight Ball
Liberal
Premier after election
Dwight Ball
Liberal

The 2019 Newfoundland and Labrador general election was held on May 16, 2019, to elect members of the 49th General Assembly of Newfoundland and Labrador.

Despite consistent Progressive Conservative leads in polling towards the end of the campaign, including a nine-point lead in the final poll released a day before the election, the Liberal Party led by Dwight Ball won re-election, but nonetheless fell one seat short of retaining their majority after an unexpected loss to the New Democrats in Labrador West originally in the initial count by five votes. This resulted in the Liberals winning 20 seats, exactly half of the House of Assembly. A subsequent recount shortened the margin of victory in Labrador West to just two votes.

== Party standings ==
Summary of the House of Assembly of Newfoundland and Labrador election results
Party	Votes	%	+/–	Seats			
Party	Votes	%	+/–	2015	Dissol.	2019	Change
Liberal	93,745	44.00	-13.3	31	27	20	-11
Progressive Conservative	90,689	42.57	+12.5	7	8	15	+8
New Democratic	13,434	6.31	-5.8	2	2	3	+1
NL Alliance	5,086	2.39	New	New	New	0	New
Independents	10,096	4.74	+4.0	0	3	2	+2
Total	213,050	100.00	–	40	40	40	0
Valid votes	213,050	99.18					
Invalid/blank votes	1,757	0.82					
Total votes	214,807	100.00					
Registered voters/turnout	354,136	60.66					

↓
20	15	3	2
Liberal	Progressive Conservative	NDP	Ind

== Incumbents not running for reelection ==
The following MHAs had announced that they would not be running in this provincial election:

Independent

- Dale Kirby (Mount Scio)

New Democratic Party

- Gerry Rogers (St. John's Centre)
- Lorraine Michael (St. John's East-Quidi Vidi)

Progressive Conservative Party

- Keith Hutchings (Ferryland)
- Tracey Perry (Fortune Bay-Cape La Hune)

== Timeline ==
Changes in seats held (2015–2019)

Seat	Before				Change		
Seat	Date	Member	Party	Reason	Date	Member	Party
Mount Pearl-Southlands	May 19, 2016	Paul Lane	█ Liberal	Removed from caucus (Note: as a result of Lane's disapproval of deficit reduction levy)			█ Independent
Mount Pearl North	October 11, 2017	Steve Kent	█ PC	Resignation (Note: becoming Chief Administrative Officer for the City of Mount Pearl)	November 21, 2017	Jim Lester	█ PC
Humber-Bay of Islands	April 26, 2018	Eddie Joyce	█ Liberal	Removed from caucus (Note: amid allegations of harassment)			█ Independent
Mount Scio	April 30, 2018	Dale Kirby	█ Liberal	Removed from caucus			█ Independent
Windsor Lake	August 21, 2018	Cathy Bennett	█ Liberal	Resignation	September 20, 2018	Ches Crosbie	█ PC
Topsail-Paradise	November 1, 2018	Paul Davis	█ PC	Resignation	January 24, 2019	Paul Dinn	█ PC

2015

- November 30, 2015 – The Liberal Party of Newfoundland and Labrador wins 31 of the 40 seats in the House of Assembly during the general election ending 12 years of Progressive Conservative rule and defeating incumbent premier Paul Davis.

2016

- May 19, 2016 - Liberal MHA Paul Lane is suspended from the Liberal caucus and sits as an independent MHA.
- October 11, 2016 - Former premier Paul Davis announces he'll resign as Tory leader once his successor is chosen.

2017

- July 31, 2017 - A cabinet shuffle takes place after Cathy Bennett resigns as Finance Minister. Dempster and Osborne enter cabinet.
- September 19, 2017 - NDP Leader Earle McCurdy announced his resignation as Party Leader, effective September 30.
- September 28, 2017 - NDP MHA Lorraine Michael is named interim leader of the NDP replacing Earle McCurdy who announced his resignation earlier in the month.
- October 11, 2017 - Mount Pearl North PC MHA Steve Kent resigns to become Chief Administrative Officer of Mount Pearl triggering a by-election.
- November 21, 2017 - Jim Lester (PC) is elected as MHA for Mount Pearl North.

2018

- April 8, 2018 - Gerry Rogers is elected as the leader of the New Democrats, succeeding Lorraine Michael.
- April 25, 2018 - Municipal Affairs Minister Eddie Joyce is formally accused of inappropriate conduct by another Liberal MHA. He is subsequently removed from cabinet and caucus pending the outcome of an external investigation.
- April 28, 2018 - Ches Crosbie is elected as the new leader of the Progressive Conservatives, succeeding Paul Davis.
- April 30, 2018 - Minister of Education and Early Childhood Development Dale Kirby is removed from cabinet and caucus following allegations of harassment.
- May 13, 2018 - Paul Davis announces his resignation as Leader of the Opposition. Since PC leader Ches Crosbie does not have a seat in the House of Assembly MHA David Brazil was appointed Leader of the Opposition on May 14, 2018.
- June 16, 2018 - Delegates at the Liberal Party Annual General Meeting vote to endorse the leadership of Dwight Ball with 79% voting against the party holding a leadership convention.
- August 21, 2018 - Liberal MHA Cathy Bennett resigns her seat of Windsor Lake.
- August 27, 2018 - CBC releases a copy of a report by the Commissioner for Legislative Standards that clears Eddie Joyce and Dale Kirby of wrongdoing in all the allegations made by fellow Liberal MHA Colin Holloway.
- September 20, 2018 - Ches Crosbie (PC) is elected as MHA for Windsor Lake.
- October 18, 2018 - Paul Davis (PC) announces his intention to resign as MHA for Topsail-Paradise on November 2.
- October 20, 2018 - MHA Dale Kirby leaks the results of the Commissioner for Legislative Standards report regarding MHA Pam Parsons’ complaint against him to the public. Kirby was cleared on all complaints, except making an inappropriate comment to Parsons at the 2016 Liberal Party AGM; the report recommended a sanction by the House of Assembly on that count.
- October 21, 2018 - The Joyce report is leaked to the public which found that Joyce had broken the code of conduct for elected officials when he lobbied Minister Gambin-Walsh to hire a friend of his for a government job; Joyce was cleared on all other allegations.
- October 30, 2018 - PC party president Graydon Pelley resigns and creates a new political party, the NL Alliance.
- November 8, 2018 - Cabinet shuffle takes place MHAs Davis, Haley, and Letto promoted to cabinet.
- November 16, 2018 - MHA Eddie Joyce confirms he has been denied re-entry into the Liberal caucus.

2019

- January 24, 2019 - Paul Dinn (PC) is elected as MHA for Topsail-Paradise.
- February 12, 2019 - NDP Leader Gerry Rogers announced she would be stepping down as leader and not seeking re-election in 2019.
- March 5, 2019 - Alison Coffin is acclaimed leader of the NDP.
- April 12, 2019 - The NL Alliance is officially registered as a political party in Newfoundland and Labrador.
- April 16, 2019 - Budget is tabled in the House of Assembly.
- April 17, 2019 - Premier Ball visits Lt. Gov. Judy Foote and the writ is dropped.
- June 21, 2019 - A judicial recount confirms Jordan Brown as MHA for Labrador West by a two-vote margin.

== Opinion polls ==
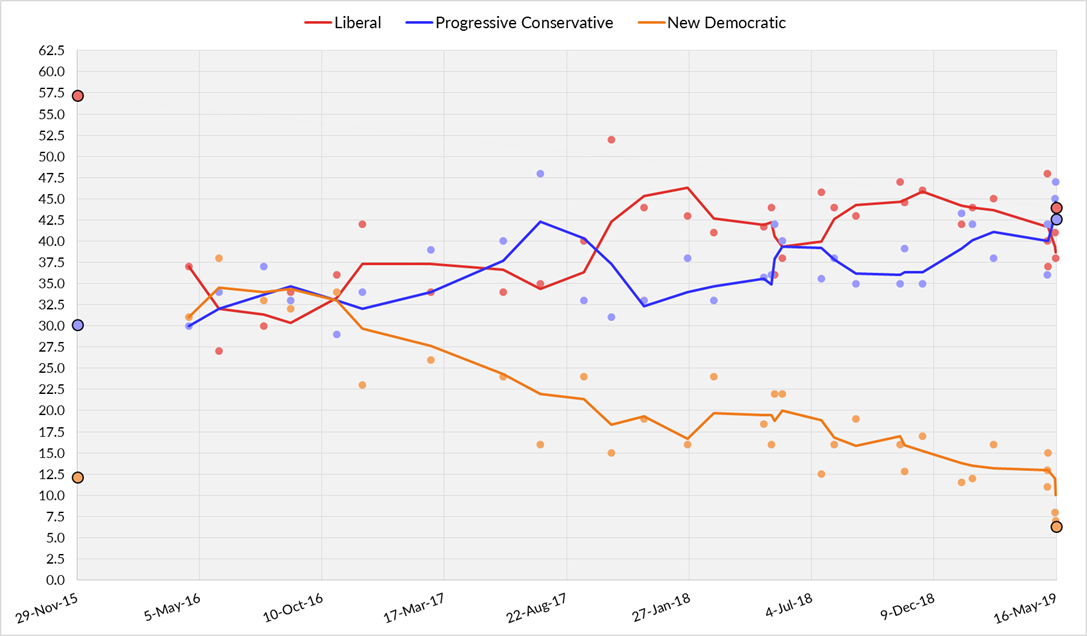

Polling Firm	Last Day of Polling	Link	Liberal	PC	NDP	NLA
Forum Research	May 15, 2019	PDF	38	47	7	
Mainstreet Research	May 14, 2019	HTML	41	45	8	3
Abacus Data	May 5, 2019	HTML	37	42	15	
Forum Research	May 4, 2019	PDF	40	42	13	
MQO Research	May 4, 2019	PDF	48	36	11	2
Corporate Research Associates Inc.	February 24, 2019	PDF	45	38	16	
MQO Research	January 28, 2019	PDF	44	42	12	
Mainstreet Research	January 14, 2019	HTML	42	43.3	11.5	
Corporate Research Associates Inc.	November 24, 2018	PDF	46	35	17	
Mainstreet Research	November 1, 2018	HTML	44.6	39.1	12.8	
MQO Research	October 26, 2018	PDF	47	35	16	
Corporate Research Associates Inc.	August 30, 2018	PDF	43	35	19	
MQO Research	August 2, 2018	PDF	44	38	16	
Mainstreet Research	July 17, 2018	HTML	45.8	35.6	12.5	
Abacus Data	May 27, 2018	HTML	38	40	22	
Corporate Research Associates Inc.	May 17, 2018	PDF	36	42	22	
MQO Research	May 13, 2018	PDF	44	36	16	
Mainstreet Research	May 3, 2018	HTML	41.7	35.7	18.4	
Corporate Research Associates Inc.	February 28, 2018	PDF	41	33	24	
MQO Research	January 25, 2018	PDF	43	38	16	
Corporate Research Associates Inc.	November 30, 2017	PDF	44	33	19	
MQO Research	October 19, 2017	PDF	52	31	15	
Corporate Research Associates Inc.	September 13, 2017	PDF	40	33	24	
MQO Research	July 19, 2017	PDF	35	48	16	
Corporate Research Associates Inc.	June 1, 2017	PDF	34	40	24	
MQO Research	April 26, 2017	PDF	37	39	23	
Corporate Research Associates Inc.	February 28, 2017	PDF	33	39	26	
MQO Research	January 23, 2017	PDF	43	36	20	
Corporate Research Associates Inc.	December 1, 2016	PDF	42	34	23	
Abacus Data	October 29, 2016	PDF	36	29	34	
MQO Research	October 22, 2016	PDF	40	31	27	
Corporate Research Associates Inc.	August 31, 2016	PDF	34	33	32	
MQO Research	July 27, 2016	PDF	30	37	33	
Corporate Research Associates Inc.	May 30, 2016	PDF	27	34	38	
MQO Research	April 21, 2016	PDF	37	30	31	
Corporate Research Associates Inc.	March 9, 2016	PDF	66	23	11	
Election 2015	November 30, 2015	–	57.2	30.1	12.1	

== Results by region ==
Party Name		St. John's	Avalon/St. John's Metro	Central/Eastern	Western	Labrador	Total
Parties winning seats in the legislature:
Liberal	Seats:	4	3	6	5	2	20
Liberal	Popular Vote:	15,989	24,884	29,040	19,344	4,489	93,746
Progressive Conservative	Seats:	1	7	5	1	1	15
Progressive Conservative	Popular Vote:	11,578	36,642	28,136	11,461	2,873	90,690
New Democratic	Seats:	2	0	0	0	1	3
New Democratic	Popular Vote:	9,704	1,321	0	1,043	1,364	13,432
Others	Seats:	0	1	0	1	0	2
Others	Popular Vote:	406	6,703	2,482	4,988	603	15,182

== Candidates by district ==
- All candidate names are those on the official list of confirmed candidates; names in media or on party website may differ slightly.
- Names in **boldface type** represent party leaders.
- † represents that the incumbent is not running again.
- § represents that the incumbent was defeated for nomination.
- ₰ represents that the incumbent ran in another district and lost the nomination
- ‡ represents that the incumbent is running in a different district.

=== St. John's ===
Electoral district	Candidates				Incumbent
Electoral district	Liberal	PC	NDP	Alliance	Incumbent
Mount Scio; 54.51% turnout	Sarah Stoodley; 1,981; 41.68%	Lloyd Power; 1,769; 37.21%	Jason R. Mercer; 597; 12.56%	**Graydon Pelley**; 406; 8.54%	Dale Kirby†
St. John's Centre; 48.60% turnout	Seamus O'Keefe; 1,207; 25.54%	Jonathan Galgay; 1,301; 27.53%	Jim Dinn; 2,218; 46.93%		Gerry Rogers†
St. John's East-Quidi Vidi; 58.03% turnout	George Murphy; 2,072; 33.38%	David Porter; 1,436; 23.14%	**Alison Coffin**; 2,699; 43.48%		Lorraine Michael†
St. John's West; 57.31% turnout	Siobhan Coady; 2,393; 45.69%	Shane Skinner; 2,211; 42.22%	Brenda Walsh; 633; 12.09%		Siobhan Coady
Virginia Waters-Pleasantville; 63.64% turnout	Bernard Davis; 2,761; 44.25%	Beth Crosbie; 2,217; 35.53%	Jenn Deon; 1,262; 20.22%		Bernard Davis
Waterford Valley; 52.54% turnout	Tom Osborne; 3,487; 68.56%		Matthew Cooper; 1,599; 31.44%		Tom Osborne
Windsor Lake; 59.65% turnout	Bob Osborne; 2,088; 38.47%	**Ches Crosbie**; 2,644; 48.71%	Tomás Shea; 696; 12.82%		**Ches Crosbie**

=== St. John's suburbs ===
Electoral district	Candidates					Incumbent
Electoral district	Liberal	PC	NDP	Alliance	Other	Incumbent
Cape St. Francis; 71.40% turnout	Michael Duffy; 1,115; 17.75%	Kevin Parsons; 4,539; 72.24%	Peter Beck; 396; 6.30%	Ryan Lane; 233; 3.71%		Kevin Parsons
Conception Bay East – Bell Island; 55.56% turnout	Cyril Hayden; 1,551; 26.22%	David Brazil; 4,365; 73.78%				David Brazil
Conception Bay South; 61.85% turnout	Kevin Baker; 1,256; 22.78%	Barry Petten; 3,447; 62.52%		Warrick Butler; 810; 14.69%		Barry Petten
Mount Pearl North; 57.88% turnout	Nicole Kieley; 2,196; 37.20%	Jim Lester; 2,907; 49.24%	Carol Reade; 358; 6.06%	William Neville; 443; 7.50%		Jim Lester
Mount Pearl-Southlands; 65.71% turnout	Hasan Hai; 1,826; 28.30%	Gillian Pearson; 1,590; 24.64%	David Brake; 214; 3.32%		Paul Lane (Ind.); 2,823; 43.75%	Paul Lane
Topsail-Paradise; 54.75% turnout	Patricia Hynes-Coates; 1,650; 28.95%	Paul Dinn; 3,476; 60.98%		Lori Best-Moore; 574; 10.07%		Paul Dinn

=== Avalon Peninsula ===
Electoral district	Candidates				Incumbent
Electoral district	Liberal	PC	NDP	Other	Incumbent
Carbonear-Trinity-Bay de Verde; 66.57% turnout	Steve Crocker; 4,292; 60.28%	Jason Oliver; 2,422; 34.02%	Kathleen Burt; 353; 4.96%	Edward Thomas Cole (Ind.); 53; 0.74%	Steve Crocker
Ferryland; 69.27% turnout	Janice Ryan; 2,350; 34.95%	Loyola O'Driscoll; 4,074; 60.59%		Chris Molloy (Ind.); 300; 4.46%	Keith Hutchings†
Harbour Grace-Port de Grave; 71.18% turnout	Pam Parsons; 3,758; 52.24%	Glenn Littlejohn; 3,408; 47.56%			Pam Parsons
Harbour Main; 69.85% turnout	Betty Parsley; 2,126; 30.64%	Helen Conway-Ottenheimer; 4,169; 60.08%		Mike Cooze (NL Alliance); 643; 9.27%	Betty Parsley
Placentia-St. Mary's; 65.69% turnout	Sherry Gambin-Walsh; 2,764; 47.39%	Hilda Whelan; 2,245; 38.49%		Steve Thorne (Ind.); 824; 14.13%	Sherry Gambin-Walsh

=== Eastern Newfoundland ===
Electoral district	Candidates			Incumbent
Electoral district	Liberal	PC	Alliance	Incumbent
Bonavista; 59.36% turnout	Neil King; 2,566; 49.57%	Craig Pardy; 2,611; 50.43%		Neil King
Burin-Grand Bank; 65.70% turnout	Carol Anne Haley; 2,822; 51.62%	Bill Matthews; 2,645; 48.38%		Carol Anne Haley
Placentia West-Bellevue; 65.69% turnout	Mark Browne; 2,667; 44.23%	Jeff Dwyer; 3,363; 55.77%		Mark Browne
Terra Nova; 64.25% turnout	Colin Holloway; 2,595; 43.47%	Lloyd Parrott; 2,876; 48.17%	Barry Moores; 499; 8.36%	Colin Holloway

=== Central Newfoundland ===
Electoral district	Candidates			Incumbent
Electoral district	Liberal	PC	Other	Incumbent
Baie Verte-Green Bay; 59.96% turnout	Brian Warr; 2,809; 49.73%	Neville Robinson; 1,872; 33.14%	Ben Callahan (NL Alliance); 968; 17.14%	Brian Warr
Exploits; 64.65% turnout	Jerry Dean; 1,924; 33.10%	Pleaman Forsey; 2,874; 49.44%	Gloria Cooper (Ind.); 1,015; 17.46%	Jerry Dean
Fogo Island-Cape Freels; 52.10% turnout	Derrick Bragg; 2,811; 54.31%	Sue Collins; 2,365; 45.69%		Derrick Bragg
Fortune Bay-Cape La Hune; 61.20% turnout	Elvis Loveless; 1,759; 53.38%	Charlene Walsh; 1,536; 46.62%		Tracey Perry†
Gander; 61.60% turnout	John Haggie; 3,311; 58.57%	Ryan Wagg; 2,342; 41.43%		John Haggie
Grand Falls-Windsor-Buchans; 60.75% turnout	Al Hawkins; 2,586; 46.84%	Chris Tibbs; 2,935; 53.16%		Al Hawkins
Lewisporte-Twillingate; 60.69% turnout	Derek Bennett; 3,190; 54.00%	Krista Freake; 2,717; 46.00%		Derek Bennett

=== Western Newfoundland ===
Electoral district	Candidates				Incumbent
Electoral district	Liberal	PC	NDP	Other	Incumbent
Burgeo-La Poile; 52.13% turnout	Andrew Parsons; 2,947; 83.46%	Deborah Ann Turner; 584; 16.54%			Andrew Parsons
Corner Brook; 49.87% turnout	Gerry Byrne; 2,436; 48.85%	Tom Stewart; 1,682; 33.73%	Mary B. Feltham; 733; 14.70%	Wayne Bennett (Ind.); 136; 2.73%	Gerry Byrne
Humber-Gros Morne; 68.11% turnout	**Dwight Ball**; 4,247; 69.94%	Greg Osmond; 1,825; 30.06%			**Dwight Ball**
Humber-Bay of Islands; 62.65% turnout	Brian Dicks; 1,068; 17.20%	Michael Patrick Holden; 659; 10.61%	Shawn A. Hodder; 310; 4.99%	Eddie Joyce (Ind.); 4,172; 67.19%	Eddie Joyce
St. Barbe-L'Anse aux Meadows; 64.85% turnout	Chris Mitchelmore; 3,474; 61.16%	Sheila Fitzgerald; 2,036; 35.85%		Ford Mitchelmore (Ind.); 170; 2.99%	Chris Mitchelmore
St. George's-Humber; 60.23% turnout	Scott Reid; 2,691; 50.17%	Tom O’Brien; 2,163; 40.32%		Shane Snook (NL Alliance); 510; 9.51%	Scott Reid
Stephenville-Port au Port; 55.06% turnout	John Finn; 2,481; 49.67%	Tony Wakeham; 2,512; 50.31%			John Finn

=== Labrador ===
Electoral district	Candidates				Incumbent
Electoral district	Liberal	PC	NDP	Other	Incumbent
Cartwright-L'Anse au Clair; 58.80% turnout	Lisa Dempster; 1,132; 67.22%			Michael Normore (Ind.) (Note: Although Normore was expelled from the party due to his stance against same-sex marriage and abortion, he remained on the ballot as a Progressive Conservative candidate.); 552; 32.78%	Lisa Dempster
Labrador West; 54.21% turnout	Graham Letto; 1,362; 42.07%	Derick Sharron; 509; 15.73%	Jordan Brown; 1,364; 42.16%		Graham Letto
Lake Melville; 55.62% turnout	Perry Trimper; 1,517; 45.84%	Shannon Tobin; 1,189; 35.93%		Jim Learning (Ind.); 603; 18.22%	Perry Trimper
Torngat Mountains; 55.24% turnout	Randy Edmunds; 478; 43.42%	Lela Evans; 623; 55.58%			Randy Edmunds

== Results ==
The Liberals lost their parliamentary majority.

=== Incumbent MHAs who were defeated ===
Party	Name	Constituency	Year elected	Seat held by party since	Defeated by	Party
Liberal Party of Newfoundland and Labrador	Betty Parsley	Harbour Main	2015	2015	Helen Conway-Ottenheimer	Progressive Conservative Party of Newfoundland and Labrador
Liberal Party of Newfoundland and Labrador	Neil King	Bonavista	2015	2015	Craig Pardy	Progressive Conservative Party of Newfoundland and Labrador
Liberal Party of Newfoundland and Labrador	Mark Browne	Placentia West-Bellevue	2015	2015	Jeff Dwyer	Progressive Conservative Party of Newfoundland and Labrador
Liberal Party of Newfoundland and Labrador	Colin Holloway	Terra Nova	2015	2015	Lloyd Parrott	Progressive Conservative Party of Newfoundland and Labrador
Liberal Party of Newfoundland and Labrador	Jerry Dean	Exploits	2015	2015	Pleaman Forsey	Progressive Conservative Party of Newfoundland and Labrador
Liberal Party of Newfoundland and Labrador	Al Hawkins	Grand Falls-Windsor-Buchans	2015	2015	Chris Tibbs	Progressive Conservative Party of Newfoundland and Labrador
Liberal Party of Newfoundland and Labrador	John Finn	Stephenville-Port au Port	2015	2015	Tony Wakeham	Progressive Conservative Party of Newfoundland and Labrador
Liberal Party of Newfoundland and Labrador	Graham Letto	Labrador West	2015	2015	Jordan Brown	Newfoundland and Labrador New Democratic Party
Liberal Party of Newfoundland and Labrador	Randy Edmunds	Torngat Mountains	2011	2011	Lela Evans	Progressive Conservative Party of Newfoundland and Labrador
