= Harbour Grace-Port de Grave =

Provincial electoral district in Newfoundland and Labrador, Canada

Newfoundland and Labrador electoral district

Provincial electoral district
- Legislature: Newfoundland and Labrador House of Assembly
MHA
Pam Parsons
Liberal
- District created: 2015
- First contested: 2015
- Last contested: 2025

Demographics
- Census subdivision: Bay Roberts

Harbour Grace-Port de Grave is a provincial electoral district in Newfoundland and Labrador, Canada, which is represented by one member in the Newfoundland and Labrador House of Assembly. It was contested for the first time in the 2015 provincial election.

The district was preceded by Port de Grave.

== Members of the House of Assembly ==
The district has elected the following members of the House of Assembly:

Assembly	Years	Member	Party
48th	2015–2019	Pam Parsons	Liberal
49th	2019–2021	Pam Parsons	Liberal
50th	2021–2025	Pam Parsons	Liberal
51st	2025–Present	Pam Parsons	Liberal

== Election results ==
Graph of election results (minor parties that never got 2% of the vote or did not run consistently are omitted) View source data.

2025 Newfoundland and Labrador general election
Party	Candidate	Votes	%	±%
Liberal	Pam Parsons	3,750	59.20	-11.89
Progressive Conservative	Walter Yetman	2,241	35.38	+10.97
Independent	Alison Coffin	233	3.68	
New Democratic	Darian Vincent	110	1.74	-2.75
Total valid votes		6,334		
Total rejected ballots				
Turnout				
Eligible voters				
Liberal hold		Swing		-11.43

2021 Newfoundland and Labrador general election
Party	Candidate	Votes	%	±%
Liberal	Pam Parsons	3,404	71.09	+18.65
Progressive Conservative	Roy Sparkes	1,169	24.42	-23.14
New Democratic	Dion Hynes	215	4.49	
Total valid votes		4,788	99.65	
Total rejected ballots		17	0.35	
Turnout		4,805	44.35	
Eligible voters		10,835		
Liberal hold		Swing		+20.90
Source: Elections Newfoundland and Labrador

2019 Newfoundland and Labrador general election
Party	Candidate	Votes	%	±%
Liberal	Pam Parsons	3,758	52.4	-9.2
Progressive Conservative	Glenn Littlejohn	3,408	47.6	+11.3
Total valid votes		7,166	100	
Total rejected ballots		72		
Turnout		7,238	71.2	+11.7
Eligible voters		10,168		

2015 Newfoundland and Labrador general election
Party	Candidate	Votes	%
Liberal	Pam Parsons	3,877	61.55
Progressive Conservative	Glenn Littlejohn	2,289	36.34
New Democratic	Kathleen Burt	133	2.11
Total valid votes		6,299	99.62
Total rejected ballots		24	0.38
Turnout		6,323	59.51
Eligible voters		10,625	
Source: Elections Newfoundland and Labrador

== See also ==
- List of Newfoundland and Labrador provincial electoral districts
- Canadian provincial electoral districts
