= Placentia West-Bellevue =

Provincial electoral district in Newfoundland and Labrador, Canada

Newfoundland and Labrador electoral district

Provincial electoral district
- Legislature: Newfoundland and Labrador House of Assembly
MHA
Jeff Dwyer
Progressive Conservative
- District created: 2015
- First contested: 2015
- Last contested: 2025

Demographics
- Population (2011): 13,554
- Electors (2015): 9,698
- Area (km²): 4,645
- Census division(s): Division No. 1, Division No. 2, Division No. 3
- Census subdivision(s): Arnold's Cove, Baine Harbour, Chance Cove, Chapel Arm, Come By Chance, Division No. 1, Subd. A, Division No. 2, Subd. C, Division No. 2, Subd. D, Division No. 2, Subd. I, Division No. 2, Subd. J, Division No. 2, Subd. K, Division No. 2, Subd. L, Division No. 3, Subd. A, English Harbour East, Grand le Pierre, Long Harbour-Mount Arlington Heights, Marystown, Norman's Cove-Long Cove, Parker's Cove, Red Harbour, Rushoon, Southern Harbour, Sunnyside, Terrenceville

Placentia West-Bellevue is a provincial electoral district in Newfoundland and Labrador, Canada, which is represented by one member in the Newfoundland and Labrador House of Assembly. It was contested for the first time in the 2015 provincial election.

The district was created following the 2015 redistribution which saw the elimination of the district of Bellevue. The district was largely preceded by the district of Burin-Placentia West which was abolished in 2015. Marystown is the largest population centre in the district.

The district contains an intra-provincial ferry servicing South East Bight.

== Members of the House of Assembly ==
The district has elected the following members of the House of Assembly:

Assembly	Years	Member	Party
48th	2015–2019	Mark Browne	Liberal
49th	2019–2021	Jeff Dwyer	Progressive Conservative
50th	2021–2025	Jeff Dwyer	Progressive Conservative
51st	2025–present	Jeff Dwyer	Progressive Conservative

== Election results ==
Graph of election results (minor parties that never got 2% of the vote or did not run consistently are omitted) View source data.

2025 Newfoundland and Labrador general election
Party	Candidate	Votes	%	±%
Progressive Conservative	Jeff Dwyer	2,641	47.1%	-7.22
Liberal	Brian Keating	2,577	46.0%	+3.79
New Democratic	Jasmine Paul	388	6.9%	+3.44
Total valid votes				
Total rejected ballots				
Turnout				
Eligible voters				
Progressive Conservative hold		Swing		-

2021 Newfoundland and Labrador general election
Party	Candidate	Votes	%	±%
Progressive Conservative	Jeff Dwyer	2,965	54.32	-1.45
Liberal	Sam Synard	2,304	42.21	-2.02
New Democratic	Carolyn Davis	189	3.46	
Total valid votes		5,458	99.25	
Total rejected ballots		41	0.75	
Turnout		5,499	56.84	
Eligible voters		9,674		
Progressive Conservative hold		Swing		+0.28
Source(s) "Officially Nominated Candidates General Election 2021" (PDF). Elections Newfoundland and Labrador. "NL Election 2021 Report" (PDF).

2019 Newfoundland and Labrador general election
Party	Candidate	Votes	%	±%
Progressive Conservative	Jeff Dwyer	3,363	55.77	+22.02
Liberal	Mark Browne	2,667	44.23	-19.47
Total valid votes		6,030	99.10	
Total rejected ballots		55	0.90	+0.63
Turnout		6,085	65.71	+6.54
Eligible voters		9,261		
Progressive Conservative gain from Liberal		Swing		+20.75

2015 Newfoundland and Labrador general election
Party	Candidate	Votes	%	±%
Liberal	Mark Browne	3,645	63.70	–
Progressive Conservative	Calvin Peach	1,931	33.75	–
New Democratic	Bobbie Warren	146	2.55	–
Total valid votes		5,722	99.72	–
Total rejected ballots		16	0.28	–
Turnout		5,738	59.17	–
Eligible voters		9,698		
Liberal notional gain from Progressive Conservative		Swing		–
Source: Elections Newfoundland and Labrador

== See also ==
- List of Newfoundland and Labrador provincial electoral districts
- Canadian provincial electoral districts
