= Mark Browne (politician) =

Canadian politician

Mark Browne MHA

Member of the Newfoundland and Labrador House of Assembly for Placentia West-Bellevue
- In office November 30, 2015 – April 17, 2019
- Preceded by: Riding Established
- Succeeded by: Jeff Dwyer

Personal details
- Born: May 20, 1993 (age 33) Burin, Newfoundland and Labrador
- Party: Liberal

Mark Browne is a former Canadian politician, who served in the Newfoundland and Labrador House of Assembly from 2015 until his defeat in the 2019 election. He represented the electoral district of Placentia West-Bellevue as a member of the Liberal Party.

He previously served as an assistant to federal MP Judy Foote, and as a political assistant in the Office of the Official Opposition.

During his term as MHA he served as parliamentary assistant to Premier Dwight Ball.

Upon his election to the House of Assembly, Browne was the youngest MHA to ever be elected at 22. This record has not been broken since.

Browne was defeated in the 2019 General Election.
