= Humber-Gros Morne =

Provincial electoral district in Newfoundland and Labrador, Canada

Humber - Gros Morne
Newfoundland and Labrador electoral district

Provincial electoral district
- Legislature: Newfoundland and Labrador House of Assembly
MHA
Mike Goosney
Progressive Conservative
- District created: 2015
- First contested: 2015
- Last contested: 2025

Demographics
- Population (2011): 12,509
- Area (km²): 12,665
- Census division(s): Division No. 5, Division No. 6, Division No. 8, Division No. 9
- Census subdivision(s): Bellburns, Cormack, Cow Head, Daniel's Harbour, Deer Lake, Division No. 5, Subd. A, Division No. 5, Subd. D, Division No. 5, Subd. E, Division No. 5, Subd. G, Division No. 6, Subd. C, Division No. 8, Subd. A, Division No. 9, Subd. A, Division No. 9, Subd. F, Division No. 9, Subd. G, Division No. 9, Subd. H, Glenburnie-Birchy Head-Shoal Brook, Hampden, Howley, Jackson's Arm, Norris Point, Parson's Pond, Reidville, Rocky Harbour, Sally's Cove, St. Pauls, Trout River, Woody Point, Bonne Bay

Humber-Gros Morne is a provincial electoral district in Newfoundland and Labrador, Canada. In 2011 there were 12,509 people living in the district.

Humber-Gros Morne includes part of the former district of St. Barbe and most of the former district of Humber Valley. The district was created following the 2015 electoral districts boundaries review.

The district includes Deer Lake and surrounding communities (Howley and Reidville) as well as the southern half of the Great Northern Peninsula. Bellburns is the district's northern limit on the west side and Jackson's Arm is the northern limit on the east side. Other notable communities in this district include Cormack, Cow Head, Hampden and Rocky Harbour.

The district was formerly represented by Premiers Dwight Ball and Andrew Furey.

== Members of the House of Assembly ==
The district has elected the following members of the House of Assembly:

Assembly	Years	Member	Party
St. Barbe & Humber Valley prior to 2015
48th	2015–2019	Dwight Ball	Liberal
49th	2019–2020	Dwight Ball	Liberal
49th	2020–2021	Andrew Furey	Liberal
50th	2021–2025	Andrew Furey	Liberal
51st	2025–present	Mike Goosney	Progressive Conservative

== Election results ==
Graph of election results (minor parties that never got 2% of the vote or did not run consistently are omitted) View source data.

2025 Newfoundland and Labrador general election
Party	Candidate	Votes	%	±%
Progressive Conservative	Mike Goosney	3,238	58.05	+24.42
Liberal	Helen Reid	2,093	37.52	-26.44
New Democratic	Rebecca Brushett	247	4.43	+2.02
Total valid votes		5,578		
Total rejected ballots				
Turnout				
Eligible voters				
Progressive Conservative gain from Liberal		Swing		+25.43

2021 Newfoundland and Labrador general election
Party	Candidate	Votes	%	±%
Liberal	Andrew Furey	2,838	63.96	+0.01
Progressive Conservative	Jim Goudie	1,492	33.63	+8.58
New Democratic	Sheina Lerman	107	2.41	+0.14
Total valid votes		4,437	99.48	
Total rejected ballots		23	0.52	
Turnout		4,460	44.83	
Eligible voters		9,948		
Liberal hold		Swing		-4.28
Source(s) "Officially Nominated Candidates General Election 2021" (PDF). Elections Newfoundland and Labrador. "NL Election 2021 (Unofficial Results)".

Humber-Gros Morne - By-election, 6 October 2020 Resignation of Dwight Ball
Party	Candidate	Votes	%	±%
Liberal	Andrew Furey	3,401	63.95	-5.99
Progressive Conservative	Mike Goosney	1,332	25.05	-5.01
NL Alliance	Graydon Pelley	464	8.73	+8.73
New Democratic	Graham Downey-Sutton	121	2.28	+2.28
Total valid votes		5,318	55.11	-13.00
Eligible voters		9,650		
Liberal hold		Swing		-0.49

2019 Newfoundland and Labrador general election
Party	Candidate	Votes	%	±%
Liberal	Dwight Ball	4,247	69.94	-6.04
Progressive Conservative	Greg Osmond	1,825	30.06	+13.85
Total valid votes		6,072	98.96	
Total rejected ballots		64	1.04	+0.76
Turnout		6,136	68.11	+3.47
Eligible voters		9,009		
Liberal hold		Swing		-9.95

2015 Newfoundland and Labrador general election
Party	Candidate	Votes	%
Liberal	Dwight Ball	4,610	75.98
Progressive Conservative	Graydon Pelley	983	16.20
New Democratic	Mike Goosney	474	7.81
Total valid votes		6,067	99.72
Total rejected ballots		17	0.28
Turnout		6,084	64.64
Eligible voters		9,412	

== See also ==
- List of Newfoundland and Labrador provincial electoral districts
- Canadian provincial electoral districts

Newfoundland and Labrador House of Assembly
Preceded by Topsail	Constituency represented by the premier of Newfoundland and Labrador; 2015–2025	Succeeded by Windsor Lake
