= Mount Scio =

Provincial electoral district in Newfoundland and Labrador, Canada

Coordinates: 47°33′36″N 52°42′41.1″W

Newfoundland and Labrador electoral district
- Location in the St. John's area

Provincial electoral district
- Legislature: Newfoundland and Labrador House of Assembly
MHA
Sarah Stoodley
Liberal
- District created: 2015
- First contested: 2015
- Last contested: 2025

Demographics
- Population (2011): 14,482
- Electors (2015): 8,648
- Area (km²): 35
- Census division: Division No. 1
- Census subdivision(s): St. John's, Paradise

Mount Scio is a provincial electoral district in Newfoundland and Labrador, Canada. In 2011 there were 14,482 people living in the district. Mount Scio includes part of the town of Paradise and part of the city of St. John's. The district was created following the 2015 electoral districts boundaries review. The majority of Mount Scio was previously the district of St. John's North. The district also includes parts of the former districts of Mount Pearl North, St. John's East, and Topsail.

Former Liberal Cabinet Minister Dale Kirby was the district's MHA from 2015 until he retired in 2019. Sarah Stoodley, an insurance firm communications specialist, was elected for the Liberal Party in 2019.

== Members of the House of Assembly ==
Assembly	Years	Member	Party
Riding created from St. John's North, Mount Pearl North, St. John's East, and Topsail
48th	2015–2018	Dale Kirby	Liberal
48th	2018–2019	Dale Kirby	Independent
49th	2019–2021	Sarah Stoodley	Liberal
50th	2021–2025	Sarah Stoodley	Liberal
51st	2025–present	Sarah Stoodley	Liberal

== Election results ==
Graph of election results (minor parties that never got 2% of the vote or did not run consistently are omitted) View source data.

2025 Newfoundland and Labrador general election
Party	Candidate	Votes	%	±%
Liberal	Sarah Stoodley	2,006	46.13	-0.47
Progressive Conservative	Darrell Hynes	1,551	35.66	+8.96
New Democratic	Laurabel Mba	792	18.21	-6.68
Total valid votes		4,349		
Total rejected ballots				
Turnout				
Eligible voters				
Liberal hold		Swing		-4.73%

2021 Newfoundland and Labrador general election
Party	Candidate	Votes	%	±%
Liberal	Sarah Stoodley	2,011	46.60	+4.93
Progressive Conservative	Damian Follett	1,152	26.70	-10.52
New Democratic	Sheilagh O'Leary	1,074	24.89	+12.33
NL Alliance	Andrea Newbury	60	1.39	-7.15
Independent	Larry Borne	18	0.42	
Total valid votes		4,315		
Total rejected ballots				
Turnout				
Eligible voters				
Liberal hold		Swing		+7.72
Source(s) "Officially Nominated Candidates General Election 2021" (PDF). Elections Newfoundland and Labrador. "NL Election 2021 (Unofficial Results)".

2019 Newfoundland and Labrador general election
Party	Candidate	Votes	%	±%
Liberal	Sarah Stoodley	1,981	41.68	-5.41
Progressive Conservative	Lloyd Power	1,769	37.22	+9.84
New Democratic	Jason R. Mercer	597	12.56	-12.98
NL Alliance	Graydon Pelley	406	8.54	
Total valid votes		4,753	99.69	
Total rejected ballots		15	0.31	-0.08
Turnout		4,768	54.51	+7.69
Electors on the lists		8,747	–	
Liberal hold		Swing		-7.63
Source: Elections Canada

2015 Newfoundland and Labrador general election
Party	Candidate	Votes	%
Liberal	Dale Kirby	1,899	47.09
Progressive Conservative	Rhonda Churchill Herder	1,104	27.37
New Democratic	Sean Panting	1,030	25.54
Total valid votes		4,033	99.60
Total rejected ballots		16	0.40
Turnout		4,049	46.82
Electors on the lists		8,648	–
Source: Elections Canada

== See also ==
- List of Newfoundland and Labrador provincial electoral districts
- Canadian provincial electoral districts
