= John Finn (politician) =

Canadian politician

John Finn MHA

Member of the Newfoundland and Labrador House of Assembly for Stephenville-Port au Port
- In office November 30, 2015 – April 17, 2019
- Preceded by: Riding Established
- Succeeded by: Tony Wakeham

Personal details
- Party: Liberal

John Finn is a Canadian politician, who represented Stephenville-Port au Port in the Newfoundland and Labrador House of Assembly from 2015 until 2019 as a member of the Liberal Party.

Finn was elected in the 2015 provincial election. He ran for re-election in the 2019 provincial election but was defeated.

Prior to entering provincial politics, Finn worked with the Community Education Network in Stephenville as an employment counsellor and a housing and homelessness caseworker. He was elected to town council in Stephenville in 2013 serving until his election to the provincial legislature.
