= Jeff Dwyer =

Canadian politician

Jeff Dwyer MHA

Member of the Newfoundland and Labrador House of Assembly for Placentia West-Bellevue
- Incumbent
- Assumed office May 16, 2019
- Preceded by: Mark Browne

Personal details
- Born: Marystown, Newfoundland and Labrador, Canada
- Party: Progressive Conservative

Jeffrey Thomas Paul Dwyer is a Canadian politician, who was elected to the Newfoundland and Labrador House of Assembly in the 2019 provincial election. He represents the electoral district of Placentia West-Bellevue as a member of the Newfoundland and Labrador Progressive Conservative Party. Dwyer was re-elected in the 2021 provincial election.

Dwyer was re-elected in the 2025 Newfoundland and Labrador general election.

On September 17, 2026, Dwyer voted to approve the Churchill Falls Definitive Cooperation and Implementation Agreement (DCIA) in the House of Assembly along with the PC caucus.

Dwyer served as Bowater House president at Memorial University of Newfoundland in 2000.

== Election results ==
2025 Newfoundland and Labrador general election: Placentia West-Bellevue
Party	Candidate	Votes	%	±%
Progressive Conservative	Jeff Dwyer	2,641	47.1%	-7.22
Liberal	Brian Keating	2,577	46.0%	+3.79
New Democratic	Jasmine Paul	388	6.9%	+3.44
Total valid votes				
Total rejected ballots				
Turnout				
Eligible voters				
Progressive Conservative hold		Swing		-

2021 Newfoundland and Labrador general election: Placentia West-Bellevue
Party	Candidate	Votes	%	±%
Progressive Conservative	Jeff Dwyer	2,965	54.32	-1.45
Liberal	Sam Synard	2,304	42.21	-2.02
New Democratic	Carolyn Davis	189	3.46	
Total valid votes		5,458	99.25	
Total rejected ballots		41	0.75	
Turnout		5,499	56.84	
Eligible voters		9,674		
Progressive Conservative hold		Swing		+0.28
Source(s) "Officially Nominated Candidates General Election 2021" (PDF). Elections Newfoundland and Labrador. "NL Election 2021 Report" (PDF).

2019 Newfoundland and Labrador general election
Party	Candidate	Votes	%	±%
Progressive Conservative	Jeff Dwyer	3,363	55.77	
Liberal	Mark Browne	2,667	44.23	
Total valid votes		6,030		
Total rejected ballots				
Turnout				
Eligible voters				
