= Sarah Stoodley =

Canadian politician

The Honourable Sarah Stoodley ECNL MHA
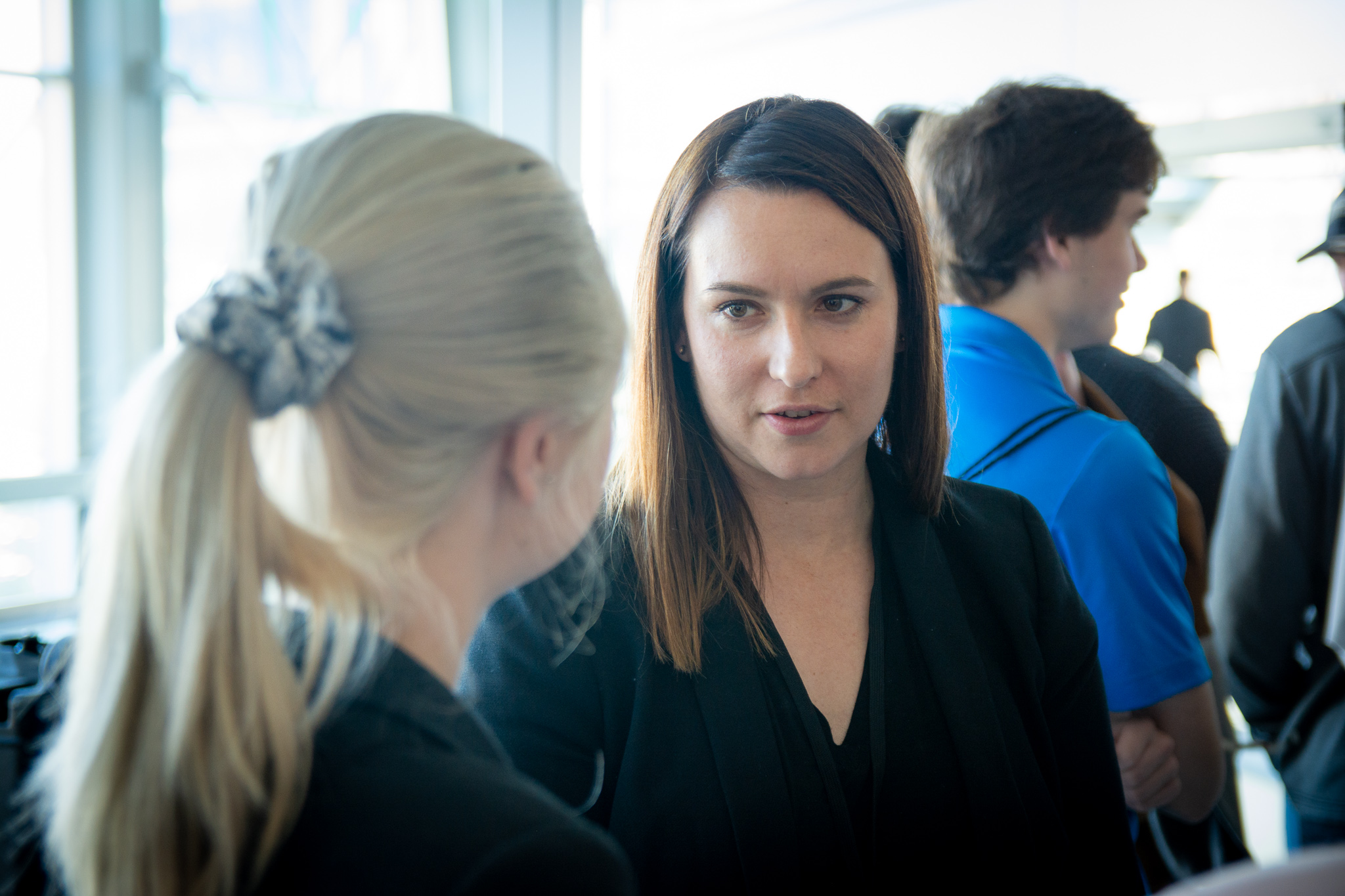

Acting Minister of Mental Health and Addictions and Minister of Housing
- In office March 11, 2025 – May 9, 2025
- Preceded by: John Abbott
- Succeeded by: John Abbott

Minister of Government Modernization and Service Delivery
- In office May 9, 2025 – October 29, 2025
- Preceded by: Elvis Loveless
- Succeeded by: Lin Paddock

Minister of Immigration, Population Growth, and Skills
- In office July 19, 2024 – May 9, 2025
- Preceded by: Gerry Byrne
- Succeeded by: Gerry Byrne

Member of the Newfoundland and Labrador House of Assembly for Mount Scio
- Incumbent
- Assumed office May 16, 2019
- Preceded by: Dale Kirby

Minister of Digital Government and Service NL
- In office August 19, 2020 – July 19, 2024
- Preceded by: Tom Osborne (acting)
- Succeeded by: Elvis Loveless

Personal details
- Party: Liberal
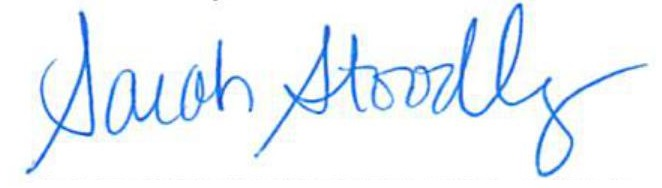
- Signature

Sarah Stoodley is a Canadian politician, who was elected to the Newfoundland and Labrador House of Assembly in the 2019 provincial election. She represents the electoral district of Mount Scio as a member of the Newfoundland and Labrador Liberal Party.

Prior to her election to the House of Assembly, Stoodley was an elected alumni representative on the Memorial University Board of Regents and a board member of the Pippy Park Commission.

== Political career ==
Stoodley was elected to the House of Assembly in the 2019 election and was one of only two Liberals (alongside Elvis Loveless) elected for the first time.

In June 2019, she was appointed Parliamentary Secretary to the Minister of Tourism, Culture, Industry and Innovation.

In March 2020, Stoodley introduced a private member's motion to the House of Assembly calling for the expansion of PIPEDA; the motion was passed.

=== Cabinet Minister ===
On August 19, 2020, Stoodley was appointed Minister of Digital Government and Service Newfoundland and Labrador, Minister Responsible for the Office of the Chief Information Officer, and Minister Responsible for Francophone Affairs in the Furey government.

She was re-elected in the 2021 provincial election.

On July 19, 2024, she was appointed as Minister of Immigration, Population Growth, and Skills and Minister Responsible for Francophone Affairs.

On March 11, 2025 she was appointed as Acting Minister of Mental Health and Addictions and Acting Minister of Housing, in addition to Minister of Immigration, Population Growth and Skills and Minister Responsible for Francophone Affairs.

On May 9, 2025 she was appointed Minister of Government Modernization and Service Delivery, and Minister Responsible for the Office of the Chief Information Officer, shortly after the election of new Premier John Hogan.

Stoodley was re-elected in the 2025 Newfoundland and Labrador general election.

== Personal life ==
Stoodley grew up in Grand Falls-Windsor and has lived in England. She obtained a Bachelor of Commerce and Master of Arts both from Memorial University of Newfoundland.

In August 2020, Stoodley announced that she was pregnant with her first child. In response to her pregnancy, the House of Assembly changed policy to allow parents to bring their babies with them into the legislative chambers.

== Electoral record ==
2025 Newfoundland and Labrador general election: Mount Scio
Party	Candidate	Votes	%	±%
Liberal	Sarah Stoodley	2,006	46.13	-0.47
Progressive Conservative	Darrell Hynes	1,551	35.66	+8.96
New Democratic	Laurabel Mba	792	18.21	-6.68
Total valid votes		4,349	99.8	
Total rejected ballots		8	0.18	
Turnout		4,357	41.47	
Eligible voters		10,507		
Liberal hold		Swing		-4.73%

2021 Newfoundland and Labrador general election: Mount Scio
Party	Candidate	Votes	%	±%
Liberal	Sarah Stoodley	2,011	46.60	+4.93
Progressive Conservative	Damian Follett	1,152	26.70	-10.52
New Democratic	Sheilagh O'Leary	1,074	24.89	+12.33
NL Alliance	Andrea Newbury	60	1.39	-7.15
Independent	Larry Borne	18	0.42	
Total valid votes		4,315		
Total rejected ballots				
Turnout				
Eligible voters				
Liberal hold		Swing		+7.72
Source(s) "Officially Nominated Candidates General Election 2021" (PDF). Elections Newfoundland and Labrador. "NL Election 2021 (Unofficial Results)".

2019 Newfoundland and Labrador general election
Party	Candidate	Votes	%	±%
Liberal	Sarah Stoodley	1,981	41.68	-5.41
Progressive Conservative	Lloyd Power	1,769	37.22	+9.84
New Democratic	Jason R. Mercer	597	12.56	-12.98
NL Alliance	Graydon Pelley	406	8.54	
Total valid votes		4,753	99.69	
Total rejected ballots		15	0.31	-0.08
Turnout		4,768	54.51	+7.69
Electors on the lists		8,747	–	
Liberal hold		Swing		-7.63
Source: Elections Canada
