= Lisa Dempster =

Canadian politician

The Honourable Lisa Dempster ECNL MHA

Opposition House Leader
- Incumbent
- Assumed office November 3, 2025
- Preceded by: Barry Petten

Minister of Environment and Climate Change, Minister Responsible for Labour, Minister Responsible for Workplace NL, and Deputy Government House Leader
- In office July 19, 2024 – May 9, 2025
- Premier: Andrew Furey
- Preceded by: Bernard Davis

Minister Responsible for the Status of Women
- In office August 19, 2020 – April 8, 2021
- Premier: Andrew Furey
- Preceded by: Carol Anne Haley
- Succeeded by: Pam Parsons

Minister Responsible for Indigenous Affairs and Reconciliation
- In office August 19, 2020 – July 19, 2024
- Premier: Andrew Furey
- Preceded by: position established
- Succeeded by: Scott Reid

Minister of Children, Seniors, and Social Development, Minister of Municipal affairs, Minister Responsible for the Multi-Materials Stewardship Board, Minister Responsible for the NL Housing Corporation, Minister Responsible for the Status of Persons with Disabilities, And Registrar General
- In office July 31, 2017 – August 19, 2020
- Premier: Dwight Ball
- Preceded by: Sherry Gambin-Walsh
- Succeeded by: Brian Warr

Member of the Newfoundland and Labrador House of Assembly for Cartwright-L'Anse au Clair
- Incumbent
- Assumed office July 18, 2013
- Preceded by: Yvonne Jones

Personal details
- Born: May 24, 1968 (age 58) Botwood
- Party: Liberal
- Spouse: Gaius Dempster

Lisa Velma Dempster (Nee Powell) (Born May 24, 1968) is a Canadian politician, who was elected to the Newfoundland and Labrador House of Assembly in a by-election on June 25, 2013. She represents the district of Cartwright-L'Anse au Clair as a member of the Liberal Party.

== Background ==
A resident of Charlottetown, Labrador, Dempster has worked as an employment counsellor and as a municipal Councillor in Charlottetown, including serving as the town's deputy mayor. Dempster is a member of NunatuKavut.

== Politics ==
Dempster was first elected in a 2013 by-election. After her re-election in the 2015 election, Dempster was named Deputy Speaker of the House of Assembly.

=== Cabinet Minister ===
Dempster was promoted to Minister of Children, Seniors, and Social Development in a cabinet shuffle on July 31, 2017.

She was re-elected in the 2019 provincial election.

On August 19, 2020, Dempster was appointed Minister Responsible for the Status of Women and Minister of Indigenous Affairs and Reconciliation, Minister of Labrador Affairs, and Deputy Government House Leader in the Furey government.

She was re-elected in the 2021 provincial election. On July 19, 2024, she was appointed as Minister of Environment and Climate Change, Minister of Labrador Affairs, Minister Responsible for Labour, Minister Responsible for Workplace NL, and Deputy Government House Leader. On May 9, 2025, she was appointed Minister of Fisheries, Forestry and Agriculture, Minister of Labrador Affairs, and Government House Leader.

Dempster was re-elected in the 2025 Newfoundland and Labrador general election.

== Electoral record ==
2025 Newfoundland and Labrador general election: Cartwright-L'Anse au Clair
Party	Candidate	Votes	%	±%
Liberal	Lisa Dempster	789	53.75	-41.46
Progressive Conservative	Nina Rumbolt-Pye	641	43.66	+38.87
New Democratic	Patricia Bailey	38	2.59	
Total valid votes		1,468		
Total rejected ballots				
Turnout				
Eligible voters				
Liberal hold		Swing		-40.16

2021 Newfoundland and Labrador general election
Party	Candidate	Votes	%	±%
Liberal	Lisa Dempster	973	95.21	+27.99
Progressive Conservative	Joshua Nolan	49	4.79	-27.99
Total valid votes		1,002	100	

2019 Newfoundland and Labrador general election
Party	Candidate	Votes	%	±%
Liberal	Lisa Dempster	1,132	67.22	-25.8
Progressive Conservative	Michael Normore	552	32.78	+29.6
Total valid votes		1,684	100	
Total rejected ballots		24		
Turnout		1,708	58.8	
Eligible voters		2,905		
Liberal hold		Swing		-27.71

2015 Newfoundland and Labrador general election
Party	Candidate	Votes	%	±%
Liberal	Lisa Dempster	1,405	93.05	+39.48
New Democratic	Jennifer Deon	57	3.77	-29.20
Progressive Conservative	Jason MacKenzie	48	3.18	-10.29
Total valid votes		1,510	100.00	
Liberal hold		Swing		+34.34

By-election, June 25, 2013 Resignation of Yvonne Jones
Party	Candidate	Votes	%	+/-
Liberal	Lisa Dempster	1,141	53.54	-17.60
NDP	Jason Spingle	703	32.99	+30.92
Progressive Conservative	Dennis Normore	287	13.47	-13.33
