= Newfoundland and Labrador Alliance =

Former political party in Canada

- Defunct provincial party
- Leader: Graydon Pelley
- President: Rudy Norman
- Founded: April 12, 2019
- Dissolved: March 30, 2023
- Split from: Newfoundland and Labrador PC Party
- Ideology: Populism
- Colours: Red, Blue, and Yellow

The Newfoundland and Labrador Alliance (NL Alliance) was a political party in the Canadian province of Newfoundland and Labrador. The party was created by former PC Party president Graydon Pelley in November 2018, following a split over the direction of the party. It was registered with Elections Newfoundland and Labrador in April 2019. In the 2019 and 2021 provincial elections the party failed to win any seats in the legislature. Pelley resigned from the party in 2023. The party was de-registered on March 30, 2023.

== History and principles ==
In November 2018, Graydon Pelley, then-president of the PC Party, resigned from the party, citing a lack of "real change that people want" among the new leadership. Pelley had run for the PCs in the Humber-Gros Morne district in the 2015 election, coming in a distant second to Premier Dwight Ball.

Pelley stated the NL Alliance's principles were focused on fixing a "broken" political system, offering five points to fix what he sees as ills. They include:

- Free votes in the House of Assembly
- Having meetings to promote consensus among parties
- Clean up behaviour in the House of Assembly
- Opposing political appointees in provincial government jobs
- Instituting recall legislation for MHAs

The NL Alliance held its first town hall meeting in January 2019 in the provincial capital of St. John's; there were roughly 20 people in attendance, including Independent MHA Paul Lane. At the meeting, party founder Pelley laid out his basic premise for starting the party, claiming that status quo politics in the province wasn't working for residents.

While Lane decided against joining the party and media gave little further attention, Pelley continued forward with his project, eventually gaining the necessary signatures to register the NL Alliance in time for the 2019 general election. During the election, Pelley was included in the Federation of Labour leaders debate and the NLTA candidates forum, but was excluded from other debates. Pelley personally contested the district of Mount Scio but finished a distant fourth. In 2020, Pelley contested the by-election in his home district of Humber-Gros Morne; he finished a distant third.

In the 2021 provincial election, the NL Alliance nominated six candidates. Party leader Graydon Pelley withdrew his nomination in Humber-Gros Morne following a medical emergency. After suspending his personal campaign, his candidacy did not appear on the ballot in the constituency. The party failed to win any seats in the election.

In February 2023, Pelley and party president Rudy Norman both announced their departure from the party that they had established. In an interview with CBC News, Pelley remarked that it was difficult to promote election reform within a rigid provincial party system. The party remained registered with Elections NL, and Pelley expressed a hope that somebody would volunteer to maintain it. However, the party was de-registered on March 30, 2023.

== Electoral history ==
Election results
Election year	No. of overall votes	% of overall total	No. of candidates who ran	No. of seats won	+/−	Government
2019	5,086	2.39	9 / 40	0 / 40	Steady	No seats
2021	557	0.31	5 / 40	0 / 40	Steady	No seats

Humber-Gros Morne - By-election, 6 October 2020 Resignation of Dwight Ball
Party	Candidate	Votes	%	±%
Liberal	Andrew Furey	3,401	63.95	-5.99
Progressive Conservative	Mike Goosney	1,332	25.05	-5.01
NL Alliance	Graydon Pelley	464	8.73	+8.73
New Democratic	Graham Downey-Sutton	121	2.28	+2.28
Total valid votes		5,318		
Liberal hold		Swing		-0.49
