= Pam Parsons =

Canadian politician

The Honourable Pam Parsons ECNL MHA

Member of the Newfoundland and Labrador House of Assembly for Harbour Grace-Port de Grave
- Incumbent
- Assumed office November 30, 2015
- Preceded by: Riding Established

Minister of Rural Economic Development, Minister of Labour, Minister Responsible for Workplace NL
- In office May 9, 2025 – October 14, 2025
- Premier: John Hogan
- Preceded by: Fred Hutton
- Succeeded by: Lin Paddock

Minister Responsible for Women and Gender Equality
- In office April 8, 2021 – May 9, 2025
- Premier: Andrew Furey
- Preceded by: Lisa Dempster
- Succeeded by: Sherry Gambin-Walsh

Personal details
- Party: Liberal
- Occupation: Journalist

Pamela Nora Parsons is a Canadian politician, who was elected to the Newfoundland and Labrador House of Assembly in the 2015 provincial election. She represents the electoral district of Harbour Grace-Port de Grave as a member of the Liberal Party.

== Background ==
Prior to her entry into politics, Parsons was a journalist reporting for CBC's Here and Now NL, CBC Radio NL, and Roger's TV St. John's, NL programme "Out of the Fog". She was the producer for First Local News, Roger's TV, in Owen Sound, Ontario. Parsons was also a Video Journalist for NTV News Newfoundland Broadcasting Co. She is a musician and performs at many charitable functions.

== Politics ==
Parsons was first elected in the 2015 provincial election.

In a special August 2017 sitting of the House of Assembly, Parsons ran for Speaker of the Assembly; she was defeated by fellow Liberal Perry Trimper. In 2018, Parsons gained notable attention for her role in the House of Assembly harassment scandal; specifically for filing a complaint against then-Cabinet Minister Dale Kirby.

Parsons was re-elected in the 2019 and 2021 provincial elections. On April 8, 2021, she was appointed Minister Responsible for Women and Gender Equality. On May 9, 2025, she was appointed Minister of Rural Economic Development, Minister of Labour, and Minister Responsible for Workplace.

Parsons was re-elected in the 2025 Newfoundland and Labrador general election.

== Electoral history ==
2025 Newfoundland and Labrador general election: Harbour Grace-Port de Grave
Party	Candidate	Votes	%	±%
Liberal	Pam Parsons	3,750	59.20	-11.89
Progressive Conservative	Walter Yetman	2,241	35.38	+10.97
Independent	Alison Coffin	233	3.68	
New Democratic	Darian Vincent	110	1.74	-2.75
Total valid votes		6,334		
Total rejected ballots				
Turnout				
Eligible voters				
Liberal hold		Swing		-11.43

2021 Newfoundland and Labrador general election: Harbour Grace-Port de Grave
Party	Candidate	Votes	%	±%
Liberal	Pam Parsons	3,404	71.09	+18.65
Progressive Conservative	Roy Sparkes	1,169	24.42	-23.14
New Democratic	Dion Hynes	215	4.49	
Total valid votes		4,788	99.65	
Total rejected ballots		17	0.35	
Turnout		4,805	44.35	
Eligible voters		10,835		
Liberal hold		Swing		+20.90
Source: Elections Newfoundland and Labrador

2019 Newfoundland and Labrador general election
Party	Candidate	Votes	%	±%
Liberal	Pam Parsons	3,758	52.4	-9.2
Progressive Conservative	Glenn Littlejohn	3,408	47.6	+11.3
Total valid votes		7,166	100	
Total rejected ballots		72		
Turnout		7,238	71.2	+11.7
Eligible voters		10,168		

2015 Newfoundland and Labrador general election
Party	Candidate	Votes	%
Liberal	Pam Parsons	3,877	61.55
Progressive Conservative	Glenn Littlejohn	2,289	36.34
New Democratic	Kathleen Burt	133	2.11
Total valid votes		6,299	99.62
Total rejected ballots		24	0.38
Turnout		6,323	59.51
Eligible voters		10,625	
Source: Elections Newfoundland and Labrador
