= Carol Anne Haley =

Canadian politician

The Honourable Carol Anne Haley ECNL
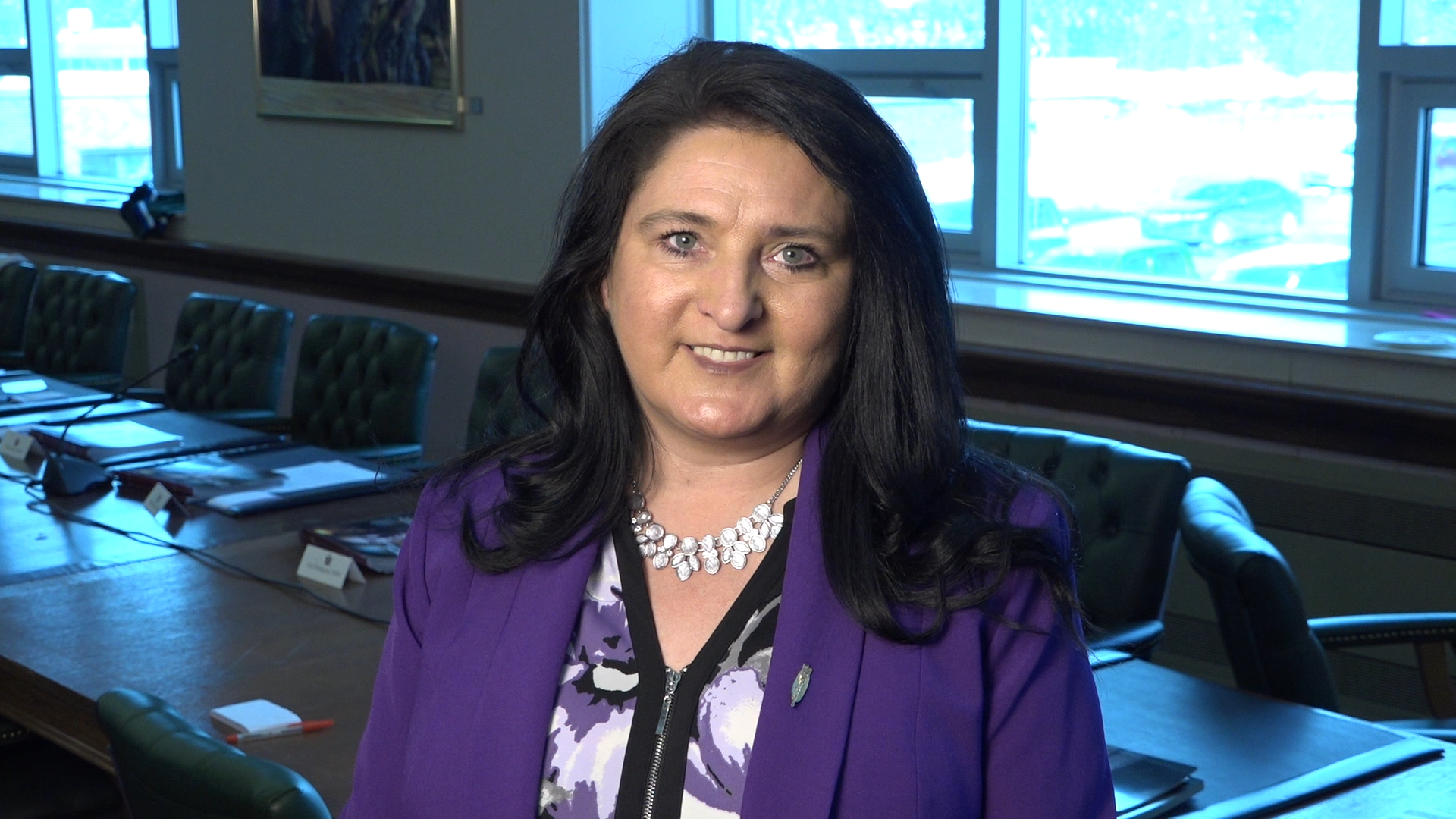

Member of the Newfoundland and Labrador House of Assembly for Burin-Grand Bank
- In office November 30, 2015 – January 15, 2021
- Preceded by: Riding Established
- Succeeded by: Paul Pike

Minister Responsible for the Status of Women
- In office November 8, 2018 – August 19, 2020
- Preceded by: Siobhan Coady
- Succeeded by: Lisa Dempster

Personal details
- Born: January 27, 1972 (age 54) Grand Bank, Newfoundland and Labrador
- Party: Liberal

Carol Anne Haley (born 27 January 1972) is a Canadian politician, who represented the district of Burin-Grand Bank in the Newfoundland and Labrador House of Assembly from 2015 until 2021.

Haley was elected in the 2015 provincial election. She served as chief government whip in the House of Assembly.

On November 8, 2018, Haley was promoted to cabinet as Minister Responsible for the Status of Women.

She was re-elected in the 2019 provincial election defeating former MHA and MP Bill Matthews.

On August 14, 2020 Haley announced she would not be seeking re-election and would resign as Status of Women Minister when the incoming Furey government was sworn in on August 19, 2020.

Prior to her election to the legislature, Haley was a special assistant to federal Member of Parliament Judy Foote.

Newfoundland and Labrador provincial government of Dwight Ball
Cabinet post (1)
| Predecessor | Office | Successor |
|---|---|---|
| Siobhan Coady | Minister Responsible for the Status of Women; November 8, 2018– August 19, 2020 | Lisa Dempster |
