= New Democratic Party of Newfoundland and Labrador leadership elections =

This page lists the results of the leadership elections held by the New Democratic Party of Newfoundland and Labrador. The provincial New Democratic Party was established in 1961 alongside the federal New Democratic Party.

== 1966 leadership convention ==
The 1966 leadership convention was held from August 20–23, 1966. Although the party contested the 1962 provincial election under the leadership of Ed Finn, it was not formally organized and did not have a constitution. Thus, the convention sought to organize the party itself alongside its platform for the upcoming 1966 election.

About 20 delegates gathered at the Newfoundland Federation of Labour headquarters in St. John's to elect a leader and party executive. Labour leader Calvin Normore of Corner Brook, who had been the co-founder of the Newfoundland Democratic Party, won the election by acclamation on August 22, 1966. The convention concluded with a rally at Pitt's Memorial Hall headlined by guest speaker and federal NDP leader Tommy Douglas.

== 1970 leadership convention ==
The 1970 leadership convention was held from September 10–13, 1970. Normore had resigned in 1968 and the party was left without a formal leader. Two candidates declared themselves for the party's nomination, namely:

- John Connors, school teacher in Grand Falls and federal candidate for St. John's West in 1968
- Calvin Hillyard, Salvation Army officer of Corner Brook

In a convention held at the Newfoundland Hotel in St. John's, Connors won what would be the party's first contested nominations. The guest speakers included Ontario politician Jim Renwick and Saskatchewan opposition leader Allan Blakeney. No results were made public by the party, but Renwick told the press that it was a close contest.

	Results	
Candidate	Votes	%
John Connors	N/A	
Calvin Hillyard	N/A	
Totals	51	100%

== 1974 leadership convention ==
The 1974 leadership convention was held on September 28, 1974. Connors chose not to run again as he felt that he was unable to take the party into an impending provincial election while completing his postgraduate studies in English at Memorial University. Two leadership candidates emerged:

- Gerry Panting, Memorial University history professor
- Edgar Russell, candidate for Port de Grave in 1971

The nomination vote, held at the Holiday Inn in St. John's, saw an overwhelming victory for Panting.

	Results	
Candidate	Votes	%
Gerry Panting	27	93.10%
Edgar Russell	2	6.90%
Totals	29	100%

== 1977 leadership convention ==
The 1977 leadership convention was held on May 29, 1977. Panting had resigned to resume his work at Memorial University. School teacher John Greene of Fogo won the election by acclamation at a convention held in St. John's.

== 1980 leadership convention ==
The 1980 leadership convention was held on November 9–10, 1980 following Greene's resignation. Fonse Faour, a lawyer and former Member of Parliament (MP) for Humber—St. George's—St. Barbe, won the election by acclamation at a convention held in his home town of Corner Brook. National party leader Ed Broadbent was the headlining speaker.

== 1981 leadership convention ==
The 1981 leadership convention was held on November 8–9, 1981. Faour had resigned less than a year after taking office due to the difficulties he faced in simultaneously managing the party and his own legal practice. Several candidates expressed interest for the nomination, including lawyer Bryan Blackmore, teacher Peter Fenwick, businessman Mike Maher and former Newfoundland Federation of Labour president Tom Mayo. However, only Fenwick ultimately declared his candidacy, and he won the election by acclamation at a convention in St. John's.

== 1989 leadership convention ==
The 1989 leadership convention was held on March 18, 1989 after Fenwick announced his resignation. It followed an eight week-long campaign in what was the first formal leadership race for the provincial party, which had seen its best electoral performance yet in the 1985 provincial election. There were two candidates:

- Gene Long, MHA for St. John's East since 1986
- Cle Newhook, Memorial University student services co-ordinator and director of the Ocean Ranger Families Foundation

The convention was held in St. John's and saw an attendance of 370 people. Newhook narrowly defeated Long in a close leadership vote.

	Results	
Candidate	Votes	%
Cle Newhook	126	54.31%
Gene Long	105	45.26%
Spoiled ballots	1	0.43%
Totals	232	100%

== 1992 leadership convention ==
The 1992 leadership convention was held on November 14–15, 1992 after Newhook announced his resignation following three unsuccessful candidacies to the House of Assembly. Jack Harris, the MHA for St. John's East, ran unopposed, and he was elected by acclamation at a leadership vote held in St. John's. Harris was the first leader of the provincial NDP to have been nominated while serving as an elected official.

== 2006 leadership convention ==
The 2006 leadership convention was held from May 26–28, 2006 after Harris announced his resignation. Once again, only two candidates ran:

- Lorraine Michael, high school teacher and former nun
- Nina Patey, writer

The convention was held in St. John's, where Michael won by an overwhelming majority of the votes. She became the provincial party's first female leader.

	Results	
Candidate	Votes	%
Lorraine Michael	107	95.54%
Nina Patey	5	4.46%
Totals	112	100%

== 2015 leadership convention ==
The 2015 leadership convention was held on March 7, 2015. The party had achieved its best ever electoral result in the 2011 provincial election, electing five candidates and receiving 25% of the popular vote. As the Liberal party began to overtake them in subsequent polling, the caucus signed a collective letter demanding new leadership. Two of the party's newly-elected MHAs, Dale Kirby and Christopher Mitchelmore, would leave the party before joining the Liberal caucus.

After the party performed poorly in several 2014 by-elections, Michael eventually agreed to step down as leader upon the election of her successor. Three candidates competed to take her place:

- Chris Bruce, a barista and former party executive who had left amidst the caucus revolt
- Mike Goosney, former Labrador City town councillor
- Earle McCurdy, former president of the Fish, Food and Allied Workers Union

McCurdy's victory was announced at a convention held in St. John's.

	Results	
Candidate	Votes	%
Earle McCurdy	889	68.49%
Mike Goosney	299	23.04%
Chris Bruce	110	8.47%
Totals	1,298	100%

== 2018 leadership convention ==
The 2018 leadership convention was held from April 6–8, 2018. McCurdy had failed to win a seat in the 2015 election, and he eventually announced his resignation in September 2017 with Michael named the interim leader. Two candidates declared themselves for the nomination:

- Alison Coffin, Memorial University economics professor
- Gerry Rogers, MHA for St. John's Centre since 2011

The convention was held in St. John's, and federal NDP leader Jagmeet Singh was the keynote speaker. Rogers won by roughly two-thirds of the vote.

	Results	
Candidate	Votes	%
Gerry Rogers	971	66.97%
Alison Coffin	479	33.03%
Totals	1,450	100%

== 2019 leadership nomination ==
The 2019 leadership election was set to be held from March 13–16, 2019. Rogers had resigned about ten months after her election in February 2019. Only one candidate, Alison Coffin, offered herself for nomination, and her victory by acclamation was announced at a leadership conference on March 5, 2019.

== 2023 leadership nomination ==
The 2023 leadership election was set to be held in the fall of 2023. Coffin had resigned in October 2021 after a majority of party delegates voted for a leadership convention following her electoral defeat in that year's provincial election. Jim Dinn, the MHA for St. John's Centre, had been named the interim leader in Coffin's place. Although he initially expressed no interest in taking on the leadership role on a permanent basis, he relented and announced his candidacy after much encouragement from his family and fellow party members. Nominations were held in February 2023, and Dinn's victory by acclamation was announced on March 28, 2023.

== See also ==
- Liberal Party of Newfoundland and Labrador leadership elections
- Progressive Conservative Party of Newfoundland and Labrador leadership elections
