= 2019 New Democratic Party of Newfoundland and Labrador leadership election =

- Date: March 13–16, 2019 (planned voting period)
- Resigning leader: Gerry Rogers
- Won by: Alison Coffin
- Ballots: 0
- Candidates: 1
- Entrance fee: $1,000

The 2019 New Democratic Party of Newfoundland and Labrador leadership election was prompted by Gerry Rogers' announcement on February 12, 2019, that she would be resigning from politics. Economist Alison Coffin, who was the only declared candidate, won by acclamation on March 1, 2019. She was confirmed as the party's new leader at a news conference on March 5, 2019.

== Timeline ==
- April 6–8, 2018 - MHA Gerry Rogers is nominated in a leadership convention in St. John's, defeating Alison Coffin.
- February 12, 2019 - Rogers announces her resignation as party leader, effective upon the election of a new leader. Party president Lynn Moore states that the details on the convention would be released the following day. Fellow NDP MHA Lorraine Michael announces she will not be a candidate.
- February 13, 2019 - Alison Coffin declares her candidacy, lawyer Mark Gruchy states he is "seriously giving thought" about running, and Sheilagh O'Leary confirms that she will not be a candidate.
- February 14, 2019 - The New Democratic Party releases the rules and deadlines for their leadership contest.
- March 1, 2019 - Deadline for candidates to be nominated.
- March 5, 2019 - The New Democratic Party holds a leadership conference confirming Coffin as the party's new leader.
- March 10, 2019 - Planned deadline for members to register for the election.
- March 13–16, 2019 - Planned voting that would have been held through email and telephone.

== Declared candidates ==
=== Alison Coffin ===
Memorial University economics professor, 2018 leadership candidate for the New Democrats, 2015 candidate in Waterford Valley

Date campaign launched: February 13, 2019

Other prominent supporters: Mark Gruchy, lawyer, 2015 candidate in Cape St. Francis; Kerri Neil, 2018 candidate in Windsor Lake by-election

== Declined to run ==
- Jim Dinn, former president of the Newfoundland and Labrador Teachers' Association
- Mark Gruchy, lawyer, 2015 candidate in Cape St. Francis (endorsed Alison Coffin)
- Lorraine Michael, former MHA for St. John's East-Quidi Vidi (2006–2019), former Leader of the New Democratic Party of Newfoundland and Labrador (2006–2015), former interim Leader of the New Democratic Party of Newfoundland and Labrador (2017–2018)
- Sheilagh O'Leary, deputy mayor of St. John's (2017–2025), 2014 candidate in Virginia Waters

== See also ==
- New Democratic Party of Newfoundland and Labrador
- 1989 New Democratic Party of Newfoundland and Labrador leadership election
- 2006 New Democratic Party of Newfoundland and Labrador leadership election
- 2015 New Democratic Party of Newfoundland and Labrador leadership election
- 2018 New Democratic Party of Newfoundland and Labrador leadership election
- Next New Democratic Party of Newfoundland and Labrador leadership election
