= 2018 New Democratic Party of Newfoundland and Labrador leadership election =

- April 6–8, 2018
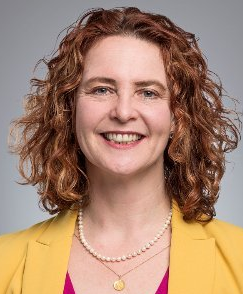
	GR
Candidate	Gerry Rogers	Alison Coffin
Results	971 (66.97%)	479 (33.03%)
Leader before election
Lorraine Michael (interim)
Leader after election
Gerry Rogers

2018 New Democratic Party of Newfoundland and Labrador leadership election
- Date: April 6–8, 2018
- Convention: St. John's
- Resigning leader: Earle McCurdy
- Won by: Gerry Rogers
- Ballots: 1
- Candidates: 2
- Entrance fee: $2,000
- Spending limit: $25,000

The 2018 New Democratic Party of Newfoundland and Labrador leadership election was held in St. John's in April 2018 to nominate the successor of New Democratic Party of Newfoundland and Labrador leader Earle McCurdy, who resigned as head of the party effective September 30, 2017. Former leader Lorraine Michael was appointed interim leader before the convention. The deadline to register as a candidate was February 28, 2018. The deadline to become a party member to vote in the election was March 9, 2018. Federal NDP leader Jagmeet Singh delivered the keynote address. St. John's Centre MHA Gerry Rogers won the nomination on the first ballot. Rogers therefore became the first openly LGBT person to lead a political party in Newfoundland and Labrador.

== Timeline ==
- November 30, 2015 - Provincial election is held. The NDP wins two seats but party leader Earle McCurdy fails to win his seat of St. John's West.
- June 11, 2016 - At the party's provincial convention, McCurdy's leadership is affirmed with the support of 91.6% of delegates.
- September 19, 2017 - Earle McCurdy announces his resignation as party leader, effective at the end of the month. MHA Gerry Rogers announces her intention to seek the leadership. Her fellow NDP MHA, former leader Lorraine Michael announces she will not be a candidate.
- September 28, 2017 - The provincial executive names MHA Lorraine Michael as interim leader.
- January 10, 2018: Party executive announces the rules governing the leadership election and appoint lawyer Lynn Moore as Chief Electoral Officer of the election.
- February 12, 2018: Rogers announces her candidacy.
- February 15, 2018: Coffin announces her candidacy.
- February 28, 2018: Deadline for candidates to be nominated.
- March 9, 2018: Membership deadline.
- March 25, 2018: Leadership debate held in the Bruneau Centre at Memorial University.
- April 6–8, 2018: Leadership convention in St. John's.

== Debate ==
- The Leadership Candidate debate took place Sunday, March 25, 2:00-3:30 p.m. at the main lecture theatre of the Bruneau Centre, Memorial University St. John's campus. The debate was hosted by the NL NDP and NDP MUN. Former Radio Canada/CBC Reporter, Françoise Enguehard, moderated.

== Rules ==
Leadership candidates must have been NL NDP members in good standing, as defined by Article 4 of the Constitution of the Party, and had to have meet the following requirements:

- Complete and file registration papers with the CEO duly signed by 20 NL NDP members in good standing from a minimum of five electoral districts. Gender parity is required for these signatories.
- Complete and file a Candidate Disclosure Statement with the CEO.
- Pay a non-refundable registration fee of $2,000 at time of registration as a leadership candidate. The deadline for registration in order to appear on the leadership contest ballot was 5:00 p.m. NL time February 28, 2018.
- The NL NDP would organize one mandatory leadership debate for officially registered candidates.
- All those who are party members by March 7, 2018 were eligible to cast a ballot in the leadership contest. All memberships valid on the cut-off date will receive voting credentials.
- Voting would be one-member, one-vote ballot and available online, by telephone, and in person.

== Declared candidates ==
=== Alison Coffin ===
Memorial University economics professor, 2015 candidate in Waterford Valley

Date campaign launched: February 15, 2018

Supporters
Other prominent supporters: Devon Babstock, 2015 federal NDP candidate, Long Range Mountains; Chris Bruce, former NDP Executive member and 2015 leadership candidate; Jean Graham, former NDP Caucus Office Director of Communications

=== Gerry Rogers ===
MHA for St. John's Centre (2011–2019), documentary filmmaker, social worker

Date campaign launched: September 19, 2017

Supporters
Other prominent supporters: Michael Walsh, former Chair of the Canadian Federation of Students - NL; Bonnie James, NDP Executive Member; Sobia Shaikh, MUN professor of Social Work

== Rejected candidates ==
- Wayne Ronald Bennett, Mayor of Howley, former Newfoundland and Labrador First Party leader (2008-2011), former Progressive Conservative Party of Newfoundland and Labrador leadership candidate

== Declined to run ==
- Chris Bruce, 2015 leadership candidate, former member of NDP executive.
- Lorraine Michael, MHA for St. John's East-Quidi Vidi (2006–2019), former Leader of the New Democratic Party of Newfoundland and Labrador (2006-2015)

== Results ==
	First Ballot	
Candidate	Votes	Perc.
Gerry Rogers	971	67.0%
Alison Coffin	479	33.0%
Spoiled Ballots	0	0.0%
Totals	1450	100%

== See also ==
- New Democratic Party of Newfoundland and Labrador
- 1989 New Democratic Party of Newfoundland and Labrador leadership election
- 2006 New Democratic Party of Newfoundland and Labrador leadership election
- 2015 New Democratic Party of Newfoundland and Labrador leadership election
