= 2015 New Democratic Party of Newfoundland and Labrador leadership election =

Election in Canada

- March 7, 2015
	EM	MG	CB
Candidate	Earle McCurdy	Mike Goosney	Chris Bruce
Results	889 (68.49%)	299 (23.04%)	110 (8.47%)
Leader before election
Lorraine Michael
Leader after election
Earle McCurdy

2015 New Democratic Party of Newfoundland and Labrador leadership election
- Date: March 7, 2015
- Convention: Sheraton Hotel, St. John's, Newfoundland and Labrador
- Resigning leader: Lorraine Michael
- Won by: Earle McCurdy
- Ballots: 1
- Candidates: 3
- Entrance fee: $1,000
- Spending limit: $25,000

The 2015 New Democratic Party of Newfoundland and Labrador leadership election was held March 7, 2015 in St. John's. The election was prompted by Lorraine Michael's announcement on January 6, 2015, that she would step down as leader of the party after a successor was chosen. All NDP members were able to cast ballots by phone or online between February 25 and March 5, 2015, or in person at the party's convention on March 7, 2015. Earle McCurdy was elected with 68% support on the first ballot.

== Timeline ==
- October 11, 2011 - In the provincial election NDP wins 5 seats with just under 25% of the popular vote, its best ever result.
- October 21, 2013 - Michael announces she had received a letter from her caucus over the previous weekend calling for a leadership election to be held in 2014. The caucus felt that without renewal in the party they would have trouble attracting quality candidates and public support in the 2015 election.
- October 29, 2013 - MHAs Dale Kirby (St. John's North) and Christopher Mitchelmore (The Straits – White Bay North) leave the NDP caucus over their dispute with Michael to sit as Independents. Both subsequently join the Liberals.
- May 17, 2014 - Michael passes a leadership review at the NDP convention with 75% support.
- November 5, 2014 - Conception Bay South by-election, NDP candidate receives 3.05% of the vote, down from 24.06% in the general election.
- November 25, 2014 - By-elections in Trinity-Bay de Verde and Humber East, NDP receives 5.41% and 7.81% of the vote respectively, down from 14.16% and 13.28% in the general election.
- January 6, 2015 - Michael announces that she is stepping down as party leader after the party's poor by-election results. Will remain leader until a leadership election can be held.
- February 6, 2015 at 5 pm - Deadline for candidates to be nominated.
- February 25, 2015 - Online and telephone voting begins.
- March 5, 2015 - Online and telephone voting ends.
- March 7, 2015 - In person voting by delegates at the NDP convention in St. John's. Ballots counted and a leader declared.

== Declared candidates ==
Chris Bruce

Bruce is a former NDP executive member who quit the executive following the 2013 caucus revolt against Lorraine Michael's leadership. He works as a barista. Advocates electoral finance reform which would include banning corporate and union donations to political parties; supports pharmacare, and increasing taxes on incomes above $70,000.

Mike Goosney

Goosney steelworker, former Labrador City town councillor. Advocates giving people more of a voice in politics and emphasizes health care, particularly improving service in rural areas.

Earle McCurdy

McCurdy is former president of the Fish, Food and Allied Workers Union (1993-2014). Endorsed by NDP MP Ryan Cleary and MHA Gerry Rogers. Advocates solutions to the province's fiscal situation and correcting the "democratic deficit" in government.

== Declined ==
- Bob Buckingham, St. John's lawyer.
- Ryan Cleary, NDP federal Member of Parliament for St. John's South—Mount Pearl.
- George Murphy, NDP MHA for St. John's East.
- Sheilagh O'Leary, former St. John's city councillor, NDP by-election candidate in Virginia Waters (2014).
- Lana Payne, Atlantic director for Unifor and NDP organizer.
- Gerry Rogers, NDP MHA for St. John's Centre.

== Results ==
	First Ballot	
Candidate	Votes	Perc.
Earle McCurdy	889	68.49%
Mike Goosney	299	23.04%
Chris Bruce	110	8.47%
Spoiled Ballots	0	0.00%
Totals	1,298	100%

== See also ==
- New Democratic Party of Newfoundland and Labrador
- 1989 New Democratic Party of Newfoundland and Labrador leadership election
- 2006 New Democratic Party of Newfoundland and Labrador leadership election
- 2023 New Democratic Party of Newfoundland and Labrador leadership election
