= 2023 New Democratic Party of Newfoundland and Labrador leadership election =

New Democratic Party provincial leadership election

- Resigning leader: Alison Coffin
- Won by: Jim Dinn
- Ballots: acclamation

The 2023 New Democratic Party of Newfoundland and Labrador leadership election was prompted by the departure of Alison Coffin, who resigned after the provincial New Democratic Party voted to hold a leadership review. On March 28, 2023, interim leader Jim Dinn was acclaimed leader after no other candidates entered.

== Timeline ==
- March 27, 2021 – The preliminary results of the provincial election are announced, where Premier Andrew Furey is re-elected with a slim majority. Alison Coffin, the party's leader, narrowly loses her seat in St. John's East-Quidi Vidi to Liberal candidate John Abbott.
- March 28, 2021 – Coffin announces that she has no intention to resign as leader of her party after her electoral defeat.
- April 1, 2021 – Coffin requests a recount in her home district.
- May 12, 2021 – Supreme Court Justice Donald Burrage rejects Coffin's bid for a recount, arguing that there was not sufficient evidence. Coffin remains as the party's leader.
- October 16, 2021 – The party's provincial convention is held, with the majority of delegates voting in favour of a leadership review. Coffin states that she will remain as party leader even if a formal leadership race is called.
- October 19, 2021 – Coffin reverses her initial decision and resigns as party leader. MHA Jim Dinn is named as the party's interim leader. Party president Kyle Rees suggests that the party may wait "up to a year" before opening up nominations.
- January 1, 2023 – Interim leader Dinn suggests that the provincial NDP will be holding a leadership convention in the fall of 2023. He also states that he does not intend on becoming a candidate.
- January 14, 2023 – In an interview with CBC News, Dinn says that he is considering running as the permanent leader of the provincial NDP following much encouragement from the party and his family.
- February 15, 2023 – The party opens up candidate nominations.
- February 16, 2023 – Dinn officially announces his candidacy.
- March 27, 2023 – Candidate nominations were closed.
- March 28, 2023 – Dinn was acclaimed leader after no other candidates entered.

== Declared candidates ==
=== Jim Dinn ===
Interim leader of the New Democrats (2021–present), MHA for St. John's Centre (2019–present), President of the Newfoundland and Labrador Teachers’ Association (NLTA) (2013–2017)

Date campaign launched: February 16, 2023

Supporters
MHAs: Jordan Brown, MHA for Labrador West; Lela Evans, MHA for Torngat Mountains
Former MHAs: Gerry Rogers, leader of the NDP (2018-2019), MHA for St. John's Centre (2011-2019)

== Declined to run ==
- Chris Bruce, 2015 leadership candidate, former member of NDP executive, farmer.
- Mark Gruchy, lawyer, 2015 candidate in Cape St. Francis.
- Sheilagh O'Leary, deputy Mayor of St. John's (2017–2025), NDP by-election candidate in Virginia Waters (2014) and candidate in Mount Scio (2021).
- Lana Payne, current President of Unifor, former Atlantic Director for Unifor and NDP organizer.
- Mansoor Pirzada, NDP 2021 federal election nomination candidate in St. John's East, current president of the Muslim Association of Newfoundland and Labrador.
