= Calvin Normore (politician) =

Canadian politician (1917–2002)

Leader of the Newfoundland and Labrador New Democratic Party
- In office 1963–1966
- Preceded by: Ed Finn
- Succeeded by: Esau Thoms

Personal details
- Born: Calvin George Normore; June 22, 1917
- Died: August 8, 2002 (aged 85)
- Other political affiliations: Newfoundland Democratic Party (1959-1961)
- Profession: machinist

Calvin George Normore (June 22, 1917 – August 8, 2002) was a Canadian politician, who served as leader of the Newfoundland and Labrador New Democratic Party from 1963 to 1966.

A machinist employed by Bowater at Corner Brook, he was an active labour unionist who served as president of the Corner Brook District Labor Council, and vice-president of the Newfoundland Federation of Labour. He was first politically active as a candidate for the Newfoundland Democratic Party, a shortlived provincial labour political party, in the 1959 provincial election. Following the creation of the national New Democratic Party in 1961, the Newfoundland Democratic Party merged with the NDP, which continued to be led by Ed Finn.

After the party failed to break through in the 1962 provincial election, Normore succeeded Finn as party leader, leading the party into the 1966 provincial election. Normore ran against premier Joey Smallwood in the electoral district of Humber West; while he garnered 34 per cent of the vote, he was not elected. He stepped down as leader, and Esau Thoms served as the party's interim leader until John Connors was selected at a leadership convention in 1970.

His son, Calvin Normore, is a noted academic.
