= Ryan Cleary =

Canadian politician (born 1966)

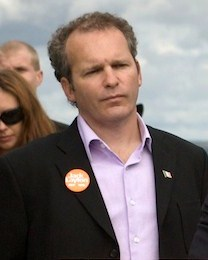

Member of Parliament for St. John's South—Mount Pearl
- In office May 2, 2011 – August 4, 2015
- Preceded by: Siobhán Coady
- Succeeded by: Seamus O'Regan

Personal details
- Born: November 20, 1966 (age 59) Gander, Newfoundland and Labrador, Canada
- Party: New Democratic Party (2008-2015); Progressive Conservative Party (2015)
- Education: College of the North Atlantic (Stephenville)
- Website: Fisherman's Road

Ronald E. "Ryan" Cleary (born November 20, 1966) is a Canadian politician and journalist from Newfoundland and Labrador, Canada. He was the Member of Parliament for St. John's South—Mount Pearl from 2011 to 2015.

Born in Gander and raised in Riverhead, Harbour Grace, and Bay Roberts, Cleary graduated from the journalism program at the Stephenville campus of the College of the North Atlantic in 1989. On May 2, 2011, Cleary was elected to the House of Commons as a member of the New Democratic Party in the 2011 election. He was defeated in the 2015 Canadian federal election, after which he switched parties to run as a Progressive Conservative in the 2015 Newfoundland and Labrador provincial election and was defeated in Windsor Lake. He was president of the Federation of Independent Seafood Harvesters (FISH-NL) from its founding to its dissolution.

== Journalism ==
As a journalist, Cleary covered most of the major events in Newfoundland and Labrador over the past two decades. He was fisheries reporter for The Telegram in 1992 when the moratorium was first introduced on northern cod. He also worked as a political and investigative reporter.

Cleary was the editor-in-chief of The Independent newspaper and was known for his outspoken and controversial articles. For example, Cleary claimed in his columns that Quebec had too much power in Canadian government institutions and said that Canada's top two problems were Quebec and Quebec. Cleary also earned a reputation as a steadfast Newfoundland separatist, such as in May 2008, when he wrote "I don't want to seem ungrateful, but now that we're rolling in the cash it may be time to consider breaking away from the country of Canada." When The Independent went out of business he went on to host Nightline, a VOCM radio call in program. Cleary also worked for The Newfoundland Herald and NTV.

== Federal politics ==
Cleary first entered politics when he became the New Democratic Party (NDP) candidate in the riding of St. John's South—Mount Pearl in the October 2008 federal election. His candidacy led to some controversy for him and NDP leader Jack Layton for comments Cleary had written only a couple of years before when he was a journalist. Cleary had referred to NDP supporters as a "small pocket of aging granolas and artsy-fartsies" and that they were "a mainstream party that wouldn't win an election if Jackie Layton was given a 100-seat head start." Despite his late entrance into the campaign and his previous comments he still managed to place a strong second in the riding.

On September 17, 2009, the New Democrats nominated Cleary as their candidate in St. John's South-Mount Pearl for the next federal election. In October 2010, Cleary announced that he would withdraw his candidacy. He stated that being a political candidate had created a conflict with his journalism work and that he wished to continue with his journalism career. He also noted that he had severed all ties with the NDP. However, in March 2011 with the announcement of a federal election, Cleary said he would return to run for the NDP again. On May 2, Cleary defeated Liberal Siobhán Coady receiving 18,332 votes to Coady's 10,670.

After Lorraine Michael stepped down as the leader of the Newfoundland and Labrador New Democratic Party in early 2015, Cleary publicly mused running for the party's leadership in the 2015 leadership election, but ultimately decided to not seek the position.

In the 2015 federal election, Cleary was defeated by Liberal Seamus O'Regan. On election night, NDP leader Tom Mulcair called Cleary his "political hero". He also supports ending the NDP's association with trade unions.

== Provincial politics ==
After his defeat in the 2015 federal election, Cleary entered talks with the Progressive Conservative Party of Newfoundland and Labrador to run under their banner in the 2015 Newfoundland and Labrador general election. On October 30, Cleary announced that he would seek the party's nomination in the electoral district of Windsor Lake. He won the Progressive Conservative nomination but was defeated in the general election by Liberal incumbent Cathy Bennett.

== Union activism ==
In 2016, Cleary started efforts to organize a new union of fish harvesters, to be called the Federation of Independent Seafood Harvesters, or FISH-NL, as a rival to the Fish, Food and Allied Workers union. Cleary travelled throughout the province signing up members for union certification, their application for union recognition was considered by the Labour Relations Board from 2016 to 2018. On September 28, 2018, the Labour Relations Board ruled that FISH-NL did not have enough support to trigger a ratification vote. On December 3, 2019, Cleary announced the dissolution of FISH-NL after it failed to gain the necessary 4,000 signatures after a second membership drive to trigger a ratification vote.

== Electoral history ==
=== Provincial ===
2015 Newfoundland and Labrador general election: Windsor Lake
Party	Candidate	Votes	%
Liberal	Cathy Bennett	3,182	66.40
Progressive Conservative	Ryan Cleary	970	20.24
New Democratic	Don Rowe	640	13.36
Total valid votes		4,792	100.0
Turnout		52.59	
Eligible voters		9,088	

=== Federal ===
2015 Canadian federal election: St. John's South—Mount Pearl
Party	Candidate	Votes	%	±%	Expenditures
Liberal	Seamus O'Regan	25,992	57.86	+29.16	$124,533.70
New Democratic	Ryan Cleary	16,467	36.76	–9.58	$98,225.69
Conservative	Marek Krol	2,047	4.57	–19.64	$24,331.40
Green	Jackson McLean	365	0.81	+0.09	–
Total valid votes/expense limit		44,801	100.00		$201,093.98
Total rejected ballots		133	0.30		
Turnout		44,934	67.13		
Eligible voters		66,936			
Liberal gain from New Democratic		Swing		+19.37	
Source: Elections Canada

2011 Canadian federal election: St. John's South—Mount Pearl
Party	Candidate	Votes	%	±%	Expenditures
New Democratic	Ryan Cleary	18,681	47.92	+7.36	$67,211.17
Liberal	Siobhán Coady	11,130	28.55	-14.77	$81,760.42
Conservative	Loyola Sullivan	8,883	22.79	+10.24	$78,347.37
Green	Rick Austin	291	0.75	-1.11	none listed
Total valid votes/expense limit		38,985	100.0	–	$82,628.65
Total rejected, declined and unmarked ballots		108	0.28	+0.01	
Turnout		39,093	58.97	+7.02	
Eligible voters		66,294			
New Democratic gain from Liberal		Swing		+11.06	

2008 Canadian federal election: St. John's South—Mount Pearl
Party	Candidate	Votes	%	±%	Expenditures
Liberal	Siobhán Coady	14,920	43.32	+10.32	$63,155.64
New Democratic	Ryan Cleary	13,971	40.56	+18.87	$18,947.03
Conservative	Merv Wiseman	4,324	12.55	-32.13	$63,115.88
Green	Ted Warren	643	1.86	+1.23	$172.03
Newfoundland and Labrador First	Greg Byrne	402	1.16	–	$2,908.17
Independent	Terry Christopher Butler	179	0.51	–	none listed
Total valid votes/expense limit		34,439	100.0	–	$80,167
Total rejected, declined and unmarked ballots		92	0.27	-0.06	
Turnout		34,531	51.95		
Eligible voters		66,467			
Liberal gain from Conservative		Swing		-4.28	
