= Calvin Normore =

Calvin Normore (born June 25, 1948) is the Brian P. Copenhaver Professor of Philosophy at the University of California, Los Angeles. He is an expert in medieval philosophy and the history of logic.

== Life and career ==
Normore was born in Corner Brook, Newfoundland and Labrador, Canada, the son of former Newfoundland and Labrador New Democratic Party leader Calvin Normore. He earned a PhD at the University of Toronto in 1976. He has taught philosophy at Princeton University, University of Toronto and McGill University, where he held the Macdonald Chair in Moral Philosophy.

Normore is a past president of the Pacific division of the American Philosophical Association and was elected a Fellow of the American Academy of Arts and Sciences in 2008.

== Philosophical work ==
A few of his publications are "The Necessity in Deduction: Cartesian Inference and its Medieval Background," "Material Supposition and the Mental Language of Ockham's Summa Logicae", "Fool's Good and Other Issues: Comments on Self-Knowledge and Resentment", "Scotus, Modality, Instants of Nature and the Contingency of the Present".
