= Peg Norman =

Canadian documentary filmmaker (born 1964)

- Born: 1964 (age 61–62); Gambo, Newfoundland, Canada
- Occupations: documentary filmmaker, social worker, small business owner
- Political party: New Democratic
- Spouse: Gerry Rogers (m. 2017)

Peg Norman (born 1964 in Gambo, Newfoundland) is a Canadian documentary filmmaker, best known for her role in the film My Left Breast, which documented her partner Gerry Rogers' breast cancer.

Norman helped found and for ten years managed Henry Morgentaler's clinic in St. John's. She ran for political office in Newfoundland and Labrador. In 2004 and 2006, she ran for the House of Commons of Canada, as a candidate of the New Democratic Party in St. John's South—Mount Pearl, but lost to Loyola Hearn of the Conservative Party of Canada. In 2004 and 2006, Norman placed third to Hearn. In 2010 Norman owned a small business in St. John's.

Openly lesbian, Norman is the partner of social worker, filmmaker, and politician Gerry Rogers.

== Filmmaker ==
Norman's film My Left Breast, documents her partner Gerry Rogers' breast cancer. The film received multiple awards and won Norman campaign funding from Rosie O'Donnell. The film also gained Norman's partner Rogers a spot on The Rosie O'Donnell Show in 2001.

== Electoral record ==
2006 Canadian federal election: St. John's South—Mount Pearl
Party	Candidate	Votes	%	±%	Expenditures
Conservative	Loyola Hearn	16,644	44.68	+5.11	$67,639.04
Liberal	Siobhán Coady	12,295	33.00	-2.26	$68,791.05
New Democratic	Peg Norman	8,079	21.69	-2.02	$40,492.63
Green	Barry Crozier	235	0.63	-0.83	none listed
Total valid votes/expense limit		37,253	100.0	–	$73,776
Total rejected, declined and unmarked ballots		124	0.33	+0.03	
Turnout		37,371	57.90	+5.42	
Eligible voters		64,543			
Conservative hold		Swing		+3.68	

2004 Canadian federal election: St. John's South—Mount Pearl
Party	Candidate	Votes	%	±%	Expenditures
Conservative	Loyola Hearn	13,330	39.57	-16.27	$63,090.26
Liberal	Siobhán Coady	11,879	35.26	+4.91	$63,121.27
New Democratic	Peg Norman	7989	23.71	+10.31	$36,839.75
Green	Steve Willcott	493	1.46	–	$184.24
Total valid votes/expense limit		33,691	100.0	–	$72,104
Total rejected, declined and unmarked ballots		103	0.30		
Turnout		33,794	52.48	-1.38	
Eligible voters		64,397			
Conservative notional gain from Progressive Conservative		Swing		-10.59	
Changes from 2000 are based on redistributed results. Change for the Conservatives is based on the combined totals of the Progressive Conservatives and the Canadian Alliance.

== See also ==
- List of female film and television directors
- List of lesbian filmmakers
- List of LGBT-related films directed by women
