= Windsor Lake =

Provincial electoral district in Newfoundland and Labrador, Canada

Newfoundland and Labrador electoral district
- Location in the St. John's area

Provincial electoral district
- Legislature: Newfoundland and Labrador House of Assembly
MHA
John Hogan
Liberal
- District created: 2015
- First contested: 2015
- Last contested: 2025

Demographics
- Population (2011): 14,187
- Electors (2015): 9,145
- Area (km²): 50
- Census division: Division No. 1
- Census subdivision: St. John's (part)

Windsor Lake is a provincial electoral district in Newfoundland and Labrador, Canada. In 2011 there were 14,187 people living in the district. Windsor Lake includes part of the city of St. John's suburban east end, covering the neighbourhoods of Clovelly Trails, Anne Jeannette, Airport Heights, Ricketts Bridge, Spruce Meadows, Kents Pond, Bells Turn, and Little Canada.

The district was created following the 2015 electoral districts boundaries review. The district includes parts of the former districts of Cape St. Francis, Conception Bay East-Bell Island, St. John's East, St. John's North, and Virginia Waters.

The district is currently represented by Opposition Leader John Hogan.

== Members of the House of Assembly ==
The district has elected the following members of the House of Assembly:

Assembly	Years	Member	Party
Riding created from Cape St. Francis, Conception Bay East–Bell Island, St. John's East, St. John's North, and Virginia Waters.
48th	2015–2018	Cathy Bennett	Liberal
48th	2018–2019	Ches Crosbie	Progressive Conservative
49th	2019–2021	Ches Crosbie	Progressive Conservative
50th	2021–2025	John Hogan	Liberal
51st	2025–present	John Hogan	Liberal

== Election results ==
Graph of election results (minor parties that never got 2% of the vote or did not run consistently are omitted) View source data.

2025 Newfoundland and Labrador general election
Party	Candidate	Votes	%	±%
Liberal	John Hogan	3,424	69.27	+18.69
Progressive Conservative	Deanne Stapleton	1,052	21.28	-19.25
New Democratic	Marcia Porter	467	9.45	+0.57
Total valid votes		4,943		
Total rejected ballots				
Turnout				
Eligible voters				
Liberal hold		Swing		+18.97

2021 Newfoundland and Labrador general election
Party	Candidate	Votes	%	±%
Liberal	John Hogan	2,688	50.58	+12.12
Progressive Conservative	Ches Crosbie	2,154	40.53	-8.18
New Democratic	Tomás Shea	472	8.88	-3.94
Total valid votes		5,314	99.27	
Total rejected ballots		39	0.73	
Turnout		5,353	56.68	
Eligible voters		9,444		
Liberal gain from Progressive Conservative		Swing		+10.15
Source(s) "Officially Nominated Candidates General Election 2021" (PDF). Elections Newfoundland and Labrador. "NL Election 2021 (Unofficial Results)".

2019 Newfoundland and Labrador general election
Party	Candidate	Votes	%	±%
Progressive Conservative	Ches Crosbie	2,644	48.71	+6.01
Liberal	Bob Osborne	2,088	38.47	+0.34
New Democratic	Tomás Shea	696	12.82	-6.35
Total valid votes		5,428	99.36	
Total rejected ballots		35	0.64	+0.43
Turnout		5,436	59.65	+7.25
Eligible voters		9,159		
Progressive Conservative hold		Swing		+2.83

By-election - September 20, 2018 On the resignation of Cathy Bennett, August 21, 2018
Party	Candidate	Votes	%	±%
Progressive Conservative	Ches Crosbie	2,034	42.70	+22.49
Liberal	Paul Antle	1,816	38.13	-28.18
New Democratic	Kerri Claire Neil	913	19.17	+5.69
Total valid votes		4,763		
Progressive Conservative gain from Liberal		Swing		+25.33

2015 Newfoundland and Labrador general election
Party	Candidate	Votes	%
Liberal	Cathy Bennett	3,182	66.31
Progressive Conservative	Ryan Cleary	970	20.21
New Democratic	Don Rowe	647	13.48
Total valid votes		4,799	99.46
Total rejected ballots		26	0.54
Turnout		4,825	52.76
Eligible voters		9,145	

== See also ==
- List of Newfoundland and Labrador provincial electoral districts
- Canadian provincial electoral districts

Newfoundland and Labrador House of Assembly
Preceded by Humber-Gros Morne	Constituency represented by the premier of Newfoundland and Labrador; May 2025–October 2025	Succeeded by Stephenville-Port au Port
