= 2006 New Democratic Party of Newfoundland and Labrador leadership election =

- May 28, 2006
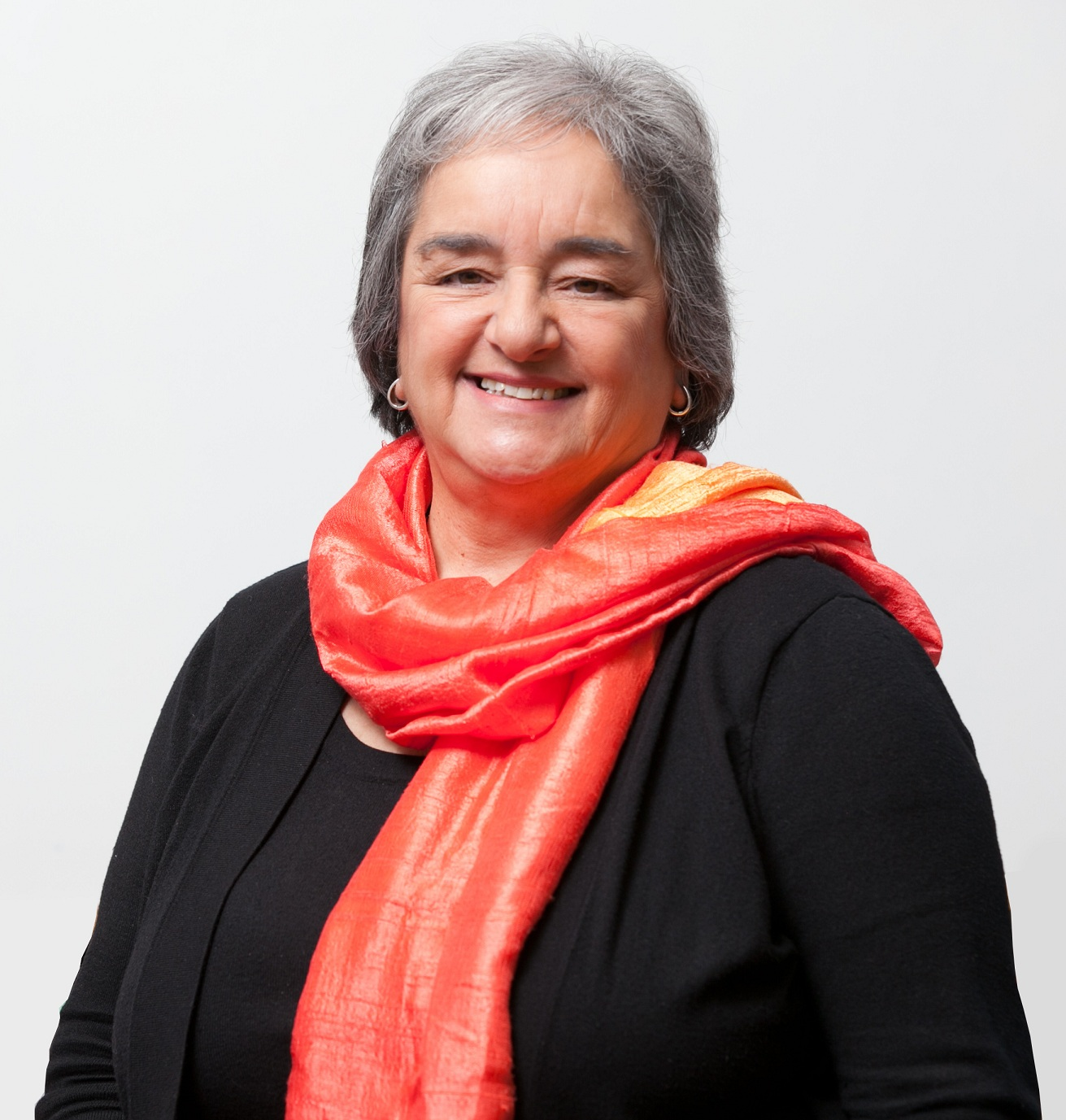
		NP
Candidate	Lorraine Michael	Nina Patey
Results	107 (95.54%)	5 (4.46%)
Leader before election
Jack Harris
Leader after election
Lorraine Michael

2006 New Democratic Party of Newfoundland and Labrador leadership election
- Date: May 28, 2006
- Convention: St. John's, Newfoundland and Labrador
- Resigning leader: Jack Harris
- Won by: Lorraine Michael
- Ballots: 1
- Candidates: 2

The New Democratic Party of Newfoundland and Labrador held their leadership convention from May 26–28, 2006. This leadership election was called to elect a new leader to succeed Jack Harris, who had served as party leader since 1992. Harris had also served as Member of the House of Assembly for Signal Hill-Quidi Vidi since a 1990 by-election. In the end Lorraine Michael won the party's leadership, defeating writer Nina Patey. Michael won 107 votes to Patey’s 5. Lorraine Michael, later went on to win the by-election held in Harris' district, Signal Hill-Quidi Vidi and became one of two NDP MHAs in the House of Assembly.

== Candidates ==
- Lorraine Michael, a social activist and former nun who served as a high school teacher and principal under the Roman Catholic School Board.
- Nina Patey, a writer who ran unsuccessfully for the federal New Democrats in the 1984 federal election in the riding of St. John's West. She also unsuccessfully ran for the provincial New Democrats in 1985 provincial election in the district of St. John's Centre.

== Potential candidates who did not run ==
- Peg Norman, documentary filmmaker, social worker and two time federal New Democratic Party candidate. Norman ran unsuccessfully in the 2004 federal election in the riding of St. John's South and in the 2006 federal election in the riding of St. John's South—Mount Pearl. In the 2011 provincial election Norman's partner, Gerry Rogers, was elected to the Newfoundland and Labrador House of Assembly. Rogers was elected NL NDP leader in 2018 serving until 2019.

== Results ==
	First Ballot	
Candidate	Votes	Perc.
Lorraine Michael	107	95.54%
Nina Patey	5	4.46%
Spoiled Ballots	0	0.00%
Totals	112	100%
