= List of Newfoundland and Labrador provincial electoral districts =

Newfoundland and Labrador provincial electoral districts are currently single member ridings that each elect one member to the Newfoundland and Labrador House of Assembly.

Harbour Main formerly elected two members at one time.

== List of current districts ==
- Baie Verte-Green Bay
- Bonavista
- Burgeo-La Poile
- Burin-Grand Bank
- Cape St. Francis
- Carbonear-Trinity-Bay de Verde
- Cartwright-L'Anse au Clair
- Conception Bay East–Bell Island
- Conception Bay South
- Corner Brook
- Exploits
- Ferryland
- Fogo Island-Cape Freels
- Fortune Bay-Cape La Hune
- Gander
- Grand Falls-Windsor-Buchans
- Harbour Grace-Port de Grave
- Harbour Main
- Humber-Bay of Islands
- Humber-Gros Morne
- Labrador West
- Lake Melville
- Lewisporte-Twillingate
- Mount Pearl-Southlands
- Mount Pearl North
- Mount Scio
- Placentia-St. Mary's
- Placentia West-Bellevue
- St. Barbe-L'Anse aux Meadows
- St. George's-Humber
- St. John's Centre
- St. John's East-Quidi Vidi
- St. John's West
- Stephenville-Port au Port
- Terra Nova
- Topsail-Paradise
- Torngat Mountains
- Virginia Waters-Pleasantville
- Waterford Valley
- Windsor Lake

== Former or defunct districts ==
- Bellevue (electoral district)
- Bonavista North
- Bonavista South
- Burin-Placentia West
- Carbonear-Harbour Grace
- Grand Bank (electoral district)
- Grand Falls-Windsor-Green Bay South
- Humber East
- Humber Valley (electoral district)
- Humber West
- Lewisporte (electoral district)
- The Isles of Notre Dame
- Kilbride (electoral district)
- Mount Pearl South
- Pleasantville (electoral district)
- Port au Port (electoral district)
- Port de Grave (electoral district)
- Signal Hill-Quidi Vidi
- St. Barbe (electoral district)
- St. George's-Stephenville East
- St. John's East (provincial electoral district)
- St. John's North (provincial electoral district)
- St. John's South (provincial electoral district)
- The Straits – White Bay North
- Topsail (electoral district)
- Trinity North
- Virginia Waters

== See also ==
- Canadian provincial electoral districts
- 50th General Assembly of Newfoundland and Labrador
