= Signal Hill-Quidi Vidi =

Former provincial electoral district in Newfoundland and Labrador, Canada

Newfoundland and Labrador electoral district
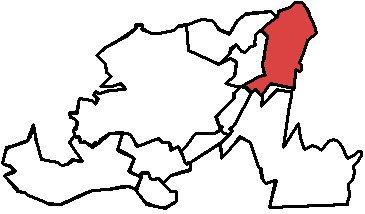
- Signal Hill-Quidi Vidi in relation to other districts in St. John's
- Coordinates: 47.600°N 52.691°W

Defunct provincial electoral district
- Legislature: Newfoundland and Labrador House of Assembly
- District created: 1996
- District abolished: 2015
- First contested: 1996
- Last contested: 2011

Demographics
- Population (2006): 11,718
- Electors (2011): 8,137

Signal Hill-Quidi Vidi is a former provincial electoral district for the House of Assembly of Newfoundland and Labrador, Canada. In 2011 there were 8,137 eligible voters living within the district.

The district included the east end of the downtown St. John's, and ran north to Newfoundland Drive. The residential mix ranged from apartments and refurbished townhouses in the older part of the city to the edges of suburban subdivisions in the east end.

The last MHA was New Democratic Party MHA, Lorraine Michael. This district was also represented by former Newfoundland and Labrador NDP leader, Jack Harris from 1990 to 2006. The district was abolished in 2015, and became St. John's East-Quidi Vidi.

== Members of the House of Assembly ==
The district has elected the following members of the House of Assembly:

Assembly	Years	Member	Party
St. John's East
31st	1956–1959	James Higgins	Progressive Conservative
32nd	1959–1962	James Greene	Progressive Conservative
33rd	1962–1966	James Greene	Progressive Conservative
34th	1966–1970	Gerald Ottenheimer	Progressive Conservative
34th	1970–1971	William Marshall	Progressive Conservative
35th	1971–1972	William Marshall	Progressive Conservative
36th	1972–1975	William Marshall	Progressive Conservative
37th	1975–1979	William Marshall	Progressive Conservative
38th	1979–1982	William Marshall	Progressive Conservative
39th	1982–1985	William Marshall	Progressive Conservative
40th	1985–1986	William Marshall	Progressive Conservative
40th	1986–1989	Gene Long	New Democratic
41st	1989–1990	Shannie Duff	Progressive Conservative
41st	1990–1993	Jack Harris	New Democratic
42nd	1993–1996	Jack Harris	New Democratic
Signal Hill–Quidi Vidi
43rd	1996–1999	Jack Harris	New Democratic
43rd	1999–2003	Jack Harris	New Democratic
44th	2003–2006	Jack Harris	New Democratic
44th	2006–2007	Lorraine Michael	New Democratic
45th	2007–2011	Lorraine Michael	New Democratic
46th	2011–2015	Lorraine Michael	New Democratic

== Results ==
=== Signal Hill-Quidi Vidi ===
2011 Newfoundland and Labrador general election
Party	Candidate	Votes	%	±%
NDP	Lorraine Michael	3,239	65.28	+8.5
Progressive Conservative	John Noseworthy	1,550	31.24	-8.4
Liberal	Drew Brown	173	3.49	-0.1

2007 Newfoundland and Labrador general election
Party	Candidate	Votes	%	±%
NDP	Lorraine Michael	3,062	56.8	+1.6
Progressive Conservative	Maria Afonso	2,135	39.6	-5.2
Liberal	Maura Beam	196	3.6	+3.6

By-Election, November 1, 2006 On the resignation of Jack Harris, May, 2006
Party	Candidate	Votes	%	±%
New Democrat	Lorraine Michael	1,968	55.2	+6.7
Progressive Conservative	Jerome Kennedy	1,595	44.8	+1.0

2003 Newfoundland and Labrador general election
Party	Candidate	Votes	%	±%
New Democrat	Jack Harris	2,456	48.5	
Progressive Conservative	Karen Carroll	2,221	43.8	
Liberal	Ray O'Neill	391	7.7	

1999 Newfoundland and Labrador general election
Party	Candidate	Votes	%	+/-
New Democrat	Jack Harris	2,179	41.91	-9.2
Liberal	Pete Soucy	2,010	38.66	+8.4
Progressive Conservative	Chris O'Brien	793	15.25	-1.2
Newfoundland and Labrador Party	Paul David Hillier	116	2.23	+2.2
Independent	Shaun Dunn	53	1.02	+1.0
Terra Nova Greens	John Whelan	48	0.92	+0.9

1996 Newfoundland and Labrador general election
Party	Candidate	Votes	%	+/-
New Democrat	Jack Harris	2,800	51.07	+7.4
Liberal	Joan Cook	1,661	30.29	+2.0
Progressive Conservative	Cy Mills	902	16.45	-7.6
Terra Nova Greens	Jason Crummey	120	2.19	+2.2

=== St. John's East ===
1993 Newfoundland and Labrador general election
Party	Candidate	Votes	%	+/-
New Democrat	Jack Harris	2,336	43.67	-5.6
Liberal	Joan Cook	1,728	32.31	+1.5
Progressive Conservative	Sean Fitzgerald	1,285	24.02	+4.1

By-Election, December 11, 1990 - Resignation of Shannie Duff
Party	Candidate	Votes	%	+/-
New Democrat	Jack Harris	1,977	49.24	+12.0
Liberal	Barbara Chalker	1,237	30.81	+9.6
Progressive Conservative	John Ottenheimer	801	19.95	-21.8

1989 Newfoundland and Labrador general election
Party	Candidate	Votes	%	±%
Progressive Conservative	Shannie Duff	2,397	41.7	+6.7
NDP	Gene Long	2,137	37.2	-4.58
Liberal	Lynette Billard	1,212	21.1	-2.12

By-Election, 1986 - Resignation of William Marshall
Party	Candidate	Votes	%	+/-
New Democrat	Gene Long	1,693	41.78	+5.48
Progressive Conservative	Shannie Duff	1,418	35.00	-15.2
Liberal	Rex Murphy	941	23.22	+9.72

1985 Newfoundland and Labrador general election
Party	Candidate	Votes	%	±%
Progressive Conservative	William Marshall	2,738	50.2	-18.3
NDP	Gene Long	1,981	36.3	+17.8
Liberal	Hugh Shea	738	13.5	+0.5

1982 Newfoundland and Labrador general election
Party	Candidate	Votes	%	±%
Progressive Conservative	William Marshall	2,021	68.5	-2.2
NDP	Nancy Riche	546	18.5	+6.7
Liberal	Hugh Coady	382	13.0	-4.4

1979 Newfoundland and Labrador general election
Party	Candidate	Votes	%	±%
Progressive Conservative	William Marshall	2,111	70.7	–
Liberal	Jaime Wyatt	520	17.4	
NDP	David Thompson	353	11.8	

== See also ==
- List of Newfoundland and Labrador provincial electoral districts
- Canadian provincial electoral districts
