= Ed Finn =

Canadian trade unionist and politician (1926–2020)

Leader of the Newfoundland and Labrador New Democratic Party
- In office 1959–1963
- Preceded by: Himself, as leader of the Newfoundland Democratic Party
- Succeeded by: Calvin Normore

Personal details
- Born: Edward Finn; June 4, 1926 Spaniard's Bay, Newfoundland and Labrador
- Died: December 27, 2020 (aged 94)
- Spouse: Geraldine (Dena) Pelletier
- Children: 2

Edward (Ed) Finn Jr. CM (June 4, 1926 – December 27, 2020) was a Canadian trade unionist and journalist, editor, author and former Newfoundland politician. He was the leader of the Newfoundland Democratic Party and the first leader of the Newfoundland New Democratic Party.

== Early years ==
Finn was born in Spaniard's Bay, Newfoundland and raised in Corner Brook. His father worked at the Bowater's paper mill during the Great Depression. In 1942, Finn joined his father at the paper mill at the age of 16 and worked there for four years. He went into journalism working for Corner Brook's local newspaper, The Western Star from 1946 to 1953, when he went to work for the Montreal Gazette for two years before returning to the Western Star in 1955 as editor.

== Loggers' strike ==
Under his stewardship The Western Star sympathetically covered the Newfoundland loggers' strike of 1958-59. Finn later wrote of the period "It was such a heated and emotionally charged labour dispute that journalistic objectivity was simply not tolerated... you were either with the paper companies and the government, or you were with a gang of mainland union thugs, which was how the International Woodworkers' of America (IWA) leaders were unfairly depicted."

Newfoundland Premier Joey Smallwood responded to the labour dispute by introducing legislation to decertify the International Woodworkers of America.

Finn, as editor of the Western Star, war ordered by the newspaper's publishers to report only the company's and government's side of the dispute. As a result, Finn and three other journalists quit the newspaper. He and two friends started their own newspaper, The Newfoundland Examiner with Finn as publisher and editor and devoted the journal to uncovering government and business corruption. The newspaper was unable to attract advertising revenue and folded after a year.

== Political career ==
As a result of the strike, labour unions with the support of the Canadian Labour Congress founded the Newfoundland Democratic Party in 1959 in an attempt to give political expression to the workers movement and in an attempt to channel worker opposition to the Liberal government of Joey Smallwood. The new party absorbed the small Newfoundland section of the Co-operative Commonwealth Federation and anticipated the 1961 founding of the New Democratic Party (NDP) of Canada by the Canadian Labour Congress and the CCF.

After being fired by his publisher, Finn was hired by the Canadian Labour Congress and persuaded to lead the Newfoundland Democratic Party into the 1959 provincial election. Smallwood sent his Minister of Labour, Charlie Ballam, to run against Finn in Humber West. Finn came within less than 300 votes of defeating Ballam. He remained leader of the Newfoundland Democratic Party, which became the Newfoundland New Democratic Party, until 1963 and ran in the 1962 provincial election as well as for the federal NDP in Humber—St. George's in the 1962 and 1963 federal elections but was unable to win a seat in either the Newfoundland House of Assembly or the House of Commons of Canada.

== Later career ==
In 1963, Finn resigned as NDP leader and moved to Ottawa to accept a position with the Canadian Brotherhood of Railway, Transport and General Workers. He remained with that union until 1980 when he and four other union staffers were dismissed after they refused to open mail during a strike by the union's clerical staff. He then joined the Canadian Union of Public Employees with whom he remained until his retirement in 1991.

Finn also wrote a weekly labour column for the Toronto Star from 1968 until 1982.

He worked for the Canadian Centre for Policy Alternatives from 1993 to 2014 and was the founder and editor of its monthly journal and flagship publication, The CCPA Monitor. The CCPA published several collections of Finn's essays in three books, The Right is Wrong and the Left Is Right - Cutting through the Neoliberal Bafflegab, Under Corporate Rule and Who Do We Try to Rescue Today?. Finn’s memoir, Ed Finn: A Journalist’s Life on the Left, was published in October 2013.

In 2020, Ed Finn was appointed as a Member of the Order of Canada.

He died of pneumonia at age 94 on December 27, 2020.
