= Esau Thoms =

Esau Edward Thoms (1926–1979) was a labour organizer and political leader in Newfoundland and Labrador. Thoms was born in 1926 in St. Thomas, Newfoundland and Labrador and worked for the Newfoundland Railway and then Canadian National Railway from 1943 until 1966. He became chairman of the Brotherhood of Railway and Airline Clerks in 1966 and also served as president of the Newfoundland Federation of Labour from 1960 to 1968.

Thoms was a founding member of the Newfoundland Democratic Party in the late 1950s which merged with the Newfoundland Co-operative Commonwealth Federation to become the Newfoundland New Democratic Party. Thoms was twice a CCF candidate and once an NDP candidate in St. John's West for the 1957, 1958, and 1965 federal elections and was the interim leader of the provincial NDP from 1966 to 1970.
