= Virginia Waters (electoral district) =

Former provincial electoral district in Newfoundland and Labrador, Canada

Newfoundland and Labrador electoral district
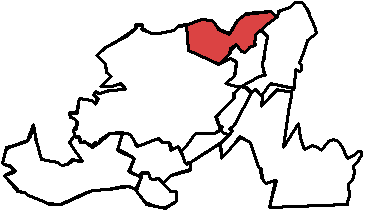
- Virginia Waters in relation to the other St. John's districts

Defunct provincial electoral district
- Legislature: Newfoundland and Labrador House of Assembly
- District created: 1995
- District abolished: 2015
- First contested: 1996
- Last contested: 2014

Demographics
- Population (2006): 11,943
- Electors (2011): 9,938
- Census division: Division 1
- Census subdivision: St. John's

Virginia Waters is a defunct provincial electoral district for the House of Assembly of Newfoundland and Labrador, Canada. The district was represented by former premier Kathy Dunderdale.

A residential district in the northeast end of St. John's, the area included Airport Heights, Wedgewood Park, residential areas off Newfoundland Drive, as well as a fairly wealthy enclave near Virginia Lake. The district was created in 1995 from parts of the districts of Pleasantville, St. John's East Extern and Mount Scio Road-Bell Island. Virginia Waters retained 80 per cent of its original territory in the 2007 redistribution, while taking in 14 per cent of Cape St. Francis. In 2011 there were 9,938 eligible voters living within the district.

The district was abolished in 2015, into new districts of Windsor Lake and Virginia Waters-Pleasantville.

== Members of the House of Assembly ==
The district has elected the following members of the House of Assembly:

| Assembly | Years | Member | Party |
|---|---|---|---|
| 43rd | 1996–1999 | Walter Noel | Liberal |
| 44th | 1999–2003 | Walter Noel | Liberal |
| 45th | 2003–2007 | Kathy Dunderdale | Progressive Conservative |
| 46th | 2007–2011 | Kathy Dunderdale | Progressive Conservative |
| 47th | 2011–2014 | Kathy Dunderdale | Progressive Conservative |
| 47th | 2014–2015 | Cathy Bennett | Liberal |

== Election results ==
By-election April 9, 2014 On the resignation of Kathy Dunderdale, February 28, 2014
| Party | Candidate | Votes | % | ±% |
|---|---|---|---|---|
| Liberal | Cathy Bennett | 1,932 | 39.88 | +30.33 |
| Progressive Conservative | Danny Breen | 1,892 | 39.05 | -20.99 |
| NDP | Sheilagh O'Leary | 1,021 | 21.07 | -9.35 |
| Total valid votes | | 4,895 | 99.84 | |
| Rejected | | 8 | 0.16 | -0.14 |
| Turnout | | 4,853 | 49.25 | -6.14 |
| Eligible voters | | 9,853 | | |
| Liberal gain from Progressive Conservative | | Swing | | +25.66 |

2011 Newfoundland and Labrador general election
| Party | Candidate | Votes | % | ±% |
|---|---|---|---|---|
| Progressive Conservative | Kathy Dunderdale | 3,371 | 60.04 | -13.01 |
| NDP | Dave Sullivan | 1,708 | 30.42 | +17.59 |
| Liberal | Sheila Miller | 536 | 9.55 | +1.80 |
| Total valid votes | | 5,615 | 99.70 | |
| Rejected | | 17 | 0.30 | +0.09 |
| Turnout | | 5,632 | 55.39 | -0.73 |
| Eligible voters | | 10,168 | | |
| Progressive Conservative hold | | Swing | | -15.30 |

2007 Newfoundland and Labrador general election
| Party | Candidate | Votes | % | ±% |
|---|---|---|---|---|
| Progressive Conservative | Kathy Dunderdale | 4,043 | 73.04 | +14.95 |
| NDP | David Sullivan | 710 | 12.83 | +3.60 |
| Liberal | Drew Brown | 429 | 7.75 | -24.92 |
| Independent | Fred Wilcox | 353 | 6.38 | - |
| Total valid votes | | 5,535 | 99.78 | |
| Rejected | | 12 | 0.22 | +0.05 |
| Turnout | | 5,547 | 56.12 | -13.03 |
| Eligible voters | | 9,885 | | |
| Progressive Conservative hold | | Swing | | +5.67 |

^ Change is not from redistributed results.

2003 Newfoundland and Labrador general election
| Party | Candidate | Votes | % | ±% |
|---|---|---|---|---|
| Progressive Conservative | Kathy Dunderdale | 4,193 | 58.10 | +21.77 |
| Liberal | Walter Noel | 2,358 | 32.67 | -14.76 |
| NDP | David Sullivan | 666 | 9.23 | -4.92 |
| Total valid votes | | 7,217 | 99.83 | |
| Rejected | | 12 | 0.17 | -0.01 |
| Turnout | | 7,229 | 69.14 | -3.94 |
| Eligible voters | | 10,455 | | |
| Progressive Conservative gain from Liberal | | Swing | | +18.27 |

1999 Newfoundland general election
| Party | Candidate | Votes | % | ±% |
|---|---|---|---|---|
| Liberal | Walter Noel | 2,973 | 47.43 | -8.24 |
| Progressive Conservative | Paul Walsh | 2,277 | 36.33 | +0.41 |
| NDP | Amanda Will | 887 | 14.15 | +5.74 |
| Independent | Deanne Stapleton | 131 | 2.09 | |
| Total valid votes | | 6,268 | 99.82 | |
| Rejected | | 11 | 0.18 | -0.01 |
| Turnout | | 6,279 | 73.08 | -3.14 |
| Eligible voters | | 8,592 | | |
| Liberal hold | | Swing | | -4.32 |

1996 Newfoundland and Labrador general election
| Party | Candidate | Votes | % |
|---|---|---|---|
| Liberal | Walter Noel | 3,639 | 55.67 |
| Progressive Conservative | Bev LeMoine | 2,348 | 35.92 |
| NDP | Bob Buckingham | 550 | 8.41 |
| Total valid votes | | 6,537 | 99.82 |
| Rejected | | 12 | 0.18 |
| Turnout | | 6,549 | 76.22 |
| Eligible voters | | 8,592 | |
Source: Elections Newfoundland and Labrador

== See also ==
- List of Newfoundland and Labrador provincial electoral districts
- Canadian provincial electoral districts

Newfoundland and Labrador House of Assembly
| Preceded by Humber West | Constituency represented by the premier of Newfoundland and Labrador; 2010-2014 | Succeeded by Humber East |
