= John Connors (Canadian politician) =

Canadian educator and politician

John Lorne Connors (born 1944 or 1945) is a Canadian educator and former politician who was leader of the Newfoundland New Democratic Party from 1970 to 1974. Connors was elected party leader in 1970 and was a 26-year-old schoolteacher from Windsor, Newfoundland and Labrador when he led the party into the 1971 Newfoundland general election. The party had never won a seat in an election and Connors hoped to win three seats and hold the balance of power in what was expected to be a close election between long-time premier Joey Smallwood's incumbent Liberals and Frank Moores' Progressive Conservatives. Connors was the youngest party leader in Canada at the time and had previously run for the federal New Democrats in St. John's West in the 1968 Canadian federal election. In the 1971 provincial election, he ran in Grand Falls against education minister Frederick William Rowe. While the election results between the Liberals and Progressive Conservatives were close, with the Conservatives winning 21 seats and the Liberals 20 in a hung parliament, the NDP was again shut out electing none of its 17 candidates, with Connors losing in Grand Falls to the Conservative candidate. Overall, the NDP won 3,719 votes. Months later, a snap election was called by the new Conservative premier. In the March 1972 Newfoundland general election the NDP stood only five candidates and won only 410 votes, with Connors only winning 200 votes in the riding he contested.

Nevertheless, Connors was re-elected as NDP leader at the party's November 1972 bi-annual convention, defeating a challenge by Edgar Russell. However, he was replaced as leader in 1974 by Gerald Panting.

After leaving politics, Connors joined Memorial University working for 26 years at the university's Fisheries and Marine Institute in senior management positions including a term as Head of the School of Maritime Studies.
