= Alison Coffin =

Canadian politician (born 1970)

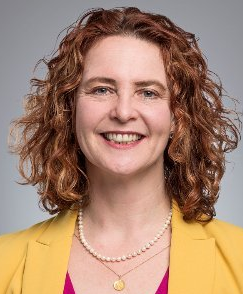
- Coffin in 2020

Leader of the Newfoundland and Labrador New Democratic Party
- In office March 5, 2019 – October 19, 2021
- Preceded by: Gerry Rogers
- Succeeded by: Jim Dinn (interim)

Member of the Newfoundland and Labrador House of Assembly for St. John's East-Quidi Vidi
- In office May 16, 2019 – March 27, 2021
- Preceded by: Lorraine Michael
- Succeeded by: John Abbott

Personal details
- Born: 1970 (age 55–56) Corner Brook, Newfoundland, Canada
- Party: Independent (since 2025)
- Other political affiliations: New Democratic (until 2025)
- Occupation: economist, university professor

Alison Coffin (born 1970) is a Canadian politician, who was the leader of the Newfoundland and Labrador New Democratic Party (NL NDP). She is a former member of the Newfoundland and Labrador House of Assembly. In her professional life, she has developed policy and strategic plans for the provincial government, taught at Memorial University, and consulted on public policy, pension plans, and the provincial budget. For several years, she also ran a successful consulting company.

== Background ==
Coffin was born in Corner Brook and was raised in Joe Batt's Arm along with two brothers. She graduated from Memorial University with an economics degree in 1993 and later completed her master's degree at York University in Toronto, graduating in 1997. She splits her time between St. John's, Brigus, and Spaniard's Bay with her partner Ian Coombs.

Professionally, Coffin is an economist and university professor. Her most recent professional publication, "Taking Politics out of Governance", included in The Democracy Cookbook outlines straightforward suggestions for better provincial budgeting, spending, and planning.

== Politics ==
Coffin ran for the NL NDP in the 2015 provincial election in Waterford Valley. She ran for the provincial party leadership election in April 2018, losing to MHA Gerry Rogers. After Rogers resigned, Coffin was elected leader unopposed in March 2019. She was confirmed as the party's new leader at a news conference on March 5, 2019. Coffin is a former associate president of the provincial party.

Coffin led the party into the 2019 provincial election; despite only nominating 14 candidates (out of a possible 40) the party won 3 seats. Coffin won St. John's East-Quidi Vidi holding it for the NDP, while the party led St. John's Centre, and won an upset in Labrador West.

Coffin led the party into the 2021 provincial election. She was personally defeated in her district of St. John's East-Quidi Vidi; while the party held St. John's Centre and Labrador West. Coffin filed for a recount. On May 12, 2021, Supreme Court Justice Donald Burrage rejected Coffin's bid for a recount, arguing that there was not sufficient evidence.

On October 16, 2021, Coffin lost a leadership review by party members. She resigned on October 19 and was replaced by MHA Jim Dinn as interim leader. On August 15, 2025, John Abbott resigned his seat in the House of Assembly. He did this to avoid a legal battle stemming from the disputed results in the St. John's East-Quidi Vidi riding.

In the 2025 provincial election, Coffin ran as an independent candidate in both Carbonear-Trinity-Bay de Verde and Harbour Grace-Port de Grave on a platform of election reform, losing in both. She is the first person since Henry Renouf in the 1869 Newfoundland general election to run in more than one riding.

== Electoral history ==
2025 Newfoundland and Labrador general election: Harbour Grace-Port de Grave
Party	Candidate	Votes	%	±%
Liberal	Pam Parsons	3,750	59.20	-11.89
Progressive Conservative	Walter Yetman	2,241	35.38	+10.97
Independent	Alison Coffin	233	3.68	
New Democratic	Darian Vincent	110	1.74	-2.75
Total valid votes		6,334		
Total rejected ballots				
Turnout				
Eligible voters				
Liberal hold		Swing		-11.43

2025 Newfoundland and Labrador general election: Carbonear-Trinity-Bay de Verde
Party	Candidate	Votes	%	±%
Progressive Conservative	Riley Balsom	3,459	49.88	+22.18
Liberal	Danielle Doyle	3,085	44.48	-23.05
New Democratic	Kathleen Burt	242	3.49	-1.04
Independent	Alison Coffin	134	1.93	
Independent	Edward Thomas Cole	15	0.22	-0.03
Total valid votes		6,935		
Total rejected ballots				
Turnout				
Eligible voters				
Progressive Conservative gain from Liberal		Swing		+22.62

2021 Newfoundland and Labrador general election: St. John's East-Quidi Vidi
Party	Candidate	Votes	%	±%
Liberal	John Abbott	2,447	42.95	+9.57
New Democratic	Alison Coffin	2,394	42.02	−1.46
Progressive Conservative	Vaughn Hammond	856	15.03	−8.11
Total valid votes		5,697	99.34	
Total rejected ballots		38	0.66	
Turnout		5,735	50.76	
Eligible voters		11,299		
Liberal gain from New Democratic		Swing		−5.52
Source(s) "Officially Nominated Candidates General Election 2021" (PDF). Elections Newfoundland and Labrador. "NL Election 2021 (Unofficial Results)".

2019 Newfoundland and Labrador general election
Party	Candidate	Votes	%	±%
New Democratic	Alison Coffin	2,699	43.48	-8.17
Liberal	George Murphy	2,072	33.38	-6.83
Progressive Conservative	David Porter	1,436	23.14	+15.01
Total valid votes		6,207	99.12	
Total rejected ballots		55	0.88	-0.13
Turnout		6,262	58.03	+1.23
Eligible voters		10,791		
New Democratic hold		Swing		-0.67
Source: Elections Newfoundland and Labrador

2015 Newfoundland and Labrador general election: Waterford Valley
Party	Candidate	Votes	%	±%
Liberal	Tom Osborne	3,588	65.93	–
New Democratic	Alison Coffin	1,062	19.52	–
Progressive Conservative	Alison Stoodley	792	14.55	–
Total valid votes		5,442	99.51	–
Total rejected ballots		27	0.49	–
Turnout		5,469	55.20	–
Eligible voters		9,907		
Liberal notional hold		Swing		–
Source: Elections Newfoundland and Labrador

2018 New Democratic Party of Newfoundland and Labrador leadership election
	First Ballot	
Candidate	Votes	Perc.
Gerry Rogers	971	67.0%
Alison Coffin	479	33.0%
Spoiled Ballots	0	0.0%
Totals	1450	100%
