= 1962 Newfoundland general election =

Canadian provincial election

- November 19, 1962

42 seats of the Newfoundland House of Assembly 22 seats were needed for a majority
- Turnout: 58.5% (▼10.8 pp)
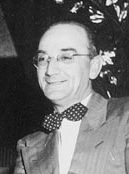
	First party	Second party
		PC
Leader	Joey Smallwood	James Greene
Party	Liberal	Progressive Conservative
Leader since	1949	1959
Leader's seat	Bonavista North (Note: Not the incumbent, but stood in this seat and won)	St. John's East
Last election	31	3
Seats won	34	7
Seat change	▲3	▲4
Popular vote	72,319	45,055
Percentage	58.7%	36.6%
Swing	▲0.7pp	▲11.3pp
Premier before election
Joey Smallwood
Liberal
Premier after election
Joey Smallwood
Liberal

The 1962 Newfoundland general election was held on 19 November 1962 to elect members of the 33rd General Assembly of Newfoundland. It was won by the Liberal party.

== Results ==
Party	Leader	1959	Seats won	Popular vote	(%)
Liberal	Joey Smallwood	31	34	72,319	58.7%
Progressive Conservative	James Greene	3	7	45,055	36.6%
New Democratic	Ed Finn	0 (Note: As the Newfoundland Democratic Party)	0	4,479	3.6%
United Newfoundland	Augustine Duffy	2	0	638	0.5%
Other		0	1	740	0.6%
Totals		36	42	123,990	100%

== Results by district ==
- Names in **boldface type** represent party leaders.
- † indicates that the incumbent did not run again.
- ‡ indicates that the incumbent ran in a different district.

=== St. John's ===
Electoral district	Candidates			Incumbent
Electoral district	Liberal	PC	United (historical)	Incumbent
St. John's Centre; 60.94% turnout	Joseph O'Driscoll; 1,512; 34.95%	Anthony Murphy; 2,176; 50.30%	Augustine Duffy; 638; 14.75%	Augustine Duffy
St. John's East; 63.71% turnout	James Higgins; 1,251; 38.60%	**James Greene**; 1,990; 61.40%		**James Greene**
St. John's East Extern; 66.37% turnout	James Fagan; 2,060; 43.71%	William Browne; 2,653; 56.29%		New district
St. John's North; 56.21% turnout	Geoffrey Carnell; 3,077; 60.88%	William Moss; 1,977; 39.12%		George Nightingale†
St. John's South; 60.96% turnout	John O'Dea; 2,809; 46.96%	Rex Renouf; 3,173; 53.04%		John O'Dea
St. John's West; 60.55% turnout	William Adams; 2,919; 51.58%	Harvey Cole; 2,740; 48.42%		**Joey Smallwood**‡ (ran in Bonavista North)

=== Conception Bay ===
Electoral district	Candidates		Incumbent
Electoral district	Liberal	PC	Incumbent
Bay de Verde; 64.69% turnout	William Saunders; 1,127; 56.92%	Charles Bursey; 853; 43.08%	New district
Bell Island; 71.12% turnout	Steve Neary; 1,814; 54.38%	Richard Greene; 1,522; 45.62%	Richard Greene
Carbonear; 50.63% turnout	George Clarke; 1,079; 62.73%	Walter Clarke; 641; 37.27%	George Clarke; Carbonear-Bay de Verde
Harbour Grace; 55.90% turnout	Claude Sheppard; 1,460; 57.53%	Harold Osborne; 1,078; 42.47%	Claude Sheppard
Harbour Main	Philip Lewis; 2,293; 29.40%	Albert Furey; 1,904; 24.42%	Philip Lewis
Harbour Main	Clifton Joy; 2,202; 28.24%	Terry Trainor; 1,399; 17.94%	Albert Furey
Port de Grave; 58.60% turnout	Eric Dawe; 1,774; 68.89%	Lloyd Stevens; 801; 31.11%	Llewellyn Strange†

=== Avalon Peninsula ===
Electoral district	Candidates			Incumbent
Electoral district	Liberal	PC	Other	Incumbent
Ferryland; 74.68% turnout	Myles Murray; 1,676; 59.06%	Otto Byrne; 1,162; 40.94%		Myles Murray
Placentia East; 63.17% turnout	Alain Frecker; 1,441; 54.98%	David Murphy; 868; 33.12%	William Patterson (Independent); 182; 6.94%	Alain Frecker
Placentia East; 63.17% turnout	Alain Frecker; 1,441; 54.98%	David Murphy; 868; 33.12%	Esau Thoms (NDP); 130; 4.96%	Alain Frecker
St. Mary's; 72.24% turnout	James M. McGrath; 1,118; 64.92%	John Halley; 604; 35.08%		James M. McGrath
Trinity South; 45.44% turnout	Uriah Strickland; 1,741; 62.76%	Edmund George; 1,033; 37.24%		Uriah Strickland

=== Eastern Newfoundland ===
Electoral district	Candidates			Incumbent
Electoral district	Liberal	PC	NDP	Incumbent
Bonavista North; 57.55% turnout	**Joey Smallwood**; 3,195; 81.15%	Douglas Parsons; 742; 18.85%		Edward Spencer‡ (ran in Fogo)
Bonavista South; 47.51% turnout	Rossy Barbour; 2,106; 62.57%	Robert Stead; 1,155; 34.31%	George Squire; 105; 3.12%	Rossy Barbour
Fogo	Edward Spencer; Won by acclamation			Isaac Mercer†
Trinity North; 46.98% turnout	Arthur Mifflin; 2,207; 66.96%	Whitfield Bannister; 1,089; 33.04%		Arthur Mifflin

=== Central Newfoundland ===
Electoral district	Candidates			Incumbent
Electoral district	Liberal	PC	NDP	Incumbent
Gander; 57.56% turnout	Beaton Abbott; 2,069; 52.92%	Harold Collins; 1,841; 47.08%		Beaton Abbott
Grand Falls; 61.14% turnout	Raymond Guy; 2,264; 48.50%	Ambrose Peddle; 2,404; 51.50%		Raymond Guy
Green Bay; 54.47% turnout	William Smallwood; 1,415; 59.06%		Kitchener Pritchett; 981; 40.94%	William Smallwood
Lewisporte; 58.12% turnout	Harold Starkes; 1,786; 60.77%	Guy Eveleigh; 1,153; 39.23%		New district
Twillingate; 53.39% turnout	Leslie Curtis; 1,691; 82.53%	Allan Young; 358; 17.47%		Leslie Curtis
White Bay South; 65.30% turnout	Frederick W. Rowe; 1,561; 79.56%	James Walsh; 401; 20.44%		Frederick W. Rowe

=== Southern Newfoundland ===
Electoral district	Candidates		Incumbent
Electoral district	Liberal	PC	Incumbent
Burgeo-La Poile; 60.58% turnout	Walter Hodder; 2,125; 70.86%	Allan Evans; 874; 29.14%	John Cheeseman‡ (ran in Hermitage)
Burin; 39.67% turnout	Eric Jones; 1,892; 86.27%	Harold Russell; 301; 13.73%	Eric Jones
Fortune Bay; 56.82% turnout	H.R.V. Earle; 1,552; 86.17%	Abram Godwin; 249; 13.83%	John Courage†; Fortune Bay-Hermitage
Hermitage	John Cheeseman; Won by acclamation		New district
Placentia West; 63.06% turnout	Patrick Canning; 1,948; 63.62%	Joseph Cheeseman; 1,114; 36.38%	Patrick Canning

=== Western Newfoundland ===
Electoral district	Candidates			Incumbent
Electoral district	Liberal	PC	NDP	Incumbent
Humber East; 69.57% turnout	John Forsey; 2,698; 46.82%	Noel Murphy; 3,064; 53.18%		John Forsey
Humber West; 61.94% turnout	Charles Ballam; 2,860; 52.19%		**Ed Finn**; 2,620; 47.81%	Charles Ballam
Port au Port; 69.39% turnout	Stephen Smith; 1,975; 54.38%	Berkley Evans; 1,657; 45.62%		Stephen Smith
St. Barbe North; 81.63% turnout	James Chalker; 1,340; 89.51%	George Randell; 157; 10.49%		James Chalker; St. Barbe
St. Barbe South; 73.34% turnout	Maxwell Lane; 929; 40.87%	William Smith; 1,102; 48.48%	Gerald P. Byrne; 242; 10.65%	New district
St. George's; 68.71% turnout	William Keough; 1,907; 64.95%	John Martin; 1,029; 35.05%		William Keough
White Bay North; 64.01% turnout	Walter Carter; 2,062; 89.69%	Garland Patey; 237; 10.31%		Maxwell Lane‡ (ran in St. Barbe South)

=== Labrador ===
Electoral district	Candidates			Incumbent
Electoral district	Liberal	PC	Other	Incumbent
Labrador North; 44.23% turnout	Earl Winsor; 860; 75.97%	Arthur Hale; 272; 24.03%		Earl Winsor
Labrador South	Gerald Hill; Won by acclamation			Gerald Hill
Labrador West; 86.38% turnout	Edward Henley; 389; 41.08%		Charles Devine (Independent); 558; 58.92%	New district
