= Gerry Panting =

Gerald (Gerry) Ernest Panting (May 17, 1927 —December 3, 1998) was a Memorial University of Newfoundland professor specializing in maritime history, and leader of the Newfoundland NDP from 1974 to 1977.

Panting was the longtime head of the department of history at Memorial University, until 1976, and founder of the university's Maritime History Group and was the author of texts on maritime shipping and shipbuilding.

He ran for the Newfoundland and Labrador NDP provincially five times, coming in a strong second in the 1975 Newfoundland general election and ran in one federal election, running in Gander—Twillingate in the 1984 Canadian federal election. A dedicated party builder, Panting remained active within the NDP until his death in 1998.

His parents were Ernie Panting, a truck driver, and Violet May Panting and had two sisters. Before entering academia, he worked in the accounting office of Canada Packers and as a payroll officer for the Department of National Defence in Churchill, Manitoba. He met Margaret Lyttle in 1948, later marrying her. Panting earned a Masters of Arts degree from United College (now the University of Winnipeg) after which he returned to Newfoundland in 1959 to lecture at Memorial University. He became head of the history department, a position he held until 1976, and oversaw its expansion from five to 25 professors. He co-founded the Maritime History Group which would develop the world's largest maritime archive. He continued teaching at the university until his retirement in 1994, when he was diagnosed with bowel cancer. He died from the disease in 1997.

His son, Sean Panting, is an actor who ran for the Newfoundland NDP in 2015.
