= Fish, Food and Allied Workers Union =

Canadian trade union

- Abbreviation: FFAW
- Formation: 1970
- Type: Trade union
- Headquarters: St. John's, Newfoundland and Labrador, Canada
- Location: Newfoundland and Labrador, Canada
- Members: 15,000
- President: Dwan Street
- Affiliations: Unifor
- Website: ffaw.ca
- Formerly called: Northern Fishermen's Union (1970–1971); Newfoundland Fishermen, Food and Allied Workers Union (1971–?)

The Fish, Food and Allied Workers Union (FFAW) is a trade union in Newfoundland and Labrador that represents 14,000 workers. Most of the members are in the fishing industry but the FFAW also has organized workers in the hospitality, brewing, metal fabrication, and oil industries in the province. The FFAW is the largest private-sector union in Newfoundland and is affiliated with Unifor.

== History ==
The FFAW was organized in 1970 as the Fishermen's Union by Father Desmond McGrath and Richard Cashin in order to organize fishplant workers, who, at the time, were exempt from the province's minimum wage and were thus paid sub-minimum wages. In 1971 the union led a recognition strike in Burgeo after a majority of workers there signed union cards but the plant owner refused to recognize the union. After a strike lasting several months the plant was nationalized by the provincial government and a collective bargaining agreement was signed by it and the union. In 1971, as the result of pressure from the FFAW Newfoundland became the first Canadian province to recognize the collective bargaining rights of fishery workers when the Newfoundland House of Assembly passed the Fishing Industry Collective Bargaining Act which gave inshore fishers the right to negotiate their prices.

After several more strikes, most notably against Fishery Products, trawling companies abandoned their insistence on unilaterally setting the price of fish and agreed to negotiate prices with fishermen.

In 1979, under Cashin's leadership, the union established the Labrador Fishermen’s Union Shrimp Company as a worker co-operative. It won two fishing licences from the federal government and changed the work lives of fishermen on the Labrador coast.

By 1977, the union was negotiating province-wide master contracts with the industry as a whole represented by the Fisheries Association of Newfoundland and Labrador. The union also waged a successful campaign for workers compensation in the fishing industry with a law being passed by the House of Assembly in 1981.

In 1987, the union disaffiliated from the United Food and Commercial Workers and joined the Canadian Auto Workers. In 2012 the Canadian Auto Workers merged with Communications, Energy and Paperworkers Union of Canada to form Unifor.

== Elected Leadership ==
In 1994, after 23 years as president, Richard Cashin stepped down and was succeeded by Earle McCurdy. McCurdy was president from 1994 to 2014. His most notable act was helping to manage Canada's fishing dispute with the European Union, known as the Turbot War.

McCurdy was succeeded by Keith Sullivan in 2014 during a midterm election of joint councils.

Sullivan resigned as president in December 2022.

In January 2023, Greg Pretty was elected by joint-council to finish the remainder of the 3-year term. Pretty did not seek re-election during the general election process in 2024.

In 2024, the election of a new 16-member executive board resulted in the majority of rank and file voters selecting Dwan Street as the first woman president of the union.

== Failed Union Raid ==
In 2016, former NDP MP Ryan Cleary started efforts to organize a new union of fish harvesters, to be called the Federation of Independent Seafood Harvesters, or FISH-NL, as a rival to the Fish, Food and Allied Workers union. Cleary travelled throughout the province signing up members for union certification, their application for union recognition was considered by the Labour Relations Board from 2016 to 2018. On September 28, 2018, the Labour Relations Board ruled that FISH-NL did not have enough support to trigger a ratification vote. On December 3, 2019, Cleary announced the dissolution of FISH-NL after it failed to gain the necessary 4,000 signatures after a second membership drive to trigger a ratification vote.

== See also ==
- Fishermen's Protective Union
- United Fishermen and Allied Workers' Union
