= St. John's East-Quidi Vidi =

Provincial electoral district in Newfoundland and Labrador, Canada

Newfoundland and Labrador electoral district
- Location in the St. John's area

Provincial electoral district
- Legislature: Newfoundland and Labrador House of Assembly
MHA
Sheilagh O'Leary
New Democratic
- District created: 2015
- First contested: 2015
- Last contested: 2025

Demographics
- Population (2011): 14,443
- Electors (2015): 10,459
- Area (km²): 10
- Census division: Division No. 1
- Census subdivision: St. John's (part)

St. John's East-Quidi Vidi is a provincial electoral district in Newfoundland and Labrador, Canada. In 2016 there were 14,381 people living in the district.

St. John's East-Quidi Vidi includes part of the city of St. John's. The district was created following the 2015 electoral districts boundaries review. The district includes parts of the former districts of St. John's East, Signal Hill-Quidi Vidi and St. John's Centre.

The district is considered fairly safe for the NDP and was represented by Newfoundland and Labrador NDP leader Alison Coffin until the 2021 election, when she was defeated by Liberal John Abbott. Abbott announced on June 11, 2025, that he would step down to resolve a legal battle resulting from the 2021 election. On August 15, 2025, Abbott resigned. In the 2025 election, St. John's Deputy Mayor and NDP candidate Sheilagh O'Leary was elected.

== Members of the House of Assembly ==
The district has elected the following members of the House of Assembly:

Assembly	Years	Member	Party
Riding created from St. John's East, Signal Hill-Quidi Vidi, and St. John's Centre.
48th	2015–2019	Lorraine Michael	New Democratic
49th	2019–2021	Alison Coffin	New Democratic
50th	2021–2025	John Abbott	Liberal
51st	2025–present	Sheilagh O'Leary	New Democratic

== Election results ==
Graph of election results (minor parties that never got 2% of the vote or did not run consistently are omitted) View source data.

2025 Newfoundland and Labrador general election
Party	Candidate	Votes	%	±%
New Democratic	Sheilagh O'Leary	2,886	49.90	+7.87
Liberal	John Whelan	2,458	42.50	-0.45
Progressive Conservative	Alex Cepovski	440	7.61	-7.42
Total valid votes		5,784	99.4	
Total rejected ballots		32	0.55	
Turnout		5,816	52.75	
Eligible voters		11,024		
New Democratic gain from Liberal		Swing		+4.17

2021 Newfoundland and Labrador general election
Party	Candidate	Votes	%	±%
Liberal	John Abbott	2,447	42.95	+9.57
New Democratic	Alison Coffin	2,394	42.02	−1.46
Progressive Conservative	Vaughn Hammond	856	15.03	−8.11
Total valid votes		5,697	99.34	
Total rejected ballots		38	0.66	
Turnout		5,735	50.76	
Eligible voters		11,299		
Liberal gain from New Democratic		Swing		−5.52
Source(s) "Officially Nominated Candidates General Election 2021" (PDF). Elections Newfoundland and Labrador. "NL Election 2021 (Unofficial Results)".

2019 Newfoundland and Labrador general election
Party	Candidate	Votes	%	±%
New Democratic	Alison Coffin	2,699	43.48	−8.17
Liberal	George Murphy	2,072	33.38	−6.83
Progressive Conservative	David Porter	1,436	23.14	+15.01
Total valid votes		6,207	99.12	
Total rejected ballots		55	0.88	−0.13
Turnout		6,262	58.03	+1.23
Eligible voters		10,791		
New Democratic hold		Swing		−0.67
Source: Elections Newfoundland and Labrador

2015 Newfoundland and Labrador general election
Party	Candidate	Votes	%
New Democratic	Lorraine Michael	3,038	51.66
Liberal	Paul Antle	2,365	40.21
Progressive Conservative	Joshua Collier	478	8.13
Total valid votes		5,881	98.99
Total rejected ballots		60	1.01
Turnout		5,941	56.80
Eligible voters		10,459	
Source: Elections Newfoundland and Labrador

== See also ==
- List of Newfoundland and Labrador provincial electoral districts
- Canadian provincial electoral districts
