= Jim Dinn =

Canadian politician

Jim Dinn MHA
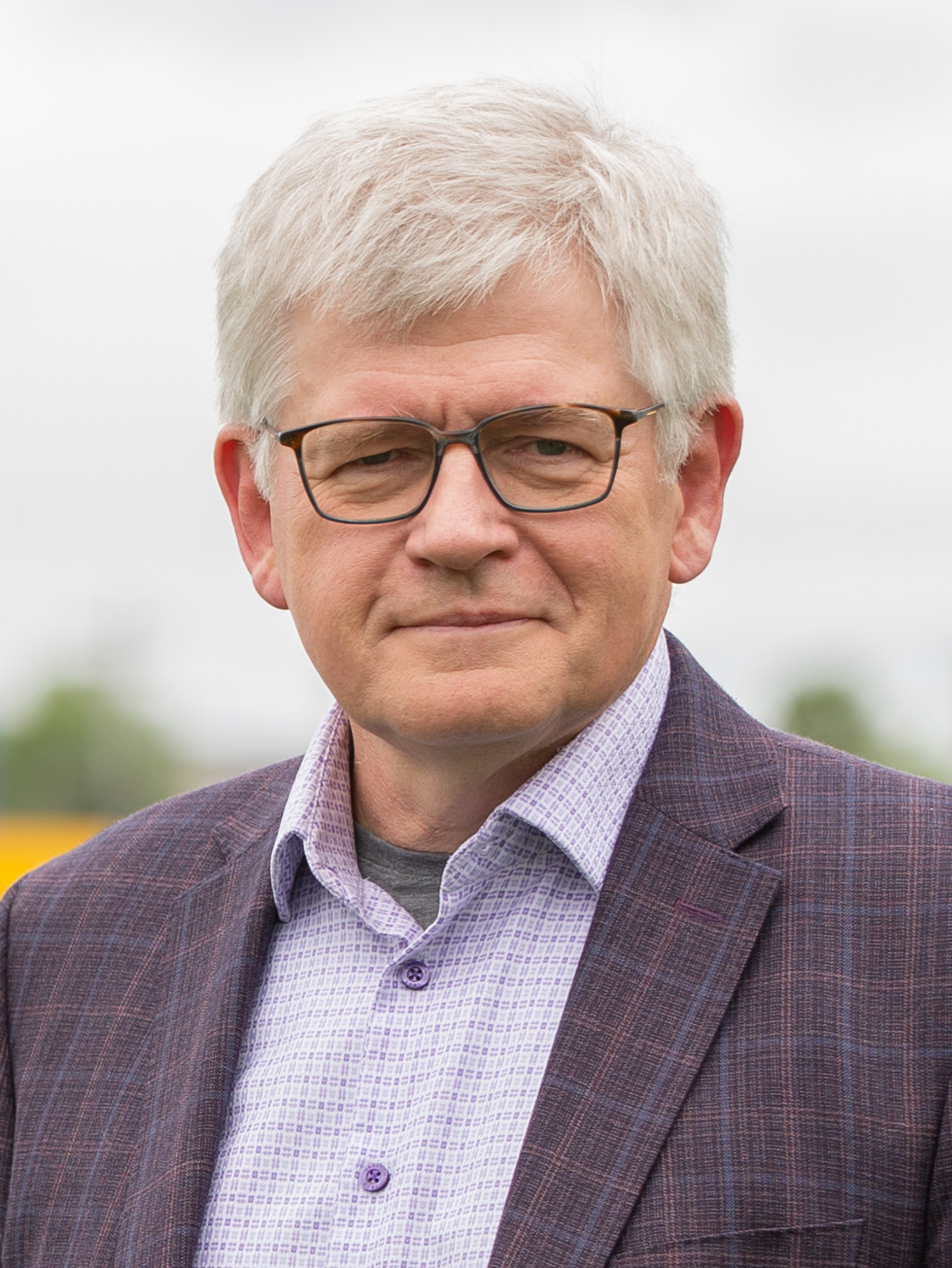

Leader of the Newfoundland and Labrador New Democratic Party
- Incumbent
- Assumed office March 28, 2023; Interim: October 19, 2021 – March 28, 2023
- Preceded by: Alison Coffin

House Leader of the Newfoundland and Labrador New Democratic Party
- In office April 2021 – October 19, 2021
- Succeeded by: Jordan Brown

Member of the Newfoundland and Labrador House of Assembly for St. John's Centre
- Incumbent
- Assumed office May 16, 2019
- Preceded by: Gerry Rogers

President of the Newfoundland and Labrador Teachers’ Association
- In office 2013–2017
- Preceded by: Lily B. Cole
- Succeeded by: Dean Ingram

President of the Salmonid Association of Eastern Newfoundland
- In office 2008–2018
- Succeeded by: Jim McCarthy

Personal details
- Born: c. 1960 (age 65–66) St. John's, Newfoundland and Labrador, Canada
- Party: New Democratic Party
- Spouse: Michelle
- Relations: Paul Dinn (brother)
- Children: 3
- Education: Memorial University of Newfoundland (BA, B.Ed); Mount Saint Vincent University (M.Ed)
- Occupation: Teacher

James Gerard Dinn (born c. 1960) is a Canadian politician who was elected to the Newfoundland and Labrador House of Assembly in the 2019 provincial election. He represents the electoral district of St. John's Centre as a member of the Newfoundland and Labrador New Democratic Party. He was re-elected in the 2021 and 2025 provincial elections.

Dinn served as president of the Newfoundland and Labrador Teachers’ Association (2013–2017). He had also served on the executive board of the Canadian Teachers' Federation. Dinn also served as president of the Salmonid Association of Eastern Newfoundland. He did his teaching internship at Netteswell Comprehensive School in England and later taught at Holy Heart of Mary Regional High School.

== Political career ==
Dinn won the NDP nomination in St. John's Centre ahead of the 2019 election after incumbent MHA Gerry Rogers opted not to seek re-elected. He defeated his nearest opponent, PC candidate and former city councilor Jonathan Galgay, by more than 900 votes. Dinn earned the highest vote share of any NDP candidate.

In November 2019, Jim Dinn and his brother, fellow MHA Paul Dinn, both endorsed a Liberal proposal to use highway cameras to reduce speeding. Paul Dinn spoke about their brother Mike who was killed in 2009 while cycling.

=== Leader of the NDP (2021–present) ===
==== Interim leader (2021–2023) ====
On October 19, 2021, he was named interim leader of the New Democratic Party, following the resignation of Alison Coffin. In 2022, the NDP caucus grew after former PC MHA Lela Evans joined the party.

Dinn and his party were the only political party in Newfoundland and Labrador that opposed the Bay du Nord offshore oil project and instead called for the province to reduce its reliance on fossil fuels. Following the announcement that the project had been approved by the federal government in April 2022, Dinn called it "bittersweet". He praised the project for the benefits that it would provide for many workers and their families while also claiming that the provincial and federal governments were ignoring the impacts of climate change.

In March 2022, Dinn praised the confidence and supply agreement between the federal NDP and the Liberal Party of Canada.

==== Permanent leader (2023–present) ====
Dinn initially rejected the possibility of running for the role of NDP leader, instead preferring to only serve in an interim capacity. However, Dinn expressed interest in running for permanent leadership in early 2023.

On February 16, 2023, Dinn announced that he would run for the role of permanent leader.

On March 28, 2023, Dinn was acclaimed as permanent leader after the nomination deadline passed with no other candidates.

Dinn was re-elected in the 2025 Newfoundland and Labrador general election.

On September 17, 2026, Dinn voted against the Churchill Falls Definitive Cooperation and Implementation Agreement (DCIA) in the House of Assembly along with the Liberal caucus and Independent MHA Keith Russell.

On September 26, 2026, NL NDP delegates at their policy convention voted against a leadership convention with leader Dinn receiving 89% support.

== Electoral results ==
2025 Newfoundland and Labrador general election: St. John's Centre
| Party | Candidate | Votes | % | ±% |
|---|---|---|---|---|
| New Democratic | Jim Dinn | 2,398 | 62.16 | +9.78 |
| Liberal | Gemma Hickey | 1,003 | 26.00 | -7.60 |
| Progressive Conservative | Ben Duggan | 457 | 11.85 | -2.18 |
| Total valid votes | | 3,858 | 99.4 | |
| Total rejected ballots | | 23 | 0.05 | |
| Turnout | | 3,881 | 38.45 | |
| Eligible voters | | 9,836 | | |
| New Democratic hold | | Swing | | +8.69 |

2021 Newfoundland and Labrador general election: St. John's Centre
| Party | Candidate | Votes | % | ±% |
|---|---|---|---|---|
| New Democratic | Jim Dinn | 1,991 | 52.38 | +5.45 |
| Liberal | Gemma Hickey | 1,277 | 33.60 | +8.06 |
| Progressive Conservative | Robyn LeGrow | 533 | 14.02 | -13.51 |
| Total valid votes | | 3,801 | 99.01 | |
| Total rejected ballots | | 38 | 0.99 | |
| Turnout | | 3,839 | 38.92 | |
| Eligible voters | | 9,864 | | |
| New Democratic hold | | Swing | | -1.30 |
Source(s) "Officially Nominated Candidates General Election 2021" (PDF). Elections Newfoundland and Labrador. "NL Election 2021 (Unofficial Results)".
