= Earle McCurdy =

Canadian politician (born 1950)

Leader of the Newfoundland and Labrador New Democratic Party
- In office March 7, 2015 – September 28, 2017
- Preceded by: Lorraine Michael
- Succeeded by: Lorraine Michael (interim)

Personal details
- Born: 1950 (age 75–76) Halifax, Nova Scotia, Canada
- Party: New Democratic Party
- Spouse: Charlotte Strong
- Education: Memorial University of Newfoundland (B.A.)
- Occupation: Journalist

Earle McCurdy (born 1950) is a Canadian labour leader and politician from Newfoundland and Labrador. He was the leader of the Newfoundland and Labrador New Democratic Party from 2015 to 2017. McCurdy was involved with the Fish, Food and Allied Workers Union before entering politics, serving as their secretary treasurer from 1980 to 1993 and as their president from 1993 to 2014.

== Background ==
McCurdy was born in Halifax, Nova Scotia in 1950 as the son of Sherburne McCurdy, an educator who served as president of the Canadian Teachers' Federation, and Elizabeth (née Jefferson). He grew up in St. John's, Newfoundland and attended Prince of Wales Collegiate where his father had been the principal. He obtained his Bachelor of Arts from Memorial University of Newfoundland in 1972. After graduation, he worked as a labour reporter for The Evening Telegram, but left the paper in 1977 to become involved with the Fish, Food and Allied Workers Union (FFAW) as the editor for their newsletter, the Union Forum. He became the organization's president in 1993, succeeding founding president Richard Cashin.

McCurdy presided as the FFAW union president during Canada's fishing dispute with the European Union, which became known as the Turbot War.

== New Democratic Party leader (2015–2017) ==
McCurdy was elected leader of the Newfoundland and Labrador NDP at the party's leadership convention held March 7, 2015, defeating two other contenders with 68% support on the first ballot. In the 2015 provincial election, McCurdy failed to win a seat in the House of Assembly and was defeated by Siobhán Coady by nearly 1000 votes.

On June 11, 2016, McCurdy's leadership was reaffirmed at the party's provincial convention with the support of 91.6% of delegates.

On September 19, 2017, McCurdy announced his resignation as Leader, effective September 30, 2017. His resignation came after Steve Kent announced he would resign his seat of Mount Pearl North where McCurdy resided but which was unlikely to be winnable for the NDP. Following McCurdy's resignation, MHA and former leader Lorraine Michael was named interim leader.

== Electoral record ==
St. John's West - 2015 Newfoundland and Labrador general election
Party	Candidate	Votes	%	±%
Liberal	Siobhán Coady	2,342	46.0	
New Democratic	Earle McCurdy	1,384	27.2	
Progressive Conservative	Dan Crummell	1,364	26.8	

NL NDP Leadership Election, 2015
	First Ballot	
Candidate	Votes	Perc.
Earle McCurdy	889	68.5%
Mike Goosney	299	23.0%
Chris Bruce	110	8.5%
Spoiled Ballots	0	0.00%
Totals	1298	100%
