= Gerry Rogers =

Canadian politician (born 1956)

Leader of the Newfoundland and Labrador New Democratic Party
- In office April 8, 2018 – March 5, 2019
- Preceded by: Lorraine Michael
- Succeeded by: Alison Coffin

Member of the Newfoundland and Labrador House of Assembly for St. John's Centre
- In office October 27, 2011 – April 17, 2019
- Preceded by: Shawn Skinner
- Succeeded by: Jim Dinn

Personal details
- Born: 1956 (age 69–70) Corner Brook, Newfoundland, Canada
- Party: New Democratic
- Spouse: Peg Norman (m. 2017)
- Occupation: documentary filmmaker, social worker

Gerry Rogers (born 1956) is a Canadian documentary filmmaker and politician. She was leader of the Newfoundland and Labrador New Democratic Party from 2018 until 2019. She served in the Newfoundland and Labrador House of Assembly as NDP MHA for the electoral district of St. John’s Centre from 2011 to 2019. She became the party's leader after winning the April 2018 leadership election. She resigned as party leader prior to the 2019 provincial election and did not seek re-election.

== Background ==
Rogers was born in Corner Brook, Newfoundland, to Leo Rogers from St. John's and Philomena Coles from Port Saunders. Leo joined the army, and the family moved to Montreal, then to Toronto, Winnipeg and Germany. They eventually returned to St. John’s in 1979, where Rogers completed a bachelor of social work at Memorial University of Newfoundland. Rogers worked at the St. John’s Women’s Centre, where she helped establish the first transition house for battered women.

In 1982, she moved to Montreal to make documentary films at the National Film Board's Studio D, the only state funded women’s filmmaking unit in the world. Rogers made films with Studio D for 10 years. In 1992, she returned to St. John’s and founded Augusta Productions, and directed several international award-winning films including My Left Breast, a documentary about her own battle with breast cancer. Augusta Productions produces low-budget, POV, activist documentaries bringing viewers to the hearts and lives of people from every nook and cranny of society. The films work to uncover the joy and strength and resilience of people in difficult situations, celebrating and broadcasting their voices.

Openly lesbian, Rogers is the partner of social worker and businessperson Peg Norman. In honour of her role as a significant builder of LGBT culture and history in Canada, a portrait of Rogers by artist Claire Priddle was added to the Canadian Lesbian and Gay Archives' National Portrait Collection in 2003.

Rogers became a marriage commissioner in 2005 in response to the many marriage commissioners who resigned after being told that they must perform same-sex marriages or resign from their positions.

== Politics ==
Rogers was elected to the Newfoundland and Labrador House of Assembly in the 2011 provincial election, representing the district of St. John’s Centre as a member of the New Democratic Party. She was the first openly gay politician ever elected to the provincial legislature. She was re-elected in the 2015 provincial election.

In 2017, Rogers announced her intentions to run for leader of the provincial NDP, following the resignation of Earle McCurdy. At the leadership convention on April 8, 2018, Rogers was elected leader with two-thirds of the vote. Rogers is the first openly LGBT person to lead a political party in Newfoundland and Labrador.

On February 12, 2019, Rogers announced she would be stepping down as leader and not seeking re-election in Newfoundland's upcoming election. On March 5, 2019, Alison Coffin was acclaimed as NDP leader. Rogers retired from the House of Assembly at its dissolution for the 2019 provincial election, which was held on May 16.

== Post-politics ==
Rogers resided in Broad Cove after leaving politics.

In August 2025, Rogers was among thousands displace amid the Conception Bay North wildfire. In 2026, Rogers endorsed Avi Lewis in that year's federal NDP leadership race.

== Electoral record ==
2015 Newfoundland and Labrador general election
Party	Candidate	Votes	%	±%
New Democratic	Gerry Rogers	2195		
Liberal	Lynn Sullivan	1923		
Progressive Conservative	Kathie Hicks	490		
Total valid votes				

2011 Newfoundland and Labrador general election
Party	Candidate	Votes	%	±%
NDP	Gerry Rogers	2,569	54.44	
Progressive Conservative	Shawn Skinner	2,041	43.25	
Liberal	Carly Bigelow	109	2.31	

== Films ==
- 2009 Ferron: Girl on a Road
- 2000 My Left Breast
- 1997 Kathleen Shannon: On Film, Feminism and Other Dreams
- 1994 The Vienna Tribunal
- 1991 Safer for Women, Safer for Everyone — Director (Documentary, Council of Ontario Universities)
- 1990 After the Montreal Massacre
- 1988 Faithful Women Assistant — Director (7 x 1 hour doc series, NFB/VISION TV)
- 1987 To a Safer Place — Producer (Documentary Series, NFB)
- 1986-87 Children of War Double voix/First Take/Double Take Thin Dreams Beyond Memory/Nouvelle memoire

Les enfants de la guerre

— Program Producer (Documentaries, NFB)

- 1987 The Impossible Takes A Little Longer
- 1987 Le vent dans les voiles
- 1987 Doctor, Lawyer, Indian Chief
- 1987 L’Avenir entre nos mains — Program Producer (Documentaries, NFB)
- 1986 Sylvie’s Story
- 1986 A Safe Distance
- 1986 Si jamais tu pars
- 1986 J’Osais pas rien dire
- 1986 Fallait que ca change — Program Producer/(Documentaries, NFB)
- 1984 Head Start: Meeting the Computer Challenge
- 1984 L’Ordinateur en tete — Program Producer (Documentaries, NFB)
- 1983 Attention Women At Work
- 1983 Femmes au travail — Program Producer (Documentaries, NFB)
- 1983 Moving On — Program Producer/Producer (Documentaries NFB)

=== Themes ===
Breast Cancer, Feminism, LGBTQ+ Community, LGBTQ+ Activism, Violence Against Women.

=== Frequent collaborators ===
Kathleen Shannon, Ginny Stikeman, Terre Nash, Nicole Hubert.

=== Awards and honours ===
Portrait in the Canadian Lesbian and Gay Archives’ national Portrait collection, Gemini Award for My Left Breast (2001), Gold at HotDocs for My Left Breast

- 2001, Won Gemini Award for 'Best History/Biography Documentary Program'
- 2001, Won 'Audience Award' at Dallas OUT TAKES Lesbian and Gay Film Festival
- 2001, Won 'Best Documentary' at Dallas OUT TAKES Lesbian and Gay Film Festival
- 2001, Won 'Outstanding Direction' at Dallas OUT TAKES Lesbian and Gay Film Festival
- 2001, Won 'Best Canadian Film or Video' at Inside Out Film and Video Festival
- 2002, Won Audience Award for 'Best Documentary Film' at Boulder Gay and Lesbian Film Festival
- Leadership for Women’s Health in Atlantic Canada
- Rogers was a 1995 Recipient of the CTV Fellowship for Banff and a resident of the Canadian Film Centre, Writing and Producing for TV program.
- 1999, completed the Women In The Director’s Chair program in Banff.

== See also ==
- List of female film and television directors
- List of lesbian filmmakers
- List of LGBT-related films directed by women
