= Lorraine Michael =

Canadian politician (born 1943)

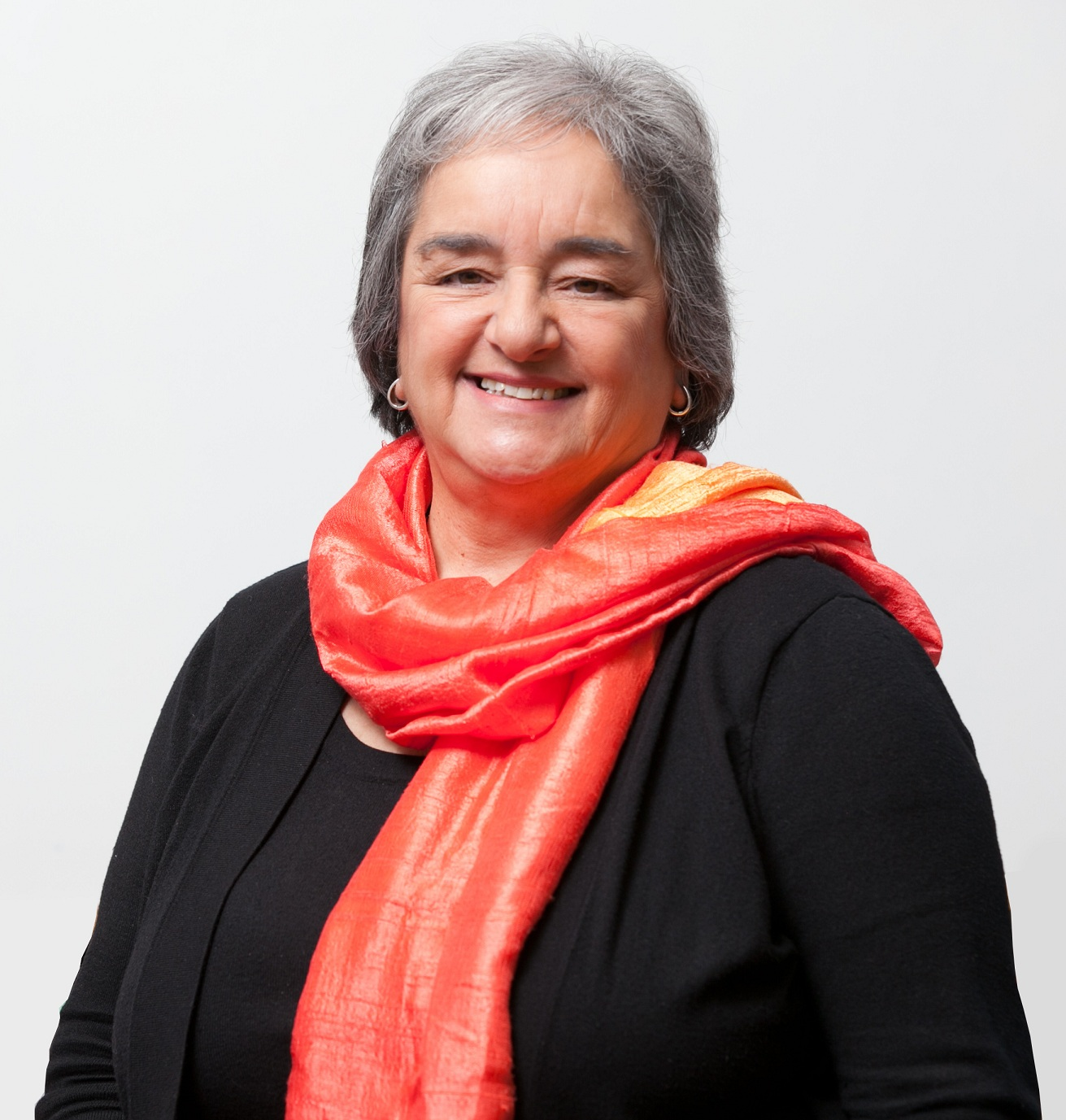

Member of the Newfoundland and Labrador House of Assembly for St. John's East-Quidi Vidi Signal Hill-Quidi Vidi (2006-2015)
- In office November 1, 2006 – April 17, 2019
- Preceded by: Jack Harris
- Succeeded by: Alison Coffin

Leader of the Newfoundland and Labrador New Democratic Party
- In office May 28, 2006 – March 7, 2015
- Preceded by: Jack Harris
- Succeeded by: Earle McCurdy
- In office September 28, 2017 – April 8, 2018 (Note: As interim leader)
- Preceded by: Earle McCurdy
- Succeeded by: Gerry Rogers

Personal details
- Born: March 27, 1943 (age 83) St. John's, Newfoundland
- Party: New Democratic Party
- Education: University of Toronto; Memorial University of Newfoundland
- Occupation: Roman Catholic Nun, Teacher, School Administrator, Social Activist

Lorraine Michael (born March 27, 1943) is a social-democratic Canadian politician from Newfoundland and Labrador, Canada. From May 2006 until March 2015, Michael was the leader of the Newfoundland and Labrador New Democratic Party (NDP). She is a former nun, teacher, and social activist.

On November 1, 2006, she was elected Member of the House of Assembly (MHA) for the district of Signal Hill-Quidi Vidi, and re-elected the following year in the provincial election, and again in 2011. On January 6, 2015, Michael announced her resignation of leader of the NDP following a leadership election which took place on March 7, 2015. Michael successfully contested the 2015 provincial election in the district of St. John's East-Quidi Vidi. Following the resignation of her successor as NDP leader, Earle McCurdy, Michael served as interim leader of the NDP from 2017 until 2018. She did not re-offer at the May 16, 2019 provincial election and retired from the legislature.

== Background and personal life ==
Michael was born on March 27, 1943, to a Lebanese-Newfoundland family in St. John's, Dominion of Newfoundland. Michael was a nun until she left the Roman Catholic Church in 1993 over conflicts with the local Archdiocese, including the Archdiocese's handling of an alleged sexual assault case. She has completed degrees at Memorial University of Newfoundland and the University of Toronto. She started her career as a high school teacher on Bell Island, and was a junior high school principal and teacher in Baie Verte, the Codroy Valley, on the Burin Peninsula, and in St. John's.

Michael has been a social activist and a feminist activist in Canada and Newfoundland and Labrador, as well as internationally. After leaving the teaching profession, she became Director of the Office of Social Action in St. John's where she worked on a number of coalitions for social justice, both regionally and nationally. In later years, while working with the Toronto-based Ecumenical Coalition for Economic Justice (ECEJ), she spoke on the subject of economic globalization in Mexico, Chile, and Zimbabwe. She has also worked with the Women and Work Committee of the National Action Committee on the Status of Women and served for a period as the organization's Interim Executive Director.

Prior to her election as NDP leader, she was Executive Director of the Women in Resource Development Committee, consulting with industry, labour, government, and educators to achieve employment equity in natural resource development sectors in Newfoundland and Labrador. This work was an extension of her earlier work in Labrador as the Innu Nation nominee on the Voisey's Bay environmental assessment panel from 1997 to 1999.

In 2016, Michael announced that she had been treated for breast cancer earlier in the year.

Michael is a member of the Newfoundland Symphony Orchestra.

== Provincial politics ==
=== Leadership (2006-2015) ===
On March 28, 2006, Michael announced she was seeking the leadership of the New Democratic Party of Newfoundland and Labrador, following the resignation of leader Jack Harris. At the leadership convention on May 28, 2006, Michael defeated writer Nina Patey with a 107–5 vote count.

On November 1, 2006 she was elected in a by-election in the district of Signal Hill-Quidi Vidi defeating Progressive Conservative candidate Jerome Kennedy. Her campaign also received support from federal NDP leader, Jack Layton who visited the district to campaign for Michael.

In March 2007, New Democrat Randy Collins resigned as MHA for Labrador West after being named in the province's constituency allowance scandal. Michael was unsuccessful in holding the district for the NDP, losing to Progressive Conservative candidate Jim Baker. The party faced several mishaps during the campaign, notably the decision of their presumed candidate, Karen Oldford, to run for the Liberals and the decision by the president of the United Steelworkers union local at Wabush Mines to endorse the Labrador Party instead of the NDP.

=== 2007 provincial election ===
In the 2007 Newfoundland and Labrador general election the party ran candidates in 36 of the 48 electoral districts. Due to a lack of funds, Michael spent most of her time campaigning in the St. John's Metropolitan Area. She did make campaign stops in Burin-Placentia West, central Newfoundland and Western Labrador. Michael defeated her Progressive Conservative opponent Maria Afonso by a 17% margin but the party was unable to make any other gains throughout the province.

=== 2011 provincial election ===
In the 2011 general election the Progressive Conservatives won their third straight majority government. The New Democrats placed second in the popular vote and won a record number of five seats. Despite this they finished third behind the Liberal Party in seats and the Liberals remained the Official Opposition.

=== Efforts as leader ===
In March 2010, she called on government to immediately put a permanent air ambulance in western Labrador following a fatal incident in which a 56-year-old man died while waiting for an air ambulance to arrive. In May 2010, she called for the House of Assembly to urge government to increase funding to help problem gamblers and establish a new plan for reduction leading to elimination of VLTs. She has also supported a ban on bottled water in government offices. In July 2010, she criticized the Williams Government's for carelessness after a mistake from the Department of Education resulted in approximately 6,500 high school students from across the province receiving the wrong marks, or no marks on their transcripts.

=== Public opinion ===
During the majority of time as leader, Michael and her party's support remained under 10 percent in the polls. Under her leadership the party's popularity was consistent with where they had been in public opinion over the past 20 years. After the 2011 federal election in which the New Democratic Party overtook the Liberals as the Official Opposition, support for Michael and the provincial NDP surged in a Corporate Research Associates (CRA) poll. On June 7, 2011, a poll showed that the party's support since March 2011, had risen from eight percent to 20 percent. This placed them in a statistical tie with the Liberal Party who were at 22 percent. Both parties however trailed the Progressive Conservatives (PC) who had the support of 57 percent. Michael's own popularity spiked, since the previous poll by CRA her popularity had risen from five percent to 14 percent. This placed her just behind Liberal leader Yvonne Jones who was at 16 percent, Premier Kathy Dunderdale had the support of 51 percent. By August 2011, Michael and her New Democratic Party had over taken the Liberal Party to place second behind the Progressive Conservatives. A CRA poll conducted throughout August showed that NDP support rose to 24%, while the Liberals remained at 20% and the PC Party fell slightly to 54%. While 50% thought Dunderdale was the best choice for premier, 17% of thought Michael was the best choice compared to 16% for new Liberal leader Kevin Aylward.

=== Caucus revolt and 2015-2019 ===
On October 21, 2013, it was revealed that Michael had received a letter from her caucus over the previous weekend calling for a leadership election to be held in 2014. The caucus felt that without renewal in the party they would have trouble attracting quality candidates and public support in the 2015 election. In an interview with the Canadian Broadcasting Corporation (CBC), Michael said she was shocked by the letter and felt betrayed by her caucus. Michael said she planned to sit down with her caucus before making a decision on what to do.

The letter led to a public fight within the NDP, particularly among the caucus. Both Gerry Rogers and George Murphy said they regretted sending the letter and supported Michael, while Dale Kirby and Chris Mitchelmore stood behind what they had written in the letter. Following the caucus meeting Michael agreed to having a vote on her leadership at the next annual general meeting of the party. Both Kirby and Mitchelmore later announced they were leaving the caucus to sit as Independent MHAs, and both men joined the Liberal Party in February 2014. The dispute over Michael's leadership also led to members of the provincial executive to resign. In May 2014 a party convention reaffirmed her leadership with the support of 75% of delegates. Michael announced on January 6, 2015, that she is stepping down as party leader after the party performed poorly in four by-elections, but will not be stepping down as an MHA. She was succeeded by Earle McCurdy following a leadership election on March 7, 2015. Michael successfully contested the 2015 provincial election in the district of St. John's East-Quidi Vidi. She subsequently served as NDP House Leader in the following parliamentary sessions as Earle McCurdy did not win his seat.

Following the resignation of her successor as NDP leader, Earle McCurdy, Michael was appointed interim leader of the NDP in 2017. She served as interim leader until the election of MHA Gerry Rogers as leader in April 2018. She declined to run for re-election in the 2019 election in order to give party leader Alison Coffin a chance to win a seat.

In 2026, Michael endorsed Avi Lewis in that year's federal NDP leadership race.

== Electoral history ==
2015 Newfoundland and Labrador general election: St. John's East-Quidi Vidi
Party	Candidate	Votes	%
New Democratic	Lorraine Michael	3,038	51.6
Liberal	Paul Antle	2,365	40.2
Progressive Conservative	Joshua Collier	478	8.1
Total valid votes			

2011 Newfoundland and Labrador general election: Signal Hill-Quidi Vidi
Party	Candidate	Votes	%	±%
New Democratic	Lorraine Michael	3,239	65.28	+8.48
Progressive Conservative	John Noseworthy	1,550	31.24	-8.36
Liberal	Drew Brown	173	3.49	-0.11
Total valid votes				

2007 Newfoundland and Labrador general election: Signal Hill-Quidi Vidi
Party	Candidate	Votes	%	±%
New Democratic	Lorraine Michael	3,062	56.8	+1.6
Progressive Conservative	Maria Afonso	2,135	39.6	-5.2
Liberal	Maura Beam	196	3.6	+3.6
Total valid votes				

Newfoundland and Labrador provincial by-election, November 1, 2006: Signal Hill-Quidi Vidi Resignation of Jack Harris
Party	Candidate	Votes	%	±%
New Democratic	Lorraine Michael	1,68	55.2	+6.7
Progressive Conservative	Jerome Kennedy	1,595	44.8	-1.0
Total valid votes				
