= Newfoundland and Labrador New Democratic Party =

Provincial political party in Canada

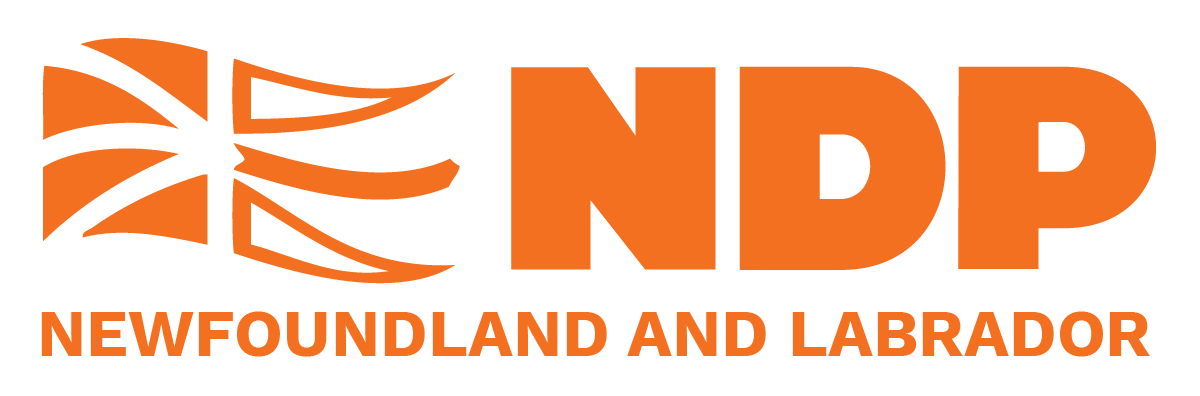
- Abbreviation: NL NDP
- Leader: Jim Dinn
- President: Laurabel Mba
- Founded: 1961
- Headquarters: St. John's, Newfoundland and Labrador
- Membership (2018): 2,600
- Ideology: Social democracy
- Political position: Centre-left
- National affiliation: New Democratic Party
- Colours: Orange, white, and blue
- House of Assembly: 2 / 40

Website
- nl.ndp.ca

The Newfoundland and Labrador New Democratic Party (NL NDP) is a social democratic political party in Newfoundland and Labrador, Canada. It is a provincial section of the federal New Democratic Party.

It was formed in 1961 as the successor to the Co-operative Commonwealth Federation (CCF) and the Newfoundland Democratic Party. The party first contested the 1962 provincial election. The party won its first seat in the House of Assembly in 1984 and has been represented in the legislature since 1990.

Lorraine Michael was elected leader of the NL NDP at the party's leadership election on May 28, 2006. She led the party during the 2007 and 2011 general elections, each time improving the party's share of vote from the previous election. In the 2011 election, a record five NDP MHAs were elected under her leadership. Michael was succeeded by former Fish, Food and Allied Workers Union president, Earle McCurdy on March 7, 2015. Following McCurdy's resignation in September 2017, Michael was named interim leader. In April 2018, MHA Gerry Rogers was elected leader. Rogers resigned the following year and economist Alison Coffin was acclaimed leader on March 5, 2019. In the 2021 provincial election, the party won two seats. In October 2021, MHA Jim Dinn was chosen as the party's interim leader following the resignation of Alison Coffin. He was later acclaimed as the permanent leader.

== History ==
=== Founding ===
The NL NDP is the successor party to the Co-operative Commonwealth Federation (CCF). The Newfoundland CCF was founded in 1955 when Sam Drover, a member of the Newfoundland House of Assembly for White Bay (Trinity North) left the provincial Liberal Party to sit as a member of the CCF. Drover became leader of the new provincial party, which fielded ten candidates, mostly in rural districts, in the 1956 provincial election. The CCF party failed to win any seats: Drover lost his own riding, winning 237 votes to the Liberal candidate's 1,437.

The CCF did not run candidates in the 1959 election; however, the party supported the Newfoundland Democratic Party. This party had been organised by the Newfoundland Federation of Labour with the support of the Canadian Labour Congress, to protest the Liberal government's decertification of the International Woodworkers of America in the course of a logging strike. The Newfoundland Democratic Party ran eighteen candidates, none of whom was elected. The party was led by Ed Finn, Jr. In 1961, the federal New Democratic Party was founded in with the merger of the federal CCF and the Canadian Labour Congress. The Newfoundland Democratic Party followed suit becoming the Newfoundland New Democratic Party with Finn leading the NL NDP into the 1962 provincial election and Calvin Normore doing so in 1966.

=== 1962–1984 ===
Since the 1962 general election, the party has run candidates in all of Newfoundland and Labrador's general elections. From 1962 to 1984, the party was led by seven different leaders and contested seven provincial elections. The party won an average of 3.3% of the vote in those elections and were unable to elect a candidate to the Newfoundland and Labrador House of Assembly.

=== Peter Fenwick years ===
Peter Fenwick succeeded Fonse Faour as party leader in 1981. In a 1984 by-election, Fenwick won the Labrador riding of Menihek becoming the first New Democrat to be elected in the province. In the 1985 general election the party won 14% of the popular vote, nearly quadrupling their share of the vote they received three years earlier. Even with their successful results Fenwick was the only NL NDP candidate elected. In 1986, Gene Long won the party's second seat in a by-election in the riding of St. John's East (since renamed Signal Hill-Quidi Vidi). Also that year Fenwick was arrested, along with union representatives, for participating in a strike by the Newfoundland Association of Public Employees (NAPE). Fenwick retired from politics in 1989 and did not run in that year's election. Cle Newhook replaced Fenwick as party leader and the NL NDP was once again left without representation after the 1989 election when both ridings they had held were won by Progressive Conservatives.

=== Jack Harris years ===
St. John's lawyer and former Member of Parliament Jack Harris won back the riding of St. John's East in a 1990 by-election after Progressive Conservative MHA Shannie Duff resigned to run for St. John's Mayor. Harris took nearly 50% of the vote in the by-election beating the Liberal candidate by 740 votes. In 1992, Harris succeed Newhook as party leader and led the party into the 1993 general election. For the first, and only, time in the party's history, they ran a full slate of candidates throughout the province. While they won almost 10,000 more votes than the previous election and increased their share of the popular vote from 3.4% to 7.4%, Harris remained the only New Democrat elected. The 1996 general election resulted in a landslide majority government for the Liberal Party, the New Democrats received only 4.45% of the vote and nominated candidates in only 20 of the provinces 48 ridings. Though the party suffered their worst electoral result in 14 years, Harris was easily re-elected in the new riding of Signal Hill-Quidi Vidi. He was re-elected to the Legislature in the 1999, and 2003 elections. Randy Collins was elected in Labrador West in 1999, and re-elected in 2003 before resigning in 2007. Harris resigned in 2006.

=== Lorraine Michael ===
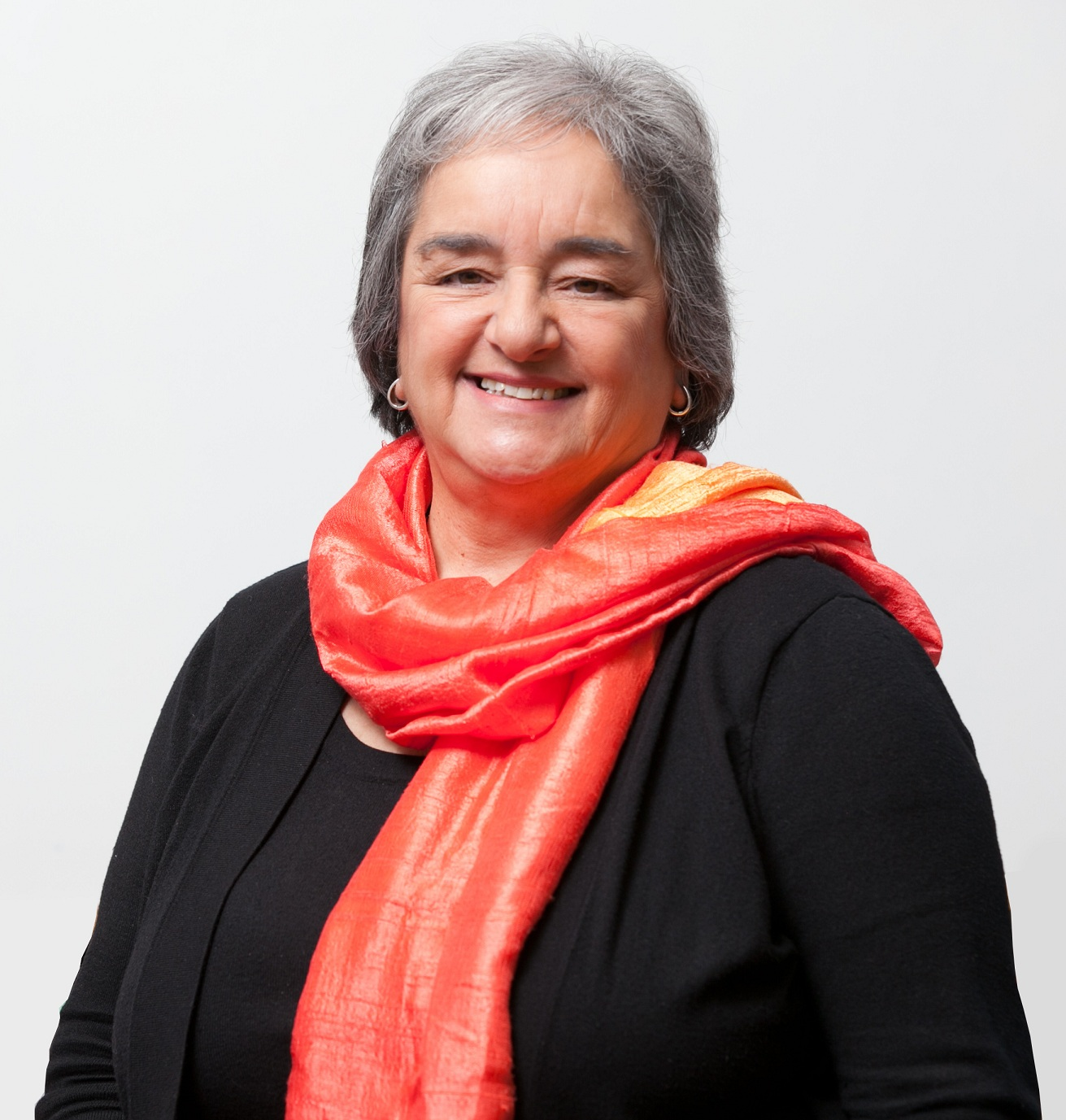
Lorraine Michael

Lorraine Michael won the leadership of the Newfoundland and Labrador NDP in 2006. After succeeding Harris as leader she was elected in his former district of Signal Hill-Quidi Vidi several months later. In the 2007 provincial election, Michael was the only New Democrat elected, though she increased her party's share of the popular vote.

Between 2007 and 2011, polling for the NL NDP remained below 10%p in public opinion polls behind the Liberal Party and governing Progressive Conservatives. However, after the federal NDP's success in the 2011 federal election, where they formed the official opposition, support for Michael's New Democrats saw a surge in support. In a Corporate Research Associates (CRA) poll conducted just weeks after the federal election in May 2011, the NL NDP support rose to 20%. For the first time in its history the party was statistically tied for second place with the Liberal Party, who were at 22%. The New Democrats' gains came at the expense of the governing Progressive Conservatives who fell to 57%. The NL NDP surpassed the Liberals in polling in September 2011, and won just under 25% of the popular vote, and five seats, in the October 11, 2011, general election. The Progressive Conservatives won their third straight majority government and while the New Democrats placed second in the popular vote, they finished third behind the Liberal Party in seats.

On October 21, 2013, it was revealed that Michael had received a letter from her caucus over the previous weekend calling for a leadership election to be held in 2014. The caucus felt that without renewal in the party they would have trouble attracting quality candidates and public support in the 2015 election. In an interview with the Canadian Broadcasting Corporation (CBC), Michael said she was shocked by the letter and felt betrayed by her caucus. Michael said she planned to sit down with her caucus before making a decision on what to do.

The letter led to a public fight within the NDP, particularly among the caucus. Both Gerry Rogers and George Murphy said they regretted sending the letter and supported Michael, while Dale Kirby and Chris Mitchelmore stood behind what they had written in the letter. Following the caucus meeting Michael agreed to having a vote on her leadership at the next annual general meeting of the party. Both Kirby and Mitchelmore later announced they were leaving the caucus to sit as Independent MHAs, and both men joined the Liberal Party in February 2014. The dispute over Michael's leadership also led to members of the provincial executive to resign. In May 2014, a party convention reaffirmed her leadership with the support of 75% of delegates. Michael announced on January 6, 2015 that she would step down as leader after the party performed poorly in four recent by-elections. While she was resigning as leader, Michael also stated that she planned to seek re-election as an MHA. Her term as leader ended when her successor was chosen in a leadership election held on March 7, 2015.

=== Earle McCurdy ===
Three candidates sought to succeed Michael as leader: former Fish, Food and Allied Workers Union leader Earle McCurdy, former Labrador City town councilor Mike Goosney and former NDP official Chris Bruce.

McCurdy won the election with 68% of the vote on March 7, 2015. He did not win his seat in the 2015 provincial election. Therefore, Michael subsequently served as NDP House Leader in the following parliamentary sessions.

On September 19, 2017, McCurdy announced his resignation as Leader, effective September 30, 2017. Following McCurdy's resignation, MHA and former leader Lorraine Michael was named interim leader.

=== Gerry Rogers ===
In April 2018, MHA Gerry Rogers was elected leader defeating economist Alison Coffin. Rogers was the first openly LGBTQ+ person to lead a political party in Newfoundland and Labrador. On February 12, 2019, Rogers announced she would be stepping down as leader and not seeking re-election in the upcoming 2019 election.

=== Alison Coffin ===
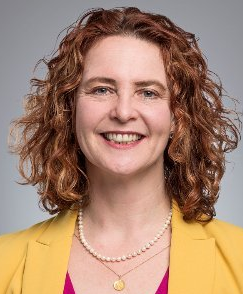
Alison Coffin

Memorial University economics professor and consultant Alison Coffin was acclaimed leader on March 5, 2019. Coffin led the party into the 2019 provincial election; despite only nominating 14 candidates (out of a possible 40) the party won three seats. Coffin won St. John’s East-Quidi Vidi holding it for the NDP, while the party led St. John’s Centre, and won an upset in Labrador West.

Coffin led the party into the 2021 provincial election. She was personally defeated in her district of St. John's East-Quidi Vidi; while the party held St. John's Centre and Labrador West. Coffin filed for a recount. On May 12, 2021, Supreme Court Justice Donald Burrage rejected Coffin's bid for a recount, arguing that there was not sufficient evidence.

On October 16, 2021, Coffin lost a leadership review by party members. She later chose to resign on October 19 and was replaced by MHA Jim Dinn as interim leader.

=== Jim Dinn ===
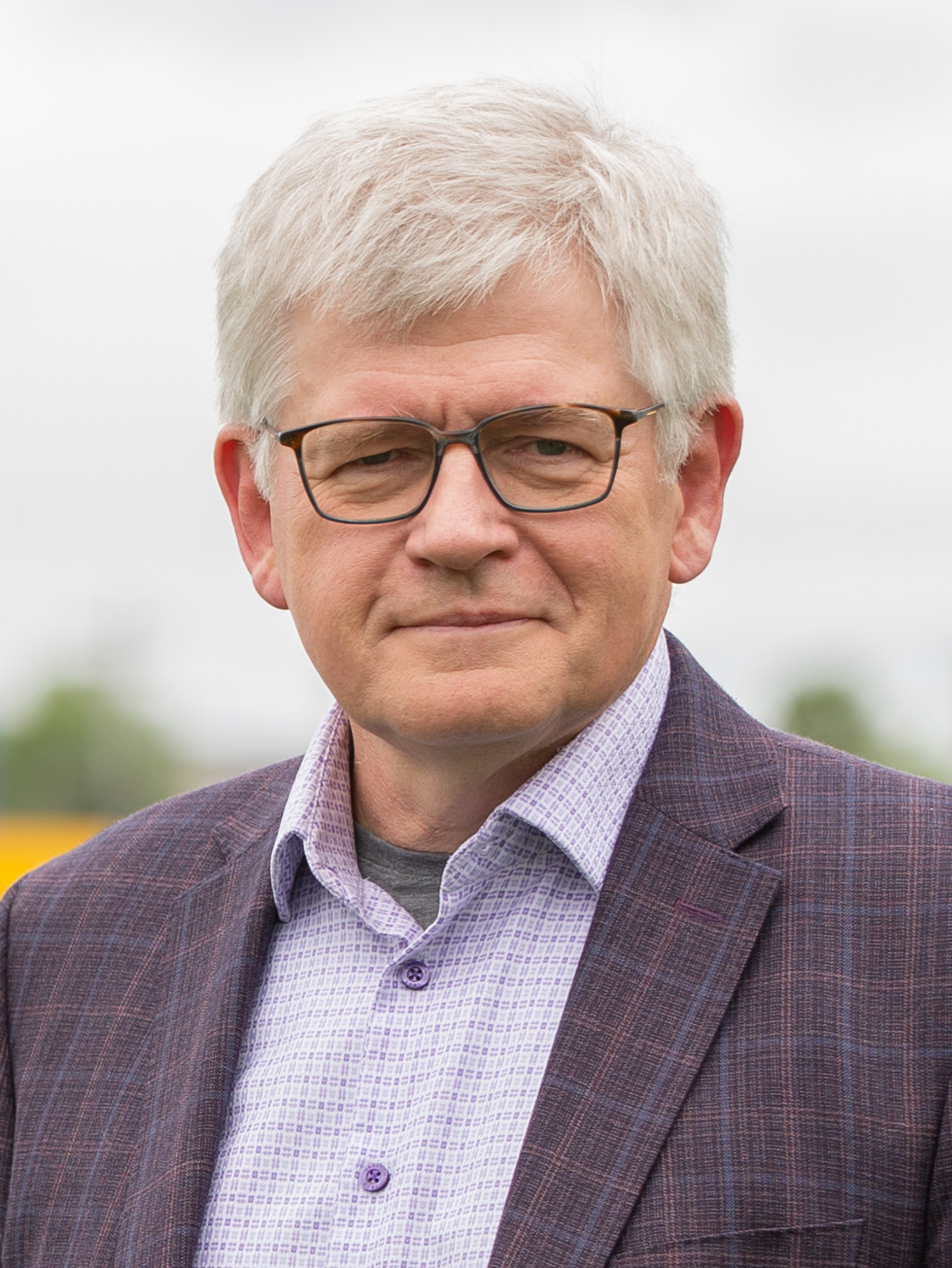
Jim Dinn

In October 2021, MHA Jim Dinn was chosen as the party's interim leader following the resignation of Alison Coffin. Prior to becoming a politician, Dinn had served as president of the Newfoundland and Labrador Teachers’ Association. On March 7, 2022, Torngat Mountains MHA Lela Evans joined the NDP caucus. On March 28, 2023, Dinn was acclaimed as permanent leader after the nomination deadline passed with no other candidates. On July 16, 2024, MHA Lela Evans rejoined the PC Party. On May 16, 2025, Jordan Brown, a member of the NDP caucus, announced that he would not seek re-election.

In the 2025 provincial election, the party lost Labrador West but regained St. John's East-Quidi Vidi, with Sheilagh O'Leary elected. On September 26, 2026, NL NDP delegates at their policy convention voted against a leadership convention with leader Jim Dinn receiving 89% support.

== Electoral performance ==
=== House of Assembly ===
| Election | Leader | Votes | % | Seats | +/− | Position | Status |
|---|---|---|---|---|---|---|---|
| 1956 (Note: As the Cooperative Commonwealth Federation) | Sam Drover | >1,964 | >1.7 | 0 / 36 | Steady | ▲3rd | No seats |
| 1959 (Note: As the Newfoundland Democratic party) | Ed Finn Jr. | 9,352 | 7.2 | 0 / 36 | Steady | 3rd | No seats |
| 1962 | Ed Finn Jr. | 7,479 | 3.6 | 0 / 42 | Steady | 3rd | No seats |
| 1966 | Calvin Normore | 2,725 | 1.8 | 0 / 42 | Steady | 3rd | No seats |
| 1971 | John Connors | 4,075 | 1.8 | 0 / 42 | Steady | ▼4th | No seats |
| 1972 | John Connors | 410 | 0.2 | 0 / 42 | Steady | ▲3rd | No seats |
| 1975 | Gerry Panting | 9,653 | 4.3 | 0 / 51 | Steady | ▼4th | No seats |
| 1979 | John Greene | 18,507 | 7.8 | 0 / 52 | Steady | ▲3rd | No seats |
| 1982 | Peter Fenwick | 9,371 | 3.7 | 0 / 52 | Steady | 3rd | No seats |
| 1985 | Peter Fenwick | 39,954 | 14.4 | 1 / 52 | ▲1 | ▲3rd | Third party |
| 1989 | Cle Newhook | 12,929 | 4.4 | 0 / 52 | ▼1 | 3rd | No seats |
| 1993 | Jack Harris | 22,399 | 7.4 | 1 / 52 | ▲1 | 3rd | Third party |
| 1996 | Jack Harris | 12,706 | 4.4 | 1 / 48 | Steady | 3rd | Third party |
| 1999 | Jack Harris | 21,962 | 8.2 | 2 / 48 | ▲1 | 3rd | Third party |
| 2003 | Jack Harris | 19,048 | 6.9 | 2 / 48 | Steady | 3rd | Third party |
| 2007 | Lorraine Michael | 19,028 | 8.5 | 1 / 48 | ▼1 | 3rd | Third party |
| 2011 | Lorraine Michael | 54,713 | 24.6 | 5 / 48 | ▲4 | 3rd | Third party |
| 2015 | Earle McCurdy | 24,130 | 12.1 | 2 / 40 | ▼3 | 3rd | Third party |
| 2019 | Alison Coffin | 13,434 | 6.3 | 3 / 40 | ▲1 | 3rd | Third party |
| 2021 | Alison Coffin | 14,323 | 8.0 | 2 / 40 | ▼1 | 3rd | Third party |
| 2025 | Jim Dinn | 16,579 | 8.3 | 2 / 40 | Steady | 3rd | Third party |

== Current Newfoundland and Labrador New Democrat MHAs ==
| Member | District | Elected | Notes |
|---|---|---|---|
| Jim Dinn | St. John's Centre | 2019 | Party Leader |
| Sheilagh O'Leary | St. John's East-Quidi Vidi | 2025 | |

=== Historical representation ===
The New Democratic Party won its first seat in the House of Assembly in 1984 when leader Peter Fenwick was elected in a by-election for the district of Labrador West. The party has been represented in the provincial legislature continually since 1990. Former leader Jack Harris was elected to represent the district of Signal Hill-Quidi Vidi in the 1990, 1993, 1996, 1999 and 2003 provincial elections. Signal Hill-Quidi Vidi (now St. John's East-Quidi Vidi) had been represented by the NDP since 1990, including leaders Harris, Michael, and Coffin, until Coffin's defeat in 2021.

- Sam Drover, MHA for White Bay, 1955–1956 CCF (Drover crossed the floor from the Liberals),
- Peter Fenwick, MHA for Menihek (Labrador West), 1984–1985, 1985–1989
- Gene Long, MHA for St. John's East, 1986–1989
- Jack Harris, MHA for St. John's East, 1990 (by-election)-1995, Signal Hill-Quidi Vidi 1995–2006
- Randy Collins, MHA for Labrador West, 1999–2007
- Lorraine Michael, MHA for Signal Hill-Quidi Vidi, 2006–2015; St. John's East-Quidi Vidi, 2015–2019
- Dale Kirby, MHA for St. John's North, 2011–2013
- Christopher Mitchelmore, MHA for The Straits-White Bay North, 2011–2013
- George Murphy, MHA for St. John's East, 2011–2015
- Gerry Rogers, MHA for St. John's Centre, 2011–2019
- Alison Coffin, MHA for St. John's East-Quidi Vidi, 2019–2021
- Lela Evans, MHA for Torngat Mountains, 2022–2024
- Jordan Brown, MHA for Labrador West, 2019–2025

== Relationship with the federal party ==
The NL NDP is affiliated with the federal New Democratic Party. Two of the three New Democratic Party Members of Parliament ever elected to the House of Commons of Canada from Newfoundland and Labrador went on to lead the provincial party:

- Fonse Faour, who won a by-election in 1978 in the federal riding of Humber—St. George's—St. Barbe, and was re-elected the following year in the 1979 federal election in the renamed riding of Humber—Port au Port—St. Barbe. Faour was defeated in the subsequent 1980 federal election. He then went on to serve as leader of the provincial party.
- Jack Harris won a 1987 by-election in the riding of St. John's East. However, he was defeated the following year in the 1988 federal election. Harris served as leader of the provincial party before being re-elected to represent St. John's East in the 2008 federal election. Harris retired in 2021.

== Leaders ==
- Sam Drover, 1955–1956. Although not elected as leader of the party, Samuel Drover effectively led the NL NDP's predecessor party, the CCF, in the 1956 provincial election. In 1955, Drover had crossed the floor from the Liberal Party to sit in the opposition as a CCF MHA.
- Ed Finn, Jr., 1959–1963. Ed Finn became co-leader of the Newfoundland Democratic Party upon its inception in 1959, and assumed the leadership of the CCF and the New Democratic Party. Finn narrowly lost his bid for a seat in the House of Assembly in the 1962 provincial election when he ran for the NL NDP in Humber West. He left Newfoundland and Labrador in 1963 to pursue a career as a labour researcher, writer, and journalist.
- Calvin Normore, 1963—1966, led the party during the 1966 provincial election. Head of the Corner Brook Labor Council and vice-president of the Newfoundland Federation of Labour, he had been co-leader of the Newfoundland Democratic Party in 1959.
- Esau Thoms, 1966–1970. A founding member of the Newfoundland Democratic Party in the late 1950s and one of the province's foremost labour organizers, who served as president of the Newfoundland Federation of Labour from 1960 to 1968, Esau Thoms had contested two federal elections for the CCF. From 1966 to 1970, the Newfoundland and Labrador New Democratic Party was without a formal leader, relying instead upon local committees throughout the province, but Thoms was essentially de facto leader. He was a consistently outspoken voice for social democracy and social justice until his death in 1979.
- John Connors, 1970–1974. John Connors took the reins of the party in 1970 at a difficult time, as the electorate became sharply divided over whether to continue supporting the Liberal Party. Connors was a candidate for the NL NDP in the 1968 federal election, and was one of only three NL NDP candidates in the 1972 provincial campaign. He later pursued a career at the Marine Institute.
- Gerry Panting, 1974–1977. Gerald Panting led the party from 1974 to 1977. Panting was a distinguished historian and founder of the Maritime History Group at Memorial University of Newfoundland. He ran for the NL NDP provincially five times, coming in a strong second in the 1975 general election. A dedicated party builder, Panting remained active within the NL NDP until his death in 1998.
- John Greene, 1977–1980. A schoolteacher from Fogo Island, Greene led the NL NDP from 1977 to 1980 and played a significant role in building the party. He came close to winning a seat in the House of Assembly, giving a strong showing in the televised leaders debate. Due to his leadership the NL NDP became a recognized provincial party. This helped set the stage for the party's later electoral success. Greene later became an author and remained active in various human rights organizations.
- Fonse Faour, 1980–1981. Fonse Faour served a one-year term a leader from 1980 to 1981 after serving as the party's first Member of Parliament from Newfoundland and Labrador in the House of Commons. He was elected as an MP in 1978 and 1979, and was defeated in the 1980 federal election. He then became provincial party leader but resigned after a year due to the difficulties in maintaining his law practice while being party leader. Faour later worked in senior positions with the provincial public service and served as Chairperson and Chief Executive Officer of the Public Service Commission. In 2003, Faour was appointed to the trial division of the Newfoundland and Labrador Supreme Court.
- Peter Fenwick, 1981–1989. Leader from 1981 to 1989, in 1984 Fenwick set a landmark in provincial history by becoming the first New Democrat to be elected to the House of Assembly, sitting as the member for the former Labrador district of Menihek. He was re-elected in 1985. An outspoken leader, he was jailed in 1986 along with union representatives who participated in a strike by the Newfoundland Association of Public Employees.
- Cle Newhook 1989–1992. Cle Newhook served as party leader from 1989 to 1992 after working full-time as the party's provincial secretary from 1986 to 1988. As a candidate in several elections, and through work as leader and provincial secretary, he played a major role in the party's development throughout the 1980s and early 1990s. Newhook now works as a consultant in St. John's.
- Jack Harris, 1992–2006. First elected as Member of Parliament for St. John's East in 1987, he was elected to the Newfoundland and Labrador House of Assembly in the 1990 provincial election and was acclaimed leader of the NL NDP in 1992. He was re-elected to the Legislature in the 1993, 1996, 1999 and 2003 elections. In October 2008, Harris was a second time elected Member of Parliament for the riding of St. John's East receiving 74.1% of the vote—the fifth-highest winning percentage in Canada.
- Lorraine Michael, 2006–2015, 2017-2018 (interim). Upon winning the NL NDP leadership election in May 2006, Michael later won the by-election for Signal Hill-Quidi Vidi in November of that year. She was re-elected in her riding in the 2007 general election, and in the 2011 election a record five NDP MHAs were elected by the voters. She resigned as leader in 2015 but was re-elected as MHA. Following McCurdy's resignation in September 2017, Michael was named interim leader.
- Earle McCurdy, 2015—2017. McCurdy won the leadership in 2015. He had been president of the Fish, Food and Allied Workers Union from 1993 to 2014.
- Gerry Rogers, 2018—2019. MHA for St. John's Centre. Rogers was the first openly LGBT person to lead a political party in Newfoundland and Labrador.
- Alison Coffin, 2019—2021. Economist and runner-up in the 2018 leadership election. Was acclaimed leader following Rogers's resignation in 2019. MHA for St. John's East-Quidi Vidi. Lost her seat in the 2021 provincial election.
- Jim Dinn, 2021–2023 (interim), 2023–present (permanent). Interim leader following Coffin's resignation. Acclaimed as permanent leader in 2023.

== See also ==
- 1989 New Democratic Party of Newfoundland and Labrador leadership election
- 2006 New Democratic Party of Newfoundland and Labrador leadership election
- 2015 New Democratic Party of Newfoundland and Labrador leadership election
- 2018 New Democratic Party of Newfoundland and Labrador leadership election
- 2019 New Democratic Party of Newfoundland and Labrador leadership election
- 2023 New Democratic Party of Newfoundland and Labrador leadership election
- List of political parties in Newfoundland and Labrador
- William Coaker
