= Tom Osborne (Canadian politician) =

Canadian politician (born 1964)

The Honourable Tom Osborne ECNL MP
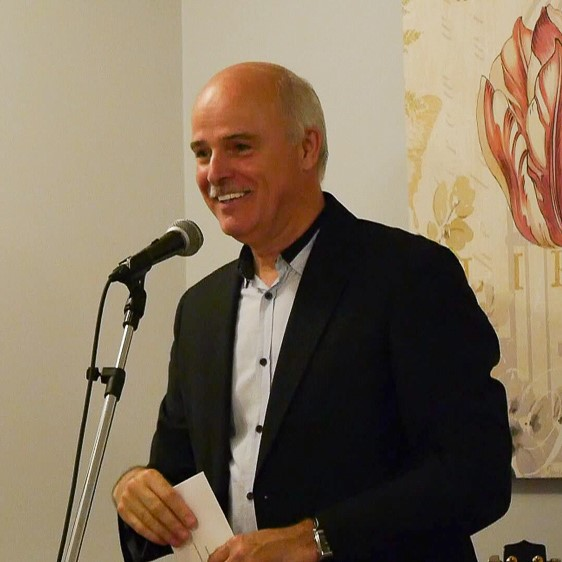
- Osborne in 2017

Member of Parliament for Cape Spear—Mount Pearl—Paradise (Cape Spear; 2025–2026)
- Incumbent
- Assumed office April 28, 2025
- Preceded by: Seamus O'Regan

Parliamentary Secretary to the President of the Treasury Board
- Incumbent
- Assumed office June 5, 2025
- President: Shafqat Ali

Member of the Newfoundland and Labrador House of Assembly for Waterford Valley St. John's South (1996-2015)
- In office February 22, 1996 – July 5, 2024
- Preceded by: Tom Murphy
- Succeeded by: Jamie Korab
Provincial ministerial offices
Newfoundland and Labrador Minister of Health and Community Services
In office July 6, 2022 – July 5, 2024
Premier	Andrew Furey
Preceded by	John Haggie
Succeeded by	John Hogan
In office March 14, 2006 – January 19, 2007
Premier	Danny Williams
Preceded by	John Ottenheimer
Succeeded by	Ross Wiseman
Newfoundland and Labrador Minister of Education
In office August 19, 2020 – July 6, 2022
Premier	Andrew Furey
Preceded by	Brian Warr
Succeeded by	John Haggie
Newfoundland and Labrador Minister of Finance and President of Treasury
In office July 31, 2017 – August 19, 2020
Premier	Dwight Ball
Preceded by	Cathy Bennett
Succeeded by	Siobhán Coady
Speaker of the Newfoundland and Labrador House of Assembly
In office December 14, 2015 – July 31, 2017
Preceded by	Wade Verge
Succeeded by	Perry Trimper
Newfoundland and Labrador Minister of Justice
In office January 19, 2007 – October 30, 2007
Premier	Danny Williams
Preceded by	Paul Shelley
Succeeded by	Jerome Kennedy
Newfoundland and Labrador Minister of Environment and Conservation, Minister of Labour, And Minister Responsible for the strategic social plan (Note: Stylized as Minister of Environment and Labour until February 20, 2004)
In office November 6, 2003 – March 14, 2006
Premier	Danny Williams
Preceded by	Bob Mercer (Environment); Percy Barrett (Labour)
Succeeded by	Clyde Jackman

Personal details
- Born: September 20, 1964 (age 62) St. John's, Newfoundland and Labrador, Canada
- Party: Liberal (federal); Liberal (provincial, since 2013)
- Other political affiliations: Progressive Conservative (until 2012); Independent (2012–2013)
- Parent: Sheila Osborne (mother)

Thomas Osborne Jr. ECNL MP (born September 20, 1964) is a politician in Newfoundland and Labrador, Canada. He represented the district of Waterford Valley in the Newfoundland and Labrador House of Assembly from 1996 to 2024. He was a member of the Liberal Party, a former member of the Progressive Conservative Party, and a former Minister in Danny Williams' first cabinet. He served as Minister of Health and Community Services, and Minister of Education in the Furey government. He was Speaker of the House of Assembly from 2015 to 2017. In 2025 he won the federal seat of Cape Spear and became an MP.

At the time of his retirement from provincial politics, Osborne was the province's longest consecutively-serving MHA having been in the House of Assembly from 1996 to 2024.

== Politics ==
Prior to entering politics Osborne worked for Statistics Canada, Small Business Enterprise, and with the Penney Group of Companies. Born in St. John's on September 20, 1964, he is the son Tom and former Newfoundland MHA Sheila Osborne.

=== Opposition ===
Osborne was first elected to the Newfoundland and Labrador House of Assembly in the 1996 provincial election in the district of St. John's South. The election resulted in a landslide victory for Brian Tobin's Liberals and Osborne was one of only nine Progressive Conservatives elected. Osborne was re-elected in the 1999 election and though the PC's had gained 5 seats the Liberals still won a large majority government.

=== In government ===
With the victory of the Progressive Conservatives in the 2003 election Premier Danny Williams appointed Osborne to Cabinet as the Minister responsible for Environment and Labour. On February 20, 2004 Government announced a restructuring of departments, which saw the creation of the new Department of Environment and Conservation, which Osborne remained minister of.

On March 14, 2006, Osborne became Minister of Health and Community Services succeeding John Ottenheimer. During his time as Minister of Health more information on errors in hormone receptor breast cancer testing were coming to light. The errors eventually led to the Commission of Inquiry on Hormone Receptor Testing.

In January 2007, with the announcement that several cabinet Ministers would not be seeking re-election in that October's general election Williams shuffled his Cabinet. Osborne was assigned the Justice portfolio taking over for Paul Shelley who was retiring from politics in October.

With the re-election of the Progressive Conservatives in 2007, Osborne was replaced as Justice Minister by Jerome Kennedy. Williams announced he would be nominating Osborne to serve as Deputy Chair of Committees in the House of Assembly and on November 1, 2007, he was confirmed to serve as Deputy Chair of Committees in the House of Assembly.

In 2008, Osborne testified at the Commission of Inquiry on Hormone Receptor Testing and was asked about his time as Minister of Health.

He was re-elected in the 2011 general election.

=== Opposition ===
In September 2012, Osborne resigned from the Progressive Conservative party citing the leadership of Premier Kathy Dunderdale and began sitting as an independent. On August 29, 2013, Osborne joined the Liberal Party of Newfoundland and Labrador.

=== Ball and Furey governments (2015-2024) ===
In the 2015 election the Liberal Party won control of the House of Assembly and Osborne was chosen as Speaker. Following the resignation of Cathy Bennett, Osborne was appointed Minister of Finance in the Ball government on July 31, 2017. He was re-elected in the 2019 provincial election. On August 19, 2020, he was appointed Minister of Education in the Furey government.

He was re-elected in the 2021 provincial election. On July 6, 2022, he was appointed Minister of Health and Community Services. On May 24, 2024, Osborne announced his retirement effective in July 2024. On July 5, 2024, Osborne resigned. The Waterford Valley provincial by-election was scheduled for August 22, 2024. On August 22, 2024, Liberal Jamie Korab won the provincial by-election.

=== Federal politics ===
In March 2025, Osborne announced that he is seeking the federal Liberal nomination in Cape Spear. He won the nomination on March 21, defeating two other candidates. He was elected by a wide margin. On June 5, 2025, Osborne was appointed Parliamentary Secretary to the President of the Treasury Board.

== Electoral record ==
2025 Canadian federal election: Cape Spear
Party	Candidate	Votes	%	±%	Expenditures
Liberal	Tom Osborne	31,388	68.25	+13.53	$87,754.29
Conservative	Corey Curtis	11,844	25.75	+5.37	none listed
New Democratic	Brenda Walsh	2,446	5.32	−17.81	$0.00
Animal Protection	Mike Peach	170	0.37	N/A	$4,451.67
Green	Kaelem Tingate	140	0.30	N/A	$0.00
Total valid votes/expense limit		45,988	99.03	+0.10	$126,725.23
Total rejected ballots		451	0.97	-0.10	
Turnout		46,439	66.50		
Eligible voters		69,828			
Liberal notional hold		Swing		+4.08	
Source: Elections Canada

2021 Newfoundland and Labrador general election: Waterford Valley
Party	Candidate	Votes	%	±%
Liberal	Tom Osborne	3,592	66.79	-1.77
Progressive Conservative	Michael Holden	1,348	25.07	
New Democratic	Peter Young	438	8.14	-23.29
Total valid votes		5,378	99.13	
Total rejected ballots		47	0.87	-1.42
Turnout		5,425	52.80	+0.26
Eligible voters		10,274		
Liberal hold		Swing		-13.42
Source(s) "Officially Nominated Candidates General Election 2021" (PDF). Elections Newfoundland and Labrador. "2021 Provincial General Election Report" (PDF).

Waterford Valley - 2019 Newfoundland and Labrador general election
Party	Candidate	Votes	%	±%
Liberal	Tom Osborne	3,487	68.6%	–
NDP	Matthew Cooper	1,599	31.4%	

Waterford Valley - 2015 Newfoundland and Labrador general election
Party	Candidate	Votes	%	±%
Liberal	Tom Osborne	3,588	65.9%	–
NDP	Alison Coffin	1,062	19.5%	
Progressive Conservative	Alison Stoodley	792	14.6%	

St. John's South - 2011 Newfoundland and Labrador general election
Party	Candidate	Votes	%	±%
Progressive Conservative	Tom Osborne	2,966	57.90%	–
NDP	Keith Dunne	1,994	38.92%	
Liberal	Trevor Hickey	163	3.18%	

St. John's South - 2007 Newfoundland and Labrador general election
Party	Candidate	Votes	%	±%
Progressive Conservative	Tom Osborne	3887	79.6%	–
NDP	Clyde Bridger	571	11.69%	
Liberal	Rex Gibbons	425	8.7%	

St. John's South - 2003 Newfoundland and Labrador general election
Party	Candidate	Votes	%	±%
Progressive Conservative	Tom Osborne	4,532	76.0%	–
Liberal	Dennis O'Keefe*	756	12.7%	
NDP	Tom McGinnis	676	11.3%	

- Dennis O'Keefe who ran as the Liberal candidate is not the same Dennis O'Keefe that was Mayor of St. John's; or the same Dennis O'Keeffe who was a professor of social science.

St. John's South - 1999 Newfoundland general election
Party	Candidate	Votes	%	±%
Progressive Conservative	Tom Osborne	4,041	66.32%	–
Liberal	Patrick Kennedy	1563	25.65%	
NDP	Judy Vanata	374	6.14%	
Independent	Jason Crummey	101	1.66%	

St. John's South - 1996 Newfoundland general election
Party	Candidate	Votes	%	±%
Progressive Conservative	Tom Osborne	2,521	42.17%	–
Liberal	Tom Murphy	2,417	40.43%	
NDP	Sue Skipton	858	14.35%	
Independent	Bill Maddigan	155	2.59%	
