= 2013 Canadian Junior Curling Championships =

2013 M&M Meat Shops Canadian Junior Curling Championships
- Host city: Fort McMurray, Alberta
- Arena: Suncor Community Leisure Centre; Oilsands Curling Club
- Dates: January 31 – February 10
- Men's winner: Manitoba
- Curling club: West Kildonan CC, Winnipeg
- Skip: Matt Dunstone
- Third: Colton Lott
- Second: Daniel Grant
- Lead: Brendan MacCuish
- Coach: Scott Grant
- Finalist: Alberta (Thomas Scoffin)
- Women's winner: British Columbia
- Curling club: Kamloops Curling Club, Kamloops
- Skip: Corryn Brown
- Third: Erin Pincott
- Second: Samantha Fisher
- Lead: Sydney Fraser
- Finalist: Manitoba (Shannon Birchard)

The 2013 M&M Meat Shops Canadian Junior Curling Championships were held from January 31 to February 10 at the Suncor Community Leisure Centre at MacDonald Island Park and at the Oilsands Curling Club in Fort McMurray, Alberta. Alberta last hosted the junior championships in Calgary in 2011. The winners will represent Canada at the 2013 World Junior Curling Championships in Sochi, Russia.

== Men ==
=== Round-robin standings ===
Final round-robin standings

Key
Teams to Championship Pool

Pool A	Skip	W	L
Alberta	Thomas Scoffin	5	1
Ontario	Aaron Squires	5	1
Saskatchewan	Brady Scharback	4	2
British Columbia	Tyler Klymchuk	3	3
Prince Edward Island	Tyler Smith	2	4
Yukon	Will Mahoney	2	4
Nunavut	David Kakuktinniq	0	6

Pool B	Skip	W	L
New Brunswick	Josh Barry	5	1
Nova Scotia	Stuart Thompson	5	1
Manitoba	Matt Dunstone	4	2
Quebec	Félix Asselin	3	3
Newfoundland and Labrador	Adam Boland	2	4
Northern Ontario	Matt Roberts	2	4
Northwest Territories	Daniel Murray	0	6

=== Championship Pool Standings ===
Final Standings

Key
Teams to Playoffs
Teams to Tiebreaker

Province	Skip	W	L
Alberta	Thomas Scoffin	9	1
Nova Scotia	Stuart Thompson	8	2
Manitoba	Matt Dunstone	7	3
Ontario	Aaron Squires	7	3
New Brunswick	Josh Barry	6	4
Saskatchewan	Brady Scharback	6	4
British Columbia	Tyler Klymchuk	4	6
Quebec	Félix Asselin	3	7

=== Playoffs ===
Semifinal			Final
			1	Alberta	3
2	Nova Scotia	4	3	Manitoba	4
3	Manitoba	9

==== Semifinal ====
Saturday, February 9, 10:30 am

Sheet B	1	2	3	4	5	6	7	8	9	10	Final
Nova Scotia (Thompson)	0	1	0	0	2	0	1	0	0	X	4
Manitoba (Dunstone)	0	0	0	3	0	1	0	3	2	X	9

Player percentages
Nova Scotia		Manitoba	
Alex MacNeil	97%	Brendan MacCuish	93%
Luke Saunders	81%	Daniel Grant	94%
Scott Babin	76%	Colton Lott	93%
Stuart Thompson	72%	Matt Dunstone	88%
Total	82%	Total	92%

==== Final ====
Saturday, February 9, 5:00 pm

Sheet B	1	2	3	4	5	6	7	8	9	10	Final
Alberta (Scoffin)	0	1	0	0	0	0	0	1	1	0	3
Manitoba (Dunstone)	0	0	0	0	2	1	0	0	0	1	4

Player percentages
Alberta		Manitoba	
Bryce Bucholz	91%	Brendan MacCuish	86%
Landon Bucholz	88%	Daniel Grant	98%
Dylan Gosseau	80%	Colton Lott	96%
Thomas Scoffin	88%	Matt Dunstone	84%
Total	87%	Total	91%

== Women ==
=== Round-robin standings ===
Final round-robin standings

Key
Teams to Championship Pool
Teams to Tiebreakers

Pool A	Skip	W	L
British Columbia	Corryn Brown	5	1
Yukon	Sarah Koltun	4	2
Alberta	Karynn Flory	3	3
New Brunswick	Jessica Daigle	3	3
Newfoundland and Labrador	Carolyn Suley	3	3
Saskatchewan	Jessica Hanson	3	3
Nunavut	Sadie Pinksen	0	6

Pool B	Skip	W	L
Manitoba	Shannon Birchard	6	0
Ontario	Jamie Sinclair	5	1
Nova Scotia	Mary Myketyn-Driscoll	3	3
Quebec	Sarah Dumais	2	4
Northwest Territories	Carina McKay-Saturnino	2	4
Northern Ontario	Tirzah Keffer	2	4
Prince Edward Island	Veronica Smith	1	5

=== Championship Pool Standings ===
Final Standings

Key
Teams to Playoffs
Teams to Tiebreaker

Province	Skip	W	L
British Columbia	Corryn Brown	9	1
Manitoba	Shannon Birchard	9	1
Ontario	Jamie Sinclair	7	3
Yukon	Sarah Koltun	7	3
Saskatchewan	Jessica Hanson	5	5
New Brunswick	Jessica Daigle	4	6
Nova Scotia	Mary Myketyn-Driscoll	3	7
Quebec	Sarah Dumais	3	7

=== Playoffs ===
Semifinal			Final
			1	British Columbia	6
2	Manitoba	10	2	Manitoba	3
3	Ontario	6

==== Semifinal ====
Sunday, February 10, 10:30 am

Sheet B	1	2	3	4	5	6	7	8	9	10	11	Final
Manitoba (Birchard)	0	0	1	0	4	0	0	1	0	0	4	10
Ontario (Sinclair)	1	0	0	1	0	1	1	0	1	1	0	6

Player percentages
Manitoba		Ontario	
Mariah Mondor	86%	Erin Jenkins	91%
Shenya Andreis	86%	Katelyn Wasyikiw	81%
Nicole Sigvaldason	81%	Holly Donaldson	82%
Shannon Birchard	73%	Jamie Sinclair	69%
Total	82%	Total	81%

==== Final ====
Sunday, February 10, 5:00 pm

Sheet B	1	2	3	4	5	6	7	8	9	10	Final
British Columbia (Brown)	0	0	0	1	0	0	3	0	1	1	6
Manitoba (Birchard)	0	0	0	0	0	2	0	1	0	0	3

Player percentages
British Columbia		Manitoba	
Sydney Fraser	81%	Mariah Mondor	71%
Samantha Fisher	76%	Shenya Andreis	78%
Erin Pincott	71%	Nicole Sigvaldason	71%
Corryn Brown	79%	Shannon Birchard	78%
Total	77%	Total	72%

== Qualification ==
=== Newfoundland and Labrador ===
- The Junior Provincials are being held January 2–7 at the Gander Curling Club in Gander

Results:

Men's	W	L
Stephen Trickett (ReMax)	6	0
Adam Boland (Gander)	4	2
John Sheppard (ReMax)	4	2
Greg Blyde (ReMax)	3	3
Evan Kearley (Bally Haly)	3	3
Andrew Taylor (ReMax)	1	5
Kyle Barron (Caribou)	0	6

Women's	W	L
Sarah Hill (ReMax)	5	1
Carolyn Suley (ReMax)	5	1
Lauren Newell (Caribou)	2	4
Megan Kearley (ReMax)	0	6

- Men's semi-final: Boland 8, Sheppard 4
- Men's final: Boland 7, Trickett 3
- Women's final: Suley 5, Hill 3

=== Nova Scotia ===
The 2013 AMJ Campbell NS Junior Provincials were held December 27–31, 2012 at the Chester Curling Club in Chester, Nova Scotia. The event was a triple knock-out.

Results:

Men's	W	L
Stuart Thompson (Mayflower)	6	0
Colten Steele (Dartmouth)	4	3
Jonathan Crouse (Truro)	3	3
Nick Schroeder (Halifax)	3	3
Matthew Manuel (Mayflower)	2	3
Robert Mayhew (Wolfville)	2	3
Cooper Kelly (Truro)	0	3
Trevor Crouse (Bridgewater)	0	3

Women's	W	L
Mary Myketyn-Driscoll (Truro)	6	2
Emily Dwyer (Mayflower)	5	3
Mary Fay (Chester)	5	3
Raquel Bachman (Bridgewater)	3	3
Teagan Lombardo (Highlander)	2	3
Alicia Brine (Mayflower)	1	3
Micayla Dorey (Wolfville)	1	3
Hayley McCabe (Lakeshore)	0	3

=== Prince Edward Island ===
- The Pepsi Provincial Junior Curling Championships are being held January 2–6 at the Cornwall Curling Club in Cornwall.

Results:

Men's	W	L
Christopher Gallant (Charlottetown)	6	0
Cody Dixon (Montague)	3	3
Matthew MacLean (Maple Leaf)	3	3
Tyler Smith (Cornwall)	3	3
Shawn Pitre (Charlottetown)	3	3
Alex MacFadyen (Silver Fox)	3	3
Justin Campbell (Silver Fox)	0	6

Women's	W	L
Amanda MacLean (Cornwall)	4	0
Veronica Smith (Cornwall)	3	1
Kaleigh MacKay (Crapaud/Silver Fox)	2	2
Emily Keen (Charlottetown/Cornwall)	1	3
Rachel O'Connor (Cornwall)	0	4

- Men's tie breaker: Pitre 7, MacFadyen 5
- Men's quarter finals: Smith 9, MacLean 8; Dixon 7, Pitre 6
- Men's semi final: Smith 8, Dixon 4
- Men's final: Smith 6, Gallant 2
- Women's semi final: Smith 4, MacKay 3
- Women's final: Smith 9, MacLean 5

=== New Brunswick ===
- The O'Leary Junior Provincial Championships are being held January 3–6 at the Bathurst Curling Club in Bathurst.

The event is a triple knock out.

Results:

Men's	W	L
Josh Barry (Capital)	7	0
Kyle Hughes (Riverside)	4	3
Jordon Craft (Thistle St. Andrews)	3	3
Dmitri Makrides (Capital)	2	3
Matt Nason (Thistle St. Andrews)	2	3
Evan MacKnight (Gage)	1	3
Matt Stanley (Moncton)	1	3
Chris Wagner (Capital)	1	3

Women's	W	L
Jessica Daigle (Capital)	7	2
Jennifer Armstrong (Fredericton)	6	3
Justine Comeau (Capital)	3	3
Danielle Hubbard (Miramichi)	3	3
Jamie Ward (Capital)	2	3
Samantha Crook (Gage)	1	3
Maura Boyle (Riverside)	1	3
Amber Hicks (Sackville)	0	3

=== Quebec ===
- The Quebec Provincial Junior Championships are being held Jan 3–8 at the Club de curling Etchemin in Saint-Romuald.

The event is a triple knock-out with a page playoff.

Results:

Men's	W	L
Félix Asselin (Glenmore)	3	0
Jeff Stewart (Valleyfield)	4	1
Alex Hall (Montréal Ouest)	4	2
Grégory Bornais (Laviolette)	4	2
Alex Robichaud (Rosemère/Glenmore)	3	3
Mark Fajertag (Victoria)	2	3
Alek Bédard (Lacolle)	2	3
Scott MacDonald-Ducharme (Belvédère)	1	3
Alexandre Bergeron-Gallant (Victoria)	0	3
Vincent Fortin (Belvédère)	0	3

Women's	W	L
Sarah Dumais (Etchemin)	4	0
Lisa Davies (Glenmore/Montréal Ouest)	4	1
Laura Guénard (Dolbeau/Chicoutimi)	3	2
Marianne Girard (Victoria/Jacques-Cartier)	3	2
Gabrielle Ménard-Godin (Lacolle)	4	3
Geneviève Laurier (Trois-Rivières)	3	3
Sarah-Jane Sass (Valleyfield)	2	3
Marie-Pier Dicaire (Belvédère)	2	3
Camille Boisvert (St-Lambert)	1	3
Émilia Gagné (Riverbend)	0	3
Gabrielle Lavoie (Victoria)	0	3

- Men's Q1 vs. Q2: Asselin 8, Stewart 7
- Men's Q3 vs. Q4: Bornais 11, Hall 3
- Men's semi final: Bornais 8, Stewart 7
- Men's final: Asselin 7, Bornais 4
- Women's Q1 vs. Q2: Davies 7, Dumais 5
- Women's Q3 vs. Q4: Guénard 10, Girard 7
- Women's semi final: Dumais 8, Guénard 7
- Women's final: Dumais 8, Davis 5

=== Ontario ===
The Pepsi Ontario Junior Curling Championships were held January 2–6 at the Highland Country Club in London.

Results:

Men's	W	L
Aaron Squires (St. Thomas)	6	1
Chris Lewis (Huntley)	5	2
Richard Krell (Highland)	5	2
Conor Joudrey (Dixie)	4	3
Michael McGaugh (Chinguacousy)	4	3
Ben Bevan (Annandale)	3	4
Ben Miskew (Rideau)	1	6
Jeff Brown (Shelburne)	0	7

Women's	W	L
Jamie Sinclair (Manotick)	6	1
Caitlin Romain (Kitchener-Waterloo Granite)	6	1
Chelsea Brandwood (Grimsby)	5	2
Jestyn Murphy (Mississaugua)	5	2
Kristina Adams (Peterborough)	2	5
Chantal Allan (Highland)	2	5
Kendall Haymes (Westmount)	2	5
Casandra Raganold (Winchester)	0	7

- Men's semi final: Lewis 9, Krell 4
- Men's final: Squires 9, Lewis 5
- Women's tie breaker: Brandwood 7, Murphy 4
- Women's semi final: Romain 5, Brandwood 4
- Women's final: Sinclair 6, Romain 3

=== Northern Ontario ===
- The Junior Provincials are being held January 3–6 at the Kapuskasing Curling Club in Kapuskasing (men's) and at the Soo Curlers Association in Sault Ste. Marie (women's).

Results:

Men's	W	L
Kurtis Byrd (Port Arthur)	5	2
Nick Dawson (Soo)	5	2
Zach Warkentin (Port Arthur)	5	2
Jay Turner (Atikokan)	4	3
Tanner Horgan (Idylwylde)	3	4
Connor Lawes (North Bay Granite)	2	5
Cody Tetreault (Thessalon)	2	5
Brennan Wark (Port Arthur)	2	5

Women's	W	L
Tirzah Keffer (Port Arthur)	7	0
Krysta Burns (Idylwylde)	5	2
Brianne Manson (Idylwylde)	4	3
Megan St. Amand (Port Arthur)	4	3
Sarah-Anne Guay (Kapuskasing)	3	4
Jessica Haw (Stratton)	3	4
Robin Beaudry (Idylwylde)	2	5
Jenny Keetch (Port Arthur)	0	7

- Men's tie breaker: Warkentin 8, Dawson 7
- Men's final: Warkentin 7, Byrd 6
- Women's final: Keffer 7, Burns 4

=== Manitoba ===
The Canola Junior Provincial Championships are being held January 3–7 at the Brandon Curling Club in Brandon, Manitoba.

Results:

Men's	W	L
Black Group
Kyle Doering (West Kildonan)	6	1
Tanner Lott (Petersfield)	6	1
Cole Peters (West St. Paul)	5	2
Nathaniel Swanson (Heather)	4	3
Austin Mustard (Portage)	2	5
J. T. Ryan (Assiniboine Memorial)	2	5
Randy Greig (Deer Lodge)	2	5
Carter Watkins (Swan River)	1	6
Red Group
Daniel Birchard (Pembina)	7	0
Matt Dunstone (St. Vital)	6	1
Braden Calvert (Carberry)	4	3
Curtis Kaatz (Springfield)	4	3
Jordan Smith (East St. Paul)	3	4
Sean Davidson (Portage)	3	4
Colin Kurz (Wildewood)	1	6
Steffan Adamchuk (Swan River)	0	7

Women's	W	L
Black Group
Beth Peterson (Victoria)	6	1
Selena Kaatz (St. Vital)	6	1
Rachel Burtnyk (Assiniboine Memorial)	5	2
Christine Mackay (Wildewood)	3	4
Jennifer Curle (Minnedosa)	3	4
Jesse Iles (The Pas)	3	4
Abby Ackland (Victoria)	2	5
Raina Syrnyk (Gilbert Plains)	0	7
Red Group
Shannon Birchard (Pembina)	7	0
Kristy Watling (Victoria)	6	1
Alyssa Vandepoele (Victoria)	4	3
Rebecca Lamb (Stonewall)	4	3
Kayla Curtis (La Salle)	3	4
Kylin Alm (Dauphin)	2	5
Carly Angers (Miami)	1	6
Janelle Schwindt (Brandon)	1	6

- Men's B1 vs R1: Birchard 7, Doering 2
- Men's B2 vs R2: Dunstone 9, Lott 7
- Men's semi final: Dunstone 7, Doering 6
- Men's final: Dunstone 8, Birchard 7
- Women's B1 vs R1: Birchard 4, Peterson 3
- Women's B2 vs R2: Kaatz 6, Watling 3
- Women's semi final: Kaatz 7, Peterson 3
- Women's final: Birchard 7, Kaatz 6

=== Saskatchewan ===
- The Junior Provincial Championships were held January 3–7 at the Weyburn Curling Club in Weyburn

Results:

Men's	W	L
Pool A
Brady Scharback (Sutherland)	5	0
Cole Tenetuik (Granite)	4	1
Kris Keating (Benson)	3	2
Travis Tokarz (Weyburn)	2	3
Zachary Turner (CN)	1	4
Allan Walter (Sutherland)	0	5
Pool B
Daniel Selke (Tartan)	4	1
Jeremy Vanderbuhs (Granite)	4	1
Jayden Schwaga (Langenburg)	3	2
Lucas Richards (Assiniboia)	3	2
Scott Loyns (Lanigan)	1	4
Dallas Burnett (Langham)	0	5

Women's	W	L
Pool A
Kristen Streifel (Nutana)	4	1
Lorraine Schneider (Callie)	4	1
Alexandra Williamson (Callie)	4	1
Allyson Grywacheski (Callie)	1	4
Ashley Skjerdal (Callie)	1	4
Danielle Bertsch (Sutherland)	1	4
Pool B
Jessica Hanson (Granite)	4	1
Katherine Michaluk (Callie)	4	1
Brooke Tokarz (Nutana)	3	2
Malysha Johnstone (Moose Jaw)	2	3
Nicole Thompson (Callie)	2	3
Alison Ingram (St Wallburg)	0	5

- Men's A1 vs. B1: Scharback 10, Selke 7
- Men's A2 vs. B2: Tenetuik 6, Vanderbuhs 3
- Men's semi final: Tenetuik 5, Selke 3
- Men's final: Scharback 9, Tenetuik 2
- Women's tie breaker: Schneider 7, Williamson 4
- Women's A1 vs. B1: Streifel 10, Hanson 5
- Women's A2 vs. B2: Schneider 10, Michaluk 7
- Women's semi final: Hanson 7, Schneider 6
- Women's final: Hanson 9, Streifel 8

=== Alberta ===
- The Subway Junior Provincials was held January 9–13 at the Thistle Curling Club in Edmonton

Results:

Men's	W	L
Thomas Scoffin (Saville)	6	1
Daylan Vavrek (Sexsmith)	5	2
Michael Roy (Airdrie)	5	2
Brayden Power (Saville)	3	4
Devin Burkitt (Dawson Creek, BC)	3	4
Aiden Procter (Saville)	2	5
Denton Koch (Medicine Hat)	2	5
Scott Smith (Calgary)	2	5

Women's	W	L
Kelsey Rocque (Saville)	6	1
Karynn Flory (Crestwood)	6	1
Taylore Theroux (Saville)	5	2
Jocelyn Peterman (Red Deer)	4	3
Janais DeJong (Sexsmith)	3	4
Kayla Ramstad (Red Deer)	2	5
Courtney Rossing (Grande Prairie)	1	6
Dacey Brown (Airdrie)	1	6

- Men's semi final: Roy 8, Vavrek 7
- Men's final: Scoffin 5, Roy 4
- Women's semi final: Flory 12, Theroux 2
- Women's final: Flory 7, Rocque 3

=== British Columbia ===
The Tim Hortons Junior Provincial Championships are being held January 2–6 at the Coquitlam Curling Club in Coquitlam, British Columbia.

Results:

Men's	W	L
Tyler Klymchuk (Langley/Victoria)	7	0
Kyle Habkirk (Coquitlam)	6	1
Tyler Tardi (Langley)	5	2
Cameron de Jong (Victoria)	4	3
Duncan Silversides (Victoria)	3	4
Brandon Emslie (Kelowna)	2	5
Paul Henderson (Victoria/Esquimalt)	1	6
Brendan Cliff (Vernon)	0	7

Women's	W	L
Kalia Van Osch (Nanaimo)	7	0
Corryn Brown (Kamloops)	5	2
Shawna Jensen (Richmond)	5	2
Brandi Tinkler (Kamloops)	4	3
Amy Edwards (Vernon)	3	4
Stephanie Prinse (Chilliwack)	3	4
Katherine Silversides (Juan de Fuca)	1	6
Cierra Fisher (Kamloops)	0	7

- Men's semi final: Tardi 7, Habkirk 3
- Men's final: Klymchuk 9, Tardi 4
- Women's semi final: Brown 8, Jensen 3
- Women's final: Brown 7, Van Osch 4

=== Territories ===
- Yukon: Dec 21–23 at the Teslin Curling Club in Teslin
  - Winners:
    - Men: Mitchell Young (Whitehorse) defeated Christopher Nerysoo
    - Women: Sarah Koltun (Whitehorse) defeated Bailey Horte
- Northwest Territories:
  The Junior Men's Provincial Playdowns were held January 3–6 at the Yellowknife Curling Club in Yellowknife

Results:

Men's	W	L
Daniel Murray (Yellowknife)	4	0
Logan Gagnier	2	2
Reid F. J. Tait	0	4

  - Women's winner: Carina McKay-Saturnino of Inuvik will represent the NWT in women's.
- Nunavut:
  - Winners:
    - Women: Sadie Pinksen (Iqaluit)
    - Men: David Kakuktinniq (Rankin Inlet)
