= 2014 Tim Hortons Brier =

- Host city: Kamloops, British Columbia
- Arena: Interior Savings Centre
- Dates: March 1–9
- Attendance: 65,005
- Winner: Alberta
- Curling club: Glencoe CC, Calgary
- Skip: Kevin Koe
- Third: Pat Simmons
- Second: Carter Rycroft
- Lead: Nolan Thiessen
- Alternate: Jamie King
- Coach: John Dunn
- Finalist: British Columbia (John Morris)

The 2014 Tim Hortons Brier was held from March 1 to 9 at the Interior Savings Centre in Kamloops, British Columbia.

Unlike previous years, the winner of the 2014 Brier automatically qualified for the 2015 Brier as Team Canada, similarly to the Scotties Tournament of Hearts.

== Teams ==
The teams are listed as follows:

Alberta	British Columbia	Manitoba	New Brunswick
Glencoe CC, Calgary Skip: Kevin Koe; Third: Pat Simmons; Second: Carter Rycroft; Lead: Nolan Thiessen; Alternate: Jamie King	Vernon CC, Vernon; Kelowna CC, Kelowna Fourth: Jim Cotter; Skip: John Morris; Second: Tyrel Griffith; Lead: Rick Sawatsky; Alternate: Jody Epp	Charleswood CC, Winnipeg Skip: Jeff Stoughton; Third: Jon Mead; Second: Mark Nichols; Lead: Reid Carruthers; Alternate: Garth Smith	Gage G&CC, Oromocto Skip: James Grattan; Third: Jason Roach; Second: Darren Roach; Lead: Josh Barry; Alternate: Andy McCann
Newfoundland and Labrador	Northern Ontario	Nova Scotia	Ontario
Bally Haly G&CC, St. John's Skip: Brad Gushue; Third: Brett Gallant; Second: Adam Casey; Lead: Geoff Walker; Alternate: Jamie Korab	Fort William CC, Thunder Bay Skip: Jeff Currie; Third: Mike McCarville; Second: Colin Koivula; Lead: Jamie Childs; Alternate: Joe Scharf	Lakeshore CC, Lower Sackville Skip: Jamie Murphy; Third: Jordan Pinder; Second: Mike Bardsley; Lead: Donald McDermaid; Alternate: Mark Kehoe	Glendale G&CC, Hamilton Skip: Greg Balsdon; Third: Mark Bice; Second: Tyler Morgan; Lead: Jamie Farnell; Alternate: Steve Bice
Prince Edward Island	Quebec	Saskatchewan	Northwest Territories/Yukon
Charlottetown CC, Charlottetown Skip: Eddie MacKenzie; Third: Anson Carmody; Second: Tyler MacKenzie; Lead: Sean Ledgerwood; Alternate: Phil Gorveatt	CC Etchemin, Saint-Romuald Skip: Jean-Michel Ménard; Third: Martin Crête; Second: Éric Sylvain; Lead: Philippe Ménard; Alternate: Pierre Charette	Nutana CC, Saskatoon Skip: Steve Laycock; Third: Kirk Muyres; Second: Colton Flasch; Lead: Dallan Muyres; Alternate: Matt Lang	Yellowknife CC, Yellowknife Skip: Jamie Koe; Third: Kevin Whitehead; Second: Brad Chorostkowski; Lead: Robert Borden; Alternate: Greg Skauge

== Map of teams ==
Provincial Winners

== Round-robin standings ==
Final round-robin standings

Key
Teams to Playoffs

Locale	Skip	W	L	PF	PA	EW	EL	BE	SE	S%
British Columbia	John Morris	9	2	78	52	44	35	21	9	90%
Alberta	Kevin Koe	9	2	91	48	51	34	11	17	86%
Manitoba	Jeff Stoughton	9	2	78	68	52	46	14	13	88%
Quebec	Jean-Michel Ménard	7	4	79	69	48	42	19	8	86%
Saskatchewan	Steve Laycock	6	5	66	67	44	42	21	7	85%
Newfoundland and Labrador	Brad Gushue	6	5	74	62	48	39	18	9	85%
New Brunswick	James Grattan	6	5	71	79	44	44	12	7	83%
Ontario	Greg Balsdon	5	6	72	75	45	47	12	5	86%
Prince Edward Island	Eddie MacKenzie	4	7	66	84	42	50	9	5	80%
Northwest Territories/Yukon	Jamie Koe	3	8	52	78	38	50	16	6	81%
Northern Ontario	Jeff Currie	2	9	65	82	39	52	14	4	84%
Nova Scotia	Jamie Murphy	0	11	49	83	38	54	11	5	81%

== Relegation ==
Two member associations will be relegated to a pre-qualifier tournament at the beginning of the 2015 Tim Hortons Brier. The two teams with the lowest combined record from the previous three years will join the Yukon and Nunavut in the 2015 qualifying round with one team advancing to the Brier round robin.

Record is from round robin games only

Key
Relegated to 2015 Brier qualifying round

Member Association	2012	2013	2014	Record
Manitoba	8–3	8–3	9–2	25–8
Ontario	10–1	10–1	5–6	25–8
Alberta	8–3	7–4	9–2	24–9
Newfoundland and Labrador	5–6	8–3	6–5	19–14
Quebec	4–7	6–5	7–4	17–16
New Brunswick	5–6	5–6	6–5	16–17
Northwest Territories	7–4	5–6	3–8	15–18
Northern Ontario	5–6	8–3	2–9	15–18
Saskatchewan	3–8	5–6	6–5	14–19
British Columbia	4–7	1–10	9–2	14–19
Prince Edward Island	3–8	2–9	4–7	9–24
Nova Scotia	4–7	1–10	0–11	5–28

== Round-robin results ==
All draw times are listed in Pacific Time.

=== Draw 1 ===
Saturday, March 1, 1:30 pm

Sheet A	1	2	3	4	5	6	7	8	9	10	Final
Prince Edward Island (MacKenzie) 🔨	1	0	1	1	0	0	0	0	2	0	5
Manitoba (Stoughton)	0	2	0	0	1	1	1	1	0	1	7

Sheet B	1	2	3	4	5	6	7	8	9	10	Final
Nova Scotia (Murphy)	0	0	0	1	0	0	1	0	0	X	2
Newfoundland and Labrador (Gushue) 🔨	1	0	1	0	1	0	0	3	1	X	7

Sheet C	1	2	3	4	5	6	7	8	9	10	Final
British Columbia (Morris) 🔨	2	0	0	0	3	0	0	1	0	1	7
Alberta (K. Koe)	0	2	2	0	0	2	0	0	0	0	6

Sheet D	1	2	3	4	5	6	7	8	9	10	Final
New Brunswick (Grattan)	0	0	1	0	2	0	2	0	X	X	5
Northern Ontario (Currie) 🔨	0	5	0	2	0	4	0	2	X	X	13

=== Draw 2 ===
Saturday, March 1, 6:30 pm

Sheet A	1	2	3	4	5	6	7	8	9	10	Final
Northern Ontario (Currie)	0	0	0	0	1	0	1	0	X	X	2
British Columbia (Morris) 🔨	0	3	0	1	0	1	0	3	X	X	8

Sheet B	1	2	3	4	5	6	7	8	9	10	Final
Ontario (Balsdon)	0	2	0	2	0	2	0	1	0	2	9
Quebec (Ménard) 🔨	0	0	2	0	2	0	2	0	1	0	7

Sheet C	1	2	3	4	5	6	7	8	9	10	11	Final
Newfoundland and Labrador (Gushue) 🔨	0	1	1	0	0	2	0	1	0	0	0	5
Manitoba (Stoughton)	0	0	0	1	2	0	0	0	0	2	1	6

Sheet D	1	2	3	4	5	6	7	8	9	10	Final
Northwest Territories/Yukon (J. Koe) 🔨	0	0	0	1	0	2	0	0	2	0	5
Saskatchewan (Laycock)	0	1	1	0	2	0	0	2	0	2	8

=== Draw 3 ===
Sunday, March 2, 8:30 am

Sheet A	1	2	3	4	5	6	7	8	9	10	Final
Quebec (Ménard) 🔨	0	0	0	2	0	3	0	1	0	1	7
Saskatchewan (Laycock)	0	0	0	0	2	0	2	0	1	0	5

Sheet B	1	2	3	4	5	6	7	8	9	10	Final
Alberta (K. Koe)	2	2	5	1	0	0	0	X	X	X	10
New Brunswick (Grattan) 🔨	0	0	0	0	1	0	0	X	X	X	1

Sheet C	1	2	3	4	5	6	7	8	9	10	Final
Ontario (Balsdon) 🔨	2	0	0	0	1	0	0	1	0	0	4
Northwest Territories/Yukon (J. Koe)	0	0	2	0	0	0	2	0	0	1	5

Sheet D	1	2	3	4	5	6	7	8	9	10	Final
Prince Edward Island (MacKenzie) 🔨	1	0	1	0	2	0	1	0	2	X	7
Nova Scotia (Murphy)	0	1	0	1	0	2	0	1	0	X	5

=== Draw 4 ===
Sunday, March 2, 1:30 pm

Sheet A	1	2	3	4	5	6	7	8	9	10	Final
Newfoundland and Labrador (Gushue) 🔨	0	2	0	1	0	1	0	1	1	0	6
Ontario (Balsdon)	0	0	1	0	3	0	1	0	0	2	7

Sheet B	1	2	3	4	5	6	7	8	9	10	11	Final
Northwest Territories/Yukon (J. Koe)	0	2	0	0	0	1	2	0	0	1	0	6
Manitoba (Stoughton) 🔨	1	0	1	1	1	0	0	0	2	0	1	7

Sheet C	1	2	3	4	5	6	7	8	9	10	Final
Saskatchewan (Laycock)	0	0	2	0	1	0	0	1	1	1	6
Northern Ontario (Currie) 🔨	0	1	0	1	0	0	2	0	0	0	4

Sheet D	1	2	3	4	5	6	7	8	9	10	Final
Quebec (Ménard) 🔨	4	0	0	1	0	0	1	0	1	X	7
British Columbia (Morris)	0	1	0	0	0	2	0	1	0	X	4

=== Draw 5 ===
Sunday, March 2, 6:30 pm

Sheet A	1	2	3	4	5	6	7	8	9	10	Final
Manitoba (Stoughton) 🔨	0	0	1	1	0	2	0	0	0	5	9
New Brunswick (Grattan)	0	0	0	0	1	0	2	1	1	0	5

Sheet B	1	2	3	4	5	6	7	8	9	10	Final
Northern Ontario (Currie)	0	2	0	0	0	3	0	2	0	X	7
Prince Edward Island (MacKenzie) 🔨	2	0	0	2	2	0	2	0	2	X	10

Sheet C	1	2	3	4	5	6	7	8	9	10	Final
Nova Scotia (Murphy)	0	4	0	1	0	0	0	0	1	0	6
British Columbia (Morris) 🔨	1	0	1	0	1	1	1	0	0	3	8

Sheet D	1	2	3	4	5	6	7	8	9	10	Final
Alberta (K. Koe) 🔨	3	1	0	1	0	2	0	2	X	X	9
Newfoundland and Labrador (Gushue)	0	0	1	0	2	0	1	0	X	X	4

=== Draw 6 ===
Monday, March 3, 1:30 pm

Sheet A	1	2	3	4	5	6	7	8	9	10	Final
Alberta (K. Koe)	0	0	4	0	1	0	2	1	X	X	8
Northwest Territories/Yukon (J. Koe) 🔨	1	0	0	1	0	1	0	0	X	X	3

Sheet B	1	2	3	4	5	6	7	8	9	10	Final
Nova Scotia (Murphy) 🔨	0	0	1	0	0	2	0	0	0	X	3
Saskatchewan (Laycock)	0	0	0	2	1	0	0	0	2	X	5

Sheet C	1	2	3	4	5	6	7	8	9	10	Final
Quebec (Ménard) 🔨	2	0	1	0	1	0	0	1	1	0	6
Prince Edward Island (MacKenzie)	0	2	0	1	0	2	0	0	0	2	7

Sheet D	1	2	3	4	5	6	7	8	9	10	Final
Ontario (Balsdon)	0	1	0	0	1	0	2	0	2	0	6
New Brunswick (Grattan) 🔨	2	0	2	1	0	1	0	2	0	1	9

=== Draw 7 ===
Monday, March 3, 6:30 pm

Sheet A	1	2	3	4	5	6	7	8	9	10	Final
Nova Scotia (Murphy) 🔨	0	2	0	0	1	1	1	1	0	0	6
Northern Ontario (Currie)	2	0	2	3	0	0	0	0	1	1	9

Sheet B	1	2	3	4	5	6	7	8	9	10	Final
Manitoba (Stoughton)	0	1	0	2	0	1	0	0	X	X	4
Alberta (K. Koe) 🔨	1	0	3	0	1	0	1	4	X	X	10

Sheet C	1	2	3	4	5	6	7	8	9	10	Final
New Brunswick (Grattan)	0	0	3	0	2	0	1	0	1	0	7
Newfoundland and Labrador (Gushue) 🔨	0	2	0	3	0	1	0	2	0	1	9

Sheet D	1	2	3	4	5	6	7	8	9	10	Final
British Columbia (Morris) 🔨	1	0	0	2	0	2	0	2	3	X	10
Prince Edward Island (MacKenzie)	0	1	0	0	1	0	2	0	0	X	4

=== Draw 8 ===
Tuesday, March 4, 8:30 am

Sheet A	1	2	3	4	5	6	7	8	9	10	Final
Saskatchewan (Laycock) 🔨	2	0	0	1	0	1	0	2	0	1	7
Newfoundland and Labrador (Gushue)	0	0	1	0	1	0	3	0	1	0	6

Sheet B	1	2	3	4	5	6	7	8	9	10	Final
British Columbia (Morris) 🔨	0	0	2	1	0	0	0	4	X	X	7
Northwest Territories/Yukon (J. Koe)	0	0	0	0	1	0	1	0	X	X	2

Sheet C	1	2	3	4	5	6	7	8	9	10	Final
Northern Ontario (Currie) 🔨	1	0	1	0	0	1	0	2	0	X	5
Ontario (Balsdon)	0	1	0	2	1	0	2	0	2	X	8

Sheet D	1	2	3	4	5	6	7	8	9	10	11	Final
Manitoba (Stoughton)	0	2	2	1	0	0	0	0	2	0	0	7
Quebec (Ménard) 🔨	4	0	0	0	0	0	1	0	0	2	2	9

=== Draw 9 ===
Tuesday, March 4, 1:30 pm

Sheet A	1	2	3	4	5	6	7	8	9	10	Final
New Brunswick (Grattan)	0	0	2	0	1	0	0	0	X	X	3
British Columbia (Morris) 🔨	0	2	0	1	0	3	0	3	X	X	9

Sheet B	1	2	3	4	5	6	7	8	9	10	Final
Prince Edward Island (MacKenzie)	0	2	0	0	2	0	0	1	0	X	5
Newfoundland and Labrador (Gushue) 🔨	2	0	0	4	0	0	1	0	1	X	8

Sheet C	1	2	3	4	5	6	7	8	9	10	Final
Manitoba (Stoughton)	0	2	0	2	0	2	0	0	1	3	10
Nova Scotia (Murphy) 🔨	2	0	2	0	1	0	1	0	0	0	6

Sheet D	1	2	3	4	5	6	7	8	9	10	Final
Northern Ontario (Currie)	0	0	1	0	0	1	1	0	0	X	3
Alberta (K. Koe) 🔨	2	1	0	1	3	0	0	0	2	X	9

=== Draw 10 ===
Tuesday, March 4, 6:30 pm

Sheet A	1	2	3	4	5	6	7	8	9	10	Final
Ontario (Balsdon) 🔨	3	1	0	0	1	0	3	X	X	X	8
Prince Edward Island (MacKenzie)	0	0	0	2	0	1	0	X	X	X	3

Sheet B	1	2	3	4	5	6	7	8	9	10	11	Final
Quebec (Ménard)	0	1	0	2	0	2	0	2	0	1	0	8
New Brunswick (Grattan) 🔨	2	0	2	0	1	0	2	0	1	0	2	10

Sheet C	1	2	3	4	5	6	7	8	9	10	Final
Alberta (K. Koe)	0	0	2	0	2	1	0	1	2	X	8
Saskatchewan (Laycock) 🔨	0	1	0	2	0	0	2	0	0	X	5

Sheet D	1	2	3	4	5	6	7	8	9	10	Final
Nova Scotia (Murphy) 🔨	1	0	1	0	0	0	1	0	1	X	4
Northwest Territories/Yukon (J. Koe)	0	2	0	1	1	1	0	2	0	X	7

=== Draw 11 ===
Wednesday, March 5, 8:00 am

Sheet A	1	2	3	4	5	6	7	8	9	10	Final
Northern Ontario (Currie) 🔨	0	1	0	2	0	0	1	0	2	0	6
Manitoba (Stoughton)	2	0	2	0	0	1	0	3	0	1	9

Sheet B	1	2	3	4	5	6	7	8	9	10	Final
Alberta (K. Koe) 🔨	0	3	0	1	0	1	0	1	1	X	7
Nova Scotia (Murphy)	1	0	0	0	1	0	1	0	0	X	3

Sheet C	1	2	3	4	5	6	7	8	9	10	Final
Prince Edward Island (MacKenzie)	0	0	1	0	1	0	1	0	X	X	3
New Brunswick (Grattan) 🔨	3	2	0	2	0	1	0	0	X	X	8

Sheet D	1	2	3	4	5	6	7	8	9	10	Final
Newfoundland and Labrador (Gushue)	0	0	0	1	0	0	1	0	1	X	3
British Columbia (Morris) 🔨	0	2	0	0	2	0	0	1	0	X	5

=== Draw 12 ===
Wednesday, March 5, 1:00 pm

Sheet A	1	2	3	4	5	6	7	8	9	10	11	Final
Newfoundland and Labrador (Gushue) 🔨	0	2	0	0	1	1	0	0	2	0	4	10
Quebec (Ménard)	0	0	1	2	0	0	0	1	0	2	0	6

Sheet B	1	2	3	4	5	6	7	8	9	10	Final
Ontario (Balsdon) 🔨	0	1	0	1	0	0	0	1	X	X	3
British Columbia (Morris)	0	0	5	0	1	2	0	0	X	X	8

Sheet C	1	2	3	4	5	6	7	8	9	10	11	Final
Northwest Territories/Yukon (J. Koe)	0	0	1	0	1	1	0	1	1	0	2	7
Northern Ontario (Currie) 🔨	0	1	0	1	0	0	1	0	0	2	0	5

Sheet D	1	2	3	4	5	6	7	8	9	10	Final
Saskatchewan (Laycock)	0	1	0	1	0	0	1	0	1	0	4
Manitoba (Stoughton) 🔨	2	0	1	0	1	0	0	2	0	1	7

=== Draw 13 ===
Wednesday, March 5, 6:30 pm

Sheet A	1	2	3	4	5	6	7	8	9	10	Final
Northwest Territories/Yukon (J. Koe)	0	1	0	1	0	1	0	0	X	X	3
New Brunswick (Grattan) 🔨	2	0	2	0	1	0	2	1	X	X	8

Sheet B	1	2	3	4	5	6	7	8	9	10	Final
Saskatchewan (Laycock) 🔨	1	0	2	0	2	1	0	0	2	X	8
Prince Edward Island (MacKenzie)	0	2	0	2	0	0	1	0	0	X	5

Sheet C	1	2	3	4	5	6	7	8	9	10	Final
Nova Scotia (Murphy) 🔨	0	0	2	0	1	0	0	0	X	X	3
Quebec (Ménard)	2	1	0	1	0	2	0	2	X	X	8

Sheet D	1	2	3	4	5	6	7	8	9	10	Final
Alberta (K. Koe) 🔨	2	0	1	1	0	3	0	1	2	X	10
Ontario (Balsdon)	0	1	0	0	2	0	2	0	0	X	5

=== Draw 14 ===
Thursday, March 6, 8:30 am

Sheet B	1	2	3	4	5	6	7	8	9	10	Final
Newfoundland and Labrador (Gushue) 🔨	0	1	0	0	2	0	2	1	0	1	7
Northern Ontario (Currie)	0	0	0	2	0	2	0	0	2	0	6

Sheet C	1	2	3	4	5	6	7	8	9	10	11	Final
British Columbia (Morris) 🔨	2	0	1	0	1	0	1	0	0	1	0	6
Manitoba (Stoughton)	0	2	0	1	0	1	0	2	0	0	1	7

=== Draw 15 ===
Thursday, March 6, 1:30 pm

Sheet A	1	2	3	4	5	6	7	8	9	10	Final
Prince Edward Island (MacKenzie)	0	1	0	3	0	0	0	1	1	0	6
Alberta (K. Koe) 🔨	4	0	2	0	0	1	1	0	0	1	9

Sheet B	1	2	3	4	5	6	7	8	9	10	Final
Northwest Territories/Yukon (J. Koe) 🔨	0	0	1	0	0	2	0	0	2	0	5
Quebec (Ménard)	1	1	0	2	0	0	2	0	0	1	7

Sheet C	1	2	3	4	5	6	7	8	9	10	11	Final
Saskatchewan (Laycock)	0	0	2	2	0	0	1	0	2	0	1	8
Ontario (Balsdon) 🔨	0	4	0	0	1	0	0	1	0	1	0	7

Sheet D	1	2	3	4	5	6	7	8	9	10	Final
New Brunswick (Grattan)	0	0	2	2	0	0	1	0	1	0	6
Nova Scotia (Murphy) 🔨	0	1	0	0	1	1	0	1	0	1	5

=== Draw 16 ===
Thursday, March 6, 6:30 pm

Sheet A	1	2	3	4	5	6	7	8	9	10	Final
British Columbia (Morris) 🔨	0	2	0	0	2	0	1	1	0	X	6
Saskatchewan (Laycock)	0	0	1	0	0	1	0	0	1	X	3

Sheet B	1	2	3	4	5	6	7	8	9	10	Final
Manitoba (Stoughton)	0	2	0	2	1	0	0	2	0	1	8
Ontario (Balsdon) 🔨	3	0	1	0	0	1	0	0	1	0	6

Sheet C	1	2	3	4	5	6	7	8	9	10	Final
Newfoundland and Labrador (Gushue) 🔨	0	2	1	0	2	0	2	0	2	X	9
Northwest Territories/Yukon (J. Koe)	0	0	0	1	0	1	0	0	0	X	2

Sheet D	1	2	3	4	5	6	7	8	9	10	Final
Quebec (Ménard) 🔨	0	1	0	2	0	0	3	0	0	1	7
Northern Ontario (Currie)	0	0	2	0	1	0	0	0	1	0	4

=== Draw 17 ===
Friday, March 7, 8:30 am

Sheet A	1	2	3	4	5	6	7	8	9	10	Final
Ontario (Balsdon)	0	2	0	1	1	1	0	2	0	2	9
Nova Scotia (Murphy) 🔨	2	0	2	0	0	0	1	0	1	0	6

Sheet B	1	2	3	4	5	6	7	8	9	10	Final
New Brunswick (Grattan) 🔨	2	0	1	0	1	0	0	0	2	3	9
Saskatchewan (Laycock)	0	2	0	2	0	0	0	3	0	0	7

Sheet C	1	2	3	4	5	6	7	8	9	10	Final
Quebec (Ménard)	0	0	1	0	3	0	2	0	1	X	7
Alberta (K. Koe) 🔨	0	1	0	1	0	2	0	1	0	X	5

Sheet D	1	2	3	4	5	6	7	8	9	10	Final
Northwest Territories/Yukon (J. Koe) 🔨	1	0	2	0	0	1	0	0	3	0	7
Prince Edward Island (MacKenzie)	0	1	0	2	1	0	2	2	0	3	11

== Playoffs ==
Page playoff system
1	British Columbia	9
2	Alberta	5
3	Manitoba	6
4	Quebec	7

Semifinal
2	Alberta	9
4	Quebec	8

Final
1	British Columbia	5
2	Alberta	10

Bronze Medal Game
4	Quebec	5
3	Manitoba	9

=== 1 vs. 2 ===
Friday, March 7, 6:30 pm

Team	1	2	3	4	5	6	7	8	9	10	Final
British Columbia (Morris) 🔨	2	1	0	3	0	2	0	0	1	X	9
Alberta (K. Koe)	0	0	1	0	2	0	1	1	0	X	5

Player percentages
British Columbia		Alberta	
Rick Sawatsky	88%	Nolan Thiessen	89%
Tyrel Griffith	97%	Carter Rycroft	81%
John Morris	93%	Pat Simmons	88%
Jim Cotter	86%	Kevin Koe	83%
Total	91%	Total	85%

=== 3 vs. 4 ===
Saturday, March 8, 1:30 pm

Team	1	2	3	4	5	6	7	8	9	10	Final
Manitoba (Stoughton) 🔨	0	2	0	0	0	0	2	0	1	1	6
Quebec (Ménard)	0	0	2	0	1	2	0	2	0	0	7

Player percentages
Manitoba		Quebec	
Reid Carruthers	93%	Philippe Ménard	87%
Mark Nichols	88%	Éric Sylvain	93%
Jon Mead	81%	Martin Crête	93%
Jeff Stoughton	80%	Jean-Michel Ménard	86%
Total	85%	Total	90%

=== Semifinal ===
Saturday, March 8, 6:30 pm

Team	1	2	3	4	5	6	7	8	9	10	11	Final
Alberta (K. Koe) 🔨	2	0	2	0	2	0	0	1	1	0	1	9
Quebec (Ménard)	0	2	0	1	0	1	2	0	0	2	0	8

Player percentages
Alberta		Quebec	
Nolan Thiessen	91%	Philippe Ménard	86%
Carter Rycroft	94%	Éric Sylvain	90%
Pat Simmons	85%	Martin Crête	85%
Kevin Koe	79%	Jean-Michel Ménard	72%
Total	87%	Total	83%

=== Bronze medal game ===
Sunday, March 9, 9:00 am

Team	1	2	3	4	5	6	7	8	9	10	Final
Quebec (Ménard)	0	0	0	0	1	0	2	2	0	X	5
Manitoba (Stoughton) 🔨	2	2	1	2	0	1	0	0	1	X	9

Player percentages
Quebec		Manitoba	
Philippe Ménard	96%	Reid Carruthers	100%
Philippe Ménard	96%	Garth Smith	75%
Éric Sylvain	88%	Mark Nichols	96%
Martin Crête	86%	Jon Mead	94%
Pierre Charette	94%	Jon Mead	94%
Jean-Michel Ménard	55%	Jeff Stoughton	72%
Total	85%	Total	88%

=== Final ===
Sunday, March 9, 4:30 pm

Team	1	2	3	4	5	6	7	8	9	10	Final
British Columbia (Morris) 🔨	2	0	0	1	0	1	0	1	0	X	5
Alberta (K. Koe)	0	3	0	0	3	0	3	0	1	X	10

Player percentages
British Columbia		Alberta	
Rick Sawatsky	99%	Nolan Thiessen	88%
Tyrel Griffith	94%	Carter Rycroft	96%
John Morris	75%	Pat Simmons	83%
Jim Cotter	82%	Kevin Koe	92%
Total	88%	Total	90%

2014 Tim Hortons Brier
(Alberta)
Alberta
26th Canadian Men's Curling Championship title

== Statistics ==
=== Top 5 player percentages ===
Round robin only

Leads	%
(British Columbia) Rick Sawatsky	95
(Quebec) Philippe Ménard	90
(Ontario) Jamie Farnell	90
(Newfoundland and Labrador) Geoff Walker	89
(New Brunswick) Josh Barry	88

Seconds	%
(Manitoba) Mark Nichols	90
(British Columbia) Tyrel Griffith	88
(Alberta) Carter Rycroft	86
(Ontario) Tyler Morgan	85
(Northern Ontario) Colin Koivula	85

Thirds	%
(British Columbia) John Morris	89
(Manitoba) Jon Mead	88
(Alberta) Pat Simmons	86
(Quebec) Martin Crête	86
(Ontario) Mark Bice	85

Fourths	%
(British Columbia) Jim Cotter	87
(Manitoba) Jeff Stoughton	86
(Alberta) Kevin Koe	85
(Newfoundland and Labrador) Brad Gushue	85
(Quebec) Jean-Michel Ménard	84

=== Perfect games ===
Player	Team	Position	Shots	Opponent
Jamie Childs	Northern Ontario	Lead	20	Prince Edward Island
Nolan Thiessen	Alberta	Lead	15	Newfoundland and Labrador
Nolan Thiessen	Alberta	Lead	16	Northwest Territories/Yukon
Rick Sawatsky	British Columbia	Lead	18	Prince Edward Island
Rick Sawatsky	British Columbia	Lead	16	New Brunswick
Rick Sawatsky	British Columbia	Lead	16	Ontario
Reid Carruthers	Manitoba	Lead	10	Quebec

== Awards ==
The awards and all-star teams are listed as follows:

All-Star Teams

First Team

- Fourth: Jim Cotter, British Columbia
- Third: John Morris, British Columbia
- Second: Mark Nichols, Manitoba
- Lead: Rick Sawatsky, British Columbia

Second Team

- Skip: Kevin Koe, Alberta
- Third: Pat Simmons, Alberta
- Second: Tyrel Griffith, British Columbia
- Lead: Philippe Ménard, Quebec

Ross Harstone Sportsmanship Award

- Greg Balsdon, Ontario skip

Scotty Harper Award

- Bob Weeks, Ontario Curling Report, for his tribute to Shorty Jenkins

Paul McLean Award

- Andy Bouyoukos, director of TSN's curling broadcasts

Hec Gervais Most Valuable Player Award

- Carter Rycroft, Alberta second

== Provincial and territorial playdowns ==
- 2014 Boston Pizza Cup (Alberta)
- (British Columbia) 2014 Canadian Direct Insurance BC Men's Curling Championship
- 2014 Safeway Championship (Manitoba)
- (New Brunswick) 2014 Molson Canadian Men's Provincial Curling Championship
- 2014 Newfoundland and Labrador Tankard
- (Northern Ontario) 2014 Travelers Men's NOCA Provincials
- 2014 Molson Coors Tankard (Nova Scotia)
- 2014 Travelers Tankard (Ontario)
- (Prince Edward Island) 2014 PEI Tankard
- 2014 Quebec Men's Provincial Curling Championship
- 2014 SaskTel Tankard (Saskatchewan)
- (Northwest Territories) 2014 Yukon/NWT Men's Curling Championship
