= Wade Verge =

Canadian politician

Speaker of the House of Assembly
- In office September 5, 2014 – December 14, 2015
- Preceded by: Ross Wiseman
- Succeeded by: Tom Osborne

Member of the House of Assembly
- In office November 1, 2007 – November 27, 2015
- Preceded by: Tom Rideout
- Succeeded by: District Abolished
- Constituency: Lewisporte

Personal details
- Party: Progressive Conservative
- Education: Memorial University

Wade Verge is a politician in Newfoundland and Labrador, Canada. Verge represented the district of Lewisporte in the Newfoundland and Labrador House of Assembly from 2007 until 2015. He was a member of the Progressive Conservative Party.

Verge was formerly an educator and served as the principal at New World Island Academy of New World Island.

In September 2009, Verge spoke out against his own government's cutbacks to health care in his district. Premier Danny Williams dismissed Verge's comments, saying that "he didn't understand that that's what it meant", and that, "for what it's worth, he's entitled to his opinion." Verge was later booed at a rally against the cuts after he reversed his position and sided with the government, although he stated he also supported the people of his district. On October 7, Premier Williams appointed a new Minister of Health and Community Services. Joined by the new minister in Lewisporte on October 14, Verge stated, "Government is looking harder and digging deeper to try and find a solution to the problem. ...Hopefully at the end of the day we will be able to deliver all the services that the people want coming out of Lewisporte." The government subsequently reversed its decision to remove laboratory and X-ray services from Lewisporte. He was Speaker of the House of Assembly from 2014 until 2015.

== Electoral record ==
2011 Newfoundland and Labrador general election
Party	Candidate	Votes	%	±%
Progressive Conservative	Wade Verge	2450	56.60%	–
NDP	Lloyd Snow	988	22.82%	
Liberal	Todd Manuel	891	20.58%	

2007 Newfoundland and Labrador general election
Party	Candidate	Votes	%	±%
Progressive Conservative	Wade Verge	2660	70.61%	–
Liberal	Jack Martin	647	17.18%	
NDP	Garry Vatcher	460	12.21%	
