= Jamie Korab =

Canadian curler and politician (born 1979)

The Honourable Jamie Korab ONL ECNL MHA
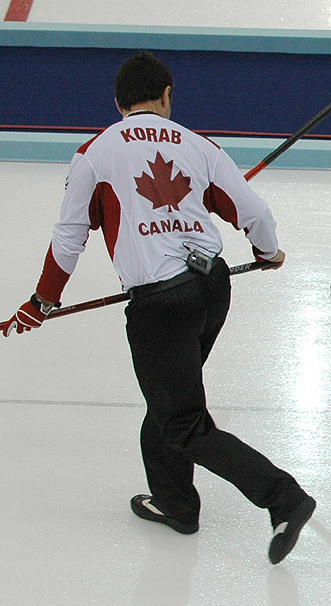

Minister Responsible for NL Housing and Minister of Seniors
- In office August 15, 2025 – October 14, 2025
- Preceded by: John Abbott
- Succeeded by: Joedy Wall

Minister of Families and Affordability, Minister Responsible for the Status of Persons with Disabilities, Minister Responsible for the Community Sector
- In office May 9, 2025 – August 15, 2025
- Preceded by: position established
- Succeeded by: Bernard Davis

Member of the Newfoundland and Labrador House of Assembly for Waterford Valley
- Incumbent
- Assumed office August 22, 2024
- Preceded by: Tom Osborne

Personal details
- Born: November 28, 1979 (age 46) Harbour Grace, Newfoundland, Canada
- Party: Liberal
- Profession: Politician; Realtor; Athlete

Curling career

Team
- Curling club: Bally Haly Golf & Curling Club

Curling career
- Brier: 8 (2003, 2004, 2005, 2007, 2009, 2010, 2013, 2014)
- Top CTRS ranking: 4th (2008–09)
- Grand Slam victories: 1: The National (2010)
Medal record
Men's curling
Representing Canada
Winter Olympics
Gold medal – first place	2006 Turin
Canadian Olympic Curling Trials
Gold medal – first place	2005 Halifax
World Junior Curling Championships
Gold medal – first place	2001 Ogden
Representing Newfoundland and Labrador
Tim Hortons Brier
Silver medal – second place	2007 Hamilton

Jamie Arthur Korab, ONL (born November 28, 1979, in Harbour Grace, Newfoundland) is a Canadian curler and politician. He was elected to the Newfoundland and Labrador House of Assembly for the Liberal Party in the 2024 Waterford Valley provincial by-election. Korab was the lead for the gold medal-winning Canadian men's team at the 2006 Winter Olympics skipped by Brad Gushue. Prior to provincial politics, Korab served on St. John's City Council representing Ward 3 from 2017 to 2024.

== Career ==
Korab played in two Canadian Junior Curling Championships and three Briers before playing at the Olympics.

At the 1997 Canadian Juniors, he played as a third for Randy Turpin. At the 2000 Canadian Juniors, he joined up Gushue as his second and they went all the way to the junior finals that year, losing to British Columbia's Brad Kuhn in the final. It was his last year as juniors, so he had to leave the team, but rejoined them for the 2003 Nokia Brier. He would play as Gushue's second once again at the 2004 Nokia Brier and moved back to his lead at the 2005 Tim Hortons Brier. In 2005, the team added two-time world champion Russ Howard at second, which gave them a victory at the Canadian Olympic trials and a berth to the 2006 Olympic Games, where they won the gold medal, defeating Finland's Markku Uusipaavalniemi 10–4 in the final.

On April 5, 2007, it was officially announced that Korab was cut from the Gushue rink during a team meeting the night before. The move was said to be due to a team chemistry issue and not reflective of his curling ability. According to an interview aired on NTV news on April 5, 2007, there is speculation on Korab's part that the move may have been at least somewhat motivated by a verbal exchange between Korab and skip Brad Gushue some time before. It is also possible there was an issue between Korab and Chris Schille, the team's new second as of the beginning of the 2006–07 season.

For the 2007–08 curling season, Korab played second on a team consisting of Olympic teammate Mike Adam, Ryan LeDrew and Mark Noseworthy.

In April 2008, Brad Gushue announced that Korab would once again be a part of his team for the 2008–09 curling season. In 2010, after two seasons with Gushue, winning a Grand Slam of Curling and finishing a disappointing 4th at the 2009 & 2010 Briers, Korab decided to take some time off from curling. He helped to coach Heather Strong's rink from St. John's from the 2010–13 season. The team won the NL provincials and participated in the 2012 Scotties Tournament of Hearts in Red Deer. Korab's wife (Stephanie) was also on that team.

Korab was brought on to be Gushue's alternate at the 2013 Tim Hortons Brier and the 2014 Tim Hortons Brier.

== Politics ==
In 2013, Korab ran for the Liberal Party of Newfoundland and Labrador's nomination in the riding of Carbonear-Harbour Grace for a by-election held there. Before the by-election was held, Korab withdrew from the race.

In 2017, Korab announced his intention to run in the St. John's municipal election to represent Ward 3 of the city on the St. John's City Council. He was easily elected, winning 63% of the vote. He was re-elected in 2021, with 47% of the vote.

On July 23, 2024, Korab was acclaimed as the Liberal Party of Newfoundland and Labrador candidate in the riding of Waterford Valley after the resignation of incumbent Liberal MHA Tom Osborne. The Waterford Valley provincial by-election was scheduled for August 22, 2024.

On August 22, 2024, Korab won the Waterford Valley provincial by-election and became a sitting Liberal MHA.

In the 2025 Liberal Party of Newfoundland and Labrador leadership election, Korab endorsed John Hogan.

On May 9, 2025, Korab was appointed Minister of Families and Affordability.

On August 15, 2025, Korab was appointed Minister of Seniors and Minister Responsible for Newfoundland and Labrador Housing Corporation.

Korab was re-elected in the 2025 Newfoundland and Labrador general election.

== Personal life ==
Korab attended St. Francis High School. He is currently a Real Estate Agent with RE/MAX in St. John's.

Korab is married to Stephanie Korab, and the couple had their first child in 2013. It was the birth of his child that motivated Korab to step back from full-time professional curling in order to spend more time with family.

Korab is involved with many charities and currently sits on the board of directors for Kids Eat Smart.

== Electoral record ==
2025 Newfoundland and Labrador general election: Waterford Valley
Party	Candidate	Votes	%	±%
Liberal	Jamie Korab	2,527	47.20	+1.44
Progressive Conservative	David Thomlyn	1,467	27.40	-4.10
New Democratic	Nicole Boland	1,360	25.40	+2.67
Total valid votes		5,354		
Total rejected ballots				
Turnout				
Eligible voters				
Liberal hold		Swing		+2.77

Newfoundland and Labrador provincial by-election, August 22, 2024 Resignation of Tom Osborne
Party	Candidate	Votes	%	±%
Liberal	Jamie Korab	2,067	45.76	-21.03
Progressive Conservative	Jesse Wilkins	1,423	31.50	+6.43
New Democratic	Nicole Boland	1,027	22.74	+14.60
Total valid votes		4,517		
Total rejected ballots				
Turnout				
Eligible voters				

2021 St. John's city council election
Candidate	Vote	%
Ward 3
Jamie Korab (X)	3,109	46.55
Greg Noseworthy	2,687	40.23
Walter Harding	883	13.22

2017 St. John's city council election
Candidate	Vote	%
Jamie Korab	5,079	63.02
Peter McDonald	1,710	21.22
Walter Harding	1,270	15.76

== Awards ==
- Brier: Second Team All-Star, Second – 2004
