= Josh Barry =

Canadian curler (born 1992)

- Curler
- Born: June 20, 1992 (age 34); Fredericton, New Brunswick

Team
- Curling club: Capital Winter Club, Fredericton, NB

Curling career
- Member Association: New Brunswick (2009–14; 2015–17); Prince Edward Island (2014–15; 2017–18); British Columbia (2018–19)
- Brier: 3 (2014, 2015, 2018)
- Top CTRS ranking: 12th (2014–15)
Medal record
Curling
Representing Canada
World Junior Championships
Bronze medal – third place	2013 Sochi

Josh Barry (born June 20, 1992 in Fredericton, New Brunswick) is a Canadian curler.

== Career ==
=== Juniors ===
Barry is a four-time New Brunswick junior champion, winning provincial championships between 2010 and 2013. At the 2010 Canadian Junior Curling Championships, he skipped his New Brunswick team of Chris Sleep, Blake Hunter and Alex Kyle to a 5–7 record. At the 2011 Canadian Junior Curling Championships, Barry threw fourth stones on a team skipped by Jon Rennie. That team went 8–4 in round robin play, and lost in a tiebreaker against Newfoundland and Labrador. At the 2012 Canadian Junior Curling Championships, Barry was back to skipping. He led his team of Kerry MacLean, Chris MacRae and Andrew O'Dell to a 5–7 record. At the 2013 Canadian Junior Curling Championships, he led his team of Rene Comeau, Spencer Watts and O'Dell to a 6–4 record, just missing the playoffs.

Barry was invited to be the alternate for Team Canada (skipped by Matt Dunstone) at the 2013 World Junior Curling Championships. Barry played in one game, and brought home a bronze medal as part of the team.

=== Men's ===
After juniors, Barry joined the James Grattan rink as lead. In their first season together on the World Curling Tour, the team won the Curling Masters Champéry. Later in the season, the team won the 2014 Molson Canadian Men's Provincial Curling Championship, Barry's first men's provincial tournament. The team represented New Brunswick at the 2014 Tim Hortons Brier, going 6–5.

Following the 2013–14 season, Barry moved to Charlottetown to play for the Adam Casey rink, playing third on the team. The team won the 2015 PEI Tankard, and represented Prince Edward Island at the 2015 Tim Hortons Brier. There, the team had to make it through the pre-qualifying tournament, squeaking through based on a pre-game draw to the button. In the main tournament the team finished with a 5–6 record. That season, the team played in two Grand Slam events, The National and the Canadian Open, failing to qualify in either event. That same season, Barry skipped the University of New Brunswick curling team at the 2015 CIS/CCA Curling Championships. He led his rink of Andrew Burgess, Alex Robichaud and Alex Sutherland to a 1–6 record.

Barry left the team after the Casey rink after just one season to form a rink out of New Brunswick. Barry next made it to the New Brunswick provincial championship at the 2017 Pepsi Tankard, skipping a team of Rene Comeau, Andrew Burgess and Robert Daley. They finished the event with a 3–4 record. Barry then joined the Eddie MacKenzie rink at third, curling out of Charlottetown once again, and living in Halifax, Nova Scotia. The team won the 2018 PEI Tankard, and represented the province at the 2018 Tim Hortons Brier, where they went 2-5 after group play.

After the 2017–18 season, Barry was on the road again forming a new team based in Vancouver.
