= Freeman White (politician) =

Canadian broadcaster and politician (1946–2022)

Freeman Joseph Ward White (May 14, 1946 – December 3, 2022) was a broadcaster and politician in Newfoundland. He represented Lewisporte from 1975 to 1982 in the Newfoundland House of Assembly.

The son of Kenneth White and Ida Pryor, he was born in Newstead and was educated in Comfort Cove and at Memorial University. Before his career in political office, he was a radio news reporter and news director at CJON in St. John's. In 1975, White married Roma Butler. They had two children, Philip and Ashley.

He was elected to the Newfoundland Assembly in 1975. and was re-elected in 1979.
