= Waterford Valley =

Provincial electoral district in Newfoundland and Labrador, Canada

Newfoundland and Labrador electoral district
- Location in the St. John's area

Provincial electoral district
- Legislature: Newfoundland and Labrador House of Assembly
MHA
Jamie Korab
Liberal
- District created: 2015
- First contested: 2015
- Last contested: 2025

Demographics
- Population (2011): 14,601
- Electors (2015): 9,907
- Area (km²): 70
- Census division: Division No. 1
- Census subdivision: St. John's (part)

Waterford Valley is a provincial electoral district in Newfoundland and Labrador, Canada, which is represented by one member in the Newfoundland and Labrador House of Assembly. It was contested for the first time in the 2015 provincial election. It was created out of parts of St. John's South, Kilbride and Ferryland.

The riding is located in the southern part of St. John's, encompassing the neighbourhoods of Blackhead, Bowring Park, Freshwater Bay, Kilbride, Shea Heights, Southside, and part of Waterford Valley.

On July 5, 2024, Tom Osborne resigned. The by-election to replace him occurred on August 22, and was won by Jamie Korab.

== Members of the House of Assembly ==
The district has elected the following members of the House of Assembly:

| Assembly | Years | Member | Party |
|---|---|---|---|
Riding created from Ferryland, Kilbride, and St. John's South.
| 48th | 2015–2019 | Tom Osborne | Liberal |
| 49th | 2019–2021 | Tom Osborne | Liberal |
| 50th | 2021–2024 | Tom Osborne | Liberal |
| 50th | 2024–2025 | Jamie Korab | Liberal |
| 51st | 2025–present | Jamie Korab | Liberal |

== Election results ==
Graph of election results (minor parties that never got 2% of the vote or didn't run consistently are omitted) View source data.

2025 Newfoundland and Labrador general election
| Party | Candidate | Votes | % | ±% |
|---|---|---|---|---|
| Liberal | Jamie Korab | 2,527 | 47.20 | +1.44 |
| Progressive Conservative | David Thomlyn | 1,467 | 27.40 | -4.10 |
| New Democratic | Nicole Boland | 1,360 | 25.40 | +2.67 |
| Total valid votes | | 5,354 | | |
| Total rejected ballots | | | | |
| Turnout | | | | |
| Eligible voters | | | | |
| Liberal hold | | Swing | | +2.77 |

Newfoundland and Labrador provincial by-election, August 22, 2024 Resignation of Tom Osborne
| Party | Candidate | Votes | % | ±% |
|---|---|---|---|---|
| Liberal | Jamie Korab | 2,067 | 45.76 | -21.03 |
| Progressive Conservative | Jesse Wilkins | 1,423 | 31.50 | +6.44 |
| New Democratic | Nicole Boland | 1,027 | 22.74 | +14.59 |
| Total valid votes | | 4,517 | 99.87 | |
| Total rejected ballots | | 6 | 0.13 | -0.73 |
| Turnout | | 4,523 | 43.04 | -9.76 |
| Eligible voters | | 10,508 | | |
| Liberal hold | | Swing | | -13.73 |

2021 Newfoundland and Labrador general election
| Party | Candidate | Votes | % | ±% |
|---|---|---|---|---|
| Liberal | Tom Osborne | 3,592 | 66.79 | -1.77 |
| Progressive Conservative | Michael Holden | 1,348 | 25.07 | |
| New Democratic | Peter Young | 438 | 8.14 | -23.29 |
| Total valid votes | | 5,378 | 99.13 | |
| Total rejected ballots | | 47 | 0.87 | -1.42 |
| Turnout | | 5,425 | 52.80 | +0.26 |
| Eligible voters | | 10,274 | | |
| Liberal hold | | Swing | | -13.42 |
Source(s) "Officially Nominated Candidates General Election 2021" (PDF). Elections Newfoundland and Labrador. "2021 Provincial General Election Report" (PDF).

2019 Newfoundland and Labrador general election
| Party | Candidate | Votes | % | ±% |
|---|---|---|---|---|
| Liberal | Tom Osborne | 3,487 | 68.56 | +2.63 |
| New Democratic | Matthew Cooper | 1,599 | 31.44 | +11.92 |
| Total valid votes | | 5,086 | 97.71 | |
| Total rejected ballots | | 119 | 2.29 | +1.79 |
| Turnout | | 5,205 | 52.52 | -2.66 |
| Electors on the lists | | 9,906 | – | |
Source: Elections Newfoundland and Labrador
| Liberal hold | | Swing | | -4.65 |

2015 Newfoundland and Labrador general election
| Party | Candidate | Votes | % |
|---|---|---|---|
| Liberal | Tom Osborne | 3,588 | 65.93 |
| New Democratic | Alison Coffin | 1,062 | 19.51 |
| Progressive Conservative | Alison Stoodley | 792 | 14.55 |
| Total valid votes | | 5,442 | 99.51 |
| Total rejected ballots | | 27 | 0.49 |
| Turnout | | 5,469 | 55.20 |
| Eligible voters | | 9,907 | |
Source: Elections Newfoundland and Labrador

== See also ==
- List of Newfoundland and Labrador provincial electoral districts
- Canadian provincial electoral districts
