= 2024 Waterford Valley provincial by-election =

Provincial by-election in Newfoundland, Canada

← 2021	August 22, 2024	2025 →

Riding of Waterford Valley
- Turnout: 42.64% (▼10.16)
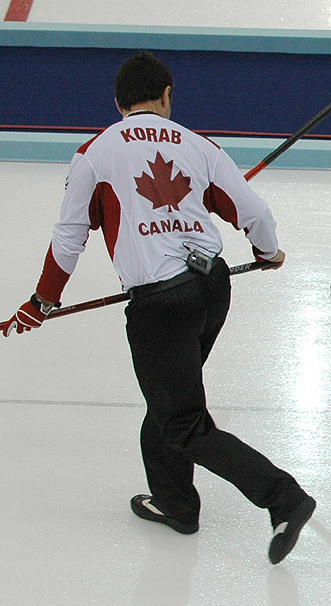
	First party	Second party	Third party
		PC	NDP
Candidate	Jamie Korab	Jesse Wilkins	Nicole Boland
Party	Liberal	Progressive Conservative	New Democratic
Last election	66.79%	25.07%	8.14%
Popular vote	2,067	1,423	1,027
Percentage	45.76%	31.50%	22.74%
Swing	▼21.03	▲6.44	▲14.59
MHA before election
Tom Osborne
Liberal
Elected MHA
Jamie Korab
Liberal

A by-election was held in the provincial riding of Waterford Valley in Newfoundland on August 22, 2024, to elect a new member of the Newfoundland and Labrador House of Assembly following the resignation of Liberal MHA and cabinet minister Tom Osborne.

The seat was won by Liberal candidate and former Olympic curler Jamie Korab.

== Background ==
Tom Osborne, who had served in the legislature since 1996, resigned as health minister and MHA in July 2024.

Osborne represented Waterford Valley since the riding's creation in 2015. Prior to that, he represented St. John's South which covered part of what is now Waterford Valley. He was a member of the Progressive Conservative Party until becoming an Independent in 2012. In 2013, he crossed the floor to join the Liberals.

== Candidates ==
- Jamie Korab (Liberal) - St. John's city councillor, Olympic gold medallist curler.
- Nicole Boland (New Democratic) - social worker and mental health advocate.
- Jesse Wilkins (Progressive Conservative) defeated Kevin Guest for the nomination. He is a retired police officer.

== Results ==
Jamie Korab was elected.

Newfoundland and Labrador provincial by-election, August 22, 2024 Resignation of Tom Osborne
Party	Candidate	Votes	%	±%
Liberal	Jamie Korab	2,067	45.76	-21.03
Progressive Conservative	Jesse Wilkins	1,423	31.50	+6.44
New Democratic	Nicole Boland	1,027	22.74	+14.59
Total valid votes		4,517		
Total rejected ballots				
Turnout			42.64	-10.16
Eligible voters		10,593		
Liberal hold		Swing		-13.73

== 2021 result ==
2021 Newfoundland and Labrador general election: Waterford Valley
Party	Candidate	Votes	%	±%
Liberal	Tom Osborne	3,592	66.79	-1.77
Progressive Conservative	Michael Holden	1,348	25.07	
New Democratic	Peter Young	438	8.14	-23.29
Total valid votes		5,378	99.13	
Total rejected ballots		47	0.87	-1.42
Turnout		5,425	52.80	+0.26
Eligible voters		10,274		
Liberal hold		Swing		-13.42
Source(s) "Officially Nominated Candidates General Election 2021" (PDF). Elections Newfoundland and Labrador. "2021 Provincial General Election Report" (PDF).

== See also ==
- List of Newfoundland and Labrador by-elections
