= Margaret Cameron (jurist) =

Margaret A. Cameron is a Canadian jurist and current Justice of the Supreme Court of Newfoundland and Labrador (Court of Appeal).

Cameron was a rumoured candidate to replace Supreme Court of Canada Justice Michel Bastarache. If appointed, Cameron would have been the first Newfoundlander and Labradorian to sit on the High Court.

In 2008, Cameron led the Commission of Inquiry into Hormone Receptor Testing, known as the Cameron Inquiry, a public inquiry into health care for the province of Newfoundland and Labrador.

Cameron received a BA from Memorial University of Newfoundland in 1967, an LLB from Dalhousie University in 1971, and was called to the Bar of Newfoundland and Labrador in 1972. She practiced with Thoms, Fowler, Rowe and Barry from 1972 to 1975, and from 1975 to 1981 was a solicitor with the Department of Justice in the Government of Newfoundland and Labrador, from January 1981 to September 1983 serving as Associate Deputy Minister there. She was appointed to the Supreme Court of Newfoundland and Labrador in September 1983, was presiding judge of the Unified Family Court until September 1985, and served in the Trial Division until May 1992 when she was appointed a judge of the Court of Appeal.
