= 2014 Molson Canadian Men's Provincial Curling Championship =

- Host city: Moncton, New Brunswick
- Arena: Curl Moncton
- Dates: February 5 – 9
- Winner: Team Grattan
- Curling club: Gage G&CC, Oromocto
- Skip: James Grattan
- Third: Jason Roach
- Second: Darren Roach
- Lead: Josh Barry
- Finalist: Marc Lecocq

The 2014 Molson Canadian Men's Provincial Curling Championship, the provincial men's curling championship for New Brunswick was held from February 5 to 9 at Curl Moncton in Moncton, New Brunswick. The winning James Grattan rink represented New Brunswick at the 2014 Tim Hortons Brier in Kamloops, British Columbia.

== Teams ==
The teams are listed as follows:

Skip	Third	Second	Lead	Locale
Paul Dobson	Kevin Boyle	Mark Dobson	Spencer Mawhinney	Thistle St. Andrews CC, Saint John
James Grattan	Jason Roach	Darren Roach	Josh Barry	Gage G&CC, Oromocto
Brody Hanson	Chris Smith	Chris McCann	Adam McAloney	Gage G&CC, Oromocto
Marc Lecocq	Andy McCann	Scott Jones	Jamie Brannen	Nackawic CC, Nackawic
Shane Longley	Marcel Robichaud	Marc Belliveau	Scott Nealis	Curl Moncton, Moncton
Shaun Mott	Ryan McCann	David Nowlan	Nick McCann	Gladstone CC, Fredericton Junction
Terry Odishaw	Grant Odishaw	Rick Perron	Dan Phillips	Curl Moncton, Moncton
Wayne Tallon	Mike Kennedy	Mike Flannery	Dan Crouse	Capital WC, Fredericton

== Round Robin standings ==
Final Round Robin standings

Key
Teams to Playoffs

Skip	W	L	W–L	PF	PA	EW	EL	BE	SE
James Grattan	6	1	1–0	52	33	30	25	5	12
Marc Lecocq	6	1	0–1	52	38	30	29	5	8
Shane Longley	4	3	–	46	40	28	25	5	7
Paul Dobson	3	4	1–1	50	40	31	24	0	12
Shaun Mott	3	4	1–1	37	44	25	28	4	6
Terry Odishaw	3	4	1–1	49	48	29	27	3	9
Wayne Tallon	2	5	–	38	44	26	27	6	5
Brody Hanson	1	6	–	28	65	17	31	1	1

== Round Robin results ==
All draw times listed in Atlantic Time (UTC−04:00).

=== Draw 1 ===
Wednesday, February 5, 2:00 pm

Sheet 6	1	2	3	4	5	6	7	8	9	10	Final
Marc Lecocq 🔨	2	1	0	2	0	0	0	1	0	2	8
Shane Longley	0	0	3	0	1	0	2	0	1	0	7

Sheet 7	1	2	3	4	5	6	7	8	9	10	Final
Shaun Mott 🔨	2	0	2	0	2	0	2	0	0	1	9
Wayne Tallon	0	2	0	1	0	2	0	1	2	0	8

Sheet 8	1	2	3	4	5	6	7	8	9	10	Final
Terry Odishaw 🔨	0	1	0	2	0	0	0	0	2	1	6
James Grattan	0	0	2	0	0	1	2	2	0	0	7

Sheet 9	1	2	3	4	5	6	7	8	9	10	Final
Brody Hanson 🔨	1	0	0	2	0	0	1	0	0	X	4
Paul Dobson	0	1	1	0	3	1	0	2	1	X	9

=== Draw 2 ===
Wednesday, February 5, 7:00 pm

Sheet 6	1	2	3	4	5	6	7	8	9	10	Final
Brody Hanson	0	0	0	0	3	X	X	X	X	X	3
James Grattan 🔨	3	4	3	1	0	X	X	X	X	X	11

Sheet 7	1	2	3	4	5	6	7	8	9	10	Final
Paul Dobson	1	0	0	2	1	2	0	0	3	0	9
Terry Odishaw 🔨	0	2	3	0	0	0	3	1	0	1	10

Sheet 8	1	2	3	4	5	6	7	8	9	10	Final
Wayne Tallon	0	1	0	6	0	1	X	X	X	X	8
Shane Longley 🔨	1	0	2	0	1	0	X	X	X	X	4

Sheet 9	1	2	3	4	5	6	7	8	9	10	Final
Shaun Mott 🔨	1	0	1	0	2	0	0	0	1	X	5
Marc Lecocq	0	2	0	2	0	1	1	1	0	X	7

=== Draw 3 ===
Thursday, February 6, 2:00 pm

Sheet 6	1	2	3	4	5	6	7	8	9	10	Final
Paul Dobson	1	1	2	4	X	X	X	X	X	X	8
Shaun Mott 🔨	0	0	0	0	X	X	X	X	X	X	0

Sheet 7	1	2	3	4	5	6	7	8	9	10	Final
Shane Longley 🔨	1	0	2	0	0	0	1	0	0	X	4
James Grattan	0	2	0	1	3	1	0	1	0	X	8

Sheet 8	1	2	3	4	5	6	7	8	9	10	Final
Brody Hanson	0	1	0	3	0	1	X	X	X	X	5
Marc Lecocq 🔨	3	0	4	0	4	0	X	X	X	X	11

Sheet 9	1	2	3	4	5	6	7	8	9	10	Final
Wayne Tallon 🔨	1	0	1	0	1	0	0	0	1	0	4
Terry Odishaw	0	2	0	1	0	2	0	0	0	1	6

=== Draw 4 ===
Thursday, February 6, 7:00 pm

Sheet 6	1	2	3	4	5	6	7	8	9	10	Final
Wayne Tallon	1	0	1	0	1	0	0	0	1	0	4
Brody Hanson 🔨	0	2	0	1	0	2	0	0	0	1	6

Sheet 7	1	2	3	4	5	6	7	8	9	10	Final
Terry Odishaw 🔨	1	0	0	0	2	1	1	0	1	0	6
Marc Lecocq	0	0	0	2	0	0	0	3	0	3	8

Sheet 8	1	2	3	4	5	6	7	8	9	10	Final
James Grattan	0	2	1	0	2	1	0	1	0	X	7
Shaun Mott 🔨	1	0	0	1	0	0	1	0	1	X	4

Sheet 9	1	2	3	4	5	6	7	8	9	10	Final
Shane Longley	0	2	0	0	0	0	2	1	0	1	6
Paul Dobson 🔨	2	0	2	0	0	0	0	0	1	0	5

=== Draw 5 ===
Friday, February 7, 2:00 pm

Sheet 6	1	2	3	4	5	6	7	8	9	10	Final
Shane Longley 🔨	2	0	0	2	0	2	0	2	1	X	9
Terry Odishaw	0	0	2	0	1	0	2	0	0	X	5

Sheet 7	1	2	3	4	5	6	7	8	9	10	Final
Brody Hanson	0	1	0	0	0	0	0	0	X	X	1
Shaun Mott 🔨	2	0	0	0	1	2	1	2	X	X	8

Sheet 8	1	2	3	4	5	6	7	8	9	10	11	Final
Marc Lecocq	0	2	0	2	0	2	0	0	0	1	1	8
Paul Dobson 🔨	2	0	2	0	1	0	1	1	0	0	0	7

Sheet 9	1	2	3	4	5	6	7	8	9	10	Final
James Grattan 🔨	0	0	2	0	0	1	0	1	0	0	4
Wayne Tallon	0	0	0	1	0	0	2	0	2	1	6

=== Draw 6 ===
Friday, February 7, 7:00 pm

Sheet 6	1	2	3	4	5	6	7	8	9	10	Final
James Grattan 🔨	0	1	0	0	3	0	3	0	2	X	9
Paul Dobson	1	0	2	0	0	1	0	1	0	X	5

Sheet 7	1	2	3	4	5	6	7	8	9	10	Final
Marc Lecocq 🔨	0	1	2	0	0	0	1	0	2	X	6
Wayne Tallon	1	0	0	1	1	0	0	0	0	X	3

Sheet 8	1	2	3	4	5	6	7	8	9	10	Final
Shane Longley	1	1	3	0	1	0	0	2	X	X	8
Shaun Mott 🔨	0	0	0	0	0	1	1	0	X	X	2

Sheet 9	1	2	3	4	5	6	7	8	9	10	Final
Terry Odishaw 🔨	1	0	1	5	0	3	2	X	X	X	12
Brody Hanson	0	0	0	0	3	0	0	X	X	X	3

=== Draw 7 ===
Saturday, February 7, 9:00 am

Sheet 6	1	2	3	4	5	6	7	8	9	10	Final
Shaun Mott 🔨	2	0	0	0	2	2	0	1	0	2	9
Terry Odishaw	0	3	0	1	0	0	1	0	0	0	5

Sheet 7	1	2	3	4	5	6	7	8	9	10	Final
Brody Hanson	0	0	1	0	1	0	1	1	0	X	4
Shane Longley 🔨	0	3	0	2	0	2	0	0	1	X	8

Sheet 8	1	2	3	4	5	6	7	8	9	10	Final
Paul Dobson 🔨	1	0	1	0	1	0	0	4	X	X	7
Wayne Tallon	0	1	0	1	0	0	1	0	X	X	3

Sheet 9	1	2	3	4	5	6	7	8	9	10	Final
Marc Lecocq 🔨	0	0	1	0	0	1	0	1	1	1	5
James Grattan	1	1	0	2	1	0	1	0	0	0	6

== Playoffs ==
Semifinal			Final
			1	James Grattan	8
2	Marc Lecocq	9	2	Marc Lecocq	7
3	Shane Longley	7

=== Semifinal ===
Saturday, February 8, 8:00 pm

Sheet 7	1	2	3	4	5	6	7	8	9	10	Final
Marc Lecocq 🔨	1	1	0	2	0	3	1	0	0	1	9
Shane Longley	0	0	2	0	3	0	0	1	1	0	7

=== Final ===
Sunday, February 9, 2:00 pm

Sheet 8	1	2	3	4	5	6	7	8	9	10	Final
James Grattan 🔨	0	0	0	2	0	2	1	2	1	0	8
Marc Lecocq	2	1	1	0	2	0	0	0	0	1	7

2014 Molson Canadian Men's Provincial Curling Championship

James Grattan
11th New Brunswick Provincial Championship title
