= Cameron Inquiry =

Canadian public judicial inquiry

The Cameron Inquiry, formerly the Commission of Inquiry on Hormone Receptor Testing, is a Canadian public judicial inquiry into the conduct of the Newfoundland and Labrador Eastern Health authority. The inquiry is investigating whether Eastern Health was at fault in the reporting of erroneous and delayed test results to breast cancer patients between 1997 and 2005, and in then failing to report the full scope of these errors. The inquiry developed ramifications for regional and national politics as the opposition Liberal Party questioned why the regional Progressive Conservative Party government had not intervened sooner in the crisis, and said that former deputy health minister Robert Thompson, who had been appointed to chair the inquiry, should stand down, prompting Newfoundland and Labrador premier Danny Williams to accuse the Liberals of a smear campaign. The inquiry, chaired by Justice Margaret Cameron, was called in May 2007 and released a report in March 2009.

== Background ==
In May 2005 Eastern Health discovered errors in hormone receptor breast cancer test results from a histology lab in St. John's, Newfoundland. The tests were designed to register patients' hormone levels, and determine whether they could benefit from potentially life-saving hormone oncology treatments. The board commissioned the re-testing of results from up to 1,500 patients and alerted the office of premier Danny Williams of this development and of potential ensuing media interest. An hour after first contacting Williams's office, the board sent a second message with what communications director Karen Matthews described to the inquiry as a "stand-down" notice, saying the issue had been minimized; Matthews responded by withdrawing the office from high alert over the case. Former health minister John Ottenheimer told the inquiry that he wished to publicize the testing failures when they emerged in May 2005, but deferred to Eastern Health's request that he leave them to handle the affair internally.

After retesting, Eastern Health concluded that 386 patients had received erroneous results, of whom 117 required a change to their treatment programs In December 2006 the board held a series of media briefings on the hormone receptor test errors, downplaying the seriousness and extent of the problems.

Despite the apparent conclusiveness of the inquiry report, epidemiological evidence to support such conclusions is lacking. The testing errors are expected in medical practice, and retesting of tissues over long period of time remains a controversial exercise due to the following factors leading to bias: 1. fluid state of medical technology 2. change in medical practice patterns and criteria for test interpretation 3. effects of prevalence in diagnostic testing. If one examines the test performed in 1998 using the technology of 2008, the inherited time bias is unavoidable. Nevertheless, even despite these biases, the clinical epidemiology of medical testing robustly predicts the expected test errors (due to test characteristics rather than due to problems with test performance) and these are closely matching the observed errors uncovered by Cameron Inquiry.

Any medical test with 90% sensitivity and 90% specificity (and this was declared as a standard performance of ER and PR test in breast cancer in 2010 by ASCO) will not be expected to result in only 10% of false negative and 10% of false positive results. The expected test errors are subject to effect of prevalence in medical testing. Actual prevalence of ER positive breast cancer is in a range of 80%. By re-testing negative results the pathologists, in fact, tried to determine negative predictive value (NPV) of the test (i.e. derive how many negative test results were true negative against reference laboratory). NPV is not a fixed or stable parameter of the test, as it will change with prevalence (interested readers can be referred to Bayesian methods in diagnostic testing). By making simple NPV formula calculations using the above listed test parameters one can derive negative predictive value of only about 60 - 65% (for a 90% sensitive and 90% specific test under condition of 80% prevalence of ER positive breast cancers in North American population). The expected error (false negative results) under such condition of prevalence will be close to 35-40% (1- negative predictive value).

Formula

Negative predictive value =  True negative/ (Total tested negative)   x 100, %

This should not be confused with the fixed parameters of test performance - sensitivity and specificity.

Reference : Hunink M. et al. Decision Analysis in Health and Medicine, 2012.

== Press reports ==
In May 2007 the Canadian Broadcasting Company (CBC) published reports showing that Eastern Health knew the error rate for the screening tests to have been around 42%, considerably higher than the figure they disclosed in the December 2006 media briefings.

The provincial government then called a judicial inquiry, commencing November 2007, into Eastern Health's actions.

== Conduct of the inquiry ==
The inquiry saw dozens of witnesses between November 2007 and October 2008. In May 2008 the provincial government questioned the length of time the inquiry was taking, with justice minister Jerome Kennedy suggesting that continuing with the tone, style, and procedure of the inquiry could cause the health system to collapse. Chair Margaret Cameron declined the government's application to prevent inquiry lawyers from cross-examining witnesses, which had been presented as an attempt to expedite the inquiry.

Opposition leader Yvonne Jones accused premier Williams of trying to "undermine" the inquiry by questioning testimony and witness examination procedures, including one occasion on which Williams described the inquiry in May 2008 as a "witch hunt." Jones also said that former deputy health minister Robert Thompson, a Progressive Conservative who had been commissioned to oversee the inquiry, had a conflict of interest and should stand down. Williams responded critically to what he called an attempt by Jones to smear senior public health officials.

Peter Dawe of the Canadian Cancer Society objected to Williams's perceived attempts to speed up the inquiry, saying that patients deserved a full investigation however long it took.

== Inquiry report ==
The inquiry finished hearing testimony in October 2008 and was due to report by March 1, 2009.

== Lawsuit ==
In 2007, after the revelation that Eastern Health had deliberately concealed the scope of the testing errors, hundreds of patients filed a class action lawsuit against Eastern Health over the affair. A $17.5 million settlement was reached in 2009.

== See also ==
- Margaret Cameron (jurist)
- Health and Community Services Eastern Region
