= 2011 Canadian Junior Curling Championships =

2011 M&M Meat Shops Canadian Junior Curling Championships
- Host city: Calgary, Alberta
- Arena: The Glencoe Club and North Hill Community CC
- Dates: January 29-February 6
- Men's winner: Saskatchewan
- Curling club: Callie CC, Regina
- Skip: Braeden Moskowy
- Third: Kirk Muyres
- Second: Colton Flasch
- Lead: Matt Lang
- Coach: Dwayne Mihalicz
- Finalist: Ontario
- Women's winner: Saskatchewan
- Curling club: Nutana CC, Saskatoon
- Skip: Trish Paulsen
- Third: Kari Kennedy
- Second: Kari Paulsen
- Lead: Natalie Yanko
- Coach: Bob Miller
- Finalist: Alberta

The 2011 M&M Meat Shops Canadian Junior Curling Championships was held January 29-February 6 at The Glencoe Club and at the North Hill Community Curling Club in Calgary, Alberta.

== Men's ==
=== Teams ===
Province / Territory	Skip	Third	Second	Lead
Alberta	Colin Hodgson	Michael Ng	Parker Konschuh	Derek Clark
British Columbia	Jonathan Gardner	Michael Longworth	Michael Hiram	Jonathan Hatten
Manitoba	Sam Good	Riley Smith	Taylor McIntyre	Dillon Bednarek
New Brunswick	Josh Barry	Jon Rennie (skip)	Chris MacRae	Andrew O'Dell
Newfoundland and Labrador	Colin Thomas	Cory Schuh	Chris Ford	Spencer Wicks
Northern Ontario	Cody Johnson	Mike Badiuk	Mark Adams	Mike Makela
Nova Scotia	Kendal Thompson	Cameron MacKenzie	Stuart Thompson	Andrew Komlodi
Northwest Territories	Colin Miller	David Aho	John Murray	Matthew Miller
Ontario	Mathew Camm	Scott Howard	David Mathers	Andrew Hamilton
Prince Edward Island	Spencer Pitre	Matthew Nabuurs	Eric Pidgeon	Connor MacPhee
Quebec	Vincent Bourget	Maxime H. Benoit	Mathieu Westphal	Michaël Fortin
Saskatchewan	Braeden Moskowy	Kirk Muyres	Colton Flasch	Matt Lang
Yukon	Thomas Scoffin	Josh Burns	Mitch Young	Will Mahoney

=== Standings ===
Province / Territory	W	L
Saskatchewan	12	0
Ontario	9	3
Newfoundland and Labrador	8	4
New Brunswick	8	4
Nova Scotia	7	5
Alberta	6	6
Manitoba	6	6
Northern Ontario	5	7
Yukon	5	7
Prince Edward Island	4	8
Northwest Territories	3	9
British Columbia	3	9
Quebec	2	10

=== Scores ===
Draw 1

Sheet A	1	2	3	4	5	6	7	8	9	10	Final
Northwest Territories (Miller)	1	1	0	0	0	0	2	0	0	X	4
Quebec (Bourget)	0	0	1	3	4	1	0	0	1	X	10

Sheet D	1	2	3	4	5	6	7	8	9	10	11	Final
Newfoundland and Labrador (Thomas)	0	0	2	0	0	0	1	1	1	0	1	6
Nova Scotia (Thompson)	2	0	0	0	1	1	0	0	0	1	0	5

Sheet F	1	2	3	4	5	6	7	8	9	10	Final
Prince Edward Island (Pitre)	1	4	0	0	0	0	1	0	2	0	8
New Brunswick (Rennie)	0	0	3	1	1	1	0	2	0	1	9

Sheet H	1	2	3	4	5	6	7	8	9	10	Final
Alberta (Hodgson)	0	2	1	1	0	4	0	3	X	X	11
Northern Ontario (Johnston)	0	0	0	0	2	0	2	0	X	X	4

Sheet I	1	2	3	4	5	6	7	8	9	10	Final
Ontario (Camm)	0	2	0	1	0	0	0	1	0	X	4
Manitoba (Good)	1	0	2	0	0	1	1	0	3	X	8

Sheet L	1	2	3	4	5	6	7	8	9	10	Final
Saskatchewan (Moskowy)	1	1	0	0	2	0	1	0	3	X	8
Yukon (Scoffin)	0	0	1	0	0	1	0	1	0	X	3

Draw 2

Sheet B	1	2	3	4	5	6	7	8	9	10	Final
New Brunswick (Rennie)	1	0	0	0	1	0	0	0	X	X	2
Newfoundland and Labrador (Thomas)	0	2	0	1	0	1	1	3	X	X	8

Sheet C	1	2	3	4	5	6	7	8	9	10	Final
Quebec (Bourget)	2	0	1	0	1	0	1	0	0	X	5
Prince Edward Island (Pitre)	0	3	0	2	0	2	0	1	3	X	11

Sheet E	1	2	3	4	5	6	7	8	9	10	Final
Nova Scotia (Thompson)	2	3	0	0	2	0	2	0	2	X	11
Northwest Territories (Miller)	0	0	1	1	0	1	0	1	0	X	4

Sheet G	1	2	3	4	5	6	7	8	9	10	11	Final
Manitoba (Good)	1	0	0	0	0	1	0	1	1	0	0	4
Alberta (Hodgson)	0	1	0	1	1	0	0	0	0	1	2	6

Sheet I	1	2	3	4	5	6	7	8	9	10	Final
Northern Ontario (Johnston)	0	0	1	0	0	0	1	0	X	X	2
Saskatchewan (Moskowy)	2	1	0	1	1	1	0	0	X	X	6

Sheet K	1	2	3	4	5	6	7	8	9	10	Final
Yukon (Scoffin)	0	0	0	0	0	0	1	0	4	X	5
British Columbia (Gardner)	0	0	1	0	0	0	0	1	0	X	2

Draw 3

Sheet A	1	2	3	4	5	6	7	8	9	10	Final
Newfoundland and Labrador (Thomas)	1	0	3	3	0	2	3	X	X	X	12
Yukon (Scoffin)	0	2	0	0	1	0	0	X	X	X	3

Sheet C	1	2	3	4	5	6	7	8	9	10	Final
Northern Ontario (Johnston)	0	2	0	2	1	1	1	0	1	X	8
Manitoba (Good)	2	0	2	0	0	0	0	1	0	X	5

Sheet E	1	2	3	4	5	6	7	8	9	10	Final
Alberta (Hodgson)	1	2	0	0	2	0	2	0	1	X	8
New Brunswick (Rennie)	0	0	0	1	0	2	0	1	0	X	4

Sheet G	1	2	3	4	5	6	7	8	9	10	Final
Quebec (Bourget)	0	2	0	1	1	0	0	3	0	1	8
British Columbia (Gardner)	3	0	1	0	0	0	2	0	1	0	7

Sheet J	1	2	3	4	5	6	7	8	9	10	Final
Northwest Territories (Miller)	0	0	1	3	0	0	1	0	1	X	6
Saskatchewan (Moskowy)	2	2	0	0	2	1	0	2	0	X	9

Sheet L	1	2	3	4	5	6	7	8	9	10	Final
Prince Edward Island (Pitre)	3	0	1	0	0	2	0	1	0	X	7
Ontario (Camm)	0	3	0	2	4	0	1	0	1	X	11

Draw 4

Sheet B	1	2	3	4	5	6	7	8	9	10	Final
Nova Scotia (Thompson)	1	0	2	1	0	0	1	0	0	1	6
Alberta (Hodgson)	0	1	0	0	1	1	0	1	1	0	5

Sheet C	1	2	3	4	5	6	7	8	9	10	Final
Yukon (Scoffin)	0	0	0	0	0	3	2	0	2	1	8
New Brunswick (Rennie)	1	1	2	1	1	0	0	3	0	0	9

Sheet F	1	2	3	4	5	6	7	8	9	10	Final
Manitoba (Good)	3	0	0	1	0	3	0	1	0	1	9
Newfoundland and Labrador (Thomas)	0	1	1	0	1	0	3	0	1	0	7

Sheet H	1	2	3	4	5	6	7	8	9	10	Final
Ontario (Camm)	2	3	3	1	0	2	3	X	X	X	14
Northwest Territories (Miller)	0	0	0	0	1	0	0	X	X	X	1

Sheet I	1	2	3	4	5	6	7	8	9	10	11	Final
British Columbia (Gardner)	1	0	0	0	2	0	1	0	0	1	1	6
Prince Edward Island (Pitre)	0	1	0	0	0	1	0	2	1	0	0	5

Sheet K	1	2	3	4	5	6	7	8	9	10	Final
Saskatchewan (Moskowy)	0	2	3	0	0	1	1	2	X	X	9
Quebec (Bourget)	1	0	0	0	2	0	0	0	X	X	3

Draw 5

Sheet A	1	2	3	4	5	6	7	8	9	10	Final
New Brunswick (Rennie)	0	1	0	3	1	1	2	X	X	X	8
Manitoba (Good)	0	0	2	0	0	0	0	X	X	X	2

Sheet C	1	2	3	4	5	6	7	8	9	10	11	Final
Alberta (Hodgson)	0	1	0	0	2	1	0	0	2	0	0	6
Newfoundland and Labrador (Thomas)	1	0	1	2	0	0	0	1	0	1	1	7

Sheet F	1	2	3	4	5	6	7	8	9	10	Final
Yukon (Scoffin)	0	1	0	0	2	0	1	0	3	1	8
Nova Scotia (Thompson)	1	0	1	0	0	1	0	1	0	0	4

Sheet H	1	2	3	4	5	6	7	8	9	10	Final
Prince Edward Island (Pitre)	1	0	1	0	0	1	0	X	X	X	3
Saskatchewan (Moskowy)	0	3	0	5	2	0	2	X	X	X	12

Sheet J	1	2	3	4	5	6	7	8	9	10	Final
Quebec (Bourget)	0	0	1	0	1	0	0	X	X	X	2
Ontario (Camm)	3	1	0	1	0	2	5	X	X	X	12

Sheet L	1	2	3	4	5	6	7	8	9	10	Final
Northern Ontario (Johnston)	0	0	1	0	1	1	1	0	1	0	5
British Columbia (Gardner)	3	0	0	2	0	0	0	1	0	1	7

Draw 6

Sheet B	1	2	3	4	5	6	7	8	9	10	Final
Northwest Territories (Miller)	0	2	0	0	3	2	0	0	4	X	11
British Columbia (Gardner)	1	0	1	0	0	0	1	1	0	X	4

Sheet D	1	2	3	4	5	6	7	8	9	10	Final
Ontario (Camm)	0	0	0	0	2	1	0	0	0	0	3
New Brunswick (Rennie)	1	1	1	1	0	0	0	1	0	1	6

Sheet E	1	2	3	4	5	6	7	8	9	10	Final
Prince Edward Island (Pitre)	2	1	0	0	2	0	0	1	0	X	6
Northern Ontario (Johnston)	0	0	4	2	0	0	1	0	1	X	8

Sheet H	1	2	3	4	5	6	7	8	9	10	Final
Newfoundland and Labrador (Thomas)	2	0	1	2	0	0	2	0	X	X	7
Quebec (Bourget)	0	1	0	0	1	0	0	1	X	X	3

Sheet J	1	2	3	4	5	6	7	8	9	10	Final
Yukon (Scoffin)	0	0	0	0	1	4	5	X	X	X	10
Alberta (Hodgson)	1	0	0	0	0	0	0	X	X	X	1

Sheet L	1	2	3	4	5	6	7	8	9	10	11	Final
Manitoba (Good)	0	0	2	0	2	0	1	0	1	1	0	7
Nova Scotia (Thompson)	1	1	0	3	0	1	0	1	0	0	1	8

Draw 7

Sheet B	1	2	3	4	5	6	7	8	9	10	11	Final
Manitoba (Good)	2	0	1	0	2	0	1	0	1	0	0	7
Saskatchewan (Moskowy)	0	2	0	1	0	1	0	1	0	2	1	8

Sheet D	1	2	3	4	5	6	7	8	9	10	Final
Northern Ontario (Johnston)	0	2	0	2	0	1	0	1	0	X	6
Northwest Territories (Miller)	1	0	2	0	3	0	4	0	1	X	11

Sheet E	1	2	3	4	5	6	7	8	9	10	Final
Quebec (Bourget)	1	0	0	1	1	0	0	2	0	0	5
Nova Scotia (Thompson)	0	1	3	0	0	0	1	0	2	1	8

Sheet H	1	2	3	4	5	6	7	8	9	10	Final
New Brunswick (Rennie)	0	1	0	0	0	2	0	1	0	3	7
British Columbia (Gardner)	0	0	1	0	0	0	1	0	1	0	3

Sheet I	1	2	3	4	5	6	7	8	9	10	Final
Alberta (Hodgson)	0	0	1	0	1	0	0	1	1	0	4
Ontario (Camm)	0	0	0	3	0	2	1	0	0	0	6

Sheet K	1	2	3	4	5	6	7	8	9	10	Final
Prince Edward Island (Pitre)	0	1	0	2	1	0	1	0	3	X	8
Newfoundland and Labrador (Thomas)	0	0	2	0	0	0	0	2	0	X	4

Draw 8

Sheet B	1	2	3	4	5	6	7	8	9	10	Final
Quebec (Bourget)	0	2	0	0	0	0	0	1	X	X	3
Northern Ontario (Johnston)	1	0	1	2	1	1	1	0	X	X	7

Sheet D	1	2	3	4	5	6	7	8	9	10	Final
Yukon (Scoffin)	1	0	1	1	1	0	1	0	5	X	10
Prince Edward Island (Pitre)	0	1	0	0	0	1	0	1	0	X	3

Sheet F	1	2	3	4	5	6	7	8	9	10	Final
Northwest Territories (Miller)	0	1	0	0	0	1	0	1	0	X	3
Alberta (Hodgson)	1	0	1	1	0	0	2	0	1	X	6

Sheet G	1	2	3	4	5	6	7	8	9	10	Final
Newfoundland and Labrador (Thomas)	0	0	1	0	2	0	0	0	X	X	3
Ontario (Camm)	1	1	0	2	0	3	1	1	X	X	9

Sheet I	1	2	3	4	5	6	7	8	9	10	Final
Nova Scotia (Thompson)	0	4	0	3	0	0	0	2	0	1	10
New Brunswick (Rennie)	2	0	1	0	0	1	1	0	3	0	8

Sheet K	1	2	3	4	5	6	7	8	9	10	Final
British Columbia (Gardner)	0	1	0	0	1	0	0	X	X	X	2
Saskatchewan (Moskowy)	3	0	1	1	0	5	1	X	X	X	11

Draw 9

Sheet A	1	2	3	4	5	6	7	8	9	10	Final
Prince Edward Island (Pitre)	3	0	1	0	2	0	1	0	0	X	7
Northwest Territories (Miller)	0	0	0	2	0	1	0	1	1	X	5

Sheet D	1	2	3	4	5	6	7	8	9	10	Final
Manitoba (Good)	1	0	3	2	0	0	2	0	2	X	10
Quebec (Bourget)	0	1	0	0	2	1	0	2	0	X	6

Sheet F	1	2	3	4	5	6	7	8	9	10	Final
Northern Ontario (Johnston)	0	0	0	0	0	0	0	3	0	1	4
Yukon (Scoffin)	0	0	0	0	0	1	0	0	1	0	2

Sheet G	1	2	3	4	5	6	7	8	9	10	Final
Saskatchewan (Moskowy)	2	0	1	2	0	0	1	0	3	X	9
New Brunswick (Rennie)	0	2	0	0	1	0	0	1	0	X	4

Sheet J	1	2	3	4	5	6	7	8	9	10	Final
British Columbia (Gardner)	0	1	0	0	1	0	1	0	2	0	5
Newfoundland and Labrador (Thomas)	0	0	3	0	0	2	0	1	0	2	8

Sheet K	1	2	3	4	5	6	7	8	9	10	Final
Ontario (Camm)	0	1	0	1	0	1	1	0	1	0	5
Nova Scotia (Thompson)	0	0	1	0	1	0	0	1	0	0	3

Draw 10

Sheet A	1	2	3	4	5	6	7	8	9	10	Final
Northern Ontario (Johnston)	1	0	3	0	1	0	1	0	1	X	7
Ontario (Camm)	0	2	0	1	0	3	0	4	0	X	10

Sheet C	1	2	3	4	5	6	7	8	9	10	Final
Nova Scotia (Thompson)	2	0	2	0	1	0	1	0	3	X	9
British Columbia (Gardner)	0	1	0	1	0	1	0	1	0	X	4

Sheet E	1	2	3	4	5	6	7	8	9	10	Final
Newfoundland and Labrador (Thomas)	0	0	0	0	0	1	0	1	0	X	2
Saskatchewan (Moskowy)	1	0	0	2	0	0	0	0	2	X	5

Sheet G	1	2	3	4	5	6	7	8	9	10	11	Final
Alberta (Hodgson)	0	2	0	2	0	0	2	0	0	0	1	7
Prince Edward Island (Pitre)	1	0	1	0	0	1	0	1	1	1	0	6

Sheet I	1	2	3	4	5	6	7	8	9	10	Final
Yukon (Scoffin)	0	1	0	1	0	1	3	3	X	X	9
Quebec (Bourget)	0	0	1	0	2	0	0	0	X	X	3

Sheet K	1	2	3	4	5	6	7	8	9	10	Final
Manitoba (Good)	1	0	0	1	1	0	5	1	X	X	9
Northwest Territories (Miller)	0	1	1	0	0	1	0	0	X	X	3

Draw 11

Sheet A	1	2	3	4	5	6	7	8	9	10	Final
Saskatchewan (Moskowy)	5	0	0	2	0	4	0	X	X	X	11
Nova Scotia (Thompson)	0	1	1	0	2	0	1	X	X	X	5

Sheet C	1	2	3	4	5	6	7	8	9	10	Final
New Brunswick (Rennie)	0	0	1	0	3	0	1	0	2	0	7
Northern Ontario (Johnston)	0	0	0	2	0	0	0	3	0	1	6

Sheet E	1	2	3	4	5	6	7	8	9	10	Final
British Columbia (Gardner)	0	0	1	0	0	0	2	0	X	X	3
Ontario (Camm)	1	2	0	1	1	1	0	4	X	X	10

Sheet G	1	2	3	4	5	6	7	8	9	10	Final
Northwest Territories (Miller)	0	0	0	3	1	0	0	0	2	1	7
Yukon (Scoffin)	0	0	2	0	0	0	1	1	0	0	4

Sheet J	1	2	3	4	5	6	7	8	9	10	Final
Prince Edward Island (Pitre)	0	2	0	2	1	1	0	1	1	X	8
Manitoba (Good)	1	0	2	0	0	0	2	0	0	X	5

Sheet L	1	2	3	4	5	6	7	8	9	10	Final
Quebec (Bourget)	0	2	0	0	0	0	1	0	X	X	3
Alberta (Hodgson)	1	0	1	1	3	1	0	1	X	X	10

Draw 12

Sheet A	1	2	3	4	5	6	7	8	9	10	11	Final
Alberta (Hodgson)	0	0	0	1	1	0	0	2	0	1	0	5
British Columbia (Gardner)	1	0	1	0	0	0	2	0	1	0	1	6

Sheet C	1	2	3	4	5	6	7	8	9	10	Final
Ontario (Camm)	2	0	1	2	0	1	0	0	1	0	7
Saskatchewan (Moskowy)	0	2	0	0	1	0	3	2	0	1	9

Sheet E	1	2	3	4	5	6	7	8	9	10	Final
Manitoba (Good)	0	2	0	2	0	2	2	0	1	X	9
Yukon (Scoffin)	0	0	2	0	1	0	0	1	0	X	4

Sheet G	1	2	3	4	5	6	7	8	9	10	Final
Northern Ontario (Johnston)	3	0	2	2	0	1	0	1	0	2	11
Nova Scotia (Thompson)	0	2	0	0	3	0	3	0	2	0	10

Sheet I	1	2	3	4	5	6	7	8	9	10	Final
Northwest Territories (Miller)	0	0	0	1	2	0	0	1	X	X	4
Newfoundland and Labrador (Thomas)	2	1	2	0	0	1	4	0	X	X	10

Sheet K	1	2	3	4	5	6	7	8	9	10	Final
Quebec (Bourget)	0	1	0	2	0	3	0	0	1	0	7
New Brunswick (Rennie)	2	0	2	0	1	0	1	0	0	2	8

Draw 13

Sheet B	1	2	3	4	5	6	7	8	9	10	Final
Yukon (Scoffin)	0	0	1	0	0	0	0	2	X	X	3
Ontario (Camm)	0	2	0	0	0	4	1	0	X	X	7

Sheet D	1	2	3	4	5	6	7	8	9	10	Final
Saskatchewan (Moskowy)	0	1	0	0	1	0	2	0	2	X	6
Alberta (Hodgson)	0	0	1	0	0	1	0	0	0	X	2

Sheet F	1	2	3	4	5	6	7	8	9	10	Final
British Columbia (Gardner)	0	0	2	1	0	0	1	0	0	0	4
Manitoba (Good)	1	0	0	0	1	2	0	0	2	1	7

Sheet H	1	2	3	4	5	6	7	8	9	10	11	Final
Nova Scotia (Thompson)	0	0	1	1	0	3	0	0	1	0	1	7
Prince Edward Island (Pitre)	1	1	0	0	0	0	0	2	0	2	0	6

Sheet J	1	2	3	4	5	6	7	8	9	10	Final
Newfoundland and Labrador (Thomas)	1	1	0	1	0	3	0	0	2	X	8
Northern Ontario (Johnston)	0	0	0	0	1	0	1	0	0	X	2

Sheet L	1	2	3	4	5	6	7	8	9	10	Final
New Brunswick (Rennie)	2	0	0	2	0	2	0	3	0	X	9
Northwest Territories (Miller)	0	1	0	0	1	0	1	0	3	X	6

=== Playoffs ===
Tiebreaker		Semifinal		Final
Newfoundland and Labrador	7
New Brunswick	5	Ontario	6
		Newfoundland and Labrador	4
				Saskatchewan	8
				Ontario	7

==== Tiebreaker ====
Sheet H	1	2	3	4	5	6	7	8	9	10	Final
New Brunswick (Rennie)	0	0	0	1	0	1	1	0	2	0	5
Newfoundland and Labrador (Thomas)	0	0	3	0	2	0	0	1	0	1	7

Player percentages
New Brunswick		Newfoundland and Labrador	
Andrew O'Dell	85%	Spencer Wicks	93%
Chris MacRae	85%	Chris Ford	89%
Jon Rennie	74%	Cory Schuh	86%
Josh Barry	66%	Colin Thomas	88%
Total	78%	Total	89%

==== Semi final ====
Sheet D	1	2	3	4	5	6	7	8	9	10	Final
Ontario (Camm)	0	3	0	0	2	0	0	0	0	1	6
Newfoundland and Labrador (Thomas)	1	0	1	1	0	0	0	0	1	0	4

Player percentages
Ontario		Newfoundland and Labrador	
Andrew Hamilton	91%	Spencer Wicks	96%
David Mathers	90%	Chris Ford	81%
Scott Howard	91%	Cory Schuh	71%
Mat Camm	85%	Colin Thomas	75%
Total	89%	Total	81%

==== Final ====
Sheet D	1	2	3	4	5	6	7	8	9	10	11	Final
Ontario (Camm)	0	0	2	0	0	2	2	0	0	1	0	7
Saskatchewan (Moskowy)	2	1	0	1	1	0	0	0	2	0	1	8

Player percentages
Ontario		Saskatchewan	
Andrew Hamilton	88%	Matt Lang	84%
David Mathers	94%	Colton Flasch	85%
Scott Howard	84%	Kirk Muyres	76%
Mat Camm	76%	Braeden Moskowy	68%
Total	86%	Total	78%

== Women's ==
=== Teams ===
Province / Territory	Skip	Third	Second	Lead
Alberta	Nadine Chyz	Rebecca Pattison	Jessie Scheidegger	Kimberley Anderson
British Columbia	Dailene Sivertson	Jessie Sanderson	Erinn Bartlett	Brandi Tinkler
Manitoba	Breanne Meakin	Briane Meilleur	Erika Sigurdson	Krysten Karwacki
New Brunswick	Jennifer Armstrong	Abby Burgess	Katie Haley	Shelby Wilson
Newfoundland and Labrador	Erin Porter	Tara O'Brien	Jessica Cunningham	Erica Trickett
Northern Ontario	Kendra Lilly	Jennifer Gates	Courtney Chenier	Kim Curtin
Nova Scotia	Sara Spafford	Lindsay Doucet (skip)	Meryn Avery	Ellen Graham
Northwest Territories	Taryn Williams	Janis O'Keefe	Paige Elkin	Katharine Thomas
Ontario	Clancy Grandy	Sarah Wilkes	Laura Crocker	Lynn Kreviazuk
Prince Edward Island	Sarah Fullerton	Michelle McQuaid	Sara MacRae	Whitney Young
Quebec	Alanna Routledge	Kelly Gazdewich	Melanie Maclean	Joëlle St-Hilaire
Saskatchewan	Trish Paulsen	Kari Kennedy	Kari Paulsen	Natalie Yanko
Yukon	Sarah Koltun	Chelsea Duncan	Linea Eby	Jenna Duncan

=== Standings ===
Province / Territory	W	L
Alberta	11	1
Saskatchewan	9	3
Manitoba	8	4
New Brunswick	7	5
British Columbia	7	5
Prince Edward Island	7	5
Northern Ontario	6	6
Yukon	6	6
Ontario	5	7
Newfoundland and Labrador	5	7
Nova Scotia	4	8
Quebec	3	9
Northwest Territories	0	12

=== Scores ===
Draw 1

Sheet B	1	2	3	4	5	6	7	8	9	10	Final
Northwest Territories (Williams)	0	0	0	0	0	0	0	0	X	X	0
Quebec (Routledge)	3	1	1	2	2	2	1	3	X	X	15

Sheet C	1	2	3	4	5	6	7	8	9	10	Final
Newfoundland and Labrador (Porter)	1	0	0	0	2	0	0	2	1	1	7
Nova Scotia (Doucet)	0	0	5	0	0	2	1	0	0	0	8

Sheet E	1	2	3	4	5	6	7	8	9	10	Final
Prince Edward Island (Fullerton)	0	1	1	1	1	0	2	0	0	2	8
New Brunswick (Armstrong)	0	0	0	0	0	1	0	3	1	0	5

Sheet G	1	2	3	4	5	6	7	8	9	10	Final
Alberta (Chyz)	2	2	0	3	0	2	0	X	X	X	9
Northern Ontario (Lilly)	0	0	1	0	1	0	1	X	X	X	3

Sheet J	1	2	3	4	5	6	7	8	9	10	Final
Ontario (Grandy)	0	0	0	2	2	2	0	0	0	0	6
Manitoba (Meakin)	0	2	1	0	0	0	2	1	2	1	9

Sheet K	1	2	3	4	5	6	7	8	9	10	Final
Saskatchewan (Paulsen)	0	0	0	0	2	1	5	2	2	X	12
Yukon (Koltun)	0	2	1	2	0	0	0	0	0	X	5

Draw 2

Sheet A	1	2	3	4	5	6	7	8	9	10	Final
New Brunswick (Armstrong)	1	0	4	0	1	0	1	0	3	X	10
Newfoundland and Labrador (Porter)	0	2	0	0	0	1	0	2	0	X	5

Sheet D	1	2	3	4	5	6	7	8	9	10	Final
Quebec (Routledge)	1	0	2	0	0	1	0	1	2	0	7
Prince Edward Island (Fullerton)	0	0	0	1	2	0	2	0	0	3	8

Sheet F	1	2	3	4	5	6	7	8	9	10	Final
Nova Scotia (Doucet)	2	0	1	0	0	2	4	0	2	X	11
Northwest Territories (Williams)	0	1	0	1	3	0	0	1	0	X	6

Sheet H	1	2	3	4	5	6	7	8	9	10	Final
Manitoba (Meakin)	0	0	0	1	0	0	1	0	X	X	2
Alberta (Chyz)	1	0	5	0	1	1	0	3	X	X	11

Sheet J	1	2	3	4	5	6	7	8	9	10	Final
Northern Ontario (Lilly)	0	0	0	2	0	0	1	0	1	X	4
Saskatchewan (Paulsen)	1	0	1	0	1	3	0	1	0	X	7

Sheet L	1	2	3	4	5	6	7	8	9	10	Final
Yukon (Koltun)	0	2	3	0	0	3	0	2	2	X	12
British Columbia (Sivertson)	1	0	0	2	1	0	1	0	0	X	5

Draw 3

Sheet B	1	2	3	4	5	6	7	8	9	10	Final
Newfoundland and Labrador (Porter)	1	0	0	1	2	0	0	0	1	0	5
Yukon (Koltun)	0	0	1	0	0	1	1	1	0	2	6

Sheet D	1	2	3	4	5	6	7	8	9	10	Final
Northern Ontario (Lilly)	0	2	0	0	0	2	0	2	0	1	7
Manitoba (Meakin)	0	0	1	1	0	0	2	0	2	0	6

Sheet F	1	2	3	4	5	6	7	8	9	10	Final
Alberta (Chyz)	1	4	0	1	2	0	2	X	X	X	10
New Brunswick (Armstrong)	0	0	1	0	0	2	0	X	X	X	3

Sheet H	1	2	3	4	5	6	7	8	9	10	Final
Quebec (Routledge)	0	0	1	0	1	0	3	0	X	X	5
British Columbia (Sivertson)	1	1	0	1	0	3	0	4	X	X	10

Sheet I	1	2	3	4	5	6	7	8	9	10	Final
Northwest Territories (Williams)	0	1	0	1	0	1	0	0	X	X	3
Saskatchewan (Paulsen)	2	0	1	0	5	0	2	3	X	X	13

Sheet K	1	2	3	4	5	6	7	8	9	10	Final
Prince Edward Island (Fullerton)	1	0	0	0	1	0	1	0	1	0	4
Ontario (Grandy)	0	1	0	1	0	1	0	2	0	3	8

Draw 4

Sheet A	1	2	3	4	5	6	7	8	9	10	Final
Nova Scotia (Doucet)	0	2	0	0	1	0	0	X	X	X	3
Alberta (Chyz)	3	0	2	1	0	2	3	X	X	X	11

Sheet D	1	2	3	4	5	6	7	8	9	10	11	Final
Yukon (Koltun)	0	2	1	0	0	0	5	0	1	0	0	9
New Brunswick (Armstrong)	3	0	0	2	0	1	0	1	0	2	1	10

Sheet E	1	2	3	4	5	6	7	8	9	10	Final
Manitoba (Meakin)	0	2	0	0	0	1	0	X	X	X	3
Newfoundland and Labrador (Porter)	2	0	2	2	1	0	5	X	X	X	12

Sheet G	1	2	3	4	5	6	7	8	9	10	Final
Ontario (Grandy)	2	2	1	2	0	3	1	X	X	X	11
Northwest Territories (Williams)	0	0	0	0	1	0	0	X	X	X	1

Sheet J	1	2	3	4	5	6	7	8	9	10	Final
British Columbia (Sivertson)	0	2	0	0	0	2	1	0	2	1	8
Prince Edward Island (Fullerton)	2	0	2	1	1	0	0	1	0	0	7

Sheet L	1	2	3	4	5	6	7	8	9	10	Final
Saskatchewan (Paulsen)	1	0	2	0	1	2	0	0	2	X	8
Quebec (Routledge)	0	1	0	1	0	0	1	1	0	X	4

Draw 5

Sheet B	1	2	3	4	5	6	7	8	9	10	Final
New Brunswick (Armstrong)	1	0	2	1	0	0	3	0	2	0	9
Manitoba (Meakin)	0	5	0	0	2	1	0	2	0	3	13

Sheet D	1	2	3	4	5	6	7	8	9	10	Final
Alberta (Chyz)	2	0	0	3	0	1	5	X	X	X	11
Newfoundland and Labrador (Porter)	0	1	0	0	0	0	0	X	X	X	1

Sheet E	1	2	3	4	5	6	7	8	9	10	Final
Yukon (Koltun)	1	0	1	1	0	1	0	1	1	X	6
Nova Scotia (Doucet)	0	0	0	0	1	0	1	0	0	X	2

Sheet G	1	2	3	4	5	6	7	8	9	10	Final
Prince Edward Island (Fullerton)	0	2	0	0	3	0	1	0	X	X	6
Saskatchewan (Paulsen)	3	0	5	1	0	2	0	2	X	X	13

Sheet I	1	2	3	4	5	6	7	8	9	10	Final
Quebec (Routledge)	0	1	0	1	0	0	0	1	0	X	3
Ontario (Grandy)	0	0	2	0	2	0	1	0	3	X	8

Sheet K	1	2	3	4	5	6	7	8	9	10	11	Final
Northern Ontario (Lilly)	0	0	0	0	2	3	2	0	0	1	0	8
British Columbia (Sivertson)	1	2	1	1	0	0	0	2	1	0	1	9

Draw 6

Sheet A	1	2	3	4	5	6	7	8	9	10	Final
Northwest Territories (Williams)	0	0	1	0	0	1	0	0	0	X	2
British Columbia (Sivertson)	1	2	0	0	1	0	3	4	0	X	11

Sheet C	1	2	3	4	5	6	7	8	9	10	Final
Ontario (Grandy)	0	1	0	1	2	1	0	0	X	X	5
New Brunswick (Armstrong)	2	0	5	0	0	0	1	4	X	X	12

Sheet F	1	2	3	4	5	6	7	8	9	10	Final
Prince Edward Island (Fullerton)	0	3	0	0	2	0	2	0	3	X	10
Northern Ontario (Lilly)	0	0	1	2	0	2	0	1	0	X	6

Sheet G	1	2	3	4	5	6	7	8	9	10	Final
Newfoundland and Labrador (Porter)	1	0	1	0	0	0	2	0	X	X	4
Quebec (Routledge)	0	1	0	1	2	4	0	2	X	X	10

Sheet I	1	2	3	4	5	6	7	8	9	10	Final
Yukon (Koltun)	0	1	1	0	1	0	1	0	0	X	4
Alberta (Chyz)	0	0	0	2	0	1	0	1	2	X	6

Sheet K	1	2	3	4	5	6	7	8	9	10	Final
Manitoba (Meakin)	1	1	1	0	3	3	0	1	X	X	10
Nova Scotia (Doucet)	0	0	0	2	0	0	2	0	X	X	4

Draw 7

Sheet A	1	2	3	4	5	6	7	8	9	10	11	Final
Manitoba (Meakin)	0	1	2	0	1	0	0	2	0	0	1	7
Saskatchewan (Paulsen)	1	0	0	1	0	3	0	0	0	1	0	6

Sheet C	1	2	3	4	5	6	7	8	9	10	Final
Northern Ontario (Lilly)	1	0	2	0	1	0	3	0	1	X	8
Northwest Territories (Williams)	0	1	0	1	0	2	0	1	0	X	5

Sheet F	1	2	3	4	5	6	7	8	9	10	11	Final
Quebec (Routledge)	0	3	1	0	1	0	0	2	0	0	0	7
Nova Scotia (Doucet)	1	0	0	1	0	1	1	0	2	1	1	8

Sheet G	1	2	3	4	5	6	7	8	9	10	Final
New Brunswick (Armstrong)	0	0	3	0	5	2	0	2	1	X	13
British Columbia (Sivertson)	1	3	0	2	0	0	1	0	0	X	7

Sheet J	1	2	3	4	5	6	7	8	9	10	Final
Alberta (Chyz)	0	2	0	4	0	0	2	0	3	X	11
Ontario (Grandy)	2	0	1	0	1	1	0	2	0	X	7

Sheet L	1	2	3	4	5	6	7	8	9	10	Final
Prince Edward Island (Fullerton)	0	0	0	2	0	1	0	1	0	X	4
Newfoundland and Labrador (Porter)	0	0	3	0	1	0	1	0	3	X	8

Draw 8

Sheet A	1	2	3	4	5	6	7	8	9	10	Final
Quebec (Routledge)	0	2	1	0	0	0	1	0	2	0	6
Northern Ontario (Lilly)	1	0	0	0	1	2	0	1	0	2	7

Sheet C	1	2	3	4	5	6	7	8	9	10	Final
Yukon (Koltun)	0	0	0	2	0	2	0	0	1	X	5
Prince Edward Island (Fullerton)	0	0	3	0	4	0	1	2	0	X	10

Sheet E	1	2	3	4	5	6	7	8	9	10	Final
Northwest Territories (Williams)	0	0	1	0	1	0	1	0	1	X	4
Alberta (Chyz)	1	1	0	2	0	1	0	1	0	X	6

Sheet H	1	2	3	4	5	6	7	8	9	10	Final
Newfoundland and Labrador (Porter)	0	0	0	2	0	1	0	0	X	X	3
Ontario (Grandy)	1	1	3	0	1	0	1	2	X	X	9

Sheet J	1	2	3	4	5	6	7	8	9	10	Final
Nova Scotia (Doucet)	1	0	0	0	4	0	0	2	0	1	8
New Brunswick (Armstrong)	0	1	2	1	0	2	2	0	2	0	10

Sheet L	1	2	3	4	5	6	7	8	9	10	Final
British Columbia (Sivertson)	0	0	0	1	0	1	0	0	1	1	4
Saskatchewan (Paulsen)	0	0	1	0	1	0	0	1	0	0	3

Draw 9

Sheet B	1	2	3	4	5	6	7	8	9	10	Final
Prince Edward Island (Fullerton)	1	0	5	0	1	2	3	X	X	X	12
Northwest Territories (Williams)	0	1	0	1	0	0	0	X	X	X	2

Sheet C	1	2	3	4	5	6	7	8	9	10	Final
Manitoba (Meakin)	2	0	2	0	1	0	3	0	3	X	11
Quebec (Routledge)	0	1	0	2	0	1	0	2	0	X	6

Sheet E	1	2	3	4	5	6	7	8	9	10	Final
Northern Ontario (Lilly)	0	2	0	0	1	1	0	0	0	3	7
Yukon (Koltun)	1	0	2	0	0	0	1	1	1	0	6

Sheet H	1	2	3	4	5	6	7	8	9	10	Final
Saskatchewan (Paulsen)	0	0	1	0	3	0	2	0	3	X	9
New Brunswick (Armstrong)	0	0	0	1	0	1	0	1	0	X	3

Sheet I	1	2	3	4	5	6	7	8	9	10	Final
British Columbia (Sivertson)	1	1	0	0	1	0	3	0	1	0	7
Newfoundland and Labrador (Porter)	0	0	1	3	0	1	0	2	0	1	8

Sheet L	1	2	3	4	5	6	7	8	9	10	Final
Ontario (Grandy)	0	0	2	3	2	0	0	1	0	0	8
Nova Scotia (Doucet)	1	0	0	0	0	2	1	0	1	2	7

Draw 10

Sheet B	1	2	3	4	5	6	7	8	9	10	11	Final
Northern Ontario (Lilly)	2	0	1	0	2	2	0	1	0	0	1	9
Ontario (Grandy)	0	1	0	1	0	0	2	0	2	2	0	8

Sheet D	1	2	3	4	5	6	7	8	9	10	11	Final
Nova Scotia (Doucet)	2	0	4	0	1	0	0	0	1	0	1	9
British Columbia (Sivertson)	0	2	0	2	0	2	0	1	0	1	0	8

Sheet F	1	2	3	4	5	6	7	8	9	10	Final
Newfoundland and Labrador (Porter)	0	0	1	0	0	1	0	0	X	X	2
Saskatchewan (Paulsen)	0	1	0	2	2	0	2	2	X	X	9

Sheet H	1	2	3	4	5	6	7	8	9	10	Final
Alberta (Chyz)	0	0	1	1	0	1	0	1	0	1	5
Prince Edward Island (Fullerton)	0	0	0	0	1	0	2	0	1	0	4

Sheet J	1	2	3	4	5	6	7	8	9	10	Final
Yukon (Koltun)	0	2	0	3	2	1	4	X	X	X	12
Quebec (Routledge)	0	0	2	0	0	0	0	X	X	X	2

Sheet L	1	2	3	4	5	6	7	8	9	10	Final
Manitoba (Meakin)	0	2	1	0	0	1	0	1	0	1	6
Northwest Territories (Williams)	1	0	0	0	0	0	1	0	2	0	4

Draw 11

Sheet B	1	2	3	4	5	6	7	8	9	10	Final
Saskatchewan (Paulsen)	0	3	0	1	5	0	1	X	X	X	10
Nova Scotia (Doucet)	0	0	1	0	0	1	0	X	X	X	2

Sheet D	1	2	3	4	5	6	7	8	9	10	Final
New Brunswick (Armstrong)	4	2	0	2	2	0	1	X	X	X	11
Northern Ontario (Lilly)	0	0	1	0	0	2	0	X	X	X	3

Sheet F	1	2	3	4	5	6	7	8	9	10	Final
British Columbia (Sivertson)	4	0	3	2	0	0	1	0	2	X	12
Ontario (Grandy)	0	1	0	0	2	2	0	2	0	X	7

Sheet H	1	2	3	4	5	6	7	8	9	10	Final
Northwest Territories (Williams)	0	0	1	0	0	0	0	0	X	X	1
Yukon (Koltun)	2	1	0	1	3	1	2	1	X	X	11

Sheet I	1	2	3	4	5	6	7	8	9	10	11	Final
Prince Edward Island (Fullerton)	1	0	2	0	1	0	0	2	0	1	1	8
Manitoba (Meakin)	0	0	0	3	0	2	1	0	1	0	0	7

Sheet K	1	2	3	4	5	6	7	8	9	10	Final
Quebec (Routledge)	0	0	2	0	1	2	0	1	0	0	6
Alberta (Chyz)	0	1	0	3	0	0	2	0	0	1	7

Draw 12

Sheet B	1	2	3	4	5	6	7	8	9	10	Final
Alberta (Chyz)	0	1	0	2	0	1	0	3	0	0	7
British Columbia (Sivertson)	1	0	3	0	1	0	2	0	1	1	9

Sheet D	1	2	3	4	5	6	7	8	9	10	Final
Ontario (Grandy)	1	0	1	0	2	0	0	0	1	X	5
Saskatchewan (Paulsen)	0	1	0	1	0	2	2	2	0	X	8

Sheet F	1	2	3	4	5	6	7	8	9	10	Final
Manitoba (Meakin)	2	1	1	1	0	2	0	1	1	X	9
Yukon (Koltun)	0	0	0	0	1	0	3	0	0	X	4

Sheet H	1	2	3	4	5	6	7	8	9	10	11	Final
Northern Ontario (Lilly)	0	0	1	2	0	0	0	1	1	0	1	6
Nova Scotia (Doucet)	2	0	0	0	2	0	0	0	0	1	0	5

Sheet J	1	2	3	4	5	6	7	8	9	10	Final
Northwest Territories (Williams)	0	0	0	1	0	0	0	X	X	X	1
Newfoundland and Labrador (Porter)	4	3	5	0	1	1	1	X	X	X	15

Sheet L	1	2	3	4	5	6	7	8	9	10	Final
Quebec (Routledge)	0	1	1	0	2	0	0	3	0	0	7
New Brunswick (Armstrong)	0	0	0	1	0	2	1	0	1	1	6

Draw 13

Sheet A	1	2	3	4	5	6	7	8	9	10	Final
Yukon (Koltun)	0	0	0	2	0	1	2	0	2	X	7
Ontario (Grandy)	1	0	0	0	1	0	0	3	0	X	5

Sheet C	1	2	3	4	5	6	7	8	9	10	Final
Saskatchewan (Paulsen)	0	0	2	0	1	0	0	0	0	X	3
Alberta (Chyz)	1	0	0	1	0	2	2	1	2	X	9

Sheet E	1	2	3	4	5	6	7	8	9	10	Final
British Columbia (Sivertson)	0	1	0	0	0	1	0	0	1	X	3
Manitoba (Meakin)	3	0	1	0	0	0	1	2	0	X	7

Team	1	2	3	4	5	6	7	8	9	10	Final
Nova Scotia (Doucet)	0	2	0	1	0	2	0	1	0	X	6
Prince Edward Island (Fullerton)	1	0	3	0	1	0	2	0	3	X	10

Team	1	2	3	4	5	6	7	8	9	10	Final
Newfoundland and Labrador (Porter)	1	0	0	2	0	0	1	1	3	X	8
Northern Ontario (Lilly)	0	0	1	0	2	1	0	0	0	X	4

Team	1	2	3	4	5	6	7	8	9	10	Final
New Brunswick (Armstrong)	3	0	0	5	3	4	0	1	X	X	16
Northwest Territories (Williams)	0	2	0	0	0	0	1	0	X	X	3

=== Playoffs ===
Semifinal		Final
Saskatchewan	7
Manitoba	6	Alberta	4
		Saskatchewan	6

==== Semifinal ====
Sheet D	1	2	3	4	5	6	7	8	9	10	Final
Manitoba (Meakin)	0	3	0	1	0	1	0	1	0	0	6
Saskatchewan (Paulsen)	1	0	2	0	0	0	2	0	1	1	7

Player percentages
Manitoba		Saskatchewan	
Krysten Karwacki	90%	Natalie Yanko	81%
Erika Sigurdson	75%	Kari Paulsen	73%
Briane Meilleur	70%	Kari Kennedy	71%
Breanne Meakin	75%	Trish Paulsen	83%
Total	78%	Total	77%

==== Final ====
Sheet D	1	2	3	4	5	6	7	8	9	10	Final
Alberta (Chyz)	0	0	1	0	0	1	0	2	0	0	4
Saskatchewan (Paulsen)	0	0	0	1	1	0	1	0	1	3	7

Player percentages
Alberta		Saskatchewan	
Kimberly Anderson	80%	Natalie Yanko	83%
Jessie Scheidegger	88%	Kari Paulsen	84%
Rebecca Pattison	76%	Kari Kennedy	79%
Nadine Chyz	80%	Trish Paulsen	81%
Total	81%	Total	82%

== Qualification ==
=== Ontario ===
The Pepsi Ontario Junior Curling Championships were held January 5–9 at the Sarnia Golf & Curling Club in Point Edward.

Results:

Men's	W	L
Mathew Camm (Ottawa)	7	0
Richard Krell (St. Thomas)	5	2
Michael Bryson (Annandale)	5	2
Robert Collins (Coldwater)	3	4
Jack Lindsay (St. George's)	3	4
Derreck Veitch (Stroud)	2	5
Kurtis Byrd (Rideau)	2	5
Matt Dickson (Palmerston)	1	6

Women's	W	L
Clancy Grandy (KW Granite)	6	1
Jasmin Thurston (KW Granite)	5	2
Stephanie Van Huyse (Oakville)	4	3
Shannon Harrington (Ottawa)	4	3
Ginger Coyle (Highland)	3	4
Stacey Hogan (Tam Heather)	2	5
Nicol McNiven (Carleton Heights)	2	5
Jamie Sinclair (St. Thomas)	2	5

Playoffs

- Men's semi final: Bryson 8-7 Krell
- Men's final: Camm 7-5 Bryson
- Women's tiebreaker: Van Huyse 6-4 Harrington
- Women's semi final: Thurston 10-9 Van Huyse
- Women's final: Grandy 6-5 Thurston
