= 2017 Battlefords—Lloydminster federal by-election =

- December 11, 2017

Seat of Battlefords—Lloydminster
- Turnout: 27.05% (▼39.46pp)
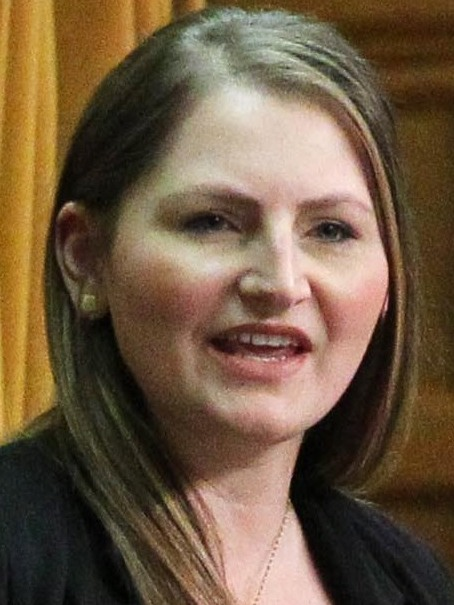
	First party	Second party
		NDP
Candidate	Rosemarie Falk	Matt Fedler
Party	Conservative	New Democratic
Popular vote	8,965	1,698
Percentage	69.56%	13.17%
Swing	▲8.55pp	▼4.44pp
	Third party	Fourth party
	LPC	Ind.
Candidate	Larry Ingram	Ken Finlayson
Party	Liberal	Independent
Popular vote	1,345	681
Percentage	10.44%	5.28%
Swing	▼6.04pp	N/A
MP before election
Gerry Ritz
Conservative
Elected MP
Rosemarie Falk
Conservative

A by-election was held in the federal riding of Battlefords—Lloydminster in Saskatchewan on December 11, 2017, following the resignation of Conservative MP Gerry Ritz

The seat was held for the Conservatives, with Rosemarie Falk winning the seat on an increased majority.

The by election was held on the same day as three others across Canada; Bonavista—Burin—Trinity in Newfoundland and Labrador, Scarborough—Agincourt in Ontario and South Surrey—White Rock in British Columbia.

== Background ==
=== Constituency ===
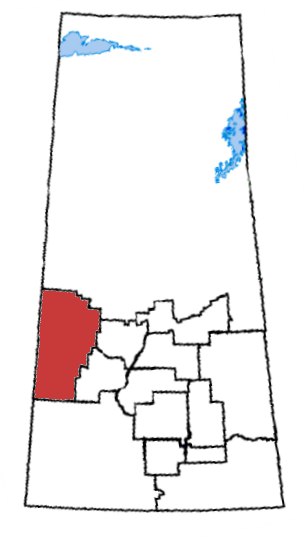
Battlefords—Lloydminster in Saskatchewan.

Battlefords—Lloydminster is a large rural constituency in Central-Western Saskatchewan. It includes the communities of North Battleford, Battleford and Unity; as well as the Saskatchewan portion of Lloydminster.

=== Representation ===
Battlefords—Lloydminster is considered a safe seat for the Tories. Ritz had been Battlefords—Lloydminster's only Member of Parliament, holding the riding since its creation for the 1997 election, first as a Reform Party of Canada MP, then on behalf of the Canadian Alliance and since 2003 as a Conservative. He served as Agriculture Minister in Stephen Harper's cabinet from 2007 to 2015.

== Campaign ==
On August 30, 2017, it was reported that Battlefords—Lloydminster MP Gerry Ritz had asked not to be included in the reshuffled Conservative shadow cabinet. Ritz confirmed the next day that he would resign from parliament. The seat was vacated on October 2, 2017.

5 candidates won the election.

Former parliamentary staffer Rosemarie Falk defeated Langham Mayor John Hildebrand, small business owner Aron Klassen, Kindersley CAO Bernie Morton, and farmer Richard Nelson to win the Conservative nomination. Meadow Lake MLA and former Desnethé—Missinippi—Churchill River MP Jeremy Harrison was rumoured to be a candidate for the Conservative nomination, but did not make his intentions known before the cut-off date to join the race.

Rodeo cowboy and rancher Ken Finlayson's bid for the Conservative nomination was rejected by the party over concern that he was not a "team player". Finlayson ran as an independent.

Professional MMA fighter and athlete Matt Fedler was named the NDP candidate.

Contractor and former RM of Mervin councillor Larry Ingram was acclaimed as the Liberal Party candidate. Ingram previously ran for the party in Battlefords—Lloydminster in 2015.

The Speaker's warrant regarding the vacancy was received on October 3, 2017; under the Parliament of Canada Act the writ for a by-election had to be dropped no later than April 1, 2018, 180 days after the Chief Electoral Officer was officially notified of the vacancy via a warrant issued by the Speaker.

== Results ==
Canadian federal by-election, 11 December 2017 Resignation of Gerry Ritz
Party	Candidate	Votes	%	±%
Conservative	Rosemarie Falk	8,965	69.56	+8.55
New Democratic	Matt Fedler	1,698	13.17	-4.44
Liberal	Larry Ingram	1,345	10.44	-6.04
Independent	Ken Finlayson	681	5.28	–
Green	Yvonne Potter-Pihach	200	1.55	-0.16
Total valid votes/Expense limit		12,889	100.00	
Total rejected ballots				
Turnout		12,889	27.05	-39.46
Eligible voters		47,651		
Conservative hold		Swing		+6.49

== 2015 result ==
2015 Canadian federal election
Party	Candidate	Votes	%	±%	Expenditures
Conservative	Gerry Ritz	20,547	61.01	-4.94	$70,973.30
New Democratic	Glenn Tait	5,930	17.61	-10.45	$6,284.73
Liberal	Larry Ingram	5,550	16.48	+13.10	$17,912.01
Independent	Doug Anguish	1,076	3.19	n/a	–
Green	Mikaela Tenkink	575	1.71	-0.90	$56.97
Total valid votes/Expense limit		33,678	99.45		$214,778.83
Total rejected ballots		186	0.55	–	
Turnout		33,864	66.51	–	
Eligible voters		50,917			
Conservative hold		Swing		+2.76	
Source: Elections Canada
