= 2008–2009 Chile listeriosis outbreak =

Outbreak of Listeria monocytogenes food poisoning in Chile

The 2008–2009 Chile listeriosis outbreak was an epidemic outbreak of listeriosis in that country, caused by the species Listeria monocytogenes, which spread mainly through foods of animal origin, such as cecina, sausages, cheese and other dairy products. As of August 2009, 164 cases had been recorded, with a total of 16 deaths, among whom different strains of the bacterium were detected.

While in 2008 the outbreak was restricted to the Santiago Metropolitan Region, where the strain called "clone 009" predominated, in 2009 it spread to the regions of Valparaíso, O'Higgins, Maule, Biobío and Araucanía, through a different strain, called "clone 001".

== Background ==
The study of listeriosis in the world is recent, since the first analyses of the bacterium Listeria monocytogenes date back to the early 1980s in the United States. Its mortality rate is around 25% of cases in healthy adults, a figure that may be higher in at-risk groups. Listeriosis has mainly affected countries in the Northern Hemisphere, both in North America (Canada and the United States) and in Europe (France and Switzerland).

This disease has been studied in Chile since 1990 and the presence of the bacterium has been observed in ice cream (3.5%), soft cheeses (0.8%), cecina (3.6%) and frozen shellfish (11.6%). However, health regulations do not include this bacterium within the parameters of food surveillance, which is carried out in the United States and European Union countries.

Listeriosis cases
Year	Santiago(Source: Minsal)	National total(Source: ISP)
2006	26	50
2007	20	44

Until 2007, reported cases in Chile remained stable. The Public Health Institute (Instituto de Salud Pública, ISP) received less than fifty samples annually, while the Santiago Metropolitan Region averaged twenty-three cases between 2006 and 2007. The Clínica Alemana de Santiago received between one and two cases per year, with newborn patients being frequent.

== Development ==
=== Contamination by soft cheeses in Santiago (2008) ===
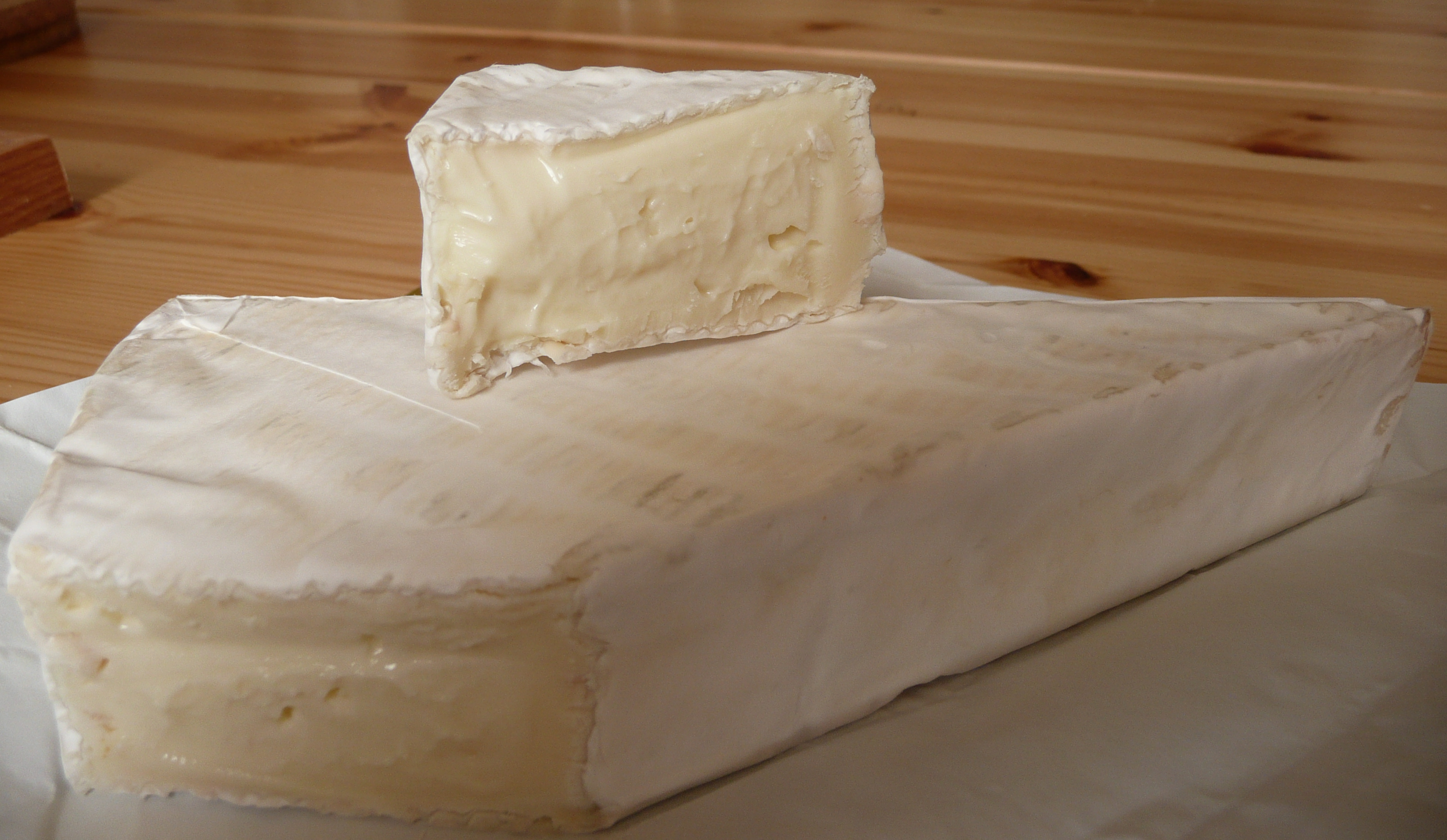
Brie, a type of soft cheese in which Listeria was found in late 2008.

During the first half of 2008, the number of cases studied by health centers and medical institutions in the Santiago Metropolitan Region quadrupled compared to previous years, with a particular increase in the disease in pregnant patients.

In September 2008, the SEREMI Metropolitana de Salud took several samples of suspect foods and identified the "strain 009" in a variety of Brie cheese. As a result, the Public Health Institute (ISP) identified the strains in soft cheeses of the Chevrita brand and on November 25 the SEREMI issued the recall of all brie and camembert cheeses of that company, as well as products of the brands Las Pircas and Lescure.

Finally, up to the end of 2008, 119 cases were registered in the Metropolitan Region (there is no data for the rest of Chile), 77% of which belonged to the northeastern sector of the capital, with the largest number concentrated in districts characterized by a high socioeconomic level, such as Las Condes (sixteen cases), Vitacura (twelve cases), Lo Barnechea (four cases), Ñuñoa (three cases), Providencia (three cases), La Reina (two cases) and Peñalolén (one case).

Listeriosis cases in Greater Santiago during 2008. Cases of "strain 009". Cases of other strains

=== National outbreak due to cecinas (2009) ===
Confirmed cases of listeriosis 2009
Dates	Cases	Deaths
April 23	18	3
May 14	27	7
August 25	45	9

Following the identification of the origin of "clone 009" and the subsequent recall of contaminated products, there was a drop in listeriosis cases during the summer of 2009. However, in March the disease reemerged, this time due to a different strain than the one in the Chevrita cheeses, called "clone 001". Following an investigation of several companies, on April 13 the ISP identified Doñihue Limitada, a company that supplied laminated jerky to Agrosuper, as the source of the new outbreak of listeriosis, due to contamination of the food conveyor bar. In mid-April, the Servicio Agrícola y Ganadero (SAG) detected the presence of Listeria in products from a dairy company in Frutillar, Los Lagos Region; however, no cases had been reported in that area until that date.

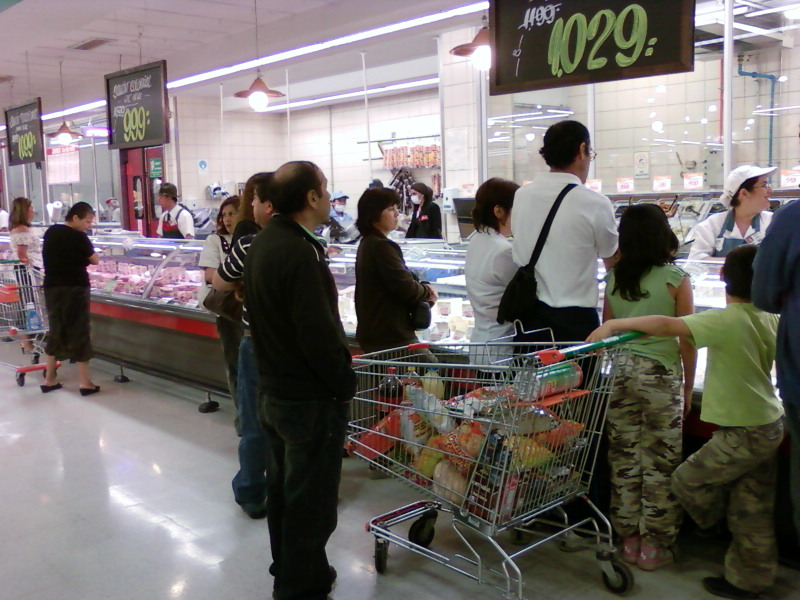
In 2009, the cecina trade suffered a drop in sales, which even affected companies without a listeria outbreak.

We are facing a situation of a type of germ that is possible to control with the measures we are applying and, in this sense, we will continue to insist on prevention, education and, fundamentally, control actions.

— Michelle Bachelet, April 21 2009.

On April 23, the Ministry of Health issued a report on the status of the outbreak, identifying eighteen cases and three deaths, two in the Metropolitan Region, and one in Rancagua, O'Higgins Region, the first listeriosis fatality reported outside Santiago. Two days later, the Jumbo supermarket chain detected that several of its own products, including longanizas, chorizos, meats and sausages, had the bacterium, and they were immediately withdrawn from sale to the public.

Between May 14 and 15, four new victims of the disease were added, two from the Metropolitan Region and two from the Valparaíso Region. However, the Minister of Health Alvaro Erazo stated that this was not a resurgence of the bacterium, since "there is no history that could be repeated or a type of consumption that points to any particular company and to any focus of contagion". On May 19, a new case of listeriosis in Temuco came to public light, in which a pregnant mother, who did not present symptoms, passed the disease to her child before delivery.

=== Decline ===
The spread of influenza A (H1N1) in the country, which began in mid-May 2009, surpassed the listeriosis health emergency. However, specialists recommended at the time to continue with food precautions regarding dairy products and beef jerky, since epidemic control was essential to keep the disease stable and avoid a resurgence. In August 2009, a 24-year-old woman died of listeriosis in the Maule Region, although the authorities said it was an isolated case and had no connection with the outbreak in the first half of that year.

To speak of a resurgence, we must have several cases associated with the same type of listeria. Listeria have genetic differentiation [...], however, we do not have cases in the same area or surrounding areas in which we can say that they correspond to a new outbreak, it does not seem to us, but of course we are expectant and vigilant.

— Lorena Rodríguez, head of the Food and Nutrition Department of the Ministry of Health.

== Effects ==
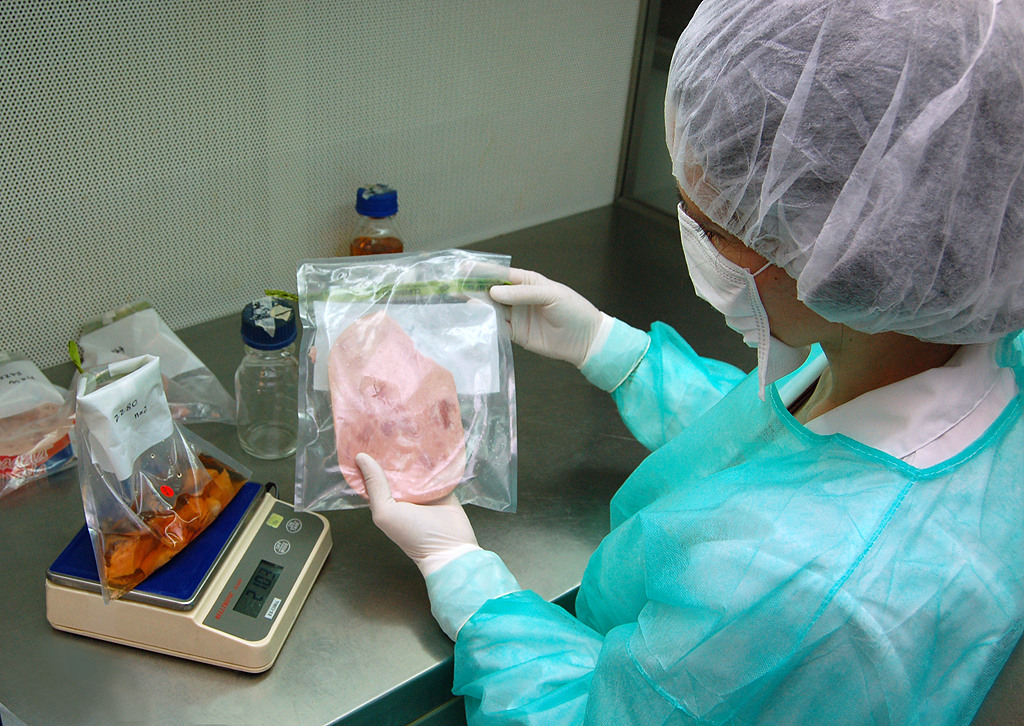
Listeria detection at the Pontificial Catholic University of Chile.

The outbreak of listeriosis revealed the need to implement an official microbiological criterion for the surveillance of this bacterium in Chile. The Ministry of Health presented a document with its proposal, prepared by its Food and Nutrition Department, to the Codex Alimentarius subcommittee on food hygiene, which it submitted for public consultation on its website. This document would be the basis for a decree establishing "zero tolerance" for the disease in three types of products; ready-to-eat foods (cecinas, cheeses), baby food (milk) and food for medical use.

Also, since 2008, the local scientific literature on the disease has increased significantly in response to the surprising growth of listeriosis cases in private and public health centers. Taking advantage of the situation, scientists from the Institute of Food Science and Technology (Instituto de Ciencia y Tecnología de los Alimentos, Icytal), which belongs to the Faculty of Agricultural Sciences of the Austral University in Valdivia, developed a spray that inhibits the bacterium, which they later presented at the World Best Technologies 2009 Fair in the United States.

Another collateral effect of the outbreak was the decrease in cheese sales, which was called by the press the "Chevrita effect", in reference to the company where the "strain 009" outbreak was identified, and in cecinas, following the outbreak of "strain 001" in the Doñihue company during 2009.

== Preventive measures ==
The Chilean Government prepared a series of recommendations and prevention measures to prevent the country's inhabitants from contracting the disease, highlighting special measures for at-risk groups such as pregnant women, children, immunosuppressants, the elderly and patients with chronic diseases. These measures were not to consume:

- Raw or partially cooked fish and meat.
- Dairy products from unauthorized companies.
- Soft cheeses (brie, camembert and blue cheeses).
- Unboiled sausages.
- Cecina spreads (pâté or meat or ham spreads).
- Unwashed vegetables, even if packaged.
- Ready-to-serve foods.
- Ham and sliced cheese.

Basic hygiene measures were also established for the general population:

- Wash hands before and after handling food.
- Wash kitchen surfaces and utensils that have been in contact with food at risk.
- Avoid cross-contamination, that is, separate raw food from cooked food.
- Consume pasteurized dairy products and derivatives.
- Wash vegetables and fruits without exception.
- Consume well-cooked meat and fish.
- Heating food in the microwave oven does not eliminate bacteria.
- Clean the refrigerator constantly.
- Purchase products in authorized places.

== Statistics ==
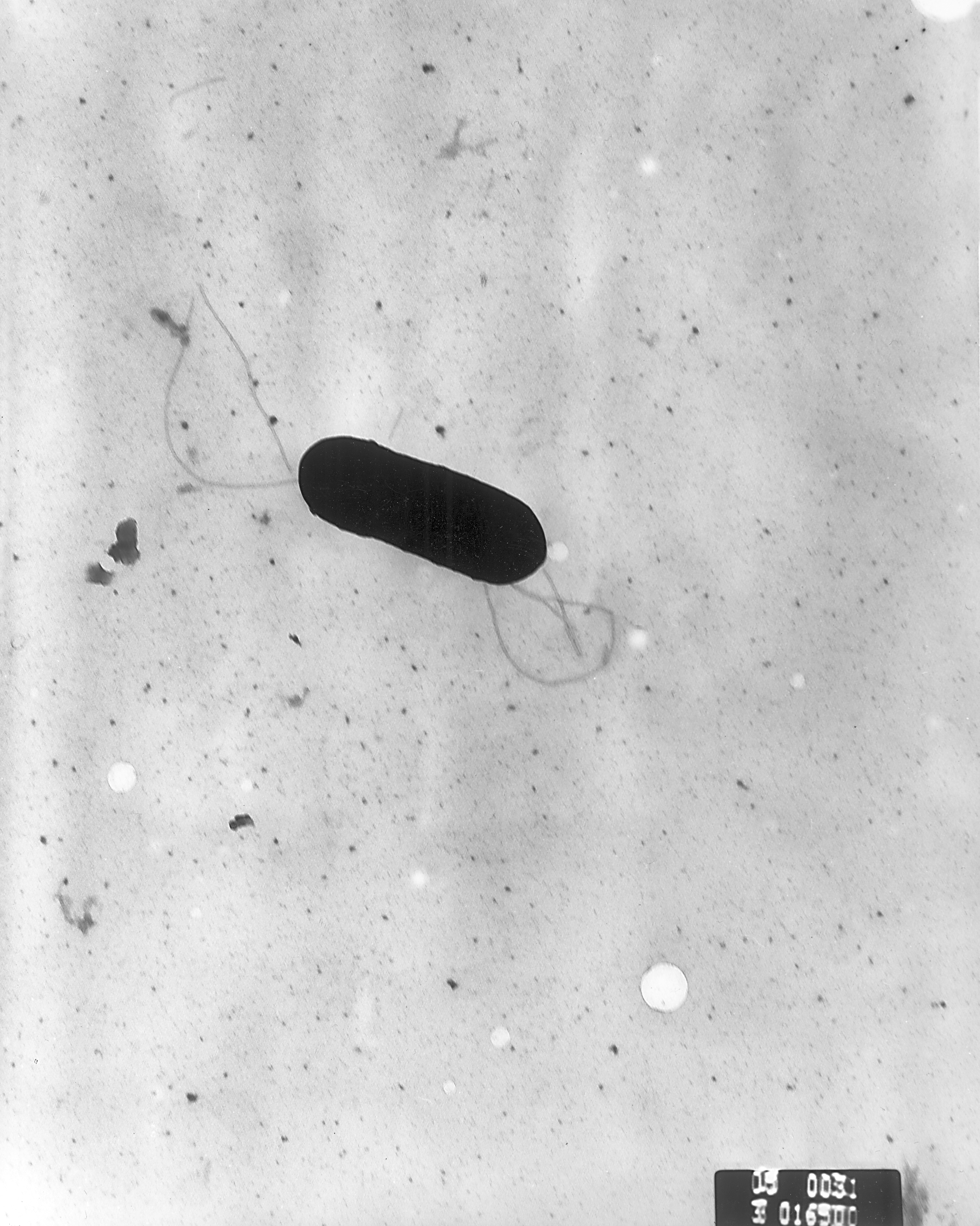
Image of Listeria monocytogenes.

Breakdown of cases of listeriosis reported by the Chilean Ministry of Health in each region of the country. Data for 2009 include all known cases up to August 25.

Region	Cases			Deaths		
Region	2008	2009	Total	2008	2009	Total
Arica y Parinacota	–	0	0	–	0	0
Tarapacá	–	0	0	–	0	0
Antofagasta	–	0	0	–	0	0
Atacama	–	0	0	–	0	0
Coquimbo	–	0	0	–	0	0
Valparaíso	–	7	7	–	2	2
Metropolitan	119	28	147	7	5	12
O'Higgins	–	3	3	–	1	1
Maule	–	2	2	–	1	1
Biobío	–	1	1	–	0	0
La Araucanía	–	2	2	–	0	0
Los Ríos	–	0	0	–	0	0
Los Lagos	–	2	2	–	0	0
Aysén	–	0	0	–	0	0
Magallanes	–	0	0	–	0	0
National total	119	45	164	7	9	16

== See also ==
- Health crisis
- Listeriosis
- Listeria monocytogenes
- 2008 Canada listeriosis outbreak
- COVID-19 pandemic in Chile

== Bibliography ==
- Cordano, Ana María; Rocourt, Joselyne (2001). "Occurrence of Listeria monocytogenes in food in Chile". International Journal of Food Microbiology. 70 (1–2): 175–178. doi:10.1016/S0168-1605(01)00533-5. ISSN 0168-1605. PMID 11759755.
