= 2025 Canadian federal election in Newfoundland and Labrador =

- April 28, 2025

All 7 Newfoundland and Labrador seats in the House of Commons
- Registered: 422,202
- Turnout: 277,579 (65.75%)
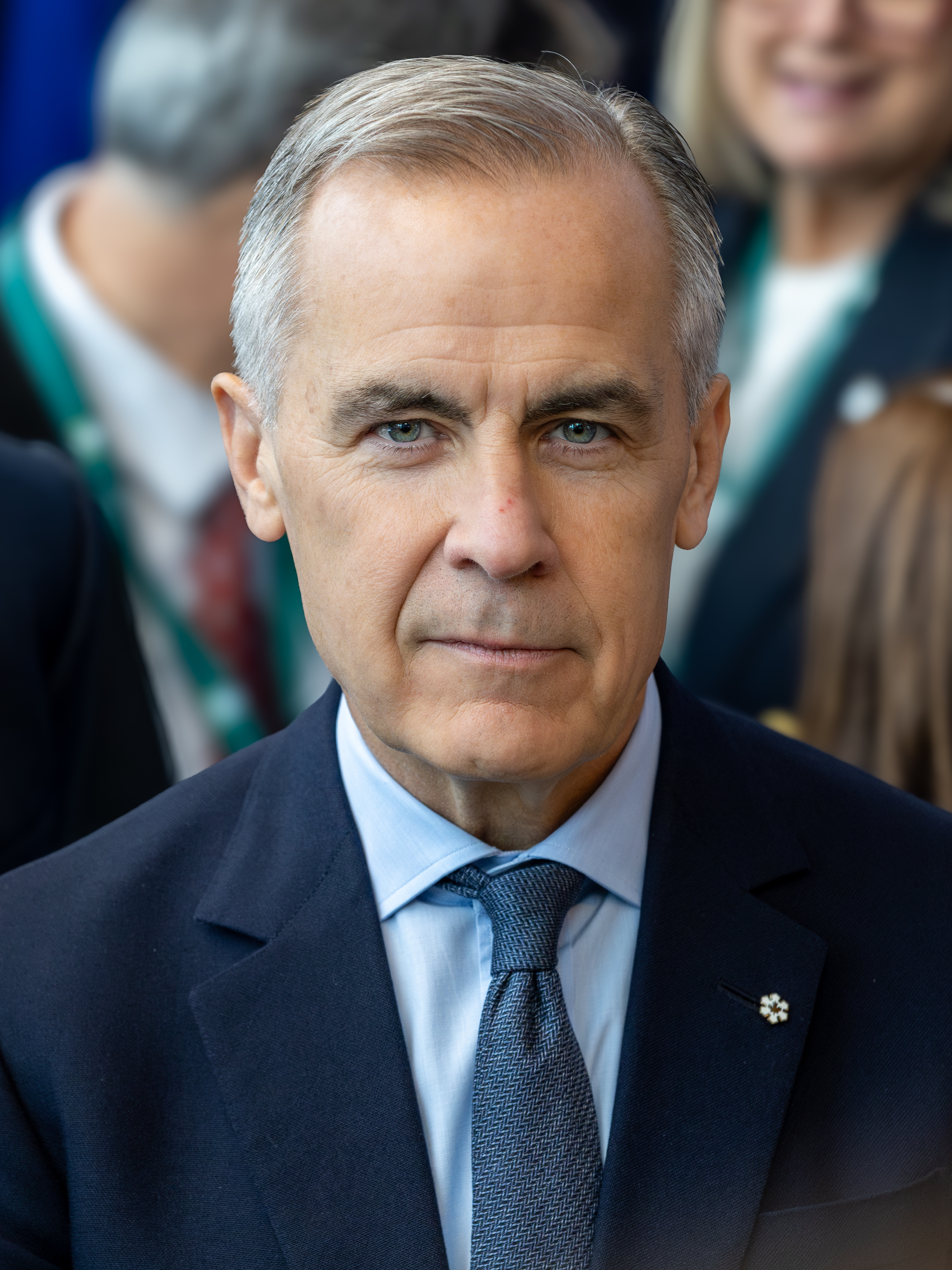

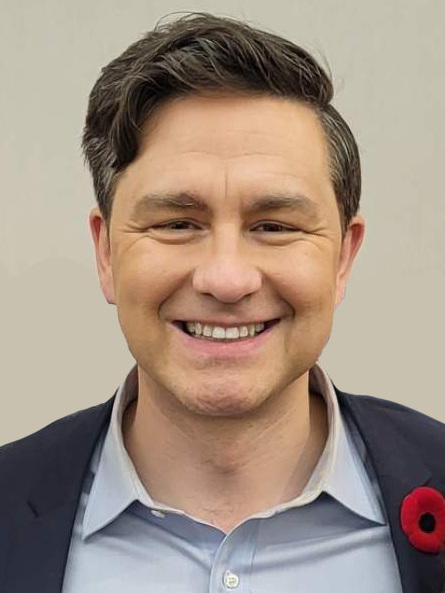

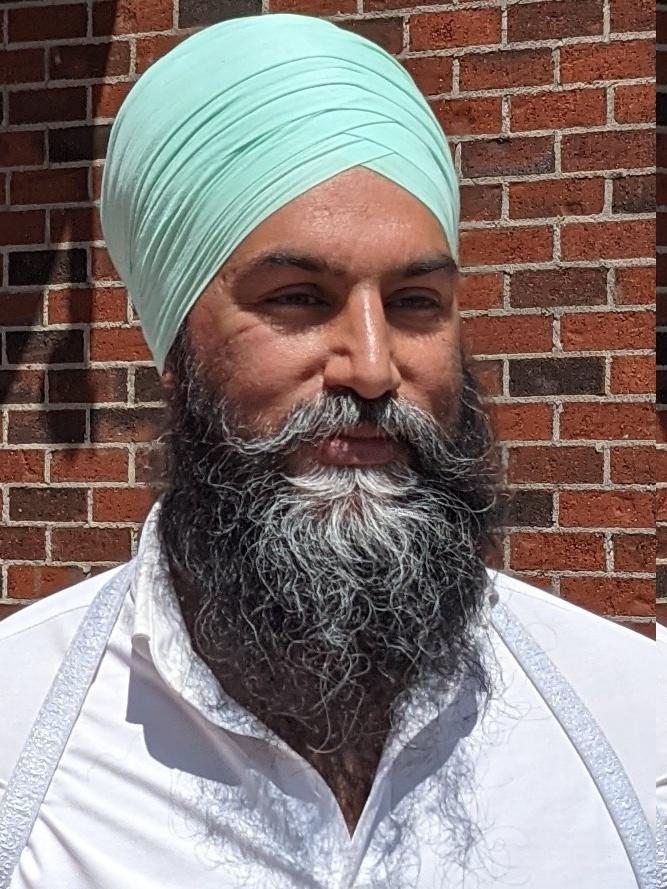
	First party	Second party	Third party
Leader	Mark Carney	Pierre Poilievre	Jagmeet Singh
Party	Liberal	Conservative	New Democratic
Leader since	March 9, 2025	September 10, 2022	October 1, 2017
Last election	6 seats, 47.7%	1 seat, 32.5%	0 seats, 17.4%
Seats before	6	1	0
Seats won	4	3	0
Seat change	▼2	▲2	0
Popular vote	150,011	110,321	15,282
Percentage	54.0%	39.7%	5.5%
Swing	▲6.3%	▲7.2%	▼11.9%

Liberal
30–35%
35–40%
40–45%
45–50%
50–55%
55–60%
60–65%
65–70%
>70%
Conservative
30–35%
35–40%
40–45%
45–50%
50–55%
55–60%
60–65%
65–70%
>70%
New Democratic
30–35%
35–40%
40–45%
45–50%
50–55%
55–60%
60–65%
65–70%
>70%
Prime Minister before election
Mark Carney
Liberal
Prime Minister after election
Mark Carney
Liberal

In the 2025 Canadian federal election, 7 members of Parliament were elected to the House of Commons from the province of Newfoundland and Labrador (2.0% of all members). The Liberals won 4 seats and the Conservatives won 3.

== 2022 electoral redistribution ==
The 2025 Canadian federal election was the first election to utilize the electoral districts established following the 2022 Canadian federal electoral redistribution. The House of Commons increased from 338 seats to 343 seats, although Newfoundland and Labrador did not gain or lose any of their 7 seats. Under this redistribution, the average population per constituency in Newfoundland and Labrador is 72,935 (according to the 2021 Canadian census), which is 34,913 fewer people per electoral district than the national average.

== Predictions ==
Polling firm	Last date of polling	Link	LPC	CPC	NDP	GPC	PPC	Others	Margin of error (Note: In cases when linked poll details distinguish between the margin of error associated with the total sample of respondents (including undecided and non-voters) and that of the subsample of decided/leaning voters, the former is included in the table. Also not included is the margin of error created by rounding to the nearest whole number or any margin of error from methodological sources. Most online polls (because of their opt-in method of recruiting panelists which results in a non-random sample) cannot have a margin of error. In such cases, shown is what the margin of error would be for a survey using a random probability-based sample of equivalent size.)	Sample size (Note: Refers to the total, "raw" sample size, including undecided and non-voters, and before demographic weighting is applied. Fractions in parentheses apply to rolling polls (see below) and indicate the proportion of the sample that is independent from the previous poll in the series.)	Polling method (Note: "Telephone" refers to traditional telephone polls conducted by live interviewers; "IVR" refers to automated Interactive Voice Response polls conducted by telephone; "online" refers to polls conducted exclusively over the internet; "telephone/online" refers to polls which combine results from both telephone and online surveys, or for which respondents are initially recruited by telephone and then asked to complete an online survey. "Rolling" polls contain overlapping data from one poll to the next.)	Lead
Narrative Research	August 18, 2024		32	45	19	3	0	0	± 2.6 pp	350	Telephone	13
Abacus Data	September 25, 2023		33	42	23	—N/a	1	1	± 4.5 pp	500	Online	9

=== Summary ===
Source	Ranking		
Source	Lib	Con	As of
338Canada	6	1	23 April 2025

== Summary of results ==
=== Summary ===
The Liberals won the most seats, receiving a plurality of votes in four ridings, a loss of two compared to 2021. They got 54% of the popular vote. The Conservatives got 39.7% of the vote and won three seats, gaining two. The NDP did not win any seats, but received 5.5% of the vote.

Party	Votes	Vote %	Vote +/-	Seats	Seat +/-
Liberal	150,011	54.0%	▲6.3pp	4 / 7 (57%)	▼2
Conservative	110,321	39.7%	▲7.2pp	3 / 7 (43%)	▲2
New Democratic	15,282	5.5%	▼11.9pp	0 / 7 (0%)	0
People's	535	0.2%	▼2.2pp	0 / 7 (0%)	0
Green	299	0.1%	▲0.1pp	0 / 7 (0%)	0
Independent	637	0.2%	▲0.2pp	0 / 7 (0%)	0
Other	494	0.2%	▲0.2pp	0 / 7 (0%)	0
Total	277,579	100%	–	7 / 7 (100%)	–

=== Comparison with national results ===
Results by party
Party	Popular vote %			Seats in caucus
Party	NL	Natl.	diff.	Seats in caucus
Liberal	54.0	43.7	+10.3	4 / 169 (2%)
Conservative	39.7	41.3	-1.6	3 / 144 (2%)
New Democratic	5.5	6.3	-0.8	0 / 7 (0%)
People's	0.2	0.7	-0.5	no caucus
Green	0.1	1.2	-1.1	0 / 1 (0%)
Total	–	–	–	7 / 343 (2%)

== Synopsis by riding ==
Results by riding in Newfoundland and Labrador - 2025 Canadian federal election
Riding	2021	Winning party					Turnout (Note: including spoilt ballots)	Votes (Note: minor political parties receiving less than 1% of the national popular vote are aggregated under "Other"; independent candidates are aggregated separately)							
Riding	2021	Party	Votes	Share	Margin #	Margin %	Turnout	Lib	Con	NDP	PPC	Green	Ind	Other	Total
Avalon	Lib														
Cape Spear	Lib														
Central Newfoundland	Con														
Labrador	Lib														
Long Range Mountains	Lib														
St. John's East	Lib														
Terra Nova—The Peninsulas	Lib														

== Student Vote results ==
Student votes are mock elections that run parallel to actual elections, in which students not of voting age participate. They are administered by Student Vote Canada. These are for educational purposes and do not count towards the results.

Summary of the 2025 Canadian Student Vote in Newfoundland and Labrador
Party	Leader	Seats			Popular vote		
Party	Leader	Elected	%	Δ	Votes	%	Δ (pp)
Liberal	Mark Carney	4	57.14	0	7,318	38.39	▲2.75
Conservative	Pierre Poilievre	3	42.86	▲2	7,911	41.50	▲16.26
New Democratic	Jagmeet Singh	0	0	▼2	2,354	12.35	▼18.42
Other		0	0	0	1,016	5.33	▼3.03
Green	Elizabeth May & Jonathan Pedneault	0	0	0	462	2.42	▲2.42
Total		7	100.00	0	19,061	100.00	–
Source: Student Vote Canada

== See also ==
- Canadian federal election results in Newfoundland and Labrador
