= 2021 Canadian federal election in Newfoundland and Labrador =

← 2019	September 20, 2021	2025 →

7 Newfoundland and Labrador seats in the House of Commons
- Turnout: 52.8% (▼6.0pp)
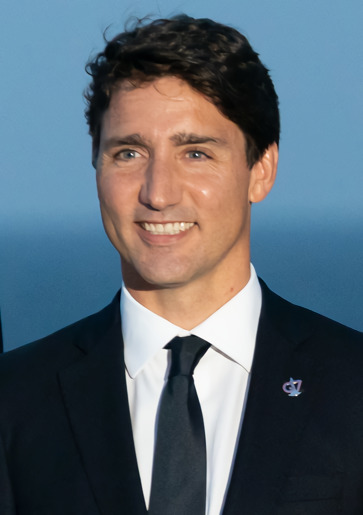

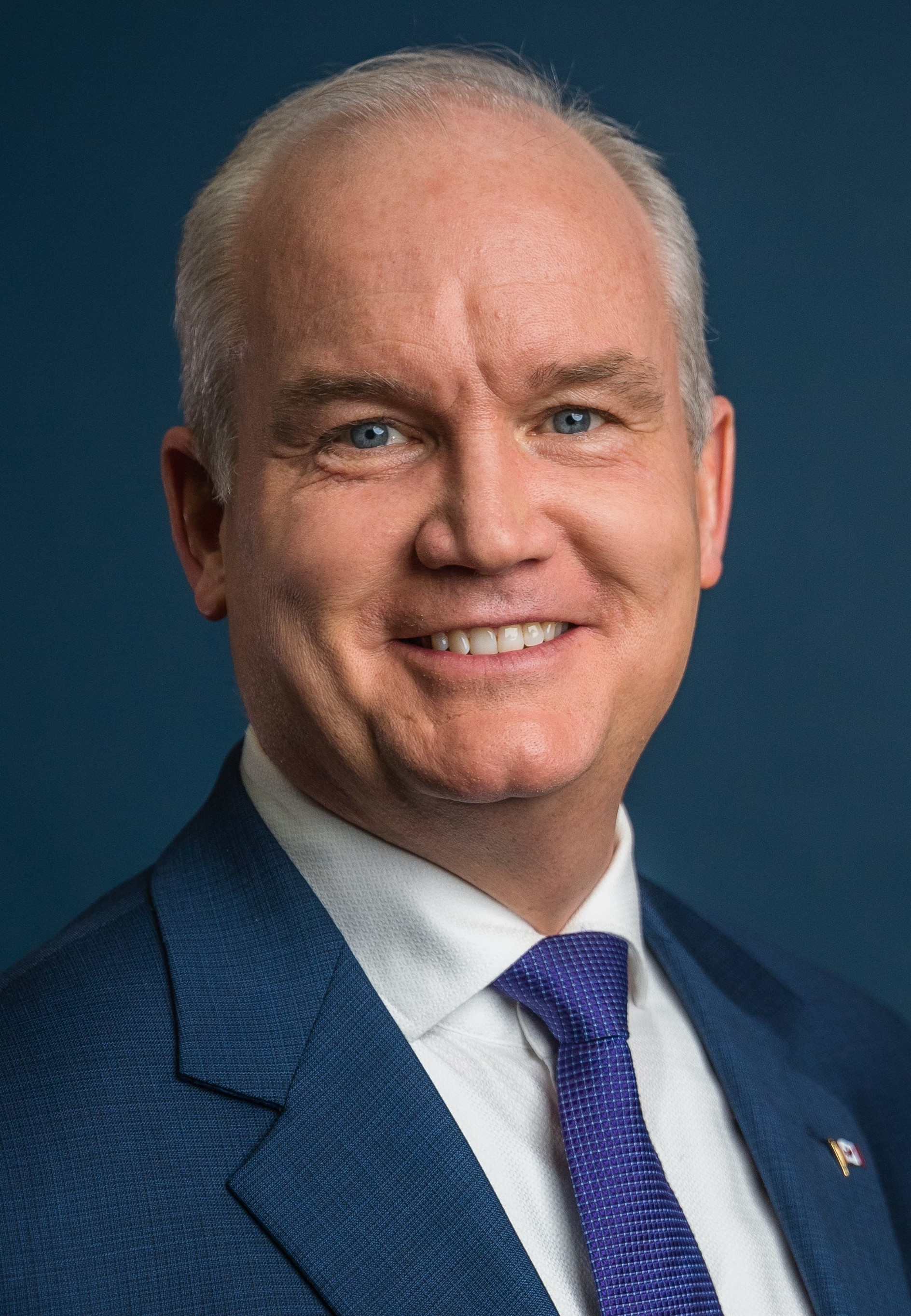

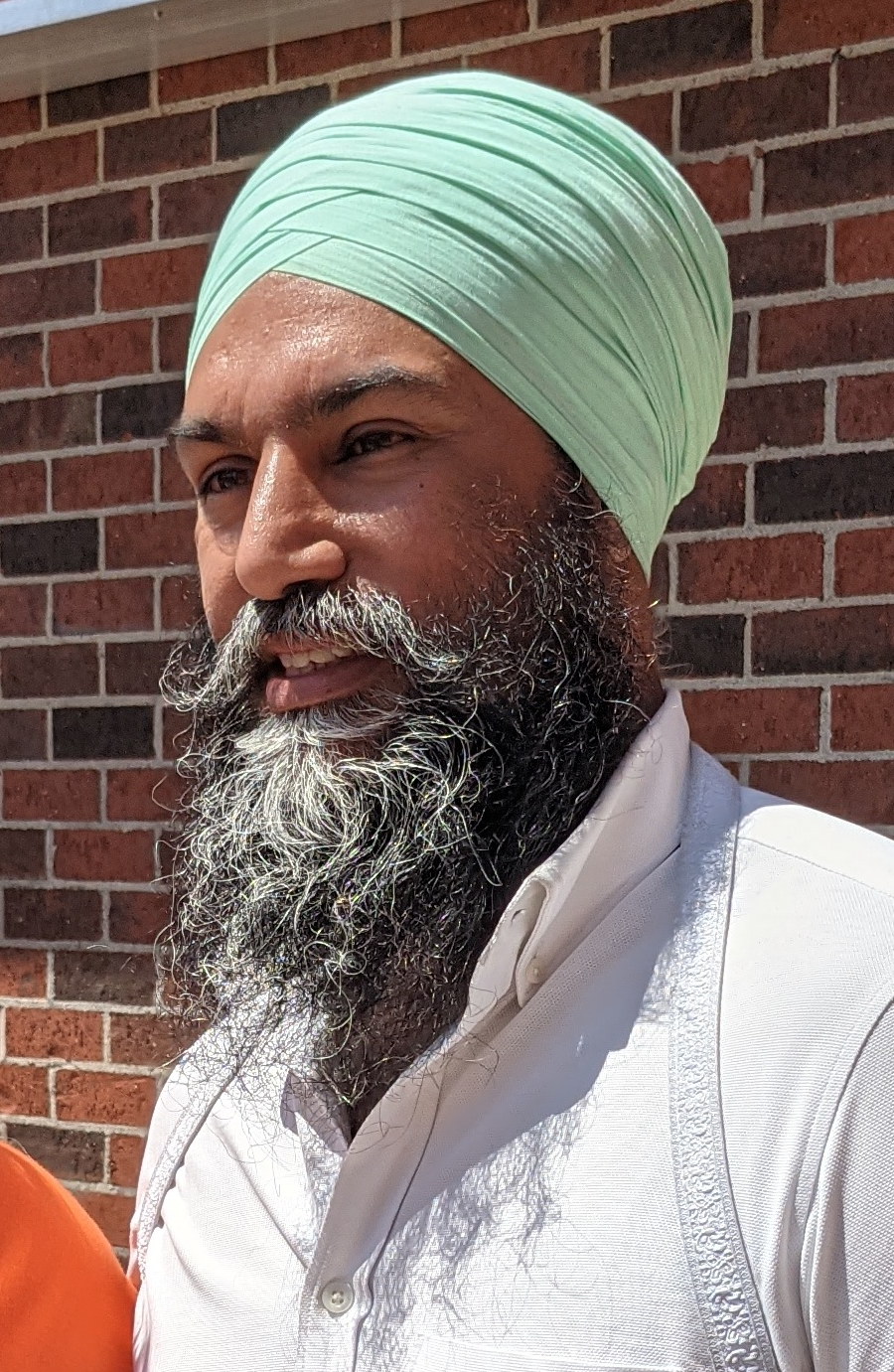
	First party	Second party	Third party
Leader	Justin Trudeau	Erin O'Toole	Jagmeet Singh
Party	Liberal	Conservative	New Democratic
Leader since	April 14, 2013	August 24, 2020	October 1, 2017
Last election	6 seats, 46.42%	0 seats, 25.44%	1 seat, 24.52%
Seats before	6	0	1
Seats won	6	1	0
Seat change	Steady	▲1	▼1
Popular vote	104,240	70,783	37,743
Percentage	47.83%	32.48%	17.32%
Swing	▲1.41pp	▲7.04 pp	▼7.20pp

The 2021 Canadian federal election in Newfoundland and Labrador was held on September 20, 2021 in the 7 electoral districts in the province of Newfoundland and Labrador.

The Liberal Party, led by Justin Trudeau, won 6 of the province's 7 seats, repeating their performance in the previous federal election. Though they gained a seat in St. John's East from the New Democrats, they lost a seat to the Conservative Party in Coast of Bays—Central—Notre Dame. This was the first election since 2011 where a Conservative candidate won a seat in Newfoundland and Labrador.

== Summary of results ==
Party	Votes	Vote %	Vote +/-	Seats	Seat +/-
Liberal	104,240	47.83%	▲1.41 pp	6 / 7 (86%)	Steady
Conservative	70,783	32.48%	▲7.04pp	1 / 7 (14%)	▲1
New Democratic	37,743	17.32%	▼7.20pp	0 / 7 (0%)	▼1
People's	5,150	2.36%	▲2.22pp	0 / 7 (0%)	Steady
Total	220,632 (Note: including spoilt ballots)	100%	–	7 / 7 (100%)	–

== Synopsis by riding ==
Results by riding in Newfoundland and Labrador - 2021 Canadian federal election
Riding	2019	Winning party					Turnout	Votes				
Riding	2019	Party	Votes	Share	Margin #	Margin %	Turnout	Lib	Con	NDP	PPC	Total
Avalon	Lib	Lib	18,608	50.10%	5,870	15.81%	52.77%	18,608	12,738	5,151	647	37,417
Bonavista—Burin—Trinity	Lib	Lib	13,972	46.59%	1,694	5.65%	51.12%	13,972	12,278	2,484	1,257	30,473
Coast of Bays—Central—Notre Dame	Lib	Con	14,927	46.89%	281	0.88%	51.12%	14,646	14,927	2,261	—	32,529
Labrador	Lib	Lib	4,119	42.67%	1,189	12.32%	48.16%	4,119	2,930	2,297	307	9,747
Long Range Mountains	Lib	Lib	16,178	44.39%	1,834	5.03%	52.57%	16,178	14,344	4,347	1,578	36,908
St. John's East	NDP	Lib	17,239	45.16%	4,149	10.87%	57.44%	17,239	7,119	13,090	723	38,467
St. John's South—Mount Pearl	Lib	Lib	19,478	56.17%	11,365	32.77%	52.63%	19,478	6,447	8,113	638	35,090

== See also ==
- Canadian federal election results in Newfoundland and Labrador
