= Jonathan Rowe (politician) =

Canadian politician (born 1998)

Jonathan Rowe MP

Member of Parliament for The Eastern Peninsulas (Terra Nova—The Peninsulas; 2025–2026)
- Incumbent
- Assumed office April 28, 2025
- Preceded by: Churence Rogers

Personal details
- Born: January 16, 1998 (age 28) Clarenville, Newfoundland, Canada
- Party: Conservative
- Website: https://voterowe.ca/bio/

Jonathan J. Rowe MP (born January 16, 1998) is a Canadian politician serving as the Member of Parliament for The Eastern Peninsulas since 2025. He is a member of the Conservative Party of Canada.

== Federal politics ==
Rowe's Liberal competitor, Anthony Germain, initially won his seat by one of the smallest margins in the entire election, winning by just 12 votes. Due to the margin of victory being less than 1/1000 of the total votes cast, an automatic recount was triggered for the riding. On May 9, 2025, it was announced that a recount would take place in Marystown on May 12. On May 23, 2025, Rowe was declared the winner, having won by 12 votes.

== Electoral record ==
2025 Canadian federal election: Terra Nova—The Peninsulas
| Party | Candidate | Votes | % | ±% | Expenditures |
|---|---|---|---|---|---|
| Conservative | Jonathan Rowe | 19,605 | 47.73 | +7.28 | $101,953.74 |
| Liberal | Anthony Germain | 19,593 | 47.70 | +0.44 | $69,875.39 |
| New Democratic | Liam Ryan | 1,677 | 4.08 | -4.25 | $77.45 |
| Total valid votes/expense limit | | 41,073 | 98.57 | +0.19 | $133,640.03 |
| Total rejected ballots | | 597 | 1.43 | –0.19 | |
| Turnout | | 41,670 | 65.94 | | |
| Eligible voters | | 63,192 | | | |
| Conservative notional gain from Liberal | | Swing | | +3.42 | |
Source: Elections Canada
Note: This riding's results were subject to an automatic judicial recount on May 9, 2025. Number of eligible voters does not include voting day registrations.
