= 2017 Bonavista—Burin—Trinity federal by-election =

Local election in Newfoundland and Labrador, Canada

2017 Bonavista—Burin—Trinity by-election
← 2015	December 11, 2017	2019 →

Seat of Bonavista—Burin—Trinity
- Turnout: 21.52% (▼35.83pp)
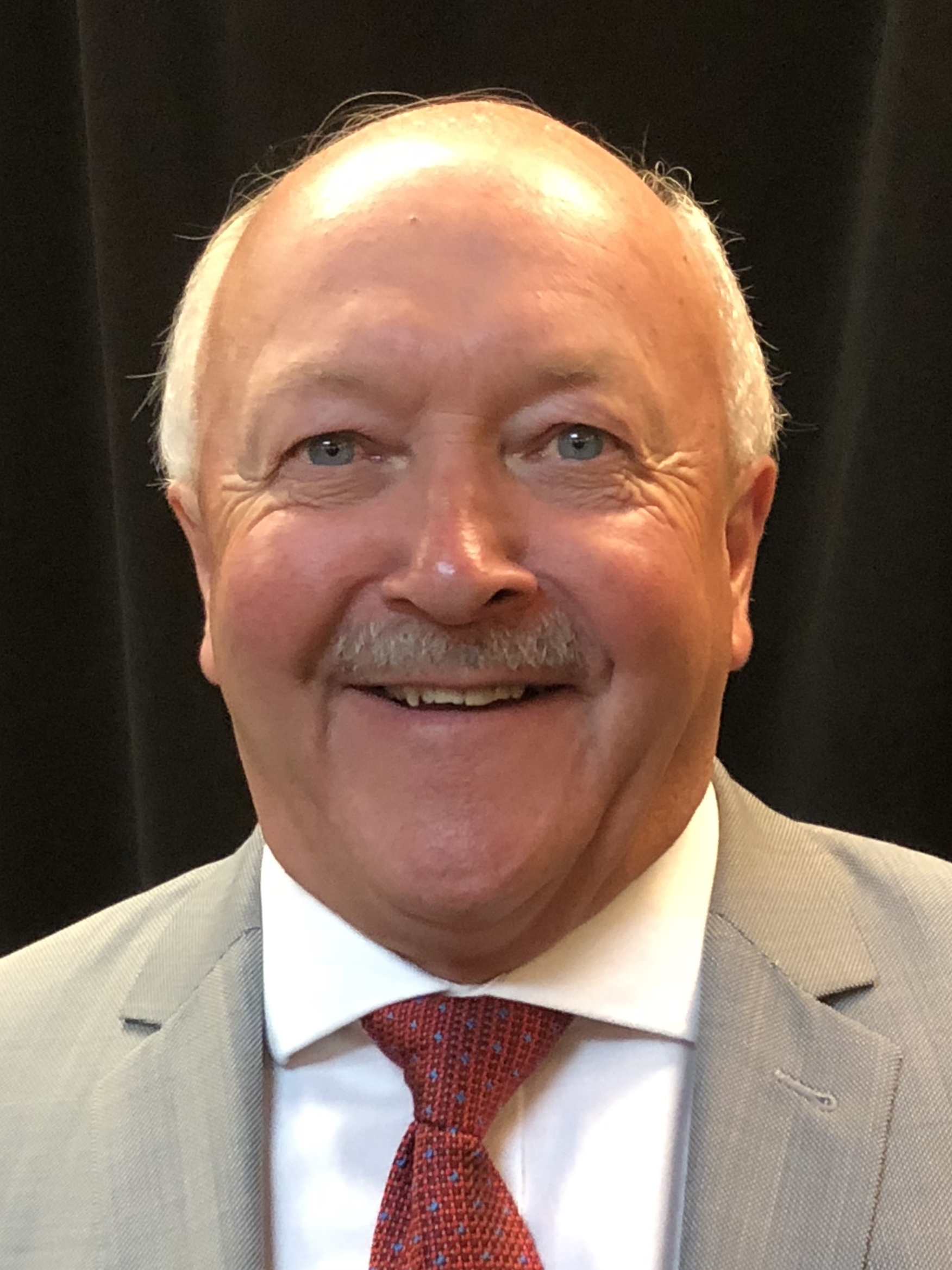
	First party	Second party
		CPC
Candidate	Churence Rogers	Mike Windsor
Party	Liberal	Conservative
Popular vote	8,717	2,878
Percentage	69.22%	22.85%
Swing	▼12.58pp	▲12.78pp
MP before election
Judy Foote
Liberal
Elected MP
Churence Rogers
Liberal

A by-election was held in the federal riding of Bonavista—Burin—Trinity in Newfoundland and Labrador on December 11, 2017 following the resignation of Liberal MP Judy Foote. The seat was held for the Liberals by Churence Rogers.

The by election was held on the same day as 3 others across Canada; Battlefords—Lloydminster in Alberta, Scarborough—Agincourt in Ontario and South Surrey—White Rock in British Columbia.

== Background ==
=== Constituency ===
Bonavista—Burin—Trinity is a rural constituency on Newfoundland Island. The riding contains the Bonavista Bay area, the Burin Peninsula and the Trinity Bay area of Newfoundland.

=== Representation ===
The riding is considered a safe seat for the Liberal Party of Canada. The seat was vacated effective September 30, 2017, following the resignation of Judy Foote, Minister of Public Services and Procurement, from cabinet on August 24, 2017, and her resignation from parliament due to an illness in her family on September 30.

== Campaign ==
Centreville-Wareham-Trinity Mayor and former president of the Federation of Municipalities in Newfoundland and Labrador Churence Rogers defeated comedian Pete Soucy, provincial and federal Liberal party organizer Larry Guinchard, RCMP officer Dale Foote, and North Harbour farmer, former search and rescue coordinator, and 2008 Conservative Party candidate in St. John's South—Mount Pearl Merv Wiseman for the Liberal nomination.

Teacher and guidance counsellor Mike Windsor was named the Conservative candidate. Windsor previously ran for the party in 2015 in the riding.

Tyler James Downey was named the NDP candidate.

Rumoured candidates for the Liberal nomination who ultimately did not run included former Progressive Conservative MHA Darin King and current Liberal MHAs Steve Crocker, Carol Anne Haley, and Dale Kirby. On September 22, 2017, MHA Mark Browne announced he would not be seeking the nomination. Lawyer Stacy MacDonald initially sought the Liberal nomination but withdrew on September 28.

In the 2015 federal election, Foote won the newly created riding with 81% of the vote, the highest percentage of vote taken by a candidate nationally in that election.

The Speaker's warrant regarding the vacancy was received on October 3, 2017; under the Parliament of Canada Act the writ for a by-election had to be dropped no later than April 1, 2018, 180 days after the Chief Electoral Officer was officially notified of the vacancy via a warrant issued by the Speaker.

== Results ==
Canadian federal by-election, December 11, 2017: Bonavista—Burin—Trinity Resignation of Judy Foote
Party	Candidate	Votes	%	±%	Expenditures
Liberal	Churence Rogers	8,717	69.22	-12.58	
Conservative	Mike Windsor	2,878	22.85	+12.78	
New Democratic	Tyler James Downey	598	4.75	-2.54	
Libertarian	Shane Stapleton	262	2.08	N/A	
Green	Tyler Colbourne	138	1.10	+0.25	
Total valid votes/Expense limit		12,593	100.00		101,914.76
Total rejected ballots		54	0.42	+0.7	
Turnout		12,648	21.52	-35.83	
Eligible voters		58,771			
Liberal hold		Swing		-12.68	

== 2015 result ==
2015 Canadian federal election: Bonavista—Burin—Trinity
Party	Candidate	Votes	%	±%	Expenditures
Liberal	Judy M. Foote	28,704	81.80	+27.33	$40,957.22
Conservative	Mike Windsor	3,534	10.07	–20.43	$7,929.44
New Democratic	Jenn Brown	2,557	7.29	–6.66	$616.65
Green	Tyler John Colbourne	297	0.85	–0.03	–
Total valid votes/expense limit		35,092	100.00		$214,042.22
Total rejected ballots		173	0.49	–	
Turnout		35,265	57.36	–	
Eligible voters		61,475			
Liberal notional hold		Swing		+23.88	
Source: Elections Canada,

2011 federal election redistributed results
Party	Vote	%
Liberal	16,805	54.46
Conservative	9,412	30.50
New Democratic	4,303	13.95
Green	270	0.88
Others	66	0.21
