= Health crisis =

Emergency or complex health system that affects the public

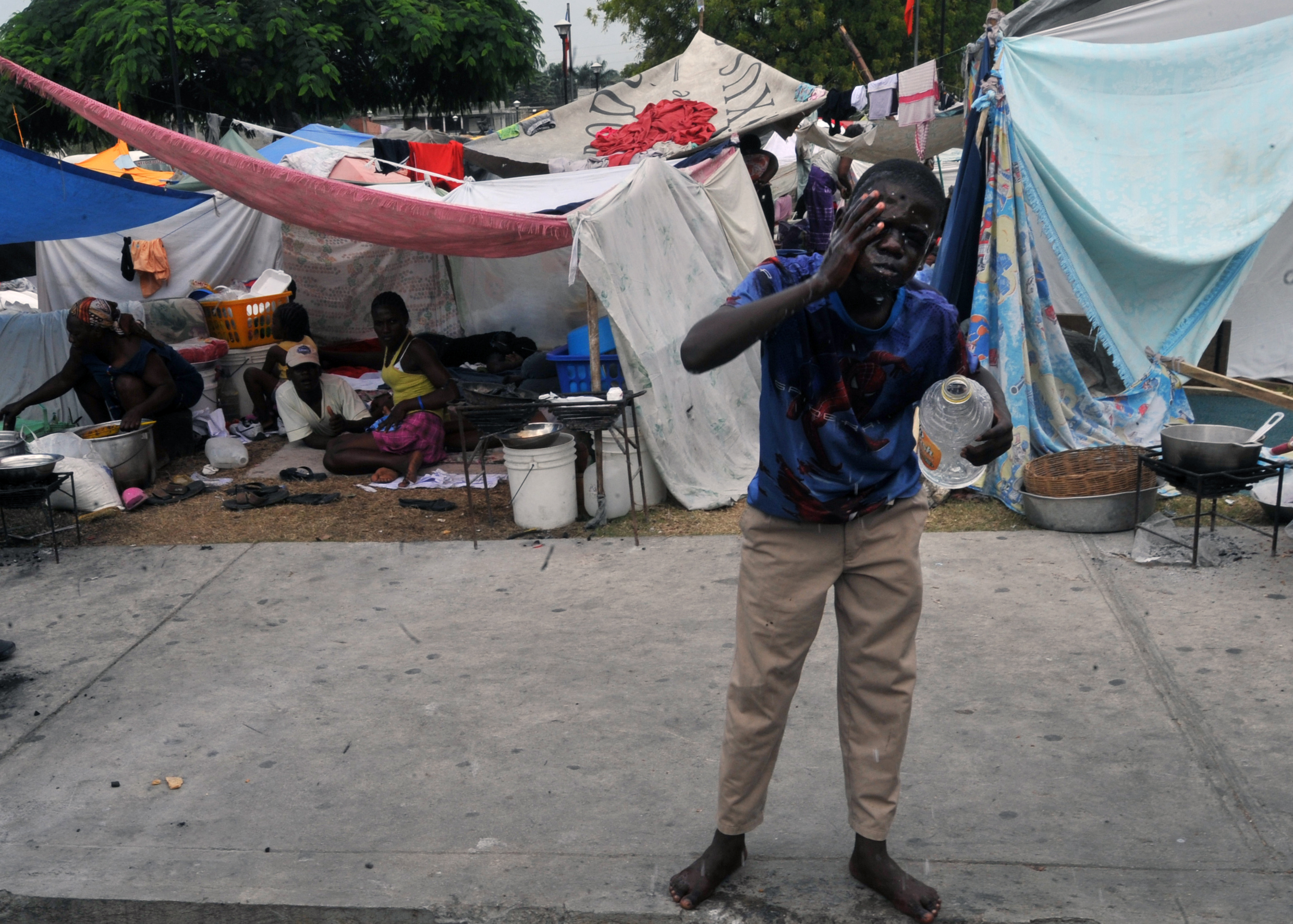
Many Haitians had to move to precarious camps when they lost their homes in the 2010 Haiti earthquake.

A health crisis is an emergency or complex health system that affects the public in one or more geographic areas from a particular locality to encompass the entire planet. Health crises generally have significant impacts on community health, loss of life, and on the economy. They may result from disease, industrial processes or poor policy.

Its severity is often measured by the number of people affected by its geographical extent, or the disease or death of the pathogenic process which it originates.

== Features ==
Generally there are three key components in health crises:

- Public health problem
- Problem health coordination
- Alarm care: Poor communication of risks to the population resulting in social upheaval.

=== Types ===
- Environmental
- Food
- Toxic

== Prevention & Control ==
- Using the health warning systems. A health system responsive to the needs of the population is required to refine the instruments to ensure adequate preparation before their hatching.
- Transparency of the institutions public or private. The perception of crisis can escape the control of experts or health institutions, and be determined by stakeholders to provide solutions propagate or concerned. This requires a difficult balancing of the need to articulate clear answers and the little-founded fears.
- Adequate information policy. Irrationality arise when information is distorted, or hidden. Face a health crisis involves: respect for society, coordination of organizations and an institution with scientific weight to the people and to the media, who acted as spokesman in situations of public health risk, to get confidence citizens. The technical capacity of health professionals is more proven than the public officials, which suggests a greater share of the former and better training of the second.
- Evaluate the previous crisis or others experiences. Crises are challenges that must be learned from both the mistakes and successes, since they serve to bring about to the devices and improve the response to other crises. It is important to perform analysis of previous responses, audit risk and vulnerability, research and testing, and drills to prepare themselves against future crises.
- Having objectives: "first, to reduce the impact of illness and death, and second, to avoid social fracture".
- Preparing contingency plans. Preparation is key to the crisis because it allows a strong response, organized, and scientifically based. Action plans must meet the professional early enough and properly trained, and politicians must be consistent in their actions and coordinate all available resources. It is essential to invest in public health resources to prepare preventive measures and reducing health inequalities to minimize the impact of health crises, as they generally always the poorest suffer most.
- It is important to include all health professions especially primary health care (family physicians, pharmacists, etc.), as often it is these practitioners that are on the front-line in health crises.

== Examples ==
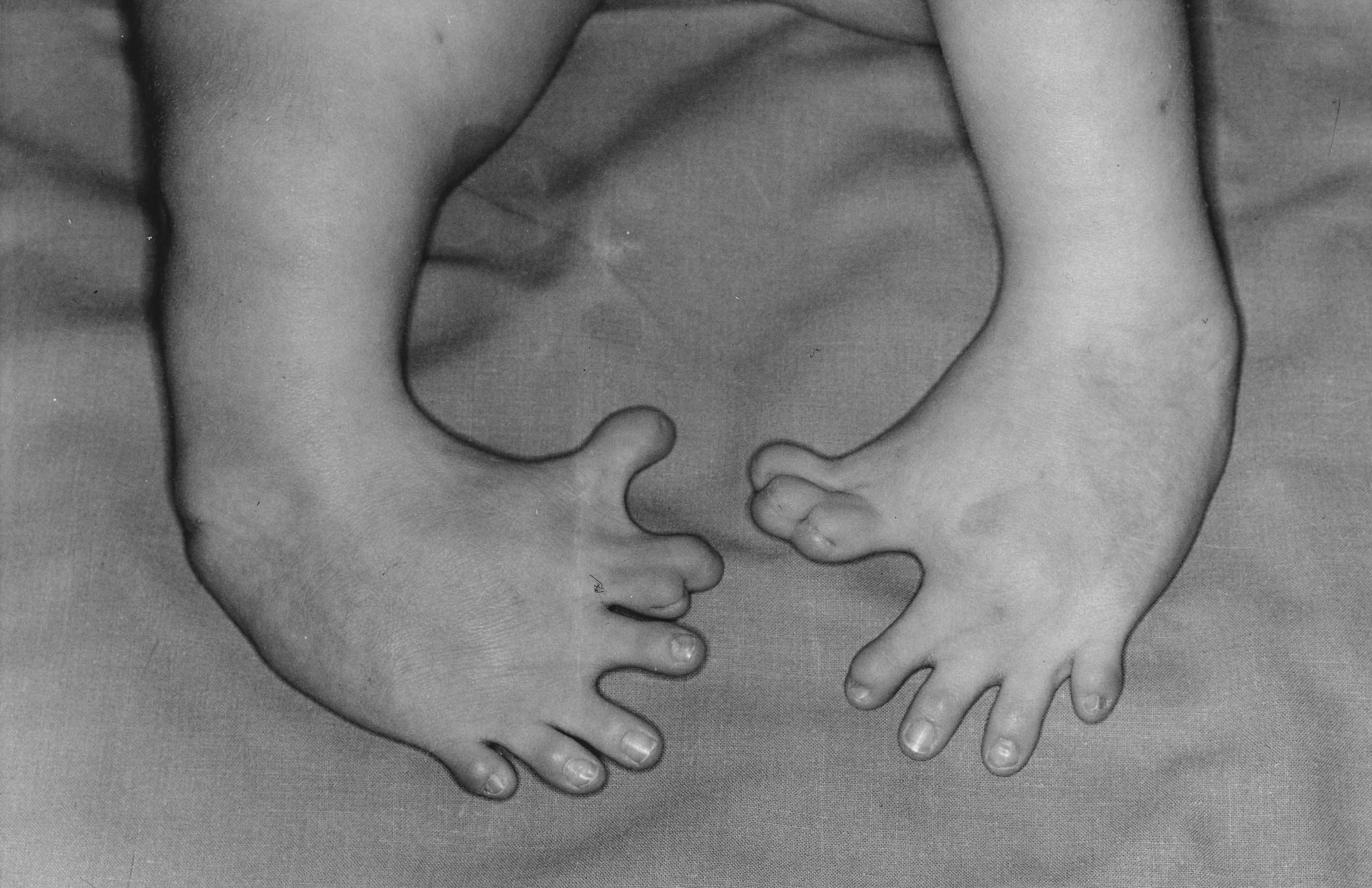
Baby born to a mother who had taken thalidomide while pregnant

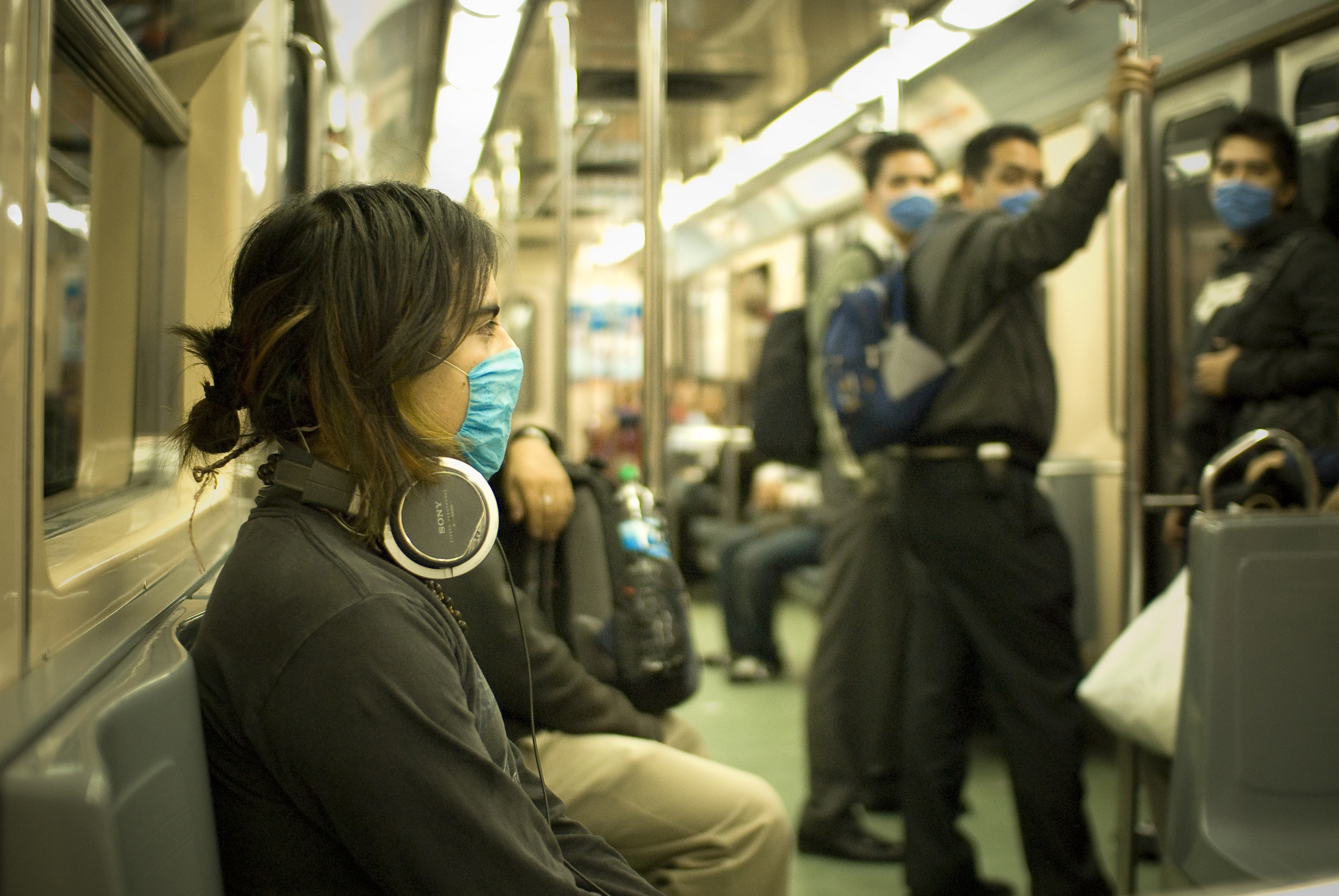
Metro of Mexico, passengers wearing face masks in the 2009 flu pandemic.

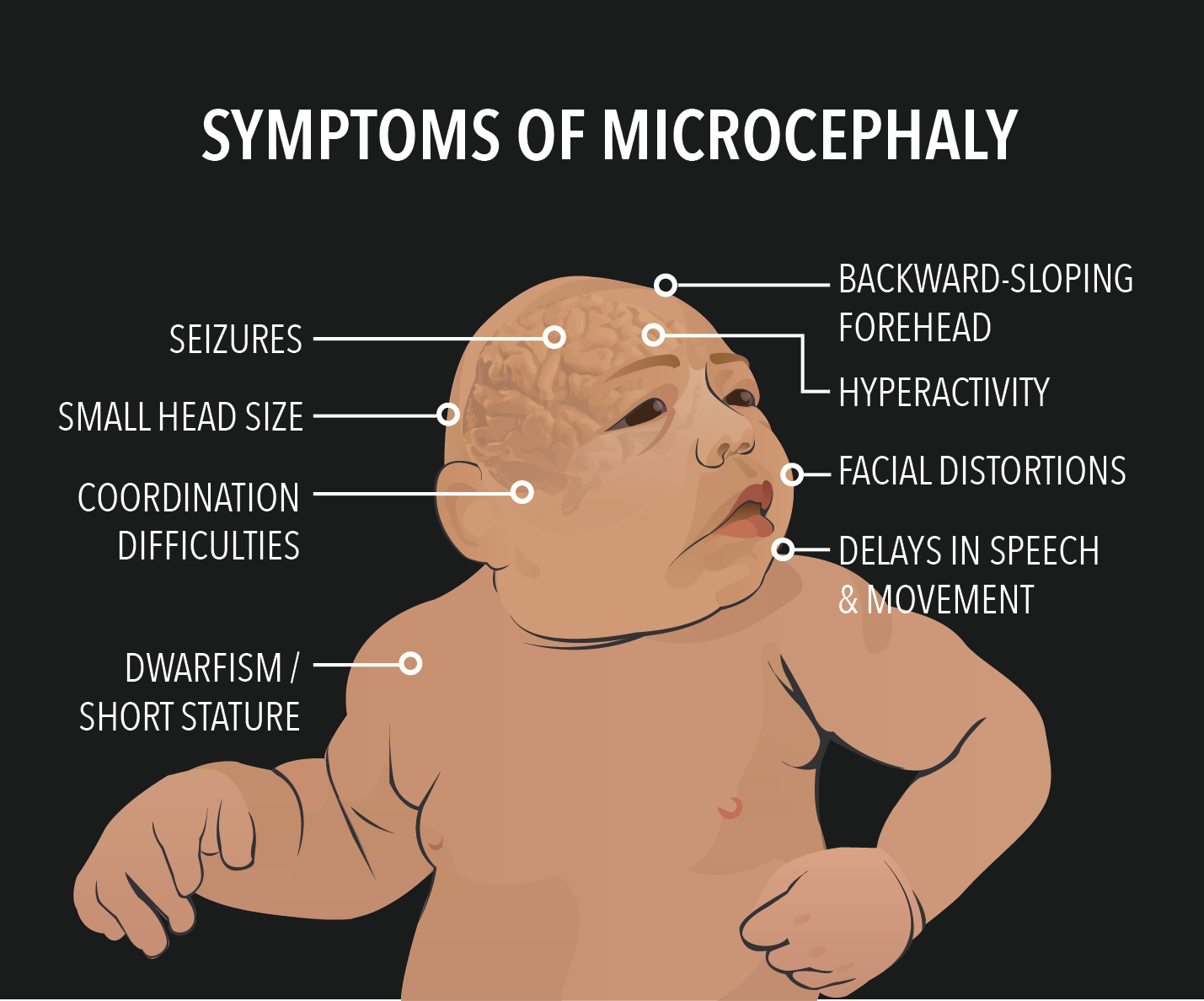
Symptoms of microcephaly, linked to mothers infected by Zika virus

- 1858: Swill milk scandal
- 1905: American meat scandal due to the publishing of Upton Sinclair's book The Jungle.
- 1918-1920: Spanish flu
- 1963: Birth defects by thalidomide
- 1981:
  - Toxic oil syndrome or simply toxic syndrome
  - HIV/AIDS
- 1996: Bovine spongiform encephalopathy (BSE), commonly known as mad-cow disease
- 1998: Doñana disaster, also known as the Aznalcollar Disaster or Guadiamar Disaster
- 2001: Anthrax attacks in the United States, also known as Amerithrax
- 2003: Severe acute respiratory syndrome (SARS)
- 2004: Avian influenza (H5N1), sometimes avian flu, and commonly bird flu
- 2006:
  - Côte d'Ivoire toxic waste dump
  - Trans fat toxicity
- 2007: Lead paint on toys from China
- 2008:
  - The 2008 Chinese milk scandal was a food safety incident in China, involving milk and infant formula, and other food materials and components, adulterated with melamine.
  - Canada listeriosis outbreak and Chile
- 2009: Pandemic H1N1/09 Influenza
- 2010: Haiti earthquake
- 2011:
  - Tōhoku earthquake and tsunami
  - E. coli O104:H4 outbreak
- 2012: Fraud on breast implants Poly Implant Prothèses (PIP)
- 2013-16: Ebola virus epidemic in West Africa
- 2015: Zika virus outbreak
- 2019: COVID-19 pandemic
- 2022: 2022 monkeypox outbreak
- 2024: Gaza Strip famine

== See also ==
- Global health
- Health policy
- Crisis theory
- Disease mongering
- Health administration
- Health care
- Health policy
- Health law
- Medicalization
- Primary health care
- Routine health outcomes measurement
- Thalidomide
- Universal health care

== Bibliography ==
- Bashir SA. Home Is Where the Harm Is: Inadequate Housing as a Public Health Crisis. American Journal of Public Health. 2002; 92(5):733-8.
- Gross J. The Next Public Health Crisis: Longevity. The New York Times. 2010/10/21.
- Navarro V. Spain is experiencing a Period of intense Social Crisis. Social Europe Journal. 12/11/2012.
