= Rosemarie Falk =

Canadian politician

Rosemarie Falk MP
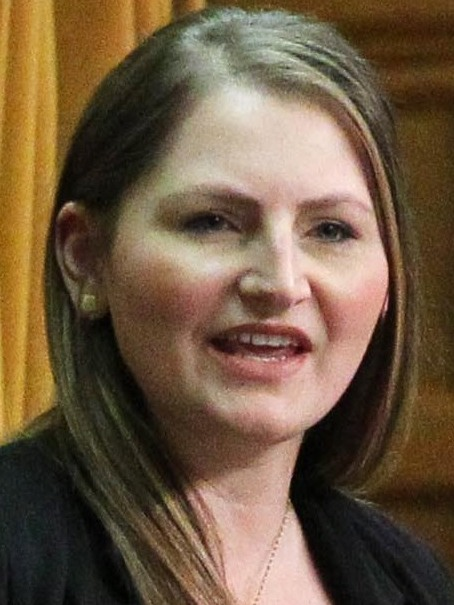
- Falk in 2018

Member of Parliament for Battlefords—Lloydminster—Meadow Lake Battlefords—Lloydminster (2017-2025)
- Incumbent
- Assumed office December 11, 2017
- Preceded by: Gerry Ritz

Personal details
- Born: 1988 (age 37–38) Lloydminster, Saskatchewan, Canada
- Party: Conservative
- Other political affiliations: Saskatchewan Party
- Spouse: Adam Falk
- Education: University of Calgary (BSW)

Rosemarie Ashley Falk MP is a Canadian politician from Saskatchewan, who has represented the riding of Battlefords—Lloydminster in the House of Commons of Canada since a by-election victory in 2017. She is a member of the Conservative Party of Canada caucus. Falk currently serves as the Deputy Shadow Minister for Families, Children and Social Development and Status of Women.

== Personal life ==
Rosemarie Falk was born and raised in Lloydminster, Saskatchewan. Falk holds a Bachelor of Social Work from the University of Calgary. Prior to her election, Falk worked in Saskatchewan as a registered Social Worker, and has experience as a legal assistant and as a legislative assistant in federal politics. Rosemarie Falk is a mother of three. At the time of her 2017 election, her occupation was listed as stay at home parent.

At the time of the 2025 Canadian federal election, she lived in Rural Municipality of Britannia No. 502.

== Political career ==
In the 2017 federal by-election, Rosemarie Falk ran as the Conservative candidate for Battlefords—Lloydminster, following the resignation of long-standing Conservative MP Gerry Ritz. Falk won the House of Commons seat with 8,952 votes of 12,876 votes cast, earning nearly 70% of the vote share. Falk defeated New Democratic Party candidate Matt Fedler, the Liberal Party's Larry Ingram, the Green Party's Yvonne Potter-Pihach and independent Ken Finlayson. Falk's 2017 campaign intended to present voters with the "positive Conservative vision" and advocated for affordability, consistent with Andrew Scheer's cost of living platform.

Rosemarie Falk was re-elected in the 2019 Canadian Federal election on October 21. Falk earned 79 percent of the vote with a total of 27,784 votes. Her closing statements from the Federal candidates Chamber forum were "together we can help elect a new Conservative government that will live within its means while putting more money in your pocket. On Oct. 21st, it is time for you to get ahead." Following her re-election, Falk released a statement that she was ready to return to Ottawa "focused on being a strong voice for Canadian taxpayers, families and rural communities like ours."

Falk was a member of the Human Resources, Skills and Social Development and the Status of Persons with Disabilities Parliament Session 42-1 from January 29, 2018, to September 11, 2019. Prior to her election to Parliament, Falk worked as an assistant to Conservative MP Arnold Viersen.

She was elected vice chair of the Canadian House of Commons Standing Committee on Human Resources, Skills and Social Development and the Status of Persons with Disabilities in the 45th Canadian Parliament in 2025.

== Political views ==
In her House of Commons Maiden Speech, Falk stated that she is proud to promote such Canadian values as "freedom of conscience, freedom of thought, and freedom of belief." Additionally, in this address, Falk called on the Canadian government for the removal of the "Liberal values test" from Canadian summer job applications. Falk supports the development of pipelines, as well as the Conservative three-point platform for environmental action. Falk also believes in a "compassionate, fair, and orderly legal immigration system."

== Controversy ==
Falk faced controversy for high-fiving Conservative MP Dane Lloyd after voting against Bill C-262 on May 30, 2018. Following social media backlash and public condemnation from First Nations National Chief Perry Bellegarde, Falk released a statement claiming that the high-five was unrelated to that particular vote. Bill C-262 was focused on aligning Canadian laws with the United Nations Declaration on the Rights of Indigenous Peoples

== Electoral record ==
2025 Canadian federal election: Battlefords—Lloydminster—Meadow Lake
** Preliminary results — Not yet official **
Party	Candidate	Votes	%	±%	Expenditures
Conservative	Rosemarie Falk	28,634	75.8	+7.10	
Liberal	Larry Ingram	7,073	18.7	+13.1	
Canadian Future	Darrell Patan	264	0.7	n/a	
New Democratic	William Petryk	1,816	4.8	-7.2	
Total valid votes/expense limit		37787			
Total rejected ballots		290			
Turnout		38,077	63.40		
Eligible voters		60,057			
Source: Elections Canada

2021 Canadian federal election: Battlefords—Lloydminster
Party	Candidate	Votes	%	±%	Expenditures
Conservative	Rosemarie Falk	21,336	68.7	-9.6	$59,048.66
New Democratic	Erik Hansen	3,718	12.0	+0.6	$12,928.01
Maverick	Ken Rutherford	2,162	7.0	–	$21,013.54
People's	Terry Sieben	1,847	5.9	+4.2	$0.00
Liberal	Larry Ingram	1,748	5.6	-1.2	$5,713.77
Green	Kerri Wall	237	0.8	-0.9	$0.00
Total valid votes/expense limit		31,048	99.4	+0.2	$112,669.55
Total rejected ballots		182	0.6	-0.2	
Turnout		31,230	61.88	-8.82	
Eligible voters		50,641			
Conservative hold		Swing		-5.1	
Source: Elections Canada

2019 Canadian federal election: Battlefords—Lloydminster
Party	Candidate	Votes	%	±%	Expenditures
Conservative	Rosemarie Falk	28,030	78.3	+8.74	$35,922.24
New Democratic	Marcella Pedersen	4,098	11.4	-1.77	$7,794.87
Liberal	Larry Ingram	2,426	6.8	-3.64	none listed
People's	Jason MacInnis	662	1.8	–	none listed
Green	David Kim-Cragg	605	1.7	+.15	$0.00
Total valid votes/expense limit		35,821	100.0		
Total rejected ballots		278			
Turnout		36,099	70.7		
Eligible voters		51,033			
Conservative hold		Swing		+5.26	
Source: Elections Canada

Canadian federal by-election, December 11, 2017: Battlefords—Lloydminster Resignation of Gerry Ritz
Party	Candidate	Votes	%	±%
Conservative	Rosemarie Falk	8,965	69.6 %	+8.60
New Democratic	Matt Fedler	1,698	13.2 %	-4.41
Liberal	Larry Ingram	1,345	10.4 %	-6.08
Green	Yvonne Potter-Pihach	200	1.6 %	-1.59
Independent	Ken Finlayson	681	5.3 %	N/A
Total valid votes/Expense limit			100.00	
Total rejected ballots				
Turnout				
Eligible voters				
Conservative hold		Swing		+6.51
