= Anthony Germain =

Canadian journalist

- Education: University of Western Ontario
- Spouse: Doris Cowley
- Presenting career
- Network: CBC Radio; CBC News Network

Anthony Germain is a Canadian retired journalist, best known for his work with CBC Radio.

== Journalism ==
A graduate of the journalism program at the University of Western Ontario, Germain spent 32 years as a journalist and host for the CBC, including stints as host of CBC Radio One's The House and Ottawa Morning on CBO-FM, and as a Shanghai-based foreign correspondent for CBC News. He received several nominations for the Canadian Association of Journalists awards for his reportage on China.

After relocating to his wife's hometown of St. John's in 2011, he hosted The St. John's Morning Show on CBC Radio One St. John's until 2017, then co-anchored CBC Newfoundland and Labrador's local newscast CBC Here & Now until 2022, finally hosting the provincial Radio One afternoon drive show On the Go until his retirement from the CBC in January 2024.

At that time, Germain had also been teaching journalism courses at the College of the North Atlantic.

== Federal politics ==
He was the Liberal Party candidate for Terra Nova—The Peninsulas in the 2025 Canadian federal election. After initially being declared the winner by 12 votes, Elections Canada announced on May 9 that the results were narrow enough for a judicial recount.

On May 23, 2025, it was announced that Germain lost the seat to Conservative candidate Jonathan Rowe by 12 votes.

At the time of the 2025 Canadian federal election, he lived in St. John's, Newfoundland and Labrador.

== Electoral record ==
2025 Canadian federal election: Terra Nova—The Peninsulas
Party	Candidate	Votes	%	±%	Expenditures
Conservative	Jonathan Rowe	19,605	47.73	+7.28	$101,953.74
Liberal	Anthony Germain	19,593	47.70	+0.44	$69,875.39
New Democratic	Liam Ryan	1,677	4.08	-4.25	$77.45
Total valid votes/expense limit		41,073	98.57	+0.19	$133,640.03
Total rejected ballots		597	1.43	–0.19	
Turnout		41,670	65.94		
Eligible voters		63,192			
Conservative notional gain from Liberal		Swing		+3.42	
Source: Elections Canada
Note: This riding's results were subject to an automatic judicial recount on May 9, 2025. Number of eligible voters does not include voting day registrations.
