= 2008 Canadian listeriosis outbreak =

Disease outbreak in Canada

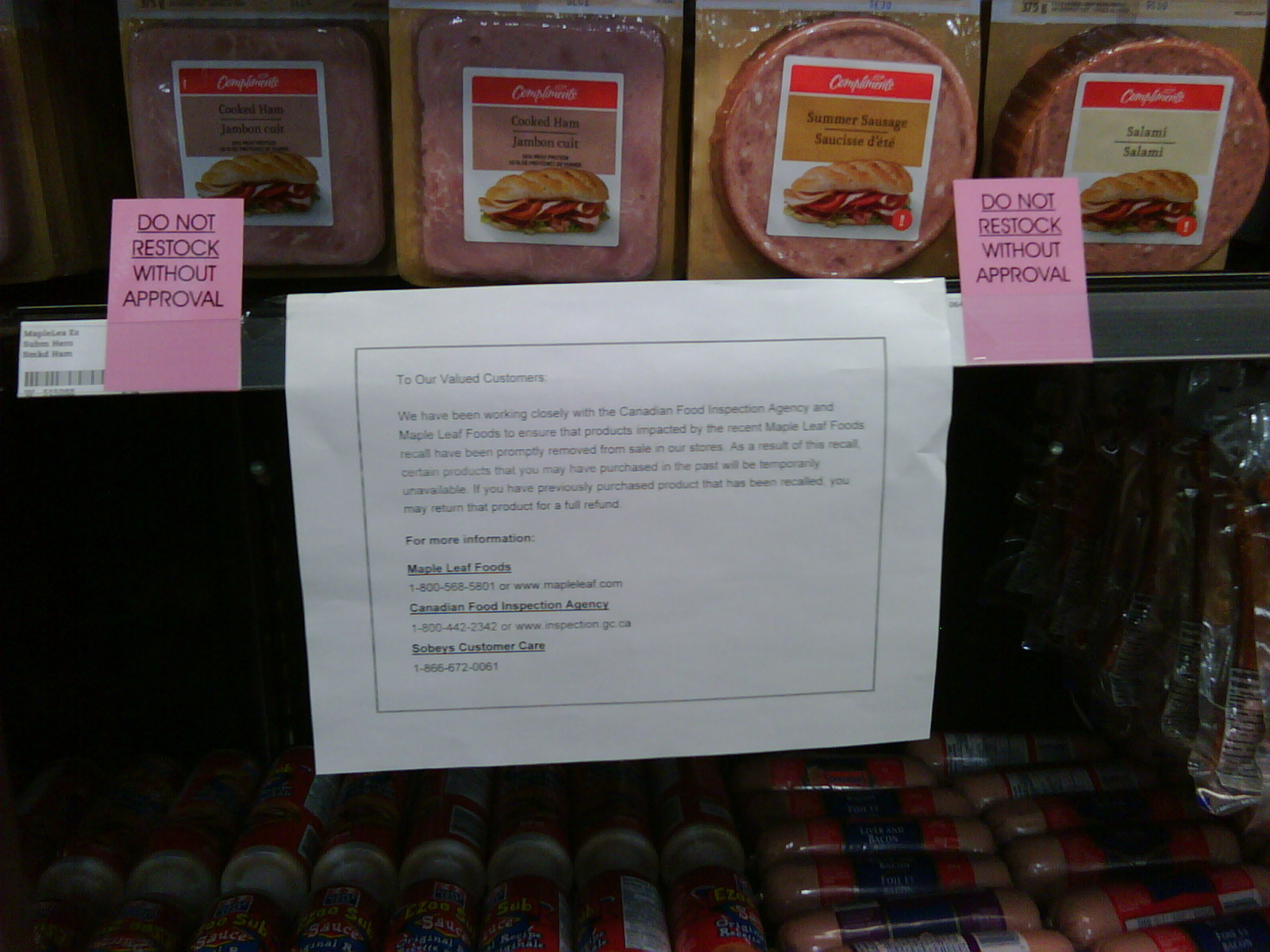
- A meat recall notice placed in the deli section of Sobeys grocery store
- Date: August 2008 to December 2008
- Location: Canada
- Deaths: 23
- Injuries: 35

The 2008 Canadian listeriosis outbreak was a widespread outbreak of listeriosis in Canada linked to cold cuts from a Maple Leaf Foods plant in Toronto, Ontario. There were 57 total confirmed cases, resulting in 23 deaths.

== Origin and spread ==
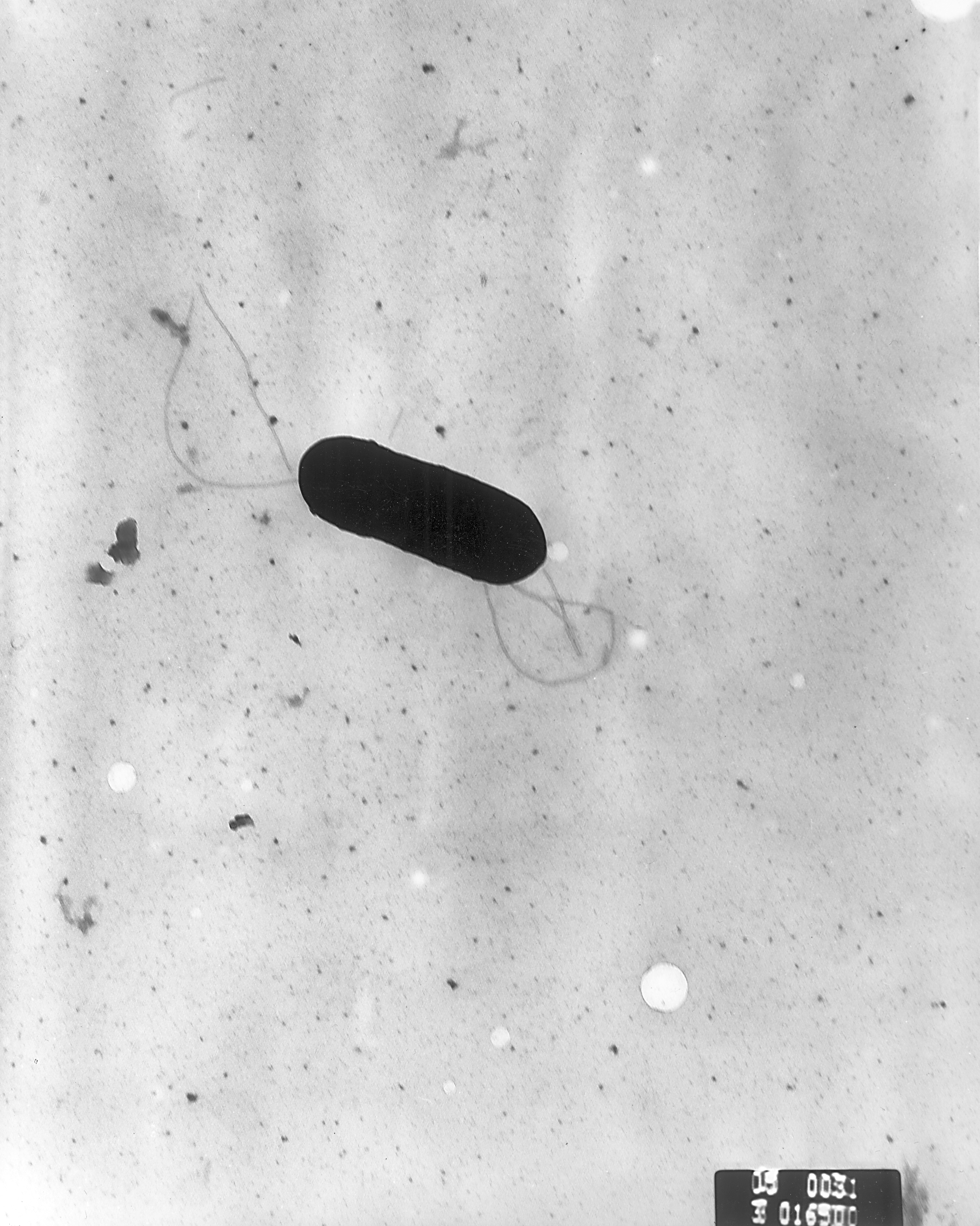
Listeria monocytogenes, the bacterium responsible for listeriosis

Listeriosis is an infection caused by the bacterium Listeria monocytogenes. The outbreak originated from lines 8 and 9 of the Maple Leaf Foods Bartor Road facility (Establishment No. 97B) in Toronto, Ontario. There were about 220 possibly contaminated products, each stamped with the code "97B" near the "Best before" date. Since the bacteria travelled through deli meats, which are cooked (and as a result are usually free of pathogens), the contamination likely occurred during packaging. The outbreak was first noticed in July 2008 when regular surveillance detected an increase in cases reported. Federal inspectors usually spent less than 5 hours a day at the plant in the months before the outbreak of the illness, sometimes as little as 70 minutes.

== Response from Maple Leaf Foods ==
Maple Leaf Foods had instituted a voluntary recall before the outbreak was linked to their plant; upon confirming the link, they expanded the recall to all products from the Bartor Road facility. In a press conference, President and CEO of Maple Leaf Foods Michael McCain stated, "Tragically, our products have been linked to illness and loss of life. To those people who are ill, and to the families who have lost loved ones, I offer my deepest and sincerest sympathies. Words cannot begin to express our sadness for their pain."

Officials from Maple Leaf believe that the outbreak originated sometime in July 2008 on line 8 or line 9 of the North York facility. Regardless, the entire plant underwent intense sanitation, which began August 21. About 80 workers were involved in the cleanup, with additional outside experts and microbiologists supervising the operation. They used peroxyacetic acid, quaternary ammonium compound, isopropyl alcohol, refrigeration gel and a granular compound to disinfect the parts of the apparatuses. About 600 employees were to attend a four-hour training session on Listeria and on cleanliness, and about 250 employees were laid off while the plant was being cleaned.

The recall reportedly cost the company $20 million, about ten times the original estimate.

== Political responses ==
Ontario Premier Dalton McGuinty credited the discovery of the outbreak to an early-warning system implemented after the 2003 SARS outbreak in Toronto. Canadian Health Minister Tony Clement stated that he expected the number of cases to rise with time, since the bacteria have a lengthy incubation period. Minister of Agriculture Gerry Ritz stated at a news conference: "Let me state on behalf of the government that our thoughts and prayers are with the family and friends of those that are affected [...] And of course, I'd like to reiterate that our highest priority continues to be making sure that Canadian families' food supply is safe."

On the federal political level, there was a debate on the privatization of food inspection. A cabinet document leaked earlier in the year outlined a plan to save money at the Canadian Food Inspection Agency (CFIA) by shifting federal meat inspectors into an oversight role and leaving companies to implement their own methods. Liberal leader Stéphane Dion was harshly critical and drew comparisons to the 2000 Walkerton tainted water tragedy and the privatization of propane inspection, which he blamed for the 2008 Toronto explosions. Gerry Ritz responded that the CFIA had added 200 inspectors since the Conservatives came to power, adding, "As opposed to having our inspectors standing line by line, they'll have a more oversight role within the plant itself [...] We're trying to build a better mousetrap here." New Democratic Party agriculture critic Alex Atamanenko said he strongly opposed the apparent privatization plans.

=== Gerry Ritz comments ===
On September 17, 2008, Agricultural Minister Gerry Ritz made national news when comments he made on an August 30, 2008 conference call with government officials were made public. Ritz was quoted as saying, "This is like a death by a thousand cuts. Or should I say cold cuts." Then, when told of a death in Prince Edward Island, Ritz said, "Please tell me it's (Liberal MP) Wayne Easter." Ritz apologized for his remarks, but various groups called for his resignation. New Democratic Party Leader Jack Layton responded by saying, "Canadians are dying because of the mismanagement of our government... there should absolutely never be that kind of humour.... It illustrates the government is not taking this matter as seriously as they should." A spokesman for Prime Minister Harper released a statement saying Ritz's comments were tasteless and completely inappropriate. Stephen Harper refused to seek Ritz's resignation.

== Class-action lawsuits ==
Four separate class-action lawsuits were filed in Ontario, Quebec, Saskatchewan, and British Columbia. The lawsuit in Ontario claimed damages of $350 million. All lawsuits were filed by Merchant Law Group.

The lawsuits were settled in December 2008 for $27 million.

A court order for a "Pro Rata Reduction to all entitlements" was ordered, meaning that all claims were delivered at 93.04% of the original agreement. Claimants had until August 1, 2012, to cash their cheques.

== See also ==
- Health crisis
- List of foodborne illness outbreaks
- 2008–2009 Chile listeriosis outbreak
