= Gerry Ritz =

Canadian politician (born 1951)

The Honourable Gerry Ritz PC
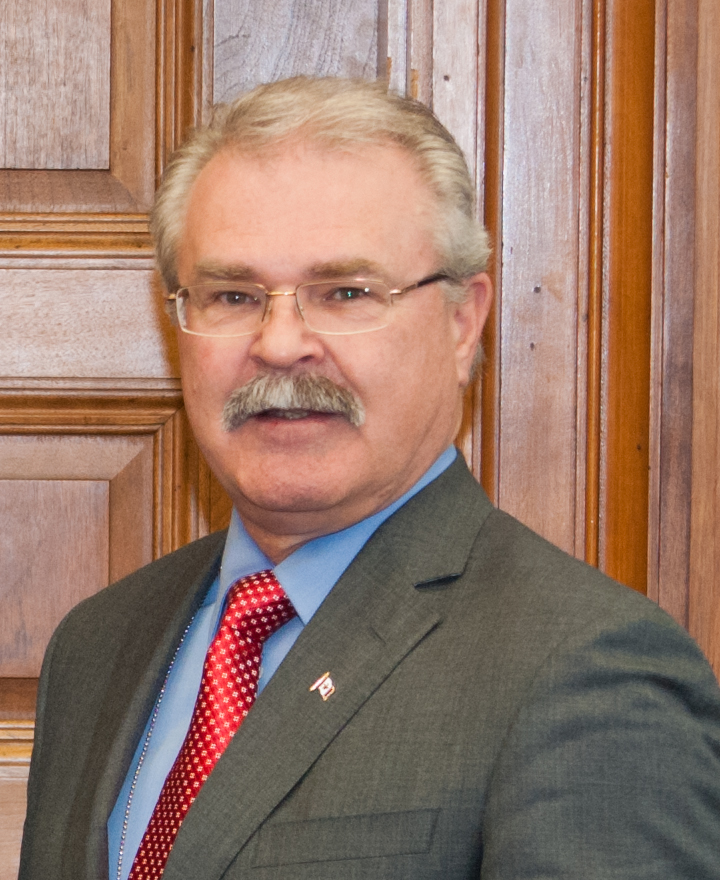

Official Opposition Critic for International Trade
- In office November 20, 2015 – August 29, 2017
- Leader: Rona Ambrose; Andrew Scheer
- Preceded by: Don Davies
- Succeeded by: Dean Allison

Member of Parliament for Battlefords—Lloydminster
- In office June 2, 1997 – October 2, 2017
- Preceded by: Len Taylor
- Succeeded by: Rosemarie Falk

Minister of Agriculture and Agri-Food
- In office August 14, 2007 – November 4, 2015
- Prime Minister: Stephen Harper
- Preceded by: Chuck Strahl
- Succeeded by: Lawrence MacAulay

Chair of the Standing Committee on Agriculture
- In office May 4, 2006 – February 1, 2007
- Minister: Chuck Strahl
- Preceded by: Paul Steckle
- Succeeded by: James Bezan

Personal details
- Born: August 19, 1951 (age 75) Delisle, Saskatchewan, Canada
- Party: Conservative
- Other political affiliations: Saskatchewan United Party; Reform (1997–2000); Canadian Alliance (2000–2003)
- Spouse: Judy Fleury
- Profession: Construction contractor, politician

Gerry Ritz PC (born August 19, 1951) is a former Canadian politician. He served as member of the House of Commons of Canada for Battlefords—Lloydminster from 1997 until his resignation in 2017. He served as Canada's agriculture minister from 2007 through 2015 under Prime Minister Stephen Harper.

== Life and pre-political career ==
Ritz was born in Delisle, Saskatchewan, and prior to his political career, he worked as a farmer at the family farm for over 20 years and owned a contracting business company.

== Federal politics ==
Ritz was elected as the Reform Party candidate in the 1997 general election and then re-elected with the Canadian Alliance in the 2000 election and the Conservative Party of Canada in the 2004 election. Ritz served as vice-chair of the House of Commons Agriculture Committee from 2002 to 2007. He was appointed minister of state for small business and tourism in the Harper government on January 4, 2007.

=== Minister of Agriculture ===
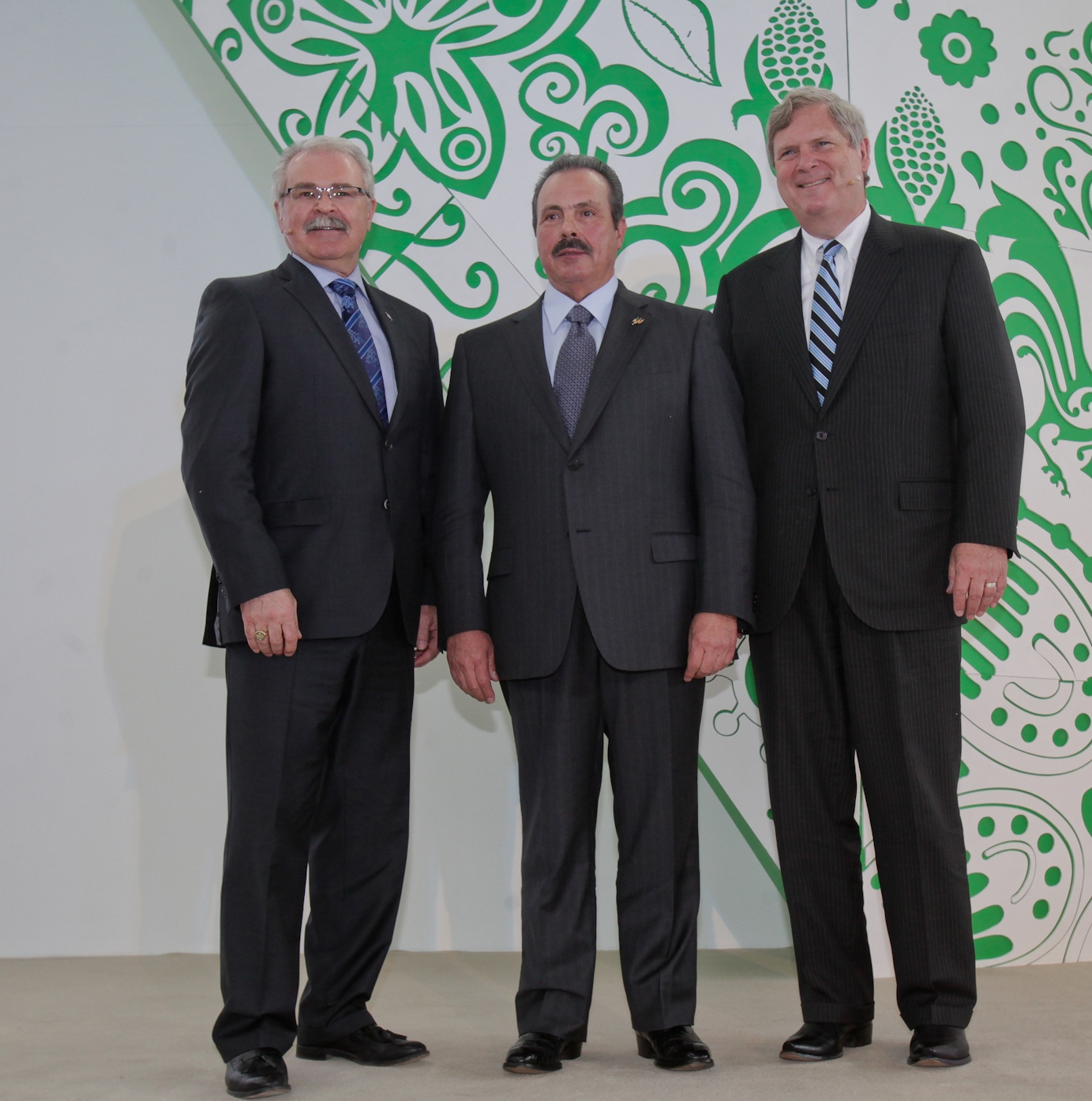
Canadian Minister of Agriculture Gerry Ritz, Mexico Secretary of Agriculture, Livestock, Rural Development, Fisheries and Food Martinez y Martinez, and U.S. Agriculture Secretary Tom Vilsack

On August 14, 2007, Ritz was promoted to the Cabinet as Minister of Agriculture and Agri-Food replacing Chuck Strahl.

Ritz made national news when, in response to the 2008 Canadian listeriosis outbreak he was quoted as saying, "This is like a death by a thousand cuts. Or should I say cold cuts." Then when told of a death in Prince Edward Island, Ritz said, "Please tell me it's (Liberal MP) Wayne Easter." Ritz later apologized for his comments, and Prime Minister Stephen Harper kept Ritz in Cabinet after the 2008 Canadian general election.

In September 2012, E. coli bacteria was found in meat from the XL Foods plant in Brooks, Alberta. This led to over 1800 products being recalled across Canada and the United States. The U.S. Department of Agriculture estimated that 1.1 million kilograms of meat from XL Foods were recalled from American stores. This was also the largest beef recall in Canadian history, with meat being recalled in every province and territory in Canada and 41 American states.

=== Opposition MP and resignation from politics ===
Ritz announced on August 31, 2017, that he intended to resign from the House of Commons in the near future and leave politics to spend more time with family.

On September 19, 2017, Ritz caused controversy when he tweeted a link to a news story stating no industrialized nations were on pace to meet Paris Agreement carbon emission targets with the comment "Has anyone told our climate Barbie! [sic]" (referring to Environment Minister Catherine McKenna). Ritz deleted the original post within 20 minutes, afterward posted another message stating: "I apologize for the use of Barbie, it is not reflective of the role the Minister plays". Conservative leader Andrew Scheer condemned Ritz's comment later in the day and stated he would reach out to McKenna personally to "assure the minister that this type of behavior has no place in the Conservative caucus". The next day Ritz's office issued a statement confirming his resignation from the House of Commons effective October 2, 2017.

Ritz's successor, Rosemarie Falk, was elected in a by-election on December 11, 2017.

== Post federal politics ==
In 2020, Ritz was elected as the reeve for the Rural Municipality of Mervin No. 499.

In 2022, he was involved in helping create the Saskatchewan United Party.

== Electoral record ==
2015 Canadian federal election: Battlefords—Lloydminster
Party	Candidate	Votes	%	±%	Expenditures
Conservative	Gerry Ritz	20,547	61.01	-4.94	$70,973.30
New Democratic	Glenn Tait	5,930	17.61	-10.45	$6,284.73
Liberal	Larry Ingram	5,550	16.48	+13.10	$17,912.01
Independent	Doug Anguish	1,076	3.19	n/a	–
Green	Mikaela Tenkink	575	1.71	-0.90	$56.97
Total valid votes/expense limit		33,678	99.45		$214,778.83
Total rejected ballots		186	0.55	–	
Turnout		33,864	66.51	–	
Eligible voters		50,917			
Conservative hold		Swing		+2.76	
Source: Elections Canada

2011 Canadian federal election: Battlefords—Lloydminster
Party	Candidate	Votes	%	±%	Expenditures
Conservative	(x) Gerry Ritz	19,203	66.9	+6.8	$57,125
New Democratic	Glenn Tait	7,767	27.1	+1.8	$57,552
Liberal	Jordan LaPlante	950	3.3	-4.9	$4,043
Green	Norbert Kratchmer	785	2.7	-2.3	$345
Total valid votes/expense limit		28,705	100.0		–
Total rejected ballots		109	0.4	0.0	
Turnout		28,814	58.2	+7	
Eligible voters		49,530	–	–	

2008 Canadian federal election: Battlefords—Lloydminster
Party	Candidate	Votes	%	±%	Expenditures
Conservative	(x) Gerry Ritz	15,621	60.1	+6.1	$60,942
New Democratic	Bob Woloshyn	6,572	25.3	+9.6	$52,759
Liberal	Greg Nyholt	2,140	8.2	-4.6	–
Green	Norbert Kratchmer	1,287	5.0	+2.9	$4,638
Christian Heritage	Harold Stephan	368	1.4	+0.4	$6
Total valid votes/expense limit		25,988	100.0		$87,340
Total rejected ballots		96	0.4	+0.1	
Turnout		26,084	51	-9	

2006 Canadian federal election: Battlefords—Lloydminster
Party	Candidate	Votes	%	±%	Expenditures
Conservative	(x) Gerry Ritz	16,491	54.1	-4.2	$54,526
New Democratic	Elgin Wyatt	4,829	15.7	-4.6	$20,468
Independent	Jim Pankiw	4,396	14.4	–	$77,133
Liberal	Dominic LaPlante	3,901	12.8	-4.6	–
Green	Norbert Kratchmer	637	2.1	-0.8	$145
Christian Heritage	Harold Stephan	306	1.0	-0.2	$562
Total valid votes		30,560	100.0		–
Total rejected ballots		89	0.3	-0.1	
Turnout		30,649	60	+8	

2004 Canadian federal election: Battlefords—Lloydminster
Party	Candidate	Votes	%	±%	Expenditures
Conservative	(x) Gerry Ritz	15,441	58.3	-7.0	$45,813
New Democratic	Shawn McKee	5,367	20.2	+2.9	$41,961
Liberal	Del Price	4,617	17.4	+0.1	$32,265
Green	Kelsey Pearson	766	2.9	–	
Christian Heritage	Diane Stephan	316	1.2	–	
Total valid votes		26,507	100.0		–
Total rejected ballots		94	0.4		
Turnout		26,601	52	-8.3	

2000 Canadian federal election: Battlefords—Lloydminster
Party	Candidate	Votes	%	±%	Expenditures
Alliance	(x) Gerry Ritz	17,691	60.2	+17.5	$43,761
New Democratic	Elgin Wayne Wyatt	5,107	17.4	-10.4	$22,558
Liberal	Peter Frey	5,098	17.4	-2.7	$15,510
Progressive Conservative	Harry Zamonsky	1,474	5.0	-4.4	$3,102
Total valid votes		29,370	100.0		–
Total rejected ballots		107	0.4		
Turnout		29,477	60	-3.3	

1997 Canadian federal election: Battlefords—Lloydminster
Party	Candidate	Votes	%	±%	Expenditures
Reform	Gerry Ritz	13,125	42.7	–	$37,206
New Democratic	(x) Len Taylor	8,535	27.8	–	$49,152
Liberal	Glenn Hornick	6,155	20.0	–	$43,136
Progressive Conservative	Ken Ritter	2,888	9.4	–	$22,635
Total valid votes		30,703	100.0		–
Total rejected ballots		91	0.3		
Turnout		30,794	63		

28th Canadian Ministry (2006–2015) – Cabinet of Stephen Harper
Cabinet post (1)
Predecessor	Office	Successor
Chuck Strahl	Minister of Agriculture and Agri-Food; August 14, 2007 – November 3, 2015	Lawrence MacAulay
Sub-Cabinet Post
Predecessor	Title	Successor
New position	Secretary of State (Small Business & Tourism) (January 4, 2007 – July 13, 2007)	Diane Ablonczy
