= Churence Rogers =

Canadian politician

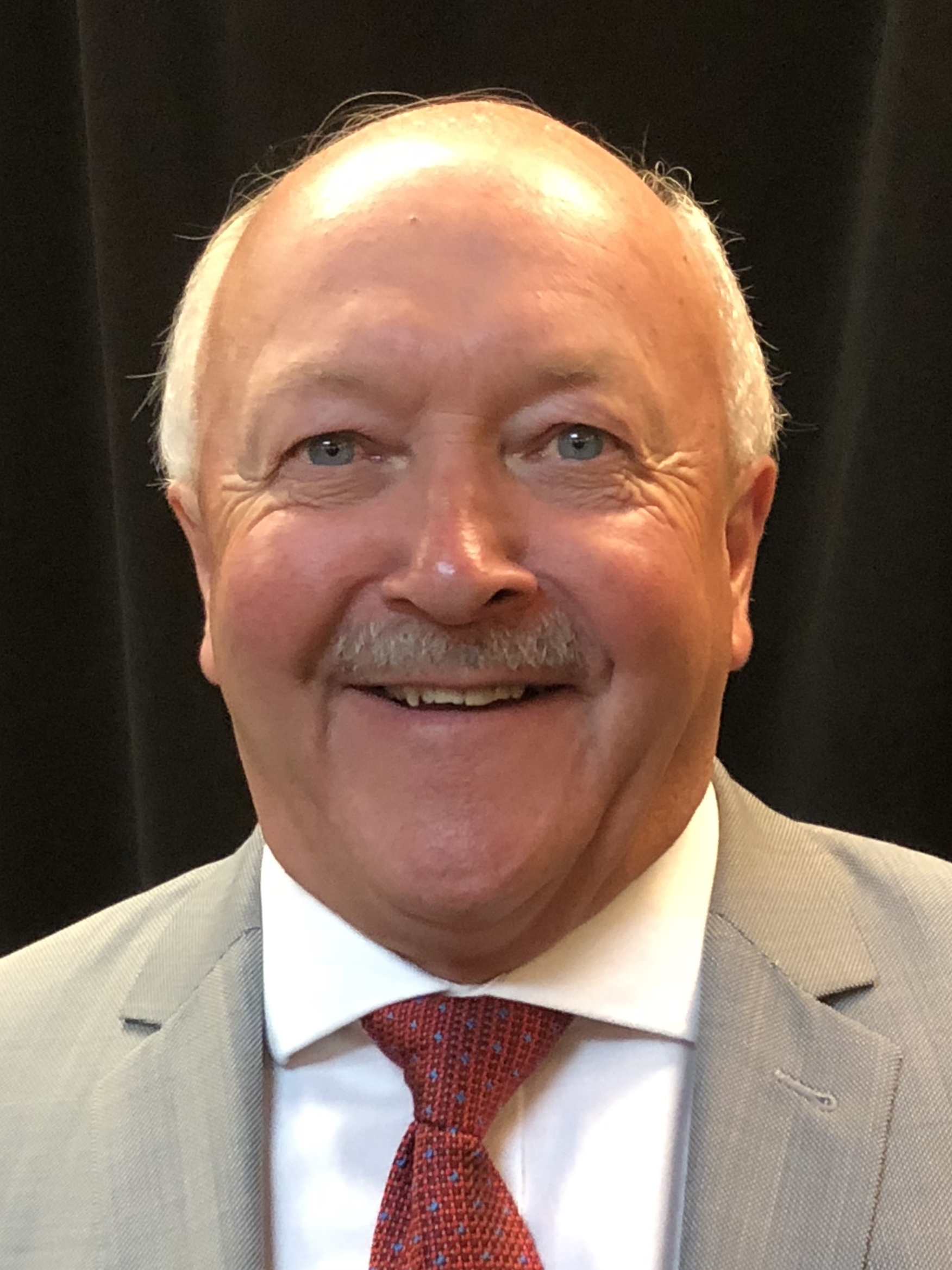
- Churence Rogers in June 2018

Member of Parliament for Bonavista—Burin—Trinity
- In office December 11, 2017 – March 23, 2025
- Preceded by: Judy Foote
- Succeeded by: Jonathan Rowe

Personal details
- Born: June 3, 1953 (age 73); Centreville-Wareham-Trinity, Newfoundland, Canada
- Party: Liberal
- Website: http://crogers.liberal.ca/

Churence Rogers (born June 3, 1953) is a Canadian politician from Newfoundland and Labrador, who was elected to the House of Commons of Canada in a by-election on December 11, 2017. He represented the electoral district of Bonavista—Burin—Trinity as a member of the Liberal Party of Canada caucus until 2025.

== Early life ==
Churence Rogers was born and raised in Centreville-Wareham-Trinity.

== Political career ==
Rogers served as Centreville-Wareham-Trinity mayor from 2009 to 2017, and previously served as mayor of Harbour Breton from 1997 to 2003.

From 2011 to 2015, Rogers also served as president of Municipalities Newfoundland and Labrador (MNL). Under his leadership, MNL negotiated a new fiscal framework arrangement with the provincial government that invested millions of dollars annually into municipalities across Newfoundland and Labrador, helping to improve the lives of families throughout our province. At the same time, he served on the national board of directors for the Federation of Canadian Municipalities, and as the chair of its Atlantic Caucus.

=== Federal politics ===
Rogers was elected as member of parliament for the riding of Bonavista—Burin—Trinity in a by-election on December 11, 2017.

Rogers serves on the House of Commons Standing Committee on the Environment and Sustainability. He briefly served as a member of the Standing Joint Committee on the Scrutiny of Regulations before being selected to sit on the House of Commons Standing Committee on Fisheries and Oceans. He is a member of the Newfoundland and Labrador Caucus, Atlantic Caucus and Rural Caucus. Churence is also a member of the Canada-United States Interparliamentary Group, the Canada-China Parliamentary Legislative Association, and the Canada-Taiwan Parliamentary Friendship Group.

Rogers was re-elected in the 2019 and 2021 federal elections.

== Personal life ==
Rogers and his wife Yvonne have two children and four grandchildren.

== Electoral record ==
=== Federal results ===
2021 Canadian federal election: Bonavista—Burin—Trinity
Party	Candidate	Votes	%	±%	Expenditures
Liberal	Churence Rogers	13,972	46.59	+0.88	$68,517.84
Conservative	Sharon Vokey	12,278	40.94	+1.48	$0.00
New Democratic	Anne Marie Anonsen	2,484	8.28	-3.70	$393.05
People's	Linda Hogan	1,257	4.19	–	$0.00
Total valid votes/expense limit		29,991	98.42		$110,716.47
Total rejected ballots		482	1.58	-0.28	
Turnout		30,473	51.12	-3.37	
Registered voters		59,605			
Liberal hold		Swing		-0.30	
Source: Elections Canada

2019 Canadian federal election: Bonavista—Burin—Trinity
Party	Candidate	Votes	%	±%	Expenditures
Liberal	Churence Rogers	14,707	45.70	-23.52	$23,874.25
Conservative	Sharon Vokey	12,697	39.46	+16.65	none listed
New Democratic	Matthew Cooper	3,855	11.98	+7.25	$6.68
Green	Kelsey Reichel	920	2.86	+1.80	none listed
Total valid votes/expense limit		32,179	98.14	-1.42	107,548.45
Total rejected ballots		609	1.85	+1.43	
Turnout		32,788	55.83	+34.28	
Eligible voters		58,729			
Liberal hold		Swing		-20.09	
Source: Elections Canada

Canadian federal by-election, December 11, 2017: Bonavista—Burin—Trinity Resignation of Judy Foote
Party	Candidate	Votes	%	±%
Liberal	Churence Rogers	8,717	69.2	-12.60
Conservative	Mike Windsor	2,878	22.9	+12.83
New Democratic	Tyler James Downey	598	4.7	-2.59
Libertarian	Shane Stapleton	262	2.1	N/A
Green	Tyler Colbourne	138	1.1	+0.25
Total valid votes/Expense limit			100.00	
Total rejected ballots				
Turnout		12,953	21.43	
Eligible voters		58,771		

=== Provincial results ===
2003 Newfoundland and Labrador general election: Bonavista North
Party	Candidate	Votes	%	±%
Progressive Conservative	Harry Harding	3384	58.33%	+1.26%
Liberal	Churence Rogers	2301	39.67%	-2.67%
New Democratic	E. Howard Parsons	116	2.00%	+1.42%
