= The Eastern Peninsulas =

Federal electoral district in Newfoundland and Labrador, Canada

Newfoundland and Labrador electoral district
- Interactive map of riding boundaries from the 2025 federal election

Federal electoral district
- Legislature: House of Commons
MP
Jonathan Rowe
Conservative
- District created: 2013
- First contested: 2015
- Last contested: 2025
- District webpage: profile, map

Demographics
- Population (2021): 71,898
- Electors (2025): 62,755
- Area (km²): 16,529.46
- Pop. density (per km²): 4.3
- Census division(s): Division No. 1, Division No. 2, Division No. 3, Division No. 7, Division No. 8
- Census subdivision(s): Clarenville, Marystown, Placentia, Bonavista, Burin, Grand Bank, New-Wes-Valley, Glovertown, Gambo, Trinity Bay North

The Eastern Peninsulas (French: Les Péninsules-Est; formerly Bonavista—Burin—Trinity and Terra Nova—The Peninsulas) is a federal electoral district on Newfoundland Island in Newfoundland and Labrador, Canada, that has been represented in the House of Commons of Canada since 2015.

== Demographics ==
According to the 2011 National Household Survey, Bonavista—Burin—Trinity was the most Christian riding in Canada with 97% of the population claiming to have a Christian affiliation. It was also the only riding in Canada where less than 3% of the population had no religious affiliation.

According to the 2021 Canadian census

Ethnic groups: 96.8% White, 2.4% Indigenous
Languages: 99.1% English
Religions: 88.8% Christian (25.8% Anglican, 22.9% United Church, 20.3% Catholic, 11.2% Methodist, 4.1% Pentecostal), 10.8% No Religion
Median income: $31,600 (2020)
Average income: $39,840 (2020)

== Geography ==
The riding contains the Bonavista Bay area, the Burin Peninsula and the Trinity Bay area of Newfoundland.

== History ==
Bonavista—Burin—Trinity was created by the 2012 federal electoral boundaries redistribution and has been legally defined in the 2013 representation order. It came into effect upon the call of the 2015 Canadian federal election, held October 19, 2015. It was created out of parts of the electoral districts of Random—Burin—St. George's (41%), Bonavista—Gander—Grand Falls—Windsor (37%) and Avalon (22%).

In the 2015 election Judy Foote won the highest percentage of the vote out of any other Liberal candidate in the country. Over the next few elections the riding began to be more competitive, and in the 2025 election the riding was flipped by Conservative Jonathan Rowe.

Following the 2022 Canadian federal electoral redistribution, this riding was renamed Terra Nova—The Peninsulas, and gained the east coast of Placentia Bay from Avalon, while losing Salmon Cove to Avalon.

The riding's name was changed to The Eastern Peninsulas (French: Les Péninsules-Est) in 2026 as part of Bill C-25 of the 45th Canadian Parliament.

=== Members of Parliament ===
Parliament	Years	Member	Party
Bonavista—Burin—Trinity; Riding created from Random—Burin—St. George's, Bonavista—Gander—Grand Falls—Windsor and Avalon
42nd	2015–2017	Judy Foote	Liberal
42nd	2017–2019	Churence Rogers	Liberal
43rd	2019–2021	Churence Rogers	Liberal
44th	2021–2025	Churence Rogers	Liberal
Terra Nova—The Peninsulas
45th	2025–2026	Jonathan Rowe	Conservative
The Eastern Peninsulas
45th	2026–present	Jonathan Rowe	Conservative

== Election results ==
Graph of election results in Bonavista—Burin—Trinity (minor parties that never got 2% of the vote or didn't run consistently are omitted)

=== Terra Nova—The Peninsulas ===
2025 Canadian federal election: Terra Nova—The Peninsulas
Party	Candidate	Votes	%	±%	Expenditures
Conservative	Jonathan Rowe	19,605	47.73	+7.28	$101,953.74
Liberal	Anthony Germain	19,593	47.70	+0.44	$69,875.39
New Democratic	Liam Ryan	1,677	4.08	-4.25	$77.45
Total valid votes/expense limit		41,073	98.57	+0.19	$133,640.03
Total rejected ballots		597	1.43	–0.19	
Turnout		41,670	65.94		
Eligible voters		63,192			
Conservative notional gain from Liberal		Swing		+3.42	
Source: Elections Canada
Note: This riding's results were subject to an automatic judicial recount on May 9, 2025. Number of eligible voters does not include voting day registrations.

2021 federal election redistributed results
Party	Vote	%
Liberal	15,173	47.26
Conservative	12,986	40.45
New Democratic	2,673	8.33
People's	1,272	3.96

=== Bonavista—Burin—Trinity ===
==== 2021 ====
2021 Election Results by Polling Area

2021 Canadian federal election: Bonavista—Burin—Trinity
Party	Candidate	Votes	%	±%	Expenditures
Liberal	Churence Rogers	13,972	46.59	+0.88	$68,517.84
Conservative	Sharon Vokey	12,278	40.94	+1.48	$0.00
New Democratic	Anne Marie Anonsen	2,484	8.28	-3.70	$393.05
People's	Linda Hogan	1,257	4.19	–	$0.00
Total valid votes/expense limit		29,991	98.42		$110,716.47
Total rejected ballots		482	1.58	-0.28	
Turnout		30,473	51.12	-3.37	
Registered voters		59,605			
Liberal hold		Swing		-0.30	
Source: Elections Canada

==== 2019 ====
2019 Canadian federal election: Bonavista—Burin—Trinity
Party	Candidate	Votes	%	±%	Expenditures
Liberal	Churence Rogers	14,707	45.70	-23.52	$23,874.25
Conservative	Sharon Vokey	12,697	39.46	+16.65	none listed
New Democratic	Matthew Cooper	3,855	11.98	+7.25	$6.68
Green	Kelsey Reichel	920	2.86	+1.80	none listed
Total valid votes/expense limit		32,179	98.14	-1.42	107,548.45
Total rejected ballots		609	1.85	+1.43	
Turnout		32,788	55.83	+34.28	
Eligible voters		58,729			
Liberal hold		Swing		-20.09	
Source: Elections Canada

==== 2017 by-election ====
Canadian federal by-election, December 11, 2017: Bonavista—Burin—Trinity Resignation of Judy Foote
Party	Candidate	Votes	%	±%	Expenditures
Liberal	Churence Rogers	8,717	69.22	-12.58	
Conservative	Mike Windsor	2,878	22.85	+12.78	
New Democratic	Tyler James Downey	598	4.75	-2.54	
Libertarian	Shane Stapleton	262	2.08	N/A	
Green	Tyler Colbourne	138	1.10	+0.25	
Total valid votes/Expense limit		12,593	100.00		101,914.76
Total rejected ballots		54	0.42	+0.7	
Turnout		12,648	21.52	-35.83	
Eligible voters		58,771			
Liberal hold		Swing		-12.68	

==== 2015 ====
2015 Canadian federal election: Bonavista—Burin—Trinity
Party	Candidate	Votes	%	±%	Expenditures
Liberal	Judy M. Foote	28,704	81.80	+27.33	$40,957.22
Conservative	Mike Windsor	3,534	10.07	–20.43	$7,929.44
New Democratic	Jenn Brown	2,557	7.29	–6.66	$616.65
Green	Tyler John Colbourne	297	0.85	–0.03	–
Total valid votes/expense limit		35,092	100.00		$214,042.22
Total rejected ballots		173	0.49	–	
Turnout		35,265	57.36	–	
Eligible voters		61,475			
Liberal notional hold		Swing		+23.88	
Source: Elections Canada,

2011 federal election redistributed results
Party	Vote	%
Liberal	16,805	54.46
Conservative	9,412	30.50
New Democratic	4,303	13.95
Green	270	0.88
Others	66	0.21

== Student vote results ==
=== 2025 ===
2025 Canadian federal election
Party	Candidate	Votes	%
Conservative	Jonathan Rowe	1,400	52.81
Liberal	Anthony Germain	890	33.57
New Democratic	Liam Ryan	361	13.62
Total votes		2,651	100
Source: Student Vote Canada

=== 2021 ===
2021 Canadian federal election
Party	Candidate	Votes	%
New Democratic	Anne Marie Anonsen	624	32.77
Liberal	Churence Rogers	541	28.41
Conservative	Sharon Vokey	495	26.00
People's	Linda Hogan	244	12.84
Total votes		1,904	100
Source: Student Vote Canada

=== 2019 ===
2019 Canadian federal election
Party	Candidate	Votes	%	±%
New Democratic	Matthew Cooper	760	34.88	+21.13
Liberal	Churence Rogers	607	27.86	-37.65
Conservative	Sharon Vokey	446	20.47	+11
Green	Kelsey Reichel	366	16.8	+5.54
Total valid votes		2,179	100.0	–
Source: Student Vote Canada

=== 2015 ===
2015 Canadian federal election
Party	Candidate	Votes	%
Liberal	Judy M. Foote	948	65.51
New Democratic	Jenn Brown	199	13.75
Green	Tyler John Colbourne	163	11.26
Conservative	Mike Windsor	137	9.47
Total valid votes		1,447	100.0
Source: Student Vote Canada

== See also ==
- List of Canadian electoral districts
- Historical federal electoral districts of Canada
