= Battlefords—Lloydminster—Meadow Lake =

Federal electoral district in Saskatchewan, Canada

Saskatchewan electoral district
- Interactive map of riding boundaries from the 2025 federal election. Points indicate the cities of North Battleford, Lloydminster, and Meadow Lake.
- Coordinates: 53.128°N 109.027°W

Federal electoral district
- Legislature: House of Commons
MP
Rosemarie Falk
Conservative
- District created: 1996
- First contested: 1997
- Last contested: 2025
- District webpage: profile, map

Demographics
- Population (2021): 70,918
- Electors (2015): 48,638
- Area (km²): 29,491.82
- Pop. density (per km²): 2.4
- Census division(s): Division No. 12, Division No. 13, Division No. 16, Division No. 17
- Census subdivision(s): Lloydminster (part), North Battleford, Meadow Lake, Battleford, Meadow Lake, Unity, Seekaskootch, Britannia, Mervin, Wilton

Battlefords—Lloydminster—Meadow Lake (formerly Battlefords—Lloydminster) is a federal electoral district in Saskatchewan, Canada, that has been represented in the House of Commons of Canada since 1997.

Following the 2022 Canadian federal electoral redistribution, this riding will be renamed Battlefords—Lloydminster—Meadow Lake at the first election held after April 22, 2024. It will gain Beaver Lake, Spiritwood, Meadow Lake, Loon Lake and the remainder of the Medstead Rural Municipalities, including enclosed Indian Reserves, Villages and the City of Meadow Lake from Desnethé—Missinippi—Churchill River; lose the Rural Municipalities of Eye Hill, Grass Lake, Tramping Lake, Reford, Rosemount, Heart's Hill, Progress, Mariposa, Grandview, Antelope Park, Prairiedale, Oakdale, Winslow and all enclosed towns and villages in those RMs to Swift Current—Grasslands—Kindersley.

== Geography ==
The district is in Central-Western Saskatchewan. It includes the communities of North Battleford, Battleford and Unity; as well as the Saskatchewan portion of Lloydminster.

== Demographics ==
Panethnic groups in Battlefords—Lloydminster (2011−2021)
Panethnic group	2021		2016		2011	
Panethnic group	Pop.	%	Pop.	%	Pop.	%
European (Note: Statistic includes all persons that did not make up part of a visible minority or an indigenous identity.)	46,095	66.69%	49,280	68.78%	51,620	75.17%
Indigenous	17,115	24.76%	17,250	24.08%	14,910	21.71%
Southeast Asian (Note: Statistic includes total responses of "Filipino" and "Southeast Asian" under visible minority section on census.)	3,655	5.29%	3,125	4.36%	1,115	1.62%
South Asian	865	1.25%	840	1.17%	325	0.47%
African	515	0.75%	340	0.47%	210	0.31%
East Asian (Note: Statistic includes total responses of "Chinese", "Korean", and "Japanese" under visible minority section on census.)	400	0.58%	425	0.59%	280	0.41%
Latin American	285	0.41%	155	0.22%	140	0.2%
Middle Eastern (Note: Statistic includes total responses of "West Asian" and "Arab" under visible minority section on census.)	40	0.06%	75	0.1%	0	0%
Other/multiracial (Note: Statistic includes total responses of "Visible minority, n.i.e." and "Multiple visible minorities" under visible minority section on census.)	165	0.24%	170	0.24%	60	0.09%
Total responses	69,120	97.46%	71,645	97.47%	68,675	98.06%
Total population	70,918	100%	73,506	100%	70,034	100%
Notes: Totals greater than 100% due to multiple origin responses. Demographics based on 2012 Canadian federal electoral redistribution riding boundaries.

According to the 2011 Canadian census

Languages: 87.4% English, 4.5% Cree, 2.5% German, 1.4% French, 1.0% Tagalog, 3.2% Other
Religions: 71.4% Christian, 3.6% Traditional (Aboriginal) Spirituality, 0.8% Other, 24.2% None
Median income: $29,976 (2010)
Average income: $37,724 (2010)

== History ==
The electoral district was created in 1996 from Kindersley—Lloydminster and The Battlefords—Meadow Lake ridings.

This riding lost territory to Cypress Hills—Grasslands and gained a fraction of territory from Saskatoon—Rosetown—Biggar during the 2012 electoral redistribution.

=== Historical boundaries ===
1996 representation order

2013 representation order

2023 final report

== Members of Parliament ==
The riding has been represented by Rosemarie Falk since 2017. It has elected the following members of the House of Commons of Canada:

Parliament	Years	Member	Party
Battlefords—Lloydminster; Riding created from Kindersley—Lloydminster and The Battlefords—Meadow Lake
36th	1997–2000	Gerry Ritz	Reform
36th	2000–2000	Gerry Ritz	Alliance
37th	2000–2003	Gerry Ritz	Alliance
37th	2003–2004	Gerry Ritz	Conservative
38th	2004–2006	Gerry Ritz	Conservative
39th	2006–2008	Gerry Ritz	Conservative
40th	2008–2011	Gerry Ritz	Conservative
41st	2011–2015	Gerry Ritz	Conservative
42nd	2015–2017	Gerry Ritz	Conservative
42nd	2017–2019	Rosemarie Falk	Conservative
43rd	2019–2021	Rosemarie Falk	Conservative
44th	2021–2025	Rosemarie Falk	Conservative
Battlefords—Lloydminster—Meadow Lake
45th	2025–present	Rosemarie Falk	Conservative

== Election results ==
Graph of election results Battlefords—Lloydminster (minor parties that never got 2% of the vote or didn't run consistently are omitted) View source data.

2025 Canadian federal election
** Preliminary results — Not yet official **
Party	Candidate	Votes	%	±%	Expenditures
Conservative	Rosemarie Falk	28,634	75.8	+7.10	
Liberal	Larry Ingram	7,073	18.7	+13.1	
Canadian Future	Darrell Patan	264	0.7	n/a	
New Democratic	William Petryk	1,816	4.8	-7.2	
Total valid votes/expense limit		37787			
Total rejected ballots		290			
Turnout		38,077	63.40		
Eligible voters		60,057			
Source: Elections Canada

2021 federal election redistributed results
Party	Vote	%
Conservative	23,018	67.26
New Democratic	4,418	12.91
Liberal	2,506	7.32
People's	2,050	5.99
Green	266	0.78
Others	1,965	5.74

2021 Canadian federal election: Battlefords—Lloydminster
Party	Candidate	Votes	%	±%	Expenditures
Conservative	Rosemarie Falk	21,336	68.7	-9.6	$59,048.66
New Democratic	Erik Hansen	3,718	12.0	+0.6	$12,928.01
Maverick	Ken Rutherford	2,162	7.0	–	$21,013.54
People's	Terry Sieben	1,847	5.9	+4.2	$0.00
Liberal	Larry Ingram	1,748	5.6	-1.2	$5,713.77
Green	Kerri Wall	237	0.8	-0.9	$0.00
Total valid votes/expense limit		31,048	99.4	+0.2	$112,669.55
Total rejected ballots		182	0.6	-0.2	
Turnout		31,230	61.88	-8.82	
Eligible voters		50,641			
Conservative hold		Swing		-5.1	
Source: Elections Canada

2019 Canadian federal election: Battlefords—Lloydminster
Party	Candidate	Votes	%	±%	Expenditures
Conservative	Rosemarie Falk	28,030	78.3	+8.74	$35,922.24
New Democratic	Marcella Pedersen	4,098	11.4	-1.77	$7,794.87
Liberal	Larry Ingram	2,426	6.8	-3.64	none listed
People's	Jason MacInnis	662	1.8	–	none listed
Green	David Kim-Cragg	605	1.7	+.15	$0.00
Total valid votes/expense limit		35,821	100.0		
Total rejected ballots		278			
Turnout		36,099	70.7		
Eligible voters		51,033			
Conservative hold		Swing		+5.26	
Source: Elections Canada

On 5 November 2017, Prime Minister Justin Trudeau announced a by-election will be held on December 11, 2017.

Canadian federal by-election, 11 December 2017 Resignation of Gerry Ritz
Party	Candidate	Votes	%	±%
Conservative	Rosemarie Falk	8,965	69.56	+8.55
New Democratic	Matt Fedler	1,698	13.17	-4.44
Liberal	Larry Ingram	1,345	10.44	-6.04
Independent	Ken Finlayson	681	5.28	–
Green	Yvonne Potter-Pihach	200	1.55	-0.16
Total valid votes/Expense limit		12,889	100.00	
Total rejected ballots				
Turnout		12,889	27.05	-39.46
Eligible voters		47,651		
Conservative hold		Swing		+6.49

2015 Canadian federal election: Battlefords—Lloydminster
Party	Candidate	Votes	%	±%	Expenditures
Conservative	Gerry Ritz	20,547	61.01	-4.94	$70,973.30
New Democratic	Glenn Tait	5,930	17.61	-10.45	$6,284.73
Liberal	Larry Ingram	5,550	16.48	+13.10	$17,912.01
Independent	Doug Anguish	1,076	3.19	n/a	–
Green	Mikaela Tenkink	575	1.71	-0.90	$56.97
Total valid votes/expense limit		33,678	99.45		$214,778.83
Total rejected ballots		186	0.55	–	
Turnout		33,864	66.51	–	
Eligible voters		50,917			
Conservative hold		Swing		+2.76	
Source: Elections Canada

2011 federal election redistributed results
Party	Vote	%
Conservative	17,168	65.95
New Democratic	7,304	28.06
Liberal	881	3.38
Green	680	2.61

2011 Canadian federal election: Battlefords—Lloydminster
Party	Candidate	Votes	%	±%	Expenditures
Conservative	(x) Gerry Ritz	19,203	66.9	+6.8	$57,125
New Democratic	Glenn Tait	7,767	27.1	+1.8	$57,552
Liberal	Jordan LaPlante	950	3.3	-4.9	$4,043
Green	Norbert Kratchmer	785	2.7	-2.3	$345
Total valid votes/expense limit		28,705	100.0		–
Total rejected ballots		109	0.4	0.0	
Turnout		28,814	58.2	+7	
Eligible voters		49,530	–	–	

2008 Canadian federal election: Battlefords—Lloydminster
Party	Candidate	Votes	%	±%	Expenditures
Conservative	(x) Gerry Ritz	15,621	60.1	+6.1	$60,942
New Democratic	Bob Woloshyn	6,572	25.3	+9.6	$52,759
Liberal	Greg Nyholt	2,140	8.2	-4.6	–
Green	Norbert Kratchmer	1,287	5.0	+2.9	$4,638
Christian Heritage	Harold Stephan	368	1.4	+0.4	$6
Total valid votes/expense limit		25,988	100.0		$87,340
Total rejected ballots		96	0.4	+0.1	
Turnout		26,084	51	-9	

2006 Canadian federal election: Battlefords—Lloydminster
Party	Candidate	Votes	%	±%	Expenditures
Conservative	(x) Gerry Ritz	16,491	54.1	-4.2	$54,526
New Democratic	Elgin Wyatt	4,829	15.7	-4.6	$20,468
Independent	Jim Pankiw	4,396	14.4	–	$77,133
Liberal	Dominic LaPlante	3,901	12.8	-4.6	–
Green	Norbert Kratchmer	637	2.1	-0.8	$145
Christian Heritage	Harold Stephan	306	1.0	-0.2	$562
Total valid votes		30,560	100.0		–
Total rejected ballots		89	0.3	-0.1	
Turnout		30,649	60	+8	

2004 Canadian federal election: Battlefords—Lloydminster
Party	Candidate	Votes	%	±%	Expenditures
Conservative	(x) Gerry Ritz	15,441	58.3	-7.0	$45,813
New Democratic	Shawn McKee	5,367	20.2	+2.9	$41,961
Liberal	Del Price	4,617	17.4	+0.1	$32,265
Green	Kelsey Pearson	766	2.9	–	
Christian Heritage	Diane Stephan	316	1.2	–	
Total valid votes		26,507	100.0		–
Total rejected ballots		94	0.4		
Turnout		26,601	52	-8.3	

2000 Canadian federal election: Battlefords—Lloydminster
Party	Candidate	Votes	%	±%	Expenditures
Alliance	(x) Gerry Ritz	17,691	60.2	+17.5	$43,761
New Democratic	Elgin Wayne Wyatt	5,107	17.4	-10.4	$22,558
Liberal	Peter Frey	5,098	17.4	-2.7	$15,510
Progressive Conservative	Harry Zamonsky	1,474	5.0	-4.4	$3,102
Total valid votes		29,370	100.0		–
Total rejected ballots		107	0.4		
Turnout		29,477	60	-3.3	

1997 Canadian federal election: Battlefords—Lloydminster
Party	Candidate	Votes	%	±%	Expenditures
Reform	Gerry Ritz	13,125	42.7	–	$37,206
New Democratic	(x) Len Taylor	8,535	27.8	–	$49,152
Liberal	Glenn Hornick	6,155	20.0	–	$43,136
Progressive Conservative	Ken Ritter	2,888	9.4	–	$22,635
Total valid votes		30,703	100.0		–
Total rejected ballots		91	0.3		
Turnout		30,794	63		

== See also ==
- List of Canadian electoral districts
- Historical federal electoral districts of Canada
