= Public Health Institute of Chile =

Governmental medical organization in Santiago, Chile

- Instituto de Salud Pública de Chile
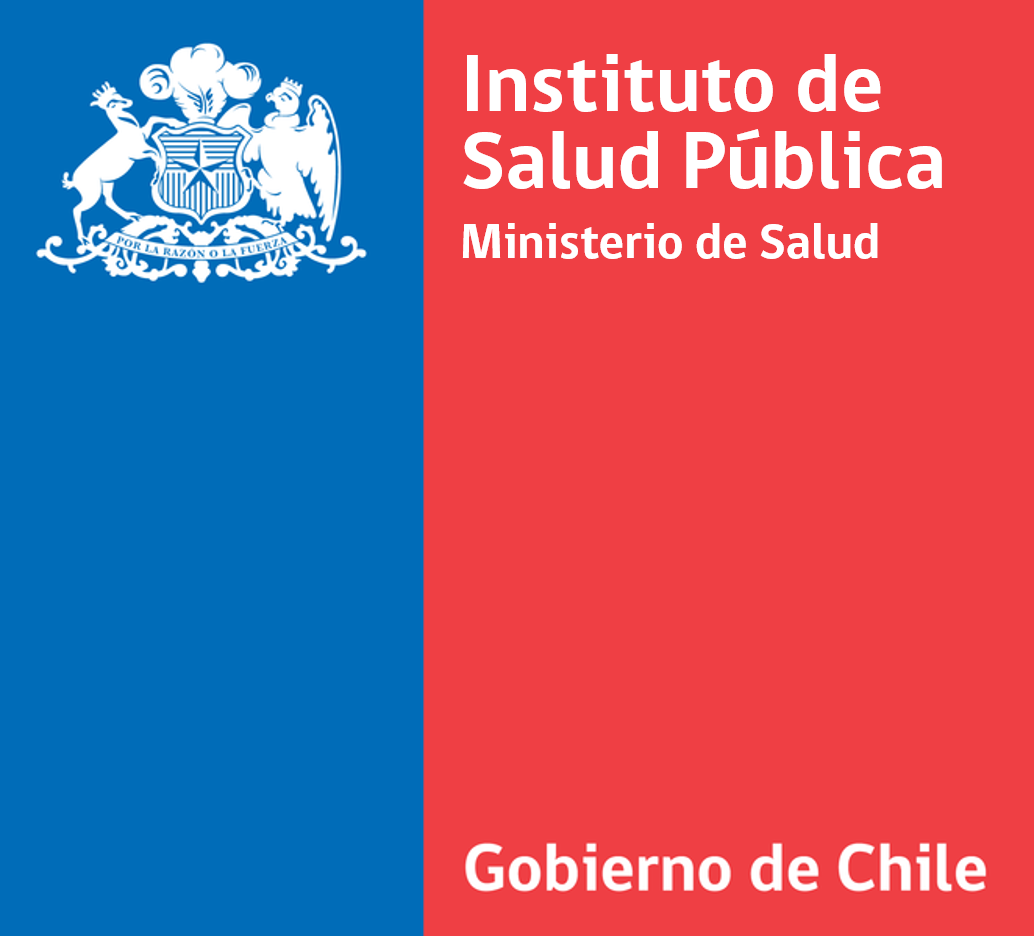

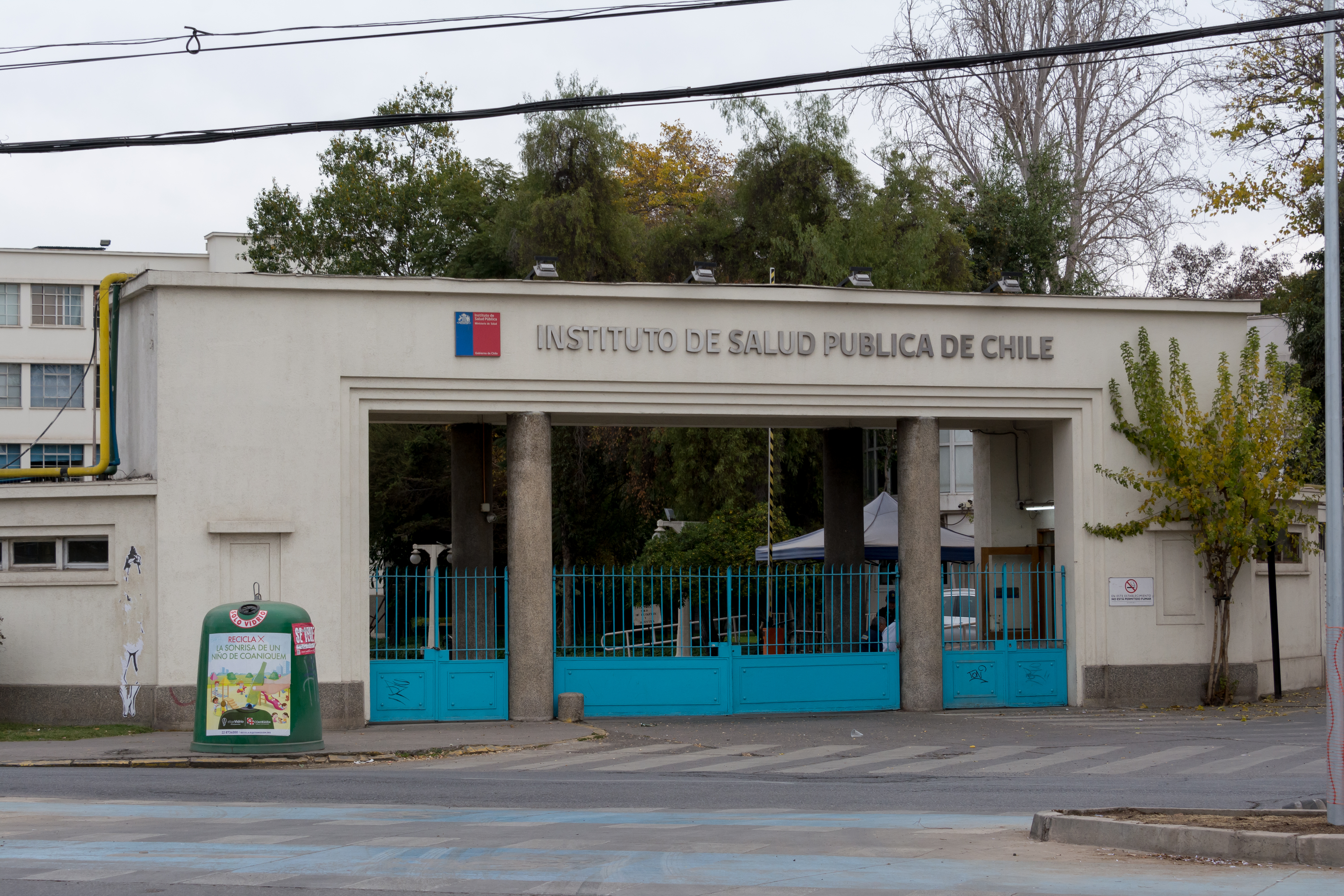
- Abbreviation: ISP
- Headquarters: Av. Marathon 1000, Ñuñoa, Santiago de Chile
- Director: Rubén Verdugo Castillo
- Parent organization: Ministry of Health (Chile)
- Website: https://www.ispch.cl/

The Public Health Institute of Chile (ISP) is a public organization that promotes and protects public health in Chile. Since 2019, the ISP has been a member of Vaccine Safety Net (VSN), a global network of websites established by the World Health Organization (WHO).
