= Liberal Party of Newfoundland and Labrador leadership elections =

This page lists the results of leadership elections held by the Liberal Party of Newfoundland and Labrador.

== 1949 leadership convention ==
(Held April 28, 1949)

- Joey Smallwood acclaimed

== 1969 leadership convention ==
(Held November 1, 1969)

- Joey Smallwood 1070
- John Crosbie 440
- Alexander Hickman 187
- Randolph Joyce 13
- Peter Cook 3
- Vincent Spencer 1

== 1972 leadership convention ==
(Held February 5, 1972)

- Edward Roberts 564
- Tom Burgess 82
- Rod Moores 14
- Vincent Spencer 3

== 1974 leadership convention ==
(Held October 26, 1974)

First Ballot:

- Edward Roberts 337
- Joey Smallwood 305
- Roger Simmons 57
- Steve Neary 24

Second Ballot (Neary eliminated):

- Edward Roberts 403
- Joey Smallwood 298
- Roger Simmons 7

== 1977 leadership convention ==
(Held October 14–15, 1977)

First Ballot:

- Edward Roberts 356
- Steve Neary 238
- Bill Rowe 159
- Roger Simmons 115
- Hugh Shea 2

Second Ballot (Shea eliminated):

- Edward Roberts 378
- Steve Neary 220
- Bill Rowe 150
- Roger Simmons 100

Third Ballot (Simmons eliminated):

- Edward Roberts 373
- Bill Rowe 227
- Steve Neary 215

Fourth Ballot (Neary eliminated):

- Bill Rowe 439
- Edward Roberts 376

== 1979 leadership election ==
Following Rowe's resignation on May 27, 1979 the Party Executive elected Don Jamieson leader.

== 1980 leadership convention ==
(Held November 1, 1980)

- Len Stirling 666
- Les Thoms 140
- Ted Noseworthy 1

Stirling was personally defeated in the 1982 general election. On October 16, 1982 Steve Neary was named interim leader.

== 1984 leadership convention ==
(Held October 13, 1984)

- Leo Barry 517
- Eugene Hiscock 51
- Hugh Shea 24

== 1987 leadership convention ==
(Held June 5, 1987)

- Clyde Wells 564
- Winston Baker 67
- Ted Noseworthy 10

== 1996 leadership convention ==
(Held January 17, 1996)

- Brian Tobin acclaimed

Tobin resigned as premier and leader on October 16, 2000. Beaton Tulk was chosen interim leader and premier.

== 2001 leadership convention ==
(Held February 3, 2001)

First Ballot:

- Roger Grimes 609
- John Efford 546
- Paul Dicks 111

Second Ballot (Dicks eliminated):

- Roger Grimes 638
- John Efford 624

Grimes resigned on May 30, 2005 and Gerry Reid was named interim leader.

== 2006 leadership convention ==
(Held February 6, 2006)

- Jim Bennett acclaimed

Bennett resigned as leader on May 8, 2006. Gerry Reid once again became interim leader and was elected by the executive as permanent leader on May 29, 2006. Reid was personally defeated in the 2007 General Election and resigned. Yvonne Jones was named interim leader on November 15, 2007.

== May 2011 leadership convention ==
(Held May 28, 2011)

- Yvonne Jones acclaimed

Jones resigned on August 9, 2011. The Party Executive elected a successor on August 14.

== August 2011 leadership election ==
(Held August 14, 2011 - secret ballot by party executive, vote totals not released)

- Kevin Aylward elected
- Brad Cabana
- Bern Coffey
- Danny Dumaresque
- Ryan Lane
- Rodney Martin
- Charles Murphy

Aylward was defeated in the 2011 general election and resigned effective January 3, 2012. Dwight Ball was chosen interim leader.

== 2013 leadership convention ==
(Held November 15–17, 2013)

Results
	Ballot 1				Ballot 2				Ballot 3			
Candidate	Votes	%	Points	%	Votes	%	Points	%	Votes	%	Points	%
Dwight Ball	10,944	45.94%	2,130.05	44.38%	11,306	48.45%	2,257.15	47.02%	12,598	60.64%	2,832.29	59.01%
Paul Antle	6,340	26.61%	1,321.15	27.52%	6,600	28.28%	1,397.86	29.12%	8,178	39.36%	1,967.71	40.99%
Cathy Bennett	5,252	22.05%	1,089.05	22.69%	5,431	23.27%	1,144.99	23.85%				
Danny Dumaresque	670	2.81%	131.69	2.74%								
Jim Bennett	617	2.59%	128.05	2.67%								
Total	23,823	100.00	4,800.00	100.00	23,337	100.00	4,800.00	100.00	20,776	100.00	4,800.00	100.00

= Winner

== 2020 leadership convention ==
(Held August 3, 2020) after Dwight Ball announced his pending resignation in February 2020. A virtual convention was held on August 3, 2020, at which Andrew Furey was elected leader.

Point allocation by ballot
Candidate	Ballot 1
Name	Points
Andrew Furey	26,443; 66.11%
John Abbott	13,557; 33.89%
Total points	40,000.00

== 2025 leadership convention ==
(Held on May 2–3, 2025) Was triggered by the resignation of Liberal Premier Andrew Furey, who announced on February 25, 2025, that he would be stepping down after nearly five years in office.

Results
Candidate	First ballot
Name	Percentage
John Hogan	77.48%
John Abbott	22.52%
Total	9,895 votes cast

== See also ==
- Leadership convention
- Liberal Party of Newfoundland and Labrador
