= August 2011 Liberal Party of Newfoundland and Labrador leadership election =

- Date: August 14, 2011
- Resigning leader: Yvonne Jones
- Won by: Kevin Aylward
- Ballots: 1
- Candidates: 7
- Entrance fee: $500

The Liberal Party of Newfoundland and Labrador leadership election, August 2011 was prompted by Yvonne Jones' announcement that she would be stepping down as Liberal leader, once her successor was chosen, for health reasons. Her announcement came 62 days before the October 2011 provincial election.

Former Member of the House of Assembly (MHA) and cabinet minister Kevin Aylward was chosen as the Liberal leader on August 14, 2011.

== Timing ==
Jones served as the interim party leader following the 2007 provincial election, and was sworn in as party leader on May 28, 2011. Jones had been acclaimed leader after being the only candidate to file nomination papers for the leadership in July 2010. On August 16, 2010, she announced she had breast cancer and would be taking a leave of absence for treatment, but would vowed to return and fight the election. Jones returned to the House of Assembly for the Spring sitting and had already started making policy announcements for the election when she announced her resignation. Jones held a news conference on August 9, 2011, where she announced her resignation stating that her white blood cell count had not recovered and her immune system was too weak to fight an election as leader, though she would seek re-election in her district.

== Process of selecting leader ==
Due to the timing of Jones' resignation, less than 6 weeks before the writ for the election was set to drop, the Liberal executive met on the night of her resignation to come up with a process of selecting a leader as soon as possible. Nominations for the leadership opened at noon on August 10, and closed on August 12, at noon. Candidates submitted a non-refundable $500 fee in addition to a letter to party president Judy Morrow expressing their interest in the leadership. The party executive engaged in a 48-hour consultation process, that reached out to party members throughout the province. On the afternoon of August 14, the candidates were allowed half an hour to address the executive board. The 19 members of the executive board voted by secret ballot to determine the successful leadership candidate, and Aylward won on the first ballot.

== Declared candidates ==
=== Kevin Aylward ===
Former MHA for St. George's-Stephenville East (1985–2003) and cabinet minister.

Support from caucus members:
Support from outside caucus:
Date campaign launched: August 12, 2011.
Policies:

=== Brad Cabana ===
Businessman and blogger, who attempted to run for the Progressive Conservative Party leadership earlier in the year.

Support from caucus members:
Support from outside caucus:
Date campaign launched: August 10, 2011.
Policies:Get rid of the Muskrat Falls deal and get the province's debt under control.

=== Bern Coffey ===
St. John's lawyer.

Support from caucus members:
Support from outside caucus:
Date campaign launched: August 11, 2010.
Policies:Get rid of the current Muskrat Falls deal and sustain government spending.

=== Danny Dumaresque ===
Former MHA for Eagle River (1989–1996) and former party president.

Support from caucus members:
Support from outside caucus:
Date campaign launched: August 10, 2011.
Policies:Get rid of the Muskrat Falls deal, and focus on the fishing industry.

=== Ryan Lane ===
Consultant, former teacher and candidate in Terra Nova.

Support from caucus members:
Support from outside caucus:
Date campaign launched: August 12, 2011.
Policies:

=== Rodney Martin ===
Real-estate agent.

Support from caucus members:
Support from outside caucus:
Date campaign launched: August 12, 2011.
Policies:

=== Charles Murphy ===
Former New Democratic Party of Newfoundland and Labrador candidate in Bay of Islands.

Support from caucus members:
Support from outside caucus:
Date campaign launched: August 12, 2011.
Policies:

== Potential candidates who did not run ==
- Paul Antle, businessman, Liberal Party of Canada candidate in St. John's East in 2006.
- Siobhan Coady, former Liberal Member of Parliament for St. John's South—Mount Pearl (2008–2011).
- Marshall Dean, Current MHA for The Straits - White Bay North.
- Chuck Furey, former MHA for St. Barbe (1985–2000) and cabinet minister.
- Rick Hillier, former Chief of the Defence Staff of the Canadian Forces.
- Dean MacDonald, businessman and former chair of Newfoundland and Labrador Hydro.
- Lloyd Matthews, former MHA for St. John's North (1993–2003) and cabinet minister.
- John Noseworthy, former Auditor General of Newfoundland and Labrador.
- Randy Simms, mayor of Mount Pearl and host of VOCM-AM's Open Line.
- Mark Watton, former candidate, Humber West

== Timeline ==
- August 9, 2011: Yvonne Jones announces she will step down as leader due to her health.
- August 9, 2011: The Liberal Party executive meet to finalize plans to choose the next leader.
- August 10, 2011: Danny Dumaresque and Brad Cabana announce their candidacy for the leadership.
- August 11, 2011: Bern Coffey announces his candidacy.
- August 12, 2011: Kevin Aylward, Ryan Lane, Rodney Martin and Charles Murphy all announce their candidacy.
- August 14, 2011: Kevin Aylward wins the Liberal leadership election.
