= Joan Shea =

Canadian politician

The Honourable Joan Shea ECNL

Member of the Newfoundland and Labrador House of Assembly for St. George's-Stephenville East
- In office October 2003 – June 2, 2014
- Preceded by: Kevin Aylward
- Succeeded by: Scott Reid

Minister of Advanced Education and Skills and Minister Responsible for Persons with Disabilities and Youth Engagement of Newfoundland and Labrador
- In office October 28, 2011 – October 9, 2013
- Preceded by: New office
- Succeeded by: Kevin O'Brien

Government House Leader in the Newfoundland and Labrador House of Assembly
- In office May 2008 – June 3, 2014
- Preceded by: Tom Rideout
- Succeeded by: Jerome Kennedy

Minister of Education, Deputy Government House Leader, Minister of Environment and Conservation, Minister Responsible for the Multi-Materials Stewardship Board, And Minister Responsible for the Office of Climate Change, Energy Efficiency And Emissions Trading of Newfoundland and Labrador
- In office January 11, 2011 – October 28, 2011
- Preceded by: Darin King
- Succeeded by: Clyde Jackman
- In office November 8, 2005 – April 9, 2009
- Preceded by: Darin King
- Succeeded by: Clyde Jackman

Minister of Child, Youth, & Family Services, Minister Responsible for the status of persons with Disabilities, And Minister Responsible for Workplace Health, Safety and Compensation Commission of Newfoundland and Labrador
- In office April 9, 2009 – January 13, 2011
- Preceded by: New office
- Succeeded by: Charlene Johnson

Minister of Human Resources & Employment, Minister Responsible for the Status of Women of Newfoundland and Minister Responsible for the NL Housing Corporation MinisterLabrador
- In office November 6, 2003 – November 8, 2005
- Succeeded by: Paul Shelley

Personal details
- Born: Bishop's Falls, Newfoundland and Labrador
- Party: Progressive Conservatives
- Occupation: Parole officer Social worker

Joan Shea (previously Burke) is a former Canadian politician and Cabinet minister in Newfoundland and Labrador. From 2003 to 2014 Shea served as the member of the House of Assembly (MHA) for the district of St. George's-Stephenville East. Shea was the first person holding a BSW to serve in the NL legislature. Shea was also the first woman to serve as Government House Leader in the province's history.

During her entire career as a MHA, Shea served as a minister in the Cabinets of Danny Williams, Kathy Dunderdale and Tom Marshall. Shea held the posts of Minister of Education, Minister of Advanced Education and Skills, Minister of Human Resources, Labour and Employment, Minister of Child, Youth and Family Services and Minister Responsible for the Status of Women. During her political career, Shea was also responsible for Newfoundland and Labrador Housing, the Labour Relations Agency, and Workplace Health and Safety Commission.

As Minister, Shea was instrumental in the establishment of the newly created Department of Child, Youth and Family Services and also led the development of the Department of Advanced Education and Skills.

Before entering politics she worked as a Parole Officer with the Correctional Service of Canada in Ontario and Newfoundland. Shea holds a BSW from Memorial University and an MSW from the University of Toronto.

== Politics ==
Shea was elected to politics in the 2003 provincial election as a member of the Progressive Conservative Party. Following the election she was sworn into Cabinet as the Minister of Human Resources and Employment and as the Minister Responsible for the Status of Women. In 2005, Premier Danny Williams appointed Shea as the Minister of Education.

In the 2007 general election Shea was re-elected with 75% of the vote, up from 53% in 2003. Shea remained as Minister of Education following the election and in May 2008 was also named Government House Leader, becoming the first woman appointed to this position in the history of the province.

In April 2009, Shea was appointed Minister of the newly created Department of Child, Youth, and Family Services. She became the acting minister of Human Resources, Labour and Employment in December 2010, and the following month she was re-appointed as Minister of Education.

Shea had been mentioned as a possible contender for leader of the Progressive Conservatives and though following the resignation of Premier Williams in 2010 it was thought that Shea may try to succeed him, ultimately she did not.

Following the 2011 provincial election, Shea was appointed the Minister of the newly created Department of Advanced Education and Skills, which combines the post-secondary education component of the Department of Education and most of the former Department of Human Resources, Labour and Employment. She resigned from politics on June 2, 2014.

== Electoral record ==
2011 Newfoundland and Labrador general election
Party	Candidate	Votes	%	±%
Progressive Conservative	Joan Burke	2,104	49.29%	–
Liberal	Kevin Aylward	1,397	32.72%	
NDP	Bernice Hancock	705	16.51%	
Independent	Dean Simon	63	1.48%	

St. George's-Stephenville East - 2007 Newfoundland and Labrador general election
Party	Candidate	Votes	%	±%
Progressive Conservative	Joan Burke	3,143	74.74%	–
Liberal	George Lee	1,062	25.26%	

St. George's-Stephenville East - 2003 Newfoundland and Labrador general election
Party	Candidate	Votes	%	±%
Progressive Conservative	Joan Burke	2,927	52.63%	–
Liberal	Ron Dawe	2,464	44.31%	
Independent	Nancy Critchley	170	3.06%	
