= Kevin Aylward =

Canadian businessman and politician

The Honourable Kevin Aylward ECNL
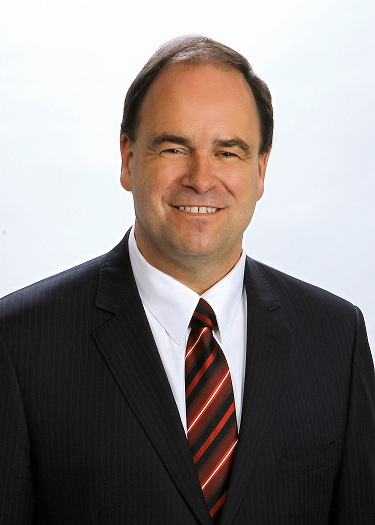

Leader of the Liberal Party of Newfoundland and Labrador
- In office August 14, 2011 – January 3, 2012
- Preceded by: Yvonne Jones
- Succeeded by: Dwight Ball (interim)

Member of the Newfoundland and Labrador House of Assembly for St. George's-Stephenville East
- In office 1985–2003
- Preceded by: Fred Stagg
- Succeeded by: Joan Burke

Personal details
- Born: August 24, 1960 (age 66) Stephenville Crossing, Newfoundland and Labrador, Canada
- Party: Liberal
- Cabinet: Minister of Environment (1994-1996) (2002-2003) Minister of Environment and Labour (1996-1997); Minister of Forest Resources and Agrifoods (1997-2001) Minister of Tourism, Culture and Recreation (2001-2002)

Kevin Aylward (born August 24, 1960) is a Canadian businessman and former politician in Newfoundland and Labrador, Canada. He was the leader of the Liberal Party of Newfoundland and Labrador from August 14, 2011, until January 3, 2012. Aylward was first elected to the Newfoundland and Labrador House of Assembly in the 1985 election and served as a cabinet minister in the governments of Clyde Wells, Brian Tobin, Beaton Tulk and Roger Grimes. Aylward did not seek re-election in the 2003 election.

Upon the resignation of Liberal leader Yvonne Jones on August 9, 2011, 62 days before the provincial election, Aylward ran in the leadership race to succeed her. Five days after Jones' resignation Aylward was chosen as party leader in a field of seven candidates. On October 26, 2011, he resigned as leader after failing to win the district of St. George's-Stephenville East in the 2011 provincial election.

Aylward is a member of the Qalipu Mi'kmaq First Nation Band.

== Political career ==
Born in 1960 in Stephenville Crossing, Newfoundland and Labrador, Aylward was 24 years old when first elected as a Member of the House of Assembly (MHA) in the 1985 provincial election. He held several cabinet portfolios in the 1990s and early 2000s, including Environment and Labour, Forest Resources and Agrifoods, Tourism, Culture and Recreation, and Environment.

Aylward did not seek re-election in the 2003 provincial election.

=== Environment Minister ===
Aylward held the Environment portfolio and four other portfolios . He was sworn into cabinet in 1994 as Minister of the Environment in the Clyde Wells government, and in 1996 Premier Brian Tobin appointed him the Minister of Environment and Labour. After holding several other portfolios between 1997 and 2002, he was once again sworn in as Environment Minister under Premier Roger Grimes.

=== Leader ===
On August 12, 2011, Aylward announced his bid for the leadership of Liberal Party of Newfoundland and Labrador. On August 14, the executives of the party chose Aylward as leader of the party, over six other candidates, citing his experience as a former MHA and cabinet minister as a key reason for selecting him.

In the October election the Progressive Conservatives won their third straight majority. While the Liberals managed to remain the Official Opposition, they placed third in the popular vote winning only 19.1 per cent. On October 26, 2011, Aylward announced his resignation as leader after failing to win the district of St. George's-Stephenville East.

=== Attempted comeback ===
In 2021, Aylward unsuccessfully ran in Stephenville-Port au Port as the Liberal candidate for the 2021 provincial election.
