= Tom Burgess (Newfoundland politician) =

Irish-Canadian politician

Thomas William Burgess (born August 21, 1933) is an Irish-born former Newfoundland and Labrador politician. He represented Labrador West from 1966 to 1972 in the Newfoundland House of Assembly.

The son of John Burgess, he was born in Bray, County Wicklow and was educated at the Catholic University School and St. Mary's School in Dublin. He worked in construction and various other occupations in England, Wales, Africa, Australia and New Zealand before becoming a Canadian resident in 1958. He came to Labrador City with the Iron Ore Company of Canada, joining the United Steelworkers of America in 1960.

Burgess married Rhyna McLean; the couple had one daughter.

In 1966, he was elected to the Newfoundland assembly as a Liberal. In 1969, he joined the New Labrador Party. Following the 1971 election, the number of seats held by the Liberals and Conservatives was very close and Burgess held the balance of power. He declared that he would support the Conservatives. However, when Frank Moores failed to give him a seat in the cabinet, Burgess returned to the Liberal Party. He ran unsuccessfully for the Liberal party leadership in 1972. Burgess was defeated when he ran for reelection in 1972 and retired from politics, leaving the province afterwards.

Burgess Avenue in Mount Pearl, NL is named after him.
