= Chris Decker =

Canadian politician

MHA for The Straits – White Bay North
- In office 1985–1999
- Preceded by: Ed Roberts
- Succeeded by: Brian Tobin

Personal details
- Born: November 17, 1941 St. Anthony, Newfoundland and Labrador
- Died: August 8, 2015 (aged 73) Newfoundland and Labrador
- Party: Liberal Party of Newfoundland and Labrador
- Occupation: Businessman

Christopher Robert Decker (November 17, 1941 – August 8, 2015) was an English United Church clergyman, businessman and politician in Newfoundland and Labrador. He represented The Straits – White Bay North in the Newfoundland House of Assembly from 1985 to 1999.

The son of Alan Decker and Leah Simms, he was born in St. Anthony and grew up in Roddickton. He attended high school in Roddickton and Prince Of Wales College and went on to receive a BA from Memorial University and a Master of Divinity from Pine Hill Divinity Hall in Halifax, Nova Scotia. Decker served as a minister in various places in Canada. In 1967, he married Patricia Roberts. In 1972, Decker returned to Roddickton, where he operated several businesses and served two terms as mayor. He served as member and chair for the Strait of Belle Isle Integrated School Board and for the Vinland Integrated School Board. He also served on the Integrated Education Council for Newfoundland and Labrador. Decker was a member of the board of regents for Memorial University and served as chair from 2002 to 2003.

Decker was elected to the Newfoundland assembly in 1985; he was reelected in 1989, 1993 and 1996. He served in the provincial cabinet as Minister of Health, as Minister of Justice and Attorney General and as Minister of Education.

After leaving politics in 1999, he worked as a consultant. Decker also published three books:

- Gravel Pit Campers (2010)
- Dissolution (2012)
- By Right of Soil (2011)

Decker died of cancer at the age of 73.
