= Edward Roberts (Canadian politician) =

Canadian lawyer and politician (1940–2022)

The Honourable Edward Roberts CM ONL KC

11th Lieutenant Governor of Newfoundland and Labrador
- In office November 1, 2002 – February 4, 2008
- Monarch: Elizabeth II
- Governors General: Adrienne Clarkson; Michaëlle Jean
- Premier: Roger Grimes; Danny Williams
- Preceded by: Arthur Maxwell House
- Succeeded by: John Crosbie

Member of the Newfoundland and Labrador House of Assembly for White Bay North
- In office September 8, 1966 – April 2, 1985
- Preceded by: Walter C. Carter
- Succeeded by: Chris Decker

Member of the Newfoundland and Labrador House of Assembly for Naskaupi
- In office June 25, 1992 – February 22, 1996
- Preceded by: Jim Kelland
- Succeeded by: Ernie McLean

Personal details
- Born: September 1, 1940 St. John's, Newfoundland
- Died: January 14, 2022 (aged 81) St. John's, Newfoundland and Labrador, Canada
- Spouse: Eve Roberts
- Profession: Politician

Edward Moxon Roberts CM ONL KC (September 1, 1940 – January 14, 2022) was a Canadian lawyer and politician. He first served as a member of the Newfoundland and Labrador House of Assembly (MHA) from 1966 to 1985 representing White Bay North, and again from 1992 to 1996 representing Naskaupi. He went on to serve as the eleventh lieutenant governor of Newfoundland and Labrador from 2002 until 2008.

== Early life ==
Roberts was born in St. John's, Dominion of Newfoundland, on September 1, 1940. His father, Harry Roberts, was a noted medical doctor in St. John's who founded a major pharmaceutical distribution company in Newfoundland and was also the owner of the Battery Hotel. After attending Holloway School and Prince of Wales Collegiate in his hometown, Roberts completed his secondary education at St. Andrew's College in Aurora, Ontario. He went on to study at the University of Toronto, first earning a Bachelor of Arts in 1960 before graduating with a Bachelor of Laws four years later.

Roberts subsequently articled with the Attorney General of Newfoundland and was called to the province's bar in February 1965. He went into private practice in 1978 with Halley, Hickman, Hunt, and Adams. A year later, he was appointed Queen's Counsel in 1978. He was eventually elevated to Master of the Supreme Court in 1989.

== Legislative career ==
=== First stint ===
Roberts served as the first executive assistant to premier Joey Smallwood starting in 1964. He entered provincial politics two years later, running in the 1966 Newfoundland general election for the provincial Liberals. He was elected to the House of Assembly, representing the riding of White Bay North. He was subsequently named first parliamentary assistant to Smallwood, before being appointed minister of public welfare in July 1968, and minister of health a year later. It was in that last role that Roberts presided over the implementation of Newfoundland's healthcare system. Moreover, the Health Sciences Centre hospital in St. John's was built and the Memorial University of Newfoundland Faculty of Medicine was established during his time in office.

During his tenure in the legislature, Roberts became noted as a "sharp-tongued debater", gaining the nickname "Scrap" from his closest friends. He won leadership of the provincial Liberals on the first ballot in February 1972, after Smallwood initially left politics, and consequently became Leader of the Opposition. Two years later, he fended off a challenge from Smallwood for the party leadership, retaining it in two ballots. Smallwood then formed a breakaway party called the Newfoundland Reform Liberal Party, which led to the Liberal vote being split in the 1975 election and the Progressive Conservatives maintaining power. Two years later, Roberts lost the party leadership to Bill Rowe. Roberts continued to sit in the legislature and served as House Leader for a time, before leaving politics for the first time in 1985.

=== Second stint ===
Roberts initially declined a request by Liberal leader Clyde Wells before the 1989 election to return to politics. He eventually relented and was appointed Minister of Justice and Attorney General, as well as Government House Leader, in February 1992. Roberts was the last unelected individual to be appointed to the provincial cabinet until Judy Manning in 2014. He proceeded to run in the by-election for Naskaupi in Labrador four months later and won the seat, despite the fact that he did not reside in Labrador. He was subsequently returned in the general election the following year. He remained justice minister briefly under Brian Tobin until retiring from politics the second and final time in March 1996, two months after Wells' own retirement. Roberts was the only person to serve as a cabinet minister in the province's first three Liberal governments, those of Smallwood, Wells, and Tobin, with a political career spanning thirty years.

After retiring from politics, Roberts served as chairman of the Board of Regents of Memorial University of Newfoundland from 1997 until his appointment as lieutenant governor in 2002. In that capacity, he pledged to expand the university's infrastructure and innovative programs.

== Lieutenant governor ==
Roberts was appointed lieutenant governor of Newfoundland and Labrador in November 2002 by governor general Adrienne Clarkson, on the advice of prime minister Jean Chrétien. During his tenure, he made Government House more accessible to the public and permitted media access. He also oversaw the inaugural installation of members of the Order of Newfoundland and Labrador through his appointment as Chancellor of the order. He became Honorary Chief of the Royal Newfoundland Constabulary in February 2003, and Honorary Colonel of the Royal Newfoundland Regiment in September that year. His term as lieutenant governor was due to expire in 2007, but he was asked by prime minister Stephen Harper in September 2007 to remain in his post for four more months. Roberts' term concluded on February 4, 2008, and he was succeeded by John Crosbie.

== Awards and honours ==
Roberts was appointed a member of the Order of Canada in May 2009 and invested eleven months later in April 2010. This was in recognition of "his contributions as a former cabinet minister and lieutenant governor of the province of Newfoundland and Labrador". He was granted an honorary Doctor of Law by Memorial University of Newfoundland in 2003.

== Personal life ==
Roberts was married to Eve Roberts, who was also a lawyer, until his death on January 14, 2022, at their home in the St. John's area, aged 81. Edward had four daughters, Catherine, Caroline, Jessica and Alison.

== Arms ==
Coat of arms of Edward Roberts
Notes The arms of Edward Roberts consist of: Crest A demi caribou Gules attired and holding with its dexter hoof a balance Argent. Escutcheon Paly of eight Gules and Argent a fess counterchanged, overall on a bend sinister Azure four coronets erablé Argent. Supporters Two Labrador dogs Or each gorged with a collar of Labrador spruce pendent therefrom a roundel of Labradorite. Compartment A rocky mound proper. Motto Quit Ye Like Men Be Strong

== See also ==
- List of people of Newfoundland and Labrador
