= 2011 Newfoundland and Labrador general election =

Canadian provincial election

- October 11, 2011

All 48 seats in the 47th General Assembly of Newfoundland and Labrador 25 seats needed for a majority
- Opinion polls
- Turnout: 57.9% (▼3.4 pp)
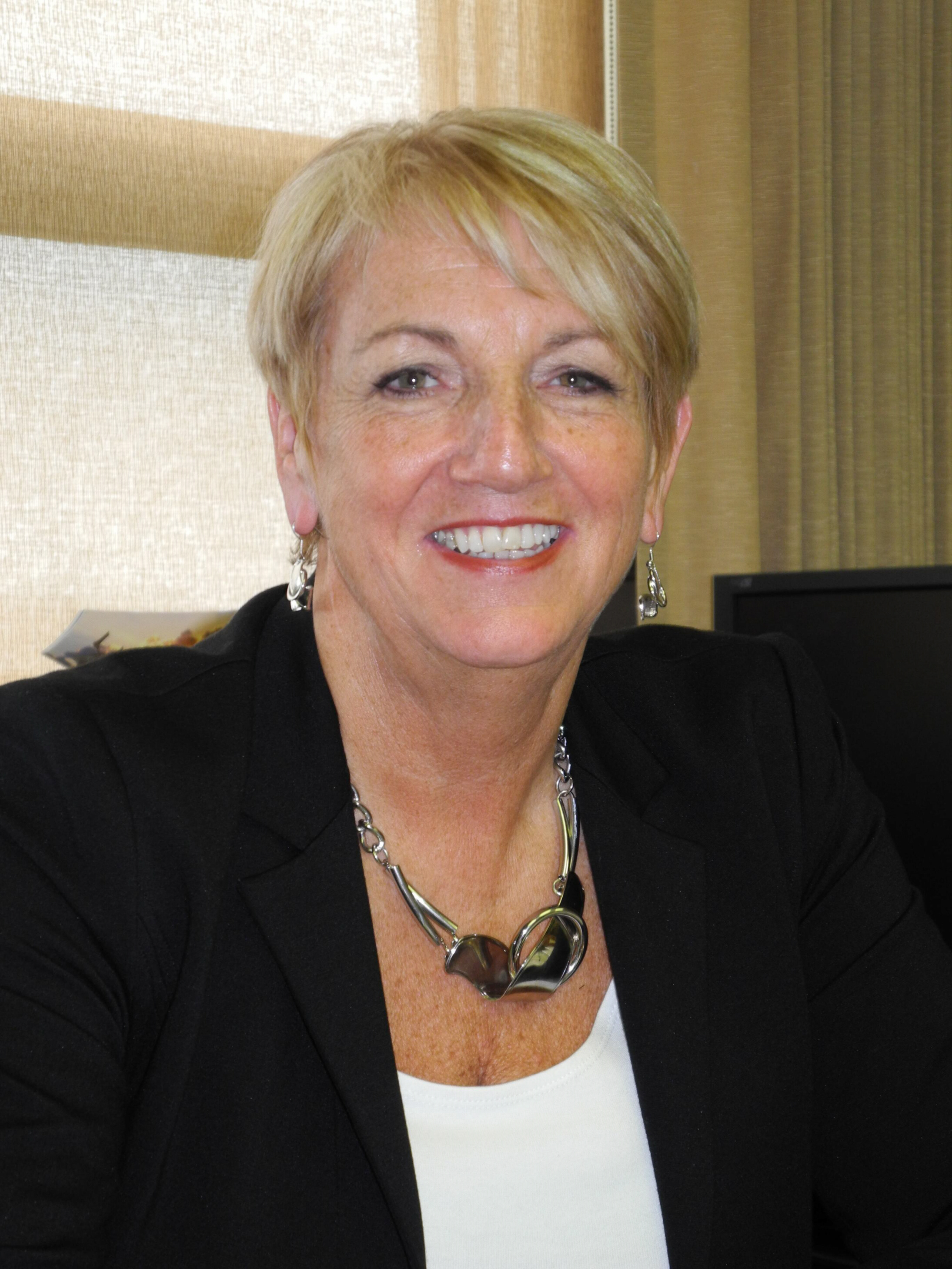

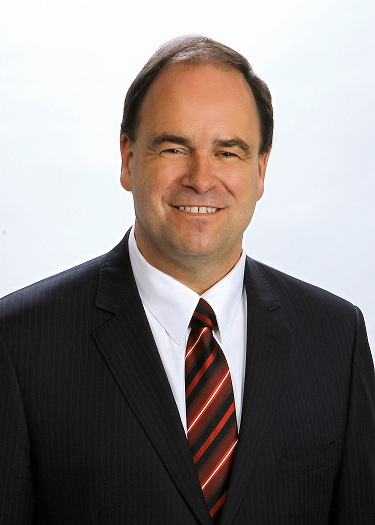

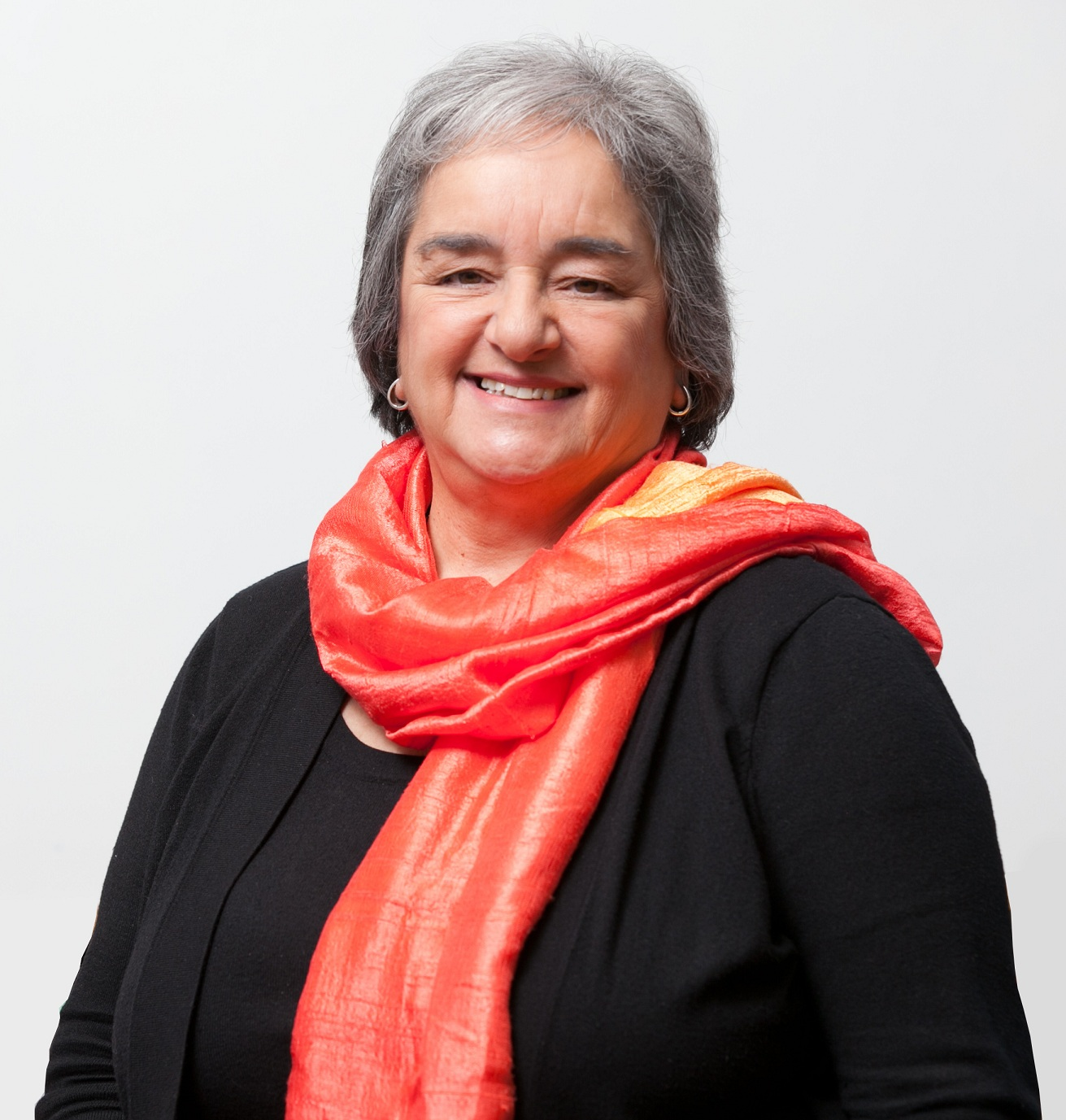
| | First party | Second party | Third party |
|---|---|---|---|
| Leader | Kathy Dunderdale | Kevin Aylward | Lorraine Michael |
| Party | Progressive Conservative | Liberal | New Democratic |
| Leader since | April 2, 2011 | August 14, 2011 | May 26, 2006 |
| Leader's seat | Virginia Waters | ran in St. George's-Stephenville East (lost) | Signal Hill-Quidi Vidi |
| Last election | 44 seats, 69.59% | 3 seats, 21.69% | 1 seat, 8.49% |
| Seats before | 43 | 4 | 1 |
| Seats won | 37 | 6 | 5 |
| Seat change | ▼6 | ▲2 | ▲4 |
| Popular vote | 124,523 | 42,417 | 54,713 |
| Percentage | 56.1% | 19.1% | 24.6% |
| Swing | ▼13.49 | ▼2.59 | ▲16.11 |
- Popular vote by riding. As this is an FPTP election, seat totals are not determined by popular vote, but instead via results by each riding. Click the map for more details.
Premier before election
Kathy Dunderdale
Progressive Conservative
Premier after election
Kathy Dunderdale
Progressive Conservative

The 2011 Newfoundland and Labrador general election took place on October 11, 2011, to elect members of the 47th General Assembly of Newfoundland and Labrador. The Progressive Conservative Party (PC Party) formed a majority government in the 2007 election, with the Liberal Party serving as the Official Opposition and the New Democratic Party (NDP) serving as a third party.

Under amendments passed by the Legislature in 2004, elections in Newfoundland and Labrador are now held on fixed dates: the second Tuesday in October every four years.

The Progressive Conservatives, led by Kathy Dunderdale, won their third consecutive majority government. Dunderdale became only the third woman in Canadian history to lead a political party to power. The Liberal Party, led by Kevin Aylward, formed the Official Opposition, however the party placed third in the popular vote and Aylward himself was not elected to the legislature. Lorraine Michael's New Democratic Party won a record number of seats and placed second in the popular vote for the first time in the province's history.

== Background ==
=== Progressive Conservative Party ===
Leader: Kathy Dunderdale

Under Dunderdale's leadership the PC Party won a third straight majority government, winning 37 seats in the House of Assembly and taking 56% of the popular vote. The party platform included the phasing out of the payroll tax over six years, eliminating provincial student loans and replacing them with needs-based grants over four years, improving health care wait times, establishing a ceiling for new spending growth, investing a third of any surplus into unfunded public pension funds, the creation of a population growth strategy, reforming the adoption process to make it easier for people to adopt children and provide province-wide high-speed access within four years. While releasing the platform Dunderdale stated that promises outlined were contingent on fiscal conditions in the months and years to come.

=== Liberal Party ===
Leader: Kevin Aylward

Under Aylward's leadership the Liberal Party won a total of six seats. While they increased their number of seats, by two, the party placed third in the popular with 19.1%, the worst showing in their history. The party platform advocated for the creation of a legacy fund for offshore oil revenues, a new deal to develop the Lower Churchill hydroelectric development, annual increase to retired public service pensions, improve high-speed internet and cellphone service in rural areas, merge the Department of Business with the Department of Innovation, Trade, and Rural Development, establish a fisheries investment and diversification fund, creation of a fisheries loan board, initiate a judicial inquiry dealing with management of the fishery and operating a marine rescue subcentre in the province.

=== New Democratic Party ===
Leader: Lorraine Michael

Under Michael's leadership the NDP won a total of five seats and took 24.6% of the popular vote, the best result in the party's history. While the party placed second in the popular vote they placed third in seats. Their platform advocated for a 25% reduction in the small business tax, an all-day kindergarten pilot project starting in September 2012, an independent review of the health care system, elimination of the “tax on tax” on gasoline and diesel fuel, regular increases in the minimum wage, reductions in public post-secondary tuition fees with a move towards free tuition, and the introduction of a three per cent petroleum royalty surcharge on oil companies.

== Party leadership ==
Following Liberal leader Gerry Reid's defeat in the 2007 general election he resigned as the party's leader. The party subsequently chose Cartwright-L'Anse au Clair MHA Yvonne Jones as interim leader of the party and therefore the Official Opposition Leader in the House of Assembly. The party delayed calling a leadership election until 2010, and when nominations for the leadership closed on July 30, 2010, Jones was the only candidate to come forward and was acclaimed leader of the party. Only weeks later on August 13, 2010, Jones announced she had been diagnosed with breast cancer and would be taking time off to undergo treatment. During her time off Liberal House Leader Kelvin Parsons took over for Jones on an interim basis. The Liberal convention that would swear Jones in as leader was rescheduled from October 2010, to May 2011, due to her illness. She was sworn in as leader on May 28, 2011. On August 8, 2011, it was announced that Jones would step down as leader the following day on the advice of her doctor. The Liberal Party executive chose former MHA and cabinet minister Kevin Aylward as her successor on August 14, 2011.

On November 25, 2010, Premier Danny Williams made the surprise announcement that he would resign as leader and premier the next week. On December 3, 2010, Kathy Dunderdale, Williams' Deputy Premier, was sworn in as Newfoundland and Labrador's tenth Premier. Although she had originally stated she would not seek the permanent leadership she announced on December 30, 2010, she would run for the Progressive Conservative leadership. Her announcement came after several high-profile cabinet ministers announced they would not run and endorsed her candidacy. In January 2011, Dunderdale was acclaimed party leader when she was the only eligible candidate to seek the leadership. On April 2, 2011, she was sworn in as leader of the Progressive Conservatives.

== Timeline ==
=== 2007 ===
- October 9, 2007: Elections held for the Newfoundland and Labrador Legislature in the 46th General Assembly of Newfoundland and Labrador.
- November 6, 2007: Progressive Conservative Susan Sullivan wins a deferred election in Grand Falls-Windsor-Buchans.
- November 13, 2007: Liberal leader Gerry Reid resign after failing to be re-elected.
- November 15, 2007: The Liberal Party select Yvonne Jones as interim leader of the party.

=== 2008 ===
- May 21, 2008: Tom Rideout resigns as Deputy Premier, Government House Leader and Minister of Fisheries, in a dispute with the Premier's Office.
- June 4, 2008: Cape St. Francis MHA Jack Byrne dies.
- June 30, 2008: Baie Verte-Springdale MHA Tom Rideout resigns his seat.
- August 27, 2008: Two by-elections in Cape St. Francis and Baie Verte-Springdale are won by Progressive Conservative candidates Kevin Parsons and Kevin Pollard.

=== 2009 ===
- October 2, 2009: The Straits – White Bay North MHA Trevor Taylor resigns from Cabinet and his seat.
- October 7, 2009: Terra Nova MHA Paul Oram resign from Cabinet and his seat.
- October 27, 2009: A by-election in The Straits – White Bay North elects Liberal Marshall Dean.
- November 26, 2009: A by-election in Terra Nova elects PC Sandy Collins.

=== 2010 ===
- January 29, 2010: Topsail MHA Elizabeth Marshall resigns her seat to be appointed to the Senate of Canada.
- March 16, 2010: A by-election in Topsail elects PC Paul Davis.
- July 30, 2010: Cartwright-L'Anse au Clair MHA Yvonne Jones is acclaimed Liberal leader after being the only candidate for the party's leader.
- August 13, 2010: Yvonne Jones announces she has been diagnosed with breast cancer and that MHA Kelvin Parsons will serve as interim leader while she is receiving treatment.
- October 3, 2010: Conception Bay East - Bell Island MHA and Minister Dianne Whalen dies.
- November 25, 2010: Premier Danny Williams, Humber West MHA announces his retirement, effective December 3, 2010. Deputy Premier Kathy Dunderdale will be the Premier of the province in the interim.
- December 2, 2010: Progressive Conservative candidate David Brazil is elected MHA of Conception Bay East - Bell Island.
- December 3, 2010: Kathy Dunderdale is sworn in as the province's tenth Premier upon the resignation of Danny Williams, the first woman to do so.

=== 2011 ===
- February 15, 2011: Progressive Conservative candidate Vaughn Granter is elected MHA of Humber West.
- April 2, 2011: Kathy Dunderdale is sworn in as leader of the Progressive Conservative Party.
- May 28, 2011: Yvonne Jones is sworn in as leader of the Liberal Party.
- August 9, 2011: Jones steps down as leader of the Liberal Party for health reasons.
- August 14, 2011: Kevin Aylward is chosen as leader of the Liberal Party.
- September 19, 2011: Election call, Kathy Dunderdale asks Lieutenant Governor John Crosbie to dissolve the legislature.

== Campaign ==
At 10:00 am on September 19, 2011, Premier Dunderdale met with Lieutenant Governor John Crosbie who dissolved the 46th General Assembly, officially launching the election campaign. It was widely expected that the PCs would win the election.

=== Campaign slogans ===
The parties campaign slogans for the 2011 election are:

- Liberal Party – "We Can Do Better"
- New Democratic Party – "It's Time"
- Progressive Conservative – "New Energy"

=== Issues ===
Muskrat Falls

The tentative deal to develop the $6.2 billion Muskrat Falls hydroelectric project in Labrador was negotiated by the Progressive Conservative government in November 2010. The Liberal Party opposes the deal, saying it is bad for the province because it will increase the province's debt and will see electricity rates increase for consumers. The NDP have had similar concerns and both party leaders have called for spending on the project to stop until more independent analysis' can be conducted to see if the current deal is the best one for the province.

Public sector pension increases

The Liberal Party announced they would provide a one-time increase to public sector pensioners of 2.5%, as well as provide annual increases equivalent to the Consumer Price Index (CPI) up to 2%. While Aylward has said increasing payments would cost $13 million in the first year and about $10 million extra for each additional year, the Department of Finance stated that the plan would add $1.2 billion in additional liabilities to the pension plan. Dunderdale slammed the Liberal Party's plan calling it 'foolhardy'.

=== Controversies ===
Dunderdale confrontation with fisheries workers

Toward the end of the campaign, Tory Leader Kathy Dunderdale was confronted by frustrated fisheries workers in Marystown in the district of Burin-Placentia West held by Minister of Fisheries & Aquaculture Clyde Jackman. Dunderdale, accompanied by Jackman and Grand Bank district MHA Darin King, refused to negotiate with the workers until after the election. Jackman went on to win the election by only 40 votes.

Dumaresque comment

Controversy arose at the St. John's Board of Trade debate when Liberal candidate Danny Dumaresque was asked about an appeal by the mayor of St. John's for a new financial arrangement between the city and the provincial government. Dumaresque stated that "there are a hell of a lot more priorities outside the overpass that need to be addressed before we start forking more money over to the City of St. John's." The comment led to divisions within the party, with Liberal candidate Drew Brown stating it was an “idiotic comment by an idiotic man.”

== Election summary ==
| Party | Seats | Second | Third | Fourth |
|---|---|---|---|---|
| Progressive Conservative | 37 | 10 | 1 | 0 |
| Liberal | 6 | 15 | 27 | 0 |
| New Democratic | 5 | 23 | 20 | 0 |
| Other | 0 | 0 | 0 | 3 |

Summary of the House of Assembly of Newfoundland and Labrador election results
| Party | Party leader | Candidates | Seats | | | | Popular vote | | |
| Party | Party leader | Candidates | 2007 | Dissol. | 2011 | Change | # | % | % Change |
|---|---|---|---|---|---|---|---|---|---|
| Progressive Conservative | Kathy Dunderdale | 48 | 44 | 43 | 37 | -6 | 124,523 | 56.1% | -13.49% |
| Liberal | Kevin Aylward | 48 | 3 | 4 | 6 | +2 | 42.417 | 19.1% | -2.59% |
| New Democratic | Lorraine Michael | 48 | 1 | 1 | 5 | +4 | 54,713 | 24.6% | +16.11% |
| Independents | | 3 | 0 | 0 | 0 | 0 | 430 | 0.2% | |
| Total | | | 48 | 48 | 48 | | 222,083 | 100% | |

=== Results by region ===
| Party Name | | St. John's | St. John's Metro | Avalon/Burin | Central | Western/ Southern | Labrador | Total |
|---|---|---|---|---|---|---|---|---|
Parties winning seats in the legislature:
| Progressive Conservative | Seats: | 4 | 6 | 9 | 11 | 5 | 2 | 37 |
| Progressive Conservative | Popular Vote: | 47.47% | 63.29% | 62.87% | 59.18% | 51.13% | 44.14% | |
| Liberal | Seats: | 0 | 0 | 0 | 0 | 4 | 2 | 6 |
| Liberal | Popular Vote: | 7.1% | 5.21% | 17.10% | 24.49% | 33.76% | 31.45% | |
| New Democratic | Seats: | 4 | 0 | 0 | 0 | 1 | 0 | 5 |
| New Democratic | Popular Vote: | 45.43% | 31.51% | 19.08% | 15.61% | 14.67% | 24.40% | |
Parties that won no seats in the legislature
| Independent | Popular Vote: | | | | 0.73% | 0.14% | | |
| Total seats: | | 8 | 6 | 9 | 11 | 10 | 4 | 48 |

== Results by district ==
Bold incumbents indicates party leaders. The premier's name is boldfaced and italicized.

- All candidate names are those on the official list of confirmed candidates; names in media or on party website may differ slightly.
- Names in **boldface type** represent party leaders.
- † represents that the incumbent is not running again.
- § represents that the incumbent was defeated for nomination.
- ₰ represents that the incumbent ran in another district and lost the nomination
- ‡ represents that the incumbent is running in a different district.

=== St. John's ===
| Electoral district | Candidates | | | Incumbent |
| Electoral district | PC | Liberal | NDP | Incumbent |
|---|---|---|---|---|
| Kilbride; 55.10% turnout | John Dinn; 3,347; 58.32% | Brian Hanlon; 454; 7.91% | Paul Boundridge; 1,927; 33.58% | John Dinn |
| Signal Hill—Quidi Vidi; 59.44% turnout | John Noseworthy; 1,550; 31.17% | Drew Brown; 173; 3.48% | **Lorraine Michael**; 3,239; 65.13% | **Lorraine Michael** |
| St. John's Centre; 59.60% turnout | Shawn Skinner; 2,041; 43.13% | Carly Bigelow; 109; 2.30% | Gerry Rogers; 2,569; 54.29% | Shawn Skinner |
| St. John's East; 64.11% turnout | Ed Buckingham; 2,175; 40.77% | Mike Duffy; 367; 6.88% | George Murphy; 2,766; 51.85% | Ed Buckingham |
| St. John's North; 52.25% turnout | Bob Ridgley; 1,905; 40.29% | Elizabeth Scammel Reynolds; 201; 4.25% | Dale Kirby; 2,595; 54.89% | Bob Ridgley |
| St. John's South; 63.66% turnout | Tom Osborne; 2,967; 57.71% | Trevor Hickey; 163; 3.17% | Keith Dunne; 1,994; 38.79% | Tom Osborne |
| St. John's West; 59.60% turnout | Dan Crummell; 2,004; 43.25% | George Joyce; 890; 19.21% | Chris Pickard; 1,729; 37.32% | Sheila Osborne† |
| Virginia Waters; 55.34% turnout | **Kathy Dunderdale**; 3,371; 59.85% | Sheila Miller; 536; 9.52% | Dave Sullivan; 1,708; 30.33% | **Kathy Dunderdale** |

=== St. John's suburbs ===
| Electoral district | Candidates | | | Incumbent |
| Electoral district | PC | Liberal | NDP | Incumbent |
|---|---|---|---|---|
| Cape St. Francis; 65.53% turnout | Kevin Parsons; 4,132; 59.06% | Joy Buckle; 204; 2.92% | Geoff Gallant; 2,623; 37.49% | Kevin Parsons |
| Conception Bay East - Bell Island; 49.63% turnout | David Brazil; 3,059; 54.91% | Kim Ploughman; 213; 3.82% | Bill Kavanagh; 2,290; 41.11% | David Brazil |
| Conception Bay South; 51.40% turnout | Terry French; 3,632; 69.01% | Cynthia Layden Barron; 354; 6.73% | Noah Davis-Power; 1,263; 24.00% | Terry French |
| Mount Pearl North; 51.93% turnout | Steve Kent; 3,727; 70.82% | Maurice Budgell; 363; 6.90% | Kurtis Coombs; 994; 18.89% | Steve Kent |
| Mount Pearl South; 53.42% turnout | Paul Lane; 2,375; 54.52% | Norm Snelgrove; 299; 6.86% | John Riche; 1,675; 38.45% | Dave Denine† |
| Topsail; 49.85% turnout | Paul Davis; 3,860; 68.26% | Nic Reid; 280; 4.95% | Brian Nolan; 1,507; 26.65% | Paul Davis |

=== Avalon and Burin Peninsulas ===
| Electoral district | Candidates | | | | Incumbent |
| Electoral district | PC | Liberal | NDP | Other | Incumbent |
|---|---|---|---|---|---|
| Bellevue; 65.34% turnout | Calvin Peach; 3,005; 60.12% | Pam Pardy Ghent; 626; 12.53% | Gabe Ryan; 1,356; 27.13% | | Calvin Peach |
| Burin—Placentia West; 69.16% turnout | Clyde Jackman; 2,538; 48.34% | Jacqueline Mullett; 202; 3.85% | Julie Mitchell; 2,498; 47.58% | | Clyde Jackman |
| Carbonear—Harbour Grace; 56.71% turnout | Jerome Kennedy; 3,993; 75.94% | Phillip Earle; 774; 14.72% | Shawn Hyde; 445; 8.46% | Kyle Brookings (Independent); 22; 0.42% | Jerome Kennedy |
| Ferryland; 58.16% turnout | Keith Hutchings; 3,640; 71.99% | Dianne Randell; 181; 3.58% | Chris Molloy; 1,224; 24.21% | | Keith Hutchings |
| Grand Bank; 69.17% turnout | Darin King; 3,271; 68.33% | Carol Anne Haley; 1,336; 27.91% | Wally Layman; 167; 3.49% | | Darin King |
| Harbour Main; 57.08% turnout | Tom Hedderson; 3,600; 69.32% | Bern Hickey; 580; 11.17% | Mike Maher; 990; 19.06% | | Tom Hedderson |
| Placentia—St. Mary's; 68.55% turnout | Felix Collins; 2,516; 49.71% | Todd Squires; 1,055; 20.85% | Trish Dodd; 1,475; 29.14% | | Felix Collins |
| Port de Grave; 66.49% turnout | Glenn Littlejohn; 3,551; 59.33% | Leanne Hussey; 2,022; 33.78% | Sarah Downey; 396; 6.62% | | Roland Butler† |
| Trinity—Bay de Verde; 67.21% turnout | Charlene Johnson; 2,889; 61.73% | Barry Snow; 1,114; 23.86% | Sheina Lerman; 659; 14.11% | | Charlene Johnson |

=== Central Newfoundland ===
| Electoral district | Candidates | | | | Incumbent |
| Electoral district | PC | Liberal | NDP | Other | Incumbent |
|---|---|---|---|---|---|
| Baie Verte—Springdale; 59.79% turnout | Kevin Pollard; 2,552; 52.65% | Neil Ward; 1,827; 37.69% | Tim Howse; 456; 9.41% | | Kevin Pollard |
| Bonavista North; 53.71% turnout | Eli Cross; 1,723; 46.26% | Paul Kean; 1,518; 40.75% | John Coaker; 467; 12.54% | | Harry Harding† |
| Bonavista South; 57.95% turnout | Glen Little; 2,214; 55.99% | Johanna Ryan Guy; 532; 13.45% | Darryl Johnson; 1,198; 30.30% | | Roger Fitzgerald† |
| Exploits; 53.18% turnout | Clayton Forsey; 2,819; 68.64% | Jim Samson; 654; 15.92% | Grant Hemeon; 629; 15.32% | | Clayton Forsey |
| Gander; 49.48% turnout | Kevin O'Brien; 2,393; 52.09% | Barry Warren; 1,415; 30.80% | Lukas Norman; 770; 16.76% | | Kevin O'Brien |
| Grand Falls-Windsor—Buchans; 63.76% turnout | Susan Sullivan; 2,957; 61.44% | Wayne Morris; 1,540; 31.20% | John Whelan; 313; 6.27% | | Susan Sullivan |
| Grand Falls-Windsor—Green Bay South; 52.64% turnout | Ray Hunter; 2,131; 57.16% | Merv Wiseman; 1,165; 31.25% | Clyde Bridger; 418; 11.21% | | Ray Hunter |
| Lewisporte; 55.91% turnout | Wade Verge; 2,450; 56.48% | Todd Manuel; 891; 20.54% | Lloyd Snow; 988; 22.78% | | Wade Verge |
| Terra Nova; 52.75% turnout | Sandy Collins; 2,785; 62.92% | Ryan Lane; 631; 14.26% | Robin Brentnall; 648; 14.64% | John Baird (Independent); 346; 7.82% | Sandy Collins |
| The Isles of Notre Dame; 58.48% turnout | Derrick Dalley; 2,746; 67.48% | Danny Dumaresque; 1,070; 26.12% | Tree Walsh; 252; 6.15% | | Derrick Dalley |
| Trinity North; 57.14% turnout | Ross Wiseman; 3,211; 66.74% | Brad Cabana; 344; 7.15% | Vanessa Wiseman; 1,247; 25.92% | | Ross Wiseman |

=== Western and Southern Newfoundland ===
| Electoral district | Candidates | | | | Incumbent |
| Electoral district | PC | Liberal | NDP | Other | Incumbent |
|---|---|---|---|---|---|
| Bay of Islands; 69.98% turnout | Terry Loder; 2,003; 37.05% | Eddie Joyce; 2,760; 51.05% | Tony Adey; 625; 11.56% | | Terry Loder |
| Burgeo—La Poile; 56.60% turnout | Colin Short; 1,850; 43.14% | Andrew Parsons; 2,228; 51.96% | Matt Fuchs; 197; 4.59% | | Kelvin Parsons† |
| Fortune Bay—Cape La Hune; 63.45% turnout | Tracey Perry; 2,592; 67.06% | Eric Skinner; 596; 15.42% | Susan Skinner; 665; 17.21% | | Tracey Perry |
| Humber East; 51.03% turnout | Tom Marshall; 3,493; 77.97% | Charles Murphy; 378; 8.44% | Marc Best; 593; 13.24% | | Tom Marshall |
| Humber Valley; 67.77% turnout | Darryl Kelly; 2,541; 46.72% | Dwight Ball; 2,609; 47.97% | Sheldon Hynes; 270; 4.96% | | Darryl Kelly |
| Humber West; 47.07% turnout | Vaughn Granter; 2,335; 59.28% | Donna Luther; 832; 21.12% | Jordan Stringer; 765; 19.42% | | Vaughn Granter |
| Port au Port; 52.61% turnout | Tony Cornect; 2,609; 58.69% | Kate Mitchell-Mansfield; 954; 21.46% | Jamie Brace; 860; 19.35% | | Tony Cornect |
| St. Barbe; 57.19% turnout | Wallace Young; 1,779; 44.05% | Jim Bennett; 1816; 44.94% | Diane Ryan; 437; 10.82% | | Wallace Young |
| St. George's—Stephenville East; 53.86% turnout | Joan Burke; 2,104; 49.08% | **Kevin Aylward**; 1,396; 32.56% | Bernice Hancock; 705; 16.45% | Dean Simon (Independent); 62; 1.45% | Joan Burke |
| The Straits - White Bay North; 62.03% turnout | Selma Pike; 1,336; 31.46% | Marshall Dean; 1,382; 32.54% | Chris Mitchelmore; 1,511; 35.58% | | Marshall Dean |

=== Labrador ===
| Electoral district | Candidates | | | Incumbent |
| Electoral district | PC | Liberal | NDP | Incumbent |
|---|---|---|---|---|
| Cartwright—L'Anse au Clair; 67.89% turnout | Glen Acreman; 576; 26.77% | Yvonne Jones; 1,516; 71.07% | Bill Cooper; 44; 2.06% | Yvonne Jones |
| Labrador West; 54.13% turnout | Nick McGrath; 1,843; 50.80% | Karen Oldford; 593; 16.35% | Tom Harris; 1,182; 32.58% | Jim Baker† |
| Lake Melville; 52.41% turnout | Keith Russell; 1,741; 49.50% | Chris Montague; 531; 15.10% | Arlene Michelin-Pittman; 1,209; 34.38% | John Hickey† |
| Torngat Mountains; 72.74% turnout | Patty Pottle; 586; 37.66% | Randy Edmunds; 744; 47.81% | Alex Saunders; 186; 11.95% | Patty Pottle |

== MHAs not running again ==
MHA's who announced they were not seeking re-election

=== Liberal ===
- Roland Butler (Port de grave)

- Kelvin Parsons (Burgeo- La Polie)

=== Progressive Conservative ===
- Jim Baker (Labrador west)

- Dave Denine (Mount Pearl south)

-Roger Fitzgerald (Bonavista South)

-Harry Harding (Bonavista North)

- John Hickey (Lake Melville)

- Shelia Osborne (St. John's west)

== Opinion polls ==

| Polling Firm | Date of Polling | Link | Progressive Conservative | Liberal | New Democratic |
| Corporate Research Associates | September 29 – October 3, 2011 | HTML | 59 | 16 | 25 |
| Environics | September 29 – October 4, 2011 | HTML | 54 | 13 | 33 |
| MarketQuest Omnifacts Research | September 28–30, 2011 | HTML | 54 | 13 | 33 |
| MarketQuest Omnifacts Research | September 16–19, 2011 | HTML | 53 | 18 | 29 |
| Corporate Research Associates | August 15–31, 2011 | PDF | 54 | 22 | 24 |
| Corporate Research Associates | May 11–28, 2011 | PDF | 57 | 22 | 20 |
| Corporate Research Associates | February 10–28, 2011 | PDF | 73 | 18 | 8 |
| Corporate Research Associates | November 9–30, 2010 | PDF | 75 | 16 | 8 |
| Corporate Research Associates | August 10–30, 2010 | PDF | 76 | 17 | 7 |
| Corporate Research Associates | May 11–31, 2010 | PDF | 75 | 16 | 8 |
| Corporate Research Associates | February 9–25, 2010 | PDF | 80 | 15 | 5 |
| Corporate Research Associates | November 5–22, 2009 | PDF | 77 | 16 | 7 |
| Corporate Research Associates | August 11–29, 2009 | PDF | 77 | 15 | 8 |
| Corporate Research Associates | May 12–30, 2009 | PDF | 72 | 19 | 8 |
| Corporate Research Associates | February 11–28, 2009 | PDF | 71 | 22 | 7 |
| Corporate Research Associates | November 5 – December 2, 2008 | PDF | 72 | 19 | 9 |
| Corporate Research Associates | August 12–30, 2008 | PDF | 78 | 14 | 7 |
| Corporate Research Associates | May 8 – June 1, 2008 | PDF | 77 | 13 | 8 |
| Corporate Research Associates | February 12 – March 4, 2008 | PDF | 79 | 14 | 6 |
| Corporate Research Associates | November 9 – December 3, 2007 | PDF | 82 | 12 | 7 |
| Election 2007 | October 9, 2007 | HTML | 69.6 | 21.7 | 8.5 |

== Political parties ==
- Progressive Conservative Party of Newfoundland and Labrador
- Liberal Party of Newfoundland and Labrador
- Newfoundland and Labrador New Democratic Party
