= Yvonne Jones =

Canadian politician (born 1968)

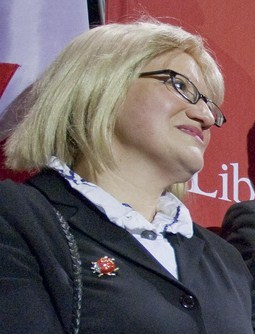

Parliamentary Secretary to the Minister of Northern Affairs
- In office December 2, 2015 – March 23, 2025
- Minister: Carolyn Bennett
- Preceded by: Mark Strahl

Member of Parliament for Labrador
- In office May 13, 2013 – March 23, 2025
- Preceded by: Peter Penashue
- Succeeded by: Philip Earle

Leader of the Opposition in Newfoundland and Labrador
- In office November 13, 2007 – January 3, 2012
- Preceded by: Gerry Reid
- Succeeded by: Dwight Ball

Leader of the Newfoundland and Labrador Liberal Party
- In office Interim: November 13, 2007 – May 28, 2011; May 28, 2011 – August 14, 2011
- Preceded by: Gerry Reid
- Succeeded by: Kevin Aylward

Member of the Newfoundland and Labrador House of Assembly for Cartwright-L'Anse au Clair
- In office February 22, 1996 – April 8, 2013
- Preceded by: Riding Established
- Succeeded by: Lisa Dempster

Mayor of Mary's Harbour
- In office 1991–1996

Personal details
- Born: March 15, 1968 (age 58) Mary's Harbour, Newfoundland, Canada
- Party: Liberal Party of Canada (2013-present)
- Other political affiliations: Liberal Party of Newfoundland and Labrador (1999-2013); Independent (1996-1999)
- Spouse: Joseph Lanzon
- Education: West Viking College
- Occupation: Journalist, Researcher, Politician
- Cabinet: Minister Responsible for the Status of Women (2003) Minister of Fisheries & Aquaculture (2003)
- Website: Official website

Yvonne Jean Jones (born March 15, 1968) is a Canadian politician in Newfoundland and Labrador, who served in the House of Commons of Canada from 2013 to 2025. She represented the district of Labrador as a member of the Liberal Party caucus. On December 2, 2015, she was appointed Parliamentary Secretary to the Minister of Indigenous and Northern Affairs. Jones is a NunatuKavummiut, a group of Indigenous Canadians, who claim the disputed area of NunatuKavut. She did not seek re-election in 2025.

From 1996 to 2013, Jones represented the district of Cartwright-L'Anse au Clair in the Newfoundland and Labrador House of Assembly. During her career in provincial politics, she served as Minister of Fisheries in Premier Roger Grimes' government, and later as a leader of the Liberal Party of Newfoundland and Labrador and Leader of the Official Opposition.

== Provincial politics ==
Jones has training in journalism and has worked for many community newspapers throughout the province. She has also served as an employment counselor and field worker for the Battle Harbour Development Association with Human Resources Development Canada.

Jones served as mayor of Mary's Harbour, Labrador from 1991 to 1996. In 1996, she sought the Liberal Party nomination for the provincial electoral district of Cartwright-L'Anse au Clair in that year's general election. Jones lost the nomination to incumbent Danny Dumaresque, but subsequently ran as an Independent candidate. She was elected to the House of Assembly in the 1996 general election, defeating Dumaresque, a two-term MHA. Jones became the Liberal Party's candidate for the 1999 election. She was re-elected in 1999, 2003, 2007 and 2011.

After serving two years as a Parliamentary Secretary Jones was appointed to cabinet In February 2003, by Premier Roger Grimes. She was sworn in as the Minister of Fisheries and Aquaculture and as the Minister Responsible for the Status of Women. Jones held the post till the Liberal government was defeated in the provincial election in October of that year.

In 2004, Jones was the only member of the House of Assembly to vote against the Labrador Inuit Land Claims Agreement (Bill 44). During the legislative debate Jones stated "The proposed treaty we have before us today is very complex. I certainly do not think and I know it was not the intention of the LIA [Labrador Inuit Association] to stigmatize or exclude the possibility for settlement of a claim with Metis people. I know that, Mr. Speaker. I have asked the government to give me the greatest assurances possible that this treaty would not prejudice the future acceptance of a claim for Metis in Labrador. Those assurances have not been satisfactory to the leadership of the Labrador Metis Nation, to their President, Todd Russell, to their elders and their members, and therefore, Mr. Speaker, it is not satisfactory to me". During this debate Jones also stated "I am a Metis and I am very proud of who I am. I am descendant from the bloodline of Inuit and the English".

Jones was an outspoken critic of the Muskrat Falls hydro development.

=== Liberal leader ===
Jones was one of only three Liberal Members of the House of Assembly (MHA) re-elected in the 2007 provincial election. On November 15, 2007, she was named the interim leader of the Liberal Party and Official Opposition Leader, after party leader Gerry Reid was defeated in his own district. Jones became the first woman to lead the Liberal Party in the province. The party originally planned to hold a leadership convention to select a new, permanent leader in 2008, but postponed the vote twice. Jones continued to serve as interim leader during this period of time, and in December 2009, announced her intention to run for the permanent leadership when the convention was to be scheduled. On July 30, 2010, Jones was acclaimed Liberal leader after she was the only person to file nomination papers for the position.

She was expected to be sworn in as leader at the party's convention in November of that year, however the convention was delayed when Jones announced in August that she would be taking a leave of absence from her position to undergo treatment for breast cancer. She returned to work in early 2011, and was sworn in as Liberal leader at the party's Spring leadership convention.

==== By-elections ====
On October 27, 2009, the district of The Straits – White Bay North held a by-election, to replace Minister of Transportation and Works, Trevor Taylor, who resigned on October 2, 2009. Liberal candidate Marshall Dean won the election taking nearly 48% of the vote and defeating the Progressive Conservative candidate by 126 votes.

==== Public opinion ====
Under Jones' leadership the Liberal Party remained in second place in public opinion polls. After receiving 22% in the 2007 general election, the party's support has not risen above those levels. For the majority of time since the election their support has been in the mid-teens according to polls conducted by Corporate Research Associates (CRA). Jones' own popularity had consistently remained lower than her own party's; CRA's quarterly polls on Newfoundland and Labrador politics have found that no more than 11% of those surveyed have felt Jones would make the best premier. A NTV Telelink poll conducted in February 2011, found that 13% of decided voters would support the Liberal Party and that 12% thought Jones was the best choice to be premier.

The results of the NTV Telelink poll led former Liberal provincial and federal cabinet minister John Efford to criticize Jones's leadership. Efford said that Jones would not become premier and while he did not call on her to resign as leader, he did say that "it's clear what she ought to do in the face of poor polling results".

A CRA poll in March 2011, saw Jones' personal popularity rise to 18%, her highest level since becoming Liberal leader in 2007. Her personal popularity was also tied with that of her party. On June 7, 2011, CRA released a poll showing that Jones' popularity had dropped slightly to 16% but her party's support had risen to 22%. While the Progressive Conservatives still held a large lead in the poll, at 57%, the Liberals were statistically tied with the New Democrats, who had the support of 20% of those surveyed.

=== Resignation ===
On August 9, 2011, two months before the provincial election, Jones announced that she was resigning as leader due to a slower recovery from breast cancer than she expected. She sought re-election in her district during the 2011 provincial election, and won 71 per cent of the popular vote.

== Federal politics ==
In April 2013, Jones resigned her seat in the Newfoundland and Labrador House of Assembly to run as the Liberal candidate in the federal by-election in Labrador created by the resignation of Peter Penashue. She defeated Penashue to win the seat on May 13, 2013. She was sworn in on June 4, 2013.

Upon her election, Jones was appointed the Liberal critic for Northern Development, the Northern Economic Development Agency, the Arctic Council, the Atlantic Canada Opportunities Agency, and Search and Rescue. In August 2013, Jones was elected Chair of the Liberal Party of Canada Newfoundland and Labrador caucus. In February 2014, she became Vice-Chair of the Public Accounts committee.

On December 2, 2015, Jones was appointed Parliamentary Secretary to the Minister of Indigenous and Northern Affairs.

In late August 2018, Jones was appointed as Parliamentary Secretary to the Minister of Intergovernmental and Northern affairs and Internal Trade.

Jones was re-elected in the 2019 federal election. On December 12, 2019, Jones was appointed Parliamentary Secretary to the Minister of Northern Affairs.

On April 19, 2021, Nunavut NDP MP Mumilaaq Qaqqaq claimed that Jones was "not an Inuk," and southern Labrador is "not an Inuit region". Jones dismissed Qaqqaq's comments as “immature and naïve”. Qaqqaq later issued an email statement apologizing “for how I handled the situation”.

Jones was re-elected in the 2021 federal election.

On June 14, 2023, Jones announced that she had “successfully battled breast cancer for the second time.”

On January 10, 2025, Jones announced that she would not be running again in the coming federal election.

== Electoral record ==
=== Federal ===
2021 Canadian federal election: Labrador
Party	Candidate	Votes	%	±%	Expenditures
Liberal	Yvonne Jones	4,119	42.67	+0.19	$69,064.75
Conservative	Shane Dumaresque	2,930	30.35	-0.72	$9,399.17
New Democratic	Amy Norman	2,297	23.80	-0.69	$4,902.92
People's	Shannon Champion	307	3.18	–	none listed
Total valid votes/expense limit		9,653	99.04		$107,802.67
Total rejected ballots		94	0.96	-0.24	
Turnout		9,747	48.16	-9.10	
Registered voters		20,239			
Liberal hold		Swing		+0.45	
Source: Elections Canada

2019 Canadian federal election: Labrador
Party	Candidate	Votes	%	±%	Expenditures
Liberal	Yvonne Jones	4,851	42.48	-29.27	$82,443.39
Conservative	Larry Flemming	3,548	31.07	+17.20	$19,580.39
New Democratic	Michelene Gray	2,796	24.49	+10.11	$2,811.15
Green	Tyler Colbourne	224	1.96	–	$0.00
Total valid votes/expense limit		11,419	98.80	-0.77	104,476.76
Total rejected ballots		139	1.20	-0.78	
Turnout		11,558	57.26	-4.73	
Eligible voters		20,184			
Liberal hold		Swing		-23.24	
Source: Elections Canada

2015 Canadian federal election: Labrador
Party	Candidate	Votes	%	±%	Expenditures
Liberal	Yvonne Jones	8,878	71.75	+23.76	–
New Democratic	Edward Rudkowski	1,779	14.38	–4.81	–
Conservative	Peter Penashue	1,716	13.87	–18.53	–
Total valid votes/Expense limit		12,373	100.0		$204,293.51
Total rejected ballots		53	0.43	–0.42	
Turnout		12,426	62.39	+4.40	
Eligible voters		19,917			
Liberal hold		Swing		+14.28	
Source: Elections Canada

Canadian federal by-election, 13 May 2013: Labrador Resignation of Peter Penashue, 14 March 2013
Party	Candidate	Votes	%	±%	Expenditures
Liberal	Yvonne Jones	5,812	47.99	+8.92	$76,859.63
Conservative	Peter Penashue	3,924	32.40	−7.41	$70,866.91
New Democratic	Harry Borlase	2,324	19.19	−0.64	$81,475.53
Libertarian	Norman Andrews	50	0.41		$236.16
Total valid votes/expense limit		12,110	100.0	–	$ 89,852.84
Total rejected, declined and unmarked ballots		27	0.22	−0.26	
Turnout		12,137	59.93	+6.49	
Eligible voters		20,251			
Liberal gain from Conservative		Swing		+8.17	
Source: "By-election May 13, 2013". Elections Canada. May 13, 2013.

=== Provincial ===
2011 Newfoundland and Labrador general election
Party	Candidate	Votes	%	±%
Liberal	Yvonne Jones	1,516	71.14	-1.74
Progressive Conservative	Glen Acreman	571	26.79	-0.33
NDP	Bill Cooper	44	2.06	
Total valid votes		2,131	100.0	
Difference		945	44.35	
Total rejected ballots		2	0.09	
Turnout		2,133	67.87	
Liberal hold		Swing		-1.58

2007 Newfoundland and Labrador general election
Party	Candidate	Votes	%	±%
Liberal	Yvonne Jones	1,736	72.88%	+12.90%
Progressive Conservative	Dennis Normore	646	27.12%	-4.73%

2003 Newfoundland and Labrador general election
Party	Candidate	Votes	%	±%
Liberal	Yvonne Jones	1,514	59.98%	-25.47%
Progressive Conservative	Dennis Normore	804	31.85%	+17.30%
Labrador	Frank Pye	206	8.16%	+8.16%

1999 Newfoundland and Labrador general election
Party	Candidate	Votes	%	±%
Liberal	Yvonne Jones	1,832	85.45%	+43.37%
Progressive Conservative	Sharon Moores	312	14.55%	+13.12%

1996 Newfoundland and Labrador general election
Party	Candidate	Votes	%	±%
Independent	Yvonne Jones	1,665	56.83%	
Liberal	Danny Dumaresque	1,233	42.08%	
Progressive Conservative	Berkley Bursey	42	1.43%	–
