= Trevor Taylor (politician) =

Canadian politician

The Honourable Trevor Taylor ECNL

Member of the Newfoundland and Labrador House of Assembly for The Straits - White Bay North
- In office 2001–2009
- Preceded by: Brian Tobin
- Succeeded by: Marshall Dean

Minister of Fisheries and Aquaculture, And Minister Responsible for Labrador Affairs
- In office November 6, 2003 – November 8, 2005
- Preceded by: Yvonne Jones
- Succeeded by: Tom Rideout

Minister of Innovation, Trade, Business And Rural Development, And Minister Responsible for the Rural Secretariat
- In office May 18, 2006 – October 31, 2008
- Preceded by: Kathy Dunderdale
- Succeeded by: Shawn Skinner

Minister of Transportation and Works, And Minister Responsible for the NL Housing Corporation
- In office October 31, 2008 – September 24, 2009
- Preceded by: Dianne Whalen
- Succeeded by: Tom Hedderson

Personal details
- Party: Conservative Party of Canada, Progressive Conservative (2001–present)
- Other political affiliations: New Democratic Party (Before 2001)
- Occupation: Fisherman

Trevor Taylor is a Canadian politician. He formerly represented the riding of The Straits - White Bay North in the Newfoundland and Labrador House of Assembly. He was a member of the Progressive Conservatives.

Prior to entering politics, Taylor worked as a fisherman, and later staff member of the FFAW (fishermens' union).

He has served as Minister of Transportation and Works, Minister of Innovation, Trade and Rural Development, and Acting Minister of Fisheries & Aquaculture (a post he held after the 2003 provincial election).

On September 24, 2009, Taylor announced that he had resigned as Minister of Transportation and Works, and that on October 2, 2009, he would resign as an MHA. He told reporters he was leaving for personal reasons, that he still fully supported the government of Danny Williams, and was not leaving because of any internal conflict.

In March 2011, with the announcement of a federal election, Taylor was nominated to represent the Conservative Party of Canada in Humber—St. Barbe—Baie Verte. He was defeated by incumbent Liberal MP Gerry Byrne, receiving 7,519 votes. Taylor had previously challenged Byrne, unsuccessfully contesting the riding as a New Democrat during the 2000 federal election receiving 8,173 votes.

== Electoral record ==
2011 Canadian federal election
| Party | Candidate | Votes | % | ±% | Expenditures |
|---|---|---|---|---|---|
| Liberal | Gerry Byrne | 17,119 | 57.11 | – | |
| Conservative | Trevor Taylor | 7,519 | 25.09 | – | |
| New Democratic | Shelley Senior | 4,751 | 15.85 | – | |
| Independent | Wayne Ronald Bennett | 332 | 1.11 | – | |
| Green | Robin Gosse | 253 | 0.84 | – | |
| Total valid votes/Expense limit | | 29,974 | 100.00 | – | |
| Turnout | | – | 50.7 | – | – |

The Straits - White Bay North, 2007 Newfoundland and Labrador general election
| Party | Candidate | Votes | % | ±% |
|---|---|---|---|---|
| Progressive Conservative | Trevor Taylor | 2,651 | 63.42% | +0.92% |
| Liberal | Boyd Noel | 1,358 | 32.49% | -3.46% |
| NDP | Gerry Ryall | 171 | 4.09% | +2.53% |

The Straits - White Bay North, 2003 Newfoundland and Labrador general election
| Party | Candidate | Votes | % | ±% |
|---|---|---|---|---|
| Progressive Conservative | Trevor Taylor | 3133 | 62.50% | – |
| Liberal | Don McDonald | 1802 | 35.95% | |
| Independent | Ford Michelmore | 78 | 1.56% | |

Humber-St. Barbe-Baie Verte, Canadian Federal Election, 2000
| Party | Candidate | Votes | % | ±% |
|---|---|---|---|---|
| Liberal | Gerry Byrne | 15,446 | 48.79 | +8.95 |
| New Democratic | Trevor Taylor | 8,173 | 25.82 | +11.22 |
| Progressive Conservative | Peter McBreairty | 6,340 | 20.03 | -19.03 |
| Alliance | Murdock Cole | 1,698 | 5.33 | -1.17 |
