= John Crosbie =

Canadian politician (1931–2020)

The Honourable John Crosbie PC OC ONL QC
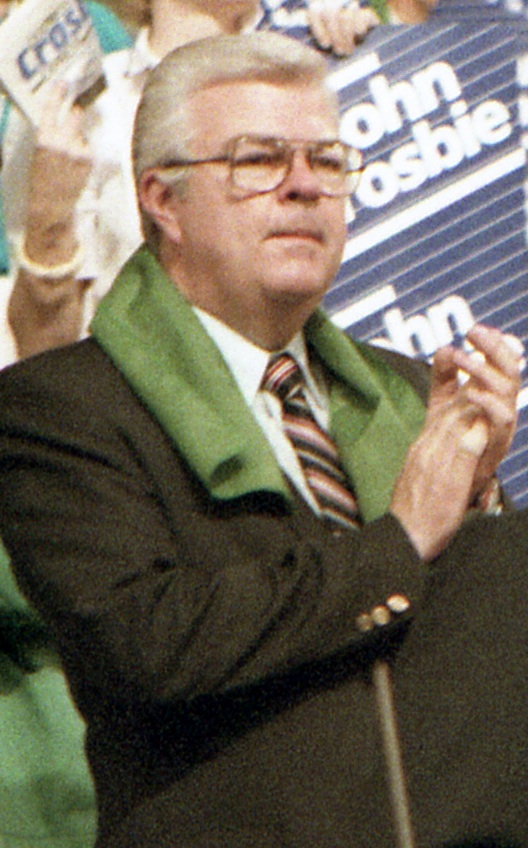
- Crosbie in 1983

12th Lieutenant Governor of Newfoundland and Labrador
- In office February 4, 2008 – March 19, 2013
- Monarch: Elizabeth II
- Governors General: Michaëlle Jean; David Johnston
- Premier: Danny Williams; Kathy Dunderdale
- Preceded by: Edward Roberts
- Succeeded by: Frank Fagan

5th Chancellor of Memorial University of Newfoundland
- In office 1994–2008
- Preceded by: Paul Desmarais
- Succeeded by: Rick Hillier

Minister of Fisheries and Oceans
- In office April 21, 1991 – June 24, 1993
- Prime Minister: Brian Mulroney
- Preceded by: Bernard Valcourt
- Succeeded by: Ross Reid

Minister of International Trade
- In office March 31, 1988 – April 20, 1991
- Prime Minister: Brian Mulroney
- Preceded by: Pat Carney
- Succeeded by: Michael Wilson

Minister of Transport
- In office June 30, 1986 – March 30, 1988
- Prime Minister: Brian Mulroney
- Preceded by: Don Mazankowski
- Succeeded by: Benoît Bouchard

Minister of Justice
- In office September 17, 1984 – June 29, 1986
- Prime Minister: Brian Mulroney
- Preceded by: Donald Johnston
- Succeeded by: Ray Hnatyshyn

Minister of Finance
- In office June 4, 1979 – March 3, 1980
- Prime Minister: Joe Clark
- Preceded by: Jean Chrétien
- Succeeded by: Allan MacEachen

Member of Parliament for St. John's West
- In office October 18, 1976 – October 25, 1993
- Preceded by: Walter C. Carter
- Succeeded by: Jean Payne

Member of the Newfoundland and Labrador House of Assembly for St. John's West
- In office September 8, 1966 – September 4, 1976
- Preceded by: William G. Adams
- Succeeded by: Hubert Kitchen

Personal details
- Born: John Carnell Crosbie; January 30, 1931 St. John's, Dominion of Newfoundland
- Died: January 10, 2020 (aged 88) St. John's, Newfoundland and Labrador, Canada
- Resting place: General Protestant Cemetery, St. John's, Newfoundland and Labrador
- Party: Conservative; Progressive Conservative (1969–2003); Liberal (1966–1969)
- Spouse: Jane Ellen Furneaux (m. 1952)
- Children: 3, including Ches
- Parents: Chesley Crosbie (father); Jessie Carnell (mother)
- Relatives: Sir John Chalker Crosbie (grandfather)
- Education: Queen's University; Dalhousie Law School
- Profession: Lawyer, Politician

John Carnell Crosbie PC OC ONL QC (January 30, 1931 – January 10, 2020) was a Canadian provincial and federal politician who served as the 12th lieutenant governor of Newfoundland and Labrador, Canada. Prior to being lieutenant governor, he served as a provincial cabinet minister under Premiers Joey Smallwood and Frank Moores as well as a federal cabinet minister during the Progressive Conservative (PC) governments of Joe Clark and Brian Mulroney. Crosbie held several federal cabinet posts, including minister of finance, minister of justice, minister of transport, minister of international trade, and minister of fisheries and oceans.

Crosbie was best known for his outspoken, blunt, and controversial rhetoric. However, at the same time he was seen as a leader of the social liberal wing of the PC Party. He advocated for gay and lesbian rights and was pro-choice regarding abortion as far back as when he was federal Minister of Justice.

Crosbie ran unsuccessfully for the leadership of the Liberal Party of Newfoundland and Labrador in 1969, losing to Smallwood, and was also a candidate in the Progressive Conservative Party of Canada's 1983 leadership election, placing third.

== Early life ==
Born in the pre-confederation St. John's, Newfoundland. He was the son of Jessie (Carnell) and Chesley Crosbie, and grandson of Sir John Chalker Crosbie. His father was leader of the Economic Union Party in the 1940s and a leading opponent of the campaign for Newfoundland to join Canadian Confederation. His grandfather served briefly as Prime Minister of the Dominion.

Crosbie's early education was in local schools and at St. Andrew's College, Aurora, Ontario. He went on to study political science and economics at Queen's University, Kingston, Ontario, where he graduated with first-class honours and won the University Medal in political science.

Crosbie went on to study law at Dalhousie Law School in Halifax, Nova Scotia graduating in 1956 as the University Medalist in Law. He was awarded the Viscount Bennett Scholarship by the Canadian Bar Association as the outstanding law student for that year. He undertook postgraduate studies at the Institute for Advanced Legal Studies of the University of London and the London School of Economics in 1956-1957, and was called to the Newfoundland Bar in 1957. He was awarded an honorary Doctor of Laws Degree by Dalhousie University in May 1984.

== Local and provincial political career ==
Crosbie first entered politics as a councillor of the St. John's City Council in 1965, and was briefly deputy mayor in 1966. He served on council until he was appointed to the provincial cabinet of Liberal Premier Joey Smallwood in 1966. Crosbie was sworn in as Minister of Municipal and Housing, and soon after won a seat in the House of Assembly. As Minister he was responsible for the creation of the Newfoundland and Labrador Housing Corporation.

In 1967, Crosbie became Minister of Health and was instrumental in creating the Newfoundland Medicare Commission and the framework for the Newfoundland Medicare Plan. Smallwood's government had been in power since 1949, and the Premier was trying to rejuvenate his cabinet by bringing in new blood. Smallwood's authoritarian style and refusal to allow a younger generation to take power frustrated Crosbie and other young ministers, such as Clyde Wells. In protest of a deal Smallwood wanted to make with American industrialist John Shaheen over an oil refinery at Come By Chance, Crosbie and Wells resigned from the caucus to sit as Reform Liberals, while remaining members of the Liberal Party.

In 1969, Smallwood announced his retirement from politics. However, when Crosbie, who had resigned from caucus, became the apparent front runner to succeed him as leader Smallwood decided to run for the leadership of the party. Smallwood won the leadership race and Crosbie crossed the floor to join the opposition Progressive Conservative Party, led by Frank Moores.

The Progressive Conservatives were now seen as a viable alternative to the Liberal Party, and in 1972 Crosbie helped the Tories defeat Smallwood and come to power. In Moore's government Crosbie held the portfolios of Minister of Finance, President of the Treasury Board, and Minister of Economic Development; Minister of Fisheries and Minister of Intergovernmental Affairs; Minister of Mines and Energy; and Government House Leader. He left provincial politics in 1976 to enter federal politics.

== Federal political career ==
Crosbie won the seat of St. John's West in the House of Commons of Canada in a by-election on October 18, 1976 as a candidate for the Progressive Conservative Party of Canada, which was in Opposition at the time.

=== Finance Minister under Clark ===
When Joe Clark's Progressive Conservatives formed a minority government after the 1979 general election, Crosbie was appointed Minister of Finance. He presented a tough budget that included tax increases in what Crosbie quipped was "short term pain for long term gain." A motion of no confidence on the budget brought the Clark government down on December 13, 1979, resulting in a new election which the Tories lost. Clark's government would last a total of nine months less a day. Crosbie famously described it as: "Long enough to conceive, just not long enough to deliver."

=== Leadership bid ===
Though a leadership convention was not called following their defeat at the polls, Crosbie felt that a convention would be held in the near future. In 1981, he quietly organized a team for his prospective leadership bid, while making sure not to undermine Clark's leadership. At a leadership review held at the party's general meeting, in Winnipeg, in 1983, 66.9% of delegates voted against holding a leadership convention. Clark felt however that this was not a strong mandate and recommended that the party executive hold a leadership convention at the earliest possible time, in which he would be a candidate.

A leadership convention was called for later that year, and Crosbie announced his candidacy. At the convention he placed third behind Brian Mulroney and Clark on all three ballots. While Crosbie may have been the most popular of the candidates, he was hurt by his inability to speak French. His response that he did not know how to speak Chinese either was not well received. Less notable was the failure of the "John Crosbie blimp" to operate properly during his campaign's demonstration on the floor of the convention.

=== Mulroney cabinet ===
Liberal Prime Minister Pierre Trudeau retired as his party's leader in 1984 and was replaced by John Turner. Mulroney subsequently defeated Turner by leading the Tories to power in the 1984 federal election. Crosbie was named Minister of Justice in Mulroney's first cabinet. In 1985, while justice minister, he attracted attention when, in a heated moment during parliamentary debate, he told Liberal Member of Parliament Sheila Copps "Just quiet down, baby," prompting Copps to respond, "I'm nobody's baby."

In 1986, he was named Minister of Transport. A lifelong supporter of free trade with the United States, in cabinet he was one of the strongest proponents of the Canada-U.S. Free Trade Agreement. He became Minister for International Trade in 1988, shortly after the free trade agreement was negotiated. Crosbie actively promoted the agreement in that year's federal election, which was primarily fought on the issue. Crosbie was also a supporter of redress for Japanese Canadians interned during World War Two - in September 1988 the Mulroney government made its historic apology in the House of Commons and compensated each surviving internee with $18,000.

In 1990, Crosbie proposed the creation of the World Trade Organization (WTO). Crosbie was proud of his baby; in his autobiography he writes:

The WTO came into being at the end of 1993. It's a great achievement, a Canadian achievement. It was my initiative and I'm proud of my success.

At a fundraising dinner in Victoria, British Columbia in 1990, Crosbie took another dig at Sheila Copps by saying that she made him think of the song lyrics, "Pass the Tequila, Sheila, and lay down and love me again," a comment he subsequently acknowledged was ill-considered. He would later again rankle feminists and progressives with his recurring references, in the late 1980s and early 1990s (during the 34th Canadian Parliament), to the "Four Horsewomen of the Apocalypse", in reference to Copps, fellow MPs Dawn Black, Mary Clancy, and National Action Committee on the Status of Women President Judy Rebick.

He later said he and Copps played up their squabbles for mutual gain. “She's a professional politician, and I was as well,” he said in 2011. “We're good pals now. We're very friendly, and she's married to a Newfoundlander, so she's a fine woman as far as I'm concerned.” After Crosbie's death was announced, Copps called Crosbie "a great Canadian", writing that "His contributions to the province and the country he loved will be long remembered."

In contrast to his often politically incorrect comments, Crosbie was often a social liberal in practice. He was pro-abortion on the issue of abortion and as Minister of Justice, liberalized divorce laws, and appointed a larger percentage of women to the bench than his predecessors. He was also an early advocate of gay and lesbian rights, changing government policy to prohibit discrimination against homosexuals in hiring in the public sector, including the military and the RCMP, and in 1986 introduced amendments to the Canadian Human Rights Code to include sexual orientation as a prohibited grounds of discrimination. He was forced to withdraw the legislation due to the opposition of the Conservative caucus. In the 1988 federal election when Newfoundland Conservatives opposed the candidacy of Ross Reid due to his refusal to deny rumours that he was gay, Crosbie angrily told a meeting of party workers "I don't care if he is having sexual relations with effing cats. He's a fine man and he's our candidate...I'm supporting Ross 100 per cent.

Crosbie's final cabinet post in the Mulroney government was Minister of Fisheries and Oceans. On July 1, 1992 Crosbie visited Bay Bulls, Newfoundland and Labrador to celebrate Canada Day. Crosbie was greeted by an angry throng of Newfoundlanders concerned about rumours of a proposed moratorium on the Atlantic northwest cod fishery. He famously yelled out, "I didn't take the fish from the goddamn water, so don't go abusing me."

He oversaw the decision to close the cod fishery industry in Atlantic Canada due to the collapse of cod stocks. Crosbie called this decision, which put some 35,000 Newfoundlanders out of work, the hardest political moment of his life.

When Brian Mulroney announced his resignation as party leader, Crosbie did not stand as a candidate at the 1993 Progressive Conservative leadership convention but supported Jean Charest's candidacy instead. He declined an offer to serve in the cabinet of Mulroney's successor, Kim Campbell, when she became prime minister and did not run for re-election in the 1993 federal election, retiring from federal politics.

== Life after politics ==
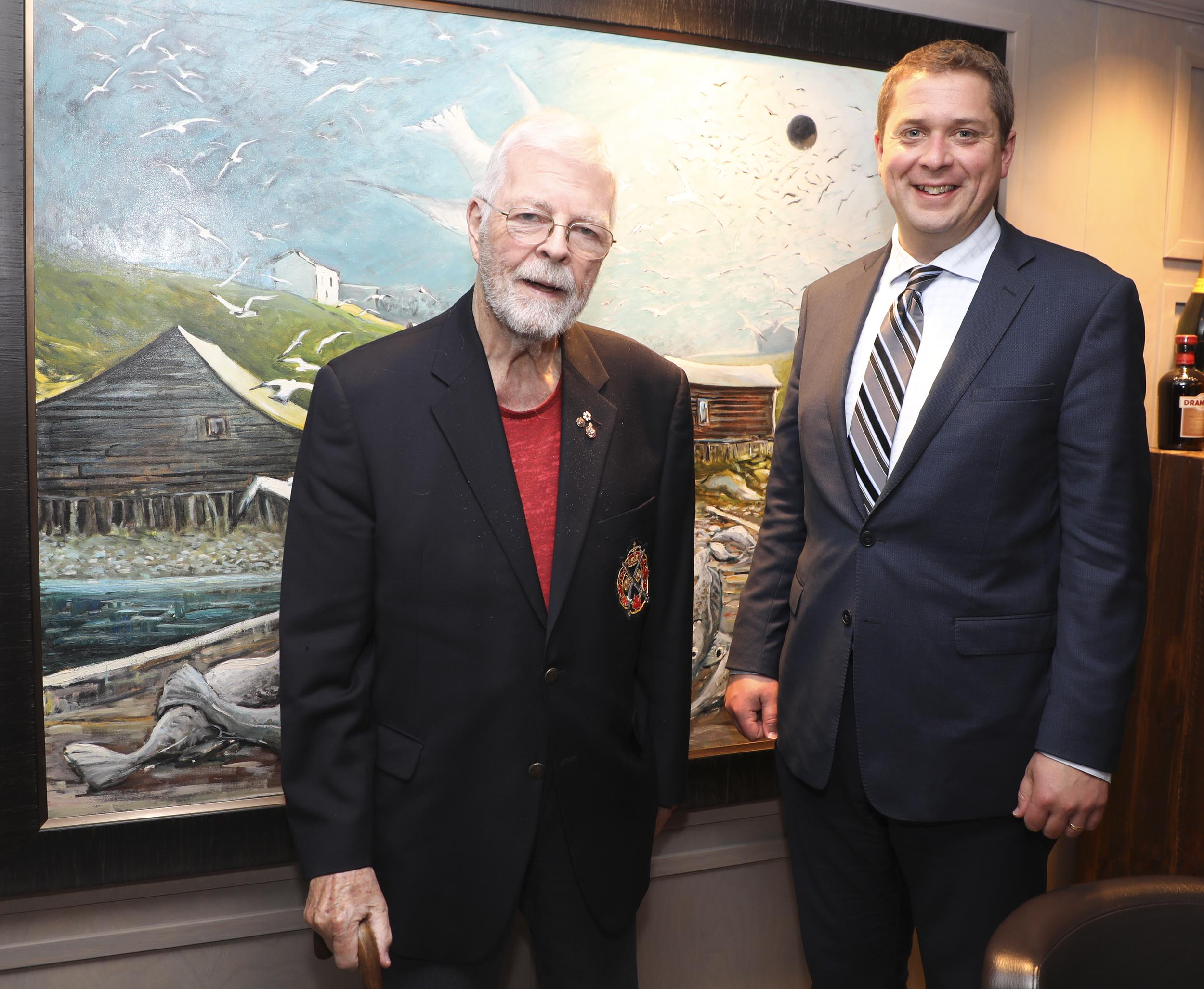
Crosbie with federal Conservative Leader Andrew Scheer at an event in St. John's in 2017.

In 1997, he published his memoirs, entitled No Holds Barred: My Life in Politics (ISBN 0-7710-2427-4). Around this time, the feud between him and Copps had also cooled. Crosbie had devoted an entire chapter in his autobiography to his confrontations with Copps. In her second autobiography, Worth Fighting For, Copps had Crosbie write an introduction in which he says "I write this Introduction to her new book as a tribute to a feisty, sometimes ferocious, feminist protagonist, never shy or retiring but redoubtable political personality. She was a constant thorn in my side while she was in Opposition, but her marriage to my fellow Newfoundlander Austin Thorne has made her more serene and has calmed her sometimes volcanic and partisan excesses".

Crosbie remained in the Progressive Conservative Party until its dissolution in 2003. Despite his earlier opposition to the Canadian Alliance, he did not oppose the merger of the two parties and joined the new Conservative Party of Canada. In 2004, he served as an advisor to Tony Clement's unsuccessful campaign for the leadership of the new party. In the 2004 federal election, he publicly considered running for the Conservatives against Liberal incumbent John Efford in the Newfoundland riding of Avalon, but ultimately decided against doing so.

From 1994 until 2008, he served as Chancellor of Memorial University of Newfoundland. In 1998, he was made an Officer of the Order of Canada. Crosbie continued to practise law with the law firm of Cox & Palmer in St. John's until his appointment as Lieutenant Governor.

=== Lieutenant governor ===
On February 4, 2008, Governor General Michaëlle Jean, on the advice of Prime Minister Stephen Harper, appointed John Crosbie as Lieutenant Governor of Newfoundland and Labrador, succeeding Edward Roberts. As lieutenant governor, Crosbie drew criticism for wearing a sealskin coat to several official events during Prince Charles' and Camilla, Duchess of Cornwall's tour of Newfoundland in November 2009 and for saying that the coat was a statement in support of the annual seal hunt. He was succeeded by Frank Fagan in 2013.

=== 2015 federal election ===
John's son, Ches Crosbie, was rejected as a federal Conservative Party of Canada candidate in the 2015 Canadian federal election, the party citing his performance in a play held by a local bar association that touched on the Canadian senate scandal. John Crosbie then accused the federal Conservatives of squashing his son's candidacy because he was too independent and because Newfoundland senator David Wells wanted to keep his control over Newfoundland patronage appointments, an accusation that Wells denied.

== Personal life and death ==
Crosbie married Jane Ellen Furneaux on September 8, 1952, and they remained married for the rest of his life. His eldest son, Ches Crosbie, is a lawyer and former politician. Ches was elected leader of the Progressive Conservative Party of Newfoundland and Labrador on April 28, 2018 serving until March 31, 2021. His younger son, Michael Crosbie, is a lawyer with McInnis Cooper in St. John's. His daughter, Beth Crosbie, is a former real estate agent, and was a candidate in the 2015 and 2019 provincial elections.

Crosbie died in St. John's on January 10, 2020, after a period of declining health. Former Prime Minister Brian Mulroney eulogized him in glowing terms at his state funeral:

If a PM of Canada is lucky—and I mean really lucky—he will wind up with a John Crosbie in his cabinet. One. Not two. As I sat across the cabinet table from John for nine years and watched him in action, I knew that as prime minister I had been handed a major gift.

== Honours and decorations ==
- John Crosbie was appointed to the Queen's Privy Council for Canada on 4 June 1979, giving him the accordant style of The Honourable and the Post Nominal Letters "PC" for life.
- On 6 May 1998, John Crosbie was appointed an Officer of the Order of Canada giving him the post nominal letters "OC" for life.
- He was given the Order of Newfoundland and Labrador upon being appointed Lieutenant Governor of Newfoundland and Labrador in 2008, giving him the post nominal letters "ONL" for life.
- Also upon his appointment as the Lieutenant Governor, he was made a Knight of Justice of the Order of St John.
- He received his Grant of Arms and Supporters on May 15, 2009.
- He was appointed a Queen's Counsel giving him the post nominal letters "QC" for life.

Decorations

- John Crosbie was awarded the Canadian Centennial Medal in 1967, while in provincial politics, the Canadian version of the Queen Elizabeth II Silver Jubilee Medal in 1977 and the 125th Anniversary of the Confederation of Canada Medal in 1992 as a sitting MP. He was given the Canadian version of the Queen Elizabeth II Golden Jubilee Medal in 2002 and the Canadian Version of the Queen Elizabeth II Diamond Jubilee Medal in 2012 for service to Canada.

Ribbon bars of John Crosbie

=== Coat of arms ===
Coat of arms of John Crosbie

Crest
A dexter mailed fist proper holding a Latin cross Or.
Escutcheon
Gules on a cross between in dexter chief and sinister base an escallop and in sinister chief and dexter base a mascle Or, a lymphad Sable its sail Argent its flags Gules.
Supporters
Two harp seals proper each charged on the shoulder with a torteau bearing a balance Or and standing on a carpet Vert
Motto
TENDO AD ASTRA
Orders
Order of Canada, Order of St. John and Order of Newfoundland and Labrador.

== Honorary degrees ==
John Crosbie has received many honorary degrees for his service to Canada. These include:

Honorary degrees
| Location | Date | School | Degree |
|---|---|---|---|
| Nova Scotia | May 1984 | Dalhousie University | Doctor of Laws (LL.D) |
| Newfoundland and Labrador | May 1999 | Memorial University of Newfoundland | Doctor of Laws (LL.D) |
| Nova Scotia | May 1999 | Cape Breton University | Doctor of Laws (LL.D) |
| Ontario | 2011 | Queen's University | Doctor of Laws (LL.D) |

== Memorable quotations ==
- "Why are you yelling at me? I didn't take the fish from the God damn water, so don't go abusing me."
- "They don't need to go berserk. Trying to batter on doors to frighten me. In the first place, I don't frighten." (Referring to protesters outside of his press conference on the Cod moratorium.)
- "Americans were far more popular in Newfoundland than Canadians, so I was never hung up about the United States. There's always seemed to be a hang up with the Toronto cultural literati about the US. But that's never been the feeling in Newfoundland and Atlantic Canada."
- "Someday we're going to have a North American continent that's an economic union. That's inevitable. These economic forces are there, and government policy can't stop them. It's only a question of, How do you get into a more secure position? They're next door and geography dictates. Like it or not, we're going up or down with the US."
- "No, and I'm goddamned not going to either! I'll tell you that, and I'm telling you that there isn't one person in the whole goddamn government who's read it. I'm the only one honest enough to say so ... At this stage of my life I don't have to kiss anybody's ass, I can say what I goddamn well like." (On reading the 1987 Free-Trade Agreement)
- "It is better to be honest and sincere in one language than a twister, a trickster and a twit in two." (referring to his own unilingualism and Trudeau's bilingualism)
- "No, I don't speak Mandarin Chinese either." (his response when asked if not speaking French would hinder his ability to be Prime Minister)
- "The Canadian economy needs a transfusion and who do they give us, Dracula." (reference to the appointment of Marc Lalonde as Canada's new Finance Minister, 1982)
- "The Hon. leader of the Opposition knows all about butts. He has had his hands on more butts than there are members of this House." (to Turner's 1984 election campaign gaffe on TV when he was caught slapping Liberal MP's Iona Campagnolo's buttocks.)

== Archives ==
There is a John Crosbie fonds at Library and Archives Canada.

24th Canadian Ministry (1984–1993) – Cabinet of Brian Mulroney
Cabinet posts (5)
| Predecessor | Office | Successor |
|---|---|---|
| Elmer MacKay | Minister for the Atlantic Canada Opportunities Agency; 1991–1993 | Ross Reid |
| Bernard Valcourt | Minister of Fisheries and Oceans; 1991–1993 | Ross Reid |
| Pat Carney | Minister of International Trade; 1988–1991 | Michael Wilson |
| Don Mazankowski | Minister of Transport; 1986–1988 | Benoît Bouchard |
| Donald Johnston | Minister of Justice; 1984–1986 | Ray Hnatyshyn |
21st Canadian Ministry (1979–1980) – Cabinet of Joe Clark
Cabinet post (1)
| Predecessor | Office | Successor |
| Jean Chrétien | Minister of Finance; 1979–1980 | Allan MacEachen |
Academic offices
| Preceded by Paul Desmarais | Chancellor of Memorial University of Newfoundland; 1994–2008 | Succeeded by Rick Hillier |
