= The Straits – White Bay North =

Former provincial electoral district in Newfoundland and Labrador, Canada

Newfoundland and Labrador electoral district
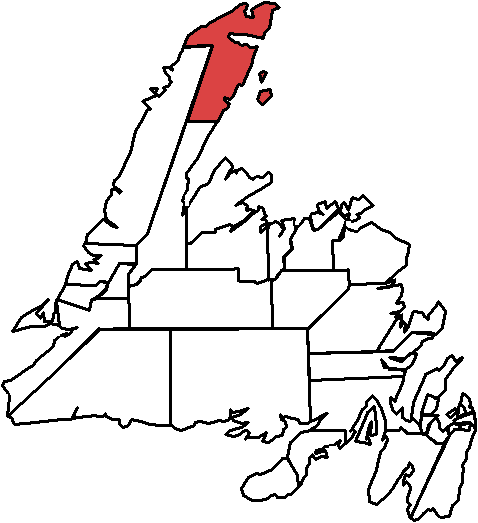
- The Straits – White Bay North in relation to other districts in Newfoundland

Defunct provincial electoral district
- Legislature: Newfoundland and Labrador House of Assembly
- Last contested: 2011

Demographics
- Population (2011): 8,218
- Electors (2011): 6,851

The Straits – White Bay North is a defunct provincial electoral district for the House of Assembly of Newfoundland and Labrador, Canada. The district was known as Strait of Belle Isle prior to the 1996 election. In the 2007 redistribution, it added five per cent of St. Barbe. As of 2011, there are 6,851 eligible voters living within the district.

The main communities include St. Anthony, Conche, Roddickton, Griquet and Quirpon. District also includes communities of Bide Arm, Big Brook, Cape Norman, Cook's Harbour, Croque, Eddie's Cove, Englee, Flower's Cove, Great Brehat, Green Island Brook, Green Island Cove, Goose Cove, Goose Cove East, Hay Cove, Lower Cove, Main Brook, Nameless Cove, Noddy Bay, North Boat Harbour, North East Crouse, Pine Cove, Raleigh, St. Anthony Bight, St. Carol's, St. Julien's, St. Lunaire-Griquet, Sandy Cove, Save Cove, Ship Cove-Cape Onion, and Wild Bight.

The district was abolished in 2015 and replaced by St. Barbe-L'Anse aux Meadows.

== Members of the House of Assembly ==
The district has elected the following members of the House of Assembly

Member	Party	Term
Christopher Mitchelmore	Liberal	2014–2015
Christopher Mitchelmore	Independent	2013–2014
Christopher Mitchelmore	NDP	2011–2013
Marshall Dean	Liberal	2009–2011
Trevor Taylor	Progressive Conservative	2001–2009
Brian Tobin	Liberal	1999–2000
Chris Decker	Liberal	1985–1999
Ed Roberts	Liberal	1966–1985
Walter Carter	Liberal	1962–1966
C. Maxwell Lane	Liberal	1956–1962

=== White Bay ===
Member	Party	Term
Samuel Drover	Liberal	1949—1956

== Election results ==
2011 Newfoundland and Labrador general election
Party	Candidate	Votes	%	±%
NDP	Christopher Mitchelmore	1,537	36.74	+28.81
Liberal	Marshall Dean	1,327	31.71	-15.87
Progressive Conservative	Selma Pike	1,320	31.55	-12.92

}

By-election, October 27, 2009 On the resignation of Trevor Taylor, October 2, 2009
Party	Candidate	Votes	%	±%
Liberal	Marshall Dean	1,925	47.58	+15.09
Progressive Conservative	Rick Pelley	1,799	44.47	-18.95
NDP	Dale Colbourne	321	7.93	+3.84

2007 Newfoundland and Labrador general election
Party	Candidate	Votes	%	±%
Progressive Conservative	Trevor Taylor	2,651	63.42	+0.92
Liberal	Boyd Noel	1,358	32.49	-3.46
NDP	Gerry Ryall	171	4.09	+2.53

2003 Newfoundland and Labrador general election
Party		Candidate	Votes	%	±%
	Progressive Conservative	Trevor Taylor	3,133	62.50	–
	Liberal	Don McDonald	1,802	35.95	
}	Independent	Ford Mitchelmore	78	1.56	

}

By-election, January 30, 2001 On the resignation of Brian Tobin, October 16, 2000
Party	Candidate	Votes	%	±%
Progressive Conservative	Trevor Taylor	2,590	–	–
Liberal	Ross Pilgrim	2,374		
Independent	Ford Mitchelmore	160		
NDP	Holly Patey	41		

1999 Newfoundland and Labrador general election
Party	Candidate	Votes	%	±%
Liberal	Brian Tobin	3,227	74.5	
Progressive Conservative	Ford Mitchelmore	1,089	25.1	–

== See also ==
- List of Newfoundland and Labrador provincial electoral districts
- Canadian provincial electoral districts
