= Marshall Dean =

Canadian politician and businessman

Member of the Newfoundland and Labrador House of Assembly
- In office November 24, 2009 – September 19, 2011
- Preceded by: Trevor Taylor
- Succeeded by: Chris Mitchelmore
- Constituency: The Straits – White Bay North

Personal details
- Party: Liberal
- Occupation: Businessman (President/Owner of Canada Ice Enterprises)

Marshall Dean is a Canadian politician and businessman. He represented the district of The Straits – White Bay North in the Newfoundland and Labrador House of Assembly, as a member of the Liberal Party. Dean won his seat in a by-election in October 2009, after the resignation of Cabinet Minister Trevor Taylor; he was not re-elected in the 2011 provincial election.

On March 30, 2010, Dean was ejected from the provincial legislature during question period for unparliamentary language. He used the unparliamentary language while accusing the Progressive Conservative government of punishing voters in his district for electing a Liberal MHA.

In March 2010, he criticized the government for moving air ambulance services from St. Anthony to Labrador.

In 2012, Dean's business, Canada Ice Enterprises (known for bottled iceberg water 80 Degrees North), declared bankruptcy.

== Electoral record ==
2011 Newfoundland and Labrador general election
Party	Candidate	Votes	%	±%
New Democratic	Chris Mitchelmore	1,537	36.74%	+28.81
Liberal	Marshall Dean	1,327	31.71%	-15.87
Progressive Conservative	Selma Pike	1,320	31.55%	-12.92

}

The Straits – White Bay North, By-election, October 27, 2009 On the resignation of Trevor Taylor, October 2, 2009
Party	Candidate	Votes	%	±%
Liberal	Marshall Dean	1,925	47.58%	
Progressive Conservative	Rick Pelley	1,799	44.47%	–
New Democratic	Dale Colbourne	321	7.93%	
