= Liberal Party of Newfoundland and Labrador =

Provincial political party in Canada

- Leader: John Hogan
- President: John Whelan
- Founded: 1948; 78 years ago
- Preceded by: Confederate Association
- Headquarters: Suite 205, Beothuk Building; 20 Crosbie Place; St. John's, Newfoundland and Labrador, Canada
- Membership (2025): 13,844
- Ideology: Liberalism (Canadian); Factions: Blue Grits
- Political position: Centre
- National affiliation: Liberal Party of Canada (informal)
- Colours: Red
- House of Assembly: 15 / 40

Website
- Official website

The Liberal Party of Newfoundland and Labrador is a political party in the province of Newfoundland and Labrador, Canada. It is one of the three parties currently represented in the Newfoundland and Labrador House of Assembly, and one of two that had continual representation since Newfoundland became a province of Canada. It has formed the Government of Newfoundland and Labrador for over 60% of time period since Newfoundland joined the Canadian Confederation as its tenth provinces in 1949 and produced eight of the province's fifteen premiers.

== History ==
=== Origins ===
The party originated in 1948 as the Newfoundland Confederate Association. At this time, Newfoundland was being governed by a Commission of Government appointed by the Government of the United Kingdom. The NCA was an organization campaigning for Newfoundland to join Canadian Confederation. Joey Smallwood was the NCA's chief organizer and spokesman; Smallwood also led the winning side of the 1948 Newfoundland referendum on Confederation.

=== The Joey Smallwood era (1949–1972) ===
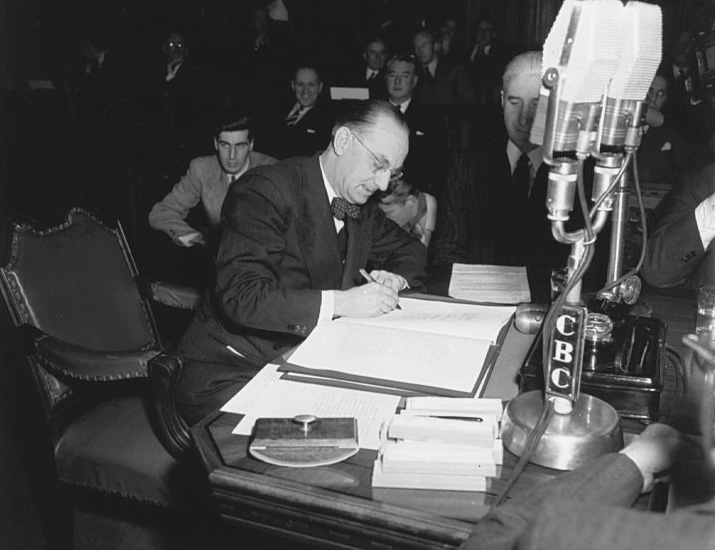
Joseph Smallwood signs the document bringing Newfoundland into Confederation

Following the referendum victory, the NCA reorganized itself as the new province's Liberal Party under Smallwood's leadership. It won the province's first post-Confederation election for the Newfoundland and Labrador House of Assembly held on May 27, 1949.

The Liberals under Smallwood promoted the diversification of the province's economy through various megaprojects. The provincial government invested in the construction of factories, the pulp and paper industry, the oil industry, hydro-electricity projects, the construction of highways and schools, the relocation of rural villages into larger centres, and other projects. These projects were often very expensive, and yielded few results.

Smallwood led the province virtually unchallenged for two decades, during which he never faced more than eight opposition MHAs. However, by the late 1960s, disaffection with Smallwood and his government mounted within the province. He had always had a somewhat autocratic bent, a tendency that increased during the 1960s. He tended to treat his ministers as extensions of his authority rather than colleagues.

In hopes of stemming the tide, Smallwood brought several younger Liberals into government during this time; however, this did little to rebuild his popularity. He announced his retirement in 1969, only to run in the ensuing leadership contest. Smallwood defeated John Crosbie, one of the younger ministers, for the leadership. Crosbie along with many young Liberals defected to the opposition Progressive Conservatives. The Progressive Conservatives had previously found support largely in the business community, and in and around St. John's.

The Liberals narrowly lost the 1971 election, but Smallwood refused to resign as Premier until January 1972 as the support of the Labrador Party's lone MHA resulted in a 21–21 tie in the House of Assembly for Smallwood's government. Frank Moores' Conservatives attempted to form government but its shaky hold on power resulted in the 1972 general election. This time, Smallwood's Liberals were conclusively defeated, falling to only nine seats.

Smallwood was forced out of the party, and formed his own Newfoundland Reform Liberal Party, which ran in the 1975 general election against the Liberals and the Tories. Due in part to massive vote-splitting, the Tories won 30 seats against 20 for the two Liberal factions combined (14 for the Liberals and 6 for the Reform Liberals). The Liberals were badly split and demoralized, and remained on the opposition benches until 1989.

=== The party under Clyde Wells (1987–1996) ===
In the 1989 provincial election, the Liberals returned to power under Clyde Wells, winning 31 of the 52 seats in the House of Assembly. Despite their majority win the Progressive Conservatives narrowly won the popular vote, winning 47.6% of the vote compared to 47.2 for the Liberals.

Under Wells, the Liberal government eschewed the megaprojects and spending of the Smallwood, Moores and Peckford eras in favour of an economic development program laid out in the Strategic Economic Plan. During a severe economic recession, the Wells administration introduced spending controls and reduced the size of the public service while at the same time maintaining social program spending and working to diversify and develop the economy. Wells rose to national prominence in early 1990 for his opposition to the Meech Lake constitutional Accord. In September 1990, Wells signed a development agreement for the Hibernia project, thereby laying the foundation for the province's oil and gas industry and future economic prosperity. When Wells retired in 1996, he was replaced by former federal Liberal cabinet minister Brian Tobin.

=== Tobin government (1996–2000) ===
In 1996, Tobin resigned from federal politics to succeed Clyde Wells as leader of the governing Liberal Party of Newfoundland and premier. The Liberal Party won a large majority government later that year. During his time as premier Tobin pursued tough negotiations with out-of-province companies seeking to export resources for refining and smelting elsewhere. He insisted that the resources will never be mined unless Newfoundlanders received secondary manufacturing and tertiary service spin-offs. A similar tough stance was taken in seeking to develop the Lower Churchill River, keeping in mind the contract his predecessor Joey Smallwood had negotiated. His Liberals won re-election in 1999.

It was also during this time in the lead-up to the millennium that Newfoundland undertook an aggressive tourism marketing campaign which focused on important anniversaries such as the 500th year since John Cabot's voyage of discovery (1997), as well as the 1000th year since Vikings, such as Leif Ericson, made landfall on the province's shores (2000).

Tobin returned to federal politics in 2000, after only four years as Premier.

==== 2001 leadership convention ====
Less than two years into his second mandate, Tobin announced his resignation as premier on October 16, 2000, to return to federal politics. Tobin's Deputy Premier Beaton Tulk was sworn in as his successor the same day and served as premier till a leadership convention could be held the new year. Minister of Health Roger Grimes, Fisheries Minister John Efford and Mines and Energy Minister Paul Dicks all announced their intentions to contest the February 2001 leadership race.

Grimes and Efford were the perceived frontrunners in the leadership race and were considered to be very different candidates with different strengths. Grimes was considered to be the candidate of the party establishment, he had a low-profile with a proven track record in several difficult portfolios. Efford on the other hand was a charismatic, populist politician whose outspokenness has caused some controversy. Efford's outspokenness alienated members of the establishment but won him the support of the party's grassroots.

After the first ballot at the convention no candidate won the 50 per cent required to be elected leader. Dicks was thus eliminated after finishing third and immediately threw his support behind Efford, hoping to defeat Grimes who had finished first on the ballot. Dicks' support was not enough and on the second ballot Grimes was elected leader; defeating Efford by 14 votes. The three-month race had included nasty and personal attacks between the candidates, and when Grimes was announced as the leader he received boos from Efford's supporters. Grimes was sworn in as Premier of Newfoundland and Labrador on February 13, 2001. While Efford had called for the party to unite behind Grimes at the leadership convention, Dicks left politics immediately while Efford turned down a cabinet post and resigned in May of that year to enter federal politics.

=== The party under Roger Grimes (2001–2005) ===
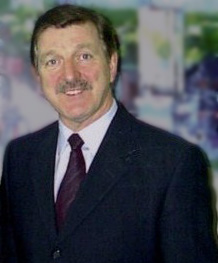
Roger Grimes, Premier from 2001 until 2003, leader until 2005

Grimes served as the province's eighth premier, from February 13, 2001 until November 6, 2003. The Liberals had been in power for 12 years when Grimes won the leadership; he attempted to reinvigorate the party by distancing himself from Tobin. A major priority for Grimes as premier was to re-open talks with the mining company Inco Ltd., who had proposed to build a nickel mine in northern Labrador. Talks had stalled under Tobin, who insisted the nickel from Labrador must be processed in the province. On June 11, 2002, Grimes' government reached a deal with Inco, six years after negotiations first began. Inco agreed to build a processing facility on Newfoundland, but the deal allowed for them to ship nickel to other facilities for processing before that facility was built.

In 2003, the federal government declared a moratorium on the last remaining cod fishery in Atlantic Canada in the Gulf of St. Lawrence. While Newfoundland and Labrador was again the most directly affected province by this decision, communities on Quebec's North Shore and in other parts of Atlantic Canada also faced difficulties.

Grimes called for a review of the Act of Union by which the province had become a part of Canada and on July 2, 2003, the findings of the Royal Commission on Renewing and Strengthening Our Place in Canada (which Grimes had created in 2002) were released. Critics called this inquiry the "Blame Canada Commission".

Grimes often clashed with the federal Liberal government of Jean Chrétien and became increasingly critical of his predecessor, Tobin. When Grimes accused the federal government of bias in the Gulf of St. Lawrence cod moratorium, many even in Newfoundland and Labrador saw him as stirring up unnecessary trouble for political gain. After the Royal Commission on Renewing and Strengthening Our Place in Canada, Grimes' popularity began to decline as his increasingly confrontational approach made it more difficult to win concessions from the federal government.

==== 2003 general election ====
By 2003, the Liberals had spent fourteen years in power under four different leaders. Public disaffection had mounted resulting in their electoral defeat by Danny Williams and the Tories. Grimes stayed on as Liberal leader until his retirement on May 30, 2005, when he was replaced, initially on an interim basis, by Gerry Reid.

Lawyer Jim Bennett was acclaimed party leader on February 6, 2006, after no other candidate came forward for the post. Bennett's leadership started causing rifts within the Liberal caucus after controversial policies statements and his reported abrasive leadership style. In April of that year Bennett was criticized by Reid, who was still serving as Opposition Leader, over his proposal to create a two-tier minimum wage based on age. On May 8, 2006, Bennett resigned as Liberal leader, just three months after being acclaimed to the position. Reid then resumed the leadership, now on a permanent basis, and lead the party into the next election.

=== In opposition (2005–2015) ===
==== 2007 general election ====
In the October 2007 provincial election, the Liberal Party's support fell to its lowest level since Confederation. The party won just three of the 48 seats in the House of Assembly. Reid resigned as leader after losing his seat, and Yvonne Jones was named interim leader.

==== Liberals under Yvonne Jones (2007–2011) ====
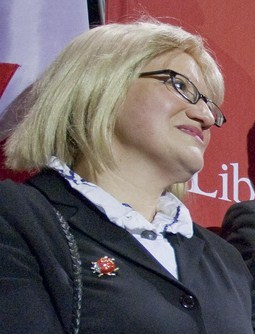
Yvonne Jones in 2011

With only three members re-elected following the 2007 general election, the party decided that Jones would stand as the party's leader on an interim basis, and therefore as the Official Opposition Leader in the House of Assembly. Jones became the first woman to serve as the leader of the Liberals and only the second woman to serve as Official Opposition Leader.

Seven by-elections have been held since Jones took over the leadership of the Liberal Party, each one to replace a Tory MHA. Six of the by-elections were won by a Progressive Conservative candidate and the Liberals won one. The by-election they won was held on October 27, 2009 in the district of The Straits - White Bay North. The by-election was held to replace Minister of Transportation and Works, Trevor Taylor, who resigned on October 2, 2009. Liberal candidate Marshall Dean squeaked out a win taking 1,975 votes compared to 1,799 for PC candidate Rick Pelley. The by-election was mostly focused on Premier Williams' plan to make cuts to rural health care in this area. He announced days before the by-election he would not make cuts to the district's rural health care after protests from residents.

===== May 2011 leadership election =====
A leadership convention was scheduled for the spring of 2008, but due to lack of interest in the leadership the convention was delayed. The convention was rescheduled for November 2010 with nominations closing on July 30, 2010. On July 9, 2010, Yvonne Jones officially submitted nomination papers, and with the close of nominations at the end of the month she was the only candidate to file nomination papers and was acclaimed leader. Jones announced weeks later she had breast cancer and the leadership election was postponed till May 2011. On May 25, 2011, she was sworn in as the permanent leader of the party.

==== Liberals under Aylward (2011–2012) ====
On August 9, 2011, Jones resigned as leader due to her health. That night the executive of the party decided the process of choosing the next leader, nominations for the leadership opened on August 10, 2011, and Kevin Aylward was chosen by the executive on August 14, 2011. Aylward led the party during the October 11, 2011, election. The campaigned on a platform that advocated for the creation of a legacy fund for offshore oil revenues, a new deal to develop the Lower Churchill hydroelectric development, annual increase to retired public service pensions, improve high-speed internet and cellphone service in rural areas, merge the Department of Business with the Department of Innovation, Trade, and Rural Development, establish a fisheries investment and diversification fund, creation of a fisheries loan board, initiate a judicial inquiry dealing with management of the fishery and operating a marine rescue subcentre in the province.

The party was unable to gain momentum under Aylward's leadership, after tying the NDP in opinion polls in May 2011, the Liberals fell to third place in polling during the election campaign. On election night the Progressive Conservatives won their third straight majority government. The Liberals placed third in the popular vote on election night, winning just 19.1 per cent of the vote. However, they managed to increase their number of seats to six and remain the Official Opposition. On October 26, 2011, Aylward announced his resignation as leader after failing to win the district of St. George's-Stephenville East in the election.

=== Liberals under Dwight Ball (2012–2020) ===
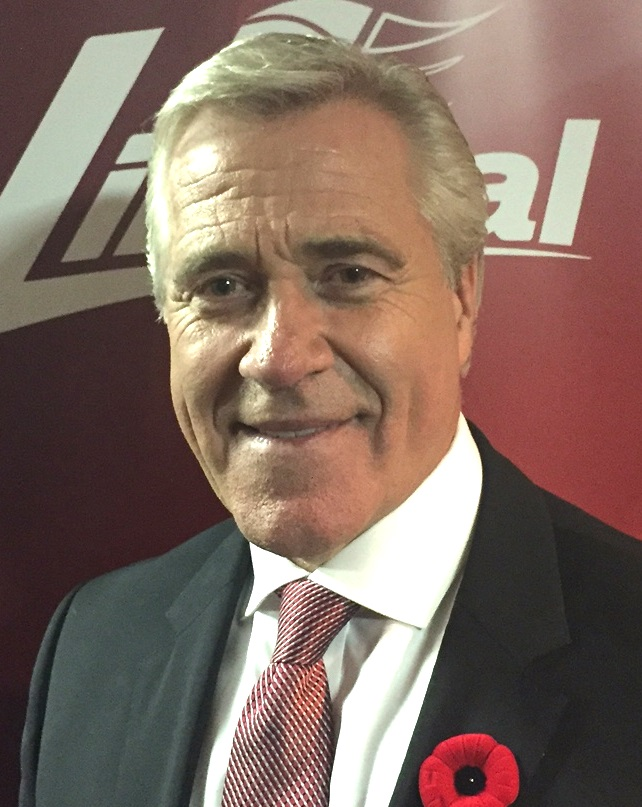
Dwight Ball, Premier from 2015 until 2020, leader 2013-2020

In December 2011, the party announced that Humber Valley MHA Dwight Ball would assume the role as Leader of the Official Opposition and interim leader of the Liberal Party on January 3, 2012. The Party announced in May 2012, that their next leadership election will occur between November 15 and 17, 2013. On July 18, 2013 Bay of Islands MHA Eddie Joyce was named Leader of the Opposition replacing Dwight Ball who resigned to run for the leadership permanently in the 2013 convention.

In the 2015 general election, the Tories lost their majority to the Liberals making their government the shortest in the province's history since joining Canada (it lasted from 2003 to 2015, 12 years). The party won every by-election in the years between the 2011 general election and the election in 2015 and some Tory MHAs crossed the floor to the Liberal Party including former cabinet minister Tom Osborne. In the months ahead of the election in 2015 the Liberals lead in the polls, often with support from the majority of respondents. The party won 31 of 40 seats in the election.

Since the election support for the Liberal Party has dropped significantly. This started in April 2016 when Finance Minister Cathy Bennett unveiled the government's budget. Due to the ongoing fall in oil prices and high public debt due to overspending by the Tories under Williams and Dunderdale, the province faced a massive deficit and thus, the Liberal government planned tax increases and cuts to government services including the closure of libraries and courthouses. Combined with the mismanagement of the Lower Churchill Project and Nalcor Energy, this led to Ball being one of Canada's least popular heads of government only seven months after being elected with a majority of votes.

On June 16, 2018 delegates at the Liberal Party Annual General Meeting vote to endorse the leadership of Dwight Ball with 79% voting against the party holding a leadership convention.

In the 2019 provincial election, despite consistent Progressive Conservative leads in polling through the debate, including a 9 point lead in the final poll, released a day before the election, the Liberal Party led by Ball won re-election, but nonetheless fell one seat short of retaining their majority after an unexpected loss to the New Democrats in Labrador West by 5 votes (later lowered to 2 votes). The Liberals won 20 out of 40 seats in the legislature.

=== Furey government (2020–2025) ===
The logo of the Liberal Party during Furey's premiership.

Andrew Furey was elected leader on August 3, 2020. He was appointed as Premier on August 19, 2020, following Ball's resignation. On August 19, 2020, Furey was formally sworn in as Premier, along with his provincial cabinet. On October 6, 2020, Furey won a by-election in Humber-Gros Morne; this gained him a seat in the legislature.

On January 15, 2021, Furey asked for consent from Lieutenant Governor Judy Foote to dissolve the House of Assembly to call for an election in order to obtain a stronger mandate in the form of a majority government. The election was originally scheduled for February 15, 2021 but a COVID-19 outbreak in St. John's forced Elections NL to switch to a mail-in election, cancelling in-person voting for all districts. The deadline was set on March 25, 2021 and the results were announced on March 27, 2021 with the Furey government winning a majority government.

On September 12, 2022, Premier Furey announced that Independent MHA Perry Trimper would be rejoining the Liberal caucus.

Beginning in December 2023, ahead of a by-election for Conception Bay East–Bell Island expected in early 2024, campaign signs identified the party primarily using a "Furey" logotype, with a reference to "Newfoundland and Labrador Liberals" in smaller print. Political analysts suggested the change was made due to Furey's personal popularity combined with dropping poll numbers for the federal Liberals under Justin Trudeau. Furey himself indicated that there was no plan to further separate the parties, which he said already operate as distinct entities. On January 30, 2024, Liberal Fred Hutton won the by-election. On April 15, 2024, the Fogo Island-Cape Freels by-election was held. Progressive Conservative (PC) candidate Jim McKenna was elected, gaining the seat from the Liberals. On May 27, 2024, PC candidate Lin Paddock was elected in the Baie Verte-Green Bay by-election, gaining the seat from the Liberals. On August 22, 2024, the Waterford Valley by-election was held electing Liberal Jamie Korab.

On December 12, 2024, Churchill Falls negotiations culminated in the signing of a historic Memorandum of Understanding by Newfoundland and Labrador Hydro, Hydro-Québec, and CFLCo. The agreement was publicly announced by Premier Furey and Québec Premier François Legault as a transformative new partnership intended to replace the 1969 contract seventeen years before its expiry. The MOU proposed a new 51-year power purchase agreement extending to 2075, a major increase in revenues from Churchill Falls power, upgrades and expansion of the existing generating station, construction of a new 2,250 MW generating station at Gull Island, and development of new transmission infrastructure in Labrador and Québec. The provincial government estimated that the overall package would generate approximately $225 billion to $227 billion in total nominal revenues over the life of the agreements. The announcement was accompanied by an acknowledgement agreement with the Innu Nation recognizing provincial commitments under the New Dawn Agreement.

Following the announcement, the Furey government undertook an extensive public campaign to build support for the agreement. A special session of the House of Assembly was held in January 2025 to examine the MOU in detail. During four days of debate, members questioned Newfoundland and Labrador Hydro executives, legal advisors, and external consultants involved in the negotiations. On January 9, 2025, the House voted in favour of continuing negotiations toward definitive agreements with Hydro-Québec. The motion passed with support from Liberal, New Democratic Party, and Independent members, while Progressive Conservative members left the chamber before the vote, arguing that a more independent review was required before further commitments were made.

On February 25, 2025, Andrew Furey announced his pending resignation as premier and leader of the Liberal Party. He remained as premier and party leader, until his successor was chosen at a leadership election in May.

=== Liberals under John Hogan (2025–present) ===
John Hogan was elected leader on May 3, 2025. In the 2025 provincial election, the party was defeated by Tony Wakeham's PC's.

== Electoral performance ==
Election	Leader	Votes	%	Seats	+/–	Position	Status
1949	Joey Smallwood	109,802	65.5	22 / 28	▲22	▲1st	Majority
1951	Joey Smallwood	83,628	63.1	24 / 28	▲2	1st	Majority
1956	Joey Smallwood	75,883	65.7	32 / 36	▲8	1st	Majority
1959	Joey Smallwood	75,560	58.0	31 / 36	▼1	1st	Majority
1962	Joey Smallwood	72,319	58.7	34 / 42	▲3	1st	Majority
1966	Joey Smallwood	91,613	61.8	39 / 42	▲5	1st	Majority
1971	Joey Smallwood	102,775	44.4	20 / 42	▼19	▼2nd	Minority
1972	Edward Roberts	77,849	37.1	9 / 42	▼11	2nd	Opposition
1975	Edward Roberts	82,270	37.0	16 / 51	▲7	2nd	Opposition
1979	Don Jamieson	95,943	40.6	19 / 52	▲3	2nd	Opposition
1982	Len Stirling	87,228	34.9	8 / 52	▼11	2nd	Opposition
1985	Leo Barry	102,016	36.7	15 / 52	▲7	2nd	Opposition
1989	Clyde Wells	137,271	47.2	31 / 52	▲16	▲1st	Majority
1993	Clyde Wells	148,274	49.1	35 / 52	▲4	1st	Majority
1996	Brian Tobin	157,229	55.1	37 / 48	▲2	1st	Majority
1999	Brian Tobin	132,399	49.6	32 / 48	▼5	1st	Majority
2003	Roger Grimes	91,729	33.0	12 / 48	▼20	▼2nd	Opposition
2007	Gerry Reid	48,598	21.6	3 / 48	▼9	2nd	Opposition
2011	Kevin Aylward	42,417	19.1	6 / 48	▲3	2nd	Opposition
2015	Dwight Ball	114,195	57.2	31 / 40	▲25	▲1st	Majority
2019	Dwight Ball	93,608	43.9	20 / 40	▼11	1st	Minority
2021	Andrew Furey	86,090	48.2	22 / 40	▲3	1st	Majority
2025	John Hogan	86,671	43.4	15 / 40	▼7	▼2nd	Opposition

== History of leaders ==
- Joseph Roberts Smallwood (1949–1972)
- Edward Roberts (1972–1977)
- Bill Rowe (1977–1979)
- Don Jamieson (1979–1980)
- Len Stirling (1980–1982)
- Steve Neary (1982–1984) interim
- Leo Barry (1984–1987)
- Clyde Wells (1987–1996)
- Brian Tobin (1996–2000)
- Beaton Tulk (2000–2001) interim
- Roger Grimes (2001–2005)
- Gerry Reid (2005–2006) interim
- Jim Bennett (2006)
- Gerry Reid (2006–2007)
- Yvonne Jones (2007–2011) interim 2007–2011
- Kevin Aylward (2011–2012)
- Dwight Ball (2012–2013) interim
- Eddie Joyce (2013) interim
- Dwight Ball (2013–2020)
- Andrew Furey (2020–2025)
- John Hogan (2025–present)

== See also ==
- List of Liberal Party of Newfoundland and Labrador leadership elections
- List of Newfoundland and Labrador premiers
- Leader of the Opposition (Newfoundland and Labrador)
- List of political parties in Newfoundland and Labrador
- Liberal parties in Newfoundland (pre-Confederation)
