= Clyde Wells (politician) =

5th Premier of Newfoundland

The Honourable Clyde Wells ONL ECNL KC

5th Premier of Newfoundland
- In office May 5, 1989 – January 26, 1996
- Monarch: Elizabeth II
- Lieutenant Governor: James A. McGrath; Frederick Russell
- Preceded by: Thomas Rideout
- Succeeded by: Brian Tobin

MHA for Humber East
- In office September 8, 1966 – October 28, 1971
- Preceded by: Noel Murphy
- Succeeded by: Tom Farrell

MHA for Windsor-Buchans
- In office December 17, 1987 – April 20, 1989
- Preceded by: Graham Flight
- Succeeded by: Graham Flight

MHA for Bay of Islands
- In office April 21, 1989 – February 22, 1996
- Preceded by: Eddie Joyce
- Succeeded by: Brian Tobin

Personal details
- Born: Clyde Kirby Wells; November 9, 1937 (age 88) Buchans Junction, Newfoundland
- Party: Liberal
- Occupation: Lawyer

Clyde Kirby Wells, ONL ECNL KC (born November 9, 1937) was the fifth provincial premier of Newfoundland from 1989 to 1996, and subsequently Chief Justice of Newfoundland and Labrador, sitting on the Supreme Court of Newfoundland and Labrador (Court of Appeal) from 1998 to 2009.

== Early life, family, and education ==
Wells was born in Buchans Junction, Newfoundland, at a time when the Dominion was under formal administration as a 'Commission of Government' from the United Kingdom.

Wells grew up from age seven in the town of Stephenville Crossing, in the western part of Newfoundland. Wells was the second-oldest of nine children of Ralph Wells and Maude (nee Kirby) Wells; his father was a railway express messenger and freight handler. The Wells family was poor, and devoutly religious, with the Anglican parish church located very close to their home; the family assisted the parish priest with church operations. Wells completed high school with grade 11 in 1952 at age 15, and then worked as a record-keeper for a construction company operating at the United States Air Force's nearby Harmon Base, as well as a plumber's assistant, for three years, to earn money for university; his earnings also helped to support his family.

=== Memorial University ===
Wells graduated from Memorial University of Newfoundland with a BA in Political Science in 1959, with a B average. He was mentored at Memorial by political science professor Mose Morgan, who was also a key university administrator. Morgan strongly influenced Wells with his own federal administrative governance theories. With his father's sudden death in 1959, Wells helped to support his family when possible by working in Stephenville Crossing. Wells was very active in extra-curricular activities at Memorial. He played ice hockey as a goaltender with the Memorial varsity team, was a co-founder of the university's student Liberal Club, served one term in student government, and assisted with the yearbook's production.

=== Dalhousie Law School ===
Wells graduated on schedule from the three-year law program at Dalhousie Law School in Halifax, Nova Scotia with a LL.B in 1962. He ranked in the middle of his class at Dalhousie Law, where future Canadian prime minister Brian Mulroney was a classmate for one year before failing.

== Early legal career ==
Wells had served in the Canadian Armed Forces Reserve, with the Reserve Officer Training Corps, throughout his post-secondary years, including having his third year of law studies financially supported in full. Following law school graduation, he articled in Halifax, and was admitted to the Bar of Nova Scotia. Wells was then required to serve as a lawyer with the Forces for three years following graduation; he did this with the Judge Advocate General's Office in Ottawa, but bought his way out after two years. He then began private legal practice in Corner Brook in summer 1964, joining the established firm of Kevin Barry.

== Marriage, family ==
Wells married Eleanor Bishop, whom he had known since childhood, on August 20, 1962, in Stephenville Crossing, shortly after law school graduation. Bishop grew up as the daughter of the village's leading business family, and herself graduated from the nursing program at the Royal Victoria Hospital in Halifax. The couple has three children: Mark, Heidi, and David.

== Entry into Newfoundland politics: elected, chosen for Cabinet ==
Wells entered the Cabinet of Premier Joey Smallwood in August 1966, and was elected to the Newfoundland and Labrador House of Assembly for the district of Humber East in the 1966 general election, as a member of the Liberal Party.

Wells and John Crosbie resigned from Cabinet on May 14, 1968 over concerns with Premier Smallwood's handling of financing for the Come By Chance Refinery project, which subsequently failed.

== Resumes legal career ==
Wells left politics in 1971, and resumed his legal practice full-time, gradually developing his career and becoming one of the province's most successful lawyers. With most of his clients based in the St. John's region, Wells transferred his practice to the provincial capital in 1979.

== CBA Committee on the Constitution ==
While in private practice, Wells was a member of the Canadian Bar Association. In 1977, in the aftermath of the election of the separatist Parti Québécois government in 1976, Wells was asked to sit on the CBA Committee on the Constitution. The mandate of the Committee was to study and make recommendations on the Constitution of Canada. The members of the Committee were drawn from each province of Canada, and included two future provincial premiers (Wells and Joe Ghiz), a future Supreme Court of Canada justice, two future provincial chief justices, and a future Canadian Ambassador to the United Nations. The Committee presented its report to the CBA at the next annual meeting, in 1978. The Committee made wide-ranging recommendations for constitutional change, including a completely new constitution, abolishing the monarchy, changing the Senate, entrenching language rights and a bill of rights, and changing the balance of powers between the federal government and the provinces.

== Return to provincial politics, becomes premier ==
In 1987, he was elected leader of the Liberal Party, succeeding Leo Barry. Graham Flight, the party's incumbent MHA in Windsor-Buchans, resigned to allow him to contest the seat in a by-election.

In the 1989 general election, Wells led the party to power, defeating Tom Rideout and ending 17 years of Progressive Conservative rule. In that election, the Progressive Conservatives won a slightly higher percentage of the popular vote (one percentage point). Nonetheless, the Liberals won 31 of the 52 seats in the provincial legislature and formed a majority government.

Wells ran in his home riding of Humber East instead of Windsor-Buchans, but was defeated by Lynn Verge, despite having led his party to victory. Subsequently, another member of his caucus, Eddie Joyce, resigned and Wells was acclaimed as the new member for the electoral district of Bay of Islands.

Wells became a major figure on the national political stage at the time of the Meech Lake Accord for his opposition to several of its provisions. Wells cancelled the scheduled vote on the agreement in the Newfoundland Legislative Assembly after the Accord failed in the Manitoba Legislative Assembly, when Indigenous MLA Elijah Harper prevented the Assembly from ratifying the Accord, on the grounds that the Accord was devised without adequate Indigenous consultation. The Accord would have required ratification by all ten provincial legislative assemblies and the two houses of Parliament to come into effect. (Wells also noted that, in addition to the failure in Manitoba, the Accord was headed for a likely defeat in the Newfoundland House of Assembly.)

Wells later participated in discussions that led to the development of a set of constitutional proposals known as the Charlottetown Accord.

The Wells administration reformed the province's educational system, implemented far-reaching economic reforms, concluded an agreement to develop the province's first offshore oil field, and coped with the consequences of the collapse of cod stocks off the coast of the province, due to over-fishing, all at the time of a severe economic recession.

== Retirement from politics ==
Wells retired as Premier in January 1996 and returned to private legal practice. In 1998, he was appointed to the Supreme Court of Newfoundland (Court of Appeal) and was appointed Chief Justice in 1999. He retired from that post in March 2009. On November 8, 2012 Wells retired as a justice of the court.

== See also ==
- Hoy, Claire (1992). Clyde Wells: A Political Biography. Toronto: Stoddart. ISBN 0-7737-2652-7.

This book describes in detail the early life, family, education, early legal career, early political career, and later legal career of Wells. It focuses on his re-entry into politics, early years as premier, and gives particular detailed emphasis to the Meech Lake debates, negotiations, and outcome.
