= Brian Tobin =

Canadian politician

The Honourable Brian Tobin PC OC ECNL
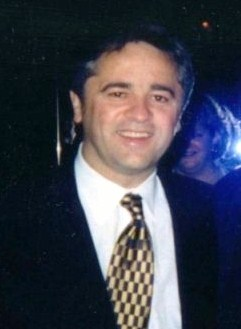

6th Premier of Newfoundland
- In office January 26, 1996 – October 16, 2000
- Monarch: Elizabeth II
- Lieutenant Governor: Frederick Russell; Arthur Maxwell House
- Preceded by: Clyde Wells
- Succeeded by: Beaton Tulk

Member of Parliament for Bonavista—Trinity—Conception
- In office November 27, 2000 – January 25, 2002
- Preceded by: Fred Mifflin
- Succeeded by: John Efford

MHA for The Straits – White Bay North
- In office February 9, 1999 – October 17, 2000
- Preceded by: Chris Decker
- Succeeded by: Trevor Taylor

MHA for Bay of Islands
- In office February 22, 1996 – February 9, 1999
- Preceded by: Clyde Wells
- Succeeded by: Eddie Joyce

Member of Parliament for Humber—St. Barbe—Baie Verte (Humber—Port au Port—St. Barbe; 1980–1988)
- In office February 18, 1980 – January 25, 1996
- Preceded by: Fonse Faour
- Succeeded by: Gerry Byrne

Personal details
- Born: Brian Vincent Tobin; October 21, 1954 (age 72) Stephenville, Newfoundland, Canada
- Party: Liberal

Brian Vincent Tobin (born October 21, 1954) is a Canadian businessman and former politician. Tobin served as the sixth premier of Newfoundland from 1996 to 2000. Tobin was also a prominent Member of Parliament and served as a cabinet minister in Jean Chrétien's Liberal government.

== Early life, education, and family ==
Tobin was born in Stephenville, Newfoundland. He studied political science at Memorial University of Newfoundland in St. John's. He worked a brief stint as a TV news announcer with NBC (now NTV) before joining the Liberal Party of Newfoundland and Labrador as a political aide to former federal Member of Parliament (MP) and federal cabinet minister Don Jamieson.

Tobin is married to Jodean (Smith) and they have three children: Heather, Adam, and Jack.

== Political career ==
Tobin was first elected to the House of Commons of Canada as a Liberal in the 1980 election. He was re-elected in the 1984 election even though Brian Mulroney's, Progressive Conservative Party (PC) won the largest majority government in Canadian history. It was at this time however that Tobin gained prominence as a member of the "Rat Pack", which was the nickname given to a group of young, high-profile Canadian Liberal opposition MPs during Mulroney's government.

=== In government ===
Following the 1993 election in which the Liberals regained power from the Progressive Conservatives after almost a decade in opposition, Tobin was appointed Minister of Fisheries and Oceans.

In the ministry, Tobin distinguished himself from his colleagues with speeches rife with rhetoric and his youthful exuberance. Throughout 1994 he mounted a fierce campaign against foreign over-fishing of waters on the nose and tail of the Grand Banks, located just outside Canada's declared 200 nautical mile (370 km) Exclusive Economic Zone (EEZ). People across Canada took notice of this new and aggressive posture, a position that had not been taken by a federal minister—Liberal or Conservative—since the EEZ was declared in 1977.

Critics note that Tobin was likely doing this to preserve his political life in his home province. At this point, Newfoundland and Labrador was wracked by rapidly rising unemployment and social unrest over the fiscal situation which many believed had been caused by federal mismanagement of foreign and domestic overfishing. This had resulted in the 1992 "Northern Cod Moratorium." In April 1995, Tobin's department was embroiled in the Turbot War (known in Spain as Guerra del Fletán). He received full backing of the United Kingdom and Ireland in the pursuit. Later that month, Tobin conducted an international news conference from a barge on the East River outside the United Nations headquarters and dramatically displayed an illegal, under Canadian Law, trawl net that had allegedly been cut from a Spanish trawler which was arrested outside the Canadian EEZ, on international waters. The net was over 16 stories high and was hung from a crane causing a media sensation. Tobin was accused by the arrested shipmen of ill-intentionally orchestrating a media-oriented frame-up to mislead attention from economic and public image problems Canada was facing.

Tobin helped organize a pro-Canada rally in Montreal before the October 1995 Quebec referendum—busing in thousands of university students and other residents from English Canada. For his roles as Fisheries Minister and in the referendum, he earned the nickname "Captain Canada".

=== Premier of Newfoundland ===
In 1996, Tobin resigned from federal politics to succeed Clyde Wells as leader of the governing Liberal Party of Newfoundland and premier. The Liberal Party won a large majority government later that year. During his time as premier Tobin pursued tough negotiations with out-of-province companies seeking to export resources for refining and smelting elsewhere. He insisted that the resources will never be mined unless Newfoundlanders received secondary manufacturing and tertiary service spin-offs. A similar tough stance was taken in seeking to develop the Lower Churchill River, keeping in mind the contract his predecessor Joey Smallwood had negotiated. His Liberals won re-election in 1999.

It was also during this time in the lead-up to the millennium that Newfoundland undertook an aggressive tourism marketing campaign which focused on important anniversaries such as the 500th year since John Cabot's voyage of discovery (1997), as well as the 1000th year since Vikings, such as Leif Ericson, made landfall on the province's shores (2000).

=== Return to federal politics ===
In October 2000, Tobin suddenly resigned to join the federal Cabinet and run for re-election to the House of Commons in a snap election called by Governor General Adrienne Clarkson on the advice of Prime Minister Jean Chrétien. Chrétien advised that his friend be appointed as Minister of Industry before the election, replacing John Manley, and Tobin was easily elected in the riding of Bonavista—Trinity—Conception. His departure from the premiership caused speculation among Newfoundlanders and Canadians about his aspirations for the leadership of the federal Liberals following what was assumed would be Chrétien's final term as prime minister. Tobin's position in Industry would allow him to develop a relationship with the nation's business leaders who would ultimately be financing any potential leadership campaign. In January 2002, Tobin abruptly resigned both his cabinet portfolio and parliament seat. Observers interpreted that his departure of federal politics was due to his frustration at the stranglehold on the future leadership of the Liberal party by the then Minister of Finance, Paul Martin, and possibly because Chrétien had promoted Manley to Deputy Prime Minister.

== Post-political career ==
In retirement from politics, Tobin has served on the board of several Canadian corporations. He became CEO of Magna International Developments (MID), controller of Magna's vast real estate and horse track holdings, the latter through Magna Entertainment Corporation. After only a few months in the position, he left after disagreements with Magna chairman and controlling shareholder Frank Stronach. The dispute was supposedly over the propriety of a share buyback program, while others suggested that it was because Stronach would not give Tobin autonomy to operate. Tobin has since joined the policy think-tank the Fraser Institute. In the past, Tobin had referred to the Fraser Institute and its fellows as "Loony-Tunes". It is there that Tobin began his association with the ideas and political plans of Preston Manning and Mike Harris. Tobin is also a Senior Business Advisor with Fraser Milner Casgrain LLP in Toronto and is a member of the firm's Public Policy Group. Through his involvement in policy decisions first entered as ideals at the Fraser Institute, Tobin has influenced the sale of energy interests in Alberta including the sale of two billion dollars' worth of Alberta oil and gas interests to an Abu Dhabi company through their Houston affiliate as shown on the Fraser Milner Casgrain website.

In 2003, Tobin authored his biography titled All In Good Time.

With the defeat of the Liberals in the 2006 Canadian federal election to Stephen Harper's Conservatives, Prime Minister Martin resigned from the leadership of the party. There were frequent rumors that Tobin, and other former cabinet colleagues Allan Rock and John Manley would run to succeed Martin. On January 31, 2006, Tobin officially announced that he would not be running for the federal Liberal leadership.

On December 25, 2010, Tobin's son Jack was charged with impaired driving causing death over an incident in which his best friend, Alex Zolpis, was killed. His son later pleaded guilty and was granted full parole just over a year into a three-year sentence.

He was appointed an Officer of the Order of Canada on 19 November 2012. His citation reads:

Brian Tobin is highly regarded for his strong and principled leadership. As a federal cabinet minister, he was instrumental in leading the implementation of the Oceans Act, which provides a unique framework for modern ocean management. He also took a strong stance against offshore over-fishing by foreign fleets. His term as premier of Newfoundland and Labrador was marked by important economic reforms to traditional industries, the modernization of the educational system, and the development of the offshore oil and gas industry. In the corporate sector, he is known for his commitment to sound governance and corporate social responsibility.

In April 2013, BMO Capital Markets, the investment and corporate banking arm of BMO Financial Group, announced that it hired Tobin as vice-chair. He was as of September 2026 the Vice Chair of the BMO Financial Group.

26th Canadian Ministry (1993–2003) – Cabinet of Jean Chrétien
Cabinet posts (4)
Predecessor	Office	Successor
John Manley	Minister of Industry; 2000–2002	Allan Rock
John Manley	Minister of Western Economic Diversification; 2000–2002	Allan Rock
John Manley	Minister for the Atlantic Canada Opportunities Agency; 2000–2002	Allan Rock
Ross Reid	Minister of Fisheries and Oceans; 1993–1996	Fred Mifflin
Special Cabinet Responsibilities
Predecessor	Title	Successor
John Manley	Minister responsible for the Economic Development Agency of Canada for the Regions of Quebec; 2000–2002	vacant, later Lucienne Robillard
