= Canadian federal election results in Newfoundland and Labrador =

Electoral history
Year	Results
2025	
2021	
2019	
2015	
2011	
2008	
2006	
2004	
2000	
1997	
1993	
1988	
1984	
1980	
1979	
1974	
1972	
1968	
1965	
1963	
1962	
1958	
1957	
1953	
1949	

Canadian federal elections have provided the following results in Newfoundland and Labrador.

== Regional profile ==
Newfoundland and Labrador has been a Liberal heartland since it joined Canada in 1949, with only the city of St. John's electing Progressive Conservatives on a relatively consistent basis in the past, though that support shifted to the NDP and Liberals in 2006 and to the NDP in the 2008 elections. Even in the 1984 Mulroney landslide, more rural and remote seats went Liberal than PC. The Conservatives picked up one seat in the 2006 election, but the Liberals still held a majority of the seats. Party preference in Newfoundland has a lot to do with religion, where Catholics tend to vote Conservative and Protestants Liberal (contrary to the rest of the country). The 1968, 1972, and 1984 federal elections were the only ones since Newfoundland's entry into Confederation in which the Liberals did not win a majority of seats in Newfoundland and Labrador.

In 2008, as the Anything But Conservative movement took hold in Newfoundland and Labrador, the Conservatives lost all their seats to the Liberals and NDP.

In the 2011 election, Newfoundland and Labrador was the only province in which the Liberal Party won the overall popular vote (during the party's historic nationwide collapse and fall to third place), in addition to a majority of the province's seats. However, they lost two seats: one to the Conservatives and one to the NDP.

In the 2015 election, Justin Trudeau's Liberals captured every seat in the province (as well as all other Atlantic provinces), most by landslide majorities. In Bonavista—Burin—Trinity, they received 81.78% of the vote, the highest share obtained by any party in any riding in that election. This marks the most recent time the Liberals swept the province's seats; in following elections, the Liberals would continue to maintain a decisive advantage in the province.

=== Votes by party throughout time ===
Election	Liberal	Conservative	NDP/CCF	Green	People's	PC	Reform / Alliance	Social Credit	Others
1949	77,248; 72.4%	—N/a	197; 0.2%	—N/a	—N/a	29,203; 27.4%	—N/a	—N/a	—N/a
1953	74,357; 67.2%	—N/a	707; 0.6%	—N/a	—N/a	31,060; 28.1%	—N/a	—N/a	4,459; 4.0%
1957	56,993; 61.9%	—N/a	321; 0.3%	—N/a	—N/a	34,795; 37.8%	—N/a	—N/a	—N/a
1958	86,960; 54.4%	—N/a	240; 0.2%	—N/a	—N/a	72,282; 45.2%	—N/a	—N/a	263; 0.2%
1962	91,593; 59.2%	—N/a	7,590; 4.9%	—N/a	—N/a	55,396; 35.8%	—N/a	158; 0.1%	—N/a
1963	97,439; 64.4%	—N/a	6,364; 4.2%	—N/a	—N/a	45,491; 30.1%	—N/a	—N/a	1,943; 1.3%
1965	94,291; 64.1%	—N/a	1,742; 1.2%	—N/a	—N/a	47,638; 32.4%	—N/a	2,352; 1.6%	1,022; 0.7%
1968	68,549; 42.8%	—N/a	7,042; 4.4%	—N/a	—N/a	84,483; 52.7%	—N/a	126; 0.1%	—N/a
1972	78,505; 45.2%	—N/a	8,165; 4.7%	—N/a	—N/a	84,418; 48.6%	—N/a	266; 0.2%	2,253; 1.3%
1974	82,884; 47.2%	—N/a	16,445; 9.4%	—N/a	—N/a	75,816; 43.2%	—N/a	143; 0.1%	242; 0.1%
1979	81,861; 40.6%	—N/a	59,978; 29.7%	—N/a	—N/a	59,893; 29.7%	—N/a	—N/a	—N/a
1980	95,354; 47.0%	—N/a	33,943; 16.7%	—N/a	—N/a	72,999; 36.0%	—N/a	—N/a	749; 0.4%
1984	87,778; 36.4%	—N/a	13,993; 5.8%	—N/a	—N/a	138,867; 57.6%	—N/a	—N/a	521; 0.2%
1988	115,588; 45.0%	—N/a	31,769; 12.4%	—N/a	—N/a	108,349; 42.2%	—N/a	—N/a	1,025; 0.4%
1993	155,237; 67.3%	—N/a	8,080; 3.5%	—N/a	—N/a	61,488; 26.7%	2,392; 1.0%	—N/a	3,393; 1.5%
1997	84,657; 37.9%	—N/a	49,125; 22.0%	388; 0.2%	—N/a	82,214; 36.8%	5,632; 2.5%	—N/a	1,564; 0.7%
2000	103,103; 44.9%	—N/a	29,993; 13.1%	—N/a	—N/a	79,157; 34.5%	8,837; 3.9%	—N/a	8,408; 3.7%
2004	95,254; 48.0%	64,158; 32.3%	34,700; 17.5%	3,117; 1.6%	—N/a	—N/a	—N/a	—N/a	1,263; 0.6%
2006	97,452; 42.8%	97,159; 42.7%	30,882; 13.6%	2,046; 0.9%	—N/a	—N/a	—N/a	—N/a	—N/a
2008	91,025; 46.8%	32,261; 16.6%	65,680; 33.7%	3,259; 1.7%	—N/a	—N/a	—N/a	—N/a	179; 0.1%
2011	82,344; 37.9%	61,562; 28.3%	70,868; 32.6%	1,954; 0.9%	—N/a	—N/a	—N/a	—N/a	608; 0.3%
2015	165,418; 64.5%	26,469; 10.3%	54,120; 21.1%	2,772; 1.1%	—N/a	—N/a	—N/a	—N/a	7,501; 2.9%
2019	109,148; 44.9%	67,962; 27.9%	57,664; 23.7%	7,617; 3.1%	335; 0.1%	—N/a	—N/a	—N/a	141; 0.1%
2021	104,240; 47.8%	70,783; 32.5%	37,743; 17.3%	—N/a	5,150; 2.4%	—N/a	—N/a	—N/a	—N/a
2025	150,458; 54.1%	110,259; 39.7%	15,319; 5.5%	299; 0.1%	537; 0.2%	—N/a	—N/a	—N/a	1,135; 0.4%

Liberal Conservative New Democratic Green People's	Progressive Conservative (defunct) Alliance (defunct) Reform (defunct)

== Representation history by area ==
Representation	Burin Peninsula	Burgeo	Bay St. George South	Port au Port Peninsula	Humber Arm	St. Barbe	Baie Verte Peninsula	Labrador	Grand Falls-Windsor	Gander	Notre Dame Bay	Bonavista	Trinity Bay (West)	Trinity Bay (East)	Conception Bay (West)	Avalon Peninsula (South)	St. John's West End & Mount Pearl	St. John's East End & Cape St. Francis	Conception Bay South
1949	Burin—Burgeo		Humber—St. George's				Grand Falls—White Bay				Bonavista—Twillingate		Trinity—Conception			St. John's West		St. John's East	
1952	Burin—Burgeo		Humber—St. George's				Grand Falls—White Bay—Labrador				Bonavista—Twillingate		Trinity—Conception			St. John's West		St. John's East	
1966	Burin—Burgeo		Humber—St. George's—St. Barbe				Grand Falls—White Bay—Labrador			Gander—Twillingate		Bonavista—Trinity—Conception				St. John's West		St. John's East	
1976	Burin—St. George's			Humber—Port au Port—St. Barbe			Grand Falls—White Bay—Labrador			Gander—Twillingate		Bonavista—Trinity—Conception				St. John's West		St. John's East	
1987	Burin—St. George's				Humber—St. Barbe—Baie Verte			Labrador	Gander—Grand Falls			Bonavista—Trinity—Conception				St. John's West		St. John's East	
1996	Burin—St. George's				Humber—St. Barbe—Baie Verte			Labrador	Gander—Grand Falls			Bonavista—Trinity—Conception				St. John's West		St. John's East	
2003	Random—Burin—St. George's				Humber—St. Barbe—Baie Verte			Labrador	Bonavista—Gander—Grand Falls—Windsor				Random—Burin—St. George's	Avalon			St. John's South—Mount Pearl	St. John's East	Avalon
2012	Bonavista—Burin—Trinity	Long Range Mountains					Coast of Bays—Central—Notre Dame	Labrador	Coast of Bays—Central—Notre Dame			Bonavista—Burin—Trinity			Avalon		St. John's South—Mount Pearl	St. John's East	Avalon
2022	Terra Nova—The Peninsulas	Long Range Mountains					Central Newfoundland	Labrador	Central Newfoundland			Terra Nova—The Peninsulas			Avalon		Cape Spear	St. John's East	Avalon

== 2025 ==
Electoral district	Candidates					Incumbent
Electoral district	Liberal	Conservative	NDP	Green	Other	Incumbent
Avalon	Paul Connors; 27,563; 58.6%	Steve Kent; 16,953; 36.0%	Judy Vanta; 2,284; 4.9%		Alexander Tilley (Rhino.); 230; 0.5%	Ken McDonald†
Cape Spear	Tom Osborne; 31,388; 68.3%	Corey Curtis; 11,844; 25.8%	Brenda Walsh; 2,446; 5.3%	Kaelem Tingate; 140; 0.3%	Mike Peach (APP); 170; 0.4%	Seamus O'Regan^{$} St. John's South—Mount Pearl
Central Newfoundland	Lynette Powell; 17,696; 43.5%	Clifford Small; 21,975; 54.1%	Darian Vincent; 965; 2.4%			Clifford Small; Coast of Bays—Central—Notre Dame
Labrador	Philip Earle; 5,811; 51.5%	Ella Wallace; 4,709; 41.7%	Marius Normore; 764; 6.8%			Yvonne Jones†
Long Range Mountains	Don Bradshaw; 19,726; 42.7%	Carol Anstey; 23,232; 50.3%	Sarah Parsons; 2,011; 4.4%		Robbie Coles (Ind.); 637 1.4%	Gudie Hutchings^{$}
Long Range Mountains	Don Bradshaw; 19,726; 42.7%	Carol Anstey; 23,232; 50.3%	Sarah Parsons; 2,011; 4.4%		Pamela Geiger (PPC); 537 1.2%	Gudie Hutchings^{$}
St. John's East	Joanne Thompson; 28,681; 62.3%	David Brazil; 11,941; 25.9%	Mary Shortall; 5,172; 11.2%	Otis Crandell; 159; 0.3%	Samuel Crête (Comm.); 98; 0.2%	Joanne Thompson
Terra Nova—The Peninsulas (judicially certified)	Anthony Germain; 19,593; 47.9%	Jonathan Rowe; 19,605; 48.0%	Liam Ryan; 1,677; 4.1%			Churence Rogers†; Bonavista—Burin—Trinity

== 2021 ==
Electoral district	Candidates				Incumbent
Electoral district	Liberal	Conservative	NDP	PPC	Incumbent
Avalon	Ken McDonald; 18,608; 50.10%	Matthew Chapman; 12,738; 34.29%	Carolyn Davis; 5,151; 13.87%	Lainie Stewart; 647; 1.74%	Ken McDonald
Bonavista—Burin—Trinity	Churence Rogers; 13,972; 46.59%	Sharon Vokey; 12,278; 40.94%	Anne Marie Anonsen; 2,484; 8.28%	Linda Hogan; 1,257; 4.19%	Churence Rogers
Coast of Bays—Central—Notre Dame	Scott Simms; 14,646; 46.01%	Clifford Small; 14,927; 46.89%	Jamie Ruby; 2,261; 7.10%		Scott Simms
Labrador	Yvonne Jones; 4,119; 42.67%	Shane Dumaresque; 2,930; 30.35%	Amy Norman; 2,297; 23.80%	Shannon Champion; 307; 3.18%	Yvonne Jones
Long Range Mountains	Gudie Hutchings; 16,178; 44.39%	Carol Anstey; 14,344; 39.36%	Kaila Mintz; 4,347; 11.93%	Darrell Shelley; 1,578; 4.33%	Gudie Hutchings
St. John's East	Joanne Thompson; 17,239; 45.16%	Glenn Etchegary; 7,119; 18.65%	Mary Shortall; 13,090; 34.29%	Dana Metcalfe; 723; 1.89%	Jack Harris†
St. John's South—Mount Pearl	Seamus O'Regan; 19,478; 56.17%	Steve Hodder; 6,447; 18.59%	Ray Critch; 8,113; 23.40%	Georgia Faith Stewart; 638; 1.84%	Seamus O'Regan

== 2019 ==
Electoral district	Candidates					Incumbent
Electoral district	Liberal	Conservative	NDP	Green	Other	Incumbent
Avalon	Kenneth McDonald; 19,122; 46.26%	Matthew Chapman; 12,855; 31.10%	Lea Mary Movelle; 7,142; 17.28%	Greg Malone; 2,215; 5.36%		Ken McDonald
Bonavista—Burin—Trinity	Churence Rogers; 14,707; 45.70%	Sharon Vokey; 12,697; 39.46%	Matthew Cooper; 3,855; 11.98%	Kelsey Reichel; 920; 2.86%		Churence Rogers
Coast of Bays—Central—Notre Dame	Scott Simms; 16,514; 48.31%	Alex Bracci; 12,081; 35.34%	Noel Joe; 4,224; 12.36%	Byron White; 1,363; 3.99%		Scott Simms
Labrador	Yvonne Jones; 4,851; 42.48%	Larry Flemming; 3,548; 31.07%	Michelene Gray; 2,796; 24.49%	Tyler Colbourne; 224; 1.96%		Yvonne Jones
Long Range Mountains	Gudie Hutchings; 18,199; 47.36%	Josh Eisses; 10,873; 28.30%	Holly Pike; 7,609; 19.80%	Lucas Knill; 1,334; 3.47%	Robert Miles (VCP); 411; 1.07%	Gudie Hutchings
St. John's East	Nick Whalen; 14,962; 33.20%	Joedy Wall; 8,141; 18.06%	Jack Harris; 21,148; 46.92%	David Peters; 821; 1.82%		Nick Whalen
St. John's South—Mount Pearl	Seamus O'Regan; 20,793; 51.13%	Terry Martin; 7,767; 19.10%	Anne Marie Anonsen; 10,890; 26.78%	Alexandra Hayward; 740; 1.82%	David Jones (CHP); 141; 0.35% Benjamin Ruckpaul (PPC); 335; 0.82%	Seamus O'Regan

== 2015 ==
Electoral district	Candidates					Incumbent
Electoral district	Conservative	NDP	Liberal	Green	Other	Incumbent
Avalon	Lorraine E. Barnett; 4,670; 11.10%	Jeannie Baldwin; 6,075; 14.43%	Ken McDonald; 23,528; 55.90%	Krista Byrne-Puumala; 228; 0.54%	Scott Andrews (NA); 7,501 17.82%	Scott Andrews (Note: Scott Andrews was elected as a Liberal in the 2011 election but was suspended from the Liberal Party caucus in November 2014 by leader Justin Trudeau, following allegations of personal misconduct laid by two unnamed NDP MPs.)
Avalon	Lorraine E. Barnett; 4,670; 11.10%	Jeannie Baldwin; 6,075; 14.43%	Ken McDonald; 23,528; 55.90%	Krista Byrne-Puumala; 228; 0.54%	Jennifer McCreath (SD); 84 0.20%	Scott Andrews
Bonavista—Burin— Trinity	Mike Windsor; 3,534; 10.07%	Jenn Brown; 2,557; 7.29%	Judy M. Foote; 28,704; 81.80%	Tyler John Colbourne; 297; 0.85%		Judy Foote; Random—Burin—St. George's
Coast of Bays—Central— Notre Dame	Kevin George O'Brien; 6,479; 18.28%	Claudette Menchenton; 2,175; 6.14%	Scott Simms; 26,523; 74.82%	Elizabeth Perry; 271; 0.76%		Scott Simms; Bonavista—Gander—Grand Falls—Windsor
Labrador	Peter Penashue; 1,716; 13.87%	Edward Rudkowski; 1,779; 14.38%	Yvonne Jones; 8,878; 71.75%	(Note: Mary Lou Harley was announced on the Green Party website as their candidate for Labrador but did not register with Elections Canada.)		Yvonne Jones
Long Range Mountains	Wayne Ruth; 5,085; 12.16%	Devon Babstock; 4,739; 11.33%	Gudie Hutchings; 30,889; 73.85%	Terry Cormier; 1,111; 2.66%		Gerry Byrne†; Humber—St. Barbe—Baie Verte
St. John's East	Deanne Stapleton; 2,938; 6.55%	Jack Harris; 20,328; 45.29%	Nick Whalen; 20,974; 46.73%	David Anthony Peters; 500; 1.11%	Sean Burton (Comm.); 140; 0.31%	Jack Harris
St. John's South— Mount Pearl	Marek Krol; 2,047; 4.57%	Ryan Cleary; 16,467; 36.76%	Seamus O'Regan; 25,922; 57.86%	Jackson McLean; 365; 0.81%		Ryan Cleary

== 2011 ==
Electoral district	Candidates					Incumbent
Electoral district	Conservative	Liberal	NDP	Green	Other	Incumbent
Avalon	Fabian Manning; 14,749; 40.51%	Scott Andrews; 16,008; 43.97%	Matthew Martin Fuchs; 5,157; 14.16%	Matt Crowder; 218; 0.60%	Randy Wayne Dawe (Ind.); 276; 0.76%	Scott Andrews
Bonavista—Gander— Grand Falls—Windsor	Aaron Hynes; 8,595; 27.59%	Scott Simms; 17,977; 57.70%	Clyde Bridger; 4,306; 13.82%	Robyn Kenny; 279; 0.90%		Scott Simms
Humber—St. Barbe— Baie Verte	Trevor Taylor; 7,559; 25.18%	Gerry Byrne; 17,119; 57.04%	Shelley Senior; 4,751; 15.83%	Robin Blair Gosse; 253; 0.84%	Wayne R. Bennett (Ind.); 332; 1.11%	Gerry Byrne
Labrador	Peter Penashue; 4,256; 39.81%	Todd Russell; 4,177; 39.07%	Jacob Larkin; 2,120; 19.83%	George C.R. Barrett; 139; 1.30%		Todd Russell
Random—Burin— St. George's	John Ottenheimer; 8,322; 32.00%	Judy Foote; 12,914; 49.65%	Stella Magalios; 4,465; 17.17%	Tanya Gutmanis; 307; 1.18%		Judy Foote
St. John's East	Jerry Byrne; 9,198; 20.87%	John Allan; 3,019; 6.85%	Jack Harris; 31,388; 71.22%	Robert Miller; 467; 1.06%		Jack Harris
St. John's South— Mount Pearl	Loyola Sullivan; 8,883; 22.79%	Siobhán Coady; 11,130; 28.55%	Ryan Cleary; 18,681; 47.92%	Rick Austin; 291; 0.75%		Siobhán Coady

== 2008 ==
Electoral district	Candidates					Incumbent
Electoral district	Conservative	Liberal	NDP	Green	Other	Incumbent
Avalon	Fabian Manning; 11,542; 35.16%	Scott Andrews; 14,866; 45.28%	Randy Wayne Dawe; 5,707; 17.38%	Dave Aylward; 714; 2.17%		Fabian Manning
Bonavista— Gander— Grand Falls— Windsor	Andrew House; 4,354; 15.23%	Scott Simms; 20,089; 70.27%	Jason Holley; 3,577; 12.51%	Robert Karl O'Connor; 568; 1.99%		Scott Simms
Humber— St. Barbe— Baie Verte	Lorne Robinson; 2,799; 10.63%	Gerry Byrne; 17,956; 68.22%	Mark Kennedy; 4,603; 17.49%		Wayne Ronald Bennett (NLFP); 964; 3.66%	Gerry Byrne
Labrador	Lacey Lewis; 615; 7.97%	Todd Russell; 5,426; 70.28%	Phyllis Artiss; 1,378; 17.85%	Nyssa Christine McLeod; 302; 3.91%		Todd Russell
Random— Burin— St. George's	Herb Davis; 4,791; 20.50%	Judy Foote; 12,557; 53.72%	Terry White; 5,553; 23.80%	Kaitlin Wainwright; 462; 1.98%		Bill Matthews†
St. John's East	Craig Westcott; 3,836; 9.26%	Walter Noel; 5,211; 12.58%	Jack Harris; 30,881; 74.55%	Howard Storey; 570; 1.38%	Les Coultas (NLFP); 347 0.84%	Norman Doyle†
St. John's East	Craig Westcott; 3,836; 9.26%	Walter Noel; 5,211; 12.58%	Jack Harris; 30,881; 74.55%	Howard Storey; 570; 1.38%	Shannon John Tobin (PC); 578 1.40%	Norman Doyle†
St. John's South— Mount Pearl	Merv Wiseman; 4,324; 12.56%	Siobhan Coady; 14,920; 43.32%	Ryan Cleary; 13,971; 40.57%	Ted Warren; 643; 1.87%	Terry Christopher Butler (Ind.); 179 0.52%	Loyola Hearn†
St. John's South— Mount Pearl	Merv Wiseman; 4,324; 12.56%	Siobhan Coady; 14,920; 43.32%	Ryan Cleary; 13,971; 40.57%	Ted Warren; 643; 1.87%	Greg Byrne (NLFP); 402 1.17%	Loyola Hearn†

== 2006 ==
The Liberals won four seats and the Conservatives three. The open Avalon seat changed hands from the Liberals to the Tories. The seat had been held by Natural Resources Minister John Efford, who had retired. Otherwise, there was little change from the previous election.

Electoral district	Candidates				Incumbent
Electoral district	Liberal	Conservative	NDP	Green	Incumbent
Avalon	Bill Morrow; 14,318; 38.58%	Fabian Manning; 19,132; 51.55%	Eugene Conway; 3,365; 9.07%	Shannon Hillier; 297; 0.80%	John Efford†
Bonavista—Gander— Grand Falls—Windsor	Scott Simms; 19,866; 52.04%	Aaron Hynes; 15,376; 40.28%	Sandra Cooze; 2,668; 6.99%	Judy Davis; 265; 0.69%	Scott Simms
Humber—St. Barbe—Baie Verte	Gerry Byrne; 17,208; 52.90%	Cyril Jr. Pelley; 10,137; 31.16%	Holly Pike; 4,847; 14.90%	Martin Hanzalek; 339; 1.04%	Gerry Byrne
Labrador	Todd Norman Russell; 5,768; 50.53%	Joe Goudie; 4,528; 39.67%	Jacob Edward Larkin; 1,037; 9.08%	Gail Zwicker; 82; 0.72%	Todd Russell (Note: Russell won seat in byelection held May 24, 2005. Previously held by Liberal Lawrence D. O'Brien (died December 16, 2004).)
Random—Burin—St. George's	Bill Matthews; 13,652; 45.49%	Cynthia Downey; 12,232; 40.76%	Amanda Will; 3,702; 12.34%	Mark Brennan; 426; 1.42%	Bill Matthews
St. John's East	Paul Antle; 14,345; 34.95%	Norman Doyle; 19,110; 46.56%	Mike Kehoe; 7,190; 17.52%	Stephen Eli Harris; 402; 0.98%	Norman Doyle
St. John's South—Mount Pearl	Siobhan Coady; 12,295; 33.01%	Loyola Hearn; 16,644; 44.69%	Peg Norman; 8,073; 21.67%	Barry Crozier; 235; 0.63%	Loyola Hearn

== 2004 ==
One of the biggest questions of the 2004 election was whether the new Conservative Party of Canada could match the old federal PC Party's level of support in Atlantic Canada. With Newfoundland and Labrador's provincial PC government unpopular over mandating an end to the previous year's public service strike, any province-wide success for 2004 was seen as unlikely. The Conservatives lost one of their three seats (previously gained in a byelection) and held their rump in St. John's. Des McGrath was seen as the NDP's best chance of electing a candidate in the province in several decades, but he still fell nearly 4000 votes short of winning Random—Burin—St. George's.

Electoral district	Candidates					Incumbent
Electoral district	Liberal	Conservative	NDP	Green	Independent	Incumbent
Avalon	R. John Efford; 18,335; 58.34%	Rick Dalton; 9,211; 29.31%	Michael Kehoe; 3,450; 10.98%	Don C. Ferguson; 430; 1.37%		John Efford (Note: Efford won seat in 2002 byelection; originally held by Liberal Brian Tobin.)
Bonavista—Exploits	Scott Simms; 15,970; 48.20%	Rex Barnes; 13,786; 41.61%	Samuel Robert McLean; 2,667; 8.05%	Ed Sailor White; 367; 1.11%	John Lannon; 344; 1.04%	Rex Barnes (Note: Barnes won seat in 2002 byelection; originally held by Liberal George Baker.)
Humber—St. Barbe—Baie Verte	Gerry Byrne; 17,820; 62.56%	Wynanne Downer; 6,538; 22.95%	Holly Pike; 3,743; 13.14%	Steve Durant; 384; 1.35%		Gerry Byrne
Labrador	Lawrence David O'Brien; 5,524; 62.23%	Merrill Strachan; 1,400; 15.77%	Shawn Crann; 856; 9.64%	Lori-Ann Martino; 178; 2.01%	Ern Condon; 919; 10.35%	Lawrence D. O'Brien
Random—Burin—St. George's	Bill Matthews; 12,383; 46.77%	Larry Peckford; 4,820; 18.21%	Des McGrath; 8,797; 33.23%	Justin Dollimont; 474; 1.79%		Bill Matthews
St. John's North	Walter Noel; 13,343; 36.65%	Norman E Doyle; 15,073; 41.40%	Janine Piller; 7,198; 19.77%	Scott Vokey; 791; 2.17%		Norman Doyle
St. John's South	Siobhan Coady; 11,879; 35.26%	Loyola Hearn; 13,330; 39.57%	Peg Norman; 7,989; 23.71%	Stephen Daniel Willcott; 493; 1.46%		Loyola Hearn

=== Maps ===
1. Avalon
2. Bonavista-Exploits
3. Humber-St. Barbe-Baie Verte
4. Labrador
5. Random-Burin-St. George's
6. St. John's North
7. St. John's South
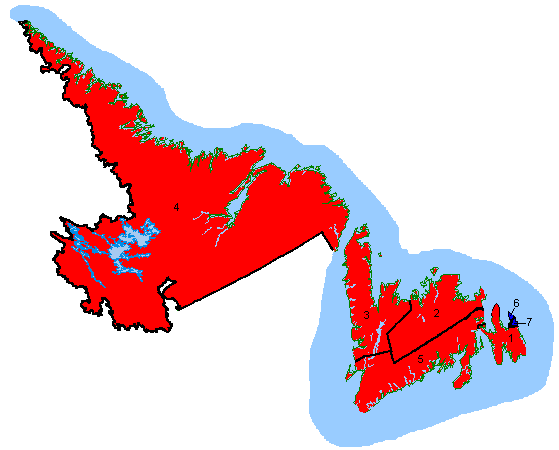
Key map

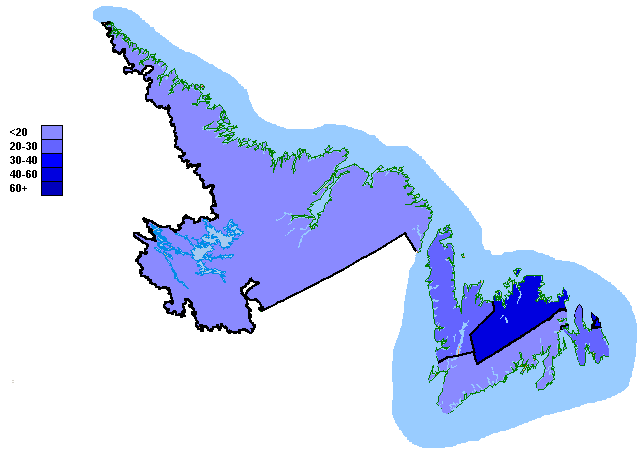
Conservative Party of Canada

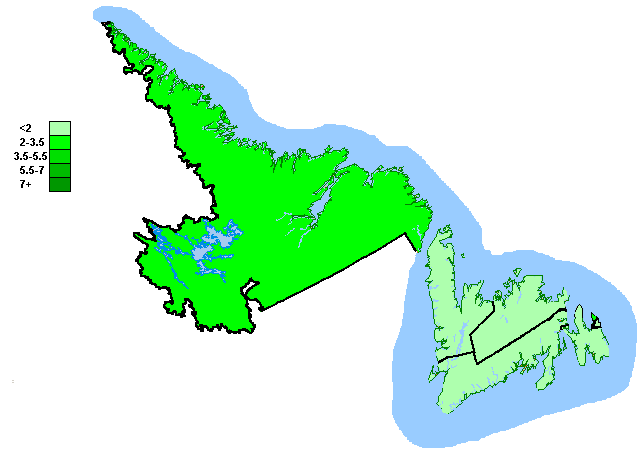
Green Party of Canada

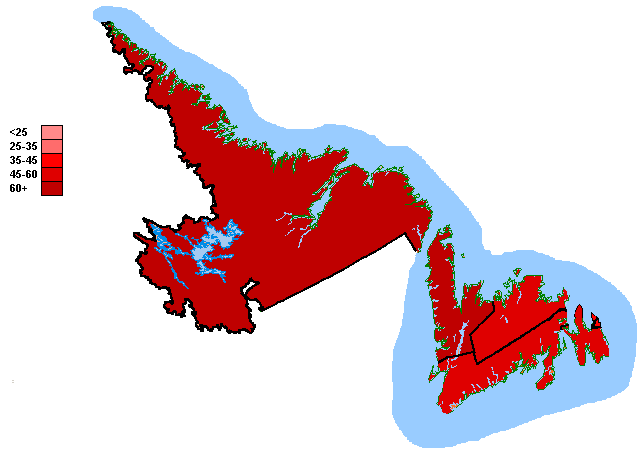
Liberal Party of Canada

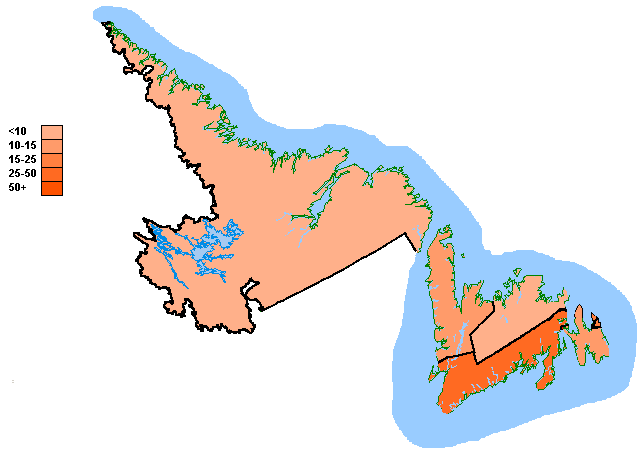
New Democratic Party

== 2000 ==
Despite a slight gain compared to the Reform Party's results in the province in 1997, the Canadian Alliance obtained its worst provincial share of votes in Newfoundland and Labrador.

Electoral district	Candidates					Incumbent
Electoral district	Liberal	Canadian Alliance	NDP	PC	Other	Incumbent
Bonavista—Trinity—Conception	Brian Tobin; 22,096; 54.38%	Randy Wayne Dawe; 1,051; 2.59%	Fraser March; 6,473; 15.93%	Jim Morgan; 11,009; 27.10%		Fred Mifflin†
Burin—St. George's	Bill Matthews; 14,603; 47.52%	Peter Fenwick; 1,511; 4.92%	David Sullivan; 924; 3.01%	Fred Pottle; 5,798; 18.87%	Sam Synard (NA); 7,891; 25.68%	Bill Matthews (Note: Matthews defected from the Progressive Conservative Party in August 1999.)
Gander—Grand Falls	George Baker; 15,874; 55.02%	Orville Penney; 1,912; 6.63%	Bill Broderick; 2,876; 9.97%	Roger K. Pike; 8,191; 28.39%		George Baker
Humber—St. Barbe—Baie Verte	Gerry Byrne; 15,405; 48.53%	Murdock Cole; 1,702; 5.36%	Trevor Taylor; 8,297; 26.14%	Peter McBreairty; 6,340; 19.97%		Gerry Byrne
Labrador	Lawrence O'Brien; 7,153; 68.99%	Eugene Burt; 677; 6.53%	Amanda Will; 1,284; 12.38%	Hayward Broomfield; 1,254; 12.09%		Lawrence O'Brien
St. John's East	Peter Miller; 13,835; 31.19%	Garry Hartle; 1,144; 2.58%	Carol Cantwell; 5,395; 12.16%	Norman E. Doyle; 23,606; 53.22%	Judy Day (Ind.); 254 0.57% Michael Rayment (NLP); 122 0.28%	Norman Doyle
St. John's West	Chuck Furey; 14,137; 33.01%	Eldon Drost; 840; 1.96%	Dave Curtis; 4,744; 11.08%	Loyola Hearn; 22,959; 53.62%	Michael Rendell (NLP); 141; 0.33%	Loyola Hearn

== 1997 ==
As with the other Atlantic Canadian provinces, the Progressive Conservatives maintained a foothold in Newfoundland by gaining three seats from the Liberals, and the Reform Party failed to make inroads in the region.

Electoral district	Candidates					Incumbent
Electoral district	Liberal	Reform	NDP	PC	Other	Incumbent
Bonavista—Trinity—Conception	Fred Mifflin; 12,929; 35.25%		Fraser March; 12,359; 33.70%	Randy Dawe; 10,332; 28.17%	Christopher Randell (Ind.); 1,054; 2.87%	Fred Mifflin
Burin—St. George's	Roger Simmons; 11,715; 38.56%		David Sullivan; 4,784; 15.75%	Bill Matthews; 13,884; 45.70%		Roger Simmons
Gander—Grand Falls	George Baker; 13,409; 52.21%		Mary Shortall; 3,620; 14.10%	Todd Barker; 8,652; 33.69%		George Baker
Humber—St. Barbe—Baie Verte	Gerry Byrne; 12,057; 39.83%	Randy Wells; 1,969; 6.50%	Joan Scott; 4,421; 14.60%	Art Bull; 11,825; 39.06%		Brian Tobin
Labrador	Lawrence O'Brien; 6,182; 50.62%	Stephanie Girardin; 573; 4.69%	Randy Collins; 4,615; 37.79%	Mike Patton; 842; 6.89%		Bill Rompkey†
St. John's East	Bonnie Hickey; 12,048; 27.17%	David Tulett; 1,977; 4.46%	Ted Warren; 12,460; 28.09%	Norman Doyle; 17,286; 38.98%	Jonathan Whalen (Green); 388; 0.87%	Bonnie Hickey
St. John's East	Bonnie Hickey; 12,048; 27.17%	David Tulett; 1,977; 4.46%	Ted Warren; 12,460; 28.09%	Norman Doyle; 17,286; 38.98%	Michael Rayment (Natural Law); 191; 0.43%	Bonnie Hickey
St. John's West	Rex Gibbons; 16,317; 37.08%	Harold Ruby; 1,113; 2.53%	Lee Ingram; 6,866; 15.60%	Charlie Power; 19,393; 44.07%	Michael Rendell (Natural Law); 319; 0.72%	Jean Payne†

== 1993 ==
The Progressive Conservatives had fractured under Prime Minister Kim Campbell and the insurgent Reform Party had only nominated two candidates in St. John's, allowing the Liberals to elect a full slate of candidates in Newfoundland for the first time since 1965. This rout of the Progressive Conservative government came in the wake of the 1992 Atlantic cod fishery moratorium.

Electoral district	Candidates						Incumbent
Electoral district	PC	Liberal	NDP	Reform	Natural Law	Other	Incumbent
Bonavista—Trinity—Conception	Charlie Brett; 7,479; 21.32%	Fred Mifflin; 26,230; 74.77%	Clem George; 1,003; 2.86%		Lynn Tobin; 370; 1.05%		Fred Mifflin
Burin—St. George's	Paul Gallant; 4,935; 15.91%	Roger Simmons; 24,912; 80.30%	Mark Noseworthy; 757; 2.44%		Michael Rendell; 418; 1.35%		Roger Simmons
Gander—Grand Falls	Tom Rideout; 6,063; 19.56%	George Baker; 24,202; 78.08%	Dennis Whalen; 530; 1.71%		Nolan White; 200; 0.65%		George Baker
Humber—St. Barbe—Baie Verte	Margaret O'Rourke; 5,160; 15.78%	Brian Tobin; 26,879; 82.21%	Linda Soper; 658; 2.01%				Brian Tobin
Labrador	Wayne Piercey; 2,141; 18.94%	Bill Rompkey; 8,721; 77.14%	Barry Knight; 443; 3.92%				Bill Rompkey
St. John's East	Ross Reid; 19,320; 42.13%	Bonnie Hickey; 20,270; 44.20%	Bob Buckingham; 2,937; 6.40%	Leonard Barron; 1,362; 2.97%	Michael Rayment; 389; 0.85%	Bill Vetter (National); 1,235; 2.69%	Ross Reid
St. John's East	Ross Reid; 19,320; 42.13%	Bonnie Hickey; 20,270; 44.20%	Bob Buckingham; 2,937; 6.40%	Leonard Barron; 1,362; 2.97%	Michael Rayment; 389; 0.85%	Bob Tremblett (CHP); 340; 0.76%	Ross Reid
St. John's West	Loyola Hearn; 16,390; 37.57%	Jean Payne; 24,023; 55.06%	Sharon Walsh; 1,752; 4.02%	Dana Tucker; 1,030; 2.36%	Guy Harvey; 432; 0.99%		John Crosbie†

== 1988 ==
The Liberals recovered the two seats they had lost in the preceding election. The Progressive Conservatives once again only elected candidates in the Avalon Peninsula, regaining the seat of St. John's East that they had lost to New Democratic candidate Jack Harris in a by-election.

Electoral district	Candidates				Incumbent
Electoral district	PC	Liberal	NDP	Other	Incumbent
Bonavista—Trinity—Conception	Morrissey Johnson; 17,809; 42.94%	Fred Mifflin; 21,290; 51.34%	Larry Welsh; 2,372; 5.72%		Morrissey Johnson
Burin—St. George's	Joe Price; 17,488; 16.43%	Roger Simmons; 18,527; 48.36%	Joseph Edwards; 2,299; 6.00%		Roger Simmons
Gander—Grand Falls	Abe Schwartz; 11,478; 31.52%	George Baker; 20,314; 55.79%	Bryan Blackmore; 4,618; 12.68%		George Baker; Gander—Twillingate
Humber—St. Barbe—Baie Verte	Terry Young; 11,477; 29.30%	Brian Tobin; 13,170; 44.56%	Marie Newhook; 1,441; 3.68%		Brian Tobin; Humber—Port au Port—St. Barbe
Labrador	Joseph Goudie; 4,400; 33.03%	Bill Rompkey; 7,126; 53.50%	Evelyn Riggs; 1,508; 11.32%	Ern Condon (Ind.); 286; 2.15%	Bill Rompkey
St. John's East	Ross Reid; 21,503; 44.13%	Jim Baird; 9,285; 19.06%	Jack Harris; 17,198; 35.30%	Robert Tremblett (CHP); 739; 1.52%	Jack Harris
St. John's West	John Crosbie; 24,194; 61.54%	Genevieve Payne; 12,787; 32.53%	Alfred Sullivan; 2,333; 5.93%		John Crosbie

== 1984 ==
For only the third time in its provincial history, Newfoundland elected a majority of the Progressive Conservative slate as Brian Mulroney's government took power.

Electoral district	Candidates				Incumbent
Electoral district	Liberal	PC	NDP	Other	Incumbent
Bonavista—Trinity—Conception	Dave Rooney; 14,103; 40.82%	Morrissey Johnson; 19,015; 55.04%	Susan Maher; 1,432; 4.15%		Dave Rooney
Burin—St. George's	Roger Simmons; 12,885; 46.29%	Joe Price; 13,184; 47.36%	Joseph Edwards; 1,767; 6.35%		Roger Simmons
Gander—Twillingate	George Baker; 16,100; 53.11%	Eugene Burt; 13,076; 43.14%	Gerry Panting; 1,138; 3.75%		George Baker
Grand Falls—White Bay—Labrador	Bill Rompkey; 12,938; 45.13%	Peter J. Walsh; 12,114; 42.26%	Ern Condon; 3,616; 12.61%		Bill Rompkey
Humber—Port au Port—St. Barbe	Brian Tobin; 17,409; 48.29%	Mike Monaghan; 16,916; 46.92%	Ken Gould; 1,530; 4.24%	Derek Woodman (Ind.); 196; 0.54%	Brian Tobin
St. John's East	Elizabeth Reynolds; 5,644; 14.32%	James McGrath; 30,866; 78.30%	Christine Oliver; 2,584; 6.56%	Paul Paquet (Libert.); 325; 0.82%	James McGrath
St. John's West	Walter Carter; 8,699; 19.63%	John Crosbie; 33,696; 76.03%	Nina Patey; 1,926; 4.35%		John Crosbie

== 1980 ==
In a vote of confidence for the administration of Pierre Elliott Trudeau, the Liberals took the seat of Humber—Port au Port—St. Barbe from the New Democrats and again restricted the Progressive Conservatives to the Avalon Peninsula.

Electoral district	Candidates				Incumbent
Electoral district	PC	Liberal	NDP	Other	Incumbent
Bonavista—Trinity—Conception	Edward Bailey; 8,388; 30.20%	Dave Rooney; 14,467; 52.08%	Anne Robbins; 4,619; 16.63%	Ted Noseworthy (Ind.); 302; 1.09%	Dave Rooney
Burin—St. George's	James Oxford; 3,522; 16.43%	Roger Simmons; 14,979; 69.90%	Peter Fenwick; 2,929; 13.67%		Roger Simmons
Gander—Twillingate	Harold Collins; 7,788; 28.23%	George Baker; 15,408; 62.65%	Clyde West; 2,338; 8.47%		George Baker
Grand Falls—White Bay—Labrador	Ray Hawco; 7,375; 25.01%	Bill Rompkey; 15,330; 52.67%	Ern Condon; 6,582; 22.32%		Bill Rompkey
Humber—Port au Port—St. Barbe	Ben Alexander; 6,852; 23.18%	Brian Tobin; 13,170; 44.56%	Fonse Faour; 9,535; 32.26%		Fonse Faour
St. John's East	James McGrath; 20,007; 61.26%	Ernest Bishop; 8,320; 25.47%	George Corbett; 3,973; 12.16%	Ann Barney (Ind.); 270; 0.83%	James McGrath
St. John's East	James McGrath; 20,007; 61.26%	Ernest Bishop; 8,320; 25.47%	George Corbett; 3,973; 12.16%	Carol Hodge (M-L); 91; 0.28%	James McGrath
St. John's West	John Crosbie; 19,067; 55.20%	Aidan Hennebury; 11,423; 33.07%	Michael Maher; 3,967; 11.48%	Tony Seed (M-L); 86; 0.25%	John Crosbie

== 1979 ==
Despite a federal victory, the Progressive Conservatives (PCs) again only elected candidates in the Avalon Peninsula, having lost Humber—Port au Port—St. Barbe to a New Democratic opponent in a by-election. John Crosbie would go on to serve in the cabinets of Prime Ministers Joe Clark and Brian Mulroney.

Electoral district	Candidates			Incumbent
Electoral district	Liberal	PC	NDP	Incumbent
Bonavista—Trinity—Conception	Dave Rooney; 11,314; 45.80%	Patrick Layman; 5,943; 24.06%	Bill Parsons; 7,448; 30.15%	Dave Rooney
Burin—St. George's	Don Jamieson; 14,960; 70.34%	Allen Evans; 2,366; 11.12%	Ross Senior; 3,943; 18.54%	Don Jamieson; Burin—Burgeo
Gander—Twillingate	George Baker; 15,408; 62.65%	Fred Dixon; 4,727; 19.22%	Wallace Bown; 4,460; 18.12%	George Baker
Grand Falls—White Bay—Labrador	Bill Rompkey; 13,639; 46.09%	Calvin Osmond; 3,418; 11.55%	Bryan Blackmore; 12,538; 42.37%	Bill Rompkey
Humber—Port au Port—St. Barbe	George Billard; 8,782; 28.70%	George Hutchings; 5,941; 19.42%	Fonse Faour; 15,872; 51.88%	Fonse Faour; Humber—St. George's—St. Barbe
St. John's East	John Dustan; 7,734; 22.30%	James McGrath; 20,262; 58.43%	Stratford Canning; 6,684; 19.27%	James McGrath
St. John's West	Patrick O'Flaherty; 10,024; 27.62%	John Crosbie; 17,236; 47.49%	Tom Mayo; 9,033; 24.89%	John Crosbie

== 1974 ==
The Liberals picked up the seat in Gander—Twillingate, contributing to Pierre Elliott Trudeau's majority government.

Electoral district	Candidates					Incumbent
Electoral district	Liberal	PC	NDP	Social Credit	Other	Incumbent
Bonavista—Trinity—Conception	Dave Rooney; 13,258; 50.12%	John Lundrigan; 12,117; 45.81%	Ted Noseworthy; 1,078; 4.08%			Dave Rooney
Burin—Burgeo	Don Jamieson; 13,530; 81.98%	Max Strong; 2,254; 13.66%	Lowell Paulson; 721; 4.37%			Don Jamieson
Gander—Twillingate	George Baker; 12,722; 55.59%	Rupert Short; 8,021; 35.05%	Edgar Russell; 2,143; 9.36%			John Lundrigan‡ (ran in Bonavista—Trinity—Conception)
Grand Falls—White Bay—Labrador	Bill Rompkey; 14,274; 57.64%	Jim Janes; 5,433; 23.47%	Donald Head; 5,026; 21.71%			Bill Rompkey
Humber—St. George's—St. Barbe	Jim Campbell; 10,049; 36.11%	Jack Marshall; 16,500; 59.29%	Ann Robbins; 1,279; 4.60%			Jack Marshall
St. John's East	Norman Whalen; 10,187; 33.78%	James McGrath; 16,941; 56.18%	George Corbett; 2,783; 9.23%		Wayne Saint John (Ind.); 242; 0.80%	James McGrath
St. John's West	Lilian Bouzane; 8,864; 32.86%	Walter Carter; 14,550; 53.94%	Walter Noel; 3,415; 12.66%	Carey Skinner; 143; 0.53%		Walter Carter

== 1972 ==
Although the Liberals partially recovered from the previous election by regaining two seats, the Progressive Conservatives again elected the most candidates.

Electoral district	Candidates					Incumbent
Electoral district	Liberal	PC	NDP	Social Credit	Other	Incumbent
Bonavista—Trinity—Conception	Dave Rooney; 12,635; 54.91%	Frank Woodman; 8,799; 38.24%	Edgar Russell; 832; 3.62%	Carey Skinner; 127; 0.55%	Sam Drover (Ind.); 616; 2.68%	Dave Rooney
Burin—Burgeo	Don Jamieson; 13,883; 73.20%	Max Keeping; 4,746; 25.03%	Lowell Paulson; 336; 1.77%			Don Jamieson
Gander—Twillingate	George Baker; 10,396; 44.44%	John Lundrigan; 12,420; 53.09%	Walwin Blackmore; 577; 2.47%			John Lundrigan
Grand Falls—White Bay—Labrador	Bill Rompkey; 14,274; 57.64%	Ambrose Peddle; 8,968; 36.21%	Earle Boone; 1,523; 6.15%			Ambrose Peddle
Humber—St. George's—St. Barbe	Meech Matthews; 10,200; 36.11%	Jack Marshall; 16,378; 57.99%	Calvin Hillyard; 1,666; 5.90%			Jack Marshall
St. John's East	Margaret Dunn; 9,887; 33.72%	James McGrath; 17,728; 60.47%	Graham Kelly; 1,563; 5.33%	Norman King; 139; 0.47%		James McGrath
St. John's West	David B. Porter; 7,230; 26.43%	Walter Carter; 15,379; 56.69%	Moses Ingram; 1,668; 6.10%		Hugh Shea (Ind.); 1,637; 5.98%	Walter Carter

== 1968 ==
Although the nationwide election saw victory for Liberal leader Pierre Elliott Trudeau, dissatisfaction with the provincial Smallwood government resulted in the near complete rout of the Liberal incumbent candidates. Except for Burin—Burgeo, Progressive Conservative candidates were elected in every riding. This was the first federal election where the New Democratic Party ran a complete slate of candidates in Newfoundland.

Electoral district	Candidates				Incumbent
Electoral district	Liberal	PC	NDP	Social Credit	Incumbent
Bonavista—Trinity—Conception	James Tucker; 10,082; 39.64%	Frank Moores; 14,823; 58.27%	Fraser March; 532; 2.09%		James Tucker; Trinity—Conception
Burin—Burgeo	Don Jamieson; 8,674; 58.32%	Robert McGrath; 5,440; 36.58%	Donald Barton; 758; 5.10%		Don Jamieson
Gander—Twillingate	Charles Granger; 9,016; 45.15%	John Lundrigan; 10,601; 53.09%	Lowell Paulson; 352; 1.76%		Charles Granger; Bonavista—Twillingate
Grand Falls—White Bay—Labrador	Andrew Chatwood; 9,587; 46.81%	Ambrose Peddle; 10,322; 50.40%	Austin Scott; 571; 2.79%		Andrew Chatwood
Humber—St. George's—St. Barbe	Herman Batten; 9,482; 42.10%	Jack Marshall; 9,765; 43.36%	Calvin Hillyard; 3,276; 14.55%		Herman Batten; Humber—St. George's
St. John's East	Joseph O'Keefe; 10,558; 35.44%	James McGrath; 18,153; 60.93%	Mary Summers; 956; 3.21%	Norman King; 126; 0.42%	Joseph O'Keefe
St. John's West	Richard Cashin; 11,150; 41.10%	Walter Carter; 15,379; 56.69%	John Connors; 597; 2.20%		Richard Cashin

== 1965 ==
The Liberal Party retained all of the seats by substantial margins.

Electoral district	Candidates					Incumbent
Electoral district	Liberal	PC	NDP	Social Credit	Other	Incumbent
Bonavista—Twillingate	Jack Pickersgill; 10,113; 73.28%	William Moss; 3,687; 26.72%				Jack Pickersgill
Burin—Burgeo	Chesley W. Carter; 11,350; 74.90%	Mervin Pond; 3,360; 22.17%		Eric Hiscock; 444; 2.93%		Chesley W. Carter
Grand Falls—White Bay—Labrador	Charles Granger; 17,933; 70.96%	Thomas Pitcher; 5,779; 22.87%		Harold Parsons; 1,560; 6.17%		Charles Granger
Humber—St. George's	Herman Batten; 13,855; 62.80%	James Tompkins; 8,208; 37.20%				Herman Batten
St. John's East	Joseph O'Keefe; 16,182; 55.97%	William Browne; 11,894; 41.14%	Cyril Strong; 602; 2.08%	Norman King; 233; 0.81%		Joseph O'Keefe
St. John's West	Richard Cashin; 14,481; 56.23%	Gerry Ottenheimer; 10,054; 39.85%	Esau Thoms; 580; 2.30%	Carey Skinner; 115; 0.46%		Richard Cashin
Trinity—Conception	James Tucker; 10,377; 62.46%	Joseph Noel; 4,656; 28.02%	Harold Horwood; 560; 3.37%		Sam Drover (Ind. Lib.); 1,022; 6.15%	James Tucker

== 1963 ==
As the anger with Newfoundland's reduced financial assistance continued, the province elected a full slate of Liberal candidates for the second time, contributing to the downfall of the Diefenbaker government.

Electoral district	Candidates				Incumbent
Electoral district	PC	Liberal	NDP	Other	Incumbent
Bonavista—Twillingate	Guy Eveleigh; 2,448; 15.17%	Jack Pickersgill; 11,748; 72.79%		Walter Davis (Ind. Lib.); 1,943; 12.04%	Jack Pickersgill
Burin—Burgeo	Samuel Walters; 2,439; 16.70%	Chesley W. Carter; 12,167; 83.30%			Chesley W. Carter
Grand Falls—White Bay—Labrador	Cyril Pelley; 6,545; 25.37%	Charles Granger; 18,233; 70.66%	Kitchener Pritchett; 1,025; 3.97%		Charles Granger
Humber—St. George's	Edna Murphy; 4,295; 18.86%	Herman Batten; 13,468; 56.81%	Ed Finn; 4,873; 21.40%		Herman Batten
St. John's East	James McGrath; 13,911; 48.51%	Joseph O'Keefe; 14,768; 51.49%			James McGrath
St. John's West	Art Harnett; 10,997; 41.99%	Richard Cashin; 14,724; 56.23%	James J. Walsh; 466; 1.78%		Richard Cashin
Trinity—Conception	Albert Butt; 4,856; 28.25%	James Tucker; 12,331; 71.75%			James Tucker

== 1962 ==
Premier Smallwood had taken issue with the Royal Commission report on the financial assistance given to Newfoundland which had been established under Term 29 of the Terms of Union. Anger over Prime Minister John Diefenbaker's decision to bring funds down to match those given to the other provinces allowed the Liberals to narrowly take the seat of St. John's East by a margin of just 24 votes. This was the first election where the New Democratic Party (NDP), the successors to the Co-operative Commonwealth Federation (CCF), fielded candidates outside of St. John's East. It was also the first general election in Newfoundland where the Social Credit Party ran candidates.

Electoral district	Candidates				Incumbent
Electoral district	PC	Liberal	Social Credit	NDP	Incumbent
Bonavista—Twillingate	Whitfield Bannister; 3,846; 25.01%	Jack Pickersgill; 11,530; 74.99%			Jack Pickersgill
Burin—Burgeo	Alec Stacey; 3,163; 20.15%	Chesley W. Carter; 12,533; 79.85%			Chesley W. Carter
Grand Falls—White Bay—Labrador	Wolfred Nelson; 6,057; 24.21%	Charles Granger; 16,401; 65.55%		William Gillies; 2,561; 10.24%	Charles Granger
Humber—St. George's	William J. Smith; 7,887; 31.58%	Herman Batten; 13,468; 56.81%		Ed Finn; 4,313; 17.27%	Herman Batten
St. John's East	James McGrath; 14,821; 52.33%	Brian White; 12,907; 45.57%	Eric Hiscock; 158; 0.56%	James J. Walsh; 435; 1.54%	James McGrath
St. John's West	William Browne; 12,626; 49.40%	Richard Cashin; 12,650; 49.50%		Stanley Ross; 281; 1.10%	William Browne
Trinity—Conception	Albert Butt; 6,996; 36.63%	James Tucker; 12,104; 63.37%			James Tucker

== 1958 ==
Although the Progressive Conservatives generally performed better provincially compared to the preceding election and won a large majority government nationwide, they still failed to win any seats outside of the Avalon Peninsula.

Electoral district	Candidates				Incumbent
Electoral district	PC	Liberal	CCF	Other	Incumbent
Bonavista—Twillingate	Gerald Winter; 4,323; 24.03%	Jack Pickersgill; 13,670; 75.97%			Jack Pickersgill
Burin—Burgeo	Harvey Cole; 4,847; 29.91%	Chesley W. Carter; 11,360; 70.09%			Chesley W. Carter
Grand Falls—White Bay—Labrador	David Decker; 10,129; 38.28%	Charles Granger; 16,328; 61.72%			Thomas Ashbourne†
Humber—St. George's	Tom Cahill; 10,239; 43.19%	Herman Batten; 13,468; 56.81%			Herman Batten
St. John's East	James McGrath; 17,894; 65.42%	Gregory O'Grady; 9,197; 33.62%		David Jackman (Ind. Lib.); 263; 0.96%	James McGrath
St. John's West	William Browne; 15,953; 60.13%	Leonard Miller; 10,338; 38.97%	Esau Thoms; 240; 0.90%		William Browne
Trinity—Conception	Arthur Harnett; 8,897; 41.39%	James Tucker; 12,599; 58.61%			Leonard Stick†

== 1957 ==
The Progressive Conservatives regained the two seats on the Avalon Peninsula in the midst of a narrow federal victory under John Diefenbaker. Incumbent Liberal MP Chesley W. Carter was elected by acclamation, the only such instance in provincial history.

Electoral district	Candidates			Incumbent
Electoral district	Liberal	PC	CCF	Incumbent
Bonavista—Twillingate	Jack Pickersgill; 9,158; 87.18%	John Pinsent; 1,347; 12.82%		Jack Pickersgill
Burin—Burgeo	Chesley W. Carter; Won by acclamation			Chesley Carter
Grand Falls—White Bay—Labrador	Thomas Ashbourne; 11,681; 75.41%	George Broomfield; 3,810; 24.59%		Thomas Ashbourne
Humber—St. George's	Herman Batten; 10,272; 66.91%	Henry Butler; 5,080; 33.09%		Herman Batten
St. John's East	Allan Fraser; 9,073; 46.80%	James McGrath; 10,312; 53.20%		Allan Fraser
St. John's West	James Power; 8,449; 43.76%	William Browne; 10,539; 54.58%	Esau Thoms; 321; 1.66%	James Power
Trinity—Conception	Leonard Stick; 8,360; 69.28%	Arthur Harnett; 3,707; 30.72%		Leonard Stick

== 1953 ==
The Liberals won all seven seats and flipped the two Progressive Conservative ridings in the Avalon Peninsula. This was due in large part to a hard-fought campaign by Premier Smallwood on behalf of the Liberal candidates.

Electoral district	Candidates				Incumbent
Electoral district	Liberal	PC	CCF	Other	Incumbent
Bonavista—Twillingate	Jack Pickersgill; 10,072; 79.71%	Ted Russell; 2,564; 20.29%			F. Gordon Bradley†
Burin—Burgeo	Chesley W. Carter; 11,017; 88.16%	Grace Sparkes; 1,480; 11.84%			Chesley W. Carter
Grand Falls—White Bay—Labrador	Thomas Ashbourne; 13,653; 73.26%	Henry Hicks; 4,984; 26.74%			Thomas Ashbourne; Grand Falls—White Bay
Humber—St. George's	Herman Batten; 12,526; 77.62%	Bertram Butler; 3,612; 22.38%			William Kent†
St. John's East	Allan Fraser; 8,310; 42.70%	Gordon Higgins; 6,691; 34.38%		Peter Cashin (Ind.); 4,459; 22.91%	Gordon Higgins
St. John's West	James Power; 9,965; 52.47%	William Browne; 9,025; 47.53%			William Browne
Trinity—Conception	Leonard Stick; 8,814; 72.10%	Alfred Simmons; 2,704; 22.12%	Edgar Russell; 707; 5.78%		Leonard Stick

== 1949 ==
Much like the first provincial election, the results of Newfoundland's first federal election mirrored the results of the 1948 Newfoundland referendums. The Liberals easily won in the areas that had voted for Confederation, and the Progressive Conservatives won the two seats in the Avalon Peninsula which had voted for responsible government. Four of the candidates had previously served in the Newfoundland House of Assembly (Ashbourne, Bradley, Browne, Cramm), and three had been delegates in the Newfoundland National Convention (Ashbourne, Bradley, Higgins).

Electoral district	Candidates			Incumbent
Electoral district	Liberal	PC	CCF	Incumbent
Bonavista—Twillingate	F. Gordon Bradley; 9,744; 87.32%	Kenneth Dawe; 1,415; 12.68%		New district
Burin—Burgeo	Chesley W. Carter; 14,603; 92.28%	Grace Sparkes; 1,053; 7.72%		New district
Grand Falls—White Bay	Thomas Ashbourne; 12,301; 86.75%	James Pond; 1,879; 13.25%		New district
Humber—St. George's	William Kent; 11,930; 89.16%	Clayton Loughlin; 1,451; 10.84%		New district
St. John's East	Ambrose J. Shea; 7,913; 43.91%	Gordon Higgins; 9,912; 55.00%	William Gillies; 197; 1.09%	New district
St. John's West	Greg Power; 9,828; 48.72%	William Browne; 10,344; 51.28%		New district
Trinity—Conception	Leonard Stick; 10,929; 77.63%	Richard Cramm; 3,149; 22.37%		New district
