= Herman Maxwell Batten =

Canadian politician (1909–1991)

Herman Maxwell Batten B.A., B.Sc.
- Official 1966 portrait

Member of the Canadian Parliament for Humber—St. George's
- In office 1953–1968
- Preceded by: William Richard Kent
- Succeeded by: Riding abolished in 1966 and it was redistributed into Burin—Burgeo and Humber—St. George's—St. Barbe ridings

Personal details
- Born: August 4, 1909 Bareneed, Conception Bay, Newfoundland
- Died: October 17, 1991 (aged 82)
- Party: Liberal
- Occupation: school principal, teacher
- Website: Parliament of Canada biography

Herman Maxwell Batten (August 4, 1909 – October 17, 1991) was a Canadian politician, school principal and teacher.

Born in Bareneed, Conception Bay, Newfoundland, Batten was elected to the House of Commons of Canada in 1953 as a Member of the Liberal Party to represent the riding of Humber—St. George's and re-elected in the elections of 1957, 1958, 1962, 1963, and 1965; he was defeated in the election of 1968 in the riding of Humber—St. George's—St. Barbe. He was Deputy Chair of Committees of the Whole between 1963 and 1965 and Chairperson of the Special Committee on a Canadian flag. He was Deputy Speaker and Chairman of Committees of the Whole of the House of Commons between 1966 and 1968.
