= Newfoundland and Labrador Federation of Labour =

- Abbreviation: NLFL
- Founded: 1937; 89 years ago
- Headquarters: St. John's, Newfoundland and Labrador
- Location: Canada
- Members: ~65,000
- Key people: Jessica McCormick, President
- Affiliations: CLC
- Website: nlfl.nf.ca

The Newfoundland and Labrador Federation of Labour is the Newfoundland and Labrador provincial trade union federation for the Canadian Labour Congress. It was founded in 1937, and has a membership of 65,000.

The Newfoundland and Labrador Federation of Labour has been representing the interests of union members and workers since 1937. The federation is made up of nearly 30 affiliated unions, 500 locals and six district labour councils. They represent working women and men from every sector of the economy and from every community in the province.

The NLFL is dedicated to advancing the cause of working people and promoting a progressive civil society. They advocate for improved workplace rights and stronger laws including occupational, health and safety laws as well as workers’ compensation and employment insurance programs that are fair. They advocate better labour laws and strong, accessible public services such as universal health care, education, worker training, elderly home care, child care and early learning.

== Presidents ==
- Jessica McCormick (2022-present)
- Mary Shortall (2013–2022)
- Lana Payne (?-2013)

== See also ==
- Trade union centre
