= Joanne Thompson (politician) =

Canadian politician

The Honourable Joanne Thompson PC MP
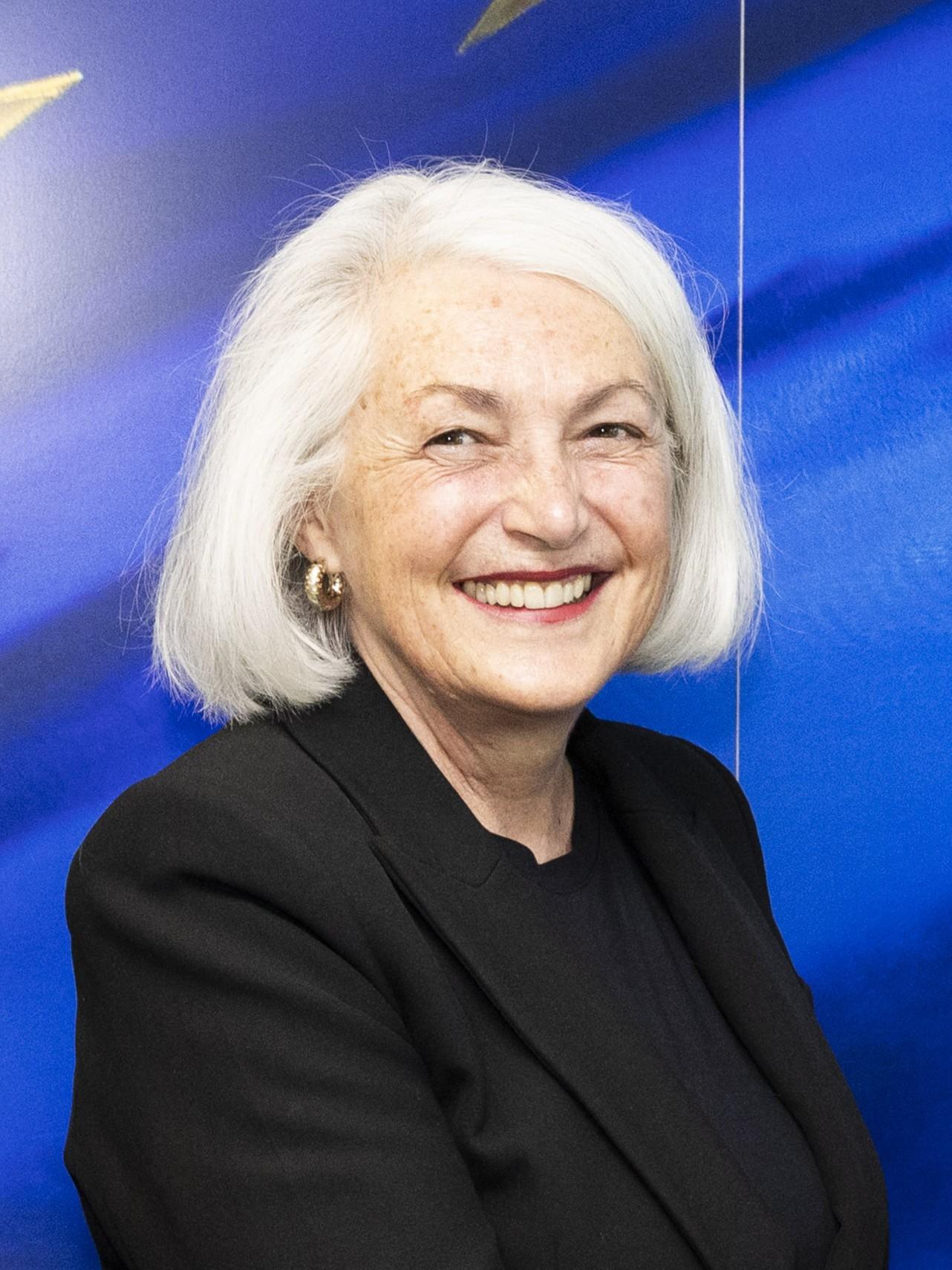
- Thompson in 2026

Minister of Fisheries (Note: Formerly titled Minister of Fisheries, Oceans and the Canadian Coast Guard)
- Incumbent
- Assumed office March 14, 2025
- Prime Minister: Mark Carney
- Preceded by: Diane Lebouthillier

Minister of Seniors
- In office December 20, 2024 – March 14, 2025
- Prime Minister: Justin Trudeau
- Preceded by: Steven MacKinnon
- Succeeded by: Stephanie McLean

Member of Parliament for St. John's East
- Incumbent
- Assumed office September 20, 2021
- Preceded by: Jack Harris

Personal details
- Party: Liberal
- Children: 3
- Education: Athabasca University; University of Fredericton

Joanne Thompson PC MP is a Canadian politician who serves as the Minister of Fisheries and the Member of Parliament for the riding of St. John's East since 2021. A member of the Liberal Party, she has served as the Minister of Seniors and Minister of Fisheries in the cabinets of Justin Trudeau and Mark Carney.

== Early life ==
Joanne Thompson was born in St. John's, Newfoundland and Labrador. She married and is the mother of three children. In the 1970s she was trained as a nurse. She graduated from Athabasca University with a bachelor's degree in nursing and from the University of Fredericton with a Master of Business Administration degree.

== Career ==
Jack Harris, who represented St. John's East multiple times starting 1987, declined to seek reelection in the 2021 election. In the 2021 and 2025 elections Thompson was a successful Liberal candidate in St. John's East. She was the first Liberal to win reelection in the riding since the 1960s.

From 2021 to 2023, Thompson was a member of the Government Operations and Estimates, and Environment and Sustainable Development committees. From 2023 to 2025, she was a member of the Finance committee. She was the co-chair of the Women's Caucus. Thompson supported Carney during the 2025 Liberal leadership election.

Thompson was the Minister of Seniors in the cabinet of Justin Trudeau from 20 December 2024 to 13 March 2025, and has been the Minister of Fisheries in the cabinet of Mark Carney since 14 March 2025. In 2025, she doubled the allowable catch of cod off the coast of Newfoundland and Labrador from 18,000 tonnes to 38,000 tonnes. She denied Marineland of Canada's request to export its 30 beluga whales to a theme park in China, stating that it was not in line with the Fisheries Act's regulations to protect marine mammals from exploitation. However, on January 26, 2026, she gave "conditional approval" to Marineland to export its remaining 30 belugas and 4 dolphins to several institutions in the United States. Before final approval is given, Marineland will need to provide a complete travel plan and confirm precisely which animals are going to which facilities, as well as receive confirmation from accredited veterinarians that each animal is safe to be transported. Marineland had stated that if the government had denied the request for export permits it would proceed with a secondary plan to euthanize the animals.

== Personal life ==
At the time of the 2025 Canadian federal election, Thompson lived in Logy Bay-Middle Cove-Outer Cove.

== Electoral history ==
2025 Canadian federal election: St. John's East
Party	Candidate	Votes	%	±%	Expenditures
Liberal	Joanne Thompson	28,681	62.28	+17.14	$85,697.61
Conservative	David Brazil	11,941	25.93	+7.84	$74,080.02
New Democratic	Mary Shortall	5,172	11.23	−23.61	$103,699.91
Green	Otis Crandell	159	0.35	N/A	$543.97
Communist	Samuel Crête	98	0.21	N/A	$0.00
Total valid votes/expense limit		46,051	99.05	+0.15	$124,970.38
Total rejected ballots		440	0.95	–0.15	
Turnout		46,491	70.94		
Eligible voters		65,536			
Liberal notional hold		Swing		+4.65	
Source: Elections Canada
Note: number of eligible voters does not include voting day registrations.

2021 Canadian federal election: St. John's East
Party	Candidate	Votes	%	±%	Expenditures
Liberal	Joanne Thompson	17,239	45.16	+11.97	$71,466.38
New Democratic	Mary Shortall	13,090	34.29	–12.63	$65,576.70
Conservative	Glenn Etchegary	7,119	18.65	+0.59	$44,852.25
People's	Dana Metcalfe	723	1.89	–	none listed
Total valid votes/expense limit		38,171	99.23		$105,251.87
Total rejected ballots		296	0.77	–0.39	
Turnout		38,467	57.45	–10.20	
Registered voters		66,963			
Liberal gain from New Democratic		Swing		+12.30	
Source: Elections Canada

== Works cited ==
=== News ===
- "Liberals flip St. John's East, as Conservatives look to claim Coast of Bays-Central-Notre Dame". Canadian Broadcasting Corporation. September 20, 2021. Archived from the original on June 20, 2025.
- "NL MP Joanne Thompson named Minister of Fisheries and Oceans, Coast Guard". The Telegram. March 14, 2025. Archived from the original on June 20, 2025.
- Howard, Bailey (January 28, 2025). "N.L. cabinet minister Joanne Thompson endorses Mark Carney for Liberal leadership". CJON-DT. Archived from the original on June 20, 2025.
- Kilfoy, Cameron (April 4, 2025). "Meet the candidates running in St. John's East". The Telegram. Archived from the original on June 20, 2025.
- Kilfoy, Cameron (April 28, 2025). "'The work continues': Joanne Thompson re-elected in St. John's East". The Telegram. Archived from the original on June 20, 2025.
- Nicholson, Katie; Thomas, Carly (October 1, 2025). "Federal government denies Marineland request to export belugas". Canadian Broadcasting Corporation. Archived from the original on November 6, 2025.
- Smellie, Sarah (June 19, 2025). "Scientists question Ottawa more than doubling cod catch in Newfoundland and Labrador". St. Albert Gazette. Archived from the original on June 20, 2025.

=== Web ===
- "Joanne Thompson". Joanne Thompson. Archived from the original on June 20, 2025.
- "Roles - Hon. Joanne Thompson". House of Commons of Canada. Archived from the original on June 20, 2025.

Order of precedence
Preceded by David McGuinty as Member of the Cabinet	Order of Precedence of Canada as Member of the Cabinet	Succeeded by Shafqat Ali as Member of the Cabinet
