= James McGrath (Canadian politician) =

Canadian politician (1932-2017)

The Honourable James McGrath PC

8th Lieutenant Governor of Newfoundland and Labrador
- In office September 5, 1986 – November 5, 1991
- Monarch: Elizabeth II
- Governors General: Jeanne Sauvé; Ray Hnatyshyn
- Premier: Brian Peckford; Thomas Rideout; Clyde Wells
- Preceded by: Tony Paddon
- Succeeded by: Frederick Russell

Member of the Canadian Parliament for St. John's East
- In office June 10, 1957 – April 8, 1963
- Preceded by: Allan Fraser
- Succeeded by: Joseph O'Keefe
- In office June 25, 1968 – September 5, 1986
- Preceded by: Joseph O'Keefe
- Succeeded by: Jack Harris

Personal details
- Born: James Aloysius McGrath; January 11, 1932 Buchans, Dominion of Newfoundland
- Died: February 28, 2017 (aged 85) St. John's, Newfoundland and Labrador, Canada
- Party: Progressive Conservative
- Profession: Sales manager

James Aloysius McGrath, PC (January 11, 1932 – February 28, 2017) was a politician and the eighth lieutenant governor of Newfoundland, Canada.

== Early life ==
As a young man, McGrath was a member of the Responsible Government League which opposed Newfoundland becoming a province of Canada. Nevertheless, upon the Dominion's joining confederation in 1949, McGrath left to enlist with the Royal Canadian Air Force. He returned to Newfoundland in 1953 and became sales manager with radio station CJON. In 1955, he became secretary of the provincial Progressive Conservative Party association. In 1956, he ran unsuccessfully for the party in the provincial election.

== Federal politics ==
In 1957, McGrath entered federal politics and won a seat in the House of Commons of Canada in the that year's federal election under the Progressive Conservative banner in St. John's East. In 1962, McGrath became parliamentary secretary to the minister of mines and technical surveys, and served in that position until he was defeated in the 1963 election.

McGrath regained his seat in the 1968 election, and remained in parliament through five subsequent elections.

When the Progressive Conservatives formed the government following the 1979 election, prime minister Joe Clark named McGrath minister of fisheries and oceans. McGrath returned to the opposition bench when the Clark government was defeated in the 1980 election.

McGrath was not included in the cabinet when the Progressive Conservatives formed government in the 1984 election under Brian Mulroney. Instead, McGrath was appointed chairman of the Special Committee on the Reform of the House of Commons. The report he authored led to a number of procedural changes, including the introduction of election by secret ballot for the position of speaker of the House of Commons. Its recommendations also led to the formation of the Canadian Association of Former Parliamentarians, established in 1996. McGrath also served as chairman of the Standing Committee on Human Rights.

== Vice-regal career ==
In August 1986, McGrath left electoral politics to accept an appointment as lieutenant governor of Newfoundland. He retired from the position in 1991.

== Personal life and death ==
McGrath's daughter, Robin McGrath, is a poet and novelist.

McGrath died at home on February 28, 2017.

== Arms ==
Coat of arms of James McGrath
Notes The arms of James McGrath consist of: Crest Upon a helmet mantled Rose and Vert doubled Argent on a wreath Argent, Rose and Vert a demi-lion Or gorged with an antique crown pendant therefrom a chevron Gules bearing in its dexter paw a trefoil slipped Vert. Escutcheon Tierced in pale Rose Argent and Vert over all a representation of the mace of the House of Commons of Canada in bend Or between six crosses botonny two in pale per pale Rose and Vert two in fess Argent two in bend sinister counterchanged. Supporters Two Caribou Argent langued Gules attired and unguled Or. Compartment On a rock Proper rising from waves Azure crested Argent. Motto Melius Est Nomen Bonum Quam Divitiae Multae (Latin for 'It is better to enjoy a good name than great wealth') Other elements Maltese cross of the Sovereign Military Order of Malta
