= Norman Doyle =

Canadian politician

The Honourable Norman Doyle ECNL
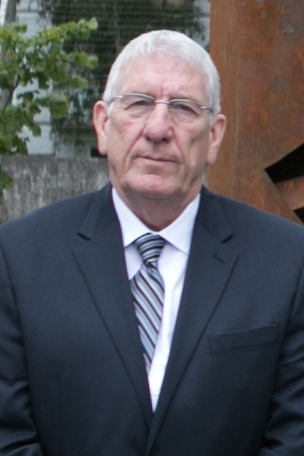
- Doyle in September 2017

Canadian Senator from Newfoundland and Labrador
- In office January 6, 2012 – November 11, 2020
- Nominated by: Stephen Harper
- Appointed by: David Johnston
- Preceded by: Bill Rompkey
- Succeeded by: Iris Petten

Member of Parliament for St. John's East (St. John's North; 2004–2006)
- In office June 2, 1997 – October 14, 2008
- Preceded by: Bonnie Hickey
- Succeeded by: Jack Harris

Member of the Newfoundland and Labrador House of Assembly for Harbour Main (Harbour Main—Bell Island; 1979–1985)
- In office September 18, 1979 – May 3, 1993
- Preceded by: William Doody
- Succeeded by: Don Whelan

Personal details
- Born: November 11, 1945 (age 80) Avondale, Dominion of Newfoundland (present day Newfoundland and Labrador, Canada)
- Party: Conservative
- Other political affiliations: Progressive Conservative (1997–2003)
- Spouse: Belle (Hannifan) Doyle
- Profession: Businessman

Norman E. "Blicky" Doyle (born November 11, 1945) is a Canadian businessman and politician in Newfoundland and Labrador. He was a member of the Senate of Canada from 2012 to 2020 and a Member of the Canadian House of Commons from 1997 to 2008.

== Political career ==
=== Provincial politics ===
Doyle was a member of the Newfoundland and Labrador House of Assembly from 1979 to 1993. He represented the provincial electoral district of Harbour Main sitting with the Progressive Conservative Party of Newfoundland and Labrador.

During his time in office he served multiple cabinet positions, Minister of Communications from 1982 to 1984 than ran the Municipal Affairs portfolio from 1984 to 1987 and then Transportation from 1987 to 1989 and finally as Labour Minister briefly in 1989.

=== House of Commons ===
He was a Conservative Party of Canada Member of Parliament in the House of Commons of Canada. He represented the riding of St. John's East from 1997 to 2008. He has also been a member of the Progressive Conservative Party of Canada from 1997 until the party's merger in 2003 with the Canadian Alliance.

He was formerly chair of the Commons standing committee on Citizenship and Immigration.

He was the caucus chair of both the Conservative Party and the Progressive Conservative Party. He was the whip and deputy whip of the Progressive Conservative Party and was critic of Citizenship and Immigration, Labour, Transport, Human Resources Development, and Human Resources and Skill Development.

=== Senate ===
Doyle was appointed to the Senate of Canada to represent the province of Newfoundland and Labrador on January 6, 2012, by Governor General David Johnston, on the advice of Prime Minister Stephen Harper. He rejoined the Conservative caucus with which he previously sat in the House of Commons. He reached the mandatory retirement age on November 11, 2020.

== Election results ==
2006 Canadian federal election
Party	Candidate	Votes	%	±%	Expenditures
Conservative	Norman Doyle	19,110	46.56	+5.16	$72,442
Liberal	Paul Antle	14,345	34.95	-1.70	$71,682
New Democratic	Mike Kehoe	7,190	17.52	-2.25	$14,072
Green	Stephen Eli Harris	402	0.98	-1.19	none listed
Total valid votes/Expense limit		41,047	100.0	–	$74,567
Total rejected, declined and unmarked ballots		111	0.27	-0.04	
Turnout		41,158	60.50	+4.88	
Eligible voters		68,026			
Conservative hold		Swing		+3.43	

2004 Canadian federal election
Party	Candidate	Votes	%	±%	Expenditures
Conservative	Norman Doyle	15,073	41.40	-12.50	$67,414
Liberal	Walter Noel	13,343	36.65	+4.07	$70,872
New Democratic	Janine Piller	7,198	19.77	+7.09	$17,703
Green	Scott Vokey	791	2.17	–	$564
Total valid votes/Expense limit		36,405	100.0	–	$72,255
Total rejected, declined and unmarked ballots		114	0.31		
Turnout		36,519	55.62	-1.47	
Eligible voters		65,660			
Conservative notional gain from Progressive Conservative		Swing		-8.28	
Changes from 2000 are based on redistributed results. Change for the Conservatives is based on the combined totals of the Progressive Conservatives and the Canadian Alliance.

2000 Canadian federal election
Party	Candidate	Votes	%	±%
Progressive Conservative	Norman Doyle	23,606	53.22	+14.24
Liberal	Peter Miller	13,835	31.19	+4.02
New Democratic	Carol Cantwell	5,395	12.16	-15.93
Alliance	Garry Hartle	1,144	2.58	-1.88
Independent	Judy Day	254	0.57	
Natural Law	Michael Rayment	122	0.28	-0.15
Total valid votes		44,356	100.00	
Changes for the Canadian Alliance from 1997 are based on the results of its predecessor, the Reform Party.

1997 Canadian federal election
Party	Candidate	Votes	%	±%
Progressive Conservative	Norman Doyle	17,286	38.98	-2.83
New Democratic	Ted Warren	12,460	28.09	+21.62
Liberal	Bonnie Hickey	12,048	27.17	-17.27
Reform	David Tulett	1,977	4.46	+1.56
Green	Jonathan C. Whalen	388	0.87	
Natural Law	Michael Rayment	191	0.43	-0.42
Total valid votes		44,350	100.00	

1989 Newfoundland and Labrador general election
Party	Candidate	Votes	%	±%
Progressive Conservative	Norman Doyle	4,123	65.59	+6.71
Liberal	Rod Fowler	1,485	23.62	+17.43
New Democratic	Gus Flannigan	678	10.79	-24.14
Total valid votes		6,286	99.46	–
Total rejected ballots		34	0.54	–
Turnout		6,320	78.65	-0.62
Eligible voters		8,036		
Progressive Conservative hold		Swing		+12.07
Source: Elections Newfoundland and Labrador

1985 Newfoundland and Labrador general election
Party	Candidate	Votes	%	±%
Progressive Conservative	Norman Doyle	3,784	58.88	-18.36
New Democratic	George J. Flaherty	2,245	34.93	+31.80
Liberal	Jerry J. Lewis	398	6.19	-13.44
Total valid votes		6,427	99.67	–
Total rejected ballots		21	0.33	–
Turnout		6,448	79.27	-2.40
Eligible voters		8,134		
Progressive Conservative hold		Swing		-25.08
Source: Elections Newfoundland and Labrador

1982 Newfoundland and Labrador general election
Party	Candidate	Votes	%	±%
Progressive Conservative	Norman Doyle	4,238	77.24	+16.57
Liberal	Joe Furey	1,077	19.63	-11.70
New Democratic	Bill Healey	172	3.13	-1.29
Total valid votes		5,487	99.33	–
Total rejected ballots		37	0.67	–
Turnout		5,524	81.67	+5.75
Eligible voters		6,764		
Progressive Conservative hold		Swing		+14.14
Source: Elections Newfoundland and Labrador

1979 Newfoundland and Labrador general election
Party	Candidate	Votes	%	±%
Progressive Conservative	Norman Doyle	3,100	60.67	-5.29
Liberal	Thomas Moore	1,601	31.33	-2.71
New Democratic	Margaret Peddle	226	4.42	+4.42
Independent	Michael J. Laurie	183	3.58	+3.58
Total valid votes		5,110	99.51	–
Total rejected ballots		25	0.49	–
Turnout		5,135	75.92	+6.68
Eligible voters		6,764		
Progressive Conservative hold		Swing		-4.00
Source: Elections Newfoundland and Labrador
