= Nick Whalen =

Canadian lawyer and politician

Member of Parliament for St. John's East
- In office October 19, 2015 – October 21, 2019
- Preceded by: Jack Harris
- Succeeded by: Jack Harris

Personal details
- Born: June 6, 1973 (age 53) St. John's, Newfoundland and Labrador
- Party: Liberal
- Spouse: Sarah Noble
- Education: McGill University; Queen's University
- Profession: lawyer, engineer, patent agent

Nicholas Julian Whalen (born June 6, 1973) is a Canadian Liberal politician, who represented the riding of St. John's East in the House of Commons of Canada from 2015 until 2019. Whalen was defeated in the 2019 federal election by former New Democratic MP Jack Harris in a rematch of the 2015 election.

== Early life and career ==
Whalen's father, Norman Whalen, was president of the Newfoundland and Labrador Liberal Party in the 1980s, and managed Clyde Wells' 1989 election victory.

He attended Queen's University's engineering school, earning both undergraduate and graduate degrees in the field. He then earned an LLB degree in 2001 from the McGill University Faculty of Law.

Whalen practised law at the law firm McInnes Cooper, specializing in energy law, intellectual property, and corporate and commercial law. He was also, at the time of his election, the only qualified patent agent, and worked with a number of charitable organizations. He had previously served as the local Liberal Party treasurer.

== Federal politics ==
Whalen's election in St. John's East over the popular NDP incumbent, Jack Harris, was considered one of the biggest surprises of the 2015 federal election.

In October 2016, Whalen responded to comments over Twitter by Earle McCurdy about the protests opposing the Lower Churchill Project over concerns of methylmercury being spilled into Lake Melville. Whalen responded by tweeting that the methylmercury levels should be monitored and people should compensate when levels are high by eating less fish. Whalen later issued an apology for that comment.

Whalen was defeated in the 2019 federal election.

== Electoral record ==
2019 Canadian federal election: St. John's East
Party	Candidate	Votes	%	±%	Expenditures
New Democratic	Jack Harris	21,148	46.92	+1.63	none listed
Liberal	Nick Whalen	14,962	33.20	−13.54	none listed
Conservative	Joedy Wall	8,141	18.06	+11.52	$56,419.96
Green	David Peters	821	1.82	+0.71	$0.00
Total valid votes/expense limit		45,072	99.84		$101,886.12
Total rejected ballots		528	1.16	+0.91	
Turnout		45,600	67.65	-0.21	
Eligible voters		67,406			
New Democratic gain from Liberal		Swing		+7.58	
Source: Elections Canada

2015 Canadian federal election: St. John's East
Party	Candidate	Votes	%	±%	Expenditures
Liberal	Nick Whalen	20,974	46.73	+38.96	–
New Democratic	Jack Harris	20,328	45.29	-25.36	–
Conservative	Deanne Stapleton	2,938	6.55	-13.90	–
Green	David Anthony Peters	500	1.11	-0.02	–
Communist	Sean Burton	140	0.31	–	–
Total valid votes/expense limit		44,880	99.75		$198,664.41
Total rejected ballots		111	0.25		
Turnout		44,991	67.86		
Eligible voters		66,304			
Liberal gain from New Democratic		Swing		+32.16	
Source: Elections Canada
