= Ross Reid (politician) =

Canadian politician (born 1952)

The Honourable Ross Reid PC

Chief of Staff to the Premier of Newfoundland and Labrador
- In office August 6, 2013 – May 30, 2014
- Premier: Kathy Dunderdale; Tom Marshall
- Preceded by: Brian Taylor
- Succeeded by: Darrell Hynes

Ministers of Fisheries and Oceans
- In office June 25, 1993 – November 3, 1993
- Prime Minister: Kim Campbell
- Preceded by: John Crosbie
- Succeeded by: Brian Tobin

Minister for the Atlantic Canada Opportunities Agency
- In office June 25, 1993 – November 3, 1993
- Prime Minister: Kim Campbell
- Preceded by: John Crosbie
- Succeeded by: David Dingwall

Member of Parliament for St. John's East
- In office November 21, 1988 – October 25, 1993
- Preceded by: Jack Harris
- Succeeded by: Bonnie Hickey

Personal details
- Born: Ian Angus Reid; July 31, 1952 (age 73) St. John's, Newfoundland, Canada
- Party: Progressive Conservative
- Profession: Consultant

Ian Angus "Ross" Reid PC (born July 31, 1952) is a former Canadian politician who most recently served as the Chief of Staff to Newfoundland and Labrador Premiers Kathy Dunderdale and Tom Marshall. Reid is a former Progressive Conservative member of Parliament who served as the Minister of Fisheries and Oceans and Minister for the Atlantic Canada Opportunities Agency under Prime Minister Kim Campbell.

== Political career ==
A consultant, Reid has been active with the Progressive Conservative Party of Canada since 1975. During the government of Prime Minister Brian Mulroney, he served as chief of staff to the Minister of Finance, and as an advisor to the Prime Minister.

In September 1988, Reid defeated former provincial cabinet minister Jim Morgan for the Progressive Conservative nomination in St. John's East for the 1988 federal election. On November 21, 1988, he won the seat, defeating New Democrat incumbent Jack Harris.

He became Parliamentary Secretary to the Minister of Fisheries and Oceans in 1989, and Parliamentary Secretary to the Minister of Indian Affairs and Northern Development in 1991.

When Kim Campbell succeeded Mulroney as prime minister in 1993, she brought Reid into Cabinet as Minister of Fisheries and Oceans and Minister for the Atlantic Canada Opportunities Agency. However, both he and the Campbell government went down to defeat in the subsequent 1993 federal election.

Reid remained active in the party as National Director of the federal Progressive Conservative party while Jean Charest was party leader.

== Career after politics ==
Since leaving the House of Commons, Reid has worked as an international consultant on human rights and democratic development, notably for the National Democratic Institute for International Affairs. He has worked in Iraq, Afghanistan, Bosnia and Herzegovina, Kosovo and Ukraine, among other countries. He currently serves on the board of directors of IMPACS, the Institute for Media, Policy and Civil Society.

In the 2003 Newfoundland and Labrador general election, Reid served as the Progressive Conservative Party's campaign chair. The party went on to form government under Danny Williams and Reid was appointed Deputy Minister to the Premier. In January 2007, he resigned his post as Deputy Minister to be re-appointed as the party's campaign chair for the 2007 election. The Progressive Conservatives were re-elected in the October election and in December 2007, Reid was appointed Deputy Minister for the Voluntary and Non-Profit Sector.

Reid resigned as Deputy Minister in June 2011 so that he could once again chair the Progressive Conservative Party's campaign in that year's general election. The party was re-elected for a third term in October and Reid was reappointed to his post as Deputy Minister for the Voluntary Non-Profit Sector in December. In January 2013, it was announced that Reid would be appointed Deputy Minister Responsible for the Provincial Population Growth Strategy. On August 6, 2013, Premier Kathy Dunderdale announced that Reid would become her new chief of staff. Reid replaced Brian Taylor, who had taken a leave of absence from the premier's office several weeks earlier.

25th Canadian Ministry (1993) – Cabinet of Kim Campbell
Cabinet posts (2)
Predecessor	Office	Successor
John Crosbie	Minister of Fisheries and Oceans; 1993	Brian Tobin
John Crosbie	Minister for the Atlantic Canada Opportunities Agency; 1993	David Dingwall
Parliament of Canada
Preceded by Jack Harris, NDP	Member of Parliament for St. John's East; 1988–1993	Succeeded by Bonnie Hickey, Liberal
