= Allan Fraser (Canadian politician) =

Canadian politician

Allan MacPherson Fraser (July 9, 1906 – November 16, 1969) was a Canadian, educator, politician and archivist. Fraser moved to Newfoundland in the 1920s to become a professor of history and head of the Department of History and Political Science at Memorial University College. He served on St. John's City Council from 1942 to 1944.

Fraser represented the electoral district of St. John's East in the House of Commons of Canada from 1953 to 1957, resigning from Memorial University to run for office. He was a member of the Liberal Party of Canada.

In 1958, Fraser was appointed Chief Archivist of the Provincial Archives of Newfoundland. During his tenure, public archives were reorganized and made available for public use.

Fraser was born in Inverness, Scotland and died in St. John's, Newfoundland.

== See also ==
- 22nd Canadian Parliament

Parliament of Canada
Preceded by Gordon Higgins	Member of Parliament for St. John's East; 1953-1957	Succeeded by James McGrath
