= Cape Spear—Mount Pearl—Paradise =

Federal electoral district in Newfoundland and Labrador, Canada

Newfoundland and Labrador electoral district
- Interactive map of riding boundaries from the 2025 federal election

Federal electoral district
- Legislature: House of Commons
MP
Tom Osborne
Liberal
- District created: 2003
- First contested: 2004
- Last contested: 2025
- District webpage: profile, map

Demographics
- Population (2016): 81,979
- Electors (2025): 69,102
- Area (km²): 503
- Pop. density (per km²): 163
- Census division: Division 1
- Census subdivision(s): St. John's (part), Paradise, Mount Pearl, Petty Harbour-Maddox Cove

Cape Spear—Mount Pearl—Paradise (formerly St. John's South, St. John's South—Mount Pearl, and Cape Spear) is a federal electoral district in Newfoundland and Labrador, Canada, that has been represented in the House of Commons of Canada since 2004.

== Demographics ==
Ethnic groups: 99.2% White
Languages: 98.7% English
Religions: 52.8% Catholic, 42.4% Protestant, 3.6% no affiliation
Average income: $25 379

== Geography ==
The district includes the south end of the City of St. John's, the City of Mount Pearl,the Town of Paradise and the Town of Petty Harbour-Maddox Cove.

The neighbouring ridings are Avalon and St. John's East.

== History ==
The electoral district of St. John's South—Mount Pearl was created in 2003: 95.1% of the population of the riding came from St. John's West, and 4.9% from St. John's East ridings. As of the 2012 electoral redistribution, 5% of this riding would be moved to St. John's East, and it would gain 3% from Avalon.

The 2012 federal electoral boundaries redistribution concluded that the electoral boundaries of St. John's South—Mount Pearl should be adjusted, and a modified electoral district of the same name will be contested in future elections. The redefined St. John's South—Mount Pearl had its boundaries legally defined in the 2013 representation order which came into effect upon the call of the 42nd Canadian federal election, on October 19, 2015.

Following the 2022 Canadian federal electoral redistribution, most of St. John's South—Mount Pearl was transferred to the new riding of Cape Spear. It gained Paradise from Avalon and St. John's East; lost Witless Bay, Bay Bulls and the Southlands and Goulds areas of St. John's to Avalon; and lost the remainder of St. John's Harbour, the Wishingwell Park area and the Ayre Athletic Field area to St. John's East.

The riding's name changed to Cape Spear—Mount Pearl—Paradise in 2026 as part of Bill C-25 of the 45th Canadian Parliament.

=== Members of Parliament ===
This riding has elected the following members of Parliament:

| Parliament | Years | Member | Party |
|---|---|---|---|
St. John's South; Riding created from St. John's West and St. John's East
| 38th | 2004–2006 | Loyola Hearn | Conservative |
St. John's South—Mount Pearl
| 39th | 2006–2008 | Loyola Hearn | Conservative |
| 40th | 2008–2011 | Siobhán Coady | Liberal |
| 41st | 2011–2015 | Ryan Cleary | New Democratic |
| 42nd | 2015–2019 | Seamus O'Regan | Liberal |
| 43rd | 2019–2021 | Seamus O'Regan | Liberal |
| 44th | 2021–2025 | Seamus O'Regan | Liberal |
Cape Spear
| 45th | 2025–2026 | Tom Osborne | Liberal |
Cape Spear—Mount Pearl—Paradise
| 45th | 2026–present | Tom Osborne | Liberal |

== Election results ==
=== Cape Spear ===
2025 Canadian federal election: Cape Spear
| Party | Candidate | Votes | % | ±% | Expenditures |
|---|---|---|---|---|---|
| Liberal | Tom Osborne | 31,388 | 68.25 | +13.53 | $87,754.29 |
| Conservative | Corey Curtis | 11,844 | 25.75 | +5.37 | none listed |
| New Democratic | Brenda Walsh | 2,446 | 5.32 | −17.81 | $0.00 |
| Animal Protection | Mike Peach | 170 | 0.37 | N/A | $4,451.67 |
| Green | Kaelem Tingate | 140 | 0.30 | N/A | $0.00 |
| Total valid votes/expense limit | | 45,988 | 99.03 | +0.10 | $126,725.23 |
| Total rejected ballots | | 451 | 0.97 | -0.10 | |
| Turnout | | 46,439 | 66.50 | | |
| Eligible voters | | 69,828 | | | |
| Liberal notional hold | | Swing | | +4.08 | |
Source: Elections Canada

2021 federal election redistributed results
| Party | Vote | % |
|---|---|---|
| Liberal | 19,467 | 54.72 |
| New Democratic | 8,227 | 23.13 |
| Conservative | 7,250 | 20.38 |
| People's | 631 | 1.77 |

=== St. John's South—Mount Pearl ===
2021 election by polling area

==== 2021 ====
2021 Canadian federal election: St. John's South—Mount Pearl
| Party | Candidate | Votes | % | ±% | Expenditures |
|---|---|---|---|---|---|
| Liberal | Seamus O'Regan | 19,478 | 56.17 | +5.04 | $92,438.10 |
| New Democratic | Ray Critch | 8,113 | 23.40 | -3.38 | $25,603.86 |
| Conservative | Steve Hodder | 6,447 | 18.59 | -0.51 | $8,313.27 |
| People's | Georgia Faith Stewart | 638 | 1.84 | +1.02 | $0.00 |
| Total valid votes/expense limit | | 34,676 | 98.82 | | $105,099.33 |
| Total rejected ballots | | 414 | 1.18 | -0.26 | |
| Turnout | | 35,090 | 52.63 | -8.37 | |
| Registered voters | | 66,677 | | | |
| Liberal hold | | Swing | | +4.21 | |
Source: Elections Canada

==== 2019 ====
2019 Canadian federal election: St. John's South—Mount Pearl
| Party | Candidate | Votes | % | ±% | Expenditures |
|---|---|---|---|---|---|
| Liberal | Seamus O'Regan | 20,793 | 51.13 | −6.73 | $58,125.56 |
| New Democratic | Anne Marie Anonsen | 10,890 | 26.78 | −9.98 | $25,130.37 |
| Conservative | Terry Martin | 7,767 | 19.10 | +14.53 | $56,978.54 |
| Green | Alexandra Hayward | 740 | 1.82 | +1.01 | $0.00 |
| People's | Benjamin Ruckpaul | 335 | 0.82 | – | none listed |
| Christian Heritage | David Jones | 141 | 0.35 | – | none listed |
| Total valid votes/expense limit | | 40,666 | 98.57 | | $100,487.58 |
| Total rejected ballots | | 592 | 1.43 | +1.13 | |
| Turnout | | 41,258 | 61.42 | −5.71 | |
| Eligible voters | | 67,170 | | | |
| Liberal hold | | Swing | | +1.62 | |
Source: Elections Canada

==== 2015 ====
2015 Canadian federal election: St. John's South—Mount Pearl
| Party | Candidate | Votes | % | ±% | Expenditures |
|---|---|---|---|---|---|
| Liberal | Seamus O'Regan | 25,992 | 57.86 | +29.16 | $124,533.70 |
| New Democratic | Ryan Cleary | 16,467 | 36.76 | –9.58 | $98,225.69 |
| Conservative | Marek Krol | 2,047 | 4.57 | –19.64 | $24,331.40 |
| Green | Jackson McLean | 365 | 0.81 | +0.09 | – |
| Total valid votes/expense limit | | 44,801 | 100.00 | | $201,093.98 |
| Total rejected ballots | | 133 | 0.30 | | |
| Turnout | | 44,934 | 67.13 | | |
| Eligible voters | | 66,936 | | | |
| Liberal gain from New Democratic | | Swing | | +19.37 | |
Source: Elections Canada

2011 federal election redistributed results
| Party | Vote | % |
|---|---|---|
| New Democratic | 17,925 | 46.34 |
| Liberal | 11,104 | 28.70 |
| Conservative | 9,366 | 24.21 |
| Green | 280 | 0.72 |
| Others | 9 | 0.02 |

==== 2011 ====
2011 Canadian federal election: St. John's South—Mount Pearl
| Party | Candidate | Votes | % | ±% | Expenditures |
|---|---|---|---|---|---|
| New Democratic | Ryan Cleary | 18,681 | 47.92 | +7.36 | $67,211.17 |
| Liberal | Siobhán Coady | 11,130 | 28.55 | -14.77 | $81,760.42 |
| Conservative | Loyola Sullivan | 8,883 | 22.79 | +10.24 | $78,347.37 |
| Green | Rick Austin | 291 | 0.75 | -1.11 | none listed |
| Total valid votes/expense limit | | 38,985 | 100.0 | – | $82,628.65 |
| Total rejected, declined and unmarked ballots | | 108 | 0.28 | +0.01 | |
| Turnout | | 39,093 | 58.97 | +7.02 | |
| Eligible voters | | 66,294 | | | |
| New Democratic gain from Liberal | | Swing | | +11.06 | |

==== 2008 ====
2008 Canadian federal election: St. John's South—Mount Pearl
| Party | Candidate | Votes | % | ±% | Expenditures |
|---|---|---|---|---|---|
| Liberal | Siobhán Coady | 14,920 | 43.32 | +10.32 | $63,155.64 |
| New Democratic | Ryan Cleary | 13,971 | 40.56 | +18.87 | $18,947.03 |
| Conservative | Merv Wiseman | 4,324 | 12.55 | -32.13 | $63,115.88 |
| Green | Ted Warren | 643 | 1.86 | +1.23 | $172.03 |
| Newfoundland and Labrador First | Greg Byrne | 402 | 1.16 | – | $2,908.17 |
| Independent | Terry Christopher Butler | 179 | 0.51 | – | none listed |
| Total valid votes/expense limit | | 34,439 | 100.0 | – | $80,167 |
| Total rejected, declined and unmarked ballots | | 92 | 0.27 | -0.06 | |
| Turnout | | 34,531 | 51.95 | | |
| Eligible voters | | 66,467 | | | |
| Liberal gain from Conservative | | Swing | | -4.28 | |

==== 2006 ====
2006 Canadian federal election: St. John's South—Mount Pearl
| Party | Candidate | Votes | % | ±% | Expenditures |
|---|---|---|---|---|---|
| Conservative | Loyola Hearn | 16,644 | 44.68 | +5.11 | $67,639.04 |
| Liberal | Siobhán Coady | 12,295 | 33.00 | -2.26 | $68,791.05 |
| New Democratic | Peg Norman | 8,079 | 21.69 | -2.02 | $40,492.63 |
| Green | Barry Crozier | 235 | 0.63 | -0.83 | none listed |
| Total valid votes/expense limit | | 37,253 | 100.0 | – | $73,776 |
| Total rejected, declined and unmarked ballots | | 124 | 0.33 | +0.03 | |
| Turnout | | 37,371 | 57.90 | +5.42 | |
| Eligible voters | | 64,543 | | | |
| Conservative hold | | Swing | | +3.68 | |

=== St. John's South ===
Graph of election results in St. John's South (minor parties that never got 2% of the vote or didn't run consistently are omitted) View source data.

==== 2004 ====
2004 Canadian federal election: St. John's South—Mount Pearl
| Party | Candidate | Votes | % | ±% | Expenditures |
|---|---|---|---|---|---|
| Conservative | Loyola Hearn | 13,330 | 39.57 | -16.27 | $63,090.26 |
| Liberal | Siobhán Coady | 11,879 | 35.26 | +4.91 | $63,121.27 |
| New Democratic | Peg Norman | 7989 | 23.71 | +10.31 | $36,839.75 |
| Green | Steve Willcott | 493 | 1.46 | – | $184.24 |
| Total valid votes/expense limit | | 33,691 | 100.0 | – | $72,104 |
| Total rejected, declined and unmarked ballots | | 103 | 0.30 | | |
| Turnout | | 33,794 | 52.48 | -1.38 | |
| Eligible voters | | 64,397 | | | |
| Conservative notional gain from Progressive Conservative | | Swing | | -10.59 | |
Changes from 2000 are based on redistributed results. Change for the Conservatives is based on the combined totals of the Progressive Conservatives and the Canadian Alliance.

2000 federal election redistributed results
| Party | Vote | % |
|---|---|---|
| Progressive Conservative | 18,610 | 53.65 |
| Liberal | 10,526 | 30.35 |
| New Democratic | 4,647 | 13.40 |
| Alliance | 761 | 2.19 |
| Others | 142 | 0.41 |

== Student vote results ==
Results of the Canadian student vote.

=== 2025 ===
2025 Canadian federal election
| Party | Candidate | Votes | % |
|---|---|---|---|
| Liberal | Tom Osborne | 1,391 | 44.63 |
| Conservative | Corey Curtis | 983 | 31.54 |
| Animal Protection | Mike Peach | 301 | 9.66 |
| New Democratic | Brenda Walsh | 278 | 8.92 |
| Green | Kaelem Tingate | 164 | 5.26 |
| Total votes | | 3,117 | 100.1 |
Source: Student Vote Canada

=== 2021 ===
2021 Canadian federal election
| Party | Candidate | Votes | % |
|---|---|---|---|
| Liberal | Seamus O'Regan | 880 | 41.65 |
| New Democratic | Ray Critch | 654 | 30.95 |
| Conservative | Steve Hodder | 384 | 18.17 |
| People's | Georgia Faith Stewart | 195 | 9.23 |
| Total votes | | 2,113 | 100 |
Source: Student Vote Canada

=== 2019 ===
2019 Canadian federal election
| Party | Candidate | Votes | % | ±% |
|---|---|---|---|---|
| Liberal | Seamus O'Regan | 1,498 | 38.03 | -16.91 |
| New Democratic | Anne Marie Anonsen | 944 | 23.97 | -8.42 |
| Conservative | Terry Martin | 574 | 14.57 | +9.41 |
| Green | Alexandra Hayward | 445 | 11.3 | 3.78 |
| People's | Benjamin Ruckpaul | 259 | 6.58 | New |
| Christian Heritage | David Jones | 219 | 5.56 | New |
| Total valid votes | | 3,939 | 100.0 | |

=== 2015 ===
2015 Canadian federal election
| Party | Candidate | Votes | % | ±% |
|---|---|---|---|---|
| Liberal | Seamus O'Regan | 1,257 | 54.94 | +22.45 |
| New Democratic | Ryan Cleary | 741 | 32.39 | -5.18 |
| Green | Jackson McLean | 172 | 7.52 | -4.9 |
| Conservative | Marek Krol | 118 | 5.16 | -12.34 |
| Total valid votes | | 2,288 | 100.0 | |

=== 2011 ===
2011 Canadian federal election
| Party | Candidate | Votes | % |
|---|---|---|---|
| New Democratic | Ryan Cleary | 614 | 37.57 |
| Liberal | Siobhan Coady | 531 | 32.49 |
| Conservative | Loyola Sullivan | 286 | 17.5 |
| Green | Rick Austin | 203 | 12.42 |
| Total valid votes | | 1,634 | 100.0 |

== See also ==
- List of Canadian electoral districts
- Historical federal electoral districts of Canada
