= Jack Harris (Newfoundland and Labrador politician) =

Canadian politician

Jack Harris KC
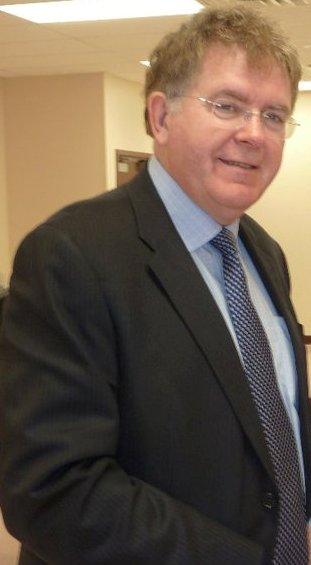
- Harris in January 2012

Shadow Minister for National Defence
- In office April 19, 2012 – November 19, 2015
- Leader: Thomas Mulcair
- Preceded by: David Christopherson
- Succeeded by: James Bezan
- In office May 26, 2011 – October 13, 2011
- Leader: Jack Layton; Nycole Turmel
- Preceded by: Dominic Leblanc
- Succeeded by: David Christopherson

Leader of the Newfoundland and Labrador New Democratic Party
- In office 1992–2006
- Preceded by: Cle Newhook
- Succeeded by: Lorraine Michael

Member of Parliament for St. John's East
- In office October 21, 2019 – September 20, 2021
- Preceded by: Nick Whalen
- Succeeded by: Joanne Thompson
- In office October 14, 2008 – October 19, 2015
- Preceded by: Norman Doyle
- Succeeded by: Nick Whalen
- In office July 20, 1987 – November 21, 1988
- Preceded by: James McGrath
- Succeeded by: Ross Reid

Member of the Newfoundland and Labrador House of Assembly for Signal Hill-Quidi Vidi (St. John's East; 1990–1996)
- In office December 11, 1990 – September 29, 2006
- Preceded by: Shannie Duff
- Succeeded by: Lorraine Michael

Personal details
- Born: John James Harris; October 27, 1948 (age 77) St. John's, Dominion of Newfoundland
- Party: New Democratic
- Spouse: Ann Martin
- Profession: Lawyer, journalist

John James "Jack" Harris KC (born October 27, 1948) is a former Canadian lawyer and politician from Newfoundland and Labrador. Harris served as the New Democratic Party (NDP) Member of Parliament for St. John's East. He represented the riding from 1987 to 1988 and again from 2008 to 2015, when he was defeated. He won the seat again in the 2019 federal election, becoming the only NDP member of the House of Commons from Atlantic Canada. He retired from politics in 2021. Harris is also the former leader of the Newfoundland and Labrador New Democratic Party (1992–2006).

== Politics ==
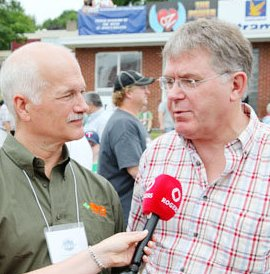
Harris with Jack Layton

Harris first became a member of the House of Commons of Canada after winning a by-election in the riding of St. John's East on July 20, 1987. Harris was the second NDP candidate ever elected to the House of Commons in Newfoundland and Labrador. He was subsequently defeated in the 1988 federal election.

=== NL NDP Leader ===
Harris was elected to the Newfoundland and Labrador House of Assembly in a 1990 by-election and was unopposed when he was elected to succeed Cle Newhook as leader of the provincial New Democrats at a party convention held November 1992. He was re-elected to the Legislature in the 1993, 1996, 1999, and 2003 elections.

In 1997, Harris ran for Mayor of St. John's losing narrowly to Andy Wells. He was supported by Danny Williams in this election who had a public dispute with Wells regarding a strike in 1994.

Harris retired from provincial politics in 2006 and was succeeded by Lorraine Michael as leader of the party as well as the Member of the House of Assembly for Signal Hill-Quidi Vidi. At the time of his departure, his former law partner Danny Williams was Premier of Newfoundland and Labrador.

=== Federal politics ===
In the 2008 federal election, Harris was again elected as the Member of Parliament for the riding of St. John's East. He received 74.1% of the vote, which was the fifth highest winning percentage in the election. Following the election, Harris was appointed as the party's Critic for National Defence, and, on several occasions, has been named one of "The Backbench Top Ten", for his performance in the House of Commons, by Maclean's Magazine. Harris was re-elected in the 2011 federal election. He lost the 2015 election in an upset to Liberal Party candidate Nick Whalen.

In May 2019, Harris successfully sought the NDP nomination for St. John's East for the 2019 federal election. Harris defeated Whalen in the 2019 election to regain his old seat. Harris did not run in the 2021 federal election.

Harris endorsed Alberta MP Heather McPherson in the 2026 New Democratic Party leadership election.

== Electoral history ==
2019 Canadian federal election: St. John's East
Party	Candidate	Votes	%	±%	Expenditures
New Democratic	Jack Harris	21,148	46.92	+1.63	none listed
Liberal	Nick Whalen	14,962	33.20	−13.54	none listed
Conservative	Joedy Wall	8,141	18.06	+11.52	$56,419.96
Green	David Peters	821	1.82	+0.71	$0.00
Total valid votes/expense limit		45,072	99.84		$101,886.12
Total rejected ballots		528	1.16	+0.91	
Turnout		45,600	67.65	-0.21	
Eligible voters		67,406			
New Democratic gain from Liberal		Swing		+7.58	
Source: Elections Canada

2015 Canadian federal election: St. John's East
Party	Candidate	Votes	%	±%	Expenditures
Liberal	Nick Whalen	20,974	46.73	+38.96	–
New Democratic	Jack Harris	20,328	45.29	-25.36	–
Conservative	Deanne Stapleton	2,938	6.55	-13.90	–
Green	David Anthony Peters	500	1.11	-0.02	–
Communist	Sean Burton	140	0.31	–	–
Total valid votes/expense limit		44,880	99.75		$198,664.41
Total rejected ballots		111	0.25		
Turnout		44,991	67.86		
Eligible voters		66,304			
Liberal gain from New Democratic		Swing		+32.16	
Source: Elections Canada

2011 Canadian federal election: St. John's East
Party	Candidate	Votes	%	±%	Expenditures
New Democratic	Jack Harris	31,388	71.22	-3.33	$68,045.84
Conservative	Jerry Byrne	9,198	20.87	+11.61	$85,207.91
Liberal	John Allan	3,019	6.85	-5.73	$53,539.40
Green	Robert Miller	467	1.06	-0.32	$335.14
Total valid votes/expense limit		44,072	100.0	–	$85,537.94
Total rejected, declined and unmarked ballots		136	0.31	+0.32	
Turnout		44,208	57.85	+0.96	
Eligible voters		76,424			
New Democratic hold		Swing		-7.47	

St. John's East - 2008 Canadian federal election
Party	Candidate	Votes	%	±%
New Democratic	Jack Harris	31,369	74.63%	
Liberal	Walter Noel	5,273	12.34%	
Conservative	Craig Westcott	3,872	9.21%	
Green	Howard Story	586	1.39%	
Progressive Canadian	Shannon Tobin	584	1.39%	
Newfoundland and Labrador First	Les Coultas	349	0.83%	

Signal Hill-Quidi Vidi, 2003 Newfoundland and Labrador general election
Party	Candidate	Votes	%	+/-
New Democrat	Jack Harris	2,456		
Progressive Conservative	Karen Carol	2,221		
Liberal	Ray O'Neil	391		

Signal Hill-Quidi Vidi, 1999 Newfoundland and Labrador general election
Party	Candidate	Votes	%	+/-
New Democrat	Jack Harris	2,179		
Liberal	Pete Soucy	2,010		
Progressive Conservative	Chris O'Brien	793		
Independent	Shaun Dunn	53		
Independent	Paul David Hillier	116		
Independent	John Whelan	48		

Signal Hill-Quidi Vidi, 1996 Newfoundland and Labrador general election
Party	Candidate	Votes	%	+/-
New Democrat	Jack Harris	2,800		
Liberal	Joan Cook	1,661		
Progressive Conservative	Cy Mills	902		
Terra Nova Greens	Jason Crummey	120		

St. John's East, 1993 Newfoundland and Labrador general election
Party	Candidate	Votes	%	+/-
New Democrat	Jack Harris	2,336		
Liberal	Joan Cook	1,728		
Progressive Conservative	Sean Fitzgerald	1,285		

St. John's East, Newfoundland and Labrador by-election, December 11, 1990
Party	Candidate	Votes	%	+/-
New Democrat	Jack Harris	1,977	49.24	
Liberal	Barbara Chalker	1,237	30.81	
Progressive Conservative	John Ottenheimer	801	19.95	

St. John's East - 1988 Canadian federal election
Party	Candidate	Votes	%	±%
Progressive Conservative	Ross Reid	21,503	44.13	+9.16
New Democratic	Jack Harris	17,198	35.30	-10.98
Liberal	Jim Baird	9,285	19.06	+1.84
Christian Heritage	Robert Tremblett	739	1.52	Ø
Total valid votes		48,725		

Canadian federal by-election, July 20, 1987: St. John's East
Party	Candidate	Votes
New Democratic	Jack Harris	15,842
Progressive Conservative	Tom Hickey	11,971
Liberal	Steve Neary	5,894
Rhinoceros	Peter Francis Quinlan	527
