= Humber—St. George's =

Former federal electoral district in Newfoundland and Labrador, Canada

Newfoundland and Labrador electoral district

Defunct federal electoral district
- Legislature: House of Commons
- District created: 1949
- District abolished: 1966
- First contested: 1949
- Last contested: 1965

Humber—St. George's was a federal electoral district in Newfoundland and Labrador, Canada, that was represented in the House of Commons of Canada from 1949 to 1968.This riding was created in 1949 when Newfoundland joined the Canadian Confederation.

It was abolished in 1966 when it was redistributed into Burin—Burgeo and Humber—St. George's—St. Barbe ridings.

It consisted of the Districts of St. George's-Port au Port, Humber, and St. Barbe and all the unorganised territory bounded on the North by the District of Humber, on the East by the District of Grand Falls, on the South by the District of Burgeo and LaPoile, and on the West by the District of St. George's-Port au Port.

== Members of Parliament ==
This riding elected the following members of Parliament:

Parliament	Years	Member	Party
Humber—St. George's
21st	1949–1953	William Richard Kent	Liberal
22nd	1953–1957	Herman Maxwell Batten	Liberal
23rd	1957–1958	Herman Maxwell Batten	Liberal
24th	1958–1962	Herman Maxwell Batten	Liberal
25th	1962–1963	Herman Maxwell Batten	Liberal
26th	1963–1965	Herman Maxwell Batten	Liberal
27th	1965–1968	Herman Maxwell Batten	Liberal
Riding dissolved into Burin—Burgeo and Humber—St. George's—St. Barbe

== Election results ==
1949 Canadian federal election
Party	Candidate	Votes
Liberal	William Richard Kent	11,930
Progressive Conservative	Clayton C. Loughlin	1,451

1953 Canadian federal election
Party	Candidate	Votes
Liberal	Herman Batten	12,526
Progressive Conservative	Bertram Butler	3,612

1957 Canadian federal election
Party	Candidate	Votes
Liberal	Herman Batten	10,272
Progressive Conservative	Henry A. Butler	5,080

1958 Canadian federal election
Party	Candidate	Votes
Liberal	Herman Batten	13,468
Progressive Conservative	Thomas J. Cahill	10,239

1962 Canadian federal election
Party	Candidate	Votes
Liberal	Herman Batten	12,771
Progressive Conservative	William J. Smith	7,887
New Democratic	Edward Finn	4,313

1963 Canadian federal election
Party	Candidate	Votes
Liberal	Herman Batten	13,605
New Democratic	Edward Finn	4,873
Progressive Conservative	Edna Murphy	4,295

1965 Canadian federal election
Party	Candidate	Votes
Liberal	Herman Batten	13,855
Progressive Conservative	James G. Tompkins	8,208

== See also ==
- List of Canadian electoral districts
- Historical federal electoral districts of Canada
