= Walter Noel =

Canadian politician

Member of the house of Assembly for Virginia Waters
- In office 1996–2003
- Preceded by: Office Established
- Succeeded by: Kathy Dunderdale

Minister of Mines and Energy
- In office February 17, 2003 – October 21, 2003
- Preceded by: Lloyd Matthews
- Succeeded by: Ed Byrne

Minister of Government Services and lands, And Minister of Intergovernmental Affairs
- In office February 13, 2001 – February 17, 2003
- Preceded by: Ernie McLean
- Succeeded by: George Sweeney

Walter Noel is a Canadian politician. He was first elected to Newfoundland's House of Assembly as the Member of the House of Assembly (MHA) for Pleasantville in 1989, and re-elected in 1993. Noel was re-elected with the assistance of local Nfld Reform Party of Canada organizers. Noel also worked on the campaign to stop the Wells administration from privatizing Nfld & Lab Hydro. During this campaign, Noel worked again with local Reform Party of Canada organizers, also with St. John’s deputy mayor at the time, Andy Wells, former PC leader, Lynn Verge, former NDP leader, Jack Harris, members of the local Nfld Arts community such as, Greg Malone and Anita Best, former head of Nfld & Lab Hydro, Cyril Abery and Nfld historian, John Fitzgerald. He was elected to represent the new Virginia Waters district in 1996 and 1999. Noel attempted two political comebacks, running for the Liberal Party of Canada unsuccessfully in the 2004 and 2008 federal elections.

== Education and experience ==
Noel holds a Bachelor of Arts in Economics from Memorial University of Newfoundland. He operated his own business prior to being elected, is a former president of the St. John's Downtown Development Corporation, and was a founding member of the Virginia Waters Conservation Society.

== Provincial politics ==
Under Premier Brian Tobin, Noel was appointed Minister of Intergovernmental Affairs and Minister of Government Services and Lands. As Minister of Government Services and Lands in the late days of the Tobin government, Noel appointed a Consumer Advocate for automobile insurance rate hearings, oversaw the establishment of the Petroleum Products Pricing Commission, and vigorously enforced consumer protection regulations and promoted e-commerce initiatives. Under Premier Roger Grimes, he was appointed Minister of Mines and Energy and served in this role until the Danny Williams' Progressive Conservatives defeated the Grimes Liberals in the general election of October 2003. Noel was personally defeated for re-election by PC candidate Kathy Dunderdale.

=== Role in NL Legislative spending scandal ===
In 2007, Noel was implicated in a report by the Auditor General, John Noseworthy, for billing the government over $12,000 which was spent on perfume, women's clothing, and alcohol.

== Federal politics ==
In 2004, Noel unsuccessfully ran as the Liberal candidate in St. John's North against Conservative incumbent Norman Doyle.

In 2008, Noel defeated St. John's realtor, Debbie Hanlon for the Liberal Party of Canada nomination in electoral district of St. John's East. In the general election held that October, Noel came in second to former provincial New Democrat leader, Jack Harris.
