= Joseph O'Keefe =

Canadian politician (1909–1995)

- Official 1966 portrait

Member of Parliament for St. John's East
- In office April 1963 – April 1968

Personal details
- Born: Joseph Phillip O'Keefe; 26 May 1909 St. John's, Newfoundland
- Died: 2 September 1995 (aged 86) St. John's, Newfoundland
- Party: Liberal
- Spouse(s): Margaret Walsh m 5 Oct 1943
- Profession: executive, manager/owner, supermarket, merchant

Joseph Phillip O'Keefe (26 May 1909 – 2 September 1995) was a Liberal party member of the House of Commons of Canada. He was an executive, manager/owner, supermarket and merchant by career. He was born in St. John's, Newfoundland.

He was first elected at the St. John's East riding in the 1963 general election, then re-elected for a second term in 1965. O'Keefe left Parliament after his defeat to James McGrath of the Progressive Conservative party in the 1968 election.
