= St. John's East (federal electoral district) =

Federal electoral district in Newfoundland and Labrador, Canada

Newfoundland and Labrador electoral district
- Interactive map of riding boundaries from the 2025 federal election

Federal electoral district
- Legislature: House of Commons
MP
Joanne Thompson
Liberal
- District created: 1949
- First contested: 1949
- Last contested: 2025
- District webpage: profile, map

Demographics
- Population (2016): 85,697
- Electors (2025): 65,253
- Area (km²): 363
- Pop. density (per km²): 236.1
- Census division: Division 1
- Census subdivision(s): St. John's (part), Portugal Cove–St. Philip's, Torbay, Logy Bay-Middle Cove-Outer Cove, Pouch Cove, Wabana, Flatrock, Bauline

St. John's East (French: St. John's-Est; formerly known as St. John's North) is a federal electoral district in Newfoundland and Labrador, Canada, that has been represented in the House of Commons of Canada since 1949.

It covers a part of St. John's. For a brief period in 2003 and 2004, it was known as "St. John's North".

In the 2019 federal election, former NDP MP Jack Harris defeated incumbent MP Nick Whalen in a rematch of the 2015 election. Harris retired in 2021, and Liberal Joanne Thompson won the seat.

== Demographics ==
Ethnic groups: 89.3% White
Languages: 94.3% English, 4.3% Other
Religions: 36.2% Catholic, 28.5% Protestant, 24.4% No affiliation
Median income: $41 200

=== 2023 representation ===
According to the 2021 Canadian census

Languages: 92.1% English, 1.2% Arabic, 1.1% French
Race: 85.8% White, 3.5% Indigenous, 3.1% South Asian, 2.4% Black, 1.4% Chinese, 1.3% Arab
Religions: 70.2% Christian (36.2% Catholic, 14.4% Anglican, 9.0% United Church, 2.1% Pentecostal, 2.0% Methodist, 6.5% other), 3.3% Muslim, 24.4% none
Median income: $41,200 (2020)
Average income: $58,700 (2020)

== Geography ==
The district includes the extreme northeastern part of the Avalon Peninsula including the northern half of the City of St. John's, and the eastern half of the Town of Conception Bay South. It also includes Bell Island, Little Bell Island and Kelly's Island.

The neighbouring ridings are Avalon and Cape Spear.

== History ==
The riding was created when Newfoundland joined Confederation in 1949 and has historically been a conservative stronghold. St. John's East was won by Liberal Bonnie Hickey in 1993 election, who was defeated by Progressive Conservative Norman Doyle in the 1997 election. Doyle held the riding for the PCs and then the Conservatives, but stood down in 2008 and was replaced in a landslide by New Democrat, Jack Harris. Harris held the riding until his defeat in the 2015 election by Nick Whalen. That result was considered one of the biggest surprises of the 2015 election.

Following the 2012 electoral redistribution, 21% of the riding was moved into Avalon, and it gained 5% from St. John's South—Mount Pearl.

Following the 2022 electoral redistribution, the riding lost all of its territory in Paradise to Cape Spear, and gained the rest of St. John's Harbour, the Wishingwell Park area and the Ayre Athletic Field area from St. John's South—Mount Pearl.

=== Members of Parliament ===
This riding has elected the following members of Parliament:

Parliament	Years	Member	Party
St. John's East
21st	1949–1953	Gordon Higgins	Progressive Conservative
22nd	1953–1957	Allan Fraser	Liberal
23rd	1957–1958	James McGrath	Progressive Conservative
24th	1958–1962	James McGrath	Progressive Conservative
25th	1962–1963	James McGrath	Progressive Conservative
26th	1963–1965	Joseph O'Keefe	Liberal
27th	1965–1968	Joseph O'Keefe	Liberal
28th	1968–1972	James McGrath	Progressive Conservative
29th	1972–1974	James McGrath	Progressive Conservative
30th	1974–1979	James McGrath	Progressive Conservative
31st	1979–1980	James McGrath	Progressive Conservative
32nd	1980–1984	James McGrath	Progressive Conservative
33rd	1984–1986	James McGrath	Progressive Conservative
33rd	1987–1988	Jack Harris	New Democratic
34th	1988–1993	Ross Reid	Progressive Conservative
35th	1993–1997	Bonnie Hickey	Liberal
36th	1997–2000	Norman Doyle	Progressive Conservative
37th	2000–2003	Norman Doyle	Progressive Conservative
37th	2003–2004	Norman Doyle	Conservative
St. John's North
38th	2004–2006	Norman Doyle	Conservative
St. John's East
39th	2006–2008	Norman Doyle	Conservative
40th	2008–2011	Jack Harris	New Democratic
41st	2011–2015	Jack Harris	New Democratic
42nd	2015–2019	Nick Whalen	Liberal
43rd	2019–2021	Jack Harris	New Democratic
44th	2021–2025	Joanne Thompson	Liberal
45th	2025–present	Joanne Thompson	Liberal

== Election results ==
Graph of election results in St. John's East and St. John's North (minor parties that never got 2% of the vote or didn't run consistently are omitted) View source data.

=== St. John's East (2006–present) ===
Graph of election results in St. John's East (minor parties that never got 2% of the vote or didn't run consistently are omitted) View source data.

==== 2025 ====
2025 Canadian federal election
Party	Candidate	Votes	%	±%	Expenditures
Liberal	Joanne Thompson	28,681	62.28	+17.14	$85,697.61
Conservative	David Brazil	11,941	25.93	+7.84	$74,080.02
New Democratic	Mary Shortall	5,172	11.23	−23.61	$103,699.91
Green	Otis Crandell	159	0.35	N/A	$543.97
Communist	Samuel Crête	98	0.21	N/A	$0.00
Total valid votes/expense limit		46,051	99.05	+0.15	$124,970.38
Total rejected ballots		440	0.95	–0.15	
Turnout		46,491	70.94		
Eligible voters		65,536			
Liberal notional hold		Swing		+4.65	
Source: Elections Canada
Note: number of eligible voters does not include voting day registrations.

==== 2021 ====
2021 federal election redistributed results
Party	Vote	%
Liberal	16,741	45.14
New Democratic	12,920	34.84
Conservative	6,709	18.09
People's	718	1.94

2021 election by polling area

2021 Canadian federal election
Party	Candidate	Votes	%	±%	Expenditures
Liberal	Joanne Thompson	17,239	45.16	+11.97	$71,466.38
New Democratic	Mary Shortall	13,090	34.29	–12.63	$65,576.70
Conservative	Glenn Etchegary	7,119	18.65	+0.59	$44,852.25
People's	Dana Metcalfe	723	1.89	–	none listed
Total valid votes/expense limit		38,171	99.23		$105,251.87
Total rejected ballots		296	0.77	–0.39	
Turnout		38,467	57.45	–10.20	
Registered voters		66,963			
Liberal gain from New Democratic		Swing		+12.30	
Source: Elections Canada

==== 2019 ====
2019 Canadian federal election
Party	Candidate	Votes	%	±%	Expenditures
New Democratic	Jack Harris	21,148	46.92	+1.63	none listed
Liberal	Nick Whalen	14,962	33.20	−13.54	none listed
Conservative	Joedy Wall	8,141	18.06	+11.52	$56,419.96
Green	David Peters	821	1.82	+0.71	$0.00
Total valid votes/expense limit		45,072	99.84		$101,886.12
Total rejected ballots		528	1.16	+0.91	
Turnout		45,600	67.65	-0.21	
Eligible voters		67,406			
New Democratic gain from Liberal		Swing		+7.58	
Source: Elections Canada

==== 2015 ====
2015 Canadian federal election
Party	Candidate	Votes	%	±%	Expenditures
Liberal	Nick Whalen	20,974	46.73	+38.96	–
New Democratic	Jack Harris	20,328	45.29	-25.36	–
Conservative	Deanne Stapleton	2,938	6.55	-13.90	–
Green	David Anthony Peters	500	1.11	-0.02	–
Communist	Sean Burton	140	0.31	–	–
Total valid votes/expense limit		44,880	99.75		$198,664.41
Total rejected ballots		111	0.25		
Turnout		44,991	67.86		
Eligible voters		66,304			
Liberal gain from New Democratic		Swing		+32.16	
Source: Elections Canada

2011 federal election redistributed results
Party	Vote	%
New Democratic	26,042	70.65
Conservative	7,538	20.45
Liberal	2,863	7.77
Green	415	1.13

==== 2011 ====
2011 Canadian federal election
Party	Candidate	Votes	%	±%	Expenditures
New Democratic	Jack Harris	31,388	71.22	-3.33	$68,045.84
Conservative	Jerry Byrne	9,198	20.87	+11.61	$85,207.91
Liberal	John Allan	3,019	6.85	-5.73	$53,539.40
Green	Robert Miller	467	1.06	-0.32	$335.14
Total valid votes/Expense limit		44,072	100.0	–	$85,537.94
Total rejected, declined and unmarked ballots		136	0.31	+0.32	
Turnout		44,208	57.85	+0.96	
Eligible voters		76,424			
New Democratic hold		Swing		-7.47	

==== 2008 ====
2008 Canadian federal election
Party	Candidate	Votes	%	±%	Expenditures
New Democratic	Jack Harris	30,881	74.55	+57.03	$78,829
Liberal	Walter Noel	5,211	12.58	-22.37	$51,030
Conservative	Craig Westcott	3,836	9.26	-37.30	$79,772
Progressive Canadian	Shannon Tobin	578	1.40	–	none listed
Green	Howard Story	570	1.38	+0.40	none listed
Newfoundland and Labrador First	Les Coultas	347	0.84	–	none listed
Total valid votes/Expense limit		41,423	100.0	$81,734	
Total rejected, declined and unmarked ballots		137	0.33	-0.06	
Turnout		41,560	56.89	-4.6	
Eligible voters		73,053			
New Democratic gain from Conservative		Swing		+39.70	

==== 2006 ====
2006 Canadian federal election
Party	Candidate	Votes	%	±%	Expenditures
Conservative	Norman Doyle	19,110	46.56	+5.16	$72,442
Liberal	Paul Antle	14,345	34.95	-1.70	$71,682
New Democratic	Mike Kehoe	7,190	17.52	-2.25	$14,072
Green	Stephen Eli Harris	402	0.98	-1.19	none listed
Total valid votes/Expense limit		41,047	100.0	–	$74,567
Total rejected, declined and unmarked ballots		111	0.27	-0.04	
Turnout		41,158	60.50	+4.88	
Eligible voters		68,026			
Conservative hold		Swing		+3.43	

=== St. John's North (2004–2006) ===
Graph of election results in St. John's North (minor parties that never got 2% of the vote or didn't run consistently are omitted) View source data.

==== 2004 ====
2004 Canadian federal election
Party	Candidate	Votes	%	±%	Expenditures
Conservative	Norman Doyle	15,073	41.40	-12.50	$67,414
Liberal	Walter Noel	13,343	36.65	+4.07	$70,872
New Democratic	Janine Piller	7,198	19.77	+7.09	$17,703
Green	Scott Vokey	791	2.17	–	$564
Total valid votes/Expense limit		36,405	100.0	–	$72,255
Total rejected, declined and unmarked ballots		114	0.31		
Turnout		36,519	55.62	-1.47	
Eligible voters		65,660			
Conservative notional gain from Progressive Conservative		Swing		-8.28	
Changes from 2000 are based on redistributed results. Change for the Conservatives is based on the combined totals of the Progressive Conservatives and the Canadian Alliance.

2000 federal election redistributed results
Party	Vote	%
Progressive Conservative	17,752	51.26
Liberal	11,282	32.58
New Democratic	4,391	12.68
Alliance	913	2.64
Others	290	0.84

=== St. John's East (1949–2004) ===
Graph of election results in St. John's East (minor parties that never got 2% of the vote or didn't run consistently are omitted) View source data.

==== 2000 ====
2000 Canadian federal election
Party	Candidate	Votes	%	±%
Progressive Conservative	Norman Doyle	23,606	53.22	+14.24
Liberal	Peter Miller	13,835	31.19	+4.02
New Democratic	Carol Cantwell	5,395	12.16	-15.93
Alliance	Garry Hartle	1,144	2.58	-1.88
Independent	Judy Day	254	0.57	
Natural Law	Michael Rayment	122	0.28	-0.15
Total valid votes		44,356	100.00	
Changes for the Canadian Alliance from 1997 are based on the results of its predecessor, the Reform Party.

==== 1997 ====
1997 Canadian federal election
Party	Candidate	Votes	%	±%
Progressive Conservative	Norman Doyle	17,286	38.98	-2.83
New Democratic	Ted Warren	12,460	28.09	+21.62
Liberal	Bonnie Hickey	12,048	27.17	-17.27
Reform	David Tulett	1,977	4.46	+1.56
Green	Jonathan C. Whalen	388	0.87	
Natural Law	Michael Rayment	191	0.43	-0.42
Total valid votes		44,350	100.00	

==== 1993 ====
1993 Canadian federal election
Party	Candidate	Votes	%	±%
Liberal	Bonnie Hickey	19,511	44.44	+25.38
Progressive Conservative	Ross Reid	18,355	41.81	-2.32
New Democratic	Bob Buckingham	2,839	6.47	-28.83
Reform	J. Leonard Barron	1,271	2.90	
National	Bill Vetter	1,211	2.76	
Natural Law	Michael Rayment	374	0.85	
Christian Heritage	Bob Tremblett	339	0.77	-0.75
Total valid votes		43,900	100.00	

==== 1988 ====
1988 Canadian federal election
Party	Candidate	Votes	%	±%
Progressive Conservative	Ross Reid	21,503	44.13	+9.16
New Democratic	Jack Harris	17,198	35.30	-10.98
Liberal	Jim Baird	9,285	19.06	+1.84
Christian Heritage	Robert Tremblett	739	1.52	
Total valid votes		48,725	100.00	

==== 1987 by-election ====
Canadian federal by-election, 20 July 1987 Resignation of James McGrath, 4 September 1986
Party	Candidate	Votes	%	±%
New Democratic	Jack Harris	15,842	46.28	+39.72
Progressive Conservative	Thomas V. Hickey	11,971	34.97	-43.33
Liberal	Steve Neary	5,894	17.22	+2.9
Rhinoceros	Peter Francis Quinlan	527	1.54	
Total valid votes		34,234	100.00	

==== 1984 ====
1984 Canadian federal election
Party	Candidate	Votes	%	±%
Progressive Conservative	James McGrath	30,866	78.30	+17.04
Liberal	Elizabeth Reynolds	5,644	14.32	-11.15
New Democratic	Christine Oliver	2,584	6.56	-5.60
Libertarian	Paul Paquet	325	0.82	
Total valid votes		39,419	100.00	

==== 1980 ====
1980 Canadian federal election
Party	Candidate	Votes	%	±%
Progressive Conservative	James McGrath	20,007	61.26	+2.83
Liberal	Ernest J. Bishop	8,320	25.47	+3.17
New Democratic	George P. Corbett	3,973	12.16	-7.11
Independent	Ann Margaret Barney	270	0.83	
Marxist–Leninist	Carol Hodge	91	0.28	
Total valid votes		32,661	100.00	

==== 1979 ====
1979 Canadian federal election
Party	Candidate	Votes	%	±%
Progressive Conservative	James McGrath	20,262	58.43	+2.25
Liberal	John Dustan	7,734	22.30	-11.48
New Democratic	Stratford G. Canning	6,684	19.27	+10.04
Total valid votes		34,680	100.00	

==== 1974 ====
1974 Canadian federal election
Party	Candidate	Votes	%	±%
Progressive Conservative	James McGrath	16,941	56.18	-4.29
Liberal	Norman Whalen	10,187	33.78	+0.06
New Democratic	George Corbett	2,783	9.23	+3.90
Independent	J. Wayne Saint John	242	0.80	
Total valid votes		30,153	100.00	

==== 1972 ====
1972 Canadian federal election
Party	Candidate	Votes	%	±%
Progressive Conservative	James McGrath	17,728	60.47	-0.46
Liberal	Margaret Dunn	9,887	33.72	-1.72
New Democratic	R. Graham Kelly	1,563	5.33	+2.12
Social Credit	Norman W. King	139	0.47	+0.05
Total valid votes		29,317	100.00	

==== 1968 ====
1968 Canadian federal election
Party	Candidate	Votes	%	±%
Progressive Conservative	James McGrath	18,153	60.93	+19.79
Liberal	Joseph O'Keefe	10,558	35.44	-20.53
New Democratic	Mary Summers	956	3.21	+1.13
Social Credit	Norman W. King	126	0.42	-0.39
Total valid votes		29,793	100.00	

==== 1965 ====
1965 Canadian federal election
Party	Candidate	Votes	%	±%
Liberal	Joseph O'Keefe	16,182	55.97	+4.48
Progressive Conservative	William Joseph Browne	11,894	41.14	-7.37
New Democratic	Cyril W. Strong	602	2.08	Ø
Social Credit	Norman William King	233	0.81	Ø
Total valid votes		28,911	100.00	

==== 1963 ====
1963 Canadian federal election
Party	Candidate	Votes	%	±%
Liberal	Joseph O'Keefe	14,768	51.49	+5.92
Progressive Conservative	James McGrath	13,911	48.51	-3.82
Total valid votes		28,679	100.00	

==== 1962 ====
1962 Canadian federal election
Party	Candidate	Votes	%	±%
Progressive Conservative	James McGrath	14,821	52.33	-13.09
Liberal	Brian White	12,907	45.57	+11.95
New Democratic	James J. Walsh	435	1.54	Ø
Social Credit	Eric Dixon Cave Hiscock	158	0.56	Ø
Total valid votes		28,321	100.00	

==== 1958 ====
1958 Canadian federal election
Party	Candidate	Votes	%	±%
Progressive Conservative	James McGrath	17,894	65.42	+12.22
Liberal	Gregory O'Grady	9,197	33.62	-13.18
Independent Liberal	David Ignatius Jackman	263	0.96	Ø
Total valid votes		27,354	100.00	

==== 1957 ====
1957 Canadian federal election
Party	Candidate	Votes	%	±%
Progressive Conservative	James McGrath	10,312	53.20	+18.82
Liberal	Allan Fraser	9,073	46.80	+4.1
Total valid votes		19,385	100.00	

==== 1953 ====
1953 Canadian federal election
Party	Candidate	Votes	%	±%
Liberal	Allan Fraser	8,310	42.70	-1.21
Progressive Conservative	Gordon Higgins	6,691	34.38	-20.62
Independent	Peter John Cashin	4,459	22.91	Ø
Total valid votes		19,460	100.00	

==== 1949 ====
1949 Canadian federal election
Party	Candidate	Votes	%
Progressive Conservative	Gordon Higgins	9,912	55.00
Liberal	Ambrose John Dalton Shea	7,913	43.91
Co-operative Commonwealth	William W. Gillies	197	1.09
Total valid votes		18,022	100.00

== Student vote results ==
=== 2025 ===
2025 Canadian federal election
Party	Candidate	Votes	%
Liberal	Joanne Thompson	1,817	42.82
Conservative	David Brazil	1,337	31.51
New Democratic	Mary Shortall	611	14.40
Green	Otis Crandell	298	7.02
Communist	Samuel Crête	180	4.24
Total votes		4,243	100
Source: Student Vote Canada

=== 2021 ===
2021 Canadian federal election
Party	Candidate	Votes	%
Liberal	Joanne Thompson	908	35.96
New Democratic	Mary Shortall	885	35.05
Conservative	Glenn Etchegary	493	19.52
People's	Dana Metcalfe	293	9.47
Total votes		2,525	100
Total votes		4,243	100
Source: Student Vote Canada

=== 2019 ===
2019 Canadian federal election
Party	Candidate	Votes	%	±%
New Democratic	Jack Harris	2,135	40.34	-1.87
Liberal	Nick Whalen	1,542	29.14	-13.46
Conservative	Joedy Wall	964	18.22	+11.45
Green	David Peters	651	12.30	+7.57
Total Valid Votes		5,292	100.0	–
Source: Student Vote Canada

=== 2015 ===
2015 Canadian federal election
Party	Candidate	Votes	%	±%
Liberal	Nick Whalen	648	42.60	+25.72
New Democratic	Jack Harris	642	42.21	-11.51
Conservative	Deanne Stapleton	103	6.77	-11.75
Green	David Anthony Peters	72	4.73	6.15
Communist	Sean Burton	56	3.68	–
Total Valid Votes		1,521	100.0	–
Source: Student Vote Canada

=== 2011 ===
2011 Canadian federal election
Party	Candidate	Votes	%
New Democratic	Jack Harris	815	53.72
Conservative	Jerry Bynre	281	18.52
Liberal	John Allan	256	16.88
Green	Robert Miller	165	10.88
Total Valid Votes		1,517	100.0
Source: Student Vote Canada

== See also ==
- List of Canadian electoral districts
- Historical federal electoral districts of Canada
