= Gordon Higgins =

Canadian politician

Gordon Francis Higgins (October 8, 1905 in St. John's, Newfoundland Colony – October 13, 1957 in St. John's, Newfoundland and Labrador) was a Canadian politician, who represented the electoral district of St. John's East in the House of Commons of Canada from 1949 to 1953. He was a member of the Progressive Conservative Party of Canada.

Son of William J. Higgins, Higgins was educated at St. Bonaventure College and was called to the Bar in January, 1931. In 1946 he was voted by the St. John's East district to become one of the three persons to represent that area at the Newfoundland National Convention. An anti-Confederate, he was sent to Ottawa in June 1947 as part of the group to identify options to join Canada. Unconvinced he advocated for Responsible Government during the referendums of 1948.

When Newfoundland and Labrador joined Canada, Higgins contested the district of St. John's East for the Progressive Conservative Party, which he won and became one of the first seven Newfoundland members in the House of Commons. His sentiment was strongly against confederation which was articulated by his speech to the House of Commons on March 6, 1950 where he says in part regarding transportation freight rates "if this agreement is not honoured by cabinet, I am resigning from this house and I am going back to Newfoundland where I shall endeavour, by all possible means, to have the province of Newfoundland secede from Confederation".

Higgins was an active community member where he served on many organizations:

- President, St. John's Amateur Athletic Association (1930–1950)
- First President, Newfoundland Tuberculosis Association (1944–1951)
- Awarded an Order of the British Empire, March 26, 1949
- President, Newfoundland Seaman's Association
- St. John's Royal Regatta Committee
- St. John's Rotary Club
- President, Benevolent Irish Society (1942–1954)

Parliament of Canada
Preceded by The electoral district was created in 1949.	Member of Parliament from St. John's East; 1949–1953	Succeeded by Allan MacPherson Fraser
