= Bonnie Hickey =

Canadian politician

Member of Parliament for St. John's East
- In office 1993–1997
- Preceded by: Ross Reid
- Succeeded by: Norman Doyle

Personal details
- Born: 5 March 1955 (age 71) St. John's, Newfoundland and Labrador, Canada
- Party: Liberal

Patricia "Bonnie" Hickey (born 5 March 1955) is a former Canadian politician. Hickey was a member of the House of Commons of Canada from 1993 to 1997.

== Biography ==
Hickey was born in St. John's, Newfoundland and Labrador. She was elected to represent the electoral district of St. John's East in the 1993 federal election as a member of the Liberal party. Bonnie Hickey served in the 35th Canadian Parliament after which she was defeated by Progressive Conservative candidate Norman Doyle in the 1997 federal election.

In 1998, she lost to Stephen LeDrew in her bid to become president of the Liberal Party. In the following year, she was employed by the province's tourism ministry as part of the staff handling the Viking anniversary and Year 2000 special events.

Hickey unsuccessfully ran for the provincial Liberal nomination in Signal Hill-Quidi Vidi for the 2015 election.
