= Mary Shortall =

Canadian politician (born 1958)

President of the New Democratic Party
- In office October 15, 2023 – March 28, 2026
- Preceded by: Dhananjai Kohli
- Succeeded by: Niall Ricardo

President of the Newfoundland and Labrador Federation of Labour
- In office 2013–2022
- Preceded by: Lana Payne
- Succeeded by: Jessica McCormick

Personal details
- Born: October 24, 1958 (age 67) St. John's, Newfoundland and Labrador, Canada
- Party: New Democratic Party
- Occupation: Politician trade unionist

Mary Shortall (born October 24, 1958) is a Canadian politician and labour activist. She served as president of the federal New Democratic Party from 2023 until 2026. She ran as the party's candidate for St. John's East in the 2021 and 2025 federal elections. She also ran in Gander—Grand Falls at the 1997 federal election, losing all 3 times.

Prior to politics, Shortall was the president of the Newfoundland and Labrador Federation of Labour from 2013 to 2022.

== Electoral record ==
2025 Canadian federal election: St. John's East
Party	Candidate	Votes	%	±%	Expenditures
Liberal	Joanne Thompson	28,681	62.28	+17.14	$85,697.61
Conservative	David Brazil	11,941	25.93	+7.84	$74,080.02
New Democratic	Mary Shortall	5,172	11.23	−23.61	$103,699.91
Green	Otis Crandell	159	0.35	N/A	$543.97
Communist	Samuel Crête	98	0.21	N/A	$0.00
Total valid votes/expense limit		46,051	99.05	+0.15	$124,970.38
Total rejected ballots		440	0.95	–0.15	
Turnout		46,491	70.94		
Eligible voters		65,536			
Liberal notional hold		Swing		+4.65	
Source: Elections Canada
Note: number of eligible voters does not include voting day registrations.

2021 Canadian federal election: St. John's East
Party	Candidate	Votes	%	±%	Expenditures
Liberal	Joanne Thompson	17,239	45.16	+11.97	$71,466.38
New Democratic	Mary Shortall	13,090	34.29	–12.63	$65,576.70
Conservative	Glenn Etchegary	7,119	18.65	+0.59	$44,852.25
People's	Dana Metcalfe	723	1.89	–	none listed
Total valid votes/expense limit		38,171	99.23		$105,251.87
Total rejected ballots		296	0.77	–0.39	
Turnout		38,467	57.45	–10.20	
Registered voters		66,963			
Liberal gain from New Democratic		Swing		+12.30	
Source: Elections Canada

1997 Canadian federal election: Gander—Grand Falls
Party	Candidate	Votes	%	±%
Liberal	George Baker	13,409	52.21	-2.81
Progressive Conservative	Todd Barker	8,652	33.69	+5.30
New Democratic	Mary Shortall	3,620	14.10	+4.13
Total valid votes		25,681		
