= William Richard Kent =

Canadian politician

Member of Parliament for Humber—St. George's
- In office June 1949 – June 1953

Personal details
- Born: William Richard Kent; 16 December 1905 St. John's, Newfoundland Colony
- Died: 1 January 1964 (aged 58) Corner Brook, Newfoundland and Labrador, Canada
- Party: Liberal
- Spouse(s): Avis Irene LeMessurier m. 8 February 1930
- Profession: barrister

William Richard Kent (16 December 1905 – 1 January 1964) was a Liberal party member of the House of Commons of Canada. He was a barrister by career.

Born in St. John's, Newfoundland, Kent was educated at Bishop Feild College in St. John's. From June 1935 to April 1938, he was a magistrate in the community of St. George's. From May 1942 to April 1945 he was Deputy Secretary of Justice for St. John's.

He was first elected to Parliament at the Humber—St. George's riding in the 1949 general election. After completing his only term in the House of Commons, the 21st Canadian Parliament, Kent did not stand as a candidate in the 1953 federal election.
