= Liberal Party of Canada candidates in the 2008 Canadian federal election =

This is a list of nominated candidates for the Liberal Party of Canada in the 40th Canadian federal election.

== Newfoundland and Labrador - 7 seats ==
Riding	Candidate's Name	Notes	Gender	Residence	Occupation	Votes	%	Rank
Avalon	Scott Andrews		M	Conception Bay South	Municipal Councillor	14,866	45.3%	1st
Bonavista—Gander—Grand Falls—Windsor	Scott Simms	incumbent MP	M	Bishop's Falls	Parliamentarian	20,089	70.3%	1st
Humber—St. Barbe—Baie Verte	Gerry Byrne	incumbent MP	M	Corner Brook	Parliamentarian	17,956	68.2%	1st
Labrador	Todd Russell	incumbent MP	M	Happy Valley-Goose Bay	Parliamentarian	5,426	70.3%	1st
Random—Burin—St. George's	Judy Foote	Former MHA for Grand Bank	F	St. John's	Parliamentarian	12,557	53.7%	1st
St. John's East	Walter Noel	Former MHA for Virginia Waters	M	St. John's	Economist	5,211	12.6%	2nd
St. John's South—Mount Pearl	Siobhán Coady		F	St. John's	Business Executive	14,920	43.3%	1st

== Prince Edward Island - 4 seats ==
Riding	Candidate's Name	Notes	Gender	Residence	Occupation	Votes	%	Rank
Cardigan	Lawrence MacAulay	incumbent MP	M	Midgell	Farmer	10,105	52.8%	1st
Charlottetown	Shawn Murphy	incumbent MP	M	Charlottetown	Parliamentarian	8,893	50.1%	1st
Egmont	Keith Milligan	Former Premier of Prince Edward Island	M	Tyne Valley	Teacher	8,055	43.6%	2nd
Malpeque	Wayne Easter	incumbent MP	M	North Wiltshire	Farmer	8,312	44.2%	1st

== Nova Scotia - 11 seats ==
Riding	Candidate's Name	Notes	Gender	Residence	Occupation	Votes	%	Rank
Cape Breton—Canso	Rodger Cuzner	incumbent MP	M	Glace Bay	Parliamentarian	17,447	48.1%	1st
Central Nova	NONE	No candidate due to deal between Stéphane Dion and Green Party leader Elizabeth May not to run candidates in each other's ridings.						
Cumberland—Colchester—Musquodoboit Valley	Tracy Parsons	Former leader of the Progressive Canadian Party	M	Bible Hill	V.P. Sales	3,344	8.5%	4th
Dartmouth—Cole Harbour	Michael Savage	incumbent MP	M	Dartmouth	Parliamentarian	16,016	39.5%	1st
Halifax	Catherine Meade	Cofounder of the Gay and Lesbian International Sports Association	F	Halifax	Lawyer	12,458	27.6%	2nd
Halifax West	Geoff Regan	incumbent MP	M	Bedford	Lawyer	17,129	41.6%	1st
Kings—Hants	Scott Brison	incumbent MP	M	Cheverie	Parliamentarian	16,641	44.2%	1st
Sackville—Eastern Shore	Carolyn Scott		F	Eastern Passage	Retired	5,018	12.7%	3rd
South Shore—St. Margaret's	Bill Smith		M	New Germany	Chiropractor	9,536	23.9%	3rd
Sydney—Victoria	Mark Eyking	incumbent MP	M	Millville	Parliamentarian	17,303	49.4%	1st
West Nova	Robert Thibault	incumbent MP	M	Lower Concession	Administrator	15,185	36.1%	2nd

== New Brunswick - 10 seats ==
Riding	Candidate's Name	Notes	Gender	Residence	Occupation	Votes	%	Rank
Acadie—Bathurst	Odette Robichaud		F	Inkerman Ferry	Stenographer	9,850	21.9%	2nd
Beauséjour	Dominic LeBlanc	incumbent MP	M	Grande-Digue	Parliamentarian	20,059	46.8%	1st
Fredericton	David Innes	CEO of the Greater Fredericton Airport Authority and chair of the New Brunswick Aerospace and Defence Association	M	Fredericton	Engineer	13,319	31.5%	2nd
Fundy Royal	Mark Wright		M	Sussex	Sales Representative	5,773	17.3%	3rd
Madawaska—Restigouche	Jean-Claude D'Amours	incumbent MP	M	Edmundston	Parliamentarian	16,266	47.4%	1st
Miramichi	Charles Hubbard	incumbent MP	M	Red Bank	Parliamentarian	10,590	37.0%	2nd
Moncton—Riverview—Dieppe	Brian Murphy	incumbent MP	M	Moncton	Lawyer	17,797	39.1%	1st
New Brunswick Southwest	Nancy MacIntosh		F	Hanwell	Political Advisor	5,863	19.6%	2nd
Saint John	Paul Zed	incumbent MP	M	Rothesay	Lawyer	13,285	38.1%	2nd
Tobique—Mactaquac	Sally McGrath		F	Taymouth	High School Teacher	6,773	21.5%	2nd

== Quebec - 75 seats ==
Riding	Candidate	Notes	Gender	Residence	Occupation	Votes	%	Rank
Abitibi—Baie-James—Nunavik—Eeyou	Mark Canada		M	Rivière-Héva	Entrepreneur	5,108	18.4%	3rd
Abitibi—Témiscamingue	Gilbert Barrette	former MP	M	La Sarre	Retired	9,055	20.7%	2nd
Ahuntsic	Eleni Bakopanos	former MP	F	Montreal	Political Counsellor	18,392	38.6%	2nd
Alfred-Pellan	Wilson Saintelmy		M	Laval	Businessman	15,594	29.3%	2nd
Argenteuil—Papineau—Mirabel	André Robert		M	Saint-André-Avellin	Secretary of the Treasury Board	9,984	18.2%	2nd
Bas-Richelieu—Nicolet—Bécancour	Ghislaine Cournoyer		F		Retired	7,987	16.28%	3rd
Beauce	René Roy		M	Saint-Jules	Farmer	5,270	10.3%	3rd
Beauharnois—Salaberry	Maria Lopez		F	Hemmingford	Interviewer	7,995	14.9%	3rd
Beauport—Limoilou	Yves Picard							
Berthier—Maskinongé	Jean-Luc Matteau							
Bourassa	Denis Coderre	incumbent MP						
Brome—Missisquoi	Denis Paradis	Former MP						
Brossard—La Prairie	Alexandra Mendès		F	Sainte-Catherine	Communications Agent	19,103	32.6%	1st
Chambly—Borduas	Gabriel Arsenault		M	Mont-Saint-Hilaire	Student	10,649	16.8%	2nd
Charlesbourg—Haute-Saint-Charles	Denise Legros							
Châteauguay—Saint-Constant	Linda Schwey		F	Outremont	Chartered Accountant	10,104	18.4%	2nd
Chicoutimi—Le Fjord	Mark Pettersen							
Compton—Stanstead	William Hogg							
Drummond	Jean Courchesne							
Gaspésie—Îles-de-la-Madeleine	Denis Gauvreau							
Gatineau	Michel Simard							
Haute-Gaspésie—La Mitis—Matane—Matapédia	Nancy Charest	Former MNA for Matane	F	Matane	Lawyer	11,368	35.6%	2nd
Hochelaga	Diane Dicaire							
Honoré-Mercier	Pablo Rodriguez	Incumbent MP						
Hull—Aylmer	Marcel Proulx	Incumbent MP						
Jeanne-Le Ber	Christian Feuillette							
Joliette	Suzie Saint-Onge							
Jonquière—Alma	Marc Dupéré							
La Pointe-de-l'Île	Oumy Sarr							
Lac-Saint-Louis	Francis Scarpaleggia	incumbent MP						
LaSalle—Émard	Lise Zarac							
Laurentides—Labelle	Pierre Gfeller							
Laurier—Sainte-Marie	Sébastien Caron							
Laval	Alia Haddad							
Laval—Les Îles	Raymonde Folco	incumbent MP						
Lévis—Bellechasse	Pauline Côté							
Longueuil—Pierre-Boucher	Ryan Hillier		M	Montreal	Lawyer	10,920	21.8%	2nd
Lotbinière—Chutes-de-la-Chaudière	Marie-Thérèse Hovington							
Louis-Hébert	Jean Beaupré							
Louis-Saint-Laurent	Hélène H. Leone							
Manicouagan	Randy Jones							
Marc-Aurèle-Fortin	Robert Frégeau							
Mégantic—L'Érable	Nicole Champagne							
Montcalm	David Grégoire							
Montmagny—L'Islet—Kamouraska—Rivière-du-Loup	Jean Bouchard							
Montmorency—Charlevoix—Haute-Côte-Nord	Robert Gauthier							
Mount Royal	Irwin Cotler	incumbent MP						
Notre-Dame-de-Grâce—Lachine	Marlene Jennings	incumbent MP						
Outremont	Sébastien Dhavernas,		M		Actor			
Papineau	Justin Trudeau	Educator and son of former Prime Minister Pierre Trudeau						
Pierrefonds—Dollard	Bernard Patry	incumbent MP						
Pontiac	Cindy Duncan-MacMillan							
Portneuf—Jacques-Cartier	Stephan Asselin							
Québec	Damien Rousseau							
Repentigny	Robert Semegen							
Richmond—Arthabaska	Gwyneth Grant							
Rimouski-Neigette—Témiscouata—Les Basques	Pierre Béland							
Rivière-des-Mille-Îles	Denis Joannette							
Rivière-du-Nord	Joao Neves							
Roberval—Lac-Saint-Jean	Louise Boulanger							
Rosemont—La Petite-Patrie	Marjorie Théodore							
Saint-Bruno—Saint-Hubert	Pierre Diamond		M	Boucherville	Teacher	11,755	22.2%	2nd
Saint-Hyacinthe—Bagot	Denise Tremblay		F	Varennes	Secretary	6,649	13.9%	4th
Saint-Jean	Claire Ste-Marie		F	Saint-Jean-sur-Richelieu	Secretary of Direction	9,430	17.7%	2nd
Saint-Lambert	Roxane Stanners		F	Montreal	Lawyer	12,383	28.5%	2nd
Saint-Laurent—Cartierville	Stéphane Dion	Party Leader						
Saint-Léonard—Saint-Michel	Massimo Pacetti	incumbent MP						
Saint-Maurice—Champlain	Ronald St.-Onge Lynch							
Shefford	Bernard Demers							
Sherbrooke	Nathalie Goguen							
Terrebonne—Blainville	Eva Nassif							
Trois-Rivières	Marcos G. Simard							
Vaudreuil—Soulanges	Brigitte Legault		F	Montreal	Professional	13,954	21.3%	3rd
Verchères—Les Patriotes	Francois Fournier		M	Montreal	Student	8,871	16.3%	2nd
Westmount—Ville-Marie	Marc Garneau	former astronaut						

== Ontario - 106 seats ==
Riding	Candidate's Name	Notes	Gender	Residence	Occupation	Votes	%	Rank
Ajax—Pickering	Mark Holland	incumbent MP						
Algoma—Manitoulin—Kapuskasing	Brent St. Denis	Incumbent MP						
Ancaster—Dundas—Flamborough—Westdale	Arlene MacFarlane							
Barrie	Rick Jones							
Beaches—East York	Maria Minna	Incumbent MP						
Bramalea—Gore—Malton	Gurbax Singh Malhi							
Brampton—Springdale	Ruby Dhalla	Incumbent MP						
Brampton West	Andrew Kania	Incumbent MP						
Brant	Lloyd St. Amand	incumbent MP						
Bruce—Grey—Owen Sound	Thomas Noble							
Burlington	Paddy Torsney							
Cambridge	Gord Zeilstra							
Carleton—Mississippi Mills	Justin MacKinnon							
Chatham-Kent—Essex	Matt Daudlin							
Davenport	Mario Silva	incumbent MP						
Don Valley East	Yasmin Ratansi	incumbent MP						
Don Valley West	Rob Oliphant							
Dufferin—Caledon	Rebecca Finch							
Durham	Bryan Ransom							
Eglinton—Lawrence	Joe Volpe	incumbent MP						
Elgin—Middlesex—London	Suzanne von Bommel							
Essex	Susan Whelan	former MP						
Etobicoke Centre	Borys Wrzesnewskyj	Incumbent MP						
Etobicoke—Lakeshore	Michael Ignatieff	Incumbent MP and Deputy Leader						
Etobicoke North	Kirsty Duncan							
Glengarry—Prescott—Russell	Dan Boudria							
Guelph	Frank Valeriote							
Haldimand—Norfolk	Eric Hoskins							
Haliburton—Kawartha Lakes—Brock	Marlene White							
Halton	Garth Turner	incumbent MP						
Hamilton Centre	Helen Wilson							
Hamilton East—Stoney Creek	Larry Di Ianni	Former Mayor of Hamilton	M					
Hamilton Mountain	Tyler Banham	The youngest federal Liberal candidate in Ontario						
Huron—Bruce	Greg McClinchey							
Kenora	Roger Valley	incumbent MP						
Kingston and the Islands	Peter Milliken	Incumbent MP & Current Speaker of the House of Commons						
Kitchener Centre	Karen Redman	incumbent MP						
Kitchener—Conestoga	Orlando da Silva							
Kitchener—Waterloo	Andrew Telegdi	incumbent MP						
Lambton—Kent—Middlesex	Jeff Wesley							
Lanark—Frontenac—Lennox and Addington	David Remington							
Leeds—Grenville	Marjory Jean Loveys							
London—Fanshawe	Jacquie Gauthier							
London North Centre	Glen Pearson	Incumbent MP						
London West	Sue Barnes	incumbent MP						
Markham—Unionville	John McCallum	incumbent MP						
Mississauga—Brampton South	Navdeep Bains	incumbent MP						
Mississauga East—Cooksville	Albina Guarnieri	incumbent MP						
Mississauga—Erindale	Omar Alghabra	incumbent MP						
Mississauga South	Paul Szabo	incumbent MP						
Mississauga—Streetsville	Bonnie Crombie							
Nepean—Carleton	Ed Mahfouz							
Newmarket—Aurora	Tim Jones	Former mayor of Aurora						
Niagara Falls	Joyce Morocco							
Niagara West—Glanbrook	Heather Carter							
Nickel Belt	Louise Portelance							
Nipissing—Timiskaming	Anthony Rota	Incumbent MP						
Northumberland—Quinte West	Paul Macklin	former MP	M					
Oak Ridges—Markham	Lui Temelkovski	Incumbent MP						
Oakville	Bonnie Brown	Incumbent MP						
Oshawa	Sean Godfrey							
Ottawa Centre	Penny Collenette							
Ottawa—Orléans	Marc Godbout							
Ottawa South	David McGuinty	Incumbent MP & brother of Ontario Premier Dalton McGuinty						
Ottawa—Vanier	Mauril Bélanger	incumbent MP						
Ottawa West—Nepean	David Pratt	Former MP						
Oxford	Martha Dennis							
Parkdale—High Park	Gerard Kennedy	Former Ontario MPP & Minister of Education						
Parry Sound-Muskoka	Jamie McGarvey							
Perth Wellington	Sandra Gardiner							
Peterborough	Betsy McGregor		F	Peterborough	veterinarian, researcher	18,417	31.60	2nd
Pickering—Scarborough East	Dan McTeague	incumbent MP						
Prince Edward—Hastings	Ken Cole							
Renfrew—Nipissing—Pembroke	Carole Devine							
Richmond Hill	Bryon Wilfert	incumbent MP						
St. Catharines	Walt Lastewka	former MP						
St. Paul's	Carolyn Bennett	incumbent MP, Former Cabinet minister and liberal leadership candidate						
Sarnia—Lambton	Tim Fugard							
Sault Ste. Marie	Paul Bichler		M	Sault Ste. Marie				
Scarborough—Agincourt	Jim Karygiannis	incumbent MP						
Scarborough Centre	John Cannis	incumbent MP						
Scarborough-Guildwood	John McKay	incumbent MP						
Scarborough—Rouge River	Derek Lee							
Scarborough Southwest	Michelle Simson							
Simcoe—Grey	Andrea Matrosovs							
Simcoe North	Steve Clarke							
Stormont—Dundas—South Glengarry	Denis Sabourin							
Sudbury	Diane Marleau	Incumbent MP	F	Sudbury				
Thornhill	Susan Kadis	incumbent MP						
Thunder Bay—Rainy River	Ken Boshcoff	incumbent MP						
Thunder Bay—Superior North	Don McArthur							
Timmins-James Bay	Paul Taillefer							
Toronto Centre	Bob Rae	incumbent MP & Former Premier of Ontario						
Toronto—Danforth	Andrew Lang							
Trinity—Spadina	Christine Innes							
Vaughan	Maurizio Bevilacqua	incumbent MP and Liberal leadership candidate						
Welland	John Maloney	incumbent MP						
Wellington—Halton Hills	Bruce Bowser							
Whitby—Oshawa	Brent Fullard							
Willowdale	Martha Hall Findlay	Incumbent MP and Liberal leadership candidate in 2006						
Windsor—Tecumseh	Steve Mastroianni							
Windsor West	Larry Horwitz							
York Centre	Ken Dryden	Incumbent MP, Liberal leadership candidate, former cabinet minister, and only sitting MP who is a member of the Hockey Hall of Fame						
York—Simcoe	Judith Moses							
York South—Weston	Alan Tonks	incumbent MP						
York West	Judy Sgro	incumbent MP						

== Manitoba - 14 Seats ==
Riding	Candidate's Name	Notes	Gender	Residence	Occupation	Votes	%	Rank
Brandon—Souris	Martha Jo Willard		F	Winnipeg	Physician	2,836	8.3%	4th
Charleswood—St. James—Assiniboia	Bob Friesen		M	Winnipeg	Agricultural Consultant	8,514	21.2%	2nd
Churchill	Tina Keeper	incumbent MP	F	Winnipeg	Parliamentarian	5,289	28.7%	2nd
Dauphin—Swan River—Marquette	Wendy Menzies		F	Neepawa	Teacher/Musician	4,128	14.0%	3rd
Elmwood—Transcona	Wes Penner		M	Winnipeg	Owner/Manager	2,079	6.63%	3rd
Kildonan—St. Paul	Lesley Hughes	Lost the party's endorsement on September 26 and ran as an independent, but was still listed on the ballot as the riding's Liberal candidate, as the withdrawal deadline had passed.	F	Winnipeg	Journalist	3,009	8.1%	3rd
Portage—Lisgar	Ted Klassen		M	Altona	Teacher (retired)	4,374	13.6%	2nd
Provencher	Shirley Hiebert		F	Steinbach	Health Care Consultant	4,531	12.6%	3rd
Saint Boniface	Raymond Simard	Incumbent MP	M	Winnipeg	Parliamentarian	14,728	35.1%	2nd
Selkirk—Interlake	Kevin Walsh		M	Winnipeg	Foster Parent/Support Worker	3,203	8.3%	3rd
Winnipeg Centre	Daniel Hurley		M	Winnipeg	University Administrator	3,922	15.6%	3rd
Winnipeg North	Marcelle Marion		F	Winnipeg	Lawyer	2,075	9.2%	3rd
Winnipeg South	John Loewen	Former MLA	M	Winnipeg	Businessman	14,221	34.8%	2nd
Winnipeg South Centre	Anita Neville	Incumbent MP	F	Winnipeg	Parliamentarian	16,438	42.3%	1st

== Saskatchewan - 14 seats ==
Riding	Candidate's Name	Notes	Gender	Residence	Occupation	Votes	%	Rank
Battlefords—Lloydminster	Greg Nyholt		M	North Battleford	Farmer	2,140	8.2%	3rd
Blackstrap	Deb Ehmann		F	Saskatoon	Human Resource Manager	5,509	14.3%	3rd
Cypress Hills—Grasslands	Duane Filson		M	Woodrow	Farmer	3,691	13.3%	3rd
Desnethé—Missinippi—Churchill River	David Orchard	Progressive Conservative candidate in 2000 in Prince Albert, Former PC leadership contender	M	Borden	Farmer	5,816	30.3%	2nd
Palliser	Calvin Johnston	Former Chief of Police for Regina	M	Regina	Former Police Chief	5,489	17.1%	3rd
Prince Albert	Lou Doderai		M	Prince Albert	Realtor	2,289	8.0%	3rd
Regina—Lumsden—Lake Centre	Monica Lysack		F	Regina	Early Childhood Educator	4,668	14.9%	3rd
Regina—Qu'Appelle	Rod Flaman		M	Edenwold	Farmer	2,809	10.4%	3rd
Saskatoon—Humboldt	Karen Parhar		F	Saskatoon	Sessional Lecturer	4,135	12.0%	3rd
Saskatoon—Rosetown—Biggar	Roy Bluehorn		M	Saskatoon	Case Review Officer	1,188	4.4%	4th
Saskatoon—Wanuskewin	Patricia Zipchen		F	Saskatoon	Nurse	4,020	12.4%	3rd
Souris—Moose Mountain	Marlin Belt	2000 Candidate in Cypress Hills—Grasslands	M	Regina	Project Manager	1,834	6.7%	3rd
Wascana	Ralph Goodale	incumbent MP	M	Regina	Business Person	17,028	46.1%	1st
Yorkton—Melville	Bryan Bell		M	Regina	Manager	1,578	5.4%	4th

== Alberta - 28 seats ==
Riding	Candidate's Name	Notes	Gender	Residence	Occupation	Votes	%	Rank
Calgary Centre	Heesung Kim	2006 Candidate in this riding	F	Calgary	Architect	8,402	17.9%	2nd
Calgary Centre-North	Doug James		M	Calgary	Engineer	5,699	11.8%	4th
Calgary East	Bernie Kennedy	2006 Candidate in Macleod	M	Granum	Businessman	3,255	10.2%	4th
Calgary Northeast	Sanam Kang		M	Calgary	Self-employed	7,433	20.2%	2nd
Calgary—Nose Hill	Anoush Newman		F	Calgary	Executive	6,657	13.2%	2nd
Calgary Southeast	Brad Carroll		M	Calgary	Education Analyst	4,878	8.7%	3rd
Calgary Southwest	Marlene LaMontagne	2000 Candidate in Macleod	F	Calgary	Retired Businesswoman	4,918	9.3%	2nd
Calgary West	Jennifer Pollock		F	Calgary				
Crowfoot	Sharon Howe		F					
Edmonton Centre	Jim Wachowich		M					
Edmonton East	Stephanie Laskoski		F					
Edmonton—Leduc	Donna Lynn Smith		F	Edmonton				
Edmonton—Mill Woods—Beaumont	Indira Saroya		F					
Edmonton—St. Albert	Samir Sleiman		M					
Edmonton—Sherwood Park	Rick Szostak		M	Edmonton	Professor			
Edmonton—Spruce Grove	Chris Austin		M	Edmonton				
Edmonton—Strathcona	Claudette Roy		F					
Fort McMurray—Athabasca	John Webb		M					
Lethbridge	Michael Cormican		M					
Macleod	Isabel Paynter		F					
Medicine Hat	Beverley Botter							
Peace River	Liliane Maisonneuve		F					
Red Deer	Garfield Marks		M					
Vegreville—Wainwright	Adam Campbell		M					
Westlock—St. Paul	Leila Houle		F					
Wetaskiwin	Rita Dillon		F					
Wild Rose	Jenn Turcott		F			2,890	5.7%	4th
Yellowhead	Mohamed El-Rafih		M					

== British Columbia - 36 seats ==
Riding	Candidate's Name	Notes	Gender	Residence	Occupation	Votes	%	Rank
Abbotsford	Lionel Traverse		M					
British Columbia Southern Interior	Brenda Jagpal		F					
Burnaby—Douglas	Bill Cunningham		M					
Burnaby—New Westminster	Gerry Lenoski		M					
Cariboo—Prince George	Drew Adamick		M	Prince George	University Student	4,309	10.5%	3rd
Chilliwack—Fraser Canyon	Myra Sweeney		F					
Delta—Richmond East	Dana Miller		F					
Esquimalt—Juan de Fuca	Keith Martin	incumbent MP	M					
Fleetwood—Port Kells	Brenda Locke	Former provincial MLA for Surrey-Green Timbers.	F					
Kamloops—Thompson—Cariboo	Ken Sommerfeld		M					
Kelowna—Lake Country	Diana Cabott		F					
Kootenay—Columbia	Betty Aitchison		F					
Langley	Jake Gray		M					
Nanaimo—Alberni	Richard Pesik		M					
Nanaimo—Cowichan	Brian Scott		M					
Newton—North Delta	Sukh Dhaliwal	Incumbent MP	M					
New Westminster—Coquitlam	Michelle Hassen		F					
North Vancouver	Don Bell	Incumbent MP	M					
Okanagan—Coquihalla	Valerie Hallford		F					
Okanagan—Shuswap	Janna Francis		F					
Pitt Meadows—Maple Ridge—Mission	Dan Olson		M					
Port Moody—Westwood—Port Coquitlam	Ron McKinnon		M					
Prince George—Peace River	Lindsay Gidney		M					
Richmond	Raymond Chan	Incumbent MP	M					
Saanich—Gulf Islands	Briony Penn		F					
Skeena—Bulkley Valley	Corinna Morhart		F					
South Surrey—White Rock—Cloverdale	Judy Higginbotham		F					
Surrey North	Marc Muhammad		M					
Vancouver Centre	Hedy Fry	Incumbent MP	F					
Vancouver East	Ken Low		M	Vancouver	Professional Engineer			
Vancouver Island North	Geoff Fleischer		M					
Vancouver Kingsway	Wendy Yuan		F	Vancouver	Businesswoman			
Vancouver Quadra	Joyce Murray	Former MLA and incumbent MP	F					
Vancouver South	Ujjal Dosanjh	Incumbent MP	M					
Victoria	Anne Park Shannon		F					
West Vancouver—Sunshine Coast—Sea to Sky Country	Ian Sutherland	Mayor of Squamish	M					

== Yukon - 1 seat ==
Riding	Candidate's Name	Notes	Gender	Residence	Occupation	Votes	%	Rank
Yukon	Larry Bagnell	Incumbent MP	M	Whitehorse	Parliamentarian	6,715	45.8%	1st

== Northwest Territories - 1 seat ==
Riding	Candidate's Name	Notes	Gender	Residence	Occupation	Votes	%	Rank
Western Arctic	Gabrielle Mackenzie-Scott		F	Yellowknife	Businessperson	1,858	13.6%	3rd

== Nunavut - 1 seat ==
Riding	Candidate's Name	Notes	Gender	Residence	Occupation	Votes	%	Rank
Nunavut	Kirt Ejesiak	Former city councillor and deputy mayor in Iqaluit and principal secretary to Nunavut Premier Paul Okalik. Ran as a candidate in the Iqaluit West by-election on September 12, 2011, losing to Monica Ell-Kanayuk.	M	Iqaluit	Businessman	2,349	29.1%	2nd

== See also ==
- Results of the Canadian federal election, 2008
- Results by riding for the Canadian federal election, 2008
