= Gander—Grand Falls =

Former federal electoral district in Newfoundland and Labrador, Canada

Newfoundland and Labrador electoral district

Defunct federal electoral district
- Legislature: House of Commons
- District created: 1987
- District abolished: 2003
- First contested: 1988
- Last contested: 2004

Gander—Grand Falls was a federal electoral district in Newfoundland and Labrador, Canada, that was represented in the House of Commons of Canada from 1988 to 2004. This riding was created in 1987 from parts of Gander—Twillingate and Grand Falls—White Bay—Labrador ridings. It was abolished in 2003 when it was redistributed into Bonavista—Exploits, Humber—St. Barbe—Baie Verte, and Random—Burin—St. George's ridings.

== Members of Parliament ==
This riding elected the following members of Parliament:

Parliament	Years	Member	Party
Gander—Grand Falls; Riding created from Gander—Twillingate and Grand Falls—White Bay—Labrador
34th	1988–1993	George Baker	Liberal
35th	1993–1997	George Baker	Liberal
36th	1997–2000	George Baker	Liberal
37th	2000–2002	George Baker	Liberal
37th	2002–2004	Rex Barnes	Progressive Conservative
Riding dissolved into Bonavista—Exploits, Humber—St. Barbe—Baie Verte and Random—Burin—St. George's

George Baker, a Liberal, represented the riding from the 1997 general election until he was appointed to the Senate of Canada in 2002. Rex Barnes, a Progressive Conservative, won the 2002 by-election held to replace Baker, and represented the riding for the remainder of that Parliament.

== Election results ==
1988 Canadian federal election
Party	Candidate	Votes
Liberal	George Baker	20,314
Progressive Conservative	Abe Schwartz	11,478
New Democratic	Bryan Blackmore	4,618

1993 Canadian federal election
Party	Candidate	Votes
Liberal	George Baker	24,202
Progressive Conservative	Tom Rideout	6,063
New Democratic	Dennis Whalen	530
Natural Law	Nolan White	200

1997 Canadian federal election
Party	Candidate	Votes
Liberal	George Baker	13,409
Progressive Conservative	Todd Barker	8,652
New Democratic	Mary Shortall	3,620

2000 Canadian federal election
Party	Candidate	Votes
Liberal	George Baker	15,874
Progressive Conservative	Roger K. Pike	8,191
New Democratic	Bill Broderick	2,876
Alliance	Orville Penney	1,912

Canadian federal by-election, May 13, 2002 Resignation of George Baker (March 26, 2002)
Party	Candidate	Votes
Progressive Conservative	Rex Barnes	9,273
Liberal	Beaton Tulk	8,552
New Democratic	John Lannon	873
Alliance	Garry Hartle	422

== See also ==
- List of Canadian electoral districts
- Historical federal electoral districts of Canada
