= Bonavista—Gander—Grand Falls—Windsor =

Former federal electoral district in Newfoundland and Labrador, Canada

Coordinates: 48.910°N 55.384°W

Newfoundland and Labrador electoral district
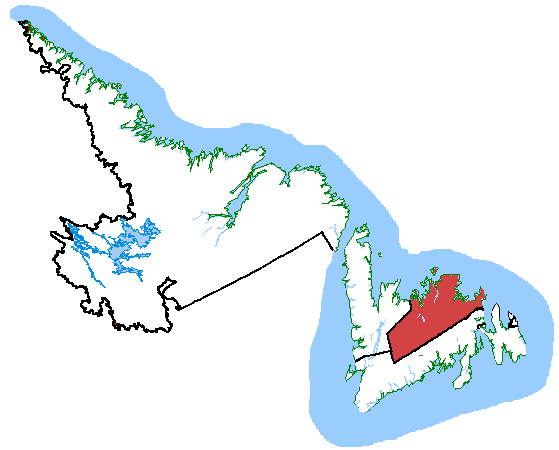
- Bonavista—Gander—Grand Falls—Windsor in relation to other Newfoundland and Labrador ridings

Defunct federal electoral district
- Legislature: House of Commons
- District created: 2003
- District abolished: 2013
- First contested: 2004
- Last contested: 2011
- District webpage: profile, map

Demographics
- Population (2011): 84,735
- Electors (2011): 69,828
- Area (km²): 27,140.84
- Census division(s): Division No. 3, Division No. 6, Division No. 7, Division No. 8
- Census subdivision(s): Grand Falls-Windsor, Gander, Bonavista, Bishop's Falls, Lewisporte, Botwood, New-Wes-Valley, Twillingate, Gambo, Glovertown

Bonavista—Gander—Grand Falls—Windsor (formerly Bonavista—Exploits) was a federal electoral district in Newfoundland and Labrador, Canada, that was represented in the House of Commons of Canada from 2004 until 2015. 81.0% of its population was Protestant, the highest proportion in Canada. In the 2011 federal election, this riding had the highest percentage of Liberal votes in the nation, with nearly 60% of voters backing Liberal candidate Scott Simms.

== Demographics ==
Ethnic groups:

98.4% White¹
1.6% First Peoples

Immigrant population: 0.92%

Languages:²

97.0% English
3.0% bilingual

Religions:

81.0% Protestant
16.4% Catholic
1.9% no affiliation
0.6% other Christian

The riding had the highest proportion of Protestants in Canada.

Post-secondary education: 31.3%
Average individual income: $19 829
Average household income: $40 677
Unemployment: 28.9%

¹ Statistics Canada's category of "Non-visible minority" includes First Peoples (First Nations, Métis and Inuit), and has been reduced accordingly.
² Based on ability to speak.

== Geography ==
The neighbouring ridings were Avalon, Random—Burin—St. George's, and Humber—St. Barbe—Baie Verte.

According to Elections Canada, the geographic definition of this riding was:

"All that area consisting of that part of the Island of Newfoundland lying generally easterly and northerly of a line described as follows: commencing at a point midway between the towns of Triton and Leading Tickles in Notre Dame Bay; thence southerly in said bay to Seal Bay; thence southerly in a straight line to Frozen Ocean Lake at approximate latitude 49°11'N and approximate longitude 55°41'W; thence westerly in a straight line to Hinds Lake; thence southerly in a straight line to the mouth of Lloyds River at the westernmost extremity of Red Indian Lake [now Beothuk Lake]; thence southerly in a straight line to a point in Victoria Lake at latitude 48°15'N and approximate longitude 57°21'W; thence easterly to the intersection of the Trans-Canada Highway (Route No. 1) with Route No. 230; thence easterly along Route No. 230 to Route No. 230A; thence easterly in a straight line to Ocean Pond; thence southeasterly in a straight line to British Harbour at the entrance of Smith Sound on the north shoreline of Trinity Bay; thence southeasterly to said bay. Including Exploits Islands, North and South Twillingate Islands, New World Island, Change Islands, Fogo Island, Funk Island, Cottel Island and all other islands adjacent to the shoreline of the above-described area."

== History ==
The electoral district was created in 2003: 68.6% from Gander—Grand Falls and 31.4% from Bonavista—Trinity—Conception. Following the 2012 electoral redistribution, this riding was dissolved and divided between Coast of Bays—Central—Notre Dame (67%) and Bonavista—Burin—Trinity (33%), with the new boundaries taking effect at the 2015 federal election.

=== Member of Parliament ===
This riding elected the following members of Parliament:

Parliament	Years	Member	Party
Bonavista—Exploits; Riding created from Gander—Grand Falls and Bonavista—Trinity—Conception
38th	2004–2006	Scott Simms	Liberal
Bonavista—Gander—Grand Falls—Windsor
39th	2006–2008	Scott Simms	Liberal
40th	2008–2011	Scott Simms	Liberal
41st	2011–2015	Scott Simms	Liberal
Riding dissolved into Coast of Bays—Central—Notre Dame and Bonavista—Burin—Trinity

== Election results ==
=== Bonavista—Gander—Grand Falls—Windsor, 2003 representation order ===
2011 Canadian federal election
Party	Candidate	Votes	%	±%	Expenditures
Liberal	Scott Simms	17,977	57.70	-12.57	$31,255.40
Conservative	Aaron Hynes	8,595	27.59	+12.36	$54,357.10
New Democratic	Clyde Bridger	4,306	13.82	+1.31	$9.50
Green	Robyn Kenny	279	0.90	-1.08	none listed
Total valid votes/expense limit		31,157	100.0	–	$95,488.47
Total rejected, declined and unmarked ballots		151	0.48	-0.02	
Turnout		31,308	36.24	-4.91	
Eligible voters		86,394			
Liberal hold		Swing		-12.46	

2008 Canadian federal election
Party	Candidate	Votes	%	±%	Expenditures
Liberal	Scott Simms	20,089	70.27	+18.23	$24,766.21
Conservative	Andrew House	4,354	15.23	-25.05	$31,582.25
New Democratic	Jason Holley	3,577	12.51	+5.52	none listed
Green	Robert O'Connor	568	1.98	+1.29	none listed
Total valid votes/expense limit		28,588	100.0	–	$92,537
Total rejected, declined and unmarked ballots		145	0.50	±0	
Turnout		28,733	41.15	-13.05	
Eligible voters		69,828			
Liberal hold		Swing		+21.64	

2006 Canadian federal election
Party	Candidate	Votes	%	±%	Expenditures
Liberal	Scott Simms	19,866	52.04	+3.84	$44,893.75
Conservative	Aaron Hynes	15,376	40.28	-1.33	$70,473.24
New Democratic	Sandra Cooze	2,668	6.99	-1.06	$960.36
Green	Judy Davis	265	0.69	-0.42	none listed
Total valid votes/expense limit		38,175	100.0	–	$86,380
Total rejected, declined and unmarked ballots		190	0.50	-0.03	
Turnout		38,365	54.20		
Eligible voters		70,782			
Liberal hold		Swing		+2.58	

=== Bonavista—Exploits, 2003 representation order ===
2004 Canadian federal election
Party	Candidate	Votes	%	±%	Expenditures
Liberal	Scott Simms	15,970	48.20	-7.12	$45,455.39
Conservative	Rex Barnes	13,786	41.61	+7.11	$78,934.75
New Democratic	Samuel Robert McLean	2,667	8.05	-2.14	$1,870.00
Green	Ed Sailor White	367	1.11	–	$275.00
Independent	John Lannon	344	1.04	–	none listed
Total valid votes/expense limit		33,134	100.0	–	$84,760
Total rejected, declined and unmarked ballots		178	0.53		
Turnout		33,312	46.30	-6.67	
Eligible voters		71,944			
Liberal notional hold		Swing		-7.12	
Changes from 2000 are based on redistributed results. Change for the Conservatives is based on the combined totals from the Progressive Conservatives and the Canadian Alliance.

2000 federal election redistributed results
Party	Vote	%
Liberal	21,079	55.32
Progressive Conservative	11,358	29.81
New Democratic Party	3,882	10.19
Alliance	1,788	4.69

== See also ==
- List of Canadian electoral districts
- Historical federal electoral districts of Canada
