= Gander—Twillingate =

Former federal electoral district in Newfoundland and Labrador, Canada

Newfoundland and Labrador electoral district

Defunct federal electoral district
- Legislature: House of Commons
- District created: 1966
- District abolished: 1987
- First contested: 1968
- Last contested: 1984

Gander—Twillingate was a federal electoral district in Newfoundland and Labrador, Canada, that was represented in the House of Commons of Canada from 1968 to 1988. This riding was created in 1966 from parts of Bonavista—Twillingate and Grand Falls—White Bay—Labrador ridings. It was abolished in 1987 when it was redistributed into Bonavista—Trinity—Conception and Gander—Grand Falls ridings.

The riding initially consisted of the provincial districts of Gander, Lewisporte, Twillingate, Fogo and Bonavista North, and the parts of the provincial districts of Green Bay, Bonavista South and Fortune Bay not included in the electoral districts of Grand Falls White Bay-Labrador, Bonavista-Trinity-Conception and Burin-Burgeo.

== Members of Parliament ==
This riding elected the following members of Parliament:

Parliament	Years	Member	Party
Gander—Twillingate; Riding created from Bonavista—Twillingate and Grand Falls—White Bay—Labrador
28th	1968–1972	John Lundrigan	Progressive Conservative
29th	1972–1974	John Lundrigan	Progressive Conservative
30th	1974–1979	George Baker	Liberal
31st	1979–1980	George Baker	Liberal
32nd	1980–1984	George Baker	Liberal
33rd	1984–1988	George Baker	Liberal
Riding dissolved into Bonavista—Trinity—Conception and Gander—Grand Falls

== Election results ==
1968 Canadian federal election
Party	Candidate	Votes
Progressive Conservative	John Lundrigan	10,601
Liberal	Charles R.M. Granger	9,016
New Democratic	Lowell Paulson	352

1972 Canadian federal election
Party	Candidate	Votes
Progressive Conservative	John Lundrigan	12,420
Liberal	George Baker	10,396
New Democratic	Walwin Blackmore	577

1974 Canadian federal election
Party	Candidate	Votes
Liberal	George Baker	12,722
Progressive Conservative	Rupert Short	8,021
New Democratic	Edgar A. Russell	2,143

1979 Canadian federal election
Party	Candidate	Votes
Liberal	George Baker	15,408
Progressive Conservative	Fred J. Dixon	4,727
New Democratic	Wallace Bown	4,460

1980 Canadian federal election
Party	Candidate	Votes
Liberal	George Baker	17,465
Progressive Conservative	Harold Collins	7,788
New Democratic	Clyde West	2,338

1984 Canadian federal election
Party	Candidate	Votes
Liberal	George Baker	16,100
Progressive Conservative	Eugene Burt	13,076
New Democratic	Gerry Panting	1,138

== See also ==
- List of Canadian electoral districts
- Historical federal electoral districts of Canada
