= Groais Island =

Coordinates: 50°56′N 55°36′W

Groais Island, Grey Islands.

Groais Island is one of the Grey Islands, Bell Island being the other. It has an area of 41 km^{2} and is located off Newfoundland's Great Northern Peninsula to the east in the Atlantic Ocean in Canada. The island is uninhabited, but was used earlier by fishermen.

Fishermen from Brittany named this island Groais in remembrance of the island of Groix. In Breton, Groix is written as Groe (pronounced [gʁwe]). The name might come from the Breton word groa, meaning "pebble ridge," which in turn is derived from the Celtic root graua, also the origin of the French word "gravier" (gravel).

The island is hilly, rising to over 100 metres. James Cook visited the island on 7 July 1754. The northern coastline of Groais Island has high cliffs rising over 100 metres from the ocean. Although the ocean is mostly ice-covered in the region from January to April, the prevailing westerly winds often create open leads of water around the island.

Groais Island is important for birds during both the breeding and wintering season.

== See also ==
- Humber—St. Barbe—Baie Verte
- List of islands of Newfoundland and Labrador

== Sources ==
- IBA, birds
- Cal Coish, The Hitch-Hiker, page 20
