= Dana Miller =

Dana Miller may refer to:

- Dana Miller, Liberal Party of Canada candidates, 2008 Canadian federal election#Delta—Richmond East
- Dana Miller, character on List of Person of Interest episodes
