= John Lundrigan =

Canadian politician

Member of Parliament for Gander—Twillingate
- In office September 9, 1968 – May 9, 1974
- Preceded by: first member
- Succeeded by: George Baker

MHA for Grand Falls-Buchans
- In office 1975–1979
- Preceded by: Aubrey Senior
- Succeeded by: Len Simms

Personal details
- Born: January 10, 1939 Upper Island Cove, Newfoundland
- Died: March 5, 2009 (aged 70)
- Party: Progressive Conservative
- Occupation: teacher, businessman

John Howard Lundrigan (January 10, 1939 – March 5, 2009) was a Canadian politician, who represented the electoral district of Gander—Twillingate in the House of Commons of Canada from 1968 to 1974. He was a member of the Progressive Conservative caucus.

In his parliamentary career, Lundrigan is best remembered for having been on the receiving end of Prime Minister Pierre Trudeau's famous "fuddle duddle" comment of 1971.

In the 1974 election, Lundrigan ran in the district of Bonavista—Trinity—Conception, but was defeated by that riding's incumbent MP, Dave Rooney.

He was later elected to the Newfoundland House of Assembly for the electoral district of Grand Falls-Buchans, serving as a cabinet minister in the government of Frank Moores. He was a pallbearer at Moores' funeral in 2005.

He is the father of novelist Nicole Lundrigan. Lundrigan died on March 5, 2009.
