= James Roy Tucker =

Canadian politician

- Official 1966 portrait

Member of Parliament for Trinity—Conception
- In office March 1958 – April 1968

Personal details
- Born: 25 December 1909 Burnt Point, Newfoundland
- Died: 22 September 1987 (aged 77) St. John's, Newfoundland, Canada
- Party: Liberal
- Profession: manager, merchant

James Roy Tucker (25 December 1909 – 22 September 1987) was a Liberal party member of the House of Commons of Canada. Born in Burnt Point, Newfoundland, he was a manager and merchant by career.

He was first elected at the Trinity—Conception riding in the 1958 general election then was re-elected there in 1962, 1963 and 1965. With riding boundary changes, Tucker was a candidate at the Bonavista—Trinity—Conception riding in the 1968 federal election but was defeated by Frank Moores of the Progressive Conservative party.
