= Random—Burin—St. George's =

Former federal electoral district in Newfoundland and Labrador, Canada

Coordinates: 47.7489°N 57.3944°W

Newfoundland and Labrador electoral district
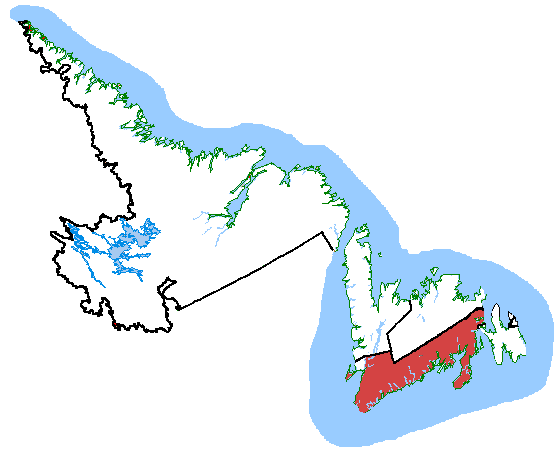
- Random—Burin—St. George's in relation to other Newfoundland and Labrador ridings

Defunct federal electoral district
- Legislature: House of Commons
- District created: 2003
- District abolished: 2013
- First contested: 2004
- Last contested: 2011
- District webpage: profile, map

Demographics
- Population (2011): 69,192
- Electors (2011): 57,209
- Area (km²): 34,095.30
- Census division(s): Division No. 2, Division No. 3, Division No. 4, Division No. 6
- Census subdivision(s): Stephenville, Marystown, Clarenville, Channel-Port aux Basques, Grand Bank, Burin

Random—Burin—St. George's was a federal electoral district in Newfoundland and Labrador, Canada, that was represented in the House of Commons of Canada from 2004 to 2015.

== Demographics ==
Ethnic groups: 94.7% White, 4.8% Native Canadian
Languages: 98.5% English
Religions: 54.6% Protestant, 43.8% Catholic, 1.3% no affiliation
Average income: $19 018

== Geography ==
The district included the south coast of the island of Newfoundland, the Stephenville area, the Burin Peninsula, and the west-central coast of Trinity Bay including Random Island, Brunette Island, Long Island, Merasheen Island, Red Island, and the Ramea Islands.

The neighbouring ridings were Avalon, Bonavista—Gander—Grand Falls—Windsor, and Humber—St. Barbe—Baie Verte.

According to Elections Canada, the boundaries of this riding for the 39th General Election were:

"All that area consisting of that part of the Island of Newfoundland lying southerly and westerly of a line described as follows: commencing at Bluff Head on the eastern shoreline of Port au Port Bay; thence easterly in a straight line to Georges Lake; thence easterly in a straight line to the mouth of Lloyds River at the westernmost extremity of Red Indian Lake [now known as Beothuk Lake]; thence southerly in a straight line to a point in Victoria Lake at latitude 48°15'N and approximate longitude 57°21'W; thence generally easterly to the intersection of the Trans-Canada Highway (Route No. 1) with Route No. 230; thence easterly along Route No. 230 to Route No. 230A; thence easterly in a straight line to Ocean Pond; thence southeasterly in a straight line to British Harbour at the entrance of Smith Sound on the north shoreline of Trinity Bay; thence southeasterly to said bay; thence southerly along Trinity Bay to the easterly production in Trinity Bay of the northerly limit of the Town of Sunnyside; thence westerly along said production and said northerly limit to the Trans-Canada Highway (Route No. 1); thence southerly along said highway to the northerly limit of the Town of Come By Chance; thence westerly and southerly along the northerly and westerly limits of said town to the shoreline of Placentia Bay; thence southerly along the Eastern Channel of Placentia Bay and Placentia Bay to a point approximately 20 km west of Cape St. Mary's. Including Random Island, Ireland's Eye, Merasheen Island, Red Island, Long Island, Green Island, Brunette Island, Penguin Islands, Ramea Islands and all other islands adjacent to the shoreline of the above-described area."

== History ==
The electoral district was created in 2003: 87.1% of the population of the riding came from Burin—St. George's, 12.9% from Bonavista—Trinity—Conception, and 0.1% from Humber—St. Barbe—Baie Verte. The incumbent for Burin—St. George's riding was Bill Matthews of the Liberal Party of Canada. Following the 2012 federal electoral redistribution, this riding was dissolved and divided between Bonavista—Burin—Trinity (45%), Long Range Mountains (44%) and Coast of Bays—Central—Notre Dame (11%), with the new boundaries taking effect at the 2015 federal election.

This riding elected the following members of Parliament:

Parliament	Years	Member	Party
Random—Burin—St. George's; Riding created from Burin—St. George's, Bonavista—Trinity—Conception and Humber—St. Barbe—Baie Verte
38th	2004–2006	Bill Matthews	Liberal
39th	2006–2008	Bill Matthews	Liberal
40th	2008–2011	Judy Foote	Liberal
41st	2011–2015	Judy Foote	Liberal
Riding dissolved into Bonavista—Burin—Trinity, Long Range Mountains and Coast of Bays—Central—Notre Dame

== Election results ==
=== Random—Burin—St. George's, 2003 representation order ===
2011 Canadian federal election
Party	Candidate	Votes	%	±%	Expenditures
Liberal	Judy Foote	12,914	49.65	-4.10	$31,470.79
Conservative	John Ottenheimer	8,322	32.00	+11.49	$58,392.45
New Democratic	Stella Magalios	4,465	17.17	-6.60	$9.13
Green	Tanya Gutmanis	307	1.18	-0.80	none listed
Total valid votes/expense limit		26,008	100.0	–	$94,623.02
Total rejected, unmarked and declined ballots		120	0.46	+0.06	
Turnout		26,128	45.80	+4.73	
Eligible voters		57,047			
Liberal hold		Swing		-7.80	

2008 Canadian federal election
Party	Candidate	Votes	%	±%	Expenditures
Liberal	Judy Foote	12,557	53.75	+8.26	$27,863.09
New Democratic	Terry White	5,553	23.77	+11.43	$5,574.70
Conservative	Herb Davis	4,791	20.51	-20.25	$86,684.21
Green	Kaitlin Wainwright	462	1.98	+0.56	none listed
Total valid votes/expense limit		23,363	100.0	–	$91,604
Total rejected, unmarked and declined ballots		122	0.52	+0.09	
Turnout		23,495	41.07	-11.4	
Eligible voters		57,209			
Liberal hold		Swing		-3.17	

2006 Canadian federal election
Party	Candidate	Votes	%	±%	Expenditures
Liberal	Bill Matthews	13,652	45.49	-1.28	$24,312.48
Conservative	Cynthia Downey	12,232	40.76	+22.55	$27,919.55
New Democratic	Amanda Will	3,702	12.34	-20.95	$842.43
Green	Mark A. Brennan	426	1.42	-0.37	none listed
Total valid votes/expense limit		30,012	100.0	–	$85,393
Total rejected ballots		131	0.43	-0.09	
Turnout		30,143	52.09	+7.18	
Eligible voters		57,869			
Liberal hold		Swing		-11.92	

2004 Canadian federal election
Party	Candidate	Votes	%	±%	Expenditures
Liberal	Bill Matthews	12,383	46.77	-1.03	$32,788.03
New Democratic	Desmond McGrath	8,797	33.29	+28.76	$29,123.91
Conservative	Larry Peckford	4,820	18.21	-7.18	$35,579.47
Green	Justin Dollimont	474	1.79	–	$468.70
Total valid votes/expense limit		26,474	100.0	–	$83,804
Total rejected, unmarked and declined ballots		139	0.52		
Turnout		26,613	44.91	-12.34	
Eligible voters		59,256			
Liberal notional hold		Swing		-14.90	
Changes from 2000 are based on redistributed results. Change for the Conservatives is based on the combined totals of the Progressive Conservatives and the Canadian Alliance.

2000 federal election redistributed results
Party	Vote	%
Liberal	16,523	47.80
Independent	7,702	22.28
Progressive Conservative	7,211	20.86
Alliance	1,567	4.53
New Democratic	1,565	4.53

== See also ==
- List of Canadian electoral districts
- Historical federal electoral districts of Canada
