= Leonard Stick =

Canadian politician

The Honourable Second Lieutenant Leonard Stick MP
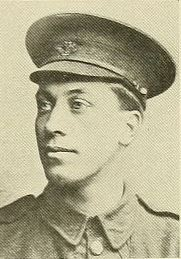
- Leonard Tretheway Stick, ca. 1914

Member of Parliament for Trinity—Conception
- In office June 1949 – February 1958

Personal details
- Born: Leonard Tretheway Stick; 7 February 1892 St. John's, Newfoundland
- Died: 7 December 1979 (aged 87)
- Party: Liberal
- Profession: accountant, businessman, clerk, manager, policeman, soldier

Military service
- Allegiance: (Dominion of Newfoundland) Newfoundland 1914–1917 (British Raj) India 1917–1919
- Years of service: 1914–1919
- Rank: Second Lieutenant
- Unit: Royal Newfoundland Regiment; British Indian Army
- Battles/wars: World War I, Third Anglo-Afghan War

Leonard Tretheway Stick (7 February 1892 – 7 December 1979) was a Liberal party member of the House of Commons of Canada. He was born in St. John's, Newfoundland and became an accountant, businessman, clerk and manager by career. Leonard Stick was the first Newfoundlander to enlist during World War I, following the creation of the Newfoundland Regiment in September 1914.

== Life ==
=== Family ===
Leonard Stick was born 7 February 1892 in St. John's, Newfoundland. His parents were James Robbins Stick (1856-1921) and Emma Colton Knight Stick (d.1916). Leonard was the fifth of eight children; he had three sisters: Matilda (May) Knight (born 1881), Emma (born 1884) and Beatrice Robbins (born 1894); and four brothers: Joseph Paul (born 1879), James Robbins (Rob) (born 1888), Edward Moyle Tregaskus (born 1895) and Ralph Tynes (born 1899).

=== Military and police career ===
On 5 September 1914, a day after the 23rd General Assembly of Newfoundland passed an Act authorizing the formation of the Royal Newfoundland Regiment, Leonard Stick was given Regimental No. 1 as the first person to enlist. He was made Sergeant on 21 September 1914 and was part of the British Mediterranean Force in 1915. With the Regiment at Beaumont Hamel, he was wounded and commissioned as a Second Lieutenant on the same fateful day of 1 July 1916. On 1 October 1917, he was transferred to the Indian Army and served in the Third Afghan War. He later served as the first Chief Ranger of the Newfoundland Ranger Force, serving with them from 1935 to 1936.

=== Political career ===
He was first elected at the Trinity—Conception riding in the 1949 general election then re-elected in 1953 and 1957 election. After completing his final federal term, the 23rd Canadian Parliament, Stick left the House of Commons and did not seek further re-election.

== Legacy ==
On 22 June 2012 the access road into Bay Roberts from Veterans Memorial Highway (Route 75) was named L.T. Stick Drive.
