= Rex Barnes =

Canadian politician

Member of the Canadian Parliament for Gander—Grand Falls
- In office 2002–2004
- Preceded by: George Baker
- Succeeded by: District abolished, became Bonavista—Exploits

Personal details
- Born: June 4, 1959 (age 66) Grand Falls-Windsor, Newfoundland and Labrador, Canada
- Party: Conservative
- Other political affiliations: Progressive Conservative

Rex Barnes (born June 4, 1959) is a Canadian politician.

Born in Grand Falls-Windsor, Newfoundland and Labrador, Barnes was a member of the Progressive Conservative caucus in the House of Commons of Canada, representing the riding of Gander—Grand Falls. Elected in a by-election in 2002, he lost his seat in the 2004 election to Liberal candidate Scott Simms, running as the member for Bonavista—Exploits.

Barnes has been a paramedic, and a volunteer worker. Barnes was the Progressive Conservative critic for Public Works and Government Services, and Transport. He served as a city councillor in Grand Falls-Windsor for 9 years.

Barnes served as mayor of Grand Falls-Windsor from September 2005 to September 2009.

In February 2011, he announced plans to challenge incumbent MHA Ray Hunter for the Progressive Conservative party nomination in Grand Falls-Windsor-Green Bay South for the 2011 provincial election. Barnes lost the nomination receiving 327 votes to Hunter's 533.

Barnes ran as an independent candidate in Grand Falls-Windsor-Buchans in the 2015 provincial election. He finished in third place with 19.6% of the vote.
