= Morrissey Johnson =

Canadian politician

Frederick Morrissey Johnson

Member of the Canadian Parliament for Bonavista—Trinity—Conception
- In office 4 September 1984 – 21 November 1988
- Preceded by: Dave Rooney
- Succeeded by: Fred Mifflin

Personal details
- Born: 21 October 1932 Little Catalina, Dominion of Newfoundland
- Died: 14 July 2003 (aged 70) Lewisporte Junction, Newfoundland and Labrador, Canada
- Party: Progressive Conservative

Frederick Morrissey Johnson (21 October 1932 – 14 July 2003) was a Progressive Conservative party member of the House of Commons of Canada. He was born in Little Catalina, Newfoundland and became a business manager, businessman and master mariner by career.

Johnson studied at the Newfoundland College of Marine Navigation and the Newfoundland College of Fisheries. He served as president of Claymorr Shipping Ltd. and Johnson Combined Enterprises Ltd. and became a director of the Newfoundland Shipowner's Association. He was a maritime captain particularly in the seal hunting industry. Since protests and restrictions towards the seal hunt escalated, Johnson conducted his last sealing voyage in April 1983.

Johnson was first elected at the Bonavista—Trinity—Conception electoral district in the 1984 federal election, thus he served in the 33rd Canadian Parliament. He lost the riding in the 1988 federal election to Fred Mifflin of the Liberal party.

Since his departure from national politics, Johnson served as chair of the Atlantic Salmon Advisory Board. He was killed at age 70 in a motor vehicle collision with a moose near Lewisporte Junction. He had twelve children, two of whom with his second wife, Betty-Ann Johnson.
