= Clifford Small =

Canadian politician (born 1970)

Clifford Small MP
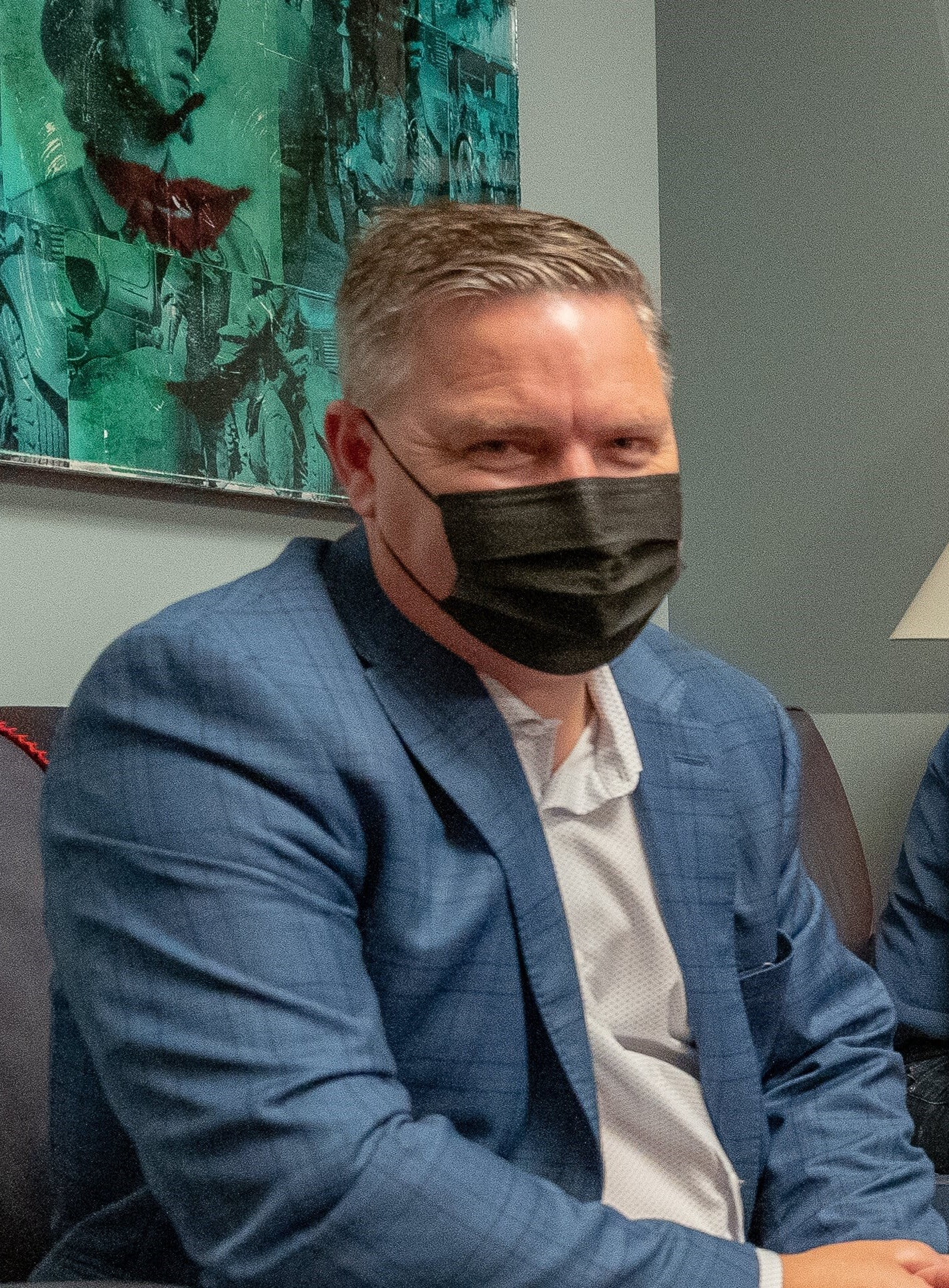
- Small in 2021

Member of Parliament for Coast of Bays—Central—Notre Dame Central Newfoundland (2025–2026)
- Incumbent
- Assumed office September 20, 2021
- Preceded by: Scott Simms

Personal details
- Born: August 29, 1970 (age 56) Wild Cove, Newfoundland, Canada
- Party: Conservative
- Education: College of the North Atlantic
- Profession: Businessman

Clifford Small MP (born August 29, 1970) is a Canadian politician who is the Member of Parliament for Central Newfoundland, having defeated Liberal incumbent Scott Simms by a close margin of 264 votes in the 2021 general election. He is a member of the Conservative Party of Canada. He is the first Conservative MP from Newfoundland and Labrador since Peter Penashue resigned in 2013. In Newfoundland alone, he is the first Conservative MP elected since Fabian Manning in 2006. He was appointed Shadow Minister for the Atlantic Canada Opportunities Agency by Erin O'Toole on November 9, 2021. He endorsed Pierre Poilievre in the 2022 Conservative Party of Canada leadership election. In October 2022, Poilievre appointed him as Fisheries, Oceans and the Canadian Coast Guard Shadow Minister and he remains shadow minister in 2025. He was re-elected in 2025.

== Biography ==
Small grew up in Wild Cove, White Bay. He was educated at the College of the North Atlantic and graduated in electrical engineering technology. He worked in engineering design until 1994 when he started a fishing business.

He subsequently opened three restaurants, including two Smitty's franchise locations. In May 2026, Small became the subject of two lawsuits totalling over $353,000 in connection with his Smitty's franchise in Mount Pearl, which he had operated since 2004. A property owner sued for unpaid restaurant rent, while the City of Mount Pearl separately sued his company for failing to pay utility taxes from 2019 to 2025 and business taxes from 2021 to 2025, seeking a combined $120,696 in unpaid taxes, interest, and costs. Both of Small's Smitty's franchises were closed without warning in June 2026.

At the time of the 2025 Canadian federal election, he lived in St. John's, Newfoundland and Labrador.

== Electoral record ==
2025 Canadian federal election: Central Newfoundland
Party	Candidate	Votes	%	±%	Expenditures
Conservative	Clifford Small	21,975	54.08	+7.19	$81,223.89
Liberal	Lynette Powell	17,696	43.55	−2.46	$94,503.27
New Democratic	Darian Vincent	965	2.37	−4.73	$0.00
Total valid votes/expense limit		40,636	98.80	+0.94	$145,078.76
Total rejected ballots		492	1.20	-0.94	
Turnout		41,128	64.17	+13.05	
Eligible voters		64,095			
Conservative notional hold		Swing		+4.83	
Source: Elections Canada

2021 Canadian federal election: Coast of Bays—Central—Notre Dame
Party	Candidate	Votes	%	±%	Expenditures
Conservative	Clifford Small	14,927	46.89	+11.55	$59,241.94
Liberal	Scott Simms	14,646	46.01	−2.30	$41,577.53
New Democratic	Jamie Ruby	2,261	7.10	−5.25	$0.00
Total valid votes/expense limit		31,834	97.86		$124,135.56
Total rejected ballots		695	2.14	-0.07	
Turnout		32,529	51.12	-3.80	
Registered voters		63,631			
Conservative gain from Liberal		Swing		+6.93	
Source: Elections Canada
