= George Baker (Canadian politician) =

Canadian politician (born 1942)

The Honourable George Baker PC

Minister of Veterans Affairs
- In office August 3, 1999 – October 17, 2000
- Prime Minister: Jean Chrétien
- Preceded by: Fred Mifflin
- Succeeded by: Ron Duhamel

Secretary of State (Atlantic Canada Opportunities Agency)
- In office August 3, 1999 – October 15, 2000
- Prime Minister: Jean Chrétien
- Minister: John Manley
- Preceded by: Fred Mifflin
- Succeeded by: Position abolished
Parliamentary constituencies
Canadian Senator from Newfoundland and Labrador
In office March 26, 2002 – September 4, 2017
Nominated by	Jean Chrétien
Appointed by	Adrienne Clarkson
Preceded by	Raymond Squires (2001)
Succeeded by	Mohamed-Iqbal Ravalia (2018)
Member of Parliament for Gander—Grand Falls (Gander—Twillingate; 1974–1988)
In office July 8, 1974 – March 25, 2002
Preceded by	John Lundrigan
Succeeded by	Rex Barnes

Personal details
- Born: September 4, 1942 (age 84) Dominion of Newfoundland
- Party: Independent (since 2014); Senate Liberal Caucus (2014–2019)
- Other political affiliations: Liberal (until 2014)
- Children: Annelle Baker, Averill Baker, Eli Baker, Joscelyn Baker, and granddaughter Annelle.
- Occupation: Canadian Senator

George S. Baker PC (born September 4, 1942) is a Canadian politician and former member of the Senate of Canada.

Baker was first elected to the House of Commons in the 1974 election as the Liberal Member of Parliament (MP) for Gander—Twillingate, in Newfoundland and Labrador. He was re-elected in every subsequent election (representing Gander—Grand Falls after 1988) until his appointment to the Senate by Governor General Adrienne Clarkson, on the recommendation of Prime Minister Jean Chrétien, in 2002.

Although a popular and articulate MP, he was hurt by the tradition of appointing no more than one Canadian Cabinet minister from Newfoundland at a time, and by his reputation as a maverick who said what he thought rather than what the party leadership would like him to say. Fred Mifflin's and Brian Tobin's appointments to cabinet following the 1993 election meant Baker had to remain on the backbench. Tobin's resignation from the cabinet to become Premier of Newfoundland and Labrador opened the way for Baker to be appointed as Minister of Veterans Affairs. But when Prime Minister Chrétien lured Tobin back to Ottawa for the 2000 election, Baker was removed from Cabinet. He was appointed to the Senate in 2002.

On January 29, 2014, Liberal Party leader Justin Trudeau announced all Liberal Senators, including Baker, were removed from the Liberal caucus, and would continue sitting as Independents. According to Senate Opposition leader James Cowan, the Senators refer to themselves as the Senate Liberal Caucus even though they are no longer members of the parliamentary Liberal caucus.

Baker retired from the Senate upon reaching the mandatory retirement age of 75 on September 4, 2017.

== Bloc Newfoundland controversy ==
In March 2009, as a Liberal Senator for Newfoundland and Labrador, he was the first among Newfoundland's federal parliamentarians to overtly call for the foundation of a new sovereigntist party, based on the Bloc Québécois, largely in response to the $1.7 billion cuts in equalization payments that represented no less than 20% of the province's budget, due to a change of how natural resources are factored in the calculation of equalization transfers.

This prompted a rebuke from the Prime Minister's office and political commentators in Toronto and Ottawa. Some Conservative MPs demanded that Michael Ignatieff kick him out of the Liberal caucus, that he refused to do. However, this action caused little outcry in his home province.
