= Trinity—Conception =

Former federal electoral district in Newfoundland and Labrador, Canada

Newfoundland and Labrador electoral district

Defunct federal electoral district
- Legislature: House of Commons
- District created: 1949
- District abolished: 1966
- First contested: 1949
- Last contested: 1965

Trinity—Conception was a federal electoral district in Newfoundland and Labrador, Canada, that was represented in the House of Commons of Canada from 1949 to 1968. This riding was created in 1949 when Newfoundland joined the Canadian Confederation. It was abolished in 1966 when it was merged into Bonavista—Trinity—Conception riding.

It consisted of the Districts of Trinity North, Trinity South, Carbonear-Bay de Verde, Harbour Grace, and Port de Grave.

== Members of Parliament ==
This riding elected the following members of Parliament:

Parliament	Years	Member	Party
Trinity—Conception
21st	1949–1953	Leonard Stick	Liberal
22nd	1953–1957	Leonard Stick	Liberal
23rd	1957–1958	Leonard Stick	Liberal
24th	1958–1962	James Roy Tucker	Liberal
25th	1962–1963	James Roy Tucker	Liberal
26th	1963–1965	James Roy Tucker	Liberal
27th	1965–1968	James Roy Tucker	Liberal
Riding dissolved into Bonavista—Trinity—Conception

== Election results ==
1949 Canadian federal election
Party	Candidate	Votes
Liberal	Leonard Stick	10,929
Progressive Conservative	Richard Cramm	3,149

1953 Canadian federal election
Party	Candidate	Votes
Liberal	Leonard Stick	8,814
Progressive Conservative	Alfred Ernest Simmons	2,704
Co-operative Commonwealth	Edgar Alexander Russell	707

1957 Canadian federal election
Party	Candidate	Votes
Liberal	Leonard Stick	8,360
Progressive Conservative	Arthur E. Harnett	3,707

1958 Canadian federal election
Party	Candidate	Votes
Liberal	James Roy Tucker	12,599
Progressive Conservative	Arthur E. Harnett	8,897

1962 Canadian federal election
Party	Candidate	Votes
Liberal	James Roy Tucker	12,104
Progressive Conservative	Albert B. Butt	6,996

1963 Canadian federal election
Party	Candidate	Votes
Liberal	James Roy Tucker	12,331
Progressive Conservative	Albert B. Butt	4,856

1965 Canadian federal election
Party	Candidate	Votes
Liberal	James Roy Tucker	10,377
Progressive Conservative	Joseph G. Noel	4,656
Independent Liberal	Samuel Drover	1,022
New Democratic	Harold Horwood	560

== See also ==
- List of Canadian electoral districts
- Historical federal electoral districts of Canada
