= Coast of Bays—Central—Notre Dame =

Federal electoral district in Newfoundland and Labrador, Canada

Newfoundland and Labrador electoral district
- Interactive map of riding boundaries from the 2025 federal election

Federal electoral district
- Legislature: House of Commons
MP
Clifford Small
Conservative
- District created: 2013
- First contested: 2015
- Last contested: 2025
- District webpage: profile, map

Demographics
- Population (2021): 74,201
- Electors (2025): 63,112
- Area (km²): 38,674.01
- Pop. density (per km²): 1.9
- Census subdivision(s): Grand Falls-Windsor, Gander, Lewisporte, Bishop's Falls, Springdale, Botwood, Twillingate, Fogo Island, Harbour Breton, Baie Verte

Coast of Bays—Central—Notre Dame (previously Central Newfoundland) is a federal electoral district in Newfoundland and Labrador, Canada.

== Demographics ==
According to the 2021 Canadian census

Ethnic groups: 91.8% White, 7% Indigenous
Languages: 98.9% English
Religions: 86.3% Christian (19% Catholic, 17.5% Pentecostal and other Charismatic, 17% Anglican, 14.6% Methodist and Wesleyan, 12.6% United Church), 13.2% No religion
Median income: $32,400 (2020)
Average income: $41,520 (2020)

== History ==
Coast of Bays—Central—Notre Dame was created by the 2012 federal electoral boundaries redistribution and was legally defined in the 2013 representation order. It came into effect upon the call of the 2015 Canadian federal election, held October 19, 2015. It was created from the portions of the island of Newfoundland previously included in the electoral districts of Bonavista—Gander—Grand Falls—Windsor (72%), Humber—St. Barbe—Baie Verte (18%) and Random—Burin—St. George's (10%). It was the first election result called for in the 2015 and 2019 Canadian federal election.

Following the 2022 Canadian federal electoral redistribution, this riding was renamed Central Newfoundland.

The riding's name was reverted to Coast of Bays—Central—Notre Dame in 2026 as part of Bill C-25 of the 45th Canadian Parliament.

=== Members of Parliament ===
Parliament	Years	Member	Party
Coast of Bays—Central—Notre Dame; Riding created from Random—Burin—St. George's, Humber—St. Barbe—Baie Verte and Bonavista—Gander—Grand Falls—Windsor
42nd	2015–2019	Scott Simms	Liberal
43rd	2019–2021	Scott Simms	Liberal
44th	2021–2025	Clifford Small	Conservative
Central Newfoundland
45th	2025–2026	Clifford Small	Conservative
Coast of Bays—Central—Notre Dame
45th	2026–present	Clifford Small	Conservative

== Election results ==
View source data.
Graph of election results in Coast of Bays—Central—Notre Dame (minor parties that never got 2% of the vote or didn't run consistently are omitted)

2021 Election by Polling Area

=== 2025 ===
2025 Canadian federal election: Central Newfoundland
Party	Candidate	Votes	%	±%	Expenditures
Conservative	Clifford Small	21,975	54.08	+7.19	$81,223.89
Liberal	Lynette Powell	17,696	43.55	−2.46	$94,503.27
New Democratic	Darian Vincent	965	2.37	−4.73	$0.00
Total valid votes/expense limit		40,636	98.80	+0.94	$145,078.76
Total rejected ballots		492	1.20	-0.94	
Turnout		41,128	64.17	+13.05	
Eligible voters		64,095			
Conservative notional hold		Swing		+4.83	
Source: Elections Canada

=== 2021 ===
2021 Canadian federal election
Party	Candidate	Votes	%	±%	Expenditures
Conservative	Clifford Small	14,927	46.89	+11.55	$59,241.94
Liberal	Scott Simms	14,646	46.01	−2.30	$41,577.53
New Democratic	Jamie Ruby	2,261	7.10	−5.25	$0.00
Total valid votes/expense limit		31,834	97.86		$124,135.56
Total rejected ballots		695	2.14	-0.07	
Turnout		32,529	51.12	-3.80	
Registered voters		63,631			
Conservative gain from Liberal		Swing		+6.93	
Source: Elections Canada

=== 2019 ===
2019 Canadian federal election
Party	Candidate	Votes	%	±%	Expenditures
Liberal	Scott Simms	16,514	48.31	-26.52	$48,943.91
Conservative	Alex Bracci	12,081	35.34	+17.02	none listed
New Democratic	Noel Joe	4,224	12.36	+6.26	$6,009.07
Green	Byron White	1,363	3.99	+3.24	$5,899.33
Total valid votes/expense limit		34,182	97.80	-1.79	120,385.86
Total rejected ballots		770	2.20	+1.79	
Turnout		34,952	55.59	-0.12	
Eligible voters		62,880			
Liberal hold		Swing		-26.51	
Source: Elections Canada

=== 2015 ===
2015 Canadian federal election
Party	Candidate	Votes	%	±%	Expenditures
Liberal	Scott Simms	26,523	74.82	+19.90	$53,460.35
Conservative	Kevin O'Brien	6,479	18.28	–12.04	$151,187.70
New Democratic	Claudette Menchenton	2,175	6.14	–7.49	$3,416.01
Green	Elizabeth Perry	271	0.76	–0.12	–
Total valid votes/expense limit		35,448	99.59		$238,355.39
Total rejected ballots		145	0.41	–	
Turnout		35,593	55.71	–	
Eligible voters		63,891			
Liberal notional hold		Swing		+15.97	
Source: Elections Canada

2011 federal election redistributed results
Party	Vote	%
Liberal	15,805	54.92
Conservative	8,724	30.31
New Democratic	3,920	13.62
Green	254	0.88
Independent	74	0.26

== Student vote results ==
=== 2025 ===
2025 Canadian federal election
Party	Candidate	Votes	%
Conservative	Clifford Small	1,591	57.05
Liberal	Lynette Powell	966	34.64
New Democratic	Darian Vincent	232	8.32
Total votes		2,789	100.1
Source: Student Vote Canada

=== 2021 ===
2021 Canadian federal election
Party	Candidate	Votes	%
Liberal	Scott Simms	550	43.48
Conservative	Clifford Small	404	31.94
New Democratic	Jamie Ruby	311	24.58
Total votes		1,265	100
Source: Student Vote Canada

=== 2019 ===
2019 Canadian federal election
Party	Candidate	Votes	%	±%
Liberal	Scott Simms	887	41.76	-25.02
New Democratic	Noel Joe	518	24.39	+10.72
Conservative	Alex Bracci	418	19.68	+4.41
Green	Byron White	301	14.17	+9.89
Total votes		2,124	100.0	
Source: Student Vote Canada

=== 2015 ===
2015 Canadian federal election
Party	Candidate	Votes	%
Liberal	Scott Simms	796	66.78
Conservative	Kevin George O'Brien	182	15.27
New Democratic	Claudette Menchenton	163	13.67
Green	Elizabeth Perry	51	4.28
Total votes		1,165	100.0
Source: Student Vote Canada

== See also ==
- List of Canadian electoral districts
- Historical federal electoral districts of Canada
