= Newfoundland Ranger Force =

Newfoundland based police force from 1935–1950

- Motto: Ubique (Latin for 'Everywhere')

Agency overview
- Formed: 1935
- Dissolved: July 31, 1950

Jurisdictional structure
- Operations jurisdiction: Newfoundland
- Map of Newfoundland Ranger Force's jurisdiction
- Population: 526,702
- Legal jurisdiction: Dominion of Newfoundland
- Governing body: Newfoundland Commission of Government
- General nature: Civilian police

Operational structure
- Headquarters: Colonial Building, St. John's 1935-1942; Kilbride Depot 1942-1949
- officers: 420
- civilians: 125
- Parent agency: Department of Natural Resources

The Newfoundland Ranger Force was the police force of the Dominion of Newfoundland. It provided law enforcement and other government services to outports for 15 years. It existed from 1935 to 1950, at which point it was merged into the Royal Canadian Mounted Police (RCMP). 204 men served as Rangers during its existence, though at any given time the force did not exceed 72 members.

The Commission of Government decided to model the Newfoundland Ranger force on the RCMP and not the Royal Newfoundland Constabulary, which at the time were in operation at St. John's.

== Operations ==
Recruits had to be male, single, between the age of 19 (though men as young as 17 managed to join) to 28, have attained high school grade 11, stand at least 5 feet 9 inches (175 cm) tall and weigh not more than 185 pounds (84 kg).

Training, which included paramilitary marching, battle drill and small arms practice, was administered by a sergeant major of the Newfoundland Militia.

The uniform, similar to that of the RCMP, consisted of a khaki tunic and breeches with a brown stripe, fur caps as winter attire. The dress uniform was of blue serge and accompanied by swords and sometimes hickory batons for riot control.

The badge was of a caribou head inscribed with the motto ubique, meaning everywhere.

Headquarters were located in the basement of the Colonial Building in St. John's and the forces men were housed in temporary barracks in a tent in Whitbourne, which later became permanent HQ from 1936 to 1942 In 1942 HQ moved to Kilbride and remained until the force was disbanded in 1950.

== Duties ==
They were responsible for carrying out policies of six government departments;

- Department of Finance, collection of customs duties and other fees and act as wreck commissioners.
- Department of Natural Resources, inspection of logging camps, enforcement of game laws, issuing game licences and directing the fighting of forest fires.
- Department of Public Health and Welfare, issuing relief payments, arranging medical treatment and hospitalization and escorting mental patients to hospital in St. John's.
- Department of Justice, enforcement of criminal law, investigation of suspicious deaths and in some areas acted as deputy sheriffs.
- Department of Home Affairs and Education, acted as truant officers and organized adult education programs.
- Department of Public Utilities, supervising the maintenance and construction of public roads, wharves and breakwaters.

== History ==
The force was recommended by Deputy Minister of Justice Brian Dunfield in 1932 to the Amulree Commission. The Newfoundland Constabulary was to remain as the police force for the major centres on the Avalon and Bonavista peninsulas while the Rangers would service remote areas of the island and Labrador.

The force was placed under the Department of Natural Resources, though served all six of the Commission's departments, under the control of Major Leonard T. Stick, an officer of the Royal Newfoundland Regiment.

The former estate of Sir Robert Bond, the Grange, located at Whitbourne was used as training facilities. Amongst the training in law enforcement they were also trained in how to record vital statistics and submit monthly reports.

When World War II began in 1939, the Dominions Office was forced to declare the Rangers an essential service, thus disallowing members to enlist in other armed services, after thirty-four Rangers had left the service. Those members who had departed joined a variety of military forces, including the Newfoundland Heavy Artillery, the Royal Air Force, the Royal Canadian Air Force, the Royal Canadian Navy and the Royal Navy.

The force was called upon to attend political meetings and also act as observers and during the 1948 referendum they operated the polling stations.

The Newfoundland Ranger Force was organizationally integrated into the RCMP on April 1, 1949, following Newfoundland's accession to Canada as Province on March 31, 1949. The Newfoundland Ranger Force was disbanded and amalgamated into RCMP B Division on July 31, 1950. Today, RCMP B Division serves rural Newfoundland and Labrador, while the Royal Newfoundland Constabulary serves urban municipalities.

The last living member of the Newfoundland Ranger Force Ranger 1st Class Cyril James Goodyear died on September 20, 2025 at age of 99.

== Chief Rangers ==
Chief Rangers who had served with the force;

- Leonard Stick (1892-1979) 1935-1936: Major Leonard Stick was the first person to join the Newfoundland Regiment in World War I.
- Frederick A. Anderton 1936 - 1939: English-born police officer came to Canada to join the then RNWMP, served with the Canadian Expeditionary Force and retired as RCMP Sergeant-Major; most of his career was served in Alberta, Northwest Territories and Yukon. Anderton headed training for the NRF beginning in 1935 before heading the force.
- E.W. Greenley 1939: RCMP Sergeant Major was temporary replacement for a few months and later retired with the RCMP.
- Raymond Danson Fraser (1898-1961) 1939 - 1944: retired Lieutenant with the Royal Newfoundland Regiment and joined NRF as Inspector and later worked overseas for the Government of Canada.
- Edward LeDrew Martin (1910-2006) 1944 - 1950: Career NRF member and later joined the RCMP as Assistant Commissioner.
