= Corner Brook (electoral district) =

Provincial electoral district in Newfoundland and Labrador, Canada

Newfoundland and Labrador electoral district
- Boundaries of Corner Brook
- Coordinates: 48.944706°N 57.942125°W; Location of provincial district constituency office in Corner Brook (as of 7 December 2018)

Provincial electoral district
- Legislature: Newfoundland and Labrador House of Assembly
MHA
Jim Parsons
Liberal
- District created: 2015
- First contested: 2015
- Last contested: 2025

Demographics
- Population (2011): 13,718
- Electors (2015): 10,495
- Area (km²): 50
- Census division: Division No. 5
- Census subdivision: Corner Brook (part)

Corner Brook is a provincial electoral district in Newfoundland and Labrador, Canada. In the 2011 census, there were 13,718 people living in the district.

Corner Brook merges most of the former district of Humber East and most of the former district of Humber West. The district was created following the 2015 electoral districts boundaries review.

The district consists of parts of the city of Corner Brook.

== Members of the House of Assembly ==
The district has elected the following members of the House of Assembly:

Assembly	Years	Member	Party
Riding created from Humber East and Humber West.
48th	2015–2019	Gerry Byrne	Liberal
49th	2019–2021	Gerry Byrne	Liberal
50th	2021–2025	Gerry Byrne	Liberal
51st	2025–present	Jim Parsons	Liberal

== Election results ==
Graph of election results (minor parties that never got 2% of the vote or did not run consistently are omitted) View source data.

2025 Newfoundland and Labrador general election
Party	Candidate	Votes	%	±%
Liberal	Jim Parsons	2,347	56.94	-9.60
Progressive Conservative	Charles Pender	1,420	34.45	+0.99
New Democratic	Jean Graham	355	8.61	
Total valid votes		4,122		
Total rejected ballots				
Turnout				
Eligible voters				
Liberal hold		Swing		-5.29

2021 Newfoundland and Labrador general election
Party	Candidate	Votes	%	±%
Liberal	Gerry Byrne	2,593	66.54	+17.69
Progressive Conservative	Tom Stewart	1,304	33.46	-0.27
Total valid votes		3,897	98.58	
Total rejected ballots		56	1.42	
Turnout		3,953	38.44	
Eligible voters		10,284		
Liberal hold		Swing		+8.98
Source(s) "Officially Nominated Candidates General Election 2021" (PDF). Elections Newfoundland and Labrador. "NL Election 2021 (Unofficial Results)".

2019 Newfoundland and Labrador general election
Party	Candidate	Votes	%	±%
Liberal	Gerry Byrne	2,436	48.85	-17.83
Progressive Conservative	Tom Stewart	1,682	33.73	+17.09
New Democratic	Mary B. Feltham	733	14.70	-1.99
Independent	Wayne Bennett	136	2.73	–
Total valid votes		4,987	98.73	
Total rejected ballots		64	1.27	+0.84
Turnout		5,051	49.87	+4.63
Eligible voters		10,128		
Liberal hold		Swing		-17.46

2015 Newfoundland and Labrador general election
Party	Candidate	Votes	%	±%
Liberal	Gerry Byrne	3,121	66.67	–
New Democratic	Holly Pike	781	16.68	–
Progressive Conservative	Neville Wheaton	779	16.64	–
Total valid votes		4,681	99.57	–
Total rejected ballots		20	0.43	–
Turnout		4,701	45.24	–
Eligible voters		10,391		
Liberal notional hold		Swing		–
Source: Elections Newfoundland and Labrador

== See also ==
- List of Newfoundland and Labrador provincial electoral districts
- Canadian provincial electoral districts
