= Jim Parsons (politician) =

Canadian politician

Jim Parsons MHA

Member of the Newfoundland and Labrador House of Assembly for Corner Brook
- Incumbent
- Assumed office October 14, 2025
- Preceded by: Gerry Byrne

Mayor of Corner Brook
- In office 2017–2025
- Preceded by: Charles Pender
- Succeeded by: Linda Chaisson

Personal details
- Party: Liberal
- Education: Harvard University

Larry (Jim) James Parsons is a Canadian politician from the Liberal Party. In the 2025 Newfoundland and Labrador general election he elected to the Newfoundland and Labrador House of Assembly in Corner Brook.

== Career ==
Parsons is a graduate of Harvard University. He was mayor of Corner Brook. Parsons is a member of the Qalipu First Nation.

Since the Liberals lost the election, Parsons entered the House of Assembly in opposition. He is the opposition critic for the ministries of Municipal and Community Affairs, Community Engagement, and the Registrar General.

== Election results ==
2025 Newfoundland and Labrador general election: Corner Brook
| Party | Candidate | Votes | % | ±% |
|---|---|---|---|---|
| Liberal | Jim Parsons | 2,347 | 56.94 | -9.60 |
| Progressive Conservative | Charles Pender | 1,420 | 34.45 | +0.99 |
| New Democratic | Jean Graham | 355 | 8.61 | |
| Total valid votes | | 4,122 | | |
| Total rejected ballots | | | | |
| Turnout | | | | |
| Eligible voters | | | | |
| Liberal hold | | Swing | | -5.29 |
