= Grey Islands =

Island pair in Newfoundland and Labrador, Canada

Coordinates: 50°50′N 55°35′W

Grey Islands.

The Canadian Grey Islands consist of two islands, Bell Island and Groais Island, located off Newfoundland's Great Northern Peninsula to the east in the Atlantic Ocean.

Largest of them is the southern Bell Island with an area of 88 km^{2}. The islands are hilly, rising to over 152 m. (500 ft). The village of Grey Islands Harbour was situated at the southern end of Bell Island; the village of Sandy Cove was on Groais Island. Both islands had been evacuated by the early 1970s.

== See also ==
- Humber—St. Barbe—Baie Verte
- List of islands of Canada

== Sources ==
- "Grey Islands". The Columbia Gazetteer of North America, 2000.
