= Fred Mifflin =

Canadian politician

The Honourable Fred J. Mifflin

Member of Parliament for Bonavista-Trinity-Conception
- In office 1988–2000
- Preceded by: Morrissey Johnson
- Succeeded by: Brian Tobin

Minister of Fisheries and Oceans
- In office 1996–1997
- Preceded by: Brian Tobin
- Succeeded by: David Anderson

Minister of Veterans Affairs
- In office 1997–1999
- Preceded by: Doug Young
- Succeeded by: George Baker

Secretary of State for the Atlantic Canada Opportunities Agency
- In office 1997–1999
- Preceded by: Lawrence MacAulay
- Succeeded by: George Baker

Personal details
- Born: February 6, 1938 Bonavista, Dominion of Newfoundland
- Died: October 5, 2013 (aged 75) Ottawa, Ontario, Canada
- Party: Liberal Party of Canada
- Spouse: Gwenneth Mifflin
- Children: 3
- Education: Royal Naval College of Canada; Canadian Forces Staff College; United States Naval War College; National Defence College
- Occupation: politician
- Profession: naval officer

Rear-Admiral Fred J. Mifflin, PC CD (February 6, 1938 – October 5, 2013) was a rear admiral in the Canadian Forces and a politician.

Mifflin was born in Bonavista, Newfoundland, in 1938.

== Naval career ==
Mifflin joined the RCN in 1954 after serving as a Sea Cadet and rose through the ranks as an officer:

- Executive officer HMCS Saguenay 1968–1969
- Command secretary, Maritime Command 1969–1970
- Commanding officer HMCS Skeena 1970–1972
- Captain, National Defence Headquarters Evaluation Branch 1973–1976
- Commander, First Canadian Destroyer Squadron 1976–1978
- Director of Maritime Requirements 1978–1979
- Director, National Defence Headquarters Secretariat 1979–1981
- Chief of staff, Maritime Command Headquarters, Plans and Ops 1981–1984
- Chief of staff, Maritime Command Headquarters, Personnel 1984–1985
- Rear admiral and deputy commander, Maritime Command 1985–1987

== Political career ==
After retiring from 32 years of service in the Royal Canadian Navy, Mifflin entered politics and was elected to the House of Commons of Canada in the 1988 election. Mifflin became the Liberal Member of Parliament (MP) for the Newfoundland riding of Bonavista-Trinity-Conception.

After the Liberals came to power under the leadership of Jean Chrétien in the 1993 election, Mifflin was appointed parliamentary secretary to the ministers of national defence and veterans affairs.

In 1996, he was appointed to the Canadian Cabinet as Minister of Fisheries and Oceans. In a 1997 cabinet shuffle, he was appointed Minister of Veterans Affairs and Secretary of State for the Atlantic Canada Opportunities Agency. Mifflin decided that he wasn't going to run in the next general election, and was dropped from Cabinet in August 1999. He did not run for re-election in the 2000 election.

He supported Stéphane Dion for the leadership of the Liberal Party. Mifflin died on October 5, 2013, with his wife at his side.

26th Canadian Ministry (1993–2003) – Cabinet of Jean Chrétien
Cabinet posts (2)
Predecessor	Office	Successor
Doug Young	Minister of Veterans Affairs; 1997–1999	George Baker
Brian Tobin	Minister of Fisheries and Oceans; 1996–1997	David Anderson
