= Bell Island (Grey Islands) =

Island located off of Newfoundland

Coordinates: 50°44′31″N 55°33′58″W

Bell Island, Grey Islands.

Bell Island is one of the Grey Islands, located off Newfoundland's Great Northern Peninsula to the east in the Atlantic Ocean. With an area of 88 km^{2}. The island is hilly, rising to over 152 m. (500 ft). The village of Grey Islands Harbour is situated at the southern end of the island.

== See also ==
- Humber—St. Barbe—Baie Verte
- List of islands of Newfoundland and Labrador

== Sources ==
- "Grey Islands". The Columbia Gazetteer of North America, 2000.
