= Dave Rooney =

Canadian politician

Member of Parliament for Bonavista—Trinity—Conception
- In office 30 October 1972 – 3 September 1984
- Preceded by: Frank Moores
- Succeeded by: Morrissey Johnson

Personal details
- Born: Richard David Rooney; 13 August 1937 Lower Island Cove, Newfoundland and Labrador
- Died: 9 November 2006 (aged 69)
- Party: Liberal
- Spouse: Ruth Gale
- Relations: Son David Rooney

Richard David Rooney (13 August 1937 – 9 November 2006) was a Canadian politician.

Born in Lower Island Cove, Newfoundland and Labrador, he was a teacher before being elected to the House of Commons of Canada for the riding of Bonavista—Trinity—Conception in the 1972 federal election. A Liberal, he was re-elected three more times in 1974, 1979, and 1980 before being defeated in the 1984 election.
