= Humber—St. Barbe—Baie Verte =

Former federal electoral district in Newfoundland and Labrador, Canada

Coordinates: 49.7905°N 56.9110°W

Newfoundland and Labrador electoral district
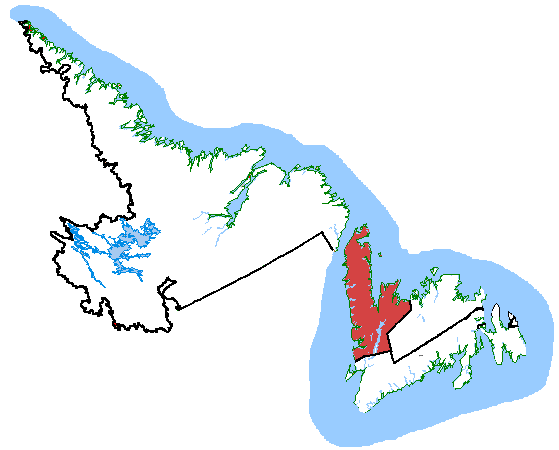
- Humber—St. Barbe—Baie Verte in relation to other Newfoundland and Labrador ridings

Defunct federal electoral district
- Legislature: House of Commons
- District created: 1987
- District abolished: 2013
- First contested: 1988
- Last contested: 2011
- District webpage: profile, map

Demographics
- Population (2011): 71,563
- Electors (2011): 59,797
- Area (km²): 31,075.06
- Census division(s): Division No. 5, Division No. 6, Division No. 8, Division No. 9
- Census subdivision(s): Corner Brook, Deer Lake, Pasadena, Springdale, St. Anthony

Humber—St. Barbe—Baie Verte was a federal electoral district in Newfoundland and Labrador, Canada; it was represented in the House of Commons of Canada from 1988 to 2015.

== Demographics ==
Ethnic groups: 96.2% White, 3.4% Native Canadian
Languages: 99.3% English
Religions: 73.8% Protestant, 23.2% Catholic, 2.1% no affiliation
Average income: $20 573

According to the 2006 Census, Humber—St. Barbe—Baie Verte was the riding with the highest percentage of people with English ethnic origin in all of Canada (46.8% - multiple responses).

== Geography ==
The district included the Great Northern Peninsula, the Baie Verte Peninsula, the area along the southwest coast of Notre Dame Bay, the Bay of Islands, and the Corner Brook area. It also included most of Glover Island, the Grey Islands (Groais Island and Bell Island), and the Horse Islands.

The neighbouring ridings were Labrador, Bonavista—Gander—Grand Falls—Windsor, and Random—Burin—St. George's.

According to Elections Canada, the geographic boundaries for the 39th General Election (2006) were:

"All that area consisting of that part of the Island of Newfoundland lying westerly and northerly of a line described as follows: commencing at a point midway between the towns of Triton and Leading Tickles in Notre Dame Bay; thence southerly in said bay to Seal Bay; thence southerly in a straight line to Frozen Ocean Lake at approximate latitude 49°11'N and approximate longitude 55°41'W; thence westerly in a straight line to Hinds Lake; thence southerly in a straight line to the mouth of Lloyds River at the westernmost extremity of Red Indian Lake; thence westerly in a straight line to Georges Lake; thence westerly in a straight line to Bluff Head on the eastern shoreline of Port au Port Bay. Including St. John Island, Quirpon Island, Sop's Island, Bell Island and Groais Island of the Grey Islands, Horse Islands and all other islands adjacent to the shoreline of the above-described area."

== History ==
The electoral district was created in 1987 from Grand Falls—White Bay—Labrador and Humber—Port au Port—St. Barbe. Following the 2012 federal electoral redistribution, this riding was dissolved and divided between Long Range Mountains (80%) and Coast of Bays—Central—Notre Dame (20%), with the new boundaries taking effect at the 2015 federal election.

=== Members of Parliament ===
This riding has elected the following members of Parliament:

Parliament	Years	Member	Party
Humber—St. Barbe—Baie Verte; Riding created from Grand Falls—White Bay—Labrador and Humber—Port au Port—St. Barbe
34th	1988–1993	Brian Tobin	Liberal
35th	1993–1996	Brian Tobin	Liberal
35th	1996–1997	Gerry Byrne	Liberal
36th	1997–2000	Gerry Byrne	Liberal
37th	2000–2004	Gerry Byrne	Liberal
38th	2004–2006	Gerry Byrne	Liberal
39th	2006–2008	Gerry Byrne	Liberal
40th	2008–2011	Gerry Byrne	Liberal
41st	2011–2015	Gerry Byrne	Liberal
Riding dissolved into Long Range Mountains and Coast of Bays—Central—Notre Dame

== Election results ==
=== Humber—St. Barbe—Baie Verte, 2003 representation order ===
2011 Canadian federal election
Party	Candidate	Votes	%	±%	Expenditures
Liberal	Gerry Byrne	17,119	57.04	-10.88	$40,692.36
Conservative	Trevor Taylor	7,559	25.18	+14.56	$34,234.84
New Democratic	Shelley Senior	4,751	15.83	-1.97	$6,860.99
Independent	Wayne Ronald Bennett	332	1.11	-2.55	$2,100.81
Green	Robin Gosse	253	0.84	–	$0.00
Total valid votes/expense limit		30,014	100.0	–	$93,645.93
Total rejected, unmarked and declined ballots		97	0.32	-0.25	
Turnout		30,111	50.94	+6.67	
Eligible voters		59,109			
Liberal hold		Swing		-12.72	
Change for Independent candidate Wayne Roland Bennett is based on results from Newfoundland and Labrador First.

2008 Canadian federal election
Party	Candidate	Votes	%	±%	Expenditures
Liberal	Gerry Byrne	17,943	67.92	+15.02	$40,633.78
New Democratic	Mark Kennedy	4,703	17.80	+2.90	$2,377.46
Conservative	Lorne Robinson	2,806	10.62	-20.54	$11,451.29
Newfoundland and Labrador First	Wayne Ronald Bennett	967	3.66	–	$14,072.95
Total valid votes/expense limit		26,419	100.0	–	$90,812
Total rejected, unmarked and declined ballots		150	0.57	-0.01	
Turnout		26,472	44.27	-10.55	
Eligible voters		59,797			
Liberal hold		Swing		+6.06	

2006 Canadian federal election
Party	Candidate	Votes	%	±%	Expenditures
Liberal	Gerry Byrne	17,208	52.90	-9.66	$51,137.92
Conservative	Cyril Pelley, Jr.	10,137	31.16	+8.21	$40,695.65
New Democratic	Holly Pike	4,847	14.90	+1.76	$6,539.20
Green	Martin Hanzalek	339	1.04	-0.31	none listed
Total valid votes/expense limit		32,531	100.0	–	$84,468
Total rejected, unmarked and declined ballots		191	0.58	+0.13	
Turnout		32,722	54.82	+7.05	
Eligible voters		59,685			
Liberal hold		Swing		-8.94	

2004 Canadian federal election
Party	Candidate	Votes	%	±%	Expenditures
Liberal	Gerry Byrne	17,820	62.56	+14.14	$60,642.45
Conservative	Wynanne Downer	6,538	22.95	-4.13	$49,487.66
New Democratic	Holly Pike	3,743	13.14	-11.36	$5,864.44
Green	Steve Durant	384	1.35	–	$177.50
Total valid votes/expense limit		28,485	100.0	–	$82,511
Total rejected, unmarked and declined ballots		128	0.45		
Turnout		28,613	47.77		
Eligible voters		59,893			
Liberal notional hold		Swing		+9.14	
Changes from 2000 are based on redistributed results. Change for the Conservatives is based on the combined total of the Progressive Conservatives and the Canadian Alliance.

2000 federal election redistributed results
Party	Vote	%
Liberal	16,814	48.42
New Democratic	8,509	24.50
Progressive Conservative	7,404	21.32
Alliance	1,999	5.76

=== Previous elections ===
2000 Canadian federal election
Party	Candidate	Votes	%	±%
Liberal	Gerry Byrne	15,446	48.79	+8.95
New Democratic	Trevor Taylor	8,173	25.82	+11.22
Progressive Conservative	Peter McBreairty	6,340	20.03	-19.03
Alliance	Murdock Cole	1,698	5.33	-1.17
Total votes		31,657	100.00	
Total rejected ballots		117	0.37	
Turnout		31,774	57.99	

Canadian Alliance changes from 1997 are based on the results of its predecessor, the Reform Party.

1997 Canadian federal election
Party	Candidate	Votes	%	±%
Liberal	Gerry Byrne	12,057	39.84	-15.85
Progressive Conservative	Art Bull	11,825	39.06	+15.56
New Democratic	Joan Scott	4,421	14.60	+12.13
Reform	Randy Wells	1,969	6.50	-11.84
Total votes		30,272	100.00	
Total rejected ballots		129	0.42	
Turnout		30,401	54.93	

Canadian federal by-election, 25 March 1996
Party	Candidate	Votes	%	±%
On the resignation of Brian Tobin, 25 January 1996
Liberal	Gerry Byrne	12,453	55.69	-26.49
Progressive Conservative	Danny Kane	5,253	23.50	+8.12
Reform	Deon Hancock	4,099	18.34	
New Democratic	Coleen Dingwell-Corbin	554	2.47	+0.03
Total votes		22,359	100.00	

1993 Canadian federal election
Party	Candidate	Votes	%	±%
Liberal	Brian Tobin	25,920	82.18	+15.15
Progressive Conservative	Margaret Ann O'Rourke	4,852	15.38	-13.91
New Democratic	Linda Soper	770	2.44	-1.24
Total votes		31,542	100.00	

1988 Canadian federal election
Party	Candidate	Votes	%
Liberal	Brian Tobin	26,259	67.03
Progressive Conservative	Terry Young	11,477	29.29
New Democratic	Marie Newhook	1,441	3.68
Total votes		39,177	100.00

== See also ==
- List of Canadian electoral districts
- Historical federal electoral districts of Canada
