= Gerry Byrne (politician) =

Canadian politician

The Honourable Gerry Byrne PC ECNL
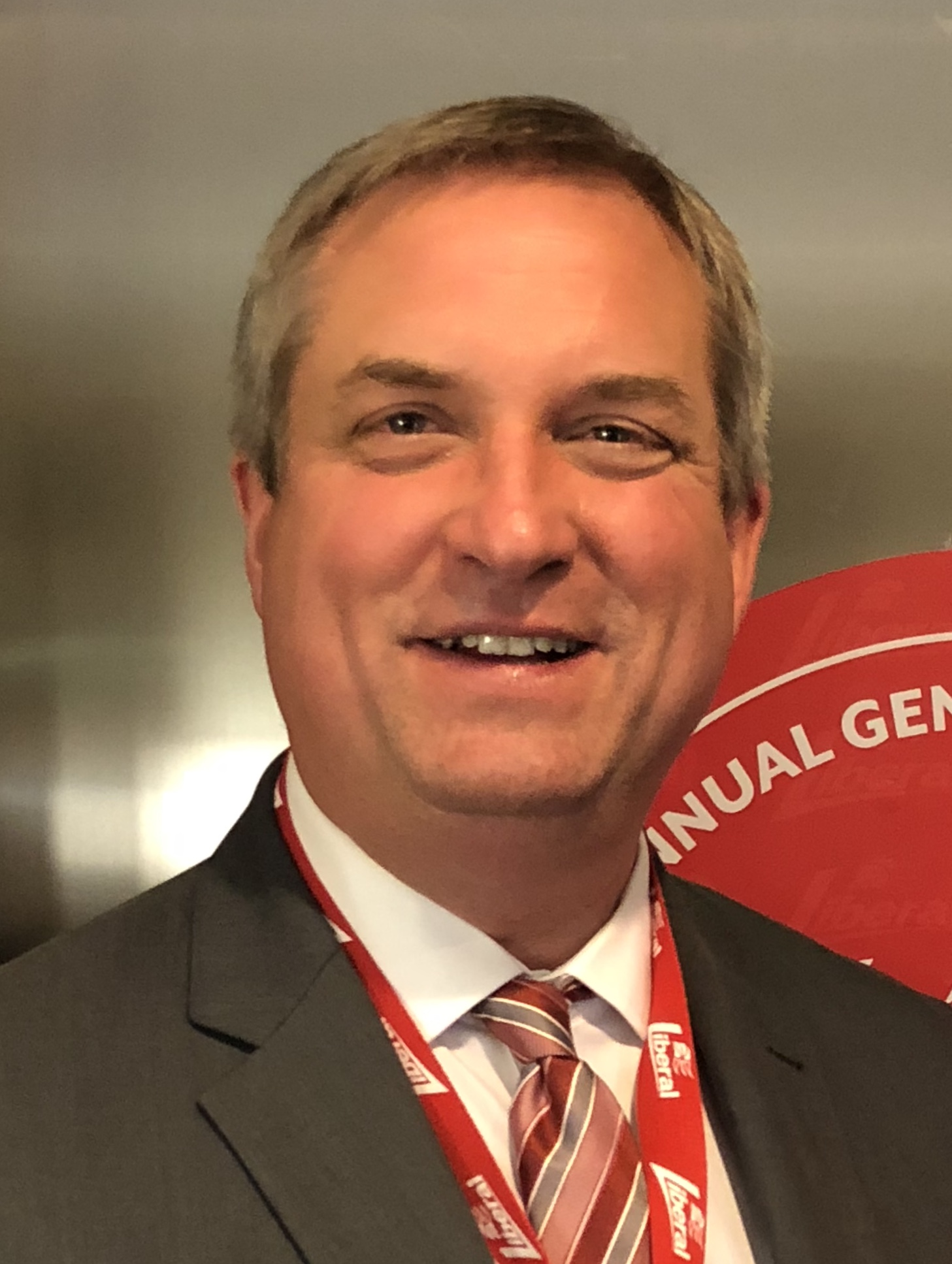
- Gerry Byrne in 2018

Minister of Fisheries, Forestry, and Agriculture Minister Responsible for the Public Procurement Agency
- In office July 19, 2024 – May 9, 2025
- Premier: Andrew Furey
- Preceded by: Elvis Loveless
- Succeeded by: Lisa Dempster

Minister of Jobs, Immigration and Growth, and Minister Responsible for Workplace NL
- In office August 19, 2020 – July 19, 2024
- Premier: Andrew Furey
- Preceded by: Christopher Mitchelmore
- Succeeded by: Sarah Stoodley
- In office May 9, 2025 – October 29, 2025
- Preceded by: Sarah Stoodley
- Succeeded by: Lin Paddock

Minister of Fisheries and Land Resources
- In office July 31, 2017 – August 19, 2020
- Premier: Dwight Ball
- Preceded by: Steve Crocker
- Succeeded by: Elvis Loveless

Minister of Advanced Education and Skills
- In office December 14, 2015 – July 31, 2017
- Premier: Dwight Ball
- Preceded by: Clyde Jackman
- Succeeded by: Steve Crocker

Member of the Newfoundland and Labrador House of Assembly for Corner Brook
- In office November 30, 2015 – October 14, 2025
- Preceded by: Riding Established
- Succeeded by: Jim Parsons

Member of Parliament for Humber—St. Barbe—Baie Verte
- In office January 25, 1996 – August 4, 2015
- Preceded by: Brian Tobin
- Succeeded by: Riding Dissolved

Minister of State for the Atlantic Canada Opportunities Agency
- In office January 15, 2002 – December 11, 2003
- Prime Minister: Jean Chrétien
- Preceded by: Robert Thibault
- Succeeded by: Joe McGuire

Parliamentary Secretary to the Minister of Intergovernmental Affairs
- In office July 20, 2004 – November 29, 2005
- Minister: Lucienne Robillard

Parliamentary Secretary to the President of the King's Privy Council for Canada
- In office July 20, 2004 – November 29, 2005
- Minister: Lucienne Robillard

Parliamentary Secretary to the Minister of Health
- In office December 12, 2003 – June 27, 2004
- Minister: Pierre Pettigrew

Parliamentary Secretary to the Minister of Natural Resources
- In office July 10, 1997 – August 31, 1999
- Minister: Ralph Goodale

Personal details
- Born: September 27, 1966 (age 60) Corner Brook, Newfoundland and Labrador
- Party: Liberal Party of Canada
- Spouse: Denise Gibbons
- Children: 1 (Gerry Jr.)
- Education: Dalhousie University
- Profession: Political assistant

Gerry Byrne, PC, ECNL (born September 27, 1966) is a Canadian politician who was a Liberal Member of Parliament from 1996 to 2015 representing Humber—St. Barbe—Baie Verte, Newfoundland and Labrador, and a cabinet minister in the government of Jean Chrétien. He holds the record as the youngest federal Cabinet Minister to be appointed from Newfoundland and Labrador, being sworn in at 35. From 2015 to 2025, he served as MHA for Corner Brook. Byrne served in provincial cabinet during the Ball, Furey, and Hogan governments.

== Education ==
Byrne received a Bachelor of Science in environmental science from Dalhousie University.

== Federal politics ==
Byrne was a Member of Parliament from 1996-2015 when he won a by-election in the province of Newfoundland and Labrador to succeed Brian Tobin. Tobin resigned to run in the 1996 Newfoundland provincial election for Premier. Byrne was re-elected in the 1997, 2000, 2004, 2006, 2008, and 2011 elections. In the 2006 election he had one of the highest margins of victory in Atlantic Canada. Byrne did not stand in the 2015 election and retired from parliament.

In the Liberal Party's 2006 leadership election, he started out supporting Maurizio Bevilacqua, after Bevilacqua dropped out he supported Michael Ignatieff. Ignatieff placed second in the race to winner Stéphane Dion. Ignatieff became Leader of the Liberal Party two years later, and was again supported by Byrne.

In the Liberal Party's 2013 leadership election, Byrne supported Montreal MP Justin Trudeau.

=== Committees ===
Byrne served on seventeen committees during his federal tenure. He sat as a member of the Standing Committee of Transport, Agriculture and Agrifood, Natural Resources and Government Operations, Industry, Aboriginal Affairs and Northern Development, as Vice-Chair of Public Accounts, Transport and Government Operations, Health, Library of Parliament, Fisheries and Oceans, Industry Science and Technology, Transport, Infrastructure and Communities, and as Vice-Chair of Government Operations and Estimates.

Byrne also served on the Special Joint Committee to amend Section 93 of the Constitution Act, 1867 concerning the Quebec School System, as Co-Chair of Special Joint Committee on the Amendment to Term 17 of the Terms of Union of Newfoundland, as well as Vice-Chair of the Subcommittee on Agenda and Procedure of the Standing Committee on Public Accounts.

=== Parliamentary Secretary ===
Byrne served as Parliamentary Secretary for multiple ministries in the governments of Jean Chrétien and Paul Martin. He served as Parliamentary Secretary to the Minister of Natural Resources (1997-1999), Parliamentary Secretary to the Minister of Health (2002-2004), and as Parliamentary Secretary to the President of the Queen's Privy Council for Canada and Minister of Intergovernmental Affairs (2004-2005).

=== Cabinet minister ===
He was Minister of State for the Atlantic Canada Opportunities Agency from 2002 to 2003. When Paul Martin became Prime Minister in 2003, Byrne was not assigned back to his former Cabinet post; he was succeeded by Joe McGuire.

=== Comments on PETA pie incident ===
On January 25, 2010, Fisheries Minister, Gail Shea was pied while giving a speech at the Canada Centre for Inland Waters. An American PETA activist, Emily McCoy, was later arrested in Burlington, charged with assault in connection with the incident. PETA has taken public responsibility for the incident, saying that it was part of a broader campaign against the Canadian Government's support of the seal hunt.

In response to the pieing of the Fisheries Minister, Byrne denounced the attack on the minister as an act of terrorism. He commented on the 26th, "When someone actually coaches or conducts criminal behaviour to impose a political agenda on each and every other citizen of Canada, that does seem to me to meet the test of a terrorist organization." Byrne continued to say, "I am calling on the Government of Canada to actually investigate whether or not this organization, PETA, is acting as a terrorist organization under the test that exists under Canadian law." In response to his interpretation of Canadian law, PETA president Ingrid Newkirk said Byrne's reaction was "a silly, chest-beating exercise."

== Provincial politics ==
In the provincial Liberal Party's 2013 leadership race, it was widely speculated that Byrne would enter the race. Byrne later decided not to run and supported Humber Valley MHA Dwight Ball. Byrne retired from federal politics at the 2015 election in order to run successfully provincially later that year becoming MHA for Corner Brook. Byrne was re-elected in the 2019 provincial election. Byrne was re-elected in the 2021 provincial election.

During the Provincial Liberal Party's 2025 leadership race, it was again speculated that Byrne would enter the race as a front-runner. He later endorsed Windsor Lake MHA John Hogan.

On July 17, 2025, Byrne announced that he would not seek re-election.

=== Cabinet minister (Provincial) ===
Following the Ball Liberals forming government in the 2015 election, Byrne was appointed Minister of Advanced Education, Skills and Labour. He subsequently served as Minister of Fisheries and Land Resources following a 2017 cabinet shuffle.

On August 19, 2020, Byrne was appointed Minister of Immigration, Skills and Labour in the Furey government. On July 19, 2024, he was appointed as Minister of Fisheries, Forestry, and Agriculture and Minister Responsible for the Public Procurement Agency.

On May 9, 2025, Byrne was appointed Minister of Jobs, Immigration and Growth in the John Hogan government.

== Electoral record ==
=== Provincial ===
2021 Newfoundland and Labrador general election: Corner Brook
Party	Candidate	Votes	%	±%
Liberal	Gerry Byrne	2,593	66.54	+17.69
Progressive Conservative	Tom Stewart	1,304	33.46	-0.27
Total valid votes		3,897	98.58	
Total rejected ballots		56	1.42	
Turnout		3,953	38.44	
Eligible voters		10,284		
Liberal hold		Swing		+8.98
Source(s) "Officially Nominated Candidates General Election 2021" (PDF). Elections Newfoundland and Labrador. "NL Election 2021 (Unofficial Results)".

2019 Newfoundland and Labrador general election
Party	Candidate	Votes	%	±%
Liberal	Gerry Byrne	2,436	48.8	
Progressive Conservative	Tom Stewart	1,682	33.7	
New Democratic	Mary B. Feltham	733	14.7	
Independent	Wayne Bennett	136	2.7	
Total valid votes				

2015 Newfoundland and Labrador general election: Corner Brook
Party	Candidate	Votes	%
Liberal	Gerry Byrne	3,121	66.67
New Democratic	Holly Pike	781	16.68
Progressive Conservative	Neville Wheaton	779	16.65
Total valid votes		4,681	100.0
Turnout		45.03	
Eligible voters		10,397	

=== Federal ===
2011 Canadian federal election: Humber-St. Barbe-Baie Verte
Party	Candidate	Votes	%	±%	Expenditures
Liberal	Gerry Byrne	17,119	57.04	−10.88	
Conservative	Trevor Taylor	7,559	25.18	+14.56	
New Democratic	Shelley Senior	4,751	15.83	−1.97	
Independent	Wayne Ronald Bennett	332	1.11	−2.55	
Green	Robin Gosse	253	0.84	–	
Total valid votes/expense limit		30,014	100.00	–	
Total rejected ballots		97	0.32	−0.25	
Turnout		30,111	50.91	+6.64	
Eligible voters		59,149	–	–	
Liberal hold		Swing		-12.72	

2008 Canadian federal election: Humber-St. Barbe-Baie Verte
Party	Candidate	Votes	%	±%	Expenditures
Liberal	Gerry Byrne	17,943	67.92	+15.02	$36,525
New Democratic	Mark Kennedy	4,703	17.80	+2.90	$2,495
Conservative	Lorne Robinson	2,806	10.62	−20.54	$11,451
Newfoundland and Labrador First	Wayne Ronald Bennett	967	3.66	–	$3,719
Total valid votes/expense limit		26,419	100.00	$90,812	
Total rejected ballots		150	0.57	−0.01	
Turnout		26,472	44.27	−10.3	
Eligible voters		59,797	–	–	
Liberal hold		Swing		+17.78	

2006 Canadian federal election: Humber-St. Barbe-Baie Verte
Party	Candidate	Votes	%	±%	Expenditures
Liberal	Gerry Byrne	17,208	52.90	-9.66	$52,162
Conservative	Cyril Pelley, Jr.	10,137	31.16	+8.21	$41,467
New Democratic	Holly Pike	4,847	14.90	+1.76	$5,133
Green	Martin Hanzalek	339	1.04	−0.31	
Total valid votes/expense limit		32,531	100.00	$84,468	
Total rejected ballots		191	0.58	+0.13	
Turnout		32,722	54.6	+6.8	
Liberal hold		Swing		−8.94	

2004 Canadian federal election: Humber-St. Barbe-Baie Verte
Party	Candidate	Votes	%	±%	Expenditures
Liberal	Gerry Byrne	17,820	62.56	+13.77	$61,737
Conservative	Wynanne Downer	6,538	22.95	−2.41	$49,410
New Democratic	Holly Pike	3,743	13.14	−12.68	$5,878
Green	Steve Durant	384	1.35	–	$178
Total valid votes/expense limit		28,485	100.00	$82,511	
Total rejected ballots		128	0.45		
Turnout		28,613	47.77		
Liberal hold		Swing		+8.09	
Change from 2000 is based on redistributed results. Conservative Party change is based on the combination of Canadian Alliance and Progressive Conservative Party totals.

2000 Canadian federal election: Humber-St. Barbe-Baie Verte
Party	Candidate	Votes	%	±%
Liberal	Gerry Byrne	15,446	48.79	+8.95
New Democratic	Trevor Taylor	8,173	25.82	+11.22
Progressive Conservative	Peter McBreairty	6,340	20.03	−19.03
Alliance	Murdock Cole	1,698	5.33	−1.17
Total votes		31,657	100.00	
Total rejected ballots		117	0.37	
Turnout		31,774	57.99	
Liberal hold		Swing		+7.00
Canadian Alliance changes from 1997 are based on the results of its predecessor, the Reform Party.

1997 Canadian federal election: Humber-St. Barbe-Baie Verte
Party	Candidate	Votes	%	±%
Liberal	Gerry Byrne	12,057	39.84	−15.85
Progressive Conservative	Art Bull	11,825	39.06	+15.56
New Democratic	Joan Scott	4,421	14.60	+12.13
Reform	Randy Wells	1,969	6.50	−11.84
Total votes		30,272	100.00	
Total rejected ballots		129	0.42	
Turnout		30,401	54.93	
Liberal hold		Swing		−15.71

Canadian federal by-election, March 25, 1996: Humber-St. Barbe-Baie Verte
Party	Candidate	Votes	%	±%
Liberal	Gerry Byrne	12,453	55.69	−26.49
Progressive Conservative	Danny Kane	5,253	23.50	+8.12
Reform	Deon Hancock	4,099	18.34	–
New Democratic	Coleen Dingwell-Corbin	554	2.47	+0.03
Total votes		22,359	100.00	
Liberal hold		Swing		−17.31
By-election due to the resignation of Brian Tobin, January 25, 1996

Newfoundland and Labrador provincial government of Dwight Ball
Cabinet post (1)
Predecessor	Office	Successor
Clyde Jackman	Minister of Advanced Education & Skills; December 14, 2015 – July 31, 2017	Al Hawkins
