= Scott Simms =

Canadian politician (born 1969)

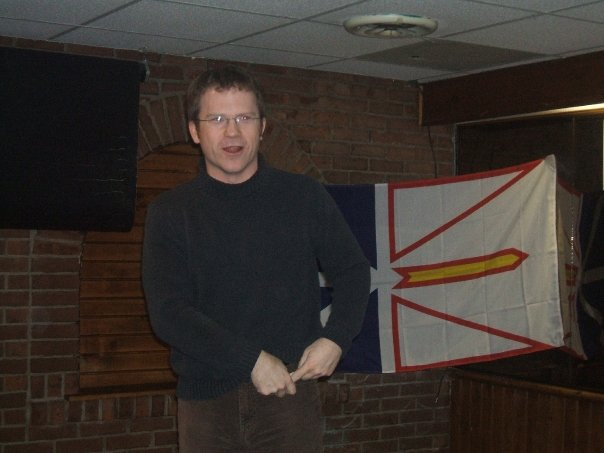

Member of Parliament for Coast of Bays—Central—Notre Dame Bonavista—Gander—Grand Falls—Windsor (2004–2015)
- In office June 28, 2004 – September 20, 2021
- Preceded by: Rex Barnes
- Succeeded by: Clifford Small

Chairman of the Standing Committee on Canadian Heritage
- In office February 19, 2020 – September 20, 2021
- Preceded by: Julie Dabrusin
- Succeeded by: Hedy Fry

Chairman of the Standing Committee on Fisheries and Oceans
- In office February 16, 2016 – April 19, 2018
- Preceded by: Rodney Weston
- Succeeded by: Bernadette Jordan

Personal details
- Born: August 12, 1969 (age 56) Bishop's Falls, Newfoundland and Labrador, Canada
- Party: Liberal
- Profession: Journalist

Scott Simms (born August 12, 1969) is a Canadian politician. He was the Liberal Member of Parliament for the Newfoundland and Labrador riding of Coast of Bays—Central—Notre Dame from 2004 until 2021.

== Early life ==
Scott Simms was born on August 12, 1969, in Bishop's Falls, Newfoundland.

In 1990, while a student at Mount Allison University, Simms started in politics and campaigning when he acted as the official agent and campaign manager for Bryan Gold the Rhinoceros Party candidate in a federal byelection in the Beauséjour riding. Simms graduated from Mount Allison University with a Bachelor in Commerce and Loyalist College in Journalism. Before entering elected politics, Simms worked for The Weather Network, prior to which he had worked as a radio reporter in Gander and Grand Falls-Windsor. He was an active campaigner for the "No" side in the 1995 Quebec referendum.

== Politics ==
Simms was elected in the 2004 election and defeated four other candidates, including Conservative incumbent Rex Barnes. Simms was re-elected on Jan. 23, 2006, beating Conservative candidate Aaron Hynes by approximately 5,000 votes. Simms was re-elected in the 2008 federal election.

Simms was a member of the Standing Committee on Canadian Heritage and the Standing Committee on Fisheries and Oceans. Since January 18, 2006, he has been the critic for the Minister of Fisheries and Oceans. He was the critic for the Minister for the Atlantic Canada Opportunities Agency from February 23, 2006 until January 17, 2007.

Simms is also now known by a number of people who live on the west coast of Ireland following the voyage of one of his election posters across the Atlantic Ocean to Keem Bay in the village of Dooagh on Achill Island, County Mayo. The story was published by a local news paper called The Mayo News after a lifeguard at the beach, Conal Dixon, found the poster washed up on the sand.

On May 2, 2011, Simms was again re-elected. He defeated Hynes in a re-match by approximately 9,200 votes, with a total of 17,895 votes in his riding.

In 2012, Simms was the only Liberal to join the Conservatives in voting to repeal Section 13 of the Canadian Human Rights Act, which dealt with communication of messages "likely to expose a person or persons to hatred or contempt."

In 2013, Simms was courted by the supporters in the Liberal Party of Newfoundland and Labrador to run for the provincial leadership in the 2013 leadership election, but ultimately declined to focus on federal politics. Simms was re-elected in the 2015 federal election.

In April 2018, Simms was removed as Chairman of the Standing Committee on Fisheries and Oceans as a result of voting in favour of a Conservative party motion opposing changes to the Canada Summer Jobs program.

Simms was re-elected in the 2019 federal election. Simms served as the Chair of the Standing Committee on Canadian Heritage.

Simms was defeated in the 2021 federal election losing to conservative candidate Clifford Small.

== Electoral record ==
2021 Canadian federal election: Coast of Bays—Central—Notre Dame
Party	Candidate	Votes	%	±%	Expenditures
Conservative	Clifford Small	14,927	46.89	+11.55	$59,241.94
Liberal	Scott Simms	14,646	46.01	−2.30	$41,577.53
New Democratic	Jamie Ruby	2,261	7.10	−5.25	$0.00
Total valid votes/expense limit		31,834	97.86		$124,135.56
Total rejected ballots		695	2.14	-0.07	
Turnout		32,529	51.12	-3.80	
Registered voters		63,631			
Conservative gain from Liberal		Swing		+6.93	
Source: Elections Canada

2019 Canadian federal election: Coast of Bays—Central—Notre Dame
Party	Candidate	Votes	%	±%	Expenditures
Liberal	Scott Simms	16,514	48.31	-26.52	$48,943.91
Conservative	Alex Bracci	12,081	35.34	+17.02	none listed
New Democratic	Noel Joe	4,224	12.36	+6.26	$6,009.07
Green	Byron White	1,363	3.99	+3.24	$5,899.33
Total valid votes/expense limit		34,182	97.80	-1.79	120,385.86
Total rejected ballots		770	2.20	+1.79	
Turnout		34,952	55.59	-0.12	
Eligible voters		62,880			
Liberal hold		Swing		-26.51	
Source: Elections Canada

2015 Canadian federal election: Coast of Bays—Central—Notre Dame
Party	Candidate	Votes	%	±%	Expenditures
Liberal	Scott Simms	26,523	74.82	+19.90	$53,460.35
Conservative	Kevin O'Brien	6,479	18.28	–12.04	$151,187.70
New Democratic	Claudette Menchenton	2,175	6.14	–7.49	$3,416.01
Green	Elizabeth Perry	271	0.76	–0.12	–
Total valid votes/expense limit		35,448	99.59		$238,355.39
Total rejected ballots		145	0.41	–	
Turnout		35,593	55.71	–	
Eligible voters		63,891			
Liberal notional hold		Swing		+15.97	
Source: Elections Canada

2011 Canadian federal election: Bonavista—Gander—Grand Falls—Windsor
Party	Candidate	Votes	%	±%	Expenditures
Liberal	Scott Simms	17,977	57.70	-12.57	
Conservative	Aaron Hynes	8,595	27.59	+12.36	
New Democratic	Clyde Bridger	4,306	13.82	+1.31	
Green	Robyn Kenny	279	0.90	-1.08	
Total valid votes/Expense limit		31,157	100.00		
Total rejected ballots		151	0.48	-0.02	
Turnout		31,308	36.24	-4.91	
Eligible voters		86,394	–	–	

2008 Canadian federal election: Bonavista—Gander—Grand Falls—Windsor
Party	Candidate	Votes	%	±%	Expenditures
Liberal	Scott Simms	20,089	70.27	+18.3	$23,605
Conservative	Andrew House	4,354	15.23	-25.1	$32,723
New Democratic	Jason Holley	3,577	12.51	+5.5	
Green	Robert O'Connor	568	1.98	+1.3	
Total valid votes/Expense limit		28,588	100.00	$92,537	
Total rejected ballots		145	0.50	0.00	
Turnout		28,733	41.15		
Liberal hold		Swing	+21.7		

2006 Canadian federal election: Bonavista—Gander—Grand Falls—Windsor
Party	Candidate	Votes	%	±%	Expenditures
Liberal	Scott Simms	19,866	52.0	+3.8	$43,240
Conservative	Aaron Hynes	15,376	40.3	-1.3	$75,703
New Democratic	Sandra Cooze	2,668	7.0	-1.1	$10
Green	Judy Davis	265	0.7	-0.4	$0
Total valid votes/Expense limit		38,175	100.0	$86,380	
Total rejected ballots		190	0.50	-0.03	
Turnout		38,365	–		

2004 Canadian federal election: Bonavista—Exploits
Party	Candidate	Votes	%	±%	Expenditures
Liberal	Scott Simms	15,970	48.20	-7.12	$45,455.39
Conservative	Rex Barnes	13,786	41.61	+7.11	$78,934.75
New Democratic	Samuel Robert McLean	2,667	8.05	-2.14	$1,870.00
Green	Ed Sailor White	367	1.11	–	$275.00
Independent	John Lannon	344	1.04	–	none listed
Total valid votes/Expense limit		33,134	100.0	–	$84,760
Total rejected, declined and unmarked ballots		178	0.53		
Turnout		33,312	46.30	-6.67	
Eligible voters		71,944			
Liberal notional hold		Swing		-7.12	
Changes from 2000 are based on redistributed results. Change for the Conservatives is based on the combined totals from the Progressive Conservatives and the Canadian Alliance.
