= Hinds Lake =

Lake in the state of Minnesota, United States

- Location within Minnesota
- Location: Hubbard County, Minnesota
- Coordinates: 46°50′6″N 95°3′5″W
- Type: lake

Hinds Lake is a lake in Hubbard County, in the U.S. state of Minnesota.

Hinds Lake was named for Edward R. Hinds, a Minnesota state legislator.

== See also ==
- List of lakes in Minnesota
