= Bonavista—Trinity—Conception =

Former federal electoral district in Newfoundland and Labrador, Canada

Newfoundland and Labrador electoral district

Defunct federal electoral district
- Legislature: House of Commons
- District created: 1966
- District abolished: 2003
- First contested: 1968
- Last contested: 2002 by-election

Bonavista—Trinity—Conception was a federal electoral district in Newfoundland and Labrador, Canada, that was represented in the House of Commons of Canada from 1968 to 2003. This riding was created in 1966 from parts of Bonavista—Twillingate and Trinity—Conception ridings. It was abolished in 2003 when it was redistributed into Avalon, Bonavista—Exploits and Random—Burin—St. George's ridings.

It initially consisted of the provincial districts of Trinity North, Trinity South, Bay de Verde, Carbonear, Harbour Grace, and Port de Grave, and part of the provincial district of Bonavista South.

== Members of Parliament ==
This riding elected the following members of Parliament:

Parliament	Years	Member	Party
Bonavista—Trinity—Conception; Riding created from Bonavista—Twillingate and Trinity—Conception
28th	1968–1972	Frank Moores	Progressive Conservative
29th	1972–1974	Dave Rooney	Liberal
30th	1974–1979	Dave Rooney	Liberal
31st	1979–1980	Dave Rooney	Liberal
32nd	1980–1984	Dave Rooney	Liberal
33rd	1984–1988	Morrissey Johnson	Progressive Conservative
34th	1988–1993	Fred Mifflin	Liberal
35th	1993–1997	Fred Mifflin	Liberal
36th	1997–2000	Fred Mifflin	Liberal
37th	2000–2002	Brian Tobin	Liberal
37th	2002–2004	John Efford	Liberal
Riding dissolved into Avalon, Bonavista—Exploits and Random—Burin—St. George's

== Election results ==
1968 Canadian federal election
Party	Candidate	Votes	%	±%
Progressive Conservative	Frank Moores	14,823	58.27	
Liberal	James Roy Tucker	10,082	39.64	
New Democratic	Fraser Lloyd March	532	2.09	
Total valid votes		25,437	100.0	

1972 Canadian federal election
Party	Candidate	Votes	%	±%
Liberal	Dave Rooney	12,635	54.91	+15.27
Progressive Conservative	Fred Woodman	8,799	38.24	-20.03
New Democratic	Edgar Alexander Russell	832	3.62	+1.53
Independent	Sam Drover	616	2.68	–
Social Credit	S. Carey Skinner	127	0.55	–
Total valid votes		23,009	100.0	

1974 Canadian federal election
Party	Candidate	Votes	%	±%
Liberal	Dave Rooney	13,258	50.12	-4.79
Progressive Conservative	John Lundrigan	12,117	45.81	+7.57
New Democratic	Ted Noseworthy	1,078	4.08	+0.46
Total valid votes		26,453	100.0	

1979 Canadian federal election
Party	Candidate	Votes	%	±%
Liberal	Dave Rooney	11,314	45.80	-4.32
New Democratic	W.A. Bill Parsons	7,448	30.15	+26.07
Progressive Conservative	Patrick J. Layman	5,943	24.06	-21.75
Total valid votes		24,705	100.0	

1980 Canadian federal election
Party	Candidate	Votes	%	±%
Liberal	Dave Rooney	14,467	52.08	+6.28
Progressive Conservative	Edward G. Bailey	8,388	30.20	+6.14
New Democratic	Anne Robbins	4,619	16.63	-13.52
Independent	Ted Noseworthy	302	1.09	–
Total valid votes		27,776	100.0	

1984 Canadian federal election
Party	Candidate	Votes	%	±%
Progressive Conservative	Morrissey Johnson	19,015	55.04	+24.84
Liberal	Dave Rooney	14,103	40.82	-11.26
New Democratic	Susan Maher	1,432	4.15	-12.48
Total valid votes		34,550	100.0	

1988 Canadian federal election
Party	Candidate	Votes	%	±%
Liberal	Fred Mifflin	21,290	51.34	+10.52
Progressive Conservative	Morrissey Johnson	17,809	42.94	-12.10
New Democratic	Larry Welsh	2,372	5.72	+1.57
Total valid votes		41,471	100.0	

1993 Canadian federal election
Party	Candidate	Votes	%	±%
Liberal	Fred Mifflin	26,435	74.83	23.49
Progressive Conservative	Charlie Brett	7,479	21.17	-21.77
New Democratic	Clem George	1,043	2.95	-2.77
Natural Law	Lynn Tobin	370	1.05	–
Total valid votes		35,327	100.0	

1997 Canadian federal election
Party	Candidate	Votes	%	±%
Liberal	Fred Mifflin	12,929	35.25	-39.58
New Democratic	Fraser March	12,359	33.70	+30.75
Progressive Conservative	Randy Dawe	10,332	28.17	+7.00
Independent	L. Christopher Randell	1,054	2.87	–
Total valid votes		36,674	100.0	

2000 Canadian federal election
Party	Candidate	Votes	%	±%
Liberal	Brian Tobin	22,096	54.38	+19.13
Progressive Conservative	Jim Morgan	11,009	27.10	-1.07
New Democratic	Fraser March	6,473	15.93	-17.77
Alliance	Randy Wayne Dawe	1,051	2.59	–
Total valid votes		40,629	100.0	

Canadian federal by-election, May 13, 2002: Bonavista-Trinity-Conception Resignation of Brian Tobin
Party	Candidate	Votes	%	±%
Liberal	John Efford	18,665	74.82	20.44
Progressive Conservative	Michelle Brazil	5,281	21.17	-5.93
New Democratic	Jim Gill	588	2.36	-13.57
Alliance	David Tulett	166	0.67	-1.92
Green	Chris Bradshaw	139	0.56	–
Independent	Brent Rockwood	106	0.42	–
Total valid votes		24,945	100.0	

== See also ==
- List of Canadian electoral districts
- Historical federal electoral districts of Canada
