= Victoria Lake (Newfoundland and Labrador) =

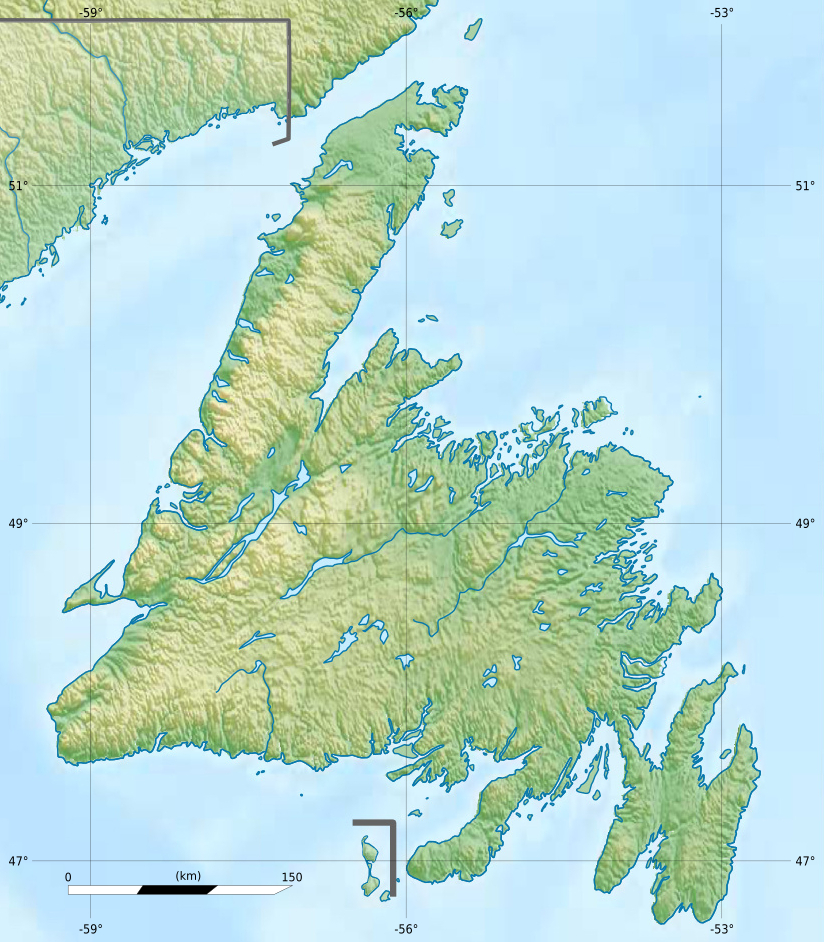
- Location within Newfoundland
- Location: Newfoundland
- Coordinates: 48°19′18″N 57°20′41″W
- Basin countries: Canada

Victoria Lake is a lake located in the west-central interior of the island of Newfoundland in the province of Newfoundland and Labrador, Canada.

The lake is south-east of Beothuk Lake.

== See also ==
- Royal eponyms in Canada
