= British Harbour, Newfoundland and Labrador =

Coordinates: 48.260°N 53.490°W

Location of British Harbour in Newfoundland and Labrador

British Harbour is an abandoned community in Newfoundland and Labrador.

The British Harbour settlement reached a peak population of 224 in 1901, but had declined to 78 by 1969. It was abandoned as part of the Resettlement Program of the Newfoundland Government. The program attempted to relocate people from settlements with "no great future" to more viable locations throughout Newfoundland and Labrador.

The town of British Harbour first showed up in the census in 1845 but it was first settled well before 1800. Not much remains of the once bustling community today but at the turn of the century British Harbour had 224 residents. After the collapse of the Labrador fishery, the First World War, and the depression of the nineteen thirties, British Harbour's population suffered and the total number of residents had dropped to just 52 by the start of World War II. After the end of the war and Newfoundland's confederation into Canada the Joey Smallwood government encouraged the resettlement of hundreds of outport communities into larger centers, all over the province. In 1968 the town of British Harbour was completely abandoned along with 300 other communities and over 30,000 people.

A song by Terry Kelleher called Eulogy for British Harbour tells about the community of British Harbour being emptied of its population in the 1960s by Resettlement. The song is found on the record Storm Child, originally recorded in 1980 and rereleased on 2011.
