= 1908 Newfoundland general election =

Election in the Dominion of Newfoundland

- November 2, 1908

36 seats of the Newfoundland House of Assembly 19 seats needed for a majority
- Turnout: 73.78% (▲2.61pp)
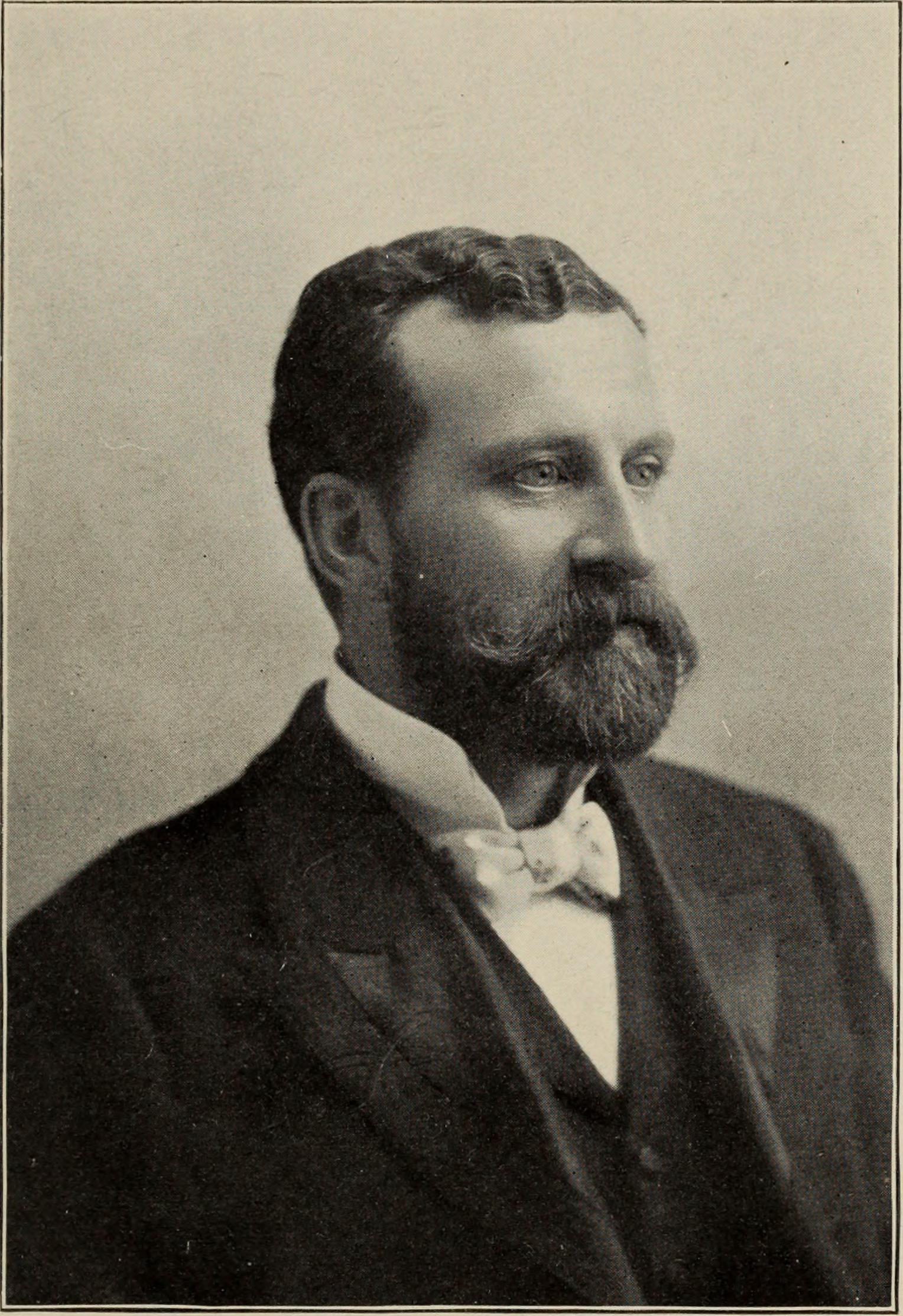

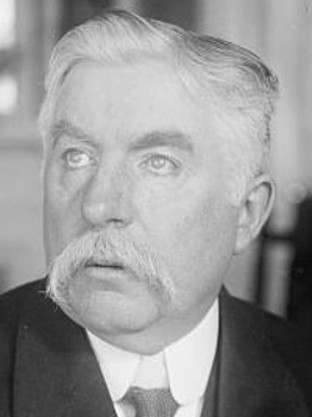
	First party	Second party
Leader	Robert Bond	Edward Morris
Party	Liberal	People's
Leader since	1897	1908
Leader's seat	Twillingate	St. John's West
Last election	30	6 (Note: As the United Opposition Party)
Seats won	18	18
Seat change	▼12	▲12
Popular vote	48,341	47,487
Percentage	50.22%	49.34%
Swing	▼9.80%	▲9.77%
- Results by district
Prime Minister before election
Robert Bond
Liberal
Prime Minister after election
Robert Bond
Liberal

The 1908 Newfoundland general election was held on November 2, 1908 to elect members of the 21st General Assembly of Newfoundland in the Dominion of Newfoundland. The seats were split evenly between the Liberal Party and the new Newfoundland People's Party formed by Edward Morris after he resigned from the Liberal government in 1907 and joined with the opposition. Robert Bond, the Liberal leader, asked the Governor William MacGregor to dissolve the assembly. MacGregor refused to do this and Bond resigned as prime minister. MacGregor then asked Morris to form a government. However, the assembly was not able to elect a speaker and, after MacGregor was unable to convince the two party leaders to form a coalition government, the House of Assembly was dissolved for a new general election on April 9, 1909.

== Results ==
Party	Leader	1904	Candidates	Seats won	Seat change	% of seats (% change)	Popular vote	% of vote (% change)
Liberal	Robert Bond	30	36	18	▼12	50.00% (▼33.33%)	48,341	50.22% (▼9.80%)
People's	Edward Morris	6	36	18	▲12	50.00% (▲33.33%)	47,487	49.34% (▲9.77%)
Other		0	2	0	Steady	0.00%	424	0.44% (▲0.03%)
Totals		36	74	36	Steady	100%	96,252 (Note: This figure includes votes cast for more than one candidate in multi-member districts. A total of 42,082 individual votes were cast in this election.)	100%

== Results by district ==
- Names in **boldface type** represent party leaders.
- † indicates that the incumbent did not run again.
- ‡ indicates that the incumbent ran in a different district.

=== St. John's ===
Electoral district	Candidates		Incumbent
Electoral district	Liberal (historical)	People's	Incumbent
St. John's East; 84.83% turnout	James Kent; 2,755; 21.37%	Michael Gibbs; 1,935; 15.01%	James Kent
St. John's East; 84.83% turnout	George Shea; 2,555; 19.82%	Frank McNamara; 1,598; 12.40%	George Shea
St. John's East; 84.83% turnout	John Dwyer; 2,461; 19.09%	Maurice Devine; 1,588; 12.32%	John Dwyer
St. John's West; 83.37% turnout	George Power; 1,822; 15.89%	**Edward Morris**; 2,274; 19.83%	**Edward Morris**
St. John's West; 83.37% turnout	Andrew Glendenning; 1,604; 13.99%	John R. Bennett; 2,142; 18.68%	John R. Bennett
St. John's West; 83.37% turnout	Edward Carter; 1,575; 13.73%	Michael Kennedy; 2,052; 17.89%	John Scott†

=== Conception Bay ===
Electoral district	Candidates		Incumbent
Electoral district	Liberal (historical)	People's	Incumbent
Bay de Verde; 84.51% turnout	William Penney; 998; 23.54%	John Crosbie; 1,147; 27.06%	William C. Winsor‡ (ran in Bonavista Bay)
Bay de Verde; 84.51% turnout	F. Mews; 992; 23.40%	Jesse Whiteway; 1,102; 26.00%	Charles Hutchings†
Carbonear; 80.73% turnout	Joseph Maddock; 579; 51.01%	John Goodison; 556; 48.99%	Joseph Maddock
Harbour Grace; 76.35% turnout	Eli Dawe; 1,153; 16.55%	Archibald Piccott; 1,206; 17.31%	Eli Dawe
Harbour Grace; 76.35% turnout	Arthur Barnes; 1,129; 16.20%	Edward Parsons; 1,200; 17.22%	William Oke
Harbour Grace; 76.35% turnout	William Oke; 1,129; 16.20%	Alfred Seymour; 1,150; 16.51%	Arthur Barnes
Harbour Main; 69.06% turnout	John Lewis; 862; 25.44%	William Woodford; 948; 27.98%	Frank Morris‡ (ran in Placentia and St. Mary's)
Harbour Main; 69.06% turnout	Patrick Summers; 702; 20.72%	John J. Murphy; 876; 25.86%	John Lewis
Port de Grave; 69.58% turnout	William Lloyd; 581; 42.85%	William Warren; 775; 57.15%	Vacant (Note: Charles Dawe had been elected in a 1906 by-election, but he died while in office on March 29, 1908.)

=== Avalon Peninsula ===
Electoral district	Candidates			Incumbent
Electoral district	Liberal (historical)	People's	Other	Incumbent
Ferryland; 89.12% turnout	William Ellis; 639; 27.00%	Michael Cashin; 916; 38.70%	Michael Condon (Independent); 298; 12.59%	Michael Cashin
Ferryland; 89.12% turnout	R. J. Moore; 225; 9.51%	Philip Moore; 587; 24.80%	Michael Condon (Independent); 298; 12.59%	William Ellis
Placentia and St. Mary's; 78.38% turnout	Edward Jackman; 1,846; 19.94%	Richard Devereaux; 1,343; 14.55%		Edward Jackman
Placentia and St. Mary's; 78.38% turnout	Michael Sullivan; 1,724; 18.67%	William Howley; 1,341; 14.52%		Thomas Bonia†
Placentia and St. Mary's; 78.38% turnout	James Davis; 1,653; 17.90%	Frank Morris; 1,326; 14.36%		Michael Sullivan

=== Eastern Newfoundland ===
Electoral district	Candidates		Incumbent
Electoral district	Liberal (historical)	People's	Incumbent
Bonavista Bay; 61.47% turnout	Edward Bishop; 1,013; 9.81%	Sydney Blandford; 2,624; 25.40%	Donald Morison
Bonavista Bay; 61.47% turnout	James Blackwood; 923; 8.93%	William C. Winsor; 2,524; 24.43%	Mark Chaplin†
Bonavista Bay; 61.47% turnout	Philip Knowling; 808; 7.82%	Donald Morison; 2,439; 23.61%	Sydney Blandford
Trinity Bay; 71.06% turnout	George Gushue; 2,007; 18.32%	Robert Watson; 1,832; 16.72%	George Gushue
Trinity Bay; 71.06% turnout	Arthur Miller; 1,882; 17.18%	Richard Squires; 1,827; 16.67%	William Lloyd‡ (ran in Port de Grave)
Trinity Bay; 71.06% turnout	George Ayre; 1,690; 15.42%	Aaron Stone; 1,719; 15.69%	Arthur Miller

=== Central Newfoundland ===
Electoral district	Candidates		Incumbent
Electoral district	Liberal (historical)	People's	Incumbent
Fogo; 65.73% turnout	Henry Earle; 757; 55.13%	Henry Fitzgerald; 616; 44.87%	Henry Earle
Twillingate; 69.48% turnout	**Robert Bond**; 2,639; 25.30%	Alan Goodridge; 1,176; 11.28%	**Robert Bond**
Twillingate; 69.48% turnout	James Clift; 2,550; 24.45%	Jordan Milley; 975; 9.35%	James Clift
Twillingate; 69.48% turnout	George Roberts; 2,290; 21.96%	Sydney Woods; 800; 7.67%	George Roberts

=== Southern and Western Newfoundland ===
Electoral district	Candidates			Incumbent
Electoral district	Liberal (historical)	People's	Other	Incumbent
Burgeo and LaPoile; 73.06% turnout	A. J. W. McNeilly; 566; 41.74%	Robert Moulton; 790; 58.26%		Robert Moulton
Burin; 71.46% turnout	Edward Davey; 930; 27.34%	John A. Robinson; 802; 23.57%		Edward Davey
Burin; 71.46% turnout	Henry Gear; 896; 26.34%	Thomas LeFeuvre; 774; 22.75%		Henry Gear
Fortune Bay; 68.10% turnout	Andrew Carnell; 758; 46.96%	Charles Emerson; 856; 53.04%		Albert Martin†
St. Barbe; 69.80% turnout	William Clapp; 972; 59.30%	Henry Mott; 667; 40.70%		William Clapp
St. George's; 68.47% turnout	Michael Abbott; 676; 37.43%	Joseph Downey; 1,004; 55.59%	James Hayes (Independent); 126; 6.98%	George Carty†
