= 1909 Newfoundland general election =

Election in the Dominion of Newfoundland

- May 8, 1909

36 seats of the Newfoundland House of Assembly 19 seats needed for a majority
- Turnout: 77.81% (▲4.03pp)
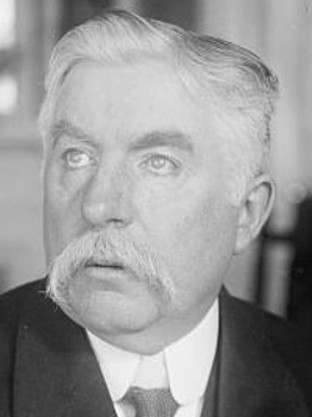

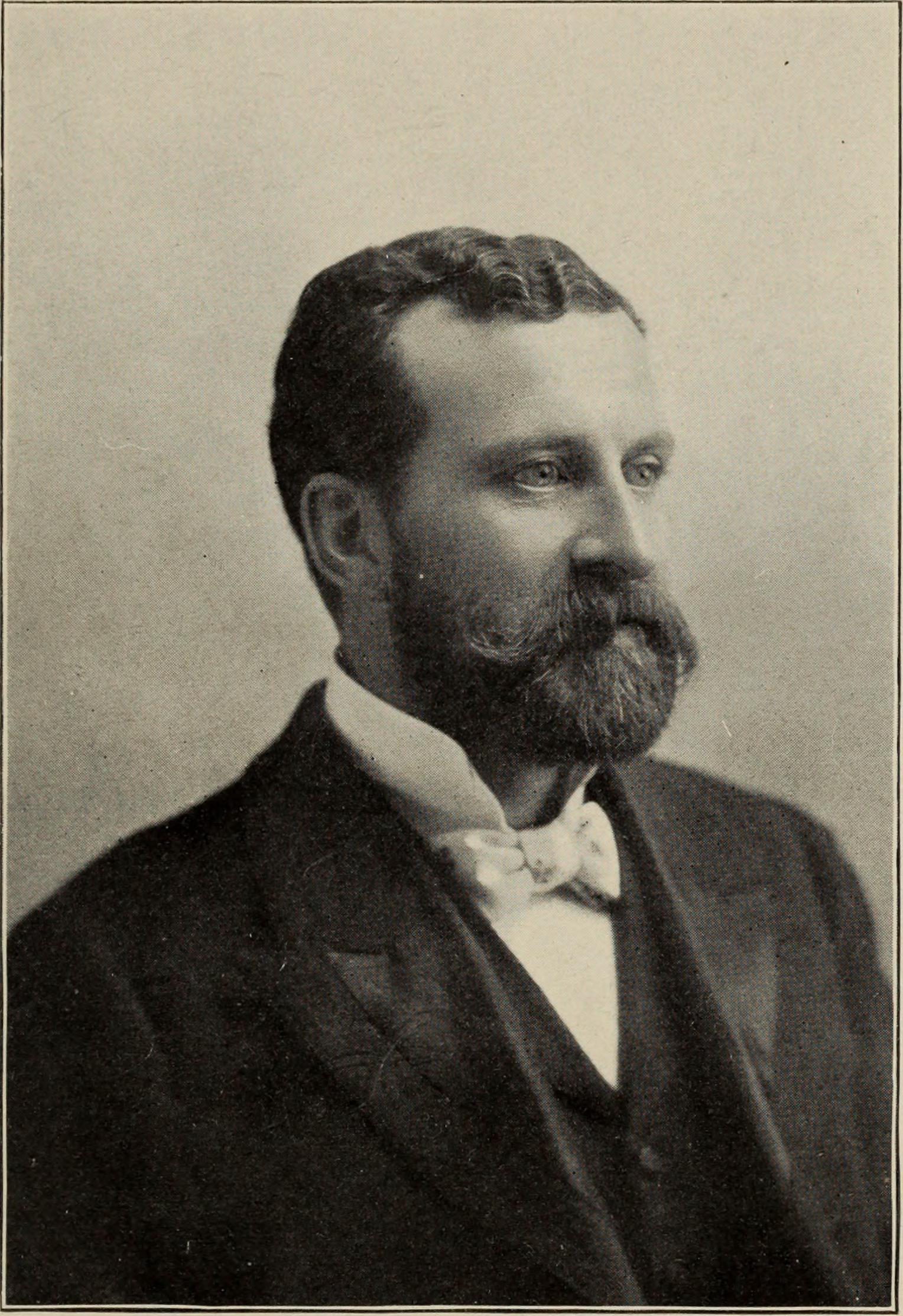
	First party	Second party
Leader	Edward Morris	Robert Bond
Party	People's	Liberal
Leader since	1908	1897
Leader's seat	St. John's West	Twillingate
Last election	18	18
Seats won	26	10
Seat change	▲8	▼8
Popular vote	54,111	48,200
Percentage	52.89%	47.11%
Swing	▲3.55%	▼3.11%
- Results by district
Prime Minister before election
Edward Morris
People's
Prime Minister after election
Edward Morris
People's

The 1909 Newfoundland general election was held on May 8, 1909 to elect members of the 22nd General Assembly of Newfoundland in the Dominion of Newfoundland. The Newfoundland People's Party led by Edward P. Morris, having secured a majority, formed the government.

== Results ==
Party	Leader	1908	Candidates	Seats won	Seat change	% of seats (% change)	Popular vote	% of vote (% change)
People's	Edward Morris	18	36	26	▲8	72.22% (▲22.22%)	54,111	52.89% (▲3.55%)
Liberal	Robert Bond	18	36	10	▼8	27.78% (▼22.22%)	48,200	47.11% (▼3.11%)
Totals		36	72	36	Steady	100%	102,311 (Note: This figure includes votes cast for more than one candidate in multi-member districts. A total of 44,384 individual votes were cast in this election.)	100%

== Results by district ==
- Names in **boldface type** represent party leaders.
- † indicates that the incumbent did not run again.
- ‡ indicates that the incumbent ran in a different district.

=== St. John's ===
Electoral district	Candidates		Incumbent
Electoral district	Liberal (historical)	People's	Incumbent
St. John's East; 84.46% turnout	James Kent; 2,595; 20.05%	Michael Gibbs; 1,979; 15.29%	James Kent
St. John's East; 84.46% turnout	George Shea; 2,471; 19.09%	Frank McNamara; 1,741; 13.45%	George Shea
St. John's East; 84.46% turnout	John Dwyer; 2,457; 18.98%	Maurice Devine; 1,702; 13.15%	John Dwyer
St. John's West; 83.92% turnout	William Ellis; 1,858; 16.05%	**Edward Morris**; 2,205; 19.05%	**Edward Morris**
St. John's West; 83.92% turnout	Henry Cowan; 1,762; 15.22%	John R. Bennett; 2,094; 18.09%	John R. Bennett
St. John's West; 83.92% turnout	John Scott; 1,663; 14.36%	Michael Kennedy; 1,995; 17.23%	Michael Kennedy

=== Conception Bay ===
Electoral district	Candidates		Incumbent
Electoral district	Liberal (historical)	People's	Incumbent
Bay de Verde; 85.96% turnout	Robert Duff; 1,044; 24.00%	John Crosbie; 1,145; 26.32%	John Crosbie
Bay de Verde; 85.96% turnout	Charles Steer; 1,035; 23.79%	Jesse Whiteway; 1,126; 25.89%	Jesse Whiteway
Carbonear; 82.65% turnout	Joseph Maddock; 559; 48.11%	John Goodison; 603; 51.89%	Joseph Maddock
Harbour Grace; 86.24% turnout	John Parsons; 1,223; 15.52%	Archibald Piccott; 1,444; 18.33%	Archibald Piccott
Harbour Grace; 86.24% turnout	Arthur Barnes; 1,210; 15.36%	Alfred Seymour; 1,404; 17.82%	Edward Parsons
Harbour Grace; 86.24% turnout	Eli Dawe; 1,195; 15.17%	Edward Parsons; 1,403; 17.81%	Eli Dawe
Harbour Main; 80.55% turnout	John Lewis; 949; 23.49%	William Woodford; 1,118; 27.67%	William Woodford
Harbour Main; 80.55% turnout	John J. St. John; 908; 22.48%	John J. Murphy; 1,065; 26.36%	John J. Murphy
Port de Grave; 80.94% turnout	Samuel Bartlett; 765; 49.48%	William Warren; 781; 50.52%	William Warren

=== Avalon Peninsula ===
Electoral district	Candidates		Incumbent
Electoral district	Liberal (historical)	People's	Incumbent
Ferryland; 92.85% turnout	George Power; 617; 21.75%	Michael Cashin; 881; 31.05%	Michael Cashin
Ferryland; 92.85% turnout	Michael Condon; 537; 18.93%	Philip Moore; 802; 28.27%	William Ellis‡ (ran in St. John's West)
Placentia and St. Mary's; 83.50% turnout	Edward Jackman; 1,593; 16.12%	Richard Devereaux; 1,791; 18.12%	Edward Jackman
Placentia and St. Mary's; 83.50% turnout	Michael Sullivan; 1,528; 15.46%	William Howley; 1,767; 17.88%	Michael Sullivan
Placentia and St. Mary's; 83.50% turnout	James Davis; 1,461; 14.78%	Frank Morris; 1,743; 17.64%	James Davis

=== Eastern Newfoundland ===
Electoral district	Candidates		Incumbent
Electoral district	Liberal (historical)	People's	Incumbent
Bonavista Bay; 65.73% turnout	John Giles; 652; 5.79%	Sydney Blandford; 3,158; 28.02%	Sydney Blandford
Bonavista Bay; 65.73% turnout	Ambrose Janes; 636; 5.64%	William C. Winsor; 3,133; 27.80%	William C. Winsor
Bonavista Bay; 65.73% turnout	Arthur Herder; 615; 5.46%	Donald Morison; 3,076; 27.29%	Donald Morison
Trinity Bay; 83.20% turnout	George Gushue; 2,082; 16.71%	Richard Squires; 2,182; 17.51%	George Gushue
Trinity Bay; 83.20% turnout	Arthur Miller; 2,014; 16.16%	Robert Watson; 2,176; 17.46%	Arthur Miller
Trinity Bay; 83.20% turnout	George Ayre; 1,905; 15.29%	Edwin Grant; 2,104; 16.88%	Robert Watson

=== Central Newfoundland ===
Electoral district	Candidates		Incumbent
Electoral district	Liberal (historical)	People's	Incumbent
Fogo; 81.67% turnout	Henry Earle; 861; 50.45%	Henry Fitzgerald; 845; 49.53%	Henry Earle
Twillingate; 74.94% turnout	**Robert Bond**; 2,621; 23.19%	Alan Goodridge; 1,297; 11.48%	**Robert Bond**
Twillingate; 74.94% turnout	James A. Clift; 2,592; 22.93%	Jordan Milley; 1,204; 10.65%	James Clift
Twillingate; 74.94% turnout	George Roberts; 2,498; 22.10%	Sydney Woods; 1,090; 9.64%	George Roberts

=== Southern and Western Newfoundland ===
Electoral district	Candidates		Incumbent
Electoral district	Liberal (historical)	People's	Incumbent
Burgeo and LaPoile; 69.40% turnout	A. J. W. McNeilly; 467; 36.26%	Robert Moulton; 821; 63.74%	Robert Moulton
Burin; 64.82% turnout	Henry Gear; 795; 25.38%	John A. Robinson; 781; 24.94%	Edward Davey
Burin; 64.82% turnout	Edward Davey; 782; 24.97%	Thomas LeFeuvre; 774; 24.71%	Henry Gear
Fortune Bay; 56.43% turnout	William Lloyd; 608; 45.41%	Charles Emerson; 731; 54.59%	Charles Emerson
St. Barbe; 72.35% turnout	William Clapp; 911; 53.56%	Henry Mott; 790; 46.44%	William Clapp
St. George's; 72.47% turnout	George Carty; 731; 38.66%	Joseph Downey; 1,160; 61.34%	Joseph Downey
