= 22nd General Assembly of Newfoundland =

Dominion of Newfoundland legislature

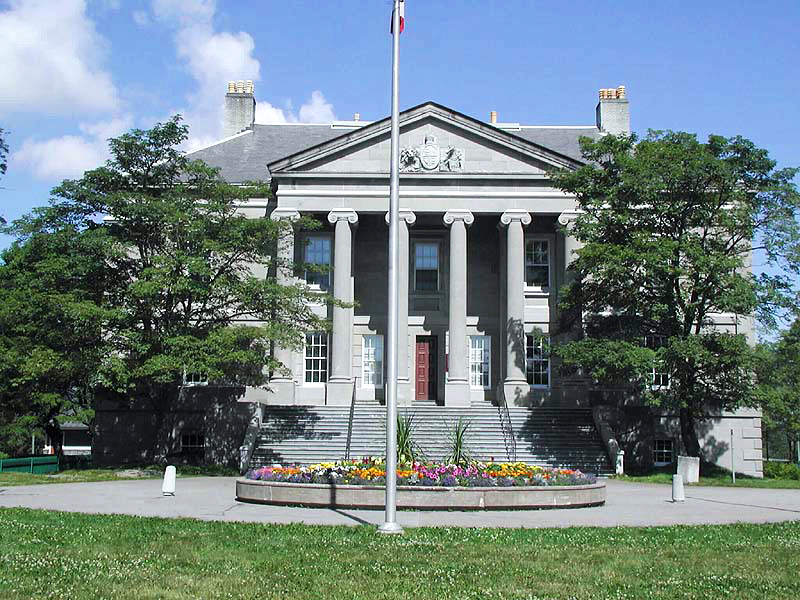
- Colonial Building seat of the Newfoundland government and the House of Assembly from January 28, 1850, to July 28, 1959.

History
- Founded: 1909
- Disbanded: 1913
- Preceded by: 21st General Assembly of Newfoundland
- Succeeded by: 23rd General Assembly of Newfoundland

Leadership
- Premier: Edward P. Morris

Elections
- Last election: 1909 Newfoundland general election

The members of the 22nd General Assembly of Newfoundland were elected in the Newfoundland general election held in May 1909. The general assembly sat from 1909 to 1913.

The Newfoundland People's Party led by Edward P. Morris formed the government.

Francis J. Morris served as speaker until 1910 when William Warren succeeded Morris as speaker.

Sir Ralph Champneys Williams served as governor of Newfoundland.

== Members of the Assembly ==
The following members were elected to the assembly in 1909:

Member	Electoral district	Affiliation	First elected / previously elected
John Crosbie	Bay de Verde	People's Party	1908
Jesse Whiteway	Bay de Verde	People's Party	1908
Sydney Blandford	Bonavista	People's Party	1908
William C. Winsor	Bonavista	People's Party	1904
Donald Morison	Bonavista	People's Party	1888, 1906
Robert Moulton	Burgeo-La Poile	People's Party	1904
Henry Gear	Burin	Liberal	1900
Edward H. Davey	Burin	Liberal	1900
Thomas LeFeuvre (1911)	Burin	People's Party	1911
John R. Goodison	Carbonear	People's Party	1909
Michael P. Cashin	Ferryland	People's Party	1893
Philip F. Moore	Ferryland	People's Party	1909
Henry Earle	Fogo	Liberal	1904
Charles Emerson	Fortune Bay	People's Party	1908
A. W. Piccott	Harbour Grace	People's Party	1908
A. H. Seymour	Harbour Grace	People's Party	1909
E. Parsons	Harbour Grace	People's Party	1908
William Woodford	Harbour Main	People's Party	1908
J.J. Murphy	Harbour Main	People's Party	1908
R. J. Devereaux	Placentia and St. Mary's	People's Party	1909
William R. Howley	Placentia and St. Mary's	People's Party	1900, 1909
Frank J. Morris	Placentia and St. Mary's	People's Party	1889, 1900, 1909
William R. Warren	Port de Grave	People's Party	1908
William M. Clapp	St. Barbe	Liberal	1904
Joseph Downey	St. George's	People's Party	1908
James M. Kent	St. John's East	Liberal	1904
George Shea	St. John's East	Liberal	1885, 1904
John Dwyer	St. John's East	Liberal	1900
Edward P. Morris	St. John's West	People's Party	1885
John R. Bennett	St. John's West	People's Party	1904
Michael Kennedy	St. John's West	People's Party	1908
Richard Squires	Trinity	People's Party	1909
Robert Watson	Trinity	People's Party	1897, 1902, 1908
E.G. Grant	Trinity	People's Party	1909
Robert Bond	Twillingate	Liberal	1882
James A. Clift	Twillingate	Liberal	1900
George Roberts	Twillingate	Liberal	1900

== By-elections ==
By-elections were held to replace members for various reasons:

Electoral district	Member elected	Affiliation	Election date	Reason
Burin	Thomas LeFeuvre (Note: Acclaimed)	People's Party	November 27, 1911	E H Davey died March 10, 1911
