= 21st General Assembly of Newfoundland =

Dominion of Newfoundland legislature

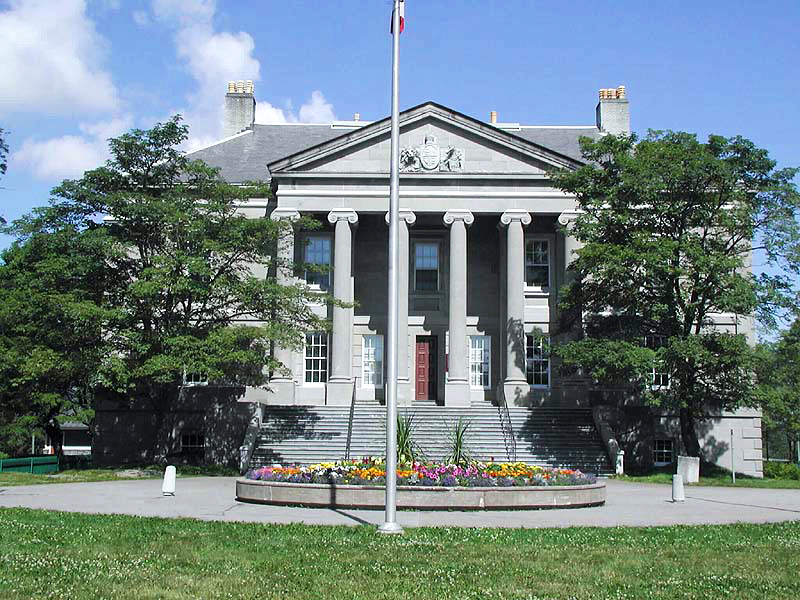
- Colonial Building seat of the Newfoundland government and the House of Assembly from January 28, 1850, to July 28, 1959.

History
- Founded: 1908
- Disbanded: 1909
- Preceded by: 20th General Assembly of Newfoundland
- Succeeded by: 22nd General Assembly of Newfoundland

Leadership
- Premier: Edward P. Morris

Elections
- Last election: 1908 Newfoundland general election

The members of the 21st General Assembly of Newfoundland were elected in the Newfoundland general election held in November 1908. The general assembly sat from March 30 to April 9, 1909.

The seats were split evenly between the Liberal Party and the new Newfoundland People's Party. Robert Bond resigned as premier after the Governor refused to dissolve the assembly. Edward P. Morris of the People's Party was asked to form a government but the assembly was unable to choose a speaker and was dissolved.

Although Morris was not able to form a stable government, as Premier, he was able to spend money which helped him gain votes for the election that was to follow.

Sir William MacGregor served as governor of Newfoundland.

== Members of the Assembly ==
The following members were elected to the assembly in 1908:

Member	Electoral district	Affiliation	First elected / previously elected
John Crosbie	Bay de Verde	People's Party	1908
Jesse Whiteway	Bay de Verde	People's Party	1908
Sydney Blandford	Bonavista	People's Party	1904
William C. Winsor	Bonavista	People's Party	1904
Donald Morison	Bonavista	People's Party	1888, 1906
Robert Moulton	Burgeo-La Poile	People's Party	1904
Edward H. Davey	Burin	Liberal	1900
Henry Gear	Burin	Liberal	1900
Joseph Maddock	Carbonear	Liberal	1900
Michael P. Cashin	Ferryland	People's Party	1893
William J. Ellis	Ferryland	Liberal	1904
Henry Earle	Fogo	Liberal	1904
Charles Emerson	Fortune Bay	People's Party	1900, 1908
A. W. Piccott	Harbour Grace	People's Party	1908
E. Parsons	Harbour Grace	People's Party	1908
Eli Dawe	Harbour Grace	Liberal	1889
William Woodford	Harbour Main	People's Party	1889, 1908
J.J. Murphy	Harbour Main	People's Party	1908
E. M. Jackman	Placentia and St. Mary's	Liberal	1900
Michael S. Sullivan	Placentia and St. Mary's	Liberal	1904
J. Davis	Placentia and St. Mary's	Liberal	1908
William R. Warren	Port de Grave	People's Party	1902, (Note: Trinity) 1908
William M. Clapp	St. Barbe	Liberal	1904
Joseph Downey	St. George's	People's Party	1908
James M. Kent	St. John's East	Liberal	1904
George Shea	St. John's East	Liberal	1885, 1904
John Dwyer	St. John's East	Liberal	1900
Edward P. Morris	St. John's West	People's Party	1885
John R. Bennett	St. John's West	People's Party	1904
Michael Kennedy	St. John's West	People's Party	1908
George W. Gushue	Trinity	Liberal	1900
A. W. Miller	Trinity	Liberal	1904
Robert Watson	Trinity	People's Party	1897, 1902, 1908
Robert Bond	Twillingate	Liberal	1882
James A. Clift	Twillingate	Liberal	1900
George Roberts	Twillingate	Liberal	1900

== By-elections ==
None.
