= 20th General Assembly of Newfoundland =

Colony of Newfoundland legislature; Dominion of Newfoundland from 1907 onward

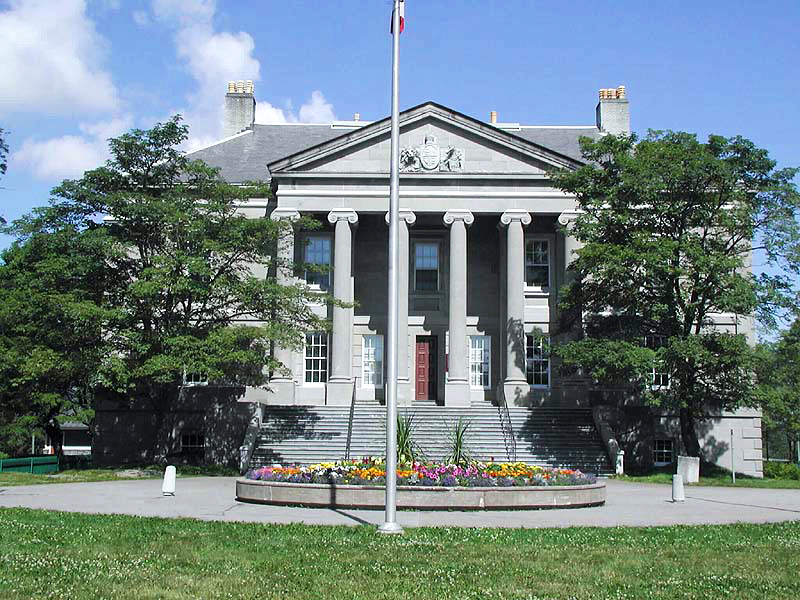
- Colonial Building seat of the Newfoundland government and the House of Assembly from January 28, 1850, to July 28, 1959.

History
- Founded: 1905
- Disbanded: 1908
- Preceded by: 19th General Assembly of Newfoundland
- Succeeded by: 21st General Assembly of Newfoundland

Leadership
- Premier: Robert Bond

Elections
- Last election: 1904 Newfoundland general election

The members of the 20th General Assembly of Newfoundland were elected in the Newfoundland general election held in October 1904. The general assembly sat from 1905 to 1908.

The Liberal Party led by Robert Bond formed the government.

Francis J. Morris was chosen as speaker.

Sir William MacGregor served as colonial governor of Newfoundland until 1907 when Newfoundland became a dominion and continued to serve as governor for the dominion until 1909.

== Members of the Assembly ==
The following members were elected to the assembly in 1904:

Member	Electoral district	Affiliation	First elected / previously elected
William C. Winsor	Bay de Verde	Conservative	1904
Charles H. Hutchings	Bay de Verde	Liberal	1904
Alfred B. Morine	Bonavista	Conservative	1886
Mark Chaplin	Bonavista	Conservative	1900
Sydney Blandford	Bonavista	Conservative	1904
Donald Morison (1906)	Bonavista	Conservative	1888, 1906
Robert Moulton	Burgeo-La Poile	Conservative	1904
Edward H. Davey	Burin	Liberal	1900
Henry Gear	Burin	Liberal	1900
John Maddock	Carbonear	Liberal	1900
Michael P. Cashin	Ferryland	Liberal	1893
William J. Ellis	Ferryland	Liberal	1904
Henry Earle	Fogo	Liberal	1900
Albert H. Martin	Fortune Bay	Liberal	1904
Eli Dawe	Harbour Grace	Liberal	1889
William A. Oke	Harbour Grace	Liberal	1897
Arthur Barnes	Harbour Grace	Liberal	1904
Frank J. Morris	Harbour Main	Liberal	1900
John Lewis	Harbour Main	Liberal	1904
E. M. Jackman	Placentia and St. Mary's	Liberal	1900
Thomas Bonia	Placentia and St. Mary's	Liberal	1900
Michael S. Sullivan	Placentia and St. Mary's	Liberal	1904
Alexander McKay	Port de Grave	Conservative	1878, 1900
Charles Dawe (1906)	Port de Grave	Conservative	1878, 1893, 1906
William M. Clapp	St. Barbe	Liberal	1904
George T. Carty	St. George's	Liberal	1904
James M. Kent	St. John's East	Liberal	1904
George Shea	St. John's East	Liberal	1885, 1904
John Dwyer	St. John's East	Liberal	1900
Edward Morris	St. John's West	Liberal	1885
John R. Bennett	St. John's West	Liberal	1904
John Scott	St. John's West	Liberal	1900
George W. Gushue	Trinity	Liberal	1894, 1900
William F. Lloyd	Trinity	Liberal	1904
A. W. Miller	Trinity	Liberal	1904
Robert Bond	Twillingate	Liberal	1882
James A. Clift	Twillingate	Liberal	1889, 1900
George Roberts	Twillingate	Liberal	1900

== By-elections ==
By-elections were held to replace members for various reasons:

Electoral district	Member elected	Affiliation	Election date	Reason
Port de Grave	Charles Dawe	Conservative	February 1, 1906	A MacKay died November 24, 1905
Bonavista	Donald Morison (Note: Acclaimed)	Conservative	November 6, 1906	AB Morine resigned seat in 1906 and moved to Ontario
