= List of premiers of Newfoundland and Labrador =

Flag of Newfoundland and Labrador

The premier of Newfoundland and Labrador is the current title of the first minister for the Canadian province of Newfoundland and Labrador, which was at certain points in its was history a colony and dominion. Newfoundland had a system of responsible government from 1855 to 1934, and again since 1949. Originally becoming a British crown colony in 1855, it would transition to a Dominion in 1907, and since 1949, a province of Canada. Since then, the province has been a part of the Canadian federation and has kept its own legislature to deal with provincial matters. The province was named Newfoundland and Labrador on December 6, 2001.

The province has a unicameral Westminster-style parliamentary government, in which the premier is the leader of the party that controls the most seats in the House of Assembly. The premier is Newfoundland and Labrador's head of government, and the king of Canada is its head of state and is represented by the lieutenant governor of Newfoundland and Labrador. The premier picks a cabinet from the elected members to form the Executive Council of Newfoundland and Labrador, and presides over that body. Members are first elected to the House during general elections. General elections must be conducted every four years from the date of the last election. An election may also take place if the governing party loses the confidence of the legislature by the defeat of a supply bill or tabling of a confidence motion.

From 1855 to 1907, the position of first minister was known as premier. After the colony was granted dominion status, the position became known as prime minister. Democratic government was suspended in 1934 and replaced by an appointed Commission of Government, until 1949 Newfoundland became a province of Canada. Since the reinstitution of democratic government in 1949, the title of first minister has been premier.

Since 1855, Newfoundland and Labrador has been led by ten Colonial premiers, nine Dominion prime ministers, three chairmen of Commission of Government, and sixteen provincial premiers. Of the provincial premiers, eight are from the Liberal Party, and eight are from the Progressive Conservative Party.

== Colonial Premiers of Newfoundland (1855–1907) ==
No.	Portrait	Name (Birth–Death)	Term of office	Electoral mandates (Assembly)	Political party	Parliamentary seat	Ref.
1		Philip Francis Little (1824–1897)	7 May 1855 – 16 July 1858	1855 election (6th Leg.)	Liberal	MHA for St. John's	
1		Philip Francis Little (1824–1897)	First premier as colony achieves responsible government.				
2		John Kent (1805–1872)	16 July 1858 – c. March; 1861	Appointment (6th Leg.) 1859 election (7th Leg.)	Liberal	MHA for St. John's East	
2		John Kent (1805–1872)	Largely supported by Catholics, Kent was dismissed by the governor after accusing him of conspiring against the government. The subsequent election was fought on sectarian lines; rioting broke out when the governor cancelled voting in the Catholic town of Harbour Grace thus denying Kent two seats needed to prevent a Conservative majority.				
3		Sir Hugh Hoyles (1814–1888)	c. March; 1861 – 4 March 1865	Appointment (7th Leg.) 1861 election (8th Leg.)	Conservative	MHA for Burin	
3		Sir Hugh Hoyles (1814–1888)	Appointed by the governor after his predecessor's dismissal, Hoyles narrowly won the subsequent election. Government tried to reduce sectarian tensions by inviting Catholics into his cabinet and including them in patronage appointments.				
4 (1 of 2)		Sir Frederick Carter (1819–1900)	c. March; 1865 – 11 February 1870	Appointment (8th Leg.) 1865 election (9th Leg.)	Conservative	MHA for Burin	
4 (1 of 2)		Sir Frederick Carter (1819–1900)	Proposed confederation with Canada but was defeated by Anti-Confederate opposition in 1869.				
5		Charles Fox Bennett (1793–1883)	14 February 1870 – 30 January 1874	1869 election (10th Leg.) 1873 election (11th Leg.)	Anti-Confederation	MHA for Placentia—St. Mary's	
5		Charles Fox Bennett (1793–1883)	Opposed confederation with Canada; abolished mining royalties; increased geological survey grant and funds for roads and public works; improved coastal steamship service and instituted direct shipping service to England; reorganized Newfoundland Constabulary to take over policing duties after British garrison withdrawn; acquiesced to US fishing rights in Treaty of Washington (1871); began a lead mine at Port au Port, challenging France's rights to the French Shore, but was forced to close by UK government.				
4 (2 of 2)		Sir Frederick Carter (1819–1900)	30 January 1874 – c. April; 1878	Appointment (11th Leg.) 1874 election (12th Leg.)	Conservative	MHA for Twillingate—Fogo	
4 (2 of 2)		Sir Frederick Carter (1819–1900)	Created publicly funded denominational school system				
6 (1 of 3)		Sir William Whiteway (1828–1908)	c. April; 1878 – c. October; 1885	Appointment (12th Leg.) 1878 election (13th Leg.) 1882 election (14th Leg.)	Conservative	MHA for Trinity Bay	
6 (1 of 3)		Sir William Whiteway (1828–1908)	Non-sectarian government including Catholics and Protestants; Proposed and arranged financing for construction of the transinsular railway in order to develop and diversify the economy; government collapsed following sectarian riots in Harbour Grace when several Protestant ministers quit to protest government's conciliatory attitude towards Catholics.				
7		Sir Robert Thorburn (1836–1906)	12 October 1885 – c. 1889	1885 election (15th Leg.)	Reform	MHA for Trinity Bay	
7		Sir Robert Thorburn (1836–1906)	Rejected preceding government's railway plan in order to focus on developing fishery based economy; belatedly attempted to invest in public works when fishery downturn caused economic stagnation. Represented Newfoundland at the First Colonial Conference in London.				
6 (2 of 3)		Sir William Whiteway (1828–1908)	c. December; 1889 – 11 April 1894	1889 election (16th Leg.) 1893 election (17th Leg.)	Liberal	MHA for Trinity Bay	
6 (2 of 3)		Sir William Whiteway (1828–1908)	Continued development of the railway; government lost power due to corruption scandal.				
8		Augustus F. Goodridge (1839–1920)	c. April; 1894 – c. December; 1894	Appointment (17th Leg.)	Tory	MHA for Twillingate	
9		Daniel Joseph Greene (1850–1911)	13 December 1894 – 8 February 1895	Appointment (17th Leg.)	Liberal	MHA for Ferryland	
9		Daniel Joseph Greene (1850–1911)	Passed the Disabilities Removal Act which allowed disqualified candidates from the 1893 election to run again in election. This notably allowed Sir William Whiteway to return to the premiership.				
6 (3 of 3)		Sir William Whiteway (1828–1908)	8 February 1895 – c. 1897	Appointment (17th Leg.)	Liberal	MHA for Trinity Bay	
6 (3 of 3)		Sir William Whiteway (1828–1908)	Failed negotiations with Canada to enter confederation. Represented Newfoundland at the 1897 Colonial Conference in London.				
10		Sir James Spearman Winter (1845–1911)	c. 1897 – 5 March 1900	1897 election (18th Leg.)	Tory	MHA for Burin	
11		Sir Robert Bond (1857–1927)	15 March 1900 – 25 September 1907	Appointment (18th Leg.) 1900 election (19th Leg.) 1904 election (20th Leg.)	Liberal	MHA for Twillingate	
11		Sir Robert Bond (1857–1927)	Settlement of French Shore territorial dispute giving Newfoundland undisputed control of the island; failed attempt to negotiate free trade with the United States. Represented Newfoundland at the 1902 Colonial Conference and then at the 1907 Imperial Conference, where it was agreed that Newfoundland and other self-governing colonies would be given dominion status.				

== Dominion Prime Ministers of Newfoundland (1907–1934) ==
By Royal Proclamation, the colony was granted dominion status on 26 September 1907 becoming the Dominion of Newfoundland with its head of government being given the title Prime Minister of the Dominion of Newfoundland.

No.	Portrait	Name (Birth–Death)	Term of office	Electoral mandates (Assembly)	Political party	Parliamentary seat	Ref.
1		Sir Robert Bond (1857–1927)	26 September 1907 – 2 March 1909	Title created (20th Leg.) 1908 election (21st Leg.)	Liberal	MHA for Twillingate	
2		Sir Edward Patrick Morris (1859–1935)	2 March 1909 – 31 December 1917	Appointment (21st Leg.) 1909 election (22nd Leg.) 1913 election (23rd Leg.)	People's	MHA for St. John's West	
2		Sir Edward Patrick Morris (1859–1935)	Expansion of the transinsular railway; allowed speculators to buy timber rights on Crown land. Second term was dominated by the war, introduced income tax and formed a wartime national government. Represented Newfoundland at the 1911 Imperial Conference and the Imperial War Conference. Upon retirement became first and only Newfoundland born person to be raised to the peerage.				
3		Sir John Crosbie (1876–1932)	31 December 1917 – 5 January 1918	Appointment (23rd Leg.)	People's	MHA for Bay de Verde	
3		Sir John Crosbie (1876–1932)	Caretaker prime minister.				
4		Sir William F. Lloyd (1864–1937)	5 January 1918 – 20 May 1919	Appointment (23rd Leg.)	Liberal Reform	MHA for Trinity Bay	
4		Sir William F. Lloyd (1864–1937)	Introduced conscription for the Newfoundland Regiment; led coalition government through the conclusion of the war.				
5		Sir Michael Patrick Cashin (1864–1926)	22 May 1919 – 17 November 1919	Appointment (23rd Leg.)	People's	MHA for Ferryland	
6 (1 of 2)		Richard Squires (1880–1940)	17 November 1919 – 23 July 1923	Appointment (23rd Leg.) 1919 election (24th Leg.) 1923 election (25th Leg.)	Liberal Reform	MHA for St. John's West	
6 (1 of 2)		Richard Squires (1880–1940)	Attempted to diversify the economy and to reform the fisheries; nationalized the financially struggling transinsular railway; government fell due to a bribery scandal.				
7		William Warren (1879–1927)	24 July 1923 – 7 May 1924	Appointment (25th Leg.)	Liberal Reform	MHA for Fortune Bay	
8		Albert Hickman (1875–1943)	10 May 1924 – 9 June 1924	Appointment (caretaker government)	Liberal-Progressive	Did not hold a seat in legislature	
8		Albert Hickman (1875–1943)	Joined with some members of former Liberal Reform Party and some members of other parties to form a Liberal-Progressive government				
9		Walter Stanley Monroe (1871–1952)	9 June 1924 – 15 August 1928	1924 election (26th Leg.)	Liberal–Conservative	MHA for Bonavista	
9		Walter Stanley Monroe (1871–1952)	Women's right to vote and hold office achieved; settlement of the Labrador boundary dispute with Canada after Newfoundland successfully argued its case at the Judicial Committee of the Privy Council in London.				
10 (1 of 2)		Frederick C. Alderdice (1872–1936)	15 August 1928 – 17 November 1928	Appointment (26th Leg.)	Liberal–Conservative	Councillor for dominion-at-large	
— (2 of 2)		Richard Squires (1880–1940)	17 November 1928 – 11 June 1932	1928 election (27th Leg.)	Liberal	MHA for Humber	
— (2 of 2)		Richard Squires (1880–1940)	Attempted to govern during the Great Depression which saw a collapse of fish prices and widespread unemployment; Newfoundland requested to join Confederation in exchange for a bailout but was rejected by Canada; economic instability and allegations of corruption inflamed public opinion resulting in a riot and the fall of the government.				
— (2 of 2)		Frederick C. Alderdice (1872–1936)	11 June 1932 – 16 February 1934	1932 election (28th Leg.)	United Newfoundland	MHA for St. John's West	
— (2 of 2)		Frederick C. Alderdice (1872–1936)	Alderdice's United Newfoundland Party wins election on the promise that it will examine the possibility of suspending the constitution and having a commission administer the country until the financial crisis improves. UK and Canada agree to give the dominion financial aid in exchange for a Royal Commission on the Newfoundland's future. Alderdice accepts the Commission's recommendation to suspend responsible government and replace it with a Commission of Government appointed by London.				

== Chairmen of the Commission of Government (1934–1949) ==
With the suspension of responsible government the dominion was administered by the Commission of Government, from 1934 to 1949. It was a body of seven appointed by the British government, made up of three British officials, three Newfoundlanders, and chaired by the Governor of Newfoundland.

No.	Portrait	Name (Birth–Death) District	Term of office	
1		Admiral Sir David Murray Anderson (1874–1936)	16 February 1934	October; 1935
2		Vice-Admiral Sir Humphrey T. Walwyn (1879–1957)	February; 1936	16 January 1946
3		Gordon MacDonald (1888–1966)	16 January 1946	1 April 1949

== Provincial Premiers of Newfoundland (1949–2001) and Newfoundland and Labrador (2001–present) ==
No.	Portrait	Name (Birth–Death)	Term of office	Electoral mandates (Assembly)	Political party	Parliamentary seat	Ref.
1		Joey Smallwood (1900–1991)	1 April 1949 – 18 January 1972	Title created (caretaker government) 1949 election (29th Leg.) 1951 election (30th Leg.) 1956 election (31st Leg.) 1959 election (32nd Leg.) 1962 election (33rd Leg.) 1966 election (34th Leg.) 1971 election (35th Leg.)	Liberal (Ldr. 1949)	MHA for Bonavista North (1949-1959; 1962-1966) MHA for St. John's West (1959-1962) MHA for Humber West (1966-1971) MHA for Placentia East (1971-1972)	
1		Joey Smallwood (1900–1991)	Led successful campaign for Newfoundland to join Canada; longest serving first minister in Newfoundland history; creation of welfare state; development of hydroelectricity, mining and paper industries; Churchill Falls Generating Station and hydro contract with Quebec.				
2		Frank Moores (1933–2005)	18 January 1972 – 26 March 1979	1972 election (36th Leg.) 1975 election (37th Leg.)	Progressive Conservative (Ldr. 1970)	MHA for Humber West	
2		Frank Moores (1933–2005)	First Progressive Conservative premier; emphasized rural development and resource control.				
3		Brian Peckford (b. 1942)	26 March 1979 – 22 March 1989	Appointment (37th Leg.) 1979 election (38th Leg.) 1982 election (39th Leg.) 1985 election (40th Leg.)	Progressive Conservative (Ldr. 1979)	MHA for Green Bay	
3		Brian Peckford (b. 1942)	Youngest first minister in Newfoundland history; Negotiated first Atlantic Accord with Ottawa to give province greater say in and financial benefit from offshore energy exploitation; Hibernia oil field development; new provincial flag, expansion of high school to grade 12; construction of Trans-Labrador Highway; creation of the Department of the Environment; brought greenhouse cucumbers to the province.				
4		Tom Rideout (b. 1948)	22 March 1989 – 5 May 1989	Appointment (40th Leg.)	Progressive Conservative (Ldr. 1989)	MHA for Baie Verte-Springdale	
5		Clyde Wells (b. 1937)	5 May 1989 – 26 January 1996	1989 election (41st Leg.) 1993 election (42nd Leg.)	Liberal (Ldr. 1987)	MHA for Bay of Islands	
5		Clyde Wells (b. 1937)	Opposed the Meech Lake Accord, negotiated Charlottetown Accord, creation of a public school system replacing two parochial streams, budgetary reform, economic diversification in response to collapse of the Atlantic northwest cod fishery.				
6		Brian Tobin (b. 1954)	26 January 1996 – 16 October 2000	Appointment (42nd Leg.) 1996 election (43rd Leg.) 1999 election (44th Leg.)	Liberal (Ldr. 1996)	MHA for Bay of Islands (1996-1999) MHA for The Straits – White Bay North (1999-2000)	
6		Brian Tobin (b. 1954)	Completed replacement of separate school system with public schools.				
7		Beaton Tulk (1944–2019)	16 October 2000 – 13 February 2001	Appointment (44th Leg.)	Liberal (Ldr. interim)	MHA for Bonavista North	
8		Roger Grimes (b. 1950)	13 February 2001 – 6 November 2003	Appointment (44th Leg.)	Liberal (Ldr. 2001)	MHA for Exploits	
8		Roger Grimes (b. 1950)	Royal Commission on Renewing and Strengthening Our Place in Canada				
9		Danny Williams (b. 1949)	6 November 2003 – 3 December 2010	2003 election (45th Leg.) 2007 election (46th Leg.)	Progressive Conservative (Ldr. 2001)	MHA for Humber West	
9		Danny Williams (b. 1949)	Reorganization of health and education; negotiated Second Atlantic Accord to keep 100% of oil revenues in the province; negotiated deals to develop Hebron offshore oil field and expand Hibernia oil field; opposed sale of New Brunswick Power to Hydro-Québec; further development of Lower Churchill Project and Muskrat Falls with transmission lines to Maritimes and the US.				
10		Kathy Dunderdale (b. 1952)	3 December 2010 – 24 January 2014	Appointment (46th Leg.) 2011 election (47th Leg.)	Progressive Conservative (Ldr. 2011)	MHA for Virginia Waters	
10		Kathy Dunderdale (b. 1952)	Only female premier; school board consolidation; further resource development; sanctioning of Muskrat Falls and negotiation of federal loan guarantee for the project; resigned following criticism of her leadership during a series of power outages and rolling blackouts across the province.				
11		Tom Marshall (b. 1946)	24 January 2014 – 26 September 2014	Appointment (47th Leg.)	Progressive Conservative (Ldr. interim)	MHA for Humber East	
12		Paul Davis (b. 1961)	26 September 2014 – 14 December 2015	Appointment (47th Leg.)	Progressive Conservative (Ldr. 2014)	MHA for Topsail	
12		Paul Davis (b. 1961)	Reduced the number of electoral districts in the province to 40; introduced the Downpayment Assistance Program.				
13		Dwight Ball (b. 1957)	14 December 2015 – 19 August 2020	2015 election (48th Leg.) 2019 election (49th Leg.)	Liberal (Ldr. 2013)	MHA for Humber-Gros Morne	
13		Dwight Ball (b. 1957)	Called a public inquiry into cost overruns of the Muskrat Falls Lower Churchill Project and negotiated with the federal government; enacted unpopular austerity measures to combat mounting provincial debt; re-elected to a minority government in 2019; resigned following criticisms over the awarding of non-competitive contracts and appointments benefiting individuals with links to the Liberal Party.				
14		Andrew Furey (b. 1975)	19 August 2020 – 9 May 2025	Appointment (49th Leg.) 2021 election (50th Leg.)	Liberal (Ldr. 2020)	MHA for Humber-Gros Morne	
14		Andrew Furey (b. 1975)	Was not an MHA until winning the seat left by his predecessor, Dwight Ball; managed the provincial response to the COVID-19 pandemic; appointed the Premier's Economic Recovery Taskforce; re-elected to a majority government in 2021; amalgamation of the four health authorities.				
15		John Hogan (b. 1978)	9 May 2025 – 29 October 2025	Appointment (50th Leg.)	Liberal (Ldr. 2025)	MHA for Windsor Lake	
15		John Hogan (b. 1978)	Won the leadership race within his own party to become Premier; oversaw the response to the 2025 wildfires.				
16		Tony Wakeham (b. 1956)	29 October 2025 – incumbent	2025 election (51st Leg.)	Progressive Conservative (Ldr. 2023)	MHA for Stephenville-Port au Port	
16		Tony Wakeham (b. 1956)	Oversaw the furthering of the Bay Du Nord oil project.				
1.Dunderdale was named interim Progressive Conservative Party leader on 26 November 2010, she was not elected party leader until 2 April 2011.

== By time in office ==
This is a list of premiers of Newfoundland and Labrador, since the jurisdiction joined Canadian Confederation in 1949, in order of time served in office as of November 14, 2026. The preceding premier always stays in office during an election campaign, and that time is included in the total.

Rank	Premier	Incumbency	Dates in power	Mandates	Party
1	Joey Smallwood	22 years, 292 days	1949–1972	7	█ Liberal
2	Brian Peckford	9 years, 330 days	1979–1989	3	█ Progressive Conservative
3	Frank Moores	7 years, 67 days	1972–1979	2	█ Progressive Conservative
4	Danny Williams	7 years, 27 days	2003–2010	2	█ Progressive Conservative
5	Clyde Wells	6 years, 266 days	1989–1996	2	█ Liberal
6	Brian Tobin	4 years, 264 days	1996–2000	2	█ Liberal
7	Andrew Furey	4 years, 263 days	2020–2025	1	█ Liberal
8	Dwight Ball	4 years, 249 days	2015–2020	1	█ Liberal
9	Kathy Dunderdale	3 years, 52 days	2010–2014	1	█ Progressive Conservative
10	Roger Grimes	2 years, 266 days	2001–2003	0	█ Liberal
11	Paul Davis	1 year, 79 days	2014–2015	0	█ Progressive Conservative
14	Tony Wakeham	1 year, 16 days	2025–present	1	█ Progressive Conservative
12	Tom Marshall	244 days	2014	0	█ Progressive Conservative
13	John Hogan	173 days	2025	0	█ Liberal
15	Beaton Tulk	120 days	2000–2001	0	█ Liberal
16	Tom Rideout	44 days	1989	0	█ Progressive Conservative

== See also ==
- Leader of the Opposition (Newfoundland and Labrador)
- List of Newfoundland and Labrador lieutenant-governors
