= 1904 Newfoundland general election =

Election in the Colony of Newfoundland

- October 31, 1904

36 seats of the Newfoundland House of Assembly 19 seats needed for a majority
- Turnout: 71.17% (▲2.21pp)
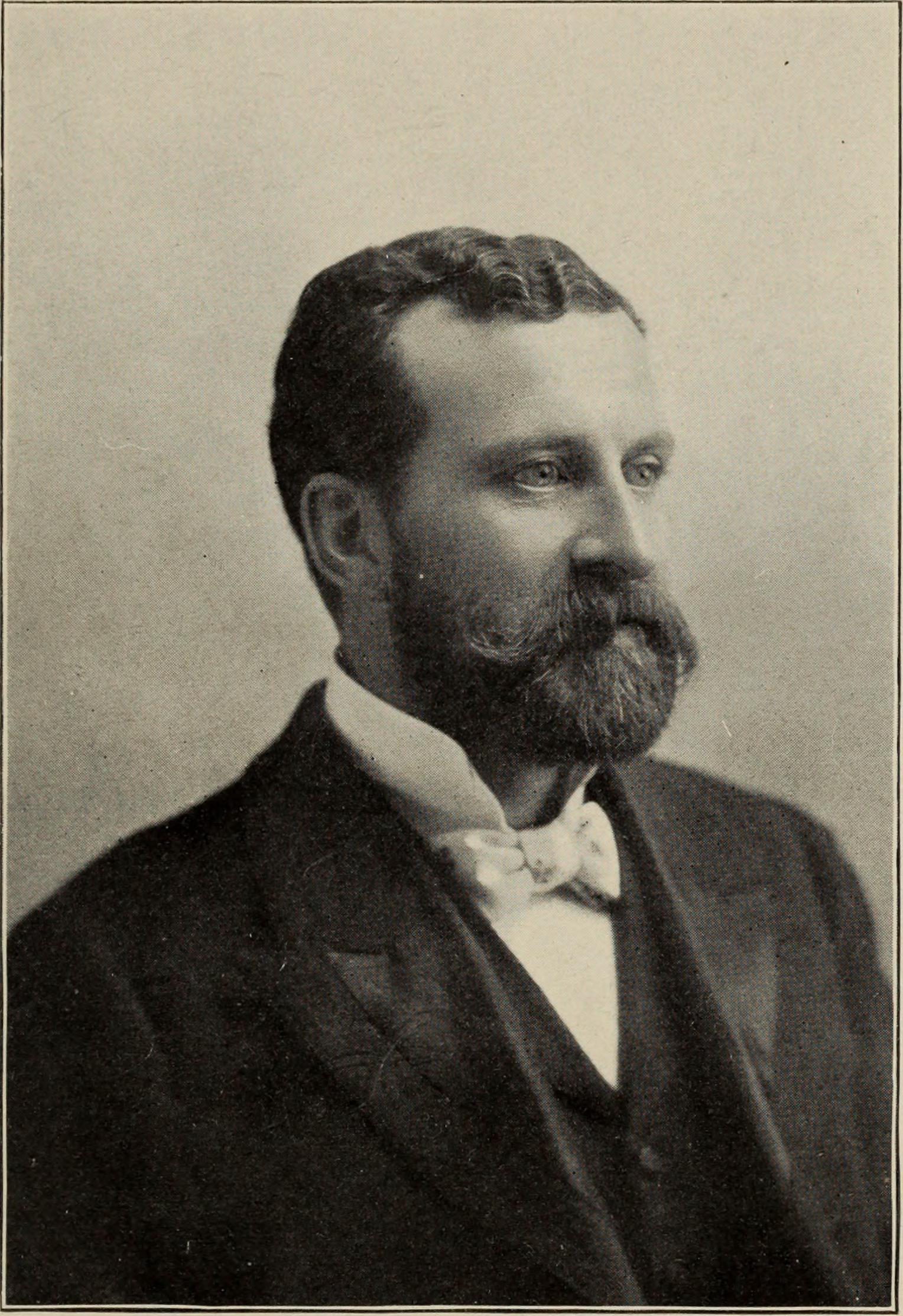

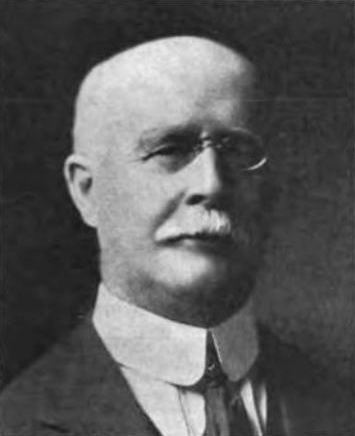
	First party	Second party
Leader	Robert Bond	Alfred Morine
Party	Liberal	United Opposition
Leader since	1897	1900
Leader's seat	Twillingate	Bonavista Bay
Last election	32	4 (Note: As the Conservative Party)
Seats won	30	6
Seat change	▼2	▲2
Popular vote	52,636	34,697
Percentage	60.02%	39.57%
Swing	▼2.66%	▲4.12%
- Results by district
Premier before election
Robert Bond
Liberal
Premier after election
Robert Bond
Liberal

The 1904 Newfoundland general election was held on 31 October 1904 to elect members of the 20th General Assembly of Newfoundland in the Newfoundland Colony. The Liberal Party led by Robert Bond formed the government.

== Results ==
Party	Leader	1900	Candidates	Seats won	Seat change	% of seats (% change)	Popular vote	% of vote (% change)
Liberal	Robert Bond	32	36	30	▼2	83.33% (▼5.56%)	52,636	60.02% (▼2.66%)
United Opposition	Alfred Morine	4	35	6	▲2	16.67% (▲5.56%)	34,697	39.57% (▲4.12%)
Other		0	1	0	Steady	0.00%	362	0.41% (▼1.46%)
Totals		36	72	36	Steady	100%	87,695 (Note: This figure includes votes cast for more than one candidate in multi-member districts. A total of 38,869 individual votes were cast in this election.)	100%

== Results by district ==
- Names in **boldface type** represent party leaders.
- † indicates that the incumbent did not run again.
- ‡ indicates that the incumbent ran in a different district.

=== St. John's ===
Electoral district	Candidates		Incumbent
Electoral district	Liberal (historical)	Conservative (historical)	Incumbent
St. John's East; 73.95% turnout	James Kent; 2,545; 23.47%	William Howley; 1,603; 14.78%	John Dwyer
St. John's East; 73.95% turnout	George Shea; 2,508; 23.13%	John W. McGrath; 981; 9.05%	Lawrence Furlong†
St. John's East; 73.95% turnout	John Dwyer; 2,339; 21.57%	Frank Viguers; 869; 8.01%	Thomas Murphy†
St. John's West; 76.12% turnout	Edward Morris; 2,394; 25.07%	John McCarthy; 1,073; 11.24%	Edward Morris
St. John's West; 76.12% turnout	John R. Bennett; 2,287; 23.95%	Thomas White; 942; 9.86%	John Anderson†
St. John's West; 76.12% turnout	John Scott; 2,082; 21.80%	William Wyler; 772; 8.08%	John Scott

=== Conception Bay ===
Electoral district	Candidates		Incumbent
Electoral district	Liberal (historical)	Conservative (historical)	Incumbent
Bay de Verde; 76.59% turnout	Charles Hutchings; 938; 25.14%	William C. Winsor; 941; 25.22%	Isaac Mercer†
Bay de Verde; 76.59% turnout	George Moores; 934; 25.03%	John Crosbie; 918; 24.60%	Michael Knight†
Carbonear; 67.10% turnout	Joseph Maddock; 497; 54.02%	John Goodison; 423; 45.98%	Joseph Maddock
Harbour Grace; 72.13% turnout	Eli Dawe; 1,158; 18.23%	Charles Dawe; 1,060; 16.69%	Eli Dawe
Harbour Grace; 72.13% turnout	William Oke; 1,141; 17.97%	Edward Parsons; 976; 15.37%	Vacant (Note: Augustus Harvey had been elected in 1900, but he died while in office on February 7, 1903.)
Harbour Grace; 72.13% turnout	Arthur Barnes; 1,132; 17.82%	William Whiteway; 884; 13.92%	William Oke
Harbour Main; 66.01% turnout	Frank Morris; 863; 28.10%	William Woodford; 745; 24.26%	Frank Morris
Harbour Main; 66.01% turnout	John Lewis; 764; 24.88%	Michael O'Toole; 699; 22.76%	John St. John†
Port de Grave; 68.63% turnout	Henry Dawe; 633; 47.99%	Alexander Mackay; 686; 52.01%	Alexander Mackay

=== Avalon Peninsula ===
Electoral district	Candidates		Incumbent
Electoral district	Liberal (historical)	Conservative (historical)	Incumbent
Ferryland; 82.01% turnout	Michael Cashin; 1,159; 45.27%	John Winsor; 497; 19.41%	Michael Cashin
Ferryland; 82.01% turnout	William Ellis; 904; 35.31%	John Winsor; 497; 19.41%	James Ryan†
Placentia and St. Mary's; 84.29% turnout	Edward Jackman; 2,376; 25.26%	Augustus Goodridge; 1,063; 11.30%	Edward Jackman
Placentia and St. Mary's; 84.29% turnout	Thomas Bonia; 2,296; 24.41%	Richard McGrath; 943; 10.03%	Thomas Bonia
Placentia and St. Mary's; 84.29% turnout	Michael Sullivan; 1,861; 19.79%	Rhodie Callahan; 866; 9.21%	Richard McGrath

=== Eastern Newfoundland ===
Electoral district	Candidates		Incumbent
Electoral district	Liberal (historical)	Conservative (historical)	Incumbent
Bonavista Bay; 60.99% turnout	John Roper; 1,304; 13.49%	**Alfred Morine**; 2,133; 22.07%	**Alfred Morine**
Bonavista Bay; 60.99% turnout	Thomas Howe; 1,197; 12.84%	Mark Chaplin; 2,032; 21.02%	Darius Blandford†
Bonavista Bay; 60.99% turnout	Samuel Winsor; 1,064; 11.01%	Sydney Blandford; 1,936; 20.02%	Mark Chaplin
Trinity Bay; 65.37% turnout	George Gushue; 1,893; 20.04%	Robert Watson; 1,544; 16.35%	George Gushue
Trinity Bay; 65.37% turnout	William Lloyd; 1,655; 17.52%	William Warren; 1,496; 15.84%	Robert Watson
Trinity Bay; 65.37% turnout	Arthur Miller; 1,560; 16.52%	Jesse Whiteway; 1,296; 13.72%	William Warren

=== Central Newfoundland ===
Electoral district	Candidates		Incumbent
Electoral district	Liberal (historical)	Conservative (historical)	Incumbent
Fogo; 58.66% turnout	Henry Earle; 902; 78.37%	Henry Fitzgerald; 249; 21.63%	Henry Earle
Twillingate; 74.77% turnout	**Robert Bond**; 2,425; 23.89%	Alan Goodridge; 1,248; 12.29%	**Robert Bond**
Twillingate; 74.77% turnout	James Clift; 2,287; 22.53%	Donald Morison; 1,182; 11.64%	James Clift
Twillingate; 74.77% turnout	George Roberts; 2,002; 19.72%	Frederick Mews; 1,007; 9.92%	George Roberts

=== Southern and Western Newfoundland ===
Electoral district	Candidates			Incumbent
Electoral district	Liberal (historical)	Conservative (historical)	Other	Incumbent
Burgeo and LaPoile; 80.02% turnout	Charles Emerson; 705; 49.72%	Robert Moulton; 713; 50.28%		Charles Emerson
Burin; 76.64% turnout	Edward Davey; 1,138; 31.14%	James Winter; 707; 19.34%		Henry Gear
Burin; 76.64% turnout	Henry Gear; 1,124; 30.75%	John A. Robinson; 686; 18.77%		Edward Davey
Fortune Bay; 67.84% turnout	Albert Martin; 955; 62.87%	Samuel Foote; 564; 37.13%		Charles Way†
St. Barbe; 65.53% turnout	William Clapp; 823; 60.29%	Albert Bradshaw; 180; 13.19%	Jonathan Noseworthy (Independent); 362; 26.52%	Alexander Parsons†
St. George's; 64.40% turnout	George Carty; 791; 50.25%	Michael Gibbs; 783; 49.75%		William Howley‡ (ran in St. John's East)
