= John S. Currie =

Newfoundland journalist and politician (1877–1956)

The Honourable John S. Currie MHA MLC
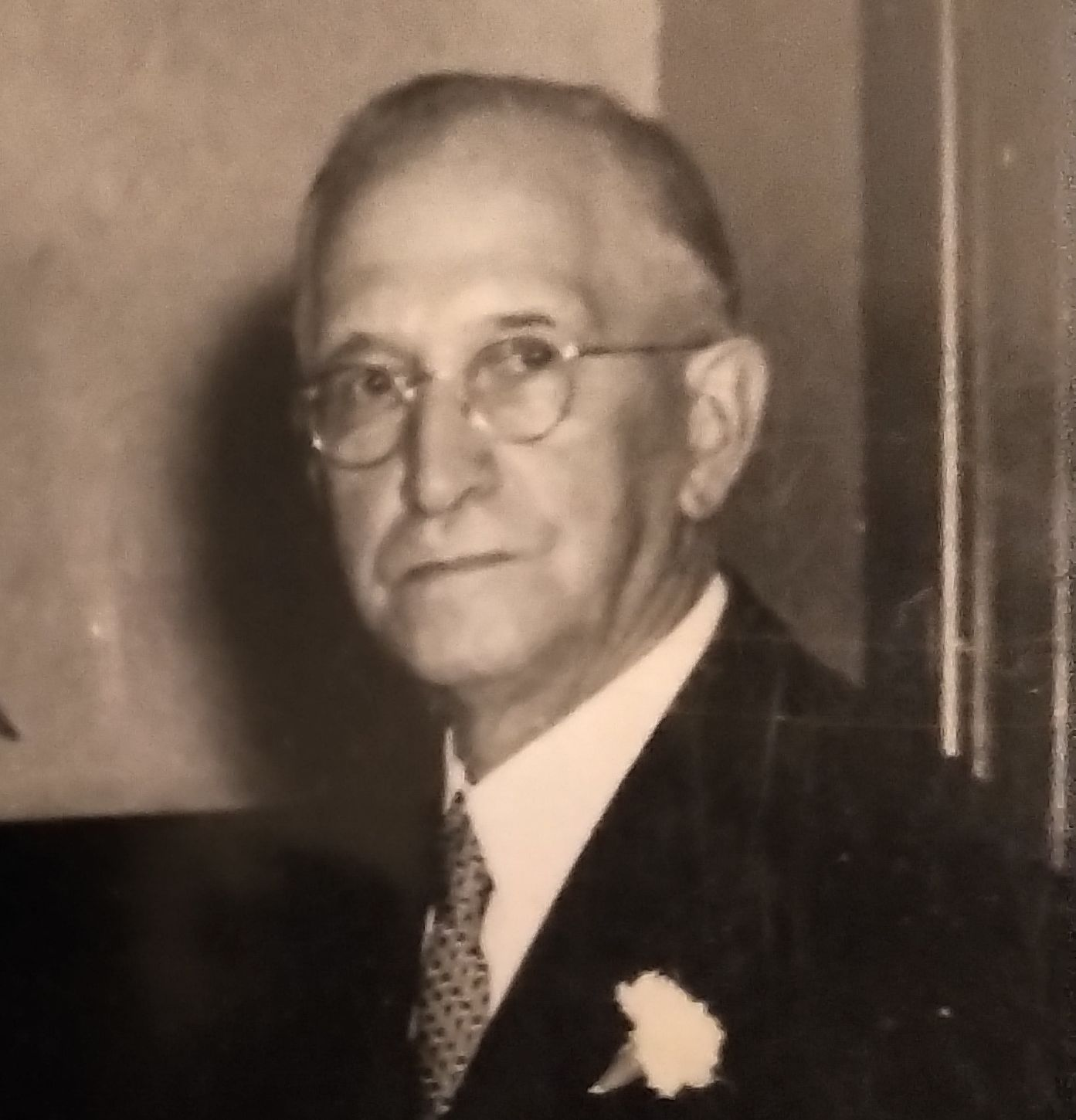
- Currie c. 1950

Minister without portfolio
- In office 1919–1919
- Prime Minister: Michael Cashin

Member of the Legislative Council of Newfoundland
- In office February 7, 1933 – February 16, 1934
- Nominated by: Frederick C. Alderdice
- Appointed by: Murray Anderson

Member of the Newfoundland House of Assembly for Burin
- In office October 30, 1913 – November 3, 1919 Serving with Thomas LeFeuvre
- Preceded by: Henry Gear
- Succeeded by: John T. Cheeseman; Samuel J. Foote

Personal details
- Born: John Stewart Currie; July 15, 1877 Carbonear, Newfoundland Colony
- Died: December 14, 1956 (aged 79) St. John's, Newfoundland
- Party: People's
- Spouse: Laura Chancey (m. 1902–1954)
- Children: 2, including Chancey
- Occupation: Journalist, newspaper editor

John Stewart Currie (1877 – December 14, 1956) was a journalist and politician in Newfoundland. He represented Burin in the Newfoundland House of Assembly from 1913 to 1919.

The son of John Gibson Currie, a native of Scotland, he was born in Carbonear and was educated there. Currie began working at the St. John's Daily News in 1894. In 1914, he organized the Permanent Marine Disasters Fund. He served in the Newfoundland cabinet as a minister without portfolio in 1919 but he was defeated when he ran for reelection in the general election held later that year. In 1932, Currie was named to the Legislative Council of Newfoundland. He was chairman of the board for Prince of Wales College and Holloway School. Near the end of his life, he became publisher for the Daily News. His son Chancey succeeded him as managing editor.

He married Laura Christian who predeceased him by a bit more than two years. Currie died at home in St. John's after a lengthy illness.
