= Charles Emerson =

Newfoundland lawyer and politician (1863–1919)

The Honourable Charles Emerson MHA

Member of the Newfoundland House of Assembly for Fortune Bay
- In office November 2, 1908 – November 1917
- Preceded by: Albert H. Martin
- Succeeded by: William Warren

Member of the Newfoundland House of Assembly for Burgeo-La Poile
- In office November 8, 1900 – October 31, 1904
- Preceded by: Henry Y. Mott
- Succeeded by: Robert Moulton

Personal details
- Born: Charles Henry Grigg Emerson; August 27, 1863 St. John's, Newfoundland Colony
- Died: February 18, 1919 (aged 55) Boston, Massachusetts, U.S.
- Party: Liberal (1900–1904); People's (1908–1919)
- Spouse: Helen Louise Scott (m. 1913)
- Relatives: Prescott Emerson (uncle)
- Education: Bishop Feild College
- Occupation: Lawyer

Charles Henry Grigg Emerson (August 27, 1863 – February 18, 1919) was a lawyer and politician in Newfoundland. He represented Burgeo-La Poile from 1900 to 1904 as a Liberal and Fortune Bay from 1908 to 1919 as a People's Party member in the Newfoundland House of Assembly.

== Early life and family ==
The son of John Archibald Sinclair Emerson and Jennie Bayley, he was born in St. John's and was educated at Bishop Feild College. Emerson practised law with his uncle Prescott Emerson. He was called to the Newfoundland bar in 1891.

In 1913, Emerson married Helen Louise Scott. His son Frederick Rennie Emerson was a lawyer, musician and composer who played an important role in promoting the awareness of Newfoundland's cultural heritage.

== Politics ==
Emerson ran unsuccessfully for a seat in the Newfoundland assembly in an 1894 by-election. He was elected to the assembly in 1900 and then was defeated when he ran for reelection in 1904 by his Conservative opponent Robert Moulton.

Emerson returned to politics in 1908 when he was elected for the district of Fortune Bay as a member of the new People's Party. From 1909 to 1917, he served in the Executive Council as a minister without portfolio in the administration of Edward Morris. Emerson resigned his seat in the House of Assembly in November 1917 and he was subsequently named registrar for the Supreme Court of Newfoundland.

Emerson died in Boston at the age of 55.
