= John Goodison =

John Goodison may refer to:

- John R. Goodison (1866–1926), merchant and political figure in Newfoundland
- John Goodison (musician) (died 1995), English rock musician and producer
