= Albert H. Martin =

Newfoundland politician (1859–1932)

Albert H. Martin MHA
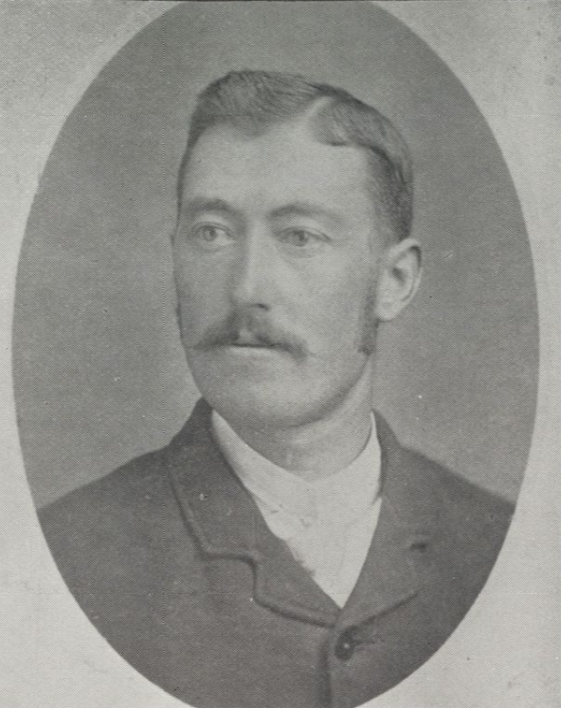
- Martin in 1894

Member of the Newfoundland House of Assembly for Fortune Bay
- In office October 31, 1904 – November 2, 1908
- Preceded by: Charles Way
- Succeeded by: Charles Emerson

Personal details
- Born: Albert Hudson Martin; September 8, 1859 St. John's, Newfoundland Colony
- Died: February 3, 1932 (aged 72) Montreal, Quebec, Canada
- Party: Liberal
- Spouse: Ellen Scarlett (m. 1890)
- Occupation: Merchant

Albert Hudson Martin (September 8, 1859 – February 3, 1932) was a Newfoundland businessman and politician. As a Liberal supporter of premier Robert Bond, he served as the member of the House of Assembly for Fortune Bay from 1904 to 1908.

== Business career ==
Martin was born on September 8, 1859 in the capital city of St. John's to Jonathan Parsons Martin and Elizabeth Holmes Martin (née Hudson). After graduating from the local Church of England academy, he worked his way up from office clerk to manager at the mercantile firm W. & G. Rendell. Martin joined the Newfoundland British Society in 1884 and he was elected as their president in 1890. That same year, he married Nellie Scarlett. By 1902, Martin had left W. & G. Rendell and had established his own mercantile business, Martin Brothers, with his brother William J. Martin.

== Politics ==
Martin first attempted to enter the Newfoundland House of Assembly in 1897 as a Liberal candidate in Bonavista Bay supporting premier William Whiteway, but he and his colleagues lost to the Conservative incumbents amidst the defeat of Whiteway's administration. Although Martin ran again for Bonavista Bay in the succeeding 1900 election that saw the Liberals under Robert Bond sweep into power, the three-member district remained solidly Conservative. In 1904, Martin instead ran for the single-member district of Fortune Bay and achieved a solid victory over Conservative candidate Samuel J. Foote.

Martin was a prominent supporter of the temperance movement in Newfoundland. He was in office for only a single term and chose to retire for the 1908 general election. Martin and his family moved to Montreal soon afterwards, and he died there on February 3, 1932.
