= George Gear (businessman) =

Newfoundland merchant (1822–1905)

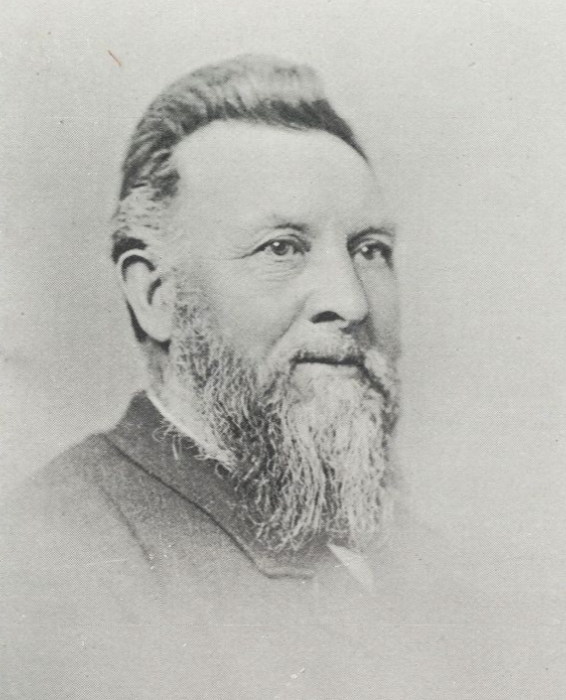
- Gear in 1894

Personal details
- Born: November 1, 1822 Bridport, Dorset, England, U.K.
- Died: February 13, 1905 (aged 82) Tennessee, U.S.
- Spouse: Jane Vey
- Children: Henry Gear
- Relatives: Ernest Gear (grandson)
- Occupation: Merchant

George Gear (November 1, 1822 – February 13, 1905) was an English-born merchant in Newfoundland.

He was born in Bridport, Dorset and came to St. John's around 1846. Gear established a tinsmith business there. The business grew to include the sale of imported goods such as hardware, stoves and plumbing supplies which were modified to suit local needs. Gear played an important role in the expansion of Newfoundland industry during this period. His son Henry took over the business around 1880.

He died in Tennessee at the age of 82.
