= Jesse Whiteway =

Newfoundland merchant and politician (1863–1940)

Jesse Whiteway MLC MHA
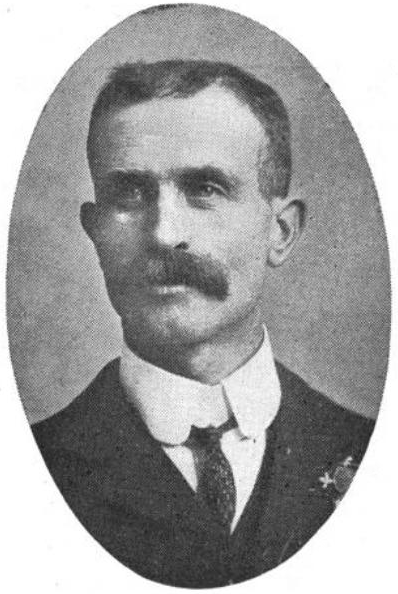
- Whiteway in 1919

Member of the Legislative Council of Newfoundland
- In office April 1, 1919 – May 19, 1919
- Nominated by: Michael Cashin
- Appointed by: Charles Alexander Harris
- Preceded by: James Angel

Member of the Newfoundland House of Assembly for Bay de Verde
- In office November 2, 1908 – October 30, 1913 Serving with John Crosbie
- Preceded by: William C. Winsor; Charles H. Hutchings
- Succeeded by: Albert Hickman

Personal details
- Born: November 12, 1862 Muddy Hole, Newfoundland Colony
- Died: May 18, 1940 (aged 77) St. John's, Newfoundland
- Party: People's
- Spouse: Mary E. Strange (m. 1889–1933)
- Children: 6
- Relatives: William Tuff Whiteway (brother); William C. Winsor (nephew)
- Education: Wesleyan Academy
- Occupation: Merchant

Jesse Whiteway (November 12, 1862 – May 18, 1940) was a merchant and politician in Newfoundland. He represented Bay de Verde in the Newfoundland House of Assembly from 1908 to 1913 as a member of the People's Party.

== Early life and business career ==
Whiteway was born in Muddy Hole (today Musgrave Harbour) on November 12, 1862, the son of Robert Whiteway and Ann Tuff. He was educated at the Wesleyan Academy in St. John's. Whiteway began work with a dry goods firm as a teenager and, in 1886, went into business in partnership with a brother. He married Mary E. Strange in 1889.

== Politics and later life ==
Whiteway was first elected to the Newfoundland assembly in 1908 as a member of the recently established People's Party led by Edward Morris. After being re-elected once in 1909, he was defeated in 1913. Whiteway was named to the Legislative Council of Newfoundland in 1919, but he resigned later that same year to unsuccessfully run for the seat in Bay de Verde in the 1919 general election. Whiteway also served on the board of governors for the General Hospital.

He died on May 18, 1940 in St. John's.
