= William F. Penney =

Newfoundland politician (1862–1934)

The Honourable William F. Penney MHA
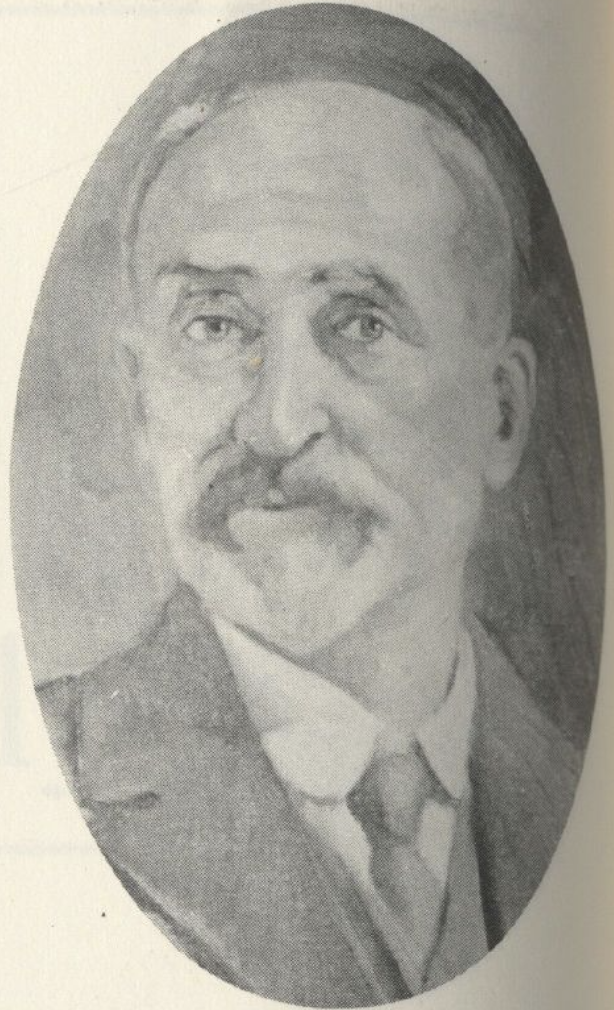
- Official portrait, 1923

22nd Speaker of the Newfoundland House of Assembly
- In office 1920–1923
- Preceded by: William J. Higgins
- Succeeded by: Harry A. Winter

Member of the Newfoundland House of Assembly for Carbonear
- In office November 3, 1919 – October 29, 1923
- Preceded by: John R. Goodison
- Succeeded by: James Moore

Personal details
- Born: William Frederick Penney; June 14, 1862 Carbonear, Newfoundland Colony
- Died: January 2, 1934 (aged 71) Carbonear, Newfoundland
- Party: Liberal Reform
- Spouse: Julia Guy
- Relatives: Alfred Penney (uncle)
- Occupation: Businessman

William Frederick Penney (June 14, 1862 – January 2, 1934) was a merchant, judge and political figure in Newfoundland. He represented Carbonear in the Newfoundland and Labrador House of Assembly from 1919 to 1923 as a Liberal Reform party member. His surname also appears as Penny in some sources.

He was born in Carbonear, the son of Edgar Penney. He entered the family fishery supply business, later opening his own business. Penney married Julia Guy. He was speaker for the Newfoundland House of Assembly from 1920 to 1923. In 1923, he was named district court judge for Carbonear, succeeding his uncle Alfred Penney, who had also served in the Newfoundland assembly.
