= John Joseph Murphy (Newfoundland MHA) =

Newfoundland politician (1849–1938)

John Joseph Murphy MLC MHA
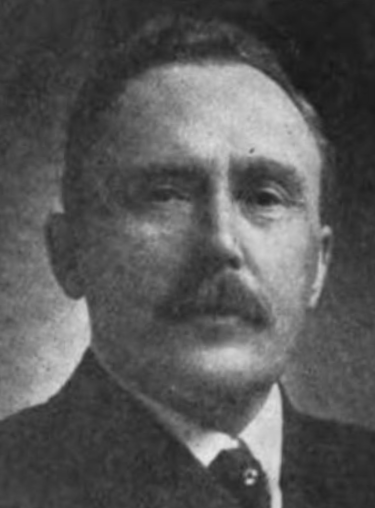
- Murphy in 1922

Member of the Legislative Council of Newfoundland
- In office 1913 – February 16, 1934
- Nominated by: Edward Morris
- Appointed by: Walter Davidson

Member of the Newfoundland House of Assembly for Harbour Main
- In office November 2, 1908 – October 30, 1913 Serving with William Woodford
- Preceded by: John Lewis; Frank Morris
- Succeeded by: George Kennedy

Personal details
- Born: May 13, 1849 Catalina, Newfoundland Colony
- Died: August 4, 1938 (aged 89) St. John's, Newfoundland
- Party: People's
- Spouse: Margaret Walsh (m. 1889)
- Children: 2 sons
- Education: Saint Bonaventure's College
- Occupation: Businessman

John Joseph Murphy (May 13, 1849 – August 4, 1938) was a businessman and politician. He represented Harbour Main in the Newfoundland House of Assembly from 1908 to 1913 as a People's Party member.

== Biography ==
The son of James Murphy, a ship's captain, and Alice McDonald, he was born at Catalina and was educated at Saint Bonaventure's College. In 1869, he became manager of the Greenspond branch of the firm Ridley and Sons. From 1871 to 1876, Murphy operated his own fishery supply business. In 1876, he established a shipbuilding company and sawmill at Gambo. He married Margaret Walsh from Harbour Grace in 1889. In 1893, he built a hotel in Gambo. He sold his sawmill and timber cutting rights to Newfoundland Timber Estates in 1904. By 1914, he had become majority share-holder for United Towns Electric Company; he was elected company president the following year. In 1919, he formed the Avalon Telephone Company. In 1932, he set up the Dominion Broadcasting Company and radio station VONF.

Murphy did not run for reelection to the Newfoundland assembly in 1913. However, he was named to the Legislative Council later that year and served there until 1934.

Murphy died in St. John's at the age of 89.
