= Alfred Henry Seymour =

Newfoundland politician and magistrate (1855–1912)

Alfred H. Seymour MHA
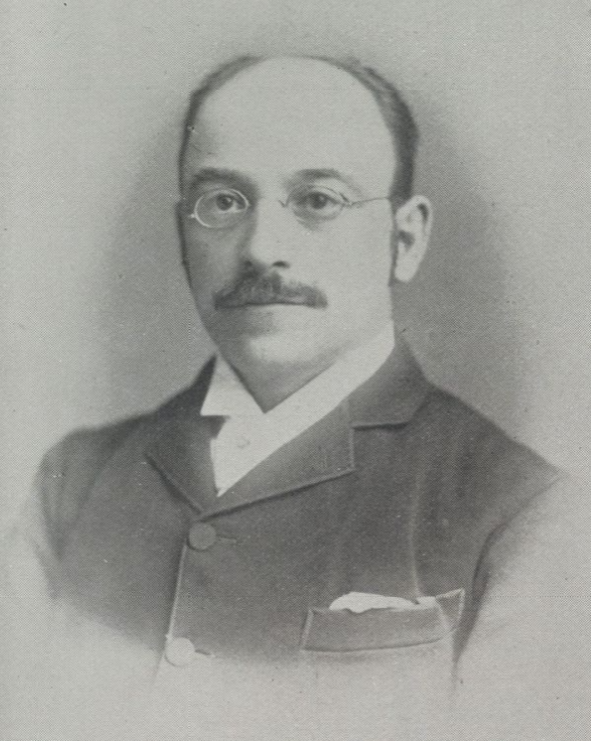
- Seymour in 1894

Member of the Newfoundland House of Assembly for Harbour Grace
- In office May 8, 1909 – May 11, 1912 Serving with Edward Parsons and Archibald Piccott
- Preceded by: Eli Dawe
- Succeeded by: Moses M. Young

Personal details
- Born: August 1, 1855 St. John's, Newfoundland Colony
- Died: May 11, 1912 (aged 56) Montreal, Quebec, Canada
- Party: People's
- Spouse: Jessie Spencer (m. 1877)
- Occupation: Grocer, magistrate

Alfred Henry Seymour (August 1, 1855 – May 11, 1912) was a politician and magistrate in Newfoundland. He represented Harbour Grace in the Newfoundland House of Assembly from 1909 to 1912.

The son of Henry Seymour, he was born in St. John's and was educated at the Methodist College there. He apprenticed as a draper but then joined his father's grocery business. Seymour was named customs officer at Harbour Grace. He was appointed sheriff for the Northern district in 1892, then was named judge in the district court for Harbour Grace in 1895 and magistrate at Greenspond in 1897. From 1900 to 1908, he was magistrate at Harbour Grace. Seymour was also a freemason and was involved in the temperance movement. He ran unsuccessfully for a seat in the Newfoundland assembly in 1908 but was elected the following year. Seymour died in office in 1912.
