= Joseph Downey (Newfoundland politician) =

Newfoundland politician (1852–1933)

The Honourable Joseph Downey MHA

Member of the Newfoundland House of Assembly for St. George's
- In office October 29, 1928 – June 11, 1932
- Preceded by: Thomas Power
- Succeeded by: William Abbott (as MHA for St. George's-Port au Port)
- In office May 3, 1923 – June 2, 1924
- Preceded by: James MacDonnell
- Succeeded by: Thomas Power
- In office November 2, 1908 – November 3, 1919
- Preceded by: George Carty
- Succeeded by: James MacDonnell

Personal details
- Born: 1852 St. John's, Newfoundland Colony
- Died: February 15, 1933 (aged 80–81) St. John's, Newfoundland
- Party: Newfoundland People's Party (1908–1919); Liberal-Progressive (1919); Liberal Reform (1923–1932)
- Education: Saint Bonaventure's College
- Occupation: Clerk

Joseph F. Downey (1852 – February 15, 1933) was a civil servant and political figure in Newfoundland. He represented St. George's in the Newfoundland and Labrador House of Assembly from 1908 to 1919 as a member of the Newfoundland People's Party and in 1923 and from 1928 to 1932 as a Liberal.

He was born in St. John's and educated at Saint Bonaventure's College. Downey worked as a clerk in the Crown Lands Office and was also involved in the lumber trade. He was defeated when he ran for reelection in 1919 and in 1924. He served in the Executive Council as Minister of Agriculture and Mines. Downey retired from politics in 1932. He died the following year.
