= Edward Henry Davey =

Newfoundland politician (1854–1911)

Edward H. Davey MHA
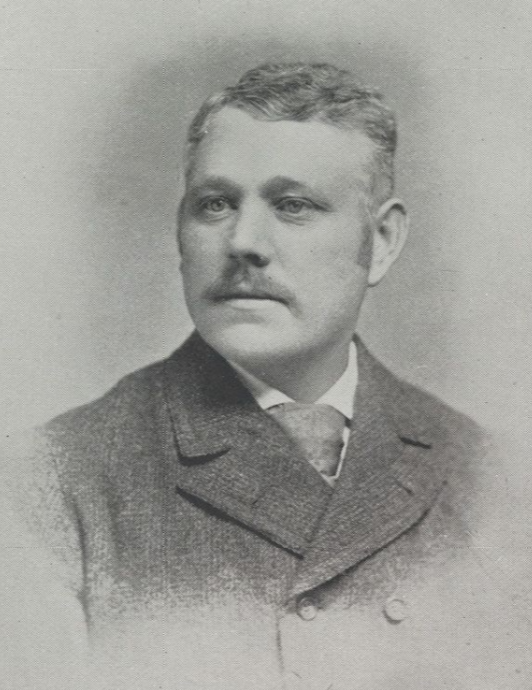
- Davey in 1894

Member of the Newfoundland House of Assembly for Burin
- In office November 8, 1900 – March 10, 1911 Serving with Henry Gear
- Preceded by: John E. Lake; James S. Winter
- Succeeded by: Thomas LeFeuvre

Personal details
- Born: January 19, 1854 St. John's, Newfoundland Colony
- Died: March 10, 1911 (aged 57) St. John's, Newfoundland
- Party: Liberal
- Spouse: Laura Stevenson Wills
- Occupation: Architect

Edward Henry Davey (January 19, 1854 – March 10, 1911) was an architect and politician born in St. John’s, Newfoundland. He is best known, along with his brother George, as a builder of the city of St. John's after the great fire of 1892. As a Liberal supporter of Prime Minister Robert Bond, Davey represented the district of Burin from 1900 until his death.

== Early life and architectural career ==
Davey was educated at the Central School in St. John’s and underwent an apprenticeship with his father, also a carpenter, forming a partnership between father and son. Upon the death of his father, he went into business with his brother George and to form E.H. and G. Davey, Contractors, Builders and Ships Joiners. The company’s offices were located at 111 Bond Street with wharf and stores situated on the St. John’s waterfront.

In the aftermath of the great fire of 1892, there was great demand for architects, contractors and builders. The Davey brothers were at the forefront of this massive effort and were responsible for many of the new buildings that were erected in the months following the fire such as the Church of England Orphanage, the British Hall and the restoration of the Church of England Cathedral of St. John the Baptist.

Davey was involved in many facets of the Church of England, serving on the Diocesan Synod for Newfoundland, as a member of the Vestry at the Cathedral and as a member of the Cathedral Restoration Committee. He was a long-time member of St. John’s Lodge No. 5 of the Society of United Fishermen, a philanthropic and fraternal organization founded in Heart’s Content in 1871. Davey was also a very good cricket player and was elected president of the Avalon Cricket Club in 1891. He was also quite prominent in the Freemasons.

== Politics ==
By 1900, the company was very successful and Davey decided to enter politics. In the 1900 election, both Davey and his running mate, Henry Gear, won the dual district of Burin for the Liberal Party led by Robert Bond. Davey spent 11 years as MHA for Burin. He was re-elected in the general elections of 1904, 1908, and 1909.
