= Archibald Piccott =

Newfoundland politician

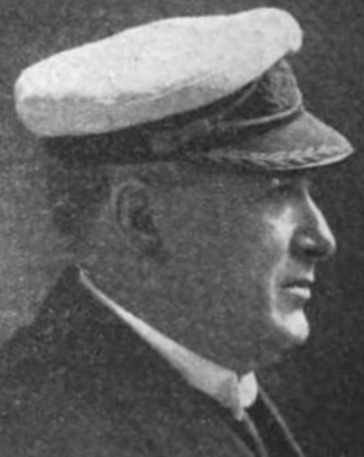

Member of the Newfoundland House of Assembly
- Constituency: Harbour Grace
- In office 1908–1919
- In office 1923–1924

Personal details
- Born: August 21, 1869; Cupids, Newfoundland
- Died: March 16, 1926 (aged 56); Bay Roberts, Newfoundland
- Political party: People's (1908–1919); Liberal (1923–1924)
- Occupation: Politician

Archibald W. Piccott (August 21, 1869 – March 16, 1926) was a politician in Newfoundland. He represented Harbour Grace in the Newfoundland House of Assembly from 1908 to 1919 as a member of the People's Party and from 1923 to 1924 as a Liberal.

== Biography ==
The son of William Piccott and Mary Webber, he was born in Cupids on August 21, 1869, and was educated there and in Bay Roberts. Piccott left school at a young age to go to sea but returned after losing a hand in an accident. He took commercial training and joined a dry goods firm and then a company that operated a sawmill. Piccott then moved to Nova Scotia and went to sea again. He returned to Newfoundland again around 1896, working on a ship which travelled between Brigus and Halifax and also operating a shop in Bay Roberts. In 1917, he became local manager for the Gordon-Pew Fisheries Company.

Piccott served in the Newfoundland cabinet as Minister of Marine and Fisheries. During World War I he was a member of the Home Defence Committee of the Newfoundland Patriotic Association. He was defeated when he ran for re-election to the assembly in 1919. In 1921, he was named secretary to the Minister of Shipping. In 1923, he was named Minister of Public Works. He did not run for reelection in 1924. He died at home in Bay Roberts at the age of 56 following an extended illness.
