= Joseph Maddock =

Politician and businessman

Joseph G. Maddock, Esq. MHA
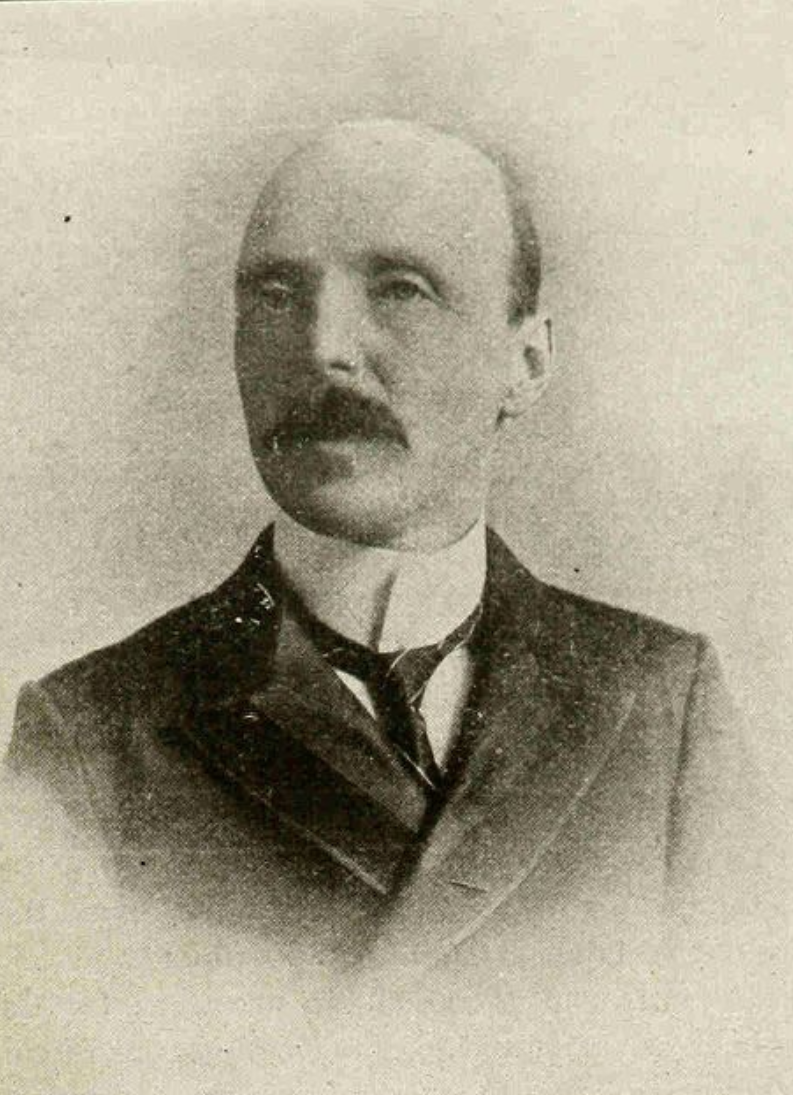
- Maddock in 1906

Member of the Newfoundland House of Assembly for Carbonear
- In office 1900–1909
- Monarchs: Queen Victoria; Edward VII
- Prime Minister: Robert Bond
- Premier: James Spearman Winter; Robert Bond
- Preceded by: William Duff Sr.
- Succeeded by: John R. Goodison

Personal details
- Born: Joseph Guy Maddock; 28 October 1862 Carbonear, Colony of Newfoundland
- Died: 26 October 1942 (aged 79) Carbonear, Dominion of Newfoundland
- Party: Liberal
- Spouse: Emily Louisa Bemister
- Occupation: Politician, Businessman

Joseph Guy Maddock, Esq. (1862–1942) was a Newfoundland politician and businessman from Carbonear, who represented Carbonear in the Newfoundland House of Assembly from 1900 to 1909.

== Biography ==
Maddock was born in Carbonear in 1862. He was the eldest son of Robert Maddock. His father was the owner of a merchant firm, J. & R. Maddock, located in Carbonear. Once Maddock finished schooling, he and his brother, John, took over the firm and renamed it J. & J. Maddock.

In 1900, Maddock was selected as the Liberal Party candidate for Carbonear and was elected to the Newfoundland House of Assembly shortly after. He was re-elected again in 1904.

Maddock died at Carbonear in 1942.
