= Michael Kennedy (Newfoundland politician) =

Newfoundland politician

Michael J. Kennedy (1858 – 1917) was a building contractor and politician in Newfoundland. He represented St. John's West (provincial electoral district) in the Newfoundland House of Assembly from 1908 to 1917 as a member of the People's Party.

He was born in St. John's and worked for his father as a plasterer. He started up a construction firm in partnership with his brother in 1892. The company found much work with the rebuilding following the Great Fire of 1892. Kennedy was elected to St. John's municipal council in 1902 and 1906. He died before the end of his last term in the Newfoundland assembly.
