= Henry Gear =

Newfoundland politician (1859–1945)

The Honourable Henry Gear MHA
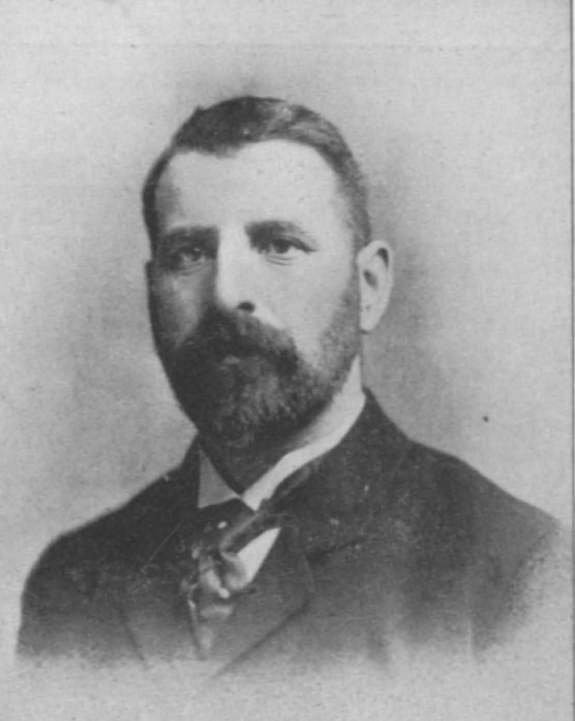
- Gear in 1903

Minister without portfolio
- In office 1903 – March 2, 1909
- Prime Minister: Robert Bond

Member of the Newfoundland House of Assembly for Burin
- In office November 8, 1900 – October 30, 1913 Serving with Edward H. Davey (1900–1911); Thomas LeFeuvre (1911–1913)
- Preceded by: John E. Lake; James S. Winter
- Succeeded by: John S. Currie
- In office November 10, 1894 – October 28, 1897 Serving with James J. Pitman
- Preceded by: James S. Tait; William B. Payne
- Succeeded by: John E. Lake; James S. Winter

Personal details
- Born: November 1859 St. John's, Newfoundland Colony
- Died: June 15, 1945 (aged 85) St. John's, Newfoundland
- Party: Liberal
- Spouse: Ellen Boyd McDougall
- Relatives: George Gear (father); Ernest Gear (son)
- Occupation: Businessman

Henry Gear (November 1859 – June 15, 1945) was a businessman and politician in Newfoundland. He represented Burin in the Newfoundland House of Assembly from 1894 to 1897 and from 1900 to 1913.

== Early life and business career ==
The son of George Gear, he was born in St. John's. In 1880, he took over control of his father's business, operating in partnership with W. J. Barnes as Gear and Company. The company manufactured and imported various items. A few years later, Gear opened a second business, H. Gear and Company.

== Politics and family ==
He was first elected to the Newfoundland assembly in an 1894 by-election. Gear was defeated when he ran for reelection in 1897 but was reelected in 1900, serving until his defeat in 1913. He served in the cabinet as a minister without portfolio from 1904 to 1909.

His son Ernest also served in the Newfoundland assembly and was the last person elected to the assembly from the Dominion of Newfoundland.
