= John R. Goodison =

Newfoundland politician

The Honourable John R. Goodison MHA

20th Speaker of the Newfoundland House of Assembly
- In office 1914–1918
- Preceded by: William Warren
- Succeeded by: William J. Higgins

Member of the Newfoundland House of Assembly for Carbonear
- In office May 8, 1909 – 1918
- Preceded by: Joseph Maddock
- Succeeded by: William F. Penney

Personal details
- Born: John Rorke Goodison; 1866 Carbonear, Newfoundland Colony
- Died: December 14, 1926 (aged 59–60) Carbonear, Newfoundland
- Party: People's
- Spouse: Mary Penney
- Relatives: William F. Penney (brother-in-law); John Rorke (grandfather)
- Education: Eastbourne College
- Occupation: Businessman

John R. Goodison (1866 – December 14, 1926) was a merchant and political figure in Newfoundland. He represented Carbonear in the Newfoundland and Labrador House of Assembly from 1909 to 1918 as a member of the Newfoundland People's Party.

He was born in Carbonear, the son of the Reverend John C. Goodison and Elizabeth Ann Rorke, the daughter of John Rorke. Goodison was educated in Carbonear and in Eastbourne, England. He first entered the business established by his grandfather John Rorke, but later moved to Boston, returning to Newfoundland in 1901 and reentering the family business. Goodison served as speaker for the Newfoundland assembly from 1914 to 1918, when he resigned his seat. Goodison was then named a government purchasing agent and a public censor. He served as an inspector of lighthouses from 1918 until 1920, when he was named accountant for the Government Savings Bank.
