= Charles H. Hutchings =

Canadian politician

Charles Henry Hutchings CMG OBE KC (October 1, 1869 – June 1946) was a lawyer and politician in Newfoundland. He represented Bay de Verde in the Newfoundland House of Assembly from 1904 to 1908 as a Liberal.

He was born in St. John's and was educated at the Methodist College there and at Mount Allison University. Hutchings was called to the Newfoundland bar in 1892. He ran unsuccessfully for the Bay de Verde seat in the Newfoundland assembly in an 1894 by-election, in 1897, Hutchings was named a Master in Chancery for the Legislative Council of Newfoundland. In 1900, he was an unsuccessful candidate for the Bonavista seat in the assembly. He was then appointed Deputy Minister of Justice. He was named King's Counsel in 1904.

Hutchings was elected to the assembly in 1904 and did not run for reelection in 1908. He was subsequently re-appointed Deputy Minister of Justice. Hutchings served as acting judge for the Central District Court in 1916 and 1917. In 1917, Hutchings was named Inspector General of the Constabulary and Fire Department, continuing to serve until 1934. He was a member of the Home Defence Committee during World War I. He served on the Economic Commission created in 1929 to investigate unemployment in Newfoundland.

In 1931, he was named a Companion in the Order of St Michael and St George.

Hutchings married Annie Maude White on August 24, 1893, the daughter of William and Annie (Nightingale) White and had a family of seven children. On June 17, 1942, Hutchings died in Toronto at the age of 76.
