= Thomas LeFeuvre =

Newfoundland businessman and politician

Thomas LeFeuvre (1878–1959) was a merchant and politician in Newfoundland. He represented Burin in the Newfoundland House of Assembly from 1911 to 1919.

The son of Frank LeFeuvre, he was born in Bull's Cove and was educated in Burin and at the Church of England Teacher's Training College in St. John's. He taught school for a time and then joined his brothers in the firm LeFeuvre Brothers. He served as Sunday school superintendent in Burin for 64 years. LeFeuvre married Florence White.

LeFeuvre ran unsuccessfully for the Burin seat in the Newfoundland assembly in 1908 and 1909. Following the death of Edward Henry Davey in 1911, he was elected to the assembly in a by-election. He was reelected in 1913. LeFeuvre ran unsuccessfully as a representative to the Newfoundland National Convention in 1946.
