= Arthur William Miller =

Newfoundland politician

Arthur William Miller (1854 – September 4, 1934) was a politician in Newfoundland. He represented Trinity in the Newfoundland House of Assembly from 1904 to 1909 as a Liberal.

The son of Samuel Miller and Amy Ivany, he was born in New Bonaventure and was educated there. Miller married Mary Carter. He worked as a commercial traveller and mercantile agent in the Bonavista Bay and Trinity Bay regions. He was defeated when he ran for re-election in 1909. Miller served as superintendent of the Poor Asylum at St. John's from 1920 to 1930. He died at St. John's in 1934.
