= George T. Carty =

Irish-Canadian lawyer and politician

George Thomas Carty (died 1928) was an Irish-born lawyer and politician in Newfoundland. He represented St. George's in the Newfoundland House of Assembly from 1904 to 1909 as a Liberal.

He was born in County Sligo and grew up there. Carty came to Newfoundland with his family in 1873. He worked as a solicitor in his brother Michael's law firm. He was named captain in the Royal Newfoundland Regiment at the start of World War I and saw action with the British Mediterranean Expeditionary Force. He was injured, was sent to a British hospital and returned to Newfoundland in 1916. He was called to the Newfoundland bar later that year. He served as Officer Commanding Depot and District Officer Commanding at St. John's before retiring from service at the rank of Colonel in 1919. Carty was named stipendiary magistrate for St. George's district in 1921, serving until his death in 1928.
