= John Lewis (Newfoundland politician) =

Newfoundland politician

John Lewis (1867 – January 21, 1922) was a fisherman, mariner and politician in Newfoundland. He represented Harbour Main from 1904 to 1908 and from 1921 to 1922 in the Newfoundland and Labrador House of Assembly as a Liberal.

He was born in Holyrood, the son of Philip Lewis and Mary O'Keefe, and was educated there. Lewis married Elizabeth Veitch. He was defeated when he ran for reelection in 1908, 1909 and 1913. Lewis served as Newfoundland commercial agent in Spain in 1920. He was reelected in a 1921 by-election. He died of typhoid fever in Naples in 1922 while travelling as a representative of A.E. Hickman & Co. in Italy.

His son Philip later served in the Newfoundland assembly.
