= Robert Moulton =

Newfoundland businessman and politician

Robert M. Moulton (1856 – September 6, 1928) was a merchant and politician in Newfoundland. He represented Burgeo-La Poile in the Newfoundland House of Assembly from 1904 to 1917.:

He was born in Pouch Cove and first came to Burgeo as manager of a cod oil factory. He set up a business there outfitting fishing vessels;; his business later expanded to include branches at Burnt Islands, Lo Poile, Grand Bruit, Ramea and Rose Blanche. He was first elected to the assembly as a Conservative; in 1908, he joined the People's Party. His business started experiencing difficulties in 1910 and was taken over by a consortium of St. John's merchants in 1912. Moulton moved to New York City during World War I and died there in 1929.:
