= Edward Morris, 1st Baron Morris =

Newfoundland lawyer, politician, and Prime Minister (1909-1917)

The Right Honourable The Lord Morris KCMG PC
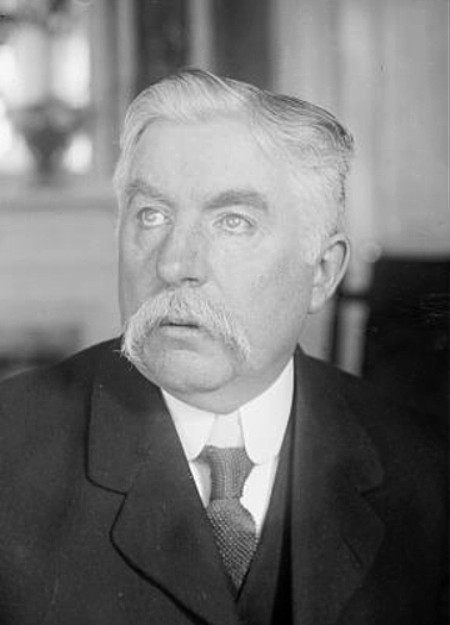

2nd Prime Minister of Newfoundland
- In office 2 March 1909 – 31 December 1917
- Monarchs: Edward VII; George V
- Governor: William MacGregor; William Horwood (acting); Ralph Champneys Williams; Walter Edward Davidson; Charles Alexander Harris
- Preceded by: Robert Bond
- Succeeded by: John Chalker Crosbie

Member of the Newfoundland House of Assembly for St. John's West
- In office February 27, 1895 – November 3, 1919 Serving with Thomas Jackman (1895–1897); Patrick Scott (1895–1897); James Callanan (1897–1900); James Tessier (1897–1900); John Anderson (1900–1904); John Scott (1900–1908); John R. Bennett (1904–1919); Michael Kennedy (1908–1917)
- Preceded by: George Tessier
- Succeeded by: Henry Brownrigg; Richard Squires
- In office October 31, 1885 – November 10, 1894 Serving with James Callanan (1885–1889); Patrick Scott (1885–1889); James Day (1889–1893); Lawrence Gearin (1889–1893); Martin W. Furlong (1893–1894); James Tessier (1893–1894)
- Preceded by: Philip D. White
- Succeeded by: Thomas Jackman; Patrick Scott; George Tessier

Personal details
- Born: May 8, 1859 St. John's, Newfoundland Colony
- Died: October 24, 1935 (aged 76) London, England
- Party: Independent (1885–1889); Liberal (1889–1908); People's (1908–1917)
- Spouse: Isabel Langridge LeGallais (m. 1901)
- Children: 1 son (Michael)
- Profession: Lawyer

Sir Edward Patrick Morris, 1st Baron Morris KCMG PC (8 May 1859 – 24 October 1935) was a Newfoundlander lawyer and Prime Minister of Newfoundland.

Born in St. John's, the son of Edward Morris and Catherine Fitzgerald, he was educated at Saint Bonaventure's College and the University of Ottawa, was admitted to the bar in 1885 and went into practice with his brother Francis. In 1901, he married Isabel Langrishe LeGallais. Morris was a counsel for the British government during the North American fisheries arbitration in 1910 receiving a knighthood in 1904. Morris served as governor of the Newfoundland Savings Bank from 1889 to 1913 and was elected to the Newfoundland House of Assembly in 1885 as an independent. He joined the Liberal government of Sir William Whiteway as Attorney-General from 1889 to 1895.

Morris was the most senior Roman Catholic politician in Newfoundland and had enormous influence as a result. He had a strained relationship with Whiteway's successor as Liberal leader, Sir Robert Bond, splitting with him to form the Independent Party which he led from 1898 to 1900. Morris formed an alliance with Bond to defeat the Tories and served as minister of justice from 1900 to 1907 in Bond's government. In 1907 he again broke with Bond and formed the People's Party. Both parties tied in the 1908 General Election. Robert Bond was asked to form a government. He refused saying he could not because he could not elect a speaker, without losing a vote and thereby bringing down the government. Morris said he could form a government and was made Prime Minister. He lost a confidence vote and then called an election. He led his party to victory in the 1909 election with a clear majority. He served in that position through the First World War and represented Newfoundland at the Imperial War Conference in London.

His People's Party government enjoyed strong support from the dominion's Catholics but was largely opposed by Protestants. As a result of a wartime crisis over conscription, and the decline of his popularity due to accusations of wartime profiteering and conflict of interest, Morris decided that it was necessary to have a government that had support from all denominations and so he invited the opposition in the House of Assembly to join a National Government which was formed in 1917 to oversee the duration of the war. Morris retired from politics at the end of 1917 after eight years in power.

He was sworn in as a member of His Majesty's Most Honourable Privy Council at Buckingham Palace on 5 July 1911. This gave him the Honorific Prefix "The Right Honourable" and after Ennoblement the Post Nominal Letters "PC" for Life.

Morris was made a Knight Commander in the Order of St Michael and St George in 1913.

On 15 January 1918, Morris was elevated to the peerage as the first Baron Morris, of St John's in the Dominion of Newfoundland and of the City of Waterford, the only Newfoundland-born person to ever be so honoured. Lord Morris moved to London and took his seat in the House of Lords. He lived the rest of his life there, only returning to Newfoundland once. He died in London, in 1935, at the age of 76. He was buried at St Mary's Catholic Cemetery in Kensal Green, London.

== Coat of arms ==
Coat of arms of Edward Morris, 1st Baron Morris
Adopted 1918 Coronet Baron's coronet Crest A caribou’s head proper charged on the neck with a trefoil Or Escutcheon Barry wavy Argent and Azure two cod fish naiant proper, on a chief Azure a two-masted schooner in full sail proper Supporters Two caribou proper each charged on the shoulder with a trefoil Or Motto SEMPER FIDELIS (Latin for 'Always faithful') Orders Order of St. Michael and St. George: Auspicium Melioris Ævi (Latin for 'Token of a Better Age')

Peerage of the United Kingdom
New creation	Baron Morris; 1918–1935	Succeeded by Michael Morris
