= Newfoundland People's Party =

- Founded: 1907
- Dissolved: 1923
- Headquarters: St. John's
- Ideology: Social democracy Irish Catholic interests
- Political position: Centre-left

The Newfoundland People's Party was a political party in the Dominion of Newfoundland before it joined Canada.

The party was created by Attorney-General Edward Patrick Morris in 1907, when he split from the ruling Liberal Party to found his own political vehicle. The party tied with the Liberals in the 1908 election but, when no party was able to form a government, new elections were held which the People's Party won with 26 seats to 10 for the Liberals.

Morris and the People's Party were re-elected in the 1913 election, winning 16 seats compared to 7 for the Liberals and 8 for the Fishermen's Protective Union led by William Coaker.

In 1917, a wartime crisis over conscription resulted in Morris inviting the opposition parties to join in a National Government, which ruled for two years. Morris retired at the end of 1917, and was replaced as People's Party leader by Sir Michael Patrick Cashin.

Cashin's government was defeated in the 1919 election by Richard Squires and his Liberal Reform Party (a merger between the Liberals and the FPU). In opposition, Cashin changed the name of the party to the Liberal-Labour-Progressive Party, which contested the 1923 election but disappeared afterwards. Some members of that party joined Albert Hickman's new Liberal-Progressive Party, while others joined with Tories to form the Liberal-Conservative Progressive Party.

Although not a sectarian party, the People's Party and its immediate successor had their support concentrated among Catholic voters, particularly on the south coast of the island.

== List of Leaders ==
Newfoundland People's Party

- Edward Patrick Morris 1907-1917
- Michael Patrick Cashin 1917-1919

Liberal-Labour-Progressive Party of Newfoundland

- Michael Patrick Cashin 1919-1923

== See also ==
- List of political parties in Newfoundland and Labrador
- General elections in Newfoundland (pre-Confederation)
- List of Newfoundland Prime Ministers
