= Liberal parties in pre-Confederation Newfoundland =

Political parties in pre-confederation Newfoundland

Several political groupings functioned in the Dominion of Newfoundland under the name Liberal Party of Newfoundland from the granting of responsible government to the island in the 1850s until its suspension in 1934 when the Commission of Government was instituted. During that period, Newfoundland was an independent dominion within the British Empire, responsible for its own internal affairs.

The original Liberal Party was originally a coalition of Catholics and Methodists who opposed the Anglican-dominated political establishment. This party agitated for the granting of 'responsible government' to the island. Shortly after responsible government was instituted in 1854, the Methodists left the party to join the Anglicans in the Conservative Party, leaving the Liberals as a predominantly Irish Catholic party. Political parties in the dominion were thus divided along sectarian lines for the next thirty years - a situation that resulted in periodic riots and other political violence. This division also reflected class differences: most Catholics were working class or farmers, and most members of the middle and business classes were Protestant.

In the 1880s, a denominational compromise was reached and political parties realigned with a new Liberal Party being formed by former Conservative Premier William Whiteway. Whiteway launched the new Liberal Party as a vehicle to promote the construction of a cross-island railway.

Under Robert Bond, the Liberals suffered a split when Edward Patrick Morris left to form the Newfoundland People's Party. The NPP won the 1909 and 1913 elections. In 1919, Richard Squires merged his Liberal Party with the Fishermen's Protective Union to form the Liberal Reform Party. The Liberal Reform Party won the 1919 election, but collapsed prior to the 1924 election due to a crisis over corruption. This crisis toppled both Squires and his successor, William Warren. In 1923, some members of the Liberal Reform Party joined with Albert Hickman and John Robert Bennett to form a new Liberal-Progressive Party.

Many former supporters of William Warren joined in alliance with former Conservative leader William J. Higgins to form the Liberal-Conservative Progressive Party. This party emerged as a conservative opposition to the Liberals and won the 1924 election. It later changed its name to the United Newfoundland Party.

By 1928, Squires had formed a new Liberal Party, which won the 1928 election. This second Squires government was again beset by corruption and scandal. The economic crisis caused by the Great Depression compounded these problems, and led to riots in 1932. Squires's government was toppled by the conservative United Newfoundland Party.

The UNP was elected on a promise to consider suspending responsible government. Responsible government was suspended in 1934, and a Commission of Government appointed by the British government took over the administration of Newfoundland. Newfoundland's status as an independent dominion came to an end, along with party politics.

Party politics returned to Newfoundland when it joined Canadian Confederation in 1949 and a new Liberal Party of Newfoundland and Labrador was formed under the leadership of Joseph Smallwood. The pre-Commission of Government Liberals, both in their early incarnation and their relaunching under Whiteway, tended to be identified more with poorer Newfoundlanders, while the Conservatives tended to be the party of the business establishment.

== List of leaders ==
Liberal Party of Newfoundland

- William Carson (1832–1843) (de facto)
- Patrick Morris (1832–1849) (de facto)
- Philip Little (1855–1858)
- John Kent (1858–1865)

Opposition Party

- Thomas Glen (1865–1869)

Anti-Confederation Party

- Charles Fox Bennett (1869–1874)

Opposition Party

- Joseph Ignatius Little (1874–1878)
- James Gervé Conroy (1878–1880)

New Party

- James Johnstone Rogerson (1882)
- Walter B. Grieve (1882–1883)

Liberal Party of Newfoundland

- Ambrose Shea (1885–1886)
- William Whiteway (1886–1897)
- Robert Bond (1897–1914)
- James M. Kent (1914–1916)
- William F. Lloyd (1916–1919)

Liberal Reform Party

- Richard Squires (1919–1923)
- William Warren (1923–1924)

Liberal-Progressive Party

- Albert Hickman (1924–1928)

Liberal Party of Newfoundland

- Richard Squires (1928–1932)
- F. Gordon Bradley (1932–1934)

== Election results ==
| Election | Leader | Votes | % | Seats | +/− | Position | Status |
|---|---|---|---|---|---|---|---|
| 1832 | —N/a (Note: William Carson and Patrick Morris served as de facto leaders during this period.) | 4,373 | 59.1 | 5 / 15 | ▲5 | ▲2nd | Opposition |
| 1836 | —N/a | —N/a | —N/a | 12 / 15 | ▲7 | ▲1st | Majority |
| 1837 | —N/a | —N/a | —N/a | 13 / 15 | ▲1 | 1st | Majority |
| 1842 | —N/a | —N/a | —N/a | 8 / 15 | ▼5 | 1st | Majority |
| 1848 | —N/a | —N/a | —N/a | 9 / 15 | ▲1 | 1st | Majority |
| 1852 | —N/a | —N/a | —N/a | 9 / 15 | Steady | 1st | Majority |
| 1855 | Philip F. Little | —N/a | —N/a | 18 / 30 | ▲9 | 1st | Majority |
| 1859 | John Kent | 7,249 | 69.9 | 18 / 30 | Steady | 1st | Majority |
| 1861 | John Kent | 5,184 | 92.5 | 14 / 30 | ▼4 | ▼2nd | Opposition |
| 1865 (Note: As an unorganized opposition party) | Thomas Glen | 7,008 | 40.8 | 8 / 30 | ▼6 | 2nd | Opposition |
| 1869 (Note: As the Anti-Confederation Party) | Charles F. Bennett | —N/a | —N/a | 21 / 30 | ▲13 | ▲1st | Majority |
| 1873 | Charles F. Bennett | —N/a | —N/a | 17 / 30 | ▼4 | 1st | Majority |
| 1874 | Charles F. Bennett | 8,260 | 44.3 | 13 / 30 | ▼4 | ▼2nd | Opposition |
| 1878 | James G. Conroy and Robert J. Pinsent | —N/a | —N/a | 10 / 30 | ▼3 | 2nd | Opposition |
| 1882 (Note: As the New Party) | James J. Rogerson and Walter B. Grieve | 11,298 | 28.6 | 5 / 33 | ▼5 | 2nd | Opposition |
| 1885 | Ambrose Shea | 11,983 | 39.0 | 13 / 36 | ▲8 | 2nd | Opposition |
| 1889 | William Whiteway | 37,123 | 60.9 | 28 / 36 | ▲15 | ▲1st | Majority |
| 1893 | William Whiteway | 39,516 | 50.7 | 23 / 36 | ▼5 | 1st | Majority |
| 1897 | William Whiteway | 36,062 | 42.4 | 13 / 36 | ▼10 | ▼2nd | Opposition |
| 1900 | Robert Bond | 51,657 | 62.7 | 32 / 36 | ▲19 | ▲1st | Majority |
| 1904 | Robert Bond | 52,636 | 60.0 | 30 / 36 | ▼2 | 1st | Majority |
| 1908 | Robert Bond | 48,341 | 50.2 | 18 / 36 | ▼12 | 1st | Tie |
| 1909 | Robert Bond | 48,200 | 47.1 | 10 / 36 | ▼8 | ▼2nd | Opposition |
| 1913 (Note: As the Liberal-Union Party in a coalition with the Fishermen's Protective Union) | Robert Bond and William Coaker | 61,362 | 54.3 | 15 / 36 | ▲5 | 2nd | Opposition |
| 1919 (Note: As the Liberal Reform Party in a coalition with the Fishermen's Protective Union) | Richard Squires and William Coaker | 70,207 | 59.6 | 24 / 36 | ▲9 | ▲1st | Majority |
| 1923 | Richard Squires and William Coaker | 65,063 | 51.5 | 23 / 36 | ▼1 | 1st | Majority |
| 1924 (Note: As the Liberal-Progressive Party) | Albert Hickman | 40,492 | 40.9 | 10 / 36 | ▼13 | ▼2nd | Opposition |
| 1928 (Note: In a coalition with the Fishermen's Protective Union) | Richard Squires and J. H. Scammell | 58,750 | 55.0 | 28 / 40 | ▲18 | ▲1st | Majority |
| 1932 | Richard Squires | 32,726 | 28.3 | 2 / 27 | ▼26 | ▼2nd | Opposition |

== See also ==
- Conservative parties in Newfoundland (pre-Confederation)
- List of political parties in Newfoundland and Labrador
- General elections in Newfoundland (pre-Confederation)
- Liberal Party of Newfoundland and Labrador
