= History of Newfoundland and Labrador =

Prior to European colonization, the lands encompassing present-day Newfoundland and Labrador were inhabited for millennia by different groups of Indigenous peoples. The first brief European contact with Newfoundland and Labrador came around 1000 AD when the Vikings briefly settled in L'Anse aux Meadows. In 1497, European explorers and fishermen from England, Portugal, Spain (mainly Basques), France and Holland began exploration. Fishing expeditions came seasonally; the first small permanent settlements appeared around 1630. Catholic-Protestant religious tensions were high but mellowed after 1860. The British colony voted against joining Canada in 1869 and became an independent dominion in 1907. After the economy collapsed in the 1930s, responsible government was suspended in 1934, and Newfoundland was governed through the Commission of Government. Prosperity and self-confidence returned during the Second World War, and after intense debate, the people voted to join Canada in 1948. Newfoundland joined Confederation in 1949.

Poverty and emigration have remained significant themes in Newfoundland history, despite efforts to modernize since entering Confederation. Over the second half of the 20th century, the historic cultural and political tensions between British Protestants and Irish Catholics faded, and a new spirit of a unified Newfoundland identity has recently emerged through songs and popular culture. During the 1990s, the province was severely impacted by the sudden collapse of the Atlantic cod fishing industry. The 2000s brought a renewed interest in the oil sector, which helped to revitalize the economy of the province.

== Early history ==
Human habitation in Newfoundland and Labrador can be traced back about 9000 years to the Maritime Archaic people. They were gradually displaced by people of the Dorset Culture—Thule and finally by the Innu and Inuit in Labrador and the Beothuks on Newfoundland.

=== European exploration ===
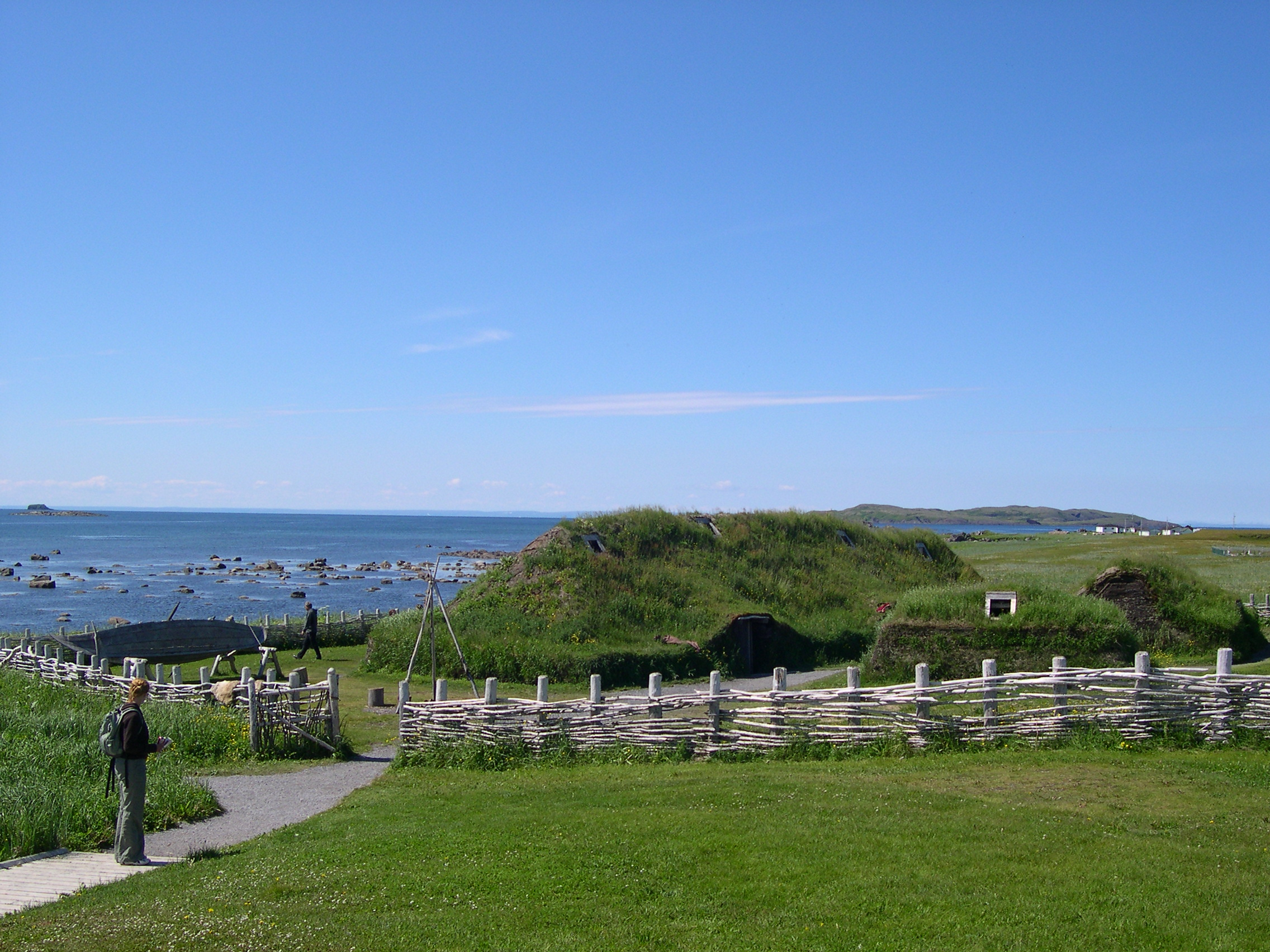
Recreated buildings at L'Anse aux Meadows, a Norse site that dates back to 1000

The first European contact with North America was that of the medieval Norse settlers arriving via Greenland. For several years after AD 1000 they lived in a village on the tip of the Great Northern Peninsula at L'Anse aux Meadows. Remnants and artifacts of the occupation is present at L'Anse aux Meadows, now a UNESCO World Heritage Site. The island was inhabited by the Beothuks (known as the Skræling in Greenlandic Norse) and later by the Mi'kmaq.

From the mid-to-late 15th Century, European explorers like Diogo de Teive, John Cabot, João Fernandes Lavrador, Gaspar Corte-Real, Jacques Cartier, and others began exploration.

=== European fishing expeditions ===
Fishing vessels with Basque, English, Portuguese, French, Dutch and Spanish crews started to make seasonal expeditions. Basque vessels had been fishing cod shoals off Newfoundland's coasts since the beginning of the 16th century, and their crews used the natural harbour at Placentia. French fishermen also began to use the area.

In 1578 Anthony Parkhurst provided a survey of the European fishery to the elder Richard Hakluyt, based on his observations of the fishery and Newfoundland's resources over the previous four years. Parkhurst claimed that, at that time, the English fleet consisted of 50 vessels (up from 30 vessels in just four years), the Spanish 100 vessels, the Portuguese 50 vessels, and the French / Bretons 150 (but mostly small). In addition, the Basques had 20-30 vessels solely engaged in whaling to obtain whale oil.

== Colony of Newfoundland ==
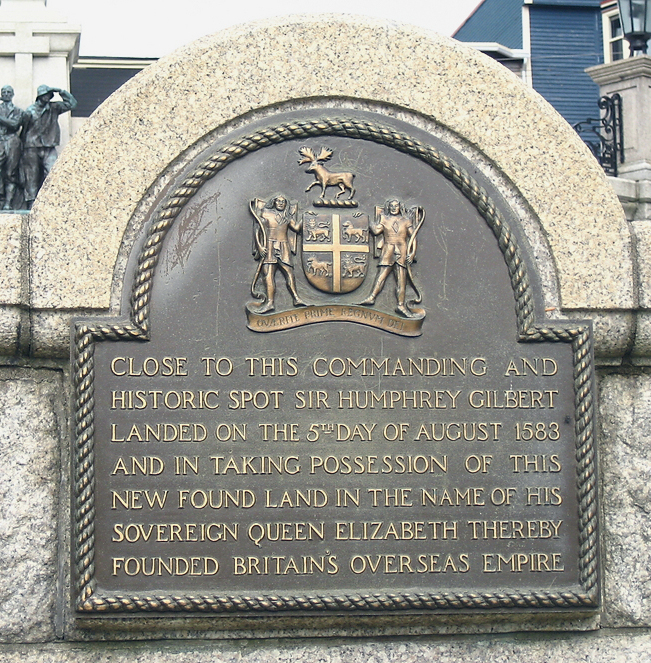
A plaque commemorating the landing of Humphrey Gilbert at St. John's in August 1583

John Cabot (1450–1499), commissioned by King Henry VII of England, landed on the northeast coast of North America in 1497. The exact location of his landing is unknown but the 500th anniversary of his landing was commemorated in Bonavista. The 1497 voyage has generated much debate among historians, with various points in Newfoundland, and Cape Breton Island in Nova Scotia, most often identified as the likely landing place.

The first Englishman to provide a detailed survey of the island and to advocate its settlement was Anthony Parkhurst, in 1577-8. Sir Humphrey Gilbert, provided with letters patent from Queen Elizabeth I, landed in St John's in August 1583, and formally took possession of the island.

=== 17th and 18th centuries ===
In 1610 John Guy of Bristol founded the London and Bristol Company for the Plantation of Newfoundland. He established a settlement at Cuper's Cove, being appointed governor. Excavation of the site since 1995 has revealed that it was occupied continuously from that point. Other settlements were Bristol's Hope, Renews, New Cambriol, South Falkland and Avalon which became a province in 1623. The first governor given jurisdiction over all of Newfoundland was Sir David Kirke in 1638.

From the 1770s to the late 19th century, Moravian missionaries, Hudson's Bay Company agents, and other pioneer settlers along central Labrador's coastline learned to adapt to its rocky terrain, brutal winters, and its thin soil and scant sunshine. To maintain good health, to avoid the monotony of dried, salted, and tinned foods, and to reduce reliance on expensive imported food, they created gardens and succeeded after much experimentation in growing hardy vegetables and even some fragile crops.

==== Fishing ====
Explorers soon realized that the waters around Newfoundland had the best fishing in the North Atlantic. By 1620, 300 fishing boats worked the Grand Banks, employing some 10,000 sailors; many were French or Basques from Spain. They dried and salted the cod on the coast and sold it to Spain and Portugal. Heavy investment by Sir George Calvert, 1st Baron Baltimore, in the 1620s in wharves, warehouses, and fishing stations failed to pay off. French raids hurt the business, and the weather was terrible, so he redirected his attention to his other colony in Maryland. After Calvert left, small-scale entrepreneurs such as Sir David Kirke made good use of the facilities. Kirke became the first governor in 1639. A triangular trade with New England, the West Indies, and Europe gave Newfoundland an important economic role. By the 1670s there were 1,700 permanent residents and another 4,500 in the summer months.

Newfoundland cod formed one leg of a triangular trade that sent cod to Spain and the Mediterranean, and wine, fruit, olive oil, and cork to England. Dutch ships were especially active during the time between 1620–1660 in what was called the "sack trade". A ship of 250 tons could earn 14% profit on the Newfoundland to Spain leg, and about the same on goods it then took from Spain to England. The journey across the Atlantic was stormy and risky; the risk was spread mostly by selling shares.

Before 1700 the "admiral" system provided the government. The first captain arriving in a particular bay was in charge of allocating suitable shoreline sites for curing fish. The system faded away after 1700. Fishing-boat captains competed to arrive first from Europe in an attempt to become the admiral; soon merchants left crewmen behind at the prime shoreline locations to lay claim to the sites. This led to "bye-boat" fishing: local, small-boat crews fished certain areas in the summer, claimed a strip of land as their own, and sold their catches to the migratory fishermen. Bye-boat fishing thus became dominant, giving the island a semi-permanent population, and proved more profitable than migratory fishing.

The fishing admirals system ended in 1729 when the Royal Navy sent in its officers to govern during the fishing season.

=== International disputes ===
In 1655, France appointed a governor at Plaisance, as Placentia was known in French, thus starting the French colonization of Newfoundland. In 1697, during the devastating Avalon Peninsula Campaign, Pierre Le Moyne d'Iberville almost claimed the English settlements for New France. However, the French failed to defend their conquest of the English portion of the island. The French colonization period lasted until the conclusion of the War of the Spanish Succession in 1713. In the Treaty of Utrecht, France ceded its claims to Newfoundland to the British (as well as its claims to the shores of Hudson Bay). The French possessions in Acadia were also yielded to Britain. Afterward, under the supervision of the last French governor, the French population of Plaisance moved to Île Royale (now Cape Breton Island), part of Acadia which remained then under French control.

In the Treaty of Utrecht (1713), France acknowledged British ownership of the island. However, in the Seven Years' War (1756–63), control of Newfoundland became a major source of conflict between Britain, France and Spain who all pressed for a share in the valuable fishery there. Britain's victories around the globe led William Pitt to insist that no other power might have access to Newfoundland. In 1762, a French force landed in Newfoundland and initially succeeded in occupying eastern portions of the island, including the important port of St. John's. However, French ambitions of conquering the island ended in defeat at the Battle of Signal Hill. In 1796, during the French Revolutionary Wars, a Franco-Spanish expedition succeeded in raiding the coasts of Newfoundland and Labrador.

Since the Treaty of Utrecht (1713), French fishermen had had the right to land and cure fish on the western coast of the island, known as the "French Shore". They had a permanent base on nearby St. Pierre and Miquelon islands; the French gave up their rights in 1904. In 1783, the British signed the Treaty of Paris with the United States that gave American fishermen similar rights along the coast. These rights were reaffirmed by treaties in 1818, 1854, and 1871 and confirmed by arbitration in 1910.

=== 19th century ===
Newfoundland received a colonial assembly in 1832, which was and still is referred to as the House of Assembly, after a fight led by reformers William Carson, Patrick Morris and John Kent. Carson (1770–1843), a Scottish physician who had come to the island in 1808, called for the replacement of the system of arbitrary rule by naval commanders, seeking instead to have a resident governor and an elective legislature. His systematic agitation helped win London's recognition of Newfoundland as a colony (1824) and the grant of an elective house (1832). Carson was the reform leader in the House of Assembly (1834–1843, speaker 1837–1841). He served on the Executive Council (1842–1843).

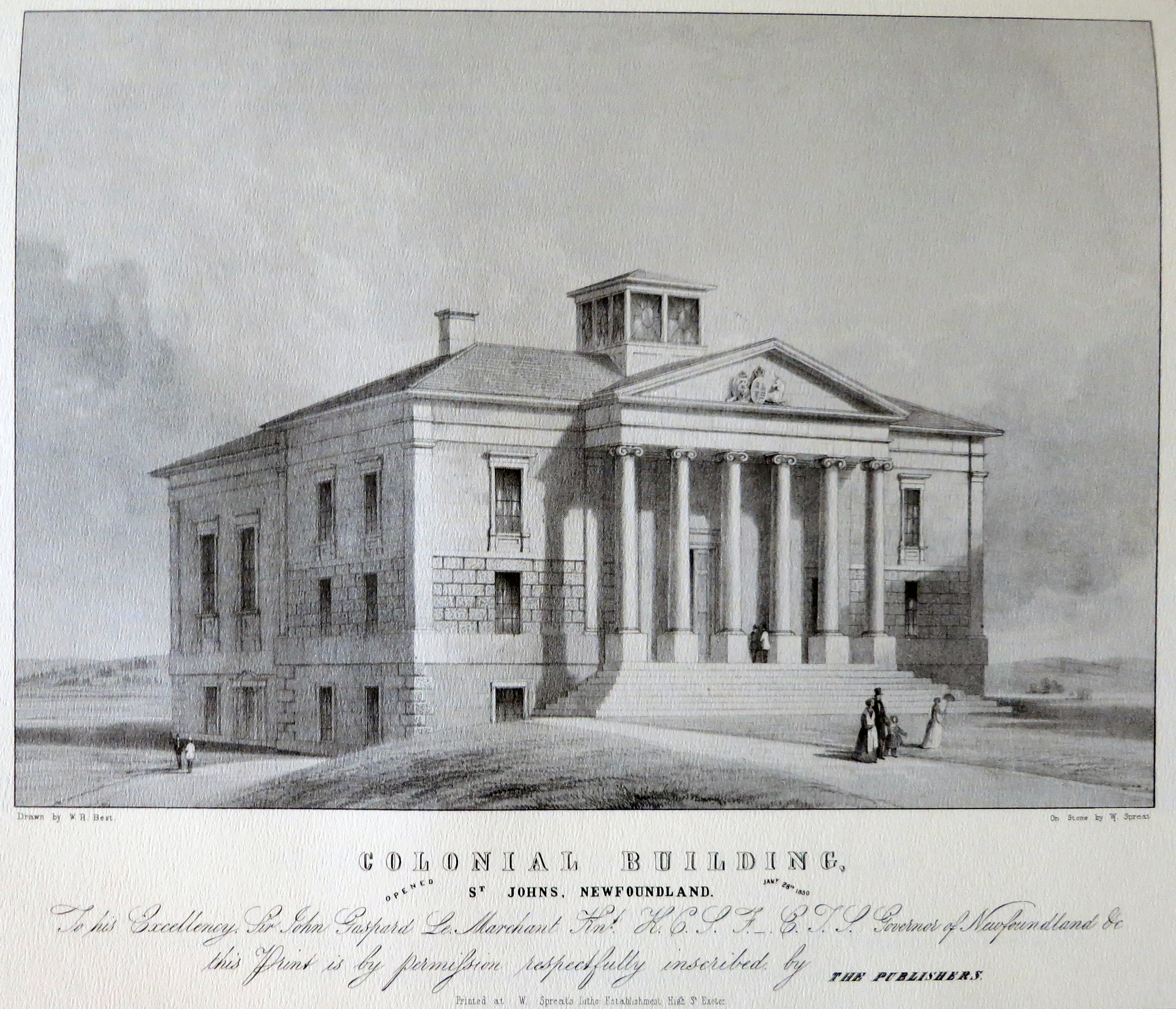
Depiction of the Colonial Building in 1851. The building housed Newfoundland's House of Assembly from 1850 to 1959.

This was changed back after some agitation in 1848 to two separate chambers. After this, a movement for responsible government began. Nova Scotia and the Province of Canada had obtained responsible government in 1848 (whereby the assembly had the final word, not the royal governor), and Newfoundland followed in 1855. Self-government was now a reality. The Liberal Party, based on the Irish Catholic vote, alternated with the Conservatives, with its base among the merchant class and Protestants. With a prosperous population of 120,000, Newfoundlanders decided to pass in 1869 on joining Confederation.

In 1861 the Protestant governor dismissed the Catholic Liberals from office, and the ensuing election was marked by riot and disorder, with both bishop Edward Feild of Newfoundland and Catholic bishop Thomas Mullock taking partisan stances. The Protestants narrowly elected Hugh Hoyles as the Conservative premier. Hoyles suddenly reversed his long record of militant Protestant activism and worked to defuse tensions. He shared patronage and power with the Catholics; all jobs and patronage were split between the various religious bodies on a per capita basis. This 'denominational compromise' was further extended to education when all religious schools were put on the basis which the Catholics had enjoyed since the 1840s. Alone in North America Newfoundland had a state-funded system of denominational schools. The compromise worked and politics ceased to be about religion and became concerned with purely political and economic issues.

By the 1890s St John's was no longer regarded in England as akin to Belfast, and Blackwood's Magazine was using developments there as an argument for Home Rule for Ireland. Newfoundland had rejected Confederation with Canada in the 1869 general election. Sir Robert Bond (1857–1927) was a Newfoundland nationalist who insisted upon the colony's equality of status with Canada, and opposed joining Confederation. Bond promoted the completion of a railway across the island (started in 1881) because it would open access to valuable minerals and timber and reduce the almost total dependence on the cod fisheries. He advocated closer economic ties with the United States, and distrusted London for ignoring the island's viewpoint on the controversial issue of allowing French fisherman to process lobsters on the French Coast, and for blocking a trade deal with the U.S. Bond became Liberal Party leader in 1899 and premier in 1900.

==== Economy ====
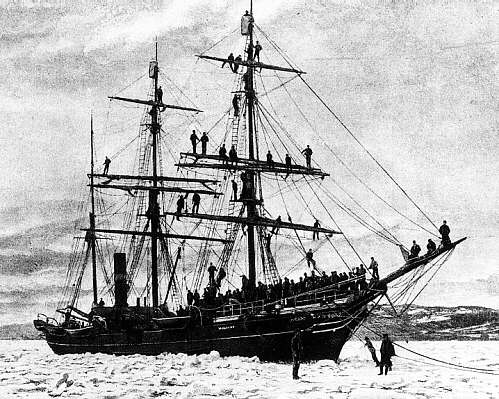
The steamship Vanguard with seal hunters north of the Labrador Sea in 1884

In the 1850s newly formed local banks became a source of credit, replacing the haphazard system of credit from local merchants. Prosperity brought immigration, especially Catholics from Ireland who soon composed 40 per cent of the residents. Small-scale seasonal farming became widespread, and mines began to exploit abundant reserves of lead, copper, zinc, iron, and coal. Railways were opened in the 1880s, with the link from St. John's to Port aux Basques open in 1898. In 1895 Newfoundland again rejected the possibility of joining Canada.

Seal hunting off the coast of Labrador, for the fur, became a small specialty in the late 18th century. It began with nets and traps, which gave way to the versatility of sail-driven ships around 1800. Sailing ships gave way to the greater range, power, and reliability of steam-driven vessels after 1863.

==== Rejection of Canada ====
Newfoundland did not join Canada in the 19th century primarily because its people and leaders believed it was better off remaining a separate British colony. This sentiment was rooted in a combination of economic, political, and cultural factors that made Confederation seem unappealing and even detrimental at the time. Newfoundland's economy was heavily reliant on the cod and seal fisheries, with its exports directed toward Europe, particularly Great Britain, and the United States. Canada was a rival. Many of its elite merchants feared that joining Canada, which had its own protective tariffs, would harm their profitable overseas trade. They worried that Canadian tariffs would make their goods more expensive and less competitive. Unlike the other colonies that joined Confederation, Newfoundland did not fear a potential invasion from the United States, as its isolated island location and protection from the Royal Navy made such a threat seem distant. Furthermore, there was no interest in westward expansion or the transcontinental railway project that was a key part of the Canadian plan.

Newfoundlanders had a strong sense of a distinct cultural and political identity. They had been a separate British colony for centuries, and in 1855 they had achieved responsible government, giving them control over their own affairs. Many felt a fierce loyalty to the British Empire and saw giving up their independence for a union with the mainland as a threat to their autonomy. The debate over joining Canada came to a head in the 1869 general election, which was fought on the issue of Confederation. The anti-Confederation side, led by Charles Fox Bennett, warned of higher taxes and potential conscription into Canadian wars. They appealed to local patriotism and the fear of losing control over their own resources. The result was a landslide victory for the anti-Confederates, which decisively ended the discussion for the rest of the century. It would take an economic collapse in the 1930s and a new world order after World War II for the idea of joining Canada to gain enough support to pass in a referendum in 1949.

=== 20th century ===
By the beginning of the 20th century the population of the capital of St John's had doubled from 15,000 in 1835 to 29,594 in 1901. The religious census of 1901 reported: Roman Catholics, 76,000; Church of England, 73,000; Methodists, 61,000; Presbyterians, 1,200; Congregationalists, 1,000; Salvationists, 6,600; Moravians, Baptists and others, 1,600.

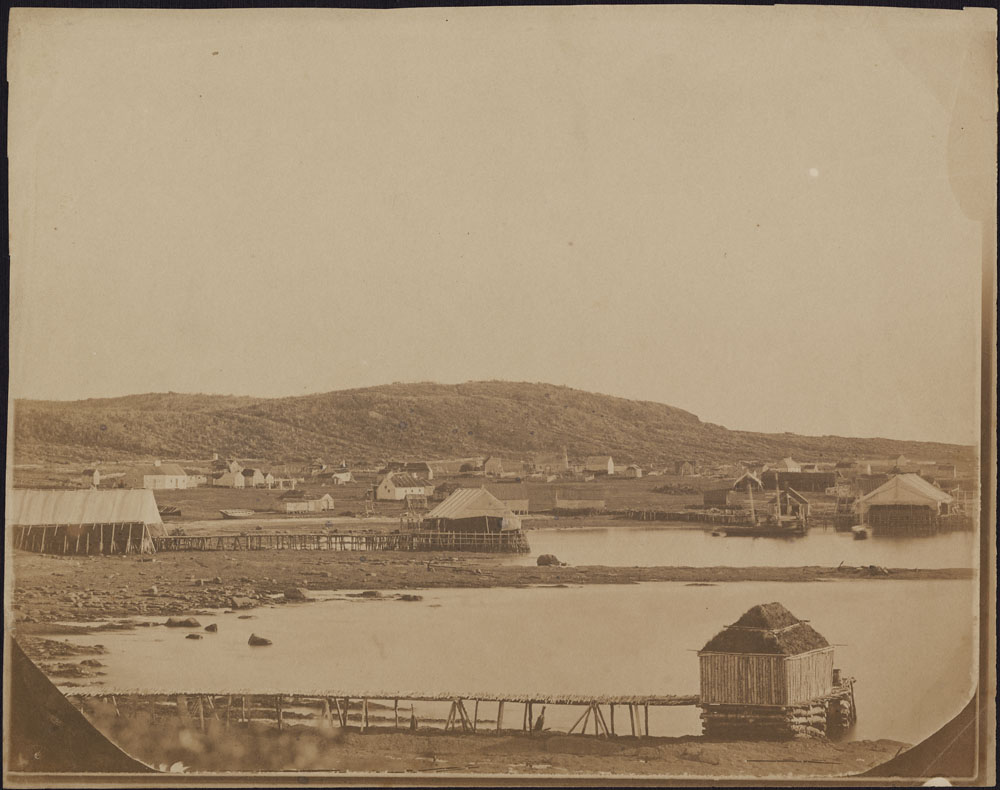
French fishing stations on the French Shore in 1859. France retained the right to fish there until 1904, when they relinquished their right to do so as a part of the Entente Cordiale.

As part of the Anglo-French Entente Cordiale of 1904, France abandoned the "French Shore", or the west coast of the island, to which it had had rights since the Peace of Utrecht of 1713. Bond had helped negotiate the end of all French fishing rights, and was reelected in a landslide. Possession of Labrador was disputed by Quebec and Newfoundland until 1927, when the Judicial Committee of the Privy Council, the highest court in the British Empire, demarcated the western boundary, enlarged Labrador's land area, and confirmed Newfoundland's title to it.

The public education budget for Newfoundland in 1905 was $196,000, which covered 783 elementary schools and academies with 35,204 students. About 25% of the population, chiefly the older folk, were illiterate. The school system was denominational until the 1990s, with each church receiving grants in proportion to numerical strength.

== Dominion of Newfoundland ==
Newfoundland remained a colony until acquiring dominion status on 26 September 1907, along with New Zealand. It successfully negotiated a trade agreement with the United States but the British government blocked it after objections from Canada. The Dominion of Newfoundland reached its golden age under Prime Minister Sir Robert Bond of the Liberal Party.

However, his efforts to restrict the rights of American fishermen failed, which led to his party to be badly defeated in 1909. Bond formed a coalition with the new Fishermen's Protective Union (FPU), led by William Coaker (1871–1938). Founded in 1908, the FPU worked to increase the incomes of fishermen by breaking the merchants' monopoly on the purchase and export of fish and the retailing of supplies, and tried to revitalize the fishery through state intervention. At its peak, it had more than 21,000 members in 206 councils across the island; more than half of Newfoundland's fishers. It appealed to Protestants and was opposed by Catholics. The FPU morphed into a political party in 1912, the Fisherman's Union party.

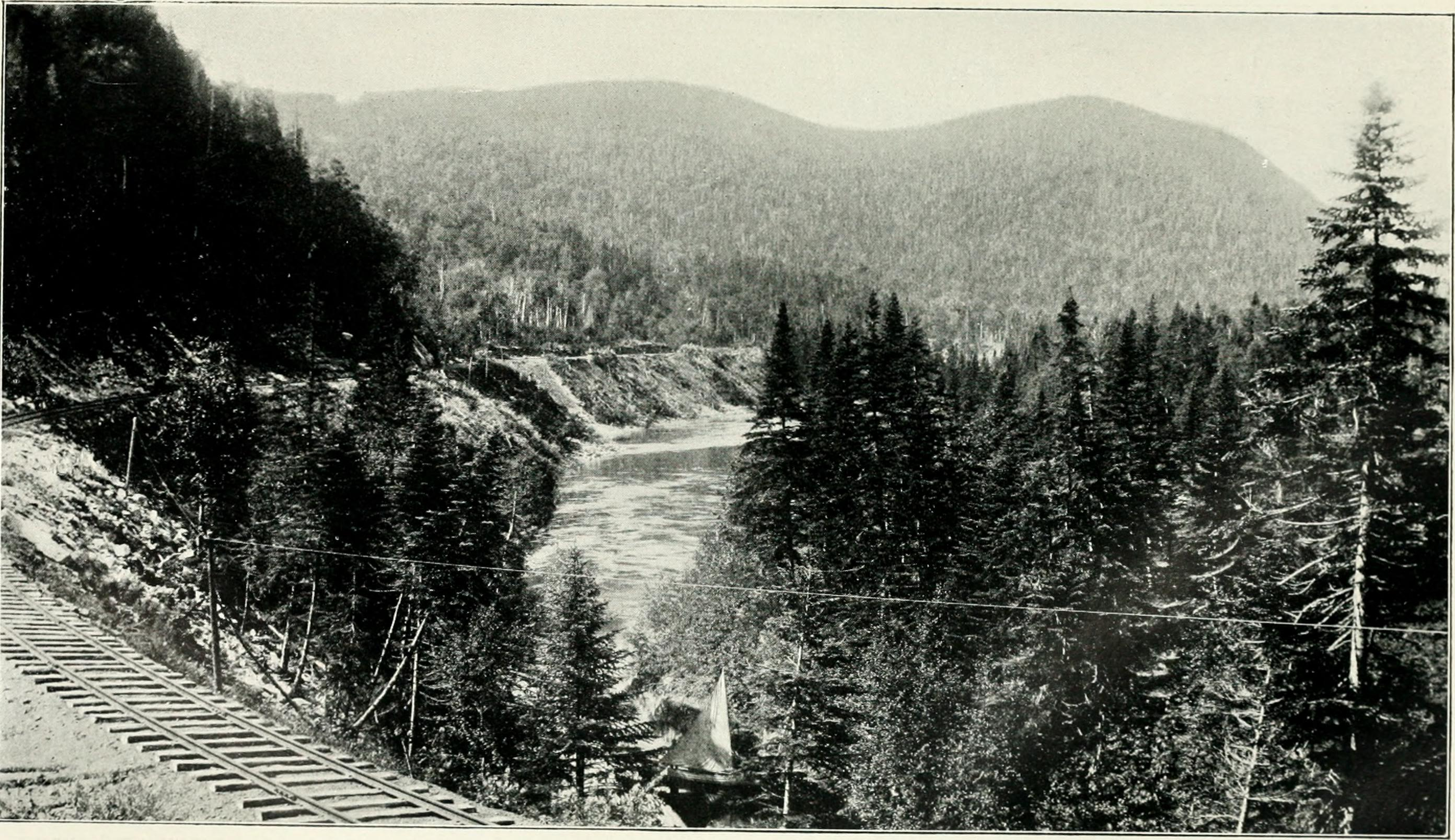
Railway track along the Humber River in 1911

Bond was succeeded as premier by Edward Morris (1859–1935), a prominent Catholic and founder of the new People's Party. Morris began a grandiose program of building branch railways and adeptly handled the arbitration at the Hague tribunal on American fishing rights. He introduced old-age pensions and increased investment in education and rural infrastructure. In the prosperous and peaceful year of 1913 he was reelected. As a result of a wartime crisis over conscription, and the decline of his popularity due to accusations of wartime profiteering and conflict of interest, Morris set up an all-party war government in 1917 to oversee the duration of the war. He retired in 1917, moved to London, and was given a peerage as first Baron Morris, the only Newfoundlander ever so honored.

=== First World War ===
The First World War was supported with near unanimity in Newfoundland. Recruiting was brisk, with 6,240 men joining the Newfoundland Regiment for overseas duty, 1,966 joining the Royal Navy, 491 joined the Forestry Corps (which did lumberjack work at home), plus another 3,300 men joined Canadian units, and 40 women became war nurses. Without convening the legislature, Premier Morris and the royal governor, Sir Walter Davidson created the Newfoundland Patriotic Association, a non-partisan body involving both citizens and politicians, to supervise the war effort until 1917. With inflation soaring and corruption rampant, with the prohibition of liquor in effect and fears of conscription apparent, the Association gave way to an all-party National Government. The conscription issue was not as intense as in Canada, but it weakened the Fisherman's Union party, as its leaders supported conscription and most members opposed it. The Fisherman's party then merged into the Liberal-Unionist Party and faded away as an independent force.

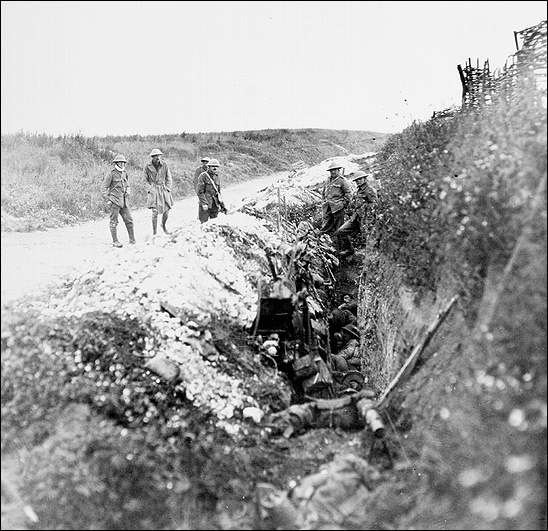
Soldiers of the Newfoundland Regiment during the Battle of the Somme, July 1916

During the great Battle of the Somme in France in 1916, the British assaulted the German trenches near Beaumont Hamel. The 800-man Royal Newfoundland Regiment attacked as part of a British brigade. Most of the Newfoundlanders were killed or wounded without anyone in the regiment having fired a shot. The state, church, and press romanticized the sacrifice Newfoundlanders had made in the war effort through ceremonies, war literature, and memorials, the most important of which was the Beaumont Hamel Memorial Park, which opened in France in 1925. The story of the heroic sacrifice of the regiment in 1916 served as a cultural inspiration.

=== 1919–1934 ===
In 1919, the FPU joined with the Liberal Party of Newfoundland led by Richard Squires to form the Liberal Reform Party. The Liberal-Union coalition won 24 of 36 seats in the 1919 general election with half of the coalition's seats being won by Union candidates.

The 1920 Education Act set up a Department of Education, to oversee all state schools, including teacher training and certification. It provided for four grades of certificated teachers. There was also a category of other "ungraded" teachers, who were unqualified and employed on a temporary basis.

International capital was increasingly attracted by the island's natural resources. A Canadian firm opened iron mines in 1895 on Bell Island in Conception Bay. Paper mills were built at Grand Falls by the Anglo-Newfoundland Development Company, a British firm, in 1909. British entrepreneurs set up a paper mill at Corner Brook in 1925 while the Anglo-Newfoundland Development Company opened a lead-zinc mine on the Buchans River in 1927. In 1927, Britain awarded the vast, almost uninhabited hinterland of Labrador to Newfoundland rather than to Canada, adding potentially valuable new forest, hydroelectric, and mineral resources.

Politically the years from 1916 to 1925 were turbulent, as six successive governments failed, widespread corruption was uncovered, and the postwar boom ended in economic stagnation. Labour unions were active, as Joey Smallwood (1900–1991) founded the Newfoundland Federation of Labour in the early 1920s.

== Newfoundland Commission of Government ==
Newfoundland's economic crash in the Great Depression, coupled with a profound distrust of politicians, led to the abandonment of self-government. Newfoundland remains the only nation that ever voluntarily relinquished democracy.

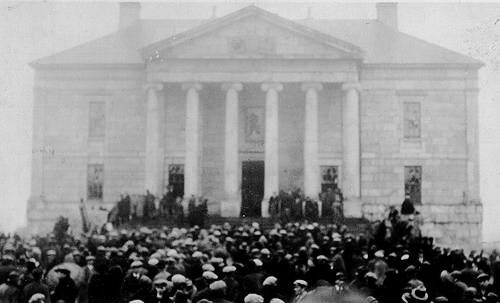
The 1932 Colonial Building riot. The riot was prompted by the Great Depression and charges of corruption within the government.

=== Economic collapse ===
Newfoundland's economy collapsed in the Great Depression, as prices plunged for fish, its main export. The population was 290,000, and the people and merchants were out of money. Since there was relatively little subsistence farming, people depended heavily on the meager supply of government relief, and as much emergency help with their friends, neighbors, and relatives could spare. There were no reports of starvation, but malnutrition was widespread.

The depression was hard on both the fishermen and merchants in Battle Harbour, Labrador, and they almost came to blows. The Baine, Johnston firm had to cut winter credit, whereupon poorer fishermen threatened the company with violence. Government relief payments were too scanty.

=== Political collapse ===
Baron Amulree, one of the three commissioners of the Newfoundland Royal Commission. Convened in 1933, the commission eventually recommended that the government be suspended for a period of time. The government was bankrupt. It had borrowed heavily to construct and maintain a trans-island railway and to finance the country's regiment in the World War. By 1933, the public debt was over $100 million compared to a nominal national income of about $30 million. Interest payments on the debt absorbed 63% of government revenue and the budget deficit was $3.5 million or over 10 per cent of the island's GDP. There was no more credit; a short-lived plan to sell Labrador to Canada fell through. The Richard Squires government was ineffective and when Squires was arrested for bribery in 1932 he fell from power.

A royal commission under Lord Amulree examined the causes of the financial disaster and concluded:

The twelve years 1920–1932, during none of which was the budget balanced, were characterized by an outflow of public funds on a scale as ruinous as it was unprecedented, fostered by a continuous stream of willing lenders. A new era of industrial expansion, easy money, and profitable contact with the American continent was looked for and was deemed in part to having arrived. In the prevailing optimism, the resources of the Exchequer were believed to be limitless. The public debt of the island, accumulated over a century, was in twelve years more than doubled; its assets dissipated by improvident administration; the people misled into the acceptance of false standards, and the country sunk in waste and extravagance. The onset of the world depression found the island with no reserves, its primary industry neglected and its credit exhausted. At the first wind of adversity, its elaborate pretensions collapsed like a house of cards. The glowing visions of a new Utopia were dispelled with cruel suddenness by the cold realities of national insolvency, and today a disillusioned and bewildered people, deprived in many parts of the country of all hopes of earning a livelihood, are haunted by the grim specters of pauperism and starvation.

In return for British financial assistance, the newly elected government of Frederick Alderdice agreed to the appointment by London of a three-member royal commission, including British, Canadian, and Newfoundland nominees. The Newfoundland Royal Commission, chaired by Lord Amulree, recommended that Britain "assume general responsibility" for Newfoundland's finances. Newfoundland would give up self-government in favour of administration by an appointed governor and a six-member appointed Commission of Government, having both executive and legislative authority. The solution was designed to provide "a rest from politics" and a government free of corruption. The legislature accepted the deal, formalized when the British Parliament passed the Newfoundland Act, 1933. In 1934, the Commission of Government took control; its six appointed commissioners, who administered the country without elections. It lasted until 1949. "On 16 February 1934, Premier Alderdice signed the papers that surrendered Newfoundland's dominion status," reports historian Sean Cadigan.

=== Second World War ===
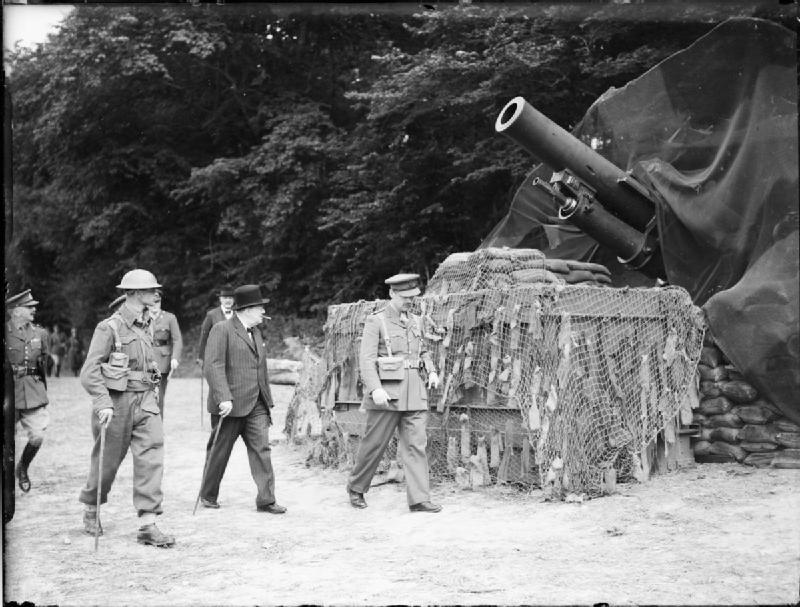
The 57th (Newfoundland) Heavy Regiment in 1940. The British Royal Artillery raised several regiments from Newfoundland during the Second World War

In 1940 Winston Churchill and Franklin D. Roosevelt agreed to an exchange of American destroyers for access to British naval bases in the Atlantic, including Newfoundland. The result was sudden prosperity as American money flooded the island, where 25% of the people had recently been on relief. Some 20,000 men were employed in building military bases. The local and British governments persuaded the United States to keep wages low so as to not destroy the labor force for fishing, logging and other local industries, but the cost of living—already higher than in Canada or the United States—rose 58% between 1938 and 1945. Even more influential was the sudden impact of a large modern American population on a traditional society. American ideas regarding food, hygiene (and indoor plumbing), entertainment, clothing, living standards and pay scales swept the island. As during the First World War, Newfoundland became vital to the Battle of the Atlantic. Each month dozens of naval ships protecting convoys stopped at St. John's.

=== Postwar ===
America retained and expanded its Newfoundland bases after the war, because the island was on the shortest Great Circle air route between the Soviet Union and the East Coast of the United States, and Soviet bombers carrying nuclear weapons were the largest threat to American cities. Its five large American bases—four Air Force and one Navy—were important to Newfoundland's economy, and many Americans intermarried with native residents.

Fears of a permanent American presence in Newfoundland caused the Canadian government to attempt to persuade the island to join Confederation. This was not primarily due to economic reasons. In the 1940s Newfoundland was Canada's eighth-largest trading partner. The island primarily traded with Britain and the United States, especially the "Boston states" of New England. Canada saw some value in Newfoundland's fisheries, raw materials, Labrador's hydroelectric potential, and 300,000 people of English and Irish descent, and expected that its location would remain important to trans-Atlantic aviation.

Canada's primary interest, however, was from the fear that an independent Newfoundland would join the United States due to their economic and military ties. With Newfoundland, the United States would block the Gulf of St. Lawrence and leave only about 500 km of Nova Scotia coastline open to the Atlantic. Because America already bordered Canada on the south and controlled all but about 600 km of British Columbia's western boundary, Canada would be almost surrounded on three sides. Both Britain and Canada wished to prevent this. Newfoundlanders had regained their prosperity and their self-confidence, but were uncertain whether they should be an independent nation with close ties to the United States, or become part of Canada.

==== Referendum ====
As soon as prosperity returned during the war, agitation began to end the Commission. Newfoundland, with a population of 313,000 (plus 5,200 in Labrador), seemed too small to be independent. Joey Smallwood was a well-known radio personality, writer, organizer, and nationalist who had long criticized British rule. In 1945 London announced that a Newfoundland National Convention would be elected to advise on what constitutional choices should to be voted on by referendum. Union with the United States was a possibility, but Britain rejected the option and offered instead two options, return to dominion status or continuation of the unpopular Commission. Canada cooperated with Britain to ensure that the option of closer ties with America was not on the referendum.

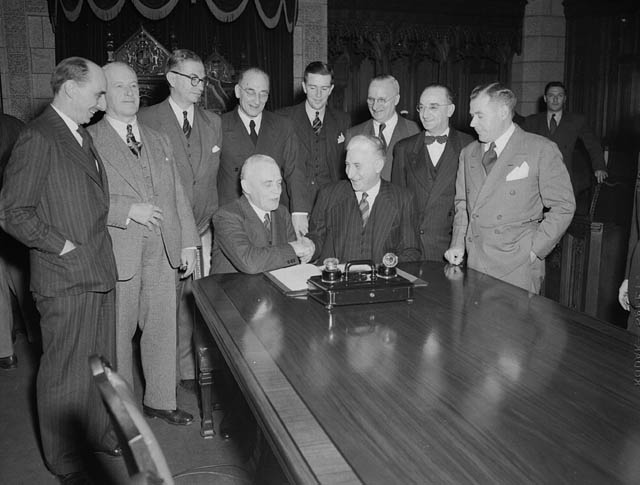
Canadian prime minister Louis St. Laurent shakes hands with Newfoundland delegate Albert Walsh, after delegates from both sides signed the agreement to admit Newfoundland into Canadian Confederation

Canada issued an invitation to join it on generous financial terms. Smallwood was elected to the convention where he became the leading proponent of Confederation with Canada, insisting, "Today we are more disposed to feel that our very manhood, our very creation by God, entitles us to standards of life no lower than our brothers on the mainland." Displaying a mastery of propaganda technique, courage and ruthlessness, he succeeded in having the Canada option on the referendum. His main opponents were Peter John Cashin and Chesley Crosbie. Cashin, a former finance minister, led the Responsible Government League, warning against cheap Canadian imports and the high Canadian income tax. Crosbie, a leader of the fishing industry, led the Party for Economic Union with the United States, seeking responsible government first, to be followed by closer ties with the United States, which could be a major source of capital.

Smallwood's side was victorious in a referendum and a runoff in June–July 1948, as the choice of joining Canada defeated becoming an independent dominion, 78,323 (52.3%) to 71,334 (47.7%). A strong rural vote in favour of Canada exceeded the pro-independence vote in St. John's. The Irish Catholics in the city desired independence in order to protect their parochial schools, leading to a Protestant backlash in rural areas. The promise of cash family allowances from Canada proved decisive.

Not everyone was satisfied with the results, however. Cashin, an outspoken anti-Confederate, questioned the validity of the votes. He claimed that it was the "unholy union between London and Ottawa" that brought about Confederation.

== Post-Confederation history ==
After ICBMs replaced the bomber threat in the late 1950s, the American Air Force bases closed by the early 1960s and Naval Station Argentia in the 1980s. In 1959, a local controversy arose when the provincial government pressured the Moravian Church to abandon its mission station at Hebron, Labrador, resulting in the relocation southward of the area's Inuit population, who had lived there since the mission was established in 1831.

=== Mid- to late-20th century economy ===
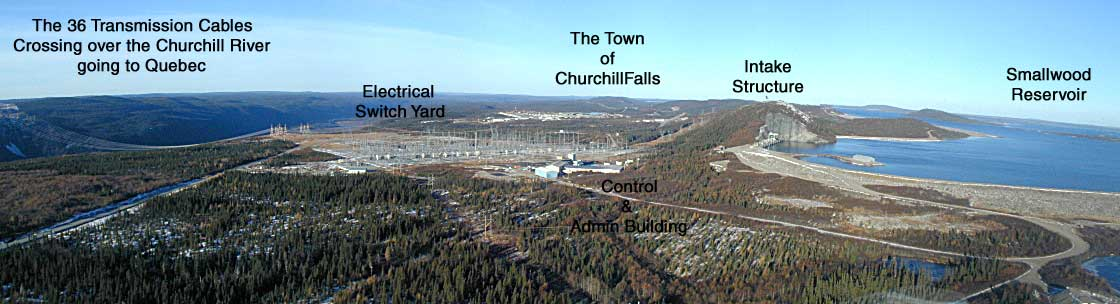
Diagram of Churchill Falls Generating Station and the surrounding area

Considerable attention was paid to the infrastructure for Labrador, especially building railway systems to transport the minerals and raw materials from Labrador to Quebec, and an electricity grid. In the 1960s, the province developed the Churchill Falls hydro-electric facility in order to sell electricity to the United States. An agreement with Quebec was required to secure permission to transport the electricity across Quebec territory. Quebec drove a hard bargain with Newfoundland, resulting in a 75-year deal that Newfoundlanders now believe to be unfair to the province because of the low and unchangeable rate that it receives for the electricity. In addition to energy production, iron mining did not begin in Labrador until the 1950s. By 1990, the Quebec-Labrador area had become an important supplier of iron ore to the United States.

In the late 1980s, the federal government, along with its Crown corporation Petro-Canada and other private sector petroleum exploration companies, committed to developing the oil and gas resources of the Hibernia oil field on the northeast portion of the Grand Banks. Throughout the mid-1990s, thousands of Newfoundlanders were employed on offshore exploration platforms, as well as in the construction of the Hibernia Gravity Base Structure (GBS) and Hibernia topsides.

==== Fishing ====
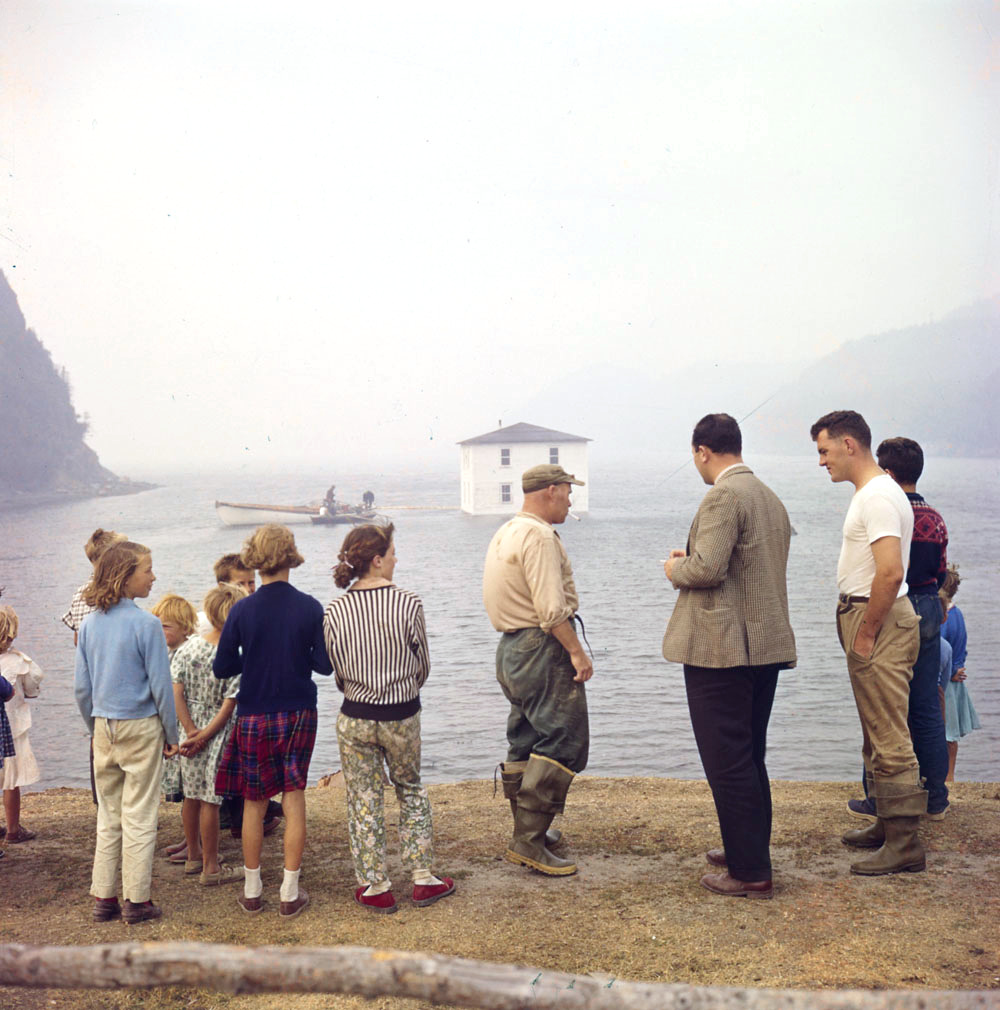
A home being relocated in 1961. Government-sponsored programs were launched to resettle isolated communities from the 1960s to 1970s.

Around 1900 the average annual export of dried cod-fish over a term of years was about 120,000,000 kilograms, with a value between five and six million dollars. The cod were caught on the shores of the island, along the Labrador coast and especially on "the Banks." These Banks stretch for about 300 m. in a south-east direction towards the centre of the North Atlantic; depths range from 15 to 80 fathoms (25–150 meters). In 1901, 28% of the labor force was engaged in the catching and curing of fish, compared to 31% in 1857. They used 1550 small boats, with a tonnage of 54,500. The cod were taken by the hook-and-line, the seine, the cod-net or gill-net, the cod-trap and the bultow; Brazil and Spain were the largest customers. Cod, supplemented by herring and lobster, remained an economic mainstay until the late 20th century.

After 1945, the fishing economy was transformed from a predominantly labor-intensive inshore, household-based, saltfish-producing enterprise into an industrialized economy dominated by vertically integrated frozen fish companies. These efficient companies needed fewer workers, so about 300 fishing villages, or outports, were abandoned by their residents between 1954 and 1975 as part of a Canadian government-sponsored program known as the Resettlement. Some areas lost 20% of their population, and enrollment in schools dropped even more.

In the 1960s some 2 billion pounds of cod were harvested annually from the Grand Bank off Newfoundland, the world's largest source of fish. Then disaster hit. The northern cod practically vanished—they were reduced to 1% of their historic spawning biomass. In 1992, the cod fishery was shut down by the Canadian government; cod fishing as a way of life came to an end for 19,000 workers after a 500-year history as a main industry.

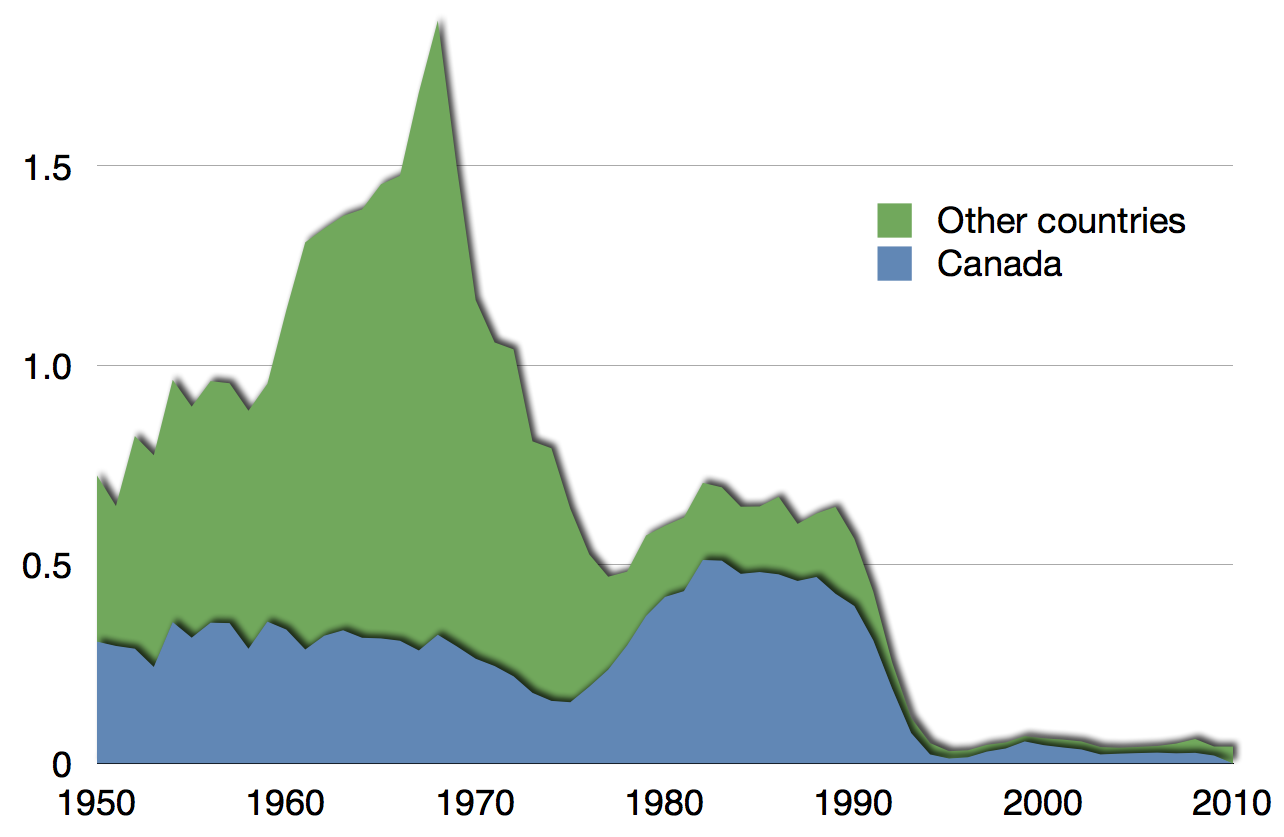
Capture of Atlantic cod in million tonnes, with Canadian data presented separately. After cod stocks were depleted, the Canadian government announced a moratorium on cod fishing in 1992; disrupting the economy of Newfoundland.

However, the situation changed in the 1990s as a result of the collapse of the Atlantic northwest cod fishery. In 1992, the federal government declared a moratorium on the Atlantic cod fishery, because of severely declining catches in the late 1980s. The consequences of this decision reverberated throughout the provincial economy of Newfoundland in the 1990s, particularly as once-vibrant rural communities faced a sudden exodus. The economic impact of the closure of the Atlantic cod fishery on Newfoundland has been compared to the effect of closing every manufacturing plant in Ontario. The cod fishery which had provided Newfoundlanders on the south and east coasts with a livelihood for over 200 years was gone, although the federal government helped fishermen and fish plant workers make the adjustment with a multibillion-dollar program named "The Atlantic Groundfish Strategy" (TAGS).

==== Tourism ====
Starting in the 1990s tourism was promoted by many local development, heritage and archaeological organisations as a way of restoring the economic base of many outports and villages. Limited, short-term funding for some tourism-related projects came from government programs designed to maintain morale and find a new economic role.

==== Whale hunting ====
Whale hunting became an important industry around 1900. At first slow whales were caught by men hurling harpoons from small open boats. Mechanization copied from Norway brought in cannon-fired harpoons, strong cables, and steam winches mounted on maneuverable, steam-powered catcher boats. They made possible the targeting of large and fast-swimming whale species that were taken to shore-based stations for processing. The invention of the harpoon cannon in the 1860s and the westward expansion of the Scandinavian industry that resulted from the rapid depletion of their local stocks resulted in the emergence of the modern whaling industry off Newfoundland and Labrador. The industry was highly cyclical, with well-defined catch peaks in 1903–05, 1925–30, 1945–51, and 1966–72, after which world-wide bans shut it down. When Newfoundland joined Canada in 1949, it relinquished jurisdiction over its fisheries to Ottawa; the Supreme Court ruled in 1983 that the federal government also has jurisdiction over offshore oil drilling.

=== Politics in the mid- to late-20th century ===
Neary (1980) identifies three postwar political eras, each marked by a dramatic opening event. A first period began with Confederation, with Smallwood in power. A second period of politics started with the Progressive Conservative victory in the federal general election of 1957. A third period began with the sweeping Conservative victory in Newfoundland in the federal election of 1968. There was a common theme in each era, involving the continuing decline of the traditional, stable, subsistence, outport economy by the forces of urbanism and industrialism.

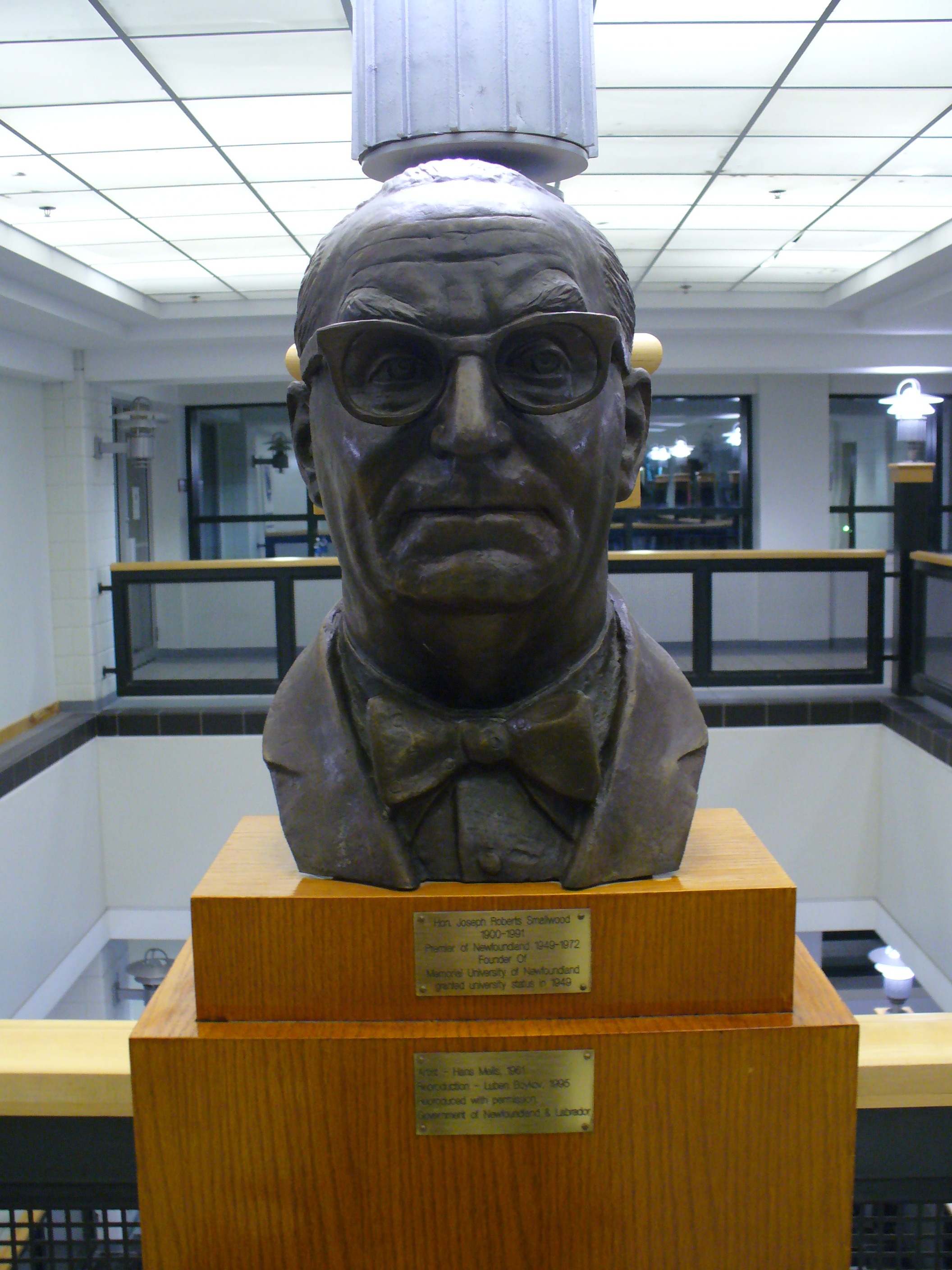
Bust of Joey Smallwood at Memorial University of Newfoundland. Smallwood was the first premier of Newfoundland, having served from 1949 to 1972.

Politics was dominated by the Liberal Party, led by Premier Smallwood, from Confederation until 1972. His main program was economic growth, and creating new jobs to encourage young people to stay in Newfoundland. Smallwood made major efforts to modernize the fishing industry, to create a new energy industry, and to attract factories. He vigorously promoted economic development through the Economic Development Plan of 1951, championed the welfare state (paid for by Ottawa), and attracted favorable attention across Canada. He emphasized modernisation of education and transportation in order to attract outsiders, such as German industrialists, because the local economic elite would not invest in industrial development. Smallwood dropped his youthful socialism and collaborated with bankers, and became hostile to the militant unions that sponsored numerous strikes. His efforts to promote industrialization were partially successful, with great success primarily in hydroelectricity, iron mining, and paper mills. Smallwood also upgraded the small Memorial University College in St John's, founded in 1925, to Memorial University of Newfoundland (MUN) in 1949, with free tuition and a cash stipend for students.

Smallwood's style was autocratic and highly personalized, as he totally controlled his party. Meanwhile, the demoralized anti-confederates became the provincial wing of the Progressive Conservative Party. An extension of the Trans-Canada Highway became the first paved road across the island in 1966. That year Smallwood's government heavily advertised a "Come Home" program to attract as tourists Newfoundland expatriates, such as war brides in the United States and those who had left for work. The goal was to demonstrate the changes during the Smallwood era in the province's economy and infrastructure.

In 1972, the Smallwood government was replaced by the Progressive Conservative administration of Frank Moores. In 1979, Brian Peckford, another Progressive Conservative, became Premier. During this time, Newfoundland was involved in a dispute with the federal government for control of offshore oil resources. In the end, the dispute was decided by compromise. In 1989, Clyde Wells and the Liberal Party returned to power ending 17 years of Conservative government.

The fishing crisis of the 1990s saw the already precarious economic base of the many towns further eroded. The situation was made worse by both federal and provincial pursuit of programs of economic liberalization that sought to limit the role of the state in economic and social affairs. As the effects of the crisis were felt, and established state supports were weakened, tourism was embraced by a growing body of local development and heritage organizations as a way of restoring the shattered economic base of many communities. Limited, short-term funding for some tourism-related projects was provided mostly from government programs, largely as a means of politically managing the structural adjustment that was being pursued.

In 1996, the former federal minister of fisheries, Brian Tobin, was successful in winning the leadership of the provincial Liberal Party following the retirement of premier Clyde Wells. Tobin rode the waves of economic good fortune as the downtrodden provincial economy was undergoing a fundamental shift, largely as a result of the oil and gas industry's financial stimulus, although the effects of this were mainly felt only in communities on the Avalon Peninsula. Good fortune also fell on Tobin following the discovery of a world class nickel deposit at Voisey's Bay, Labrador. Tobin committed to negotiating a better royalty deal for the province with private sector mining interests than previous governments had done with the Churchill Falls hydroelectric development deal in the 1970s. Following Tobin's return to federal politics in 2000, the provincial Liberal Party devolved into internal battling for the leadership, leaving its new leader, Roger Grimes, in a weakened position as premier.

=== 21st century ===
The pressure of the oil and gas industry to explore offshore in Atlantic Canada saw Newfoundland and Nova Scotia submit to a federal arbitration to decide on a disputed offshore boundary between the two provinces in the Laurentian Basin. The 2003 settlement rewrote an existing boundary in Newfoundland's favour, opening this area up to energy exploration.

In 2003, the federal government declared a moratorium on the last remaining cod fishery in Atlantic Canada, in the Gulf of St. Lawrence. While Newfoundland was again the most directly affected province by this decision, communities on Quebec's North Shore and in other parts of Atlantic Canada also faced difficulties. Premier Grimes, facing a pending election that fall, used the Gulf cod decision and perceived federal bias against the province as a catalyst to try to rally citizens around his administration. Grimes called for a review of the Act of Union by which the province had become a part of Canada. On 2 July 2003, the findings of the Royal Commission on Renewing and Strengthening Our Place in Canada, which Grimes had created in 2002, were released. It noted the following stressors in the relationship between the province and Canada:

- the huge impact of the destruction of resources of cod
- development of hydroelectricity resources of Labrador by Quebec, primarily to their benefit
- chronically high unemployment
- lowest per-capita income in Canada
- the highest tax rates
- the highest emigration

The report called for more collaborative federalism; an action team to deal with the fishery; further collaboration between Canada, Quebec; and Newfoundland and Labrador on the development of the Gull Island hydro site; a revision of the Atlantic Accord so that offshore oil and gas reserves primarily benefit the province; and an immediate and realistic negotiations on joint management of the fishery

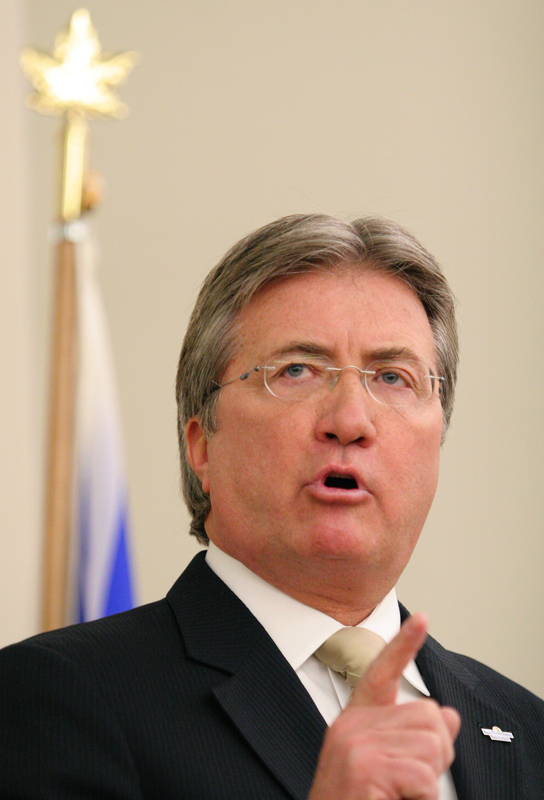
Danny Williams, the ninth premier of Newfoundland and Labrador in 2007. He served the position from 2003 to 2010.

In October 2003, the Liberals lost the provincial election to the Progressive Conservative Party, led by Danny Williams. In 2004, Premier Williams has argued that Prime Minister Paul Martin had not held up his promises for a new deal on the "Atlantic Accord". The issue is the royalties from oil: currently, 70 cents on each royalty dollar are sent back to the federal government through reductions in payments by the federal government with respect to its "equalization program". The province wants 100% of the royalties to allow the province to pull itself out of poverty on a long-term basis.

Toward the end of 2004, Williams ordered the Canadian flag to be removed from all provincial buildings as a protest against federal policies, and asked for municipal councils to consider doing the same. The issue, dubbed the "Flag Flap" in the media, sparked debate across the province and the rest of Canada. The flags went back up in January 2005 after much controversy nationwide and Paul Martin stating that he would not negotiate with the province if the flags were not flying. At the end of January, the federal government signed a deal to allow 100% of oil revenues to go to the province, resulting in an extra $2 billion over eight years for the province. However, this agreement has led other provinces such as Ontario and Quebec to try to negotiate their own special deals as they too claim that the federal government is taking advantage of them financially.

== Issues of identity ==
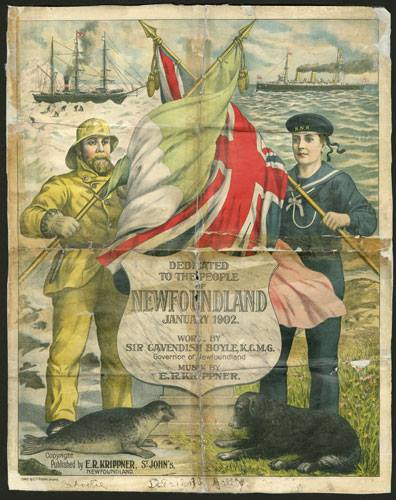
Cover for sheet music to the Ode to Newfoundland from 1902

Nationalist sentiment in the 21st century has become a powerful force in Newfoundland politics and culture, layered on top of a traditional culture deeply embedded in the outports. Gregory (2004) sees it as a development of the late 20th century, for in the 1940s it was not strong enough to stop Confederation with Canada, and the people in the cities adopted a Canadian identity in the 1950s and 1960s.

A Newfoundland identity was first articulated in the 1840s, embodied in a distinction between English-born and native-born Newfoundland residents. The relative absence of a strong sense of belonging to an independent country was the underlying reason for Joey Smallwood's referendum victory. Most islanders were descendants of immigrants from either Ireland or the West Country. It took centuries for them to view themselves as Newfoundlanders first and foremost. Gregory (2004) tried to date the transition from old (European) to new (Newfoundland) in the outport communities using vernacular song texts. Use of three collections of Newfoundland songs demonstrates how by 1930 or so a Newfoundland song culture had replaced earlier cultural traditions. These songs suggest that the island was still a cultural mosaic; some outports were completely Irish, others were West Country, and in a few ethnically mixed communities, including St. John's, there was an emergent, home-grown, patriotic song culture. Cultural nationalism was still a minority tradition in the Newfoundland of 1930. After joining Canada in 1949, Newfoundland culture underwent a significant transformation, notably in the cultural revival of the 1970s, which extolled the virtues of the people before they were hit with efficiency, centralization, and modernity. Thus the "Ode to Newfoundland" is sung with as much gusto in the taverns of Fort McMurray and Calgary in Alberta, or Toronto, as on the island itself.

Traditional Newfoundland heritage enjoyed a renaissance in the arts and crafts. Celebrations of outport life have been combined with a long-standing sense of victimization, offering a parade of historical scapegoats from the fishing admirals to powerful merchants used to explain relative backwardness and failure. Atlantic Canadians increasingly share an angle of vision derived in large part from the unpleasant fact that, compared to the rest of Canada, the Atlantic region is both economically poor and politically weak, and growing more so.

Wayne Johnston's prize-winning novel The Colony of Unrequited Dreams (1999) develops insights into the unique identity of the islanders and challenges prevailing misconceptions about the area among both residents and outsiders. The protagonist of the book is premier Joey Smallwood, with focus on his advocacy of Confederation with Canada. Chafe (2003) sees the novel in terms of postcolonial literature with its attendant themes of displacement, identity, and history. Chafe explores Johnston's use of the phrase "scuttlework of empire" and its many interpretations of the often troubled relationship between the British Empire and Newfoundland settlers.

== See also ==
- List of National Historic Sites of Canada in Newfoundland and Labrador

== Bibliography ==
- Joseph Smallwood ed. The Encyclopedia of Newfoundland and Labrador St. John's: Newfoundland Book Publishers, (1961) (rev ed. 1984), 2 vol.; also cd-rom edition
- Baker, Melvin, and Peter Neary. Joseph Roberts Smallwood: Masthead Newfoundlander, 1900-1949 (2021)
- Bannister, Jerry. The Rule of the Admirals: Law, Custom, and Naval Government in Newfoundland, 1699–1832. (U. of Toronto Press for Osgoode Society, 2003).
- Blake, Raymond B., and Melvin Baker. Where Once They Stood: Newfoundland's Rocky Road to Confederation (University of Regina Press, 2019)
- Blake, Raymond B. Canadians at Last: Canada Integrates Newfoundland as a Province. (U. of Toronto Press, 1994). 252 pp.
- Cadigan, Sean T. Newfoundland and Labrador: A History (U. of Toronto Press, 2009) a standard scholarly history
- Cadigan, Sean T. Hope and Deception in Conception Bay: Merchant-Settler Relations in Newfoundland, 1785–1855. (U. of Toronto Press, 1995). 242 pp.
- Casey, G.J., and Elizabeth Miller, eds., Tempered Days: A Century of Newfoundland Fiction (St. John's: Killick Press, 1996).
- Dickinson, Anthony B. and Sanger, Chesley W. Twentieth-Century Shore-Station Whaling in Newfoundland and Labrador. McGill-Queen's U. Press, (2005).
- Earle; Karl Mcneil. "Cousins of a Kind: The Newfoundland and Labrador Relationship with the United States" American Review of Canadian Studies Vol: 28. Issue: 4. 1998. pp : 387–411.
- English, Christopher, ed. Essays in the History of Canadian Law. Vol. 9. Two Islands: Newfoundland and Prince Edward Island. U. of Toronto Press, (2005).
- FitzGerald, John Edward. Conflict and culture in Irish-Newfoundland Roman Catholicism, 1829-1850 (U of Ottawa, 1997). online Archived 11 November 2021 at the Wayback Machine
- Fay, C. R.; Life and Labour in Newfoundland University of Toronto Press, 1956
- Greene, John P. Between Damnation and Starvation: Priests and Merchants in Newfoundland Politics, 1745–1855.McGill-Queen's U. Press, 2000. 340 pp.
- Guy, Raymond W. Memory is a Fickle Jade: A Collection of Historical Essays about Newfoundland and Her People. St. John's, : Creative Book Publ., 1996. 202 pp.
- Hale, David (Summer 2003). "The Newfoundland Lesson". The International Economy. 17 (3): 52+. Archived from the original on 4 June 2011 – via Questia.
- Handcock, W. Gordon. Newfoundland Origins and Patterns of Migration: A Statistical and Cartographic Summary. (St. John's: Memorial University of Newfoundland, 1977).
- Handcock, W. Gordon. Soe Longe as There Comes Noe Women: Origins of English Settlement in Newfoundland. (Milton Ontario: Global Heritage Press, 2003).
- Harris, Leslie. Newfoundland and Labrador: A Brief History (1968)
- Hollett, Calvin. Shouting, Embracing, and Dancing with Ecstasy: The Growth of Methodism in Newfoundland, 1774–1874 (2010)
- Jackson, Lawrence. Newfoundland & Labrador Fitzhenry & Whiteside Ltd; (1999) ISBN 1-55041-261-2;
- Kealey, Linda, ed. Pursuing Equality: Historical Perspectives on Women in Newfoundland and Labrador. St. John's: Institute of Social and Economic Research, 1993. 310 pp.
- Long, Gene. Suspended State: Newfoundland Before Canada Breakwater Books Ltd; ISBN 1-55081-144-4; (1999)
- MacKay, R.A. Newfoundland; Economic, Diplomatic, and Strategic Studies Oxford University Press, (1946)
- McCann, Phillip. Schooling in a Fishing Society: Education and Economic Conditions in Newfoundland and Labrador, 1836–1986. St. John's: Inst. of Social and Econ. Res., 1994. 277 pp.
- Mayo, H. B. "Newfoundland and Confederation in the Eighteen-Sixties," Canadian Historical Review 29, no. 2 (June 1948): 125–42;
- Neary, Peter. . Newfoundland in the North Atlantic world, 1929–1949. McGill-Queen's University Press, 1996
- O'Flaherty, Patrick. Old Newfoundland: A History to 1843. St John's: Long Beach, 1999. 284 pp.
- Pope, Peter E. Fish into Wine: The Newfoundland Plantation in the Seventeenth Century. U. of North Carolina Press, 2004. 464 pp.
- Prowse, David W. (1896). A History of Newfoundland from the English, Colonial, and Foreign Records. London: Eyre and Spottiswoode. ISBN 9780665514869.
- Rowe, Frederick. History of Newfoundland and Labrador (1980).
- Whitcomb, Dr. Ed. A Short History of Newfoundland and Labrador. Ottawa. From Sea To Sea Enterprises, 2011. ISBN 978-0-9865967-3-5. 64 pp.
- Wright, Miriam. A Fishery for Modern Times: The State and the Industrialization of the Newfoundland Fishery, 1934–1968. Oxford U. Press, 2001. 176 pp.

=== Primary sources ===
- Halpert, Herbert; Widdowson, J. D. A.; Lovelace, Martin J.; and Collins, Eileen, ed. Folktales of Newfoundland: The Resilience of the Oral Tradition. New York: Garland, 1996. 1175 pp.
- Harvey, M. Newfoundland in 1900. A treatise of the geography, natural resources and history of the Island, embracing an account of recent and present large material movements, finely illustrated with maps and half-tone engravings (1900) 187 pp.edition
- Moyles, Robert Gordon, ed. "Complaints is Many and Various, But the Odd Divil Likes It": Nineteenth Century Views of Newfoundland (1975).
- Neary, Peter, and Patrick O'Flaherty, eds. By Great Waters: A Newfoundland and Labrador Anthology (1974)
- O'Flaherty, Patrick ed. The Rock Observed: Literary Responses to Newfoundland and Its People (1979)
- Rompkey, Ronald, ed. Terre-Neuve: Anthologie des Voyageurs Français, 1814–1914 [Newfoundland: anthology of French travelers, 1814–1914]. Presse University de Rennes, 2004. 304 pp.
- Smallwood, Joseph R. I Chose Canada: The Memoirs of the Honourable Joseph R. "Joey" Smallwood. (1973). 600 pp.

=== Vintage histories and year books ===
- Birkenhead, Lord. The story of Newfoundland (2nd ed. 1920) 192pp edition
- Joseph Hatton and Moses Harvey, Newfoundland: Its History and Present Condition, (London, 1883) complete text online
- Millais, John Guille. The Newfoundland Guide Book, 1911: Including Labrador and St. Pierre (1911) online edition; also reprinted 2009
- D. W. Prowse, A History of Newfoundland (1895), current edition 2002, Boulder Publications, Portugal Cove, Newfoundland. text online
- Pedley, Charles. History of Newfoundland, (London, 1863) complete text online
- Tocque, Philip. Newfoundland as it Was and Is, (London, 1878) complete text online
- Kennedy, Arnold. Sport and Adventure in Newfoundland and West Indies, (London, 1885) complete text online
- Moses Harvey, Newfoundland, England's Oldest Colony, (London, 1897) complete text online
- J. P. Howley, Mineral Resources of Newfoundland, (St. John's, 1909)
- P. T. McGrath, Newfound in 1911, (London, 1911)
- Year Book and Almanac of Newfoundland edited by J.W. Withers
  - 1896 edition
  - 1905 edition
  - 1910 edition
  - 1914 edition
  - 1917 edition
  - 1919 edition
  - other editions
