= Amulree (disambiguation) =

Amulree may refer to:

== Places ==
- Amulree, village in Scotland
- Amulree, Ontario, Canada

== People ==
- William Mackenzie, 1st Baron Amulree, a British politician
- Basil William Sholto Mackenzie, 2nd Baron Amulree, a leading advocate of geriatric medicine in the UK

== Other uses ==
- Baron Amulree, a title in the Peerage of the UK
