= Basque settlement in the Americas =

16th to 18th-century migration of Basque people to the American continent

The settlement of Basques in the Americas was the process of Basque emigration and settlement in the New World. Thus, there is a deep cultural and social Basque heritage in some places in the Americas, the most famous of which being Red Bay, Newfoundland and Labrador (a UNESCO World Heritage Site), Saint Pierre and Miquelon, Central America, Guatemala, New Biscay in Northern Mexico and Antioquia, Colombia.

== Background ==
Basques and whaling have an intimate history; the first accounts of Basque whaling dates back to the 670s when the Basques of Labourd sold 40 jars of whale oil. Basques came to hunt whales especially, in the Bay of Biscay in the 16th century, using techniques learned from the Vikings and Normans who plundered the Basque country, formerly named Vasconia in 844.

The most important nuclei of Basque immigration into the Americas were located on the Labourd coast, including Saint-Jean-de-Luz, Ciboure and Bayonne. Other important ports in southern Basque country included Pasaia, Getaria, and Bermeo.

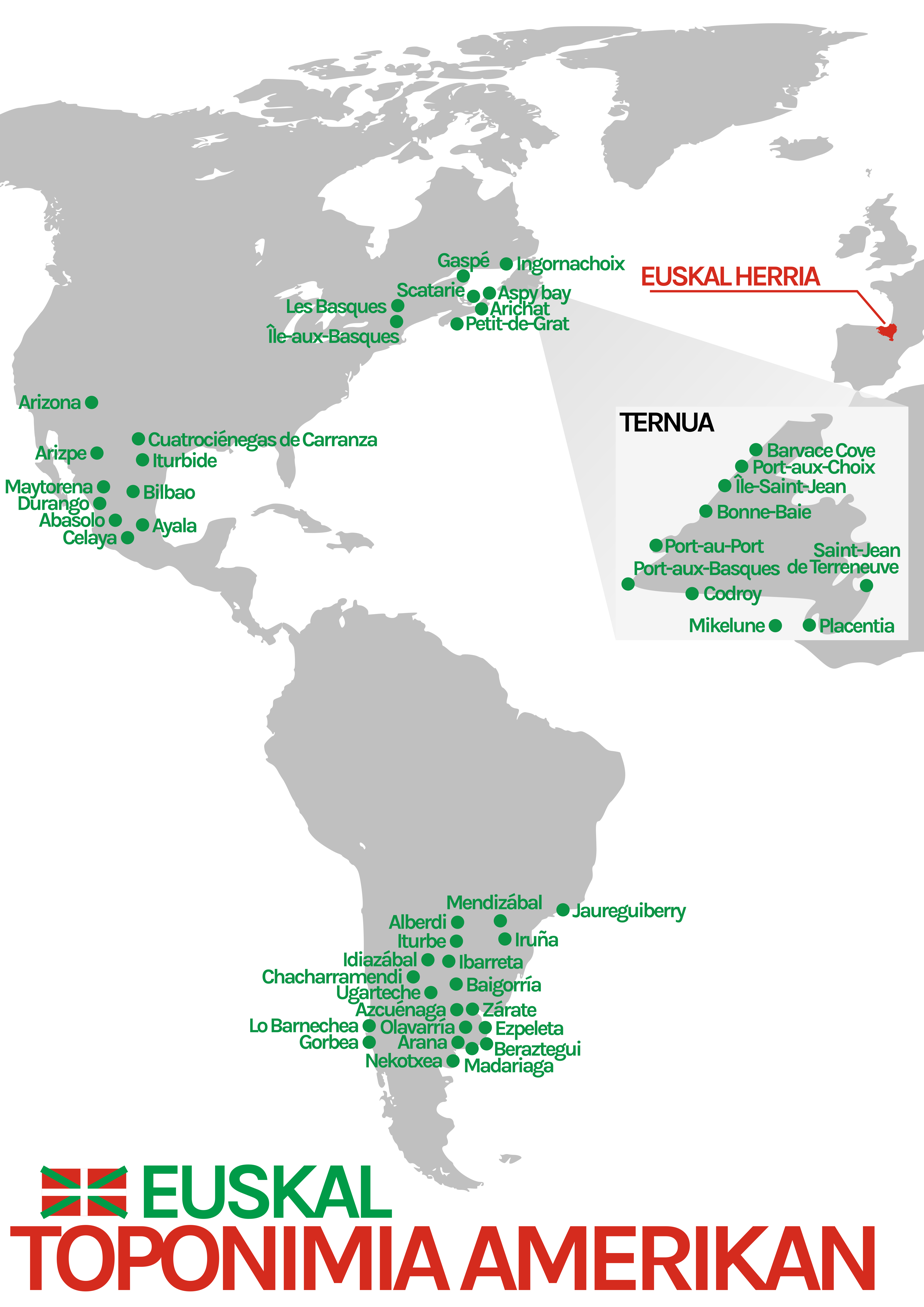
Basque toponyms in the Americas

== Colonization of North America ==
=== Basque monopoly (1530–1580) ===
==== Establishment ====
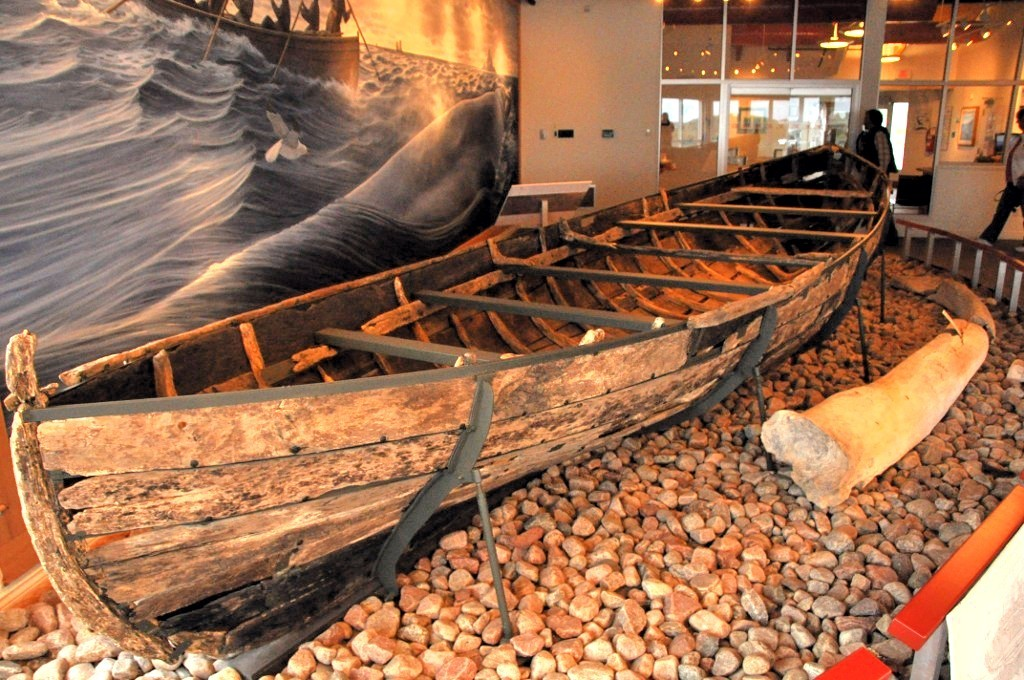
A Basque rowboat recovered from the Red Bay site, exhibited at the local museum.

The first Basque expedition recorded in Newfoundland took place in 1517, but it was around 1530s that a regional establishment could be identified. It is assumed that Basque fishermen gradually approached the American continent, by pursuing cod in first instance, and progressively derivating to the more profitable whaling. It was not the decline of European whales that drove Basque fisherman to Newfoundland; rather, it was the techniques and trade developed in their sardine fishing expeditions in Ireland or whaling on their coasts that enabled the Basques to establish a lucrative monopoly in Labrador. Additionally, Breton cod fishermen frequented Newfoundland before the Basques, the latest expedition being in 1536, and it was from the Bretons that the Basque became aware of the rich population of cetaceans in Newfoundland waters.

Subsequently, the Basque began fishing for cod in the south of Newfoundland, in Plaisance Bay (now Placentia), St. Mary's Bay and Trepassey, as well as in the east in places like St John's and Renews-Cappahayden. Other fishing sites were recorded in the Strait of Belle Isle, between Labrador and Newfoundland, around 1535. A third area, near the Strait of Canso, was also frequented by Basque fisherman in the 1560s.

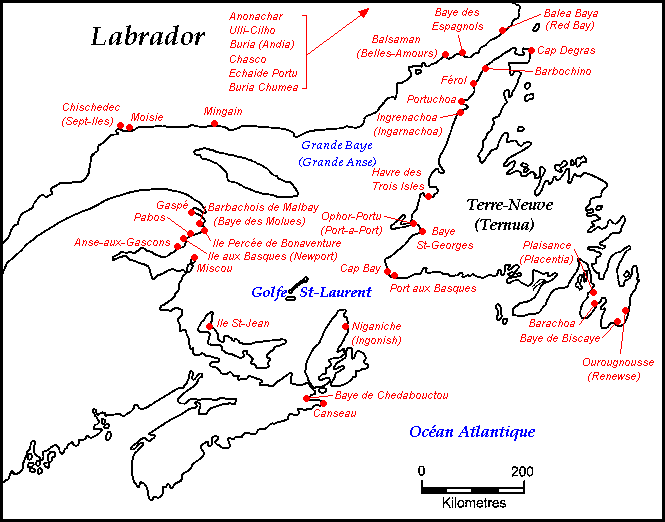
Basque sites in Newfoundland

When Frenchman Jacques Cartier founded the settlement of Charlesbourg-Royal in 1541, the Spanish Empire took interest in the region and began asking the fisherman about their voyages. It seems that the whaling station of Buitres (present day Red Bay) was founded in reaction to the threat of the colony, and Charlesbourg-Royal became abandoned later that year. It is worth noting that the Basques only occupied the straits of Gulf of St. Lawrence, corresponding to the halt of French advances from the west in 1535. As noted by British historian David Beers Quinn, this may be a strategy employed by Spain in the context of the colonial competitions between Britain, France, and Spain. The Basque whaling ships were imposing at the time; they were armed with cannons, were included in the Spanish naval reserve, and many crew members had combat skills. The French did not found any settlements in the region for the next three decades.

Fishermen continued to fish in late summer, just before the whales migrate. It is from the Buitres site of which the most written evidence remains, including those mentioning the sinking of the Basque ship San Juan in 1563, the disastrous winter of 1576–1577, and a will signed shortly after by a dying Basque, the first document of the genre written in Canada. The documents mainly cover the period from 1548 to 1588, and the last winter the Basques spent there was in 1603.

==== Franco-Spanish rivalry ====
The French Basques, just as experienced as the Spanish Basques, likely also sent ships to the region in the 1540s. French-Spanish struggles in Italy also came to Newfoundland too. In 1554, Basque ships from Labourd and Bordeaux (based in Buitres) attacked Basques from Gipuzkoa and Biscay in Saint-Modeste-Ouest. After the signing of the Peace of Cateau-Cambrésis in 1559, the ships of the Guipuskoa and Biscay increased in number while ones from Labourd declined. However, Johannes de Gaberie, a Basque from Saint-Jean-de-Luz, resisted and spent the winter from 1562 to 1563 in an undetermined port. His boat was attacked by another from Biscay, resulting in many crew members killed and the oil cargo stolen. It is unclear if he returned to Newfoundland. This last conflict thus marks the beginning of the monopoly of the Spanish Basques in the Strait of Belle Isle.

==== English opposition and decline of the whaling industry ====
During the 1570s, Basque fisheries in America employed more than 6,000 people and utilised more than 200 ships. In Buitres, 900 sailors come aboard 15 ships every summer. Surplus oil was sold in England. However, most historians note a gradual decline in whaling, while other scholars argue shows that it was sudden; in 1579, there were 30 trips in a single year, which declined to 13 annual trips during the 1580's. Several theories explain this fall, including climate change, decline of the whale population, or the bankruptcy of Spanish insurers in 1572. Another important factor is the attacks of the Inuit, who moved to southern Labrador and seemingly opposed the Basque presence. Three Inuit attacks were recorded between 1575 and 1618, resulting in several deaths; the Innu, allies of the Basques, tried to warn them of imminent attacks. Finally, attacks by English and Danish pirates in the Gulf of St. Lawrence (and later St. Lawrence River) contributed to not only a change in routes taken by the Basques, but also the decline of the industry as a whole.

Loewen and Delmas argue that it was the English opposition to the Spanish monopoly that resulted in this decline. Basque merchants were met with increasing hostility from English. In 1578, Captain Anthony Parkhurst presented a report on the Basque fisheries to the Parliament of England, and proposed to fortify the posts in the Strait of Belle Isle to strengthen the English position there. Likely aware that the whale oil trade finances control of the strait, the parliamentarians voted to ban the import of Basque oil on February 1, 1579. At the same time, the Basques began abandoning positions of the Atlantic coast of Newfoundland to the English.

Whaling expeditions continued to decline; the season of 1578 was preemptively disrupted, and the season of 1579 was cancelled. New hunting expeditions were organized in 1582, but the Admiralty forced the boats to go to the West Indies in order to compensate for the losses caused by English and Danish pirates. The sponsors responded with a lawsuit but ended up complying with the decision. The impact on the economy of Gizpukoa is significant and is felt until 1585. According to Loewen and Delmas, the absolute monopoly of the Basques between 1543 and 1579 remained a turning point in Canadian history.

=== Displacement to the Gulf of Saint Lawrence (1580–1630) ===
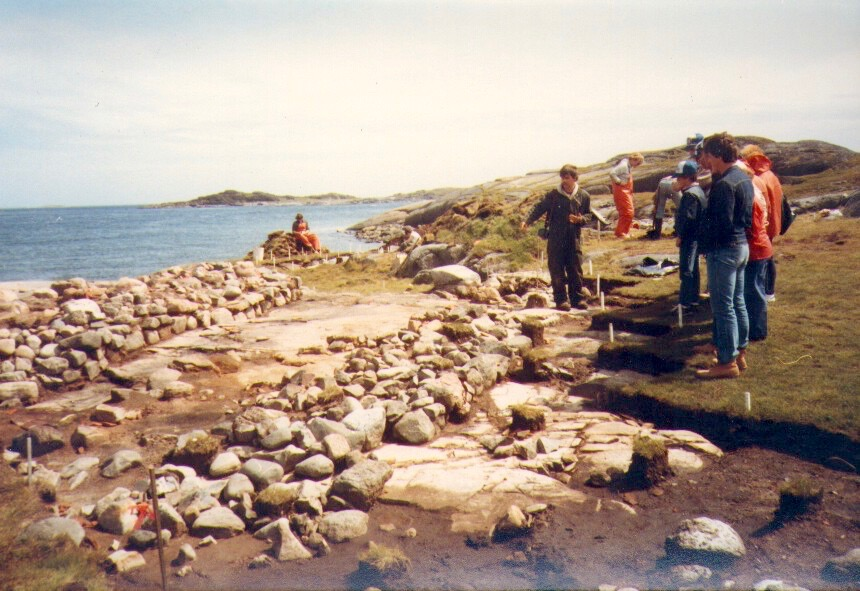
Remains of a Basque settlement on Saddle Island, Newfoundland and Labrador

Despite the destruction of the industry in the Strait of Belle Isle, the Basques settled further west in the Gulf of St. Lawrence. They are among the first Europeans to settle there and occupy strategic sites. Historians have mostly focused on their commercial activities, but fishing continued to flourish modestly too. The Hoyarsabal brothers, from Saint-Jean-de-Luz, set up whalers and merchants in the St. Lawrence estuary as early as 1581. Archaeological remains have been discovered on Île aux Basques and on Côte-Nord in sites identified as Chafaud-aux-Basques and Les Escoumins. Les Escoumins is abandoned between 1607 and 1611, while Chafaud-aux-Basques was still occupied until 1632; however, fishermen only intermittently visited the sites.

Two Basque ships crashed in St. George's Bay, southwestern Newfoundland, in 1591. This is the first mention of a Basque presence in the region.

Two battles are fought between the Basques and the English corsairs to control the hunting of the Magdalen Islands' walruses, with the last in 1597.

The Chaleur Bay, separating Quebec and New Brunswick, also began to experience Basque settlement in the 17th century. Cod fishermen settle on the north shore in Percé, while whale hunters go to Miscou. The latter also maintained a trading post on behalf of the Caen Trading Company.

There was extensive contact between the Basques and the Mi'kmaqs, giving rise to the population called the "Canadiens" (not dissimilar to the French-Indian Metis), with Basque names and "European" manners, moving in Basque longboats and guarding the hunting/fishing stations during the winter, The settlement of the Canadiens is identified as Pichiguy in a 1689 map, and located on the north shore of Caraquet Bay. A lasting legacy of this is the last name of "Basque" being quite common among Mi'kmaq communities.

Associates from the Caen Trading Company and Company of One Hundred Associates opposed the Basque merchants in Tadoussac, Miscou and Acadia. Merchants from Saint-Jean-de-Luz responded by contesting the French monopoly at Court. The Court ruled that the Basques should stop trading in beaver fur, but they did not submit to this decision until 1626. The Labourd merchants were most strongly opposed to the decision.

The Basques set out to hunt in Svalbard in 1612, attracted by the greater number of whales and the shorter distance. However, they experienced a violent clash with the English in 1613. They still tried to hunt in the North Sea over the next years without major success, still believing that hunting in Labrador is no longer good enough.

=== Height of the cod fisheries (1630–1713) ===
Due to the ensuing Thirty Years' War in Europe, this period is the least investigated and least known of the four other periods. Following the ban on the fur trade, the merchants of Saint-Jean-de-Luz showed little interest in whaling. The Basques who remained in the Gulf of St. Lawrence then took an almost exclusive interest in fishing and maintained cordial relations with the French, while New France reached its peak in expansion. Around 1632, the Basques found it safer to hunt whales in places further away from the Gulf, including Ekuanitshit and Les Escoumins on the North Shore.

Cod fishermen are divided into two groups. One was those of Labourd operating on the southern shore of the Gulf, between Gaspé and Cape Breton. It however has no written evidence of their presence on Cape Breton Island and Prince Edward Island, but we know that the Strait of Canso is an important geographical marker. They share certain facilities with French fishermen coming mainly from Saint-Malo, notably in Paspébiac and the Bonaventure Island, as well as in the Acadian Peninsula at Caraquet and Shippagan.

The second group, coming from Guipuzcoa and Biscay, settled on the west shore of Newfoundland and in the Lower North Shore. Their presence is better known, thanks to the work of the geographers of the time on behalf of the French government, as well as documents from the consultations of the Spanish Admiralty in 1697. Plaisance became the capital of French Newfoundland in 1662 and continued to welcome fishermen from these two Basque provinces.

=== Decline (1713–1760) ===
These Basque hunters and fishermen continue their activities in safety until the end of the 18th century, but the industry is no longer considered important to the Spanish side. The French Basques, continued to make hunting trips in southern Labrador during the 18th century, often from the Fortress of Louisbourg. The lordships are even granted to southern Labrador to Quebec merchants. From 1689, the French and Indian Wars made the activities of the Basques difficult. The 1713 Peace of Utrecht, under which France ceded Newfoundland to Britain, led to a sharp decline of the Basque cod industry and causes the decline of Saint-Jean-de-Luz and Ciboure. The 1763 Treaty of Paris, which saw the French cede New France to Britain and Spain (except for Saint Pierre and Miquelon) permanently deprived the Basque ports of their influence in North America. Those of Basque heritage either immigrated to other places or settled quietly.

== Colonization of South America ==
The Basque colonization of South America was driven mainly due to the decline of the Spanish Empire. Some Basques took advantage of the post-independence movements in Latin America to emigrate to South America for financial prospects. Many either remained in South America or returned to Basque country after earning fortunes.

=== Basque emigration to Argentina and Uruguay ===
The push of external and internal causes in Basque country, such as the Carlist Wars, rise of Basque population, and industrialization of Basque society coincided with Argentina and Uruguay looking to take in immigrants to settle the inland of the Rio de la Plata. The Vitoria-Gasteiz consulate in Basque country thus placed advertisements in Basque newspapers to encourage them to immigrate to the Rio de la Plata. The consul himself told the Spanish Minister of Foreign Affairs that Basques were ideal for immigration because they were Catholics, hardworking men, and spoke dual Basque and the Spanish language.

The first stage of immigration to Argentina (1835–1853) occurred among Basque shepherds in the northern Basque country. It was followed by a post-constitutional stage (1853–1877) where many emigrants settled in the Pampas region. Later, between 1877 and 1914, following the Argentine adaption of the immigration law, another wave of Basque immigrants followed.

== Legacy ==
=== Algonquian-Basque pidgin ===
Algonquian-Basque pidgin was a pidgin spoken by Basque whalers and peoples of Algonquian languages such as Mi'kmaq, the Innu and Inuit of Labrador in the area of the Strait of Belle Isle and Northern St. Lawrence Gulf to the Atlantic Ocean. Elements of Basque are preserved in the Mi'kmaq language, such as atlai ("shirt", deriving from the Basque atorra) and elege ("king", deriving from the Basque errege).

=== Religion and symbols ===
Coat of arms of Saint Pierre and Miquelon (note the Basque flag on the top left)

When Jacques Cartier met the Mi'kmaq during his first trip in 1534, some wore a cross around their neck, signifying an older contact with Christianity. Additionally, he noted the Mi'kmaq decorated their canoes and baskets with a symbol that happens to be the lauburu, or Basque cross.

The unofficial flag of Saint Pierre and Miquelon, along with its coat of arms, incorporates the Basque flag.

=== Toponymy ===
Many toponyms in Canada, including approximately a hundred in Quebec, come from the Basque language. There are places like Baratxoa (Barachois), Île aux Basques, and Port-aux-Basques. Many other places have names like Originac, Original or Orignaux, coming from the Basque word oregnac, designating the moose (known as the elk in Europe). In addition, according to Koldo Mitxelena, the name of Gaspé is a corruption of the Basque gerizpe or kerizpe, which means “shelter”. A regional municipality in Quebec is also called Les Basques, borrowing its name from Île aux Basques.

In Newfoundland and Labrador, many coastal toponyms have a Basque origin such as Portuchoa (Port-aux-Choix), Oportuportu (Port-au-Port), Aingura Txar (Ingornachoix Bay), Cadarrai (Codroy), Placencia (Placentia), others are a translation from Basque such as Sen Iango Irla (Île Saint-Jean), Sen Iango Portua (Saint John Harbor), Baya ederra (Bonne Bay), Barbot Chillo (Barbace Cove). Several have simply changed their names such as Granbaya (Strait of Belle Isle), Tres Irlac (Bays of Islands), Sascot Portu (Port-aux-Basques), and Oporporteco Barrachoa (Serpentine River).

In Nova Scotia, localities such as Arichat, Aspy Bay, Baleine Harbor, Petit-de-Grat, Gabarus, Ingonish, Scatarie, and Spanish Bay have Basque roots.

== See also ==
- Indiano, denomination for Spanish emigrants to the Americas.
