= Christopher Thomson, 1st Baron Thomson =

British politician (1875–1930)

Brigadier-General The Right Honourable The Lord Thomson CBE DSO PC
- Thomson in 1926

Secretary of State for Air
- In office 22 January 1924 – 3 November 1924
- Monarch: George V
- Prime Minister: Ramsay MacDonald
- Preceded by: Sir Samuel Hoare
- Succeeded by: Sir Samuel Hoare
- In office 7 June 1929 – 5 October 1930
- Monarch: George V
- Prime Minister: Ramsay MacDonald
- Preceded by: Sir Samuel Hoare
- Succeeded by: The Lord Amulree

Personal details
- Born: 13 April 1875 Nasik, British India
- Died: 5 October 1930 (aged 55) Allone, France
- Resting place: Cardington, Bedfordshire
- Party: Labour

Christopher Birdwood Thomson, 1st Baron Thomson, CBE, DSO, PC (13 April 1875 – 5 October 1930) was a British Army officer who went on to serve as a Labour minister and peer. He served as Secretary of State for Air under Ramsay MacDonald in 1924 and between 1929 and 1930, when he was killed in the R101 disaster.

== Early life ==
Born in Nasik (now Nashik) in the Bombay Presidency of India to a military family, Thomson attended Cheltenham College. His father was Major-General David Thompson, R.E., and his mother was the daughter of Major-General Christopher Birdwood; Field Marshal The 1st Baron Birdwood was another grandson of Major-General Birdwood.

== Career ==
=== Military ===
After graduating from the Royal Military Academy, Woolwich, in 1894, Thomson was commissioned into the Royal Engineers. He served first in Mauritius and then saw action during the Second Boer War (1899–1902), during which he was in command of a field company section and was mentioned in dispatches. He also had his first encounter with aviation when he was detailed to help with the R.E. Balloon Section outside Kimberley. After the war, he became an instructor at the School of Military Engineering at Chatham and then in Sierra Leone. He was promoted to captain and brevet major in 1904, and in 1909 joined the Army Staff College in Camberley. In 1911, he went to the War Office, and in 1912 Thomson was appointed military attaché with the Serbian army during the first and Second Balkan Wars, after which he returned to the War Office in 1913.

During the First World War, Thomson first served at the British Expeditionary Force Headquarters and was Chief Military Interpreter between Sir John French and General Joffre. In 1915 he was sent to Bucharest as military attaché on Kitchener's initiative to bring the Kingdom of Romania into the war. But when there he quickly formed the view that an unprepared and ill-armed Romania facing a war on three fronts against Austria-Hungary, Turkey and Bulgaria would be a liability rather than an asset to the allies. This view was brushed aside by Whitehall, and he signed a Military Convention with Romania on 13 August 1916. By the end of 1916, he had to alleviate the consequences of Romania's capitulation, and he supervised the destruction of the Romanian oil wells to deny them to the German Empire.

From 27 August 1917 to 27 May 1918, Thomson served as Commander, Royal Engineers (CRE), of 60th (2/2nd London) Division in Palestine, commanding the divisional engineers in the Battle of Beersheba, the attack on the Sheria position, and the Capture of Jerusalem. He distinguished himself at the Capture of Jericho.

After a distinguished wartime career both behind the lines and at the front, Thomson formed part of the British delegation at the Versailles conference, but condemned the Versailles terms as "containing the seeds of another war." As in Romania where he followed a policy (of making Romania an ally) with which he did not agree, he found the experience to be profoundly negative.

=== Politics ===
After Versailles Thomson made the decision to enter politics, and joined the Labour Party and Fabian Society. He stood as Labour candidate in two Tory strongholds, Bristol Central in 1922 and St Albans in 1923, but failed to win either seat. In 1924, however, newly elected Labour Prime Minister Ramsay MacDonald elevated him to the peerage as Baron Thomson, of Cardington in the County of Bedford. He was sworn of the Privy Council at the same time. He served as Secretary of State for Air in MacDonald's first short lived Labour administration of 1924 – interrupting briefly Sir Samuel Hoare's seven-year grip on the post. The fall of the government meant that it was not until 1929 that he regained the position, once again serving under MacDonald. In the interim he had maintained his air interests acting as chairman of the Royal Aeronautical Society and the Royal Aero Club, and patron of the Air League.

== Private life ==
Lord Thomson was known as Kit to his family and C. B. to his friends. In March 1915, while British military attache in Bucharest, he met the (married) French-Romanian author Princess Marthe Bibesco, and remained devoted to her for the rest of his life. They corresponded regularly. She dedicated four books to "C.B.T." and visited the site of the R101 accident with their mutual friend, the Abbé Mugnier, in December 1930.

== Death ==
His second term in office was cut short by tragedy as Thomson died in the crash of the R101 airship, a government-designed dirigible, on its maiden flight to Karachi in October 1930. The accident, caused partly by pressure put on by Lord Thomson to make the maiden flight before safety checks were complete and adequate flight testing, claimed the lives of 48 people and led to the cancellation of the British airship programme by Thomson's successor as air minister, Lord Amulree.

== Selected works ==
- Works in the National Archives
- Old Europe's Suicide; or, The Building of a Pyramid of Errors, 1922.
- Smaranda. A Compilation in Three Parts, Lord Thomson of Cardington (Christopher Birdwood Thomson), Jonathan Cape, 1926.
- Lord Thomson of Cardington: A memoir and some letters, Martha Bibescu, Jonathan Cape, 1932.

Political offices
Preceded by Sir Samuel Hoare	Secretary of State for Air; 1924	Succeeded by Sir Samuel Hoare
Preceded by Sir Samuel Hoare	Secretary of State for Air; 1929–1930	Succeeded by The Lord Amulree
Peerage of the United Kingdom
New creation	Baron Thomson; 1924–1930	Extinct
