= Baron Amulree =

Extinct barony in the Peerage of the United Kingdom

Baron Amulree, of Strathbraan in the County of Perth, was a title in the Peerage of the United Kingdom. It was created on 22 July 1929 for the lawyer and Labour politician Sir William Mackenzie. He was Secretary of State for Air between 1930 and 1931. He was succeeded by his son, a physician. The second Lord Amulree was unmarried and the title became extinct on his death on 15 December 1983.

== Barons Amulree (1929) ==
- William Warrender Mackenzie, 1st Baron Amulree (1860–1942)
- Basil William Sholto Mackenzie, 2nd Baron Amulree (1900–1983)

Coat of arms of Baron Amulree
Crest A dexter cubit arm charged with a thistle leaved and slipped and grasping in the hand a sword point upwards Proper pommel and hilt Or. Escutcheon Azure a stag’s head caboshed Or on a chief Ermine a rose Gules barbed and seeded Proper between two millrinds of the second. Supporters On either side an eagle reguardant Proper collared Or that on the dexter holding in the beak a sprig of mountain ash fruit Proper and that on the sinister a sprig of myrtle also fruited Proper. Motto I To The Hills
