= William Ewen Stavert =

Canadian banker

Sir William Ewen Stavert, KBE (9 April 1861 – 31 December 1937) was a Canadian banker. He was Financial Adviser to the Government of Newfoundland from 1932 until his death.

Born in Summerside, Colony of Prince Edward Island, Stavert worked in Canadian banking for forty years. During the First World War, he was Financial Controller in the British Ministry of Information and its Accounting Officer to HM Treasury; he was knighted as a KBE in 1919.

Appointed Financial Adviser to the Government of Newfoundland in 1932, he was Newfoundland's representative on the Newfoundland Royal Commission, which recommended the suspension of responsible government.
