= Ingornachoix Bay =

Coordinates: 50.666°N 57.348°W

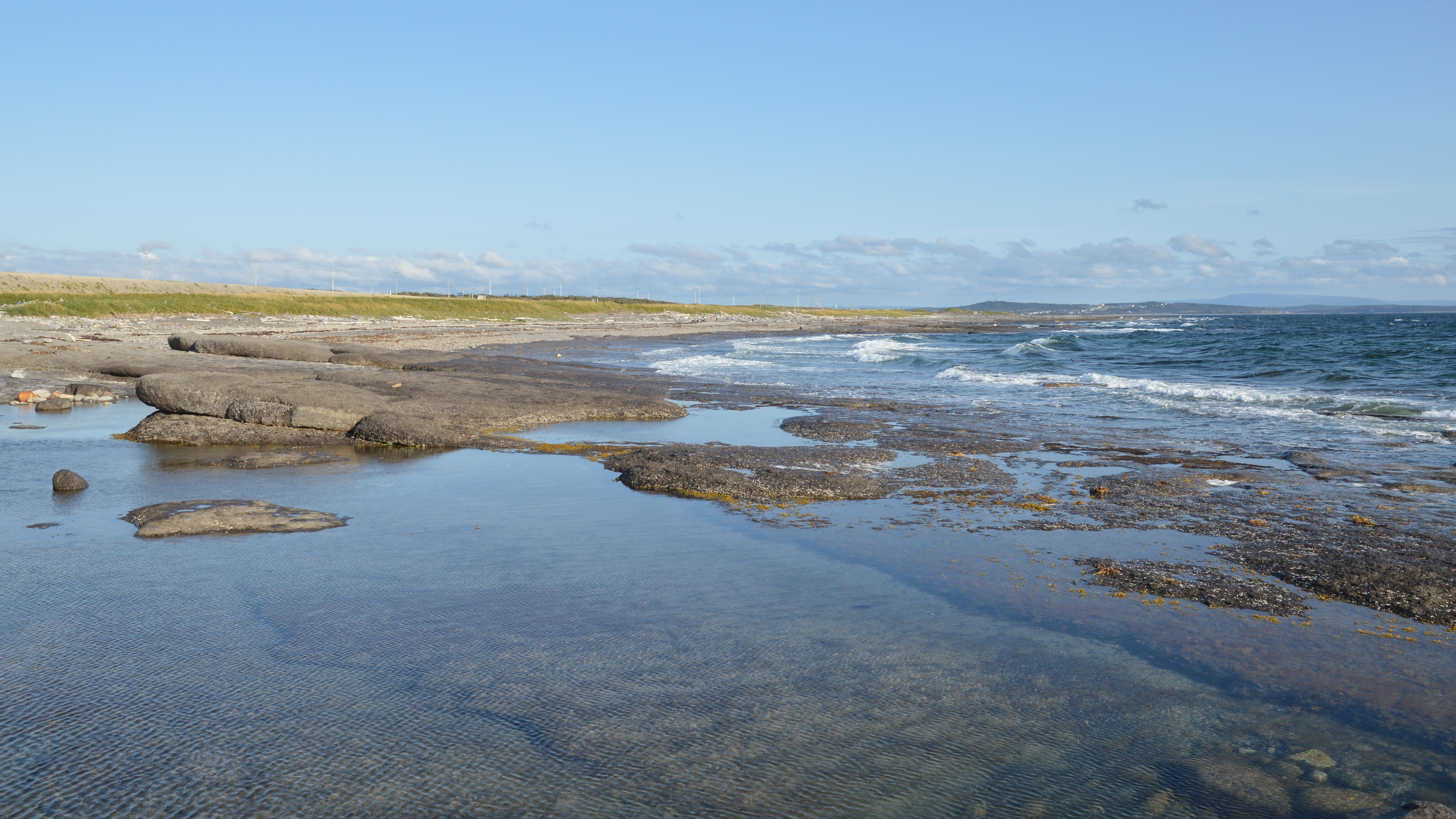

Ingornachoix Bay is a natural bay on the island of Newfoundland in the province of Newfoundland and Labrador, Canada. It is located approximately mid-way along the western shore of the Great Northern Peninsula. Home to three villages, Port aux Choix, Port Saunders and Hawkes Bay.
