= Raymond B. Blake =

Canadian historian

Raymond Benjamin Blake FRSC is a Canadian writer and professor of history at the University of Regina. He was the winner of the 2025 Shaughnessy Cohen Prize for Political Writing.

== Biography ==
Blake is based in Regina, Saskatchewan, where he works as a professor of history at the University of Regina. He has previously held positions as the director of the Saskatchewan Institute of Public Policy and director of the Centre for Canadian Studies at Mount Allison University. He has written and edited over 20 books across his career.

Blake is a Fellow of the Royal Society of Canada. In September 2025, he was awarded the Shaughnessy Cohen Prize for Political Writing for his book Canada's Prime Ministers and the Shaping of a National Identity.

== Publications ==
- Blake, Raymond B. (1994). Canadians at Last: The Integration of Newfoundland as a Province. Toronto: University of Toronto Press. ISBN 978-0-8020-0554-0.
- —; Bryden, Penny; Strain, J. Frank (1997). The Welfare State in Canada: Past, Present, and Future. Concord, ON: Irwin Publishing. ISBN 978-0-7725-2397-6.
- —; Bryden, Penny; Tucker, Michael (2000). Canada and the New World Order: Facing the New Millennium. Concord, ON: Irwin Publishing. ISBN 978-0-7725-2827-8.
- — (2000). From Fishermen to Fish: The Evolution of Canadian Fishery Policy. Concord, ON: Irwin Publishing. ISBN 978-0-7725-2822-3.
- —; Keshen, Jeffrey A. (2006). Social Fabric or Patchwork Quilt?: The Development of Social Welfare in Canada. Peterborough, ON: Broadview Press. ISBN 978-1-5511-1544-3.
- — (2007). Transforming the Nation: Canada and Brian Mulroney. Montreal: McGill–Queen's University Press. ISBN 978-0-7735-3214-4.
- — (2009). From Rights to Needs: A History of Family Allowances in Canada, 1929–92. Vancouver: UBC Press. ISBN 978-0-7748-1572-7.
- — (2015). Lions or Jellyfish: Newfoundland-Ottawa Relations since 1957. Toronto: University of Toronto Press. ISBN 978-1-4426-5025-1.
- —; Hayday, Mathew (2016). Celebrating Canada: Holidays, National Days, and the Crating of Identities. Toronto: University of Toronto Press. ISBN 978-1-4426-4980-4.
- —; Baker, Melvin (2019). Where Once They Stood: Newfoundland's Rocky Road towards Confederation. Regina, SK: University of Regina Press. ISBN 978-0-8897-7619-7.
- — (2025). Canada's Prime Ministers and the Shaping of a National Identity. Vancouver: UBC Press. ISBN 978-0-7748-6964-5.
