= Newfoundland Royal Commission =

1933 UK royal commission on Newfoundland finances

The Newfoundland Royal Commission or Amulree Commission (as it came to be known) was a royal commission established on February 17, 1933 by the Government of the United Kingdom "to examine into the future of Newfoundland and in particular to report on the financial situation and prospects therein."

During the Great Depression Newfoundland faced an economic crisis; Canadian banks extended credit to the colonial government, but did so under harsh terms. On 5 April 1932 a riot at the Colonial Building in St John's precipitated the government's collapse.

In November 1932, the Newfoundland government led by Frederick C. Alderdice told the public and international community that it would be in default on payments to the public debt, which then stood at $100 million. This worried the British and Canadian governments who feared this would cause a bad reaction on the already fragile stock markets during the Depression. It was agreed then, that Canada and Britain would provide short term financial assistance pending the full report of a royal commission.

The British government appointed the chairman, Lord Amulree. The Canadian government appointed Charles Alexander Magrath, a former member of the House of Commons of Canada, and the Newfoundland government appointed Sir William Ewen Stavert, a Canadian who was financial advisor to the Newfoundland government.

== Timeline of the commission ==
- March 12, the three commissioners met in St. John's and were received by the Governor, Sir David Murray Anderson.
- March 16, the Prime Minister formally welcomed the commission on behalf of the government and the Newfoundland people.
- March 20, the commission commenced regular sitting for the purpose of hearing evidence. This continued five days a week until April 14.
- April 17, the commission left the capital of St. John's to tour some of the coastal towns and villages. Over the next two weeks the commission visited the communities of Harbour Grace, Carbonear, Heart's Content, Winterton, Bonavista, Catalina, Trinity, Lewisporte, Stephenville, and St. George's.
- April 28, the commission departed Newfoundland for Ottawa, Ontario, Canada, where it stayed until May 22 gathering information from witnesses who could not meet the commission in St. John's.
- The commission next proceeded to Montreal, to interview the general managers of the Bank of Montreal on the subject of Newfoundland's debt.
- May 24, the commission left Montreal for Halifax where it interviewed the general managers of the Bank of Nova Scotia, and heard more evidence, mostly relating to the Newfoundland fishery
- May 27, the commission left Halifax and arrived in St. John's on May 29
- May 30, the commission resumed sittings in St. John's and continued until the end of June.
- In total, the commission held approximately 100 formal sittings and listened to 260 witnesses.

== Main recommendations of the commission ==
- The existing form of government would be suspended until such time as the Island may become self-supporting.
- A special Commission of Government would be created which would be presided over by the Governor, and would take the place of the existing Legislature and Executive Council.
- The Commission of Government would be composed of six members, exclusive of the Governor, three of whom would be drawn from Newfoundland and three from the United Kingdom.
- The Government Departments in the Island would be divided into six groups. Each group would be placed in the charge of a Member of the Commission of Government, who would be responsible for the efficient working of the Departments.
- The proceedings of the Commission of Government would be subject to supervisory control by the government of the United Kingdom, and the Governor would be responsible to the Secretary of State for Newfoundland in the United Kingdom for the good governance of the Island.
- The government of the United Kingdom would be responsible for the finances of the island until the time in which the island is once again self-sufficient.
- It would be understood that, as soon as the Island's difficulties are overcome and the country is again self-supporting, responsible government, on request from the people of Newfoundland, would be restored.

== Aftermath ==
The report and recommendations were well received by both the media and most members of the public. In November 1933, it was debated by the legislature which subsequently passed an address to the Crown requesting the suspension of the constitution. The Newfoundland Act 1933, an Act of the British parliament providing for direct rule, was given Royal assent on 21 December 1933. The Commission of Government took control of the country on 16 February 1934 (lasting until it was dissolved on 31 March 1949).

== See also ==
- Dominion of Newfoundland
- Commission of Government
- Province of Newfoundland and Labrador
