= Basil Mackenzie, 2nd Baron Amulree =

Physician

Lord Amulree in 1949

Basil Mackenzie, 2nd Baron Amulree, KBE FRCP (25 July 1900 – 15 December 1983), was a British physician and leading advocate of geriatric medicine in the United Kingdom.

== Background and education ==
Amulree was born in South Kensington, London, England, the son of William Mackenzie, a barrister, and Lilian, daughter of W. H. Bradbury. He was educated at Lancing College and Gonville and Caius College, Cambridge.

== Career ==
Upon graduating Amulree joined the Ministry of Health, initially working on the delivery of cancer services, but then on what would become geriatrics. Amulree at the ministry, J. H. Sheldon in Wolverhampton, Marjory Warren, Trevor Howell in Croydon and Oxford's Lionel Cosin were some of the founders of the Medical Society for the Care of the Elderly in 1947. In time, this would become the British Geriatrics Society and Amulree would lead this until 1973.

In 1929, Amulree's father was created Baron Amulree, and in 1942 he succeeded him in the barony, gaining a seat in the House of Lords.

In 1949 he became physician in charge of the geriatric department at University College Hospital, London. He was governor and president of a number of organisations including the British Geriatrics Society, the Society for the Study of Medical Ethics and the Association of Occupational Therapists.

In the Lords he sat as a Liberal and was a party Whip between 1955 and 1977. He spoke in the Lords on a variety of issues in relation to the care of the elderly.

== Personal life ==
Amulree died on 15 December 1983, aged 83, unmarried. The barony became extinct on his death. According to James Lord, around 1948 he was having an affair with the art historian Douglas Cooper; when they parted, Cooper settled with John Richardson.

== Arms ==
Coat of arms of Basil Mackenzie, 2nd Baron Amulree
| Crest A dexter cubit arm charged with a thistle leaved and slipped and grasping in the hand a sword point upwards Proper pommel and hilt Or. Escutcheon Azure a stag’s head caboshed Or on a chief Ermine a rose Gules barbed and seeded Proper between two millrinds of the second. Supporters On either side an eagle reguardant Proper collared Or that on the dexter holding in the beak a sprig of mountain ash fruit Proper and that on the sinister a sprig of myrtle also fruited Proper. Motto I To The Hills |

Peerage of the United Kingdom
| Preceded by William Warrender Mackenzie | Baron Amulree; 1942–1983 | Extinct |
