= Secretary of State for Air =

Former cabinet-level position in British government

- Royal Arms as used by His Majesty's Government

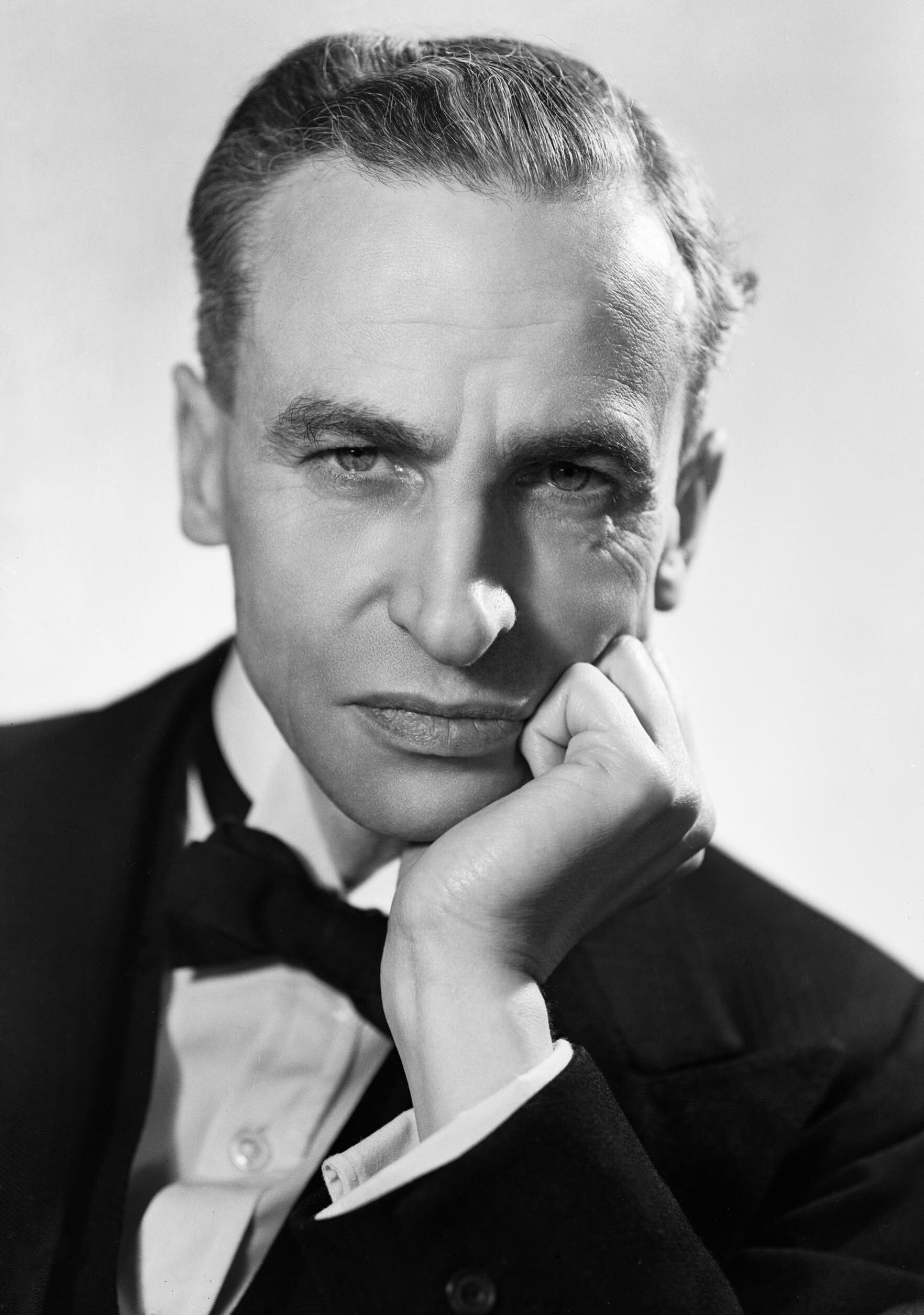
- Longest serving Archibald Sinclair, 1st Viscount Thurso; 11 May 1940 – 23 May 1945
- Air Ministry
- Status: Abolished; Formerly, Secretary of state
- Member of: British Cabinet; Privy Council
- Seat: Westminster, London
- Appointer: The British Monarch on advice of the Prime Minister
- Term length: No fixed term
- Precursor: President of the Air Council
- Formation: 10 January 1919
- First holder: Winston Churchill
- Final holder: Hugh Fraser
- Abolished: 1 April 1964
- Succession: Secretary of State for Defence

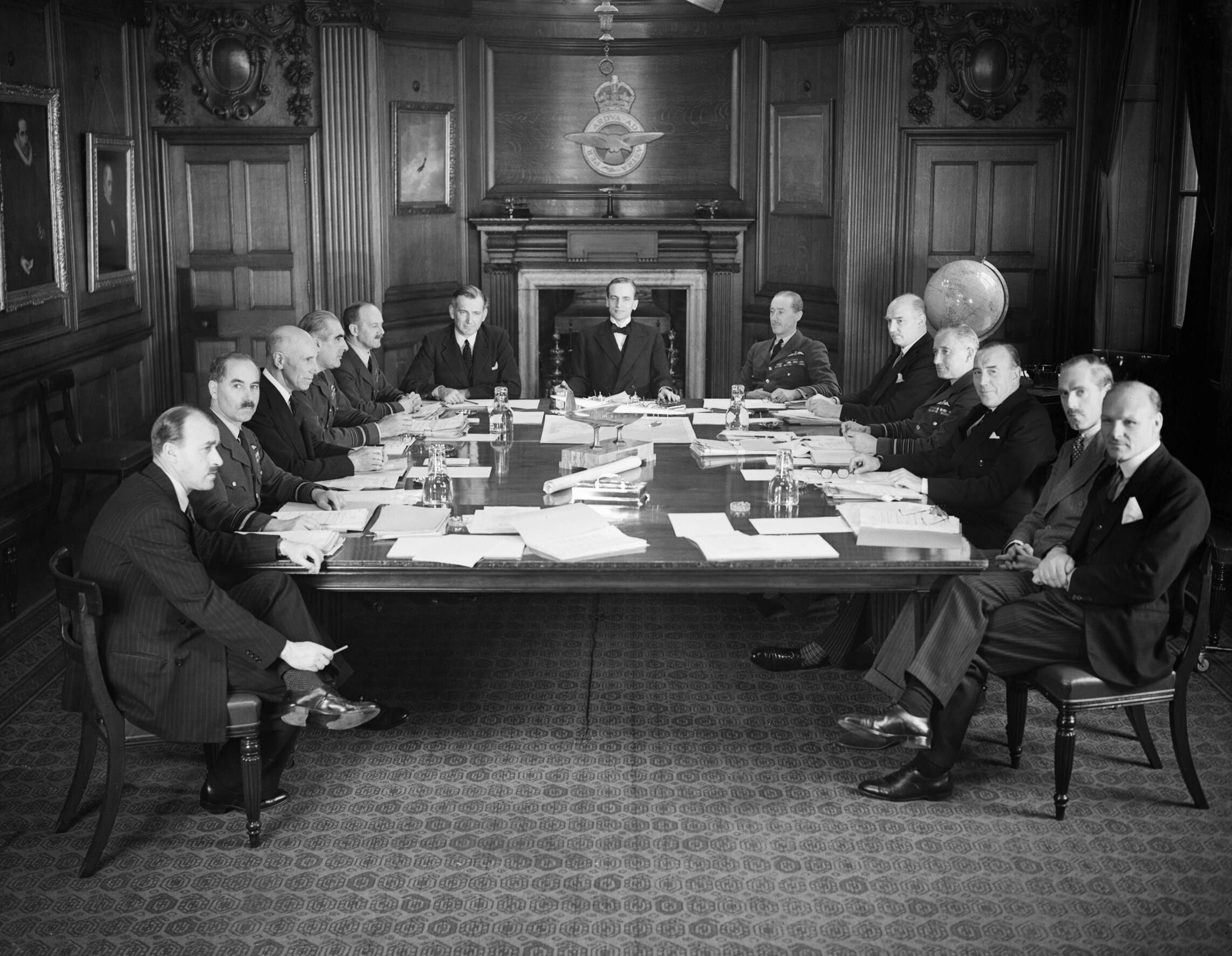
Air Council in session at the Air Ministry in July 1940.

The Secretary of State for Air was a secretary of state position in the British government that existed from 1919 to 1964. The person holding this position was in charge of the Air Ministry. The Secretary of State for Air was supported by the Under-Secretary of State for Air.

== History ==
The position was created on 10 January 1919 to manage the Royal Air Force. In 1946, the three posts of Secretary of State for War, First Lord of the Admiralty, and Secretary of State for Air became formally subordinated to that of Minister of Defence, which had itself been created in 1940 for the co-ordination of defence and security issues. On 1 April 1964, the Air Ministry was incorporated into the newly created united Ministry of Defence, and the position of Secretary of State for Air was abolished.

Principal political leaders of the English/British Armed Forces:
	Royal Navy	British Army	Royal Air Force	Co-ordination
1628	First Lord of the Admiralty (1628–1964)			
1794	First Lord of the Admiralty (1628–1964)	Secretary of State for War (1794–1801)		
1801	First Lord of the Admiralty (1628–1964)	Secretary of State for War and the Colonies (1801–1854)		
1854	First Lord of the Admiralty (1628–1964)	Secretary of State for War (1854–1964)		
1919	First Lord of the Admiralty (1628–1964)	Secretary of State for War (1854–1964)	Secretary of State for Air (1919–1964)	
1936	First Lord of the Admiralty (1628–1964)	Secretary of State for War (1854–1964)	Secretary of State for Air (1919–1964)	Minister for Co-ordination of Defence (1936–1940)
1940	First Lord of the Admiralty (1628–1964)	Secretary of State for War (1854–1964)	Secretary of State for Air (1919–1964)	Minister of Defence (1940–1964)
1964	Secretary of State for Defence (1964–present)			

== List of leaders ==
=== Chairman of the Joint War Air Committee, 1916 ===
Chairman	Term of office			Political party
Chairman	Took office	Left office	Time in office	Political party
Edward Stanley; 17th Earl of Derby	February; 1916	February; 1916 (Note: Resigned.)	7 months and 19 days	Conservative
=== Presidents of the Air Board, 1916–1917 ===
President	Term of office			Political party
President	Took office	Left office	Time in office	Political party
George Curzon; 1st Earl Curzon of Kedleston	15 May 1916	3 January 1917	10 months and 23 days	Conservative
Weetman Pearson; 1st Viscount Cowdray	3 January 1917	26 November 1917	10 months and 23 days	Liberal
=== Presidents of the Air Council, 1917–1919 ===
President	Term of office			Political party
President	Took office	Left office	Time in office	Political party
Harold Harmsworth; 1st Baron Rothermere	26 November 1917	26 April 1918	5 months	
William Weir; 1st Baron Weir	26 April 1918	10 January 1919	8 months and 15 days	
J. E. B. Seely; MP for Ilkeston	January; 1919	November; 1919	9 or 10 months	Conservative
=== Secretaries of State for Air, 1919–1964 ===
Secretary	Term of office			Political party
Secretary	Took office	Left office	Time in office	Political party
Winston Churchill (Note: Also Secretary of State for War.); MP for Dundee	10 January 1919	1 April 1921	2 years, 2 months and 22 days	Liberal
Frederick Edward Guest; MP for East Dorset	1 April 1921	19 October 1922	1 year, 6 months and 18 days	Liberal
Sir Samuel Hoare; MP for Chelsea	31 October 1922	22 January 1924	1 year, 2 months and 22 days	Conservative
Christopher Thomson; 1st Baron Thomson	22 January 1924	3 November 1924	9 months and 12 days	Labour
Sir Samuel Hoare; MP for Chelsea	6 November 1924	4 June 1929	4 years, 6 months and 29 days	Conservative
Christopher Thomson; 1st Baron Thomson	7 June 1929	5 October 1930†	1 year, 3 months and 28 days	Labour
William Mackenzie; 1st Baron Amulree	14 October 1930	5 November 1931	1 year and 22 days	Labour
Charles Vane-Tempest-Stewart; 7th Marquess of Londonderry	5 November 1931	7 June 1935	3 years, 7 months and 2 days	Conservative
Philip Cunliffe-Lister; 1st Viscount Swinton	7 June 1935	16 May 1938	2 years, 11 months and 9 days	Conservative
Sir Kingsley Wood; MP for Woolwich West	16 May 1938	3 April 1940	1 year, 10 months and 18 days	Conservative
Sir Samuel Hoare; MP for Chelsea	3 April 1940	11 May 1940	1 month and 8 days	Conservative
Sir Archibald Sinclair; MP for Caithness and Sutherland	11 May 1940	23 May 1945	5 years and 12 days	Liberal
Harold Macmillan; MP for Stockton-on-Tees	25 May 1945	26 July 1945	2 months and 1 day	Conservative
William Wedgwood Benn; 1st Viscount Stansgate	3 August 1945	4 October 1946	1 year, 2 months and 1 day	Labour
Philip Noel-Baker; MP for Derby	4 October 1946	7 October 1947	1 year and 3 days	Labour
Arthur Henderson; MP for Kingswinford before 1950; MP for Rowley Regis and Tipton after 1950	7 October 1947	26 October 1951	4 years and 19 days	Labour
William Sidney; 6th Baron De L'Isle and Dudley	31 October 1951	20 December 1955	4 years, 1 month and 20 days	Conservative
Nigel Birch; MP for West Flintshire	20 December 1955	16 January 1957	1 year and 27 days	Conservative
George Ward; MP for Worcester	16 January 1957	28 October 1960	3 years, 9 months and 12 days	Conservative
Julian Amery; MP for Preston North	28 October 1960	16 July 1962	1 year, 8 months and 18 days	Conservative
Hugh Fraser; MP for Stafford and Stone	16 July 1962	1 April 1964	1 year, 8 months and 16 days	Conservative
