= Royal Commission on Renewing and Strengthening Our Place in Canada =

Royal Commission in Newfoundland and Labrador (2002–2003)

- Commissioners: Victor L. Young (Chair); Elizabeth M. Davis; James Igloliorte
- Inquiry period: 19 April 2002 – 30 June 2003
- Authorized: Order in Council O.C. 2002-187

The Government of Newfoundland and Labrador announced the Royal Commission on Renewing and Strengthening Our Place in Canada on 19 March 2002, in the Speech from the Throne. On 19 April 2002, the appointment of commissioners Vic Young (chair), Sister Elizabeth Davis and judge James Igloliorte, were announced. The commissioners formally assumed their duties on 3 June 2002 and filed its final report on 30 June 2003.

The mandate of the Royal Commission was to conduct a critical assessment of Newfoundland and Labrador's strengths and weaknesses and to bring forward recommendations as to how they can renew and strengthen their place in Canada.
