= Anthony Parkhurst =

English explorer and promoter of English colonisation of North America

Anthony Parkhurst was an English explorer and promoter of English colonisation of North America in the 1570s and 1580s. He is best known for his early engagement in the English fishery off Newfoundland and his exploration of the island and its resources.

== Background ==
Parkhurst's date of birth is unknown, but given that he was in diplomatic service in Madrid by the mid 1560s, it seems unlikely he was born later than 1540 and he may have been born earlier. David Beers Quinn suggests he may have been the son of the gentleman John Parkhurst of East Lenham, Kent.

== John Hawkins' slaving voyage, 1564-5 ==
By 1564 Anthony Parkhurst was in the service of Sir Thomas Chaloner (English Ambassador in Madrid, 1561-64). In July 1564 Challoner received a request from the English mariner John Hawkins to recommend an interpreter. This was to accompany a state-sponsored slaving expedition down the coast of Africa, with the intention of selling the enslaved people to the Spanish colonists in America. Hawkins presumably wanted an interpreter with diplomatic skills and good Spanish to help negotiate with the colonial authorities in America. Chaloner recommended Parkhurst in a letter of 5 July 1564, which Parkhurst then carried back to England.

The participation of Anthony Parkhurst, gentleman, in Hawkins' voyage of 1564-5 is noted in a later report. The four-ship expedition left Plymouth in England on 18 October 1564, reaching West Africa by December-January. There Hawkins raided for slaves, while also buying enslaved people from Portuguese traders. Hawkins then sailed across to Venezuela, Hispaniola and other Spanish possessions in the Caribbean, selling enslaved Africans and other goods to the Spanish colonists. Although the colonists were keen to buy, it was against Spanish law for them to purchase any goods from foreign merchants - they were required to buy and sell solely through Seville. Hawkins had to engage in some difficult negotiations with Spanish colonial governors to persuade them to buy from him. Parkhurst presumably helped in these negotiations.

The expedition set sale for home in July 1565 via Florida and Newfoundland, where they took fish to provision the ships. It was on the Newfoundland Grand Banks that Parkhurst would have learnt first-hand about the fishery around the island. The fleet returned to Cornwall in September 1565.

It is not known whether Parkhurst sailed with Hawkins again or took part in any other overseas expeditions over the next eight years.

Anthony Parkhurst is next mentioned in the records of Queen Elizabeth I's Privy Council on 7 June 1573. In the hope of alleviating a family quarrel, the Justices of Assize in Kent were instructed to attempt 'to make an agrement betwixt Anthony Parkehurst and his father that meaneth to disinherit him'.

== Newfoundland ==
According to Quinn, following Parkhurst's argument with his father, 'he moved to Bristol and set up as a merchant'. From c.1575-8, Parkhurst engaged in summer fishing expeditions to Newfoundland, while also undertaking extensive surveys of the harbours, the land and the maritime resources around the island. In 1577-8, Parkhurst wrote a letter to a senior figure he had met at Queen Elizabeth's court, setting out his case for the colonisation of Newfoundland by England.

On 13 November 1578, Parkhurst wrote a letter to Richard Hakluyt the elder, the cousin and guardian of the younger Richard Hakluyt, who would go on to be the leading historian and promoter of English discovery voyages. This letter would later be published in 1589 in Hakluyt's key work, Principal Navigations Voyages Traffiques And Discoveries Of The English Nation. Parkhurst's long letter provided detailed information about the nature of the European fishery around Newfoundland, as practiced by the English, French, Spanish, Basques and Portuguese, including estimates of the number of ships involved and their size. Parkhurst also provided much information about the island and in its resources. He claims to have explored 'the harbors, creekes and havens, and also the land much more than ever any Englishman hath done'. He had even experimented with planting various food crops, such as wheat, barley and peas, to prove that they could grow there.

Parkhurst's two letters are regarded as the most important documentary sources on the early English fishery in Newfoundland, which had, according to him, increased from just 3-4 vessels in the early 1570s to 50 vessels by 1578. The fleet would grow to 200 vessels by 1603. Prof Quinn characterised Parkhurst as 'An intelligent and well-informed commentator, he was, with Edward Hayes, Newfoundland’s most important early publicist.' The expansion of the English fishery was followed by colonisation of Newfoundland from 1610 by John Guy of Bristol and others.

Parkhurst's 1578 voyage incurred losses, because salt deliveries he expected to receive from Portuguese fishermen did not materialise. Large quantities of salt was need to preserve the codfish before carrying it back to Europe.

It is not known whether Parkhurst engaged in further voyages. However, in 1583 he wrote a 'commendation', in verse, in praise of Sir George Peckham’s A True Reporte of the late discoveries, and possession...of the Newfound Landes by Humphrey Gilbert.

== Later life ==
Historians have found no records concerning Anthony Parkhurst after 1583. The nature, place and time of his death is unknown.
