= William Mackenzie, 1st Baron Amulree =

Baron in the peerage of the United Kingdom

The Right Honourable The Lord Amulree GBE PC KC
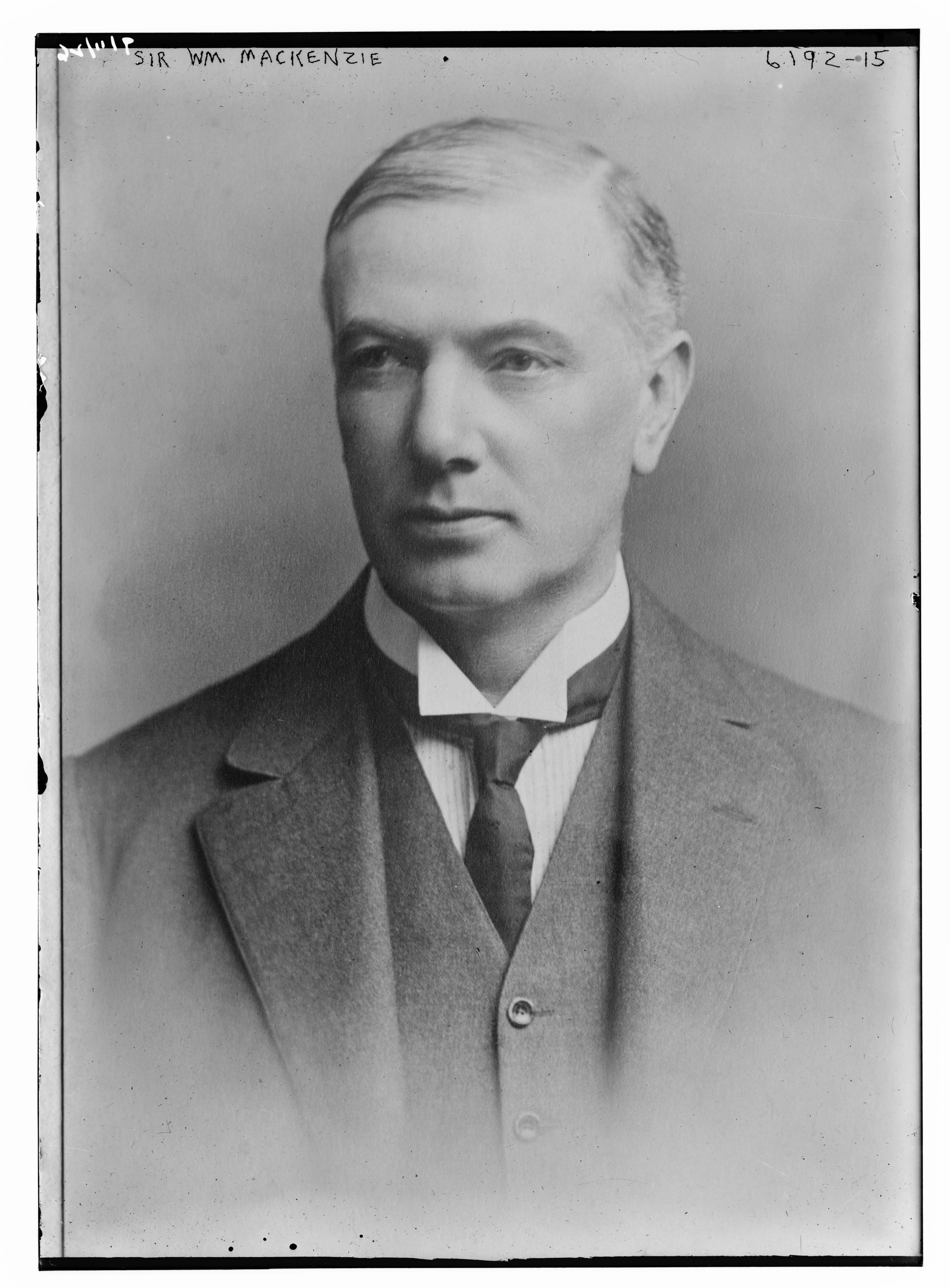

Secretary of State for Air
- In office 14 October 1930 – 5 November 1931
- Monarch: George V
- Prime Minister: Ramsay MacDonald
- Preceded by: The Lord Thomson
- Succeeded by: The Marquess of Londonderry

Personal details
- Born: William Warrender Mackenzie; 19 August 1860
- Died: 5 May 1942 (aged 81)
- Party: National Labour
- Other political affiliations: Labour
- Spouse: Lilian Bradbury (m. 1897; died 1916)
- Children: Basil
- Education: University of Edinburgh

William Warrender Mackenzie, 1st Baron Amulree (19 August 1860 – 5 May 1942), known as Sir William Mackenzie between 1918 and 1929, was a British barrister, public servant and Labour (later National Labour) politician. He served as Secretary of State for Air under Ramsay MacDonald between 1930 and 1931.

He later chaired the Newfoundland Royal Commission, which reported on the future governance of the Dominion of Newfoundland.

== Early life ==
Amulree was the son of Robert (Robin) Mackenzie, of Scone, Perthshire, and Jean, daughter of Basil Menzies. He was educated at the University of Edinburgh and was called to the Bar from Lincoln's Inn in 1886.

== Public career ==
Mackenzie published The Overseer's Handbook in 1889 and became a King's Counsel in 1914. In 1918 he became Chairman of the Committee on Production, a position he held until 1919. He was then President of the Industrial Court between 1919 and 1926 and Chairman of the National Wages Board for Railways between 1920 and 1926, of the Industrial Delegation to Canada and the USA between 1926 and 1927, and of the Departmental Committee on the Shop Hours Act 1927. In the 1926 Birthday Honours he was promoted within the Order of the British Empire to be a Knight Grand Cross (GBE).

== Political career ==
In 1929 Mackenzie was raised to the peerage as Baron Amulree, of Strathbraan in the County of Perth, giving him a seat in the House of Lords and the possibility of joining the government. In October 1930, he was appointed as Secretary of State for Air in Ramsay MacDonald's second Labour government, succeeding the deceased Lord Thomson, with a seat in the cabinet, and at the same time was sworn into the Privy Council. He was one of the few Labour politicians to follow MacDonald into the coalition National Government, in which he kept his post, although not his seat on the Cabinet, until the reconstruction of the government after the November 1931 general election.

In 1933, Amulree chaired the Newfoundland Royal Commission, which prepared a report on the future of Newfoundland as a dominion of the British Empire.

== Personal life ==
Amulree married Lilian, daughter of William Hardwick Bradbury, in 1897. They had a son, Basil, born in South Kensington, London on 25 July 1900.

Lilian died at Cheam, Surrey in June 1916. After her death, Amulree endowed a library in her memory at Perth Academy. It is known as the Lady Mackenzie Library, despite the fact she died before her husband was elevated to the peerage and so never enjoyed the title herself. In 2019, the author Ajay Close worked with Perth Academy students to produce a play about the life of Lilian Mackenzie.

Amulree died in May 1942, aged 81, and was succeeded in the barony by his son Basil, who became a distinguished physician.

== Honours ==
In 1917 Amulree was appointed as a Commander of the Order of the British Empire (CBE) and in 1918 promoted in the same Order to a Knight Commander (KBE), making him Sir William Mackenzie.

Coat of arms of William Mackenzie, 1st Baron Amulree
Crest A dexter cubit arm charged with a thistle leaved and slipped and grasping in the hand a sword point upwards Proper pommel and hilt Or. Escutcheon Azure a stag's head caboshed Or on a chief Ermine a rose Gules barbed and seeded Proper between two millrinds of the second. Supporters On either side an eagle reguardant Proper collared Or that on the dexter holding in the beak a sprig of mountain ash fruit Proper and that on the sinister a sprig of myrtle also fruited Proper. Motto I to the Hills

Political offices
Preceded by The Lord Thomson	Secretary of State for Air; 1930–1931	Succeeded by The Marquess of Londonderry
Peerage of the United Kingdom
New creation	Baron Amulree; 1929–1942	Succeeded by Basil Mackenzie
