= 2014 Progressive Conservative Party of Newfoundland and Labrador leadership election =

- September 13, 2014
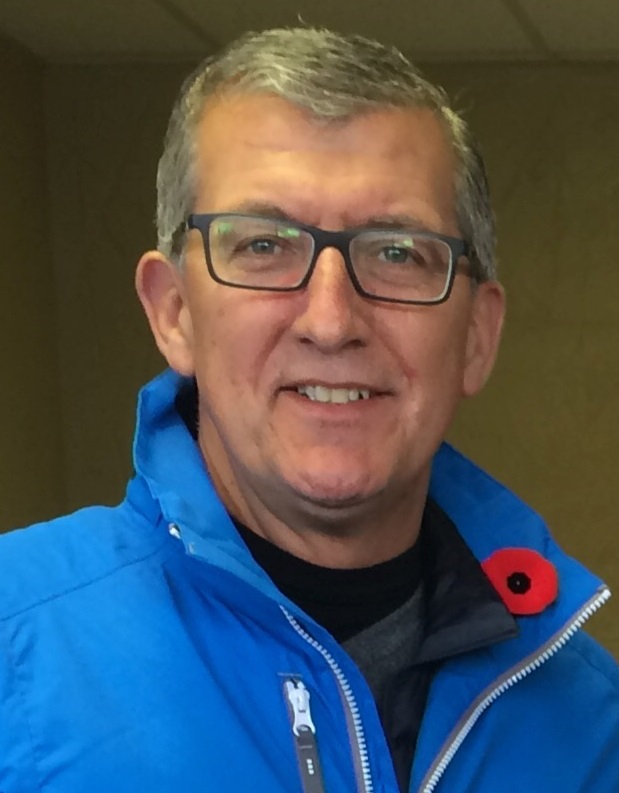

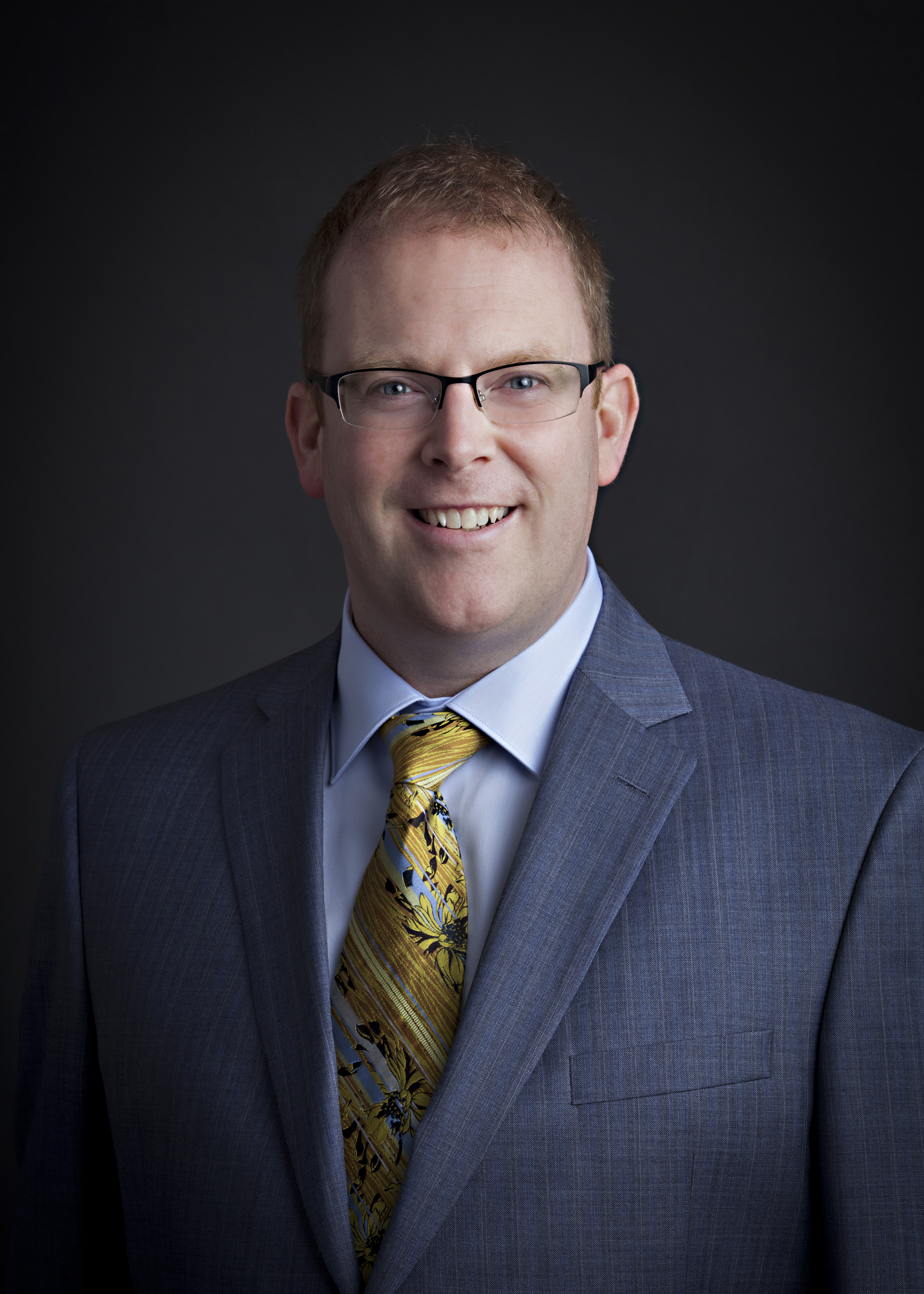
		JO
Candidate	Paul Davis	John Ottenheimer	Steve Kent
Final ballot	351 (51.8%)	326 (48.1%)	Eliminated
First ballot	253 (37.0%)	289 (42.3%)	141 (20.7%)
Leader before election
Tom Marshall
Elected Leader
Paul Davis

2014 Progressive Conservative Party of Newfoundland and Labrador leadership election
- Date: September 12–13, 2014 (postponed from July 4–5, 2014)
- Convention: St. John's, Newfoundland and Labrador
- Resigning leader: Kathy Dunderdale
- Won by: Paul Davis
- Ballots: 3
- Candidates: 3
- Entrance fee: $10,000
- Spending limit: $350,000

The 2014 Progressive Conservative Party of Newfoundland and Labrador leadership election was prompted by Kathy Dunderdale's announcement on January 22, 2014, that she was resigning as premier and party leader. On January 24, 2014, Tom Marshall was sworn in as the 11th Premier of Newfoundland and Labrador and interim leader of the Progressive Conservative Party. Prior to the nomination deadline, three accredited candidates entered the race; Frank Coleman, Bill Barry, and Wayne Bennett. On April 3, Bennett was removed from the race while on April 17, Barry voluntarily withdrew his nomination, resulting in Frank Coleman becoming leader-designate.

Coleman was to officially become office leader on July 5, and subsequently premier, however, he never took either office after abruptly announcing on June 16, 2014 that he was leaving politics due to an unspecified "significant and challenging family matter." As a result of Coleman's withdrawal, the leadership race was postponed until September 13, 2014.

Paul Davis won the election on the third ballot. On the second ballot, Davis lead John Ottenheimer by a single vote. However, due to one spoiled ballot, Davis had not received "more than 50 per cent of the valid ballots cast", as required by the party constitution. A third ballot was required; Davis won a clear majority of ballots cast on that final ballot.

== Timing ==
On January 22, 2014, Kathy Dunderdale announced she was resigning as Premier of Newfoundland and Labrador and leader of the Progressive Conservative Party (PC Party) later that week. Dunderdale asked her Minister of Finance Tom Marshall to replace her as premier and PC Party leader until the party could select a new leader. Marshall accepted the offer and on January 24, 2014, he was sworn in as the province's 11th Premier. Marshall had previously indicated that he would not be seeking re-election as the member of the House of Assembly for Humber East and therefore would not contest the leadership of the Progressive Conservative Party.

The party announced on February 5, 2014, that Sheila Kelly-Blackmore and Tommy Williams would serve as co-chairs of the leadership convention committee, and that the convention would be held on July 4–5, 2014. On February 14, the co-chairs announced that nominations would open on February 19, and close March 14, 2014.

As a result of Frank Coleman's withdrawal, the leadership race had been postponed until September 13, 2014, with candidates able to be nominated between June 23, 2014 and July 7, 2014, and delegates being chosen over a one-month period ending August 14, 2014.

== Candidates ==
=== Paul Davis ===
MHA for Topsail (2010–2018), Minister of Health and Community Services (2014), Minister of Child, Youth, and Family Services (2013-2014), Minister of Transportation and Works (2012-2013), Minister of Service NL (2011-2012), Legislative Assistant for the Department of Municipal Affairs (2010-2011), Deputy Mayor of Conception Bay South (2005-2010)

MHAs: (13) Sandy Collins (Terra Nova, Minister of Child, Youth and Family Services); Tony Cornect (Port au Port, Minister of Tourism, Culture and Recreation); Eli Cross (Bonavista North); Derrick Dalley (The Isles of Notre Dame, Minister of Natural Resources); Terry French (Conception Bay South, Minister of Justice); Vaughn Granter (Humber East, Minister of Environment and Conservation); Keith Hutchings (Ferryland, Minister of Fisheries and Aquaculture); Darin King (Grand Bank, Minister of Education); Glen Little (Bonavista North); Glenn Littlejohn (Port de Grave); Kevin Parsons (Cape St. Francis); Kevin Pollard (Baie Verte-Springdale); Wade Verge (Lewisporte);
Former MHAs: (7) John Butt (Topsail 1979-1989, former cabinet minister) Roger Fitzgerald (Bonavista South 1993-2011, former Speaker of the House of Assembly of Newfoundland and Labrador); Joe Goudie (Lake Melville 1975–1985, former cabinet minister); John Hickey (Lake Melville, 2003-2011, former cabinet minister), Paul Oram (Terra Nova 2003-2011, former cabinet minister); Milton Peach (Carbonear 1982-1989, former cabinet minister); Loyola Sullivan (Ferryland 1992-2006, former interim leader and cabinet minister)
Federal politicians: (1) Peter Penashue (Labrador 2011-2013, and former cabinet minister)
Municipal politicians:
Date campaign launched: July 2, 2014

=== Steve Kent ===
MHA for Mount Pearl North (2007–2017), Minister of Municipal and Intergovernmental Affairs, Minister Responsible for Fire and Emergency Services – Newfoundland and Labrador, and Registrar General (2013-2014), Minister Responsible for the Office of Public Engagement (2014), Parliamentary Secretary to the Minister Responsible for the Office of Public Engagement (2012-2013), Parliamentary Secretary to the Minister Responsible for the Forestry and Agrifoods Agency (2010-2011), Mayor of Mount Pearl (2003-2007), Deputy Mayor of Mount Pearl (1997-2003)

MHAs: (6) David Brazil (Conception Bay East – Bell Island, Minister of Service NL); Felix Collins (Placentia—St. Mary's, Attorney General); Clyde Jackman (Burin-Placentia West, Minister of Health and Community Services); Calvin Peach (Bellevue); Tracey Perry (Fortune Bay-Cape La Hune); Keith Russell (Lake Melville)
Former MHAs: (6) Dave Denine (Mount Pearl South 2003-2011, former cabinet minister); Shannie Duff (Signal Hill-Quidi Vidi 1989-1990); Harvey Hodder (Waterford Valley, former Speaker of the House of Assembly); Terry Loder (Bay of Islands 2007-2011); Bill Matthews (Grand Bank 1982–1996, former cabinet minister, former MP Random—Burin—St. George's 1997-2008); Joan Shea (St. George's-Stephenville East 2003-2014, former cabinet minister)
Federal politicians:
Municipal politicians: (2) Colin Vardy (Mayor of Wabush); Mark Lane (former Deputy Mayor of Holyrood)
Date campaign launched: July 3, 2014

=== John Ottenheimer ===
Former MHA for St. John's East (1996-2007), Minister of Intergovernmental Affairs (2006-2007), Minister of Health and Community Services (2004-2006), Minister of Education (2003-2004).

MHAs: (8): Dan Crummell, John Dinn, Clayton Forsey, Tom Hedderson, Charlene Johnson, Nick McGrath, Kevin O'Brien, Susan Sullivan
Former MHAs: (11) Ed Buckingham, John Carter, Glen Greening, Harry Harding, Bill Marshall, Patty Pottle, Bob Ridgley, Paul Shelley, Shawn Skinner, Trevor Taylor, Wallace Young
High profile supporters: Ron Ellsworth, Dennis O'Keefe, David Wells
Date campaign launched: June 16, 2014

== Withdrawn ==
=== Bill Barry ===
Chief Executive Officer of the Barry Group Incorporated.

Caucus supporters:
High profile supporters: Charlie Oliver, CEO of Martek;
Date campaign registered: January 29, 2014
Date campaign withdrawn: April 17, 2014

=== Frank Coleman ===
CEO of the Coleman Group of Companies. Following the withdrawal of Bill Barry and removal of Wayne Bennett, Coleman was declared the winner by acclamation before subsequently withdrawing himself before officially being named leader.

Caucus supporters: Charlene Johnson, MHA Trinity-Bay de Verde and Minister of Finance and President of the Treasury Board; Steve Kent, MHA for Mount Pearl North and Minister of Municipal and Intergovernmental Affairs;
High profile supporters: Danny Breen, St. John's City Councillor and PC Party candidate in Virginia Waters;
Date campaign registered: March 14, 2014
Date campaign withdrawn: June 16, 2014

== Disqualified ==
=== Wayne Bennett ===
Former leader of the Newfoundland and Labrador First Party. Expelled for violating party principles.

Caucus supporters:
High profile supporters:
Date campaign registered: March 14, 2014
Date campaign removed: April 3, 2014

== Potential candidates who did not run ==
- Clarence Cantwell, Ultramar employee.
- Ches Crosbie, St. John's lawyer. Elected leader in 2018.
- Derrick Dalley, Minister of Natural Resources
- Keith Hutchings, Minister of Fisheries and Aquaculture
- Darin King, Minister of Justice
- Fabian Manning, Conservative Senator
- Tim Powers, vice-chairman of Summa Strategies
- Charlie Oliver, CEO of Martek
- Paul Oram, MHA Terra Nova (2003-2009), former minister of Health and Business
- Kevin Pollard, MHA Baie Verte-Springdale (2008–present)
- Shawn Skinner, MHA St. John's South (2003-2011), and former Minister of Natural Resources
- Susan Sullivan, Minister of Innovation, Business and Rural Development

== Results ==
Despite Paul Davis winning the most votes on the second round of balloting, he could not be declared the winner without "more than 50 per cent of the valid ballots cast" (i.e. 341 of the 680 cast) due to one spoiled ballot. A third ballot was required; Davis won a clear majority of votes cast on this final ballot.

= Eliminated from next round
= Winner

Delegate support by ballot
Candidate	Ballot 1	Ballot 2		Ballot 3	
Name	Votes	Votes	+/- (pp)	Votes	+/- (pp)
Paul Davis	253; 37.0%	340; 50.0%	+13.0%	351; 51.8%	+1.8%
John Ottenheimer	289; 42.3%	339; 49.9%	+7.6%	326; 48.1%	-1.7%
Steve Kent	141; 20.7%	Endorsed Davis			
Votes cast and net change by ballot
Total	683	680	-3	678	-2
