= Philip J. Lewis =

Newfoundland-Canadian politician (1900–1985)

The Honourable Philip J. Lewis KC

Minister without portfolio
- In office December 15, 1951 – July 3, 1971
- Premier: Joey Smallwood
- In office 1928–1932
- Prime Minister: Richard Squires
Legislative offices
Member of the Newfoundland House of Assembly for Harbour Main Harbour Main-Bell Island (1951–1956)
In office November 26, 1951 – October 28, 1971 Serving with David Jackman (1951–1956); Matthew Whelan (1956–1959); Albert Furey (1959–1962); Clifton Joy (1962–1966); John W. Mahoney (1966–1971)
Preceded by	Ronald Fahey
Succeeded by	Gordon Dawe; William Doody
In office October 29, 1928 – June 11, 1932 Serving with Albert Walsh
Preceded by	Cyril J. Cahill; William Woodford
Succeeded by	William J. Browne; Charles J. Furey
Member of the Newfoundland House of Assembly for Placentia-St. Mary's
In office June 11, 1932 – February 16, 1934
Preceded by	Edward Emerson (as MHA for Placentia East)
Succeeded by	Leonard J. Miller (post-Confederation)

Personal details
- Born: November 28, 1900 Holyrood, Newfoundland Colony
- Died: August 16, 1985 (aged 84) St. John's, Newfoundland, Canada
- Party: Liberal (1928–1932, 1951–1971); United Newfoundland (1932–1934)
- Spouse: Ella Roche
- Education: Saint Bonaventure's College; Dalhousie University
- Occupation: Lawyer

Philip J. Lewis (November 28, 1900 – August 16, 1985) was a lawyer and politician in the Dominion of Newfoundland and later the Province of Newfoundland. He represented Harbour Main from 1928 to 1932 as a Liberal, Placentia and St. Mary's from 1932 to 1934 as a member of the United Newfoundland Party and Harbour Main-Bell Island from 1951 to 1971 as a Liberal in the Newfoundland and Labrador House of Assembly.

He was born in Holyrood, the son of John Lewis and Elizabeth Veitch, and was educated at Saint Bonaventure's College and Dalhousie University. Lewis was called to the Newfoundland bar in 1926 and set up practice in St. John's. He served in the Executive Council of Richard Squires as a minister without portfolio. Lewis married Ella Roche. In 1940, he was named King's Counsel. Lewis served in Joey Smallwood's cabinet as a minister without portfolio from 1951 to 1971. In 1971, he left politics and continued to practice law, retiring shortly before his death in St. John's in 1985.
