= Albert Furey =

Canadian politician

Member of the Newfoundland and Labrador House of Assembly for Harbour Main
- In office 1959–1962 Serving with Philip J. Lewis
- Preceded by: Matthew Whelan
- Succeeded by: Clifton Joseph Joy

Personal details
- Born: September 26, 1911 Harbour Grace, Dominion of Newfoundland
- Died: April 23, 2001 (aged 89) Harbour Main, Newfoundland and Labrador, Canada
- Party: Progressive Conservative Party of Newfoundland and Labrador
- Occupation: Businessman

Albert E. Furey (September 26, 1911 – April 23, 2001) was a Canadian politician who was elected to the Newfoundland and Labrador House of Assembly in the 1959 provincial election. He represented the electoral district of Harbour Main as a member of the Progressive Conservative Party of Newfoundland and Labrador. He lived in Harbour Main.
