= Steve Kent (politician) =

Canadian politician

The Honourable Steve Kent ECNL
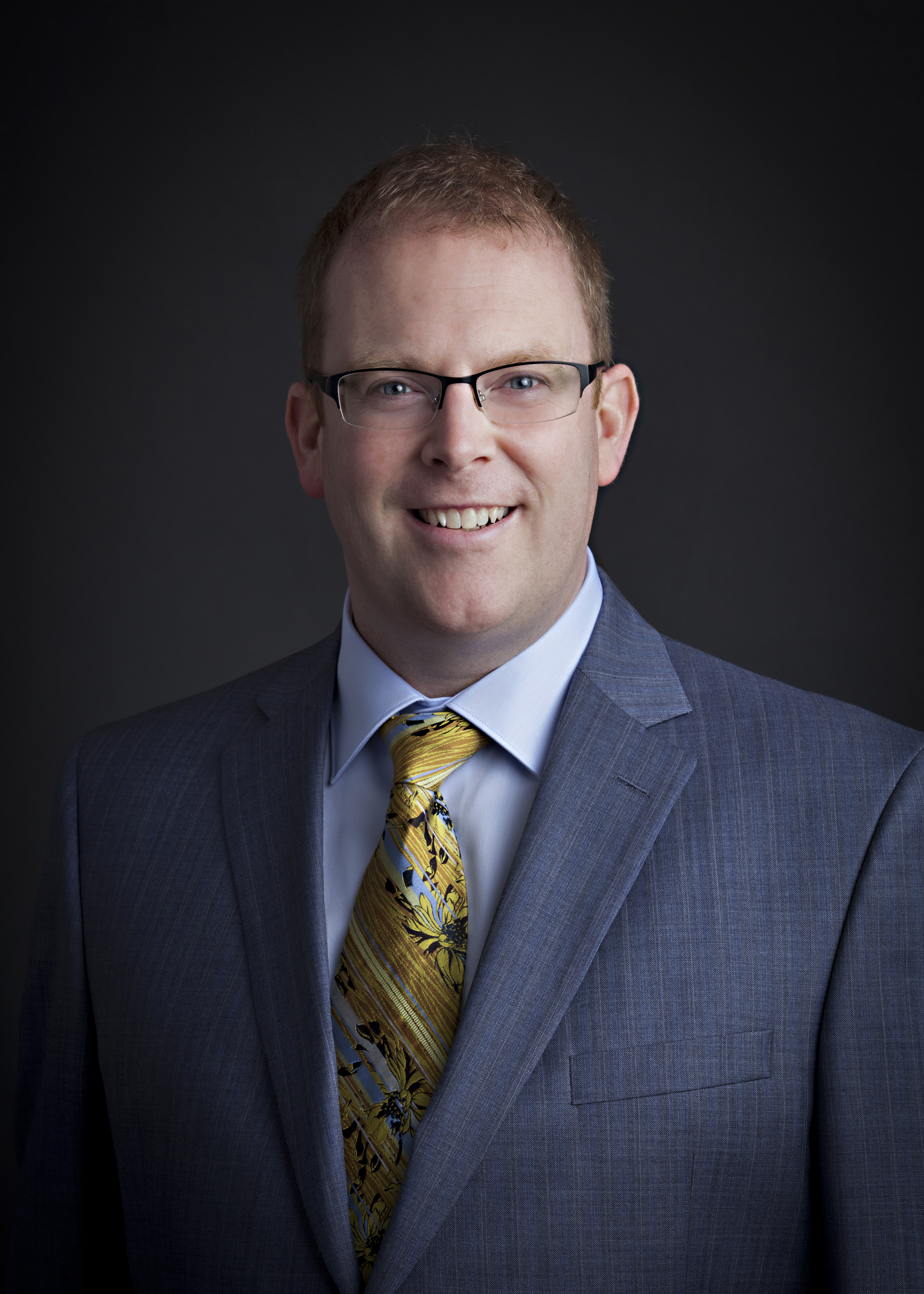

Member of the Newfoundland and Labrador House of Assembly for Mount Pearl North
- In office 1 November 2007 – 11 October 2017
- Preceded by: Harvey Hodder
- Succeeded by: Jim Lester

Deputy Premier of Newfoundland and Labrador
- In office 30 September 2014 – 13 December 2015
- Preceded by: Kathy Dunderdale
- Succeeded by: Siobhán Coady

Minister of Health and Community Services
- In office 30 September 2014 – 13 December 2015
- Preceded by: Clyde Jackman
- Succeeded by: John Haggie

Minister of Municipal and Intergovernmental Affairs
- In office 9 October 2013 – 3 July 2014
- Preceded by: Kevin O'Brien
- Succeeded by: Dan Crummell

Registrar General
- In office 9 October 2013 – 3 July 2014
- Preceded by: Kevin O'Brien
- Succeeded by: Clyde Jackman

8th Mayor of Mount Pearl
- In office October 2003 – 30 October 2007
- Preceded by: Dave Denine
- Succeeded by: Randy Simms

Councillor/Deputy Mayor of Mount Pearl
- In office October 1997 – October 2003
- Succeeded by: Randy Simms

Personal details
- Born: 7 May 1978 (age 48) Stephenville, Newfoundland and Labrador, Canada
- Party: Conservative Party of Canada; Progressive Conservative Party of Newfoundland and Labrador
- Spouse: Janet Kent
- Children: 3 (Benjamin, Ciaran, Samuel)
- Education: Memorial University of Newfoundland, McGill University
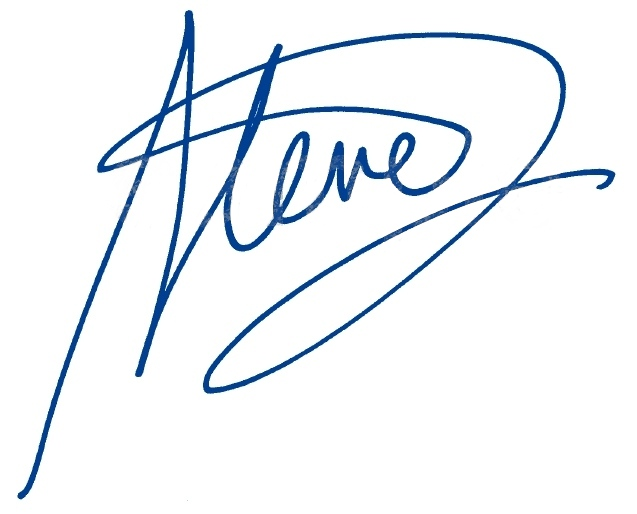
- Signature
- Website: stevekent.ca

Stephen Kent (born 7 May 1978) is a Canadian entrepreneur and non-profit executive. Kent served as the former Mayor of Mount Pearl, former Deputy Premier of Newfoundland and Labrador, and former Minister of Municipal and Intergovernmental Affairs.

After serving as the mayor and deputy mayor of Mount Pearl, he was elected as the member of the House of Assembly for Mount Pearl North in 2007. Kent was a cabinet minister in the administrations of premiers Kathy Dunderdale, Tom Marshall, and Paul Davis.

Kent was appointed as the Chief Administrative Officer (CAO) of Mount Pearl in October 2017, and he subsequently left the House of Assembly. He resigned as CAO in 2020 amid investigations relating to his workplace conduct. He unsuccessfully ran in the 2025 Canadian federal election in the district of Avalon.

== Background ==
Kent was born in Stephenville before his family moved to Mount Pearl in 1980. He attended O'Donel High School, where he had held the position of student council president, and graduated in 1996. In 2001, he completed a bachelor's degree in business administration with a Certificate in public administration at Memorial University of Newfoundland. Two years later in May 2003, he received his master's degree in management from McGill University in Montreal.

== Federal politics ==
In March 2000, Kent announced he was seeking the Liberal Party of Canada nomination for a by-election to be held in the riding of St. John's West. His nomination campaign was supported by fellow Mount Pearl City Councillor Lucy Stoyles. After his announcement, The Telegram published a string of emails which revealed that Kent had been considering seeking the Canadian Alliance nomination in the riding and had been thinking of asking the party to conduct a poll gauging public opinion on him running under their label. Kent responded by telling The Telegram that he thought the Canadian Alliance were too right-wing, and he affirmed that he "support[ed] the work that the Liberal governments are doing." Anthony Sparrow went on to win the Liberal nomination for the by-election. Kent, who reportedly came a close second in the nomination, conceded by declaring that he would "be working for Mr. Sparrow first thing in the morning."

Kent was a delegate from St. John's South—Mount Pearl at the 2006 federal Liberal leadership convention in Montreal. On 5 December 2006, Kent donated $425 to the Liberal Party of Canada.

== Provincial politics ==
Progressive Conservative member of the House of Assembly (MHA) Harvey Hodder opted not to run for re-election in the 2007 Newfoundland and Labrador general election. Kent announced his intentions to seek the PC nomination in the new district of Mount Pearl North. On 19 June 2007, he was elected as the Progressive Conservative candidate for the provincial election, taking 1,151 of 1,352 votes, over the only other contestant, Keith Cassell. In the subsequent general election, he was elected MHA for the electoral district of Mount Pearl North with 85% of the popular vote in the 9 October 2007, provincial election. On 30 October 2007, he resigned as Mayor of Mount Pearl in order to be sworn in as MHA.

On 13 October 2010, Kent was named Parliamentary Secretary to the Minister Responsible for the Forestry and Agrifoods Agency. Kent was re-elected as the MHA for Mount Pearl North on 11 October 2011. In October 2013, Kent was named Minister of Municipal and Intergovernmental Affairs, Minister Responsible for Fire and Emergency Services and Registrar General. In January 2014, in addition to those portfolios he was also named Minister Responsible for the Office of Public Engagement. Kent resigned from his Cabinet positions on 3 July 2014, and ran as a candidate for leadership of the provincial Progressive Conservative Party, to succeed Kathy Dunderdale. He placed third with 20.7% of the vote and was eliminated on the first ballot.

On 30 September 2014, Kent was named Deputy Premier, Minister of Health and Community Services, and Minister Responsible for the Office of Public Engagement. His cabinet responsibilities ended upon the swearing in of the new Liberal cabinet after change in government on 13 December 2015.

In the 2015 election, Kent was re-elected, defeating Liberal candidate Mount Pearl Mayor Randy Simms. In September 2017, Kent announced that he would resign his seat to become chief administrative officer of the City of Mount Pearl that took effect on 11 October.

== Post-provincial politics ==
Kent became chief administrative officer of the City of Mount Pearl in October 2017, In October 2019, following complaints by several municipal workers, Kent was placed on administrative leave as investigations were made into his workplace interactions with city staff. He resigned as CAO on 25 June 2020, days after the City Council of Mount Pearl tabled a motion to dismiss him from the position. Allegations made in the case included that Kent had mocked subordinates in front of other staff and berated workers verbally. In 2019, it was alleged Kent used a city-hired consultant for personal work related to his volunteer work with outside organizations; Kent stated it did not cost the City. In June 2020, Mount Pearl Municipal Workers Union CUPE Local 2099 asked for a formal response to their letter of concern on the investigation into Kent. In 2023, the city shared they had spent over $325,000 on professional fees and further undisclosed legal fees related to the investigation into the former CAO. As of March 2025, there was ongoing litigation between the city and Kent related to his departure. The court of appeal allowed an appeal from the City of Mount Pearl and returned matter to the trial court.

In August 2024, Kent was elected a voting member of the World Scout Committee by the World Scout Conference for a three-year term.

== Attempted return to federal politics ==
In 2025, Kent was nominated to be the Conservative candidate for the district of Avalon. The sudden appointment was made in the midst of an ongoing nomination contest. Kent faced pushback and controversy in media and online. An image of Kent wearing a MAGA hat resurfaced causing controversy over the fact that Trump administration had been threatening tariffs on Canada for several weeks at that point. In 2016, he said his photo was a joke for friends. In 2025, Kent said it was a "photoshopped image." He was defeated by Liberal Paul Connors, placing a distant second.

== Electoral history ==
2025 Canadian federal election: Avalon
Party	Candidate	Votes	%	±%	Expenditures
Liberal	Paul Connors	27,563	58.61	+7.73	$65,090.03
Conservative	Steve Kent	16,953	36.05	+3.01	$125,003.56
New Democratic	Judy Vanta	2,284	4.86	−9.39	$0.00
Rhinoceros	Alexander Tilley	230	0.49	N/A	$0.00
Total valid votes/expense limit		47,030	99.18	-0.10	$127,183.68
Total rejected ballots		389	0.82	+0.10	
Turnout		47,419	66.92		
Eligible voters		70,859			
Liberal notional hold		Swing		+2.36	
Source: Elections Canada

2015 Newfoundland and Labrador general election
Party	Candidate	Votes	%	±%
Progressive Conservative	Steve Kent	3120		
Liberal	Randy Simms	2571		
New Democratic	Cameron Mercer-Maillet	370		
Total valid votes				

2011 Newfoundland and Labrador general election
Party	Candidate	Votes	%	±%
Progressive Conservative	Steve Kent	3,727	73.31%	–
NDP	Kurtis Coombs	994	19.55%	
Liberal	Maurice Budgell	363	7.14%	

2007 Newfoundland and Labrador general election
Party	Candidate	Votes	%	±%
Progressive Conservative	Steve Kent	4,751	85.05%	–
Liberal	Elaine Reid	516	9.24%	
NDP	Janice Lockyer	319	5.71%	

Progressive Conservative Party of Newfoundland and Labrador nomination, June 19, 2007
Party	Candidate	Votes	%	±%
Progressive Conservative	Steve Kent	1,151	85.45%	–
Progressive Conservative	Keith Cassell	196	14.55%	
