= John Ottenheimer =

Canadian politician

Member of the Newfoundland and Labrador House of Assembly for St. John's East
- In office 1996–2007
- Preceded by: Hubert Kitchen
- Succeeded by: Ed Buckingham

Minister of Intergovernmental Affairs, Minister Responsible for Emergency Prepardness, Registrar General, Minister of Municipal Affairs, And Minister of Natural Resources of Newfoundland and Labrador
- In office March 14, 2006 – 2007
- Preceded by: Tom Marshall
- Succeeded by: Tom Hedderson

Minister of Health and Community Services of Newfoundland and Labrador
- In office October 1, 2004 – March 14, 2006
- Preceded by: Elizabeth Marshall
- Succeeded by: Tom Osborne

Minister of Education, And Minister of Youth services and post secondary education of Newfoundland and Labrador
- In office November 6, 2003 – October 1, 2004
- Preceded by: Gerry Reid
- Succeeded by: Tom Hedderson

Personal details
- Born: 1953 (age 72–73) St. John's, Newfoundland, Canada
- Party: Progressive Conservative
- Spouse: Helen Conway-Ottenheimer
- Occupation: Educator and Lawyer

John Ottenheimer (born in 1953) is a Canadian lawyer and politician in Newfoundland and Labrador, Canada. Ottenheimer is a former Cabinet minister in the government of Danny Williams and represented the district of St. John's East for the Progressive Conservative Party from 1996 to 2007. He unsuccessfully ran for the leadership of the Progressive Conservatives in 2014 losing to Paul Davis.

Between 2003 and 2007, Ottenheimer served as the Minister of Intergovernmental Affairs, the Minister of Health and Community Services, and as the Minister of Education. He also briefly served as acting Minister of Municipal Affairs and acting Minister of Natural Resources. He left provincial politics in 2007 and was later appointed chairman of Newfoundland and Labrador Hydro.

== Background ==
Ottenheimer was born in St. John's, Newfoundland in 1953. He is the younger half-brother of former Progressive Conservative leader and Canadian Senator Gerry Ottenheimer. In 1974, he graduated from Memorial University of Newfoundland with a Bachelor of Arts degree and a Bachelor of Education Degree. He would later receive a graduate diploma and his Masters of Education. After working as a high school teacher in St. John's and as a principal throughout the province, he decided to go back to school and become a lawyer. in 1982, Ottenheimer received his Bachelor of Laws degree from the University of Windsor. Ottenheimer practised law in St. John's; he was also a lecturer in property law at Cabot College and a lecturer in Law and Education at the Faculty of Education of Memorial University. His wife Helen Conway-Ottenheimer was elected in the 2019 provincial election in the district of Harbour Main.

== Provincial politics ==
=== Opposition MHA ===
In the 1996 provincial election, Ottenheimer defeated Liberal incumbent Hubert Kitchen in the district of St. John's East, winning the seat for the Progressive Conservatives. His win came despite the Liberals winning an overwhelming majority government and the PC Party losing seven seats from the previous election. Ottenheimer was easily re-elected in the district in the 1999 general election. From 1996 to 2003, Ottenheimer served in opposition and was a critic for a number of ministries. Ottenheimer had considered running for the party's leadership following the 1996 and 1999 general elections, but did not enter either race.

=== Minister of Education ===
Ottenheimer was re-elected in the 2003 provincial election and the Progressive Conservatives won a majority government under Danny Williams. Weeks after the election Williams appointed Ottenheimer as the province's Minister of Education. In February 2004, Ottenheimer confirmed that the provincial government would maintain the post-secondary education tuition freeze. The PC Party had committed to maintaining the freeze in their 2003 election platform but following a review of the province's finances the new government began to make sweeping budgetary cuts.

=== Minister of Health and Community Services ===
On October 1, 2004, Ottenheimer was named minister of Health and Community Services, succeeding Elizabeth Marshall who quit the post after a public dispute with Williams over his management style.

In October 2005, it was reported that Eastern Health, the province's largest health authority, was reviewing breast cancer tests dating back to 1997. The health authority later announced that between 1997 and 2005 over 400 women received inaccurate test results. The incident led the provincial government to call a judicial commission of inquiry into the conduct of Eastern Health. The Cameron Inquiry began in May 2007 and finished hearing testimony in October 2008. Ottenheimer was questioned at the inquiry in March 2008, about his role in the matter. Prior to Ottenheimer's testimony, it was reported that he had found out about the error in the testings on July 19, 2005, several months before it was reported in the media. Ottenheimer stated that he had wanted to go public with the information when he found out but was advised by officials at Eastern Health not to.

In March 2005, Ottenheimer blacked out on an airplane en route to Gander and had a pacemaker installed later in the day. The incident led to Ottenheimer taking a two-month leave of absence from cabinet.

=== Minister of Intergovernmental Affairs ===
On March 16, 2006, Ottenheimer was appointed Minister of Intergovernmental Affairs. The move to the less demanding portfolio was a result of the health issues he faced the previous year. Ottenheimer said he needed a lifestyle change and had spoken to Williams the week prior to the shuffle about his health.

On June 15, 2007, Ottenheimer announced he would not be seeking re-election in that year's provincial election.

== Federal politics ==
On March 30, 2011, Ottenheimer announced that he would be the Conservative Party of Canada candidate in the district of Random—Burin—St. George's in the 2011 federal election. He was defeated by Liberal incumbent Judy Foote, receiving 8,322 votes.

== Leadership bid ==
Ottenheimer unsuccessfully ran for the leadership of the provincial Progressive Conservatives in 2014, losing to Paul Davis. He subsequently decided against running for the federal Conservative nomination in Avalon for the 2015 election. Davis subsequently appointed Ottenheimer to head the Newfoundland and Labrador Housing Corporation. He was termination without cause from the NL Housing Corp. in 2016 following the Liberals forming government. In 2018, he returned to law joining the Morrow, Morrow & Crosbie firm in Bay Roberts.

== Electoral Record ==
2014 Progressive Conservative Party of Newfoundland and Labrador leadership election
Candidate	Ballot 1	Ballot 2		Ballot 3	
Name	Votes	Votes	+/- (pp)	Votes	+/- (pp)
Paul Davis	253; 37.0%	340; 50.0%	+13.0%	351; 51.8%	+1.8%
John Ottenheimer	289; 42.3%	339; 49.9%	+7.6%	326; 48.1%	-1.7%
Steve Kent	141; 20.7%	Endorsed Davis			
Votes cast and net change by ballot
Total	683	680	-3	678	-2

2011 Canadian federal election
Party	Candidate	Votes	%	±%	Expenditures
Liberal	Judy Foote	12,914	49.65	-4.10	$31,470.79
Conservative	John Ottenheimer	8,322	32.00	+11.49	$58,392.45
New Democratic	Stella Magalios	4,465	17.17	-6.60	$9.13
Green	Tanya Gutmanis	307	1.18	-0.80	none listed
Total valid votes/expense limit		26,008	100.0	–	$94,623.02
Total rejected, unmarked and declined ballots		120	0.46	+0.06	
Turnout		26,128	45.80	+4.73	
Eligible voters		57,047			
Liberal hold		Swing		-7.80	

2003 Newfoundland and Labrador general election
Party	Candidate	Votes	%	±%
Progressive Conservative	John Ottenheimer	4,151	69.85	–
NDP	Bruce Clarke	864	14.54	
Liberal	George Murphy	862	14.50	
Independent	Steve Durant	66	1.11	

1999 Newfoundland and Labrador general election
Party	Candidate	Votes	%	±%
Progressive Conservative	John Ottenheimer	3,774	63.40	
Liberal	Tom McGrath	1,559	26.19	
NDP	Barry Darby	600	10.08	

1996 Newfoundland and Labrador general election
Party	Candidate	Votes	%	±%
Progressive Conservative	John Ottenheimer	2,989	48.61	–
Liberal	Hubert Kitchen	2,340	38.05	
NDP	Sean Murray	796	12.94	
