= Randy Simms =

Canandian politician

Randy Simms is a former politician and radio host. He was mayor of Mount Pearl, Newfoundland and Labrador from 2007 to 2017. Simms was also host of Open Line, a call-in radio talk show that airs weekday mornings on the VOCM/CFCB radio network, and a political commentator for The Telegram and CBC News.

== Municipal politics ==
Simms became mayor of Mount Pearl in 2007, when the previous mayor, Steve Kent stepped down to represent the district of Mount Pearl North in the House of Assembly. He was re-elected by acclaimation in the 2009 and 2013 elections. Simms announced in May 2017 announced that he will not seek another term in the 2017 election.

== Provincial politics ==
Simms' first foray into provincial politics was in the 1979 election when he ran as the Liberal candidate for the district of Gander. He came in second to incumbent Progressive Conservative (PC) MHA Hazel Newhook. In 1993, Simms ran again as the Progressive Conservative candidate in the district of Harbour Main succeeding the retiring Norman Doyle. He was again defeated and lost to Don Whelan.

In 2014, Simms joined the Liberal Office of the Official Opposition as an advisor. Following the Liberals forming government in the 2015 election, Simms was appointed as a researcher in the government members' office until being laid-off in 2017.

In 2015, Simms announced he would seek the Liberal Party nomination in the district of Mount Pearl North. He was subsequently acclaimed as the party's candidate for the 2015 provincial election. On November 30, 2015, Simms was defeated by Progressive Conservative incumbent Steve Kent.
