= Lucy Stoyles =

Canadian politician

Lucy Stoyles MHA

Member of the Newfoundland and Labrador House of Assembly for Mount Pearl North
- Incumbent
- Assumed office March 27, 2021
- Preceded by: Jim Lester

Personal details
- Born: Lucy S. Woodrow Bay de Verde, Newfoundland, Canada
- Party: Liberal
- Spouse: Reg Stoyles
- Occupation: Public Servant

Lucy S. Stoyles (née Woodrow) is a Canadian politician from Newfoundland and Labrador. She was elected to the Newfoundland and Labrador House of Assembly in the 2021 provincial election. She represents the electoral district of Mount Pearl North as a member of the Liberal Party of Newfoundland and Labrador.

Prior to entering provincial politics, Stoyles was a Mount Pearl city councillor for 25 years and constituency assistant to Mount Pearl-Southlands member of the House of Assembly (MHA) Paul Lane.

== Background and politics ==
Stoyles was born in Bay de Verde, the daughter of Jeremiah and Ethel Woodrow. She moved to Mount Pearl as a teenager and volunteered for many organizations, including the Canadian Cancer Society and the Salvation Army. She was also a founding member of the Save Our People Action Committee.

Stoyles was first elected to the Mount Pearl City Council in 1996. She entered provincial politics in 2021 after winning the Liberal nomination for Mount Pearl North. In a close election, Stoyles defeated incumbent Progressive Conservative (PC) MHA Jim Lester. Lester would later challenge the election results in the Supreme Court of Newfoundland and Labrador.

Stoyles was re-elected in the 2025 Newfoundland and Labrador general election.

== Election results ==
2025 Newfoundland and Labrador general election: Mount Pearl North
Party	Candidate	Votes	%	±%
Liberal	Lucy Stoyles	3,038	58.41	+11.72
Progressive Conservative	Jim Lester	1,733	33.32	-11.28
New Democratic	Donn Sears	430	8.27	+1.79
Total valid votes		5,201		
Total rejected ballots				
Turnout				
Eligible voters				
Liberal hold		Swing		+11.50

2021 Newfoundland and Labrador general election: Mount Pearl North
Party	Candidate	Votes	%	±%
Liberal	Lucy Stoyles	2,428	46.69	+9.50
Progressive Conservative	Jim Lester	2,319	44.60	-4.64
New Democratic	Jennifer McCreath	337	6.48	+0.42
NL Alliance	William Neville	116	2.23	-5.27
Total valid votes		5,200	99.46	
Total rejected ballots		28	0.54	
Turnout		5,228	49.64	
Eligible voters		10,531		
Liberal gain from Progressive Conservative		Swing		+7.07
Source(s) "Officially Nominated Candidates General Election 2021" (PDF). Elections Newfoundland and Labrador. "NL Election 2021 (Unofficial Results)".
