= George Murphy (Canadian politician) =

Canadian politician (1963–2021)

Member of the Newfoundland and Labrador House of Assembly for St. John's East
- In office October 27, 2011 – November 5, 2015
- Preceded by: Ed Buckingham
- Succeeded by: District Abolished

Personal details
- Born: George Walter Murphy; April 22, 1963 St. John's, Newfoundland and Labrador
- Died: June 5, 2021 (aged 58) Conception Bay South, Newfoundland and Labrador
- Party: New Democrat (2010–2015); Liberal (2003–2010, 2018–2021)
- Occupation: Taxi Driver

George Walter Murphy (April 22, 1963 – June 5, 2021) was a Canadian politician, who served in the Newfoundland and Labrador House of Assembly from 2011 to 2015. He represented the electoral district of St. John's East for the Newfoundland and Labrador New Democratic Party.

== Politics ==
Murphy first ran for election as a Liberal candidate in the district of St. John's East in the 2003 election, placing second with 14.56 per cent of the vote.

In November 2010 Murphy decided to leave the Liberal party and run for the NDP nomination in the Conception Bay East-Bell Island by-election. Murphy placed second and received 26.14 per cent of the vote.

In the 2011 provincial election Murphy ran as the NDP candidate in St. John's East. Murphy garnered 52.11 per cent of the vote to win the seat.

On June 22, 2015, Murphy announced he would not be reoffering in the 2015 election. Part of Murphy's district of St. John's East had been redistricted with fellow NDP MHA Lorraine Michael's seat; Michael successfully ran in the new district. Murphy returned to his previous career as a taxi driver following the 2015 election.

Murphy had been the spokesperson of the Consumer Group for Fair Gas Prices since 2006, and regularly appeared in St. John's area media as a commentator on local gas prices. Murphy distanced himself from the NDP after leaving office.

In 2018, Murphy attended the NL Liberals' annual general meeting and stated that he supported the Liberals and Premier Dwight Ball.

Murphy contested the 2019 provincial election as the Liberal candidate in St. John's East-Quidi Vidi but lost to NDP leader Alison Coffin.

In 2021, Murphy unsuccessfully ran as the Liberal candidate in Harbour Main for the 2021 provincial election.

Murphy died of a heart attack on the evening of June 5, 2021 at his Seal Cove residence.

== Electoral record ==
2021 Newfoundland and Labrador general election: Harbour Main
Party	Candidate	Votes	%	±%
Progressive Conservative	Helen Conway-Ottenheimer	3,180	54.47	-5.62
Liberal	George Murphy	2,430	41.62	+10.98
New Democratic	Tony Chadwick	228	3.91	
Total valid votes		5,838	98.80	
Total rejected ballots		71	1.20	
Turnout		5,909	53.70	
Eligible voters		11,004		
Progressive Conservative hold		Swing		-8.30
Source(s) "Officially Nominated Candidates General Election 2021" (PDF). Elections Newfoundland and Labrador. "NL Election 2021 Report" (PDF).

2019 Newfoundland and Labrador general election
Party	Candidate	Votes
New Democratic	Alison Coffin	2,699
Liberal	George Murphy	2,072
Progressive Conservative	David Porter	1,436
Source: Elections Newfoundland and Labrador

2011 Newfoundland and Labrador general election
Party	Candidate	Votes	%	±%
NDP	George Murphy	2,766	52.11%	
Progressive Conservative	Ed Buckingham	2,175	40.98%	–
Liberal	Michael Duffy	367	6.91%	

}

By-Election - December 2, 2010 On the death of Dianne Whalen, October 3, 2010
Party	Candidate	Votes	%	±%
Progressive Conservative	David Brazil	2,638	66.28%	-5.51%
NDP	George Murphy	1,043	26.20%	+15.96%
Liberal	Joy Buckle	299	7.51%	-10.46%

2003 Newfoundland and Labrador general election
Party	Candidate	Votes	%	±%
Progressive Conservative	John Ottenheimer	4,151	69.85	–
NDP	Bruce Clarke	864	14.54	
Liberal	George Murphy	862	14.50	
Independent	Steve Durant	66	1.11	
