= John W. Mahoney =

Canadian lawyer, judge and politician

MHA for Harbour Main
- In office 1966–1971
- Preceded by: Clifton J. Joy
- Succeeded by: Gordon Dawe

Minister of Justice and Attorney General
- In office July 30, 1971 – November 8, 1971
- Preceded by: Leslie Curtis
- Succeeded by: Frank Moores

Personal details
- Born: December 28, 1926
- Died: September 30, 2006 (aged 79)

John William Mahoney (December 28, 1926 – September 30, 2006) was a lawyer, judge and politician in

Newfoundland, Canada. He represented Harbour Main in the Newfoundland House of Assembly from 1966 to 1971.

The son of Thomas Mahoney and Anne Victoria O'Toole, he was born in St. John's and was educated in Conception Harbour, at Saint Bonaventure's College and at Memorial University College. He was called to the Newfoundland bar in 1951, practised privately and then served as prosecutor for the Department of Justice from 1953 to 1966. In 1964, he was named Queen's Counsel.

Mahoney married Carmel J. Galway; the couple had six children.

He was elected to the Newfoundland assembly in 1966 and served in the provincial cabinet as Minister of Justice. He was defeated when he ran for reelection in 1971. He returned to the practice of law and then, in 1975, was named to the trial division of the Supreme Court of Newfoundland. In 1982, he was named to the Appeals division of the Supreme Court.

He died in St. John's at the age of 79.

Mahoney was an uncle of former Newfoundland premier Danny Williams.
