= Jim Lester (Canadian politician) =

Canadian politician

Jim Lester MHA

Member of the Newfoundland and Labrador House of Assembly for Mount Pearl North
- In office November 21, 2017 – March 27, 2021
- Preceded by: Steve Kent
- Succeeded by: Lucy Stoyles

Personal details
- Born: St. John's, Newfoundland and Labrador
- Party: Progressive Conservative

Jim Lester is a Canadian politician who served as the Newfoundland and Labrador Member of the House of Assembly for Mount Pearl North from 2017 to 2021.

Lester ran in the 2015 provincial election in Mount Pearl-Southlands, but lost to Liberal candidate Paul Lane. Following the resignation of Steve Kent in 2017, Lester won the PC nomination in Mount Pearl North and subsequently defeated Liberal Jim Burton.

In 2018, Lester endorsed Ches Crosbie in the 2018 provincial PC leadership race.

Lester was re-elected in the 2019 provincial election. In the 2021 provincial election, he was defeated by Liberal candidate Lucy Stoyles.

Lester's family owns and operates the agritourism venture Lester's Farm Inc.

== Electoral record ==
2025 Newfoundland and Labrador general election: Mount Pearl North
Party	Candidate	Votes	%	±%
Liberal	Lucy Stoyles	3,038	58.41	+11.72
Progressive Conservative	Jim Lester	1,733	33.32	-11.28
New Democratic	Donn Sears	430	8.27	+1.79
Total valid votes		5,201		
Total rejected ballots				
Turnout				
Eligible voters				
Liberal hold		Swing		+11.50

2021 Newfoundland and Labrador general election: Mount Pearl North
Party	Candidate	Votes	%	±%
Liberal	Lucy Stoyles	2,428	46.69	+9.50
Progressive Conservative	Jim Lester	2,319	44.60	-4.64
New Democratic	Jennifer McCreath	337	6.48	+0.42
NL Alliance	William Neville	116	2.23	-5.27
Total valid votes		5,200	99.46	
Total rejected ballots		28	0.54	
Turnout		5,228	49.64	
Eligible voters		10,531		
Liberal gain from Progressive Conservative		Swing		+7.07
Source(s) "Officially Nominated Candidates General Election 2021" (PDF). Elections Newfoundland and Labrador. "NL Election 2021 (Unofficial Results)".

2019 Newfoundland and Labrador general election
Party	Candidate	Votes	%	±%
Progressive Conservative	Jim Lester	2,907	49.2	
Liberal	Nicole Kieley	2,196	37.2	
NL Alliance	William Neville	443	7.5	
New Democratic	Carol Reade	358	6.1	
Total valid votes				
Total rejected ballots				
Turnout				
Eligible voters				

}

Mount Pearl North By-Election - November 21, 2017 On the resignation of Steve Kent, October 11, 2017
Party	Candidate	Votes	%	±%
Progressive Conservative	Jim Lester	2,064	46.89	-4.59
Liberal	Jim Burton	1,129	25.65	-16.77
New Democratic	Nicole Kieley	1,088	24.72	+18.61
Independent	Hudson Stratton	121	2.75	
Progressive Conservative hold		Swing		+6.09
Total valid votes		4,402	99.62	
Total rejected and declined votes		17	0.38	
Turnout		4,419	44.30	
Electors on the lists		9,976		

2015 Newfoundland and Labrador general election
Party	Candidate	Votes	%	±%
Liberal	Paul Lane	2,559	47.4	–
Progressive Conservative	Jim Lester	2,318	42.9	–
New Democratic	Roy Locke	522	9.7	–
