= Colliers, Newfoundland and Labrador =

Colliers
- Town
- Location of Colliers in Newfoundland
- Coordinates: 47°27′N 53°14′W
- Country: Canada
- Province: Newfoundland and Labrador
- Census division: 1

Government
  - Mayor: Andy Parsley
  - MHA: Helen Conway-Ottenheimer (PC) Harbour Main
  - MP: Paul Connors (Liberal) Avalon

Area
  - Land: 26.23 km^{2} (10.13 sq mi)

Population (2021)
  - Total: 613
  - Density: 24.9/km^{2} (64/sq mi)
- Time zone: UTC-3:30 (Newfoundland Time)
  - Summer (DST): UTC-2:30 (Newfoundland Daylight)
- Area code: 709
- Highways: Route 60

Colliers is a town on the Avalon Peninsula in Newfoundland and Labrador, Canada. It is in Division 1 on Conception Bay.

According to the 2016 Statistics Canada Census: the area had a population of 654, with 424 dwellings.

Colliers was considered by John Guy and his associates as a preferred place for the first settlement in North America. The area that became known as Cupers Cove (Cupids) was chosen to great tragedy. If Colliers had been chosen, this tragedy might not have occurred. Thus Colliers would have been the first permanent settlement in North America.

Famous residents of Colliers include former Lt. Gov. James A. McGrath, actor John Ryan and musician Terry McDonald.

== Demographics ==
In the 2021 Census of Population conducted by Statistics Canada, Colliers had a population of 613 living in 269 of its 414 total private dwellings, a change of −6.3% from its 2016 population of 654. With a land area of 26.24 km^{2} (10.13 sq mi), it had a population density of 23.4/km^{2} (60.5/sq mi) in 2021.

== See also ==
- List of cities and towns in Newfoundland and Labrador
