= Ken McDonald (politician) =

Canadian politician (born 1959)

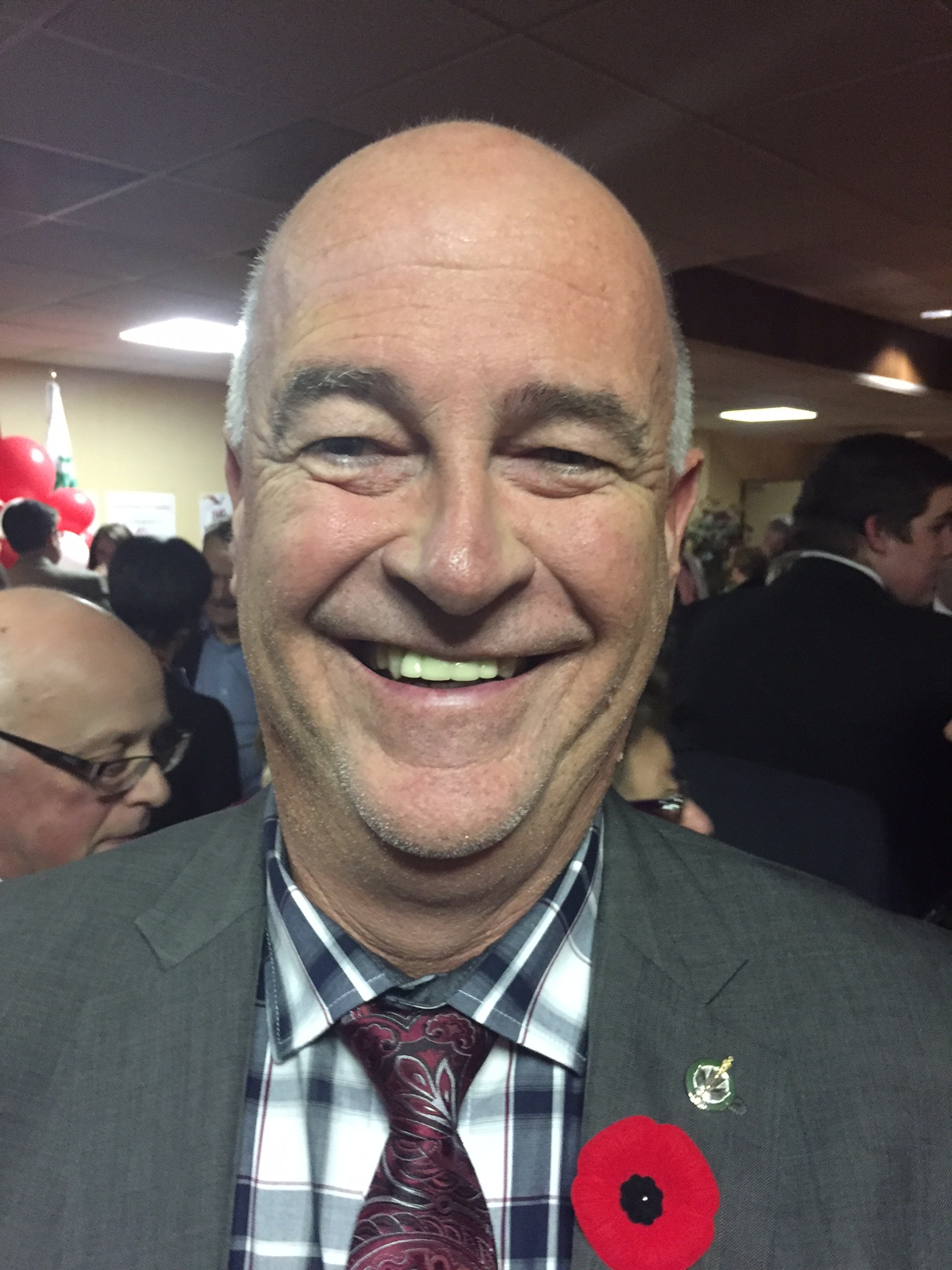
- McDonald in November 2016

Member of Parliament for Avalon
- In office October 19, 2015 – March 23, 2025
- Preceded by: Scott Andrews
- Succeeded by: Paul Connors

Mayor of Conception Bay South
- In office September 24, 2013 – March 2015
- Preceded by: Woodrow French
- Succeeded by: Stephen Tessier

Personal details
- Born: Kenneth Joseph McDonald; June 1959 (age 66) Conception Bay South, Newfoundland and Labrador, Canada
- Party: Liberal (2015–present)
- Other political affiliations: Independent (until 2015)
- Children: 1
- Occupation: Politician; repairman
- Website: Official website

Kenneth Joseph McDonald (born June 1959) is a Canadian politician who was the member of Parliament (MP) for the riding of Avalon from 2015 to 2025, and the former mayor of Conception Bay South, the second largest municipality in the Canadian province of Newfoundland and Labrador.

== Municipal politics ==
McDonald was Conception Bay South's councillor for Ward 3 from 1993 to 1996 and from 2009 to 2013. McDonald unsuccessfully ran for mayor in 2005 against Woodrow French, coming second out of four candidates. On September 24, 2013, McDonald defeated French 3273 votes to 1703 during that year's municipal elections.

In April 2015, McDonald threatened to block Nalcor Energy's heavy trucks from using roads in Conception Bay South during the construction at Muskrat Falls for the Lower Churchill Project. After negotiations, the trucks were allowed as long as drivers drove below the speed limit and Nalcor repaired any damage.

In 2014, McDonald closed a deal for a new town hall, which along with a stadium and fire house, account for $40 million of facilities scheduled to be completed in Fall 2015, of which C.B.S. would be responsible for $13.2 million. As a councillor in 2010, McDonald opposed a $20 million plan to build a larger town hall because he prioritized other issues such as access to water and sewage services.

== Federal politics ==
McDonald was the Liberal candidate for the riding of Avalon in the 2015 Canadian federal election, replacing Scott Andrews, who was ejected from caucus in March 2015 after allegations of sexual misconduct. McDonald was elected with over 55% of the vote, defeating Andrews, who finished second.

He was re-elected in the 2019 and 2021 federal elections.

In October 2022, McDonald supported a Conservative motion asking the federal government to agree to the request of Andrew Furey, the Liberal Premier of Newfoundland and Labrador, for an exemption on the carbon pricing for home heating fuels. In October 2023, he again supported a failed non-binding motion from the Conservatives against carbon pricing. He was the only member from the Liberal, Bloc, or NDP caucuses to vote in favour of the motion. McDonald cited the effect the policy had on rural and vulnerable people. However, in November 2023, he voted alongside the Liberals and Bloc against a failed non-binding Conservative motion to expand the temporary pause on carbon tax for all home heating fuels across the country and was accused of giving the middle finger to the Conservatives while voting.

In January 2024, McDonald called for a leadership review for Prime Minister Justin Trudeau, a statement he retracted the following day. In July 2024, McDonald announced on VOCM Radio that he would not seek re-election. In the 2025 Liberal Party of Canada leadership election, he endorsed Chrystia Freeland.

== Provincial politics ==
On June 6, 2025, McDonald announced that he would seek the Liberal nomination in Conception Bay South. On June 7, 2025, McDonald was acclaimed the candidate in the district. He was defeated by PC incumbent Barry Petten.

== Personal life ==
McDonald has lived in Conception Bay South his entire life. Outside politics McDonald runs a home appliance repair business. He has a son, born in 1986.

== Electoral history ==
2025 Newfoundland and Labrador general election: Conception Bay South
Party	Candidate	Votes	%	±%
Progressive Conservative	Barry Petten	3,060	56.5%	
Liberal	Ken McDonald	2,043	37.7%	
New Democratic	Rhonda Watkins	309	5.7%	
Total valid votes				
Total rejected ballots				
Turnout				
Eligible voters				
Progressive Conservative hold		Swing		

2021 Canadian federal election: Avalon
Party	Candidate	Votes	%	±%	Expenditures
Liberal	Ken McDonald	18,608	50.10	+3.83	$46,697.12
Conservative	Matthew Chapman	12,738	34.29	+3.19	$56,179.94
New Democratic	Carolyn Davis	5,151	13.87	−3.41	$0.00
People's	Lainie Stewart	647	1.74	–	$0.00
Total valid votes/expense limit		37,144	99.27		$110,063.67
Total rejected ballots		273	0.73	–0.22	
Turnout		37,417	52.77	–6.55	
Registered voters		70,903			
Liberal hold		Swing		+0.32	
Source: Elections Canada

2019 Canadian federal election: Avalon
Party	Candidate	Votes	%	±%	Expenditures
Liberal	Ken McDonald	19,122	46.26	−9.64	$63,518.25
Conservative	Matthew Chapman	12,855	31.10	+20.00	$37,082.47
New Democratic	Lea Mary Movelle	7,142	17.28	+2.85	none listed
Green	Greg Malone	2,215	5.36	+4.82	none listed
Total valid votes/expense limit		41,334	99.05	-0.57	$104,436.05
Total rejected ballots		397	0.95	+0.57	
Turnout		41,731	59.33	−2.36	
Eligible voters		70,341			
Liberal hold		Swing		−14.82	
Source: Elections Canada

2015 Canadian federal election: Avalon
Party	Candidate	Votes	%	±%	Expenditures
Liberal	Ken McDonald	23,528	55.90	+22.73	$70,924.68
Independent	Scott Andrews	7,501	17.82	–26.15	$63,334.50
New Democratic	Jeannie Baldwin	6,075	14.43	–14.10	$70,840.75
Conservative	Lorraine E. Barnett	4,670	11.10	–26.00	$58,123.54
Green	Krista Byrne-Puumala	228	0.54	–0.09	$76.49
Strength in Democracy	Jennifer McCreath	84	0.20	–	–
Total valid votes/expense limit		42,086	100.00		$208,407.32
Total rejected ballots		162	0.38		
Turnout		42,248	62.33		
Eligible voters		67,781			
Liberal notional gain from Independent		Swing		+24.36	
Source: Elections Canada

2013 Conception Bay South mayoral election
Candidate	Vote	%
Ken McDonald	3,273	63.50
Woodrow French (X)	1,703	33.04
Gord Taylor	178	3.45

2009 Ward 3, Conception Bay South council election
Candidate	Vote	%
Ken McDonald	528	50.97
Gerard Tilley (X)	508	49.03

2005 Conception Bay South mayoral election
Candidate	Vote	%
Woodrow French	2,244	38.5
Ken McDonald	1,392	23.9
Marie Deacy	1,067	18.3
Sandra Baggs	1,060	18.2
Michael Jennings	63	1.1
