= Betty Parsley =

Canadian politician

Betty Parsley MHA

Member of the Newfoundland and Labrador House of Assembly for Harbour Main
- In office November 30, 2015 – April 17, 2019
- Preceded by: Tom Hedderson
- Succeeded by: Helen Conway-Ottenheimer

Personal details
- Party: Liberal

Betty Parsley is a Canadian politician, who was elected to the Newfoundland and Labrador House of Assembly in the 2015 provincial election. She represented the electoral district of Harbour Main as a member of the Liberal Party from 2015 to 2019.

Prior to her election to the legislature, Parsley served as mayor of Harbour Main-Chapel's Cove-Lakeview. She lives in Holyrood.

== Background ==
Parsley was born and raised in Harbour Main and received formal training in travel and tourism. She had a career as a travel consultant before going into politics. Her first involvement in municipal politics was in 2007 when she was elected as a town councillor.
