= Julie Bettney =

Canadian politician

The Honourable Julie Bettney ECNL

Minister of Health and Community Services
- In office January 5, 2001 – April 16, 2001
- Preceded by: Roger Grimes
- Succeeded by: Gerald Smith

MHA for Mount Pearl South
- In office 1996–2003
- Preceded by: Neil Windsor
- Succeeded by: Dave Denine

Personal details
- Born: September 7, 1951 (age 75) Port au Port, Newfoundland and Labrador
- Party: Liberal

Julie Bettney (born September 7, 1951) is a Canadian educator and former politician. She represented the district of Mount Pearl South in the Newfoundland and Labrador House of Assembly from 1996 to 2003 as a member of the Liberal Party.

She was born in Port au Port and was educated in Stephenville, in Grand Falls and at Memorial University, where she received a Bachelor of Physical Education. Bettney worked in Labrador as a physical education teacher from 1970 to 1971 and then as a special education teacher from 1973 to 1974. In 1979, she moved to Mount Pearl. From 1980 to 1984, she was a program director for recreation integration for people with disabilities. From 1985 to 1996, Bettney was a training development officer with the Newfoundland Public Service Commission. She was elected to Mount Pearl city council in 1985 and served as mayor of Mount Pearl from 1993 to 1996.

Bettney was elected to the Newfoundland assembly in 1996, defeating incumbent Neil Windsor, and was re-elected in 1999. She served in the provincial cabinet as Minister of Works, Services and Transportation, as Minister of Health and Community Services and as Minister of Tourism, Culture and Recreation. She retired from politics in 2003.

In 2006, she founded a dragon boat team, the Avalon Dragons, for breast cancer survivors.

Bettney Place in Mount Pearl was named in her honour.
