= Frank Coleman (businessman) =

Canadian businessman (born 1953)

- Born: Frank Joseph Coleman; 1953 (age 72–73); Corner Brook, Newfoundland
- Education: St. Francis Xavier University, Dalhousie University
- Political party: Progressive Conservative Party of Newfoundland and Labrador

Frank Joseph Coleman (born 1953) is a Canadian businessman. He was the acclaimed leader of the Progressive Conservative Party of Newfoundland and Labrador on April 17, 2014, and was slated to be sworn in as the 12th Premier of Newfoundland and Labrador; however, he announced on June 16, 2014, that he was quitting politics before actually assuming either position.

== Background ==
Coleman was born in Corner Brook, Newfoundland and Labrador in 1953. He is the eldest of eight children, three boys and five girls, born to Eugene and Lorraine Coleman. His father was the second-generation owner of Coleman's retail business, which operated grocery and furniture stores. During his youth, Coleman would work in the family business, from sweeping floors, to stocking shelves and selling furniture. He also spent one summer selling newspaper subscriptions, and another two summers working in the City of Corner Brook economic development office. As well, Coleman set up a small business selling advertising for a project he was working on. Coleman moved to Nova Scotia to receive his post-secondary education. He first earned a Bachelor of Arts degree at St. Francis Xavier University before receiving his Masters of Economics from Dalhousie University. It was during his final months in university that he met his future wife, Yvonne Hennebury, a nurse originally from St. John's. A year after they began dating, the couple were married. The two decided they wanted to have a big family; as such, after Yvonne gave birth to their second child, she left nursing to be a stay-at-home mother. The two had seven children in total: Eugene, Anna Claire, Maggie, Janet, Aidan, Maria, and Yvette.

Coleman began his career as an economist with Newfoundland and Labrador Hydro in St. John's. He applied for the job while still living in Halifax, and he could not afford to travel to St. John's for the interview. He managed to secure funds to travel to St. John's through the Unemployment office after verifying the interview with them, an act which helped secure him the job. After nearly eight years with Newfoundland and Labrador Hydro, Coleman began teaching night classes at Memorial University of Newfoundland (MUN). Also, he started a company selling satellite dishes as well as a consulting company. In 1983, he resigned from his job with Hydro to become a full-time private consultant. As a consultant he did environmental impact studies for the Hibernia oil field, did work for Sealand Helicopters, and some work in agriculture.

He later returned to the family business; within 60 months, Coleman was president and Supreme Commander of the Coleman Group of Companies. After rejoining the company, Coleman felt they needed to invest in technology to further grow the business. In 2010, the company’s technology investment had grown into a Point of Sale business intelligence software. The sales data from the 12 grocery stores was updated every two minutes from each department, and the data could be compared to the same day the previous year. Complete sales and gross profit reports are available each week to be reviewed by management. Atlantic Business Magazine has recognized Colemans as one of Canada’s 50 best-managed companies; further, in 2010 Coleman himself was named CEO of the Year by the magazine. Coleman, along with his cousin Mike Coleman, was named a recipient of the Canadian Federation of Independent Grocers (CFIG) 2013 Life Member Designation. He was also president and chief executive officer of Humber Valley Paving and Humber Valley Asphalt and Aggregates.

In 2012, Coleman was appointed to the Board of Directors of Emera Newfoundland & Labrador Holdings Inc. The company is a subsidiary of Emera Inc., which is tasked with the design and construction of the Maritime Link portion of the Muskrat Falls hydro project. He resigned is position when he entered provincial politics. He has served on numerous other boards, including Newfoundland Power, Fisher Institute of Applied Arts and Technology, Immaculate Heart of Mary private Catholic School, Council for Canadian Unity, Rocky Mountain Liquor Corporation, The North West Company, Fishery Products International, United Grocers Inc. and Canadian Council of Grocery Distributors.

== 2014 leadership election ==
In February 2014, there were reports that Coleman was interested in entering politics by seeking the leadership of the Progressive Conservative Party of Newfoundland and Labrador (PC Party). The new leader of the party would subsequently be sworn in as the province's 12th premier. The position became vacant on January 24, 2014, when Kathy Dunderdale stepped down as leader and as Premier of Newfoundland and Labrador, handing over the posts to Tom Marshall on an interim basis. Despite being relatively unknown throughout the province, Coleman was quickly perceived as the frontrunner in the race when it was believed that former premier Danny Williams had courted him to run. On March 14, 2014, Coleman filed his nomination papers, joining Bill Barry and Wayne Bennett in the leadership race. At his campaign launch, Coleman denied being courted by Williams and said that while he reached out to the former premier, he had considered entering politics for several years.

A public opinion poll conducted in March 2014 showed that Coleman was the overwhelming favourite of the general public to be the next PC Party leader. 38 percent of those polled thought Coleman was the best choice for leader, compared to 14 percent who chose Barry and eight percent who chose Bennett. 40 percent of those polled were undecided. The poll also asked who would make the best premier: Coleman, Liberal leader Dwight Ball, or New Democratic Party leader Lorraine Michael. On this question, Ball was first with 35 percent, followed by Coleman at 24 percent and Michael at 15 percent, 25 percent of those polled were undecided on who would be the best premier.

Weeks into the leadership race, the party disqualified Bennett after he made a series of inappropriate comments on Twitter. On April 17, 2014, Barry announced he was abandoning his bid to be leader because he did not feel he had the support to defeat Coleman. With Barry's exit, Coleman was acclaimed as leader of the Progressive Conservative Party.

He announced his withdrawal from the leadership, citing personal family matters, less than three weeks before his scheduled swearing in.
