= Tom Hedderson =

Canadian politician (1954–2022)

The Honourable Tom Hedderson ECNL

Member of the Newfoundland and Labrador House of Assembly for Harbour Main
- In office February 9, 1999 – November 27, 2015
- Preceded by: Don Whelan
- Succeeded by: Betty Parsley

Minister of Environment and Conservation, Minister Responsible for the Multi-Materials Stewardship Board, And Minister Responsible for the office of climate change, Energy Efficiency and Emissions training of Newfoundland and Labrador
- In office October 19, 2012 – October 9, 2013
- Preceded by: Terry French
- Succeeded by: Joan Shea

Minister of Transportation and Works, Acting Minister of Municipal Affairs, Registrar General, Minister Responsible for Emergency Preparedness, And Minister Responsible for the NL Housing Corporation of Newfoundland and Labrador
- In office November 7, 2009 – October 19, 2012
- Preceded by: Trevor Taylor
- Succeeded by: Paul Davis

Minister of Fisheries and Aquaculture of Newfoundland and Labrador
- In office October 31, 2008 – November 27, 2009,
- Preceded by: Tom Rideout
- Succeeded by: Clyde Jackman

Minister of Intergovernmental Affairs And Minister Responsible for the Voluntary and non-profit sector of Newfoundland and Labrador
- In office October 30, 2007 – October 31, 2008
- Succeeded by: Dave Denine

Minister of Tourism, Culture and Recreation of Newfoundland and Labrador
- In office November 8, 2005 – October 30, 2007
- Succeeded by: Clyde Jackman

Minister of Education of Newfoundland and Labrador
- In office October 1, 2004 – November 8, 2005
- Preceded by: John Ottenheimer
- Succeeded by: Joan Burke

Personal details
- Born: May 7, 1954
- Died: August 8, 2022 (aged 68) Georgetown, Newfoundland and Labrador, Canada
- Party: Progressive Conservative

Thomas J. Hedderson (May 7, 1954 – August 8, 2022) was a Canadian politician in Newfoundland and Labrador. He was a cabinet minister and served as the Parliamentary Assistant to the Premier of Newfoundland and Labrador, Kathy Dunderdale.

Hedderson represented the district of Harbour Main from 1999 until 2015, being re-elected three times. He previously held the portfolios of Minister of Education, Minister of Tourism, Culture and Recreation, Minister of Intergovernmental Affairs, Transportation and Works, and Minister of Fisheries and Aquaculture. Before entering politics Hedderson worked as a principal.

Hedderson died on August 8, 2022, at the age of 68.

== Electoral record ==
1999 Newfoundland and Labrador general election
Party	Candidate	Votes	%	±%
Progressive Conservative	Tom Hedderson	3670	54.91%	–
Liberal	Wanda Dawe	2502	37.43%	
NDP	Fred Akerman	511	7.64%	

2003 Newfoundland and Labrador general election
Party	Candidate	Votes	%	±%
Progressive Conservative	Tom Hedderson	4769	70.71%	–
Liberal	Fred Akerman	1482	21.98%	
NDP	Eugene Conway	493	7.31%	

2007 Newfoundland and Labrador general election
Party	Candidate	Votes	%	±%
Progressive Conservative	Tom Hedderson	4606	82.78%	–
Liberal	Kevin Slaney	635	11.41%	
NDP	Jean Dandenault	323	5.81%	

2011 Newfoundland and Labrador general election
Party	Candidate	Votes	%	±%
Progressive Conservative	Tom Hedderson	3600	69.67%	–
NDP	Mike Maher	987	19.10%	
Liberal	Bern Hickey	580	11.23%	
