= Scott Andrews (politician) =

Canadian politician

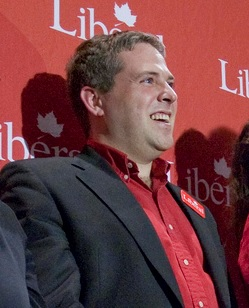

Member of Parliament for Avalon
- In office November 18, 2008 – August 4, 2015
- Preceded by: Fabian Manning
- Succeeded by: Ken McDonald

Personal details
- Born: December 28, 1974 (age 51) St. John's, Newfoundland
- Party: Independent
- Other political affiliations: Liberal (2008–2014)
- Website: Scott Andrews

Scott Andrews (born December 28, 1974) is a Canadian politician. He represented the Newfoundland and Labrador electoral district of Avalon from his election in the 2008 Canadian federal election until his defeat in the 2015 federal election. Originally a member of the Liberal Party, he most recently sat as an independent.

Prior to being elected MP, he served on the Conception Bay South Town Council.

== Life and career ==
Andrews was born in St. John's, Newfoundland. He served as a Member of the Standing Committee on Fisheries and Oceans and a Member of the Standing Committee on Veterans Affairs.

Inspired by the documentary Dear Zachary, Andrews introduced Bill C-464 on October 23, 2009, and received unanimous support from all political parties in the House of Commons to advance the bill to the Standing Committee on Justice & Human Rights on December 4, 2009. Andrews was moved to bring this bill forward in memory of Zachary Turner, a child whose mother killed him. The bill seeks to change the Criminal Code of Canada to allow the courts to justify refusing bail to those accused of serious crimes in the name of protecting their children. In December 2010, Zachary's Bill became law when Governor General David Johnston gave it Royal Assent. This marked the first time a Member of Parliament from Newfoundland and Labrador successfully passed a Private Member's Bill.

Andrews was re-elected in the 2011 general election, defeating Conservative Senator and former MP Fabian Manning a second time.

On November 5, 2014, Andrews and Massimo Pacetti were both suspended from the Liberal Party caucus by leader Justin Trudeau, following allegations of personal misconduct laid by two unnamed New Democratic Party MPs (in 2018 it was revealed that one of the MPs was Christine Moore). Both Andrews and Pacetti opted to sit as independent MPs pending investigation of the complaints. On March 14, 2015, it was reported that Trudeau had deemed Andrews' and Pacetti's reported actions serious enough that he had decided to expel them from the Liberal caucus permanently and forbid them from running as Liberals in the next election. On March 19, Andrews announced that he had accepted the findings of the investigation and would serve out his term as an independent. Andrews ran for re-election in the 2015 federal election as an independent candidate, but he was defeated by Liberal nominee Ken McDonald. Andrews placed second with 17.8% of the vote, besting both the New Democratic and Conservative candidates.

== Electoral career ==
2015 Canadian federal election: Avalon
Party	Candidate	Votes	%	±%	Expenditures
Liberal	Ken McDonald	23,528	55.90	+22.73	$70,924.68
Independent	Scott Andrews	7,501	17.82	–26.15	$63,334.50
New Democratic	Jeannie Baldwin	6,075	14.43	–14.10	$70,840.75
Conservative	Lorraine E. Barnett	4,670	11.10	–26.00	$58,123.54
Green	Krista Byrne-Puumala	228	0.54	–0.09	$76.49
Strength in Democracy	Jennifer McCreath	84	0.20	–	–
Total valid votes/expense limit		42,086	100.00		$208,407.32
Total rejected ballots		162	0.38		
Turnout		42,248	62.33		
Eligible voters		67,781			
Liberal notional gain from Independent		Swing		+24.36	
Source: Elections Canada

2011 Canadian federal election: Avalon
Party	Candidate	Votes	%	±%	Expenditures
Liberal	Scott Andrews	16,008	43.97	-1.31	$71,517.62
Conservative	Fabian Manning	14,749	40.51	+5.35	$85,098.25
New Democratic	Matthew Martin Fuchs	5,157	14.16	-3.22	$3,735.98
Independent	Randy Wayne Dawe	276	0.76	–	$1,060.00
Green	Matt Crowder	218	0.60	-1.57	$11.96
Total valid votes/expense limit		36,408	100.0	–	$85,411.40
Total rejected, declined and unmarked ballots		166	0.45	-0.34	
Turnout		36,574	56.77	+4.97	
Eligible voters		64,424			
Liberal hold		Swing		-3.33	

2008 Canadian federal election: Avalon
Party	Candidate	Votes	%	±%	Expenditures
Liberal	Scott Andrews	14,866	45.28	+6.70	$68,253
Conservative	Fabian Manning	11,542	35.16	-16.39	$54,159
New Democratic	Randy Wayne Dawe	5,707	17.38	+8.31	$25,080
Green	Dave Aylward	714	2.17	+1.37	$766
Total valid votes/expense limit		32,829	100.0	–	$82,453
Total rejected, declined and unmarked ballots		262	0.79	-0.86	
Turnout		33,091	51.80	-7.81	
Eligible voters		63,882			
Liberal gain from Conservative		Swing		+11.54	
