= Mary Hodder =

Canadian politician (1945–2025)

MHA for Burin-Placentia West
- In office 1996–2003
- Preceded by: Glenn Tobin
- Succeeded by: Clyde Jackman

Personal details
- Born: April 5, 1945 Marystown, Dominion of Newfoundland
- Died: January 26, 2025 (aged 79)
- Party: Liberal

Mary J. Hodder (April 5, 1945 – January 26, 2025) was a Canadian politician. She represented the riding of Burin-Placentia West in the Newfoundland and Labrador House of Assembly from 1996 to 2003 as a member of the Liberal Party.

The daughter of Joseph Pittman and Elizabeth Drake, she worked for the Avalon Telephone Company from 1964 to 1967. In 1966, she married Samuel H. Hodder. She served as deputy mayor for Marystown.

She was elected to the Newfoundland assembly in 1996 and re-elected in 1999. Hodder did not run for re-election in 2003.

Hodder died on January 26, 2025, at the age of 79.
