= Don Whelan =

Canadian mariner and politician

Captain Don Whelan (born 1948) is a Canadian mariner and former politician in Newfoundland. He represented Harbour Main in the Newfoundland and Labrador House of Assembly from 1993 to 1999.

The son of Captain Matthew Whelan and Bride Cole, he earned his captain's license in 1989. Whelan served as mayor of Colliers. He was executive assistant for Don Jamieson and research assistant for Len Stirling and William Rowe.

Whelan was elected to the Newfoundland assembly in 1993 and was reelected to the newly created riding of Harbour Main-Whitbourne in 1996. He did not run for reelection in 1999.
