= Harvey Hodder =

Canadian politician (1943–2020)

Speaker of the Newfoundland and Labrador House of Assembly
- In office 2003–2007
- Preceded by: Lloyd Snow
- Succeeded by: Roger Fitzgerald

Member of the House of Assembly for Waterford
- In office 1993–2007
- Preceded by: Eric Gullage
- Succeeded by: Steve Kent

Personal details
- Born: 3 March 1943
- Died: 17 September 2020 (aged 77) Creston South, Newfoundland and Labrador, Canada
- Party: Progressive Conservative
- Education: Memorial University

Harvey Hodder (3 March 1943 – 17 September 2020) was a Canadian politician in Newfoundland and Labrador. Hodder was the Progressive Conservative Member of the House of Assembly (MHA) for the riding of Waterford from 1993 to 2007.

Hodder was educated at Memorial University of Newfoundland. He served on the municipal council for Mount Pearl and was elected mayor four times. Hodder served twelve years on the St. John's Metropolitan Area Board. From 2003 to 2007, he was the Speaker of the Newfoundland and Labrador House of Assembly. He died in Creston South.

Preceded by Lloyd Snow	Speaker of the Newfoundland and Labrador House of Assembly; 2003–2007	Succeeded by Roger Fitzgerald

Preceded by Eric Gullage, Waterford-Kenmount	Newfoundland and Labrador MHA for Waterford Valley; 1993–2007	Succeeded by Steve Kent, Mount Pearl North
