= Mount Pearl-Southlands =

Provincial electoral district in Newfoundland and Labrador, Canada

Newfoundland and Labrador electoral district
- Location in the St. John's area

Provincial electoral district
- Legislature: Newfoundland and Labrador House of Assembly
MHA
Paul Lane
Independent
- District created: 2015
- First contested: 2015
- Last contested: 2025

Demographics
- Population (2016): 14,386
- Electors (2015): 9,558
- Area (km²): 25
- Census division: Division No. 1
- Census subdivision(s): Mount Pearl, St. John's

Mount Pearl-Southlands is a provincial electoral district in Newfoundland and Labrador, Canada. In the 2016 census, there were 14,386 people living in the district.

Mount Pearl-Southlands includes part of the city of Mount Pearl and the Southlands portion of the city of St. John's. The district was created following the 2015 electoral districts boundaries review. The majority of Mount Pearl-Southlands was previously the district of Mount Pearl South. The district also includes parts of the former district of Kilbride and a small part of Mount Pearl North.

== Members of the House of Assembly ==
The district has elected the following members of the House of Assembly:

Assembly	Years	Member	Party
48th	2015–2016	Paul Lane	Liberal
48th	2016–2019	Paul Lane	Independent
49th	2019–2021	Paul Lane	Independent
50th	2021–2025	Paul Lane	Independent
51st	2025–Present	Paul Lane	Independent

== Election results ==
Graph of election results (minor parties that never got 2% of the vote or did not run consistently are omitted) View source data.

2025 Newfoundland and Labrador general election
Party	Candidate	Votes	%	±%
Independent	Paul Lane	3,361	56.72	-2.89
Liberal	Sarah Furlong	1,682	28.38	+4.40
Progressive Conservative	Bryan Robbins	666	11.24	-2.55
New Democratic	Brenda Walsh	217	3.66	+1.03
Total valid votes		5,926		
Total rejected ballots				
Turnout				
Eligible voters				
Independent hold		Swing		-3.65

2021 Newfoundland and Labrador general election
Party	Candidate	Votes	%	±%
Independent	Paul Lane	3,445	59.60	+15.85
Liberal	Karla Hayward	1,386	23.98	-4.32
Progressive Conservative	Cindy Grant	797	13.79	-10.85
New Democratic	Cara Krista Winsor	152	2.63	-0.69
Total valid votes		5,780	99.42	
Total rejected ballots		34	0.58	
Turnout		5,814	54.61	
Eligible voters		10,647		
Independent hold		Swing		+10.09
Source(s) "Officially Nominated Candidates General Election 2021" (PDF). Elections Newfoundland and Labrador. "NL Election 2021 (Unofficial Results)".

2019 Newfoundland and Labrador general election
Party	Candidate	Votes	%	±%
Independent	Paul Lane	2,823	43.75	
Liberal	Hasan Hai	1,826	28.30	-19.10
Progressive Conservative	Gillian Pearson	1,590	24.64	-18.29
New Democratic	David Brake	214	3.32	-6.35
Total valid votes		6,435	99.51	
Total rejected ballots		32	0.49	+0.11
Turnout		6,485	63.24	+6.53
Eligible voters		10,255		
Independent gain from Liberal		Swing		+31.42

2015 Newfoundland and Labrador general election
Party	Candidate	Votes	%
Liberal	Paul Lane	2,559	47.40
Progressive Conservative	Jim Lester	2,318	42.93
New Democratic	Roy Locke	522	9.67
Total valid votes		5,399	99.61
Total rejected ballots		21	0.39
Turnout		5,420	56.71
Eligible voters		9,558	
Source: Elections Newfoundland and Labrador

== See also ==
- List of Newfoundland and Labrador provincial electoral districts
- Canadian provincial electoral districts
