= Mount Pearl South =

Former provincial electoral district in Newfoundland and Labrador, Canada

Newfoundland and Labrador electoral district
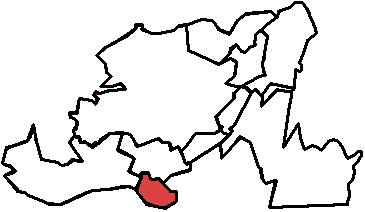
- Mount Pearl South in relation to other districts in St. John's
- Coordinates: 47.501°N 52.807°W

Defunct provincial electoral district
- Legislature: Newfoundland and Labrador House of Assembly
- District created: 1975
- District abolished: 2015
- First contested: 1975
- Last contested: 2011

Demographics
- Population (2006): 11,960
- Electors (2011): 8,114

Mount Pearl South is a defunct provincial electoral district for the House of Assembly of Newfoundland and Labrador, Canada. Prior to the 2007 provincial election, the district was known as Mount Pearl. Mount Pearl South has seen an expansion in big-box retail outlets in recent years. In 2011, there were 8,114 eligible voters living within the district.

The district was created in 1975 and was a Tory stronghold for two decades, with Progressive Conservative Neil Windsor holding the seat from 1975 to 1995. The seat went Liberal in 1996 when Brian Tobin won a large majority government, but returned to the Progressive Conservatives, under Dave Denine, in 2003 when the party swept back to power. Denine won again in the 2007 election.

Dave Denine retired just before the writ was dropped in 2011. The 2011 Election was contested between Progressive Conservative nominee Paul Lane, a Mount Pearl city councillor, New Democrat John Riche, a Real Estate Agent and Liberal Norm Snelgrove, a civic administrator. Paul Lane won the 2011 contest by 700 votes on October 11, 2011, and remained the district's MHA until its dissolution.

On January 20, 2014, Paul Lane announced he was leaving the governing PC Party to sit with the Opposition Liberal Party. In 2015, an electoral district boundary review resulted in the districts dissolution, with its territory being incorporated into Mount Pearl-Southlands.

== Members of the House of Assembly ==
The district had elected the following members of the House of Assembly:

Assembly	Years	Member	Party
37th	1975–1979	Neil Windsor	Progressive Conservative
38th	1979–1982	Neil Windsor	Progressive Conservative
39th	1982–1985	Neil Windsor	Progressive Conservative
40th	1985–1989	Neil Windsor	Progressive Conservative
41st	1989–1993	Neil Windsor	Progressive Conservative
42nd	1993–1996	Neil Windsor	Progressive Conservative
43rd	1996–1999	Julie Bettney	Liberal
43rd	1999–2003	Julie Bettney	Liberal
44th	2003–2007	Dave Denine	Progressive Conservative
45th	2007–2011	Dave Denine	Progressive Conservative
46th	2011–2014	Paul Lane	Progressive Conservative
46th	2014–2015	Paul Lane	Liberal

== Election results ==
2011 Newfoundland and Labrador general election
Party	Candidate	Votes	%	±%
Progressive Conservative	Paul Lane	2,375	54.61	-29.73
NDP	John Riche	1,675	38.51	+31.78
Liberal	Norm Snelgrove	299	6.88	-2.05

2007 Newfoundland and Labrador general election
Party	Candidate	Votes	%	±%
Progressive Conservative	Dave Denine	4,163	84.34	+3.04
Liberal	Bill Reid	441	8.93	-2.53
NDP	Tom McGinnis	332	6.73	-0.51

2003 Newfoundland and Labrador general election: Mount Pearl
Party	Candidate	Votes	%	±%
Progressive Conservative	Dave Denine	5,662	81.30	–
Liberal	Wayne Ralph	798	11.46	
NDP	Roy Locke	504	7.24	

== See also ==
- List of Newfoundland and Labrador provincial electoral districts
- Canadian provincial electoral districts
