= Helen Conway-Ottenheimer =

Canadian politician

The Honourable Helen Conway-Ottenheimer ECNL KC MHA

Member of the Newfoundland and Labrador House of Assembly for Harbour Main
- Incumbent
- Assumed office May 16, 2019
- Preceded by: Betty Parsley

Minister of Justice, Public Safety, and Attorney General
- Incumbent
- Assumed office October 29, 2025
- Preceded by: John Haggie

Minister of Women and Gender Equality
- In office October 29, 2025 – February 24, 2026
- Preceded by: Sherry Gambin-Walsh
- Succeeded by: Lela Evans

Minister of Emergency Preparedness and Disaster Management
- In office October 29, 2025 – February 23, 2026
- Preceded by: Office Established
- Succeeded by: Pleaman Forsey

Personal details
- Born: Helen Conway
- Party: Progressive Conservative
- Spouse: John Ottenheimer
- Occupation: Lawyer

Helen Conway-Ottenheimer (née Conway) is a Canadian politician, who was elected to the Newfoundland and Labrador House of Assembly in the 2019 provincial election. She represents the electoral district of Harbour Main as a member of the Newfoundland and Labrador Progressive Conservative Party.

== Background ==
Conway-Ottenheimer served on the executive of the youth branch of the PC Party, and became its president at age 20. She is a lawyer by trade and has practiced in the areas of human rights law and criminal defence.

== Politics ==
Conway-Ottenheimer was first elected in the 2019 provincial election. She was re-elected in the 2021 provincial election.

Conway-Ottenheimer was re-elected in the 2025 Newfoundland and Labrador general election.

On October 29, 2025, Conway-Ottenheimer was appointed to the Executive Council as Minister of Justice and Public Safety, Attorney General, Minister Emergency Preparedness and Disaster Management, Minister of Women and Gender Equality, Minister Responsible for Access to Information and Protection of Privacy Office, Minister Responsible for the Human Rights Commission.

On February 23, 2026, Conway-Ottenheimer was succeeded by Pleaman Forsey in the role of Minister of Emergency Preparedness and Disaster Management. The next day, she was also succeeded in the role of Minister of Women and Gender Equality by Lela Evans.

On July 24, 2026, it was announced that Conway-Ottenheimer had been appointed to the King's Counsel.

On September 17, 2026, Conway-Ottenheimer voted to approve the Churchill Falls Definitive Cooperation and Implementation Agreement (DCIA) in the House of Assembly along with the PC caucus.

== Personal life ==
Conway-Ottenheimer is married to former MHA John Ottenheimer and resides in Marysvale.

== Electoral record ==
2025 Newfoundland and Labrador general election: Harbour Main
Party	Candidate	Votes	%	±%
Progressive Conservative	Helen Conway-Ottenheimer	4,187	61.2%	+6.73
Liberal	Don Lewis	2,297	33.6%	-8.02
New Democratic	Dion Hynes	263	3.8%	-0.11
Independent	Clem Whittle	93	1.4%	
Total valid votes				
Total rejected ballots				
Turnout				
Eligible voters				
Progressive Conservative hold		Swing		+7%

2021 Newfoundland and Labrador general election: Harbour Main
Party	Candidate	Votes	%	±%
Progressive Conservative	Helen Conway-Ottenheimer	3,180	54.47	-5.62
Liberal	George Murphy	2,430	41.62	+10.98
New Democratic	Tony Chadwick	228	3.91	
Total valid votes		5,838	98.80	
Total rejected ballots		71	1.20	
Turnout		5,909	53.70	
Eligible voters		11,004		
Progressive Conservative hold		Swing		-8.30
Source(s) "Officially Nominated Candidates General Election 2021" (PDF). Elections Newfoundland and Labrador. "NL Election 2021 Report" (PDF).

2019 Newfoundland and Labrador general election
Party	Candidate	Votes	%	±%
Progressive Conservative	Helen Conway-Ottenheimer	4,169	60.09	+25.14
Liberal	Betty Parsley	2,126	30.64	-8.77
NL Alliance	Mike Cooze	643	9.27	–
Total valid votes		6,938	99.19	
Total rejected ballots		57	0.81	+0.07
Turnout		6,995	69.85	+13.43
Eligible voters		10,014		
Progressive Conservative gain from Liberal		Swing		+16.95
