= Ronald Fahey =

Canadian politician

Ronald J. Fahey (1905–1952) was a labour leader and politician in Newfoundland. He represented Harbour Main-Bell Island in the Newfoundland House of Assembly from 1949 to 1951.

He was born in St. John's and began work at the Reid Newfoundland Company dockyards there at the age of sixteen. In 1935, he became a member of the executive for the International Association of Machinists local. In 1937, he was a founding member of the Newfoundland Trades and Labour Council (later the Newfoundland Federation of Labour), serving as its eastern vice-president and as a member of the St. John's executive. In 1946, he became president of the Federation of Labour.

Fahey opposed union with Canada but was elected to the Newfoundland assembly in 1949. He did not run for reelection in 1951 due to poor health and died the following year at the age of 47.
