= Paul Connors =

Canadian politician

Paul Connors MP

Member of Parliament for Avalon
- Incumbent
- Assumed office April 28, 2025
- Preceded by: Ken McDonald

Personal details
- Born: Bell Island, Newfoundland
- Party: Liberal
- Website: paulconnors.liberal.ca

Paul Connors MP is a Canadian politician from the Liberal Party of Canada. He was elected Member of Parliament for Avalon in the 2025 Canadian federal election.

Previously, Connors was the executive director for the Newfoundland and Labrador Federation of Agriculture for fourteen years. Connors previously served as the executive assistant to Ken McDonald before running. He served on the Town Council of Conception Bay South from 2013 to 2017 and from 2021 to 2025.

At the time of the 2025 Canadian federal election, he lived in Conception Bay South.

== Electoral record ==
2025 Canadian federal election: Avalon
Party	Candidate	Votes	%	±%	Expenditures
Liberal	Paul Connors	27,563	58.61	+7.73	$65,090.03
Conservative	Steve Kent	16,953	36.05	+3.01	$125,003.56
New Democratic	Judy Vanta	2,284	4.86	−9.39	$0.00
Rhinoceros	Alexander Tilley	230	0.49	N/A	$0.00
Total valid votes/expense limit		47,030	99.18	-0.10	$127,183.68
Total rejected ballots		389	0.82	+0.10	
Turnout		47,419	66.92		
Eligible voters		70,859			
Liberal notional hold		Swing		+2.36	
Source: Elections Canada
