= Eric Gullage =

Canadian politician

Eric A. Gullage (1942 – July 3, 2007) was a politician in Newfoundland. He represented Waterford-Kenmount in the Newfoundland House of Assembly from 1988 to 1993 in Canada.

Gullage worked as a manager for a life insurance company. He served as a member of the city council for St. John's from 1973 to 1976 and from 1985 to 1989.

He was elected to the Newfoundland assembly in a 1988 by-election and was reelected in 1989. Gullage served in the provincial cabinet as Minister of Municipal and Provincial Affairs and as Minister of Housing and Social Services. He was defeated when he ran for reelection in 1993.

In 1994, Gullage was named chief review commissioner for the review tribunal of the Workers' Compensation Commission.

He died of cancer in 2007.
