= Matthew Whelan (politician) =

Canadian politician

Matthew P. Whelan

Member of the Newfoundland and Labrador House of Assembly for Harbour Main
- In office 1956–1959 Serving with Philip J. Lewis
- Preceded by: David Ignatius Jackman
- Succeeded by: Albert E. Furey

Personal details
- Born: August 16, 1916 Colliers, Newfoundland
- Died: June 9, 2000 (aged 83) St. John's, Newfoundland and Labrador, Canada
- Party: Liberal Party of Newfoundland and Labrador
- Occupation: Businessman

Matthew Patrick Whelan (August 16, 1916 – June 9, 2000) was a Canadian politician who was elected to the Newfoundland and Labrador House of Assembly in the 1956 provincial election. He represented the electoral district of Harbour Main as a member of the Liberal Party of Newfoundland and Labrador.

Whelan was born in Colliers, Newfoundland in 1916. He resided in his hometown and was a businessman. He also served in the Royal Navy in World War II from 1939 to 1942. Whelan married Bride Cole in 1947 and had nine children. He was a member of the Roman Catholic church.
