= Avalon (electoral district) =

Federal electoral district in Newfoundland and Labrador, Canada

Coordinates: 47.29°N 53.35°W

Newfoundland and Labrador electoral district
- Interactive map of riding boundaries from the 2025 federal election

Federal electoral district
- Legislature: House of Commons
MP
Paul Connors
Liberal
- District created: 2003
- First contested: 2004
- Last contested: 2025
- District webpage: profile, map

Demographics
- Population (2016): 86,494
- Electors (2025): 69,890
- Area (km²): 6,457.79
- Pop. density (per km²): 13.4
- Census division: Division 1
- Census subdivision(s): St. John's (part), Conception Bay South, Bay Roberts, Carbonear, Harbour Grace, Spaniard's Bay, Holyrood, Victoria, Witless Bay, Bay Bulls

Avalon is a federal electoral district on Newfoundland Island in Newfoundland and Labrador, Canada. It has been represented in the House of Commons of Canada, with varying boundaries, since 2004.

== Demographics ==
According to the 2021 Canadian census; 2023 representation

Racial groups: 96.3% White, 2.7% Indigenous
Languages: 99.2% English
Religions: 86.2% Christian (38.9% Catholic, 25.8% Anglican, 11.8% United Church, 3.0% Methodist, 2.7% Pentecostal, 3.9% Other), 13.5% No religion
Median income (2020): $38.800
Average income (2020): $49,560

== Geography ==
The neighbouring ridings are Terra Nova—The Peninsulas to the west and north, and Cape Spear (electoral district) and St. John's East to the east.

== Political geography ==
Avalon is divided between the Liberal north and the Conservative south. Conservative support is found along the southern coast from the community of Bay Bulls to Southern Harbour. The Conservatives also have some concentration in the north central peninsula, including winning the town of Harbour Grace. The Liberals dominate the central and northern parts of the riding. In 2008, the NDP won two polls, one was a mobile poll, and the other contained the community of Hopeall. The Greens also won a poll in Witless Bay.

== History ==
The electoral district was created in 2003 from 57.6% of Bonavista—Trinity—Conception, 21.9% of St. John's West and 20.5% of St. John's East ridings.

The 2012 federal electoral boundaries redistribution concluded that the electoral boundaries of Avalon should be adjusted. The redefined Avalon had its boundaries legally defined in the 2013 representation order which came into effect upon the call of the 42nd Canadian federal election, scheduled for October 2015. 21% of this riding will be moved into Bonavista—Burin—Trinity, and 3% will be moved into St. John's South—Mount Pearl, and will gain 25% of its new territory from St. John's East. It was given the boundaries described above.

Following the 2022 Canadian federal electoral redistribution, the riding lost the eastern shore of Placentia Bay to Terra Nova—The Peninsulas, gained Salmon Cove from Bonavista—Burin—Trinity, lost the remainder of Paradise to Cape Spear, gain Witless Bay, Bay Bulls and the Southlands and Goulds areas of St. John's from St. John's South—Mount Pearl. These changes came into effect upon the calling of the 2025 Canadian federal election.

=== Members of Parliament ===
This riding has elected the following members of Parliament:

Parliament	Years	Member	Party
Avalon; Riding created from Bonavista—Trinity—Conception, St. John's East and St. John's West
38th	2004–2006	John Efford	Liberal
39th	2006–2008	Fabian Manning	Conservative
40th	2008–2011	Scott Andrews	Liberal
41st	2011–2014	Scott Andrews	Liberal
41st	2014–2015	Scott Andrews	Independent
42nd	2015–2019	Ken McDonald	Liberal
43rd	2019–2021	Ken McDonald	Liberal
44th	2021–2025	Ken McDonald	Liberal
45th	2025–present	Paul Connors	Liberal

== Election results ==
=== 2025 ===
2025 Canadian federal election
Party	Candidate	Votes	%	±%	Expenditures
Liberal	Paul Connors	27,563	58.61	+7.73	
Conservative	Steve Kent	16,953	36.05	+3.01	
New Democratic	Judy Vanta	2,284	4.86	−9.39	
Rhinoceros	Alexander Tilley	230	0.49	N/A	
Total valid votes/expense limit		47,030	99.18		
Total rejected ballots		389	0.82		
Turnout		47,419	66.92		
Eligible voters		70,859			
Liberal notional hold		Swing		+2.36	
Source: Elections Canada

2021 Election Results by Polling Area

=== 2021 ===
2021 federal election redistributed results
Party	Vote	%
Liberal	17,916	50.88
Conservative	11,636	33.04
New Democratic	5,019	14.25
People's	643	1.83

2021 Canadian federal election
Party	Candidate	Votes	%	±%	Expenditures
Liberal	Ken McDonald	18,608	50.10	+3.83	$46,697.12
Conservative	Matthew Chapman	12,738	34.29	+3.19	$56,179.94
New Democratic	Carolyn Davis	5,151	13.87	−3.41	$0.00
People's	Lainie Stewart	647	1.74	–	$0.00
Total valid votes/expense limit		37,144	99.27		$110,063.67
Total rejected ballots		273	0.73	–0.22	
Turnout		37,417	52.77	–6.55	
Registered voters		70,903			
Liberal hold		Swing		+0.32	
Source: Elections Canada

=== 2019 ===
2019 Canadian federal election
Party	Candidate	Votes	%	±%	Expenditures
Liberal	Ken McDonald	19,122	46.26	−9.64	$63,518.25
Conservative	Matthew Chapman	12,855	31.10	+20.00	$37,082.47
New Democratic	Lea Mary Movelle	7,142	17.28	+2.85	none listed
Green	Greg Malone	2,215	5.36	+4.82	none listed
Total valid votes/expense limit		41,334	99.05	-0.57	$104,436.05
Total rejected ballots		397	0.95	+0.57	
Turnout		41,731	59.33	−2.36	
Eligible voters		70,341			
Liberal hold		Swing		−14.82	
Source: Elections Canada

=== 2015 ===
2015 Canadian federal election
Party	Candidate	Votes	%	±%	Expenditures
Liberal	Ken McDonald	23,528	55.90	+22.73	$70,924.68
Independent	Scott Andrews	7,501	17.82	–26.15	$63,334.50
New Democratic	Jeannie Baldwin	6,075	14.43	–14.10	$70,840.75
Conservative	Lorraine E. Barnett	4,670	11.10	–26.00	$58,123.54
Green	Krista Byrne-Puumala	228	0.54	–0.09	$76.49
Strength in Democracy	Jennifer McCreath	84	0.20	–	–
Total valid votes/expense limit		42,086	100.00		$208,407.32
Total rejected ballots		162	0.38		
Turnout		42,248	62.33		
Eligible voters		67,781			
Liberal notional gain from Independent		Swing		+24.36	
Source: Elections Canada

2011 federal election redistributed results
Party	Vote	%
Conservative	13,214	37.09
Liberal	11,820	33.18
New Democratic	10,164	28.53
Green	226	0.63
Others	201	0.56

=== 2011 ===
In the 2011 election, the Liberal candidate was the incumbent MP, Scott Andrews, a former municipal councillor from Conception Bay South. He defeated the Tory candidate, Senator Fabian Manning of St. Bride's, for the second election in a row. Manning was the Conservative MP for this riding from 2006 to 2008, when he lost to Andrews.

2011 Canadian federal election
Party	Candidate	Votes	%	±%	Expenditures
Liberal	Scott Andrews	16,008	43.97	-1.31	$71,517.62
Conservative	Fabian Manning	14,749	40.51	+5.35	$85,098.25
New Democratic	Matthew Martin Fuchs	5,157	14.16	-3.22	$3,735.98
Independent	Randy Wayne Dawe	276	0.76	–	$1,060.00
Green	Matt Crowder	218	0.60	-1.57	$11.96
Total valid votes/expense limit		36,408	100.0	–	$85,411.40
Total rejected, declined and unmarked ballots		166	0.45	-0.34	
Turnout		36,574	56.77	+4.97	
Eligible voters		64,424			
Liberal hold		Swing		-3.33	

=== 2008 ===
2008 Canadian federal election
Party	Candidate	Votes	%	±%	Expenditures
Liberal	Scott Andrews	14,866	45.28	+6.70	$68,253
Conservative	Fabian Manning	11,542	35.16	-16.39	$54,159
New Democratic	Randy Wayne Dawe	5,707	17.38	+8.31	$25,080
Green	Dave Aylward	714	2.17	+1.37	$766
Total valid votes/expense limit		32,829	100.0	–	$82,453
Total rejected, declined and unmarked ballots		262	0.79	-0.86	
Turnout		33,091	51.80	-7.81	
Eligible voters		63,882			
Liberal gain from Conservative		Swing		+11.54	

=== 2006 ===
2006 Canadian federal election
Party	Candidate	Votes	%	±%	Expenditures
Conservative	Fabian Manning	19,132	51.55	+22.24	$71,141
Liberal	Bill Morrow	14,318	38.58	-19.76	$71,528
New Democratic	Eugene Conway	3,365	9.07	-1.91	$1,036
Green	Shannon Hillier	297	0.80	-0.57	none listed
Total valid votes/expense limit		37,112	100.0	–	$76,596
Total rejected, declined and unmarked ballots		623	1.65	+0.59	
Turnout		37,735	59.61	+9.78	
Eligible voters		63,303			
Conservative gain from Liberal		Swing		+21.00	

=== 2004 ===
2004 Canadian federal election
Party	Candidate	Votes	%	±%	Expenditures
Liberal	R. John Efford	18,335	58.34	+12.41	$47,245
Conservative	Rick Dalton	9,211	29.31	-10.37	$50,104
New Democratic	Michael Kehoe	3,450	10.98	-3.24	$2,472
Green	Don C. Ferguson	430	1.37	–	$746
Total valid votes/expense limit		31,246	100.0	–	$74,947
Total rejected, declined and unmarked ballots		336	1.06		
Turnout		31,762	49.83		
Eligible voters		63,745			
Liberal notional hold		Swing		+11.39	
Changes from 2000 are based on redistributed results. Change for the Conservatives is from the combined totals of the Progressive Conservatives and the Canadian Alliance.

2000 federal election redistributed results
Party	Vote	%
Liberal	17,614	45.93
Progressive Conservative	14,412	37.58
New Democratic	5,454	14.22
Alliance	805	2.10
Others	66	0.17

== Student vote results ==
=== 2025 ===
2025 Canadian federal election
Party	Candidate	Votes	%
Liberal	Paul Connors	1,215	39.80
Conservative	Steve Kent	1,162	38.06
New Democratic	Judy Vanta	379	12.41
Rhinoceros	Alexander Tilley	297	9.73
Total votes		3,053	100
Source: Student Vote Canada

== 2021 ==
2021 Canadian federal election
Party	Candidate	Votes	%
Liberal	Ken McDonald	857	36.77
New Democratic	Carolyn Davis	707	30.33
Conservative	Matthew Chapman	622	26.68
People's	Lainie Stewart	145	6.22
Total votes		2,331	100
Source: Student Vote Canada

=== 2019 ===
2019 Canadian federal election
Party	Candidate	Votes	%	±%
Liberal	Kenneth McDonald	1,332	30.35	-24.69
New Democratic	Lea Mary Movelle	1,292	29.44	+14.74
Conservative	Matthew Chapman	1,045	23.81	+17.03
Green	Greg Malone	720	16.4	+12.4
Total Valid Votes		4,389	100.0	–
Source: Student Vote Canada

=== 2015 ===
2015 Canadian federal election
Party	Candidate	Votes	%	±%
Liberal	Ken McDonald	633	55.04	+6.32
Independent	Scott Andrews	212	18.43	-30.29
New Democratic	Jeannie Baldwin	169	14.7	+3.33
Conservative	Lorraine E. Barnett	78	6.78	-22.74
Green	Krista Byrne-Puumala	46	4	-3.86
Strength in Democracy	Jennifer McCreath	12	1.04	–
Total Valid Votes		1,150	100.0	–
Source: Student Vote Canada

=== 2011 ===
2011 Canadian federal election
Party	Candidate	Votes	%
Liberal	Scott Andrews	972	48.72
Conservative	Fabian Manning	589	29.52
New Democratic	Matthew Martin Fuchs	227	11.37
Green	Matt Crowder	157	7.86
Independent	Randy Wayne Dawe	50	2.5
Total Valid Votes		1,995	100.0
Source: Student Vote Canada

== See also ==
- List of Canadian electoral districts
- Historical federal electoral districts of Canada
