= Harbour Main =

Provincial electoral district in Newfoundland and Labrador, Canada

Newfoundland and Labrador electoral district
- Harbour Main in relation to other districts in Newfoundland

Provincial electoral district
- Legislature: Newfoundland and Labrador House of Assembly
MHA
Helen Conway-Ottenheimer
Progressive Conservative
- District created: 1949
- First contested: 1949
- Last contested: 2025

Demographics
- Population (2011): 14,885
- Electors (2015): 10,208
- Area (km²): 435
- Census division: Division No. 1
- Census subdivision(s): Avondale, Brigus, Clarke's Beach, Colliers, Conception Bay South (part), Conception Harbour, Cupids, Division No. 1, Subd. M, Division No. 1, Subd. N, Division No. 1, Subd. O (part), Harbour Main-Chapel's Cove-Lakeview, Holyrood, North River, South River

Harbour Main, formerly Harbour Main-Whitbourne and Harbour Main-Bell Island, is a provincial electoral district for the House of Assembly of Newfoundland and Labrador, Canada. From 1949 to 1975, the district elected two MHAs.

Between 1972 and the year 2000, it was a Tory stronghold, apart from a two-term Liberal breakthrough in the 1990s.

It includes the southern portion of the town of Conception Bay South and the town of Holyrood, the farthest extern of the St. John's Metropolitan Area. In 2011 the district had 9,005 eligible voters.

In pre-Confederation times when Newfoundland was a colony unto itself, Harbour Main was a district in elections of members of the General Assembly of Newfoundland.

== Members of the House of Assembly ==
The district has elected the following members of the House of Assembly:

=== Dual-member district ===
Legislature	Years	Member	Party	Member	Party
Harbour Main—Bell Island
29th	1949–1952	David Ignatius Jackman	Progressive Conservative	Ronald J. Fahey	Progressive Conservative
30th	1952–1956	David Ignatius Jackman	Progressive Conservative	Philip J. Lewis	Liberal
Harbour Main
31st	1956–1959	Matthew P. Whelan	Liberal	Philip J. Lewis	Liberal
32nd	1959–1962	Albert Furey	Progressive Conservative	Philip J. Lewis	Liberal
33rd	1962–1966	Clifton Joseph Joy	Liberal	Philip J. Lewis	Liberal
34th	1966–1971	John William Mahoney	Liberal	Philip J. Lewis	Liberal
35th	1972	Gordon William Dawe	Progressive Conservative	C. William Doody	Progressive Conservative
36th	1972–1975	Gordon William Dawe	Progressive Conservative	C. William Doody	Progressive Conservative

=== Single-member district ===
Assembly	Years	Member	Party
Harbour Main—Bell Island
37th	1975–1979	C. William Doody	Progressive Conservative
38th	1979–1982	Norman Doyle	Progressive Conservative
39th	1982–1985	Norman Doyle	Progressive Conservative
Harbour Main
40th	1985–1989	Norman Doyle	Progressive Conservative
41st	1989–1993	Norman Doyle	Progressive Conservative
42nd	1993–1996	Don Whelan	Liberal
Harbour Main—Whitbourne
43rd	1996–1999	Don Whelan	Liberal
44th	1999–2003	Tom Hedderson	Progressive Conservative
45th	2003–2007	Tom Hedderson	Progressive Conservative
Harbour Main
46th	2007–2011	Tom Hedderson	Progressive Conservative
47th	2011–2015	Tom Hedderson	Progressive Conservative
48th	2015–2019	Betty Parsley	Liberal
49th	2019–2021	Helen Conway-Ottenheimer	Progressive Conservative
50th	2021–2025	Helen Conway-Ottenheimer	Progressive Conservative
51st	2025–Present	Helen Conway-Ottenheimer	Progressive Conservative

== Election results ==
Graph of election results (minor parties that never got 2% of the vote or did not run consistently are omitted) View source data.

2025 Newfoundland and Labrador general election
Party	Candidate	Votes	%	±%
Progressive Conservative	Helen Conway-Ottenheimer	4,187	61.2%	+6.73
Liberal	Don Lewis	2,297	33.6%	-8.02
New Democratic	Dion Hynes	263	3.8%	-0.11
Independent	Clem Whittle	93	1.4%	
Total valid votes				
Total rejected ballots				
Turnout				
Eligible voters				
Progressive Conservative hold		Swing		+7%

2021 Newfoundland and Labrador general election
Party	Candidate	Votes	%	±%
Progressive Conservative	Helen Conway-Ottenheimer	3,180	54.47	-5.62
Liberal	George Murphy	2,430	41.62	+10.98
New Democratic	Tony Chadwick	228	3.91	
Total valid votes		5,838	98.80	
Total rejected ballots		71	1.20	
Turnout		5,909	53.70	
Eligible voters		11,004		
Progressive Conservative hold		Swing		-8.30
Source(s) "Officially Nominated Candidates General Election 2021" (PDF). Elections Newfoundland and Labrador. "NL Election 2021 Report" (PDF).

2019 Newfoundland and Labrador general election
Party	Candidate	Votes	%	±%
Progressive Conservative	Helen Conway-Ottenheimer	4,169	60.09	+25.14
Liberal	Betty Parsley	2,126	30.64	-8.77
NL Alliance	Mike Cooze	643	9.27	–
Total valid votes		6,938	99.19	
Total rejected ballots		57	0.81	+0.07
Turnout		6,995	69.85	+13.43
Eligible voters		10,014		
Progressive Conservative gain from Liberal		Swing		+16.95

2015 Newfoundland and Labrador general election
Party	Candidate	Votes	%	±%
Liberal	Betty Parsley	2,253	39.41	+28.19
Progressive Conservative	Curtis Buckle	1,998	34.95	-34.68
New Democratic	Raymond Flaherty	1,381	24.16	+5.01
Independent	Ted Noseworthy	85	1.49	
Total valid votes		5,717	99.25	
Total rejected ballots		43	0.75	+0.30
Turnout		5,760	56.43	-0.65
Eligible voters		10,208		
Liberal gain from Progressive Conservative		Swing		+31.44
Source: Elections Newfoundland and Labrador

2011 Newfoundland and Labrador general election
Party	Candidate	Votes	%	±%
Progressive Conservative	Tom Hedderson	3,600	69.63	-13.09
New Democratic	Mike Maher	990	19.15	+13.32
Liberal	Bern Hickey	580	11.22	-0.23
Total valid votes		5,170	99.56	–
Total rejected ballots		23	0.44	–
Turnout		5,193	57.08	
Eligible voters		9,098		
Progressive Conservative hold		Swing		-13.21
Source: Elections Newfoundland and Labrador

2007 Newfoundland and Labrador general election
Party	Candidate	Votes	%	±%
Progressive Conservative	Tom Hedderson	4,586	82.72	+12.00
Liberal	Kevin Slaney	635	11.45	-10.52
New Democratic	Jean Dandenault	323	5.83	-1.48
Total valid votes		5,544	99.43	–
Total rejected ballots		32	0.57	–
Turnout		5,576	62.51	-7.55
Eligible voters		8,920		
Progressive Conservative hold		Swing		+11.26
Source: Elections Newfoundland and Labrador

2003 Newfoundland and Labrador general election
Party	Candidate	Votes	%	±%
Progressive Conservative	Tom Hedderson	4,769	70.72	+15.81
Liberal	Fred Akerman	1,482	21.97	-15.47
New Democratic	Eugene Conway	493	7.31	-0.34
Total valid votes		6,744	99.73	–
Total rejected ballots		18	0.27	–
Turnout		6,762	70.06	+2.30
Eligible voters		9,652		
Progressive Conservative hold		Swing		+15.64
Source: Elections Newfoundland and Labrador

1999 Newfoundland and Labrador general election
Party	Candidate	Votes	%	±%
Progressive Conservative	Tom Hedderson	3,670	54.91	+13.14
Liberal	Wanda Dawe	2,502	37.44	-15.17
New Democratic	Fred Akerman	511	7.65	+3.96
Total valid votes		6,683	99.76	–
Total rejected ballots		16	0.24	–
Turnout		6,699	67.76	-3.01
Eligible voters		9,886		
Progressive Conservative gain from Liberal		Swing		+14.16
Source: Elections Newfoundland and Labrador

1996 Newfoundland and Labrador general election
Party	Candidate	Votes	%	±%
Liberal	Don Whelan	3,407	52.61	+6.82
Progressive Conservative	Eugene Conway	2,705	41.77	-1.69
New Democratic	Gus Flannigan	239	3.69	-7.06
Independent	Norm Sylvia	125	1.93	+1.93
Total valid votes		6,476	99.83	–
Total rejected ballots		11	0.17	–
Turnout		6,487	70.77	+2.28
Eligible voters		9,167		
Liberal hold		Swing		+4.26
Source: Elections Newfoundland and Labrador

1993 Newfoundland and Labrador general election
Party	Candidate	Votes	%	±%
Liberal	Don Whelan	3,310	45.79	+22.17
Progressive Conservative	Randy Simms	3,141	43.46	-22.13
New Democratic	Gus Flannigan	777	10.75	-0.04
Total valid votes		7,228	99.75	–
Total rejected ballots		18	0.25	–
Turnout		7,246	68.49	-10.16
Eligible voters		10,580		
Liberal gain from Progressive Conservative		Swing		+22.15
Source: Elections Newfoundland and Labrador

1989 Newfoundland and Labrador general election
Party	Candidate	Votes	%	±%
Progressive Conservative	Norman Doyle	4,123	65.59	+6.71
Liberal	Rod Fowler	1,485	23.62	+17.43
New Democratic	Gus Flannigan	678	10.79	-24.14
Total valid votes		6,286	99.46	–
Total rejected ballots		34	0.54	–
Turnout		6,320	78.65	-0.62
Eligible voters		8,036		
Progressive Conservative hold		Swing		+12.07
Source: Elections Newfoundland and Labrador

1985 Newfoundland and Labrador general election
Party	Candidate	Votes	%	±%
Progressive Conservative	Norman Doyle	3,784	58.88	-18.36
New Democratic	George J. Flaherty	2,245	34.93	+31.80
Liberal	Jerry J. Lewis	398	6.19	-13.44
Total valid votes		6,427	99.67	–
Total rejected ballots		21	0.33	–
Turnout		6,448	79.27	-2.40
Eligible voters		8,134		
Progressive Conservative hold		Swing		-25.08
Source: Elections Newfoundland and Labrador

1982 Newfoundland and Labrador general election
Party	Candidate	Votes	%	±%
Progressive Conservative	Norman Doyle	4,238	77.24	+16.57
Liberal	Joe Furey	1,077	19.63	-11.70
New Democratic	Bill Healey	172	3.13	-1.29
Total valid votes		5,487	99.33	–
Total rejected ballots		37	0.67	–
Turnout		5,524	81.67	+5.75
Eligible voters		6,764		
Progressive Conservative hold		Swing		+14.14
Source: Elections Newfoundland and Labrador

1979 Newfoundland and Labrador general election
Party	Candidate	Votes	%	±%
Progressive Conservative	Norman Doyle	3,100	60.67	-5.29
Liberal	Thomas Moore	1,601	31.33	-2.71
New Democratic	Margaret Peddle	226	4.42	+4.42
Independent	Michael J. Laurie	183	3.58	+3.58
Total valid votes		5,110	99.51	–
Total rejected ballots		25	0.49	–
Turnout		5,135	75.92	+6.68
Eligible voters		6,764		
Progressive Conservative hold		Swing		-4.00
Source: Elections Newfoundland and Labrador

1975 Newfoundland general election
Party	Candidate	Votes	%	±%
Progressive Conservative	William Doody	2,944	65.96	-12.45
Liberal	Wilfred Drover	1,519	34.04	+21.27
Total valid votes		4,463	99.38	–
Total rejected ballots		28	0.62	–
Turnout		4,491	69.24	
Eligible voters		6,486		
Progressive Conservative hold		Swing		+16.86
Source: Elections Newfoundland and Labrador

1972 Newfoundland general election
Party	Candidate	Votes	%	±%	Elected
Progressive Conservative	Gordon Dawe	5,181	40.09	+11.97	√
Progressive Conservative	William Doody	4,953	38.32	+12.32	√
Liberal	Richard Gosse	1,651	12.77	–	
Independent	Hugh Joseph Shea	1,140	8.82	–	
Total valid votes		12,925	–		
Total rejected ballots		48	–		
Eligible voters		9,389			
Source: Elections Newfoundland and Labrador

1971 Newfoundland general election
Party	Candidate	Votes	%	±%	Elected
Progressive Conservative	Gordon Dawe	4,417	28.12	+4.36	√
Progressive Conservative	William Doody	4,084	26.00		√
Liberal	John W. Mahoney	3,605	22.95	–3.67	
Liberal	Ralph E. Fagan	3,452	21.97	–	
New Democratic	Darrell Cole	151	0.96	–	
Total valid votes		15,709	–		

1966 Newfoundland general election
Party	Candidate	Votes	%	Elected
Liberal	Phillip J. Lewis	2,712	30.83	√
Liberal	John W. Mahoney	2,342	26.62	√
Progressive Conservative	Gordon Dawe	2,090	23.76	
Progressive Conservative	J. J. Carroll	1,120	12.73	
Independent	J. J. Hickey	534	6.07	–
Total valid votes		8,798	–	

== See also ==
- List of Newfoundland and Labrador provincial electoral districts
- Canadian provincial electoral districts
