= Paul Lane =

Canadian politician

The Honourable Paul Lane MHA

45th Speaker of the Newfoundland and Labrador House of Assembly
- Incumbent
- Assumed office November 3, 2025
- Preceded by: Derek Bennett

Member of the Newfoundland and Labrador House of Assembly for Mount Pearl-Southlands Mount Pearl South (2011-2015)
- Incumbent
- Assumed office October 11, 2011
- Preceded by: Dave Denine

Personal details
- Born: St. John's, Newfoundland
- Party: Independent
- Other political affiliations: Liberal Party (2014–2016); Progressive Conservative (2011–2014)

Paul Gerard Lane is a Canadian politician in the provincial legislature of Newfoundland and Labrador, Canada. He represents the electoral district of Mount Pearl-Southlands in the Newfoundland and Labrador House of Assembly.

== Early life ==
Prior to entering politics, Lane worked as an occupational health and safety professional and disability claims manager.

== Political career ==
Born and raised in St. John's, Newfoundland and Labrador, Lane resides in the suburban community of Mount Pearl, where he was a city councillor and deputy mayor prior to his election to the provincial legislature.

Lane was first elected in the 2011 provincial election as a member of the Progressive Conservative Party of Newfoundland and Labrador (PC). Following the election of a PC majority government in 2011, Lane was not appointed to the Cabinet. On January 20, 2014 Lane crossed the floor to the Liberal Party to protest the leadership of Premier Kathy Dunderdale. After leaving the PCs Lane apologized for his behavior in the House of Assembly and on social media, and distanced himself from the policies of the PCs, especially his prior outspoken support for curtailing access to information with Bill 29 and for the Muskrat Falls project.

Following the election of a Liberal majority government in 2015, Lane sat as a backbencher. In 2016, he was suspended from the Liberal caucus for voting with the opposition on a non-binding motion against the 2016 budget. Lane served as Chair of Committees. As an independent he frequently votes in support of the positions put forward by NDP MHAs.

After he left the Liberal Party, media reports surfaced that Lane was being sued for $28,000 in credit card arrears.

Lane won re-election in the 2019 provincial election as an independent candidate. He was re-elected again in the 2021 provincial election.

On January 13, 2022, Lane announced on Facebook that he tested positive for COVID-19.

Lane was re-elected in the 2025 Newfoundland and Labrador general election.

On November 3, 2025, Lane was sworn in as Speaker of the Newfoundland and Labrador House of Assembly.

== Electoral record ==
2025 Newfoundland and Labrador general election: Mount Pearl-Southlands
Party	Candidate	Votes	%	±%
Independent	Paul Lane	3,361	56.72	-2.89
Liberal	Sarah Furlong	1,682	28.38	+4.40
Progressive Conservative	Bryan Robbins	666	11.24	-2.55
New Democratic	Brenda Walsh	217	3.66	+1.03
Total valid votes		5,926		
Total rejected ballots				
Turnout				
Eligible voters				
Independent hold		Swing		-3.65

2021 Newfoundland and Labrador general election: Mount Pearl-Southlands
Party	Candidate	Votes	%	±%
Independent	Paul Lane	3,445	59.60	+15.85
Liberal	Karla Hayward	1,386	23.98	-4.32
Progressive Conservative	Cindy Grant	797	13.79	-10.85
New Democratic	Cara Krista Winsor	152	2.63	-0.69
Total valid votes		5,780	99.42	
Total rejected ballots		34	0.58	
Turnout		5,814	54.61	
Eligible voters		10,647		
Independent hold		Swing		+10.09
Source(s) "Officially Nominated Candidates General Election 2021" (PDF). Elections Newfoundland and Labrador. "NL Election 2021 (Unofficial Results)".

2019 Newfoundland and Labrador general election
Party	Candidate	Votes	%	±%
Independent	Paul Lane	2,823	43.7	–
Liberal	Hasan Hai	1,826	28.3	–
Progressive Conservative	Gillian Pearson	1,590	24.6	–
New Democratic	David Brake	214	3.3	–

2015 Newfoundland and Labrador general election
Party	Candidate	Votes	%	±%
Liberal	Paul Lane	2,559	47.4	–
Progressive Conservative	Jim Lester	2,318	42.9	–
New Democratic	Roy Locke	522	9.7	–

2011 Newfoundland and Labrador general election
Party	Candidate	Votes	%	±%
Progressive Conservative	Paul Lane	2,375	54.61	-29.73
NDP	John Riche	1,675	38.51	+31.78
Liberal	Norm Snelgrove	299	6.88	-2.05
