= Dave Denine =

Canadian politician

The Honourable Dave Denine ECNL

Member of the Newfoundland and Labrador House of Assembly for Mount Pearl South
- In office 2003 – September 19, 2011
- Preceded by: Julie Bettney
- Succeeded by: Paul Lane

Provincial Minister of Intergovernmental Affairs, Minister Responsible for the voluntary and Non-profit Sector, Minister of Municipal Affairs, Minister of Emergency Prepardness, And Registrar General
- In office 2008–2011
- Preceded by: Tom Hedderson
- Succeeded by: Nick McGrath

Personal details
- Born: Mount Pearl, Newfoundland and Labrador
- Party: Progressive Conservative

Dave Denine is a former Canadian politician in Newfoundland and Labrador, Canada. He served in the provincial cabinet from 2007 to 2011 as Minister of Intergovernmental Affairs.

Denine represented the district of Mount Pearl South in the Newfoundland and Labrador House of Assembly from 2003 to 2007 as a member of the Progressive Conservative Party. Denine was sworn in as the Minister of Municipal Affairs following the 2007 provincial election and later served as Minister of Intergovernmental Affairs.

Denine announced on July 12, 2011, that he would not be seeking re-election in that year's general election.
