= Clyde Jackman =

Canadian politician

The Honourable Clyde Jackman ECNL

Minister of Seniors, Wellness and Social Development of Newfoundland and Labrador
- In office September 30, 2014 – December 14, 2015
- Preceded by: Department Established
- Succeeded by: Sherry Gambin-Walsh

Member of the Newfoundland and Labrador House of Assembly for Burin-Placentia West
- In office November 12, 2003 – November 27, 2015
- Preceded by: Mary Hodder
- Succeeded by: District Abolished

Minister of Fisheries and Aquaculture of Newfoundland and Labrador
- In office November 27, 2009 – October 28, 2011
- Preceded by: Tom Hedderson
- Succeeded by: Darin King

Minister of Tourism, Culture and Recreation of Newfoundland and Labrador
- In office October 30, 2007 – November 27, 2009
- Preceded by: Tom Hedderson
- Succeeded by: Terry French

Minister of Environment and Conservation of Newfoundland and Labrador
- In office March 14, 2006 – October 30, 2007
- Preceded by: Tom Osborne
- Succeeded by: Charlene Johnson

Minister of Education of Newfoundland and Labrador

Personal details
- Born: 21 December 1954 (age 71) Bishop's Falls, Newfoundland and Labrador, Canada
- Party: Progressive Conservative
- Occupation: Teacher, Principal

Clyde Jackman (born December 21, 1954) is a former Canadian politician in Newfoundland and Labrador, Canada. He represented the district of Burin-Placentia West in the House of Assembly from 2003 until 2015 as a member of the Progressive Conservatives.

Jackman held several portfolios in the provincial cabinet including Minister of Education, Minister of Fisheries & Aquaculture, Minister of Tourism, Culture and Recreation, Minister of Environment and Conservation, and Minister of Seniors, Wellness and Social Development. Jackman did not seek re-election in the 2015 provincial election.

== Controversy ==
Jackman came under attack in February 2011, when a report, by a committee put in place by the government, recommended that the Department of Fisheries and Aquaculture invest $450 million to downsize the commercial fishery. Jackman announced immediately that he would not to endorse the report because he felt it would not solve the problems in the fishery. Lorraine Michael, the leader of the New Democratic Party, called on Jackman to resign his post as minister.

== Electoral history ==
2011 Newfoundland and Labrador general election
Party	Candidate	Votes	%	±%
Progressive Conservative	Clyde Jackman	2538	48.45%	–
NDP	Julie Mitchell	2498	47.69%	
Liberal	Jacqueline Mullett	202	3.86%	

2007 Newfoundland and Labrador general election
Party	Candidate	Votes	%	±%	
Progressive Conservative	Clyde Jackman	Clyde Jackman	3141	59.24%	–
NDP	Julie Mitchell	1704	32.14%		
Liberal	George Brake	457	8.62%		

2003 Newfoundland and Labrador general election
Party	Candidate	Votes	%	±%	
Progressive Conservative	Clyde Jackman	Clyde Jackman	3450	55.05%	+49.18%
Liberal	Sam Synard	2133	34.03%	-19.27%	
NDP	Wayne Butler	684	10.91%	-35.79%	
