= Mount Pearl North =

Provincial electoral district in Newfoundland and Labrador, Canada

Newfoundland and Labrador electoral district
- Location in the St. John's area
- Coordinates: 47.524°N 52.810°W

Provincial electoral district
- Legislature: Newfoundland and Labrador House of Assembly
MHA
Lucy Stoyles
Liberal
- District created: 2006
- First contested: 2007
- Last contested: 2025

Demographics
- Population (2011): 14,190
- Electors (2017): 9,976
- Area (km²): 15
- Census division: Division No. 1
- Census subdivision(s): Mount Pearl, St. John's

Mount Pearl North, formerly known as Waterford Valley, is a provincial electoral district for the House of Assembly of Newfoundland and Labrador, Canada. In 2011, there were 9,622 eligible voters living within the district.

This suburban district includes the northern part of the city of Mount Pearl and part of the city of St. John's. The district was created in 2007 using 79 per cent of the old Waterford Valley district and smaller sections of Mount Pearl and Topsail districts. The district was reconfigured in 2015.

== Members of the House of Assembly ==
The district has elected the following members of the House of Assembly:

Assembly	Years	Member	Party
Before 1975: see St. John's North
Waterford - Kenmount
37th	1975–1979	Gerry Ottenheimer	Progressive Conservative
38th	1979–1982	Gerry Ottenheimer	Progressive Conservative
39th	1982–1985	Gerry Ottenheimer	Progressive Conservative
40th	1985–1987	Gerry Ottenheimer	Progressive Conservative
40th	1988–1989	Eric Gullage	Liberal
41st	1989–1993	Eric Gullage	Liberal
42nd	1993–1996	Harvey Hodder	Progressive Conservative
Waterford Valley
43rd	1996–1999	Harvey Hodder	Progressive Conservative
44th	1999–2003	Harvey Hodder	Progressive Conservative
45th	2003–2007	Harvey Hodder	Progressive Conservative
Mount Pearl North
46th	2007–2011	Steve Kent	Progressive Conservative
47th	2011–2015	Steve Kent	Progressive Conservative
48th	2015–2017	Steve Kent	Progressive Conservative
48th	2017–2019	Jim Lester	Progressive Conservative
49th	2019–2021	Jim Lester	Progressive Conservative
50th	2021–2025	Lucy Stoyles	Liberal
51st	2025–Present	Lucy Stoyles	Liberal

== Election results ==
=== Mount Pearl North ===
Graph of election results (minor parties that never got 2% of the vote or did not run consistently are omitted) View source data.

2025 Newfoundland and Labrador general election
Party	Candidate	Votes	%	±%
Liberal	Lucy Stoyles	3,038	58.41	+11.72
Progressive Conservative	Jim Lester	1,733	33.32	-11.28
New Democratic	Donn Sears	430	8.27	+1.79
Total valid votes		5,201		
Total rejected ballots				
Turnout				
Eligible voters				
Liberal hold		Swing		+11.50

2021 Newfoundland and Labrador general election
Party	Candidate	Votes	%	±%
Liberal	Lucy Stoyles	2,428	46.69	+9.50
Progressive Conservative	Jim Lester	2,319	44.60	-4.64
New Democratic	Jennifer McCreath	337	6.48	+0.42
NL Alliance	William Neville	116	2.23	-5.27
Total valid votes		5,200	99.46	
Total rejected ballots		28	0.54	
Turnout		5,228	49.64	
Eligible voters		10,531		
Liberal gain from Progressive Conservative		Swing		+7.07
Source(s) "Officially Nominated Candidates General Election 2021" (PDF). Elections Newfoundland and Labrador. "NL Election 2021 (Unofficial Results)".

2019 Newfoundland and Labrador general election
Party	Candidate	Votes	%	±%
Progressive Conservative	Jim Lester	2,907	49.24	+2.36
Liberal	Nicole Kieley	2,196	37.20	+11.54
NL Alliance	William Neville	443	7.50	
New Democratic	Carol Reade	358	6.06	-18.66
Total valid votes		5,904	99.46	
Total rejected ballots		32	0.54	+0.15
Turnout		5,936	57.88	+14.65
Eligible voters		10,255		
Progressive Conservative hold		Swing		-4.59

Mount Pearl North By-Election — November 21, 2017 On the resignation of Steve Kent, October 11, 2017
Party	Candidate	Votes	%	±%
Progressive Conservative	Jim Lester	2,064	46.89	-4.59
Liberal	Jim Burton	1,129	25.65	-16.77
New Democratic	Nicole Kieley	1,088	24.72	+18.61
Independent	Hudson Stratton	121	2.75	
Total valid votes		4,402	99.62	
Total rejected and declined votes		17	0.38	
Turnout		4,419	44.30	
Electors on the lists		9,976		
Progressive Conservative hold		Swing		+6.09

2015 Newfoundland and Labrador general election
Party	Candidate	Votes	%	±%
Progressive Conservative	Steve Kent	3,120	51.48	-21.38
Liberal	Randy Simms	2,571	42.42	+35.28
New Democratic	Cameron Mercer-Maillet	370	6.10	-13.45
Total valid votes		6,061	99.51	
Turnout		6,091	62.64	
Electors on the lists		9,724		

2011 Newfoundland and Labrador general election
Party	Candidate	Votes	%	±%
Progressive Conservative	Steve Kent	3,727	73.31	-11.74
New Democratic	Kurtis Coombs	994	19.55	+13.64
Liberal	Maurice Budgell	363	7.14	-1.90
Total valid votes		5,084	99.24	
Total rejected and declined votes		39	0.76	+0.37
Turnout		5,123	51.93	-9.43
Electors on the lists		9,865		

2007 Newfoundland and Labrador general election
Party	Candidate	Votes	%
Progressive Conservative	Steve Kent	4,751	85.05
Liberal	Elaine Reid	504	9.04
New Democratic	Janice Lockyer	330	5.91
Total valid votes		5,586	99.61
Total rejected and declined votes		22	0.39
Turnout		5,608	61.36
Electors on the lists		9,140	

=== Waterford Valley ===
2003 Newfoundland and Labrador general election
Party	Candidate	Votes	%
Progressive Conservative	Harvey Hodder	4,569	73.03
Liberal	Averill Baker	1,277	20.41
New Democratic	Justin Locke	410	6.55
Total valid votes		6,256	99.87
Total rejected and declines votes		8	0.13
Turnout		6,264	66.81
Electors on the lists		9,376	

1999 Newfoundland and Labrador general election
Party	Candidate	Votes	%
Progressive Conservative	Harvey Hodder	3,480	54.38
Liberal	Paula M. Buckle	2,680	41.88
New Democratic	Bill Maddigan	239	3.73
Total valid votes		6,399	99.84
Total rejected and declines votes		10	0.16
Turnout		6,409	74.90
Electors on the lists		8,557	

1996 Newfoundland and Labrador general election
Party	Candidate	Votes	%
Progressive Conservative	Harvey Hodder	3,444	54.365
Liberal	Barrie Heywood	2,858	45.35
Total valid votes		6,302	99.68
Total rejected and declines votes		20	0.32
Turnout		6,322	73.88
Electors on the lists		8,557	

=== Waterford-Kenmount ===
1993 Newfoundland and Labrador general election
Party	Candidate	Votes	%
Progressive Conservative	Harvey Hodder	4,731	51.31
Liberal	Eric Gullage	3,837	41.61
New Democratic	Scott Anderson	653	7.08
Total valid votes		9,221	99.72
Total rejected and declines votes		26	0.28
Turnout		9,247	98.78
Electors on the lists		9,361	

1989 Newfoundland and Labrador general election
Party	Candidate	Votes	%
Liberal	Eric Gullage	3,947	53.06
Progressive Conservative	Ralph Tucker	3,188	42.86
New Democratic	Wayne James	304	4.09
Total valid votes		7,439	99.85
Total rejected and declines votes		11	0.15
Turnout		7,450	79.59
Electors on the lists		9,361	

Newfoundland and Labrador provincial by-election, 9 March 1988 Appointment of Gerry Ottenheimer to the Senate
Party	Candidate	Votes	%
Liberal	Eric Gullage	2,311	41.45
Progressive Conservative	E. Ralph Tucker	2,111	37.86
New Democratic	Cle Newhook	1,154	20.70
Total valid votes		5,576	99.86
Total rejected and declines votes		8	0.14
Turnout		5,584	69.03
Electors on the lists		8,089	

1985 Newfoundland and Labrador general election
Party	Candidate	Votes	%
Progressive Conservative	Gerry Ottenheimer	3,251	56.98
Liberal	Eric Adams	1,401	24.55
New Democratic	Wallace Day	1,054	18.47
Total valid votes		5,706	99.84
Total rejected and declines votes		9	0.16
Turnout		5,715	70.65
Electors on the lists		8,089	

== See also ==
- List of Newfoundland and Labrador provincial electoral districts
- Canadian provincial electoral districts
