= Gordon Dawe =

Canadian politician

Gordon William Dawe (May 17, 1938 – February 8, 2011) was a land surveyor and politician in Newfoundland. He represented Harbour Main in the Newfoundland House of Assembly from 1971 to 1975.

The son of William Gordon Dawe and Eliza Ann Smith, he was born in St. John's. In 1959, Dawe married Ena Francis.

He ran unsuccessfully for a seat in the Newfoundland assembly in 1966 before being elected in 1971. Dawe served in the provincial cabinet as Minister of Supply and Services, Minister of Manpower and Industrial Relations and Minister of Provincial Affairs and Environment.

He died in St. John's in 2011.
