= Clifton J. Joy =

Canadian doctor and politician

Doctor Clifton Joseph Joy (December 8, 1922 – April 29, 1994) was a physician and politician in Newfoundland. He represented Harbour Main in the Newfoundland House of Assembly from 1962 to 1966.

Joy was born in Port au Port, the son of Elizabeth (Dubourdieu) and John Lawrence Joy, and was educated there, at Saint Bonaventure's College, at St. Francis Xavier University, at Dalhousie University, at McGill University and at Harvard University. Joy practised medicine in St. George's from 1949 to 1951 and then pursued post-graduate studies. From 1954 to 1966, he was a pediatrician in St. John's.

Joy married Flora Louise Pike; the couple had four children. His son Robert became an actor. His son John was a lawyer and later provincial court judge in Labrador.

He was elected to the Newfoundland assembly in 1962. During his time in the assembly, he was a part-time consultant for the Newfoundland Department of Health. From 1966 to 1972, he was on the staff of the Janeway Child Health Centre and was acting chief of staff from 1966 to 1968. Starting in 1972, Joy practised pediatrics in Niagara Falls for several years; he returned to St. John's in 1979.
