= 2005 Newfoundland and Labrador municipal elections =

Local elections in Canada

← 2001	September 27, 2005	2009 →

The Canadian province of Newfoundland and Labrador held municipal elections in its municipalities on September 27, 2005.

Listed are the results of selected municipal mayoral races in the province.

== Conception Bay South ==
Candidate	Vote	%
Woodrow French	2,244	38.5
Ken McDonald	1,392	23.9
Marie Deacy	1,067	18.3
Sandra Baggs	1,060	18.2
Michael Jennings	63	1.1

== Corner Brook ==
Candidate	Vote	%
Charles Pender	2,427	33.8
Neville Greeley	2,002	27.8
Priscilla Boutcher (inc.)	1,935	26.9
Jeff Sheaves	827	11.5

== Gander ==
Candidate	Vote	%
Claude Elliott (inc.)	1918	53.0
Larry Dawson	1698	47.0

== Grand Falls-Windsor ==
Candidate	Vote	%
Rex Barnes	3,242	57.2
Mike Griffin	1,821	32.2
Aubrey Smith	600	10.6

== Happy Valley-Goose Bay ==
Candidate	Vote	%
Leo Abbass (inc.)	ACC.	

== Labrador City ==
Candidate	Vote	%
Graham Letto (inc.)	ELEC.	

== Mount Pearl ==
Candidate	Vote	%
Steve Kent (inc.)	ACC.	

== Paradise ==
Candidate	Vote	%
Ralph Wiseman	2,128	59.9
Keith Sheppard	1,426	40.1

== St. John's ==
=== Mayoral ===
Candidate	Vote	%
Andy Wells (inc.)	25,136	86.0
Ray O'Neill	4,108	14.0

=== Deputy Mayoral ===
Candidate	Vote	%
Dennis O'Keefe	25,689	73.6
Fred Windsor	9,223	26.4

=== Council ===
Elected	Ward
Gerry Colbert	At large
Shannie Duff (inc.)	At large
Tom Hann	At large
Sandy Hickman (inc.)	At large
Art Puddister (inc.)	Ward 1
Frank Galgay (inc.)	Ward 2
Keith Coombs (inc.)	Ward 3
Debbie Hanlon (2008-2009)	Ward 4
Ron Ellsworth (2005-2008)	Ward 4
Wally Collins	Ward 5

== Stephenville ==
Election postponed for a week due to flooding

Candidate	Vote	%
Tom O'Brien	ELEC.	
Cec Stein (inc.)		

== By-elections since 2005 ==
=== St. John's Mayoral - 2008 ===
Candidate	Vote	%
Dennis O'Keefe (X)	19,602	58.15%
Marie White	14,109	41.85%

=== St. John's Deputy Mayoral - 2008 ===
Candidate	Vote	%
Ron Ellsworth (X)	19,509	58.65%
Paul Sears	7,558	22.72%
Fred Winsor	6,198	18.63%

=== St. John's Ward 4 - 2008 ===
Candidate	Vote	%
Debbie Hanlon	3,479	47.37%
Bernard Davis	2,861	38.96%
Sam Kelly	1,004	13.67%

== See also ==
- Municipal elections in Canada
- VOCM news
