= William Ellis (Newfoundland politician) =

Newfoundland politician (1857–1926)

The Honourable William Ellis MHA MLC
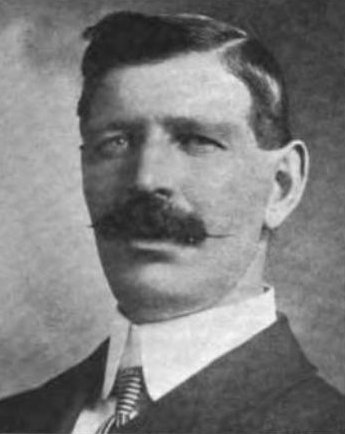

Minister without portfolio
- In office 1918 – April 17, 1926
- Prime Minister: William F. Lloyd; Michael Cashin; Richard Squires; William Warren; Walter Monroe

Member of the Legislative Council of Newfoundland
- In office 1917 – April 17, 1926
- Appointed by: Edward Morris

3rd Mayor of St. John's, Newfoundland
- In office June 27, 1910 – July 1, 1914
- Preceded by: Michael Gibbs
- Succeeded by: William Gosling (post-municipal commission)

Member of the Newfoundland House of Assembly for Ferryland
- In office October 31, 1904 – May 8, 1909 Serving with Michael Cashin
- Preceded by: James D. Ryan
- Succeeded by: Philip F. Moore

St. John's City Councillor
- In office June 19, 1902 – June 27, 1910

Personal details
- Born: William James Ellis; July 9, 1857 St. John's, Newfoundland Colony
- Died: April 17, 1926 (aged 68) New York City, New York, U.S.
- Party: Liberal
- Occupation: Contractor

William James Ellis (July 9, 1857 – April 17, 1926) was a building contractor and political figure in Newfoundland. He represented Ferryland in the Newfoundland and Labrador House of Assembly from 1904 to 1909 as a Liberal. Ellis was the third mayor of St. John's from 1910 to 1914.

== Biography ==
He was born in St. John's and apprenticed as a stonemason with his father. Ellis later established his own contracting and construction business and also operated a quarry. His company rebuilt a number of buildings in St. John's following the Great Fire of 1892. He served as a member of the city council for St. John's from 1902 to 1910. He was defeated when he ran for reelection to the Newfoundland assembly in 1909 and 1913. Ellis was named to the Legislative Council in 1917 and served until 1926; he served as a minister without portfolio in the Executive Council from 1918 to 1926. He died in New York City at the age of 68 while returning from a winter holiday in California.
