= Michael Gibbs =

Michael Gibbs may refer to:

- Michael Gibbs (politician) (1870–1943), Newfoundland lawyer and politician
- Michael Gibbs (composer) (born 1937), jazz composer and arranger
- Michael Gibbs (priest) (1900–1962), Dean of Cape Town and Dean of Chester
- Michael Gibbs (poet) (1949–2009), British poet and visual artist
