= 2009 Newfoundland and Labrador municipal elections =

Local elections in Canada

← 2005	September 29, 2009	2013 →

The Canadian province of Newfoundland and Labrador held municipal elections in its municipalities on September 29, 2009.

Listed are the results of selected municipal mayoral races in the province.

== Bay Roberts ==
Candidate	Vote	%
Glen Littlejohn (X)	Acclaimed	

== Clarenville ==
Candidate	Vote	%
Fred Best (X)	1,224	51.41
Lisa Browne	1,157	48.59

== Conception Bay South ==
=== Mayoral ===
Candidate	Vote	%
Woodrow French (X)	Acclaimed	

=== City council ===
Candidate	Vote	%
Ward 1
Paul Davis (X)	Acclaimed	
Ward 2
Stephen Tessier	319	51.12
Gerald Dawe (X)	305	48.88
Ward 3
Ken McDonald	528	50.97
Gerard Tilley (X)	508	49.03
Ward 4
Kirk Youden (X)	521	58.61
Ernest Morgan	368	41.39
At large (4 to be elected)
John Hicks (X)	1,854	17.16
Ken George (X)	1,821	16.85
Beverley Rowe (X)	1,809	16.74
Sandra Baggs	1,541	14.26
Marie Deacy	1,496	13.85
John French	1,410	13.05
Connie Scott	873	8.08

== Corner Brook ==
=== Mayoral ===
Candidate	Vote	%
Neville Greeley	3,120	51.36
Charles Pender (X)	2,955	48.64

=== City Council ===
(6 to be elected)

Candidate	Vote	%
Donna Luther (X)	4,039	13.32
Leo Bruce (X)	3,716	12.25
Charlie Renouf (X)	3,223	10.63
Priscilla Boutcher	3,106	10.24
Donna Francis	2,777	9.16
Linda Chaisson	2,419	7.98
Tarragh Shanahan	2,172	7.16
Paul Quigley	2,154	7.10
Dennis Basha	1,690	5.57
Dan Park	1,537	5.07
Tom Stewart	1,404	4.63
Jerry Gregory	1,168	3.85
Julie Crouse	924	3.05

=== City Council By-Election 2011 ===
(To replace the seat vacated by Charlie Renouf)

Candidate	Vote	%
Gary Kelly	987	34.61
June Alteen	656	23.00
Trent Quinton	530	18.58
Alton Whalen	471	16.51
Tarragh Shanahan	208	7.30

== Daniel's Harbour ==
=== Mayoral ===
Candidate
Stephen Carey
Ross Humber (Elec.)

=== Elected City Council ===
Elected Council
Jim Bennett
Leslie Brophy
Daniel House
Harvey House Jr.
Roger House
Shawn Perry

== Gander ==
Candidate	Vote	%
Claude Elliott (X)	Acclaimed	

== Grand Falls-Windsor ==
Candidate	Vote	%
Al Hawkins	1,991	36.10
Beve Butler	1,488	26.98
Jim Courtney	1,381	25.04
Don Pelley	655	11.88

== Happy Valley-Goose Bay ==
=== Mayoral ===
Candidate	Vote	%
Leo Abbass (X)	Acclaimed	

=== City Council ===
Candidate	Vote	%
Stanley Oliver (X)	930	
George Andrews (X)	893	
Arlene Michelin (X)	862	
Bill MacKey (X)	841	
Brenda Way (X)	822	
Lidija Chubbs (X)	720	
Jennifer Hefler-Elson	589	
Joe Tremblett	584	
Shannon Tobin	581	
Carl Cull	554	
Carson Swain	529	
Madelyn Kelly	509	
Paul Tsibidis	472	
Jackie Compton Hobbs	450	
James Saunders	364	
Dion O'Dell	343	
Craig Paul Saunders	272	
Hubert Loder	240	
Leo Hanrahan	210	

== Labrador City ==
Candidate	Vote	%
Janice Barnes	Acclaimed	

== Marystown ==
Candidate	Vote	%
Sam Synard (X)	Acclaimed	

== Mount Pearl ==
=== Mayoral ===
Candidate	Vote	%
Randy Simms (X)	Acclaimed	

=== City council ===
(6 to be elected)

Candidate	Vote	%
Jim Locke (X)	4,265	16.59
Paul Lane (X)	4,205	16.35
Paula Tessier (X)	4,051	15.75
Lucy Stoyles (X)	3,936	15.31
John Walsh (X)	3,635	14.14
Dave Aker	2,966	11.54
Rose Clarke	2,655	10.33

== Paradise ==
- A subsequent recount (exact tally unknown) showed both candidates tied. Pursuant to the province's Municipal Elections Act, this resulted in a random draw, which resulted in Wiseman being chosen as the winner. However, Coombs made a request for a judicial recount. The judicial recount confirmed that it was indeed a tie; this led the first random draw to stand and Ralph Wiseman to stay Mayor.

Initial count:

Candidate	Vote	%
Ralph Wiseman (X)	1,821	50.00
Kurtis Coombs	1,821	50.00

== Pasadena ==
Candidate	Vote	%
Gary Bishop	903	65.06
Jan Stephen	485	34.94

== Portugal Cove-St. Philip's ==
Candidate	Vote	%
Bill Fagan	1,052	40.03
Norm Collins (X)	1,042	39.65
Stephen Andrews	534	20.32

== St. John's ==
=== Mayoral ===
Candidate	Vote	%
Dennis O'Keefe (X)	20,944	57.44
Ron Ellsworth	13,427	36.73
Mark Wilson	2,130	5.83

=== Deputy Mayor ===
Candidate	Vote	%
Shannie Duff	19,091	54.22
Keith Coombs	16,117	45.78

=== City Council ===
Candidate	Vote	%
Ward 1
Danny Breen	3,402	41.09
Art Puddister (X)	3,184	38.46
Dave Lee	1,693	20.45
Ward 2
Frank Galgay (X)	3,652	56.37
Scott Fitzgerald	1,465	22.61
Andrew Harvey	511	7.89
Bill Maddigan	477	7.36
Todd Perrin	374	5.77
Ward 3
Bruce Tilley	3,635	52.07
Terry Bennett	1,866	26.73
Lionel West	744	10.66
Ted Warren	736	10.54
Ward 4
Debbie Hanlon (X)	4,268	61.38
Sheilagh Guy-Murphy	2,685	38.62
Ward 5
Wally Collins (X)	2,565	37.29
Steve Manuel	1,686	24.51
David Ryan	1,384	20.12
Perry Howlett	1,243	18.07
At large (4 to be elected)
Sheilagh O'Leary	24,056	19.82
Sandy Hickman (X)	17,562	14.47
Tom Hann (X)	17,079	14.07
Gerry Colbert (X)	16,183	13.34
Bernard Davis	15,078	12.43
Simon Lono	14,705	12.12
Tom Badcock	8,650	7.13
Barry Buckle	4,352	3.59
Stephen Nolan	3,684	3.04

== Stephenville ==
Candidate	Vote	%
Tom O'Brien (X)	1,188	57.20
Tom Rose	889	42.80

== Torbay ==
Candidate	Vote	%
Bob Codner (X)	1,300	56.67
Mary Thorne-Gosee	994	43.33
