= List of mayors of St. John's, Newfoundland and Labrador =

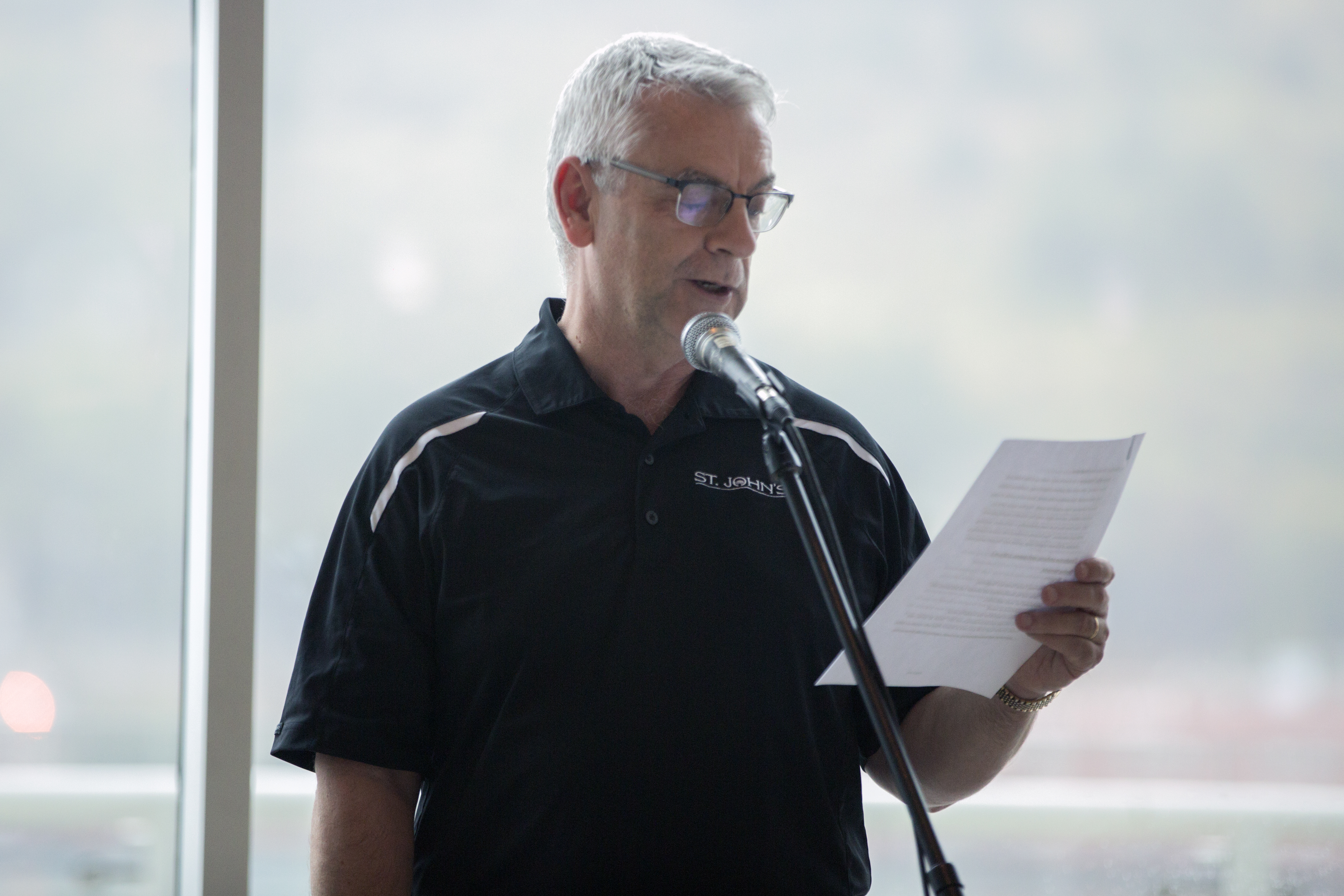
Danny Breen, current mayor of St. John's since 2017

This is a list of mayors of St. John's, Newfoundland and Labrador.

Between 1888–1898, the St. John's City Council consisted of five councillors elected by wards and two members who were appointed by the Newfoundland government. The city was governed by a commission of government from 1898–1902. A municipal council was recreated that would be formed by six councillors-at-large and one mayor who would be elected by those citizens of St. John's who pay property taxes. Except for another period of government by commission from 1914–1916, this system has since governed the city of St. John's.

The city council currently comprises 11 members: the Mayor, the Deputy Mayor and nine councillors, five which represent wards throughout the city and four that are elected at large.

== Mayors ==
Mayors of St. John's, Newfoundland and Labrador
No.	Portrait	Mayor	Term began	Term ended
1		George Shea	June 19, 1902	June 26, 1906
2		Michael Gibbs	June 26, 1906	June 27, 1910
3		William Ellis	June 27, 1910	July 1, 1914
Municipal Commission of Government (July 1, 1914 – June 29, 1916)
4		William Gosling	June 29, 1916	December 15, 1921
5		Tasker Cook	December 15, 1921	December 9, 1929
6		Charles Howlett	December 9, 1929	March 31, 1932
7		Andrew Carnell	March 31, 1932	November 8, 1949
8		Harry Mews	November 8, 1949	November 16, 1965
9		William G. Adams	November 16, 1965	November 13, 1973
10		Dorothy Wyatt	November 13, 1973	November 3, 1981
11 (1)		John J. Murphy	November 3, 1981	November 13, 1990
12		Shannie Duff	November 13, 1990	November 9, 1993
11 (2)		John J. Murphy	November 9, 1993	September 30, 1997
13		Andy Wells	September 30, 1997	March 3, 2008
–		Dennis O'Keefe (Acting)	March 3, 2008	April 22, 2008
–		Shannie Duff (Acting)	April 22, 2008	June 9, 2008
14		Dennis O'Keefe	June 9, 2008	September 26, 2017
15		Danny Breen	September 26, 2017	Incumbent

== Deputy Mayors ==
Deputy mayors of St. John's, Newfoundland and Labrador
No.	Mayor	Term began	Term ended
1	James T. Martin	December 15, 1921	December 8, 1925
2	Joseph Fitzgibbon	December 8, 1925	December 9, 1929
3	Andrew Carnell	December 9, 1929	March 31, 1932
4	James Chalker	December 1933	December 15, 1941
5	Eric Cook	December 15, 1941	1943
6	James Spratt	November 13, 1945	November 9, 1949
7	George Nightingale	November 8, 1949	November 10, 1953
8	James D. Higgins	November 10, 1953	November 14, 1961
9	William G. Adams	November 14, 1961	November 16, 1965
10	John Crosbie	November 16, 1965	July 1966
11	Len Stirling	November 18, 1969	November 13, 1973
12	John J. Murphy	November 13, 1973	November 8, 1977
13	Ray O'Neill	November 8, 1977	November 3, 1981
14 (1)	Shannie Duff	November 3, 1981	November 13, 1990
15	Andy Wells	November 13, 1990	September 30, 1997
16	Marie White	September 30, 1997	September 25, 2001
17	Gerry Colbert	September 25, 2001	September 27, 2005
18	Dennis O'Keefe	September 27, 2005	March 3, 2008
19 (1)	Ron Ellsworth	June 3, 2008	September 29, 2009
14 (2)	Shannie Duff	September 29, 2009	September 24, 2013
19 (2)	Ron Ellsworth	September 24, 2013	September 26, 2017
20	Sheilagh O'Leary	September 26, 2017	October 8, 2025
19 (3)	Ron Ellsworth	October 8, 2025	Incumbent
