= John B. Ayre =

Newfoundland politician (1850–1915)

John B. Ayre MLC MHA

Member of the Legislative Council of Newfoundland
- In office 1898 – April 20, 1915
- Appointed by: Robert Bond

Member of the Newfoundland House of Assembly for Bay de Verde
- In office May 22, 1894 – October 28, 1897 Serving with Sydney Woods (1894–1895); Henry J. B. Woods (1895–1897)
- Preceded by: George Moores; Henry J. B. Woods
- Succeeded by: Abram Kean; William Rogerson

Personal details
- Born: John Bray Ayre; June 18, 1850 St. John's, Newfoundland Colony
- Died: April 20, 1915 (aged 64) St. John's, Newfoundland
- Party: Conservative
- Relatives: Charles R. Ayre (father); John E. Peters (brother-in-law)
- Occupation: Businessman

John Bray Ayre (June 18, 1850 – April 20, 1915) was a merchant and political figure in Newfoundland. He represented Bay de Verde in the Newfoundland and Labrador House of Assembly from 1894 to 1897.

He was born in St. John's, the son of Charles R. Ayre. He served as a director in the family firm. Ayre was a member of the Legislative Council of Newfoundland from 1898 to 1915. He died in St. John's at the age of 64.
