= John Harris (Newfoundland politician) =

Newfoundland politician (1860–1915)

The Honourable John Harris MLC
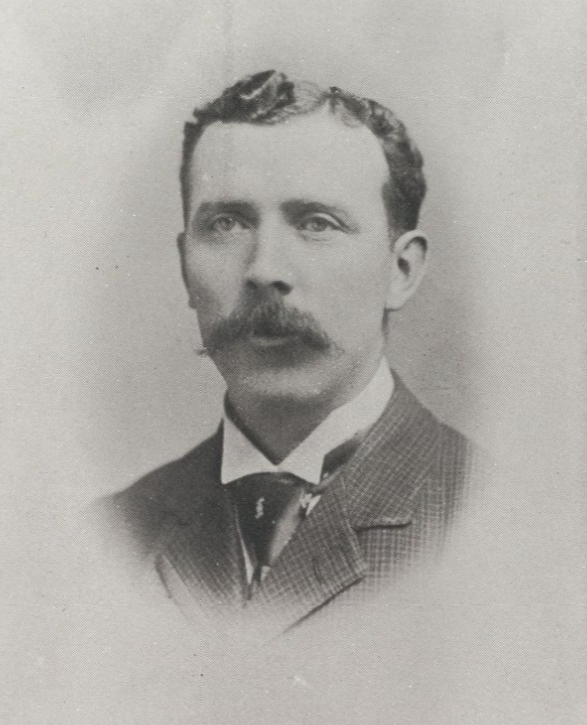
- Harris in 1894

4th President of the Legislative Council of Newfoundland
- In office February 14, 1912 – June 5, 1915
- Prime Minister: Sir Edward Morris
- Governor: Sir Ralph Williams; Sir Walter Edward Davidson
- Preceded by: Edward Dalton Shea
- Succeeded by: Patrick T. McGrath

Member of the Legislative Council of Newfoundland
- In office 1892 – December 31, 1915
- Appointed by: William Whiteway

St. John's City Councillor Ward 1 (1894–1898)
- In office July 1, 1914 – December 31, 1915
- Appointed by: Edward Morris
- In office 1894 – June 19, 1902
- Preceded by: John T. Carnell
- Succeeded by: Ward abolished
- In office 1890–1892
- Preceded by: James P. Fox
- Succeeded by: Edward W. Bennett; Thomas Mitchell

Personal details
- Born: 1860 St. John's, Newfoundland Colony
- Died: December 31, 1915 (aged 55) St. John’s, Newfoundland
- Party: Liberal
- Spouse: Mary Jardine (m. 1900–1906)
- Education: St. Bonaventure's College
- Occupation: Merchant

John Harris (1860 – December 31, 1915) was a Newfoundland merchant and politician who was the President of the Legislative Council from 1912 until his death. Prior to his appointment to the upper house, he served the St. John's City Council for several terms. He was also a member of the government-appointed commission which governed St. John's in 1914.

== Early life and mercantile career ==
Harris was born in St. John's in 1860 as the son of William Harris, a carpenter and contractor. He was raised in Harris Cottage in Georgestown which had been built by his family. Harris graduated from St. Bonaventure's College in 1875 and became a clerk for James Gleeson's hardware store. Harris soon went to the mercantile firm Hearn and Company, and after working there as a book keeper for a few years, he became a partner in 1880. Following the 1894 Newfoundland bank crash, he became the director of the Colonial Savings Bank, and he also served as the vice president of the Newfoundland Board of Trade. In community life, Harris was involved with the Catholic Cadet Corps.

== Municipal and legislative politics ==
In 1890, the recently elected William Whiteway administration nominated Harris to serve as one of the two government appointed members of the nascent St. John's City Council. Rather than seek another appointment following the 1892 municipal election, Whiteway appointed Harris to the Legislative Council, the upper house of the Newfoundland Colony. At that time, he was the youngest member to have ever been appointed to that legislative body. Harris later returned to the St. John's City Council while serving in the upper house.

Harris became the president of the Legislative Council in 1912 following the retirement of his longtime predecessor Edward Dalton Shea. By this time, he had become one of the body's senior members, and although his accession to the presidency had been anticipated by its membership, he had to turn down the presidency of the Board of Trade in order to accept the leadership position in the upper house. He would later be appointed by the Edward Morris administration to the city of St. John's' commission of government in 1914. Harris died unexpectedly in St. John's.
