= Gene Long =

Canadian politician (born 1957)

Gene Long MHA

Member of the Newfoundland House of Assembly for St. John's East
- In office December 9, 1986 – April 20, 1989
- Preceded by: William Marshall
- Succeeded by: Shannie Duff

Personal details
- Born: 1957 (age 68–69) Gander, Newfoundland, Canada
- Party: New Democratic
- Education: University of British Columbia (B.A.); Memorial University of Newfoundland (M.A.)

Eugene Long (born 1957) is a Canadian former politician from Newfoundland and Labrador. He was the member of the House of Assembly (MHA) for St. John's East from 1986 to 1989.

== Early life and politics ==
Long was born in Gander as the son of Robert Long and Rose (née James). After graduating from the University of British Columbia, he worked with Oxfam as a development educator.

Long first entered politics when he ran as the New Democratic Party candidate for the district of St. John's East in the 1985 provincial election, which he lost to incumbent Progressive Conservative (PC) MHA William Marshall. When Marshall was appointed to the Supreme Court of Newfoundland the following year, Long won the by-election to succeed him. member of the House of Assembly for the riding of St. John's East. He then ran for the New Democratic party leadership race in March 1989, but he was defeated by Cle Newhook by a margin of 21 votes. Long lost his seat in the provincial election a month later.

== Post-political career ==
Long moved to Toronto in the 1990s. He was a senior policy advisor in the Government of Ontario and later the communications manager at the Ontario Ombudsman's office. He worked as the communications manager at the public health department of the City of Toronto, and then as senior policy advisor at Toronto Public Health.

He is also the published author of a political history of Newfoundland. He has a Master of Arts degree from Memorial University of Newfoundland.

In 2026, Long endorsed Avi Lewis in that year's federal NDP leadership race.

== Electoral history ==
1989 Newfoundland general election: St. John's East
Party	Candidate	Votes	%	±%
Progressive Conservative	Shannie Duff	2,397	41.72	▲6.72
New Democratic	Gene Long	2,137	37.19	▼4.59
Liberal	Lynette Billard	1,212	21.09	▼2.13
Total valid votes		5,746	99.79	
Total rejected ballots		12	0.21	
Total votes		5,758	83.00	▲29.15
Eligible voters		6,937		
Progressive Conservative gain		Swing		

St. John's East provincial by-election, December 9, 1986
Party	Candidate	Votes	%	±%
New Democratic	Gene Long	1,693	41.78	▲5.48
Progressive Conservative	Shannie Duff	1,418	35.00	▼15.18
Liberal	Rex Murphy	941	23.22	▲9.70
Total valid votes		4,052	99.66	
Total rejected ballots		14	0.34	
Total votes		4,066	53.85	▼18.94
Eligible voters		7,524		
New Democratic gain		Swing		

1985 Newfoundland general election: St. John's East
Party	Candidate	Votes	%	±%
Progressive Conservative	William Marshall	2,738	50.18	▼18.35
New Democratic	Gene Long	1,981	36.30	▲17.78
Liberal	Hugh Shea	738	13.52	▲0.57
Total valid votes		5,457	99.63	
Total rejected ballots		20	0.37	
Total votes		5,477	72.79	▲9.70
Eligible voters		7,524		
Progressive Conservative hold		Swing		

== Publications ==
- Long, Gene. Suspended state : Newfoundland before Canada / Gene Long. St. John's, Nfld. : Breakwater Books, 1999. 218 p.; 21 cm. ISBN 1-55081-144-4
- Long, Gene. William Coaker and the loss of faith: toward and beyond consensus in the suspension of Newfoundland's self-government, 1925-1933 Thesis (M.A.)--Memorial University of Newfoundland, 1992. University Microfilms order no. UMI00427744.
