= Dorothy Wyatt =

Canadian politician (1925–2001)

10th Mayor of St. John's, Newfoundland
- In office November 13, 1973 – November 3, 1981
- Deputy: John Joseph Murphy (1973–1977); Ray O'Neill (1977–1981)
- Preceded by: William G. Adams
- Succeeded by: John Joseph Murphy

St. John's City Councillor At-large (1985–2001)
- In office November 12, 1985 – September 23, 2001
- In office November 18, 1969 – November 3, 1981

Personal details
- Born: Dorothy Mary Fanning; December 17, 1925 St. John's, Newfoundland
- Died: September 23, 2001 (aged 75) St. John's, Newfoundland, Canada
- Party: Progressive Conservative
- Spouse: Donald Wyatt
- Education: Memorial University
- Occupation: Nurse

Dorothy Mary Wyatt (née Fanning; December 17, 1925 – September 23, 2001) was a Canadian politician who was mayor of St. John's, Newfoundland from 1973 to 1981 and the city's first female mayor.

== Biography ==
Wyatt first worked as a secretary, meeting her husband Donald Wyatt while working for American Overseas Airlines in Gander. She later returned to Memorial University of Newfoundland to study nursing.

Wyatt first won election to St. John's City Council in 1969 as the city's first female councilor. She ran for the mayoralty in 1973, winning the election and serving two terms in office. Her term as mayor was marked by accomplishments including the city's hosting of the Canada Summer Games in 1977, a shift from rental-value to capital-value municipal tax assessment, the adoption of a ward system for city council elections, and the construction of many of the city's modern office buildings.

Wyatt was defeated by John Joseph Murphy in the 1981 election. She was later reelected as a councillor at large in 1985, and remained a sitting member of city council until her death; she died just two days before the city's 2001 municipal election, and was posthumously reelected to her seat on September 25. A by-election was held on November 27 of that year, and was won by Sandy Hickman.

She was a candidate for provincial office twice, running as an independent candidate in St. John's Centre and later for the leadership of the Progressive Conservative Party of Newfoundland and Labrador in the party's 1979 leadership convention. In the PC race, she garnered no votes. She didn't vote for herself, admitting that she had run more "to shake things up" than out of a serious desire to actually lead the party, and was eliminated on the first ballot.

== Public image ==
Wyatt revelled in a quirky and offbeat public image, once telling a reporter that she hoped to be classified "as a freak, I suppose".
