= Harry Mews =

Canadian politician (1897–1982)

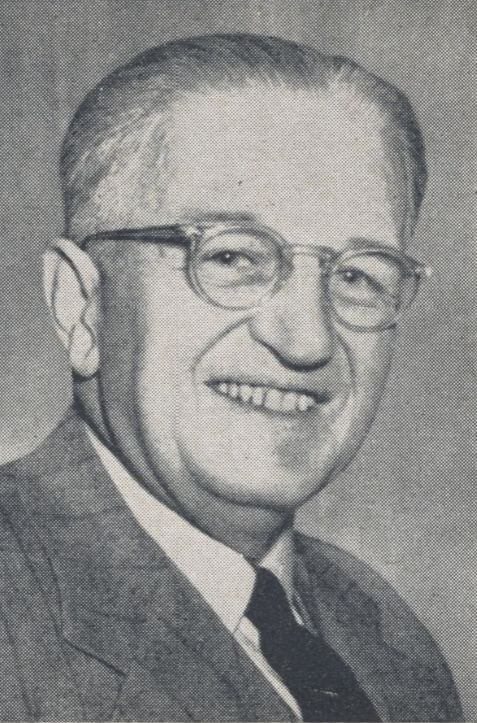
- Mews in 1952

8th Mayor of St. John's, Newfoundland
- In office November 8, 1949 – November 16, 1965
- Deputy: George Nightingale (1949–1953); James D. Higgins (1953–1961); William G. Adams (1961–1965)
- Preceded by: Andrew Carnell
- Succeeded by: William G. Adams
- Leader of the Progressive Conservative Party of Newfoundland
- In office April 8, 1949 – November 8, 1949
- Preceded by: Party established
- Succeeded by: John Higgins

Councillor-at-Large for St. John's
- In office 1943–1949

Personal details
- Born: Henry George Reginald Mews; December 18, 1897 St. John's, Newfoundland Colony
- Died: January 6, 1982 (aged 84)
- Party: Progressive Conservative
- Spouse(s): Vera Sparling (m. 1926–1957) Mary Summers (m. 1958)
- Children: 2
- Relatives: Henry J. B. Woods (maternal grandfather)
- Military service
- Branch: Royal Newfoundland Regiment
- Service years: 1917–1919
- Rank: Lieutenant

Henry George Reginald Mews (December 18, 1897 – January 6, 1982) was a Canadian politician from Newfoundland. He was the eighth mayor of the city of St. John's.

== Background ==
Mews was born in St. John's on December 18, 1897. He was the son of Arthur Mews, a civil servant, and Mabel Woods, the daughter of Henry J. B. Woods, who served in the colonial cabinet and was postmaster general from 1902 to 1914. Mews was educated at the Methodist College in St. John's and served as a lieutenant with the Newfoundland Regiment during World War I. After his return, he worked with the Goodyear Tire and Rubber Company in Ontario. Mews contracted tuberculosis and was treated in New York. He recovered and married Vera Sparling in Montreal in 1926. Soon afterwards, he returned to St. John's and worked as a secretary in the Board of Trade. In 1936, he became an insurance company manager with The North American Life Assurance Company.

== City councillor and political leader ==
Mews was first elected to St. John's City Council as an alderman in 1943 and was mayor from 1949 to 1965. He served as leader of the Progressive Conservative Party when the dominion joined Canadian Confederation in 1949 and led the party in the 1949 provincial election in May losing to Joey Smallwood's Liberals and failing to win a seat in the Newfoundland House of Assembly. He was elected mayor for the first time on November 8, 1949, and stepped down as provincial party leader soon after.

== Mayor of St. John's (1949–1965) ==
During Mews' tenure as mayor, the city undertook a slum clearance program in its downtown and built public housing in various parts of the city. He also oversaw the creation of a large suburban development in the northeast of St. John's. In 1957, council created the St. John's Transportation Commission, taking over the city's privately owned bus system. During his term as mayor, the city had accumulated a substantial fund which was used for the construction of a new city hall in 1969.
