= 2017 Newfoundland and Labrador municipal elections =

Local elections in Canada

- September 26, 2017

Municipal elections were held in the Canadian province of Newfoundland and Labrador on September 26, 2017. This article lists the results in selected municipalities. Results are for mayoral elections unless otherwise specified.

== Bay Roberts ==
Mayoral Candidate	Vote	%
Philip Wood (X)	1,580	59.57
George Simmons	1,073	40.44

== Clarenville ==
Mayoral Candidate	Vote	%
Frazer Russell (X)	Acclaimed	

== Conception Bay South ==
Mayoral Candidate	Vote	%
Terry French	Acclaimed	

== Corner Brook ==
=== Mayor ===
Mayoral Candidate	Vote	%
Jim Parsons	3,775	56.18
Charles Pender (X)	2,945	43.82

=== City council ===
Candidate	Vote	%
Bill Griffin	2,933	8.28
Vaughn Granter	2,741	7.74
Linda Chaisson (X)	2,579	7.28
Bernd Staeben (X)	2,564	7.24
Josh Carey (X)	2,514	7.10
Tony Buckle (X)	2,317	6.54
Lenny Benoit	2,268	6.40
Katrina Basha	2,224	6.28
Keith Cormier (X)	2,104	5.94
Pamela Gill	2,024	5.71
Leo Bruce	1,961	5.54
Devon Pardy	1,924	5.43
Brian Sparkes	1,885	5.32
Donna Wheeler	1,616	4.56
Priscilla Boutcher	1,283	3.62
Tom Stewart	1,078	3.04
Kyle Brookings	857	2.42
Maureen Mennie	543	1.53

== Deer Lake ==
Mayoral Candidate	Vote	%
Dean Ball (X)	1,293	61.02
Sandra Pinksen	826	38.98

== Gander ==
Mayoral Candidate	Vote	%
Percy Farwell	2,000	54.38
Cyril Abbott	1,557	42.33
Frank Ireland	121	3.29

== Grand Falls-Windsor ==
Mayoral Candidate	Vote	%
Barry Manuel (X)	4,358	76.79
Peggy Bartlett	1,317	23.21

== Happy Valley-Goose Bay ==
Mayoral Candidate	Vote	%
John Hickey	1,393	56.90
George Andrews	565	23.08
Tony Chubbs	490	20.02

== Labrador City ==
Council voted in 2017 to not hold a separate election for mayor. The council candidate who wins the most votes is elected mayor.

Council Candidate (7 to be elected)	Vote	%
Wayne Button (elected mayor)	1,186	10.22
Fabian Benoit	1,030	8.87
Junior Humphries (X)	998	8.60
Nick McGrath	920	7.92
John Penney (X)	883	7.61
Kenneth Lawlor	863	7.43
Richard Fahey	783	6.74
Peter Pike	758	6.53
Edward Conway (X)	744	6.41
Corinna Wentzell	684	5.89
Jamie-Lynn Patterson	655	5.64
Toby Leon	629	5.42
Clarence Rogers (X)	584	5.03
Jordan Brown	515	3.44
Christopher Lacey (X)	377	3.25

== Marystown ==
Mayoral Candidate	Vote	%
Sam Synard (X)	1,907	69.62
Lisa Slaney	832	30.38

== Mount Pearl ==
=== Mayor ===
Candidate	Vote	%
Dave Aker	5,345	81.27
Travis Faulkner	1,232	18.73

=== City Council ===
Candidate	Vote	%
Jim Locke (X)	4,812	14.55
Lucy Stoyles (X)	4,331	13.09
Andrew Ledwell (X)	4,298	12.99
Isabelle Fry	3,429	10.37
Andrea Power	2,994	9.05
Bill Antle	2,844	8.60
Gerard Curtis	1,981	5.99
Max Harvey	1,793	5.42
Terry Ryan	1,697	5.13
Darren Chislett	1,417	4.28
Dave Kelly	1,294	3.91
Rick Pearson	1,211	3.66
Tony Janes	979	2.96

== Paradise ==
=== Mayor ===
Candidate	Vote	%
Dan Bobbett (X)	4,107	78.17
John Roberts	1,147	21.83

=== City Council ===
Candidate	Vote	%
Allan English	2,765	11.20
Elizabeth Laurie (X)	2,554	10.34
Paul Dinn (X)	2,417	9.79
Deborah Quilty (X)	2,128	8.62
Patrick Martin (X)	1,842	7.46
Sterling Willis (X)	1,807	7.32
Coreen Bennett	1,761	7.13
Kimberley Street	1,568	6.35
Scott Dawe	1,533	6.21
Sheldon Antle	1,517	6.14
Glen Carew	1,238	5.01
Neil Farrell	1,162	4.71
Reggie Lawrence	956	3.87
Jamie Thornhill	591	2.40
Tony Kelly	560	2.27
Anthony Pittman	292	1.18

==== By-election, 2019 ====
Candidate	Vote	%
Kimberley Street	788	
Curtis Knee	648	
Coreen Bennett	580	
Tony Kelly	169	

== Portugal Cove-St. Philip's ==
Mayoral Candidate	Vote	%
Carol McDonald	1,282	48.95
Gavin Will	1,045	39.90
Joe Duggan	292	11.15

== St. John's ==
=== Mayor ===
Candidate	Vote	%
Danny Breen	20,261	53.19
Andy Wells	12,604	33.09
Renee Sharpe	5,225	13.72

=== Deputy Mayor ===
Candidate	Vote	%
Sheilagh O'Leary	30,689	84.21
Michelle Worthman	5,753	15.79

=== City Council ===
Candidate	Vote	%
Ward 1
Deanne Stapleton	3,715	45.49
Lou Puddister	3,534	43.27
Nadeem Saqlain	918	11.24
Ward 2
Hope Jamieson	2,989	38.81
Jonathan Galgay (X)	2,674	34.72
Derek Winsor	635	8.24
Tom Badcock	485	6.30
Pamela Hodder	370	4.80
Wayne Ralph	280	3.64
Greg Dunne	269	3.49
Ward 3
Jamie Korab	5,079	63.02
Peter McDonald	1,710	21.22
Walter Harding	1,270	15.76
Ward 4
Ian Froude	3,652	60.77
Scott Fitzgerald	2,358	39.23
Ward 5
Wally Collins (X)	2,286	31.06
Jamie Finn	1,758	23.89
Fraser Piccott	1,350	18.34
Mike Walsh	995	13.52
Paul Dinn	971	13.19
At large (4 to be elected)
Maggie Burton	20,623	15.78
Dave Lane (X)	16,959	12.98
Sandy Hickman (X)	14,273	10.92
Debbie Hanlon	13,632	10.43
Art Puddister (X)	12,772	9.77
Ron Ellsworth	12,335	9.44
Tom Hann (X)	11,765	9.00
Darrell Power	9,992	7.65
Tracy Holmes	5,844	4.47
Jennifer McCreath	5,537	4.24
Terry Bennett	4,682	3.58
Larry Borne	2,253	1.72

==== By-election ====
A by-election was held October 20, 2020 in Ward 2 to fill the vacancy caused by the resignation of Hope Jamieson.

Candidate	Vote	%
Shawn Skinner	1,242	22.88
Ophelia Ravencroft	936	17.24
Lorne Loder	923	17.00
Greg Smith	586	10.79
Carol Anne Furlong	570	10.50
Matt House	480	8.84
Greg Noseworthy	470	8.66
Wallace Ryan	222	4.09

== Stephenville ==
Mayoral Candidate	Vote	%
Tom Rose	1,248	53.56
Tom O'Brien (X)	1,082	46.44

== Torbay ==
Mayoral Candidate	Vote	%
Craig Scott	Acclaimed	
