= Tasker Cook =

Newfoundland politician (1867–1937)

The Honourable Sir Tasker Cook MLC
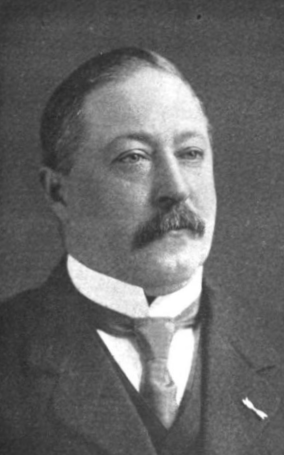
- Cook in 1922

Member of the Legislative Council of Newfoundland
- In office 1927 – February 16, 1934
- Nominated by: Walter Monroe
- Appointed by: William Allardyce
- In office 1917–1921
- Nominated by: Edward Morris
- Appointed by: Charles Harris

5th Mayor of St. John's, Newfoundland
- In office December 15, 1921 – December 9, 1929
- Deputy: James T. Martin (1921–1925); Joseph Fitzgibbon (1925–1929)
- Preceded by: William Gilbert Gosling
- Succeeded by: Charles Howlett

Personal details
- Born: Tasker Keech Cook; June 30, 1867 St. John's, Newfoundland Colony
- Died: September 25, 1937 (aged 70) St. John's, Newfoundland
- Spouse: Henrietta L. Pennock (m. 1891)
- Children: 4
- Education: Church of England Academy

Sir Tasker Keech Cook (June 30, 1867 – September 25, 1937) was a politician in the dominion of Newfoundland, who served as mayor of St. John's from 1921 to 1929.

First elected mayor in 1921, he won a second term by acclamation in 1925. His term in office was marked by various public works projects and by the creation of the city's first planning committee; however, many infrastructure projects in the city remained hamstrung by his reluctance to introduce new municipal taxes.

He was appointed to the Legislative Council of Newfoundland by Prime Minister Richard Squires in 1928, and was a chair of the Newfoundland Railway Commission. He was made a Knight Bachelor by George V in the 1931 New Year Honours, and invested by Edward VIII.

He died in St. John's on September 25, 1937.
