= Shannie Duff =

Canadian politician

Shannie Duff CM ONL
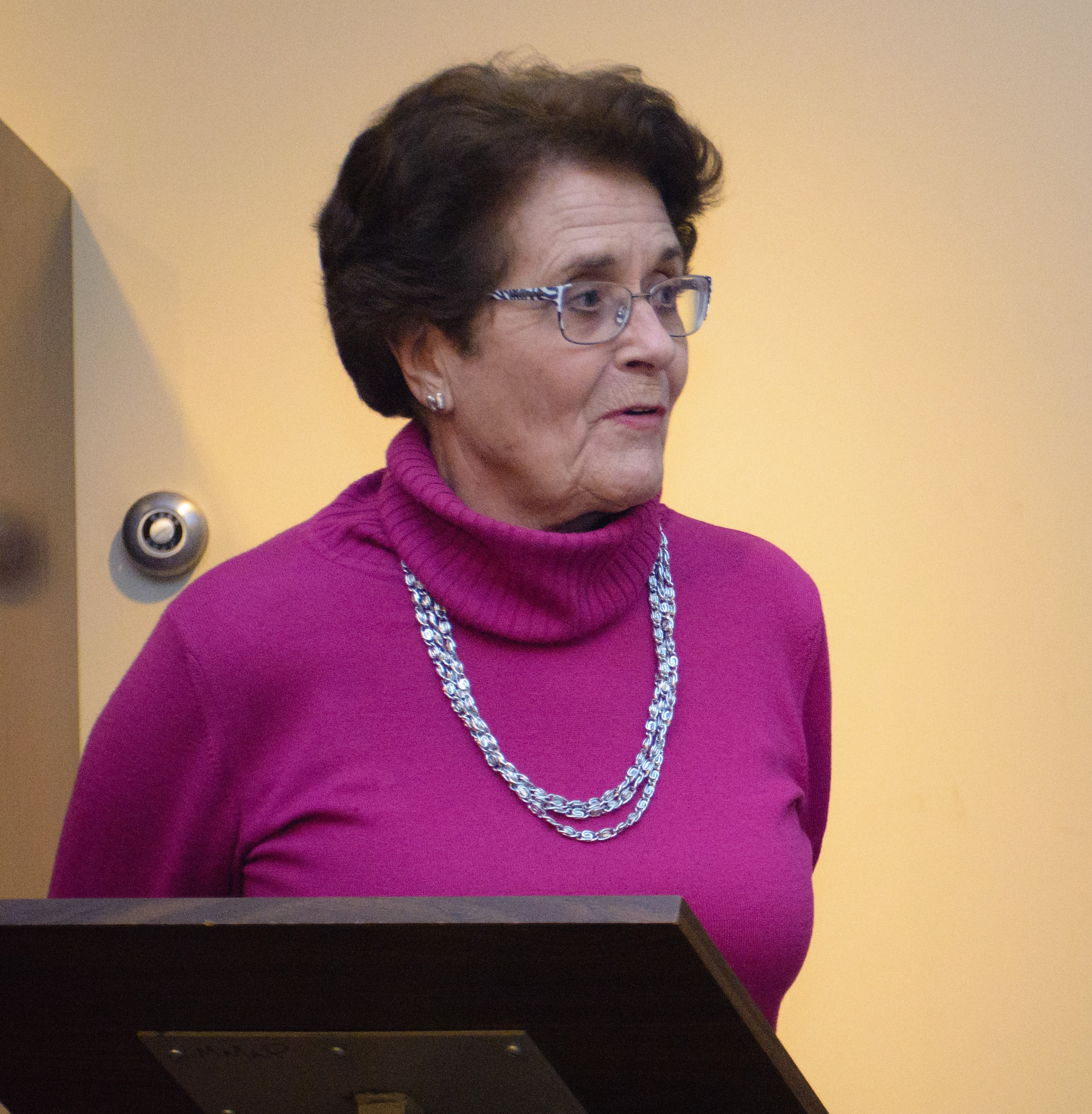
- Duff in 2016

12th Mayor of St. John's
- In office November 1990 – November 1993
- Preceded by: John Joseph Murphy
- Succeeded by: John Joseph Murphy
- Acting
- In office April 22, 2008 – June 9, 2008
- Preceded by: Dennis O'Keefe (acting)
- Succeeded by: Dennis O'Keefe

Deputy Mayor of St. John's
- In office October 2009 – October 2013
- Preceded by: Ron Ellsworth
- Succeeded by: Ron Ellsworth

Councillor-at-Large for St. John's
- In office 1997–2009

MHA for St. John's East
- In office 1989–1990
- Preceded by: Gene Long
- Succeeded by: Jack Harris

Personal details
- Born: Suzanne M. Frecker; August 22, 1936 (age 89)
- Party: Independent
- Other political affiliations: Progressive Conservative
- Spouse: Frank Duff (d. 2024)

Suzanne M. Duff CM ONL (née Frecker; born August 22, 1936) is a Canadian politician who has served as the 12th mayor of St. John's from 1990 to 1993 and as a member of the Newfoundland and Labrador House of Assembly.

== Politics ==
Duff entered municipal politics in 1977 as a member of St. John's City Council. By 1982, she was deputy mayor of the city.

She was elected to the provincial legislature in the 1989 election, representing St. John's East as a member of the Progressive Conservative Party of Newfoundland and Labrador. Unusually, she did not resign her city council seat, but continued to hold both positions with the intention of completing her term on city council, but resigned the provincial seat to run for mayor of St. John's in 1990 after incumbent mayor John Joseph Murphy announced that he would not run for another term.

She won that election and served as mayor until 1993, when Murphy ran for mayor again and defeated Duff. She was then reelected to a city council seat in 1997. She briefly served another stint as acting mayor of the city from April to June 2008 following the resignation of Andy Wells, when councillor Dennis O'Keefe stepped down as acting mayor to run in the mayoral by-election.

Duff was then elected to the office of deputy mayor in the 2009 municipal election. She held this role until 2013, when she announced her retirement from politics. Upon her announcement, council colleague Gerry Colbert praised Duff particularly for her efforts to preserve the city's distinctive architectural heritage.

== Honours ==
Duff was appointed to the Order of Canada on March 29, 2003, for outstanding community service. She was appointed to the Order of Newfoundland and Labrador in 2015.
