= Geoffrey Carnell =

Canadian businessman and politician

Geoffrey Conrad Carnell (January 19, 1915 – February 15, 1987) was a businessperson and politician in Newfoundland. He represented St. John's North from 1962 to 1966 in the Newfoundland House of Assembly.

The son of mayor Andrew Carnell and Mabel E. Payne, he was born in St. John's and was educated at Bishop Feild College. He entered the family undertaking and carriage manufacturing business as a wheelwright in 1932; he succeeded his father as company president in 1937. Carnell was also president of Georgetown Realty Company Ltd. and a director of Ready Credit Acceptance Corporation and the Insurance Corporation of Newfoundland. He served overseas with the 166th Newfoundland Field Regiment during World War II.

He married Joan Marguerite Milley; the couple had four children.

Carnell was elected to St. John's Municipal Council in 1957 and was reelected in 1961, 1965 and 1969 but was defeated in 1973. He was elected to the Newfoundland assembly in 1962. In 1977, he was named a judge in the Canadian Citizenship Court of Newfoundland. He also served as president for the Newfoundland branch of the Canadian Automobile Association.
