= John Joseph Murphy =

Canadian politician (1922–2010)

11th Mayor of St. John's, Newfoundland
- In office November 9, 1993 – September 30, 1997
- Deputy: Andy Wells
- Preceded by: Shannie Duff
- Succeeded by: Andy Wells
- In office November 3, 1981 – November 13, 1990
- Deputy: Shannie Duff
- Preceded by: Dorothy Wyatt
- Succeeded by: Shannie Duff

12th Deputy Mayor of St. John's, Newfoundland
- In office November 13, 1973 – November 8, 1977
- Preceded by: Len Stirling
- Succeeded by: Ray O'Neill

Personal details
- Born: September 24, 1922 St. John's, Newfoundland
- Died: December 15, 2010 (aged 88) St. John's, Newfoundland and Labrador, Canada
- Party: Liberal
- Spouse: Marjorie Halley (m. 1951)
- Relatives: Patrick F. Halley (father-in-law)
- Education: Saint Bonaventure's College
- Occupation: Broadcaster, businessman

John Joseph Murphy (September 24, 1922 – December 15, 2010 ) was a Canadian businessman and politician who was the 11th mayor of St. John's, Newfoundland.

== Biography ==
Born the son of John Murphy and Gertrude Wadden in St. John's, Newfoundland, he was educated at Saint Bonaventure's College. He worked for a time as a radio announcer with VOCM, but, following his 1951 marriage to Marjorie Halley, joined Halley and Company, a dry goods wholesale and retail firm.

Following the death of his father-in-law, Patrick Halley, in 1956, Murphy became president of the company and, as a successful businessman, expanded its iconic retail chain, The Arcade, to nine stores in the St. John's and Conception Bay South region.

Murphy ran unsuccessfully as a Liberal candidate in the 1966 provincial election and again in a by-election in 1970. Elected to St. John's City council in 1973, receiving the highest number of votes, he became deputy mayor. In 1977, he ran unsuccessfully against incumbent mayor Dorothy Wyatt, but defeated her in 1981. He won by acclamation in 1985, did not run in the 1990 election, but was elected again in 1993, He retired from city politics in 1997 after losing his bid for re-election as Mayor.

During his 17 year tenure as Deputy Mayor and Mayor, Murphy accomplished many things, but his legacy would be his success in the start of the revitalization of his historic city by lobbying federal and provincial governments for funds and programs to restore downtown residential properties. The city also began a housing program which won several national awards.

Mayor John Murphy, as he was always known until his death, served as President of The St. John’s Board of Trade, President of The Rotary Group of St. John’s and was active as a member of The Stokers Group of Rotary for over 50 years. He served as a member of The National Capital Commission in Ottawa under Pierre E. Trudeau. As a strong proponent of education, he served on The Royal Commission on Education in Newfoundland in 1967/68, sponsored public speaking contests amongst students in St. John’s, and established a scholarship at Memorial University School of Business.

On June 24, 1985, Murphy was appointed a Member of the Order of Canada and in May 2005, Murphy received the honorary degree of Doctor of Laws, honoris causa from the Memorial University of Newfoundland. However, he was most proud to receive the Freedom of The City of St. John’s, conferred on him at City Hall in June 2010, just months preceding his death.
