= 2021 Newfoundland and Labrador municipal elections =

Local elections in Canada

- September 28, 2021

Municipal elections were held in the Canadian province of Newfoundland and Labrador on September 28, 2021. This article lists the results in selected municipalities. Results are for mayoral elections unless otherwise specified.

Elections in the communities of Cottlesville and Summerford will be held on October 5, as they were postponed due to the COVID-19 pandemic in Newfoundland and Labrador. Furthermore, the council vote in Logy Bay-Middle Cove-Outer Cove will be delayed, as only one candidate came forward. And in Kippens, the election was held on November 30 due to complaints of harassment on city council.

== Bay Roberts ==
| Mayoral Candidate | Vote | % |
|---|---|---|
| Walter Yetman | Acclaimed | |

== Clarenville ==
=== Mayor ===
| Mayoral Candidate | Votes | % |
|---|---|---|
| John Pickett | 903 | 50.06 |
| Frazer Russell (X) | 901 | 49.94 |

== Conception Bay South ==
=== Mayor ===
| Mayoral Candidate | Votes | % |
|---|---|---|
| Darrin Bent | 3,099 | 48.83 |
| Brad Suter | 1,852 | 29.18 |
| Steve Tessier | 1,395 | 21.98 |

== Corner Brook ==
=== Mayor ===
| Mayoral Candidate | Votes | % |
|---|---|---|
| Jim Parsons (X) | 3,952 | 77.87 |
| Pat Callahan | 1,123 | 22.13 |

=== City Council ===
| Candidate | Votes | % |
|---|---|---|
| Linda Chaisson (X) | 3,316 | |
| Vaughn Granter (X) | 2,788 | |
| Bill Griffin (X) | 2,713 | |
| Pam Keeping | 2,618 | |
| Pamela Gill | 2,422 | |
| Charles Pender | 2,295 | |
| Donna Francis-Wheeler | 2,206 | |
| Bernd Staeben (X) | 2,113 | |
| Tony Buckle (X) | 1,962 | |
| Tom Stewart | 1,857 | |
| Pat Hickey | 1,772 | |
| Robin Parsons | 1,049 | |

== Deer Lake ==
| Mayoral Candidate | Vote | % |
|---|---|---|
| Mike Goosney | 1,207 | 51.21 |
| Dean Ball (X) | 1,150 | 48.79 |

== Gander ==
| Mayoral Candidate | Vote | % |
|---|---|---|
| Percy Farwell (X) | Acclaimed | |

== Grand Falls-Windsor ==
=== Mayor ===
| Mayoral Candidate | Votes | % |
|---|---|---|
| Barry Manuel (X) | 3,168 | 53.41 |
| Fouad (Fred) Habib | 2,462 | 41.50 |
| Terry O'Halligan | 302 | 5.09 |

=== Town Council ===
| Candidate | Votes | % |
|---|---|---|
| Mike Browne (X) | 2,870 | |
| Dave Noel | 2,502 | |
| Amy Coady-Davis (X) | 2,330 | |
| Holly Dwyer (X) | 2,247 | |
| Bob (Flipper) Hiscock | 2,184 | |
| Andrew Little | 2,125 | |
| Rod (Blackie) Bennett (X) | 2,043 | |
| Mark Whiffen (X) | 1,972 | |
| Shawn Feener | 1,857 | |
| Gerry Gardner | 1,630 | |
| Wayde Thompson | 1,557 | |
| David Hillier | 1,469 | |
| Tom Pinsent | 1,284 | |
| Doug Kelly | 1,226 | |
| David Oxford | 1,208 | |
| Kathy Oake | 1,161 | |
| Dave Canning | 1,065 | |
| Samantha Gardiner | 751 | |
| Hubert Sullivan | 310 | |

== Happy Valley-Goose Bay ==
| Mayoral Candidate | Votes | % |
|---|---|---|
| George Andrews | 884 | 32.69 |
| Bert Pomeroy | 638 | 23.59 |
| Jackie Compton-Hobbs | 519 | 19.19 |
| Jennifer Hefler-Elson | 418 | 15.46 |
| John Chiasson | 245 | 9.06 |

== Labrador City ==
In 2017, the Labrador City Town Council voted not to hold a separate election for mayor. The elected council chooses a mayor from among themselves.

| Candidate | Votes | % |
|---|---|---|
| Brian Barnett | 1,741 | 15.10 |
| Mitchell Marsh | 1,554 | 13.48 |
| Belinda Adams | 1,527 | 13.24 |
| Kim Hartery | 1,350 | 11.71 |
| Junior Humphries (X) | 931 | 8.07 |
| Ryan Pike | 922 | 8.00 |
| Dawn Willcott | 887 | 7.69 |
| Kenneth Lawlor (X) | 769 | 6.67 |
| Nick McGrath (X) | 746 | 6.47 |
| John Penney (X) | 663 | 5.75 |
| Matthew Fowler | 442 | 3.83 |

== Marystown ==
| Mayoral Candidate | Votes | % |
|---|---|---|
| Brian Keating | 1,380 | 57.91 |
| Gary Myles | 1,003 | 42.09 |

== Mount Pearl ==
=== Mayor ===
| Mayoral Candidate | Votes | % |
|---|---|---|
| Dave Aker (X) | 4,543 | 65.95 |
| Roy Locke | 2,346 | 34.05 |

=== City Council ===
| Candidate | Votes | % |
|---|---|---|
| Nicole Kieley | 4,538 | 12.79 |
| Jim Locke (X) | 4,416 | 12.45 |
| Isabelle Fry (X) | 4,208 | 11.86 |
| Chelsea Lane | 3,953 | 11.14 |
| Bill Antle (X) | 3,634 | 10.25 |
| Mark Rice | 2,993 | 8.44 |
| Denise French | 2,639 | 7.44 |
| Susan Pearcey | 2,533 | 7.14 |
| Charlene Walsh | 2,153 | 6.07 |
| Sandra Milmore | 2,103 | 5.93 |
| Terry Ryan | 1,731 | 4.88 |
| Mike Wills | 569 | 1.60 |

== Paradise ==
=== Mayor ===
| Mayoral Candidate | Vote | % |
|---|---|---|
| Dan Bobbett (X) | Acclaimed | |

=== Town Council ===
| Candidate | Votes | % |
|---|---|---|
| Kimberley Street | 2,229 | |
| Patrick Martin (X) | 2,018 | |
| Elizabeth Laurie (X) | 1,810 | |
| Glen "Bic" Carew | 1,669 | |
| Larry Vaters | 1,540 | |
| Deborah Quilty (X) | 1,344 | |
| Simon Walley | 1,337 | |
| Jamie Thornhill | 1,064 | |
| Tony Kelly | 768 | |

Town of Paradise By-Election death of Elizabeth Laurie

| Canadiate | Votes | % |
|---|---|---|
| Tommy Maher | 549 | 40% |
| Jennifer Hiscock | 396 | 29% |
| Erin Furlong | 340 | 25% |
| Tony Kelly | 75 | 5% |

== Portugal Cove–St. Philip's ==
| Mayoral Candidate | Votes | % |
|---|---|---|
| Carol McDonald (X) | 1,588 | 66.19 |
| Johnny Hanlon | 811 | 33.81 |

== St. John's ==
=== Mayor ===
| Mayoral Candidate | Vote | % |
|---|---|---|
| Danny Breen (X) | Acclaimed | |

=== Deputy Mayor ===
| Deputy Mayoral Candidate | Vote | % |
|---|---|---|
| Sheilagh O'Leary (X) | Acclaimed | |

=== City Council ===
| Candidate | Vote | % |
Ward 1
| Jill Bruce | 2,871 | 40.06 |
| Mark Nichols | 2,181 | 30.43 |
| Jenn Deon | 2,115 | 29.51 |
Ward 2
| Ophelia Ravencroft | 2,758 | 44.23 |
| Art Puddister | 1,561 | 25.03 |
| Peter Whittle | 1,237 | 19.84 |
| Derek Winsor | 680 | 10.90 |
Ward 3
| Jamie Korab (X) | 3,109 | 46.55 |
| Greg Noseworthy | 2,687 | 40.23 |
| Walter Harding | 883 | 13.22 |
Ward 4
| Ian Froude (X) | Acclaimed | |
Ward 5
| Carl Ridgeley | 2,476 | 36.34 |
| Donnie Earle | 2,462 | 36.13 |
| Scott Fitzgerald | 1,250 | 18.34 |
| Brenda Walsh | 626 | 9.19 |
At-large (4 councillors)
| Maggie Burton (X) | 16,851 | 14.74 |
| Sandy Hickman (X) | 12,992 | 11.36 |
| Ron Ellsworth | 12,933 | 11.31 |
| Debbie Hanlon (X) | 12,179 | 10.65 |
| Meghan Hollett | 11,887 | 10.40 |
| Jess Puddister | 11,487 | 10.05 |
| Greg Smith | 11,330 | 9.91 |
| Anne Malone | 6,856 | 6.00 |
| Tom Davis | 6,650 | 5.82 |
| Mark House | 4,479 | 3.92 |
| Paul Combden | 3,696 | 3.23 |
| Steve Parsons | 2,206 | 1.93 |
| Raymond Petten | 770 | 0.67 |

==== By-elections ====
A by-election was held March 12, 2024 in Ward 4 to fill the vacancy caused by the resignation of Ian Froude.

The results were as follows:

| Candidate | Vote | % |
|---|---|---|
| Tom Davis | 1,211 | 43.41 |
| Myles Russell | 657 | 23.55 |
| Greg Smith | 650 | 23.30 |
| Nicholas Hillier | 272 | 9.75 |

A by-election was held November 5, 2024 in Ward 3 to fill the vacancy caused by the resignation of Jamie Korab who was elected in the 2024 Waterford Valley provincial by-election to the Newfoundland House of Assembly.

The results were as follows:

| Candidate | Vote | % |
|---|---|---|
| Greg Noseworthy | 1,940 | 42.68 |
| Walter Harding | 958 | 21.08 |
| Scott Fitzgerald | 837 | 18.42 |
| Paul Morgan | 491 | 10.80 |
| Mark House | 319 | 7.02 |

== Stephenville ==
| Mayoral Candidate | Vote | % |
|---|---|---|
| Tom Rose (X) | 1,193 | 57.25 |
| Tom O'Brien | 891 | 42.75 |

== Torbay ==
| Mayoral Candidate | Vote | % |
|---|---|---|
| Craig Scott (X) | Acclaimed | |
