= William G. Adams =

Canadian politician (1923–2005)

The Honourable William G. Adams QC

Minister without portfolio
- In office August 16, 1971 – March 1, 1972
- Premier: Joey Smallwood

Member of the Newfoundland House of Assembly for Twillingate
- In office October 28, 1971 – March 1, 1972
- Preceded by: Leslie Curtis
- Succeeded by: Herbert Gillett

9th Mayor of St. John's, Newfoundland
- In office November 16, 1965 – November 13, 1973
- Deputy: John Crosbie (1965–1966); Len Stirling (1969–1973)
- Preceded by: Harry Mews
- Succeeded by: Dorothy Wyatt

Member of the Newfoundland House of Assembly for St. John's West
- In office November 19, 1962 – November 16, 1965
- Preceded by: Joey Smallwood
- Succeeded by: John Crosbie

9th Deputy Mayor of St. John's, Newfoundland
- In office November 14, 1961 – November 16, 1965
- Preceded by: James D. Higgins
- Succeeded by: John Crosbie

Personal details
- Born: William Gilbert Adams; June 17, 1923 St. John's, Newfoundland
- Died: November 12, 2005 (aged 82) St. John's, Newfoundland and Labrador, Canada
- Party: Liberal
- Spouse: Eve Winsor
- Education: Bishop Feild College; Dalhousie University
- Occupation: Lawyer

William Gilbert "Bill" Adams (June 17, 1923 – November 12, 2005) was the ninth mayor of St. John's and a member of the Newfoundland and Labrador House of Assembly.

Adams educated at Bishop Feild College and Dalhousie University where he received his law degree in 1952. He returned to St. John's, where he articled with R. A. Parsons. He was elected Councillor in the St. John's municipal elections and held the position as Deputy Mayor from 1962 to 1965. In 1965 he was elected Mayor and held that position for eight years. He was named Queen's Counsel in 1963.

He married Eve Winsor.

Adams was elected to the House of Assembly in 1962 as a Liberal for the district of St. John's West. He resigned that position to take his job as Mayor. In June 1971 he was appointed Minister without Portfolio in the provincial government and became MHA for Twillingate in the 1971 general election.

Adams resigned from provincial politics on March 1, 1972. In November, 1973, he was defeated in his re-election campaign by Dorothy Wyatt. Five years later, he was appointed to the bench as Judge with the Newfoundland District Court. In 1979, he was named chief justice in the district court.

He died in St. John's at the age of 82.

== See also ==
- List of people of Newfoundland and Labrador
