= James D. Ryan =

Newfoundland politician and merchant (1844–1925)

James D. Ryan MHA MLC
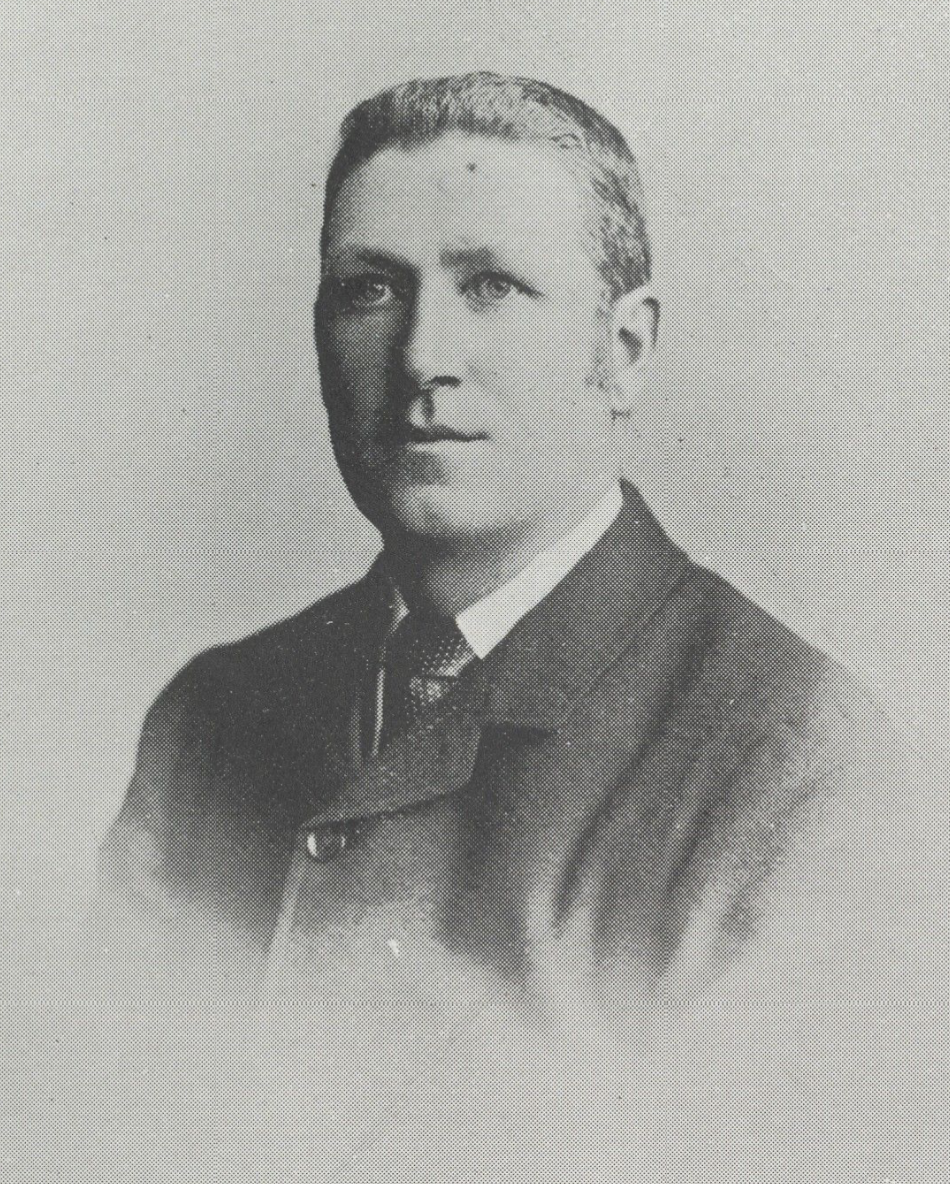
- Ryan in 1894

6th President of the Legislative Council of Newfoundland
- In office April 21, 1920 – August 19, 1924
- Prime Minister: Sir Richard Squires; William Warren
- Governor: Sir Charles Alexander Harris; Sir William Allardyce
- Preceded by: Patrick T. McGrath
- Succeeded by: Patrick T. McGrath

Member of the Legislative Council of Newfoundland
- In office 1904 – November 3, 1925
- Appointed by: Robert Bond

Member of the Newfoundland House of Assembly for Ferryland
- In office November 8, 1900 – October 31, 1904 Serving with Michael Cashin
- Preceded by: George Shea
- Succeeded by: William Ellis

Personal details
- Born: 1844 Kedra, Tipperary, Ireland
- Died: November 3, 1925 (aged 80–81) St. John's, Newfoundland
- Party: Liberal
- Occupation: Merchant

James D. Ryan (1844 – November 3, 1925) was an Irish-born merchant and politician in Newfoundland. After establishing a successful grocery business, he represented Ferryland in the Newfoundland House of Assembly from 1900 to 1904 before he was appointed to the Legislative Council of Newfoundland. He eventually served as the upper house's president from 1920 to 1924.

== Business career ==
Ryan was born in Kedra, County Tipperary, Ireland, and he was educated at New Inn and Cahir. Ryan came to Newfoundland in 1866, following his uncle Archdeacon Thomas O'Connor of Portugal Cove. He became employed as a clerk, working in Carbonear, Harbour Grace and St. John's before starting his own grocery business in 1880. Ryan was the president of the Benevolent Irish Society for 25 years, and he led the building committee for St. Patrick's Church in 1877 after it had been destroyed by fire.

== Politics ==
Ryan first entered politics in 1900 when he successfully ran as a Liberal candidate supporting Premier Robert Bond for the district of Ferryland. He served for one term before choosing to retire from the House of Assembly. Bond then appointed him to the Legislative Council of Newfoundland, where he served for most of the rest of his life. In 1919, he received a papal knighthood. The following year in 1920, he became the President of the Legislative Council and served for several years.
