= Andrew Carnell =

Newfoundland politician (1877–1951)

Doctor Andrew Carnell CBE

7th Mayor of St. John's, Newfoundland
- In office March 31, 1932 – November 8, 1949
- Deputy: James Chalker (1933–1941); Eric Cook (1941–1943); James Spratt (1945–1949)
- Preceded by: Charles Howlett
- Succeeded by: Harry Mews

3rd Deputy Mayor of St. John's, Newfoundland
- In office December 9, 1929 – March 31, 1932
- Preceded by: Joseph Fitzgibbon
- Succeeded by: James Chalker

Personal details
- Born: Andrew Greene Carnell; April 10, 1877 St. John's, Newfoundland Colony
- Died: January 26, 1951 (aged 73) St. John's, Newfoundland, Canada
- Spouse: Mabel Payne (m. 1904)
- Children: 6, including Geoffrey
- Education: Saint Bonaventure's College; University of Toronto; Philadelphia Dental College
- Occupation: Dental surgeon

Andrew Greene Carnell, CBE (April 10, 1877 – January 26, 1951) was a Newfoundland politician who served as mayor of St. John's, Newfoundland.

Born in St. John's, Carnell received his early education at Bishop Feild College and the Methodist College before going into his father's business as an undertaker. He married Mabel Payne in 1904. They had two sons and four daughters. His son Geoffrey later served in the Newfoundland assembly.

After several failed attempts in national politics, he decided to enter municipal politics. In the municipal elections of 1929 for St. John's, he was elected deputy mayor. After the sitting mayor, Charles Howlett, died in 1932, Carnell became acting mayor until he was elected to the post officially by acclamation the following year. He was reelected to the position continuously until 1949. Carnell's term spanned the time under which Newfoundland was administered by the Commission of Government, after the Dominion government had gone bankrupt and was forced to dissolve. To many Newfoundlanders, the mayor was the voice of the people as the highest-ranking official on the island that had been elected. To the dominion government, however, the city council was an inefficient nuisance. Nevertheless, Carnell was made a Commander of the Order of the British Empire in 1939.

Throughout his term, Carnell's administration continued to provide relatively stable and solvent government to St. John's, leading the way in debt relief, improving the standard and affordability of housing in the city and beginning construction on Memorial Stadium, which was finished in 1955. The 'LaGuardia of St. John's' was defeated by his deputy mayor, Harry Mews, in the 1949 election.
