= William Marshall (Canadian politician) =

Canadian politician (1935–2023)

MHA for St. John's East
- In office 1970–1986
- Preceded by: Gerald Ottenheimer
- Succeeded by: Gene Long

Personal details
- Born: August 23, 1935 St. John's, Newfoundland
- Died: June 28, 2023 (aged 87)
- Party: Progressive Conservative
- Spouse: Joan Rooney
- Profession: Lawyer, judge

William W. Marshall (August 23, 1935 – June 28, 2023) was a Canadian lawyer, judge and politician in Newfoundland. He represented St. John's East in the Newfoundland House of Assembly from 1970 to 1986.

The son of Walter Marshall and Gertrude Bolt, he was born in St. John's and was educated at Bishop Feild College, Memorial University, University of King's College and Dalhousie University. Marshall was called to the Newfoundland bar in 1958 and set up practice in St. John's. He married Joan Rooney.

In 1968, he was named eastern vice-president for the Progressive Conservative party and president of the party association and became interim leader for the party in 1969. Marshall was elected to the Newfoundland assembly in a 1970 by-election. A vocal critic of Premier Joey Smallwood, he was once assaulted in the assembly by Smallwood's son William, also a member of the assembly. Marshall later served in the provincial cabinet as a minister without portfolio, president of the executive council and as minister responsible for energy negotiations.

Marshall was named to the Appeals division of the Supreme Court of Newfoundland in 1986. Marshall retired from the court in 2003.

Marshall died on June 28, 2023, at the age of 87.
