= Sydney Woods (politician) =

Newfoundland politician (1853–1927)

Sydney Woods MHA
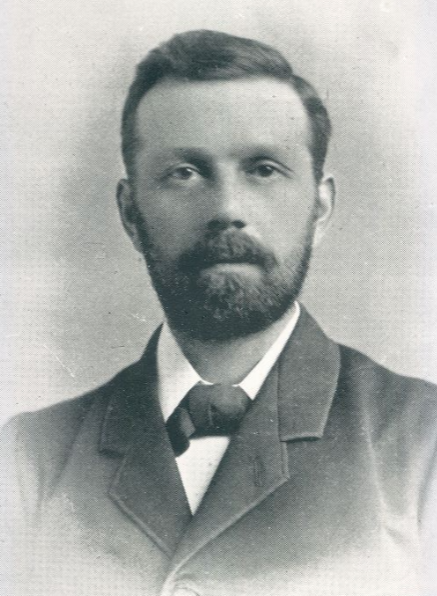
- Woods in 1894

Member of the Newfoundland House of Assembly for Bay de Verde
- In office May 22, 1894 – April 27, 1895 Serving with John B. Ayre
- Preceded by: George Moores; Henry J. B. Woods
- Succeeded by: Henry J. B. Woods

Personal details
- Born: September 13, 1853 St. John's, Newfoundland Colony
- Died: March 12, 1927 (aged 73) St. John's, Newfoundland
- Party: Liberal
- Spouse: Emma Burns
- Relatives: Henry J. B. Woods (brother)
- Occupation: Businessman

Sydney Woods (September 13, 1853 – March 12, 1927) was a merchant and politician in Newfoundland. He represented Bay de Verde in the Newfoundland House of Assembly from 1894 to 1895 as a Liberal.

He was born in St. John's and was educated at the General Protestant Academy there. He began work with his father's firm and later worked as a bookkeeper in several firms. In 1885, he established his own hardware business. His store was destroyed in the Great Fire of 1892 but he resumed business soon afterwards in a new premises. Woods was a prominent Methodist and served as president of the Methodist Academic Literary Institute. He was elected to the Newfoundland assembly in an 1894 by-election held after his brother Henry J. B. Woods was unseated. He resigned his seat in 1895 to allow his brother to run for reelection.

Woods married Emma Burns, who was originally from Nova Scotia.
