= William Rogerson =

Newfoundland politician (1860–1939)

William Rogerson MHA

Member of the Newfoundland House of Assembly for Bay de Verde
- In office October 28, 1897 – November 8, 1900 Serving with Abram Kean
- Preceded by: John B. Ayre; Henry J. B. Woods
- Succeeded by: Michael T. Knight; Henry J. B. Woods

Personal details
- Born: William Paterson Rogerson; 1860 St. John's, Newfoundland Colony
- Died: March 31, 1939 (aged 78–79) St. John's, Newfoundland
- Party: Conservative
- Spouse: Leah Syme (m. 1895)
- Children: 4 daughters
- Relatives: James J. Rogerson (father); Isabella Whiteford Rogerson (step-mother); A. J. W. McNeilly (brother-in-law)
- Occupation: Businessman

William Paterson Rogerson (1860 – March 31, 1939) was a Newfoundland businessman and politician. As a member of the Conservative Party supporting premier James S. Winter, Rogerson was the member of the Newfoundland House of Assembly (MHA) for Bay de Verde from 1897 to 1900. Rogerson spent much of his subsequent career as a supervisor of lighthouses for the Dominion of Newfoundland.

== Business career ==
Rogerson was born in St. John's to a wealthy merchant family as the son of James J. Rogerson, then the member of the House of Assembly (MHA) for Burin, and Emma Garrett Rogerson (née Blaikie). He was educated at the local Methodist College in St. John's before going to the New College in Eastbourne, England where he graduated in 1880. Rogerson initially went to New York City and worked for the shipping business Inman International Navigation Company. In 1894, he returned to St. John's to assist his aging retired father with the family business Peter Rogerson and Son following the cataclysmic Newfoundland bank crash. He married Leah Syme in 1895 and the couple had four daughters.

== Politics ==
Following in his father's footsteps, Rogerson entered politics in the 1897 general election as a Conservative candidate for the district of Bay de Verde, which his father had represented twenty years earlier. He was elected alongside sealing captain Abram Kean as supporters of the incoming premier James S. Winter. Rogerson served in the House of Assembly for only one term and was defeated in his bid for re-election in 1900 due to the immense unpopularity of the Winter administration following their renegotiated contract with railway magnate Robert G. Reid.

Rogerson was subsequently appointed by Minister of Public Works William Woodford to the Department of Lighthouses in 1906, where he spent the rest of his public career. He was eventually promoted to Superintendent of Lighthouses in 1917. Rogerson retired in 1935 soon after the Dominion of Newfoundland went under a Commission of Government. He died suddenly in St. John's on March 31, 1939.
