= Charles Howlett =

Newfoundland politician (1885–1932)

6th Mayor of St. John's, Newfoundland
- In office December 9, 1929 – March 31, 1932
- Deputy: Andrew Carnell
- Preceded by: Tasker Cook
- Succeeded by: Andrew Carnell

Personal details
- Born: Charles Joseph Howlett; January 25, 1885 St. John's, Newfoundland Colony
- Died: March 31, 1932 (aged 47) St. John's, Newfoundland
- Spouse: Eleanor M. Walsh (m. 1908)
- Education: Saint Bonaventure's College; University of Toronto; Philadelphia Dental College
- Occupation: Dental surgeon

Charles Joseph Howlett (January 25, 1885 – March 31, 1932) was a dental surgeon, politician and amateur actor in Newfoundland. He served as mayor of St. John's from 1929 to 1932.

The son of Mary Byrne and John Howlett, he was born in St. John's and was educated at St. Patrick's Hall, Saint Bonaventure's College, the University of Toronto and the Philadelphia Dental College. He set up practice in St. John's in 1906. In 1908, Howlett married Eleanor M. Walsh. Before being elected as mayor in 1929, he was active in local amateur theatre productions. From 1916 to 1929, he was president of the Newfoundland Dental Board. From 1928 to 1929, Howlett was president of the local Rotary Club.

As mayor during the Great Depression, Howlett focused on the city's finances, battling the provincial government for more control over borrowing and for access to the city's share of district grants. He initiated infrastructure improvements such as street paving which also provided much needed jobs. In 1932, he organized a civic relief committee to aid the poor of the city.

After experiencing health problems worsened by the demands of his job as mayor, Howlett died in hospital at St. John's at the age of 47.
