= Cle Newhook =

Canadian theologian and politician (1943–2018)

Leader of the Newfoundland New Democratic Party
- In office 1989–1992
- Preceded by: Peter Fenwick
- Succeeded by: Jack Harris

Personal details
- Born: Cleophas James Newhook; June 3, 1943 Norman's Cove, Newfoundland
- Died: March 2, 2018 (aged 74) St. John's, Newfoundland and Labrador, Canada
- Party: New Democratic
- Education: University of Oxford (M.A.)

Cleophas James "Cle" Newhook (June 3, 1943 – March 2, 2018) was a Canadian theologian, author and politician in Newfoundland and Labrador. He was the leader of the provincial New Democratic Party from 1989 to 1992.

== Early life and background ==
Newhook was born on June 3, 1943 in Norman's Cove, Trinity Bay to Ernest Newhook and Elizabeth (née Smith). He studied theology at the University of Oxford and spent five years as an Anglican priest in England, where he directed community educational and development programs in inner cities. In this capacity, Newhook was a chair of the British Association of Settlements and Social Action Centre. He was also a marketing consultant and the director of Landscape Newfoundland and Labrador.

== University administrator ==
Newhook was a university administrator as co-ordinator of student services at Memorial University as well as the university's chaplain. He was best known for being the director of the Ocean Ranger Families Foundation, a non-profit foundation established after the 1982 oil rig disaster that killed 84 men. The foundation organized the victims' families so that they could be represented at a public inquiry and lobbied for legislative changes to prevent future oil rig disasters

== Politics ==
Before entering electoral politics, Newhook had been involved with both the federal and provincial New Democratic parties. As the provincial party's executive secretary, Newhook ran for the leadership following the retirement of former leader Peter Fenwick, and he defeated Gene Long in the 1989 provincial NDP convention. A provincial election was called about a month later, but the party lost both of its seats amidst a Liberal surge that saw NDP support drop 10 points, which moved to the Liberals; this allowed the Liberals led by Clyde Wells to defeat the Conservative government. In 1990, while Newhook was leader, the NDP regained a seat in the House when Jack Harris won a by-election victory in St. John's East. Newhook attempted to win a seat for himself in a 1991 by-election in Trinity North but was unsuccessful despite a strong showing. In his fifth attempt to win a seat, a 1992 by-election in Ferryland, he came in third. A month later, Newhook announced that he would step down as NDP leader; he was succeeded by MHA Jack Harris.

He served on the provincial Electoral Districts Boundary Commission in 2006.

Newhook died on March 2, 2018, due to a short bout with cancer.
