= Patrick Thomas McGrath =

Newfoundland politician

Sir Patrick T. McGrath KBE
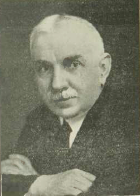

5th President of the Legislative Council of Newfoundland
- In office February 18, 1925 – June 14, 1929
- Prime Minister: Walter Stanley Monroe; Frederick C. Alderdice; Sir Richard Squires
- Governor: Sir William Allardyce; Sir John Middleton
- Preceded by: James D. Ryan
- Succeeded by: Michael Gibbs
- In office March 16, 1916 – June 5, 1919
- Prime Minister: Sir Edward Morris; John Chalker Crosbie; Sir William F. Lloyd
- Governor: Sir Walter Edward Davidson; Sir Charles Alexander Harris
- Preceded by: John Harris
- Succeeded by: James D. Ryan

Member of the Legislative Council of Newfoundland
- In office 1912 – June 14, 1929
- Appointed by: Edward Morris

Personal details
- Born: December 16, 1868 St. John's, Newfoundland Colony
- Died: June 14, 1929 (aged 60) St. John’s, Newfoundland
- Party: Conservative
- Occupation: Newspaper editor

Sir Patrick Thomas McGrath, KBE (16 December 1868 – 14 June 1929) was a Newfoundland journalist and politician.

Born in St. John's, Newfoundland, the eldest son of William McGrath and Mary Bermingham, McGrath started working as a reporter for the St John’s Evening Herald in 1891. In 1893, he was interim editor of the Evening Herald and was appointed editor in 1894. From 1897 to 1900, he was the assistant clerk of the Newfoundland and Labrador House of Assembly and was appointed clerk in 1901. In 1912, he was appointed to the Legislative Council of Newfoundland. From 1915 to 1919 and from 1925 until his death, he was president of the council.

In 1923, McGrath was a representative of Newfoundland in a meeting in Montreal between the government of Newfoundland and the government of Quebec. This meeting was looking to sell Labrador to Canada for a fair price; however, this deal would not be agreed upon.

In 1918, he was made a Knight Commander of the Order of the British Empire for his contributions to the war effort.
