= Henry J. B. Woods =

Newfoundland politician (1842–1914)

The Honourable Henry J. B. Woods MHA
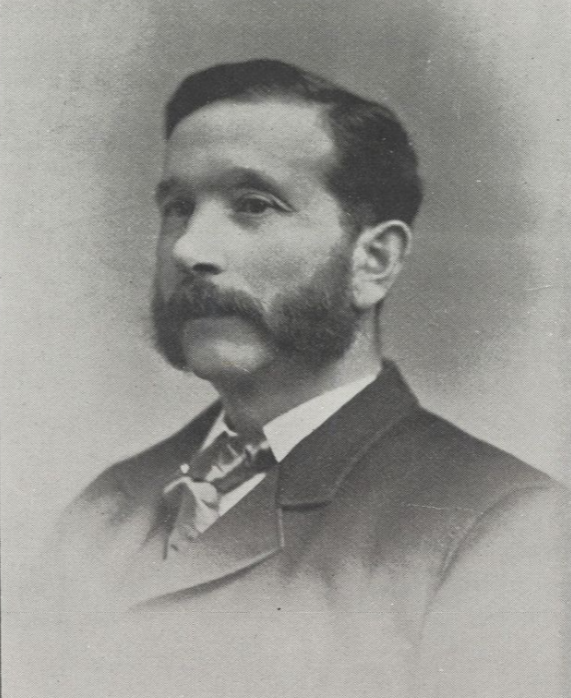
- Woods in 1894

Postmaster General of Newfoundland
- In office 1902 – September 1, 1914
- Prime Minister: Robert Bond; Edward Morris
- Preceded by: James O. Fraser
- Succeeded by: John A. Robinson

Member of the Newfoundland House of Assembly for Bay de Verde
- In office November 8, 1900 – 1902 Serving with Michael T. Knight
- Preceded by: Abram Kean; William Rogerson
- Succeeded by: Isaac Mercer
- In office February 27, 1895 – October 28, 1897 Serving with John B. Ayre
- Preceded by: Sydney Woods
- Succeeded by: Abram Kean; William Rogerson
- In office November 6, 1889 – May 22, 1894 Serving with Edward White (1889–1893); George Moores (1893–1894)
- Preceded by: Stephen R. March; A. J. W. McNeilly
- Succeeded by: John B. Ayre; Sydney Woods

Personal details
- Born: 20 October 1842 St. John's, Newfoundland
- Died: 1 September 1914 (aged 71) St. John's, Newfoundland
- Spouse: Hannah Louisa Bemister
- Relatives: Sydney Woods (brother); Harry Mews (son-in-law)
- Occupation: Businessman

Henry John Bacon Woods (October 20, 1842 – September 1, 1914) was a merchant and political figure in Newfoundland. He represented Bay de Verde from 1889 to 1894, from 1895 to 1897 and from 1900 to 1902.

He was born in St. John's, the son of John Woods and Anne Woods (Lang). His father, John Woods, was the owner of John Woods & Son where Henry started his career along with his brother Sidney. Henry married Hannah Louisa (Bemister) in 1870. Woods was unseated by petition in 1894 and was replaced by his brother Sidney in the assembly, then reelected in 1895. He was defeated when he ran for reelection in 1897. He served in the Executive Council as surveyor general from 1889 to 1894 and from 1895 to 1897 and as a minister without portfolio from 1900 to 1902. Woods resigned from the assembly in 1902 after he was named Postmaster General of Newfoundland and served until his death in St. John's at the age of 71.

His daughter Mabel was the mother of Harry Mews, a long-time mayor of St. John's.
