= 1989 New Democratic Party of Newfoundland leadership election =

- March 18, 1989
| | CN | GL |
| Candidate | Cle Newhook | Gene Long |
| Results | 126 (54.31%) | 105 (45.26%) |
Leader before election
Peter Fenwick
Leader after election
Cle Newhook

1989 New Democratic Party of Newfoundland and Labrador leadership election
- Date: March 18, 1989
- Convention: St. John's, Newfoundland
- Resigning leader: Peter Fenwick
- Won by: Cle Newhook
- Ballots: 1
- Candidates: 2

The 1989 New Democratic Party of Newfoundland leadership election was held on March 18, 1989 in St. John's. In what was the provincial party's first formal leadership race, provincial party secretary Cle Newhook won the nomination over Gene Long, the Member of the Newfoundland House of Assembly (MHA) for St. John's East.

== Leadership race and convention ==
The provincial New Democratic Party had achieved their best electoral performance yet in the 1985 election. A convention was held to choose a successor to Peter Fenwick who had led the party for eight years and was, with Long, one of only two NDP MHAs in the House of Assembly. The party held its first ever leadership race to determine Fenwick's successor.

Provincial party secretary Cle Newhook defeated Gene Long, the MHA for St. John's East, by 21 votes winning 126 votes on the first ballot to Long's 105 votes with 1 vote being spoiled.

== Results ==
| | First Ballot | |
| Candidate | Votes | Perc. |
|---|---|---|
| Cle Newhook | 126 | 54.31% |
| Gene Long | 105 | 45.26% |
| Spoiled Ballots | 1 | 0.004% |
| Totals | 232 | 100% |
