= 2013 Newfoundland and Labrador municipal elections =

Local elections in Canada

- September 24, 2013

Municipal elections were held in the Canadian province of Newfoundland and Labrador on September 24, 2013. This article lists the results in selected municipalities. Results are for mayoral elections unless otherwise specified.

== Bay Roberts ==
Candidate	Vote	%
Philip Wood (X)	1,648	63.43
Geoffrey Seymour	950	36.57

== Clarenville ==
Candidate	Vote	%
Frazer Russell	Acclaimed	

== Conception Bay South ==
Candidate	Vote	%
Ken McDonald	3,273	63.50
Woodrow French (X)	1,703	33.04
Gord Taylor	178	3.45

== Corner Brook ==
=== Mayor ===
Candidate	Vote	%
Charles Pender	4,258	60.62
Donna Francis	2,766	39.38

=== City Council ===
Candidate	Vote	%
Bernd Staeben	3,232	8.38
Linda Chaisson (X)	2,911	7.54
Keith Cormier	2,736	7.10
Tony Buckle	2,687	6.96
Josh Carey	2,554	6.62
Mary Ann Murphy	2,475	6.41
Llew Hounsell	2,455	6.36
Gerard Lee	2,136	5.54
Priscilla Boutcher (X)	2,036	5.28
Donna Luther (X)	1,953	5.06
Gary Kelly (X)	1,932	5.01
Leo Bruce (X)	1,855	4.81
Trent Quinton	1,824	4.73
Dave Wells	1,370	3.55
Paul Wylezol	1,291	3.35
John Evans	1,089	2.82
Danny Park	1,064	2.76
Chris Noseworthy	970	2.51
Tom Stewart	840	2.18
Glen Keeling	641	1.66
Shawn Street	531	1.38

== Gander ==
Candidate	Vote	%
Claude Elliott (X)	Acclaimed	

== Grand Falls-Windsor ==
Candidate	Vote	%
Al Hawkins (X)	Acclaimed	

== Happy Valley-Goose Bay ==
Candidate	Vote	%
Jamie Snook	1,715	68.90
John Hickey	774	31.10

== Labrador City ==
Candidate	Vote	%
Karen Oldford (X)	Acclaimed	

== Marystown ==
Candidate	Vote	%
Sam Synard (X)	Acclaimed	

== Mount Pearl ==
Candidate	Vote	%
Randy Simms (X)	Acclaimed	

== Paradise ==
Candidate	Vote	%
Dan Bobbett	2,368	47.88
Allan English	2,094	42.34
Kurtis Coombs	383	7.74
Darryl Power	101	2.04

== Portugal Cove-St. Philip's ==
Candidate	Vote	%
Moses G. Tucker	1,313	52.23
Bill Fagan (X)	1,201	47.77

== St. John's ==
=== Mayor ===
Candidate	Vote	%
Dennis O'Keefe (X)	20,047	56.68
Sheilagh O'Leary	14,735	41.66
Geoff Chaulk	589	1.67

=== Deputy mayor ===
Candidate	Vote	%
Ron Ellsworth	28,109	83.08
Jennifer McCreath	5,725	16.92

=== City Council ===
Candidate	Vote	%
Ward 1
Danny Breen (X)	Acclaimed	
Ward 2
Jonathan Galgay	2,959	44.77
Andrew Harvey	2,067	31.27
Scott Fitzgerald	1,584	23.96
Ward 3
Bruce Tilley (X)	2,900	41.64
Sarah Colborne Penney	2,699	38.76
Walter Harding	1,365	19.60
Ward 4
Bernard Davis	4,178	59.26
Lou Puddister	2,195	31.13
Tracy Holmes	677	9.60
Ward 5
Wally Collins (X)	4,511	73.00
Sherwin Flight	1,683	27.00
At large (4 to be elected)
Tom Hann (X)	17,775	14.57
Sandy Hickman (X)	17,580	14.41
Dave Lane	13,106	10.74
Art Puddister	12,981	10.64
Lorne Loder	12,174	9.98
Deanne Stapleton	10,838	8.88
Paul Sears	10,119	8.29
Derek Winsor	7,463	6.12
Tom Badcock	7,255	5.95
Fred Winsor	5,612	4.60
Lionel West	2,587	2.12
Cecil Whitten	2,411	1.98
Steve Manuel	2,094	1.72

==== Ward 4 by-election, February 23, 2016 ====
Candidate	Vote	%
Sheilagh O'Leary	2,725	53.29
Jill Bruce	959	18.75
Debbie Hanlon	876	17.13
Matthew White	293	5.73
Janet Kovich	261	5.10

== Stephenville ==
Candidate	Vote	%
Tom O'Brien (X)	1,094	51.85
Tom Rose	1,016	48.15

== Torbay ==
Candidate	Vote	%
Ralph Tapper	1,424	52.51
Bob Codner (X)	1,012	37.32
Brian Whitty	276	10.18
