= Michael Gibbs (politician) =

Newfoundland politician (1870–1944)

The Honourable Michael Gibbs KC
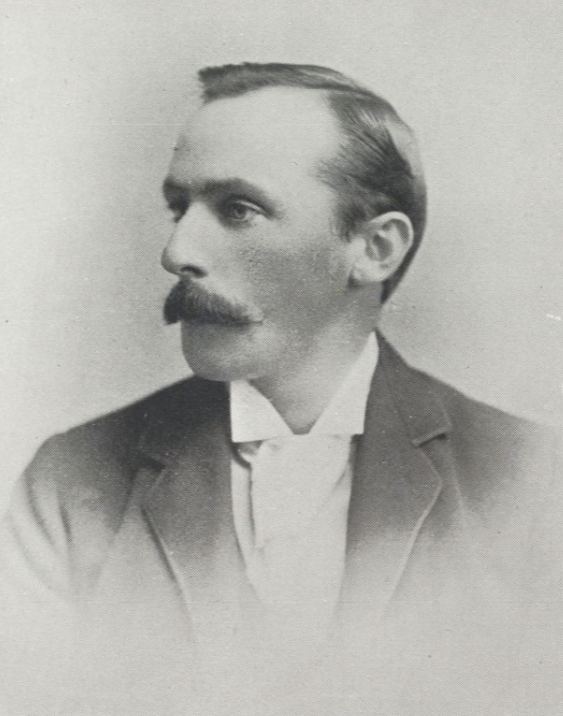
- Gibbs in 1894

7th President of the Legislative Council of Newfoundland
- In office May 28, 1930 – February 16, 1934
- Prime Minister: Frederick C. Alderdice
- Governor: Sir John Middleton; Sir David Murray Anderson
- Preceded by: Patrick T. McGrath
- Succeeded by: Position abolished

Minister without portfolio
- In office 1909 – January 5, 1918
- Prime Minister: Edward Morris

Member of the Legislative Council of Newfoundland
- In office June 7, 1909 – February 16, 1934
- Appointed by: Edward Morris

2nd Mayor of St. John's, Newfoundland
- In office June 26, 1906 – June 27, 1910
- Preceded by: George Shea
- Succeeded by: William Ellis

Member of the Newfoundland House of Assembly for St. George's
- In office October 28, 1897 – November 8, 1900
- Preceded by: Michael H. Carty
- Succeeded by: William R. Howley

Personal details
- Born: March 25, 1870 St. John's, Newfoundland Colony
- Died: November 7, 1944 (aged 74) St. John's, Newfoundland
- Party: Conservative (1897–1908); People's (1908–1909)
- Spouse: Barbara Mary Eadie (m. 1898)
- Occupation: Lawyer

Michael P. Gibbs, KC (March 25, 1870 – November 7, 1944) was a Newfoundland lawyer and politician who served as the second mayor of St. John's.

Born on March 25, 1870 in St. John's, Newfoundland, the son of John Gibbs and Marguerite Murray, he was educated at the Christian Brothers School in St. John's, and articled in law with the Hon. Michael H. Carty. Gibbs was called to the bar in 1896, and created King's Counsel in 1911. In 1898, he married Barbara Mary Eadie. Gibbs established a Tenant's League in 1892 in an attempt to have land courts established, and became in 1893 editor of the Terra Nova Advocate. He was elected as a Conservative in St. George's district in 1897, in his second attempt at a seat in the House of Assembly. He was defeated in four subsequent general elections, however, contesting a variety of districts.

While a member for St. George's (1897–1900) Gibbs established a reputation as an advocate of trade unionism and as a skilled negotiator on behalf of labour. He was instrumental in launching the Longshoremen's Protective Union (LSPU) in 1903 and remained LSPU counsel until his death. Gibbs also helped St. John's bakers and carpenters to organize, and he became Mayor of St. John's in 1906 as a Labour candidate.

When Edward Patrick Morris resigned from the Bond Administration Gibbs was offered Morris's cabinet post as Minister of Justice and Attorney General, but declined and joined Morris in forming the Newfoundland People's Party. After defeats in the ensuing general elections of 1908 and 1909 Gibbs was appointed to the Legislative Council and made Minister without portfolio in the Morris Administration, refusing further cabinet posts after Morris's resignation in 1918. Gibbs was appointed President of the Legislative Council in 1930, maintaining that position until 1934 when the council was disbanded.

He died in St. John's at the age of 73.
