= Danny Breen (politician) =

Canadian politician (born c.1962)

His Worship Danny Breen
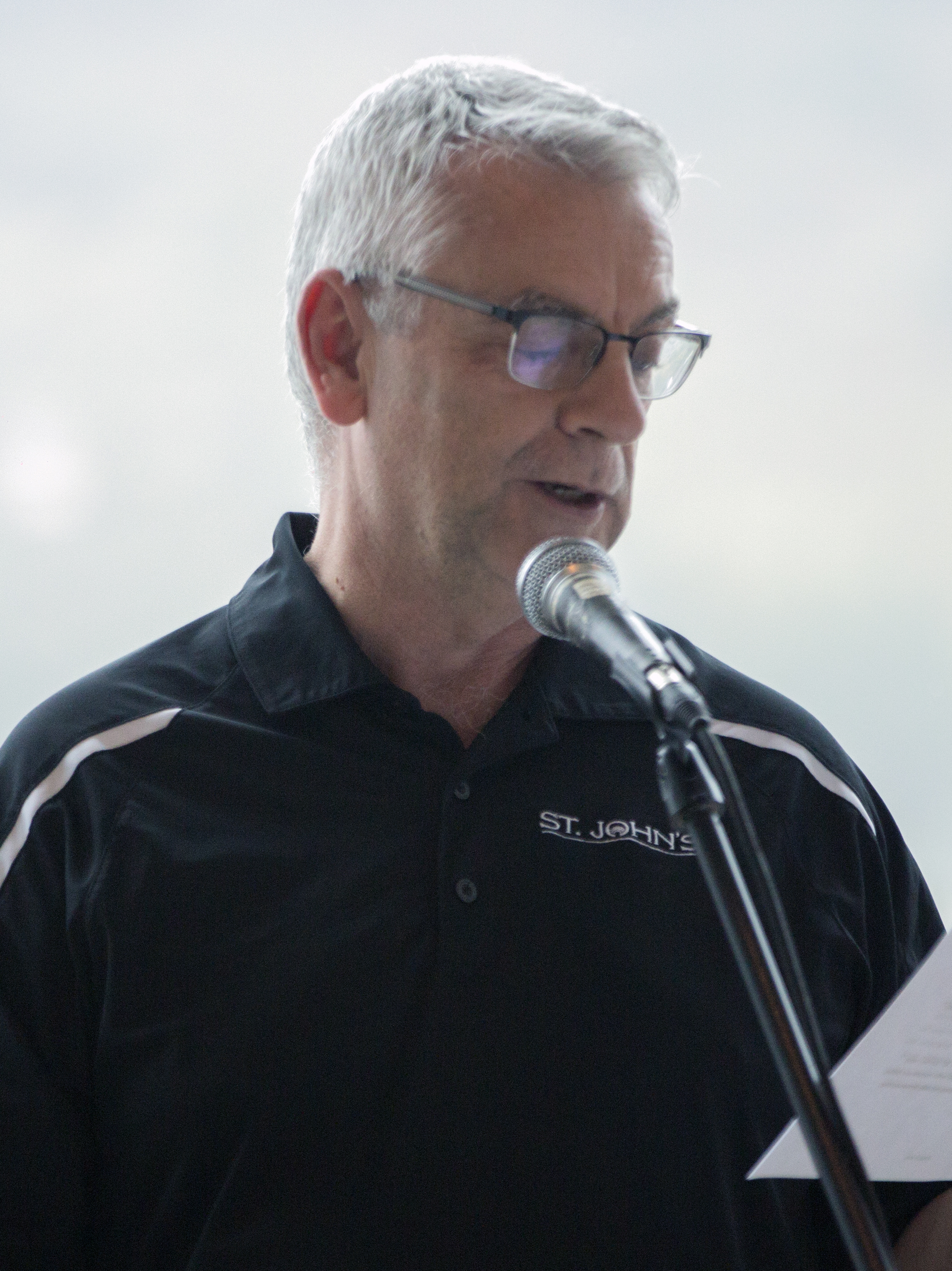
- Breen in 2017

15th Mayor of St. John's
- Incumbent
- Assumed office October 10, 2017
- Preceded by: Dennis O'Keefe

Personal details
- Born: 1962 (age 63–64) St. John's, Newfoundland and Labrador, Canada
- Party: Independent
- Other political affiliations: Progressive Conservative
- Education: Memorial University of Newfoundland (BA)

Danny Breen (born c. 1962) is a Canadian politician who serves as the 15th and current mayor of St. John's, Newfoundland and Labrador. He was elected in the 2017 municipal election on September 26, 2017. He was acclaimed for a second term in the 2021 municipal election, and subsequently re-elected for a third term in the 2025 municipal election.

Prior to his election to the mayoralty, Breen represented Ward 1 on St. John's City Council from 2009 until 2017. He ran as a Progressive Conservative candidate for the Newfoundland and Labrador House of Assembly in a 2014 by-election in the electoral district of Virginia Waters, but was defeated by Liberal Cathy Bennett.

Breen is a graduate of Memorial University of Newfoundland with a Bachelor of Arts degree in Political Science and History.

== Personal life ==
Breen was born and raised in St. John’s, where he grew up with 6 brothers and sisters. He currently resides in St. John with his wife Ann, and has two daughters Erika and Katie, and grandchildren Kyla and Neil.

== Electoral history ==
2009 municipal election
Candidate	Vote	%
Ward 1
Danny Breen	3,402	41.09
Art Puddister (X)	3,184	38.46
Dave Lee	1,693	20.45

By-election April 9, 2014 On the resignation of Kathy Dunderdale, February 28, 2014
Party	Candidate	Votes	%	±%
Liberal	Cathy Bennett	1932	39.88	+30.33
Progressive Conservative	Danny Breen	1892	39.05	-20.99
NDP	Sheilagh O'Leary	1021	21.07	-9.35
Total valid votes		4,895		
Rejected				
Turnout				
Liberal gain from Progressive Conservative		Swing		+25.66

2017 Newfoundland and Labrador municipal elections: Mayor of St. John's
Candidate	Vote	%
Danny Breen	20,261	53.19
Andy Wells	12,604	33.09
Renee Sharpe	5,225	13.72

2021 Newfoundland and Labrador municipal elections: Mayor of St. John's
Mayoral Candidate	Vote	%
Danny Breen (X)	Acclaimed	

2025 Newfoundland and Labrador municipal elections: Mayor of St. John's
Candidates	Votes	%
Danny Breen (X)	15,216	56.74
Ivy Hanley	11,603	43.26
