= Michael Gibbs (poet) =

British poet and visual artist

Michael Gibbs (1949-2009) was a British poet and visual artist. He lived and worked in Amsterdam from 1974 until his death in 2009.

== Artwork ==
Gibbs's work consisted primarily of concrete and visual poetry, video, photography, as well as mail art and artists' books. Gibbs was active in Fluxus beginning in 1968. Gibbs was associated with De Appel arts center in the 1970s.

== Publishing ==
While a student, Gibbs began publishing his art magazine titled Kontexts, which included interviews with writers including William Burroughs and Brion Gysin.

He later published a second magazine titled Artzien, which had 28 issues between 1978 and 1982. Artzien collected reviews of exhibitions written by visual artists.

In the 1990s, he started an internet project called Nondescript Productions, and went on to produce online publications including Why Not Sneeze?

== Exhibitions ==
Gibbs's work was the subject of a 2016 festival and exhibition "Let it Keep Secrets" at de Appel Arts center in de Appel arts centre in Amsterdam.
