= Hugh Shea =

Canadian businessman and politician

Hugh Joseph Shea (1932 – 1993) was a businessperson and politician in Newfoundland. He represented St. John's South in the Newfoundland House of Assembly from 1971 to 1972.

The son of William Shea and Ellen Cleary, he was born in St. John's and was educated there. Shea worked for the Canadian government in Corner Brook and in Egypt. He then opened a corner store in Kilbride. He married Rose-Marie Power.

He was an unsuccessful candidate for the leadership of the provincial Progressive Conservative party in 1970. He was elected to the Newfoundland assembly as a Progressive Conservative in 1971. After he was not named to Frank Moores' cabinet in 1972, he sat as an independent and then as a Liberal. Shea was defeated when he ran for a Harbour Main seat later that year. He was an unsuccessful candidate for the St. John's West seat in the Canadian House of Commons in 1972, running as an independent. He ran unsuccessfully as a Liberal in St. John's East in 1985 and in St. John's Centre.

In 1976, Shea published Shea's Newfoundland seduced. He operated a convenience store in St. John's during the 1970s and then ran a takeout restaurant, retiring in 1990. Comedian Rick Mercer's first job was peeling potatoes at Shea's takeout restaurant, known as Hamburger Hell.
