= Andy Wells (Canadian politician) =

Canadian politician

13th Mayor of St. John's
- In office September 30, 1997 – March 3, 2008
- Preceded by: John Joseph Murphy
- Succeeded by: Dennis O'Keefe (acting)

St. John's City Councillor
- In office 1977 – November 13, 1990
- Constituency: Ward 1

Personal details
- Born: Andrew Wells; 1944/1945 St.John's, Dominion of Newfoundland
- Died: June 25, 2021 (aged 75–77)
- Party: Independent
- Education: Prince of Wales College (BA, 1966; BA, 1969)

Andrew Wells (1944/5 – June 2021) was a Canadian politician who served as the 13th mayor of St. John's from 1997 to 2008 in Newfoundland and Labrador, Canada.

He graduated from Prince of Wales College in 1961 and later obtained a Bachelor of Arts degree in history and a Bachelor of Arts degree in education in 1966 and 1969, respectively. He was elected as a councillor in 1977, and served on the St. John's City Council until he resigned as Mayor in 2008. Wells ran for Mayor in the 2017 municipal election, but was unsuccessful.

== Mayor of St. John's ==
He was first elected as the city's mayor in 1997, and was re-elected in 2001 and 2005.

Wells attracted considerable media attention in Newfoundland and Labrador and other parts of Canada due to his gruff, outspoken personality. He appeared on the Rick Mercer Report as a nominee for "Craziest Mayor in Canada." He is noted for many scandals such as various insults to other council members.

In 1998, Wells flew the Tibetan flag as a protest of the Chinese occupation of Tibet during a visit by a Chinese delegation.

Wells has also been an object of controversy regarding neighbouring communities. He is famous for wanting to amalgamate its sister city, Mount Pearl. His most notable saying is "bring it on, I have never backed down from a good fight".

== Resignation and Public Utilities Board ==
In 2008, Wells was appointed chair and chief executive officer of the provincial public utilities board, which oversees electricity, water, waste management and other services for towns and cities. Controversy arose soon after when Wells refused to resign his position as mayor, citing reasons such as higher costs for a by-election or a lack of legislation against it. Many believed a conflict-of-interest would result, and that Wells would not be objective in his decisions. Most of the controversy was settled, however, when on February 12, Premier Danny Williams released a statement saying that while he still believed Wells could perform both tasks, he would be delaying Wells' appointment until after he resigned as mayor.

On February 19, 2008, Wells announced that he would step down from the mayoral position on March 3. Wells was attempting to delay his departure long enough so the city of St. John's would not have to run a by-election that Wells claimed would cost the city $400,000.

On March 3, 2008, Wells became head of the Public Utilities Board. He was suspended from this position in 2017 as a result of criticisms against the St. John's City Council sent from his government email. The investigation into his conduct was dropped soon after when Wells resigned to run for mayor again in the 2017 municipal election.

== Later life and death ==
Wells announced in August 2017, that he would run for Mayor of St. John's again in the 2017 municipal election. His announcement came after weeks of criticizing St. John's City Council, specifically then-Mayor Dennis O'Keefe and councillors Danny Breen and Jonathan Galgay. He lost the mayoral election to Breen, winning 33.09 per cent of the vote to Breen's 53.19 per cent.

Wells died on June 25, 2021.

== Electoral history ==
2005 municipal election
Candidate	Vote	%
Andy Wells (inc.)	25,136	86.0
Ray O'Neill	4,108	14.0

2017 Newfoundland and Labrador municipal elections: Mayor of St. John's
Candidate	Vote	%
Danny Breen	20,261	53.19
Andy Wells	12,604	33.09
Renee Sharpe	5,225	13.72
