= Sheilagh O'Leary =

Canadian politician

Sheilagh O'Leary MHA
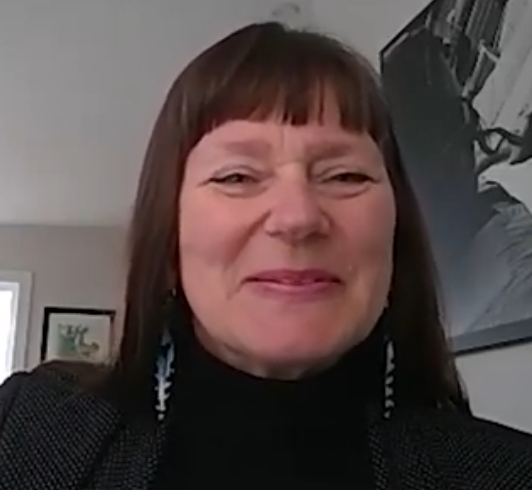
- O'Leary in 2024

Member of the Newfoundland and Labrador House of Assembly for St. John's East-Quidi Vidi
- Incumbent
- Assumed office November 3, 2025
- Preceded by: John Abbott

House leader of the New Democratic Party of Newfoundland and Labrador
- Incumbent
- Assumed office November 3, 2025
- Preceded by: Jordan Brown

Deputy Mayor of St. John's, Newfoundland and Labrador
- In office October 10, 2017 – August 27, 2025
- Preceded by: Ron Ellsworth
- Succeeded by: Ron Ellsworth

Personal details
- Born: September 17, 1964 (age 62) St. John's, Newfoundland, Canada
- Party: New Democratic Party
- Education: Memorial University of Newfoundland (M.F.A.)
- Occupation: Businessperson politician artist

Sheilagh Ethne O'Leary (born September 17, 1964) is a Canadian politician from the New Democratic Party of Newfoundland and Labrador. She was elected to the Newfoundland and Labrador House of Assembly for the district of St. John's East-Quidi Vidi in the 2025 provincial election. O'Leary is a photographer.

== Municipal politics ==
Prior to entering the House of Assembly, O'Leary was the deputy mayor of St. John's, having been first elected in 2017, and re-elected in 2021 by acclamation.

Before then, O'Leary was a councillor on the St. John's City Council, having first been elected in 2009 before running for mayor in 2013, where she came in second to Dennis O'Keefe. She returned to council in 2016 serving until her election as deputy mayor.

== Provincial politics ==
O'Leary ran in the 2021 provincial election with the NDP in Mount Scio losing to incumbent Sarah Stoodley. She also ran in the 2014 Virginia Waters by-election coming in third behind Cathy Bennett.

O'Leary was elected to the Newfoundland and Labrador House of Assembly for the district of St. John's East-Quidi Vidi in the 2025 provincial election.

In 2026, O'Leary endorsed Avi Lewis in that year's federal NDP leadership race.

On September 17, 2026, O'Leary voted against the Churchill Falls Definitive Cooperation and Implementation Agreement (DCIA) in the House of Assembly along with the Liberal caucus and Independent MHA Keith Russell.

== Electoral history ==
=== Provincial ===
2025 Newfoundland and Labrador general election: St. John's East-Quidi Vidi
Party	Candidate	Votes	%	±%
New Democratic	Sheilagh O'Leary	2,886	49.90	+7.87
Liberal	John Whelan	2,458	42.50	-0.45
Progressive Conservative	Alex Cepovski	440	7.61	-7.42
Total valid votes		5,784	99.4	
Total rejected ballots		32	0.55	
Turnout		5,816	52.75	
Eligible voters		11,024		
New Democratic gain from Liberal		Swing		+4.17

2021 Newfoundland and Labrador general election: Mount Scio
Party	Candidate	Votes	%	±%
Liberal	Sarah Stoodley	2,011	46.60	+4.93
Progressive Conservative	Damian Follett	1,152	26.70	-10.52
New Democratic	Sheilagh O'Leary	1,074	24.89	+12.33
NL Alliance	Andrea Newbury	60	1.39	-7.15
Independent	Larry Borne	18	0.42	
Total valid votes		4,315		
Total rejected ballots				
Turnout				
Eligible voters				
Liberal hold		Swing		+7.72
Source(s) "Officially Nominated Candidates General Election 2021" (PDF). Elections Newfoundland and Labrador. "NL Election 2021 (Unofficial Results)".

By-election April 9, 2014 On the resignation of Kathy Dunderdale, February 28, 2014
Party	Candidate	Votes	%	±%
Liberal	Cathy Bennett	1932	39.88	+30.33
Progressive Conservative	Danny Breen	1892	39.05	-20.99
NDP	Sheilagh O'Leary	1021	21.07	-9.35
Total valid votes		4,895		
Rejected				
Turnout				
Liberal gain from Progressive Conservative		Swing		+25.66

=== Municipal ===
2021 St. John's Deputy Mayor election
	Vote	%
Sheilagh O'Leary (X)	Acclaimed	

2017 St. John's Deputy Mayor election
Candidate	Vote	%
Sheilagh O'Leary	30,689	84.21
Michelle Worthman	5,753	15.79

Ward 4 by-election, February 23, 2016
Candidate	Vote	%
Sheilagh O'Leary	2,725	53.29
Jill Bruce	959	18.75
Debbie Hanlon	876	17.13
Matthew White	293	5.73
Janet Kovich	261	5.10

2013 St. John's Mayor election
Candidate	Vote	%
Dennis O'Keefe (X)	20,047	56.68
Sheilagh O'Leary	14,735	41.66
Geoff Chaulk	589	1.67

2009 St. John's at-large councillor election
Candidate	Vote	%
Sheilagh O'Leary	24,056	19.82
Sandy Hickman (X)	17,562	14.47
Tom Hann (X)	17,079	14.07
Gerry Colbert (X)	16,183	13.34
Bernard Davis	15,078	12.43
Simon Lono	14,705	12.12
Tom Badcock	8,650	7.13
Barry Buckle	4,352	3.59
Stephen Nolan	3,684	3.04
