= Maggie Burton (poet) =

Canadian writer, musician and politician

Maggie Burton is a Canadian writer, musician and politician from St. John's, Newfoundland and Labrador. Her debut poetry collection, Chores, was the winner of the First Book Prize from the Griffin Poetry Prize, and was shortlisted for the Gerald Lampert Award, in 2024.

Originally from Brigus, she moved to St. John's in 2009 to study music at Memorial University of Newfoundland. She teaches violin in St. John's, and has performed as a violinist with the Newfoundland Symphony Orchestra, the St. John's New Music Collective and the Avalonia Duo.

She served on St. John's City Council from 2017 to 2025. In the fall of 2025, she entered medical school at Memorial University.
