= Legislative Council of Newfoundland =

Former upper house of Newfoundland Legislature

Type
- Type: Upper house of the General Assembly of Newfoundland

History
- Founded: 1833
- Disbanded: 1934
- Preceded by: none
- Succeeded by: none

The Legislative Council meeting in 1933

The Legislative Council of Newfoundland was the upper house of the General Assembly of Newfoundland from 1833 to 1934.

The Legislative Council was appointed by the governor of Newfoundland, not elected. Bills were submitted by the House of Assembly to the Council, which could approve, reject or amend them; if amended, bills were returned to the House of Assembly for approval.

From 1842 to 1848, the elected House of Assembly and the appointed Legislative Council sat together as a single Amalgamated Assembly. After 1848, the two legislative bodies again sat separately.

In 1854, the British Government granted a new constitution to Newfoundland establishing an Executive Council of not more than seven members of the majority party and a Legislative Council of not more than 15 members upon nomination of the ministry.

The Legislative Council of Newfoundland and the House of Assembly met for the last time on December 2, 1933 to pass the legislation which provided for their suspensions. The Royal Commission which was established in 1933 concluded that Newfoundland's problems were self-made, as noted in the Amulree Report, and it was recommended that the legislature be suspended and be replaced by a Commission of Government appointed by the British Government.

When the Newfoundland House of Assembly was reinstituted following the admission of the dominion into Canadian Confederation the Legislative Council was not brought back into existence. However, Term 14(2) of the Newfoundland Terms of Union allows for the province to re-establish the Legislative Council.

== List of Presidents of the Legislative Council ==
No.	Portrait	Name (Birth–Death)	Term of office		Ref.
1		Laurence O'Brien (1792–1870)	June 18, 1855	April 28, 1870	
2		Edward Morris (1813–1887)	May 2, 1870	May 6, 1885	
3		Edward Dalton Shea (1820–1913)	February 17, 1886	March 29, 1911	
4		John Harris (1860–1915)	February 14, 1912	June 5, 1915	
5 (1)		Patrick T. McGrath (1868–1929)	March 16, 1916	June 5, 1919	
6		James D. Ryan (1844–1925)	April 21, 1920	August 19, 1924	
5 (2)		Patrick T. McGrath (1868–1929)	February 18, 1925	June 1, 1929	
7		Michael Gibbs (1870–1944)	May 28, 1930	December 2, 1933	

== See also ==
- Dominion of Newfoundland
- Responsible government
- Legislative Council
