= St. John's City Council =

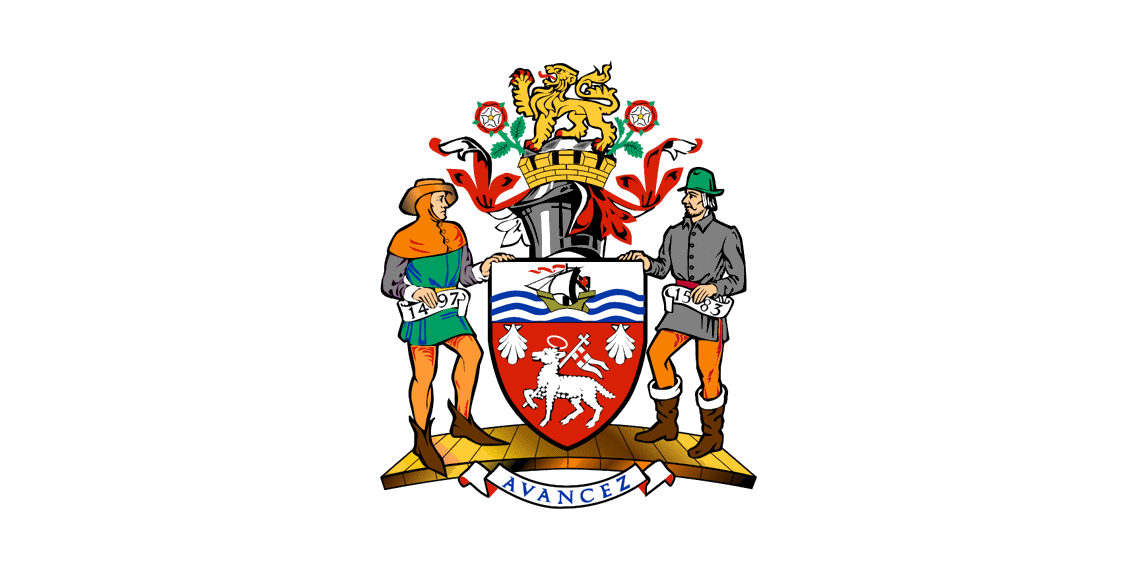

- Logo

Type
- Type: Unitary authority

Leadership
- Mayor: Danny Breen since 2017
- Seats: 11

Elections
- Voting system: Single-member plurality

Motto
- Avancez

Website
- https://www.stjohns.ca/

St. John's City Council is the governing body of the city of St. John's, Newfoundland and Labrador. Since 1888, St. John's city council has governed under the Colony of Newfoundland, the Dominion of Newfoundland and since 1949, Canada.

The city council currently comprises 11 members: the Mayor, the Deputy Mayor and nine councillors, five which represent wards throughout the city and four that are elected at large.

== 2025-2029 council ==
Councillor	Ward
Danny Breen	Mayor
Ron Ellsworth	Deputy Mayor
Kate Cadigan	At large
Lynn Hammond	At large
Sandy Hickman	At large
Nikita Ryall	At large
Jill Bruce	Ward 1
Brenda Halley	Ward 2
Greg Noseworthy	Ward 3
Tom Davis	Ward 4
Donnie Earle	Ward 5

== 2021-2025 council ==
Councillor	Ward
Danny Breen	Mayor
Sheilagh O'Leary (Until August 26, 2025)	Deputy Mayor
Maggie Burton	At large
Sandy Hickman	At large
Ron Ellsworth	At large
Debbie Hanlon (Until March. 4, 2025) Vacant (From March. 4, 2025)	At large
Jill Bruce	Ward 1
Ophelia Ravencroft	Ward 2
Jamie Korab (until Aug. 22, 2024); Greg Noseworthy (from Nov. 5, 2024)	Ward 3
Ian Froude (until Dec. 22, 2023)	Ward 4
Tom Davis (since Mar. 2024)	Ward 4
Carl Ridgeley	Ward 5

== 2017-2021 council ==
Councillor	Ward
Danny Breen	Mayor
Sheilagh O'Leary	Deputy Mayor
Maggie Burton	At large
Dave Lane	At large
Sandy Hickman	At large
Debbie Hanlon	At large
Deanne Stapleton	Ward 1
Hope Jamieson (until July 6, 2020); Shawn Skinner (since 2020)	Ward 2
Jamie Korab	Ward 3
Ian Froude	Ward 4
Wally Collins	Ward 5

== 2013-2017 council ==
Councillor	Ward
Dennis O'Keefe	Mayor
Ron Ellsworth	Deputy Mayor
Dave Lane	At large
Art Puddister	At large
Tom Hann	At large
Sandy Hickman	At large
Danny Breen	Ward 1
Jonathan Galgay	Ward 2
Bruce Tilley	Ward 3
Sheilagh O'Leary (2016-2017); Bernard Davis (2013-2015)	Ward 4
Wally Collins	Ward 5

== See also ==
- 2013 Newfoundland and Labrador municipal elections
- 2017 Newfoundland and Labrador municipal elections
- 2021 Newfoundland and Labrador municipal elections
- 2025 Newfoundland and Labrador municipal elections
