= George River (Quebec) =

River in Quebec, Canada

George River Rivière George Kangirsualujjuap Kuunga ᒧᓱᐛᐤ ᓯᐱᔾ
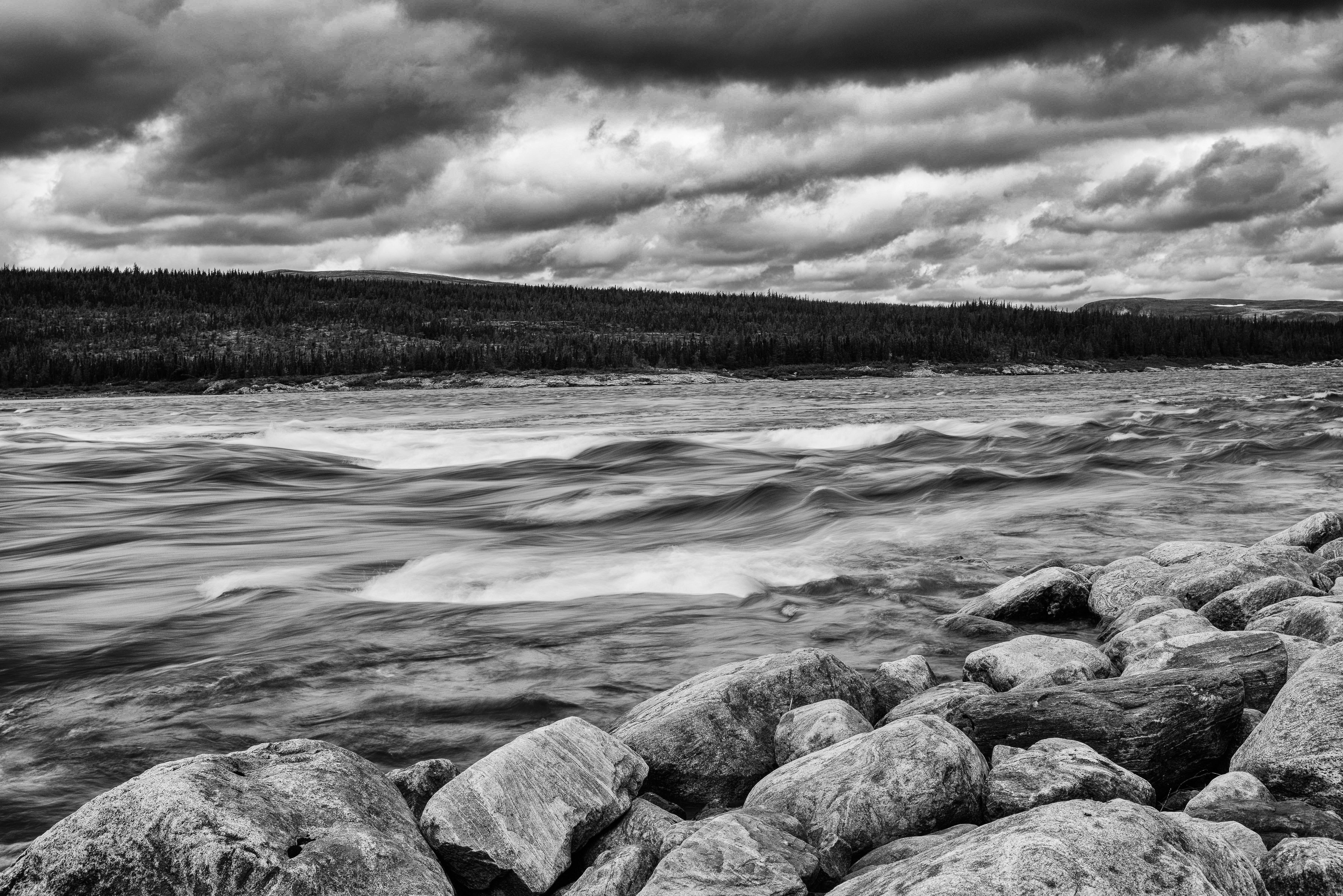

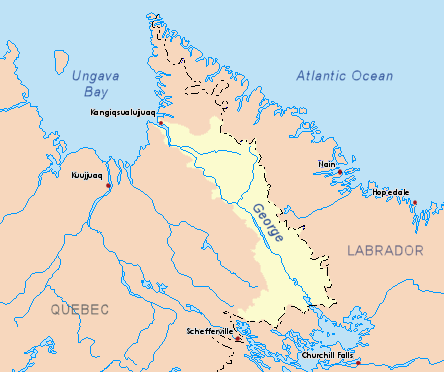
- Map of the George River basin

Location
- Country: Canada
- Province: Quebec
- Region: Nord-du-Québec

Physical characteristics
- Source: Lake Jannière
  - location: Lac-Juilet Unorg. Territory, Caniapiscau RCM
  - coordinates: 54°51′30″N 63°55′30″W
  - elevation: 488 m (1,601 ft)
- Mouth: Ungava Bay
  - location: 18 km NW of Kangiqsualujjuaq, Kativik
  - coordinates: 58°49′00″N 66°10′00″W
  - elevation: 0 m (0 ft)
- Length: 565 km (351 mi)
- Basin size: 41,700 km^{2} (16,100 sq mi)
- Discharge
  - average: 940 m^{3}/s (33,000 cu ft/s)

The George River, (Note: Inuktitut: Kangirsualujjuap Kuunga, 'River of the Great Bay' Naskapi: ᒧᓱᐛᐤ ᓯᐱᔾ, romanized: musuwaaw-siipiiy or Mushuan Shipu, 'River without Trees' Innu: Metsheshu Shipu, 'Eagle River') formerly the East (Note: Distinguishing it from the "South River", a former name of the Koksoak.) or George's River, is a river in northeastern Quebec, Canada, that flows from Lake Jannière mainly north to Ungava Bay.

The George is a big and wide river. It offers relatively easy and inexpensive access to Ungava Bay, compared to other major rivers of this area, making it popular for canoe camping trips.

== Geography ==
The George River originates about 175 kilometres (109 mi) east of Schefferville in Lake Jannière, between bogs and swamps. The headwater lakes are shallow, connected by rushing rapids. After Lake Advance, the river runs through heavy whitewater until it reaches Indian House Lake (Naskapi: Mushuan Nipi, "Big Lake in the Barrens"), which stretches 60 kilometres (37 mi) if measured by Canadian topo maps, or 100 kilometres (62 mi) if measured by its flatwater character.

After Indian House Lake, the George really starts to flow. It offers an abundance of rapids with various levels of difficulty until it reaches Kangiqsualujjuaq close to Ungava Bay. Because of its easy access, many people without the necessary experience and skills have travelled this river and unfortunately some lost their lives. The river is big and powerful. The power of the George leaves no room for error. Climatic conditions are ideal for hypothermia. Canoeists have to contend also with serious tidal effects in the last 40 kilometres (25 mi).

== History ==
The George River received its present name on 12 August 1811, by two Moravian missionaries Benjamin Gottlieb Kohlmeister and George Kmoch. These two missionaries came first to Okak in Labrador, then to Ungava Bay with a vision to evangelize the Inuit. They wrote in their diary: "We then proclaimed the name of the Kangertlualuksoak to be henceforth George River, upon which every man fired his piece three times, the vollies being answered from the boat". The Moravian brothers wanted to honour George III, king of Great Britain and Ireland from 1760, who, in 1769, granted the Moravians land on the Labrador coast for permanent settlement.

John McLean, the factor of the Hudson's Bay Company outpost at Fort Chimo (present-day Kuujjuaq), established Fort Severight (present-day Kangiqsualujjuaq) at the mouth of the George in 1838. The Inuit of the area never settled around the post, preferring to live along the coast in summer and setting their camps about 50 km (30 mi) inland in winter.

In June 1839, McLean took a party up the George in his search for a convenient overland route between Ungava Bay and Fort Smith (present-day North West River) on Lake Melville. His predecessor Erland Erlandson had accidentally demonstrated its feasibility in 1834, but along a more circuitous route up the Koksoak. Lacking Innu guides, McLean's expedition ended in failure with the discovery of the Grand Falls (now Churchill Falls) on the Hamilton (now the Churchill) and the party retraced its steps. On the eastern shore of Erlandson's Lake (now Indian House Lake), they erected a post called Fort Trial in the winter of 1839–1840 to serve as a waystation and depot on the supply route they had established with Fort Nascopie on Petitsikapau Lake in the interior. Fort Trial—also referenced in HBC correspondence as "Erlandson's Post"—became superfluous with McLean's 1841 discovery of a route through a series of lakes around the falls and its rapids, after which the prosperous Fort Nascopie was supplied from Fort Smith instead. The HBC closed the entire unprofitable Ungava District soon after, abandoning Fort Trial on 15 June 1842 and Fort Severight around the same time.

The old fort at the mouth of the river was reopened by the Hudson's Bay Company in September 1876, mostly to capture the local indigenous peoples' trade which had been going to the Moravians. The site abandoned again in the summer of 1878 before reopening again in 1883, after which it mostly served as a fishery for Fort Chimo until its closure in June 1952.

The George River was also the site of the ill-fated Leonidas Hubbard expedition of 1903. The subsequent successful canoe expeditions of Mina Hubbard and Dillon Wallace in 1905 and Hesketh Prichard in 1910 also followed the George.

== George River caribou herd (GRCH) ==
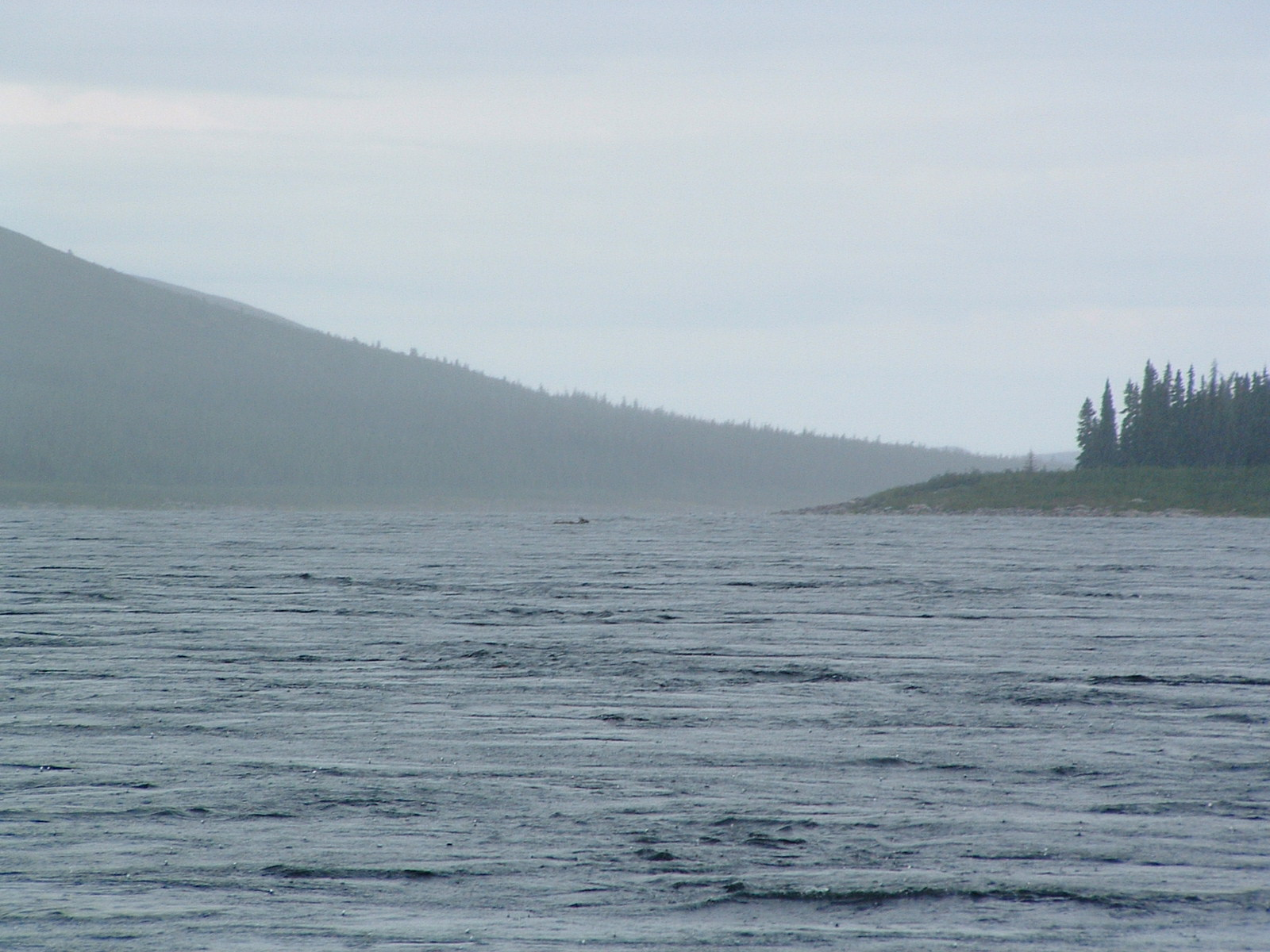
George River Caribou Herd swimming across George River 2008

The migratory George River caribou herd (GRCH), in the Ungava region of Quebec and Labrador in eastern Canada was once the world's largest herd with 800 000–900 000 animals. Although it is categorized as a subspecies Rangifer tarandus caribou, the woodland caribou, the GRCH is migratory and like the barren-ground caribou its ecotype may be tundra caribou, Arctic, northern of migratory, not forest-dwelling and sedentary like most Woodland caribou ecotypes. It is unlike most woodland caribou in that it is not sedentary.

The dramatic decline in numbers of the George River herd has raised concerns. (Note: The Species at Risk Act and Environment Canada do not include the Ungava caribou herds as part of the boreal caribou herds.) In the 1980s there were between 700,000 and 800,000 in the herd caribou migrating between northern Quebec and Labrador. By 2010 there were 74,000. By 2012 the numbers dropped to 27,600 and by 2014 there were only 14,200.

The "George River herd which morphologically and genetically belong to the woodland caribou subspecies, at one time represented the largest caribou herd in the world and migrating thousands of kilometers from boreal forest to open tundra, where most females calve within a three-week period. This behaviour is more like barren-ground caribou subspecies." They argued that "understanding ecotype in relation to existing ecological constraints and releases may be more important than the taxonomic relationships between populations."

According to a National Geographic Daily News article, the George River Caribou Herd (GRCH) (Rivière-George) numbered only 3,500 animals in the late 1940s. In 1958 the George River caribou herd was estimated to be numbered at 15,000. By 1988, it was the largest herd in the world with a population of 700,000. And by 1993 the numbers rose to 775,000 animals. By 2001, the herd was at 385,000 animals and continuing to decrease, totaling 75,000 animals in 2010. The most recent survey puts the herd size at fewer than 28,000. The George River herd, south of Ungava Bay, whose numbers reached about 800 000 towards 1993, had about 384 000 individuals in 2001.

In January 2013 the Innu, Inuit and Cree of Quebec and Nunatsiavut, NunatuKavut, and the Innu of Labrador formed the Ungava Peninsula Caribou Aboriginal Round Table (Note: The Inuit of Nunavik, the Inuit of Nunatsiavut, the NunatuKavut Community Council, the Naskapi Nation of Kawawachikamach, the Grand Council of the Crees of Eeyou Istchee/Cree Regional Authority (GCCEI/CRA), the Innu Nation of Labrador and all the Innu communities from the Québec region.) held emergency meetings and issued a joint statement. in respond to the "critical decline" of the George River Caribou Herd (GRCH) and the "uncertain future" of the Leaf River Caribou Herd (LRCH) and Torngat Caribou Herds.

The land is changing and the impacts of climate change, industrial development, and the growing human population and easier accessibility of the herd cannot be ignored in the management actions to be put forward. With the exponential rate of development, the protection of caribou habitat is greatly deficient and needs to be addressed seriously.

— Ungava Peninsula Caribou Aboriginal Round Table

The Government of Nunatsiavut recommended that the "George River caribou calving grounds by designating a 14,000 km2 protection zone under the Regional Land Use Plan for the Labrador Inuit Settlement Area."

GRCH
year	population
late 1940s	3,500
1958	15,000
1988	700,000
mid-1990s	750,000
2001	385,000
2011	74,000
2012	27,600
2014	14,200

Since the mid-1990s, the herd declined sharply and by 2010, it was reduced to 74,131—a drop of up to 92%. A 2011 survey confirms a continuing decline of the George River migratory caribou herd population. By 2014 the herd was estimated to be about to 14 200, down from 27,600 in 2012, 74 131 in 2010 and 385 000 in 2001.

== Image gallery ==
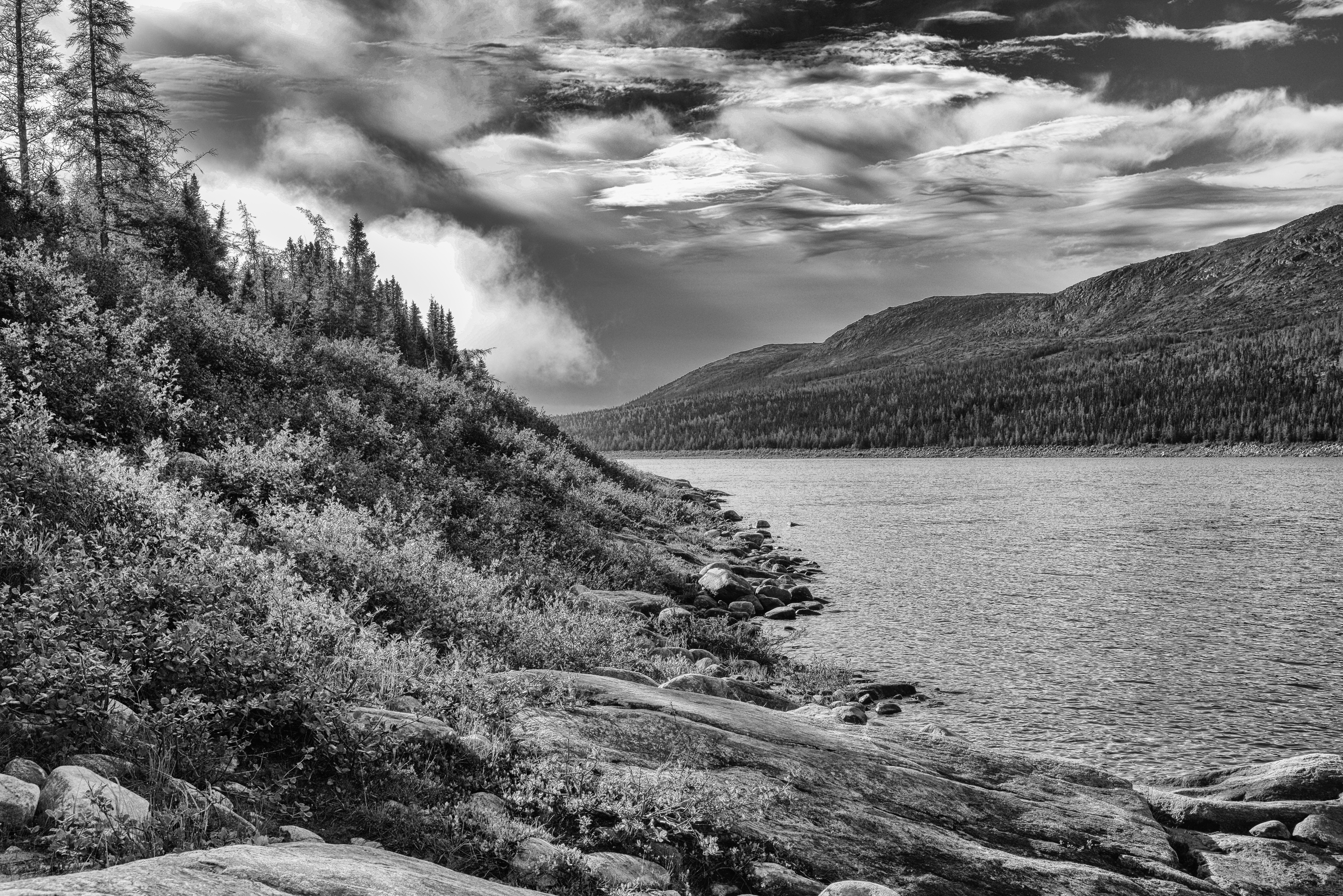
August 2018

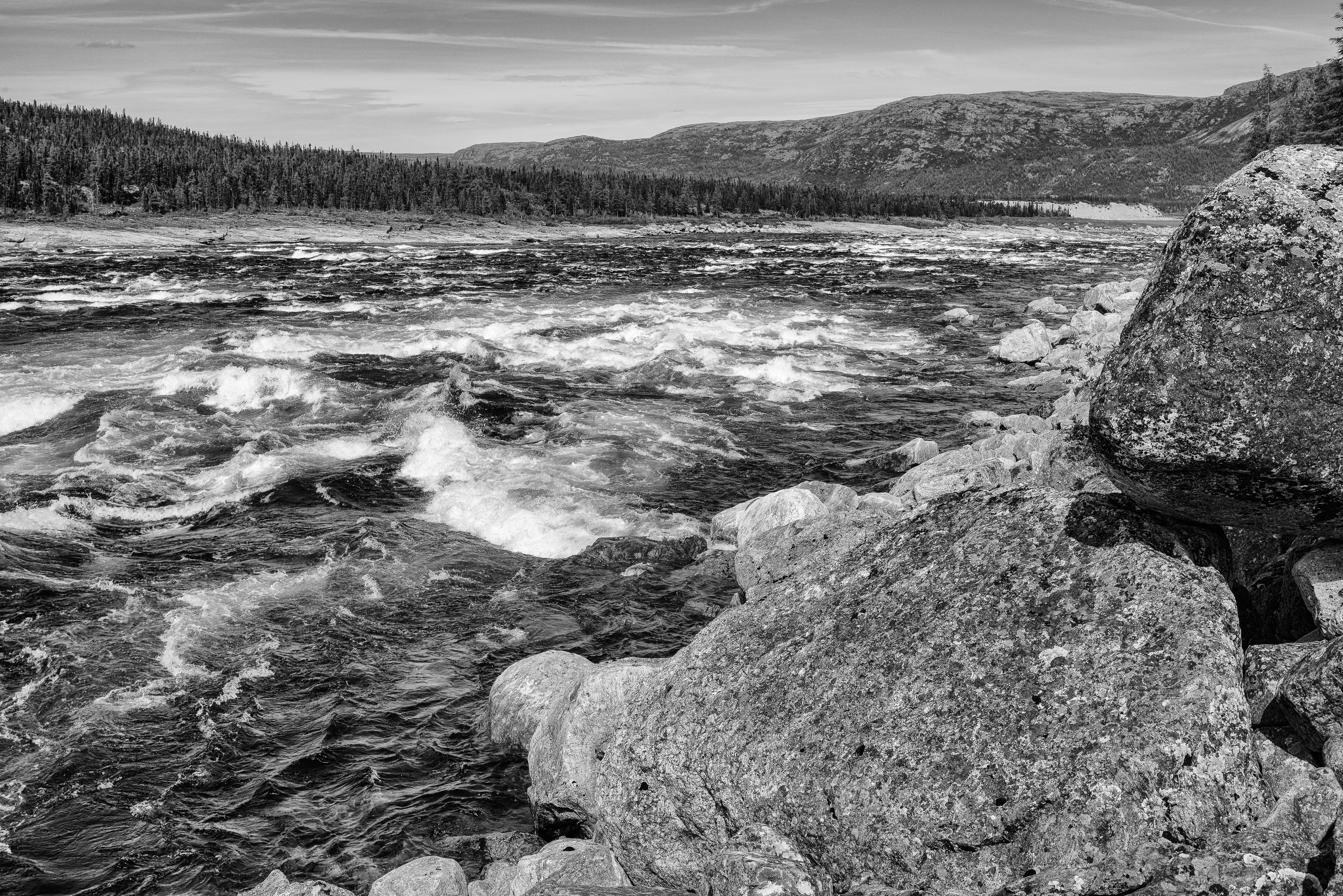
Helen's falls

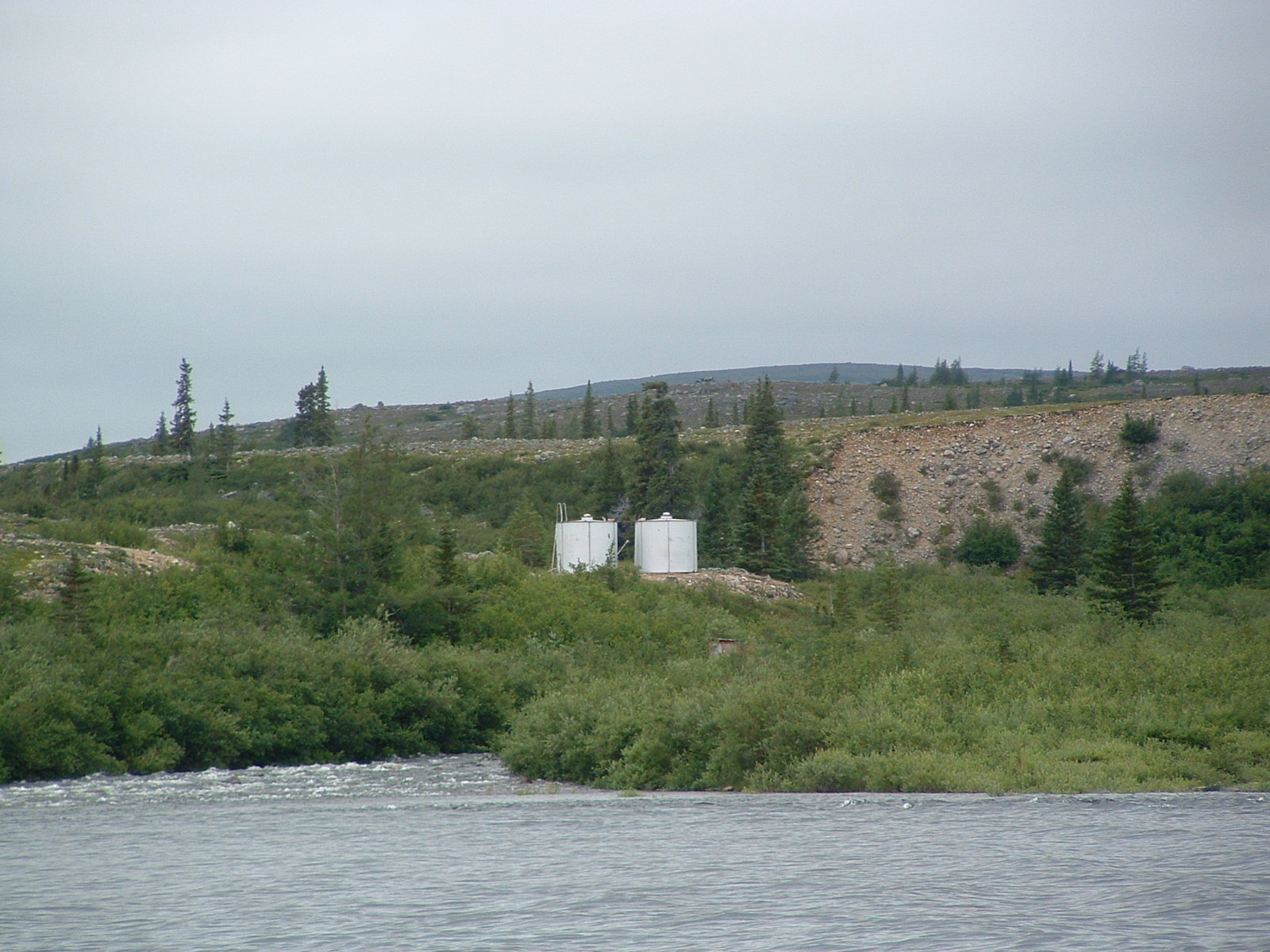
Abandoned US Army weather station on Indian House Lake

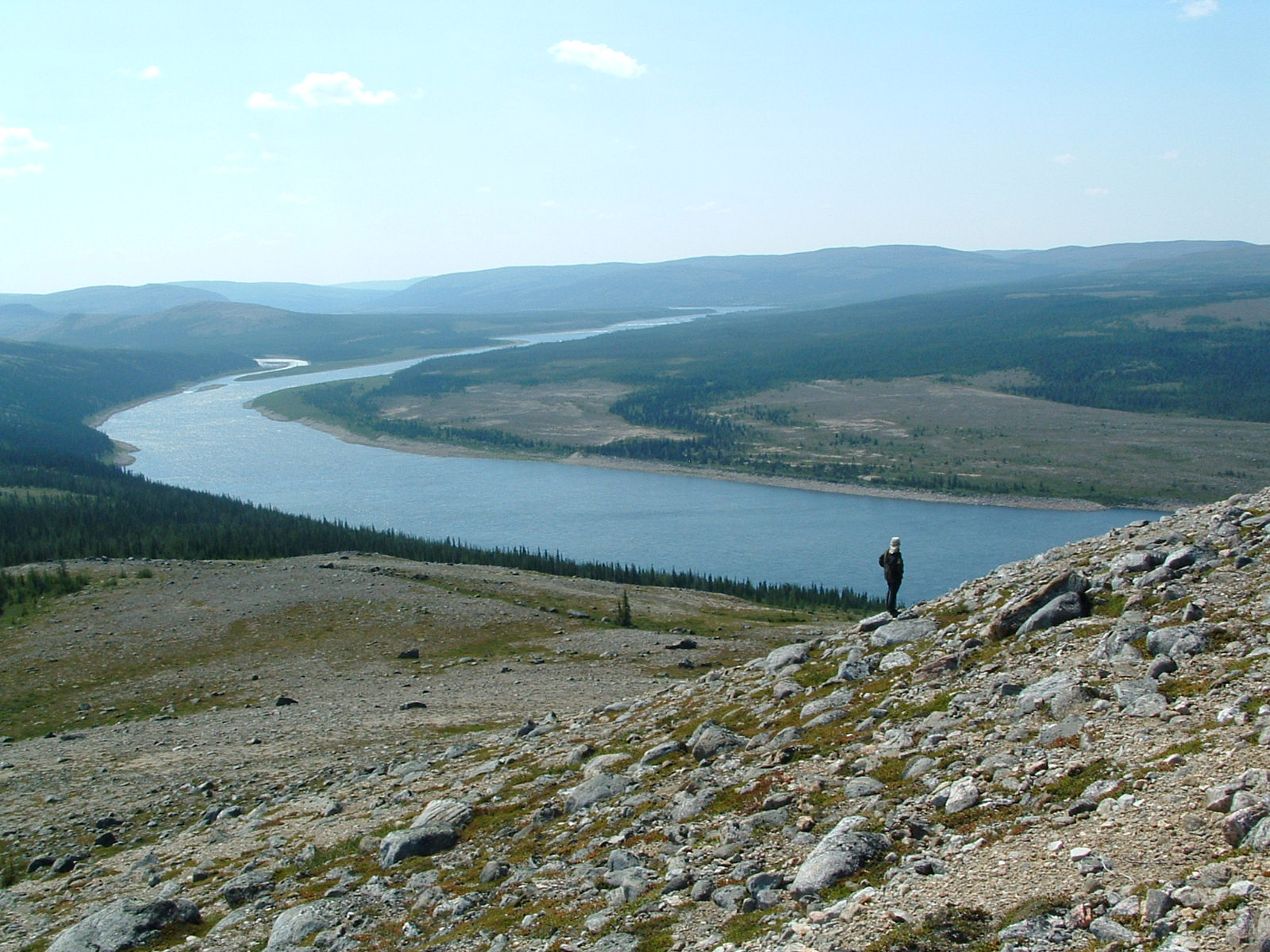
George River

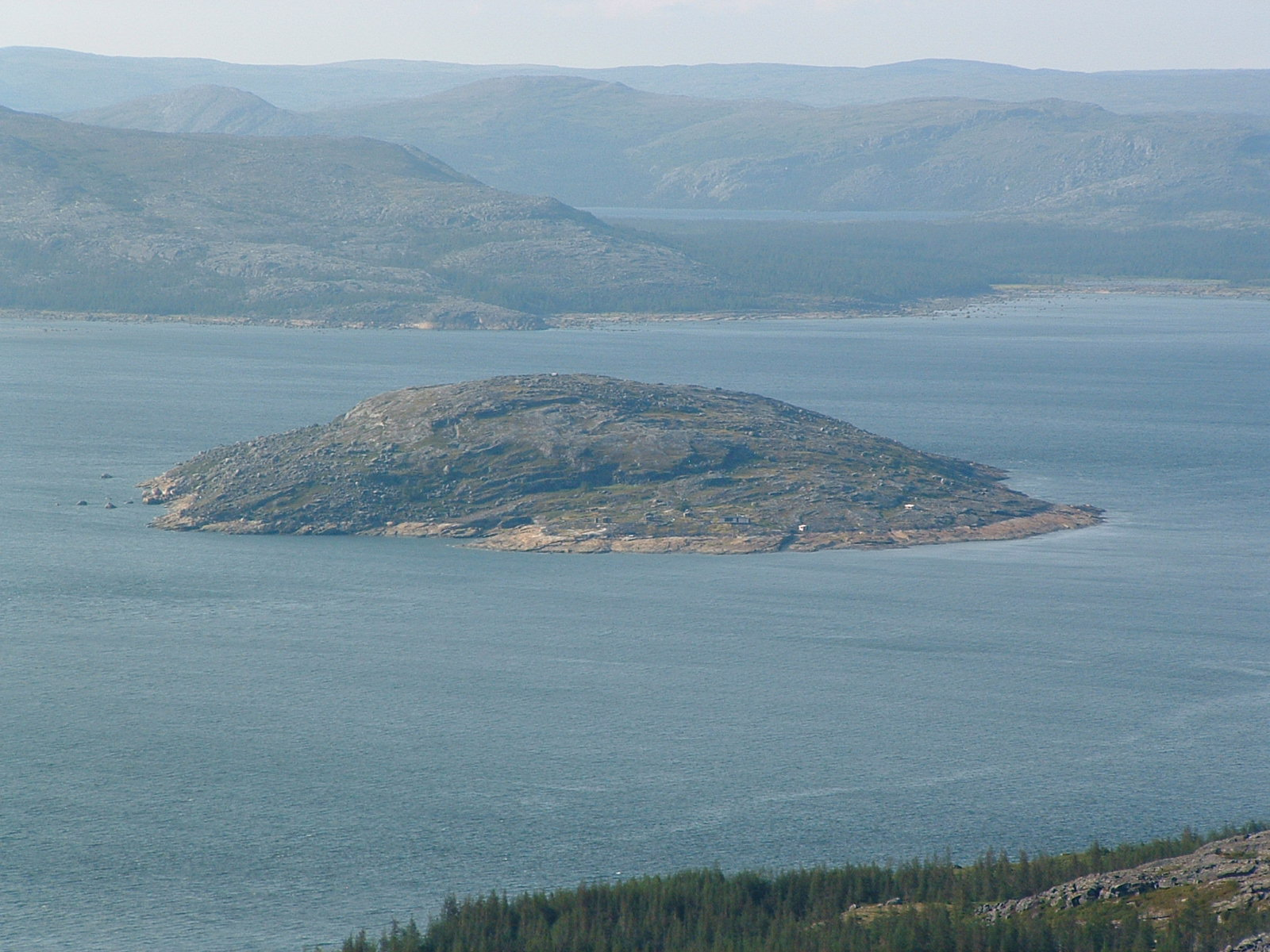
Ford Island
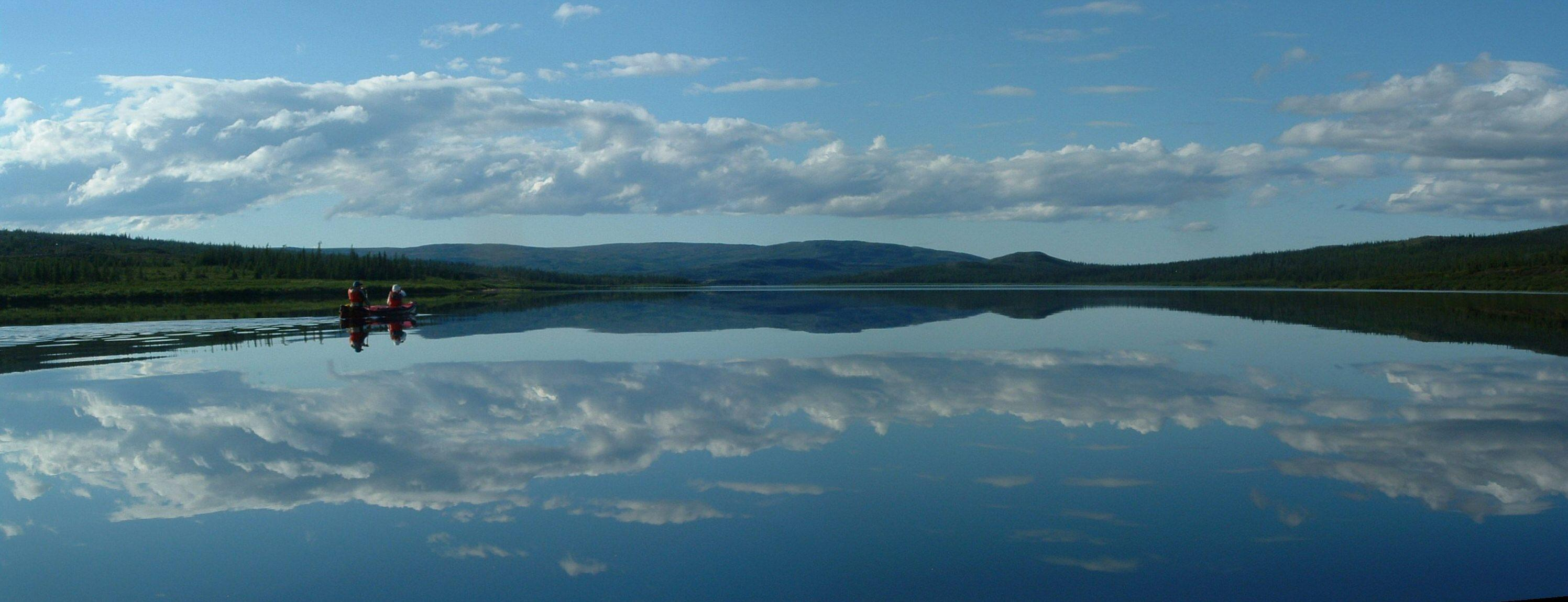
Indian House Lake

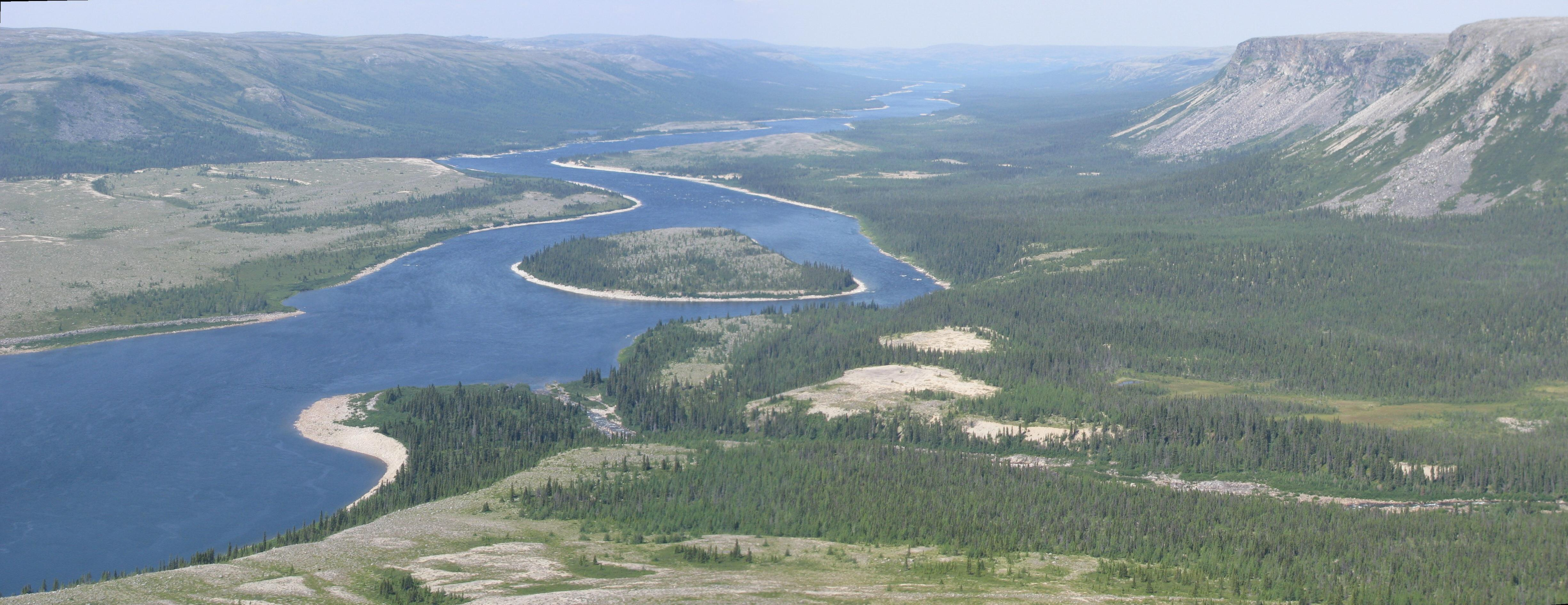
George River

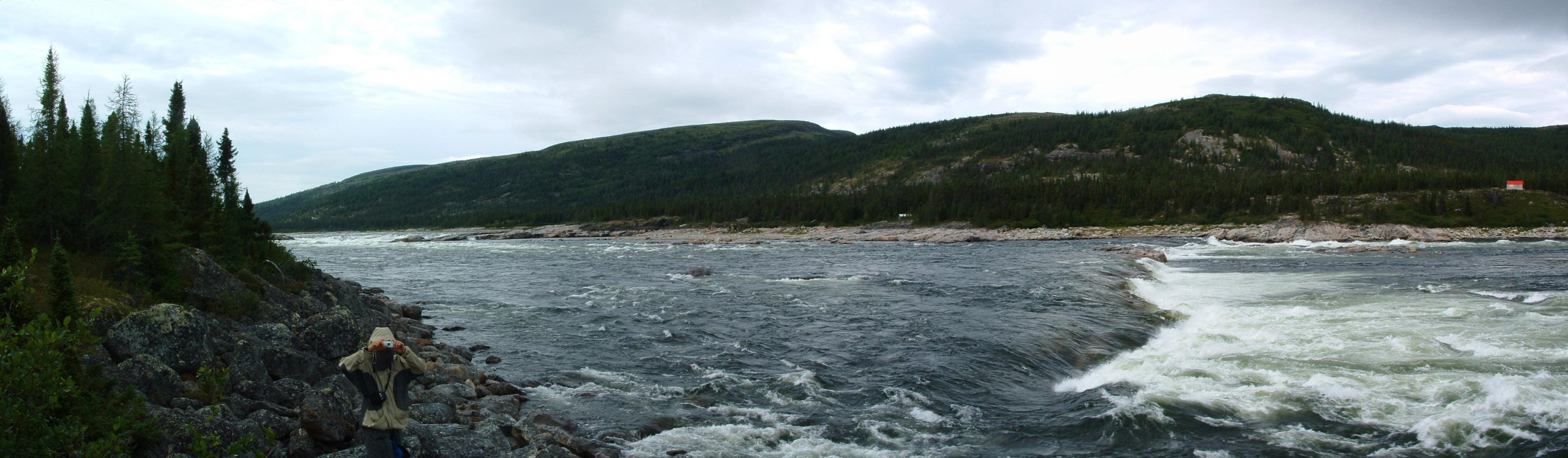
Helen Falls

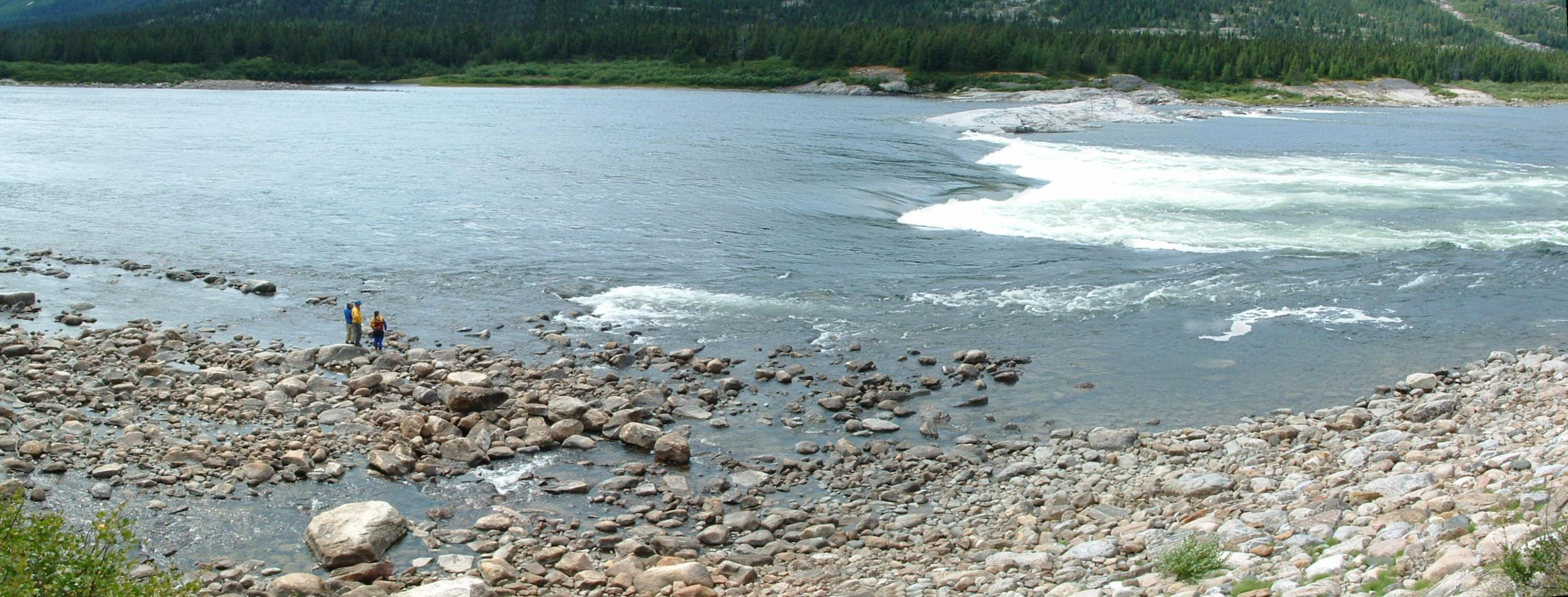
Sarvakallak Rapid

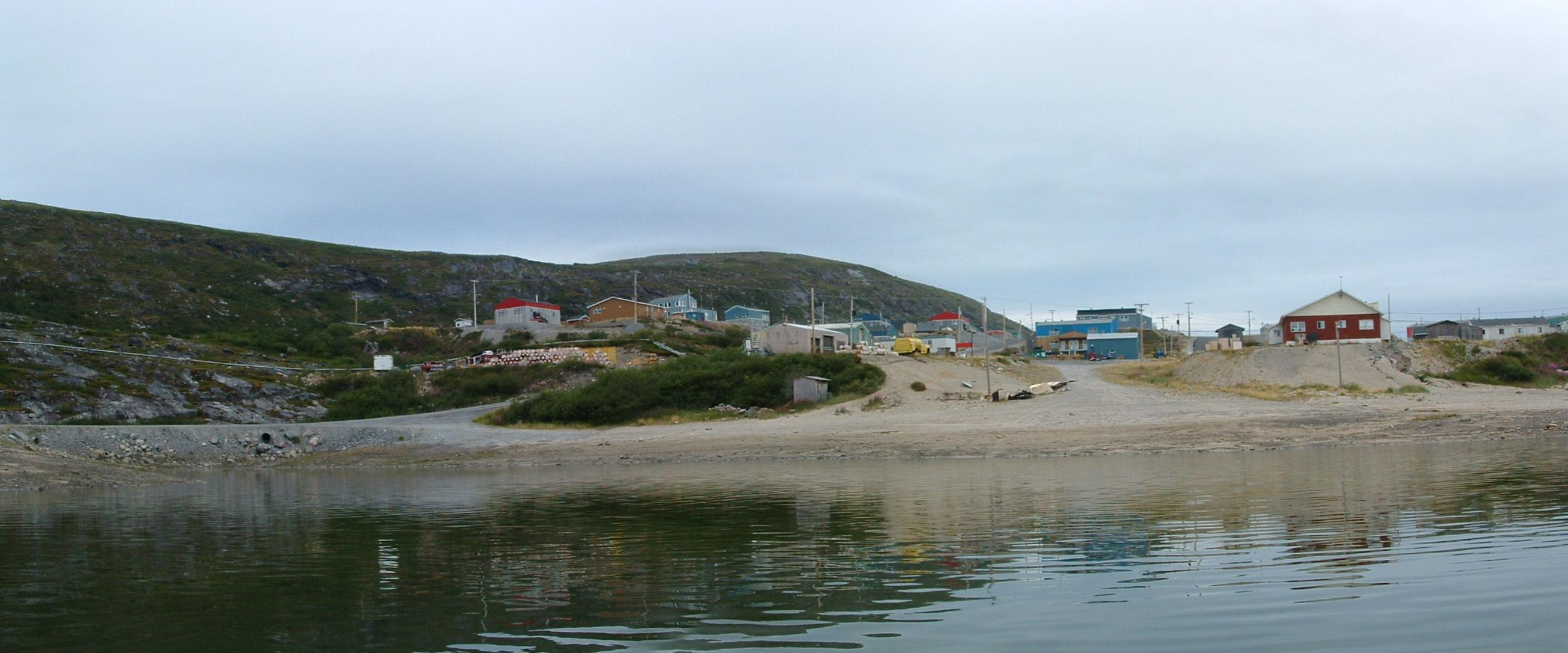
Kangiqsualujjuaq Harbour at high tide
