= John McLean (explorer) =

Scottish explorer of Canada (c. 1799 – 1890)

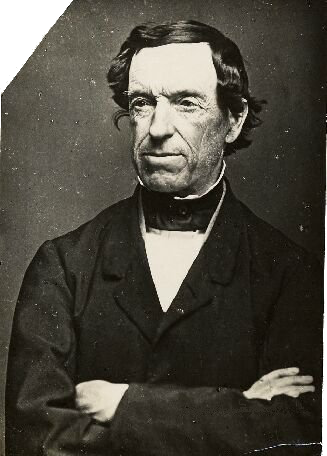
- John McLean (c. 1860)
- Born: c. 1799; Isle of Mull, Scotland, UK
- Died: 8 September 1890 (aged 90–91); Victoria, British Columbia, Canada
- Occupations: Fur trapper and trader Grocer and bank manager Newspaperman; Court clerk Author
- Known for: 1st crossing of the Labrador Peninsula; 1st sighting of Churchill Falls; Advocacy of Canadian annexation of HBC territory.
- Notable work: Notes of a Twenty-five Years' Service in the Hudson's Bay Territory

John McLean (c. 1799–1890) was a Scotsman who emigrated to British North America, where he became a fur-trapper, trader, explorer, grocer, banker, newspaperman, clerk, and author. He travelled by foot and canoe from the Atlantic to the Pacific and back, becoming one of the chief traders of the Hudson's Bay Company. He is remembered as the first person of European descent to discover Churchill Falls on Canada's Churchill River and sometimes mistakenly credited as the first to cross the Labrador Peninsula. Long overlooked, his first-person accounts of early 19th-century fur trading in Canada are now valued by historians. Under the pen name Viator (Latin for "Traveller"), his letters to newspapers around Canada also helped shift public opinion away from yielding the western territories to the United States during the Alabama Claims dispute over damages for British involvement in the American Civil War.

== Life ==
=== Early life ===
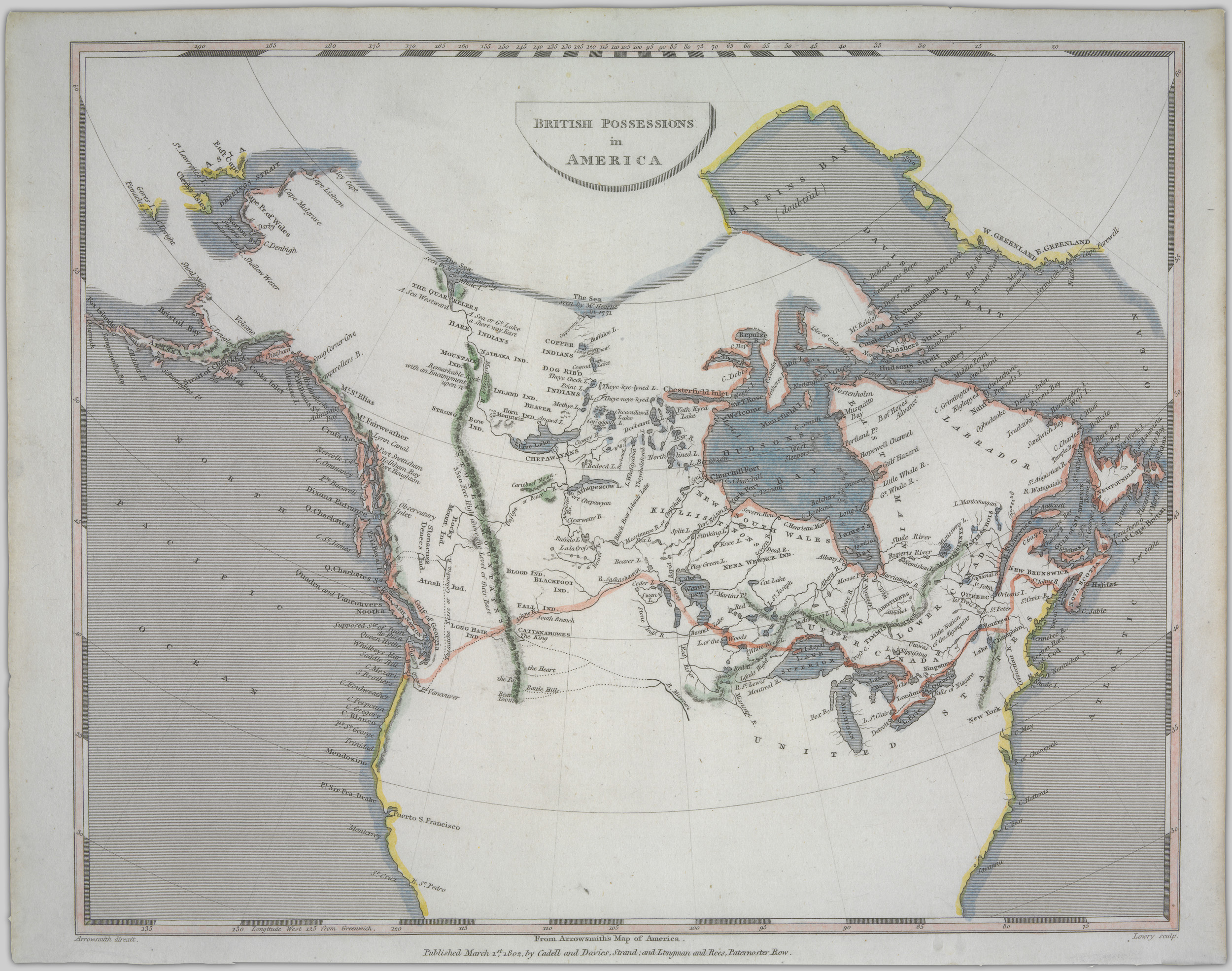
A period map showing the extent of British knowledge of present-day Canada around the time of McLean's birth

John McLean was born in Dervaig or beside the Loch Bà on the Isle of Mull in Britain in 1797, on 24 July 1798, in 1799, or on 14 December 1800.

=== With the North West Company ===
He joined the North West Company in the winter of 1820, reaching Montreal in January 1821. Before leaving for his three-year apprenticeship in May, he studied French for several months with two other trappers under the anglophile curate of St Michel d'Yamaska, Pierre Gibert. (Note: McLean mistakes the name of the parish as "Petit le Maska".) The same year, the NWC merged with its long-time rival the Hudson's Bay Company. McLean's apprenticeship transferred to the new company, but his memoirs show that he never abandoned his preference for the old one: "From 1674 to 1813 the Hudson's Bay Company slumbered at its posts along the shores of Hudson's Bay, never attempting to penetrate beyond the banks of the Saskatchewan, until the North-Westers led and cleared the way"... "the chief advantages the Hudson's Bay Company now possess, they owe to the adventurous North-West traders; by these traders the whole interior of the savage wilds was first explored; by them the water communications were first discovered and opened up to commercial enterprise; by them the first trading posts were established in the interior; by them the natives were first reconciled with the whites; and by them the trade was first reduced to the regular system which the Hudson's Bay Company still follows. When all this had been done by the North-West Company, and they had begun to reap the rewards of their toils, and hardships, and dangers, and expenditure,—then did the Honourable Hudson's Bay Company, led on by a British peer, step forward and claim, as British subjects, an equal right to share the trade."

=== With the Hudson's Bay Company ===
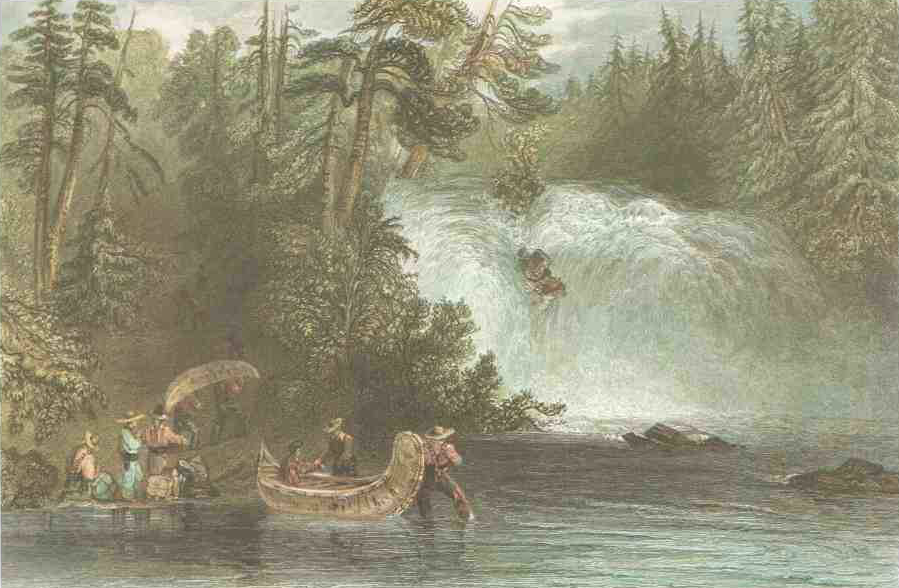
An engraving of Chats Falls, c. 1840

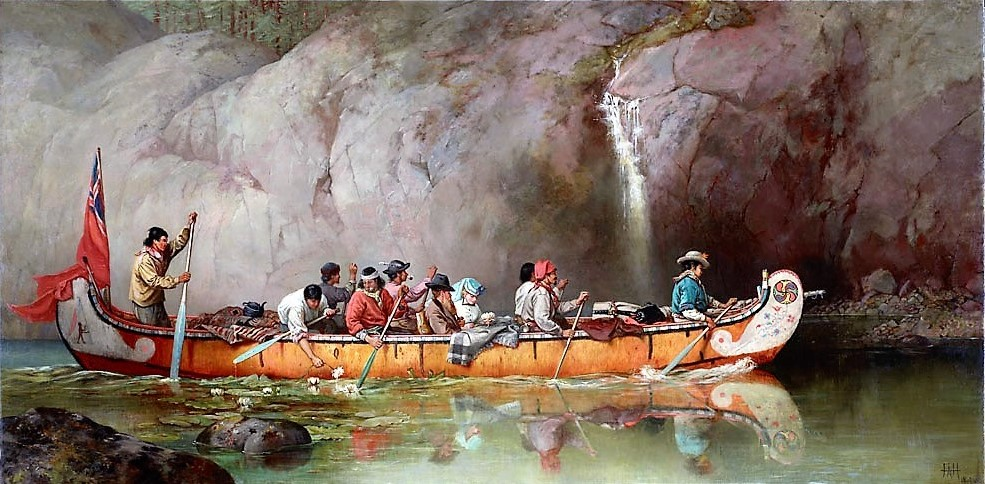
F.A. Hopkins's portrayal of an HBC freight canoe (1869)

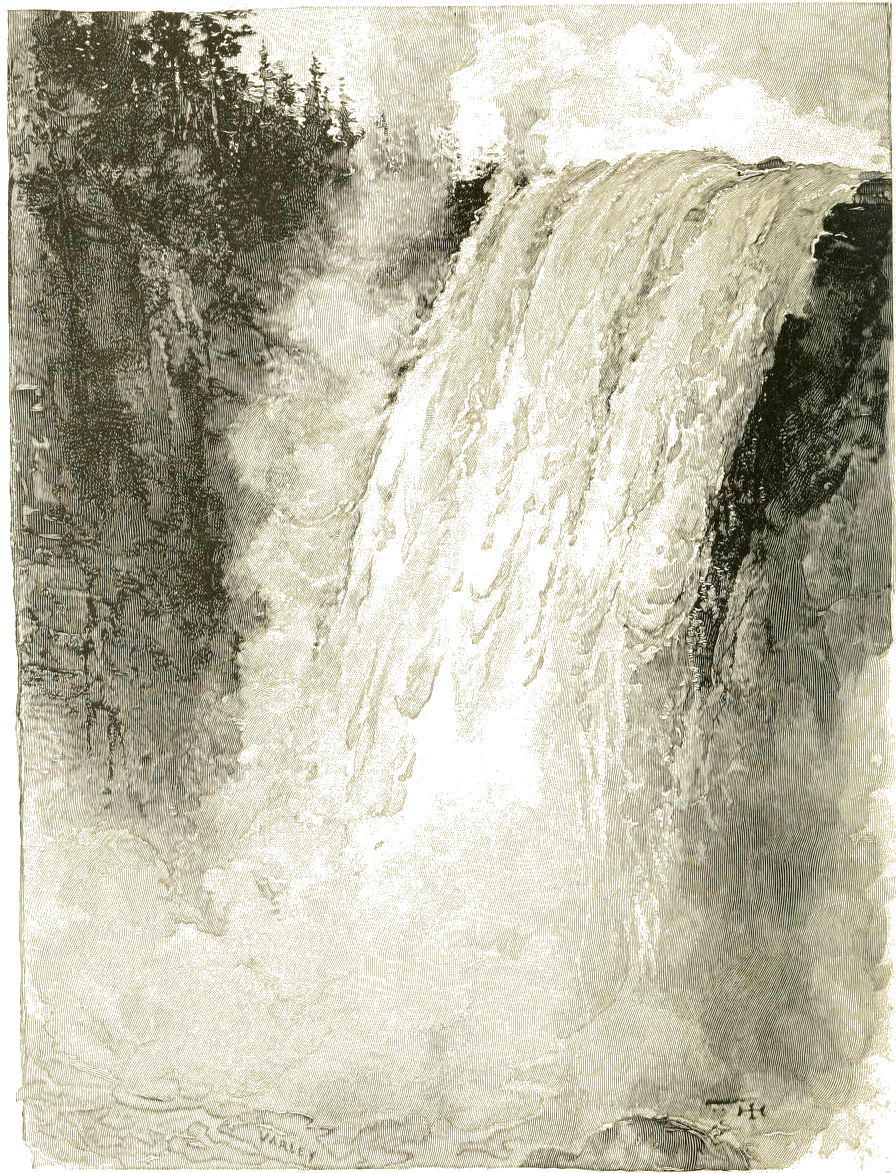
An engraving of Churchill Falls, c. 1890

I have neither seen, read, nor heard of any locality under heaven that can offer a more cheerless abode to civilized man than Ungava. The rumbling noise created by the ice, when driven to and fro by the force of the tide, continually stuns the ear; while the light of heaven is hidden by the fog that hangs in the air, shrouding everything in the gloom of a dark twilight. If Pluto should leave his own gloomy mansion in tenebris tartari, he might take up his abode here, and gain or lose but little by the exchange.

"	The parched ground burns frore, and cold performs
	The effect of fire."—Milton.

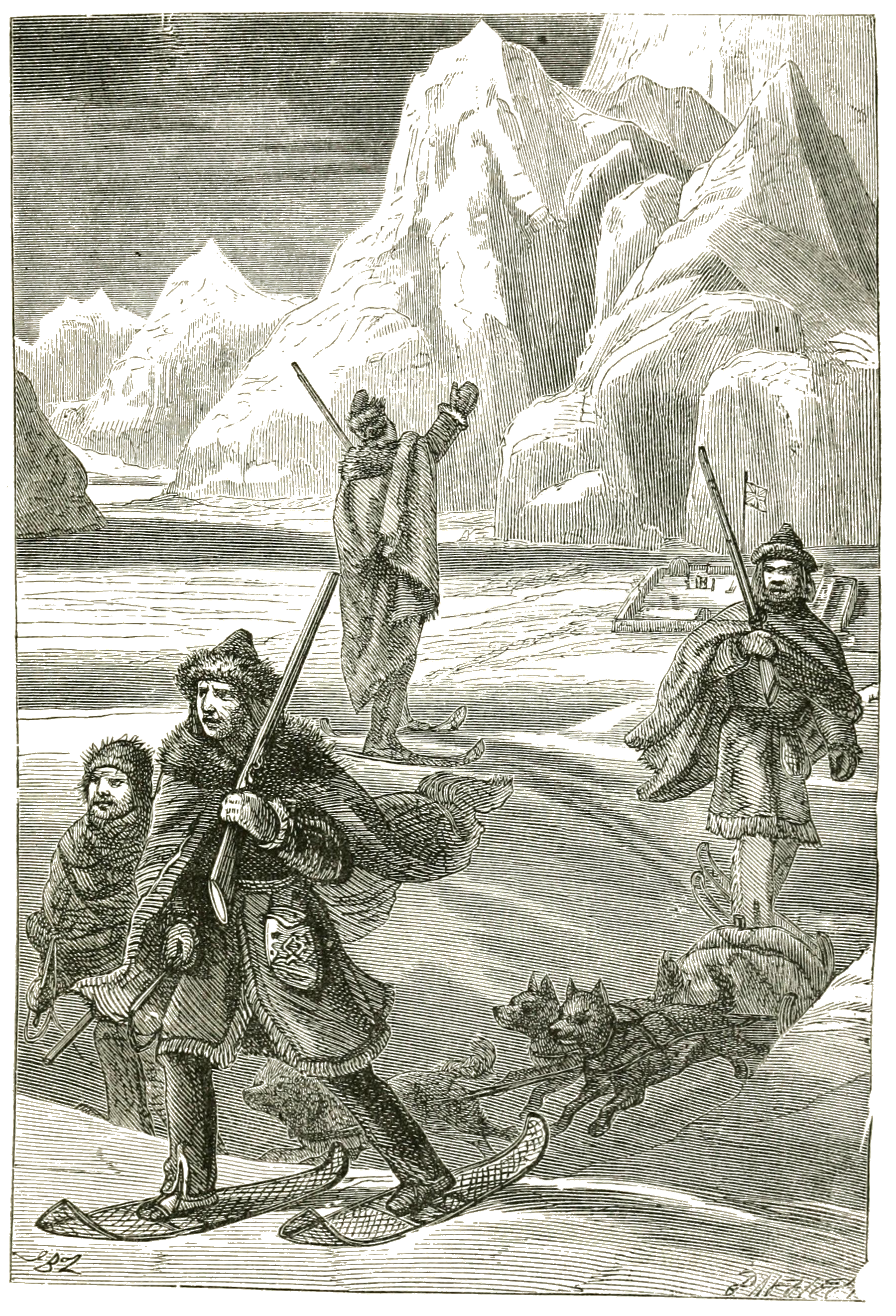
An illustration of the HBC men from Ungava, Ballantyne's fictionalized portrayal of life at Fort Chimo

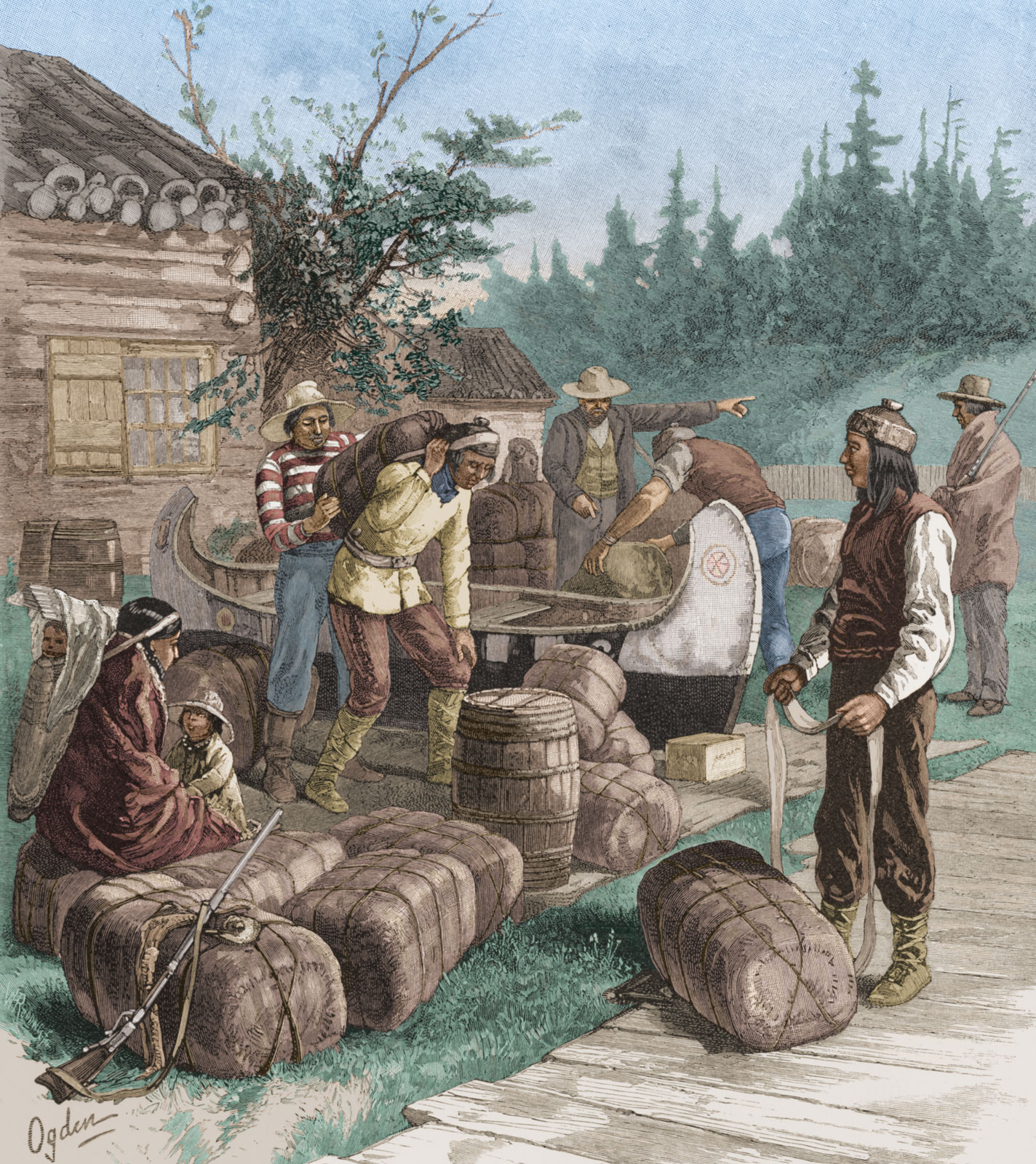
An engraving of an HBC station, c. 1880

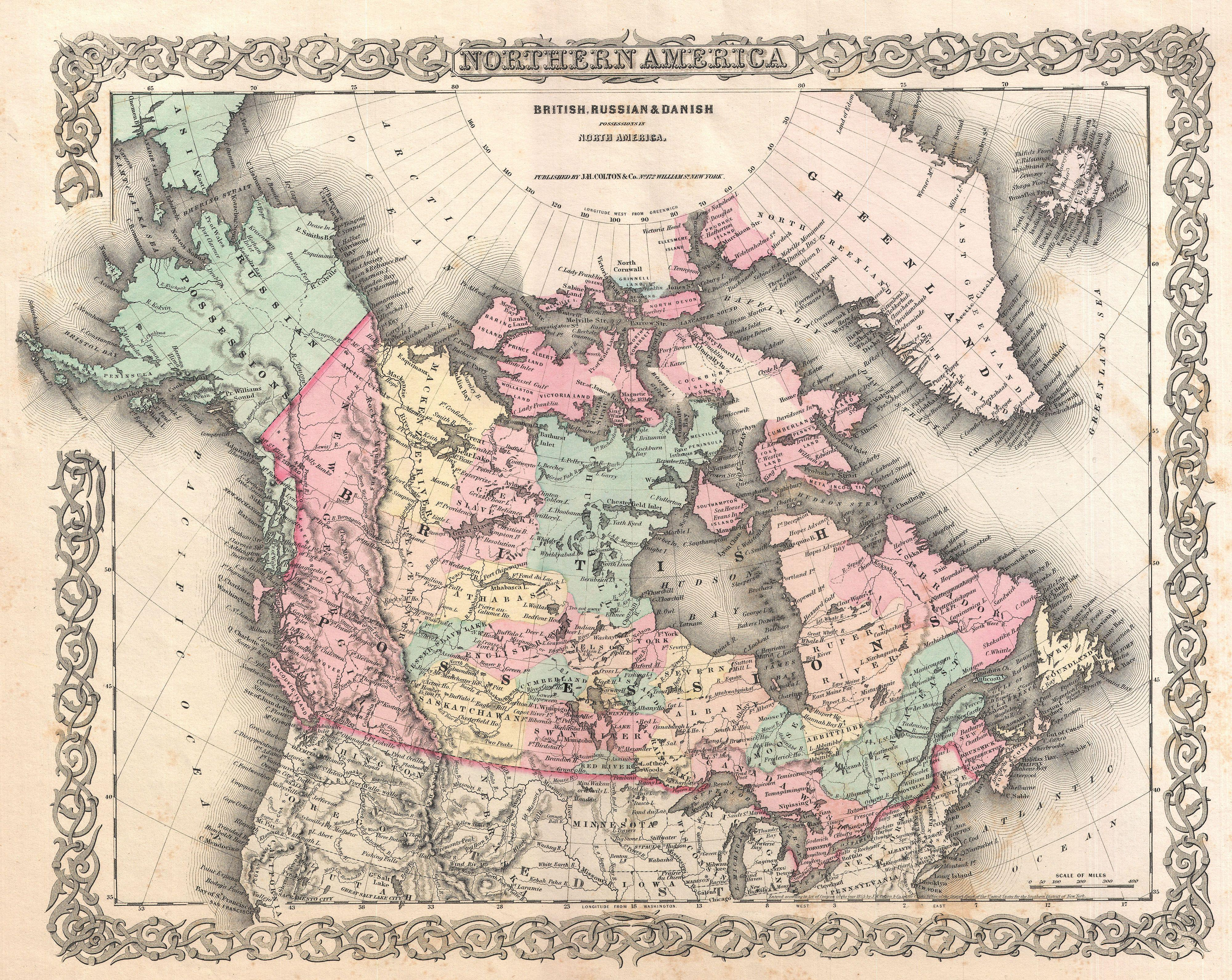
A period map showing the extent of British knowledge of present-day Canada around the time of McLean's retirement

==== Ottawa River ====
John McLean entered the service of the Hudson's Bay Company at a most interesting and critical time in its history, during the strife between the Hudson's Bay and North West Companies. He worked on the Ottawa River—the present-day border between Quebec and Ontario—until 1833. During his apprenticeship, he moved progressively further upcountry, from Lake of Two Mountains, to Chats Falls in April 1822, to Fort Coulonge in June 1823. He then directed a post at Lac de Sable on the Lièvre in the wilderness north of Ottawa and Montreal. He spent nine years fending off company rivals, cultivating relations with indigenous trappers, and improving the post's profitability only to be removed to a new territory once things had become easy. He lamented that he "had now served the Hudson's Bay Company faithfully and zealously for a period of twelve years, leading a life of hardship and toil, of which no idea can be formed except by those whose hard lot it may be to know it by experience... what was my reward? I had no sooner succeeded in freeing my district from opposition, than I was ordered to resign my situation to another who would enjoy the results of my labour." McLean's account of his journey across the continent is another of those invaluable accounts that enable us to piece together the history of the Canadian North-west in its earlier days.

==== New Caledonia ====
Ordered to the Western Department on the Pacific, he travelled—mostly by canoe—from Montreal up the Ottawa, crossed Lake Nipissing to the French River and the sheltered northern bays of Lake Huron, passed Sault Ste Marie into Lake Superior and Fort William on Thunder Bay, stopped on the north shore of Lake Winnipeg at Norway House in Rupert's Land (now Manitoba) for further orders, and finally followed them—past Cumberland House in present-day Saskatchewan and Athabasca and Fort Dunvegan in present-day Alberta and down the Peace River—to New Caledonia (present-day British Columbia), where he expected "to fare like a dog". Reaching Fort St James on Stuart Lake on 28 October 1833, however, he had nothing but praise—"I do not know that I have seen anything to compare with this charming prospect in any other part of the country; its beauties struck me even at this season of the year, when nature having partially assumed her hybernal dress, everything appeared to so much greater advantage." He also complemented Fort Alexandria on the Fraser, his post from March to May the next year, for its scenery, friendly indigenous neighbours, and good food. In September 1834 or 1835, he went to Prince George, then known as Fort George, whose former trader's servants had all been massacred by the locals a few years earlier but which McLean reported as peaceable and prosperous during his time there.

Having received permission from the governor of the Hudson's Bay Company to return to headquarters, (Note: Wells claims McLean was ordered to return.) McLean departed Stuart Lake on 22 February 1837. He passed Fort Alexandria on 8 March, Kamloops on 18 March, Onkanagan on 28 March, and Colville on 12 April. Reaching Norway House in June, he found Governor George Simpson holding the council for the company's Northern Department. McLean, although eligible, was passed over for promotion to chief trader in favour of two other agents. He took this as a personal slight from Gov. Simpson, but Simpson's personal records seem to be complimentary and indicate he was simply following seniority. While at Norway House, McLean married the Métis Margaret Charles; they had one child together, John McLean Junior, before she died the following year. He reached the company headquarters at York Factory in July, eventually receiving instructions to replace Erland Erlandson as the factor of the Ungava District, recently established based on the praise of the area by the Moravian missionaries Kohlmeister and Kmoch following their 1811 visit.

==== Ungava Bay ====
At his base at Fort Chimo (present-day Kuujjuaq, Quebec) 40 km (25 mi) up the South River (present-day Koksoak River) from South (Ungava) Bay, McLean was only contacted and resupplied from the outside world by brig once a year. "Surrounded by a country that presents as complete a picture of desolation as can be imagined", he avoided lingering there and instead personally led expeditions southeast across the Labrador Peninsula in an attempt to establish overland contact with Fort Smith (present-day North West River, Labrador) at the mouth of the Naskaupi River on Lake Melville, the furthest extent of Esquimaux Bay (now Hamilton Inlet). He expected discovering such a route would lead to his promotion within the company, and his predecessor Erlandson had already accidentally demonstrated its feasibility in 1834 when his attempt to reach Mingan on the St Lawrence had been redirected to Lake Melville by his five Innu guides. (Note: McLean is sometimes (but mistakenly) credited as the first European to have crossed the entire peninsula. He himself credited Erlandson's earlier trek, which had lasted from 6 April to 22 June 1834.) On 2 January 1838, he and his men headed out on dogsleds to take a route up the Koksoak from Erlandson's maps and reports, following the Caniapiscau and Swampy Bay Rivers to Lake Michikamau and the Naskaupi, reaching Fort Smith on 16 February, having taken 46 days to cover 858 km (533 mi). On the way back, their guides fell sick with severe flu and became delirious with fever; game became scarce; and McLean divided his party, taking few provisions and running ahead with a clerk to send supplies back to the rest. Meeting no food on the way, one sled dog starved to death and the two were obliged to eat the other—"what we considered, in present circumstances, 'food for the gods'"—to make it back to Fort Chimo. The first party sent south from the fort returned with only one of the missing men, and McLean was obliged to send a second group who returned with the rest of them on 26 April. Having established that the known routes to Hamilton Inlet were impractical, he learned from the locals about the George River to the east. He founded Fort Siveright (present-day Kangiqsualujjuaq) on the eastern shore of its mouth to serve as a salmon and seal fishery. He sent a team under Erlandson to Indian Head Lake to establish Fort Trial as a waystation and depot for the supply route to for outposts further south.

After the Koksoak cleared of ice on 25 June 1839, McLean travelled up Ungava Bay to the George River, which they followed despite its low water until its head of navigation. They then passed overland to where Erlandson had established Fort Nascopie on Petitsikapau Lake. Attempting to complete the route without Innu guides, they got lost and reached the upper Churchill, discovering the Grand Falls (now Churchill Falls). McLean considered it "stupendous" and "one of the grandest spectacles in the world", although a hydroelectric project subsequently almost eliminated its flow after 1970. Compelled to return, they reached Fort Chimo on 20 September.

He attempted a different route the next year, while William Henry Allen Davies of the company's Esquimaux Bay District led an expedition up the Churchill from Fort Smith. Realizing that Davies had reached almost as far as Churchill Falls, McLean was able to use his report and friendly advice from indigenous locals to find a route up the George, through a series of lakes around the falls, and along the Naskaupi to Lake Melville in 1841. The company immediately adopted this final route and promoted McLean to chief trader. (Further exploration from Fort Smith eventually showed that the route sought by Finlayson and Erlandson leading directly from Ungava Bay to the St Lawrence was completely impracticable, the forests southwest of Lake Melville being too boggy for travel and their lakes too shallow for the large trading canoes used by the HBC.)

Although a more efficient route had now been established, the Hudson's Bay Company still found the Ungava District unprofitable and Gov. Simpson ordered that its ships be sent only every other year. The company opted against giving the district a proper cartographer and contented itself with rough sketch maps, like that compiled under McLean's direction in 1840. McLean's inland route continued to be used, but to supply Fort Nascopie from the south. Feeling isolated and abandoned, McLean took the first furlough in his career, leaving Fort Chimo in 1842 to visit his mother in Scotland, passing York Factory, New York, and Montreal on his route. The forts he had established were abandoned. The entire Ungava District was eliminated in 1843, while from May to June McLean led a team including a royal magnetic survey under John Henry Lefroy from Lachine (in present-day Quebec) to Norway House. Lefroy reported him "a person of intelligence and information beyond what one might expect from a man who has all his life been scraping beaver skins together at remote stations" and complimented his flute playing.

==== Mackenzie River ====
The poor conditions at Fort Chimo had so damaged McLean's health that he threatened Governor Simpson with his resignation if he were appointed to "a second Ungava". With the company refusing to buy back his stock, however, he was forced to remain working and was sent to Fort Simpson (in the present-day Northwest Territories) on the Mackenzie above the Great Slave Lake. He headed the Mackenzie River District from there until June 1844, when Gov. Simpson informed him that he had been only an acting director, that the more senior agent Murdoch McPherson would be assuming permanent command of the district, and that McLean would be obliged to serve under him as a deputy. After a fruitless two years of appeal to the company's governor and board in London, he retired on 1 June 1846. (Note: Boyle and the Archives of Manitoba give the date of McLean's resignation as effective during the fall of 1845. Sanagan gives 1 June 1846, as the date of McLean's failure to be promoted.) After twenty-five years spent almost continually in the fur-trade, McLean quit the service of the Hudson's Bay Company. Gov. Simpson denied his request for a pension.

=== Later life ===
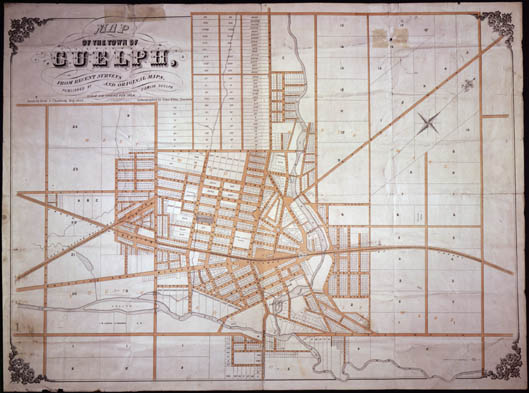
A map of Guelph during McLean's time there

He had married Clarissa Eugenia Evans, daughter of the missionary and linguist James Evans, in 1845 or 1846 and settled with her in Guelph, Canada West (in present-day Ontario). He built for himself a stone house in Guelph in 1847, which is still standing, at No. 21 Nottingham Street. While there, he managed a grocery store on Market Square for four years, wrote his memoirs, and sired five children. (Two died in infancy, leaving his son Archibald and Eugenia and another daughter to succeed him.) (Note: Boyle claims that the family consisted of three girls and one boy, all of whom lived to adulthood.) He opened and managed a branch office of the Bank of Montreal from his house and hired his old companion Erlandson to work there. He helped set up the Guelph Herald, a Conservative newspaper. He was well-read in English, French, and Gaelic and could speak several of the major languages of Canada's indigenous peoples, such that the native traders who visited the town "invariably" called upon him. He became an important member of the town and in 1856 laid the cornerstone for the Norfolk Street Wesleyan Methodist Church (the present Lakeside Hope House).

By then, however, his financial position had been ruined when he was obliged to repay £1300 stolen from the bank in two incidents in September 1855. (McLean's wife and historians have tended to finger Erlandson for the theft as he left an unexpectedly large estate at his death, but at the time McLean supported his friend and employee and accepted responsibility for the loss.) With what he had left, he moved to nearby Elora, where he served as court clerk for the next 25 years. His wife died 6 May 1858, at the age of 32. For some years his mother-in-law, Mrs. Evans, lived with him, and cared for his children.

Following the American Civil War, when Britain had assisted the Confederacy with blockade running and commerce raiding because of its textile mills' reliance on American cotton, the victorious United States had cancelled its Canadian free trade agreement and demanded enormous reparations. For a time, American expansionists, Canadian separatists, and British anti-imperialists all seemed to support the transfer of the western wilderness of British North America rather than resolving the issue monetarily. It was largely unpopulated and the Hudson's Bay Company had long portrayed it as frozen wastes useless for settlement, mostly to dissuade competitors and the encroachment of farmers and civilization into its trapping grounds. Alarmed by this possibility and unwilling to accept the territories' loss to the Americans (inter alia, he considered the War of 1812 to have been an act of unprovoked aggression), (Note: McLean considered himself "without any prejudice against the Americans" and elsewhere allows that, "possessed of the same noble spirit that procured for their English progenitors the confirmation of Magna Charta,... the heroes of the American revolution nobly fought and conquered" and that American English "is elegance itself, compared to the provincial dialects of Britain, or even to the vile slang one hears in the streets of London".) he wrote to newspapers across Canada under the name "Viator", vividly detailing the beauty and resources of the Canadian west and advocating the purchase of Rupert's Land from the Hudson's Bay Company. His letters to his hometown Elora Lightning Express were reworked into a short book under the name Remarks on the Great Nor'-West. His accounts have been credited with shifting Canadian public opinion against the land transfer, increasing political pressure to find a separate resolution to the dispute. (In the end, the HBC surrendered Rupert's Land to the British Crown, which granted it to the Canadian Confederation; the Confederation assumed British Columbia's debts and promised a transcontinental railroad to secure its consent to admission; and Britain paid off the United States with $15.5 million, more than twice what the US had spent on the Alaska Purchase.)

McLean left Elora in 1883 for Victoria, British Columbia. After revealing his identity as "Viator" in 1889, he died there at the home of his youngest daughter Eugenia O'Brian on 8 March or 8 September 1890. John McLean was buried in the Presbyterian Plot in Ross Bay Cemetery.

== Works ==
- Notes of a Twenty-five Years' Service in the Hudson's Bay Territory, London: Richard Bentley, 1849, considered a major source on Canada's fur trade. 2nd ed. in 1932 edited by W.S. Wallace as John McLean's Notes of a Twenty-Five Years' Service in the Hudson's Bay Territory, Toronto: Champlain Society. volume I & volume II
- Remarks on the Great Nor'-West, Elora: J.M. Shaw, 1869, first published as articles for the Elora Lightning Express.

== Legacy ==
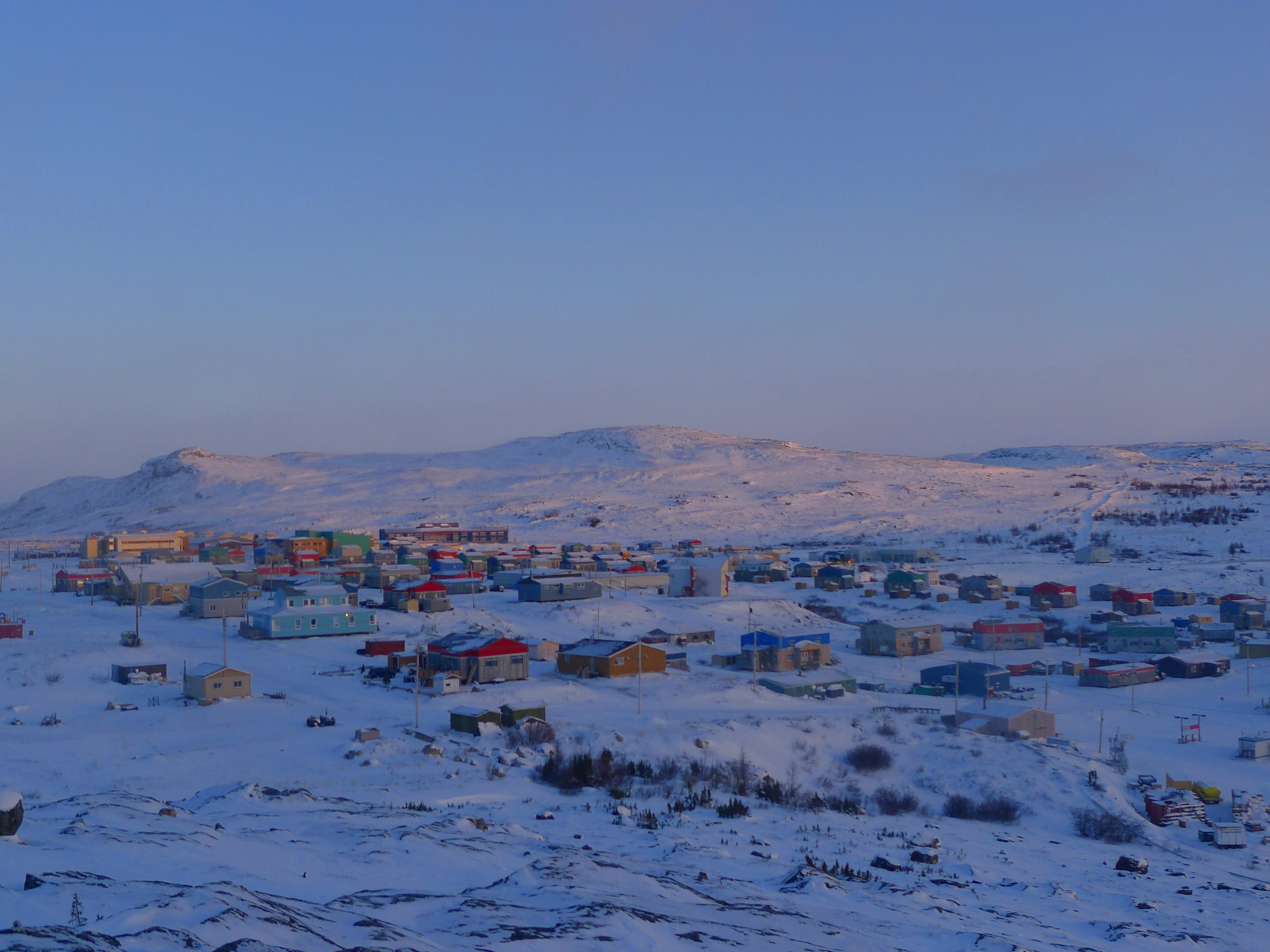
Kangiqsualujjuaq (2011)

McLean was the inspiration for one of the characters in R.M. Ballantyne's Ungava, a fictionalized retelling of that station's establishment and operation. He was briefly the namesake of what is now Churchill Falls. After fitful returns and abandonments, the fort he established at the mouth of the George River in 1838 eventually became the permanent settlement of Kangiqsualujjuaq.

Following inquiries by Hugh Templin of the Fergus News-Record, a plaque commemorating McLean—including the mistaken belief that he was the first to cross the Labrador Peninsula—was erected at 21 Nottingham Street, Guelph, Ontario, by the former Ontario Archaeological and Historic Sites Board. The building had been McLean's residence in Guelph between 1847 and 1857.
