= Lobstick Lake =

- Location within Newfoundland and Labrador
- Location: Labrador, Newfoundland and Labrador, Canada
- Coordinates: 54°N 65°W
- Type: reservoir
- Basin countries: Canada

Lobstick Lake is the western section of the Smallwood Reservoir, in western Labrador, Canada. Once its own lake, it was merged with Michikamau Lake after Churchill River was impounded as a result of the completion of the Churchill Falls Generating Station in 1971.

== Geography ==
Lobstick Lake lies directly to the southwest of Michikamau Lake and just north of Ossokmanuan Lake.

The nearest settlement is Churchill Falls.

== Fishing ==
The Lobstick Lake has a large population of lake trout. Fishermen and anglers frequently catch fish weighing five pounds, with some captured specimens being over 40 pounds. The fishing season on the lake lasts throughout the year, but the best season for fishing are late spring and early summer. The area near the Churchill Falls Generating Station is reported to be the best fishing spot.

== Effects of flooding ==
Prior to the impoundment of the Churchill River, the subsequent flooding and creation of the Smallwood Reservoir, Lobstick Lake and Michikamau Lake had very different characteristics. Michikamau Lake was deep, over 100 m (330 ft) in some areas, and had transparent waters drained from the forest tundra and barren lands in its basin, whereas Lobstick Lake in depth and acidic waters with humic substances from the muskegs in its basin. After the creation of the reservoir the colour difference between the two lakes was balanced out. pH, alkalinity and nitrate levels in both lakes went up. The flooding also had an effect on the microfauna of Lobstick Lake, with Cyclops scutifer being replaced by Mesocyclops edax as main predator.

A different between the two lakes left unaffected by their merger is depth, with Michikamau Lake having some areas that were over 100 m (330 ft) prior to the creation of the reservoir whereas Lobstick Lake had extensive regions where depths were less than 20 m (66 ft).

== Gallery ==
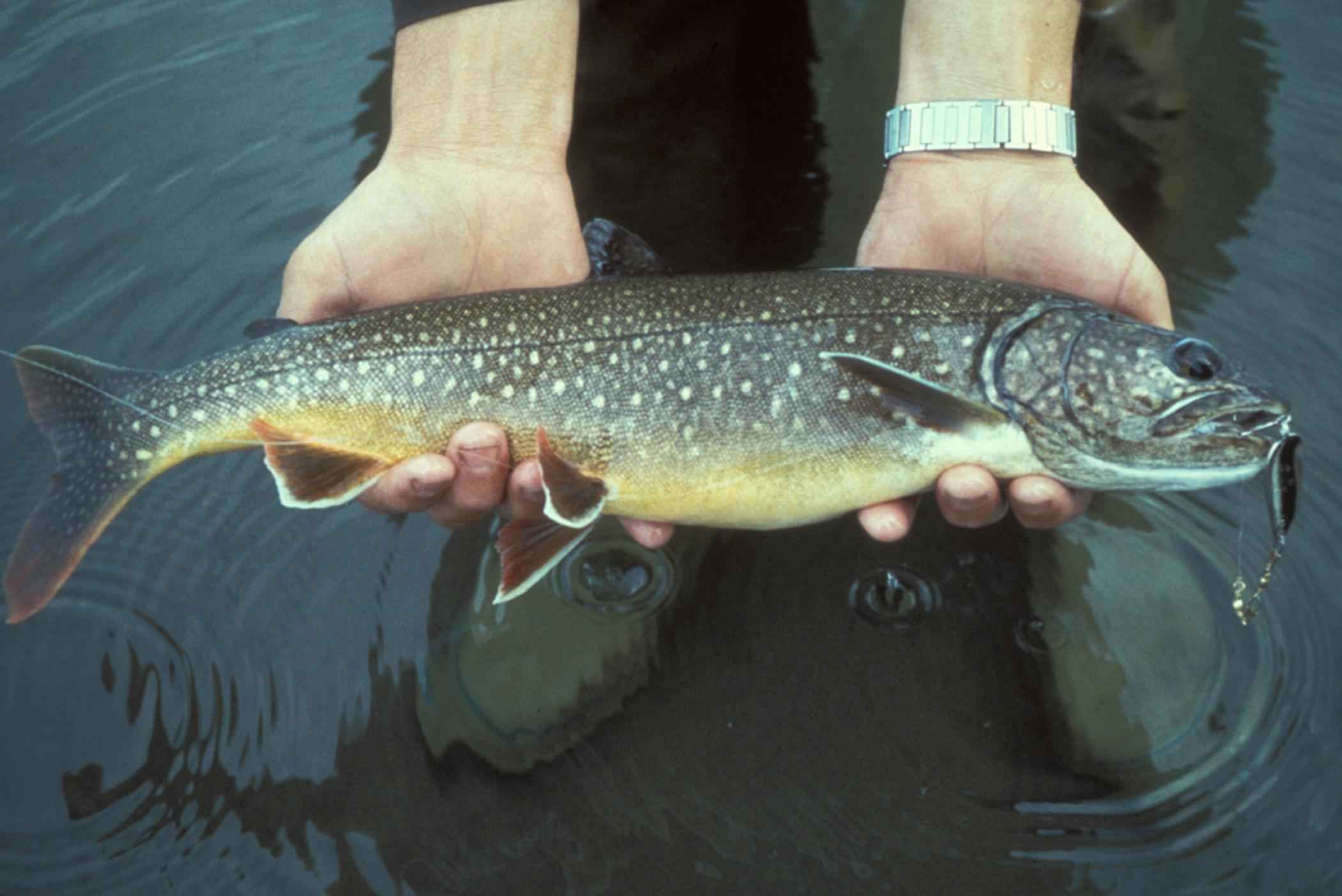
A lake trout

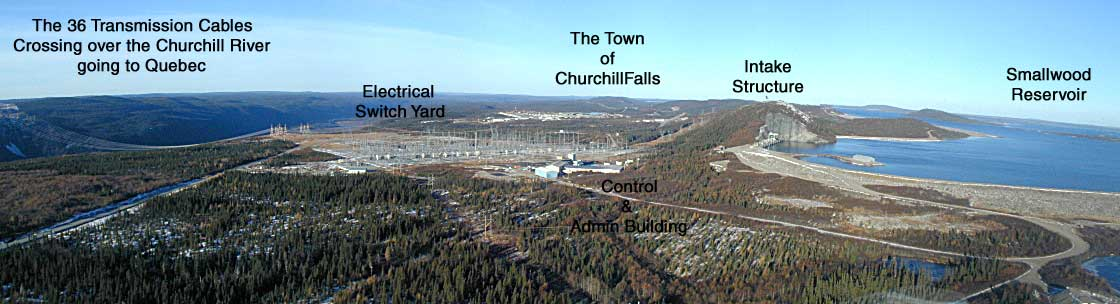
Churchill Falls with Lobstick Lake on the right
