= Mud Lake, Newfoundland and Labrador =

Coordinates: 53°18′20″N 60°10′01″W

Mud Lake is a small unincorporated community in central Labrador, Canada. It had a population of 54 as of 2021. The town is not accessible by road. It is usually reached by crossing the Churchill River by boat (during summer) or snowmobile (during winter).

== Notable people ==
Elizabeth Goudie, writer, was born there in 1902. Her son Joseph Goudie, a politician and former broadcaster, was born there in 1939.

== Flooding ==
In May 2017, the town was affected by severe flooding and its residents were evacuated to Happy Valley-Goose Bay. Many residents have planned a lawsuit against Nalcor Energy, the company behind the Lower Churchill Project upstream from the town which is alleged to have caused the flooding.

From June to December 2017, the residents resided at CFB Goose Bay.

An independent report on the flooding conducted in 2017 by KGS Group concluded that ice jammed up at the mouth of the Churchill River because of a combination of natural causes, forcing water over the riverbank, caused the flooding.

In 2019, a Newfoundland and Labrador Supreme Court justice ruled that a class-action lawsuit filed by Mud Lake residents against Nalcor Energy and the provincial government related to the flooding could proceed.

== See also ==
- Mud Lake — lakes in Newfoundland and Labrador
