= Mina Benson Hubbard =

Canadian explorer (1870–1956)

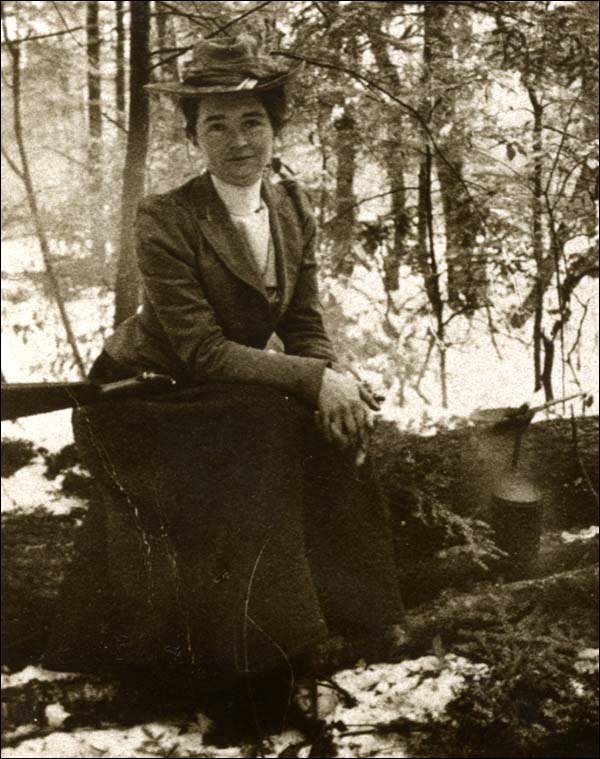
- Mina Benson Hubbard, A winter picnic ca. 1901 (courtesy of Betty Cawkill Ellis)
- Born: April 15, 1870; Bewdley, Ontario, Canada
- Died: May 4, 1956 (aged 86); Coulsdon, United Kingdom
- Occupation: explorer

Mina Benson Hubbard (April 15, 1870 - May 4, 1956) was a Canadian explorer and was the first white woman to travel and explore the back-country of Labrador. The Nascaupee and George River system were first accurately mapped by her in 1905. She was the wife of Leonidas Hubbard who was famous for his ill-fated expedition to Labrador in 1903.

== Early life ==
Mina Adelaine Benson was born on an apple farm near Bewdley, Ontario. Her father was James Benson, an Irish immigrant, and her mother was Jane Wood, from England. She was the seventh of eight children and received a primary education in the village school before teaching in Cobourg for two years.

After graduating as a nurse in 1899 from the Brooklyn Training School for Nurses, she went to work in a small hospital in Staten Island, New York, United States. In 1900, she nursed the journalist Leonidas Hubbard whilst he was hospitalized with typhus. They married on January 31, 1901.

== Expedition ==
Following her husband's ill-fated expedition to Labrador in 1903, Hubbard asked a surviving member of the party, Dillon Wallace, to record the experience as a memorial to her husband. His published book, Lure of the Labrador Wild was a commercial success in America, but Hubbard was not satisfied, coming to believe that Wallace was responsible for the death of her husband and that her husband's reputation had been blemished by Wallace's book.

In 1905, whilst Wallace was planning to mount a new expedition to complete the goal of 1903, Hubbard put together a team of her own to do the same thing in a bid to clear her husband's name. Consisting of the same George Elson who had been on the earlier expedition, along with two Cree men from the James Bay area and a local part-Inuit guide, Hubbard's team left Northwest River on June 27, the same day as the Wallace expedition. The press branded it a race and it received considerable attention in the news. The two parties never communicated before or during the expedition.

The 576-mile trip was an efficient, well organised trek through the Labrador wilderness, completed on schedule, despite weather delays at the beginning of August when they reached the watershed at Lake Michikamau. The expedition arrived at the George River post on Ungava Bay on 27 August, some seven weeks before Wallace.

In 43 days of travelling, the Hubbard expedition confirmed that the Nascaupee, Seal Lake, and Lake Michikamau were in the same drainage basin and that the Northwest River and the Nascaupee were, in fact, the same. In addition, Hubbard made extensive notes on the topography, geology, flora, and fauna of this unknown wilderness. She named the source of the George River, Lake Hubbard after her husband.

Her book, A Woman's Way Through Unknown Labrador, and her diaries provide descriptions of her encounters with the Naskapi and Montagnais Indians, and of the last great herds of Labrador's caribou.

== Later life ==
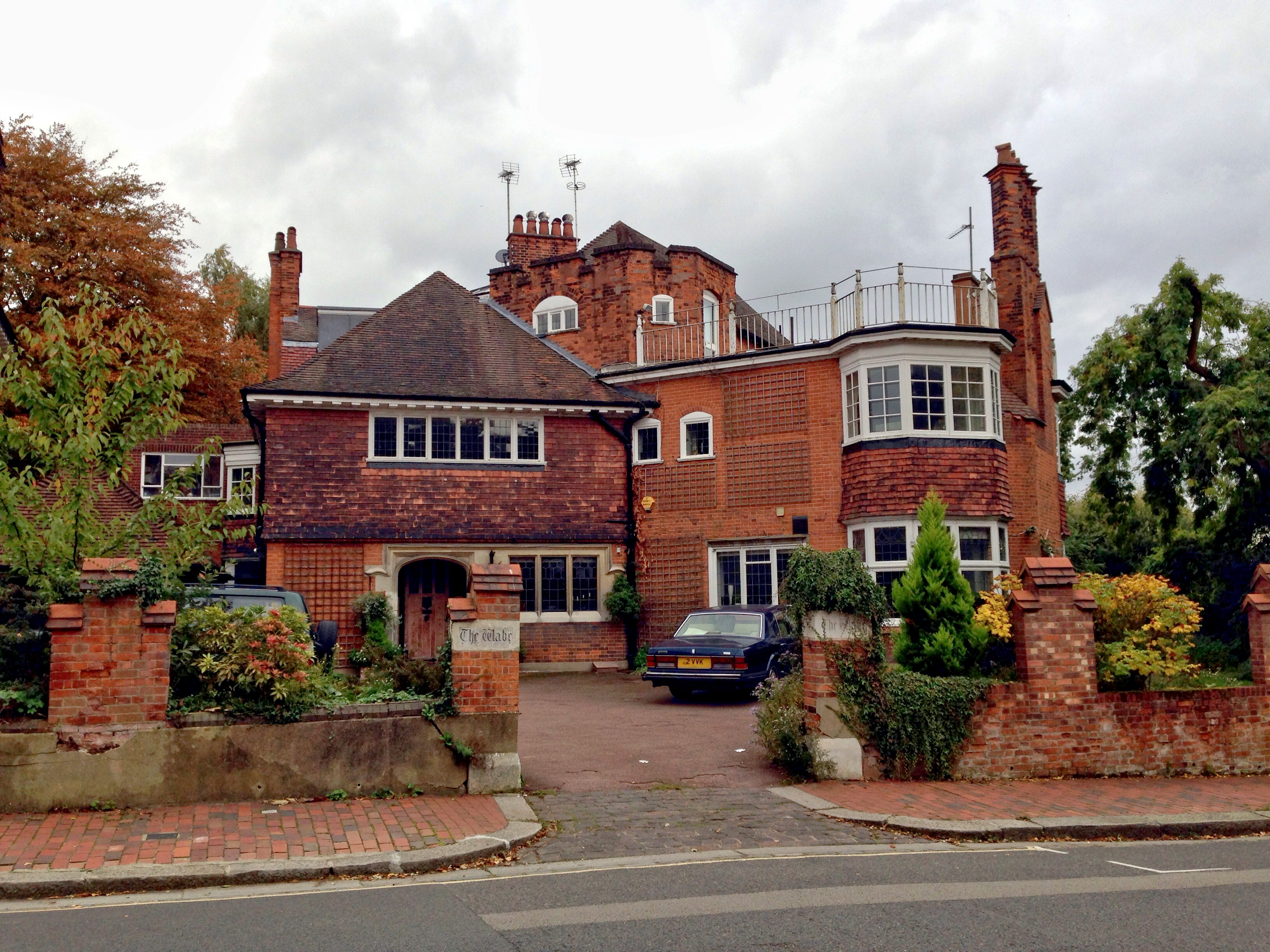
The Wabe, Redington Road, Hampstead, London NW3

After the trip, Hubbard carried out a lecture tour of England, where, in 1908, she met and married Harold Ellis, a businessman and the son of John Ellis, MP, and his wife Maria.

The couple lived at Wrea Head Hall at first, but in 1913, they purchased The Wabe, a large detached house in Hampstead, London, from its designer and original owner, the academic and mathematician William Garnett.

Together they had three children but divorced in 1926.

She returned to Canada in 1936 to accompany George Elson on a canoe trip down the Moose River in northern Ontario.

Hubbard died in Coulsdon, United Kingdom, in 1956 at the age of 86, when she was hit by a train while crossing railway tracks.

Mina Benson Hubbard Ellis was designated a National Historic Person in 2018.

== Bibliography ==
- Woman's Way Through Unknown Labrador available at Internet Archive

== See also ==
- Labrador
- History of Canada
