= Dillon Wallace =

American lawyer (1863–1939)

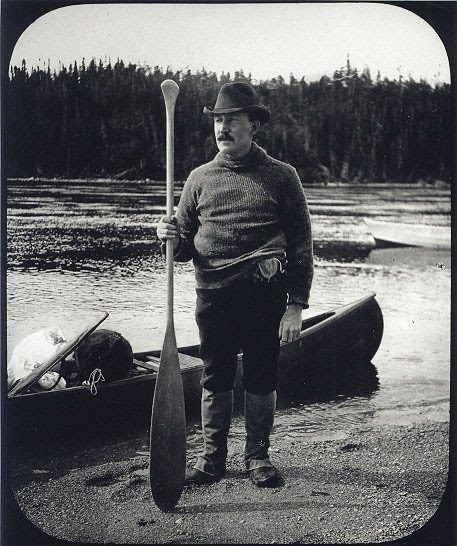
Dillon Wallace Labrador, 1903

Dillon Wallace (June 24, 1863 – September 28, 1939) was an American lawyer, outdoorsman, author of non-fiction, fiction and magazine articles. His first book, The Lure of the Labrador Wild (1905), was a best-seller, as were many of his later books.

== Biography ==
Dillon Wallace (junior) was born in Craigsville, New York, on June 24, 1863. He was the son of Dillon Wallace (senior) and Ruth Ann Ferguson. He grew up in Ridgebury, New York. After high school and a few years working in a variety of jobs, he enrolled at New York Law School in 1892, graduating in 1896. He went to the bar in 1897 and practiced law in New York for several years.

In 1900 Dillon Wallace met Leonidas Hubbard, an assistant editor with Outing magazine. Hubbard asked Wallace to join him on an exploratory trip through Labrador, the plan was to follow the Naskaupi River to Lake Michikamau, a region that had yet to be explored by Europeans. They departed in July 1903, but took the wrong river from the very start, following the much smaller and more difficult Susan River. Short on supplies, with winter coming on, Hubbard became ill and died of starvation. Wallace made it back alive.

Wallace wrote a book about the trip called The Lure of the Labrador Wild (1905), it was his first book and a best-seller. Hubbard's wife, Mina Hubbard, was upset with Wallace because she thought the book unfairly blamed her dead husband for the failed expedition, thus sullying her family name. After Wallace announced plans to make a second expedition to the same area, Mina announced her own plans to do the same, at the same time. "The great race of 1905" became a field day for the press. The two parties left just days apart, Mina following her husband's original route closely while Wallace took a more difficult overland route. Mina arrived first, with Wallace nearly 6 weeks behind. Mina wrote a book about the trip A Woman’s Way Through Unknown Labrador, Wallace also wrote a book, The Long Labrador Trail (1907). Neither Mina, in her book, nor Wallace his book, mentioned the other's 1905 expedition.

The Lure of the Labrador Wild was a best seller, and The Long Labrador Trail did well too, and so Wallace began a new career as a professional writer. He joined the staff of Outing magazine, which sent him on other expeditions around the world. Over the next 30 years he published 26 more books, fiction and non-fiction, and wrote many articles for Outing, National Sportsman, American Boy and other magazines. His books included biographies, references, boys fiction, novels and travel accounts.

In 1913, Wallace mounted a third Labrador expedition with the primary purpose of installing a memorial tablet at Leonidas Hubbard's place of death. The story of the journey through unknown country, drafted in book form by Wallace but never published, was serialized in condensed form as "Labrador Lures Me Back" in the February, March and April 1929 issues of National Sportsman magazine. The full story, edited by Rudy Mauro, was made available online in 2006 under its original title, Back to the Labrador Wilds.

Wallace married Leila Greenwood Hinman in 1917; his first wife, Jennie Currie, died in 1900 after three years of marriage. Dillon and Leila had two children, Leila Ann and Dillon III. Dillon Wallace died at Beacon, New York, on September 28, 1939.

== Works ==
- The Lure of the Labrador Wild (1905)
- The Long Labrador Trail (1907)
- Ungava Bob: A Winter's Tale (1907)
- Beyond the Mexican Sierras (1920)
- Hunting with the Eskimos (1910)
- Saddle and Camp in the Rockies (1911)
- Packaging and Portaging (1912)
- The Wilderness Castaways (1913)
- The Gaunt Gray Wolf: A Tale of Adventure with Ungava Bob (1914)
- The Fur Trail Adventurers (1915)
- Bobby of the Labrador (1916)
- The Arctic Stowaways (1917)
- Grit-A-Plenty: A Tale of the Labrador Wild (1918)
- John Adney, Ambulance Driver (1919)
- The Ragged Inlet Guards (1920)
- Troop One of the Labrador (1920)
- The Young Arctic Traders (1921)
- The Story of Grenfell of the Labrador:...Wilfred T Grenfell (1922)
- The Testing of Jim Maclean: A Tale of the Wilds of Labrador (1925)
- The Way to Burning Mountain (1926)
- Left on the Labrador: A Tale of Adventure Down North (1927)
- With Dog and Canoe (1928)
- Kidnapped by Air (1929)
- The Lost Mine (1930)
- The Fur Traders of Kettle Harbour (1931)
- The Crew of the Pioneer (1931)
- Buddies of the Sea (1932)
- The Camper's Handbook (1936)

== See also ==
- Third Man phenomenon
