= Leonidas Hubbard =

American journalist and adventurer (1872–1903)

Leonidas Hubbard Jr. (1872 – October 1903) was an American journalist and adventurer.

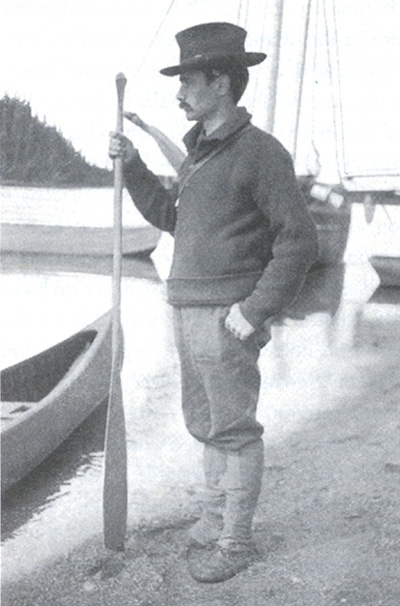
Leonidas Hubbard on the shore of Grand Lake at Northwest River, Labrador, July 1903, prior to embarking on his ill-fated expedition.

== Personal life ==
Hubbard was born in Michigan and studied at the University of Michigan (1893–97), choosing journalism as a career. In 1901 he married Mina Adelaine Benson, a woman two years his senior and at the time an assistant superintendent of a Staten Island hospital. They met at the hospital when Hubbard was ill with typhoid fever. He became an assistant editor of Outing magazine and in 1903 led an expedition to canoe the system Naskaupi River–Michikamau Lake in Labrador and George River in Quebec. His companions on this journey were his friend, New York lawyer Dillon Wallace, and a First Nations guide from Missanabie, George Elson.

== Ill-fated expedition ==
From the start (departing North West River on July 15), the expedition was beset with mistakes and problems. Instead of ascending the Naskaupi River, by mistake they followed the shallow Susan Brook.

After a hard, long portaging and almost reaching Michikamau Lake, with food supplies running out, on September 15 at Windbound Lake, they decided to turn back.

On October 18, Wallace and Elson went in a search of a cached store of flour, leaving Hubbard behind in a tent. Hubbard died of exhaustion and starvation on either the same or the next day.

Wallace got lost in the snowstorm, while Elson, after a week of bushwhacking, building a raft to cross swollen rivers (with no ax), reached the nearest occupied cabin. A search party found Wallace alive on October 30, 1903.

After Wallace was nursed back to health (he suffered gangrene in his foot), the two men accompanied Hubbard's body back to New York for burial in May 1904.

In 1905, Mina Hubbard (accompanied by George Elson) and Dillon Wallace led two competing expeditions from North West River to the Hudson's Bay Company post at the mouth of George River. Both were successful, with Mina Hubbard beating Dillon Wallace by over seven weeks.

In 1913, Wallace returned with Judge William Malone and Gilbert Blake to place a memorial plaque where his friend perished (53°45′58.96″N 61°28′21.98″W).

Their canoe overturned on Beaver River and the plaque was lost. Wallace then created a memorial using white paint and a brush made from Gilbert's hair.

In July 1977, with the assistance of the Government of Newfoundland and Labrador, Dillon Wallace III, the son of Hubbard's companion, and Rudy Mauro placed a replica of the lost plaque on the inscribed stone at Hubbard's last camp.

The inscription reads:

THIS TABLET
MARKS THE SCENE
OF THE TRAGIC DEATH
FROM EXHAUSTION ON
OCTOBER 18, 1903
OF
LEONIDAS HUBBARD JR.
INTREPID EXPLORER
AND
PRACTICAL CHRISTIAN
ERECTED BY LOVING FRIENDS
JUNE 1913
JOHN XIV IV: AND WHITHER I GO
YE KNOW, AND THE WAY YE KNOW

AN EXACT REPLICA OF A TABLET LOST IN THE BEAVER
RIVER, THIS MARKER REPLACES AN INSCRIPTION
CARVED HERE IN 1913 BY DILLON WALLACE, JUDGE
WILLIAM J. MALONE AND GILBERT BLAKE
DEDICATED IN 1976 BY DILLON WALLACE III. ASSISTED
BY THE GOVERNMENT OF NEWFOUNDLAND, IN COMM-
EMORATION OF THE EXPLORATORY JOURNEY OF LEONIDAS
HUBBARD, DILLON WALLACE AND GEORGE ELSON,
FROM NORTH WEST RIVER TO WINDBOUND LAKE

The 1903 and 1905 expeditions were the subject of a 2008 Canadian docudrama The Last Explorer, directed by Elson's great-nephew, Cree filmmaker Neil Diamond.

Three plaques at Mount Repose Cemetery in Haverstraw, NY celebrate his achievements. One of them reads:

1872 - 1903
TO THE MEMORY OF LEONIDAS HUBBARD, JR.
SPORTSMAN - WRITER - EXPLORER - CHRISTIAN
WHO DIED IN HIS TENT IN LABRADOR

ALONE - BUT IN SPIRIT TRIUMPHANT AND FREE
