= Lake Melville =

Saltwater tidal basin in Newfoundland and Labrador, Canada

- Tessiartosoak (Inuktitut); Atatshi-unipek (Innu)
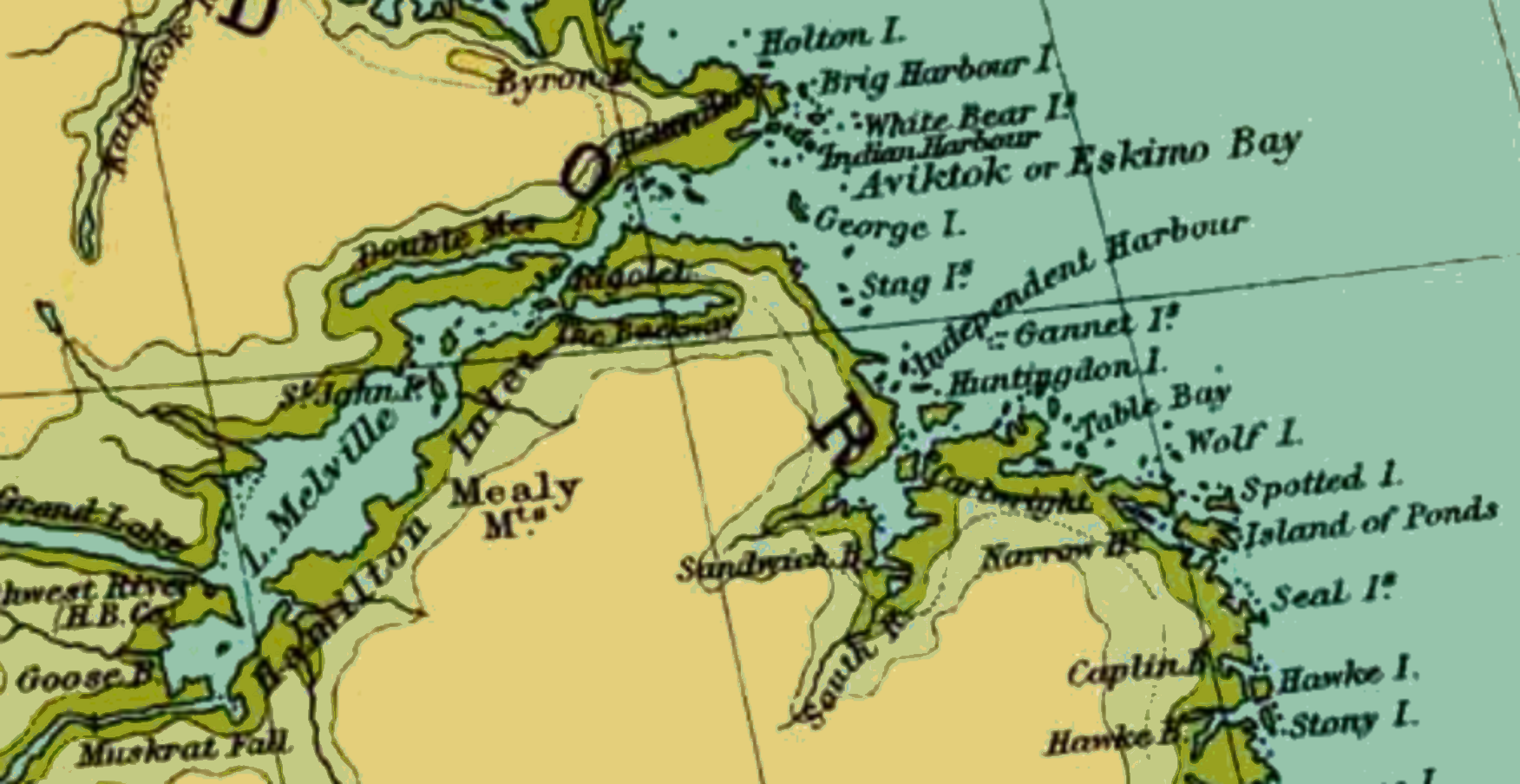
- A map of the Lake Melville/Hamilton Inlet/Groswater Bay system, showing Hamilton Inlet as inclusive of L. Melville

- Location in Labrador
- Location: Labrador, Newfoundland and Labrador, Canada
- Coordinates: 53°41′N 59°43′W
- Type: Tidal Extension
- Basin countries: Canada
- Surface area: 3,069 km^{2} (1,185 mi^{2})
- Settlements: Happy Valley-Goose Bay, Mud Lake, North West River, Rigolet, Sheshatshiu

Lake Melville is an estuary of Hamilton Inlet (itself an extension of Groswater Bay) on the Labrador coast of the Canadian province of Newfoundland and Labrador. Comprising 3,069 km^{2} (1,185 mi^{2}) and stretching 140 km (87 mi) inland to Happy Valley-Goose Bay, it forms part of the largest estuary in the province, primarily draining the Churchill River and Naskaupi River watersheds. Both Lake Melville and Hamilton Inlet are encircled by mountains, with primary settlements at Happy Valley-Goose Bay, North West River, and Sheshatshiu. It is the 46th largest lake globally.

== Name ==
Lake Melville was named for Henry Dundas, first Viscount Melville, who served as Britain's lord of the Admiralty in 1804 and 1805.

== Geography ==
Lake Melville is situated in central Labrador. To the south are the Mealy Mountains while another inlet (Double Mer) is located to the north. The Churchill River flows into the southwest point of Lake Melville. Lake Melville extends further inland between the communities of North West River and Sheshatshiu and these extensions are known as "Little Lake" and "Grand Lake". The Naskaupi River flows into Grand Lake.

Lake Melville is served by the Trans-Labrador Highway network. Route 500 spans from the mouth of the Churchill River at Happy Valley-Goose Bay to Labrador West while Route 510 goes from Happy Valley-Goose Bay to Blanc-Sablon where a ferry can be taken to Newfoundland. Route 520 is a paved highway on the west coast of Lake Melville connecting Happy Valley-Goose Bay, Sheshatshiu and North West River. Rigolet and Mud Lake are the only two communities in the region that cannot be reached by road.

== History ==
The area around Lake Melville was historically inhabited by the Inuit and the Innu. It is believed that Labrador's Inuit migrated to Labrador from Baffin Island in search of Europeans (the Norse are thought to have landed at Baffin Island around 1000 AD). At the end of the Seven Years' War, New France (including Labrador) was ceded to Great Britain. The British decided to develop a cod fishery in Labrador. The fishermen (who mostly came from Newfoundland), often married Inuit women and thus created the "Inuit-Metis". In 1824, the population around Lake Melville was 326 which consisted of 160 Inuit, 60 "half-Inuit", 90 European settlers, and 16 Canadian settlers.

The economy around Lake Melville was historically based around the fishery and fur. Fort Smith (present-day North West River) was the seat of the Hudson's Bay Company factor for the surrounding territory. After John McLean discovered convenient riverine routes into the interior, it also was the supply centre for Fort Naskaupi. Fish and fur prices plummeted with the stock market crash beginning in 1929, weakening the meager though meaningful subsistence-based economy. Construction of an air base at Goose Bay in 1941 and radar installations along the coast offered Southern Inuit their first wage employment. Today, the town of Happy Valley-Goose Bay is one of the largest communities in Labrador and the tenth-largest community in the province of Newfoundland and Labrador.

The Lower Churchill Project is a planned hydroelectric project on the lower Churchill River.

== Transportation ==
A ferry service runs on Lake Melville and Hamilton Inlet, connecting a number communities including Happy Valley-Goose Bay, Rigolet and Cartwright.
