= Smallwood Reservoir =

- Location in Labrador
- Location: Labrador, Newfoundland and Labrador, Canada
- Coordinates: 54°6′N 64°25′W
- Type: Reservoir
- Primary outflows: Churchill River
- Basin countries: Canada
- Surface area: 6,527 km^{2} (2,520 sq mi)
- Water volume: 32.64 km^{3} (26,460,000 acre⋅ft)
- Surface elevation: 471 m (1,545 ft)

The Smallwood Reservoir is the reservoir created for the Churchill Falls Generating Station in the western part of Labrador, Canada. Unlike other reservoirs, water is contained not by a single large dam, but by a series of 88 dikes that total 64 km (40 mi) in length in the drainage area of the Churchill River. It is named in honour of Joey Smallwood, the first premier of Newfoundland.

With an area of 6,527 km^{2} (2,520 sq mi), is the largest body of freshwater in the province and the fifth-largest reservoir in the world in terms of surface area.

== History ==
The earliest evaluation of hydro potential of this vast reservoir was in 1942 when H.G. Acres Company carried out a study for the Aluminum Company of Canada (Alcan). Due to the remoteness of the site then, it was considered too expensive to build and deemed not viable.

With the development of technologies for transmission of electricity over long distances the project design to build the power development including the main dam and control structure and the many dykes began in July 1967 by Acres Canadian Bechtel of Churchill Falls, a joint venture formed by Canadian Bechtel and Acres Engineering, as part of the construction of the Churchill Falls Generating Station.

== Geography ==
The reservoir is located on the Labrador Plateau, a saucer shaped plateau that ranged from 457 to 579 m (1,499 to 1,900 ft) above sea level. Before construction, it was inundated with many bogs and small interconnected lakes. The three largest of these lakes were Ossokmanuan, Lobstick and Michikamau. Ossokmanuan became a reservoir for the Twin Falls power station.

The area was mostly drained by the Churchill River. At the edge of the plateau it dropped 66 m (217 ft) before the falls, a further 75 m (246 ft) at the falls and a further 158 m (518 ft) through the Bowdoin Canyon. It was named after Bowdoin College in Maine which sponsored an expedition in 1891 to visit the falls.

== Construction ==
The reservoir requires 88 dykes to prevent overflow outside of the reservoir. The highest of these dykes is 36 m (118 ft) and the longest is 6 km (3.7 mi). The two reservoirs require three control structures to regulate flow. The Gabbro Control Structure which regulated the Ossokmanuan reservoir, the Lobstick Control Structure that regulates the Smallwood reservoir and the Whitefish Control Structure for the forebay reservoirs. Both forebays are further regulated by spillways to prevent flooding.

The project took 9 years to complete from 1966 to 1974, with peak construction in 1970 when a total of 6,245 workers were stationed at the main camp and eleven satellite camps. The project was completed five months ahead of schedule.

== See also ==
- Churchill Falls
