= Naskaupi River =

River in Canada

Coordinates: 53°46′41″N 60°50′39″W

Mouth of the Naskaupi River

The Naskaupi River is the second largest river in Labrador, Canada. Its drainage basin lies north of that of Labrador's longest river, the Churchill River. Like the Churchill River, it drains into the western end of the estuary known as Lake Melville.

"Nascaupee" First Nation by Frank Weston Benson (1921)

The Naskapi First Nation peoples used the river to travel to Labrador. Several expeditions explored the river around the turn of the 19/20th century. Mina Benson, the widow of Leonidas Hubbard, who died on a failed 1903 expedition is noted as having made admirable observations during a successful 1905 expedition. Frank Weston Benson, an American artist with not apparent relationship to Mina Benson, sketched the Naskapi.

The river's drainage basin is 4,714 square kilometres (1,820 sq mi). The basin has no permanent inhabitants, and no roads. Just under half the area is covered by forest. Slightly more than one quarter of the area is covered by other vegetation. Approximately 17 percent is covered by lakes, rivers, or wetlands. The government of Newfoundland and Labrador classes the rest as "barren" or "unclassified".

When a series of 88 dikes were built, to establish the Smallwood reservoir, for the Churchill Falls Hydroelectric Project, water was diverted from the Naskaupi River to the Churchill River drainage basin.
