= Mud Lake (Newfoundland and Labrador) =

There are several lakes named Mud Lake within the Canadian province of Newfoundland and Labrador.

- Mud Lake, located east of Happy Valley-Goose Bay, Newfoundland and Labrador, near the mouth of the Churchill River. 53°17′29″N 60°07′39″W
- Mud Lake, located north of Botwood, Newfoundland and Labrador. 49°15′55″N 55°25′50″W
