= Churchill Falls =

Waterfall in Newfoundland and Labrador, Canada

- Grand Falls, Patshishetshuanau
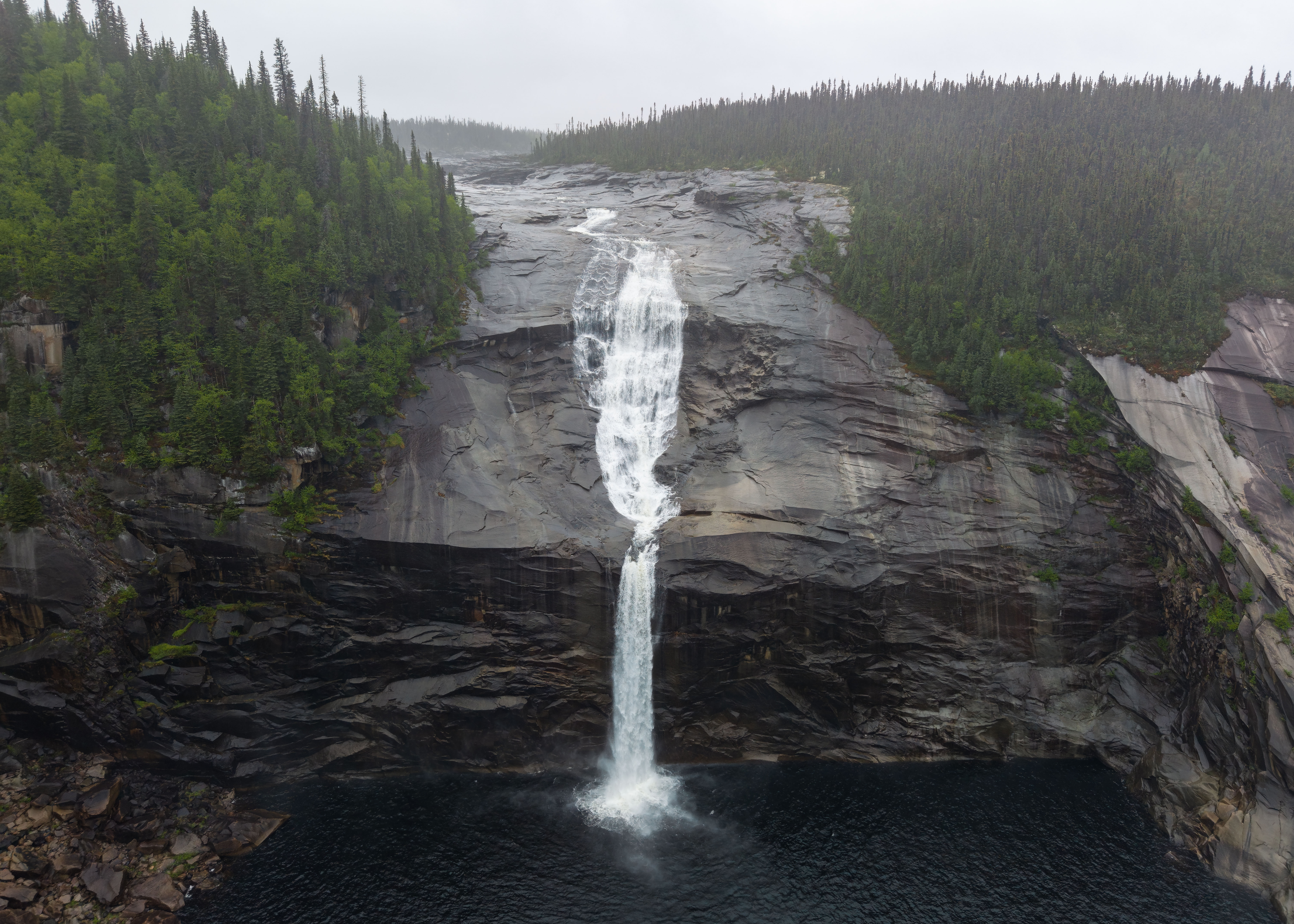
- Churchill Falls in 2026, with most of its water diverted

- Location within Newfoundland and Labrador
- Location: Labrador
- Coordinates: 53°35′41″N 64°18′30″W
- Type: Segmented Block
- Total height: 74.7 m (245 ft)
- Watercourse: Churchill River
- Average flow rate: 6 m^{3}/s (210 cu ft/s)

Churchill Falls (formerly called Grand Falls and known as Patshishetshuanau in Innu) is a 245 ft (74.7 m) high waterfall on the Churchill River in Labrador, Canada. Formerly counted among the most impressive natural features of Canada, the diversion of the river for the Churchill Falls Generating Station has cut off almost all of the falls' former flow, leaving a small stream winding through its old bed and trickling down the rocks.

== Names ==
John McLean called the cascades the Grand Falls, as the Churchill River at that time was usually still known as the Grand River as a calque of its Indigenous name. The Innu had a separate name for the falls, Patshishetshuanau ('place where the current makes clouds'). Captain William Martin's 1821 renaming of the river after Labrador's colonial governor Charles Hamilton gradually became more common but the falls continued to be known as the "Grand Falls" or less often as the McLean Falls. On 1 February 1965, the provincial premier Joey Smallwood renamed the river and the falls after the former British prime minister Winston Churchill ahead of approving its large hydroelectric project.

== History ==
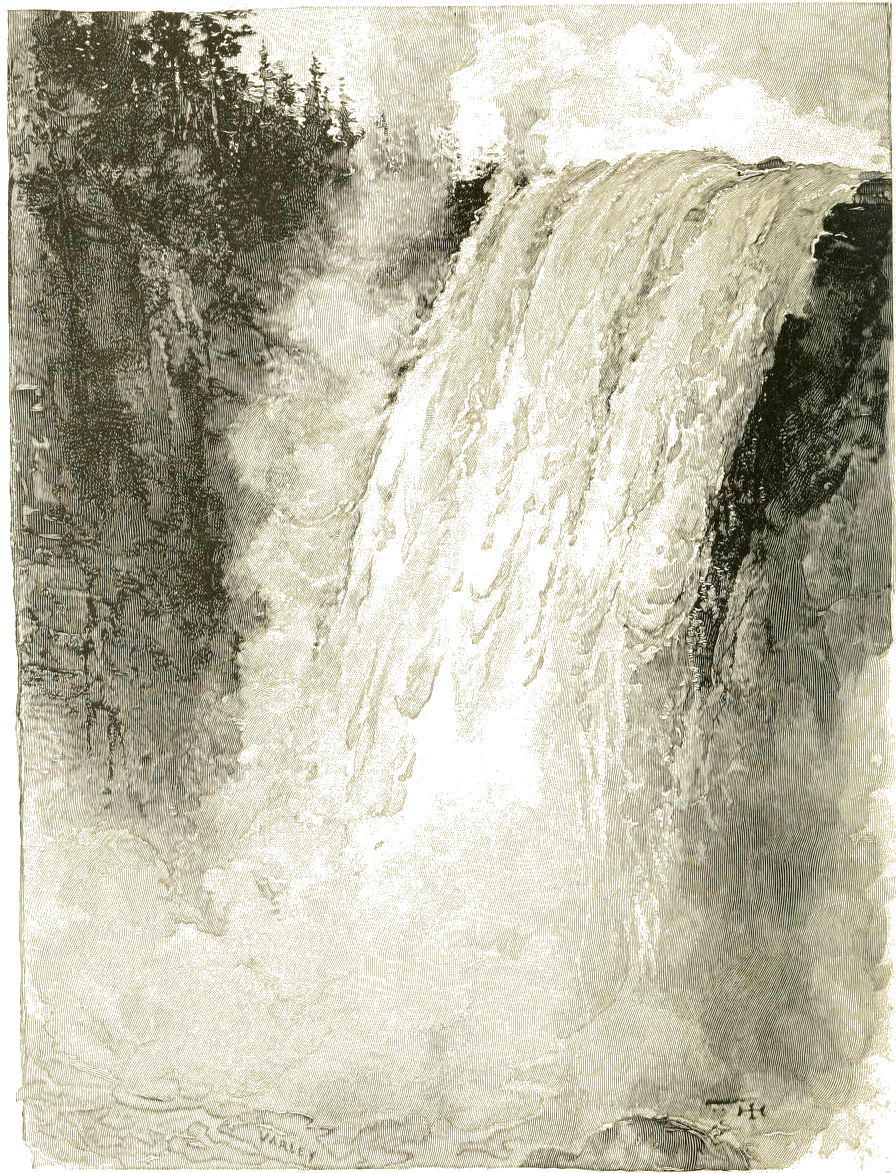
An engraving of a photograph of the Grand Falls c. 1890

The falls were a significant landmark for local Indigenous peoples. The Innu believed that to look on these awe-inspiring falls meant death and maintained a strong taboo against visiting into the early 20th century.

In 1839, a team led by the explorer and trader John McLean—seeking a navigable route between Fort Chimo in northwest Labrador and Fort Smith on Lake Melville in southeast Labrador for the Hudson's Bay Company—were the first Europeans to discover the area. McLean was mostly annoyed that the falls presented an obstacle to a direct river route and meant retracing his path back north, but he was still overwhelmed by the falls' majesty.

Fifty years later, the unmapped falls were sought as part of an 1891 scientific expedition to Labrador consisting of alumni and faculty from Bowdoin College in Maine. On July 26 a four-man party embarked in canoes heading westwards from the expedition's schooner Julia Decker, but injury forced two of them to turn back. Austin Cary and Dennis Cole continued onwards; after a 300-mile (480 km) trek they reached the falls by foot on August 13. They named the canyon at the foot of the falls "Bowdoin Canyon", after their alma mater. They also named a nearby peak Mount Hyde, after Bowdoin president William De Witt Hyde. In 1894, Albert Peter Low of Canada's Geological Survey reached the falls.

Plans were made as early as 1915 to divert the river above the falls for power generation, but they were abandoned as infeasible at the time. Following the development of the iron ore mines in western Labrador and the construction of the Quebec North Shore and Labrador Railway in 1954, the project became workable and surveys and planning began. Construction on the Churchill Falls Generating Station started in 1967 and, in 1970, almost all of the Churchill's water was diverted into a reservoir upstream of the falls. Only a small stream remains; even when the reservoir hits its maximum water levels, usually a once-a-decade event, the controlled release over the falls amounts to only about 10% of the falls' former flow.

== Legacy ==
The nearby company town of Churchill Falls is named for the falls.

== See also ==
- List of waterfalls
- List of waterfalls of Canada
- Lists of waterfalls by type, height, and flow rate
- Muskrat Falls Generating Station
