= Michikamau Lake =

Former lake in Labrador, Canada

- Location within Newfoundland and Labrador
- Location: Labrador, Canada
- Coordinates: 54°11′00″N 63°59′57″W

Michikamau Lake, in Labrador, Canada, was absorbed into Smallwood Reservoir upon the completion of the Churchill Falls Generating Station in 1974. The lake makes up the largest part of the eastern section of the reservoir, while Lobstick Lake, also absorbed in Smallwood's creation, makes up the largest part of the western section. The lake is up to 84 meters deep. Reaching the lake was the goal of an expedition by Leonidas Hubbard, Dillon Wallace, and George Elson as described in Wallace's memoir, The Lure Of The Labrador Wild.
