= List of generating stations in Newfoundland and Labrador =

This is a list of electrical generating stations in Newfoundland and Labrador, Canada.

Newfoundland and Labrador has 74 power stations, with a generating capacity of 8,652 MW; the province mainly relies on hydropower for its generation needs. The province's largest power station, the 5,428-megawatt Churchill Falls Generating Station, annually generates over 35 TWh of electricity; approximately 90 per cent of this energy flows to Quebec and neighboring markets in Canada, and the USA.

Newfoundland Power, a subsidiary of St. John's-based Fortis Inc., is the retailer of electricity for most customers in the province. Newfoundland and Labrador Hydro, a Crown corporation, owns and operates most generation, the transmission grid and sells directly to large industrial customers. The company also serves remote communities not connected to the main power grids, on Newfoundland and in Labrador.

Generating stations in Newfoundland and Labrador serving loads not connected to the main power grid are listed in italics.

== Hydroelectric ==
List of hydroelectric power stations in Newfoundland and Labrador.

Name	Location	Capacity (MW)	Commission date	Owner	Ref
Bay d'Espoir	47°59′25″N 55°47′59″W	613.4	1967	Newfoundland and Labrador Hydro	
Bishop's Falls	49°00′55.3″N 55°28′19.8″W	22	1916	Newfoundland and Labrador Hydro	
Buchans Dam	48°49′19.4″N 56°49′52.9″W	1.85	1988	Newfoundland and Labrador Hydro	
Cape Broyle	47°05′45.3″N 52°56′13.9″W	6.28	1952	Newfoundland Power	
Cat Arm	50°01′39″N 56°45′55″W	134	1985	Newfoundland and Labrador Hydro	
Churchill Falls (Note: To be upgraded to 7,078 MW by 2035.)	53°31′32″N 63°57′25″W	5,428	1974	Churchill Falls (Labrador) Corporation	
Deer Lake	49°10′11.7″N 57°26′10.5″W	129.6	1925	Kruger Energy	
Fall Pond (Little St. Lawrence)	46°55′42.6″N 55°21′26.2″W	0.35	1942	Newfoundland Power	
Grand Falls	48°55′31.5″N 55°40′04.2″W	75	1937	Newfoundland Power, NL Hydro	
Granite Canal	48°11′47.6″N 56°48′54.9″W	41	2003	Newfoundland and Labrador Hydro	
Heart's Content	47°51′46.1″N 53°22′32.6″W	2.7	1918	Newfoundland Power	
Hinds Lake	49°04′56.9″N 57°12′04.9″W	75	1980	Newfoundland and Labrador Hydro	
Horsechops	47°07′55.2″N 52°58′53.7″W	8.13	1953	Newfoundland Power	
Lawn	46°56′52.6″N 55°32′10.3″W	0.6	1983	Newfoundland Power	
Lockston	48°24′03.4″N 53°22′43.3″W	3	1955	Newfoundland Power	
Lookout Brook	48°21′58.5″N 58°17′39.3″W	5.8	1958	Newfoundland Power	
Mary's Harbour	52°18′06.7″N 55°51′27.4″W	0.24	1987	St. Mary's River Energy LP	
Menihek (Note: This generating station is under contract by Hydro-Québec to serve off-grid loads in the Schefferville, Quebec area.)	54°28′16″N 66°36′45″W	17.2	1954	Newfoundland and Labrador Hydro	
Mobile	47°14′52.3″N 52°50′30.5″W	10.5	1951	Newfoundland Power	
Muskrat Falls	53°14′44.0″N 60°46′22.0″W	824	2021	Newfoundland and Labrador Hydro	
New Chelsea	48°01′44.9″N 53°12′36.9″W	3.7	1957	Newfoundland Power	
Paradise River	47°37′05.2″N 54°25′53.7″W	8	1989	Newfoundland and Labrador Hydro	
Petty Harbour	47°27′55.2″N 52°42′44.6″W	5.25	1900	Newfoundland Power	
Pierre's Brook	47°17′18.0″N 52°49′15.6″W	4.3	1931	Newfoundland Power	
Pitman's Pond	48°00′23.3″N 53°11′39.0″W	0.625	1959	Newfoundland Power	
Port Union	48°29′53.2″N 53°05′24.0″W	0.511	1918	Newfoundland Power	
Rattle Brook	49°53′15.6″N 56°50′09.1″W	4	1998	Algonquin Power	
Rattling Brook	49°04′03.1″N 55°17′53.6″W	14.8	1959	Newfoundland Power	
Rocky Pond	47°15′13.2″N 52°56′09.2″W	3.25	1943	Newfoundland Power	
Roddickton	50°53′29.1″N 56°03′15.8″W	0.4	1980	Newfoundland and Labrador Hydro	
Rose Blanche Brook	47°39′06.6″N 58°42′46.8″W	6	1998	Newfoundland Power	
Sandy Brook	48°53′27.3″N 55°49′22.1″W	6.31	1963	Newfoundland Power	
Seal Cove	47°27′26.6″N 53°04′03.9″W	3.58	1923	Newfoundland Power	
Snooks Arm	49°51′14.8″N 55°42′43.0″W	0.56	1956	Newfoundland and Labrador Hydro	
Star Lake	48°33′08.1″N 57°12′20.4″W	18.4	1998	Enel Green Power, NL Hydro	
Topsail	47°32′22.2″N 52°55′08.6″W	2.6	1983	Newfoundland Power	
Tors Cove	47°12′38.1″N 52°50′54.3″W	6.5	1942	Newfoundland Power	
Twin Falls (Note: This generating station was put into extended shutdown in 1974, and the water diverted to Churchill Falls.)	53.496478°N 64.5201199°W	225	1963	Twin Falls Power Corporation Ltd.	
Upper Salmon	48°11′00.9″N 56°10′22.9″W	84	1983	Newfoundland and Labrador Hydro	
Venams Bight	49°52′06.3″N 55°39′26.8″W	0.34	1956	Newfoundland and Labrador Hydro	
Victoria	47°46′30.4″N 53°12′55.7″W	0.55	1904	Newfoundland Power	
Watson's Brook	48°56′29.2″N 57°55′41.4″W	9.3	1958	Kruger Energy	
West Brook	46°56′33.2″N 55°23′03.9″W	0.68	1942	Newfoundland Power	

== Petroleum ==
List of Fossil fuel power stations in Labrador and Newfoundland.

Name	Location	Capacity (MW)	Date	Owner	Type	Ref
Big Bay	55°44′19.6″N 60°25′47.9″W		1992	Royal Canadian Air Force	Diesel genset	
Black Tickle	53°27′23.5″N 55°45′57.4″W	1.0		Newfoundland and Labrador Hydro	Diesel genset	
Cartwright	53°42′31.1″N 57°00′48.5″W	2.22		Newfoundland and Labrador Hydro	Diesel genset	
Cape Kakiviak	59°59′15″N 64°09′55″W		1992	Royal Canadian Air Force	Diesel genset	
Cape Kiglapait	57°08′07″N 61°28′32″W		1992	Royal Canadian Air Force	Diesel genset	
Charlottetown	52°46′21.4″N 56°06′43.8″W	2.54		Newfoundland and Labrador Hydro	Diesel genset	
Cartwright	53°33′04″N 56°49′48″W		1992	Royal Canadian Air Force	Diesel genset	
Francois	47°34′39.6″N 56°44′40.0″W	0.635	2002	Newfoundland and Labrador Hydro	Diesel genset	
Grey River	47°35′21.3″N 57°06′07.6″W	0.522		Newfoundland and Labrador Hydro	Diesel genset	
Happy Valley	53°17′25.3″N 60°21′31.7″W	25	1992	Newfoundland and Labrador Hydro	Combustion turbine (diesel)	
Hardwoods	47°31′27.4″N 52°50′49.0″W	50	1976	Newfoundland and Labrador Hydro	Combustion turbine (diesel)	
Hawke's Bay	50°36′50.4″N 57°09′46.9″W	5		Newfoundland and Labrador Hydro	Diesel genset	
Holyrood Thermal Generating Station	47°27′10″N 53°05′43″W	490	1971	Newfoundland and Labrador Hydro	Thermal (fuel oil)	
Holyrood Turbine Station	47°27′04.8″N 53°05′47.4″W	123.5	2015	Newfoundland and Labrador Hydro	Combustion turbine (diesel)	
Holyrood Diesel	47°27′06.2″N 53°05′49.6″W	11	2014	Newfoundland and Labrador Hydro	Diesel genset	
Hopedale	55°27′14.9″N 60°13′27.0″W	2.62		Newfoundland and Labrador Hydro	Diesel genset	
L'Anse au Loop	51°31′07.8″N 56°50′22.7″W	8.05		Newfoundland and Labrador Hydro	Diesel genset	
Makkovik	55°04′59.0″N 59°10′27.2″W	1.76		Newfoundland and Labrador Hydro	Diesel genset	
Mary's Harbour	52°18′42.3″N 55°50′26.3″W	2.6		Newfoundland and Labrador Hydro	Diesel genset	
McCallum	47°37′49.9″N 56°13′45.7″W	0.446		Newfoundland and Labrador Hydro	Diesel genset	
Nain	56°32′13.4″N 61°41′24.7″W	3.86	1974	Newfoundland and Labrador Hydro	Diesel genset	
Natuashish	55°55′12.2″N 61°07′32.3″W	3.33	2002	Mushuau Innu First Nation	Diesel genset	
Norman's Bay	52°56′11.5″N 55°54′10.1″W	0.16		Newfoundland and Labrador Hydro	Diesel genset	
Paradise River	53°26′20.4″N 57°16′38.9″W	0.148		Newfoundland and Labrador Hydro	Diesel genset	
Port Hope Simpson	52°33′10.4″N 56°18′12.5″W	2.32		Newfoundland and Labrador Hydro	Diesel genset	
Postville	54°54′20.3″N 59°46′31.9″W	1.06		Newfoundland and Labrador Hydro	Diesel genset	
Ramea	47°31′34.1″N 57°23′13.2″W	2.77		Newfoundland and Labrador Hydro	Diesel genset	
Rigolet	54°10′42.9″N 58°25′35.7″W	1.32		Newfoundland and Labrador Hydro	Diesel genset	
Saglek	58°29′18″N 62°35′08″W		1992	Royal Canadian Air Force	Diesel genset	
St. Anthony	51°23′02.6″N 55°35′29.8″W	9.7		Newfoundland and Labrador Hydro	Diesel genset	
St. Brendan's	48°52′23.1″N 53°40′13.5″W	0.712		Newfoundland and Labrador Hydro	Diesel genset	
St. Lewis	52°21′55.0″N 55°41′21.7″W	1.02		Newfoundland and Labrador Hydro	Diesel genset	
Stephenville	48°32′08.3″N 58°31′04.9″W	50	1975	Newfoundland and Labrador Hydro	Combustion turbine (diesel)	
Tukialik	54°42′53″N 58°21′30″W		1992	Royal Canadian Air Force	Diesel genset	

== Renewable ==
Name	Location	Capacity (MW)	Date	Owner	Type	Ref
Corner Brook Cogeneration	48°57′20.7″N 57°56′59.5″W	17.6	2003	Kruger Energy	Cogeneration (biomass)	
Fermeuse	46°59′04.4″N 52°55′08.6″W	27	2007	Fermeuse Wind Power Corp	Wind	
Mary's Harbour	52°18′46.0″N 55°50′38.2″W	0.25	2018	St. Mary's River Energy LP	Photovoltaic	
New World Dairy	48.197704°N 58.879587°W	0.4	2017	New World Dairy	Biogas	
Ramea Hybrid power	47°31′35.0″N 57°23′14.5″W	0.3	2009	Newfoundland and Labrador Hydro	Wind, diesel, hydrogen	
St. Lawrence	46°57′57.2″N 55°25′36.3″W	27	2007	Elemental Energy	Wind	

== Decommissioned stations ==
Name	Location	Capacity (MW)	Date	Owner	Type	Ref
Aguathuna	48°33′43″N 58°46′09″W	1.2	1962–1998	Newfoundland Light & Power	Diesel genset	
Bay Bulls	47°19′28″N 52°49′08″W		1942–1946	Royal Canadian Navy	Hydroelectric	
Black River	47°52′49″N 54°10′07″W	8.8	1897–1903	Harvey and Company	Hydroelectric	
Campbellton	49°16′45″N 54°55′21″W		1914–1916	Horwood Lumber Company	Hydroelectric	
Cape Makkovik	55.225°N 59.145833°W	0.95	1957–1961	United States Air Force	Diesel genset	
Cartwright	53.724444°N 56.964167°W	0.95	1953–1968	United States Air Force	Diesel genset	
Cut Throat Island	53.724444°N 56.964167°W	0.95	1953–1968	United States Air Force	Diesel genset	
Davis Inlet	55.894855°N 60.902273°W		1969–2006	Newfoundland and Labrador Hydro	Diesel genset	
Elliston Ridge	48.625833°N 53.058611°W	0.95	1957–1961	United States Air Force	Diesel genset	
Flavin's Lane	47.568633°N 52.708150°W	0.186	1885–1892	St. John's Electric Light Co.	Thermal (coal)	
Fox Harbour	52.37°N 55.664444°W	0.95	1957–1961	United States Air Force	Diesel genset	
Gander	48°56′56″N 54°35′08″W	2.65	1949–1998	Newfoundland Power	Diesel genset	
Glovertown	48°39′58″N 54°00′32″W		1921–1923	Terra Nova Sulphite Co.	Hydroelectric	
Hopedale	55.466389°N 60.229722°W	0.95	1953–1968	United States Air Force	Diesel genset	
La Scie	49.980556°N 55.53°W	0.95	1957–1961	United States Air Force	Diesel genset	
Port aux Basques	47°36′34″N 59°10′58″W	3.07	1973–2000	Newfoundland Light & Power	Diesel genset	
Port Union	48°29′53″N 53°05′25″W	0.5	1949–1998	Newfoundland Light & Power	Diesel genset	
Red Cliff	47.638889°N 52.667222°W	0.95	1953–1961	United States Air Force	Diesel genset	
Roddickton (Diesel)	50°53′25″N 56°07′23″W	1.7	1989–2000	Newfoundland and Labrador Hydro	Diesel genset	
Roddickton (Thermal)	50°53′25″N 56°07′23″W	5	1989–2000	Newfoundland and Labrador Hydro	Thermal (biomass)	
Saint Anthony	51.349167°N 55.610833°W	0.95	1953–1968	United States Air Force	Diesel genset	
Salt Pond	47°05′37″N 55°12′10″W	1.5	1963–1998	Newfoundland Light & Power	Diesel genset	
Spotted Island	53.518056°N 55.748889°W	0.95	1957–1961	United States Air Force	Diesel genset	
St. John's (Diesel)	47.563886°N 52.690469°W	2.5	1953–2005	Newfoundland Light & Power	Diesel genset	
St. John's (Steam)	47.563909°N 52.690110°W	9.8	1956–2000	Newfoundland Power	Thermal (fuel oil)	
Stephenville	48.589167°N 58.666111°W	0.95	1951–1971	United States Air Force	Diesel genset	

== Undeveloped stations ==
Name	Location	Capacity (MW)	Annual energy (GWh)	Type	Ref
Adies Pond (Upper Humber)	49°25′39″N 57°14′30″W	10.2	50.2	Hydroelectric	
Bay d'Espoir (Unit 8 expansion)	47°59′25″N 55°47′59″W	154	665	Hydroelectric	
Bay du Nord	47°47′59″N 55°26′14″W	63	367	Hydroelectric	
Bottom Brook	47°47′49″N 56°20′05″W	8.7	39.6	Hydroelectric	
Cascade River	50°23′39″N 56°32′17″W	6.8	29.5	Hydroelectric	
Castors River	50°54′47″N 56°52′44″W	8.0	34.4	Hydroelectric	
Cat Arm (Unit 3 expansion)	50°01′39″N 56°45′55″W	63	360	Hydroelectric	
Churchill Falls (expansion) (Note: Expansion to construct a two unit powerhouse at the tailrace generating 1,100 MW; and upgrade the existing 11 turbines to increase capacity by 550 MW.)	53°31′04″N 63°59′04″W	1,650	10,700	Hydroelectric	
Cloud River	50°48′01″N 56°17′46″W	14.5	72	Hydroelectric	
Conne River	47°55′23″N 55°41′16″W	7.8	35.7	Hydroelectric	
Crabbes River	48°04′32″N 58°39′18″W	31.7	143.7	Hydroelectric	
D'Espoir Brook	47°53′46″N 56°11′43″W	10.8	49.3	Hydroelectric	
Dolland Brook	47°44′12″N 56°35′47″W	14.7	67	Hydroelectric	
Dolland Brook #2	47°47′01″N 56°37′42″W	11.2	51.2	Hydroelectric	
Exploits River (Badger Chute)	48°56′20″N 55°58′45″W	24	154	Hydroelectric	
Exploits River (Red Indian Falls)	48°52′00″N 56°13′31″W	42	268	Hydroelectric	
Gisborne Lake	47°46′51″N 54°55′58″W	172		Hydroelectric	
Grand Falls (expansion) (Note: Expansion to utilize surplus flow and entire 43 m head between Goodyear's Dam and Exploits Canyon.)	48°55′36″N 55°40′06″W	21	125	Hydroelectric	
Great Rattling Brook	48°58′00″N 55°33′01″W	13.6	62.1	Hydroelectric	
Grey River	47°41′12″N 57°00′25″W	29.6	142	Hydroelectric	
Gull Island	52°57′54″N 61°22′24″W	2,700	11,900	Hydroelectric	
Holyrood Turbine Station	47°27′05″N 53°05′47″W	150		Combustion turbine	
Hooping Harbour	50°37′46″N 56°12′42″W	8.2	35.2	Hydroelectric	
Kings Harbour River	47°39′35″N 57°31′55″W	15.3	69.8	Hydroelectric	
Kitty's Brook	49°12′19″N 56°54′43″W	25.7	121	Hydroelectric	
Island Pond	48°22′53″N 56°22′56″W	36	186	Hydroelectric	
Little Falls	49°17′15″N 57°16′45″W	30.1	98	Hydroelectric	
Little Grand Lake	48°37′22″N 57°55′46″W	12	84	Hydroelectric	
Little Harbour Deep	50°14′27″N 56°34′31″W	33.4	144.1	Hydroelectric	
Lloyds River	48°25′27″N 57°27′17″W	17.3	82.6	Hydroelectric	
Long Harbour River (Fortune Bay)	47°54′42″N 54°55′20″W	12.3	56.2	Hydroelectric	
Main River	49°46′57″N 56°56′55″W	110	490	Hydroelectric	
Noel Paul's Brook	48°45′00″N 56°16′50″W	6.6	30.2	Hydroelectric	
Northern Arm River	50°31′50″N 56°21′52″W	23.6	102	Hydroelectric	
Northwest Arm Brook	47°45′30″N 57°54′45″W	8.4	38.2	Hydroelectric	
Northwest Gander River	48°35′27″N 55°27′26″W	9.5	43.1	Hydroelectric	
Paradise River	47°39′28″N 54°27′09″W	6.4	29.2	Hydroelectric	
Parsons Pond	49°56′30″N 57°30′05″W	9.6	46.2	Hydroelectric	
Piper's Hole	47°55′57″N 54°16′21″W	80	128	Hydroelectric	
Portland Creek	50°05′44″N 57°21′06″W	23	142	Hydroelectric	
Red Indian Brook (Grand Lake)	48°44′19″N 57°39′32″W	17.7	80.7	Hydroelectric	
River of Ponds	50°28′35″N 57°14′48″W	35	108	Hydroelectric	
Round Pond	48°07′01″N 56°00′38″W	18	139	Hydroelectric	
Southwest Brook	48°32′31″N 58°12′29″W	30	98	Hydroelectric	
Southwest River	48°17′05″N 54°11′14″W	8.1	37.1	Hydroelectric	
Steady Brook	48°56′51″N 57°49′25″W	5.6	24.2	Hydroelectric	
Terra Nova River (Clode Sound)	48°24′00″N 54°12′29″W	100	543	Hydroelectric	
Terra Nova River (Mollyguajeck Lake)	48°21′50″N 54°29′22″W	44	239	Hydroelectric	
Torrent River	50°37′15″N 57°01′09″W	24.8	112.4	Hydroelectric	
Upper Humber River	49°35′50″N 57°18′40″W	100	327	Hydroelectric	
Victoria River	48°43′24″N 56°41′08″W	10.6	48.5	Hydroelectric	
White Bear River	47°50′03″N 57°16′09″W	46.2	214	Hydroelectric	
Whites River (Upper Humber)	49°27′30″N 57°18′15″W	12	51.8	Hydroelectric	

== See also ==
- Churchill Falls (Labrador) Corporation Limited
- Newfoundland Power
- Energy in Canada
- List of power stations in Canada
