= List of dams and reservoirs in Canada =

This is a list of dams and water reservoirs in Canada.

== Alberta ==
- Bassano Dam
- Bearspaw Dam
- Bighorn Dam
- Brazeau Dam
- Cascade Dam
- Dickson Dam
- Ghost Dam
- Glenmore Reservoir
- Interlakes Dam
- Milk River Ridge Reservoir
- Oldman River Dam
- Three Sisters Dam
- Coal Lake Dam

== British Columbia ==
- Brilliant Dam
- Buntzen Lake Dam (Buntzen Lake)
- Cleveland Dam (Capilano Lake)
- Clowhom Dam (Clowhom Lake)
- Comox Lake Dam, Puntledge River
- Corra Linn Dam (Kootenay Lake)
- Coquitlam Dam (Coquitlam Lake)
- Daisy Lake Dam (Daisy Lake)
- Duncan Dam (Duncan Lake)
- Horseshoe Dam
- Elk Falls Dam (Elk River)
- John Hart Dam
- John Horgan Dam (Peace River)
- Jordan River Diversion Dam
- Hugh Keenleyside Dam (Arrow Lakes)
- Kenney Dam (Nechako Reservoir)
- Lajoie Dam (Downton Lake)
- Lower Bonnington Dam
- Mica Dam (Kinbasket Lake)
- Ocean Falls Dam
- Peace Canyon Dam (Dinosaur Lake on the Peace River)
- Powell River Dam (Powell Lake)
- Revelstoke Dam (Lake Revelstoke)
- Ruskin Dam (Hayward Lake)
- Seton Canal (a.k.a. Lillooet Canal)
- Seton Dam (Seton Lake)
- Seven Mile Dam
- Seymour Dam (Seymour River)
  - Seymour Falls Dam (Seymour River)
- South Slocan Dam
- Spillimacheen Dam
- Stave Falls Dam (Stave Lake)
- Terzaghi Dam a.k.a. Mission Dam (Carpenter Lake)
- Theodosia Dam
- Upper Bonnington Dam
- W. A. C. Bennett Dam (Lake Williston on the Peace River)
- Waneta Dam
- Wahleach Dam a.k.a. Jones Lake Dam (Wahleach Lake a.k.a. Jones Lake)
- Whatshan Dam

== Manitoba ==
- Grand Rapids Dam
- Great Falls Dam
- Jenpeg Dam
- Kettle Dam
- Keeyask Dam
- Knapp Dam
- Laurie River I Dam
- Laurie River II Dam
- Limestone Dam
- Long Spruce Dam
- McArthur Dam
- Nelson River and Churchill Diversion
- Rivers Dam
- Pine Falls Dam
- Pointe du Bois Dam
- Seven Sisters Dam
- Slave Falls Dam

== New Brunswick ==
- Beechwood Dam
- Grand Falls Generating Station
- Mactaquac Dam
- Tinker Dam
- Tobique Narrows Dam
- Milltown Generation Station

== Newfoundland and Labrador ==
- Smallwood Reservoir, Churchill Falls generating station, largest capacity in North America (5,428 MW installed, expandable to 9,252 MW); the world's second-largest reservoir.
- Ossokmanuan Reservoir, Twin Falls generating station (diverted to Churchill Falls)
- Cat Arm Reservoir, Cat Arm Hydroelectric Generating Station
- Star Lake, Star Lake generating station
- Hinds Lake, Hinds Lake Hydroelectric Generating Station
- Grand Lake, Deer Lake generating station
- Paradise River Dam, Paradise River Hydroelectric Generating Station (the largest concrete arch dam in Eastern North America)
- Grand Falls Dam, Exploits River generating station
- Bishops Falls Dam, Bishops Falls generating station

== Ontario ==
=== Large hydroelectric ===
- Decew Falls 2 (Twelve Mile Creek)
- Ontario Power (retired) (Niagara River)
- Sir Adam Beck 1 (Niagara River)
- Sir Adam Beck 2 (Niagara River)
- Sir Adam Beck Pump-Generating Station (Niagara River) upgrade complete
- Abitibi Canyon Generating Station (Abitibi River)
- Harmon (Mattagami River)
- Hound Chute (Montreal River)
- Indian Chute (Montreal River)
- Kipling (Mattagami River)
- Little Long (Mattagami River)
- Lower Notch (Montreal River)
- Lower Sturgeon Falls (Mattagami River)
- Matabitchuan (Montreal River)
- Otter Rapids Generating Station (Abitibi River)
- Sandy Falls (Mattagami River)
- Smoky Falls (Mattagami River)
- Wawaitin Falls (Mattagami River)
- Aguasabon (Aguasabon River)
- Alexander Falls (Nipigon River)
- Cameron Falls (Nipigon River)
- Caribou Falls (English River)
- Ear Falls (English River)
- Kakabeka Falls (Kaministiquia River)
- Manitou Falls (English River)
- Pine Portage (Nipigon River)
- Silver Falls (Dog River)
- Whitedog Falls (Winnipeg River)
- Arnprior (Madawaska River)
- Barrett Chute (Madawaska River)
- Calabogie (Madawaska River)
- Chats Falls Dam (Ottawa River)
- Chenaux Station (Ottawa River)
- Des Joachims (Ottawa River)
- Mountain Chute (Madawaska River)
- Otto Holden (Ottawa River)
- R.H. Saunders (St. Lawrence River)
- Stewartville (Madawaska River)
- Baysville Dam, Baysville

=== Small Hydroelectric ===
- Auburn (Otanabee River)
- Big Chute (Severn River)
- Big Eddy (Muskoka River)
- Bingham Chute (South River)
- Coniston (Wanapitei River)
- Crystal Falls (Sturgeon River)
- Fanshawe Dam (Thames River)
- Eugenia Dam (Eugenia)

=== Non hydroelectric ===
- Pittock Dam (Thames River)
- Wildwood Dam (Thames River)
- Crooks' Hollow Dam (Spencer Creek, Greensville)
- Claireville Flood Control dam and reservoir, Claireville Conservation Area (Humber River (Toronto)
- G Ross Lord Park Flood Control dam and reservoir, G Lord Ross Park West Branch, Don River (Toronto)
- Milne Dam and Reservoir, Milne Park Conservation Area - Markham (Rouge River (Toronto))
- McLeod Dam Green Energy Project (Moira River (Belleville))
- Orangeville Reservoir, Orangeville, Ontario - 332 acres lake is at the headwaters of the Credit River and Nottawasaga River

=== Planned Upgrades or Projects ===
- Umbata Falls Hydroelectric Project - Installed capacity of 23MW Q2 2008. This project in progress is a partnership of the Pic River First Nation and Innergex II Income Fund (on the White River, near Marathon).
- Island Falls Hydroelectric Project - Installed capacity of 20 mW Q4 2009. Canadian Hydro Developers Inc. Location: Smooth Rock Falls.
- Glen Miller Hydroelectric Project - Innergex II Income Fund (Trenton).

=== Hydroelectric generation under development ===
- Little Long, Harmon, Kipling and Smoky Falls - 450MW
- Lower Sturgeon, Sandy Falls and Wawaitin - 16MW
- Mattagami Lake Dam - 5MW

== Quebec ==
- Water-resource system Aux-Outardes
  - Outardes-2 Generating Station
  - Outardes-3 Generating Station
  - Outardes-4 Generating Station
- Water-resource system Bersimis
  - Pipmuacan Reservoir
    - Bersimis-1 Generating Station
  - Bersimis-2 generating station
- Water-resource system Gatineau and Lower Outaouais
  - Baskatong Reservoir
  - Bryson Generating Station
  - Cabonga Reservoir
  - Carillon Generating Station
  - Chelsea Generating Station
  - Chute-des-Chats
  - Hull-2
  - Paugan
  - Rapides-Farmers
  - Rivière-des-Prairies Generating Station
- Water-resource system La Grande Rivière
  - La Grande-1 generating station
  - Robert-Bourassa Reservoir
    - Robert-Bourassa generating station
    - La Grande-2-A generating station
  - La Grande-3 generating station
  - La Grande-4 generating station
  - Laforge-1 generating station
  - Laforge-2 generating station
  - Caniapiscau Reservoir
    - Brisay generating station
- Water-resource system Manicouagan
  - Hart-Jaune Generating Station
  - Manic-1 generating station
  - Manicouagan Reservoir
    - Jean-Lesage generating station
    - Manic-3 generating station
    - Manic-5 generating station
  - Manic-5-PA generating station
- Water-resource system Mitis
  - Mitis-1 Generating Station
  - Mitis-2 Generating Station
- Water-resource system Upper Outaouais
  - Bourque Dam and Dozois Reservoir
  - Première-Chute Generating Station
  - Rapide-Deux Generating Station
  - Rapide-Sept Generating Station
  - Rapides-des-Îles Generating Station
  - Rapides-des-Quinze Generating Station
- Water-resource system Rivière Véco
  - Lac-Robertson Generating Station
- Water-resource system Saint-François
  - Chute-Hemmings Generating Station
  - Drummondville Generating Station
- Water-resource system St-Lawrence river
  - Beauharnois Hydroelectric Generating Station
  - Des Cèdres Generating Station
- Water-resource system Saint-Maurice
  - Beaumont generating station
  - Gouin Reservoir
  - Grand-Mère Generating Station
  - La Gabelle Generating Station
  - La Tuque Generating Station
  - Rapide-Blanc Generating Station
  - Saint-Narcisse Generating Station
  - Shawinigan-2 Generating Station
  - Shawinigan-3 Generating Station
  - Trenche Generating Station

== Saskatchewan ==
- Admiral Dam
- Arm Lake Dam (also known as Craik Dam)
- Avonlea Dam
- Boundary Dam
- Blackstrap North Dam
- Blackstrap South Dam
- Braddock Dam
- Bradwell East Dam
- Bradwell West Dam
- Brightwater Creek Dam
- Broderick North Dam
- Broderick West Dam
- Buffalo Pound Dam
- Candle Lake Dam
- Chicken Lake Dam
- Cowan Lake Dam
- Craven Dam
- Crooked Lake Dam
- Darmody Dam
- Dellwood Brook Dam
- Duncairn Dam
- Eastend Dam
- E.B. Campbell Hydroelectric Station
- Echo Lake Dam
- Francois-Finlay Dam
- Gardiner Dam
- Gouverneur Dam
- Grant Devine Dam
- Island Falls Dam
- Jackfish River control structure
- Katepwa Dam
- Kingsway Dam
- Kipahigan Lake Dam
- Lac la Plonge Dam
- Lac la Ronge Dam
- Makwa Lake Control
- Moose Mountain Dam
- Moosomin Dam
- Opuntia Lake Control
- Pike Lake Water Supply
- Qu'Appelle River Dam
- Rafferty Dam
- Round Lake Dam
- Scott Dam
- Spruce River Dam
- Star City Dam
- Summercove Dam
- Tee-Pee Creek Dam
- Theodore Dam
- Valeport Dam
- Wascana Lake Weir
- West Poplar Dam
- Whitesand Dam
- Zelma Dam

== Yukon ==
- Schwatka Lake
- Aishihik Lake

== See also ==
- List of generating stations in Canada
