= Newfoundland and Labrador Hydro =

Energy generation company in parts of Canada and the United States

- Formerly: Newfoundland and Labrador Power Commission
- Type: Crown Corporation
- Industry: Electricity generation & distribution
- Founded: St. John's, Newfoundland and Labrador (1954)
- Headquarters: St. John's, Newfoundland and Labrador, Canada
- Key people: Jennifer Williams, President
- Products: Electricity
- Revenue: $493,500,000 CAD
- Owner: Government of Newfoundland and Labrador
- Number of employees: 1,150 (2005)
- Subsidiaries: Churchill Falls (Labrador) Corporation Limited; Lower Churchill Development Corporation Limited; Gull Island Power Company Limited; Twin Falls Power Corporation Limited
- Website: www.nlh.nl.ca

Newfoundland and Labrador Hydro (NL Hydro), commonly known as Hydro, is a provincial Crown corporation that manages the generation, transmission and distribution of electricity in Newfoundland and Labrador, as well as portions of Quebec and the north-eastern areas of the United States. Between 2007 and 2021, NL Hydro was a subsidiary of the provincial Crown-owned energy holding company Nalcor Energy.

Newfoundland and Labrador Hydro's installed generating capacity, 8034 megawatts (MW), is the fourth largest of all utility companies in Canada. Generating assets consist of 16 hydroelectric plants, including the Churchill Falls hydroelectric plant, which is the second largest underground power station in the world, with a rated capacity of 5,428 MW of power, one oil-fired plant, four gas turbines and 26 diesel plants. Every year, Hydro generates and transmits over 80% of the electrical energy consumed by Newfoundlanders and Labradorians – over 6,487 GWh of energy in 2004. Hydro also distributes power directly to 35,000 customers in rural Newfoundland and Labrador.

In 1975, the Newfoundland and Labrador Power Commission, a crown corporation originally established to assist in rural electrification, was renamed Newfoundland and Labrador Hydro Corporation.

Newfoundland and Labrador Hydro is the parent company of the Hydro Group of Companies, which comprises

- Churchill Falls (Labrador) Corporation Limited (CFLCo)
- Lower Churchill Development Corporation Limited (LCDC)
- Gull Island Power Company Limited (GIPCo)
- Twin Falls Power Corporation Limited (TwinCo)

== Grid operations, services and connections ==
=== Atlantic power connections ===
The Nova Scotia government commissioned (from SNC-Lavalin) a study in 2009 to consider an Atlantic-wide regional electricity market operator.

A $6.2 billion deal between Newfoundland and Labrador's Nalcor Energy and Halifax, Nova Scotia-based Emera to develop Muskrat Falls was announced in November 2010. On November 30, 2012, a federal loan guarantee deal for financing of the project was signed by Prime Minister Stephen Harper, Newfoundland and Labrador premier Kathy Dunderdale and Nova Scotia premier Darrell Dexter. On December 17, 2012, the provincial government announced project sanction. Emera received approval to proceed with the Maritime Link from the Nova Scotia Utility and Review Board in 2013. Financial close for the loan guarantee occurred in late 2013. On September 23, 2020, the first unit at Muskrat Falls was synced to the electricity grid in Labrador. Power from the remaining three units was originally expected to come online in the fall of 2021.

== Generating facilities ==
Muskrat Falls Generating Station

Holyrood Thermal Generating Station

=== Hydroelectric Generating Stations ===
==== Labrador (6,271 MW) ====
- Churchill Falls Generating Station, 5428 MW
- Muskrat Falls Generating Station, 824 MW
- Menihek Hydroelectric Generating Station, 19 MW
- Twin Falls Hydroelectric Generating Station, 225 MW (non-operating)
- Gull Island Generation Project, 2250 MW (in development)
- Mary's Harbour, 240 kW

==== Newfoundland (1,254 MW) ====
- Bay d'Espoir Hydroelectric Generating Facility
- Cat Arm Hydroelectric Generating Station
- Granite Canal Hydroelectric Generating Station
- Hinds Lake Hydroelectric Generating Station
- Paradise River Hydroelectric Generating Station
- Upper Salmon Hydroelectric Generating Station
- Roddickton Hydroelectric generating station
- Snooks Arm Hydroelectric Generating Station
- Venams Bight Hydroelectric Generating Station
- Star Lake Hydroelectric Generating Station
- Exploits River (Grand Falls) Hydroelectric Generating Station
- Exploits River (Bishops Falls) Hydroelectric Generating Station

==== Non-Utility Generators ====
- Rattling Brook Hydroelectric Generating Station (Newfoundland Power)
- Deer Lake Hydroelectric Generating Station (Corner Brook Pulp and Paper)
- Corner Brook Stream Hydroelectric Generating Station (Corner Brook Pulp and Paper)

=== Thermal (Diesel) Generating Stations ===
==== Labrador (32.8 MW) ====
- Happy Valley-Goose Bay
- Mud Lake
- Black Tickle
- Cartwright
- Charlottetown
- Hopedale
- L'Anse-au-Loup
- Makkovik
- Mary's Harbour
- Nain
- Norman's Bay
- Port Hope Simpson
- Postville
- Rigolet
- St. Lewis
- Williams Harbour

==== Newfoundland (23.5 MW) ====
- Francois
- Grey River
- Hawke's Bay
- McCallum
- Ramea (Wind Diesel)
- St. Anthony
- St. Brendan's

=== Thermal (Oil) Generating Stations ===
==== Newfoundland (490 MW) ====
- Holyrood Thermal Generating Station

=== Gas Turbine Generating Stations ===
==== Labrador (27 MW) ====
- Happy Valley-Goose Bay

==== Newfoundland (223.5 MW) ====
- Hardwoods 47°31′27″N 52°50′49″W
- Holyrood 47°27′10.14″N 53°05′43.73″W
- Stephenville 48°32′08″N 58°31′04″W

=== Solar Generating Stations ===
- Mary's Harbour, 190 kW

== Highlights in the history of Newfoundland and Labrador Hydro ==
- 1947 – George Desbarats hired as an engineering consultant to undertake a water power survey
- 1949 – Premier Joseph R. Smallwood promised to create a public utility
- 1954 – On June 22, the Power Commission Act was passed creating the Newfoundland Power Commission, what would become Newfoundland and Labrador Hydro
- 1956 – George Desbarats began as Commissioner and sole employee of the Newfoundland Power Commission.
- 1956 – British Newfoundland Development Corporation (BRINCO) was formed to explore development at Bay d'Espoir and later Churchill Falls
- 1958 – Premier Smallwood announced his Rural Electrification Plan
- 1958 – John Ryan succeeds George Desbarats as Chair of the Commission
- 1961 – Frank Newbury becomes Chair of the Commission
- 1963 – Government passed the Rural Electrification Act, which established power distribution districts (PDDs) to assist non-incorporated municipalities to access electricity where feasible
- 1964 – George Hobbs becomes Chair
- 1964 – Bay d'Espoir Hydro Electric Development begins
- 1965 – Government signed an agreement with Newfoundland Light and Power to give it ownership of the rural lines connected to its system. Any future lines would be jointly constructed.
- 1965 – The Newfoundland and Labrador Power Commission Act replaced the 1954 Power Commission Act and created the Newfoundland and Labrador Rural Electrical Authority (REA). The Act also provided for the establishment of a province-wide electrical code.
- 1966 – Bay d'Espoir Stage 2 began construction
- 1968 – Construction on Holyrood Thermal Generating Station began
- 1969 – CFLCo and Hydro-Québec sign the Upper Churchill Falls power contract
- 1971 – First power from Churchill Falls delivered to Quebec
- 1974 – Churchill Falls project was complete.
- 1974 – Wallace Read replaces George Hobbs as Chair of the Power Commission.
- 1974 - Government acquires part ownership of CFLCo from Brinco
- 1975 – Government reforms the Commission into the Newfoundland and Labrador Hydro-Electric Corporation (Hydro)
- 1975 – Denis Groom appointed as president and CEO of Hydro
- 1975 – Government appoints Douglas Fullerton as the first Chairman of the Board of the Hydro Group of Companies.
- 1978 – Stage 3 of the Bay d'Espoir project was officially opened
- 1978 – Victor Young replaced Denis Groom as chairman and CEO of Hydro
- 1980 – Hinds Lake Hydro Electric Development came on stream
- 1981 – Roddickton hydro generating station opened
- 1983 – Upper Salmon Hydro Electric Development plant opened
- 1985 – Cat Arm Hydro Electric Development opened making it the second largest hydro project on Newfoundland.
- 1985 – Cyril Abery replaced Vic Young as chairman and CEO
- 1989 – Paradise River Hydro Electric Development became operational
- 1989 – Hydro Place became the official headquarters for the Hydro Group of Companies
- 1991 – Cyril Abery resigned as chairman and CEO. He was replaced by David Mercer as president and CEO, while James Chalker assumed the duties of chairman of the board.
- 1995 – William Wells replaced David Mercer as president and CEO of Hydro.
- 1998 – Two private hydro projects at Star Lake and Rattle Brook were put into service
- 2003 – New 40 MW Granite Canal Hydro Electric Development officially opened
- 2019 – Jennifer Williams replaces Jim Hynes as President of Hydro
- 2021 June 23 – Premier Andrew Furey announced Nalcor Energy would be dismantled and folded into Newfoundland and Labrador Hydro.
- 2023 - completion of the 1100km transmission link to Newfoundland as part of the Muskrat Falls. Originally approved in 2012 with an anticipated price tag of around $7.4 billion, the costs of the project had increased to more than $13 billion.

== See also ==
- List of generating stations in Newfoundland and Labrador
- Newfoundland Power
- Fortis Inc.
