= Churchill Falls Generating Station =

Hydroelectric power station in Labrador, Canada

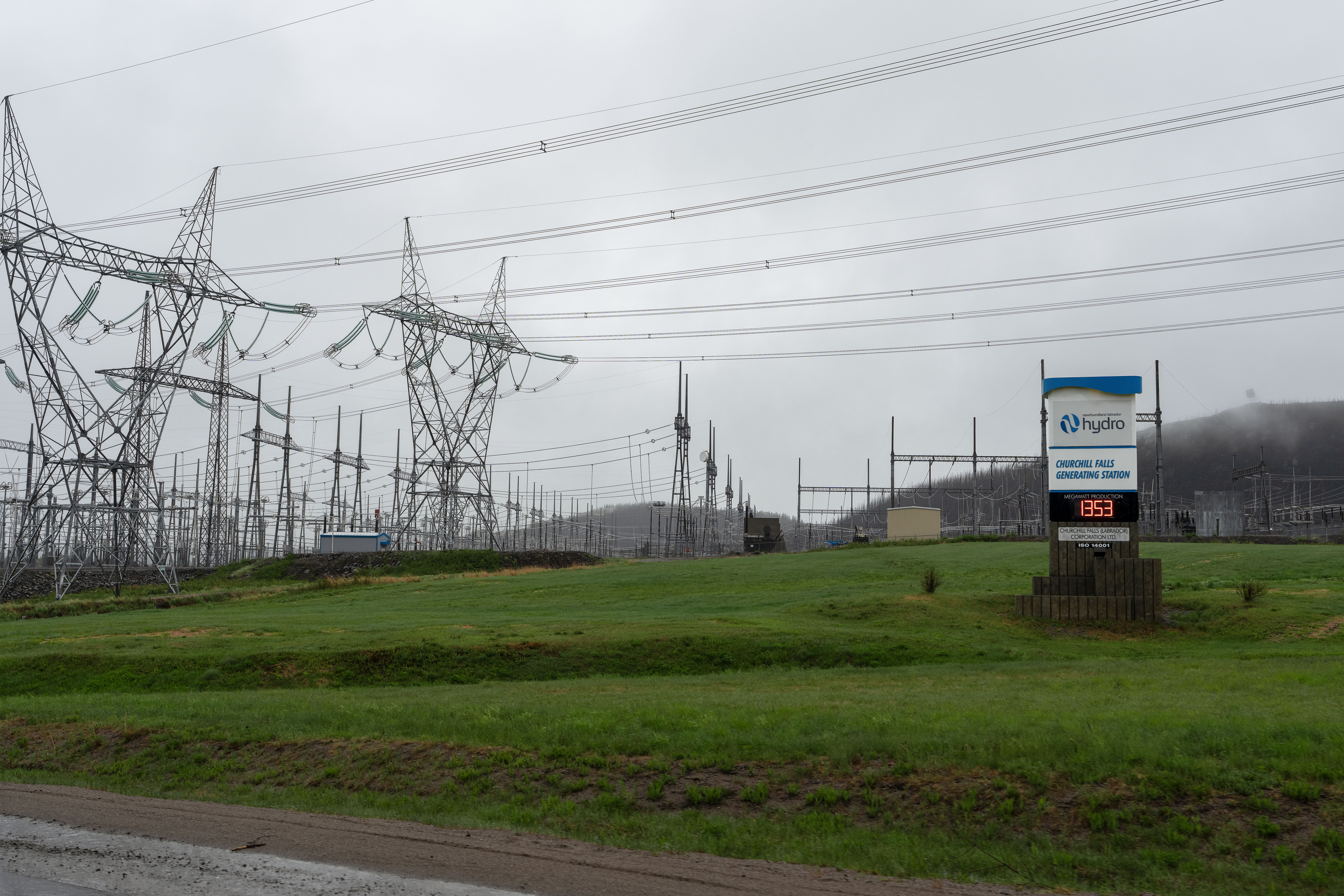
- Churchill Falls surface-level switchyard

- Location within Newfoundland and Labrador
- Location: Newfoundland and Labrador, Canada
- Coordinates: 53°31′43.45″N 63°57′57.15″W
- Construction began: 1967
- Opening date: 1974
- Construction cost: 946 million CAD
- Owner: CF(L)Co

Dam and spillways
- Type of dam: 88 rock-filled dikes
- Impounds: Churchill River
- Length: 64 km (40 mi)
- Dam volume: 2,200,000 m^{3} (2,900,000 yd^{3})

Reservoir
- Creates: Smallwood Reservoir; Ossokmanuan Reservoir
- Total capacity: 32.64 km^{3} (1.153×10^{12} ft^{3})
- Catchment area: 71,750 km^{2} (27,700 mi^{2})
- Surface area: 6,988 km^{2} (2,698 mi^{2})

Power Station
- Operator: CF(L)Co
- Commission date: 1971–1974
- Hydraulic head: 312.4 m (1,025 ft)
- Turbines: 11
- Installed capacity: 5,428 MW
- Capacity factor: 73.6%
- Annual generation: 35,000 GWh (130,000 TJ)
- Website nlhydro.com/about-us/our-electricity-system/our-generation-assets/

The Churchill Falls Generating Station is a hydroelectric underground power station in Labrador, Canada. At 5,428 MW, it is the sixteenth largest in the world, and the second-largest in Canada, after the Robert-Bourassa generating station in northwestern Quebec.

Rather than a single large dam, the plant's reservoir is contained by 88 dikes, totalling 64 km in length. The Smallwood Reservoir has a capacity of 33 cubic kilometres in a catchment area of about 72,000 square kilometres, an area larger than the Republic of Ireland. It drops over 305 metres to the site of the plant's 11 turbines.

The plant's power house was hewn from solid granite 300 metres underground. It is about 300 metres long and as high as a 15-story building.

The station cost almost CA$1 billion (equivalent to $8.1 billion in 2025) to build in 1970. Commissioned from 1971 to 1974, it is owned and operated by the Churchill Falls Labrador Corporation Limited, a joint venture between Newfoundland and Labrador Hydro (65.8%) and Hydro-Québec (34.2%). Workers at the station live in the purpose-built company town of Churchill Falls.

== Toponymy ==
Originally called the Mishta-shipu (Big River) by the Innu, in 1821 the river was called Hamilton by Captain William Martin of HMS Clinker, after Sir Charles Hamilton the governor of Newfoundland from 1818 to 1823. The waterfall itself was called Grand Falls. In 1965, after the death of Winston Churchill the falls, river, town, and generating station were all renamed again.

== History ==
=== Early investigations ===
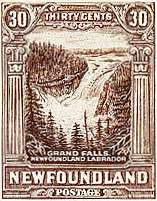
In 1931, the Dominion of Newfoundland issued a 30-cent stamp depicting the falls.

In 1915, Wilfred Thibaudeau surveyed the Labrador Plateau. He designed a channel scheme to divert water before it arrived at the falls. The scheme would use the natural capacity of the drainage basin, which covers over 23,300 mi^{2} (60,000 km^{2}), eliminating the need for the construction of dams. The advantage of the site was the river's drop of more than 300 metres in less than 32 km, and steady supply of water. These findings were confirmed in a 1947 survey, but development did not proceed due to the remoteness of the site and the distance from markets for the power.

In 1954, the region was opened up by the completion of the Quebec North Shore and Labrador Railway which runs north from Sept-Îles, Quebec 575 km north through Labrador to Schefferville, Quebec. In 1963, a 225 MW generating station was built at Twin Falls to supply power to iron mining industries in western Labrador.

=== Boundary with Canada and Quebec ===
Prior to 1949, Newfoundland was a nation separate from Canada known as the Dominion of Newfoundland, and the Newfoundland-Quebec boundary was an international border. However in 1949, Newfoundland and Labrador became a province of Canada so that the Newfoundland and Labrador–Quebec border became an interprovincial border.

=== Finance ===
Canada is a federation where legal authority is split between the federal and provincial governments; natural resources such as lumber, petroleum, and inland waterways are under the jurisdiction of provincial, rather than the federal government. Since Labrador had no internal market for the power, the Government of Newfoundland had to negotiate with neighbouring Quebec to export the energy. Controversy over the location of the then-international border on the Labrador Peninsula added to the difficulties of negotiating between Newfoundland and Quebec. A country at the time, Newfoundland disputed the border location with the Government of Canada. The Judicial Committee of the Privy Council in the United Kingdom ruled in favour of the Dominion of Newfoundland in 1927, an unpopular judgment in Quebec. A member of the Legislative Assembly of Quebec, Jacques Dumoulin, stated that for Canada the best judges are Canadians. The Quebec government did not accept this judgement as seen by borders on maps issued in 1939 by the Quebec Ministry of Energy and Natural Resources. Certain newspapers called for a takeover of the territory.

In 1953 after Newfoundland and Labrador had become a Canadian province, the British Newfoundland Development Corporation (BRINCO) was formed for the purpose of exploiting Labrador's resources. In 1958, it created a subsidiary, the Hamilton Falls (Labrador) Corporation Limited to develop the hydroelectric project. Through this subsidiary BRINCO obtained a 99 year monopoly on the sale of Labrador hydro power.

BRINCO could not get funding for the generating station without a guaranteed market for its power. In 1963, Quebec nationalized all of its hydro-electric facilities, and proposed to Newfoundland that it do the same with the Hamilton Falls project, which Premier Joey Smallwood refused. BRINCO explored alternatives to sending the electricity to neighbouring Quebec, including sending it to New Brunswick and asking for federal intervention. This proposal was known as the Anglo-Saxon route. However, the only practical solution was to negotiate an interprovincial agreement with Quebec. By 1969, after 16 years of attempts to finance the project, BRINCO was in dire financial straits whereas Quebec was flush with money, further strengthening Quebec's negotiating position. In the end BRINCO would sell 90 percent of the power to Hydro Quebec, at a fixed price, over 40 years renewable for a further 25.

At the time BRINCO was praised for having built the station with no public money from Newfoundland, while Hydro-Québec assumed nearly all the financial risk. It is unlikely that BRINCO would have found other investors willing to take on that risk. In 1981, it made a good return on the investment at almost no risk.

=== Construction ===
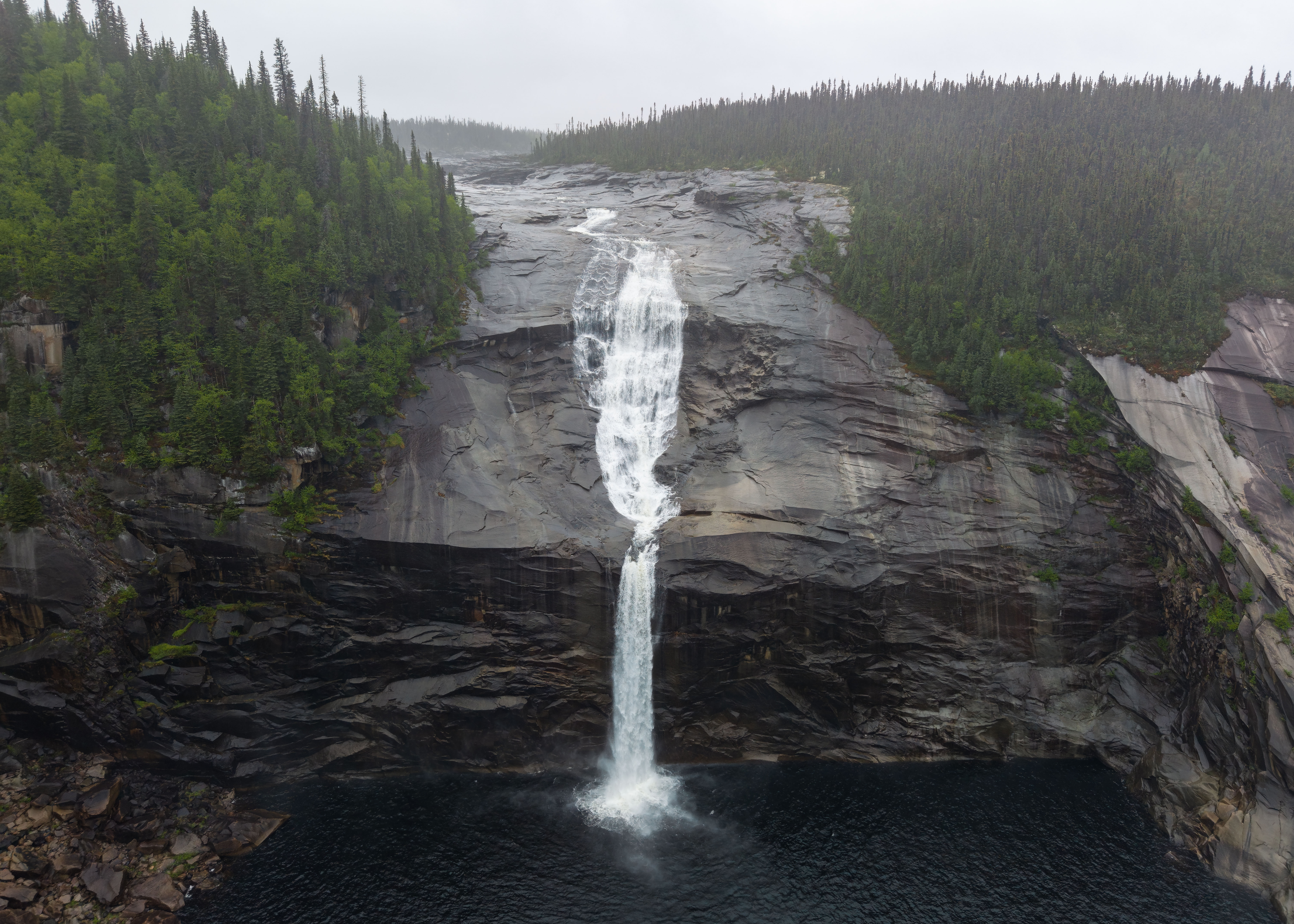
Churchill Falls as it appeared in 2026, six decades after the water was redirected.

Construction started in July 1967, at the time the largest civil engineering project ever undertaken in North America and the largest underground power station in the world.

After five years of non-stop work by 6,300 workers, the first two generating units began delivering power in 1971, almost half a year ahead of schedule. In 1974, the station went into full-time production.

== Technical characteristics ==
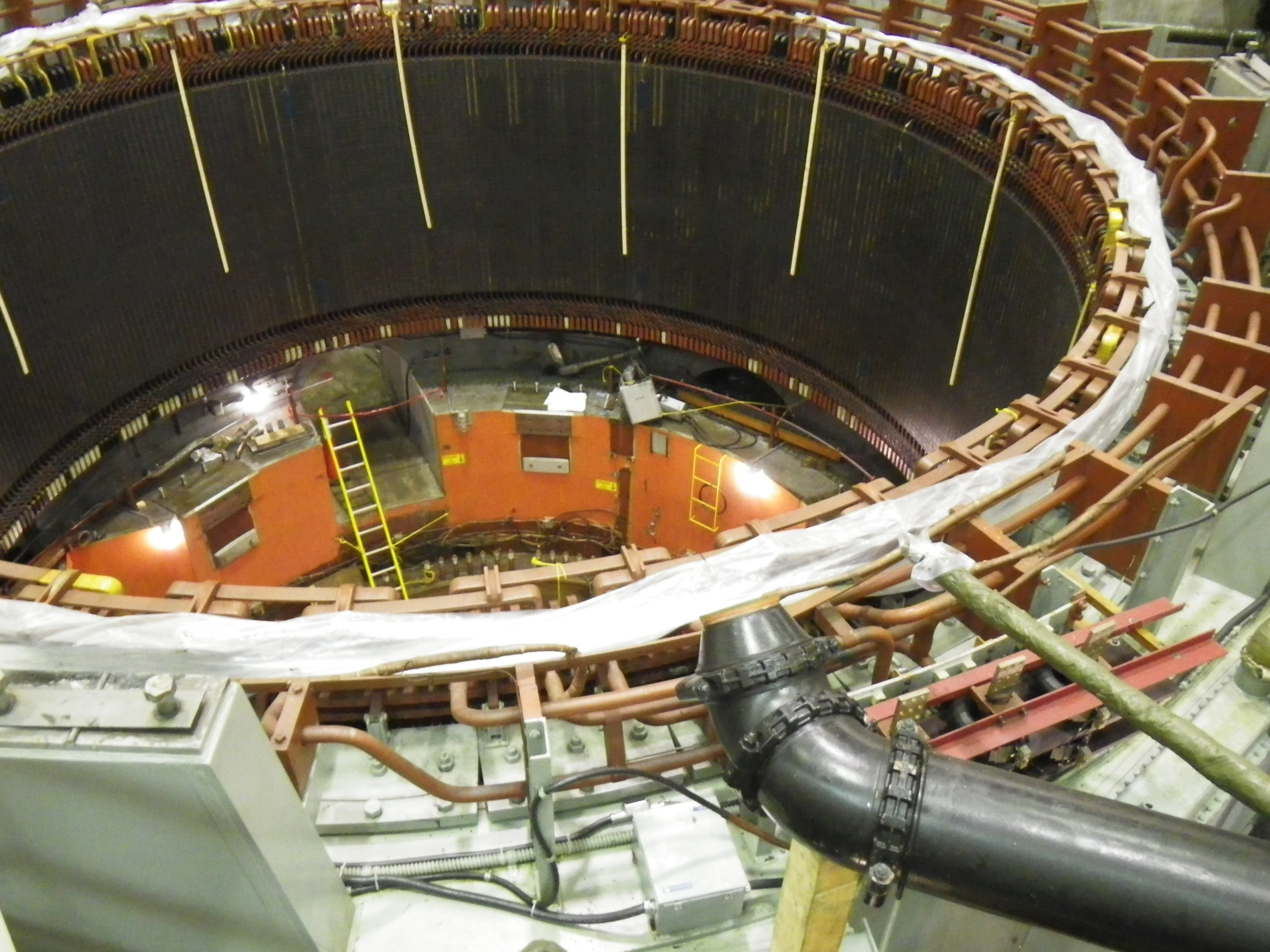
One of the main generators of the station during repairs

The drainage area for the Churchill River includes much of western and central Labrador. Ossokmanuan Reservoir, originally developed as part of the Twin Falls Power System also drains into this system. Churchill River's natural drainage area covers over 60,000 km^{2} (23,000 sq mi). Dyking Orma and Sail lakes brought the total to 72,000 km^{2} (28,000 sq mi). Studies showed this drainage area collected 410 mm (16 in) of rainfall plus 391 cm (154 in) of snowfall annually equalling 12.5 mi^{3} (52 km^{3}) of water per year; more than enough to meet the project's needs.

Total natural drop of the water starting at Ashuanipi Lake and ending at Lake Melville is 1,735 ft (529 m). As a comparison, the water starting 30 km (19 mi) upriver until it enters the power plant drops over 1,000 ft (300 m).

The machine hall, hewn from solid granite, is almost 300 m (980 ft) underground. The 1,800,000 cubic metres of rock excavated was used in roads, building the town site, and as dike material. The hall is about 300 m (980 ft) long, up to 25 m (82 ft) wide and about 50 m (160 ft) high. It houses 11 generating units. The Francis turbine wheels are cast of stainless steel and weigh 73 tonnes each.

Water is contained by a reservoir created not by a single large dam, but by a series of 88 dikes that have a total length of 64 km (40 mi). The reservoir, later known as Smallwood Reservoir, covers 5,700 km^{2} (2,200 sq mi) and can contain more than 28 km^{3} (1 trillion ft^{3}) of water.

== Post-construction legal challenges ==
In Newfoundland and Labrador, the contract between Churchill Falls (Labrador) Corporation (CFLCo) and Hydro-Québec has created a great deal of resentment. Events unforeseen at the time of the 1969 negotiation have greatly increased Hydro-Quebec's profit margin on the fixed price of energy from the station.

The Government of Newfoundland and Labrador has unsuccessfully challenged the 1969 contract in court. In November 2018, the Supreme Court of Canada rejected a bid to force Hydro-Québec to reopen the contract before 2041, deciding that the high profits of Hydro-Québec did not justify re-opening the contract. The majority decision held that the unforeseeability of future energy price increases was a risk that the CFLCo had assumed when the contract was signed and the court could not force the parties to re-open the contract. Gascon additionally said that unforeseeability would justify overturning the contract only if it made the contract less beneficial to one party and not in this case, where it merely made the contract more beneficial to one party (Hydro-Québec). [Falls (Labrador) Corp. v. Hydro‑Québec], 2018 SCC 37238, 428 DLR (4th) 1, AZ-51540971, [2018] EXP 2950, EYB 2018-303592, [2018] SCJ No 46 (QL), Canada

In 2019, Quebec's highest court, the Quebec Court of Appeal ruled that Hydro-Quebec's right to sell Churchill Falls energy had a monthly cap, simplifying the management of water resources for the Lower Churchill Project's Muskrat Falls station.

=== Legal cases brought forward by the Innu Nation ===
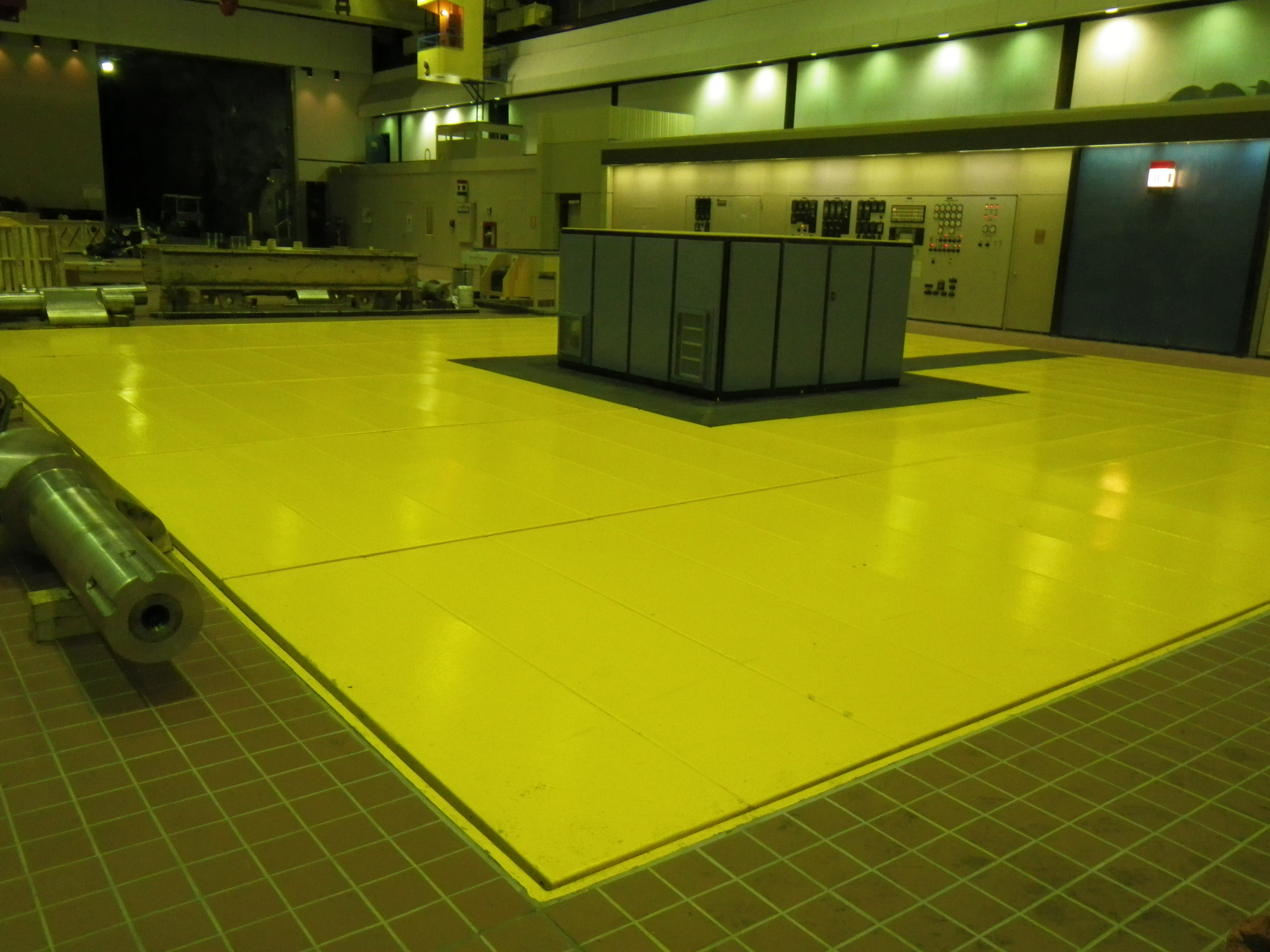
One of the 11 underground units

The Churchill Falls hydroelectric plant development was undertaken in the absence of any agreement with the Innu people, but has resulted in significant damage to their traditional territory. The plant caused flooding of over 5,000 km^{2} (1,900 mi^{2}), which damaged the habitats of many animals, disrupted caribou migratory routes, and drowned wildlife such as beavers. Furthermore, Innu burial sites and hunting grounds were destroyed, causing irreparable damage to the traditions and livelihoods of the Innu people. A 2016 study commissioned by the Nunatsiavut government — the government of the Labrador Inuit — concluded that the flooding produced methylmercury and could contaminate the local water, food sources, and health of the Innu in the region. These negative impacts may infringe on the aboriginal rights and treaty rights of the Innu people.

In February 2010, the government of Newfoundland and Labrador and the Innu Nation initialed an agreement to compensate for the negative impacts of the Churchill Falls plant. The agreement offered the Labrador Innu hunting rights within 34,000 km^{2} (13,000 mi^{2}) of land, plus $2 million annually in compensation from Nalcor Energy.

In October 2020, the Innu Nation of Labrador filed a $4 billion claim against Hydro-Québec through the Supreme Court of Newfoundland and Labrador. The amount represents approximately 5% of Hydro-Quebec's estimated $80 billion profits over the 50 years that the hydroelectric plant has been in operation. Furthermore, the Innu Nation have united with First Nations in Canada and the United States to oppose Hydro-Québec's planned transmission line to Massachusetts. A large portion of the energy for this project would be generated in the Churchill Falls hydroelectric plant.

The timing of this lawsuit comes as the Innu Nation seeks to formalize a land claims agreement with the Government of Canada.

== 2024 Churchill Falls Memorandum of Understanding (MOU) ==
The history of the Churchill Falls Memorandum of Understanding (MOU) is best understood as the latest chapter in Newfoundland and Labrador's decades-long effort to address what many in the province regard as the inequities of the 1969 Churchill Falls Power Contract. The original agreement, signed on May 12, 1969, between Churchill Falls (Labrador) Corporation (CFLCo) and Hydro-Québec committed most of the output of the Churchill Falls generating station to Hydro-Québec under fixed-price terms extending until 2041. Although the arrangement made construction of the project possible, rising electricity prices over subsequent decades transformed the contract into a source of political and economic controversy because Hydro-Québec was able to market Churchill Falls power at substantially higher prices while Newfoundland and Labrador received revenues based on the original rates. Numerous attempts to alter or challenge the arrangement followed, including the Recall Case, the Water Rights Reversion Case, the Good Faith Case, and disputes surrounding the 2016 renewal period, but none fundamentally changed the contract. As the 2041 expiry approached, attention increasingly shifted from litigation toward negotiation and long-term planning.

A major turning point occurred in May 2022 when the Government of Newfoundland and Labrador established the Churchill River Management Expert Panel, commonly referred to as the 2041 Panel. The panel was created in response to recommendations from the Muskrat Falls Inquiry, which emphasized the need for early preparation ahead of the expiration of the existing Churchill Falls contract in 2041. The panel examined potential strategies for maximizing the value of the Churchill River, including increased domestic use of hydroelectric power, expanded exports to external markets, and the possibility of restructuring the province's relationship with Hydro-Québec. After completing its work in 2023, the panel delivered strategic recommendations that became the foundation for subsequent negotiations.

Following the panel's work, the provincial government appointed a negotiating team consisting of Karl Smith, Newfoundland and Labrador Hydro President and CEO Jennifer Williams, and Deputy Minister Denis Mahoney. In April 2023, the government and Newfoundland and Labrador Hydro approved a principles-based mandate authorizing discussions with Hydro-Québec on replacing the existing Churchill Falls arrangement. A second mandate followed in June 2024, expanding negotiations to include development of the Gull Island hydroelectric project, a long-discussed proposal on the Churchill River that Hydro-Québec viewed as strategically important. According to the later Independent Review Committee, the objective was not merely to prepare for 2041 but to pursue a comprehensive new energy relationship encompassing existing Churchill Falls assets, future hydro development, and major transmission infrastructure.

On December 12, 2024, negotiations culminated in the signing of a historic Memorandum of Understanding by Newfoundland and Labrador Hydro, Hydro-Québec, and CFLCo. The agreement was publicly announced by Premier Andrew Furey and Québec Premier François Legault as a transformative new partnership intended to replace the 1969 contract seventeen years before its expiry. The MOU proposed a new 51-year power purchase agreement extending to 2075, a major increase in revenues from Churchill Falls power, upgrades and expansion of the existing generating station, construction of a new 2,250 MW generating station at Gull Island, and development of new transmission infrastructure in Labrador and Québec. The provincial government estimated that the overall package would generate approximately $225 billion to $227 billion in total nominal revenues over the life of the agreements. The announcement was accompanied by an acknowledgement agreement with the Innu Nation recognizing provincial commitments under the New Dawn Agreement.

The MOU itself contained several major components. First, it would terminate and replace the existing Churchill Falls power contract with a new 51-year arrangement using a market-linked pricing formula rather than the fixed-price model established in 1969. Second, it proposed a Churchill Falls Upgrades project that would replace turbine-generators and increase capacity by approximately 550 MW. Third, it outlined a Churchill Falls Expansion project involving construction of a new powerhouse that would add approximately 1,100 MW of capacity. Fourth, it proposed creation of a new 60/40 joint venture between Newfoundland and Labrador Hydro and Hydro-Québec to develop and operate Gull Island. Finally, it included new transmission infrastructure to connect existing and future hydro developments to markets. The agreement also envisioned increasing Newfoundland and Labrador Hydro's access to Churchill Falls power over time.

Following the announcement, the Furey government undertook an extensive public campaign to build support for the agreement. A special session of the House of Assembly was held in January 2025 to examine the MOU in detail. During four days of debate, members questioned Newfoundland and Labrador Hydro executives, legal advisors, and external consultants involved in the negotiations. On January 9, 2025, the House voted in favour of continuing negotiations toward definitive agreements with Hydro-Québec. The motion passed with support from Liberal, New Democratic Party, and Independent members, while Progressive Conservative members left the chamber before the vote, arguing that a more independent review was required before further commitments were made.

The direction of the project changed significantly following the 2025 provincial election, which brought the Progressive Conservatives under Tony Wakeham to power. The new government had campaigned on concerns regarding the MOU and promised a more rigorous assessment before approving any final agreements. On December 15, 2025, Wakeham established the Churchill River Independent Review Committee (IRC), chaired by Chris Huskilson and including Guy Holburn and Michael Wilson. The committee was tasked with determining whether the MOU was in the best long-term interests of Newfoundland and Labrador and was empowered to conduct a comprehensive examination of both the content of the agreement and the negotiation process that produced it.

The IRC delivered its final report on April 30, 2026, and its conclusions profoundly reshaped the public conversation. Although the committee recognized substantial financial and economic benefits associated with the MOU, it concluded that the agreement "in its current form is not in the public interest." The committee identified a number of concerns, including limited long-term access to Churchill Falls power for Newfoundland and Labrador after 2041, lack of guaranteed transmission access through Québec to reach external markets, problematic pricing structures, governance arrangements that continued to provide significant influence to Hydro-Québec, and risks associated with the proposed Gull Island ownership model. The committee estimated that the real net present value of the agreement was approximately $31 billion rather than the nominal $227 billion frequently highlighted by government communications. Nevertheless, the IRC acknowledged that the proposed agreement could generate meaningful benefits if significant improvements were made.

Following release of the report, Premier Wakeham stated that the province would not abandon development of Churchill Falls and Gull Island but would instead seek material improvements through renewed negotiations. A new negotiating team consisting of Barry Perry, Jerome Kennedy, and Jennifer Williams was appointed, and discussions resumed with Hydro-Québec during the summer of 2026. One of the most significant issues identified by the IRC was Newfoundland and Labrador's inability under the original MOU to secure guaranteed transmission rights through Hydro-Québec's network to external markets. During meetings between Premier Wakeham and Québec Premier Christine Fréchette, negotiators focused heavily on addressing this deficiency.

By August 2026, reports emerged that a revised agreement was close to completion. According to sources familiar with negotiations, the proposed replacement for the 2024 MOU would include guaranteed transmission access of approximately 985 MW through Hydro-Québec's network, enabling Newfoundland and Labrador to market electricity directly into other jurisdictions. Former deputy minister Ron Penney described the provision as a significant departure from the original MOU because the earlier agreement had not secured guaranteed access to Québec's transmission system. This development directly addressed one of the most important concerns raised by the Independent Review Committee and reflected the evolving effort to ensure that Newfoundland and Labrador could maximize the long-term value of Churchill River resources while avoiding some of the limitations that had characterized both the 1969 contract and aspects of the original 2024 MOU.

=== August 17, 2026 DCIA Deal ===
On August 17, 2026, Newfoundland and Labrador, Quebec, and the Government of Canada announced a substantially revised agreement concerning the Churchill River system. The three parties signed a Definitive Cooperation and Implementation Agreement (DCIA). At a public event in St. John's, Prime Minister Mark Carney, Premier Tony Wakeham, and Premier Christine Fréchette unveiled what Carney described as one of the largest clean-energy investments in North American history. The package combined hydroelectric upgrades, transmission infrastructure, mining-related investments, and a major proposed wind-energy project in Labrador. Together, these initiatives were projected to deliver approximately 14,000 MW of renewable electricity, support more than 20,000 construction jobs, and significantly expand eastern Canada's energy infrastructure.

A key feature of the new arrangement was the reworking of the economic benefits available to Newfoundland and Labrador. The province's share of the agreement was estimated at $49 billion in 2026 net present value, representing an increase of approximately $13 billion over the 2024 Memorandum of Understanding. In nominal terms, the package was valued at approximately $273 billion. Newfoundland and Labrador was also projected to receive roughly $10 billion in earlier cash flows prior to 2041, improving the province's financial position before the expiry of the original Churchill Falls contract.

The power-sharing provisions were also significantly revised. Newfoundland and Labrador secured access to up to 2,350 MW of hydroelectric generation from Churchill Falls and Gull Island, compared with 1,990 MW under the 2024 MOU. In addition, a proposed 2,000 MW Labrador wind project could provide the province with a further 400 MW of electricity, bringing the total increase to approximately 760 MW more power than contemplated under the earlier agreement. Newfoundland and Labrador retained the flexibility to use this electricity for domestic industrial development or sell surplus power externally. Hydro-Québec agreed to purchase unused provincial allocations at premium pricing, reported as 150 percent above base PPA pricing.

Another major breakthrough involved transmission rights. Unlike the 2024 MOU, the revised agreement guarantees Newfoundland and Labrador access to use Quebec's transmission network to reach external markets. The province secured a transmission portfolio totaling 985 MW, including up to 240 MW through the Champlain Hudson Power Express (CHPE) into New York and 200 MW through the New England Clean Energy Connect (NECEC) into New England. Additional capacity includes synthetic export arrangements and direct transmission opportunities. For the first time, Newfoundland and Labrador gained the independent ability to export significant volumes of electricity through Quebec to U.S. markets without requiring Hydro-Québec approval for those sales decisions.

The development plan itself underwent important changes. The previously contemplated Churchill Falls Expansion (CFX) project was removed from the commercial agreement. While a feasibility study will continue to examine future expansion possibilities, no binding commercial arrangements were established for that component. Instead, attention shifted toward upgrading the existing Churchill Falls facility, increasing its generating capacity by approximately 1,275 MW, and expanding the proposed Gull Island project to roughly 2,700 MW, substantially larger than originally envisioned in the 2024 MOU.

Federal participation became a defining element of the agreement. The federal government committed approximately $10 billion in financing support for Churchill Falls upgrades, Gull Island development, transmission infrastructure, and the Labrador wind project. Newfoundland and Labrador's share of direct federal support was estimated at approximately $3.5 billion in 2026 net present value, including investments in Labrador West transmission infrastructure, wind-energy development support, loan guarantees, and additional financing measures intended to reduce project costs and risk.

The agreement also aimed to support Labrador's mining sector. The federal government announced that projects associated with the Labrador Trough, described as a world-class iron ore and critical minerals region, would receive support through federal development initiatives and the Major Projects Office. Proposed investments include a transmission line to mining developments in Labrador West, planning and feasibility work for the Kami Iron Ore Project, pre-construction work related to the Lac Knife project, and expansion of critical-minerals handling infrastructure at SFP Pointe-Noire. The objective is to leverage expanded electricity infrastructure to stimulate mining and industrial growth throughout the region.

Employment and Indigenous participation were central elements of the agreement. The agreement guarantees that 85 percent of all person-hours associated with Gull Island construction will remain within Newfoundland and Labrador, with priority given first to qualified Labrador Innu workers, followed by Labrador residents and Newfoundlanders. Governments estimated that as many as 5,000 workers could be employed at Gull Island during peak construction, while the broader package of developments could support more than 20,000 jobs overall. Newfoundland and Labrador and Canada also identified opportunities for Labrador Innu participation in future transmission and wind-energy assets.

For residents of Newfoundland and Labrador, the provincial government linked the agreement to direct consumer benefits. Once finalized, a 15 percent "Churchill River Electricity Rebate" is expected to apply to the first 2,000 kWh of electricity consumed each month. The government estimates that this measure would save the average household approximately $351 per year.

Despite the announcement, the agreement remains non-binding, with definitive agreements expected before the end of 2026. The current arrangement allows parties to withdraw before final execution. Opposition Liberals questioned several aspects of the revised deal, including the relative allocation of additional power between Newfoundland and Labrador and Quebec and the absence of withdrawal penalties. Premier Wakeham also abandoned his earlier commitment to hold a referendum, announcing instead that a special session of the House of Assembly would begin on September 14, 2026 to allow elected representatives to review and debate the agreement publicly.

On September 17, 2026, the House of Assembly voted 21-18 to approve the Definitive Cooperation and Implementation Agreement (DCIA) with the PC caucus and Independent MHA Eddie Joyce voting in favour and the Liberal and NDP caucuses voting against, along with Independent MHA Keith Russell.

== See also ==
- List of largest power stations in Canada
- Muskrat Falls Generating Station
