= Reference Re Upper Churchill Water Rights Reversion Act (Nfld) =

- Supreme Court of Canada

Hearing: September 28 - October 1, 1982 Judgment: May 3, 1984
- Citations: [1984] 1 S.C.R. 297
- Prior history: Newfoundland Court of Appeal
- Ruling: Appeal allowed

Holding
- Where the pith and substance of provincial legislation is intra-provincial, it may have incidental extra-territorial effects.

Court membership
- Chief Justice: Bora Laskin; Puisne Justices: Roland Ritchie, Brian Dickson, Jean Beetz, Willard Estey, William McIntyre, Julien Chouinard, Antonio Lamer, Bertha Wilson

Reasons given
- Unanimous reasons by: McIntyre J.

Reference Re Upper Churchill Water Rights Reversion Act (Nfld) [1984] 1 S.C.R. 297 is a famous constitutional reference question put to the Supreme Court of Canada. The Court found that legislation passed by the government of Newfoundland to take back water rights contracted out to the province of Quebec was unconstitutional. The decision had a huge impact on both provinces, as the Churchill Falls generating station is one of the largest producers of hydro-electric power in Canada and the agreement guarantees Quebec will receive a majority of the revenue from the Falls until 2034.

== Background ==
By an Act of the Province of Newfoundland, the Churchill Falls (Labrador) Corporation (CFLCo) developed hydro-electric generators at the Churchill Falls, in Labrador. In 1969, the company, controlled by the British Newfoundland Development Corporation (BRINCO) entered an agreement with Hydro-Québec, a public utility owned by the government of Quebec, to sell a large majority of the power generated by the Falls at a low fixed rate for the next 65 years.

After buying out BRINCO's shares in 1974, the government of Newfoundland began to explore ways to get a greater portion of the power generated from the Falls. In 1980, the legislature passed the Upper Churchill Water Rights Reversion Act, which reverted ownership of the Falls to the provincial government, repealed the Act that granted the land to the CF(L)Co, expropriated the company's assets, including Hydro-Québec's participation in the joint venture.

The province submitted a reference to the Newfoundland Court of Appeal, which found it intra vires.

== Supreme Court of Canada judgment ==
The Supreme Court of Canada stated that the Act was ultra vires the province and so struck it down. In performing pith and substance analysis on the legislation by looking at the Act's purpose and effect, the Court found that the Act was colourable. That is, the form of the Act appears to address a valid matter but in substance actually addresses a matter outside its authority. The "Pith and Substance" of the Act, its dominant feature or purpose, was to interfere with the right of Hydro-Québec granted by the agreement with Churchill Falls Corp to receive power from across the provincial border.

== See also ==
- Churchill Falls generating station
- Newfoundland and Labrador Hydro
- Hydro-Québec
- Churchill Falls (Labrador) Corporation Limited
