= Menihek Hydroelectric Generating Station =

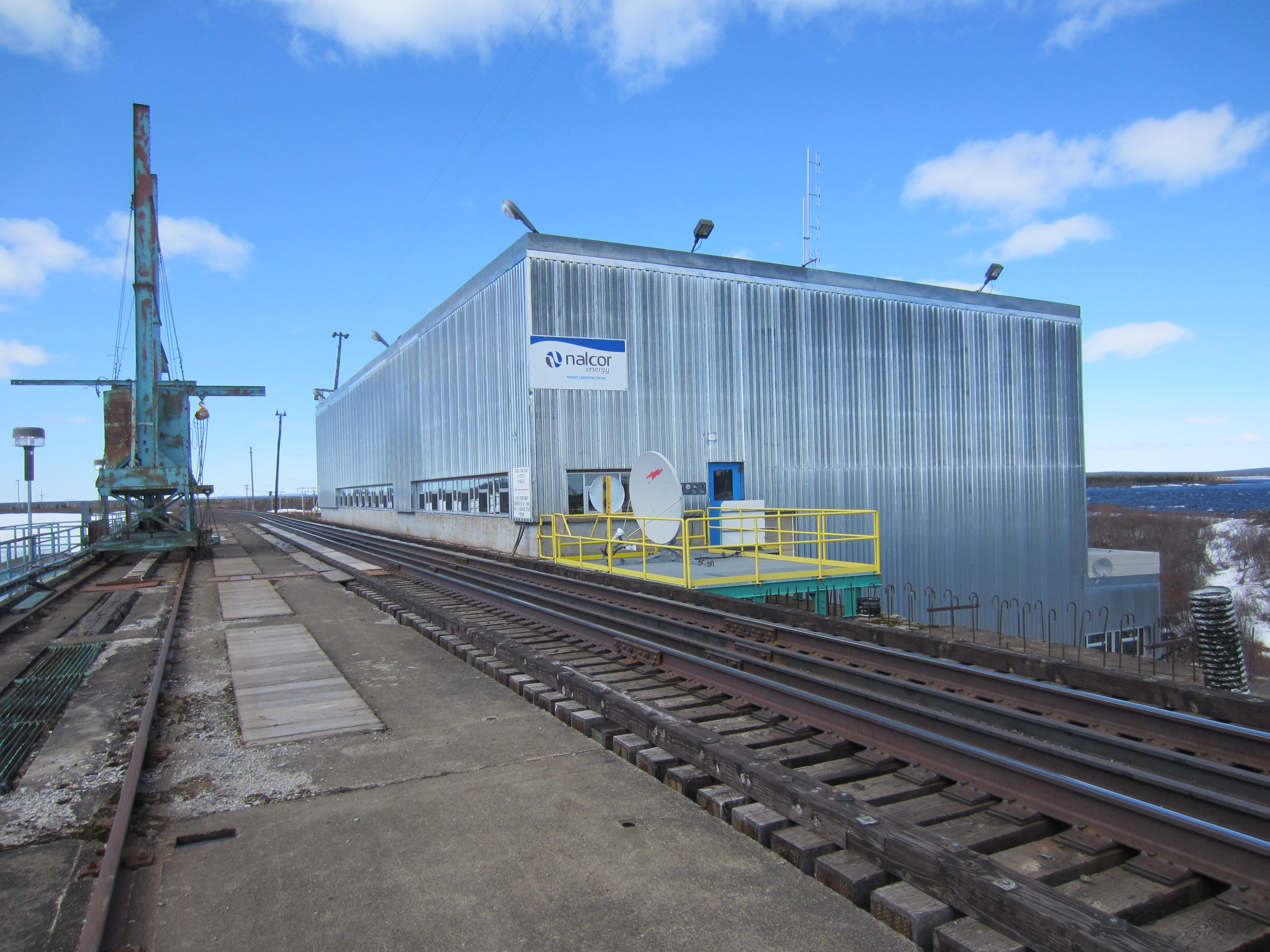

- Location within Newfoundland and Labrador
- Country: Canada
- Location: Newfoundland and Labrador
- Coordinates: 54°28′16″N 66°36′45″W
- Status: Operational
- Construction began: 1951
- Opening date: 1954
- Owner: Newfoundland and Labrador Hydro

Dam and spillways
- Type of dam: Barrage dam
- Impounds: Ashuanipi River
- Length: 228.6 m (750 ft)
- Elevation at crest: 451.10 m (1,480 ft)
- Width (crest): 6 m (20 ft)
- Spillway capacity: 4,247 m^{3}/s (150,000 cu ft/s)

Reservoir
- Creates: Lake Menihek
- Active capacity: 423.8 hm^{3} (1.5×10^{10} ft^{3})
- Catchment area: 19,166 km^{2} (7,400 mi^{2})
- Normal elevation: 449.59 m (1,475 ft)

Menihek Hydroelectric Generating Station
- Hydraulic head: 10.4 m (34 ft) (units 1-2); 12 m (40 ft) (unit 3)
- Turbines: 2 × 4,400 kW (1954); 1 × 9,900 kW (1960)
- Installed capacity: 17.2 MW; 18.7 MW (max. planned)
- Capacity factor: 26%
- Annual generation: 47 GWh
- Sources: RSW Inc. 2001, pp. 24–25; Cloutier et al. 2002, p. 30

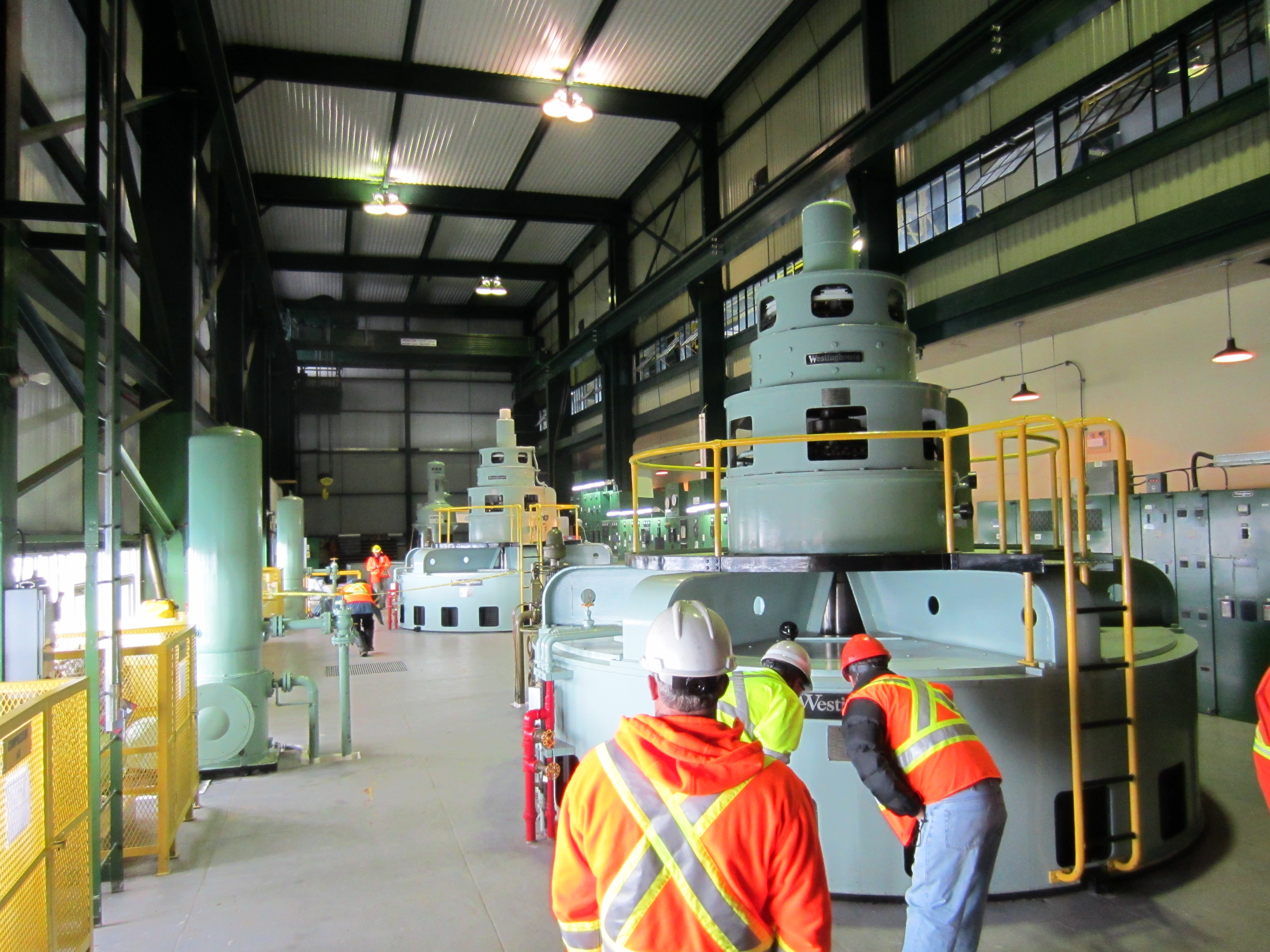
Inside the powerhouse

The Menihek Hydroelectric Generating Station is a conventional hydroelectric generating station at Menihek Lake in Labrador. The dam and powerhouse are located in the Canadian province of Newfoundland and Labrador, 40 km (25 mi) south of the isolated town of Schefferville, Quebec and two First Nations communities: Matimekosh-Lac-John and Kawawachikamach. The generating station, two 69 kV power lines and the distribution networks in each community form an independent electricity network, off the main North American grid.

== Geography ==
The power development is located approximately 170 km (110 mi) north of Labrador City, Labrador, in an uninhabitated region in the northwestern tip of Labrador. The station is just south of the Laurentian Divide between the Atlantic and Arctic drainage basins which delineates the Quebec–Newfoundland and Labrador border in the area. The climate in Schefferville, 40 km (25 mi) north of Menihek, is characterized by an average temperature of −5.3 °C (22.5 °F) — which can drop as low as −51 °C (−60 °F) in the winter and rise to 34 °C (93 °F) in the summer. The average frost-free period lasts from mid-June to mid-September. The area receives on average 833 mm (32.8 in) of precipitation, roughly divided between rain and snow.

The terrain in this remote area is rugged and the dam is only accessible by a narrow Gravel road from Schefferville or Tshiuetin Rail Transportation railway.

== History ==
The facilities, including Menihek Aerodrome, were built between 1951 and 1954 by the Iron Ore Company of Canada to meet the power requirements of its iron ore mining operations at the Knob Lake site, near the company town of Schefferville. After IOC closed the mine in 1982, it kept the generating station running for two decades. However, in the early 2000s, the mining company gave notice to the Government of Quebec that it would cease to operate the plant and electric network as of November 1, 2002. In a last-minute deal, Hydro-Québec agreed to pay for all charges incurred by IOC to run the money-losing network while the governments of Quebec and Newfoundland and Labrador and First Nations communities tried to reach a deal on a mutually acceptable way to split the assets.

An agreement was reached by the two provinces and their respective utilities on December 14, 2005. IOC would sell all interests in the generating station and part of the transmission lines to provincially owned Newfoundland and Labrador Hydro (NLH), as is, for $1, while transferring its Quebec utility operations to Hydro-Québec for the same amount. Under the deal, the generating station would be operated by NLH employees, but it would be managed by a 4-person operating committee staffed by personnel of both utilities.

Under the 40-year contract, Hydro-Québec is responsible for any operation, maintenance and refurbishment costs of the network's facilities owned by NLH and agrees to buy a firm volume of 40 GWh/year at 3¢/kWh with the remainder at 2¢. Rates are adjusted to the consumer price index for the duration and NLH has the right to recall power and break the contract with a 6-year notice. The agreement was finalized on November 15, 2007.

== Dam and powerhouse ==
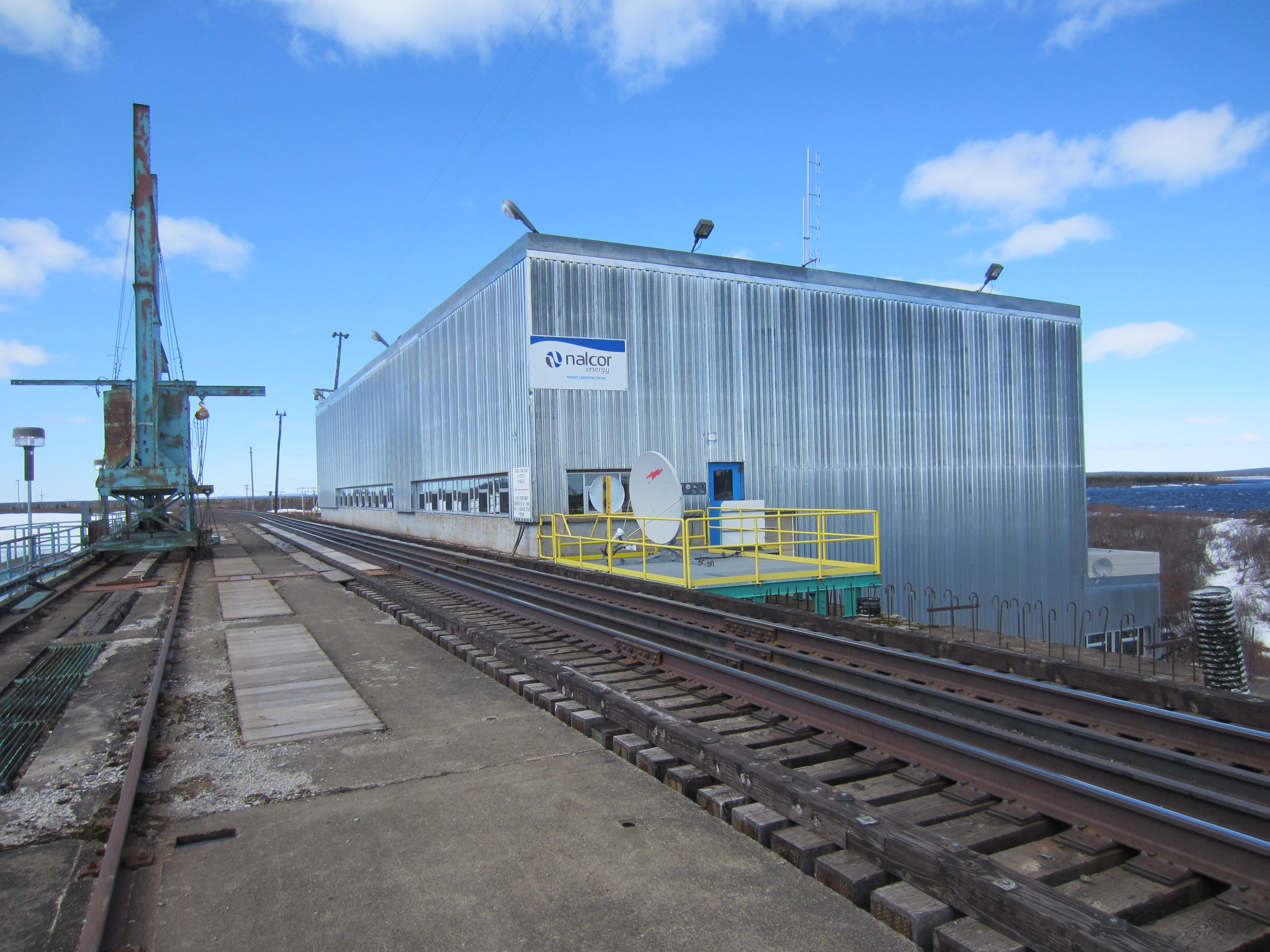
Outside view of the powerhouse

The power development at the Menihek site includes a 228.6 m (750 ft) concrete gravity dam, a water intake, powerhouse and a 4-gate spillway, with a capacity of 4,247 m^{3}/s (150,000 cu ft/s).

The impoundment of Menihek Lake, which serves as a reservoir, is completed by three rock-fill dikes made of glacial till, for a total length of 6.2 km (4 mi). The Tshiuetin Rail Transportation shortline railway (formerly the Menihek Subdivision of the Quebec North Shore and Labrador Railway) connecting Schefferville and Sept-Îles uses the dikes to cross the area.

The powerhouse was designed to receive four generating units but only two were installed when the plant came on stream in 1954. Units 1 and 2 are equipped with Francis turbines and each have a capacity of 4,400 kW at a nominal hydraulic head of 10.4 m (34 ft). Each turbine is coupled to a 5,000 kVA alternator. In 1960, IOC added unit 3, a 9,900-kW Kaplan turbine under a 12 m (39 ft) head and its 12,000 kVA alternator.

== Aerodrome ==
Menihek Aerodrome
- IATA: none; ICAO: none

Summary
- Airport type: Private
- Operator: Newfoundland and Labrador Hydro
- Serves: Menihek Hydroelectric Generating Station
- Location: Menihek Lake, Labrador
- Time zone: AST (UTC−04:00)
  - Summer (DST): ADT (UTC−03:00)
- Elevation AMSL: 1,423 ft / 434 m

Map
- Location in Newfoundland and Labrador

Runways
Direction	Length		Surface
Direction	ft	m	Surface
15/33	4,000	1,220	Gravel
- Sources: Canada Flight Supplement

Menihek Aerodrome is an abandoned airport located on the east coast of Menihek Lake, Labrador, Canada.

=== History ===
The airport was built between 1951 and 1952 by the Iron Ore Company of Canada to service the Menihek Hydroelectric Generating Station built to meet the power requirements of its iron ore mining operations at the Knob Lake site, near the company town of Schefferville.

=== Accidents and incidents ===
On 28 July 1953 an Avro 683 Lancaster (registration CF-GBA) of World-Wide Airways crashed upon landing while on a cargo flight from Sept-Îles Airport. The airplane was carrying a cargo of 8100 litres of diesel, 1135 litres of gasoline, and 3000 litres of avgas. The approach was performed in strong crosswinds and after landing the airplane veered out of control and collided with rocks at the end of the runway. Both pilots evacuated without injury while the aircraft caught on fire and was destroyed.

== See also ==
- List of electrical generating stations in Newfoundland and Labrador
- Churchill Falls Generating Station
- Labrador boundary dispute
- History of Hydro-Québec

== Works cited ==
- Cloutier, J.; Gagnon, J.; Labrèche, M.; Nguyen, P.; Ouellet, R.; Pleau, Y. (October 2002). Audit de la centrale Menihek (PDF) (in French). Montreal: Hydro-Québec Production. Archived from the original (PDF) on February 14, 2019.
- Envir-Eau (March 2009). Hydrogeological report DSO2 and DSO3 sectors. Schefferville (Quebec) and Elross Lake (Newfoundland and Labrador) (PDF). Gatineau, Quebec: Newfoundland and Labrador Department of Environment and Conservation.
- Hydro-Québec Distribution (May 31, 2006). Projet de prise en charge de l'alimentation électrique de la région de Schefferville, phase I (PDF). Montreal: Régie de l'énergie du Québec. Docket R-3602-2006.
- Newfoundland and Labrador Hydro (2008). 2008 Business and Financial Report (PDF). St. John's: Government of Newfoundland and Labrador.
- RSW Inc. (November 2001). Étude sur la centrale de Menihek et ses réseaux de transport et de distribution. Rapport préliminaire, volet 1 (PDF) (in French). Montreal: RSW Inc. Archived from the original (PDF) on October 7, 2011.
