= Crooks' Hollow Dam =

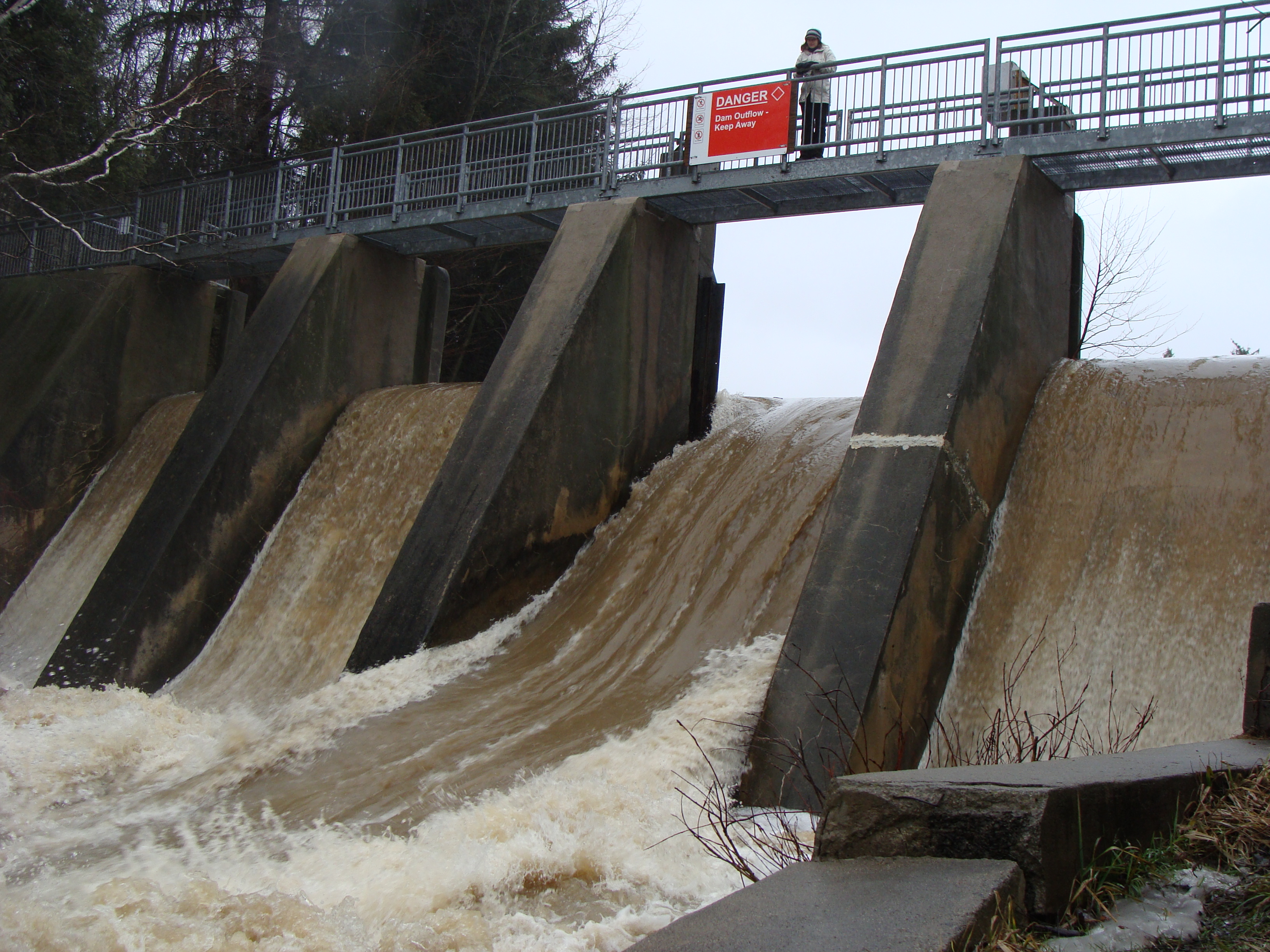
- Crooks Hollow Dam with all 4 spillways in action on March 14, 2010. On this day, HCA's upstream measuring station at Christie Conservation Area recorded 67.5 mm of rain.

- Location within Ontario
- Country: Canada
- Location: Greensville, Ontario
- Coordinates: 43°16′43″N 79°59′47″W
- Status: Demolished
- Opening date: 1916
- Demolition date: 2013

Dam and spillways
- Height: 17.5 feet (5 m)
- Length: 100 feet (30 m)
- Website http://www.conservationhamilton.ca/crooks-hollow

Crooks' Hollow Dam (alternatively, Dundas Town Dam) was a buttressed gravity dam, built of concrete in 1916 on Spencer Creek in Greensville, Ontario, Canada.

About 100 yards upstream from the ruins of the much earlier Cockburn sawmill and dam, Crooks' Hollow replaced that dam in supplying water by pipe to Dundas for all uses. It also provided much greater flood control, and, more than the Cockburn dam, supplied a managed flow for water power users in the industries downstream. The Dundas Star commented on its completion: "... an excellent piece of work. It is now hoped there will be no further difficulty about securing an adequate water supply for many years to come." The dam was demolished in early 2013.

== Design and construction ==
The dam was built in such a way that pure, cool water was drawn from the bottom of the reservoir for the existing pipe to Dundas; and for impure, warmed water to be sent over the spillways for industrial use downstream. The dam was created with reservoir expansion in mind, from 10,000,000 to 15,000,000 gallons, by the simple addition of another 3 feet of stoplogs.

Local professionals built the dam. The consulting engineer was E.H. Darling (of McPhee, Kelly and Darling, Bank of Hamilton Building, Hamilton, Ont.). The general contractor was McAllister and Taylor (#37, Sun Life Building, Hamilton). They completed the project without overrunning its budget of $6,300. Expropriation of the south-bank Hunt and west-end Morden properties was extra.

== Features ==
Features of the dam included:

- 100 feet long and 17½ feet high with 3 more feet of height possible
- "a massive monolithic concrete construction"
- incorporated "0.8 m thick base/key under the dam which provides sliding resistance on the d/s [downstream] key face and increases the weight of the dam"
- 1-foot-thick stoplogs could be inserted to raise the level of any or all of 4 spillways in many configurations
- a fifth route to ease overtopping water levels, along the left wing wall, which is no higher than the original design operating level
- much earlier Morden dam pond, with its berm and ruins, usually has the same water level as the reservoir and, therefore, is continuous with it
- on top of the spillway columns, a bridge connecting "downtown" Greensville to a path to Kirby Avenue and a branch of Hamilton Public Library (bridge replaced about 1995) provides greater vistas upstream and downstream
- large reservoir to supply Dundas and "power users below [dam]" throughout dry summers
- flood prevention (floods had plagued Dundas over the previous century)
- reservoir formed "a splendid natural settling basin", saving on filtration
- Dundas was to save the cost of the dam in pumping alone every year
- "To protect the water as much as possible", a wire fence was built on the south side of the reservoir and a tight board fence on the north. The wire fence is still in evidence.

== Crooks' Hollow ==
The dam's impoundment, or reservoir, had been the subject of much photographic interest for its tranquil, picturesque beauty, especially in the autumn. Recreational activities at the dam that have occupied at least three Greensville generations include fishing, birding, walking the trails, picnicking, boating and swimming (historically).

The entire Crooks' Hollow, which was named after James Crooks and was Upper Canada's first industrial park in the 19th century, is noteworthy for offering nature in an unmanaged state (only dangerous dead trees are cut down), with a wide variety of avian, animal, amphibian and piscine life. The Hollow is also noteworthy for its freedom from noise (excepting the steady roar of the spillways), from commercialization and from litter. Ruins of past water-power industries are plentiful, and have sometimes been used for educational purposes. The dam itself has that potential.

In 1969 the Hamilton Region Conservation Authority established Crooks' Hollow as its first Conservation Area, with "extensive restoration" of the dam. In September 2008 its successor, the Hamilton Conservation Authority slated the dam for demolition. The Authority's environmental assessment has been upheld by the Ontario Ministry of the Environment. In December 2010, the Authority stated the dam's demolition and the creek's rehabilitation would begin in 2011 and end in 2012. This is motivated by environmental concerns along with fears that the dam could fail during or after a major storm. Hundreds of residents and Facebook supporters wish to preserve the dam and its reservoir for recreational, aesthetic and heritage purposes.

In late 2012, the conservation area trails were closed for the demolition of the dam. Work was completed and the area reopened in 2013, which included the re-branding of a string of connected trails running through the property as the Spencer Adventure Trail, as well as a new walking bridge across the previous location of the dam.

== See also ==
- List of reservoirs and dams in Canada
- Small hydro
