= Nalcor Energy =

Defunct provincial energy corporation

- Type: Crown Corporation
- Industry: Energy
- Founded: 2007 in St. John's, NL
- Defunct: 2021
- Fate: Folded into Newfoundland and Labrador Hydro
- Headquarters: St. John's, NL, Canada
- Key people: Stan Marshall (President & CEO) Brendan Paddick (Chair of the Board)
- Revenue: ▲Can$1 Billion (2019)
- Operating income: ▲Can$132 Million (2018)
- Total assets: ▲Can$19.3 Billion (2018)
- Owner: Government of Newfoundland and Labrador
- Website: www.nalcorenergy.com

Nalcor Energy was an energy corporation headquartered in St. John's, Newfoundland and Labrador. A provincial Crown corporation under the Government of Newfoundland and Labrador, Nalcor Energy was created in 2007 to manage the province's energy resources.

The company had distinct business lines comprising Newfoundland and Labrador Hydro, the Churchill Falls (Labrador) Corporation, the Lower Churchill Project, energy marketing, oil and gas development, and The Bull Arm Fabrication Site.

On June 23, 2021, Premier Andrew Furey announced Nalcor Energy would be dismantled and folded into NL Hydro, previously a subsidiary of Nalcor.

== Operations ==
=== Hydro ===
Newfoundland and Labrador Hydro, commonly shortened to "Hydro", was originally a subsidiary of Nalcor, generating and delivering electricity for Newfoundland and Labrador, as well as parts of Quebec and the north-eastern United States. It also delivers voice and data telecommunications services to customers in some areas.

Hydro itself is the parent company of the Hydro Group of Companies, which comprises:

- Churchill Falls Labrador Corporation Limited (CFLCo)
- Lower Churchill Development Corporation Limited (LCDC)
- Gull Island Power Company Limited (GIPCo)
- Twin Falls Power Corporation Limited (TwinCo)

=== Churchill Falls Generating Station ===
Churchill Falls Generating Station is one of the largest underground powerhouses in the world. The plant has 11 turbines with a rated capacity of 5,428 megawatts. Nalcor controlled a 65.8% share of the Churchill Falls Labrador Corporation Limited, the owner of the Churchill Falls station while Quebec's government-owned utility, Hydro-Québec, owns the remaining shares.

=== Lower Churchill Project ===
The Lower Churchill Project is a planned project to develop the remaining 35% of the Churchill River, that has not already been developed by the Upper Churchill Falls Generating Station. The Lower Churchill's two installations at Gull Island and Muskrat Falls will have a combined capacity of over 3,000 MW.

=== Oil and Gas ===
Nalcor Energy's Oil and Gas division held and managed oil and gas interests in the Newfoundland and Labrador onshore and offshore oil developments. The company is currently a partner in three offshore developments - the Hebron oil field, the White Rose Growth Project and the Hibernia Southern Extension. A $20 million onshore drilling exploration program in Parsons Pond in western Newfoundland is also being operated by Nalcor - Oil and Gas.

=== Bull Arm Fabrication ===
The Bull Arm Fabrication site was developed in the early 1990s and is Atlantic Canada's largest industrial fabrication site. The site is located 150 kilometres west of St. John's, Newfoundland and Labrador. The Hibernia oil field's gravity base structure was constructed at the site, as well work on the two Floating Production Storage and Offloading (FPSO) vessel's for the Terra Nova oil field and the White Rose oil field were done here.
