= Newfoundland Power =

Electric utility owned by Fortis Inc.

Newfoundland Power Inc.
- Formerly: Newfoundland Light & Power
- Company type: Subsidiary
- Industry: Electricity generation & distribution
- Founded: 1924; 102 years ago
- Headquarters: St. John's, Newfoundland and Labrador, Canada
- Key people: Gary Murray (President & CEO)
- Products: Electricity
- Revenue: ▲$420,000,000 CAN
- Number of employees: 650 (2017)
- Parent: Fortis Inc.
- Website: newfoundlandpower.com

Newfoundland Power Inc. is a Canadian electric utility, the primary retailer of electric power in the province of Newfoundland and Labrador. The company was formed by the Royal Securities Corporation of Montreal in 1924 as the Newfoundland Light & Power Company. It is owned by Fortis Inc.

In the year of its incorporation it purchased the assets of the St. John's Light and Power Company which had been formed originally by Robert Gillespie Reid as the St. John's Street Railway Company in 1896. Those assets included Newfoundland and Labrador's first hydro electric generating station at Petty Harbour, Petty Harbour Hydro Electric Generating Station.

After 1924 Newfoundland Light & Power Company became a subsidiary of the International Power Company, and it remained a subsidiary until 1949, when the parent company sold its shares in it to the general public.

The Newfoundland Light & Power Company supplied the general needs of the St. John's urban area and operated the city's electrical street car system. In 1948 the street railway was disbanded and the company became solely an electric company.

Newfoundland Power operates 23 hydro generating plants, three diesel plants and three gas turbine facilities for a total installed capacity of 139.4 MW.

== Historical highlights ==
- 1926 the company increased the generating capacity of the Petty Harbour Generating Station
- 1931 completed a 3 MW hydro electric generating station at Pierre's Brook
- 1931 laid two 13 kW cables across the Bell Island tickle in Conception Bay to supply the iron ore mines on Bell Island
- 1951 purchased from Bowater's Newfoundland Pulp and Paper Mills and Bay of Islands Light and Power Company the distribution systems in Corner Brook and Deer Lake.
- 1956 obtained from the Anglo Newfoundland Development Company the distribution system in Grand Falls, Windsor, Bishops Falls and Botwood.
- 1958 completed a 12.5 MW hydro electric generating station at Rattling Brook.
- 1958 obtained from the Department of Transport the distribution system in Gander.
- 1962 converted the Grand Falls, Windsor, Bishop's Falls and Botwood distribution systems from 50 cycles (50 Hz voltage signal) to the North American standard of 60 cycles.
- 1966 Union Electric Light and Power Company became part of the Newfoundland Light and Power Company.
- 1966 the company had eleven generating plants with an installed capacity of 95 MW.
- 1970 the company sold over the one billion kW·h (1 TW·h).
- 1981 the company had twenty-one hydro stations, three gas turbines, seven diesel generating plants and one thermal power station for a total installed capacity of 241 MW.
- 1987 shareholders of Newfoundland Light & Power Co. form Fortis Inc. as a holding company with 100% ownership of the regulated electrical utility.
- 1990 Newfoundland Light & Power Co. changes its corporate name to Newfoundland Power.
- 1998 the company changed its legal name from Newfoundland Light & Power Co. to Newfoundland Power Inc.

== Hydroelectric Facilities ==
See also: List of generating stations in Newfoundland and Labrador.

Name	Location	Capacity (MW)	In Service	Ref
Cape Broyle	47°05′45.3″N 52°56′13.9″W	6.28	1952	
Fall Pond (Little St. Lawrence)	46°55′42.6″N 55°21′26.2″W	0.35	1942	
Grand Falls	48°55′31.5″N 55°40′04.2″W	74.5	1937	
Heart's Content	47°51′46.1″N 53°22′32.6″W	2.7	1918	
Horsechops	47°07′55.2″N 52°58′53.7″W	8.13	1953	
Lawn	46°56′52.6″N 55°32′10.3″W	0.6	1983	
Lockston	48°24′03.4″N 53°22′43.3″W	3	1955	
Lookout Brook	48°21′58.5″N 58°17′39.3″W	5.8	1958	
Mobile	47°14′52.3″N 52°50′30.5″W	10.5	1951	
New Chelsea	48°01′44.9″N 53°12′36.9″W	3.7	1957	
Petty Harbour	47°27′55.2″N 52°42′44.6″W	5.25	1900	
Pierre's Brook	47°17′18.0″N 52°49′15.6″W	4.3	1931	
Pitman's Pond	48°00′23.3″N 53°11′39.0″W	0.625	1959	
Port Union	48°29′53.2″N 53°05′24.0″W	0.511	1918	
Rattling Brook	49°04′03.1″N 55°17′53.6″W	14.8	1959	
Rocky Pond	47°15′13.2″N 52°56′09.2″W	3.25	1943	
Rose Blanche Brook	47°39′06.6″N 58°42′46.8″W	6	1998	
Sandy Brook	48°53′27.3″N 55°49′22.1″W	6.31	1963	
Seal Cove	47°27′26.6″N 53°04′03.9″W	3.58	1923	
Topsail	47°32′22.2″N 52°55′08.6″W	2.6	1983	
Tors Cove	47°12′38.1″N 52°50′54.3″W	6.5	1942	
Victoria	47°46′30.4″N 53°12′55.7″W	0.55	1904	
West Brook	46°56′33.2″N 55°23′03.9″W	0.68	1942	

== Decommissioned stations ==
Name	Location	Capacity (MW)	Date	Type	Ref
Aguathuna	48°33′43″N 58°46′09″W	1.2	1962–1998	Diesel Genset	
Flavin's Lane	47.568633°N 52.708150°W	0.186	1885–1892	Thermal (Coal)	
Gander	48°56′56″N 54°35′08″W	2.65	1949–1998	Diesel Genset	
Port aux Basques	47°36′34″N 59°10′58″W	3.07	1973–2000	Diesel Genset	
Port Union	48°29′53″N 53°05′25″W	0.5	1949–1998	Diesel Genset	
Salt Pond	47°05′37″N 55°12′10″W	1.5	1963–1998	Diesel Genset	
St. John's Diesel	47.563886°N 52.690469°W	2.5	1953–2005	Diesel Genset	
St. John's Steam	47.563909°N 52.690110°W	9.8	1956–2000	Thermal (Fuel oil)	

== See also ==
- List of generating stations in Newfoundland and Labrador
- Newfoundland and Labrador Power Commission
- Newfoundland and Labrador Hydro
