= Muskrat Falls Generating Station =

Hydroelectric generation station in Labrador, Canada

Muskrat Falls Generation Station
- Muskrat Falls in 2026

- Location of Muskrat Falls in Newfoundland and Labrador
- Location: Labrador, Newfoundland and Labrador, Canada
- Coordinates: 53°14′44″N 60°46′22″W
- Construction began: 2013
- Opening date: September 23, 2020
- Construction cost: $12.7 billion
- Owner: Newfoundland and Labrador Hydro

Dam and spillways
- Type of dam: Roller compacted concrete
- Impounds: Churchill River
- Elevation at crest: 39.5 m
- Spillways: 2
- Spillway type: 1 overflow spillway and 1 spillway with submerged radial gates
- Spillway capacity: 5930 m^{3}/s

Reservoir
- Normal elevation: 39 m

Power Station
- Turbines: 4 x 206 MW Kaplan turbines
- Installed capacity: 824 MW
- Capacity factor: 62.3%
- Annual generation: 4.5 TWh

The Muskrat Falls Generating Station is a hydroelectric generating station on the Churchill River in Newfoundland and Labrador, Canada. It is located downstream of the Churchill Falls Generating Station. The station at Muskrat Falls has a capacity of over 824 MW and provides 4.5 TWh of electricity per year.

A $6.2 billion deal between Newfoundland and Labrador's Nalcor Energy and Halifax, Nova Scotia-based Emera to develop the project was announced in November 2010. On November 30, 2012, a federal loan guarantee deal for financing of the project was signed by Prime Minister Stephen Harper, Newfoundland and Labrador Premier Kathy Dunderdale and Nova Scotia Premier Darrell Dexter. On December 17, 2012, the provincial government announced project sanction. Emera received approval to proceed with the Maritime Link from the Nova Scotia Utility and Review Board in 2013. Financial close for the loan guarantee occurred in late 2013.

On September 23, 2020, the first unit at Muskrat Falls was synced to the electricity grid in Labrador. Power from the remaining three units was originally expected to come online in the fall of 2021. However, there were delays in construction, including on the corresponding Labrador–Island Link which will transmit generated power to a converter outside St. John's. In April 2023, Jennifer Williams, CEO of Newfoundland and Labrador Hydro, announced the completion of the final successful test of the 1100 km transmission link to Newfoundland. Commissioning by the federal government will be announced following the completion of paperwork.

The station was originally approved in 2012 with an anticipated price tag of around $7.4 billion, but the costs increased to more than $13 billion.

== Technical plan ==
=== Generation ===
Reservoir impoundment was completed in 2019 with the flooding of 41 km^{2} of land to create the 101 km^{2} reservoir. Containment is by a two-part concrete dam totalling 757 metres long. This will power an 834 MW generating station.

=== Transmission ===
Power is transmitted to Newfoundland via a 350 kV high-voltage direct current line with a capacity of 900 MW. The total length is 1,100 km, of which 30 km are submarine power cables under the Strait of Belle Isle. Construction began in 2014 and ended in 2018.

Power is transmitted from Stephenville on Newfoundland to Nova Scotia via a 200 kV 180 km sub-sea line to Point Aconi on Cape Breton Island with a capacity of 500 MW. Construction was a 1.2 billion dollar joint venture between Nalcor and Emera. The link came online in December 2017.

Once on Newfoundland and the mainland of the Maritimes, power is distributed via the existing grid. Emera hopes to sell surplus power via a proposed 563 km underwater transmission line from New Brunswick to Massachusetts.

== Environmental impact ==
In late 2006, Nalcor registered the generation components of the Lower Churchill Project, including both Gull Island and Muskrat Falls, for environmental assessment with the provincial and federal governments. The provincial and federal government agreed to a combined review process that would fulfill the requirements of both levels of government, resulting in the formation of a Joint Review Panel. In 2010, the focus shifted to Muskrat Falls only. The environmental assessment for the transmission lines was done separately and was conducted in 2013. Many Indigenous peoples had serious concerns about how the land and wildlife would be changed by the development. Negotiations between the Innu Nation and the provincial government began in 2006, resulting in the New Dawn (Tshash Petapen) Agreement, finalized in 2011. This agreement included an Impacts and Benefits Agreement (IBA), a Redress Agreement related to damage caused by the Churchill Falls development, and an agreement in principle about the Innu Nation's land claim. Upon the ratification of the New Dawn Agreement, the Innu Nation indicated that the project was acceptable to them.

In 2016, researchers from Harvard University suggested that methylmercury levels in fish would rise as a result of the project. After protests led by Indigenous groups in Central Labrador in 2016, an agreement was reached by Labrador's three Indigenous groups (Nunatsiavut Government, Innu Nation and the NunatuKavut Community Council) and the Government of Newfoundland and Labrador outlining the establishment of an independent committee to make recommendations on mitigating potential impacts of methylmercury on human health from the Lower Churchill Project at Muskrat Falls, Labrador. In 2018, the committee recommended – among other things – wetland capping to stem the release of methylmercury.

During the Muskrat Falls inquiry in 2019, it was revealed the provincial government wouldn't be completing wetland capping at the Muskrat Falls reservoir as previously planned. The $30 million designated for the capping was split up and offered to all three Indigenous governments, with the Innu Nation and NunatuKavut accepting. Nalcor had applied for a permit in July 2018 to carry out the approximately 13 hectares of wetland capping – essentially pouring sand and stone over a small area of wetland near the reservoir – but the permit was never approved by the Department of Municipal Affairs and Environment. Premier Dwight Ball later said wetland capping would have only decreased methylmercury levels by two per cent.

== Cost overruns and public inquiry ==
The project is more than $6 billion over budget, and five years late as of 2022. Projected cost overruns exceeding 70% from $7.4 billion to $12.7 billion due to poor planning, lack of engineering experience, and related assumptions that were invalid, misleading or later turned out to be incorrect led Nalcor CEO Stan Marshall to say that the project was a boondoggle.

In 2017, Premier Dwight Ball called a public inquiry into the project, which took place between 2018 and 2020. In the inquiry report, Commissioner Richard LeBlanc concluded the government failed its duty to residents by predetermining that the megaproject would proceed no matter what. In his report, LeBlanc concluded that the business case, which assumed the Muskrat Falls project was the lowest-cost power option, was “questionable.” LeBlanc said that the project's economics were not sufficiently tested and that Nalcor failed to consider all potentially viable power options. LeBlanc said that Nalcor concealed information that could have undermined the business case for the project from the public and government.

In July 2021, Prime Minister Justin Trudeau announced that the Government of Canada would provide the project with $5.2 billion of financial support to compensate for its large cost overrun (from $6.2 billion to over $13 billion) and to enable the province to maintain the price of power at a competitive rate (14.7 cents per kilowatt-hour). The government of Quebec and Bloc Québécois Members of Parliament protested against this subsidy, which they claimed provided unfair competition to their own Hydro Québec power company. The Innu Nation protested the decision stating they had not been consulted. The Innu Nation also raised concerns about the compensation claimed by the Innu and how cost overruns may reduce the amount of Innu royalties received under the 2011 impact and benefits agreement.

In September 2024, the federal government provided a $500 million bailout for Nova Scotia Power to avoid a nearly 20% rate raises over the next few years due to issues with reliable transmission from the project. In the five years since it went online, Muskrat Falls has had issues with low production and software issues affecting the transmission to Newfoundland, forcing Nova Scotia Power to buy electricity from more expensive sources even though the undersea connection to Nova Scotia had without delays or cost overruns.

== See also ==
- Churchill Falls Generating Station
- List of HVDC projects
