= Churchill Falls (Labrador) Corporation Limited =

Canadian electric company

Churchill Falls (Labrador) Corporation
- Company type: Crown corporation - Subsidiary - Newfoundland and Labrador Hydro (65.8%); Hydro-Québec (34.2%)
- Industry: Electricity generation & distribution
- Founded: St. John's, Newfoundland (1958)
- Headquarters: St. John's, Newfoundland, Canada
- Key people: Jennifer Williams, President & CEO
- Products: Electricity
- Subsidiaries: Twin Falls Power Corporation Ltd
- Website: www.cflco.nf.ca

Churchill Falls (Labrador) Corporation Limited, also known as CF(L)Co or CFLco is a Canadian electric company. The company was founded in 1961 and is based in St. John's, Newfoundland and Labrador. Churchill Falls (Labrador) Corporation Limited operates as a subsidiary of Newfoundland and Labrador Hydro.

== History ==
CF(L)Co was originally formed in 1958 as a subsidiary of British Newfoundland Development Corporation (BRINCO) and known as the Hamilton Falls Power Corporation, it built and operated the Churchill Falls hydroelectric complex.

In 1961, the Government of Newfoundland and Labrador granted the Hamilton Falls Power Corporation a 99-year lease to the 67,340 square kilometres watershed of the Upper Churchill. The Hamilton Falls Power Corporation became known as the Churchill Falls Corporation in 1965 when the name of the falls was changed to commemorate former British Prime Minister Winston Churchill.

CF(L)Co began construction on Churchill Falls Generating Station in 1966 and on May 12, 1969, signed a power contract with Hydro-Québec. The agreement committed Hydro-Québec to buy most of the plant's output at one-quarter of a cent per kilowatt-hour—the exact rate is 0.25425¢ per kilowatt-hour until 2016 and 0.20¢ for the last 25 years of the contract—to build and maintain power lines to carry the power to market and to enter into a risk-sharing agreement whereas the Quebec Crown corporation would cover part of the interest risk and buy some of BRINCO's debt, in exchange for an increased share in CF(L)Co.

The 5,428-megawatt generating station delivered its first kilowatt hours on December 6, 1971 and its 11 turbines were fully operational by June 1974. In 1974 the Government of Newfoundland and Labrador purchased a controlling interest in CF(L)Co from BRINCO and turned it over to the Newfoundland and Labrador Power Commission. The Commission had a 65.8% share in the corporation and the remaining 34.2% was owned by Hydro-Québec.

=== Legal battle ===
In 1967, the year CF(L)Co qualified for Crown Corporation status, the Newfoundland Government initiated proceedings in the Newfoundland Supreme Court to recall 800 megawatts (MW) of the Churchill Falls power from CF(L)Co based upon the lease granted to the corporation in 1961. By 1980, the case had not been resolved, and in that year the Newfoundland Legislature passed the Re Upper Churchill Water Rights Reversion Act to reclaim the water rights granted to the corporation.

Both legislations and the contract itself were subject to protracted legal battles between the two neighbouring provinces, ending up before the Supreme Court of Canada. The court declared the Upper Churchill Water Rights Reversion Act ultra vires in 1984, and twice affirmed the validity of the 1969 contract in 1988.

== See also ==
- Churchill Falls
- Hydro-Québec
- Nalcor
- Lower Churchill Project
