= Ashuanipi Lake =

Lake in Labrador, Canada

- Location in Labrador
- Location: Southern Labrador, Newfoundland and Labrador, Canada
- Coordinates: 52.65°N 66.13°W
- Primary outflows: Ashuanipi River
- Basin countries: Canada
- Surface area: 517 km^{2} (200 sq mi)
- Surface elevation: 529 m (1,736 ft)

Ashuanipi Lake (/ˌæʃuˈɑːnəpi/) is an irregularly shaped lake in southern Labrador, in the Canadian province of Newfoundland and Labrador. It lies at an elevation of 529 m (1,736 ft) and covers an area of 517 km^{2} (200 sq mi), not including 79 km^{2} (31 sq mi) occupied by islands within the lake such as Grande Île or Grosse Île. In the Innu language, ashuanipi means "a place to cross." Ashuanipi River flows from the north end of the lake to the Menihek Lakes, which ultimately drain through the Churchill River system into Lake Melville and the Atlantic Ocean. The Quebec North Shore and Labrador Railway runs along the lake's eastern shore, and the Trans-Labrador Highway crosses the Ashuanipi River about 10 km (6.2 mi) north of the lake's northern terminus.

The lake features excellent fishing for lake trout, pike, whitefish and landlocked salmon. The Lac Joseph caribou herd can be found around Ashuanipi Lake during the summer and fall. The lake is mainly surrounded by forests of black spruce, although the Kapitagas Channel at the southern end of the lake features the only jack pine forest in Labrador and is protected as part of Redfir Lake–Kapitagas Channel Ecological Reserve.

Through radiocarbon dating, evidence has been found at the lake for human habitation as far back as 1600 years ago. Along with the Moisie River, whose headwaters are nearby, the lake was part of a route used by the Innu to reach the lower north shore of the St. Lawrence River. The lake was known to the colonists of New France by the early 18th century.
