= Muskrat Falls =

Waterfall

Coordinates: 53°14′44″N 60°46′17″W

Muskrat Falls was a natural 15-metre (49 ft) waterfall located on the Churchill River about 25 kilometres (16 mi) west of Happy Valley-Goose Bay, Labrador.

The hydropower potential of Muskrat Falls was recognized in the early 1900s when the Grand River Pulp and Lumber Company proposed to build a dam along with a paper mill. Neither was ever constructed. In the early 1970s an engineering and geotechnical survey was carried out to determine the hydro potential of the site. The site was developed as part of the Lower Churchill Project, despite concerns of methylmercury poisoning by researchers and local Inuit.

It is rumored that in 1944 the crew of a German submarine had beached it at the falls when they decided to withdraw from World War II. The rumour inspired a novel by Walter Sellars, Hard Aground published in 1992, but was thought to be unsupported. In 2010, coast guards searching for three men who died after being carried over Muskrat Falls found a 30-metre-long (98 ft) object on the bottom of the Churchill River, believed by diver Brian Corbin to be the missing U-boat. However, examination of historical records shows this to be unlikely, and the sonar images were quite grainy.

== See also ==
- List of waterfalls of Canada
- Lower Churchill Project
