= Twin Falls (Newfoundland and Labrador) =

Former hydroelectric power station in eastern Canada

Twin Falls Hydroelectric Power Station
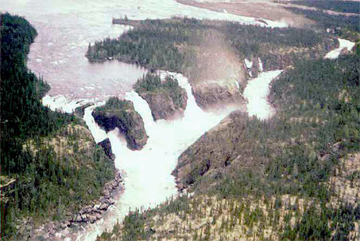
- Twin Falls, Labrador

- Location within Newfoundland and Labrador
- Location: Canada; Newfoundland and Labrador
- Coordinates: 53°29′47.3″N 64°30′59.4″W
- Construction began: 1960
- Opening date: 1963
- Construction cost: $47,500,000
- Owner: Newfoundland and Labrador Hydro

Reservoir
- Creates: Ossokmanuan Reservoir

Power Station
- Commission date: 1963
- Decommission date: 1974 (extended shutdown)
- Turbines: 7
- Installed capacity: 225 MW
- Website; Official website

Twin Falls is the site of a hydroelectric power station developed by the British Newfoundland Development Corporation (Brinco) to deliver power to mining operations in Labrador City and Wabush. Commissioned in 1963, its operation ended in 1974.

The station is located on the Unknown River, a tributary of the Churchill River that drains the central Labrador basin. Construction began in 1960. The river was dammed at Twin Falls to form the Ossokmanuan Reservoir. When finished in 1963, the station has a total capacity of 225 MW with two 115-mile (185 km) long transmission lines at 230,000 volts (or 230 kV). It cost $47.5 million (1963).

Twin Falls power was essential to the later development at Churchill Falls. It helped open up the area and supplied the power required during the construction phase of the project. In the planning stage, however, it became apparent that greater capacity factor in the production of electricity could be achieved by diverting the flow of water from the Ossokmanuan Reservoir into the Smallwood Reservoir. Utilizing this water at the Churchill Falls plant enabled approximately three times as much electricity to be produced from the same volume of water. In July 1974 the Twin Falls plant was put into extended shutdown and the water diverted into the Smallwood Reservoir under an agreement with Churchill Falls Labrador Corporation Limited (CFLCo).

== Aerodrome ==
Twin Falls Aerodrome
- IATA: none; ICAO: none

Summary
- Airport type: Private
- Operator: Newfoundland and Labrador Hydro
- Serves: Twin Falls Hydroelectric Power Station
- Location: Twin Falls, Labrador
- Time zone: AST (UTC−04:00)
  - Summer (DST): ADT (UTC−03:00)
- Elevation AMSL: 1,463 ft (446 m)

Map
- Location in Newfoundland and Labrador

Runways
Direction	Length		Surface
Direction	ft	m	Surface
15/33	1,500	457	Gravel
- Sources: Canada Flight Supplement

Twin Falls Aerodrome is an abandoned airport located .350 NM (0.648 km; 0.403 mi) southeast of the Twin Falls Hydroelectric Power Station, in Labrador, Canada.
