= Bay d'Espoir Hydroelectric Power Station =

- Location within Newfoundland and Labrador
- Location: Canada; Newfoundland and Labrador
- Coordinates: 47°59′24.88″N 55°48′00.51″W
- Construction began: 1964
- Owner: Newfoundland and Labrador Hydro

Dam and spillways
- Impounds: Salmon River

Reservoir
- Creates: Meelpaeg Lake

Power Station
- Hydraulic head: 176 m (577 ft)
- Turbines: 7
- Installed capacity: 613.4 MW
- Capacity factor: 50.2%
- Annual generation: 2,657 GWh
- Website; Official website

The Bay D'Espoir Hydroelectric Development, built by the Newfoundland and Labrador Power Commission is located on the south coast of Newfoundland near the rural community of Bay d'Espoir. It was the second major hydroelectric project undertaken on Newfoundland.

== History ==
The hydroelectric potential of this area was known by the early 1920s but its development was not seriously considered until 1954 when British Newfoundland Development Corporation (BRINCO) became interested in the site. In 1957 a Shawinigan Engineering survey confirmed the feasibility of building a hydroelectric plant. By 1959 BRINCO had set up a subsidiary, Southern Newfoundland Power and Development Corporation, to carry out the project. However, the subsidiary was unable to attract industrial customers to the area; this, it felt, was necessary before undertaking the project, so in 1964 it sold all its rights and assets to the Newfoundland Government.

The government, by taking over the project, became eligible for a $20 million grant from the Atlantic Development Board a Federal Government agency. The engineering and construction work was carried out by ShawMont Newfoundland Engineering, a joint venture company formed by Shawinigan Engineering and Montreal Engineering in 1964.

The Bay D'Espoir Hydroelectric Development was undertaken to provide the province with a large source of low-cost electric power which would allow the island's utilities to extend their services, stimulate the expansion of the industries already in the province and attract new industries to Newfoundland and Labrador. The Electric Reduction Company of Canada Industries Limited (ERCO), phosphorus plant at Long Harbour and the Come by Chance Oil Refinery at Come by Chance were built partially because of the availability of cheap power.

Units 1 through 4 went online between 1967 and 1968, with each unit having a rated capacity of 75 MW.

Generating unit 2 underwent a major refurbishment during the summer of 2010, including a stator rewind, rotor pole re-insulation and protection upgrade. This project was the first stator rewind on a unit of this size in Newfoundland and Labrador Hydro's history.

== Design ==
The headwaters of the Bay d'Espoir system begin at Victoria Lake at an approximate elevation of 320 metres. Through a man-made array of dams and canals, this water is directed to generating plants at Granite Canal, Upper Salmon and, finally, 150 km from Victoria Lake to its final tidewater destination at Bay d'Espoir. Water is collected, stored and diverted from a number of drainage areas between Victoria Lake and Long Pond, the forebay for the two Bay d'Espoir generating stations.

The seven generating units at Bay d'Espoir utilize approximately 176 m of head to produce a rated output of 613.4 MW with a rated flow of 397 m^{3}/s. The plant produces an average of 2,657 GWh annually, making it the largest hydroelectric plant on Newfoundland.
