= Granite Canal Hydroelectric Generating Station =

Coordinates: 48°11′24.30″N 56°48′29.99″W

The Granite Canal Hydroelectric Generating Station is a component of the Newfoundland and Labrador Hydro Corporation's Bay d’Espoir Hydro Electric Development system. The generating station has a rated capacity of 40 MW with an annual average energy production of 224 gigawatt hours (GWh). The generating unit at Granite Canal utilizes approximately 37 metres of head with a rated plant flow of 122.4 cubic metres per second. The unit is equipped with a Kaplan turbine and was first synchronized on May 26, 2003.

A fish habitat compensation system was included in this development to ensure any aquatic habitat loss was avoided, reduced or replaced. A Fish Habitat Compensation Agreement was signed with Fisheries and Oceans Canada to ensure proper construction, utilization and long term viability of the facility.
