= Holyrood Thermal Generating Station =

Fuel oil-fired power station in Holyrood, Newfoundland and Labrador

- Holyrood Generating Station in 2026
- Country: Canada
- Location: Duffs, in Conception Bay, Newfoundland
- Coordinates: 47°27′10.14″N 53°05′43.73″W
- Status: Operational
- Commission date: 1971
- Owner: Newfoundland and Labrador Hydro

Thermal power station
- Primary fuel: Fuel oil
- Secondary fuel: Diesel

Power generation
- Nameplate capacity: 624.5 MW

The Holyrood Thermal Electric Generating Station built by Newfoundland and Labrador Hydro Corporation is located near the community of Holyrood, in Conception Bay, Newfoundland, Canada.

== Overview ==
The initial installation included two 150 megawatt (MW) turbine generators which are propelled by steam heated by two large oil burning furnaces. The Number 6 fuel oil used in the plant to keep the furnaces going is delivered by shuttle tankers to the marine terminal constructed as part of the project.

Newfoundland and Labrador Hydro's Holyrood Thermal Generating Station burns No. 6 heavy fuel oil at the rate of approximately 6,000 barrels (950 m^{3}) per day, per unit at full load to produce steam at 1000 degrees Fahrenheit (540 degrees Celsius) and 13,790 kPa at a rate of over 500 megagrams per hour. In an average year it puts out pollution equivalent to 300,000 cars on the road.

In a thermal generating station, fuel is burned in a boiler to convert water to steam. The high-pressure steam is directed into a turbine that is connected to an electrical generator that produces electricity as it turns. A seawater condenser is used for cooling the spent steam from the turbine, converting it back to water that is reused in the boiler. Holyrood uses over 250,000 litres per minute of sea water for cooling on each unit and 900,000 litres per day of fresh water for make up purpose.

The plant generators operate at 16,000 volts and 7000 amperes transformed up to 230,000 volts for transmission on the island grid to all parts of the system. It generates on average 15 to 25% of Newfoundland’s electricity—up to 30% of the island’s electricity needs at peak in the winter months.

The plant has three smokestacks, one 360 ft (109.8 m) tall and two 300 ft (91.5 m) tall. These are the tallest freestanding structures built on land in Newfoundland.

== History ==
Holyrood was placed in service in 1971 with two 150 MW units. A third 150 MW unit was added in 1980 to increase the output to 450 MW. In 1988/89 the original two units were modified to increase the plant capacity to 490 MW. In January 2014, six–1.825 MW diesel generators were installed for the purpose of providing black start power. In 2017, these diesel generators were connected to Island Interconnected System. In 2015, a 123.5 MW diesel combustion turbine was installed.

== See also ==
- List of power stations in Canada
- List of tallest structures in Canada
