= Hillsborough Resources =

Hillsborough Resources Limited
- Type: Private
- Industry: Nonmetallic Mineral Mining
- Headquarters: Vancouver, British Columbia, Canada
- Key people: David J. Slater; David Turnbull (CEO as of 2016)
- Number of employees: 138
- Parent: Vitol Anker International BV
- Website: www.hillsboroughresources.com

Hillsborough Resources Limited was a privately held coal mining company headquartered in Vancouver, British Columbia, Canada.

Hillsborough operated the Quinsam underground thermal coal mine near Campbell River, British Columbia from 1987, serving the local and west-coast United States cement industry, and the Crossville underground coal mine in Tennessee, United States serving the regional power utility and industrial markets. It also developed the Wapiti Thermal Coal mine near Tumbler Ridge. In addition, Hillsborough owned and operated the Middle Point Barge Loading Facility located on Vancouver Island, Canada.

The company's Crossville mine had discontinued operation by 2007, and the company closed the Quinsam mine in 2016 due to economic pressure, firing 66 people in the process.

It emerged out of bankruptcy protection in 2000 to fend off a takeover bid offering in 2000 $0.18 per share, by Vulcan Capital Management. However, effective December 21, 2009, Vitol Anker International B.V. of the Vitol Group acquired Hillsborough Resources Limited for $0.50 per share, inheriting all its debt.
