= Hinds Lake Hydroelectric Generating Station =

Coordinates: 49°04′58.15″N 57°12′04.31″W

The Hinds Lake Generating Station is a hydroelectric power plant located within the Newfoundland Highland forests ecoregion, in western Newfoundland on the eastern shore of Grand Lake. It makes use of 220 m of head between Hinds Lake on the Buchans plateau and Grand Lake.

The plant operates under an average net head of 214 m. The average rated flow of 20.3 m3/s generates 75 megawatts (MW) electrical power with an average annual production of 352 GWh. The unit, which is equipped with a francis turbine, was first synchronized on December 12, 1980.

The feasibility of a hydro electric development in the area was known of in the early 1960s when Bowater Power Company had completed plans to build a power station on Hinds Brook, which flows from Hinds Lake to Grand Lake. However, the Bowater Power Company decided not to undertake the project when it was learned that the Newfoundland and Labrador Power Commission was building a large generating station at Bay d'Espoir (Bay d’Espoir Hydro Electric Development), and that it would be more economical to buy power from the Commission than to build their own generating plant.
