= Star Lake Hydroelectric Development =

Hydroelectric power station in Newfoundland, Canada

The Star Lake Hydroelectric Generating Station is a hydroelectric generating plant located at Star Lake in central Newfoundland. The plant is owned by Newfoundland and Labrador Hydro, and was first synchronized in 1998. It operates with a single vertical Francis turbine with a 450 ft head and a 173 million cubic metre capacity storage reservoir to generate 18.4 MW of electrical power.
