= Upper Salmon Hydroelectric Development =

Coordinates: 48°11′00.76″N 56°10′24.25″W

The Upper Salmon Hydro Development is a hydroelectric plant in Newfoundland and Labrador. It utilises a portion of the residual head between Meelpaeg Lake Reservoir and Round Pond within the watershed of the Bay d'Espoir Hydroelectric Development.

The plant operates at a normal supply level of 241 m under a net head of 51 metres. The average rated flow of 189.5 m3/s is used to generate 84 megawatts (MW) of electrical power with an average annual production of 541 GWh. The unit, which is equipped with a Francis turbine, was first synchronized on January 19, 1983.
