= Paradise River Hydroelectric Generating Station =

Hydroelectric power station in Newfoundland

Coordinates: 47°37′04.49″N 54°25′51.82″W

The Paradise River Hydroelectric Generating Station is a hydroelectric generating plant located near the mouth of the Paradise River in Newfoundland and Labrador. The plant is owned by Newfoundland and Labrador Hydro, and was first synchronized in 1989. It operates with an average rated flow of 25 m3/s to generate 8 MW of electrical power, with an average annual production of 37 GWh. The unit is equipped with a Francis runner. The project, which operates under a run-of-river philosophy, has a 43m high concrete arch dam with an overflow spillway, the largest structure of this design in Eastern North America.
