= Gull Island, Labrador =

Island in Canada

Coordinates: 52°57′54.21″N 61°22′23.77″W

Gull Island is a small island in the Churchill river in Labrador, in the Province of Newfoundland and Labrador, Canada.

The island hosts a traditional Sheshatshiu gathering in September.
