= Sheshatshiu Innu First Nation =

First Nation in Newfoundland and Labrador, Canada

- Band No. 33
- People: Innu
- Headquarters: Sheshatshiu
- Province: Newfoundland and Labrador

Land
- Other reserve: Sheshatshiu 3
- Land area: 8.04 km^{2} (3.10 sq mi)

Population (2019)
- On reserve: 1600
- On other land: 9
- Off reserve: 196
- Total population: 1805

Government
- Chief: Eugene Hart

Website
- sheshatshiu.ca

The Sheshatshiu Innu First Nation is located in the province of Newfoundland and Labrador, Canada. This First Nations band government is centred on the community of Sheshatshiu.

The current chief of the Sheshatshiu Innu First Nation is Eugene Hart, who succeeded Andrew Penashue in 2015. The First Nation had a registered population of 1,805 people as of September 2019.

Labrador's Innu became status Indians under the Indian Act in 2002 and "Sheshatshiu 3" became a federal reserve in 2006.

In October 2019, the Sheshatshiu Innu First Nation declared a suicide crisis after 10 suicide attempts were reported within the community in a matter of days.

As of 2020, according to Innu Nation Grand Chief Gregory Rich, Sheshatshiu and Natuashish have a collective population of about 3,000 with about half of that being youths, of that 167 of them are in the care of the Manager of Child and Youth Services. In 2017, the Innu Nation stated that there are 165 Labrador Innu children in foster care, 80 of whom are placed outside their home communities of Sheshatshiu and Natuashish.
