= Cat Arm Hydroelectric Development =

Generator in Newfoundland, Canada

Coordinates: 50°01′33″N 56°45′53″W

The Cat Arm Generating Station is located on the Great Northern Peninsula of Newfoundland and makes use of 380.5 m of head between the reservoir and White Bay. Each of the two units operates with an average rated flow of 20 m3/s to generate a total 127 MW of electrical power with an average annual production of 733 GWh. The two 63.5 MW units, equipped with pelton turbines, were first synchronized on February 10 and 12, 1985.

The watershed of the Cat Arm River is located on a plateau with an average elevation of approximately 518 m on the raised uplands of the Long Range Mountains. The project involved the creation of a reservoir with a surface area of approximately 53 square kilometres by the erection of one main dam and seven smaller dams.
