= Brinco =

Canadian corporation (1953–1986)

Brinco Limited
- Industry: Resource Development
- Founded: 17 April 1953
- Defunct: 23 May 1986
- Fate: Merged with Dorset Resources
- Successor: Consolidated Brinco

The British Newfoundland Corporation Limited, and from 1971 onwards Brinco Limited, was incorporated by a consortium of British companies in 1953, which undertook industrial development opportunities in the province of Newfoundland and Labrador, Canada. The company was involved in the construction of the Churchill Falls Generating Station.

== History ==
The concept for BRINCO was conceived in 1952 by Premier of Newfoundland and Labrador Joey Smallwood, who sought to bring industrial development to the province. Smallwood travelled to the United Kingdom to court private sector companies, offering large tracts of undeveloped resource land in both the Labrador and Newfoundland areas of the province in exchange for guaranteeing the development of any natural resources discovered.

After numerous meetings with some of the political and industrial leaders, including Sir Winston Churchill and Anthony Gustav de Rothschild, Smallwood was successful in having seven large British corporations form a consortium to explore, investigate, and, where feasible, to develop natural resources in the province.

The seven founding firms are as follows;

- N M Rothschild & Sons
- Anglo-American Corporation of South Africa
- Bowater Paper Corporation
- English Electric Company Limited
- Frobisher Limited
- Rio Tinto Company Limited
- Anglo-Newfoundland Development Company Limited

They were joined by seventeen other firms before the principal agreement was signed with the Government of Newfoundland in 1953. These additional firms included Bank of Montreal, Royal Bank of Canada and Suez Canal Company.

On 30 May 1986, Brinco amalgamed with Dorset Resources Limited of Calgary to form Consolidated Brinco Limited. On 1 March 1992, Consolidated Brinco merged into Hillsborough Resources.

== Leadership ==
=== President ===
1. Bertie Charles Gardner, 17 April 1953 – 30 September 1958
2. Donald Gordon, 1 March 1967 – 2 May 1969 †
3. Donald Joseph McParland, 12 May 1969 – 11 November 1969 †
4. Sir John Norman Valette Duncan (interim), 16 November 1969 – 31 December 1969
5. William David Mulholland Jr., 1 January 1970 – 8 January 1974
6. Harry Windsor Macdonell, 8 January 1974 – 3 June 1975
7. Nixon Frank Crossley (interim), 3 June 1975 – 1 October 1975
8. Donald Robins de Laporte, 1 October 1975 – May 1978
9. Hugh Robin Snyder, July 1978 – June 1985
10. Clifford Alan Smith, 15 July 1985 – 23 May 1986

=== Chairman of the Board ===
1. Bertie Charles Gardner 30 September 1958 – 28 September 1959
2. Harold Greville Smith, 28 September 1959 – July 1963
3. Robert Henry Winters, July 1963 – 17 December 1965
4. Henry Borden, 17 December 1965 – 6 May 1970
5. Robert David Mulholland, 6 May 1970 – 20 March 1975
6. Sir John Norman Valette Duncan, 20 March 1975 – 18 December 1975 †
7. Sir Ronald Mark Cunliffe Turner, 14 January 1976 – 26 April 1979
8. Robert Baldwin Dale-Harris, 26 April 1979 – 18 December 1982 †
9. Harry Windsor Macdonell, 1982 – 1985

† = died in office

== Company histories ==
- Smith, Philip. Brinco: The Story of Churchill Falls. McClelland and Stewart, 1975.
