= Cape St. Francis (electoral district) =

Provincial electoral district in Newfoundland and Labrador, Canada

Newfoundland and Labrador electoral district
- Location in St. John's

Provincial electoral district
- Legislature: Newfoundland and Labrador House of Assembly
MHA
Joedy Wall
Progressive Conservative
- District created: 1962
- First contested: 1962
- Last contested: 2025

Demographics
- Population (2011): 13,215
- Electors (2015): 8,671
- Area (km²): 150
- Census division: Division No. 1
- Census subdivision(s): Torbay, Logy Bay-Middle Cove-Outer Cove, Pouch Cove, Flatrock, Bauline

Cape St. Francis is a provincial electoral district for the House of Assembly of Newfoundland and Labrador, Canada.

The vast majority of the district is made up of suburban communities neighbouring the provincial capital St. John's, though the district does take in the northeast end of the city. The majority of residents commute into St. John's daily for work. Prior to 1996, the district was named St. John's East Extern, though that riding did not contain the actual Cape St. Francis prior to 1975. That district was created in 1962 from St. John's East.

The district's boundaries encompass the northeastern tip of Avalon Peninsula, including the outer stretches of St. John's as well as Bauline, Flatrock, Logy Bay-Middle Cove-Outer Cove, Pouch Cove, and Torbay. Torbay is the largest community in the district.

The district has been a Progressive Conservative stronghold for over 60 years.

== Members of the House of Assembly ==
The district has elected the following members of the House of Assembly:

Assembly	Years	Member	Party
Riding created from St. John's East. St. John's East Extern
33rd	1962–1966	William Joseph Browne	Progressive Conservative
34th	1966–1971	Tom Hickey	Progressive Conservative
35th	1972–1972	Tom Hickey	Progressive Conservative
36th	1972–1975	Tom Hickey	Progressive Conservative
37th	1975–1979	Tom Hickey	Progressive Conservative
38th	1979–1982	Tom Hickey	Progressive Conservative
39th	1982–1985	Tom Hickey	Progressive Conservative
40th	1985–1986	Tom Hickey	Progressive Conservative
40th	1986–1989	Kevin Parsons Sr.	Progressive Conservative
41st	1989–1993	Kevin Parsons Sr.	Progressive Conservative
42nd	1993–1996	Jack Byrne	Progressive Conservative
Cape St. Francis
43rd	1996–1999	Jack Byrne	Progressive Conservative
44th	1999–2003	Jack Byrne	Progressive Conservative
45th	2003–2007	Jack Byrne	Progressive Conservative
46th	2007–2008	Jack Byrne	Progressive Conservative
46th	2008–2011	Kevin Parsons	Progressive Conservative
47th	2011–2015	Kevin Parsons	Progressive Conservative
48th	2015–2019	Kevin Parsons	Progressive Conservative
49th	2019–2021	Kevin Parsons	Progressive Conservative
50th	2021–2025	Joedy Wall	Progressive Conservative
51st	2025–present	Joedy Wall	Progressive Conservative

== Election results ==
Graph of election results (minor parties that never got 2% of the vote or did not run consistently are omitted) View source data.

2025 Newfoundland and Labrador general election
Party	Candidate	Votes	%	±%
Progressive Conservative	Joedy Wall	3,388	54.32	-8.19
Liberal	Kara Connors	2,457	39.39	+11.14
New Democratic	Greg Rockwood	392	6.29	-1.78
Total valid votes		6,237		
Total rejected ballots				
Turnout				
Eligible voters				
Progressive Conservative hold		Swing		-9.67

2021 Newfoundland and Labrador general election
Party	Candidate	Votes	%	±%
Progressive Conservative	Joedy Wall	3,476	62.51	-9.74
Liberal	Peter Whittle	1,571	28.25	+10.50
New Democratic	Phyllis Fleming	449	8.07	+1.77
NL Alliance	Ryan Lane	65	1.17	-2.54
Total valid votes		5,561		
Total rejected ballots				
Turnout				
Eligible voters				
Progressive Conservative hold		Swing		-10.12
Source(s) "Officially Nominated Candidates General Election 2021" (PDF). Elections Newfoundland and Labrador. "NL Election 2021 (Unofficial Results)".

2019 Newfoundland and Labrador general election
Party	Candidate	Votes	%	±%
Progressive Conservative	Kevin Parsons	4,539	72.24	+5.90
Liberal	Michael Duffy	1,115	17.75	-8.44
New Democratic	Peter Beck	396	6.30	-1.17
NL Alliance	Ryan Lane	233	3.71	–
Total valid votes		6,283	99.43	
Total rejected ballots		36	0.57	+0.08
Turnout		6,319	71.40	+0.03
Eligible voters		8,850		
Progressive Conservative hold		Swing		+7.17

2015 Newfoundland and Labrador general election
Party	Candidate	Votes	%	±%
Progressive Conservative	Kevin Parsons	4,086	66.34	+6.97
Liberal	Geoff Gallant	1,613	26.19	+23.26
New Democratic	Mark Gruchy	460	7.47	-30.22
Total valid votes		6,159	99.52	–
Total rejected ballots		30	0.48	-0.04
Turnout		6,189	71.38	+5.85
Eligible voters		8,671		
Progressive Conservative hold		Swing		-8.15
Source: Elections Newfoundland and Labrador

2011 Newfoundland and Labrador general election
Party	Candidate	Votes	%	±%
Progressive Conservative	Kevin Parsons	4,132	59.38	-9.59
New Democratic	Geoff Gallant	2,623	37.69	+14.29
Liberal	Joy Buckle	204	2.93	-4.70
Total valid votes		6,959	99.47	–
Total rejected ballots		37	0.53	–
Turnout		6,996	65.53	
Eligible voters		10,676		
Progressive Conservative hold		Swing		-11.94
Source: Elections Newfoundland and Labrador

Newfoundland and Labrador provincial by-election, August 27, 2008 upon the death of Jack Byrne
Party	Candidate	Votes	%	±%
Progressive Conservative	Kevin Parsons	2,865	68.97	-8.87
New Democratic	Kathleen Connors	972	23.40	+12.78
Liberal	Tonia Power-Mercer	317	7.63	-3.91
Total valid votes		4,154	99.74	–
Total rejected ballots		11	0.26	–
Turnout		4,165	42.01	-29.00
Eligible voters		9,914		
Progressive Conservative hold		Swing		-10.83
Source: Elections Newfoundland and Labrador

2007 Newfoundland and Labrador general election
Party	Candidate	Votes	%	±%
Progressive Conservative	Jack Byrne	4,983	77.84	+6.70
Liberal	Bill Tapper	739	11.54	-4.89
New Democratic	Kathleen Connors	680	10.62	-1.82
Total valid votes		6,402	99.50	–
Total rejected ballots		32	0.50	–
Turnout		6,434	71.01	
Eligible voters		9,061		
Progressive Conservative hold		Swing		+5.80
Source: Elections Newfoundland and Labrador

2003 Newfoundland and Labrador general election
Party	Candidate	Votes	%	±%
Progressive Conservative	Jack Byrne	5,604	71.14	+9.47
Liberal	Bill Tapper	1,294	16.43	-15.44
New Democratic	Ralph Tapper	980	12.44	+5.98
Total valid votes		7,878	99.58	–
Total rejected ballots		33	0.42	–
Turnout		7,911	66.49	+4.31
Eligible voters		11,898		
Progressive Conservative hold		Swing		+12.46
Source: Elections Newfoundland and Labrador

1999 Newfoundland and Labrador general election
Party	Candidate	Votes	%	±%
Progressive Conservative	Jack Byrne	4,197	61.67	+10.58
Liberal	Jim Martin	2,169	31.87	-17.04
New Democratic	Shawn Sullivan	440	6.46	+6.46
Total valid votes		6,806	99.72	–
Total rejected ballots		19	0.27	–
Turnout		6,825	62.18	-10.81
Eligible voters		10,171		
Progressive Conservative hold		Swing		+13.81
Source: Elections Newfoundland and Labrador

1996 Newfoundland and Labrador general election
Party	Candidate	Votes	%	±%
Progressive Conservative	Jack Byrne	3,299	51.09	+4.05
Liberal	Jim Martin	3,158	48.91	+10.51
Total valid votes		6,457	99.41	–
Total rejected ballots		38	0.59	–
Turnout		6,495	72.99	-4.46
Eligible voters		8,898		
Progressive Conservative hold		Swing		+7.28
Source: Elections Newfoundland and Labrador

1993 Newfoundland and Labrador general election
Party	Candidate	Votes	%	±%
Progressive Conservative	Jack Byrne	4,144	47.04	-1.80
Liberal	Sam Connors	3,383	38.40	+6.75
New Democratic	Cle Newhook	1,283	14.56	-4.95
Total valid votes		8,810	99.64	–
Total rejected ballots		32	0.36	–
Turnout		8,842	77.45	-8.12
Eligible voters		11,416		
Progressive Conservative hold		Swing		-4.28
Source: Elections Newfoundland and Labrador

1989 Newfoundland and Labrador general election
Party	Candidate	Votes	%	±%
Progressive Conservative	Kevin Parsons, Sr.	3,750	48.84	+2.77
Liberal	John O'Brien	2,430	31.65	+9.57
New Democratic	Cle Newhook	1,498	19.51	-12.34
Total valid votes		7,678	99.84	–
Total rejected ballots		12	0.16	–
Turnout		7,690	85.57	+17.16
Eligible voters		8,987		
Progressive Conservative hold		Swing		+6.17
Source: Elections Newfoundland and Labrador

Newfoundland and Labrador provincial by-election, December 9, 1986 upon the resignation of Tom Hickey
Party	Candidate	Votes	%	±%
Progressive Conservative	Kevin Parsons, Sr.	2,462	46.07	-9.59
New Democratic	Cle Newhook	1,702	31.85	+10.00
Liberal	Roger W. Carter	1,180	22.08	-0.41
Total valid votes		5,344	99.87	–
Total rejected ballots		7	0.13	–
Turnout		5,351	68.41	-12.09
Eligible voters		7,812		
Progressive Conservative hold		Swing		-9.80
Source: Elections Newfoundland and Labrador

1985 Newfoundland and Labrador general election
Party	Candidate	Votes	%	±%
Progressive Conservative	Tom Hickey	3,489	55.66	-16.98
Liberal	Thomas Fred Littlejohn	1,410	22.49	+2.22
New Democratic	Robert Anderson	1,370	21.85	+14.76
Total valid votes		6,269	99.68	–
Total rejected ballots		20	0.32	–
Turnout		6,289	80.50	-0.38
Eligible voters		7,812		
Progressive Conservative hold		Swing		-9.6
Source: Elections Newfoundland and Labrador

1982 Newfoundland and Labrador general election
Party	Candidate	Votes	%	±%
Progressive Conservative	Tom Hickey	4,795	72.64	+11.01
Liberal	David Wheeler	1,338	20.27	-10.17
New Democratic	Robert Anderson	468	7.09	-0.84
Total valid votes		6,601	99.77	–
Total rejected ballots		15	0.23	–
Turnout		6,616	80.88	+1.54
Eligible voters		8,180		
Progressive Conservative hold		Swing		+10.59
Source: Elections Newfoundland and Labrador

1979 Newfoundland and Labrador general election
Party	Candidate	Votes	%	±%
Progressive Conservative	Tom Hickey	3,989	61.63	-3.65
Liberal	Roland James Manning	1,970	30.44	-4.28
New Democratic	Ed Roche	513	7.93	+7.93
Total valid votes		6,472	99.72	–
Total rejected ballots		18	0.28	–
Turnout		6,490	79.34	-2.71
Eligible voters		8,180		
Progressive Conservative hold		Swing		-3.97
Source: Elections Newfoundland and Labrador

1975 Newfoundland general election
Party	Candidate	Votes	%	±%
Progressive Conservative	Tom Hickey	3,318	65.28	-13.64
Liberal	Michael J. Laurie	1,765	34.72	+13.64
Total valid votes		5,083	99.22	–
Total rejected ballots		40	0.78	–
Turnout		5,123	82.05	+9.04
Eligible voters		6,244		
Progressive Conservative hold		Swing		-13.64
Source: Elections Newfoundland and Labrador

1972 Newfoundland general election
Party	Candidate	Votes	%	±%
Progressive Conservative	Tom Hickey	8,039	78.92	
Liberal	Austin Ryan	2,147	21.08	
Total valid votes		10,186	99.35	–
Total rejected ballots		67	0.65	–
Turnout		10,253	73.01	
Eligible voters		14,042		
Progressive Conservative hold		Swing		
Source: Elections Newfoundland and Labrador

== See also ==
- List of Newfoundland and Labrador provincial electoral districts
- Canadian provincial electoral districts
