= 1833 =

1833 in various calendars
- Gregorian calendar: 1833; MDCCCXXXIII
- Ab urbe condita: 2586
- Armenian calendar: 1282; ԹՎ ՌՄՁԲ
- Assyrian calendar: 6583
- Balinese saka calendar: 1754–1755
- Bengali calendar: 1239–1240
- Berber calendar: 2783
- British Regnal year: 3 Will. 4 – 4 Will. 4
- Buddhist calendar: 2377
- Burmese calendar: 1195
- Byzantine calendar: 7341–7342
- Chinese calendar: 壬辰年 (Water Dragon); 4530 or 4323 — to — 癸巳年 (Water Snake); 4531 or 4324
- Coptic calendar: 1549–1550
- Discordian calendar: 2999
- Ethiopian calendar: 1825–1826
- Hebrew calendar: 5593–5594
- Hindu calendars
- Vikram Samvat: 1889–1890
- Shaka Samvat: 1754–1755
- Kali Yuga: 4933–4934
- Holocene calendar: 11833
- Igbo calendar: 833–834
- Iranian calendar: 1211–1212
- Islamic calendar: 1248–1249
- Japanese calendar: Tenpō 4 (天保４年)
- Javanese calendar: 1760–1761
- Julian calendar: Gregorian minus 12 days
- Korean calendar: 4166
- Minguo calendar: 79 before ROC 民前79年
- Nanakshahi calendar: 365
- Thai solar calendar: 2375–2376
- Tibetan calendar: ཆུ་ཕོ་འབྲུག་ལོ་ (male Water-Dragon); 1959 or 1578 or 806 — to — ཆུ་མོ་སྦྲུལ་ལོ་ (female Water-Snake); 1960 or 1579 or 807

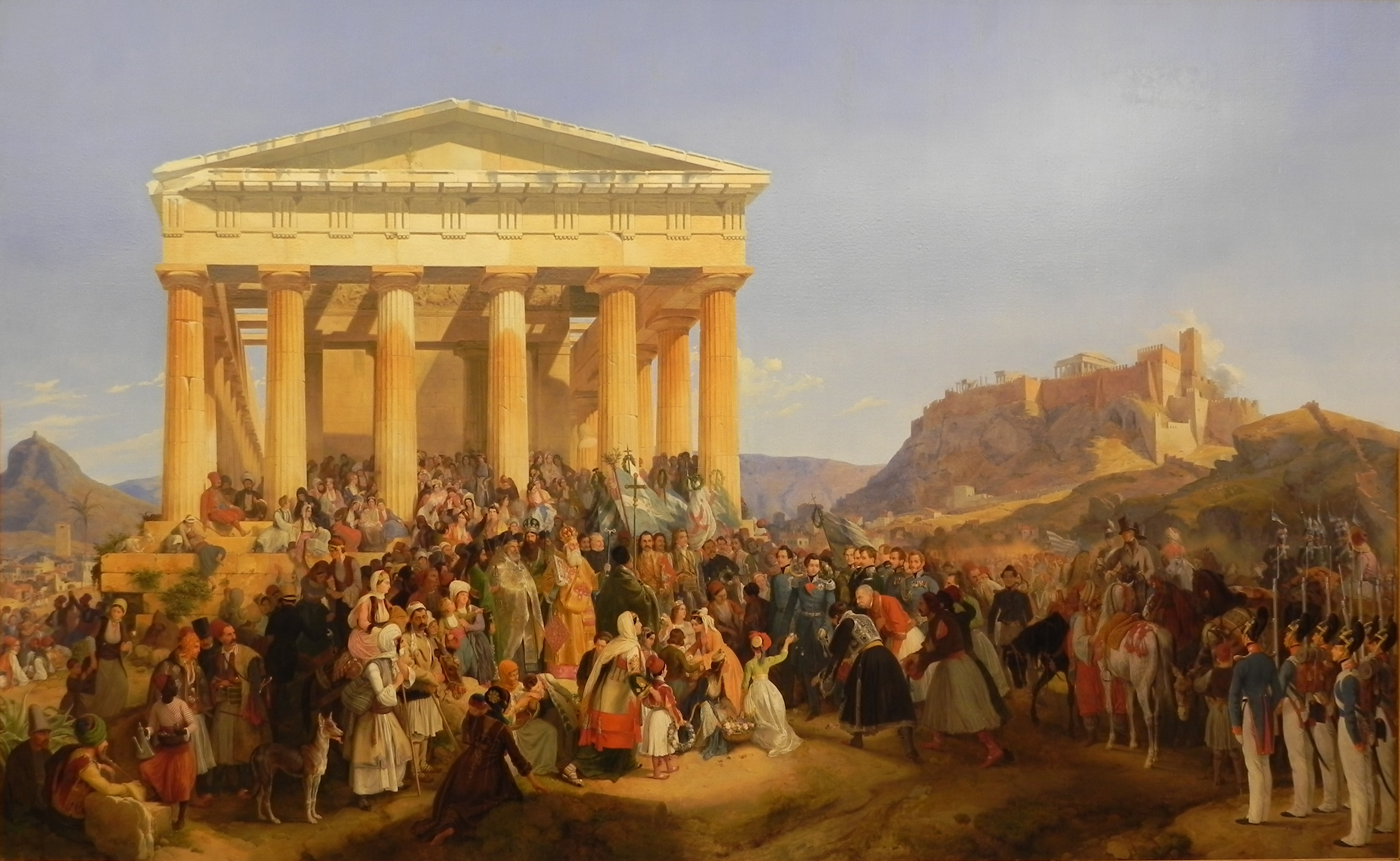
February 6: Prince Otto of Bavaria arrives at the newly-independent Kingdom of Greece, landing at its capital, the port of Nafplio, to become King Othon the First.

July 5: The Battle of Cape St. Vincent is fought off the coast of Portugal between the forces of King Miguel I and the former Queen Maria II.

1833 (MDCCCXXXIII) was a common year starting on Tuesday of the Gregorian calendar and a common year starting on Sunday of the Julian calendar, the 1833rd year of the Common Era (CE) and Anno Domini (AD) designations, the 833rd year of the 2nd millennium, the 33rd year of the 19th century, and the 4th year of the 1830s decade. As of the start of 1833, the Gregorian calendar was 12 days ahead of the Julian calendar, which remained in localized use until 1923.

== Events ==
=== January–March ===
- January 3 – The United Kingdom reasserts British sovereignty over the Falkland Islands in the South Atlantic Ocean.
- February 6 – Prince Otto Friedrich Ludwig of Bavaria arrives at the port of Nafplio to assume the title King Othon the First of Greece.
- February 16 – The United States Supreme Court hands down its landmark decision of Barron v. Mayor and City Council of Baltimore.

=== April–June ===
- April 1 – General Antonio López de Santa Anna is elected President of Mexico by the legislatures of 16 of the 18 Mexican states. During his frequent absences from office to fight on the battlefield, Santa Anna turns the duties of government over to his vice president, Valentín Gómez Farías.
- April 18 – Over 300 delegates from England, Scotland, Wales and Ireland travel to the office of the Prime Minister, the Earl Grey, to call for the immediate abolition of slavery throughout the British Empire.
- May 6
  - In Germany, Carl Friedrich Gauss and Wilhelm Weber obtain permission to build an electromagnetic telegraph in Göttingen.
  - The Ottoman Empire promulgates a firman ratifying the Peace Agreement of Kütahya, bringing an end to the Egyptian-Ottoman War.
  - In Alexandria, Virginia, an attack is made on U.S. President Andrew Jackson.
- May 10 – The Le Van Khoi revolt breaks out in southern Vietnam against Emperor Minh Mang, who has desecrated the deceased mandarin Le Van Duyet.
- May 11 – At least 170 people—and perhaps as many as 265—are killed when the British brig Lady of the Lake sinks off Cape St. Francis at Newfoundland. Only 15 people survive.
- May 25 – The Chilean Constitution of 1833 is promulgated.
- June 5 – Ada Lovelace and Charles Babbage, both pioneers in developing a computer, are introduced to each other by Mary Somerville.
- June 9 – Dubai secedes from Abu Dhabi.
- June 29 – An earthquake at Fort Nisqually is experienced by William Fraser Tolmie; his journal entry records the first written eyewitness account of an earthquake in the Puget Sound region.

=== July–September ===
- July 5 – Liberal Wars: The forces of Queen Maria II of Portugal win the Battle of Cape St. Vincent, defeating the supporters of her uncle, King Miguel, who usurped the throne in 1828.
- July 8 – The Treaty of Hünkâr İskelesi creates an alliance between the Ottoman Empire and the Russian Empire.
- July 14 – At Oxford University, John Keble preaches a sermon against the Church Temporalities (Ireland) Act 1833. Keble's sermon, published afterwards published as National Apostasy, is traditionally considered as the beginning of the Oxford Movement of High Church Anglicans.
- July 20 – A mob in Jackson County, Missouri, destroys the printing office of the early Church of Jesus Christ of Latter-day Saints containing what becomes known as The Doctrine and Covenants.
- August 1 – King William's College opens on the Isle of Man.
- August 12 – The settlement of Chicago is established by 350 settlers at the estuary of the Chicago River in the U.S. state of Illinois.
- August 18 – The Canadian ship SS Royal William sets out from Pictou, Nova Scotia on a 25-day passage of the Atlantic Ocean, primarily under steam, to Gravesend in England.
- August 20 – Future United States President Benjamin Harrison is born in Ohio. From this date until the death of Former U.S. President James Madison on June 28 1836, a total of 18 Presidents of the United States (2 former, 1 current, and 15 future) are living; which is more than any other time period in U.S. history.
- August 26 – The Canton of Basel is partitioned by the Swiss Tagsatzung to create the two half-cantons of Basel-City and Basel-Country.
- August 28 – The British Slavery Abolition Act 1833, beginning the process of giving slaves in much of the British Empire their freedom, receives royal assent, with an effective date of August 1, 1834. A £20 million fund is established to compensate slaveowners.
- August 29 – The Parliament of the United Kingdom votes to pass the Factory Acts, limiting child labour.
- August 31 – The chartered ship Amphitrite sinks off Boulogne-sur-Mer while transporting 108 British female convicts and 12 children from Woolwich in England to New South Wales in what is now Australia. All of the passengers die, along with 13 of the 16 crew, leaving 3 survivors.
- September 2 – Oberlin College is founded in the U.S. at Oberlin, Ohio.
- September 6 – At least 6,000 people are killed when an 8.0 magnitude earthquake shakes the Chinese province of Yunnan destroying buildings, homes and temples.
- September 29 – Three-year-old Isabella II becomes Queen of Spain, under the regency of her mother, Maria Christina of the Two Sicilies. Her uncle Don Carlos, Conde de Molina challenges her claim, beginning the First Carlist War.

=== October–December ===
- October 20 – Alfred, Lord Tennyson, publishes his oft-quoted poem, Ulysses.
- November 12–13 – A very spectacular occurrence of the Leonid meteor shower is observed all over North America, and is the inspiration for the song "Stars Fell on Alabama".
- November 25 – An 8.7 magnitude earthquake strikes Sumatra in what is now Indonesia.
- December – The American Anti-Slavery Society is founded.
- December 14 – Kaspar Hauser, the well known and mysterious German youth, is fatally stabbed. He dies three days later on December 17.
- December 18 – The national anthem of the Russian Empire, God Save the Tsar!, is first performed.

=== Date unknown ===
- The dawn of biochemistry: The first enzyme, diastase, is discovered by Anselme Payen.
- Greece recaptures the Acropolis of Athens.
- H.R.H. Prince Mongkut of Siam founds the Dhammayut Buddhist reform movement.
- American healthcare brand McKesson Corporation established as a partnership.
- Foundation of:
  - Kalamazoo College in Kalamazoo, Michigan.
  - Madras College in St Andrews, Scotland.

== Births ==
=== January–June ===
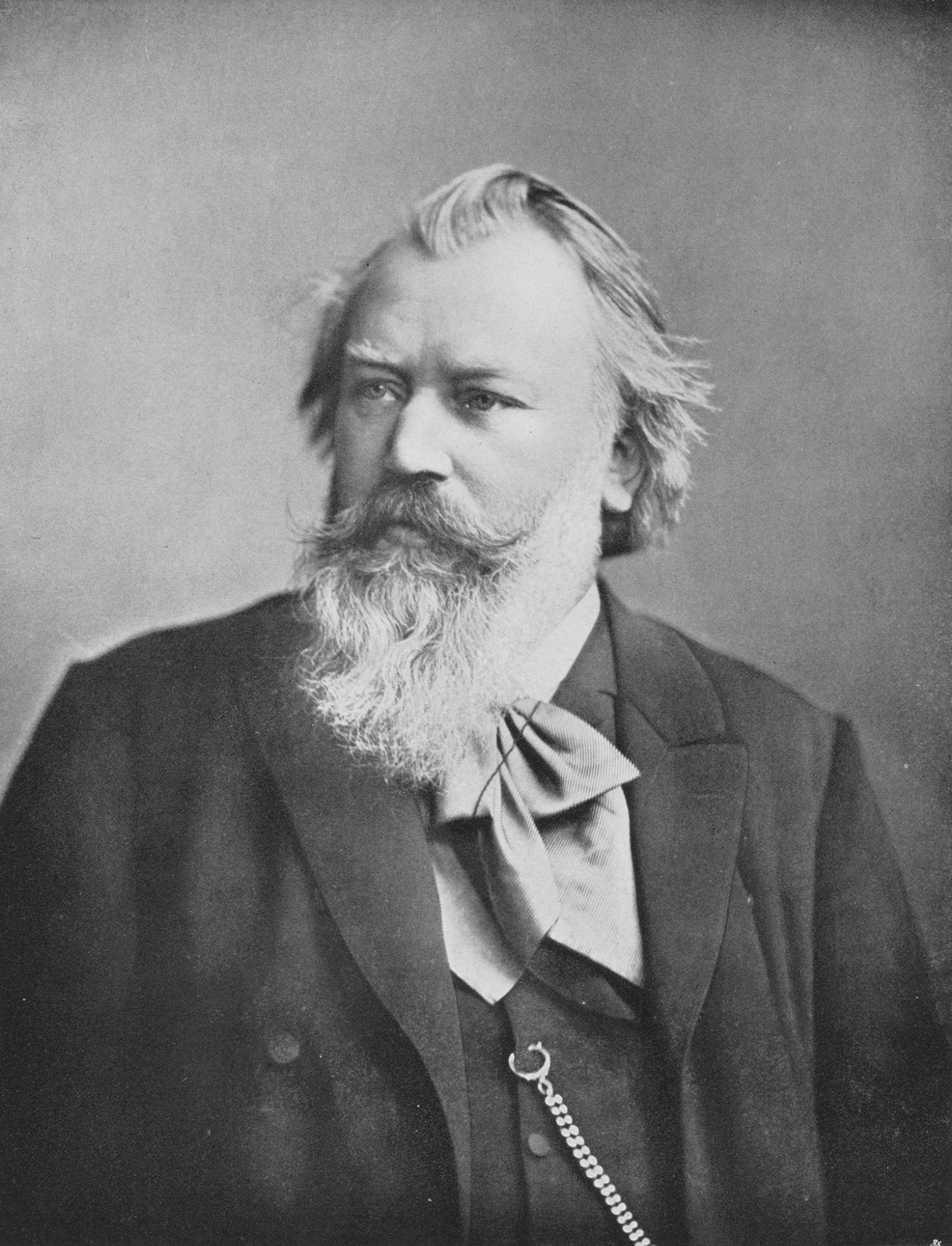
Johannes Brahms

- January 1 – Robert Lawson, New Zealand architect (d. 1902)
- January 5 – Eugene W. Hilgard, German-American "Father of soil science" (d. 1916)
- January 7 – Sir Henry Roscoe, English chemist (d. 1915)
- January 18 – Joseph S. Skerrett, American admiral (d. 1897)
- January 28 – Charles George Gordon, British army officer, administrator (d. 1885)
- February 3 – Abu Bakar of Johor, Malaysian sultan (d. 1895)
- February 6 – J. E. B. Stuart, American Confederate general (d. 1864)
- February 11 – Melville Fuller, 8th Chief Justice of the United States Supreme Court (d. 1910)
- February 19 – Élie Ducommun, Swiss journalist, activist, recipient of the Nobel Peace Prize (d. 1906)
- February 23 – Alfons Grotowski, Polish sanitary engineer (d. 1922)
- February 25 – John St. John, American temperance movement leader (d. 1916)
- February 28 – Alfred von Schlieffen, German field marshal (d. 1913)
- March 10 – Dimitrie Sturdza, 4-time prime minister of Romania (d. 1914)
- March 14 – Lucy Hobbs Taylor, American dentist (d. 1910)
- March 15 – Géza Fejérváry, 16th Prime Minister of Hungary (d. 1914)
- March 20 – Daniel Dunglas Home, Scottish medium (d. 1886)
- March 22 – Manuel Ruiz Zorrilla, Prime Minister of Spain (d. 1895)
- April 6 – Luis Cordero Crespo, 14th President of Ecuador (d. 1912)
- April 11 – Fredrik von Otter, 8th Prime Minister of Sweden (d. 1910)
- May 5 – Lazarus Fuchs, German mathematician (d. 1902)
- May 7 – Johannes Brahms, German composer (d. 1897)
- May 9 – Hermann von Spaun, Austro-Hungarian admiral (d. 1919)
- May 26 – Edward William Godwin, English architect (d. 1886)
- June 1 – John Marshall Harlan, Associate Justice of the Supreme Court of the United States (d. 1911)
- June 4 – Garnet Wolseley, 1st Viscount Wolseley, British field marshal (d. 1913)
- June 21 – Domenico Morea, Italian priest, educator and historian (d. 1902)
- June 24
  - Gustaf Åkerhielm, 6th Prime Minister of Sweden (d. 1900)
  - Alfred William Bennett, English botanist (d. 1902)

=== July–December ===
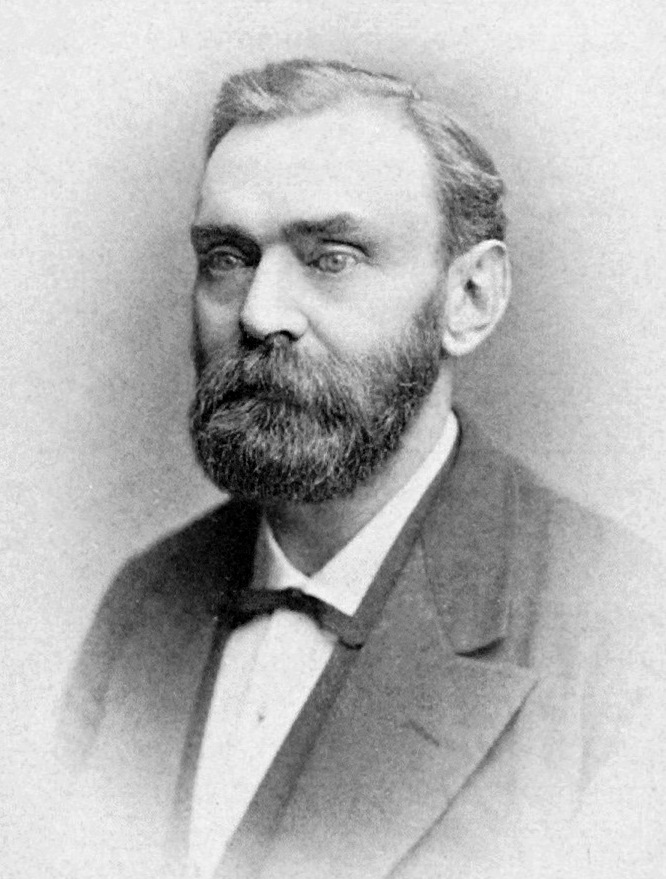
Alfred Nobel

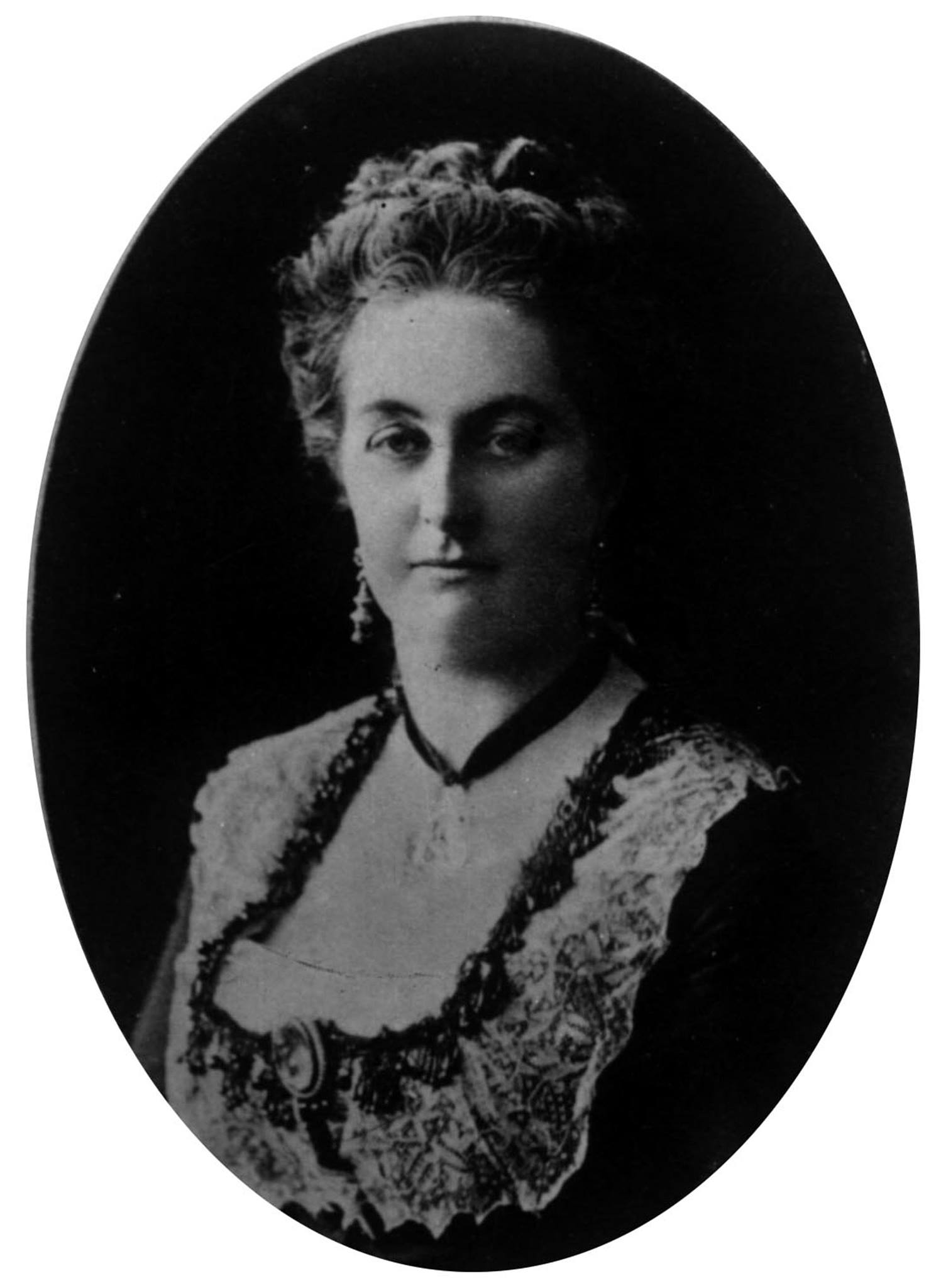
Eliza Lynch

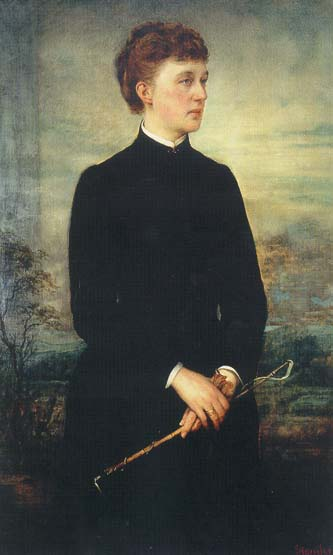
Princess Adelheid-Marie of Anhalt-Dessau

- July 7 – Félicien Rops, Belgian artist (d. 1898)
- July 14 – Alfred Biliotti, Italian Levantine British consular officer and archaeologist (d. 1915)
- July 26 – Gheorghe Manu, 17th Prime Minister of Romania (d. 1911)
- July 27 – Thomas George Bonney, English geologist (d. 1923)
- August 3 – Auguste Schmidt, German educator, women's rights activist (d. 1902)
- August 9 – Emily Pepys, English child diarist (d. 1877)
- August 16 – Eliza Ann Otis, American poet, newspaper publisher and philanthropist (d. 1904)
- August 20 – Benjamin Harrison, 23rd President of the United States (d. 1901)
- August 31 – Carlo Alberto Racchia, Italian admiral and politician (d. 1896)
- September 2 – Henry Hotze, Swiss American Confederate propagandist (d. 1887)
- September 20 – Ernesto Teodoro Moneta, Italian pacifist, recipient of the Nobel Peace Prize (d. 1918)
- September 22 – Gheorghe Grigore Cantacuzino, twice Prime Minister of Romania (d. 1913)
- October 2 – William Corby, American Catholic priest (d. 1897)
- October 20 – Mary F. Eastman, American educator, lecturer, writer and suffragist (d. 1908)
- October 21 – Alfred Nobel, Swedish inventor of dynamite, creator of the Nobel Prize (d. 1896)
- October 23 – Antonio Flores Jijón, 13th President of Ecuador (d. 1915)
- November 6 – Jonas Lie, Norwegian author (d. 1908)
- November 9 – Émile Gaboriau, French writer (d. 1873)
- November 12 – Alexander Borodin, Russian composer (d. 1887)
- November 13 – Edwin Booth, American tragedian (d. 1893)
- November 14 – Sir Hugh Gough, British general, Victoria Cross recipient (d. 1909)
- November 19 – Eliza Lynch, First Lady of Paraguay (d. 1886)
- November 27 – Princess Mary Adelaide of Cambridge (d. 1897)
- November 30 – Frederick Richards British admiral (d. 1912)
- December 7 – Rodrigo Augusto da Silva, Brazilian Senator, author of the Golden Law (d. 1889)
- December 13 – Petre S. Aurelian, 19th Prime Minister of Romania (d. 1909)
- December 20 – Samuel Mudd, American doctor to John Wilkes Booth (d. 1883)
- December 25 – Princess Adelheid-Marie of Anhalt-Dessau (d. 1916)

=== Date unknown ===
- Margaret Fox, American medium (d. 1893)
- Fu Shanxiang, Chinese scholar, Chancellor (d. 1864)

== Deaths ==
=== January–June ===
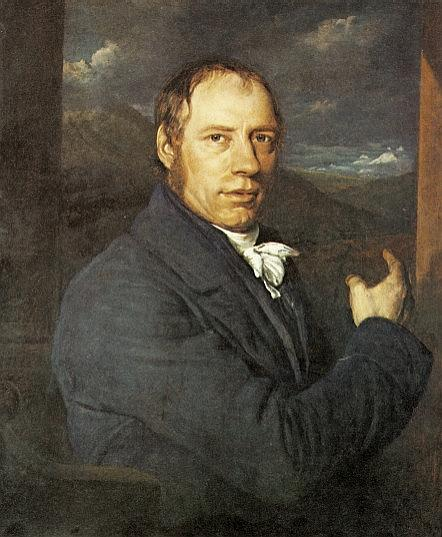
Richard Trevithick

- January 10 – Adrien-Marie Legendre, French mathematician (b. 1752)
- January 16 – Princess Paula of Brazil (b. 1823)
- January 16 – Nannette Streicher, German piano maker, composer, music educator and writer (b. 1769)
- January 16 – Banastre Tarleton, British general, politician (b. 1754)
- January 23 – Edward Pellew, 1st Viscount Exmouth, British admiral (b. 1757)
- March 13 – William Bradley, British naval officer, cartographer (b. 1758)
- April 6 – Adamantios Korais, Greek scholar (b. 1748)
- April 7
  - Antoni Radziwiłł, Polish politician (b. 1775)
  - Jacques Réattu, French artist (b. 1760)
- April 22 – Richard Trevithick, English inventor (b. 1771)
- May 5 – Sophia Campbell, Australian artist (b. 1777)
- May 15 – Edmund Kean, British actor (b. 1787)
- May 23 – Francesca Anna Canfield, American linguist, poet and translator (b. 1803)
- June 1 – Oliver Wolcott Jr., American lawyer, politician, 2nd United States Secretary of the Treasury, 24th Governor of Connecticut (b. 1760)
- June 2 – Simon Byrne, Irish prizefighter (b. 1806)

=== July–December ===
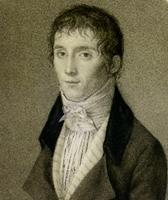
Nicéphore Niépce

- July 2 – Gervasio Antonio de Posadas, Argentine leader (b. 1757)
- July 5 – Nicéphore Niépce, French photography pioneer (b. 1765)
- July 11 – Yagan, Noongar indigenous Australian warrior (killed) (b. c. 1795)
- July 12 – Samuel Sterett, American politician (b. 1758)
- July 19 – George Leveson-Gower, 1st Duke of Sutherland, British landowner (b. 1758)
- July 20 – Ninian Edwards, American politician, Governor of and Senator from Illinois (b. 1775)
- July 22 – Joseph Forlenze, Italian ophthalmologist (b. 1757)
- July 23 – Anselmo de la Cruz, Chilean political figure (b. 1777)
- July 26 – Thomas Knapton, English mariner, executed (b. c. 1816)
- July 29 – William Wilberforce, English politician, abolitionist (b. 1759)
- August 9 – Godfrey Higgins, English archaeologist (b. 1772)
- August 14 – Placidus a Spescha, Swiss mountain climber (b. 1752)
- September – James Farquhar, Scottish politician (b. 1764)
- September 7 – Hannah More, English religious writer, Romantic, and philanthropist (b. 1745)
- September 15 – Arthur Hallam, English poet (b. 1811)
- September 27 – Ram Mohan Roy, Hindu reformer (b. 1772)
- September 29 – King Ferdinand VII of Spain (b. 1784)
- October 3 – François, marquis de Chasseloup-Laubat, French general (b. 1754)
- October 4 – Maria Jane Jewsbury, English poet and literary reviewer (b. 1800)
- October 16
  - Andrey Bolotov, Russian agriculturalist and memoirist (b. 1738)
  - Meno Haas, German-born copperplate engraver (b. 1752)
- November 16 – John McMillan, Presbyterian minister, missionary in Pennsylvania (b. 1752)
- November 23 – Jean-Baptiste Jourdan, French marshal (b. 1762)
- December 17 – Kaspar Hauser, German youth of uncertain origin (stabbed) (b. 1812?)
