= St. John's metropolitan area =

- Census Metropolitan Area
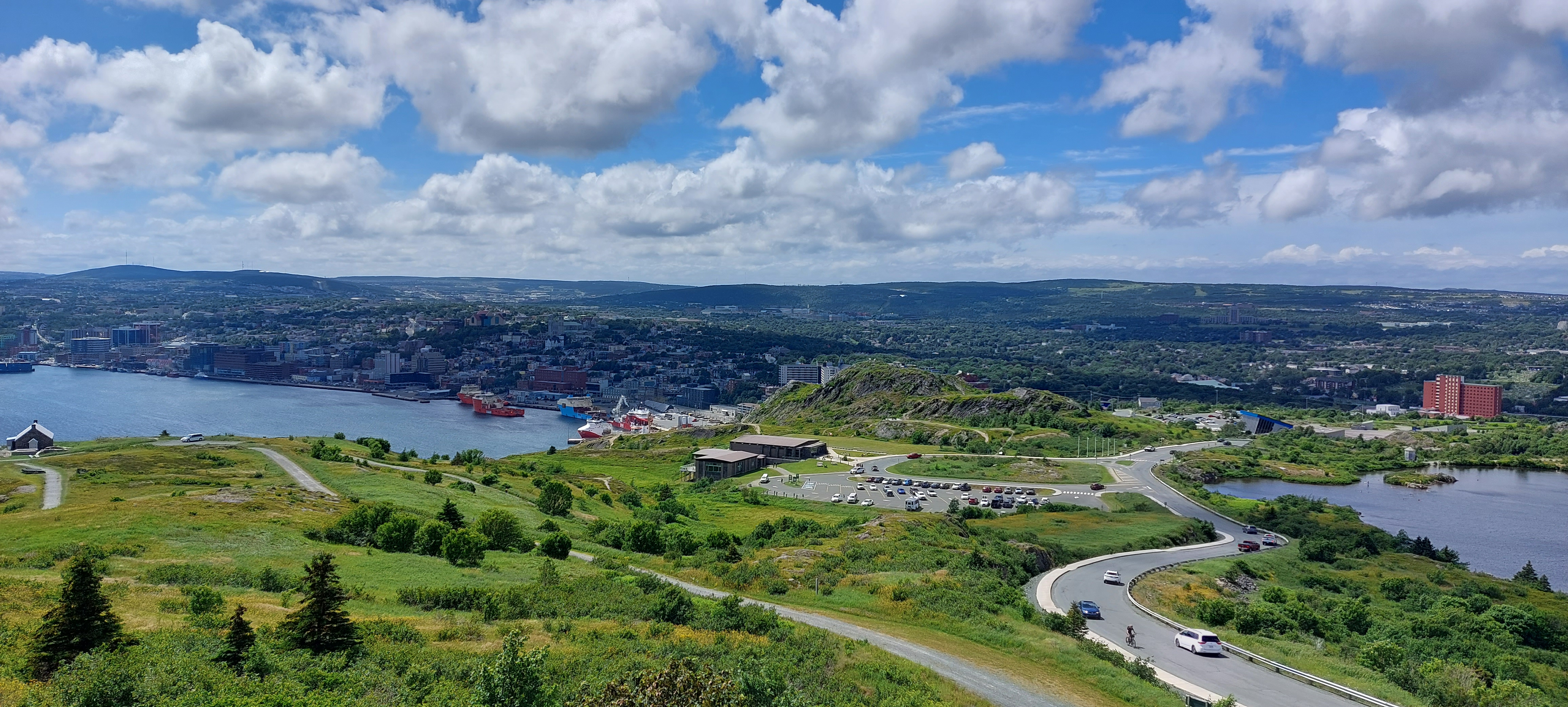
- Downtown St. John's from Signal Hill
Interactive Map of St. John's, NL CMA
City of St. John's
St. John's, NL CMA
- Coordinates: 47°34′3″N 52°42′26″W
- Country: Canada
- Province: Newfoundland and Labrador
- Census division: Division 1
- Largest city: St. John's
- Other towns and cities: Conception Bay South; Paradise; Mount Pearl

Government
  - MPs: List of MPs: Tom Osborne (LIB); Joanne Thompson (L); Paul Connors (L)
  - MHAs: List of MHAs: John Abbott (LIB); Siobhán Coady (LIB); John Hogan (LIB); Bernard Davis (LIB); Jim Dinn (NDP); Paul Lane (IND); Loyola O'Driscoll (PC); Jamie Korab (LIB); Sarah Stoodley (LIB); Paul Dinn (PC); Barry Petten (PC); Helen Conway-Ottenheimer (PC); Fred Hutton (LIB); Lucy Stoyles (LIB)

Area
  - Metro: 931.56 km^{2} (359.68 sq mi)

Population (2021)
  - Metro: 212,579
  - Metro density: 228.2/km^{2} (591/sq mi)
- 22nd Largest metropolitan area in Canada

Gross Metropolitan Product
  - St. John's CMA: CA$12.9 billion (2020)
- Time zone: UTC-3:30 (NST)
  - Summer (DST): UTC-2:30 (NDT)
- Area code: 709

The St. John's metropolitan area is the most populous census metropolitan area (CMA) in the Canadian province of Newfoundland and Labrador. With a population of 212,579 in the 2021 Canadian Census, the CMA is the second largest in Atlantic Canada and the 22nd largest CMA in Canada.

The St. John's CMA has an estimated population of 239,316 as of 2024. The CMA comprises the City of St. John's and twelve other communities, the largest of which are the town of Conception Bay South and the city of Mount Pearl.

== Demographics ==
The following information is from: Statistics Canada

=== Population ===
Historical population
Year	Pop.	±%
1986	164,593	—
1991	175,391	+6.6%
1996	174,051	−0.8%
2001	172,918	−0.7%
2006	181,113	+4.7%
2011	196,966	+8.8%
2016	208,418	+5.8%
2021	212,579	+2.0%

=== Municipalities ===
Municipality	Type	2001	2006	2011	2016	2021
St. John's	City	99,182	100,646	106,172	108,860	110,525
Conception Bay South	Town	19,772	21,966	24,848	26,199	27,168
Paradise	Town	9,598	12,584	17,695	21,389	22,975
Mount Pearl	City	24,964	24,671	24,284	22,957	22,447
Portugal Cove – St. Philip's	Town	5,866	6,575	7,366	8,147	8,415
Torbay	Town	5,474	6,281	7,397	7,899	7,852
Holyrood	Town	1,906	2,005	1,995	2,463	2,471
Logy Bay – Middle Cove – Outer Cove	Town	1,872	1,978	2,098	2,221	2,364
Pouch Cove	Town	1,669	1,756	1,866	2,069	2,063
Flatrock	Town	1,138	1,214	1,457	1,683	1,722
Witless Bay	Town	1,056	1,070	1,179	1,619	1,640
Bay Bulls	Town	1,014	1,078	1,283	1,500	1,566
Petty Harbour – Maddox Cove	Town	949	915	924	960	947
Bauline	Town	364	379	397	452	412

=== Population density ===
Rank	Municipality	Population	Land Area		Population Density	
Rank	Municipality	Population	km^{2}	mi^{2}	/km^{2}	/mi^{2}
-	St. John's metropolitan area	205,955	804.65	310.68	244.8	634
1	St. John's	108,860	446.04	172.22	238.0	616
2	Conception Bay South	26,199	59.27	22.88	419.2	1,086
3	Mount Pearl	22,957	15.75	6.08	1,542.1	3,994
4	Paradise	21,389	29.24	11.29	605.2	1,567
5	Portugal Cove – St. Philip's	8,147	57.35	22.14	128.4	333
6	Torbay	7,899	34.88	13.47	212.1	549
7	Logy Bay – Middle Cove – Outer Cove	2,221	16.98	6.56	123.6	320
8	Pouch Cove	2,069	58.34	22.53	32.0	83
9	Flatrock	1,683	18.12	7.00	80.4	208
10	Witless Bay	1,619	18.49	7.14	67.4	175
11	Bay Bulls	1,500	30.74	11.87	41.7	108
12	Petty Harbour – Maddox Cove	960	4.51	1.74	205.1	531
13	Bauline	452	15.95	6.16	24.9	64
