= Newfoundland and Labrador Route 20 =

Highway in Newfoundland and Labrador, Canada

Route 20
- Torbay Road, Torbay Bypass, Pouch Cove Highway, Main Road

Route information
- Maintained by Newfoundland and Labrador Department of Transportation and Infrastructure
- Length: 30.2 km (18.8 mi)

Major junctions
- South end: Route 30 / Kenna’s Hill in St. John's
- The Parkway (Macdonald Drive) in St. John’s; Route 1 (TCH) in St. John’s; Route 30 in Torbay; Route 21 in Torbay
- North end: Cape St. Francis

Location
- Country: Canada
- Province: Newfoundland and Labrador

Highway system
- Highways in Newfoundland and Labrador
← Route 13	→ Route 21

Route 20 is a 30.2-kilometre-long (18.8 mi) provincial highway in Newfoundland and Labrador, extending from St. John's to the towns of Torbay, Flatrock, Shoe Cove, Pouch Cove, and the point of Cape St. Francis. Route 20 is located entirely on the Avalon Peninsula of Newfoundland.

== Route description ==
The road begins in the east end of St. John's, where Kenna's Hill forks into two branches: Torbay Road (Route 20) and Logy Bay Road (Route 30).

Within the city of St. John's, Torbay Road is both a major arterial road and a significant commercial area, with many strip malls as well as the Torbay Road Mall and, north of the Trans-Canada Highway, the Stavanger Drive big-box retail area. The road is heavily travelled in the mornings and evenings as workers commute into and out of the city. At a point approximately 7 kilometres north of its southern terminus, Torbay Road continues northerly through the community of Torbay, while Route 20 transfers onto the Torbay Bypass. Completed in late 2011, the two-lane bypass diverts around Torbay, with access to the major intersecting roads of Indian Meal Line and Bauline Line; prior to its construction, the highway number continued through the centre of Torbay along Torbay Road.

About 7 kilometres further north near Flatrock, Torbay Road and the Torbay Bypass reunite; both road names end at that point, while the highway number continues northerly for 9.6 kilometres under the name Pouch Cove Highway to the community of Pouch Cove, where it becomes Main Road and continues for 5.5 kilometres to the highway's northern terminus at the Cape St. Francis lighthouse in Biscayan Cove.

== Major intersections ==
Location	km	mi	Destinations	Notes
St. John's	0.0	0.0	Route 30 north (Logy Bay Road) – Logy Bay-Middle Cove-Outer Cove; Kenna's Hill - Downtown	Southern terminus of Route 20 and Route 30; Y-Intersection; road continues south as Kenna's Hill
St. John's	1.5	0.93	The Parkway (Macdonald Drive)	
St. John's	3.5– 3.9	2.2– 2.4	Route 1 (TCH) west (Outer Ring Road) – Mount Pearl, Clarenville	Exit 48 A/B on Route 1 eastbound; no access to eastbound Route 1 from Route 20; no access to Route 20 from Route 1 westbound. Next Intersections Are Stavanger Drive, Hebron Way, RCAF Road, And Pine Line (Route 20-21).
Torbay	6.9	4.3	Torbay Road To Route 30 south (Middle Cove Road) – Torbay, Logy Bay-Middle Cove-Outer Cove	Route 20 begins following the Torbay Bypass
Torbay	9.5	5.9	Indian Meal Line (Route 20-16) - Torbay, Portugal Cove–St. Philip's	Turn Right To Go To Downtown And Torbay Beach, Or Turn Left To Go To Portugal Cove.
Torbay	11.4	7.1	Route 21 north (Bauline Line) – Bauline	Southern terminus of Route 21, Provides Access To Downtown, Bauline Line Extension (Route 40-15) To Portugal Cove, Town Of Bauline, Pouch Cove Line (Route 20-19) To Pouch Cove, And Bauline Harbour. Next Major Intersection After Route 21 Is The Former Route 20, From Downtown.
Torbay	14.6	9.1	Torbay Road - Torbay	Route 20 begins following Pouch Cove Highway. Next Major Intersection Is Windgap Road (Route 20-17) From Torbay.
Pouch Cove	24.2	15.0	Pouch Cove Line (Route 20-19) - Bauline	
Biscayan Cove	30.2	18.8	Dead End at Cape St. Francis Lighthouse	Northern terminus
1.000 mi = 1.609 km; 1.000 km = 0.621 mi: Incomplete access; Route transition

== See also ==
- List of Newfoundland and Labrador highways
