= Jack Byrne (politician) =

Canadian politician

Member of the Newfoundland and Labrador House of Assmebly for Cape St. Francis St. John's East Extern (1993-1996)
- In office May 3, 1993 – June 4, 2008
- Preceded by: Kevin Parsons Sr.
- Succeeded by: Kevin Parsons

Provincial Minister of Municipal & Provincial Affairs, Registrar General, Minister Responsible for Emergency preparedness, And Minister Responsible for the NL Housing Corporation
- In office 2003–2007
- Succeeded by: Dave Denine

Mayor of Logy Bay-Middle Cove-Outer Cove, NL
- In office 1986–1993

Personal details
- Born: June 2, 1951 Torbay, Newfoundland and Labrador
- Died: June 4, 2008 (aged 57) St. John's, Newfoundland and Labrador
- Party: Progressive Conservative

Jack Byrne (June 2, 1951 – June 4, 2008) was a Canadian politician. He represented the riding of Cape St. Francis in the Newfoundland and Labrador House of Assembly. He was a member of the Progressive Conservatives.

== Politics ==
Formerly the mayor of Logy Bay-Middle Cove-Outer Cove from 1986 to 1993, he was first elected to the House in the 1993 provincial election representing the district of St. John's East Extern. He moved to the redistricted riding of Cape St. Francis in the 1996 election, and represented that district until his death.

He served as Minister of Municipal Affairs from 2003 to 2007 and from 2007 till his death he served as Deputy Speaker of the Newfoundland and Labrador House of Assembly.

He won five consecutive elections (1993, 1996, 1999, 2003, 2007)

Byrne had been treated during the 1990s for a tumour on his pituitary gland and died on June 4, 2008.

== Arena ==
On October 24, 2008, the Jack Byrne Arena opened in Torbay, Newfoundland and Labrador with an appreciation night dedicated to Jack Byrne, his wife Bridget and son Matthew dropped the first puck in the new stadium for a hockey game between Torbay and Bell Island.

== Electoral record ==
2007 Newfoundland and Labrador general election
Party	Candidate	Votes	%	±%
Progressive Conservative	Jack Byrne	4,983	77.83%	+6.7
Liberal	Bill Tapper	739	11.54%	-4.89
NDP	Kathleen Connors	680	10.62%	-1.82
Total		6,402		

2003 Newfoundland and Labrador general election
Party	Candidate	Votes	%	±%
Progressive Conservative	Jack Byrne	5604	71.13%	+9.47
Liberal	Bill Tapper	1294	16.43%	-15.43
NDP	Ralph Tapper	980	12.44%	+5.98

1999 Newfoundland and Labrador general election
Party	Candidate	Votes	%	±%
Progressive Conservative	Jack Byrne	4197	61.66%	+10.57
Liberal	Jim Martin	2169	31.86%	-17.05
NDP	Shawn Sullivan	440	6.46%	+6.46

1996 Newfoundland and Labrador general election
Party	Candidate	Votes	%	±%
Progressive Conservative	Jack Byrne	3299	51.09%	
Liberal	Jim Martin	3158	48.91%	
