= Kevin Parsons =

Kevin Parsons may refer to:

- Kevin Parsons (politician) (born 1961), Canadian politician
- Kevin Parsons (cricketer) (born 1973), former English cricketer
- Kevin Parsons Sr. (1930–2013), Canadian politician
