= Tom Hickey (politician) =

Canadian politician (1933–2020)

Thomas Valentine Hickey MHA

MHA for St. John's East Extern
- In office 1966–1986
- Succeeded by: Kevin Parsons Sr.

Leader of the Newfoundland and Labrador First Party
- In office 2004–2008
- Preceded by: Position established
- Succeeded by: Wayne Bennett

Personal details
- Born: February 14, 1933 Outer Cove, Dominion of Newfoundland
- Died: January 2, 2020 (aged 86)
- Party: Progressive Conservative Party of Newfoundland and Labrador
- Spouse: Mary Tobin
- Children: 1

Thomas Valentine Hickey (14 February 1933 – 2 January 2020) was a Canadian politician. He represented the electoral district of Cape St. Francis in the Newfoundland and Labrador House of Assembly from 1966 to 1986 as a member of the Progressive Conservative Party of Newfoundland and Labrador.

The son of Thomas and Mary Hickey, he was born at Outer Cove and was educated there and at Memorial University. Hickey married Dorothy Grace Wall; the couple had one daughter; SuzAnne Valentina. He worked for the Department of Social Services, was a sales representative for British American Oil and then was the owner of a groceteria. He also worked at the United States Air Force base at Fort Pepperrell. Hickey served on the town council for Placentia. In 1963 he founded and served as first president of the Placentia Regatta.

Hickey was elected to the Newfoundland House of Assembly in 1966 and was reelected in 1971, 1972, 1975, 1979 and 1982. He served in the provincial cabinet as Minister of Social Services, as Minister of Provincial Affairs, as Minister of Transportation and Communications, as Minister of Tourism, as Minister of Rehabilitation and Recreation and as Minister of Housing.

Hickey was the founder of the Newfoundland and Labrador First Party, which was established in November 2004. and led the party from 2004 until 2008, when he was succeeded as party leader by Wayne Bennett. Hickey ran unsuccessfully for the party in a Placentia—St. Mary's by-election held in 2006, winning only 31 votes.

Hickey died on 2 January 2020. He was 86 years old.
