= Newfoundland and Labrador Route 21 =

Highway in the Canadian province of Newfoundland and Labrador

Route 21
- Bauline Line

Route information
- Maintained by Newfoundland and Labrador Department of Transportation and Infrastructure
- Length: 9.3 km (5.8 mi)

Major junctions
- South end: Route 20 in Torbay
- Pouch Cove Line (Route 20-19) in Bauline
- North end: Bauline

Location
- Country: Canada
- Province: Newfoundland and Labrador

Highway system
- Highways in Newfoundland and Labrador
| ← Route 20 | → Route 30 |

Route 21, also known as Bauline Line, is a 9.3-kilometre-long (5.8 mi) north-south highway on the Avalon Peninsula of Newfoundland in the Canadian province of Newfoundland and Labrador. It serves to connect the towns of Torbay and Bauline.

The naming of transit routes leading to a specific town or village sometime will include the name of the town in which it terminates. The route is often in a straight line towards the community/town from a highway or main access road and have the generic name ‘line’ attached to it. Such is the case for Bauline Line. There are other such roads (lines) which exist in Newfoundland and Labrador as in ‘The Witless Bay Line’, ‘The Hodgewater Line’, ‘Horse Cove Line’ and ‘The Salmonier Line’.

"Line" is a term also used in inner city or community roads and are based upon family names as in ‘The Ruby Line’, ‘Doolings Line’, ‘Higgins Line’, ‘Roach’s Line’, ‘Hurley’s Line’, ‘Carey’s Line’, and ‘Quigley’s Line’.

== Route description ==
Route 21 begins in Torbay at an intersection with Route 20 (Torbay Bypass) just west of downtown. It heads west past some parks, homes, and businesses for a few kilometres before leaving Torbay and continuing northwest through rural wooded areas. The highway now enters Bauline and passes by some businesses before having an intersection with Pouch Cove Line. Route 21 now winds its way down some hills into downtown, where it comes to an end at the Atlantic coast at Bauline’s harbour.

== History ==
Prior to the completion of Route 20’s Torbay Bypass in 2011, Route 21 continued southeast 1.8 kilometres (1.1 mi) along Bauline Line to end at Torbay Road (Former Route 20) in downtown Torbay.

== Major intersections ==
| Location | km | mi | Destinations | Notes |
|---|---|---|---|---|
| Torbay | 0.0 | 0.0 | Route 20 (Torbay Bypass) – Pouch Cove, St. John's | Southern terminus; former Route 21 (Bauline Line) continues east into downtown |
| Bauline | 7.3 | 4.5 | Pouch Cove Line (Route 20-19) - Pouch Cove | |
| Bauline | 9.3 | 5.8 | Dead End at Bauline's Harbour | Northern terminus |
1.000 mi = 1.609 km; 1.000 km = 0.621 mi
