= Newfoundland and Labrador Route 30 =

Highway in Newfoundland and Labrador, Canada

Route 30
- Logy Bay Road; Lower Road; Marine Drive; Middle Cove Road

Route information
- Maintained by Newfoundland and Labrador Department of Transportation and Infrastructure
- Length: 12.0 km (7.5 mi)

Major junctions
- South end: Route 20 / Kenna’s Hill in St. John's
- The Parkway (Macdonald Drive) in St. John's; Route 1 (TCH) in St. John's
- North end: Torbay Road To Route 20 at Torbay

Location
- Country: Canada
- Province: Newfoundland and Labrador

Highway system
- Highways in Newfoundland and Labrador
← Route 21	→ Route 40

Route 30 is a 12.0-kilometre-long (7.5 mi) north-south provincial highway in Newfoundland and Labrador, extending from St. John's through Logy Bay-Middle Cove-Outer Cove to Torbay, all along the Avalon Peninsula of Newfoundland.

== Route description ==
The highway's southern terminus is in St. John's, where it and Route 20 (Torbay Road) both branch off from Kenna's Hill north of the downtown core. Under the street name Logy Bay Road, the highway heads northeasterly for approximately 6.2 kilometres to the community of Logy Bay, where the highway transfers onto Lower Road and continues for two kilometres to Outer Cove. At Outer Cove it turns westerly as Marine Drive, continuing for 1.8 kilometres until Marine Drive meets Middle Cove Road near Middle Cove; it then follows Middle Cove Road for 1.9 kilometres until its northern terminus at Torbay Road, approximately half a kilometre north of Route 20's diversion from Torbay Road onto the Torbay Bypass.

== Major intersections ==
Location	km	mi	Destinations	Notes
St. John's	0.0	0.0	Route 20 north (Torbay Road) – Torbay; Kenna's Hill - Downtown	Southern terminus of Route 20 and Route 30; Y-Intersection; road continues south as Kenna's Hill
St. John's	1.5	0.93	The Parkway (Macdonald Drive) south	Northern terminus of The Parkway
St. John's	3.7– 3.9	2.3– 2.4	Route 1 (TCH) west (Outer Ring Road) – Mount Pearl, Clarenville	Eastern terminus of Route 1 and the Trans-Canada Highway; Exit 50 on Route 1; eastbound exit and westbound entrance on Route 1
Torbay	12.0	7.5	Torbay Road To Route 20 – St. John's, Pouch Cove	Former Route 20; Northern terminus
1.000 mi = 1.609 km; 1.000 km = 0.621 mi: Incomplete access

== See also ==
- List of Newfoundland and Labrador highways
- List of highways numbered 30
