= Kevin Parsons Sr. =

Canadian politician

MHA for Cape St. Francis
- In office 1986–1993
- Preceded by: Tom Hickey
- Succeeded by: Jack Byrne

Minister of Sports, Recreation, And Youth
- In office March 27, 1989 – May 5, 1989
- Preceded by: Office Established
- Succeeded by: Office Abolished

Personal details
- Born: May 9, 1930 Flatrock, Dominion of Newfoundland
- Died: March 10, 2013 (aged 82) St. John's, Newfoundland and Labrador
- Party: Progressive Conservative Party of Newfoundland and Labrador
- Children: Kevin Parsons, Jr., 4 others
- Occupation: fisherman, police officer, firefighter

Kevin Richard Parsons (May 9, 1930 – March 10, 2013) was a Canadian politician. He represented the electoral district of Cape St. Francis in the Newfoundland and Labrador House of Assembly from 1986 to 1993. He is a member of the Progressive Conservative Party of Newfoundland and Labrador. He was born at Flatrock, Newfoundland. He was also a former mayor of his hometown.
