= Lady of the Lake (brig) =

Brig that sank in 1833

Coordinates: 46°50′N 47°10′W

History
- Name: Lady of the Lake
- Fate: Wrecked off Cape St. Francis on 11 May 1833.

General characteristics
- Type: Brig

Lady of the Lake was an Aberdeen-built brig that sank off the coast of Newfoundland in May 1833, with the loss of up to 265 passengers and crew. Only fifteen passengers and crew survived.

== Sinking ==
The vessel had departed from Belfast on 8 April 1833, bound for Quebec. At 8:00 a.m. on 11 May 1833, Lady of the Lake was struck by ice on the starboard bow and began to sink, about 400 kilometres (250 miles) east of Cape St. Francis, Newfoundland. One of the lifeboats capsized shortly after lowering, with the loss of an estimated 80 individuals. Lady of the Lake continued to sink with about 30 passengers clinging to the maintop mast. The survivors spent 75 hours in an open boat before being rescued by the ship Amazon.

Sources differ as to the final death toll, with estimates ranging from 170 to 265.

== Voyages from 1829–1833 ==
Departure Date	Port of Departure	Arrival Date	Port of Arrival	Master	Remarks	Consigned to
Sept 2, 1829	Dublin	22 October 1829	Quebec	Stephens	In Ballast	H. Lemesurier & Co
17 November 1829	Quebec	???	Galway	Stephens		H. Lemesurier & Co
25 August 1830	Greenock	13 October 1830	Quebec	Glederie	In Ballast	Rodger Dean & Co.
16 November 1830	Quebec	???	Greenock	Glederie		Rodger Dean & Co
2 April 1832	Aberdeen, Scotland	2 June 1832	Quebec	Grant	Transport 15 Settlers	G.H. Parke
27 August 1832	Belfast, Ireland	19 October 1832	Quebec	Patterson	At Grosse Isle on 16 October?	G.H. Parke
