= Kevin Parsons (politician) =

Canadian politician (1961–2024)

Member of the Newfoundland and Labrador House of Assembly for Cape St. Francis
- In office 12 September 2008 – 15 January 2021
- Preceded by: Jack Byrne
- Succeeded by: Joedy Wall

Mayor of Flatrock, NL
- In office 2005–2008

Personal details
- Born: November 25, 1961 Flatrock, Newfoundland and Labrador, Canada
- Died: 15 August 2024 (aged 62)
- Party: Progressive Conservative
- Children: Nicole Parsons; David Parsons
- Education: College of the North Atlantic
- Profession: Technician

Kevin Parsons Jr. (November 25, 1961 – 15 August 2024) was a Canadian politician from Newfoundland and Labrador. He served as the Caucus Chair for the Progressive Conservative Party. Parsons had represented the electoral district of Cape St. Francis in the Newfoundland and Labrador House of Assembly since 2008. He had previously served as the Parliamentary Secretary to the Minister of Business, Tourism, Culture and Rural Development. Prior to entering provincial politics, Parsons was the Mayor of Flatrock. Parsons died on 15 August 2024.

== Provincial politics ==
A member of the Progressive Conservative Party, Parsons was elected in a by-election on August 27, 2008, following the death of longtime Newfoundland and Labrador House of Assembly and former cabinet minister Jack Byrne. His father Kevin Sr. represented the district from 1986 and 1993. Parsons was re-elected in the 2011 and 2015 provincial elections. He was re-elected again in the 2019 provincial election. In October 2020, Parsons announced he would not seek re-election in the 2021 provincial election.

== Electoral record ==
2019 Newfoundland and Labrador general election
Party	Candidate	Votes	%	±%
Progressive Conservative	Kevin Parsons	4,539	72.2	
Liberal	Michael Duffy	1,115	17.7	
New Democratic	Peter Beck	396	6.3	
NL Alliance	Ryan Lane	233	3.7	
Total valid votes				
Total rejected ballots				
Turnout				
Eligible voters				

2015 Newfoundland and Labrador general election
Party	Candidate	Votes	%	±%
Progressive Conservative	Kevin Parsons	4,086	66.34	+6.96
Liberal	Geoff Gallant	1,613	26.19	+23.26
New Democratic	Mark Gruchy	460	7.47	-30.22
Total valid votes		6,159	100.00	

2011 Newfoundland and Labrador general election
Party	Candidate	Votes	%	±%
Progressive Conservative	Kevin Parsons	4,132	59.38	-9.59
New Democratic	Geoff Gallant	2,623	37.69	+14.29
Liberal	Joy Buckle	204	2.93	-4.70
Total valid votes		6,959	99.47	

Newfoundland and Labrador provincial by-election, August 27, 2008
Party	Candidate	Votes	%	±%
Progressive Conservative	Kevin Parsons	2,865	68.97	-8.86
New Democratic	Kathleen Connors	972	23.40	+12.78
Liberal	Tonia Power-Mercer	317	7.63	-3.91
Total valid votes		4,154		
