= Thomas Knapton =

English mariner and rapist

- Born: c. 1816; United Kingdom
- Died: 26 July 1833 (aged 17); Lincoln Castle, England, United Kingdom
- Cause of death: Execution by hanging
- Conviction: Rape
- Penalty: Death

Thomas Knapton (c. 1816 – 26 July 1833) was an English mariner who was executed after being convicted of rape. He was convicted of raping 18-year-old Frances Elstone on 30 June 1833 and was sentenced to death. He was hanged at Lincoln Castle at the age of 17.

According to a contemporary newspaper account of his crime:

[Elstone], a decent, modest young woman, 18 years of age, stated that she was at service at a farmhouse about four miles from her parents, and obtained leave to go and see them on the Sunday in question. Site prisoner on the road he put his round her, and made her an insulting propond, which she indignantly rejected. He then used force; she struggled and screamed, and struck him a blow on the nose, which made it bleed profusely. He succeeded in throwing her down with great violence. She told him there were people encamped on the road-side, who would hear her cries; he said they would not. She told him her father was coming to meet her; he said he did not care. She told him there were people coming; he looked each way and said there was no one. She struggled as well as she could, and prayed to God to help her. After a desperate struggle of half an hour her strength entirely failed her, and he effected his purpose. He then went off. She made the best of her way home, and told the manner in which she had been used; her bonnet was crushed to pieces, and the upper part of her person covered with blood from the prisoner's nose. Her father borrowed a horse, and rode in pursuit of the prisoner, but missed him; but from information he received, the prisoner was discovered concealed in an out-house. She had been ill ever since, and was too weak to stand in the witness box. The Jury found the prisoner guilty, but recommended him to mercy, on account of his youth. Mr. Justice Taunton said he could not attend to that recommendation, and passed sentence death upon the prisoner, which he heard unmoved. – The Westmorland Gazette, 3 August 1833
