= Torbay, Newfoundland and Labrador =

Torbay
- Town
- Town of Torbay
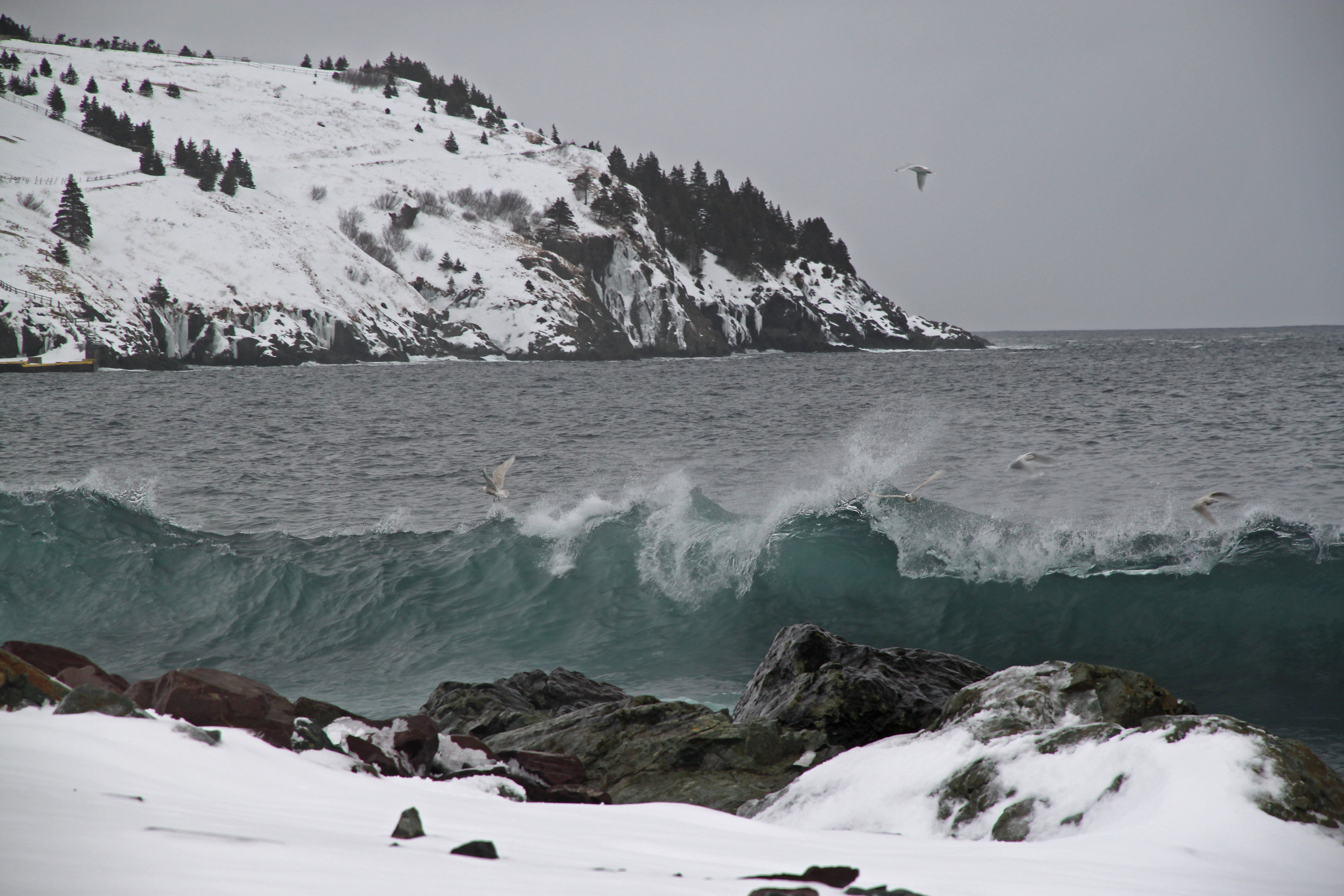

- Seal
- Motto: "Salus et Felicitas" (Latin) "Health and Happiness"
- Location of Torbay Torbay (Newfoundland and Labrador)
- Coordinates: 47°39′33″N 52°45′11″W display=inline,title
- Country: Canada
- Province: Newfoundland and Labrador

Government
  - Mayor: Craig Scott
  - MHA: Joedy Wall (PC)
  - MP: Joanne Thompson (LIB)

Area
  - Land: 34.89 km^{2} (13.47 sq mi)

Population (2021)
  - Total: 7,852
  - Density: 212.1/km^{2} (549/sq mi)
- Time zone: UTC−03:30 (NST)
  - Summer (DST): UTC−02:30 (NDT)
- Postal code: A1K
- Area code: 709
- Highways: Route 20; Route 21; Route 30
- Website: torbay.ca

Torbay is a town located on the eastern side of the Avalon Peninsula in Newfoundland and Labrador, Canada.

The town is located 12 km (7.5 mi) north of the capital city of St. John's and is part of the St. John's metropolitan area. Due to Torbay's close proximity to St. John's, the town's population is quickly growing. According to the 2021 census the population was 7,852, up from 7,397 in 2011.

== History ==
The name Torbay comes from Torbay, Devon, England and was first mapped in 1615 by John Mason. It comes from the old Anglo-Saxon "Tor" which means "a rocky hill". Both places are geographically similar with wide-open bays that face in a northeasterly direction. An extract from Bishop Feild's journal states, "indeed there seems to be a little colony of Devon folk in Torbay." John Nutt, the pirate, settled here with his family from Devon.

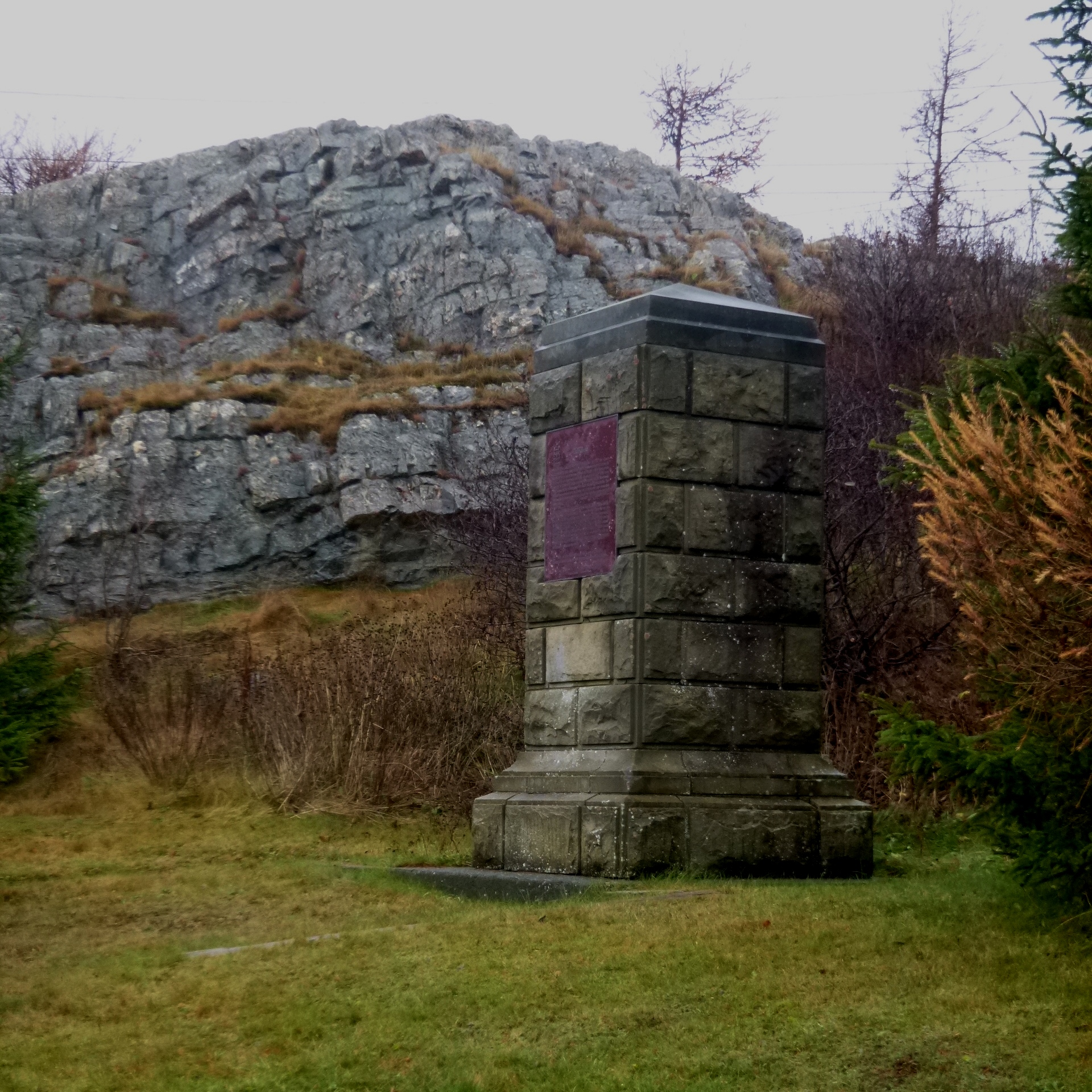
Monument to the landing of Colonel William Amherst in 1762

The community of Torbay experienced three French campaigns, the first of which occurred in December 1696. These invasions contributed to the eventual construction of the Torbay Battery in 1781, which was manned by 25 troops from the 71st Regiment and Royal Artillery. The ordnance was eventually withdrawn in 1795.

The census of 1677 indicated the Cole and Corum families as residing in "Tarr-Bay" Newfoundland. The following year the Field Family joined them. By 1794 the population of Torbay included many of the surnames now associated with Torbay and totalled 108 English settlers and 99 Irish settlers. The Way Office, a mail handling facility used where there was not enough business to warrant a full post office, was established in 1891.

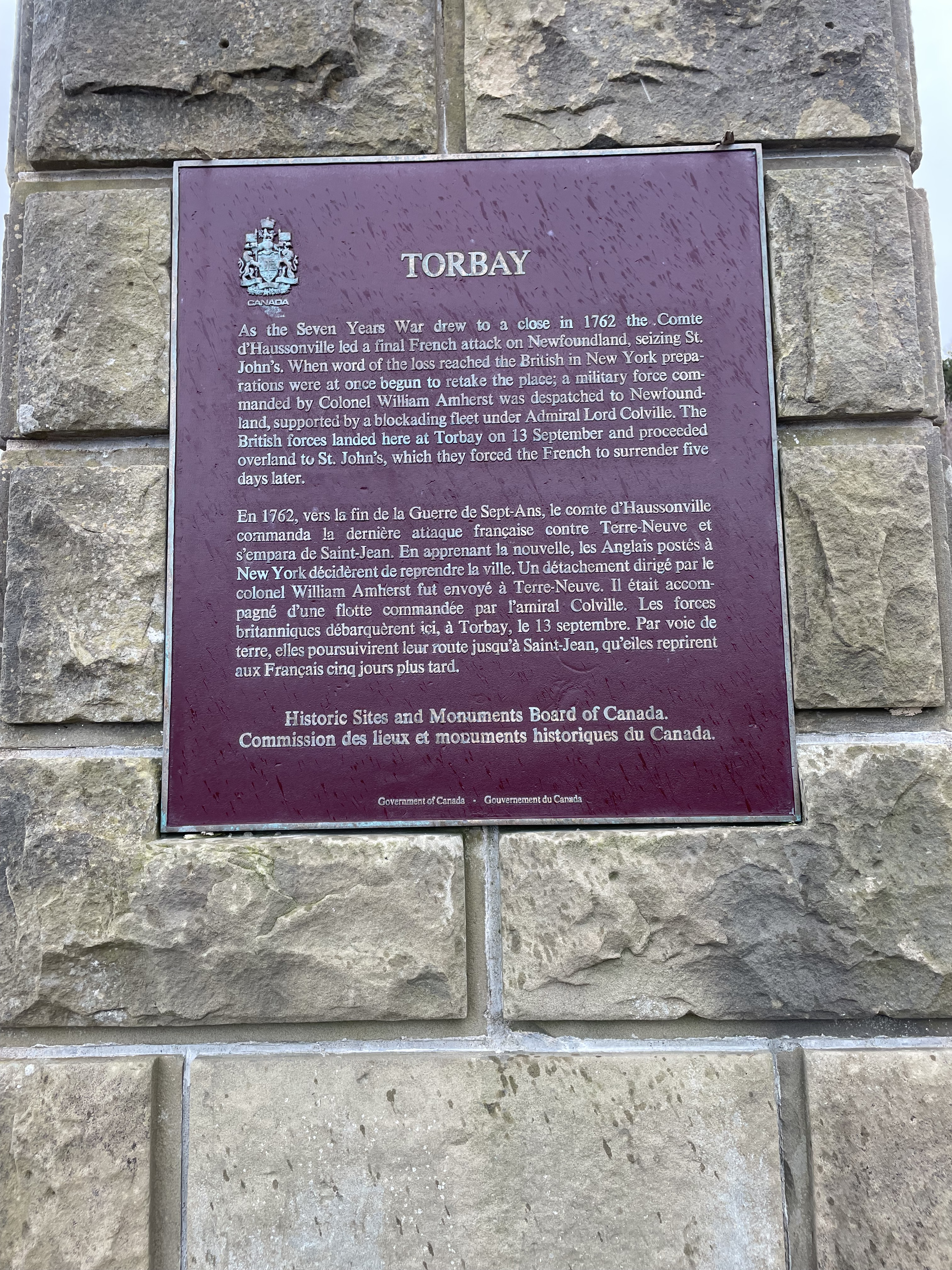
Plaque commemorating Amherst's landing in Torbay on September 13, 1762

The early history of the community was further highlighted by the landing of Colonel William Amherst and his troops in 1762 on their way to re-capturing the capital city of St. John's from the French. This event was officially recognized in 1978 when the first mayor of Torbay, William Manning, unveiled a stone monument and plaque at the present day Veterans Memorial Park.

== Demographics ==
In the 2021 Census of Population conducted by Statistics Canada, Torbay had a population of 7,852 living in 2,985 of its 3,182 total private dwellings, a change of −0.6% from its 2016 population of 7,899. With a land area of 34.89 km^{2} (13.47 sq mi), it had a population density of 225.1/km^{2} (582.9/sq mi) in 2021.

Year	Population	% change
1991	4,707	N/A
1996	5,230	▲11.1
2001	5,474	▲4.7
2006	6,281	▲14.7
2011	7,397	▲17.8%
2016	7,899	▲6.8%

== Geography ==
=== Climate ===
Climate is from St. John's International Airport (approximately 4.5 km (2.8 mi) south southwest of Torbay).

Climate data for St. John's (St. John's International Airport) WMO ID: 71801; coordinates 47°37′20″N 52°44′34″W; elevation: 140.5 m (461 ft); 1991–2020 normals, extremes 1874–present (Note: Based on station coordinates provided by Environment and Climate Change Canada, climate data was collected in the area of downtown St. John's from 1874 to 1956, and at St. John's Airport from 1942 to the present day.)
Month	Jan	Feb	Mar	Apr	May	Jun	Jul	Aug	Sep	Oct	Nov	Dec	Year
Record high humidex	19.2	17.3	17.2	26.1	30.3	34.8	38.7	37.7	35.8	30.4	24.1	22.0	38.7
Record high °C (°F)	15.7 (60.3)	16.0 (60.8)	19.4 (66.9)	24.1 (75.4)	27.6 (81.7)	30.6 (87.1)	32.2 (90.0)	33.9 (93.0)	29.5 (85.1)	24.6 (76.3)	19.4 (66.9)	17.9 (64.2)	33.9 (93.0)
Mean maximum °C (°F)	9.2 (48.6)	8.1 (46.6)	10.0 (50.0)	15.1 (59.2)	21.1 (70.0)	24.7 (76.5)	27.5 (81.5)	27.3 (81.1)	24.6 (76.3)	20.1 (68.2)	16.2 (61.2)	12.2 (54.0)	28.3 (82.9)
Mean daily maximum °C (°F)	−0.7 (30.7)	−1.0 (30.2)	1.2 (34.2)	5.6 (42.1)	11.0 (51.8)	15.7 (60.3)	20.9 (69.6)	20.8 (69.4)	17.0 (62.6)	11.2 (52.2)	6.7 (44.1)	2.1 (35.8)	9.2 (48.6)
Daily mean °C (°F)	−4.2 (24.4)	−4.7 (23.5)	−2.2 (28.0)	1.8 (35.2)	6.3 (43.3)	10.8 (51.4)	16.0 (60.8)	16.5 (61.7)	12.8 (55.0)	7.8 (46.0)	3.4 (38.1)	−1.0 (30.2)	5.3 (41.5)
Mean daily minimum °C (°F)	−7.8 (18.0)	−8.4 (16.9)	−5.7 (21.7)	−1.9 (28.6)	1.6 (34.9)	5.9 (42.6)	11.2 (52.2)	12.1 (53.8)	8.5 (47.3)	4.3 (39.7)	0.0 (32.0)	−4.1 (24.6)	1.3 (34.4)
Mean minimum °C (°F)	−15.6 (3.9)	−16.0 (3.2)	−13.3 (8.1)	−7.4 (18.7)	−3.0 (26.6)	0.3 (32.5)	5.3 (41.5)	6.1 (43.0)	2.4 (36.3)	−1.4 (29.5)	−6.7 (19.9)	−11.8 (10.8)	−16.8 (1.8)
Record low °C (°F)	−28.3 (−18.9)	−29.4 (−20.9)	−25.6 (−14.1)	−18.3 (−0.9)	−6.7 (19.9)	−3.3 (26.1)	−1.1 (30.0)	0.5 (32.9)	−1.7 (28.9)	−5.6 (21.9)	−14.4 (6.1)	−20.0 (−4.0)	−29.4 (−20.9)
Record low wind chill	−35.7	−40.3	−40.3	−21.4	−14.2	−8.4	−3.4	0.0	−4.4	−11.8	−24.6	−34.3	−40.3
Average precipitation mm (inches)	153.0 (6.02)	122.8 (4.83)	140.1 (5.52)	121.6 (4.79)	98.1 (3.86)	88.2 (3.47)	100.1 (3.94)	99.8 (3.93)	125.8 (4.95)	158.1 (6.22)	157.4 (6.20)	173.9 (6.85)	1,538.9 (60.58)
Average rainfall mm (inches)	67.7 (2.67)	55.3 (2.18)	78.9 (3.11)	91.9 (3.62)	93.6 (3.69)	88.1 (3.47)	100.1 (3.94)	99.8 (3.93)	125.8 (4.95)	155.7 (6.13)	132.4 (5.21)	107.7 (4.24)	1,197 (47.13)
Average snowfall cm (inches)	95.4 (37.6)	77.1 (30.4)	62.0 (24.4)	29.5 (11.6)	4.5 (1.8)	0.0 (0.0)	0.0 (0.0)	0.0 (0.0)	0.0 (0.0)	2.3 (0.9)	22.3 (8.8)	70.3 (27.7)	363.4 (143.1)
Average precipitation days (≥ 0.2 mm)	21.7	18.8	19.0	17.2	16.9	14.6	13.5	14.1	15.3	18.1	19.0	21.5	209.6
Average rainy days (≥ 0.2 mm)	9.7	8.4	10.9	13.6	16.3	14.6	13.5	14.1	15.3	17.8	15.6	12.7	162.3
Average snowy days (≥ 0.2 cm)	18.4	15.2	13.3	7.5	2.0	0.04	0.0	0.0	0.04	0.96	6.6	14.0	78.1
Average relative humidity (%) (at 1500 LST)	80.8	77.4	76.2	74.5	71.1	71.3	70.4	71.6	73.0	77.0	79.6	82.6	75.4
Average dew point °C (°F)	−6.5 (20.3)	−7.1 (19.2)	−5.1 (22.8)	−1.5 (29.3)	2.4 (36.3)	7.1 (44.8)	12.2 (54.0)	12.9 (55.2)	9.8 (49.6)	5.1 (41.2)	0.8 (33.4)	−3.4 (25.9)	2.3 (36.1)
Mean monthly sunshine hours	65.5	90.2	107.4	140.4	176.3	198.9	216.7	206.6	170.5	122.1	76.3	62.4	1,633.2
Mean daily sunshine hours	8.7	10.2	11.2	13.6	15.0	15.5	14.9	14.2	12.9	10.3	10.1	8.5	15.5
Percentage possible sunshine	23.7	31.1	29.2	34.3	37.6	41.7	44.9	46.7	45.1	36.2	27.2	23.7	35.1
Average ultraviolet index	1	2	3	5	6	7	7	7	5	3	1	1	4
Source 1: Environment and Climate Change Canada (February minimum) (August maximum) (December maximum) (sunshine)
Source 2: Weather Atlas (dew point, mean maximum, and mean minimum)

== Economy ==
The town of Torbay is a bedroom community, with most of the workforce commuting to the nearby cities of St. John's and Mount Pearl. No public transport links St. John's to its northern suburbs and exurbs, and all such commutes are done by car only. The town's economy is driven mostly by service industries that serve the residents such as grocery stores, convenience stores, doctors offices, hair salons, real-estate offices and restaurants among others.

With population growth in the town in recent years the housing market has become a significant part of the local economy. Torbay has become the most expensive housing market in the province with average home prices surpassing $375,000. Between 2009 and 2010 the town also saw the largest appreciation in housing prices in the St. John's CMA, with housing prices rising 32%.

== Transportation ==
=== Air ===
The town is serviced by St. John's International Airport, which was formally the Torbay Airport. Airlines include Air Canada, Air Canada Express, Air Labrador, Air Saint-Pierre, Air Transat, Porter Airlines, Provincial Airlines, Sunwing Airlines, WestJet and WestJet Encore. The airport offers services across Canada and the United Kingdom and Ireland, to the United States, Saint-Pierre and the Caribbean.

=== Road ===
==== Torbay Bypass ====
Prior to 2011, the only major route into Torbay was Torbay Road (route 20). 2011 saw the opening of the Torbay Bypass, a $22.7 million project that required three years to complete. The south end of the bypass begins at a traffic light-controlled T-intersection with Torbay Road, North of the Stavanger Drive shopping area, and runs 7.7 km north with access via traffic lights to Indian Meal Line, and Bauline Line, before it meets Torbay Road at its northern terminus. This project also saw upgrades to portions of Torbay Road, and includes multiple grade-separated crossings.

== Government ==
=== Municipal ===
The town council of Torbay is composed of a mayor, deputy mayor and five councillors (at large). The mayor and councillors are elected during the municipal election, which is held every four years on the last Tuesday in September. Traditionally the councillor with the highest numbers of votes is selected and confirmed as deputy mayor during the first official meeting of the new council, the mayor is elected by separate ballot. In Newfoundland and Labrador, municipal elections are nonpartisan.

Current Torbay Town Council of the 2021–2025 term is represented by acclaimed Mayor Craig Scott, Deputy Mayor Mary Thorne-Gosse and five Councillors Ralph Tapper, Rhonda Manning, Trina Appleby, Ward Gosse, Tony Pollard.

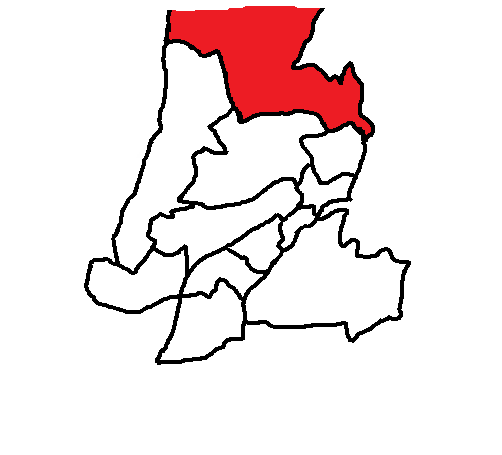
Cape St. Francis map

=== Provincial ===
Torbay is a part of the provincial electoral district of Cape St. Francis, the district is a tory stronghold and is currently represented by Progressive Conservative (PC) MHA Joedy Wall.

=== Federal ===
The town is represented in the House of Commons by the federal riding of St. John's East, formally St. John's North. The seat was another tory stronghold and was represented by Conservatives MPs for the majority of time since 1949. The federal riding is now represented by Liberal Party MP Joanne Thompson.

== Sports ==
=== Hockey ===
The town is home to the Northeast Eagles, which offers novice, atom, peewee and bantam hockey for youths. The town also has a senior hockey team for adults, both teams play at the Jack Byrne Arena. The arena is Torbay's first hockey arena which opened in October 2008, under the name North East Avalon Arena. In March 2009 the arena was officially opened by Premier Danny Williams and was renamed the Jack Byrne Arena after the former MHA who had died in early 2008.

=== Soccer ===
The Torbay soccer association runs soccer games throughout the summer for youths.

=== Softball ===
The town offers three adult softball leagues along with a minor softball house league. There is a ladies recreational league, an over 18 men's league and the long running Avalon East Slo-Pitch over 35 gentlemen's league.

== Education ==
The town is home to Holy Trinity Elementary which offers kindergarten to grade 4 education, Juniper Ridge Intermediate which offers grades 5 to 8 and Holy Trinity High which offers education from grades 9 to 12. English and French immersion education is offered at both schools. A new elementary school was constructed to replace the former Holy Trinity Elementary; the school opened in September 2010. The School is still called Holy Trinity Elementary School. Juniper Ridge Intermediate was opened in September 2018 with attending students from the surrounding area.

== See also ==
- List of municipalities in Newfoundland and Labrador
- List of people from Newfoundland and Labrador
- List of communities in Newfoundland and Labrador
