= Joedy Wall =

Canadian politician

The Honourable Joedy Wall ECNL MHA
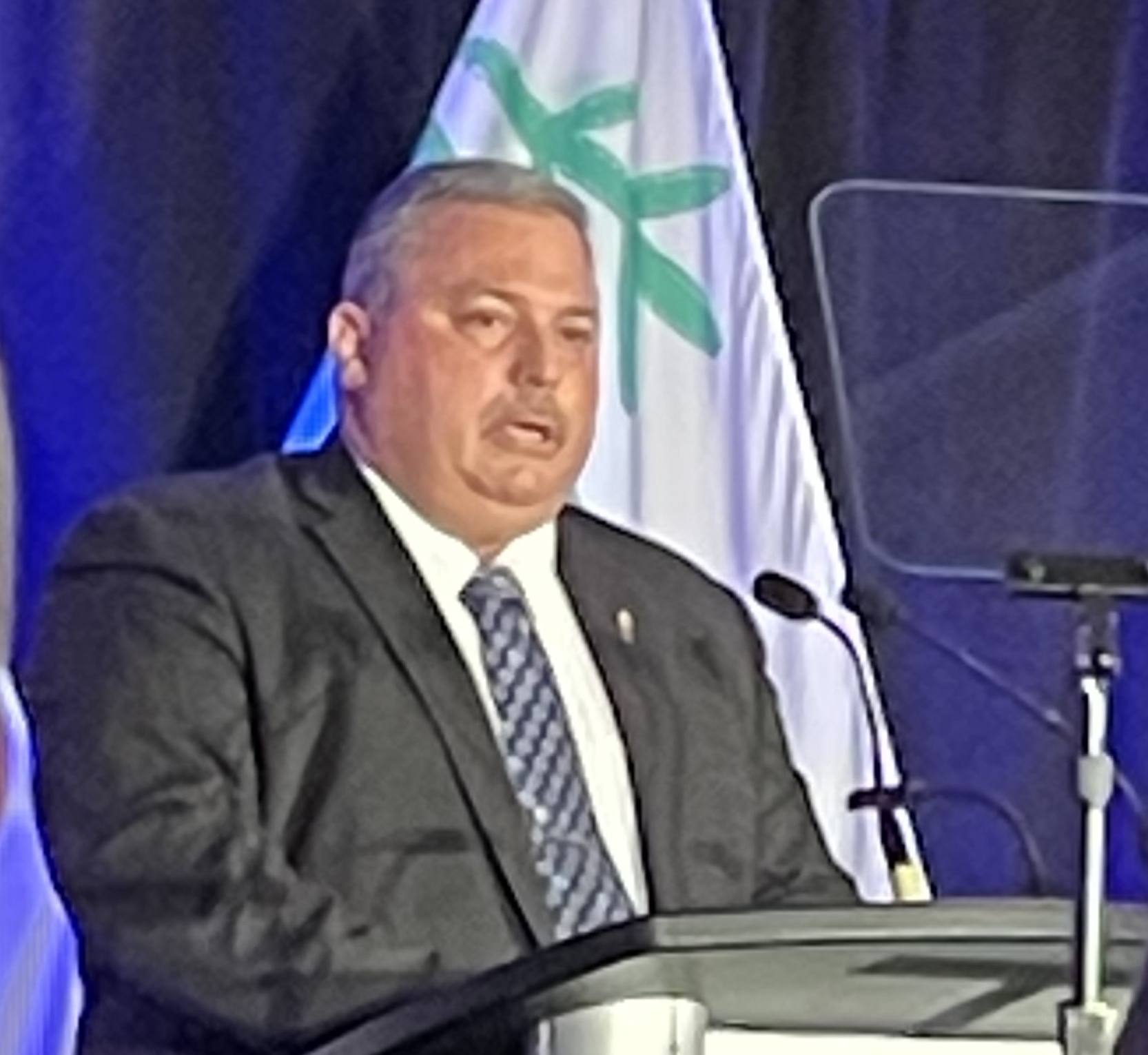
- Wall in 2026

Member of the Newfoundland and Labrador House of Assembly for Cape St. Francis
- Incumbent
- Assumed office March 27, 2021
- Preceded by: Kevin Parsons

Minister of Social Supports and Well Being
- In office October 29, 2025 – August 20, 2026
- Preceded by: Bernard Davis
- Succeeded by: Chris Tibbs

Deputy Government House Leader
- In office October 29, 2025 – August 20, 2026
- Preceded by: John Haggie
- Succeeded by: Barry Petten

Minister of Health and Community Services
- Incumbent
- Assumed office August 20, 2026
- Preceded by: Lela Evans

Minister of Housing
- In office October 29, 2025 – August 20, 2026
- Preceded by: Bernard Davis
- Succeeded by: Chris Tibbs

Minister of Mental Health and Addictions
- Incumbent
- Assumed office August 20, 2026
- Preceded by: Lela Evans

Personal details
- Party: Progressive Conservative

Joedy Wall is a Canadian politician, who was elected to the Newfoundland and Labrador House of Assembly in the 2021 provincial election. He represents the electoral district of Cape St. Francis as a member of the Newfoundland and Labrador Progressive Conservative Party.

Prior to his election, Wall was the Mayor of Pouch Cove. Wall unsuccessfully ran in the 2019 federal election as the Conservative candidate in St. John's East.

Wall supported Tony Wakeham in the 2023 provincial PC party leadership race.

Wall was re-elected in the 2025 Newfoundland and Labrador general election.

On October 29, 2025, Wall was appointed Minister of Housing, Minister of Social Supports and Well Being, Minister of Poverty Reduction, Minister Responsible for the Status of Persons with Disabilities, and the Deputy Government House Leader.

On August 20, 2026, a shuffle occurred in the Wakeham ministry, and Wall was appointed to the new roles of Minister of Health and Community Services, Minister of Mental Health and Addictions, and Minister Responsible for Newfoundland and Labrador Health Services.

On September 17, 2026, Wall voted to approve the Churchill Falls Definitive Cooperation and Implementation Agreement (DCIA) in the House of Assembly along with the PC caucus.

== Election results ==
2025 Newfoundland and Labrador general election: Cape St. Francis
Party	Candidate	Votes	%	±%
Progressive Conservative	Joedy Wall	3,388	54.32	-8.19
Liberal	Kara Connors	2,457	39.39	+11.14
New Democratic	Greg Rockwood	392	6.29	-1.78
Total valid votes		6,237		
Total rejected ballots				
Turnout				
Eligible voters				
Progressive Conservative hold		Swing		-9.67

2021 Newfoundland and Labrador general election: Cape St. Francis
Party	Candidate	Votes	%	±%
Progressive Conservative	Joedy Wall	3,476	62.51	-9.74
Liberal	Peter Whittle	1,571	28.25	+10.50
New Democratic	Phyllis Fleming	449	8.07	+1.77
NL Alliance	Ryan Lane	65	1.17	-2.54
Total valid votes		5,561		
Total rejected ballots				
Turnout				
Eligible voters				
Progressive Conservative hold		Swing		-10.12
Source(s) "Officially Nominated Candidates General Election 2021" (PDF). Elections Newfoundland and Labrador. "NL Election 2021 (Unofficial Results)".

2019 Canadian federal election
Party	Candidate	Votes	%	±%	Expenditures
New Democratic	Jack Harris	21,164	46.9%		
Liberal	Nick Whalen	14,961	33.2%		
Conservative	Joedy Wall	8,187	18.1%		
Green	David Peters	818	1.8%		
Total valid votes/Expense limit		45,130	100.0		
Total rejected ballots					
Turnout					
Eligible voters					
Source: Elections Canada
