= Bauline =

- Town
- Location of Bauline in Newfoundland
- Coordinates: 47°42′N 52°49′W
- Country: Canada
- Province: Newfoundland and Labrador

Government
  - Mayor: Christopher Dredge

Area
  - Land: 15.94 km^{2} (6.15 sq mi)

Population (2021)
  - Total: 412
  - Density: 28.3/km^{2} (73/sq mi)
- Time zone: UTC-3:30 (Newfoundland Time)
  - Summer (DST): UTC-2:30 (Newfoundland Daylight)
- Area code: 709
- Highways: Route 21
- Website: townofbauline.ca

Bauline (/bəˈliːn/ bə-LEEN) is a small town in the Canadian province of Newfoundland and Labrador, located on the Avalon Peninsula north of St. John's. As of the 2021 census, it had a population of 412, making it the smallest incorporated community in the St. John's metropolitan area.

== History ==
As described in a 1956 article in Newfoundland Quarterly, “Near the S.E. point of Conception Bay lies the little fishing village of Bauline, there can be no doubt that the original name was Baleine, after a place in the I. of Sark which it very much resembles." It has also been suggested the name references a connection to the whaling industry. There are reports of vessels from Plymouth and Dartmouth fishing there as early as 1676. Bauline first appears in the Census in 1864 (as Baline) with a population of 42; by 1891 the settlement had grown to 144 people in thirty houses. Since its early days, the community has been almost exclusively Methodist. The congregation was established as a part of the Gower Street Methodist Church circuit, based out of St. John's:

Although the area was visited in 1821 by a Methodist preacher, it was 1834 before the first Methodist Chapel was erected at the community. The actual settlement did not appear on a government census until 1857 when it was reported that the community of Balline had a population of 35. The totally Methodist Wesleyan community had built 9 houses and fishing rooms and some 17 residents were engaged in the fishery.

A Methodist, now United Church of Canada, church was constructed between 1920 and 1921 and is adjacent to two historic Methodist/United Church cemeteries.

== Demographics ==
In the 2021 Census of Population conducted by Statistics Canada, Bauline had a population of 412 living in 161 of its 172 total private dwellings, a change of −8.8% from its 2016 population of 452. With a land area of 16.05 km^{2} (6.20 sq mi), it had a population density of 25.7/km^{2} (66.5/sq mi) in 2021.
