= Logy Bay-Middle Cove-Outer Cove =

- Town
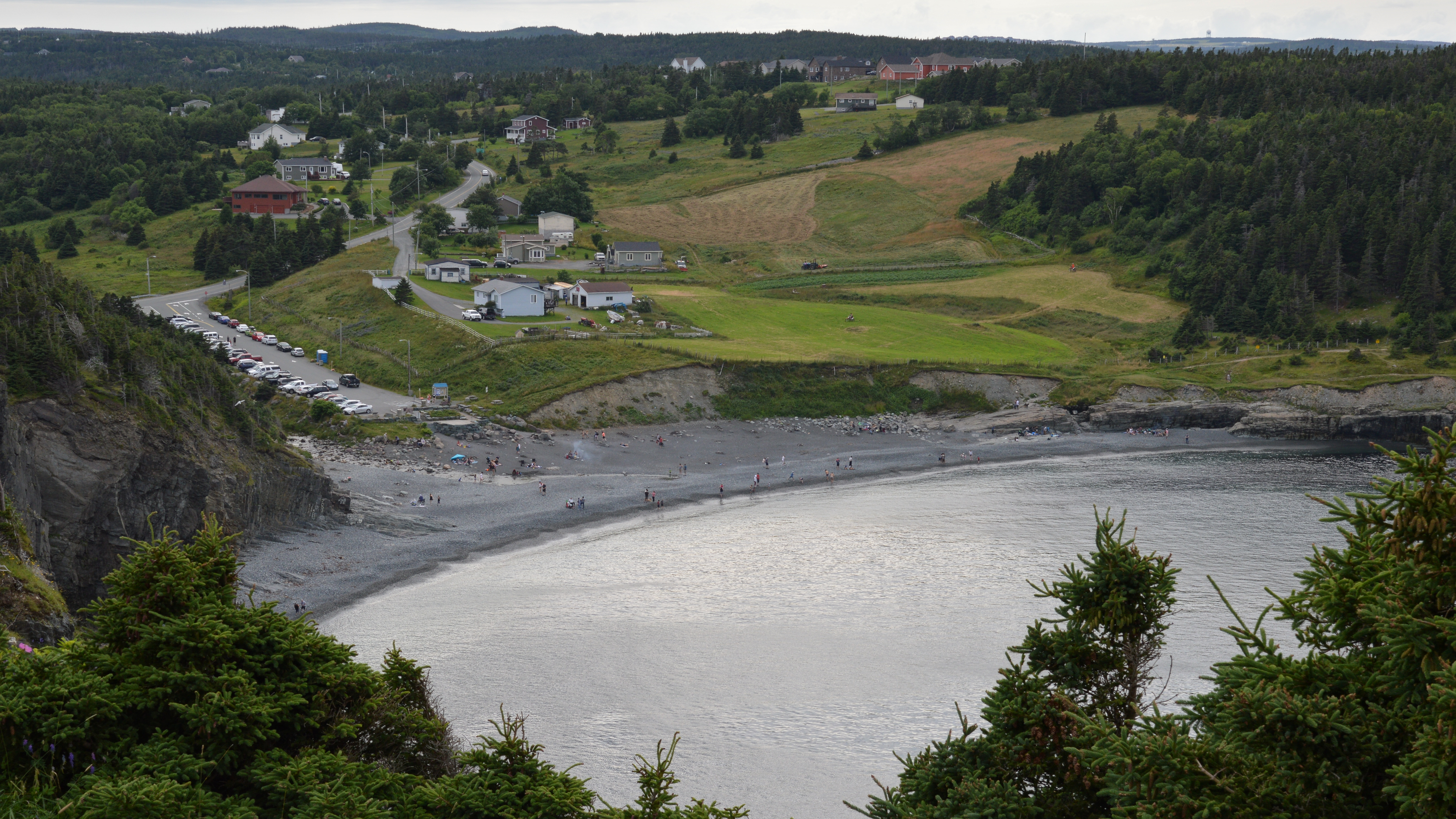
- Middle Cove in 2019

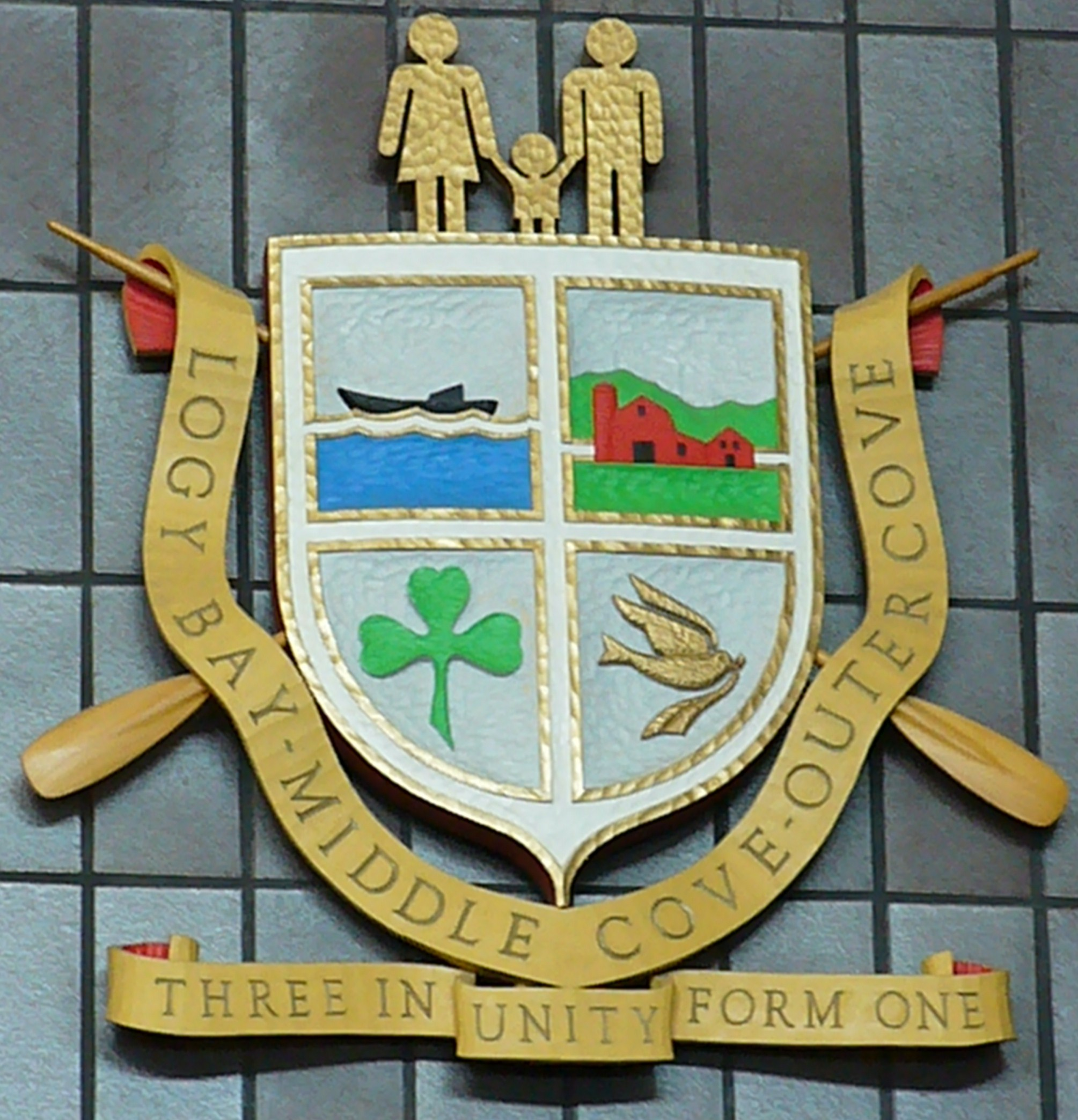
- Seal

- Location in Newfoundland
- Coordinates: 47°38′N 52°41′W
- Country: Canada
- Province: Newfoundland and Labrador
- Settled: 1818

Government
  - Mayor: Shannon Power
  - MHA: Joedy Wall (PC)
  - MP: Joanne Thompson (LIB)

Area
  - Total: 16.98 km^{2} (6.56 sq mi)

Population (2021)
  - Total: 2,364
  - Density: 130.9/km^{2} (339/sq mi)
- Time zone: UTC-3:30 (Newfoundland Time)
  - Summer (DST): UTC-2:30 (Newfoundland Daylight)
- Area code: 709
- Highways: Route 30
- Website: lbmcoc.ca

Logy Bay-Middle Cove-Outer Cove is a town in the Canadian province of Newfoundland and Labrador. It is located within a 10 minutes' drive from downtown St. John's preceding the Town of Torbay on the eastern tip of the Avalon Peninsula.

== History ==
The area encompassing Logy Bay-Middle Cove-Outer Cove is within the boundaries of lands granted to the London and Bristol Company in 1610. In 1627, the company experienced financial difficulties and evidently made lands available to private groups. The name Logy Bay itself first appears on Southwood's map of 1675, however, permanent settlement did not begin until the early 19th century. The earliest record of settlement in Logy Bay is from 1818 when Luke Ryan, a fisherman, sought permission to build a fishing room. The earliest records of settlement in Outer Cove and Middle Cove appear around 1827, but occupation here most likely predated this year.

The early settlers of Logy Bay-Middle Cove-Outer Cove were immigrants predominantly from the Irish counties of Kilkenny, Waterford, Wexford, and Cork. In particular, the town of Inistioge in County Kilkenny was the origin of most of the pioneers of Logy Bay. These early settlers were attracted to the area by the easy access to the excellent fishing grounds that lay just offshore and by the good farmland that dotted the region.

Between 1827 and 1830 there were 9 petitions for land in Logy Bay, 3 in Middle Cove and 30 in Outer Cove. By the 1850s, the Irish had established themselves and proceeded to shape the landscape. Irish heritage is still strong today and can be seen in such things as religion, folkways, music, and dialect.

The area remained unincorporated until it became part of the newly created St. John's Metropolitan Area Board in 1963, which was a municipality encompassing most of the St. John's hinterland. The present town of Logy Bay-Middle Cove-Outer Cove was incorporated as a split-off from the Metro Area Board in 1986.

== Climate ==
Logy Bay-Middle Cover-Outer Cove has a humid continental climate (Dfb) with long, cold, and snowy winters, though not very cold by Canadian standards, and short, mild, and rainy summers with cool nights.

Climate data for Logy Bay-Middle Cove-Outer Cove
Month	Jan	Feb	Mar	Apr	May	Jun	Jul	Aug	Sep	Oct	Nov	Dec	Year
Record high °C (°F)	16.0 (60.8)	16.0 (60.8)	15.0 (59.0)	24.0 (75.2)	26.7 (80.1)	30.0 (86.0)	30.0 (86.0)	31.0 (87.8)	30.0 (86.0)	24.0 (75.2)	25.0 (77.0)	15.0 (59.0)	31.0 (87.8)
Mean daily maximum °C (°F)	0.3 (32.5)	0.0 (32.0)	2.1 (35.8)	6.0 (42.8)	11.0 (51.8)	15.7 (60.3)	20.4 (68.7)	20.7 (69.3)	16.9 (62.4)	11.4 (52.5)	7.0 (44.6)	2.6 (36.7)	9.5 (49.1)
Daily mean °C (°F)	−3.6 (25.5)	−4.0 (24.8)	−1.5 (29.3)	2.4 (36.3)	6.6 (43.9)	10.8 (51.4)	15.6 (60.1)	16.3 (61.3)	12.8 (55.0)	7.9 (46.2)	3.7 (38.7)	−0.9 (30.4)	5.5 (41.9)
Mean daily minimum °C (°F)	−7.4 (18.7)	−8.0 (17.6)	−5.1 (22.8)	−1.3 (29.7)	2.2 (36.0)	6.0 (42.8)	10.7 (51.3)	11.9 (53.4)	8.6 (47.5)	4.3 (39.7)	0.3 (32.5)	−4.3 (24.3)	1.5 (34.7)
Record low °C (°F)	−24.4 (−11.9)	−25.0 (−13.0)	−23.3 (−9.9)	−14.0 (6.8)	−7.0 (19.4)	−3.3 (26.1)	−1.1 (30.0)	3.5 (38.3)	−1.1 (30.0)	−8.0 (17.6)	−13.0 (8.6)	−25.0 (−13.0)	−25.0 (−13.0)
Average precipitation mm (inches)	122.5 (4.82)	113.6 (4.47)	102.9 (4.05)	99.8 (3.93)	83.2 (3.28)	94.7 (3.73)	86.8 (3.42)	94.4 (3.72)	121.1 (4.77)	134.6 (5.30)	126.0 (4.96)	128.7 (5.07)	1,308.1 (51.50)
Average rainfall mm (inches)	72.9 (2.87)	68.6 (2.70)	77.6 (3.06)	89.9 (3.54)	81.4 (3.20)	94.7 (3.73)	86.8 (3.42)	94.4 (3.72)	121.1 (4.77)	134.1 (5.28)	116.7 (4.59)	96.5 (3.80)	1,134.6 (44.67)
Average snowfall cm (inches)	49.6 (19.5)	45.0 (17.7)	25.3 (10.0)	9.9 (3.9)	1.8 (0.7)	0.0 (0.0)	0.0 (0.0)	0.0 (0.0)	0.0 (0.0)	0.4 (0.2)	9.3 (3.7)	32.2 (12.7)	173.6 (68.3)
Source: Environment Canada

== Demographics ==
In the 2021 Census of Population conducted by Statistics Canada, Logy Bay-Middle Cove-Outer Cove had a population of 2,364 living in 887 of its 940 total private dwellings, a change of 6.4% from its 2016 population of 2,221. With a land area of 16.99 km^{2} (6.56 sq mi), it had a population density of 139.1/km^{2} (360.4/sq mi) in 2021.

== Notable residents ==
- Marit Stiles (born 1969), politician
- Rick Mercer, CBC Comedian

== See also ==
- List of cities and towns in Newfoundland and Labrador
