= Flatrock, Newfoundland and Labrador =

Flatrock: Irish: Carraig Leathan; Welsh: Carreg Wastad; Norwegian: Flate steiner
- Town
- View from town wharf

- Seal

- Location of Flatrock in Newfoundland
- Coordinates: 47.7086°N 52.7144°W
- Country: Canada
- Province: Newfoundland and Labrador
- Census division: 1
- Settled: 1762

Government
  - Mayor: Darrin Thorne

Population (2021)
  - Total: 1,722
- Time zone: UTC-3:30 (Newfoundland Time)
  - Summer (DST): UTC-2:30 (Newfoundland Daylight)
- Area code: 709
- Highways: Route 20
- Website: https://townofflatrock.com/

Flatrock is a town in Newfoundland and Labrador. The town had a population of 1,722 in the Canada 2021 Census.

Most of the people in Flatrock are of Irish descent. There are some families who are descended from the few Norwegian settlers who came to Flatrock in the 19th century. Irish heritage is still strong today and can be seen in such things as religion, folkways, music, and dialect/accent.

== Religion and history ==
Flatrock is a Roman Catholic fishing town. The first settlers were Roman Catholic Irish fishermen and also Roman Catholics of French descent. About 95 per cent is Roman Catholic, 2.0% is Anglican Church of Canada, 1% United Church of Canada, or Methodist who attend the United Church in Pouch Cove, and 1% Presbyterian who attend St. Andrew's Presbyterian Church (The Kirk) in St. John's. The population of Protestants in Flatrock are from other communities in Newfoundland, having moved in from recent economic development. There is no evidence of any Protestant family settling in Flatrock other than Norwegian and some English families, who, as evidenced in the town's local history, soon converted to Catholicism. There is only one church, St Michael's Roman Catholic Church. This church as well as St Agnes' Roman Catholic Church in the neighbouring community of Pouch Cove, share the same parish. The Church currently shares a parish priest with Holy Trinity in Torbay, and St. Agnes' in Pouch Cove. There is no Presbytery in Flatrock. However, they do exist in neighboring communities Torbay, Pouch Cove, and Portugal Cove.

=== Our Lady of Lourdes Grotto ===
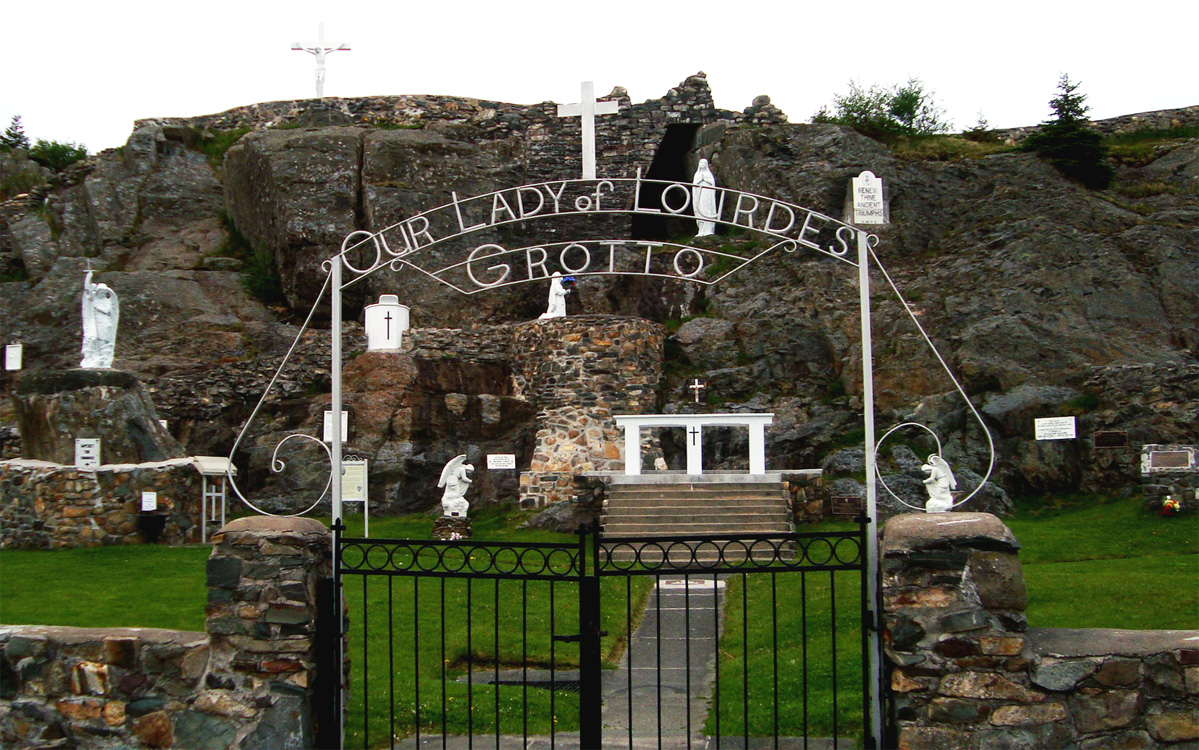
Our Lady of Lourdes Grotto

Our Lady of Lourdes Grotto is a religious shrine located outside of the parish church in Flatrock, founded in 1954 by Fr. William Sullivan after his return to the parish from Lourdes, France. Fr. Sullivan saw many similarities in the terrain in Lourdes to that of his church in Flatrock, and saw that it would be a great opportunity to take advantage of this land. It is to date the largest religious grotto east of Montreal and has been visited by Pope John Paul II on September 12, 1984, where it received a special blessing from him.

The grotto has been designed by Michael Curtis of the nearby city of St. John's. Since its inception, a number of additional monuments have been erected including: a lifesize statue of the crucifix, a statue of St. Michael, a statue of the Blessed Mother that is placed in the cave portion, a statue of St. Bernadette and it contains the fourteen Stations of the Cross which are frequently venerated by parishioners. As well, there as a number of memorial plaques placed throughout the grotto.

The Our Lady of Loudes Grotto has also been voted the "Most Psychedelic Spot" by the St. John's bi-weekly publication The Scope in 2007.

== Confederation ==
As an Irish settlement, during the confederation debate of 1949, Flatrock had voted against confederation. To this day, Flatrock as an Irish settlement flies the Union Jack, the Irish Flag, and the traditional pink white and green flag of Newfoundland - as well as the American flag. A number of townsfolk would move to New England States and New York before Newfoundland joined Confederation to live with relatives. Some townsfolk had U.S. military service before confederation with Canada. Beárna na Gaoithe (Wind Gap) Road the main road going through the town is known to come from settlers that came from WindGap areas of County Waterford and County Kilkenny in Ireland. (citation: NL Archives:The Rooms)

== Demographics ==
In the 2021 Census of Population conducted by Statistics Canada, Flatrock had a population of 1,722 living in 638 of its 675 total private dwellings, a change of 2.3% from its 2016 population of 1,683. With a land area of 18.1 km^{2} (7.0 sq mi), it had a population density of 95.1/km^{2} (246.4/sq mi) in 2021.
