= Cape St. Francis (Newfoundland and Labrador) =

Headland on Newfoundland, Canada

- Cape
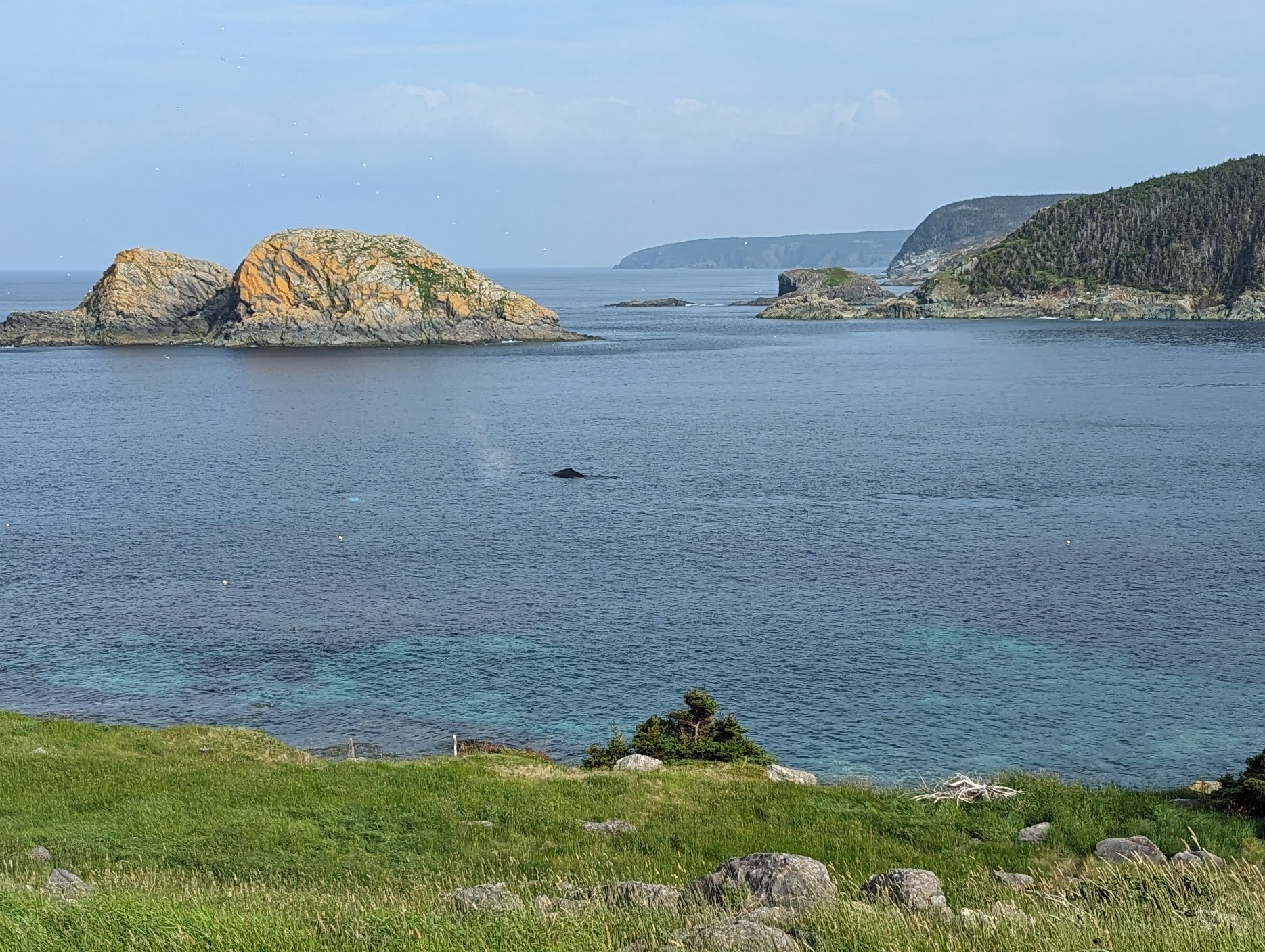
- Biscayan Cove, as seen from Cape St. Francis
- Interactive map of Cape St. Francis
- Location: 47°48′34.18″N 52°47′09.12″W
- Part of: Avalon Peninsula, Newfoundland and Labrador
- Water bodies: Biscayan Cove (east), Big Cove North (west), Labrador Sea (north)
- Topo map: NTS 1N15 Pouch Cove
- Cape St. Francis Lighthouse
- Constructed: 1877 (first)
- Construction: concrete building
- Height: 3 m (9.8 ft)
- Shape: lantern atop a 1-storey fog signal building
- Markings: white building with a broad vertical stripe
- Operator: Canadian Coast Guard
- Fog signal: 1 blast every 30s.
- First lit: 1957 (current)
- Focal height: 29 m (95 ft)
- Range: 15 nmi (28 km; 17 mi)
- Characteristic: Fl W 5s

The headland of Cape St. Francis is the outer extremity marking the boundary of Conception Bay on the Avalon Peninsula of the island of Newfoundland in the Canadian province of Newfoundland and Labrador. The International Maritime Organization also designates Cape St. Francis as the southern extremity of the Labrador Sea.

Previously known as Cape François.

== See also ==
- Cape St. Francis (electoral district)
- List of lighthouses in Canada
- Pouch Cove
