= Pouch Cove =

Coordinates: 47.767°N 52.767°W

- Town
- Town of Pouch Cove
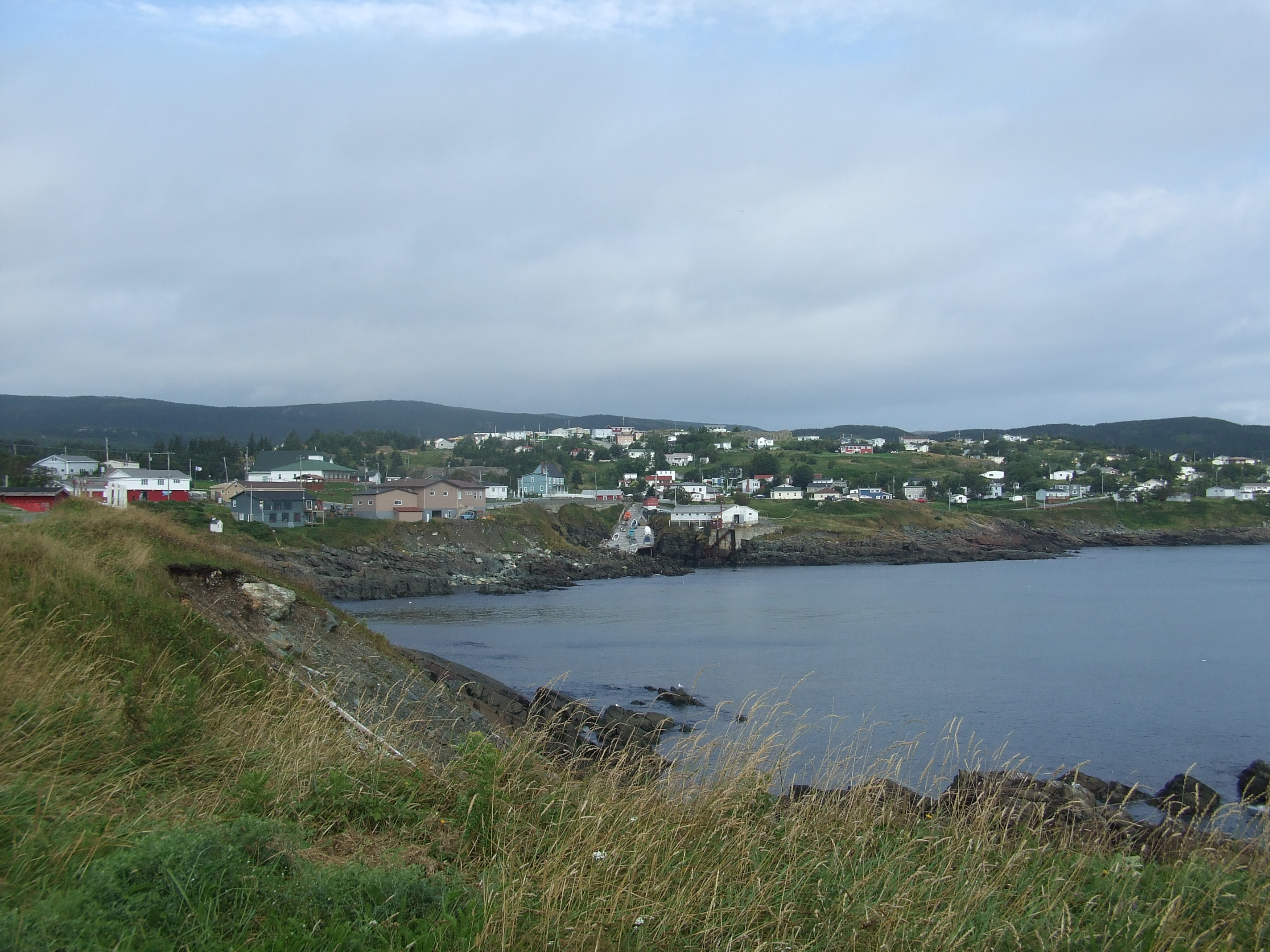
- Pouch Cove, Newfoundland and Labrador

- Seal
- Motto: First To See The Sun
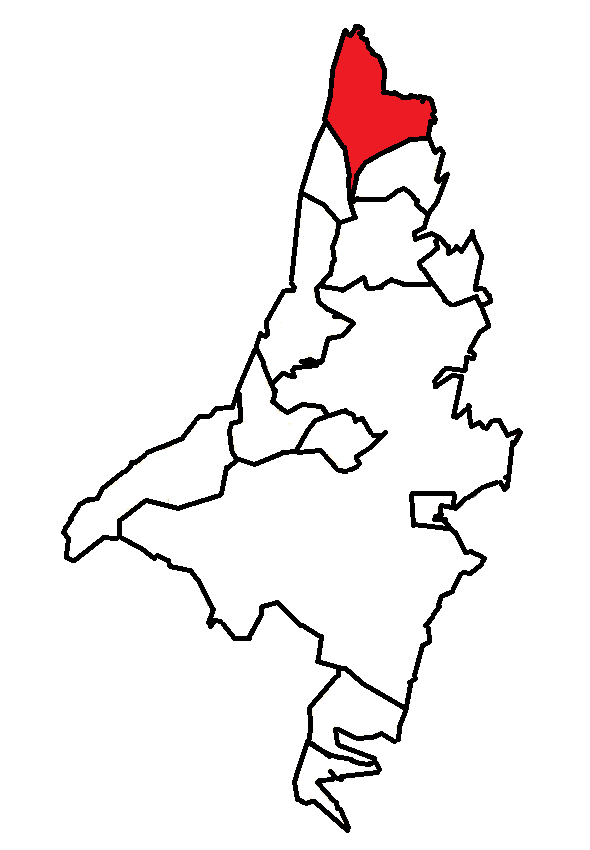
- Location of Pouch Cove in the St. John's Metropolitan Area.
- Country: Canada
- Province: Newfoundland and Labrador
- Founded: 1611
- Incorporated: 1970

Government
  - Mayor: Brad Richards
  - MHA: Joedy Wall (PC)
  - MP: Joanne Thompson (LIB)

Area
  - Total: 58.34 km^{2} (22.53 sq mi)

Population (2021)
  - Total: 2,063
  - Density: 35.5/km^{2} (92/sq mi)
- Time zone: UTC-3:30 (Newfoundland Time)
  - Summer (DST): UTC-2:30 (Newfoundland Daylight)
- Area code: 709
- Highways: Route 20
- Website: Pouch Cove

Pouch Cove (/puːtʃkoʊv/ POOCH-cove) is a town in the Canadian province of Newfoundland and Labrador. The population is 2,063 according to the Canada 2021 Census. It is located on the northeast Avalon Peninsula, 27 kilometres north of St. John's, the province's capital city.

The origin of Pouch Cove dates back to 1611, when fisherman from British ships, together with carpenters and other artisans, established a settlement. The town was officially incorporated in 1970. The post office was established in 1975. The Town has a Council consisting of a Mayor, Deputy Mayor, and five councillors. The town's motto is "first to see the sun," referring to the sunrise in North America.

In 1987 the municipality was amalgamated with the smaller rural settlement of Shoe Cove.

== Demographics ==
In the 2021 Census of Population conducted by Statistics Canada, Pouch Cove had a population of 2,063 living in 823 of its 872 total private dwellings, a change of −0.3% from its 2016 population of 2,069. With a land area of 58.24 km^{2} (22.49 sq mi), it had a population density of 35.4/km^{2} (91.7/sq mi) in 2021.

== Clifton Lodge ==
Clifton Lodge (Society of United Fisherman’s Lodge #42) was designated as a Registered Heritage Structure by the Heritage Foundation of Newfoundland and Labrador in 2022. The Lodge was founded in 1900 and received its name of “Clifton” after James A. Clift, the Grand Master of the Grand Lodge located in St. John’s. The original lodge was replaced by the current building, built between 1924 and 1926.

== Shoe Cove Satellite Station ==
Shoe Cove was home to a NASA-operated Spacecraft Tracking and Data Acquisition Network station starting in the early 1960s supporting Mercury, Gemini, and Apollo missions. Starting in 1977, the site was used by Canada Centre for Remote Sensing before being closed in 1982. The buildings and equipment were used by the geophysics research group in the Department of Geology at Memorial University of Newfoundland until 1990.

== See also ==
- Cape St. Francis (Newfoundland and Labrador)
- List of cities and towns in Newfoundland and Labrador
