= List of historic places on the Avalon Peninsula =

Location of Avalon Peninsula in Newfoundland

This is a list of historic places on the Avalon Peninsula in the Canadian province of Newfoundland and Labrador. This list contains entries on the Canadian Register of Historic Places, whether they are federal, provincial, or municipal, and excludes the more than 150 listings from the city of St. John's, which are listed separately.

== List of historic places ==
Name	Address	Coordinates	Government recognition (CRHP №)	Wikidata ID	Image
Admiralty House Museum and Archives	Mount Pearl NL	47°30′19″N 52°47′46″W	Mount Pearl municipality (2019)		Upload Photo
Alderdice Property Municipal Heritage Building	Conception Bay South NL	47°32′25″N 52°55′48″W	Conception Bay South municipality (2062)		Upload Photo
All Saints Anglican Cemetery #1 Municipal Heritage Site	Conception Bay South NL	47°30′51″N 52°59′01″W	Conception Bay South municipality (2292)		Upload Photo
Anderson's Shed Municipal Heritage Site	New Perlican NL	47°30′51″N 52°59′01″W	New Perlican municipality (19550)		Upload Photo
Anglo American Telegraph Company Cable Office Registered Heritage Structure	Placentia NL	47°14′51″N 53°57′40″W	Newfoundland and Labrador (3845), Placentia municipality (6249)		
Argentia 282 Coastal Defence Battery Registered Heritage Structure	Placentia NL	47°16′24″N 53°59′23″W	Newfoundland and Labrador (3843), Placentia municipality (6122)		Upload Photo
Avondale Railway Station	Avondale NL	47°24′27″N 53°12′17″W	Newfoundland and Labrador (2102)		
Bartlett/Burke House	Brigus NL	47°31′58″N 53°12′31″W	Newfoundland and Labrador (2050)		Upload Photo
Joseph Bartlett House	Brigus NL	47°31′59″N 53°12′36″W	Newfoundland and Labrador (2226)		
Bay Bulls Harbour Provincial Historic Site	Shipwreck in the harbour Bay Bulls NL	47°18′45″N 52°48′28″W	Newfoundland and Labrador (3481)		Upload Photo
Bay Roberts Railway Station Municipal Heritage Site	Bay Roberts NL	47°35′41″N 53°16′29″W	Newfoundland and Labrador (8003), Bay Roberts municipality (13238)		Upload Photo
Beckett Property	Old Perlican NL	48°04′59″N 53°00′23″W	Newfoundland and Labrador (1928)		
Bell Island No. 2 Mine Registered Heritage Structure	Wabana NL	47°38′47″N 52°56′50″W	Newfoundland and Labrador (6245)		
Bell Rock Municipal Heritage Site	Fermeuse NL	46°58′36″N 52°57′32″W	Fermeuse municipality (5313)		Upload Photo
Blessing of the Fleet and Homily Site	Flatrock NL	47°42′18″N 52°42′37″W	Flatrock municipality (4438)		
Blundon House	Bay de Verde NL	48°05′11″N 52°53′55″W	Newfoundland and Labrador (2096)		
Mary Boland House Registered Heritage Structure	Calvert NL	47°03′33″N 52°54′41″W	Newfoundland and Labrador (2230)		Upload Photo
Branch Cove Fossiliferous Rocks Municipal Heritage Site	Branch NL	46°52′09″N 53°57′13″W	Branch municipality (12902)		
Brigus Historical Zone	Brigus NL	47°31′58″N 53°12′31″W	Brigus municipality (5455)		Upload Photo
Bulger, A Name Rock Municipal Heritage Site	Cupids NL	47°32′51″N 53°13′26″W	Cupids municipality (10851)		Upload Photo
Burgess Fishing Property Municipal Heritage Building	Whiteway NL	47°40′51″N 53°29′12″W	Whiteway municipality (5467)		Upload Photo
Burnt Head Arch Municipal Heritage Site	Cupids NL	47°34′09″N 53°12′03″W	Cupids municipality (10855)		
Burrage's Stage Municipal Heritage Site	New Perlican NL	47°54′37″N 53°21′32″W	New Perlican municipality (15372)		
Butler Property	Cupids NL	47°33′40″N 53°12′38″W	Newfoundland and Labrador (2043)		
Butler's Store Municipal Heritage Building	Conception Bay South NL	47°30′33″N 52°59′15″W	Conception Bay South municipality (2058)		Upload Photo
Cable Avenue Municipal Heritage District	Cable Avenue; Bay Roberts NL	47°35′48″N 53°15′14″W	Newfoundland and Labrador (19611), Bay Roberts municipality (18903)		
Cable Building National Historic Site of Canada	Water Street; Bay Roberts NL	47°35′48″N 53°15′14″W	Federal (11970), Newfoundland and Labrador (2040), Bay Roberts municipality (13239)		
Cable Staff House #1	Heart's Content NL	47°52′25″N 53°22′03″W	Newfoundland and Labrador (2225)		
Cable Staff House #2	Heart's Content NL	47°52′25″N 53°22′03″W	Newfoundland and Labrador (2224)		
Calpin/Myers Property Municipal Heritage Site	Bay Roberts NL	47°35′38″N 53°15′46″W	Bay Roberts municipality (15370)		Upload Photo
Cape Pine Lighthouse National Historic Site of Canada	Cape Pine NL	46°37′02″N 53°31′57″W	Federal (10586)		
Cape Pine Lighthouse Recognized Federal Heritage Building	Cape Pine NL	46°37′02″N 53°31′57″W	Federal (3634)		
Cape Race Lighthouse	Cape Race NL	46°39′46″N 53°04′38″W	Federal (3627, (21138)		
Cape Race Lighthouse National Historic Site of Canada	Cape Race NL	46°39′31″N 53°04′25″W	Federal (10652)		
Cape St. Mary's Light Tower	St. Bride's NL	46°49′23″N 54°11′46″W	Federal (13042, (20779)		
Castle Hill National Historic Site of Canada	Route 100; Placentia NL	47°15′05″N 53°58′20″W	Federal (7565)		
Cathedral of Immaculate Conception	Harbour Grace NL	47°41′44″N 53°12′41″W	Newfoundland and Labrador (2326)		
Chapel Cemetery Municipal Heritage Site	Holyrood NL	47°39′18″N 52°43′33″W	Holyrood municipality (10190)		Upload Photo
Chief Operator's House Municipal Heritage Building	Conception Bay South NL	47°27′22″N 53°04′03″W	Conception Bay South municipality (5935)		Upload Photo
Chisholm House Municipal Heritage Site	Conception Bay South NL	47°31′15″N 52°57′06″W	Conception Bay South municipality (12927)		Upload Photo
Codner House and Shed	Torbay NL	47°39′36″N 52°43′57″W	Torbay municipality (4492)		Upload Photo
Colony of Avalon Special Preservation Area Municipal Heritage District	Ferryland NL	47°01′22″N 52°52′48″W	Federal (19508), Ferryland municipality (14542)		
Aubrey and Elizabeth Crowley Property	Ochre Pit Cove NL	47°54′33″N 53°04′00″W	Newfoundland and Labrador (1901)		
Custard Head Fishing Premises	Hant's Harbour NL	48°00′56″N 53°15′33″W	Newfoundland and Labrador (2199)		
Davis House	Freshwater NL	47°45′24″N 53°11′04″W	Newfoundland and Labrador (1886)		
Dawe Property World War Two Site Municipal Heritage Site	Flats Road, Manuels; Conception Bay South NL	47°45′24″N 53°11′04″W	Conception Bay South municipality (18963)		Upload Photo
Devil's Rock	Renews-Cappahayden NL	46°55′58″N 52°56′42″W	Renews-Cappahayden municipality (4435)		Upload Photo
The Downs Historic Conservation Area	Ferryland NL	47°01′08″N 52°51′41″W	Ferryland municipality (6119)		
Drake House Registered Heritage Structure	Arnold's Cove NL	47°45′58″N 53°59′12″W	Newfoundland and Labrador (1781)		
Drogheda (Valley of Hope)	Clarke's Beach NL	47°30′27″N 53°18′30″W	Newfoundland and Labrador (1897)		Upload Photo
Ferryland Head Lighthouse Keeper's Dwelling Municipal Heritage Site	Ferryland NL	47°01′00″N 52°51′28″W	Ferryland municipality (5534)		
First Anglican Cemetery and War Memorial Site Municipal Heritage Site	Arnold's Cove NL	47°45′27″N 53°59′24″W	Arnold's Cove municipality (11941)		
Fjordheim Property Municipal Heritage Site	Holyrood NL	47°23′43″N 53°07′12″W	Holyrood municipality (10192)		Upload Photo
Former Carbonear Railway Station (Newfoundland Railway) National Historic Site of Canada	Carbonear NL	47°44′15″N 53°13′46″W	Federal (14129), Newfoundland and Labrador (1975), Carbonear municipality (12906)		
Fort Frederick	Placentia NL	47°14′57″N 53°57′42″W	Placentia municipality (4067)		
Fowler House	Brigus NL	47°32′16″N 53°12′36″W	Newfoundland and Labrador (1888)		
Geehan Building Municipal Heritage Building	Conception Bay South NL	47°32′23″N 52°55′20″W	Conception Bay South municipality (7468)		Upload Photo
Goodland House	Harbour Grace NL	47°41′28″N 53°13′24″W	Newfoundland and Labrador (1996)		
Mark Gosse Residence	Spaniard's Bay NL	47°36′30″N 53°17′09″W	Newfoundland and Labrador (2039)		
John Guy Flag Site Municipal Heritage Structure	Cupids NL	47°32′52″N 53°13′42″W	Cupids municipality (10603)		
Harbour Grace Court House National Historic Site of Canada	2 Harvey Street; Harbour Grace NL	47°41′00″N 53°15′45″W	Federal (7537)		
Harbour Grace Fire Bell	Harbour Grace NL	47°41′25″N 53°13′15″W	Harbour Grace municipality (4185)		Upload Photo
Harbour Grace Registered Heritage District	Harbour Grace NL	47°41′35″N 53°12′44″W	Newfoundland and Labrador (2381)		
Harry's Brook Municipal Heritage Site	Harry's Brook, running between Tory Road and Harbour Road; New Perlican NL	47°54′32″N 53°21′33″W	New Perlican municipality (19549)		
Hawthorne Cottage National Historic Site of Canada	north side of Irishtown Road; Brigus NL	47°32′07″N 53°12′31″W	Federal (16784, (2634)		
Hearn House	Brigus NL	47°32′06″N 53°12′41″W	Newfoundland and Labrador (2229)		Upload Photo
The Hearth Municipal Heritage Site	Branch NL	46°52′48″N 53°57′13″W	Branch municipality (12903)		Upload Photo
Heart's Content Cable Station	Heart's Content NL	47°52′22″N 53°22′11″W	Newfoundland and Labrador (3057)		
Heart's Content Lighthouse	North Point Road, north side of harbour mouth Heart's Content NL	47°52′56″N 53°23′07″W	Federal (20749, (3975)		
Heart's Content Registered Historic District	Central village of Heart's Content; Heart's Content NL	47°52′56″N 53°23′07″W	Newfoundland and Labrador (19612)		
The Herder Property Municipal Heritage Site	Conception Bay South NL	47°31′47″N 52°57′28″W	Conception Bay South municipality (13257)		Upload Photo
The Hermitage Registered Heritage Structure	Conception Bay South NL	47°32′14″N 52°56′14″W	Newfoundland and Labrador (5934), Conception Bay South municipality (14002)		
Heyfield Memorial United Church and Cemetery Municipal Heritage Site	Water side of Route 80; Heart's Content NL	47°53′44″N 53°22′05″W	Newfoundland and Labrador (19411), Heart's Content municipality (7307)		
Historic Ferryland Museum Municipal Heritage Site	Ferryland NL	47°01′35″N 52°53′04″W	Ferryland municipality (5533)		
Holy Apostles Church	Renews-Cappahayden NL	46°55′42″N 52°54′41″W	Newfoundland and Labrador (2110)		
Holy Trinity Convent and Chapel Registered Heritage Structure	Witless Bay NL	47°16′52″N 52°49′53″W	Newfoundland and Labrador (3761)		
Holy Trinity Roman Catholic Church Registered Heritage Structure	Ferryland NL	47°01′31″N 52°53′04″W	Newfoundland and Labrador (1939)		
Immaculate Conception Cemetery Municipal Heritage Site	Cape Broyle NL	47°05′55″N 52°56′29″W	Cape Broyle municipality (5764)		
Immaculate Conception Church and Grounds Municipal Heritage Site	Cape Broyle NL	47°05′47″N 52°56′41″W	Cape Broyle municipality (5865)		
Bernard Kavanagh Premises Municipal Heritage Site	Ferryland NL	47°01′25″N 52°53′02″W	Ferryland municipality (5456)		
Keneally House	Carbonear NL	47°44′20″N 53°13′50″W	Newfoundland and Labrador (2103)		
Mother M. Bernard Kirwan Memorial Municipal Heritage Site	Port Kirwan NL	46°58′10″N 52°54′34″W	Port Kirwan municipality (7278)		
Lakeview Registered Heritage Structure	Brigus NL	47°32′01″N 53°12′30″W	Newfoundland and Labrador (8005)		Upload Photo
Landfall (Kent Cottage) Registered Heritage Structure	Brigus NL	47°32′32″N 53°12′12″W	Newfoundland and Labrador (2273)		
The Liberal Rock Municipal Heritage Site	Peddle's Lane; New Perlican NL	47°54′38″N 53°21′23″W	New Perlican municipality (19530)		Upload Photo
Lighttower	Bull Head; Bay Bulls NL	47°18′39″N 52°44′50″W	Federal (9729)		
Lighttower	Brigus NL	47°32′54″N 53°10′56″W	Federal (3992)		Upload Photo
Lloyd George House	Dildo NL	47°34′05″N 53°33′19″W	Newfoundland and Labrador (1929)		Upload Photo
Loyal Orange Lodge LOL #9	Green's Harbour NL	47°37′59″N 53°30′36″W	Newfoundland and Labrador (2198)		Upload Photo
Lulah-Oh! / Carroll Property Municipal Heritage Site	Holyrood NL	47°23′19″N 53°08′11″W	Holyrood municipality (8371)		
Manuels River Linear Park Municipal Heritage Site	Conception Bay South NL	47°31′15″N 52°56′46″W	Conception Bay South municipality (10638)		
The Maples	Harbour Grace NL	47°41′34″N 53°12′55″W	Harbour Grace municipality (4192)		
Markland Cottage Hospital Registered Heritage Structure	Markland NL	47°24′10″N 53°32′41″W	Newfoundland and Labrador (7784)		Upload Photo
Masonic Lodge Harbour Grace #476 A.F. and A.M., S.C	Harbour Grace NL	47°41′29″N 53°13′21″W	Harbour Grace municipality (4189)		
Metcalfe Slaughter House and Barn, Upper Barn, Office and Shed Municipal Heritage Site	Conception Bay South NL	47°31′32″N 52°56′41″W	Conception Bay South municipality (14622)		Upload Photo
Midnight Hill and Grotto de Lourdes on Mass Rock Municipal Heritage Site	Renews-Cappahayden NL	46°55′43″N 52°55′58″W	Renews-Cappahayden municipality (4683)		
Miller House Municipal Heritage Site	Conception Bay South NL	47°32′24″N 52°55′41″W	Conception Bay South municipality (16263)		Upload Photo
Paddy Miller House Municipal Heritage Building	Southern Harbour NL	47°42′32″N 53°58′12″W	Southern Harbour municipality (8146)		Upload Photo
Morgan House	Conception Bay South NL	47°27′23″N 53°05′20″W	Newfoundland and Labrador (2174), Conception Bay South municipality (14001)		Upload Photo
Mosquito School House	Bristol's Hope NL	47°43′06″N 53°11′31″W	Newfoundland and Labrador (2052)		Upload Photo
North Side Burial Ground Municipal Heritage Site	Ferryland NL	47°01′53″N 52°53′00″W	Ferryland municipality (12907)		Upload Photo
R.J. O'Brien's General Store	Cape Broyle NL	47°05′45″N 52°56′55″W	Newfoundland and Labrador (3844)		
The Old Bark Pot Municipal Heritage Site	Along Beach Road in The Pool; Ferryland NL	47°44′20″N 53°13′29″W	Ferryland municipality (18944)		
Old Carbonear Post Office	Carbonear NL	47°44′20″N 53°13′29″W	Newfoundland and Labrador (1851)		
Old Cemetery	Renews-Cappahayden NL	46°55′25″N 52°55′52″W	Renews-Cappahayden municipality (4437)		
Old Cemetery Municipal Heritage Site	Port Kirwan NL	46°58′15″N 52°54′35″W	Port Kirwan municipality (5050)		
The Old Graveyard Municipal Heritage Site	Branch NL	46°52′52″N 53°57′06″W	Branch municipality (12904)		Upload Photo
Old Holy Trinity Parish Cemetery Municipal Heritage Site	Torbay NL	47°39′17″N 52°43′33″W	Torbay municipality (8243)		Upload Photo
Old Lighthouse Site Municipal Heritage Site	Cupids NL	47°33′18″N 53°13′36″W	Cupids municipality (10853)		
Old St. Nicholas Anglican Cemetery Municipal Heritage Site	Torbay NL	47°39′36″N 52°43′53″W	Torbay municipality (8147)		Upload Photo
Old Witless Bay Cemetery	Witless Bay NL	47°16′47″N 52°49′19″W	Witless Bay municipality (5052)		Upload Photo
O'Reilly House Registered Heritage Structure	48 Orcan Drive; Placentia NL	47°14′46″N 53°57′36″W	Newfoundland and Labrador (2233), Placentia municipality (6120)		
Otterbury School House	Harbour Grace NL	47°40′35″N 53°15′01″W	Harbour Grace municipality (4191)		
Our Lady of Angels / Presentation Convent Registered Heritage Structure	Placentia NL	47°14′39″N 53°57′41″W	Newfoundland and Labrador (2234), Placentia municipality (6248)		
Our Lady of Lourdes Grotto	Flatrock NL	47°42′18″N 52°42′48″W	Flatrock municipality (4502)		
John Parot's Grave Municipal Heritage Site	Old Perlican NL	48°05′07″N 53°00′12″W	Old Perlican municipality (5668)		Upload Photo
Payne House	Harbour Grace NL	47°41′23″N 53°13′31″W	Newfoundland and Labrador (1997)		
Peter's Finger Municipal Heritage Site	A large outcrop of rock located in the southwestern corner of New Perlican, west of Route 80 and south of Vitter's Cove Road. New Perlican NL	47°54′29″N 53°22′15″W	New Perlican municipality (18907)		
Petty Harbour Hydro-Electric Generating Station	Petty Harbour NL	47°27′55″N 52°42′43″W	Newfoundland and Labrador (4326)		
Gordon G. Pike Railway Heritage Museum and Park	Harbour Grace NL	47°41′45″N 53°13′06″W	Harbour Grace municipality (4184)		
Pinehurst	Carbonear NL	47°44′20″N 53°13′18″W	Newfoundland and Labrador (2073)		
The Plot Municipal Heritage Site	Branch NL	46°52′53″N 53°57′06″W	Branch municipality (12911)		Upload Photo
Porter House	Port de Grave NL	47°36′02″N 53°11′06″W	Newfoundland and Labrador (2042)		Upload Photo
Powell House	Carbonear NL	47°44′27″N 53°12′35″W	Newfoundland and Labrador (2053)		
Presentation Cemetery Municipal Heritage Site	Renews-Cappahayden NL	46°55′43″N 52°56′01″W	Renews-Cappahayden municipality (5051)		
Presentation Convent Grounds Municipal Heritage Site	Renews-Cappahayden NL	46°55′43″N 52°55′59″W	Renews-Cappahayden municipality (5385)		
Prince of Orange Loyal Orange Lodge LOL#23 Municipal Heritage Building	Conception Bay South NL	47°30′18″N 53°00′20″W	Conception Bay South municipality (2059)		Upload Photo
Reid's General Store	Heart's Delight-Islington NL	47°46′16″N 53°27′54″W	Newfoundland and Labrador (2227)		Upload Photo
Abram Richards Property	Bareneed NL	47°34′09″N 53°15′34″W	Newfoundland and Labrador (1785)		Upload Photo
Ridley Hall Ruins Registered Heritage Structure	Harbour Grace NL	47°41′34″N 53°12′55″W	Newfoundland and Labrador (8582)		
Ridley Office	Harbour Grace NL	47°41′29″N 53°13′00″W	Newfoundland and Labrador (2317)		
The Road House Municipal Heritage Site	Conception Bay South NL	47°32′20″N 52°56′11″W	Conception Bay South municipality (16264)		Upload Photo
Rock with 17th and 18th Century Graffiti Municipal Heritage Site	Fermeuse NL	46°57′44″N 52°56′11″W	Fermeuse municipality (5962)		Upload Photo
Rock with 19th Century Graffiti Carvings Municipal Heritage Site	Fermeuse NL	46°57′40″N 52°54′40″W	Fermeuse municipality (5967)		Upload Photo
Roman Catholic Parish Cemetery	Harbour Grace NL	47°41′33″N 53°13′04″W	Harbour Grace municipality (4190)		
Rorke's Stone Jug	Carbonear NL	47°44′18″N 53°13′47″W	Newfoundland and Labrador (2143)		
Rorke Store	Carbonear NL	47°44′18″N 53°13′32″W	Newfoundland and Labrador (1881)		
Rothesay House, Munn/Godden Residence	Harbour Grace NL	47°41′37″N 53°12′46″W	Newfoundland and Labrador (3305)		
Rural Retreat (Peach's Farm)	Carbonear NL	47°44′51″N 53°13′15″W	Newfoundland and Labrador (2142)		Upload Photo
St. Charles Borromeo Church and Grounds Municipal Heritage Site	Fermeuse NL	46°58′39″N 52°57′31″W	Fermeuse municipality (5532)		
St. George's Anglican Church	Brigus NL	47°32′11″N 53°12′27″W	Newfoundland and Labrador (2076)		
St. James Anglican Church Registered Heritage Structure	Carbonear NL	47°44′30″N 53°13′27″W	Newfoundland and Labrador (2041)		
St. John the Evangelist Anglican Church Municipal Heritage Site	Conception Bay South NL	47°32′14″N 52°56′14″W	Newfoundland and Labrador (2179), Conception Bay South municipality (13716)		
St. John the Evangelist Cemetery Municipal Heritage Site	Conception Bay South NL	47°32′14″N 52°56′14″W	Conception Bay South municipality (7466)		
St. Luke's Cultural Heritage Centre	Bankers Rd; Placentia NL	47°14′46″N 53°57′42″W	Newfoundland and Labrador (2327), Placentia municipality (6247)		
St. Matthew's United Church Southside Cemetery Municipal Heritage Site	New Perlican NL	47°54′40″N 53°21′24″W	New Perlican municipality (14004)		
St. Paul's Anglican Church	Harbour Grace NL	47°41′44″N 53°13′02″W	Newfoundland and Labrador (2144)		
St. Peter's Anglican Church and Cemetery Municipal Heritage Site	Conception Bay South NL	47°28′43″N 53°03′14″W	Conception Bay South municipality (2063)		
St. Thomas of Villa Nova Cemetery Municipal Heritage Site	Conception Bay South NL	47°31′25″N 52°56′51″W	Conception Bay South municipality (7467)		
Salvation Army Cemetery Municipal Heritage Site	Arnold's Cove NL	47°45′21″N 53°59′37″W	Arnold's Cove municipality (11940)		
Second Anglican Cemetery Municipal Heritage Site	Arnold's Cove NL	47°45′19″N 53°59′24″W	Arnold's Cove municipality (11942)		Upload Photo
Shano/Le Shane Property Registered Heritage Structure	Lower Island Cove NL	48°00′31″N 52°58′31″W	Newfoundland and Labrador (6246)		
Sittin' Rock Municipal Heritage Site	New Perlican NL	47°54′15″N 53°21′25″W	New Perlican municipality (14003)		Upload Photo
Society of United Fishermen Lodge SUF #1	Heart's Content NL	47°52′30″N 53°22′11″W	Newfoundland and Labrador (2202)		
Somerton Property	Wabana NL	47°38′47″N 52°56′47″W	Newfoundland and Labrador (1866)		Upload Photo
South Side Burial Ground Municipal Heritage Site	Ferryland NL	47°01′25″N 52°53′08″W	Ferryland municipality (12908)		Upload Photo
Spaniard's Bay United Church Registered Heritage Structure	Spaniard's Bay NL	47°37′15″N 53°16′35″W	Newfoundland and Labrador (7783), Spaniard's Bay municipality (6192)		Upload Photo
Stone Barn	Brigus NL	47°32′08″N 53°12′35″W	Newfoundland and Labrador (1671)		
Topsail United Church Cemetery Municipal Heritage Site	Conception Bay South NL	47°32′21″N 52°56′14″W	Conception Bay South municipality (2291)		
Tower	Ferryland NL	47°54′29″N 53°21′29″W	Federal (4728)		
Town of New Perlican Heritage Conservation Zone Municipal Heritage District	New Perlican NL	47°54′29″N 53°21′29″W	New Perlican municipality (8148)		
Trahey Property	Conception Harbour NL	47°26′27″N 53°12′27″W	Newfoundland and Labrador (2182)		Upload Photo
Upper Gullies United Church Cemetery Municipal Heritage Site	Conception Bay South NL	47°29′05″N 53°02′37″W	Conception Bay South municipality (14683)		
Veitch Property Municipal Heritage Site	Holyrood NL	47°23′14″N 53°08′10″W	Holyrood municipality (10193)		Upload Photo
Victoria Hydro-Electric Generating Station	Victoria NL	47°46′31″N 53°12′55″W	Newfoundland and Labrador (4327)		
Victoria Manor	Harbour Grace NL	47°41′32″N 53°13′26″W	Newfoundland and Labrador (2044)		
Wakeham Sawmill Registered Heritage Structure	Placentia NL	47°14′44″N 53°57′31″W	Newfoundland and Labrador (4041), Placentia municipality (6123)		
Walled Landscape of Grates Cove National Historic Site of Canada	Grates Cove NL	48°10′00″N 52°56′00″W	Federal (12745)		
War Memorial Municipal Heritage Site	Branch NL	46°52′54″N 53°57′24″W	Branch municipality (12905)		
Waterloo Loyal Orange Lodge No. 18 Municipal Heritage Site	New Perlican NL	47°54′30″N 53°21′29″W	New Perlican municipality (14413)		
62 Water Street	62 Water Street; Carbonear NL	47°44′27″N 53°12′30″W	Newfoundland and Labrador (1993)		
West End Mercantile Establishment	Harbour Grace NL	47°41′23″N 53°13′31″W	Newfoundland and Labrador (3081)		
Western Bay Railway Station	Western Bay NL	47°52′49″N 53°05′13″W	Newfoundland and Labrador (2067)		
West Point Cemetery Municipal Heritage Site	Portugal Cove-St. Philip's NL	47°37′24″N 52°51′58″W	Portugal Cove-St. Philip's municipality (12064)		Upload Photo
White House	Portugal Cove NL	47°37′21″N 52°51′38″W	Newfoundland and Labrador (3842)		Upload Photo
Winter Home	Clarke's Beach NL	47°32′29″N 53°16′29″W	Newfoundland and Labrador (2055)		
Women's Patriotic Association War Memorial Municipal Heritage Site	Sunnyside NL	47°51′30″N 53°55′20″W	Sunnyside municipality (7465)		

== See also ==
- List of historic places in Newfoundland and Labrador
- List of National Historic Sites of Canada in Newfoundland and Labrador
