= List of historic places in central Newfoundland =

This article is a list of historic places in central Newfoundland. These properties are entered on the Canadian Register of Historic Places, whether they are federal, provincial, or municipal. The list contains entries from communities in census divisions 2, 3, 6, and 8. This grouping encompasses the central portions of the island of Newfoundland, including communities on Notre Dame Bay, the Burin Peninsula, and the southern shore between the Burin Peninsula and Cape Ray.

== List of historic places ==
Name	Address	Coordinates	Government recognition (CRHP №)	Wikidata ID	Image
Ashbourne Longhouse	Twillingate NL	49°39′19″N 54°45′40″W	Newfoundland and Labrador (2308), Twillingate municipality (16265)		More images
Ashbourne's Lower Trade General Store Municipal Heritage Site	Sellen's Cove Road; Twillingate NL	49°39′21″N 54°46′33″W	Twillingate municipality (18946)		Upload Photo
Ashbourne Office Registered Heritage Structure	Twillingate NL	49°39′19″N 54°45′40″W	Newfoundland and Labrador (12899), Twillingate municipality (18716)		
Ashbourne Shop Registered Heritage Structure	Twillingate NL	49°39′19″N 54°45′40″W	Newfoundland and Labrador (12900)		
Bank of Nova Scotia	Burin NL	47°04′32″N 55°08′20″W	Newfoundland and Labrador (2016)		Upload Photo
Alphaeus Barbour House	Newtown NL	49°12′06″N 53°30′55″W	Newfoundland and Labrador (2108)		Upload Photo
Benjamin Barbour House	New-Wes-Valley NL	49°12′06″N 53°30′56″W	Newfoundland and Labrador (2201)		Upload Photo
Beaver Pond Municipal Heritage Site	Harbour Breton NL	47°28′37″N 55°49′55″W	Harbour Breton municipality (11962)		Upload Photo
Bethany United Church	Petites NL	47°37′12″N 58°37′49″W	Newfoundland and Labrador (2318)		Upload Photo
Bleak House Registered Heritage Structure	Fogo NL	49°43′06″N 54°17′10″W	Newfoundland and Labrador (1891), Fogo municipality (10194)		Upload Photo
Boyd's Cove Beothuk National Historic Site of Canada	Boyd's Cove NL	49°27′45″N 54°37′46″W	Federal (10557)		More images
Brett House and Outbuildings	Joe Batt's Arm-Barr'd Islands-Shoal Bay NL	49°43′47″N 54°10′24″W	Newfoundland and Labrador (2228), Joe Batt's Arm-Barr'd Islands-Shoal Bay municipality (8144)		Upload Photo
John and Ann Brinson House	Carmanville South NL	49°23′58″N 54°15′36″W	Newfoundland and Labrador (2134)		Upload Photo
Buffett House Registered Heritage Structure	Grand Bank NL	47°06′08″N 55°45′15″W	Newfoundland and Labrador (7779)		Upload Photo
Cape Chapeau Rouge Municipal Heritage Site	St. Lawrence NL	46°53′26″N 55°22′31″W	St. Lawrence municipality (3593)		Upload Photo
Cape Ray Light Tower	Cape Ray NL	47°37′16″N 59°18′14″W	Federal (13113, (21137)		
Hector Carter House, Henhouse, Fishing Shed and Property Registered Heritage Structure	Greenspond NL	49°04′07″N 53°34′03″W	Newfoundland and Labrador (10636)		Upload Photo
Cemetery for Priests and Religious Sisters Municipal Heritage Site	St. Lawrence NL	46°55′17″N 55°22′39″W	St. Lawrence municipality (5452)		Upload Photo
Channel Head Lighttower	Channel-Port aux Basques NL	47°33′58″N 59°07′26″W	Federal (3901)		More images
Noah Chippett Stage/Twine Loft and Wharf Municipal Heritage Site	Leading Tickles NL	49°30′04″N 55°28′05″W	Leading Tickles municipality (7308)		Upload Photo
Roland Chippett Stage Municipal Heritage Building	Leading Tickles NL	49°30′04″N 55°28′05″W	Leading Tickles municipality (7309)		Upload Photo
Church of England Cemetery Municipal Heritage Site	Causeway Extension; Burnt Islands NL	47°35′57″N 58°53′25″W	Burnt Islands municipality (13793)		Upload Photo
Cluett House Registered Heritage Structure	Belleoram NL	47°31′00″N 55°25′00″W	Newfoundland and Labrador (2089)		Upload Photo
Cluett House Registered Heritage Structure	Hillcrest Road; Ramea NL	47°31′23″N 57°23′19″W	Newfoundland and Labrador (19793)		Upload Photo
Connaught Hall Masonic Lodge #9	Botwood NL	49°08′36″N 55°20′28″W	Newfoundland and Labrador (2325)		Upload Photo
Deadman's Cove Municipal Heritage Site	Harbour Breton NL	47°28′01″N 55°50′49″W	Harbour Breton municipality (15369)		Upload Photo
Doloman's Point Municipal Heritage Site	Gambo NL	48°47′21″N 54°11′25″W	Gambo municipality (19144)		Upload Photo
Dwyer House	Tilting NL	49°42′20″N 54°03′31″W	Newfoundland and Labrador (2170)		Upload Photo
Fidelity Lodge #5	Grand Bank NL	47°06′08″N 55°45′21″W	Newfoundland and Labrador (1893), Grand Bank municipality (7458)		Upload Photo
Fishermen's Union Trading Company Cash Store Registered Heritage Structure	Musgrave Harbour NL	49°26′59″N 53°56′35″W	Newfoundland and Labrador (8145)		Upload Photo
Fishermen's Union Trading Company Premises Registered Heritage Structure	Seldom-Little Seldom NL	49°36′36″N 54°11′06″W	Newfoundland and Labrador (15663)		Upload Photo
Fleur de Lys Dorset Soapstone Quarry	Near Highway 410, locality 1 Fleur de Lys NL	50°07′11″N 56°07′27″W	Federal (18943), Newfoundland and Labrador (4127)		Upload Photo
Fogo Courthouse and Public Building Municipal Heritage Site	Fogo NL	49°42′54″N 54°16′52″W	Fogo municipality (15365)		Upload Photo
Fogo United Church	Fogo NL	49°42′53″N 54°16′56″W	Newfoundland and Labrador (2024)		Upload Photo
Pearce Foley House Registered Heritage Structure	Tilting NL	49°42′18″N 54°03′31″W	Newfoundland and Labrador (2296)		Upload Photo
J. B. Foote House Municipal Heritage Building	Grand Bank NL	47°06′09″N 55°45′31″W	Grand Bank municipality (7461)		Upload Photo
Fortune Fishing Sheds Municipal Heritage Site	Fortune NL	47°04′25″N 55°49′35″W	Fortune municipality (5866)		Upload Photo
Frazer Park Municipal Heritage Site	Grand Bank NL	47°06′04″N 55°45′14″W	Grand Bank municipality (7459)		Upload Photo
Friar's Cove Municipal Heritage Site	Harbour Breton NL	47°27′50″N 55°47′49″W	Harbour Breton municipality (15368)		Upload Photo
Gorman/Hynes House Municipal Heritage Site	Harbour Breton NL	47°28′19″N 55°49′37″W	Harbour Breton municipality (13794)		Upload Photo
H.C. Grant Heritage Museum Registered Heritage Structure	Springdale NL	49°29′48″N 56°04′13″W	Newfoundland and Labrador (4017), Springdale municipality (5348)		Upload Photo
Martin Greene House and Outbuildings	Tilting NL	49°42′08″N 54°03′50″W	Newfoundland and Labrador (2025)		Upload Photo
Greenspond Courthouse	Greenspond NL	49°04′07″N 53°34′05″W	Newfoundland and Labrador (2074)		Upload Photo
Gun Hill Municipal Heritage Site	Harbour Breton NL	47°29′20″N 55°48′40″W	Harbour Breton municipality (11963)		Upload Photo
Harbour Breton Landslide Monument Municipal Heritage Site	Harbour Breton NL	47°28′44″N 55°48′22″W	Harbour Breton municipality (13240)		Upload Photo
Harding House	Greenspond NL	49°04′07″N 53°34′03″W	Newfoundland and Labrador (1887)		Upload Photo
Harmsworth Hall	Grand Falls-Windsor NL	49°00′35″N 55°30′31″W	Newfoundland and Labrador (2560)		More images
George C. Harris House	Grand Bank NL	47°06′03″N 55°45′14″W	Newfoundland and Labrador (2195), Grand Bank municipality (7460)		Upload Photo
Hart's Cove General Cemetery Municipal Heritage Site	Twillingate NL	49°39′47″N 54°45′32″W	Twillingate municipality (16267)		
Patrick Hayden Residence	Petit Forte NL	47°23′43″N 54°40′06″W	Newfoundland and Labrador (5314)		Upload Photo
Hewlett House and Grounds Municipal Heritage Site	Roberts Arm NL	49°29′02″N 55°50′30″W	Roberts Arm municipality (5966)		Upload Photo
Hodge Brothers Premises Registered Heritage Structure	Twillingate NL	49°39′26″N 54°46′29″W	Newfoundland and Labrador (5356), Twillingate municipality (18909)		Upload Photo
Hunt's Point Municipal Heritage Site	Harbour Breton NL	47°29′06″N 55°48′07″W	Harbour Breton municipality (12909)		Upload Photo
Iron Springs Mine Municipal Heritage Site	St. Lawrence NL	46°59′10″N 55°25′02″W	St. Lawrence municipality (3594)		Upload Photo
Ephraim Jacobs House Municipal Heritage Site	Twillingate NL	49°39′47″N 54°45′36″W	Twillingate municipality (16266)		
Kean's General Store	Brookfield NL	49°08′25″N 53°34′58″W	Newfoundland and Labrador (1994)		Upload Photo
George and Mary Lake House Municipal Heritage Site	Fortune NL	47°04′27″N 55°49′40″W	Fortune municipality (5763)		Upload Photo
Lane House	Tilting NL	49°42′29″N 54°03′55″W	Newfoundland and Labrador (2114)		Upload Photo
Lighttower	Fortune Bay NL	47°28′24″N 55°24′20″W	Federal (3903)		Upload Photo
Lighttower	Little Denier Island; Salvage NL	48°41′09″N 53°35′22″W	Federal (3977)		Upload Photo
Lighttower	Bacalhao Island; Bacalhao Island NL	49°41′20″N 54°33′42″W	Federal (3909)		Upload Photo
Long Island Consumers Co-op Store Municipal Heritage Building	Lushes Bight-Beaumont-Beaumont North NL	49°36′50″N 55°40′41″W	Lushes Bight-Beaumont-Beaumont North municipality (7480)		Upload Photo
Long Point Light Station Dwelling Registered Heritage Structure	Crow Head NL	49°41′16″N 54°48′01″W	Newfoundland and Labrador (6407)		
Long Point Lightstation Municipal Heritage Site	Crow Head NL	49°41′16″N 54°48′01″W	Federal (9675, (20836), Crow Head municipality (5994)		
Loveridge House	Twillingate NL	49°39′00″N 54°46′13″W	Newfoundland and Labrador (2627), Twillingate municipality (16268)		Upload Photo
Lucky Strike Deckhead Municipal Heritage Structure	Buchans NL	48°49′24″N 56°51′14″W	Buchans municipality (7310)		Upload Photo
Man-of-War Brook Municipal Heritage Site	Harbour Breton NL	47°28′30″N 55°48′52″W	Harbour Breton municipality (10832)		Upload Photo
Newman and Company Root Cellar Municipal Heritage Site	Harbour Breton NL	47°28′48″N 55°48′07″W	Harbour Breton municipality (15367)		Upload Photo
Newman's Fish Store Register Heritage Structure	Gaultois NL	47°36′23″N 55°54′10″W	Newfoundland and Labrador (19609)		Upload Photo
Newman's Flagpole Rock Municipal Heritage Site	Harbour Breton NL	47°29′N 55°48′W	Harbour Breton municipality (13795)		Upload Photo
Old Catholic Cemetery Municipal Heritage Site	Leading Tickles NL	49°29′41″N 55°27′26″W	Leading Tickles municipality (8008)		Upload Photo
Old Church of England Cemetery Municipal Heritage Site	Leading Tickes NL	49°30′13″N 55°27′29″W	Leading Tickes municipality (8006)		Upload Photo
Old House Cove General Cemetery Municipal Heritage Site	Twillingate NL	49°38′56″N 54°46′30″W	Twillingate municipality (16269)		
Old Lumsden North (Cat Harbour) Cemetery Municipal Heritage Site	Off Lumsden North Road; Lumsden NL	49°18′26″N 53°36′48″W	Lumsden municipality (19794)		Upload Photo
Old Methodist Cemetery Municipal Heritage Site	Leading Tickles NL	49°30′05″N 55°28′13″W	Leading Tickles municipality (8007)		Upload Photo
Old Schoolhouse Municipal Heritage Building	Fogo NL	49°42′54″N 54°16′58″W	Fogo municipality (10195)		Upload Photo
Pelley House Registered Heritage Structure	Boyd's Cove NL	49°26′51″N 54°39′29″W	Newfoundland and Labrador (19037)		Upload Photo
Pickersgill Premises Registered Heritage Structure	Salvage NL	48°41′00″N 53°38′00″W	Newfoundland and Labrador (2334)		Upload Photo
Piercey House Municipal Heritage Site	Milltown-Head of Bay D'Espoir NL	47°54′54″N 55°45′03″W	Milltown-Head of Bay D'Espoir municipality (13798)		Upload Photo
Red Head Municipal Heritage Site	Harbour Breton NL	47°27′32″N 55°49′55″W	Harbour Breton municipality (15366)		Upload Photo
Reddy Property Municipal Heritage Site	Marystown NL	47°09′31″N 55°09′45″W	Marystown municipality (5380)		Upload Photo
Rocky Point Light Tower Municipal Heritage Site	Harbour Breton NL	47°28′44″N 55°47′38″W	Federal (21114), Harbour Breton municipality (13796)		Upload Photo
John Rodway Senior Residence	Baine Harbour NL	47°21′37″N 54°53′19″W	Newfoundland and Labrador (2628)		Upload Photo
Rose Blanche Lighthouse	Rose Blanche NL	47°37′00″N 58°41′00″W	Newfoundland and Labrador (2095)		More images
St. Andrew's Anglican Church and Cemetery Municipal Heritage Site	Fogo NL	49°42′54″N 54°16′48″W	Fogo municipality (8143)		More images
St. Anne's Church	Little Fogo Island NL	49°48′42″N 54°07′15″W	Newfoundland and Labrador (2092)		More images
St. Bartholomew's Memorial Stone Municipal Heritage Site	Harbour Breton NL	47°28′48″N 55°48′50″W	Harbour Breton municipality (13797)		Upload Photo
St. Cecilia Roman Catholic Cemetery Municipal Heritage Site	St. Lawrence NL	46°55′33″N 55°23′32″W	St. Lawrence municipality (8581)		Upload Photo
St. Gabriel's Hall Municipal Heritage Building	Marystown NL	47°09′40″N 55°09′43″W	Marystown municipality (7277)		Upload Photo
St. John Lodge Society of United Fishermen No. 11 Municipal Heritage Building	Joe Batt's Arm-Barr'd Islands-Shoal Bay NL	49°43′31″N 54°10′44″W	Joe Batt's Arm-Barr'd Islands-Shoal Bay municipality (10196)		Upload Photo
St. Lawrence Centennial Soccer Field	St. Lawrence NL	46°55′21″N 55°23′38″W	St. Lawrence municipality (3554)		Upload Photo
St. Mark's Church	Nippers Harbour NL	49°47′03″N 55°52′01″W	Newfoundland and Labrador (2109)		Upload Photo
St. Matthew's Anglican Cemetery Municipal Heritage Site	St. Lawrence NL	46°55′30″N 55°23′28″W	St. Lawrence municipality (8580)		Upload Photo
St. Matthew's Presbyterian Church	Grand Falls-Windsor NL	48°55′52″N 55°39′34″W	Grand Falls-Windsor municipality (5022)		More images
St. Peter's Anglican Cemetery Municipal Heritage Site	Twillingate NL	49°39′17″N 54°46′42″W	Twillingate municipality (16270)		Upload Photo
St. Peter's Anglican Church	Twillingate NL	49°39′22″N 54°46′33″W	Newfoundland and Labrador (1902), Twillingate municipality (19064)		More images
St. Peter's Lodge SUF #12, Victoria Hall, Registered Heritage Structure	Twillingate NL	49°38′59″N 54°46′20″W	Newfoundland and Labrador (5342), Twillingate municipality (18908)		More images
South Side United Church Municipal Heritage Building	Twillingate NL	49°39′10″N 54°45′39″W	Twillingate municipality (7279)		More images
Stoodley Fishing Stage	Grand Bank NL	47°05′58″N 55°45′10″W	Newfoundland and Labrador (2026), Grand Bank municipality (7462)		Upload Photo
Sunny Cottage Registered Heritage Structure	Harbour Breton NL	47°28′36″N 55°49′34″W	Newfoundland and Labrador (1937), Harbour Breton municipality (11950)		Upload Photo
Emma and Philip Templeman Property Registered Heritage Structure	New-Wes-Valley NL	49°12′15″N 53°30′58″W	Newfoundland and Labrador (6297)		Upload Photo
The Thorndyke	Grand Bank NL	47°06′03″N 55°45′14″W	Newfoundland and Labrador (2196), Grand Bank municipality (7463)		Upload Photo
Tilting Registered Heritage District	Tilting NL	49°42′29″N 54°03′55″W	Federal (13153), Newfoundland and Labrador (2731)		Upload Photo
Torraville Property	Change Islands NL	49°40′18″N 54°24′27″W	Newfoundland and Labrador (2192)		Upload Photo
Truth Loyal Orange Lodge LOL #116	Herring Neck NL	49°38′50″N 54°45′43″W	Newfoundland and Labrador (2203)		More images
USS Truxtun and USS Pollux Historic Wreck Sites	St. Lawrence NL	46°52′38″N 55°25′42″W	St. Lawrence municipality (3436)		Upload Photo
Twillingate Masonic Temple	Twillingate NL	49°38′47″N 54°46′03″W	Newfoundland and Labrador (2172), Twillingate municipality (16271)		More images
Victoria Hall Masonic Lodge #1378 Municipal Heritage Site	Fortune NL	47°04′25″N 55°49′35″W	Fortune municipality (5963)		Upload Photo
West Point Light Tower	West Point Lightstation; Francois, West Point NL	47°33′43″N 56°44′04″W	Federal (12954)		Upload Photo
Jenkins House	232 Durrel Street; Twillingate Invalid	49°40′05″N 54°43′44″W	Invalid (19412), Twillingate municipality (19446)	Q51324585	Upload Photo
Lighttower	Gull Island NL	49°59′54″N 55°21′33″W	Federal (3906)		Upload Photo

== See also ==
- List of historic places in Newfoundland and Labrador
- List of National Historic Sites of Canada in Newfoundland and Labrador
