= Perlican =

Perlican may refer to:

- New Perlican, Newfoundland and Labrador, Canada
- Old Perlican, Newfoundland and Labrador
