= List of historic places in western Newfoundland =

This article is a list of historic places in western Newfoundland. These properties are entered on the Canadian Register of Historic Places, whether they are federal, provincial, or municipal. The list contains entries from communities in census divisions 4, 5, and 9, encompassing the western portions of the island of Newfoundland.

== List of historic places ==
Name	Address	Coordinates	Government recognition (CRHP №)	Wikidata ID	Image
Adams Home	Cape Onion NL	51°36′36″N 55°37′31″W	Newfoundland and Labrador (1895)		
Bank of Montreal	322 Curling Street; Corner Brook NL	48°57′30″N 57°59′41″W	Newfoundland and Labrador (2340)		Upload Photo
Nurse Myra Bennett House Registered Heritage Structure	Daniel's Harbour NL	50°14′00″N 57°35′00″W	Newfoundland and Labrador (2186)		
Blanchard House	Woody Point NL	49°30′17″N 57°54′54″W	Newfoundland and Labrador (19590), Woody Point municipality (4036)		
Bond Store	Woody Point NL	49°30′17″N 57°54′47″W	Woody Point municipality (4048)		
Bonne Bay Cottage Hospital Municipal Heritage Building	Norris Point NL	49°32′18″N 57°52′57″W	Norris Point municipality (5262)		
Walter F. Butt House	Woody Point NL	49°30′07″N 57°54′58″W	Woody Point municipality (4050)		
John William Caines House Registered Heritage Structure	Norris Point NL	49°31′06″N 57°52′39″W	Newfoundland and Labrador (18906)		Upload Photo
Casey Store	Conche NL	50°53′39″N 55°53′53″W	Newfoundland and Labrador (2034), Conche municipality (11947)		Upload Photo
Captain Coubelongue Grave Site Municipal Heritage Site	Conche NL	50°54′08″N 55°53′19″W	Conche municipality (11945)		Upload Photo
Cape Anguille Lightkeeper's Residence	Codroy NL	47°54′00″N 59°24′39″W	Newfoundland and Labrador (2090)		
Cape Anguille Light Tower	Codroy NL	47°53′54″N 59°24′39″W	Federal (13089, (20853)		
Cape Bauld Light Tower	Quirpon Island NL	51°38′21″N 55°25′42″W	Federal (13014)		Upload Photo
067 Central Street	67 Central Street; Corner Brook NL	48°57′05″N 57°55′58″W	Newfoundland and Labrador (2341)		
Corner Brook Public Building	Corner Brook NL	48°57′10″N 57°56′41″W	Newfoundland and Labrador (2342)		
Cow Head Light	Cow Head NL	49°55′11″N 57°48′49″W	Cow Head municipality (3840)		
George and Jane Crocker House	Woody Point NL	49°30′02″N 57°54′50″W	Woody Point municipality (4040)		
Jacob A. Crocker House	Trout River NL	49°28′51″N 58°07′40″W	Newfoundland and Labrador (2176)		
East Side Interdenominational Cemetery Municipal Heritage Site	St. Anthony NL	51°21′50″N 55°34′08″W	St. Anthony municipality (10191)		
Stanley Ford Home and Outbuildings Municipal Heritage Site	Jackson's Arm NL	49°51′56″N 56°47′45″W	Jackson's Arm municipality (5381)		Upload Photo
Glynmill Inn Registered Heritage Structure	Corner Brook NL	48°56′56″N 57°56′23″W	Newfoundland and Labrador (8579)		
Gravesite of Cow Head's First Settlers	Cow Head NL	49°55′21″N 57°48′29″W	Cow Head municipality (4033)		Upload Photo
Grenfell House	St. Anthony NL	51°22′00″N 55°35′00″W	Newfoundland and Labrador (2324)		
The Grenfell Plaques Municipal Heritage Site	on the grounds of the Grenfell House Museum; St. Anthony NL	51°21′59″N 55°35′00″W	St. Anthony municipality (10171)		
Haliburton House	53 Water Street; Woody Point NL	49°30′13″N 57°54′46″W	Woody Point municipality (4049)		Upload Photo
Hezikiah House	Woody Point NL	49°30′02″N 57°55′09″W	Newfoundland and Labrador (2300)		
Holy Trinity Anglican Church Registered Heritage Structure	Codroy NL	47°51′19″N 59°16′13″W	Newfoundland and Labrador (1947)		
Hulan House	Jeffrey's NL	48°14′00″N 58°50′42″W	Newfoundland and Labrador (2091)		Upload Photo
International Pulp and Paper Company Staff House	Deer Lake NL	49°10′14″N 57°25′57″W	Newfoundland and Labrador (2181)		
Jenniex House Municipal Heritage Building	Norris Point NL	49°31′28″N 57°53′06″W	Norris Point municipality (8142)		
Keeper's Dwelling	Belle Isle NL	51°52′58″N 55°23′10″W	Federal (3629)		Upload Photo
L'Anse aux Meadows National Historic Site of Canada	11 km north of Saint-Luniare; St. Anthony NL	51°35′54″N 55°33′42″W	Federal (4219)		
Lighttower	Belle Isle NL	51°52′59″N 55°23′04″W	Federal (3904)		Upload Photo
New Férolle Peninsula Lighthouse	Ferolle Point; New Ferolle NL	51°01′14″N 57°05′37″W	Federal (3619, (20800)		
Lobster Cove Head Lighthouse	Main Street North; Rocky Point NL	49°36′10″N 57°57′20″W	Federal (4813)		More images
Lord Nelson Loyal Orange Lodge LOL #149	Woody Point, Bonne Bay NL	49°30′10″N 57°55′03″W	Newfoundland and Labrador (2177)		
Belle Isle South End Lower Lighthouse	Belle Isle NL	51°52′58″N 55°23′10″W	Federal (3628, (21136)		Upload Photo
Lourdes Land Settlement Site Municipal Heritage Site	Lourdes NL	48°38′54″N 58°59′50″W	Lourdes municipality (8009)		
Martinique Bay Provincial Historic Site	Conche NL	50°54′03″N 55°53′59″W	Newfoundland and Labrador (3083)		Upload Photo
Arnold Morris House	St. George's NL	48°26′00″N 58°28′49″W	Newfoundland and Labrador (2281)		Upload Photo
Old Anglican Cemetery Municipal Heritage Site	Anchor Point NL	51°14′05″N 56°47′58″W	Anchor Point municipality (8060)		More images
Old Anglican Cemetery Municipal Heritage Site	St. Paul's NL	49°51′26″N 57°49′11″W	St. Paul's municipality (12917)		Upload Photo
Old Anglican Cemetery	Cow Head NL	49°55′16″N 57°48′24″W	Cow Head municipality (4034)		
Old Church of England Cemetery Municipal Heritage Site	023C North Street, northwest of the Roman Catholic Church; Parson's Pond NL	50°02′08″N 57°42′27″W	Parson's Pond municipality (8333)		Upload Photo
Old Anglican Cemetery	14 Shore Road; Woody Point NL	49°30′00″N 57°54′59″W	Woody Point municipality (4035)		Upload Photo
Old Loft Restaurant/Jersey Room Crafts	Woody Point NL	49°30′02″N 57°54′49″W	Woody Point municipality (4032)		
Old Roman Catholic Cemetery Municipal Heritage Site	St. Pauls NL	49°51′24″N 57°49′10″W	St. Pauls municipality (12920)		Upload Photo
William and Cecilia O'Neill Property	Conche NL	50°53′36″N 55°53′55″W	Newfoundland and Labrador (2183), Conche municipality (11946)		Upload Photo
Our Lady of Mercy Church Registered Heritage Structure	Port au Port NL	48°33′00″N 58°46′00″W	Newfoundland and Labrador (2280)		
Dr. Henry N. Payne Community Museum	Cow Head NL	49°54′47″N 57°47′41″W	Cow Head municipality (3841)		
1942 Plane Crash Municipal Heritage Site	Conche NL	50°52′58″N 55°53′35″W	Conche municipality (11949)		Upload Photo
Port au Choix National Historic Site of Canada	Port au Choix NL	50°42′32″N 57°22′47″W	Federal (11464)		
Prebble House	Woody Point NL	49°30′07″N 57°54′49″W	Woody Point municipality (4051)		
Precious Blood Church and Bell House	St. Andrew's NL	47°46′35″N 59°16′48″W	Newfoundland and Labrador (2238)		
William Henry Pynn House	Quirpon NL	51°34′49″N 55°26′00″W	Newfoundland and Labrador (2094)		Upload Photo
The Quidnock Municipal Heritage Site	Conche NL	50°53′01″N 55°53′48″W	Conche municipality (11948)		Upload Photo
Quirpon Island Lightkeeper's Residence	Cape Bauld NL	51°38′24″N 55°25′40″W	Newfoundland and Labrador (3182)		Upload Photo
Roberts Store	Woody Point NL	49°30′11″N 57°54′47″W	Woody Point municipality (4037)		
Edward J. Roberts House	Woody Point NL	49°30′09″N 57°54′48″W	Woody Point municipality (4052)		
John William Roberts House	Woody Point NL	49°30′12″N 57°54′51″W	Newfoundland and Labrador (2190)		
St. Barnabas Anglican Church	Flower's Cove NL	51°17′48″N 56°44′01″W	Newfoundland and Labrador (2105)		
St. George's Courthouse Registered Heritage Structure	St. George's NL	48°26′00″N 58°28′49″W	Newfoundland and Labrador (2111)		
St. Joseph's Roman Catholic Church	St. George's NL	48°26′00″N 58°28′49″W	Newfoundland and Labrador (2241)		
St. Patrick's Church	Woody Point, Bonne Bay NL	49°29′59″N 57°55′13″W	Newfoundland and Labrador (2180)		
Julius Swirsky Clothing Store Registered Heritage Structure	Corner Brook NL	48°57′06″N 57°57′05″W	Newfoundland and Labrador (10843)		
Tower	Port au Choix NL	50°41′53″N 57°24′39″W	Federal (9731)		
Upper Light Recognized Federal Heritage Building	Belle Isle NL	51°52′58″N 55°23′10″W	Federal (3905)		Upload Photo
War Memorial Municipal Heritage Structure	St. Anthony NL	51°21′39″N 55°34′54″W	St. Anthony municipality (8334)		
Wicks Store Municipal Heritage Site	Jackson's Arm NL	49°51′54″N 56°46′23″W	Jackson's Arm municipality (5870)		Upload Photo
Woody Point Lighthouse	Water Street; Woody Point NL	49°51′54″N 56°46′23″W	Federal (21115)		

== See also ==
- List of historic places in Newfoundland and Labrador
- List of National Historic Sites of Canada in Newfoundland and Labrador
