= Historic Resources Act (Newfoundland and Labrador) =

Canadian provincial statute

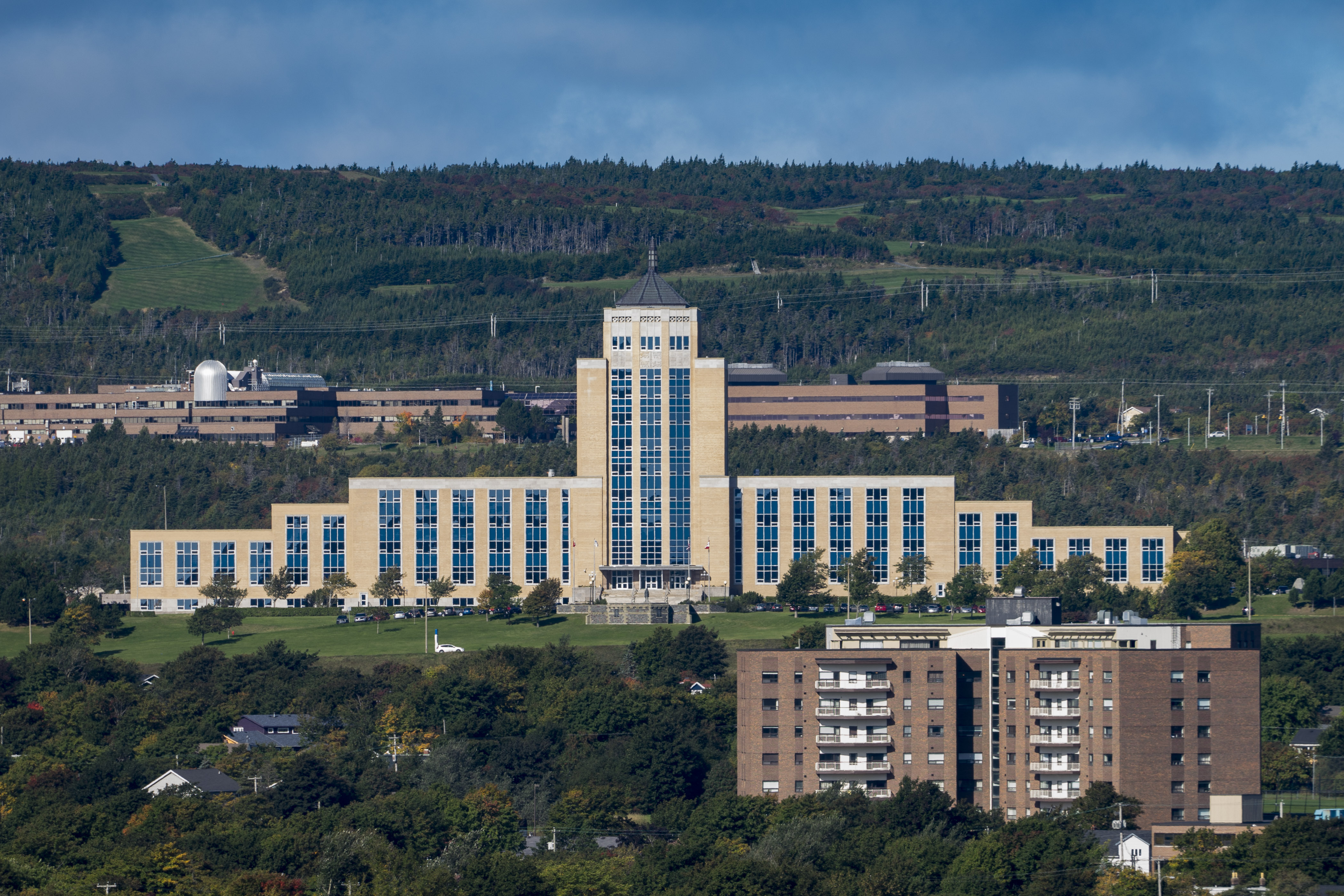
- Photo of Confederation Building, location of the Newfoundland and Labrador House of Assembly

Newfoundland and Labrador House of Assembly
- Long title: An Act Respecting the Preservation of the Historic Resources of the Province
- Citation: RSN1990 cR-8 s44; 1993 cD-19.1 s21; 2001 c31; 2001 cN-3.1 s2; 2004 cL-3.1 s39; 2005 cR-15.1 s38; 2007 c17; 2008 c59 s18; 2016 cR-15.2 s31 (not in force-not included): 2019 c4 s1
- Territorial extent: Newfoundland and Labrador
- Enacted by: Newfoundland and Labrador House of Assembly
- Enacted: 1990

The Historic Resources Act (the Act) is a provincial statute which allows for the identification, protection and rehabilitation of archaeological, palaeontological, and cultural heritage sites in the province of Newfoundland and Labrador, Canada.

The Act is divided into five (5) parts:

1. Administration, setting out limitations, the duties of the Minister, and the acquisition and use of funds for the purposes of the Act;
2. Historic and Palaeontological Resources, pertaining to archaeological and palaeontological investigation, regulating development of sensitive sites, and vesting title to uncovered artifacts and fossils in the Crown;
3. Historic Sites, establishing a provincial registry and respecting the recognition and acquisition of provincial historic sites, palaeontologically significant sites, and provincial cultural resources;
4. Heritage Foundation, pertaining to the establishment of the Heritage Foundation of Newfoundland and Labrador as a Crown corporation and its powers to recognize provincial registered heritage structures and registered heritage districts; and
5. General, enabling the registration of conservation easements, the creation of regulations pursuant to the act, enforcement, and offences under the Act.

The Historic Resources Act was enacted in 1990 replacing a previous act, An Act Respecting The Preservation Of The Historic Resources Of The Province (Historic Resources Act), enacted in 1985.

== See also ==
- Heritage conservation in Canada
- List of historic places in Newfoundland and Labrador
- List of National Historic Sites of Canada in Newfoundland and Labrador
