= Ridley Hall, Newfoundland and Labrador =

Coordinates: 47.692826°N 53.214543°W

Ridley Hall is the site of a circa 1834 stone residence located on Water Street, Harbour Grace, Newfoundland and Labrador. The building, which received heritage designation in 1994, remained vacant for many years and in 2003 it was almost completely destroyed by fire. As of 2024, it survived as a ruin.

== Construction ==
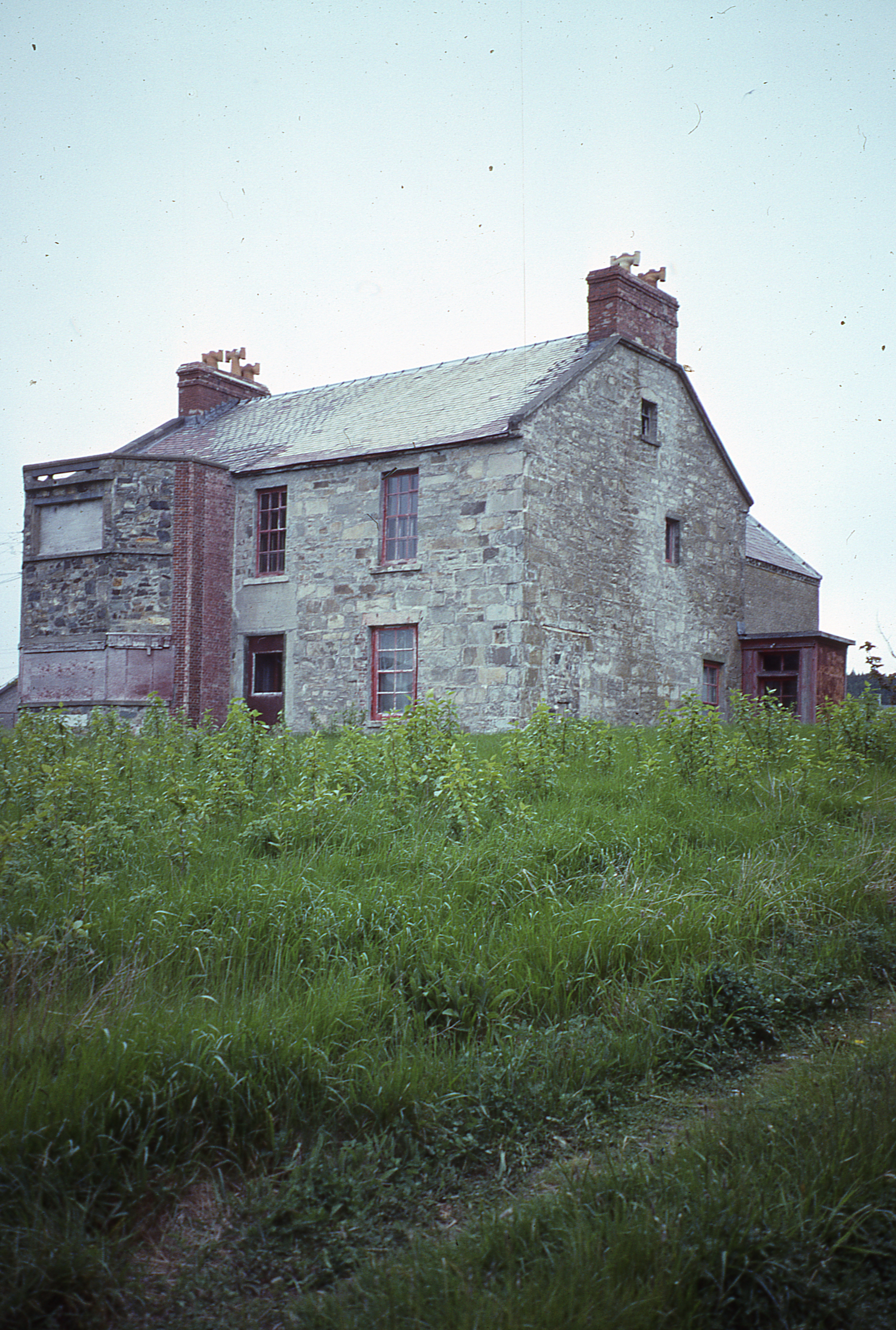
Ridley Hall, Harbour Grace, circa July 1993.

Built for merchant Thomas Ridley (Sr.) in 1834, Ridley Hall was erected as a two-storey house on a T-shaped foundation with a truncated gable roof with end chimneys. Its stone walls were built of locally quarried bluestone, with some imported sandstone. Sometime after its initial construction, probably in the 1850s, a two-story frontal bay and a rear ballroom (the doors of which led to the gardens) were added. In 1863, a heavy stone wall was built around the property.

In 1992, the building was described as being "In all likelihood, the finest surviving stone house in Newfoundland. Even in its tragically derelict condition, its sheer size and presence still command attention."

== Early use ==
Complete with a grand ballroom and lush English gardens, Ridley Hall became a social haven for Harbour Grace elite, and schooners were known to salute the hall as they passed through the harbour. Elaborate parties were hosted on the grounds:

Accounts of its past glory include stories of visits during the 19th century from various people of esteemed rank, including the Prince of Wales as well as members of other royal families from Spain, Portugal and the British Isles.

One particular ball held by Thomas Harrison Ridley on Friday, August 10, 1855, was said to be the “certainly in every respect the most brilliant entertainment that has ever taken place in Newfoundland.” In 1866, following the successful laying of the Trans-Atlantic cable, Daniel Gooch wrote in his diary:

Mr Ridley of Harbour Grace gave us a grand ball at his home. He put up a large timber ball room and did the thing exceedingly well. I dined and slept at his house. The road to reach this place from Heart’s Content was an awful one, the distance about 16 miles and time about 4 hours. He sent his carriage for us, or as many as it would hold. I fancied I never saw so many good-looking women in a room together before.

The home changed hands several times throughout the late 19th and 20th century.

Ridley and Sons declared insolvency in 1873, and in late 1876 the Ridley Hall property was advertised for sale. John Munn and Company subsequently purchased the building. The house later became the property of Edward Quinton, who, in the early 1900s, sold it to John Maddock, an English-born businessman who operated a general cash and supply business in Harbour Grace. Dr. C. Alfred Ames purchased the property to use as a clinic circa June 1905.

== Cable office ==
The building served for a time as a telegraphic cable station. The station was set up in 1904 and was connected by direct cable links to Bay Roberts in 1914, Ireland in 1928, and the Azores in 1928, operating with some interruptions and changes of ownership until 1953. A piece of the transatlantic cable is in the collections of the Conception Bay Museum.

== Designation and fire ==
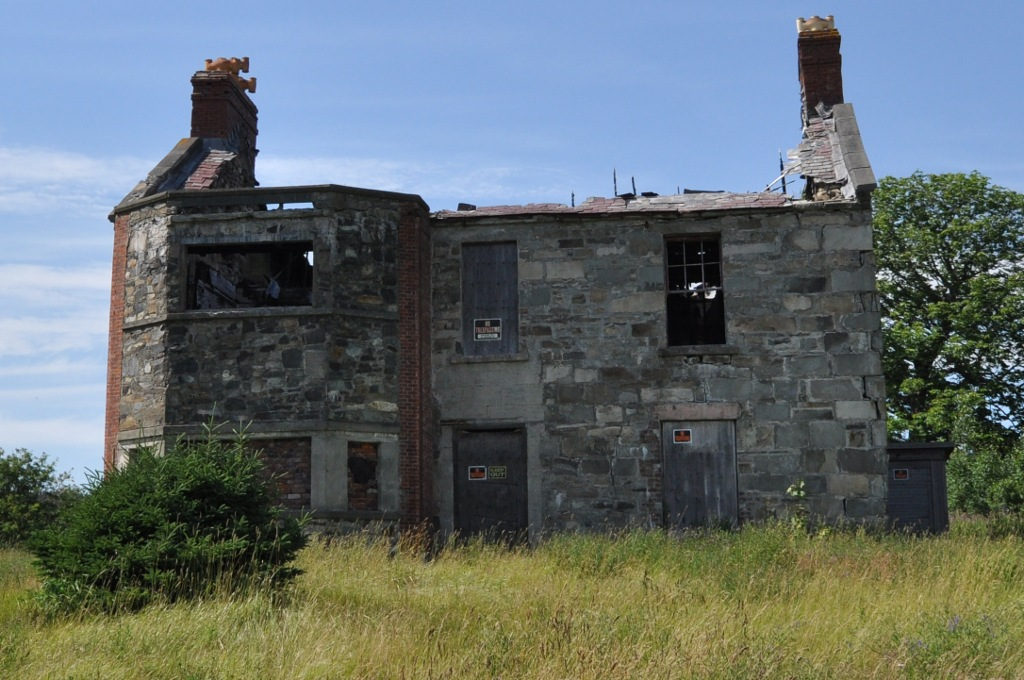
View of Ridley Hall ruins in 2013.

Ridley Hall escaped three major fires in 1832, 1858, and 1944. Ridley Hall was used again as a private residence by the Archibald family from 1954 until the 1980s when it became vacant. It was designated a Registered Heritage Structure by the Heritage Foundation of Newfoundland and Labrador in 1994 for its historic and aesthetic value. The structure was due to undergo substantial renovations in the 1990s, but a fire in November 2003 gutted the historic structure, causing the slate roof to crumble; another fire in early April caused more damage to the building. In the summer of 2011, the Town of Harbour Grace informed owners Brian and Jean Flanagan they had 30 days to either fix the building up or tear it down. In 2012, the Town of Harbour Grace gave permission for the demolition of Ridley Hall, allowing any prospective owners 90 days to tear down the structure and clear the property before rebuilding, prompting letters to the editor in support of preservation. The building was placed on the Newfoundland Historic Trust's "Buildings at Risk 2012" list.

In December 2015, the town council unanimously voted to rescind a motion to demolish the ruins. In 2019, it was suggested that the ruins could be stabilized and used as a venue for weddings, performances, interpretation, and other community activities.

== Local folklore ==
Over the years a number of legends have attached themselves to the building:

- The home contained a secret dungeon under the dining room floor, complete with a spy hole at eye level, said to be used for storing contraband and harbouring renegades;
- An apocryphal story says a former King of Spain attended a ball at Ridley Hall.
