= List of historic places in St. John's, Newfoundland and Labrador =

This article is a list of historic places in St. John's, Newfoundland and Labrador entered on the Canadian Register of Historic Places, whether they are federal, provincial, or municipal.

== List of historic places ==
Name	Address	Coordinates	Government recognition (CRHP №)	Wikidata ID	Image
Anderson House	42 Powers Court; St. John's NL	47°34′22″N 52°41′48″W	Newfoundland and Labrador (2242)		
Angel House Registered Heritage Structure	146 Hamilton Avenue; St. John's NL	47°33′13″N 52°43′17″W	Newfoundland and Labrador (2333), St. John's municipality (6127)		
Anglican Cathedral Parish House	9 Cathedral Street; St. John's NL	47°33′57″N 52°42′31″W	St. John's municipality (2429)		Upload Photo
Apothecary Hall	488 Water Street; St. John's NL	47°33′22″N 52°42′51″W	Newfoundland and Labrador (2304)		
Bannerman House	54 Circular Road; St. John's NL	47°34′23″N 52°42′36″W	Newfoundland and Labrador (2618), St. John's municipality (8062)		
008 Barnes Road	8 Barnes Road; St. John's NL	47°34′07″N 52°42′34″W	St. John's municipality (5468)		Upload Photo
010 Barnes Road	10 Barnes Road; St. John's NL	47°34′07″N 52°42′34″W	St. John's municipality (3298)		Upload Photo
Bartra	28 Circular Road; St. John's NL	47°34′26″N 52°42′26″W	Newfoundland and Labrador (2711), St. John's municipality (10390)		
Basilica of St. John the Baptist National Historic Site of Canada	172 Military Road; St. John's NL	47°34′02″N 52°42′33″W	Federal (4139), Newfoundland and Labrador (3056), St. John's municipality (10491)		
Basilica Cathedral of St. John the Baptist Entrance Archway Municipal Heritage Building	200 Military Road; St. John's NL	47°34′02″N 52°42′34″W	St. John's municipality (5867)		
Benevolent Irish Society (BIS) Building	48 Queen's Road; St. John's NL	47°34′01″N 52°42′34″W	Newfoundland and Labrador (3303)		
Bishop Feild College	46 Bond Street; St. John's NL	47°35′39″N 52°42′22″W	Newfoundland and Labrador (2243), St. John's municipality (5272)		
Bishop's Library	Bonaventure Avenue, between the Bishop's Palace and The Monastery; St. John's NL	47°34′02″N 52°42′44″W	Newfoundland and Labrador (2188)		
Bishop's Palace	Bonaventure Avenue; St. John's NL	47°34′03″N 52°42′44″W	Newfoundland and Labrador (2289)		
Building 202	Former Pepperrell AFB; St. John's NL	47°34′56″N 52°41′45″W	Federal (11364)		Upload Photo
Building 204	Former Pepperrell AFB; St. John's NL	47°34′58″N 52°41′39″W	Federal (11365)		Upload Photo
Building 205	Former Pepperrell AFB; St. John's NL	47°35′06″N 52°41′39″W	Federal (11437)		Upload Photo
Building 206	Former Pepperrell AFB; St. John's NL	47°35′00″N 52°41′44″W	Federal (11438)		Upload Photo
Building 207	Former Pepperrell AFB; St. John's NL	47°35′00″N 52°41′39″W	Federal (11439)		Upload Photo
Building 308	Former Pepperrell AFB; St. John's NL	47°35′06″N 52°41′39″W	Federal (7451)		
Building 309	Former Pepperrell AFB; St. John's NL	47°35′06″N 52°41′39″W	Federal (7452)		
Building 311	Former Pepperrell AFB; St. John's NL	47°35′06″N 52°41′54″W	Federal (11443)		
Building 312	Former Pepperrell AFB; St. John's NL	47°35′06″N 52°41′50″W	Federal (11445)		
Building 313	Former Pepperrell AFB; St. John's NL	47°35′05″N 52°41′58″W	Federal (11446)		
Building 314	Former Pepperrell AFB; St. John's NL	47°35′06″N 52°41′39″W	Federal (11448)		
Building 401	Former Pepperrell AFB; St. John's NL	47°35′07″N 52°41′46″W	Federal (11366)		
Building 402	Former Pepperrell AFB; St. John's NL	47°35′07″N 52°41′46″W	Federal (11368)		
Building 403	Former Pepperrell AFB; St. John's NL	47°35′09″N 52°41′47″W	Federal (11373)		
Building 404	Former Pepperrell AFB; St. John's NL	47°35′09″N 52°41′48″W	Federal (11376)		
Building 405	Former Pepperrell AFB; St. John's NL	47°35′07″N 52°41′48″W	Federal (11378)		
Building 406	Former Pepperrell AFB; St. John's NL	47°35′08″N 52°41′50″W	Federal (11380)		
Building 407	Former Pepperrell AFB; St. John's NL	47°35′06″N 52°41′39″W	Federal (7492)		
Building 408	Former Pepperrell AFB; St. John's NL	47°35′06″N 52°41′39″W	Federal (7493)		
Building 409	Former Pepperrell AFB; St. John's NL	47°35′10″N 52°41′52″W	Federal (11423)		
Building 410	Former Pepperrell AFB; St. John's NL	47°35′09″N 52°41′54″W	Federal (11426)		
Building 501	Former Pepperrell AFB; St. John's NL	47°35′06″N 52°41′44″W	Federal (11427)		Upload Photo
Building 507	Former Pepperrell AFB; St. John's NL	47°35′10″N 52°41′42″W	Federal (11431)		Upload Photo
Building 508	Former Pepperrell AFB; St. John's NL	47°35′09″N 52°41′42″W	Federal (11432)		Upload Photo
Building 509	Former Pepperrell AFB; St. John's NL	47°35′07″N 52°41′42″W	Federal (11433)		
Building 511	Former Pepperrell AFB; St. John's NL	47°35′09″N 52°41′40″W	Federal (11434)		Upload Photo
Building 512	Former Pepperrell AFB; St. John's NL	47°35′11″N 52°41′40″W	Federal (11436)		Upload Photo
Building 517	Former Pepperrell AFB; St. John's NL	47°35′12″N 52°41′37″W	Federal (11491)		Upload Photo
Building 806	Former Pepperrell AFB; St. John's NL	47°35′12″N 52°41′20″W	Federal (11381)		
Cabot Tower	Signal Hill Road; St. John's NL	47°34′23″N 52°40′58″W	Federal (2974)		
Canada House Municipal Heritage Building	74 Circular Road; St. John's NL	47°34′19″N 52°42′48″W	St. John's municipality (10609)		
Cape Spear Lighthouse	Blackhead Road, Highway 11; St. John's NL	47°31′20″N 52°37′29″W	Federal (2885, (7404), Newfoundland and Labrador (20775)		
Chapel Hill Condominiums	39 Queen's Road; St. John's NL	47°34′03″N 52°42′30″W	St. John's municipality (3302)		
24 Circular Road Municipal Heritage Building	24 Circular Road; St. John's NL	47°34′27″N 52°42′24″W	St. John's municipality (10389)		
Cochrane Street United Church	Cochrane Street; St. John's NL	47°34′10″N 52°42′10″W	Newfoundland and Labrador (3054), St. John's municipality (5346)		
028 Cochrane Street	28 Cochrane Street; St. John's NL	47°34′10″N 52°42′10″W	Newfoundland and Labrador (2278), St. John's municipality (10409)		
Colonial Building	Military Road; St. John's NL	47°34′15″N 52°42′23″W	Newfoundland and Labrador (3063)		
Commercial Cable Company Building	95 Water Street; St. John's NL	47°34′00″N 52°42′14″W	Newfoundland and Labrador (2112)		
Christ Church / Quidi Vidi Church National Historic Site of Canada	100 The Boulevard; St. John's NL	47°34′58″N 52°41′33″W	Federal (11958), Newfoundland and Labrador (5274)		
Church of England Institute CEI Club	corner of Hamilton Avenue and Sudbury Street; St. John's NL	47°33′09″N 52°43′17″W	St. John's municipality (2087)		
034 Circular Road Municipal Heritage Building	34 Circular Road; St. John's NL	47°34′25″N 52°42′29″W	St. John's municipality (5538)		
Commercial Chambers Building	197 Water Street; St. John's NL	47°33′50″N 52°42′25″W	Newfoundland and Labrador (2149)		
Cornerstone Theatre	corner of Queen, George and Water Streets; St. John's NL	47°33′37″N 52°42′43″W	St. John's municipality (2643)		Upload Photo
Crow's Nest Officer's Club	Water Street; St. John's NL	47°34′01″N 52°42′13″W	Federal (18926), Newfoundland and Labrador (2279)		
The Deanery (Anglican Cathedral Parish Rectory)	22 Church Hill; St. John's NL	47°33′57″N 52°42′32″W	St. John's municipality (2613)		
Delgado Building Municipal Heritage Building	169-173 Water Street; St. John's NL	47°33′54″N 52°42′22″W	St. John's municipality (5537)		
Devon House Registered Heritage Structure	59 Duckworth Street; St. John's NL	47°34′14″N 52°41′59″W	Newfoundland and Labrador (2283)		
Devon Place	3 Forest Road; St. John's NL	47°34′20″N 52°42′53″W	Newfoundland and Labrador (3306)		
Devon Row Municipal Heritage Building	1-4 Devon Row (Duckworth Street); St. John's NL	47°34′14″N 52°41′59″W	St. John's municipality (10419)		
261 Duckworth Street	261 Duckworth Street; St. John's NL	47°33′58″N 52°42′21″W	St. John's municipality (2637)		
271-275 Duckworth Street	271-275 Duckworth Street; St. John's NL	47°33′56″N 52°42′22″W	St. John's municipality (2495)		
333 Duckworth Street	333 Duckworth Street; St. John's NL	47°33′50″N 52°42′28″W	St. John's municipality (3426)		
377 Duckworth Street	377 Duckworth Street; St. John's NL	47°33′46″N 52°42′40″W	Newfoundland and Labrador (2284)		
Elizabeth Manor Municipal Heritage Building	21 Military Road; St. John's NL	47°34′16″N 52°42′12″W	St. John's municipality (5542)		
Emmanuel House Municipal Heritage Building	83 Cochrane Street; St. John's NL	47°34′16″N 52°42′16″W	St. John's municipality (6128)		
Forest House	50 Forest Road; St. John's NL	47°34′29″N 52°42′10″W	Newfoundland and Labrador (2305), St. John's municipality (5343)		
Former Bank of British North America National Historic Site of Canada	276 Duckworth Street; St. John's NL	47°33′57″N 52°42′23″W	Federal (12643), Newfoundland and Labrador (2329), St. John's municipality (10478)		
Former Newfoundland Railway Terminus & Headquarters	495 Water Street; St. John's NL	47°33′17″N 52°42′49″W	Federal (6501, (15725)		
Fort Amherst National Historic Site of Canada	Southside Road; St. John's NL	47°33′49″N 52°40′48″W	Federal (12850)		
Fort Townshend National Historic Site of Canada	Bonaventure Avenue and Harvey Roads; St. John's NL	47°33′58″N 52°42′44″W	Federal (14342)		
Fort William National Historic Site of Canada	115 Cavendish Square (plaque); St. John's NL	47°34′15″N 52°42′03″W	Federal (13082)		Upload Photo
George Street United Church Municipal Heritage Building	George Street; St. John's NL	47°33′29″N 52°42′48″W	Newfoundland and Labrador (2315), St. John's municipality (10485)		
Government House National Historic Site of Canada	80 Military Road; St. John's NL	47°34′20″N 52°42′18″W	Federal (13399)		
Gower Street United Church	Queen's Road; St. John's NL	47°33′58″N 52°42′38″W	Newfoundland and Labrador (2285)		
018 Gower Street Municipal Heritage Building	18 Gower Street; St. John's NL	47°34′13″N 52°42′10″W	St. John's municipality (5352)		
020 Gower Street Municipal Heritage Building	20 Gower Street; St. John's NL	47°34′13″N 52°42′10″W	St. John's municipality (5353)		
022 Gower Street Municipal Heritage Building	22 Gower Street; St. John's NL	47°34′13″N 52°42′10″W	St. John's municipality (5354)		
Grace Building, 283-285 Water Street Municipal Heritage Building	283-285 Water Street; St. John's NL	47°33′44″N 52°42′32″W	St. John's municipality (5850)		
Harris Cottage	43 Monkstown Road; St. John's NL	47°34′13″N 52°42′38″W	Newfoundland and Labrador (2286), St. John's municipality (10502)		
Horwood House	718 Water Street; St. John's NL	47°32′57″N 52°43′17″W	Newfoundland and Labrador (2287)		
The House	21 Rennie's Mill Road; St. John's NL	47°34′11″N 52°42′36″W	Newfoundland and Labrador (2624)		
Howard House Municipal Heritage Building	7 Garrison Hill; St. John's NL	47°34′00″N 52°42′33″W	Newfoundland and Labrador (2314), St. John's municipality (10483)		
The Imperial	22 Flavin Street (corner of Bond); St. John's NL	47°34′07″N 52°42′21″W	St. John's municipality (3363)		
Kelvin House and Conservatory Registered Heritage Structure	49 Rennie's Mill Road; St. John's NL	47°34′15″N 52°42′38″W	Newfoundland and Labrador (2619), St. John's municipality (5451)		
King George V Building	93 Water Street, diagonally across from War Memorial; St. John's NL	47°34′01″N 52°42′13″W	St. John's municipality (1134)		
031 King's Bridge Road	31 King's Bridge Road; St. John's NL	47°34′30″N 52°42′12″W	St. John's municipality (3299)		
033 King's Bridge Road	33 King's Bridge Road; St. John's NL	47°34′29″N 52°42′12″W	St. John's municipality (3425)		
035 King's Bridge Road Municipal Heritage Building	35 King's Bridge Road; St. John's NL	47°34′31″N 52°42′12″W	St. John's municipality (5539)		
Kinkora	36 King's Bridge Road; St. John's NL	47°34′30″N 52°42′09″W	St. John's municipality (2638)		
Lakecrest Independent School	58 Patrick Street; St. John's NL	47°33′14″N 52°43′02″W	St. John's municipality (3178)		
The Lea	39 Topsail Road; St. John's NL	47°32′44″N 52°43′25″W	Newfoundland and Labrador (2167)		
Longshoremen's Protective Union (LSPU) Hall	3 Victoria Street; St. John's NL	47°33′58″N 52°42′23″W	Newfoundland and Labrador (2152)		
Majestic Theatre Municipal Heritage Building	390 Duckworth Street; St. John's NL	47°33′45″N 52°42′39″W	St. John's municipality (5536)		
Mallard Cottage	2 Barrows Road; St. John's NL	47°34′19″N 52°41′51″W	Federal (4226), Newfoundland and Labrador (2150), St. John's municipality (10380)		
Martin McNamara House	15 Plank Road; St. John's NL	47°33′14″N 52°42′54″W	Newfoundland and Labrador (2321), St. John's municipality (10506)		Upload Photo
Military Hospital	Forest Road; St. John's NL	47°34′31″N 52°41′40″W	St. John's municipality (2430)		Upload Photo
112 Military Road Municipal Heritage Building	112 Military Road; St. John's NL	47°34′11″N 52°42′27″W	St. John's municipality (2717)		
The Monastery (Old St. Bonaventure's College)	Bonaventure Avenue (attached to Bishop's Library and St. Bonaventure's College); St. John's NL	47°34′03″N 52°42′46″W	Newfoundland and Labrador (2623)		
Monkstown Manor	51 Monkstown Road; St. John's NL	47°34′13″N 52°42′39″W	St. John's municipality (2639)		
007 Monkstown Road	7 Monkstown Road; St. John's NL	47°34′08″N 52°42′32″W	Newfoundland and Labrador (2718), St. John's municipality (10503)		
Mount St. Francis Monastery	Merrymeeting Road; St. John's NL	47°34′02″N 52°42′52″W	Newfoundland and Labrador (2113), St. John's municipality (10490)		
Murray Premises	5 Beck's Cove; St. John's NL	47°33′41″N 52°42′34″W	Federal (12929), St. John's municipality (2232)		
The New House, 335 Southside Road	335 Southside Road; St. John's NL	47°33′04″N 52°42′58″W	Newfoundland and Labrador (2621)		
The New House, 337 Southside Road	337 Southside Road; St. John's NL	47°33′00″N 52°42′58″W	Newfoundland and Labrador (2620)		
Newman Building	1 Springdale Street; St. John's NL	47°33′26″N 52°42′44″W	St. John's municipality (2644)		
Newman Wine Vaults Provincial Historic Site	436 Water Street; St. John's NL	47°33′26″N 52°42′44″W	Newfoundland and Labrador (2153)		
The Observatory Municipal Heritage Building	1 Bonaventure Avenue; St. John's NL	47°34′00″N 52°42′39″W	St. John's municipality (10379)		
O'Donel Memorial Hall	58 Queen's Road and 189 Military Road; St. John's NL	47°34′01″N 52°42′34″W	St. John's municipality (4071)		
O'Dwyer Block	Water Street; St. John's NL	47°33′42″N 52°42′35″W	Newfoundland and Labrador (2154)		
The Old London, New York and Paris Building	179-181 Water Street, corner of Baird's Cove; St. John's NL	47°33′53″N 52°42′22″W	St. John's municipality (2083)		
Oratory of the Sacred Heart, Our Lady of Mercy Convent	Military Road; St. John's NL	47°34′04″N 52°42′39″W	Newfoundland and Labrador (2288)		Upload Photo
Our Lady of Mercy Convent	Military Road; St. John's NL	47°34′05″N 52°42′40″W	Newfoundland and Labrador (2173)		Upload Photo
003 Park Place	3 Park Place; St. John's NL	47°34′13″N 52°42′33″W	Newfoundland and Labrador (3304), St. John's municipality (10504)		
004 Park Place	4 Park Place; St. John's NL	47°34′13″N 52°42′33″W	St. John's municipality (2641)		
Peppercorn House Municipal Heritage Building	25 Monkstown Road; St. John's NL	47°34′10″N 52°42′35″W	St. John's municipality (5543)		
007 Plank Road	7 Plank Road; St. John's NL	47°33′16″N 52°42′54″W	St. John's municipality (3839)		Upload Photo
Pleasantville-Building 223	2231 Legion Street; St. John's NL	47°35′06″N 52°41′39″W	Federal (7590)		
015 Portugal Cove Road	15 Portugal Cove Road; St. John's NL	47°34′35″N 52°42′36″W	St. John's municipality (3179)		Upload Photo
074-076 Prescott Street	74-76 Prescott Street; St. John's NL	47°34′06″N 52°42′26″W	St. John's municipality (3180)		
078 Prescott Street, Neville Framing	78 Prescott Street; St. John's NL	47°34′06″N 52°42′26″W	St. John's municipality (3181)		
Presentation Convent and School	Cathedral Square; St. John's NL	47°34′05″N 52°42′40″W	Newfoundland and Labrador (2290)		
Provincial Museum of Newfoundland and Labrador	285 Duckworth Street; St. John's NL	47°33′54″N 52°42′24″W	St. John's municipality (2331)		
Queen Victoria Wing	Forest Road; St. John's NL	47°34′31″N 52°41′40″W	St. John's municipality (2431)		Upload Photo
30 Queen's Road	30 Queen's Road; St. John's NL	47°34′06″N 52°42′30″W	St. John's municipality (3301)		
32 Queen's Road Municipal Heritage Building	32 Queen's Road; St. John's NL	47°34′05″N 52°42′34″W	St. John's municipality (12063)		
034 Queen's Road	34 Queen's Road; St. John's NL	47°34′05″N 52°42′34″W	Newfoundland and Labrador (2561)		
Quidi Vidi Battery	Cuckhold's Cove Road; St. John's NL	47°34′49″N 52°40′29″W	Newfoundland and Labrador (3061)		
Rennie's Mill Road Historic District National Historic Site of Canada	21-79,12-54 Rennie's Mill Road; St. John's NL	47°34′16″N 52°42′34″W	Federal (10699)		
Retreat Cottage	14 Kenna's Hill; St. John's NL	47°34′45″N 52°42′14″W	Newfoundland and Labrador (2302)		
Richmond Hill	18 Topsail Road; St. John's NL	47°32′49″N 52°43′25″W	St. John's municipality (2719)		
Ruby Church	Main Road; St. John's NL	47°29′08″N 52°46′05″W	Newfoundland and Labrador (2194)		
S.O. Steele Building	100 Water Street; St. John's NL	47°34′02″N 52°42′14″W	Newfoundland and Labrador (2160)		
St. Andrew's Church (The Kirk)	above Queen's Road at Long's Hill; St. John's NL	47°33′56″N 52°42′39″W	Newfoundland and Labrador (2162)		Upload Photo
St. Bonaventure's College (Mullock Hall) Registered Heritage Structure	Bonaventure Avenue; St. John's NL	47°34′03″N 52°42′46″W	Newfoundland and Labrador (2622)		
St. John the Baptist Anglican Cathedral National Historic Site of Canada	18 Church Hill; St. John's NL	47°33′55″N 52°42′31″W	Federal (12663), Newfoundland and Labrador (5113), St. John's municipality (8063)		
St. John's Court House National Historic Site of Canada	194 Water Street; St. John's NL	47°33′50″N 52°42′22″W	Federal (2923), St. John's municipality (2107)		
St. John's Ecclesiastical District	roughly properties on Cathedral Street, Bonaventure Avenue, Church Hill, and adjacent St. John's NL	47°34′05″N 52°42′40″W	St. John's municipality (4039)		
St. John's Masonic Temple	6 Cathedral Street; St. John's NL	47°33′57″N 52°42′27″W	Newfoundland and Labrador (2151), St. John's municipality (5300)		
St. Joseph's Chapel	Blackhead neighborhood St. John's NL	47°31′23″N 52°39′35″W	Newfoundland and Labrador (2163), St. John's municipality (5271)		
St. Michael's Convent, Belvedere	Bonaventure Avenue; St. John's NL	47°34′09″N 52°43′11″W	Newfoundland and Labrador (2157), St. John's municipality (10489)		Upload Photo
St. Michael's Orphanage, Belvedere	Bonaventure Avenue; St. John's NL	47°34′10″N 52°43′08″W	Newfoundland and Labrador (2332), St. John's municipality (10488)		Upload Photo
St. Patrick's Convent and School	15 Convent Square; St. John's NL	47°33′14″N 52°42′59″W	St. John's municipality (2614)		
St. Patrick's Deanery Registered Heritage Structure	6 Patrick Street; St. John's NL	47°33′12″N 52°42′58″W	Newfoundland and Labrador (10849), St. John's municipality (2642)		
St. Patrick's Roman Catholic Church National Historic Site of Canada	40 Patrick Street; St. John's NL	47°33′13″N 52°43′02″W	Federal (12845), Newfoundland and Labrador (2164), St. John's municipality (10505)		
St. Thomas' Church	8 Military Road; St. John's NL	47°34′16″N 52°42′09″W	Newfoundland and Labrador (2166), St. John's municipality (10492)		
St. Thomas Rectory / Commissariat House and Garden National Historic Site of Canada	King's Bridge Road; St. John's NL	47°34′21″N 52°42′09″W	Federal (15612), Newfoundland and Labrador (3062)		
Signal Hill National Historic Site of Canada	Signal Hill Road and the south side of The Narrows; St. John's NL	47°34′21″N 52°40′55″W	Federal (4439)		
Squires Barn and Carriage House	315-317 Mount Scio Road; St. John's NL	47°34′15″N 52°45′35″W	Newfoundland and Labrador (2293), St. John's municipality (8369)		Upload Photo
Star of the Sea Hall Municipal Heritage Building	40 Henry Street; St. John's NL	47°33′48″N 52°42′35″W	St. John's municipality (2082)		Upload Photo
The Stone House	8 Kenna's Hill; St. John's NL	47°34′43″N 52°42′14″W	St. John's municipality (3177)		
Sunnyside Gatehouse Municipal Heritage Building	60 Circular Road; St. John's NL	47°34′21″N 52°42′39″W	St. John's municipality (5453)		
Sunnyside House Registered Heritage Structure	70 Circular Road; St. John's NL	47°34′20″N 52°42′46″W	Newfoundland and Labrador (8061), St. John's municipality (5454)		
Sutherland Place	10-20 King's Bridge Road; St. John's NL	47°34′11″N 52°42′27″W	St. John's municipality (4043)		
Temperance Street Houses Registered Heritage Structure (Four Sisters)	31, 33, 35, and 37 Temperance Street; St. John's NL	47°34′16″N 52°41′52″W	Newfoundland and Labrador (10692), St. John's municipality (12901)		
Thimble Cottage Registered Heritage Structure	150 Oxen Pond Road; St. John's NL	47°33′57″N 52°45′21″W	Newfoundland and Labrador (2625), St. John's municipality (8370)		
Thompson Building	303-305 Water Street; St. John's NL	47°33′42″N 52°42′35″W	Newfoundland and Labrador (2168)		
Tobin Building	214 Duckworth Street; St. John's NL	47°34′03″N 52°42′16″W	Newfoundland and Labrador (2294), St. John's municipality (10420)		
Union Bank Building	287 Duckworth Street; St. John's NL	47°33′54″N 52°42′25″W	St. John's municipality (2515)		
027 Victoria Street	27 Victoria Street; St. John's NL	47°34′00″N 52°42′28″W	St. John's municipality (3364)		
Water Street Historic District National Historic Site of Canada	288-300 and 291-307 Water Street as well as the Murray Premises National Historic Site; St. John's NL	47°33′42″N 52°42′36″W	Federal (7700)		
73, 75 and 77 Water Street Registered Heritage Structure	73, 75, and 77 Water Street; St. John's NL	47°34′04″N 52°42′11″W	Newfoundland and Labrador (10847)		
187-189 Water Street	187-189 Water Street; St. John's NL	47°33′49″N 52°42′25″W	St. John's municipality (2720)		
191 Water Street	191 Water Street; St. John's NL	47°33′50″N 52°42′25″W	St. John's municipality (2721)		
193 Water Street	193 Water Street; St. John's NL	47°33′50″N 52°42′25″W	St. John's municipality (2722)		
201 Water Street Municipal Heritage Building	201 Water Street; St. John's NL	47°33′50″N 52°42′25″W	St. John's municipality (5535)		
203 Water Street Municipal Heritage Building	203 Water Street; St. John's NL	47°33′50″N 52°42′27″W	St. John's municipality (5587)		
205 Water Street Municipal Heritage Building	205 Water Street; St. John's NL	47°33′50″N 52°42′28″W	St. John's municipality (6129)		
226 Water Street Municipal Heritage Building	226 Water Street; St. John's NL	47°33′49″N 52°42′29″W	St. John's municipality (6133)		
562-564 Water Street	562-564 Water Street; St. John's NL	47°33′16″N 52°42′48″W	Newfoundland and Labrador (2295)		
Waterford Hall	185 Waterford Bridge Road; St. John's NL	47°32′06″N 52°44′10″W	Newfoundland and Labrador (2169)		
Wesley United Church	101 Patrick Street; St. John's NL	47°33′16″N 52°43′10″W	St. John's municipality (3300)		
Winterholme National Historic Site of Canada	79 Rennies Mill Road; St. John's NL	47°34′21″N 52°42′37″W	Federal (2914), Newfoundland and Labrador (5093)		
Yellow Belly Corner Municipal Heritage Building	corner of Water Street, Beck's Cove and George Street; St. John's NL	47°33′44″N 52°42′36″W	Newfoundland and Labrador (5341), St. John's municipality (1201)		

== See also ==
- List of historic places on the Avalon Peninsula
- List of historic places in Newfoundland and Labrador
- List of National Historic Sites of Canada in Newfoundland and Labrador
