= Greenspond Courthouse =

Heritage-designated courthouse in Greenspond

Coordinates: 49°04′06″N 53°34′00″W

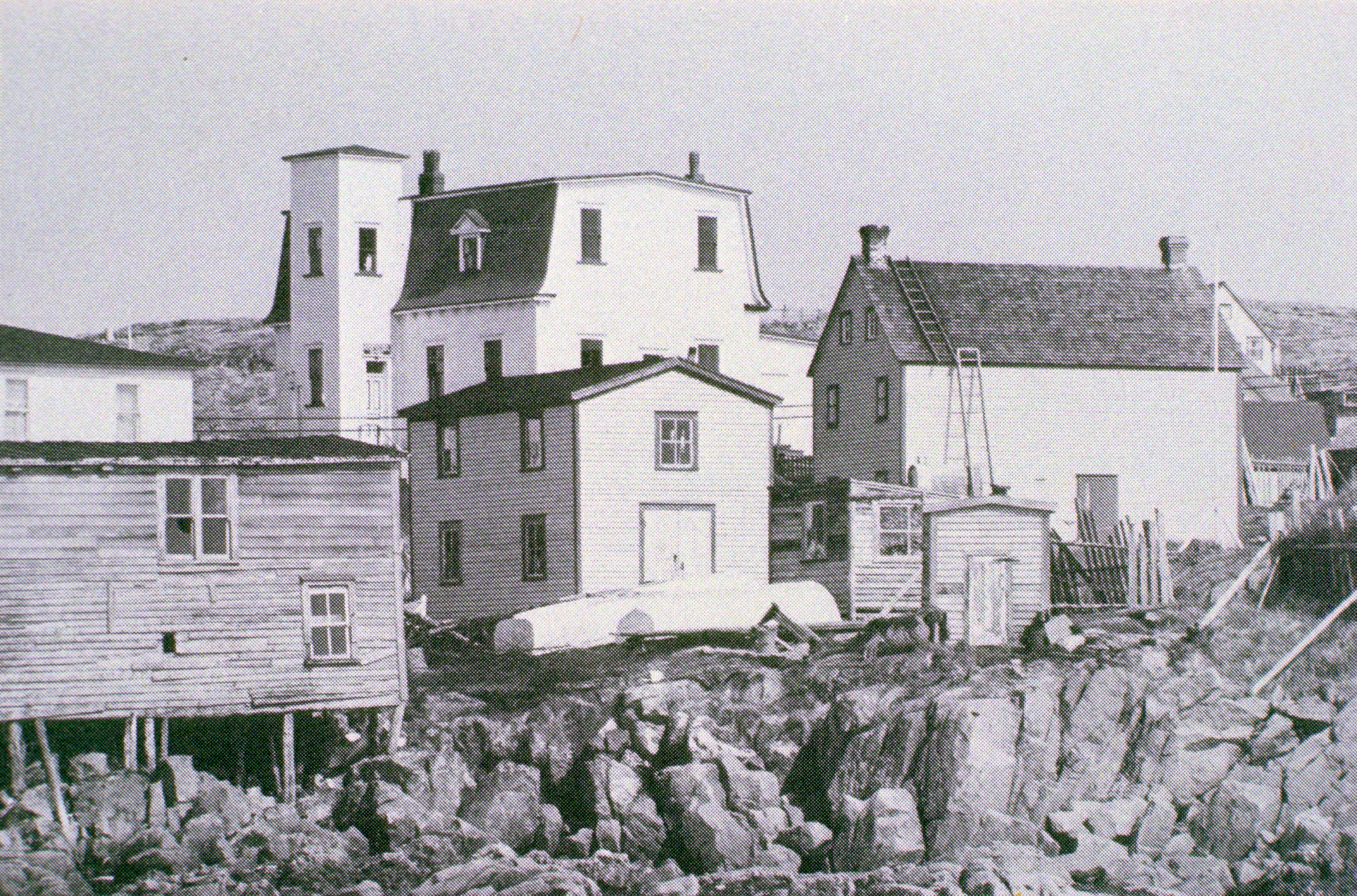
Historic photo of Greenspond, NL, with the Greenspond Courthouse in the background.

Greenspond Courthouse is a wooden two-storey, heritage-designated courthouse built in the Second Empire style in Greenspond, Newfoundland and Labrador. Designed by the architect William Henry Churchill, the courthouse sits atop a hill overlooking Greenspond Harbour and Bonavista Bay. It replaced an earlier courthouse in the community.

== Construction and design ==
The cornerstone was laid in 1899, but construction did not start till August 1900:

The erection of the new Court House and jailor's residence was started at Greenspond last week by Mr. W. Churchill, having gone there for that purpose by train and S.S. Dundee.

The building was designed by architect William Henry Churchill, superintendent of public buildings from 1895 to 1927, who was known for using the Second Empire style in many of his designs. Plans were carried out by the builder J. J. Mifflin. The building is of simple two-storey frame construction, with a mansard roof, dormer windows, and a walk-in tower. It is the smallest of Churchill's standard designs. Work on the building was completed between 1900 and 1901. The domed top of the tower was removed in the 1920s and later restored.

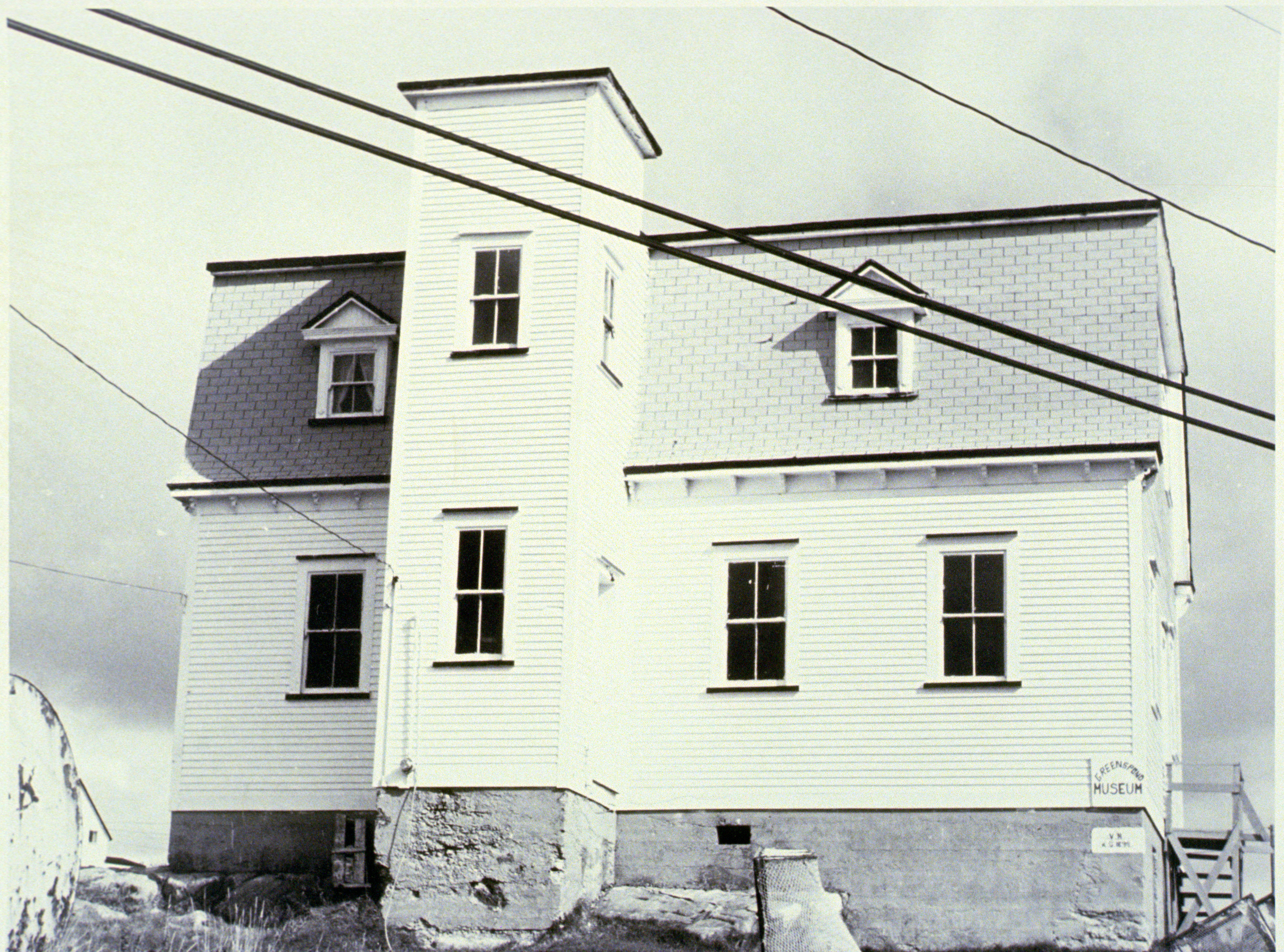
Exterior of the Greenspond Courthouse

The design of the Greenspond Courthouse is similar to other courthouses built on the island of Newfoundland during the same period: Bonavista, built in 1897; Bell Island, built in 1900 and torn down in 1970; Placentia, built in 1902; Trinity, 1903; St. George's, 1903; Bay Roberts, built in 1903 and torn down in the 1960s; and Burin, 1905. The majority of these structures had two-sided mansard roofs, had frontal towers that housed the stairway, and were generally three storeys in height.

By 1933 and the advent of the Commission of Government there were approximately 26 court houses in Newfoundland. All were of wood construction except those at Harbour Grace and St. John's. By 1977 when Environment Canada did a survey of the court houses in Canada, there were only nine court houses remaining in Newfoundland; Greenspond has one of them.

== Historical use ==
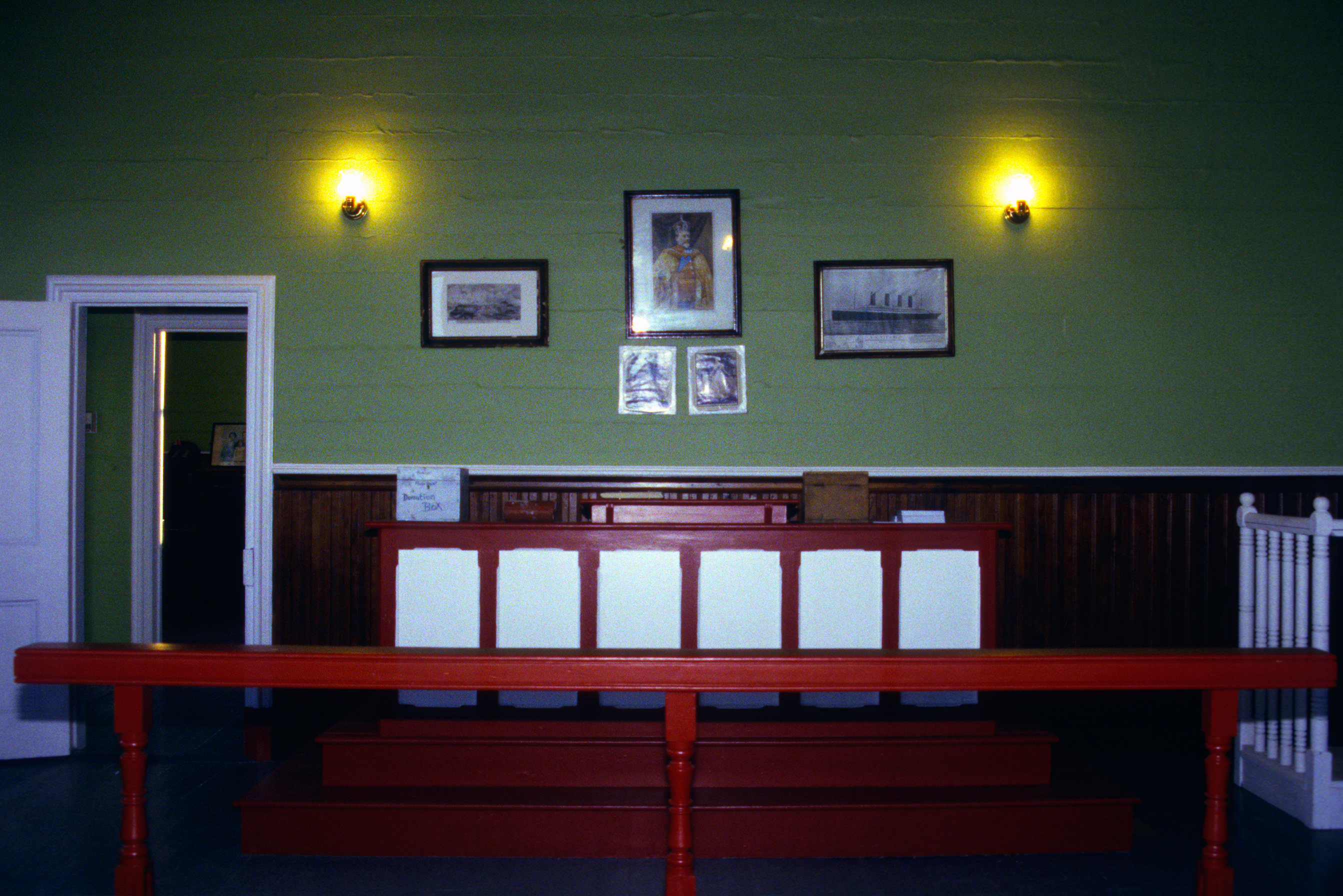
Interior of the Greenspond Courthouse, showing the courtroom with judge's bench and witness stand, taken sometime in the late 1980s or early 1990s.

The first presiding magistrate in the courthouse was Judge Seymour, who had been the local magistrate during the construction of the building. At the time of his departure from Greenspond in 1901, a local delegation noted,

...we cannot allow you to go from our midst without expressing our regret at your departure. We cannot fail to remember that during your administration you have always taken a deep interest in the welfare of the places under your jurisdiction, and that you have always used your influence in promoting local improvement—notably, we may mention the new Court House at Greenspond.

In 1900–1901, the salary for the magistrate was $750. Stipendiary Magistrate R. P. Rice was paid $300; the gaoler, $84.

According to local oral tradition, Greenspond Courthouse also served as a morgue when there were shipwrecks.

== Designation and conservation ==
Greenspond Courthouse was designated a Registered Heritage Structure by the Heritage Foundation of Newfoundland and Labrador, 25 October 1988 and the building received the Southcott Award for restoration by the Newfoundland Historic Trust in 1998. On 8 September 1999, the building was the site of a special sitting of the Supreme Court of Newfoundland, in recognition of the 100th anniversary of the commencement of construction. The structure was listed on the Canadian Register of Historic Places, 23 December 2004. In 2019, the Greenspond Historic Society stated the courthouse had fallen into disrepair and launched a social media campaign to secure restoration funding.

By September 2020, restoration work had begun, including a rebuilding of the centre tower. The tower dome was removed by crane, and refurbished on the ground before being lifted back into place. An adaptive reuse/feasibility study was developed including concepts for a taproom, picnic experience, and accommodations that would require minimal alterations to the historic character of the building.
