= Sunnyside, Newfoundland and Labrador =

Sunnyside
- Town
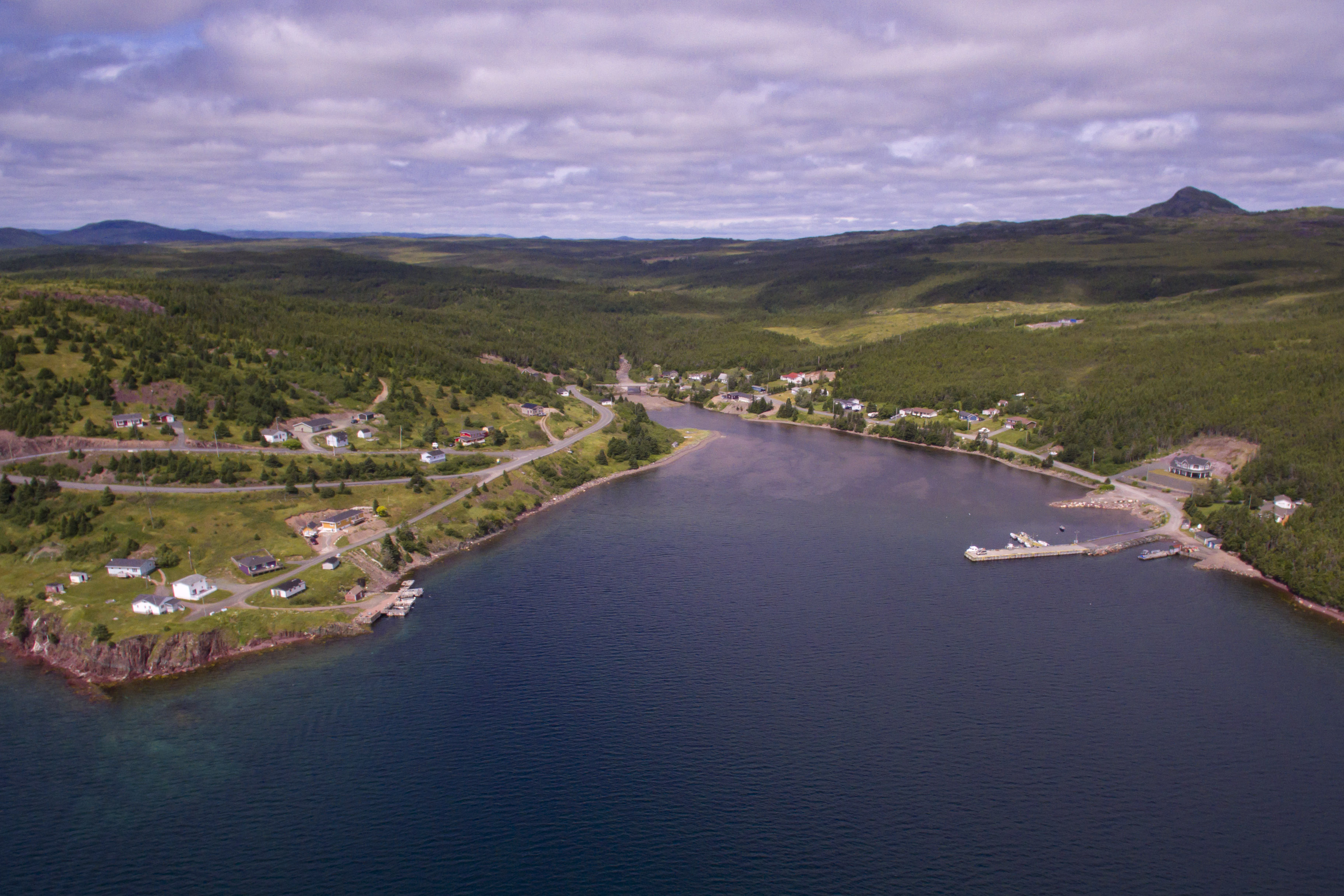

- Location of Sunnyside in Newfoundland
- Coordinates: 47°52′N 53°56′W
- Country: Canada
- Province: Newfoundland and Labrador
- Census division: 1

Area
  - Total: 37.95 km^{2} (14.65 sq mi)

Population (2021)
  - Total: 407
  - Density: 10/km^{2} (26/sq mi)
- Time zone: UTC-3:30 (Newfoundland Time)
  - Summer (DST): UTC-2:30 (Newfoundland Daylight)
- Area code: 709
- Highways: Route 1 (TCH)

Sunnyside is a town on the Avalon Peninsula in Newfoundland and Labrador, Canada. It is in Division 1 on Bull Arm.

== History ==
=== Early history ===
The town of Sunnyside stretches for about five miles along the shore of Trinity Bay, also known as Bull Arm. Sunnyside is believed to have been once inhabited by the native people of Newfoundland known as the Beothuk, discovered by the explorer John Guy. After a few hundred years, the area was settled by the ancestors, of many of the families living there today. Those families were involved in developing the economy of Sunnyside by beginning the fishery, logging, and mining industries in the community. With the creation of those industries, the population has increased over the years resulting in Sunnyside as it is known today.

The USS Niagara landed the first successful Transatlantic Telegraph Cable here in Sunnyside on August 5, 1858. Sunnyside was then Known as "Bay Bulls Arm. During the period in which the cable operated, between Aug 9 and October 20, 1858, 732 messages were sent through the cable station here in Sunnyside. One of the first official messages sent was a congratulatory message from Queen Victoria to US President James Buchanan on the success of the First Transatlantic Cable.

Before the town of Sunnyside was even settled, explorer John Guy, in the year of 1612, "to the north near the present Sunnyside he found a group of natives…" (Rockwood, 1992) According to the Newfoundland and Labrador Heritage website, "The Beothuks are the aboriginal people of the island of Newfoundland. They were Algonkian-speaking hunter-gatherers who probably numbered less than a thousand people at the time of European contact." (Pastore, 1997) Prior to the area being known as Sunnyside, John Guy had named the area Truce Sound in honour of the good relations established with the Beothuk.

As the area was first settled, it was known as Bottom of Bay Bulls Arm. There were other related settlements nearby like Centre Cove. The area was known as Bay Bulls Arm for some time and then changed to Bull Arm. The reason for the change was likely because there is another town known as Bay Bulls. The first permanent settlers to the community were the Snooks from the nearby community of New Perlican. The current name of Sunnyside came from a former school teacher who said "…the spot of sun which seems always to shine on that tiny section of Trinity Bay."(Rockwood, 1992)

=== 19th century to present ===
By the mid 19th century, the community was made up of full fisherman and loggers. During that time, working in the saw-mill was an important job but due to a fire in the community, most of the standing timber was destroyed. The pulpwood drive was also an important form of employment and Morgan Snook was the foreman of the Main River and Badger drive. Fishing was a small part of the economy, but people from other Trinity Bay communities came to Bay Bulls Arm to fish.

"In 1921, the population had reached 337, and the town name had officially been changed to Sunnyside." (Hike Discovery, para. 3) By the 1930s the population in the community had reached its peak of 399 citizens. The population by the 1950s had declined to 228 people. After that time, the population grew steadily over the years until reaching a high population of 726, later decreasing to 634 by 1986.

Over the years many of the citizens of Sunnyside could be found in road construction and other large construction projects. The oil refinery, located in Come By Chance, is a source of employment for many Sunnyside residents. Along with the oil refinery, many of the residents were once employed by working on the Hibernia Oil Platform project, which was located right in their own backyards. "One of the five super modules, the wellhead module, was built at the Bull Arm construction site in Newfoundland. The other four super modules were constructed outside Canada (two in Italy and two in Korea) and shipped to Bull Arm in May and June of 1995 where they were welded together to form one integrated unit." (Hibernia, para. 10)

== Demographics ==
In the 2021 Census of Population conducted by Statistics Canada, Sunnyside had a population of 407 living in 189 of its 271 total private dwellings, a change of 2.8% from its 2016 population of 396. With a land area of 39.02 km^{2} (15.07 sq mi), it had a population density of 10.4/km^{2} (27.0/sq mi) in 2021.

== See also ==
- List of cities and towns in Newfoundland and Labrador
