= St. Pauls, Newfoundland and Labrador =

St. Pauls
- Town
- St. Pauls in 2026
- Interactive map of St. Pauls
- Coordinates: 49°51′15″N 57°48′22″W
- Country: Canada
- Province: Newfoundland and Labrador

Population (2021)
  - Total: 202
- Time zone: UTC-3:30 (Newfoundland Time)
  - Summer (DST): UTC-2:30 (Newfoundland Daylight)
- Area code: 709
- Highways: Route 430

St. Pauls is a town in the Canadian province of Newfoundland and Labrador. The town had a population of 202 in the Canada 2021 Census.

It is known as Uapashku Napaue by the Innu.

== Demographics ==
In the 2021 Census of Population conducted by Statistics Canada, St. Pauls had a population of 202 living in 91 of its 101 total private dwellings, a change of −15.1% from its 2016 population of 238. With a land area of 6.34 km^{2} (2.45 sq mi), it had a population density of 31.9/km^{2} (82.5/sq mi) in 2021.

== See also ==
- List of cities and towns in Newfoundland and Labrador
