= List of historic places in Newfoundland and Labrador =

This is a list of historic places in the province of Newfoundland and Labrador entered on the Canadian Register of Historic Places, whether they are federal, provincial, or municipal. For reasons of length, the list has been divided as follows:

- St. John's
- Avalon Peninsula except St. John's
- Labrador
- Western Newfoundland
- Central Newfoundland
- Bonavista Bay region

== See also ==
- List of National Historic Sites of Canada in Newfoundland and Labrador
