= New Perlican =

Coordinates: 47°54′30″N 53°22′30″W

- Town
- Interactive map of New Perlican
- Country: Canada
- Province: Newfoundland and Labrador

Population (2021)
  - Total: 200
- Time zone: UTC-3:30 (Newfoundland Time)
  - Summer (DST): UTC-2:30 (Newfoundland Daylight)
- Area code: 709
- Highways: Route 80

New Perlican is a town in the Canadian province of Newfoundland and Labrador. The town had a population of 200 in the Canada 2021 Census.

== Geography ==
Black and gray shales of the Precambrian era underlie the town. The main soil is a stony loam podzol of the Turk's Cove series. The vegetation is a complex of coniferous forest (mainly balsam fir) and heath barren.

== History ==
New Perlican is one of the oldest settlements in the province. The town was mentioned by name by Thomas Rowley, one of the first settlers at the Cupids Colony. According to his correspondence, he was making plans to move to New Perlican in 1619. It is unknown if he did.

Archaeologist William (Bill) Gilbert has conducted several seasons of excavations in the community at what is known at the Hefford Plantation (Borden Site Number ClAi-4), which “was first settled by William Hefford and his family in 1675 and appears to have been occupied continually since that time.” This plantation is “thought to be the oldest in Canada that is still inhabited by the descendants of the first settlers.”

By 1677, William Hefford had built a “dwelling house [and] nine store rooms and lodging houses” at New Perlican, and excavations in 2003 uncovered a William III ha’penny minted sometime between 1695 and 1698 and a seventeenth-century padlock. Work the following year recovered a Spanish American silver one real coin manufactured in Potosi in what is now Bolivia, dated to circa 1653.

During King William's War, the village was destroyed in the Avalon Peninsula Campaign.

A burial site (ClAi-12 Bloody Point 2) might date to the 17th or early 18th century. An archaeological survey in 2019 documented two disturbances detected by ground-penetrating radar, which are probably graves. There are also 19 grave markers; one is quite a bit younger than the rest.

The first Anglican church in New Perlican was built in 1834. It was named St. Mark's. St, Mark's had an adjacent graveyard:

Made from local stones, the grave markers were likely either carved in a nearby community to New Perlican. Records showed that there were slate cutters from Wales in Newfoundland dating back centuries, brought over to work the slate that the British were already aware was present on the island. It makes sense that a gravestone carving culture would spring up from that, and I’m not surprised to see these samples at the site! My favourite is the little red stone that reads ‘S W’ in uneven, capital letters. In addition to these, there were several headstones carved by A. Smith, a gravestone carver from St. John’s who was the first to import marble from New England for gravestones in the early 1800s, and MacKim, another carver from St. John’s who also worked with imported marble and limestone.

The church burned and a new church, St. Augustine's, was erected in a different location.

New Perlican circa 1900 was a sheltered harbour with saltbox houses everywhere through the town. Near the water was the Pittman shipbuilding area where many ocean going schooners were built by that prominent family of sea captains in its history.... In the 1920s the landscape changed. New Perlican was littered with many fishing stages, and the shipbuilding area and schooners that were tied up there. In the 1950s there were two churches, St. Matthew’s United Church built in 1913, and the second St. Augustine’s church which was built in 1920.

== Demographics ==
In the 2021 Census of Population conducted by Statistics Canada, New Perlican had a population of 200 living in 107 of its 173 total private dwellings, a change of 7.5% from its 2016 population of 186. With a land area of 24.45 km^{2} (9.44 sq mi), it had a population density of 8.2/km^{2} (21.2/sq mi) in 2021.

== See also ==
- List of cities and towns in Newfoundland and Labrador
